= 2006–07 Újpest FC season =

Újpest
2006–07 season
- Manager: Bertalan Bicskei (until 13 July 2006); Valère Billen (from 14 July 2006 to 22 December 2006); István Urbányi (from 27 December 2006)
- Stadium: Szusza Ferenc Stadion (Home stadium); Budai II. László Stadion (Note: The match against Zalaegerszeg and Pécs were played at the Budai II. László Stadion in Budapest, instead of Újpest regular stadium, the Szusza Ferenc Stadion in Budapest, as the disciplinary committee of the HFF closed the venue due to the disorderly conduct in the May match against MTK.) (Temporary stadium)
- Nemzeti Bajnokság I: 4th
- Magyar Kupa: Quarter-finals
- UEFA Cup: First qualifying round
- Highest home attendance: 4,000 (multiple Nemzeti Bajnokság I matches)
- Lowest home attendance: 1,300 v Pápa (29 November 2006, Magyar Kupa)
- Average home league attendance: 3,045
- Biggest win: 3–0 v Putnok (Away, 19 October 2006, Magyar Kupa); 3–0 v Győr (Away, 10 December 2006, Nemzeti Bajnokság I)
- Biggest defeat: 0–4 v Vaduz (Home, 13 July 2006, UEFA Cup)

The 2006–07 season was Újpest Football Club's 102nd competitive season, 96th consecutive season in the Nemzeti Bajnokság I and 107th year in existence as a football club. In addition to the domestic league, Újpest participated in that season's editions of the Magyar Kupa and the UEFA Cup.

== Squad ==
Squad at end of season

Note: Flags indicate national team as defined under FIFA eligibility rules; some limited exceptions apply. Players may hold more than one non-FIFA nationality.

No.	Pos.	Nation	Player
1	GK	HUN	Szabolcs Balajcza
2	DF	ARG	Ivan Zaleh
4	MF	HUN	Máté Gulyás
5	MF	HUN	György Sándor
6	MF	HUN	András Kőhalmi
7	FW	SRB	Velibor Kopunović
9	MF	HUN	Ronald Habi
10	FW	HUN	Zoltán Kovács
11	MF	HUN	Dániel Völgyi
13	DF	HUN	Márk Mészáros
15	DF	HUN	Zoltán Kiss
16	FW	HUN	Gábor Freud
17	MF	HUN	Károly Erős
18	DF	HUN	Ákos Füzi

No.	Pos.	Nation	Player
19	DF	HUN	Tamás Vaskó
20	DF	SRB	Milan Lukac
21	MF	HUN	Balázs Tóth
22	FW	HUN	Ádám Kisznyér
23	GK	HUN	István Kövesfalvi
24	DF	HUN	Attila Böjte
25	DF	HUN	Krisztián Vermes
26	GK	HUN	Péter Kurucz
28	FW	HUN	Tibor Tisza
30	DF	HUN	Péter Szolnoki
31	MF	HUN	Olivér Nagy
32	MF	HUN	Zsolt Korcsmár
33	FW	HUN	Péter Tóth

== Competitions ==
=== Overview ===
Competition	First match	Last match	Starting round	Final position	Record							
Competition	First match	Last match	Starting round	Final position	Pld	W	D	L	GF	GA	GD	Win %
Nemzeti Bajnokság I	30 July 2006	28 May 2007	Matchday 1	4th	30	15	4	11	39	32	+7	50.00
Magyar Kupa	19 October 2006	3 April 2007	Round of 32	Quarter-finals	5	3	1	1	10	5	+5	60.00
UEFA Cup	13 July 2006	27 July 2006	First qualifying round	First qualifying round	2	1	0	1	1	4	−3	50.00
Total					37	19	5	13	50	41	+9	51.35

Source: Competitions

=== Nemzeti Bajnokság I ===
==== League table ====
Pos	Team	Pld	W	D	L	GF	GA	GD	Pts	Qualification or relegation
2	MTK	30	19	4	7	61	33	+28	61	Qualification for the UEFA Cup first qualifying round
3	Zalaegerszeg	30	17	4	9	54	38	+16	55	Qualification for the Intertoto Cup second round
4	Újpest	30	15	4	11	39	32	+7	46 (Note: Újpest were deducted three points due to federation decision.)	
5	Vasas	30	13	6	11	43	41	+2	45	
6	Fehérvár	30	13	5	12	45	43	+2	44	

Source: soccerway.com

==== Results summary ====
Overall								Home						Away					
Pld	W	D	L	GF	GA	GD	Pts	W	D	L	GF	GA	GD	W	D	L	GF	GA	GD
30	15	4	11	39	32	+7	49	9	2	4	20	13	+7	6	2	7	19	19	0

Source: Hungarian Football Federation

==== Results by round ====
Round	1	2	3	4	5	6	7	8	9	10	11	12	13	14	15	16	17	18	19	20	21	22	23	24	25	26	27	28	29	30
Ground	A	H	A	A	H	A	H	A	H	A	H	A	H	A	H	H	A	H	H	A	H	A	H	A	H	A	H	A	H	A
Result	L	W	D	W	L	W	W	D	W	L	W	W	W	L	L	L	W	W	D	L	W	W	W	W	D	L	W	L	L	L
Position	12	8	6	5	7	5	5	5	4	4	4	3	3	4	4	4	4	4	4	4	4	4	3	3	4	3	4	4	4	4
Points	0	3	4	7	7	10	13	14	17	17	20	23	26	26	26	26	29	32	33	33	36	39	42	45	46	46	46	46	46	46

Source: Matches
A = Away; H = Home; W = Win; D = Draw; L = Loss

==== Matches ====
30 July 2006 1	Diósgyőr	1–0	Újpest	Miskolc
17:30 CEST (UTC+2)	V. Farkas (yellow card) 22', (goal) 58'	Report	Tisza (yellow card) 38'; Hullám (yellow card) 47'; B. Tóth (yellow card) 47'	Stadium: Diósgyőri Stadion; Attendance: 8,000; Referee: Viktor Kassai; Assistant referees: Gábor Erős, István Tóth; Fourth official: Péter Herbály

6 August 2006 2	Újpest	2–0	Győr	Budapest
17:30 CEST (UTC+2)	Vaskó (yellow card) 26'; Völgyi (yellow card) 62'; Z. Kovács I 83'; Cariati 90'	Report	Mátyus (yellow card) 19'; Z. Kovács II (yellow card) 33'; Vincze (yellow card) 51'; Bajzát (yellow card) 78'	Stadium: Szusza Ferenc Stadion; Attendance: 3,331; Referee: Zsolt Szabó; Assistant referees: Róbert Kispál, Dr. Péter Hegyi; Fourth official: Gábor Oláh

19 August 2006 3	Honvéd	1–1	Újpest	Budapest (Note: The match was played at the Béke téri Stadion in Budapest, instead of Honvéd regular stadium, the Bozsik József Stadion in Budapest, due to the renovation work.)
19:00 CEST (UTC+2)	Budovinszky (yellow card) 24'; Pomper (yellow card) 43'; Dobos 53' (pen.); Takács (yellow card) 83'; Dancs (red card) 89'	Report	Erős 17', (yellow card) 51'; Vermes (yellow card) 53'	Stadium: Béke téri Stadion; Attendance: 3,600; Referee: Mihály Fábián; Assistant referees: Tamás Márkus, Róbert Kispál; Fourth official: Tamás Bodac

26 August 2006 4	Rákospalota	1–2	Újpest	Budapest
17:30 CEST (UTC+2)	Makra (yellow card) 51'; G. Nagy I (yellow card) 55' (yellow-red card) 90+1'; Pusztai (yellow card) 86'; Torma 90'	Report	Tisza 23', 28'; Völgyi (yellow card) 32'; Erős (yellow card) 87'	Stadium: Budai II. László Stadion; Attendance: 4,000; Referee: Tamás Arany; Assistant referees: Dr. Péter Kovács, László Viszokai; Fourth official: Miklós Demeter

9 September 2006 5	Újpest	0–1	Zalaegerszeg	Budapest
15:00 CEST (UTC+2)	M. Mészáros (yellow card) 82'	Report	J. Sebők 38', 61'	Stadium: Budai II. László Stadion; Attendance: 4,000; Referee: István Vad; Assistant referees: István Tóth, Zoltán Szalai; Fourth official: Balázs Világi

18 September 2006 6	Sopron	0–2	Újpest	Sopron
18:00 CEST (UTC+2)	Ibric (yellow card) 79'	Report	Rajczi (yellow card) 11'; Tisza 75', 80'	Stadium: Káposztás utcai Stadion; Attendance: 2,000; Referee: Péter Solymosi; Assistant referees: Balázs Huszár, Zoltán Kovács; Fourth official: Krisztián Király

24 September 2006 7	Újpest	1–0	Pécs	Budapest
16:00 CEST (UTC+2)	Tisza (yellow card) 31'; O. Nagy 80'; Hullám (yellow card) 83'	Report	Szekeres (yellow card) 30'; Pest (yellow card) 65'	Stadium: Budai II. László Stadion; Attendance: 4,000; Referee: Viktor Kassai; Assistant referees: Gábor Erős, Tibor Vámos; Fourth official: Gergely Sulyok

30 September 2006 8	Paks	1–1	Újpest	Paks
16:00 CEST (UTC+2)	Tamási (yellow card) 55'; L. Varga 86', (yellow card) 88'; Báló (yellow card) 90+3'	Report	Erős (yellow card) 14'; Rajczi 28'; Hullám (yellow card) 80'	Stadium: Fehérvári úti Stadion; Attendance: 4,500; Referee: Sándor Gergely; Assistant referees: Oszkár Lémon, Zsolt Szalai; Fourth official: Csaba Ursprung

16 October 2006 9	Újpest	2–0	Vasas	Budapest
18:00 CEST (UTC+2)	Rajczi 59'; Z. Kovács I 90+2'	Report	A. Tóth (yellow card) 63'; Kincses (yellow card) 70'; Zo. Fehér (yellow card) 90+1'	Stadium: Szusza Ferenc Stadion; Attendance: 3,000; Referee: István Mészáros; Assistant referees: Róbert Kispál, László Viszokai; Fourth official: Péter Herbály

23 October 2006 10	Kaposvár	1–0	Újpest	Kaposvár
18:00 CEST (UTC+2)	P. Szakály 45'; Grúz (yellow card) 55'; Vasiljević (yellow card) 60'	Report	G. Sándor (yellow card) 43'; Vermes (yellow card) 70'; B. Tóth (yellow card) 81'	Stadium: Rákóczi Stadion; Attendance: 3,000; Referee: Sándor Andó-Szabó; Assistant referees: Zsolt Szpisják, János Medovarszki; Fourth official: Attila Hegedűs

28 October 2006 11	Újpest	1–0	Dunakanyar-Vác	Budapest
18:00 CEST (UTC+2)	Z. Kovács I 33'; Erős (yellow card) 51'; Böjte (yellow card) 63'	Report	Gáspár (yellow card) 14'; P. Kovács (yellow card) 20'; T. Kulcsár (yellow card) 73'; Gábor (yellow card) 89'	Stadium: Szusza Ferenc Stadion; Attendance: 2,500; Referee: Zoltán Iványi; Assistant referees: Attila Kelemen, Gyula Fehér; Fourth official: Attila Hegedűs

6 November 2006 12	Debrecen	0–2	Újpest	Debrecen
18:00 CET (UTC+1)	T. Sándor (yellow card) 7'	Report	Erős (yellow card) 13'; G. Sándor 46'; Rajczi 61', (yellow card) 65'; Korcsmár (yellow card) 70'	Stadium: Oláh Gábor utcai Stadion; Attendance: 8,000; Referee: Mihály Fábián; Assistant referees: Zoltán Tompos, Vencel Tóth II; Fourth official: Péter Herbály

10 November 2006 13	Újpest	2–0	Tatabánya	Budapest
19:00 CET (UTC+1)	Vaskó (yellow card) 55'; Tisza 73'; Kőhalmi 90'	Report	Nečas (yellow card) 27'; Rajnay (yellow card) 41'; G. Gulyás (yellow card) 69'; Ndjodo (red card) 75'	Stadium: Szusza Ferenc Stadion; Attendance: 2,372; Referee: Péter Solmyosi; Assistant referees: Zoltán Szalai, Gábor Takács; Fourth official: Ákos Telek

17 November 2006 14	Fehérvár	3–2	Újpest	Székesfehérvár
19:00 CET (UTC+1)	Kuttor 7'; Julinho 21'; Terjék (yellow card) 26'; Božić (red card) 28'; Dajić 37'; Sitku (yellow card) 90+2'	Report	Rajczi 14'; Erős (yellow card) 40'; Böjte (yellow card) 44'; Vaskó (yellow card) 54'; Tisza 63'	Stadium: Sóstói Stadion; Attendance: 4,500; Referee: Csaba Imre Sápi; Assistant referees: Ferenc Székely, Dr. Péter Kovács; Fourth official: Norbert Ferencz

24 November 2006 15	Újpest	2–3	MTK	Budapest
19:00 CET (UTC+1)	Tisza 23', 73'; M. Gulyás (yellow card) 80'	Report	K. Németh 33'; Hrepka 41', 63', (yellow card) 50'; Bori (yellow card) 69'	Stadium: Szusza Ferenc Stadion; Attendance: 2,500; Referee: Viktor Kassai; Assistant referees: Gábor Erős, Tibor Vámos; Fourth official: Károly Török

4 December 2006 16	Újpest	0–3	Diósgyőr	Budapest
18:00 CET (UTC+1)	Erős (yellow card) 41'; Völgyi (yellow card) 85'	Report	Kéthévoama 5'; A. Simon 43'; Halgas 66', (yellow card) 66'; Szögedi (yellow card) 81'; Mogyorósi (yellow card) 83'	Stadium: Szusza Ferenc Stadion; Attendance: 3,000; Referee: Tamás Bognár; Assistant referees: Dr. Péter Szabó, Dr. Péter Kovács; Fourth official: Gábor Oláh

10 December 2006 17	Győr	0–3	Újpest	Győr (Note: The match was played at the Nádorvárosi Stadion in Győr, instead of Győr regular stadium, the Stadion ETO in Győr, which was demolished to make way to the newly built ETO Park.)
13:30 CET (UTC+1)	Zs. Kiss (yellow card) 43'; Hanák (yellow card) 52'; Regedei (yellow card) 54' (yellow-red card) 70'; Jäkl (yellow card) 73'	Report	Z. Kovács I 7'; Korcsmár 9', (yellow card) 40'; Mészáros 89'	Stadium: Nádorvárosi Stadion; Attendance: 1,000; Referee: István Vad; Assistant referees: Ferenc Székely, Balázs Huszár; Fourth official: Gergő Király

26 February 2007 18	Újpest	4–2	Honvéd	Budapest
18:00 CET (UTC+1)	Zaleh 8', (yellow card) 10'; Erős (yellow card) 15'; Tisza 47'; Vermes (yellow card) 66', (goal) 72'; Z. Kovács I 70'	Report	Smiljanić (yellow card) 23', (goal) 90+1'; Pomper (yellow card) 27'; Angoua (yellow card) 29'; Ndjodo 69'	Stadium: Szusza Ferenc Stadion; Attendance: 3,222; Referee: Zoltán Iványi; Assistant referees: Dr. Péter Hegyi, János Medovarszki; Fourth official: Gábor Oláh

3 March 2007 19	Újpest	0–0	Rákospalota	Budapest
16:00 CET (UTC+1)		Report	Török (yellow card) 5'; Makra (yellow card) 44'; Nyerges (yellow card) 62'	Stadium: Szusza Ferenc Stadion; Attendance: 3,502; Referee: Tamás Arany; Assistant referees: Balázs Farkas, István Tóth; Fourth official: József Erdős

12 March 2007 20	Zalaegerszeg	2–0	Újpest	Zalaegerszeg
18:00 CET (UTC+1)	Francišković 48'; Waltner 79'; Dovičovič (yellow card) 82'	Report	B. Tóth (yellow card) 12'	Stadium: ZTE Arena; Attendance: 6,500; Referee: Péter Solymosi; Assistant referees: Zoltán Szalai, Tibor Vámos; Fourth official: Krisztián Király

17 March 2007 21	Újpest	1–0	Sopron	Budapest
16:00 CET (UTC+1)	Tisza 28' (pen.)	Report	Dragomir (yellow card) 22'; A. Horváth I (red card) 28'; Radu (yellow card) 29'; Cigan (yellow card) 48'; Dancs (yellow card) 90+1'	Stadium: Szusza Ferenc Stadion; Attendance: 3,000; Referee: István Vad; Assistant referees: Vencel Tóth II, Gyula Ortó; Fourth official: Róbert Nagy

31 March 2007 22	Pécs	0–1	Újpest	Pécs
15:00 CEST (UTC+2)	Lantos (yellow card) 60'	Report	Kisznyér (yellow card) 18'; Vaskó (yellow card) 52', (goal) 71'	Stadium: Stadion PMFC; Attendance: 3,000; Referee: Tamás Arany; Assistant referees: Gábor Takács, Oszkár Lémon; Fourth official: Gábor Péter Kovács

9 April 2007 23	Újpest	3–2	Paks	Budapest
18:00 CEST (UTC+2)	Vaskó 39', 61'; Vermes (yellow card) 70'; Tisza 80'	Report	Heffler 46' (pen.), 90+1' (pen.), (yellow card) 47'; Tamási (yellow card) 53'	Stadium: Szusza Ferenc Stadion; Attendance: 3,000; Referee: Sándor Andó-Szabó; Assistant referees: Imre Attila Nagy, Zsolt Butkai; Fourth official: Attila Tóth

13 April 2007 24	Vasas	1–2	Újpest	Budapest
19:00 CEST (UTC+2)	Kincses 54'	Report	G. Sándor 36'; Z. Kovács I 37'	Stadium: Illovszky Rudolf Stadion; Attendance: 5,000; Referee: Zoltán Iványi; Assistant referees: Zsolt Szpisják, István Albert; Fourth official: Attila Hegedűs

21 April 2007 25	Újpest	0–0	Kaposvár	Budapest
18:00 CEST (UTC+2)	Erős (yellow card) 77'	Report	Maróti (yellow card) 54'; Petrók (yellow card) 86'; Zahorecz (yellow card) 86'	Stadium: Szusza Ferenc Stadion; Attendance: 2,500; Referee: Tamás Bognár; Assistant referees: Dr. Péter Szabó, Balázs Huszár; Fourth official: Csaba Pintér

27 April 2007 26	Dunakanyar-Vác	3–1	Újpest	Vác
19:00 CEST (UTC+2)	Vén 23', 61'; Bozori (yellow card) 44'; Dudás (yellow card) 47'; Rusvay (yellow card) 53'; Palásthy 90+2'	Report	G. Sándor (yellow card) 6'; Völgyi (yellow card) 9'; Böjte (red card) 23'; Tisza 41'; Balajcza (yellow card) 44'; Vaskó (yellow card) 60'	Stadium: Ligeti Stadion; Attendance: 2,000; Referee: István Vad; Assistant referees: Attila Kelemen, István Tóth; Fourth official: Gergő Király

4 May 2007 27	Újpest	2–0	Debrecen	Budapest
19:00 CEST (UTC+2)	G. Sándor 1', (yellow card) 55'; Vaskó (yellow card) 48'; Z. Kovács I 53', (yellow card) 53'; Habi (yellow card) 62'; Füzi (yellow card) 88'	Report	Komlósi (yellow card) 14' (yellow-red card) 73'; Sidibe (yellow card) 29'; Z. Kiss (yellow card) 72'; Bernáth (yellow card) 79'	Stadium: Szusza Ferenc Stadion; Attendance: 3,421; Referee: Mihály Fábián; Assistant referees: Dr. Zsolt Varga, Zoltán Pápai; Fourth official: Róbert Nagy

12 May 2007 28	Tatabánya	3–2	Újpest	Tatabánya
15:00 CEST (UTC+2)	Filó 50'; Megyesi 72'; Kouemaha 90+3'	Report	Tisza 26'; Z. Kovács I (yellow card) 26', (goal) 87'; Erős (red card) 90+3'	Stadium: Városi Stadion; Attendance: 3,000; Referee: Zoltán Iványi; Assistant referees: Balázs Farkas, Dr. Ádám Vári; Fourth official: Attila Tóth

21 May 2007 29	Újpest	0–2	Fehérvár	Budapest
18:00 CEST (UTC+2)	Zaleh (yellow card) 67'	Report	Dajić 45'; Julinho 50'; Zs. Fehér (yellow card) 70'; G. Horváth II (yellow card) 75'	Stadium: Szusza Ferenc Stadion; Attendance: 2,323; Referee: Viktor Kassai; Assistant referees: Gábor Erős, Zsolt Szpisják; Fourth official: József Erdős

28 May 2007 30	MTK	2–0	Újpest	Budapest
18:00 CEST (UTC+2)	L. Horváth 5', (yellow card) 90+1' (yellow-red card) 90+3'; Kanta 65'	Report	Erős (yellow card) 90+1' (yellow-red card) 90+3'	Stadium: Hidegkuti Nándor Stadion; Attendance: 1,500; Referee: István Mészáros; Assistant referees: Zoltán Szalai, Tibor Vígh; Fourth official: Gábor Oláh

=== Magyar Kupa ===
19 October 2006 Round of 32	Putnok	0–3	Újpest	Putnok
13:30 CEST (UTC+2)	Füleki (yellow card) 40'	Report	Z. Kovács I 2x; Vaskó; Erős (yellow card) 51' (yellow-red card) 57'; Korcsmár (yellow card) 89'	Stadium: Állomás úti Sportpálya; Attendance: 1,000; Referee: Zsolt Szabó; Assistant referees: R. Kispál, Z. Tompos

==== Round of 16 ====
21 November 2006 First leg	Pápa	0–2	Újpest	Pápa
16:30 CET (UTC+1)	Lászka (yellow card) 26'; Manoel (yellow card) 45'; Z. Szabó (yellow card) 88'	Report	B. Tóth 12'; Vaskó (yellow card) 17'; O. Nagy 45'	Stadium: Perutz Stadion; Attendance: 1,500; Referee: István Vad; Assistant referees: Butka, Huszár

29 November 2006 Second leg	Újpest	4–2 (6–2 agg.)	Pápa	Budapest
18:00 CET (UTC+1)	Z. Kovács I 20' (pen.); Korcsmár (yellow card) 26'; G. Sándor (yellow card) 35'; Tisza 41', 55' (pen.); Cariati 88'	Report	Honma 12'; A. Farkas 27' (pen.); D. Varga (yellow card) 55'	Stadium: Szusza Ferenc Stadion; Attendance: 1,300; Referee: Sándor Gergely; Assistant referees: L. Varga II, I. Szécsényi
Note: Újpest won 6–2 on aggregate.

==== Quarter-finals ====
21 March 2007 Second leg	Újpest	0–0	Debrecen	Budapest
18:00 CET (UTC+1)		Report		Stadium: Szusza Ferenc Stadion; Attendance: 2,500; Referee: Sándor Gergely; Assistant referees: Balázs Farkas, Szabolcs Deutsch

3 April 2007 First leg	Debrecen	3–1 (3–1 agg.)	Újpest	Debrecen
18:00 CEST (UTC+2)	Z. Kiss 13'; Bernáth (yellow card) 15'; Zsolnai 67'; Dzsudzsák 81'; Komlósi (yellow card) 83'; Vukmir (yellow card) 90+2'	Report	Zaleh (yellow card) 21' (yellow-red card) 59'; Tisza 36'; Vaskó (yellow card) 45'; Erős (yellow card) 90'	Stadium: Oláh Gábor utcai Stadion; Attendance: 8,000; Referee: Zsolt Szabó; Assistant referees: Róbert Kispál, Zoltán Tompos
Note: Debrecen won 3–1 on aggregate.

=== UEFA Cup ===
==== Qualifying rounds ====
===== First qualifying round =====
13 July 2006 First leg	Újpest (Hungary)	0–4	(Liechtenstein) Vaduz	Budapest, Hungary
19:00 CEST (UTC+2)	Vanczák (yellow card) 44'; Vituska (yellow card) 90'	Report	Faye 14', 63'; Akdemir 31'; Hasler (yellow card) 34'; Maggetti (yellow card) 55'; Sara 90'	Stadium: Szusza Ferenc Stadion; Attendance: 3,763; Referee: Svein Oddvar Moen (Norway); Assistant referees: Erik Ræstad (Norway), Øystein Havig (Norway); Fourth official: Svein-Erik Edvartsen (Norway)

27 July 2006 Second leg	Vaduz (Liechtenstein)	0–1 (4–1 agg.)	(Hungary) Újpest	Vaduz, Liechtenstein
19:30 CEST (UTC+2)	Wieczorek (yellow card) 35'; Alastra (yellow card) 60'; Wüthrich (yellow card) 76'; Sara (yellow card) (yellow-red card) 86'	Report	N. Tóth (yellow card) 52', (goal) 55'; Erős (yellow card) (yellow-red card) 70'; Vituska (yellow card) 87'	Stadium: Rheinpark Stadion; Attendance: 1,150; Referee: Cüneyt Çakır (Turkey); Assistant referees: Bülent Gökcü (Turkey), Bahattin Duran (Turkey); Fourth official: Cem Deda (Turkey)
Note: Vaduz won 4–1 on aggregate.
