= 2007–08 Újpest FC season =

Újpest
2007–08 season
- Manager: István Urbányi (until 21 April 2008); Lázár Szentes (from 21 April 2008)
- Stadium: Szusza Ferenc Stadion
- Nemzeti Bajnokság I: 4th
- Magyar Kupa: Third round
- Ligakupa: Autumn season: Quarter-finals; Spring season: Quarter-finals
- Highest home attendance: 6,245 v Debrecen (23 November 2007, Nemzeti Bajnokság I)
- Lowest home attendance: 500 v Fehérvár (2 October 2007, Ligakupa)
- Average home league attendance: 4,026
- Biggest win: 7–0 v Vasas (Away, 8 December 2007, Ligakupa)
- Biggest defeat: 0–5 v Debrecen (Away, 12 March 2008, Ligakupa)

The 2007–08 season was Újpest Football Club's 103rd competitive season, 97th consecutive season in the Nemzeti Bajnokság I and 108th season in existence as a football club. In addition to the domestic league, Újpest participated in that season's editions of the Magyar Kupa and the Ligakupa.

== Squad ==
Squad at end of season

Note: Flags indicate national team as defined under FIFA eligibility rules; some limited exceptions apply. Players may hold more than one non-FIFA nationality.

No.	Pos.	Nation	Player
1	GK	HUN	Szabolcs Balajcza
2	DF	SRB	Ivan Dudić
3	DF	CMR	Haman Sadjo
5	MF	BIH	Mario Božić
6	MF	HUN	Attila Hullám
7	FW	BIH	Sasa Radulovic
8	MF	HUN	Norbert Hajdú
9	MF	CRO	Ronald Habi
10	FW	HUN	Zoltán Kovács
11	FW	CMR	Dennis Dourandi
14	FW	ROU	Tibor Moldovan
15	DF	HUN	Tamás Juhár
16	DF	HUN	Csaba Regedei

No.	Pos.	Nation	Player
17	MF	HUN	István Vituska
18	MF	HUN	Tamás Györök
19	MF	CMR	Christian Bodiong Ebala
20	MF	CAF	Foxi Kéthévoama
21	MF	HUN	Zsolt Korcsmár
22	FW	HUN	Marcell Takács
23	GK	HUN	András Dombai
24	DF	HUN	Attila Böjte
25	DF	HUN	Krisztián Vermes
26	GK	HUN	Pál Szalma
28	FW	HUN	Tibor Tisza
30	DF	HUN	Péter Szolnoki
31	DF	HUN	Gábor Dvorschák

== Competitions ==
=== Overview ===
Competition	First match	Last match	Starting round	Final position	Record							
Competition	First match	Last match	Starting round	Final position	Pld	W	D	L	GF	GA	GD	Win %
Nemzeti Bajnokság I	21 July 2007	31 May 2008	Matchday 1	4th	30	16	7	7	58	40	+18	53.33
Magyar Kupa	29 August 2007	29 August 2007	Third round	Third round	1	0	0	1	1	3	−2	0.00
Ligakupa (Autumn season)	15 August 2007	28 October 2007	Group stage	Quarter-finals	8	3	2	3	15	17	−2	37.50
Ligakupa (Spring season)	1 December 2007	12 March 2008	Group stage	Quarter-finals	8	3	0	5	15	19	−4	37.50
Total					47	22	9	16	89	79	+10	46.81

Source: Competitions

=== Nemzeti Bajnokság I ===
==== League table ====
Pos	Team	Pld	W	D	L	GF	GA	GD	Pts	Qualification or relegation
2	Debrecen	30	19	7	4	67	29	+38	64	Qualification for UEFA Cup first qualifying round
3	Győr	30	16	10	4	64	35	+29	58	Qualification for UEFA Cup first qualifying round
4	Újpest	30	16	7	7	58	40	+18	55	
5	Fehérvár	30	17	3	10	48	32	+16	54	
6	Kaposvár	30	14	9	7	48	38	+10	51	

Source: soccerway.com

==== Results summary ====
Overall								Home						Away					
Pld	W	D	L	GF	GA	GD	Pts	W	D	L	GF	GA	GD	W	D	L	GF	GA	GD
30	16	7	7	58	40	+18	55	7	5	3	27	18	+9	9	2	4	31	22	+9

Source: Hungarian Football Federation

==== Matches ====
21 July 2007 1	Siófok	2–4	Újpest	Siófok
19:00 CEST (UTC+2)	Tusori 3'; Gajda (yellow card) 13'; Homonyik 21', (yellow card) 43'; Kuttor (yellow card) 77'; László (yellow card) 77'	Report	Vaskó (yellow card) 43'; Kéthévoama 51'; O. Nagy 77'; Rajczi 79', 90+6'; Sadjo (yellow card) 90'; Habi (yellow card) 90+4'	Stadium: Révész Géza utcai Stadion; Attendance: 10,000; Referee: Zsolt Szabó; Assistant referees: Róbert Kispál, Zoltán Kovács; Fourth official: Csaba Pintér

27 July 2007 2	Újpest	1–1	Zalaegerszeg	Budapest
19:00 CEST (UTC+2)	Kéthévoama 61'; Pető (yellow card) 81'	Report	N. Tóth 45'; Vulin (yellow card) 56'; Miljatovič (yellow card) 80'; Davidov (yellow card) 82'; P. Máté I (yellow card) 89'	Stadium: Szusza Ferenc Stadion; Attendance: 4,223; Referee: Péter Solymosi; Assistant referees: Oszkár Lémon, István Tóth; Fourth official: Péter Pető

6 August 2007 3	MTK	0–0	Újpest	Budapest
18:00 CEST (UTC+2)	Lambulić (yellow card) 65'	Report	Pető (yellow card) 27'; Rajczi (yellow card) 74'; Habi (yellow card) 79'	Stadium: Hidegkuti Nándor Stadion; Attendance: 5,500; Referee: Viktor Kassai; Assistant referees: Gábor Erős, Zsolt Szpisják; Fourth official: Attila Hegedűs

13 August 2007 4	Újpest	0–2	Kaposvár	Budapest
18:00 CEST (UTC+2)	Z. Kovács I (yellow card) 51'; Radulovic (yellow card) 62'	Report	Petrók (yellow card) 31'; Oláh 56'; Vasiljević 70'; Maróti (yellow card) 90'	Stadium: Szusza Ferenc Stadion; Attendance: 3,725; Referee: Szabolcs Szilasi; Assistant referees: Imre Attila Nagy, György Ring; Fourth official: Gergő Király

19 August 2007 5	Honvéd	1–4	Újpest	Budapest
19:00 CEST (UTC+2)	Bárányos 45', (yellow card) 76'; Smiljanić (red card) 45'; Mogyorósi (red card) 61'; Angoua (yellow card) 82'	Report	Kéthévoama (yellow card) 14', (goal) 71'; Böjte (yellow card) 33'; Sadjo (yellow card) 39', (goal) 80'; Korcsmár 41'; Rajczi (red card) 45'; G. Sándor (yellow card) 53', (goal) 54'	Stadium: Bozsik József Stadion; Attendance: 4,700; Referee: Mihály Fábián; Assistant referees: Zoltán Szalai, István Tóth; Fourth official: László Csorba

27 August 2007 6	Újpest	1–1	Vasas	Budapest
18:00 CEST (UTC+2)	Z. Kovács I 62'	Report	Tóth B. (yellow card) 58'; Tandari 66'	Stadium: Szusza Ferenc Stadion; Attendance: 3,596; Referee: Tamás Arany; Assistant referees: Tibor Vámos, Dr. Zsolt Varga; Fourth official: Róbert Nagy

1 September 2007 7	Nyíregyháza	1–2	Újpest	Nyíregyháza
16:00 CEST (UTC+2)	Minczér (yellow card) 20'; Zaleh 51', (yellow card) 51'; Ambrusz (yellow card) 58'	Report	Habi (yellow card) 25'; Radulovic 35'; Roiha 80', (yellow card) 81'; Böjte (yellow card) 81'	Stadium: Városi Stadion; Attendance: 6,000; Referee: István Mészáros; Assistant referees: Zsolt Szpisják, János Medovarszki; Fourth official: Attila Hegedűs

15 September 2007 8	Újpest	3–0	Tatabánya	Budapest
15:00 CEST (UTC+2)	Tisza 3'; Korcsmár (yellow card) 24'; Sadjo (yellow card) 36'; Z. Kovács I 40'; Dourandi 83'	Report	Filó (yellow card) 16'; A. Németh (yellow card) 65'	Stadium: Szusza Ferenc Stadion; Attendance: 3,100; Referee: Krisztián Pánczél; Assistant referees: László Viszokai, Gyula Fehér; Fourth official: J. Zoltán Kovács

22 September 2007 9	Rákospalota	1–1	Újpest	Budapest
16:00 CEST (UTC+2)	Polonkai 34'; Cseri (yellow card) 57'	Report	Do-kweon 65'	Stadium: Budai II. László Stadion; Attendance: 2,800; Referee: Tamás Arany; Assistant referees: Dr. Péter Kovács, István Kovács; Fourth official: László Varga

29 September 2007 10	Újpest	4–0	Sopron	Budapest
15:00 CEST (UTC+2)	Tisza 4', 22'; Dourandi 9'; Kéthévoama 42'	Report	Aquino (yellow card) 14'; Sira (yellow card) 16'; Z. Pintér (yellow card) 73'	Stadium: Szusza Ferenc Stadion; Attendance: 2,500; Referee: Viktor Kassai; Assistant referees: Gábor Erős, Attila Kelemen; Fourth official: Gábor Péter Kovács

5 October 2007 11	Fehérvár	1–2	Újpest	Székesfehérvár
19:00 CEST (UTC+2)	Csobánki (yellow card) 32'; Dajić 37', (yellow card) 90+2'	Report	Kéthévoama (yellow card) 4'; Sadjo (yellow card) 46'; Z. Kovács I 74'; Tisza 85'	Stadium: Sóstói Stadion; Attendance: 1,921; Referee: Péter Solymosi; Assistant referees: Zsolt Szpisják, Gábor Takács; Fourth official: Attila Hegedűs

20 October 2007 12	Újpest	3–1	Paks	Budapest
18:00 CEST (UTC+2)	Dourandi 9'; Z. Kovács I 29'; Vermes (yellow card) 36'; G. Sándor 55'	Report	Éger (yellow card) 56'; T. Kiss I 80'	Stadium: Szusza Ferenc Stadion; Attendance: 3,307; Referee: Zoltán Iványi; Assistant referees: István Albert, János Medovarszki; Fourth official: Tibor Gyarmati II

3 November 2007 13	Győr	4–2	Újpest	Győr
13:00 CET (UTC+1)	Völgyi 8', (yellow card) 36'; Nikolov (red card) 43'; Bajzát 49', 67'; Z. Kovács II (yellow card) 63'; Tokody 90'	Report	Sadjo (yellow card) 33'; G. Sándor 37'; Radulovic (yellow card) 47'; Z. Kovács I 53'	Stadium: ETO Park; Attendance: 3,500; Referee: Tamás Arany; Assistant referees: László Viszokai, István Szécsényi; Fourth official: Dániel Becséri

9 November 2007 14	Diósgyőr	1–4	Újpest	Miskolc
19:00 CET (UTC+1)	Bessong 22'; Elek (yellow card) 38'; Kállai (yellow card) 51'; Köteles (yellow card) 56'	Report	Z. Kovács I 11'; Sadjo (yellow card) 25', (goal) 57' (pen.); Tisza (yellow card) 28', (goal) 53' (pen.); Kéthévoama (yellow card) 38', (goal) 73' (pen.); Habi (yellow card) 50'	Stadium: Diósgyőri Stadion; Attendance: 4,000; Referee: Péter Solymosi; Assistant referees: Dr. Péter Hegyi, Zsolt Butkai; Fourth official: Gábor Fajkusz

23 November 2007 15	Újpest	1–1	Debrecen	Budapest
19:00 CET (UTC+1)	Pető (yellow card) 36'; Z. Kiss II (yellow card) 45'; Korcsmár 90'; Tisza (yellow card) 90+1'	Report	Leandro 51'; Rudolf (yellow card) 70'	Stadium: Szusza Ferenc Stadion; Attendance: 6,245; Referee: Viktor Kassai; Assistant referees: Gábor Erős, Tibor Vámos; Fourth official: Ádám Németh

23 February 2008 16	Újpest	3–0	Siófok	Budapest
15:00 CET (UTC+1)	Dourandi 13', 55'; Moldovan 84'	Report	Sütő (red card) 81'	Stadium: Szusza Ferenc Stadion; Attendance: 4,595; Referee: Mihály Fábián; Assistant referees: Gyula Fehér, Attila Kelemen; Fourth official: Róbert Nagy

29 February 2008 17	Zalaegerszeg	4–1	Újpest	Zalaegerszeg
19:00 CET (UTC+1)	Zatara 15', 58'; Waltner 19'; Méyé 44'; Vulin (yellow card) 76'; B. Molnár (yellow card) 81'	Report	Sadjo (yellow card) 5'; Tisza 55'; Dourandi (yellow card) 81'	Stadium: ZTE Arena; Attendance: 7,500; Referee: Tamás Arany; Assistant referees: Zoltán Kovács, Zsolt Butkai; Fourth official: Csaba Pintér

8 March 2008 18	Újpest	1–3	MTK	Budapest
15:00 CET (UTC+1)	Božić (yellow card) 9'; Ebala 51'; Balajcza (yellow card) 66'; Regedei (yellow card) 67'	Report	Hrepka (yellow card) 11'; L. Horváth (yellow card) 21'; Lambulić 29'; J. Kanta 68', 71'	Stadium: Szusza Ferenc Stadion; Attendance: 4,500; Referee: Zsolt Szabó; Assistant referees: Róbert Kispál, Zoltán Szalai; Fourth official: Gergely Szőts

14 March 2008 19	Kaposvár	0–3	Újpest	Kaposvár
19:00 CET (UTC+1)	A. Pintér (yellow card) 68'; Pest (yellow card) 70'; Graszl (yellow card) 71'; Grúz (yellow card) 83'	Report	Tisza 47', 90+3'; Z. Kovács I (yellow card) 66'; Božić (yellow card) 70'; Hajdú 83'	Stadium: Rákóczi Stadion; Attendance: 3,500; Referee: István Mészáros; Assistant referees: László Viszokai, Szabolcs Deutsch; Fourth official: Norbert Kiss

21 March 2008 20	Újpest	1–0	Honvéd	Budapest
19:00 CET (UTC+1)	Božić (yellow card) 55'; Habi (yellow card) 84'; Tisza 90+2' (pen.)	Report	Angoua (yellow card) 17'; Á. Takács (yellow card) 46'; Dobos (yellow card) 57'; Smiljanić (yellow card) 70'; Bárányos (yellow card) 90+2'	Stadium: Szusza Ferenc Stadion; Attendance: 4,388; Referee: Péter Solymosi; Assistant referees: Gábor Takács, Zsolt Márton; Fourth official: J. Zoltán Kovács

31 March 2008 21	Vasas	0–1	Újpest	Budapest
18:00 CEST (UTC+2)	Piller (yellow card) 22'; Ne. Nikolić (yellow card) 40'; Pavičević (yellow card) 57'	Report	Tisza 66', (yellow card) 81'	Stadium: Illovszky Rudolf Stadion; Attendance: 4,000; Referee: Mihály Fábián; Assistant referees: Dr. Zsolt Varga, Zoltán Pápai; Fourth official: Róbert Nagy

7 April 2008 22	Újpest	1–0	Nyíregyháza	Budapest
18:00 CEST (UTC+2)	Sadjo (yellow card) 40'; Božić (yellow card) 43'; Dourandi 83'; Radulovic (yellow card) 85'	Report	Ramos (yellow card) 11'; Dosso (yellow card) 15'; T. Hegedűs (yellow card) 87'	Stadium: Szusza Ferenc Stadion; Attendance: 3,153; Referee: Zoltán Iványi; Assistant referees: János Medovarszki, Dr. Ádám Vári; Fourth official: Gábor Oláh

12 April 2008 23	Tatabánya	2–3	Újpest	Budapest (Note: The match was played at the Illovszky Rudolf Stadion in Budapest, instead of Tatabánya regular stadium, the Városi Stadion in Tatabánya, which did not meet HFF requirements.)
19:00 CEST (UTC+2)	V. Farkas (yellow card) 39'; Vámosi 58', (yellow card) 68'; I. Kovács (yellow card) 71'; Megyesi 84'	Report	Tisza 22', 73'; Habi (yellow card) 45'; Korcsmár 60'; Hajdú (yellow card) 68'	Stadium: Illovszky Rudolf Stadion; Attendance: 4,000; Referee: István Vad; Assistant referees: Gyula Ortó, János Demeter; Fourth official: Róbert Nagy

19 April 2008 24	Újpest	4–4	Rákospalota	Budapest
20:00 CEST (UTC+2)	Somorjai 6' (o.g.); Tisza 28' (pen.), 31' (pen.); Sadjo (yellow card) 62'; Kéthévoama 90+3'	Report	Nyerges 7', 78'; G. Horváth I 21'; Szántai (yellow card) 31'; Z. Varga 54'; Kapcsos (yellow card) 55'; Rása (yellow card) 82'	Stadium: Szusza Ferenc Stadion; Attendance: 4,541; Referee: Sándor Andó-Szabó; Assistant referees: Lajos L. Tóth, Zsolt Márton; Fourth official: János Takács

26 April 2008 25	Sopron	0–3 (awd.)	Újpest	Sopron
		Report		Stadium: Káposztás utcai Stadion
Note: After the exclusion of Sopron, the matches were registered with a goal difference of 3–0.

2 May 2008 26	Újpest	1–0	Fehérvár	Budapest
19:00 CEST (UTC+2)	Dourandi (yellow card) 35'; Božić (yellow card) 38'; G. Sándor 83'	Report	B. Farkas (yellow card) 34'	Stadium: Szusza Ferenc Stadion; Attendance: 5,108; Referee: Péter Solymosi; Assistant referees: Gábor Takács, István Tóth; Fourth official: Gábor Oláh

12 May 2008 27	Paks	2–0	Újpest	Paks
18:00 CEST (UTC+2)	Kriston (yellow card) 24'; Tököli 44'; Heffler 60'; Zováth (yellow card) 70'	Report		Stadium: Fehérvári úti Stadion; Attendance: 5,000; Referee: István Mészáros; Assistant referees: Vencel Tóth II, László Viszokai; Fourth official: Tibor Gyarmati II

16 May 2008 28	Újpest	1–3	Győr	Budapest
19:00 CEST (UTC+2)	Tisza 25'	Report	Bajzát 36', 67'; Juhár 52' (o.g.)	Stadium: Szusza Ferenc Stadion; Attendance: 4,118; Referee: Tamás Arany; Assistant referees: Gábor Takács, Zoltán Szalai; Fourth official: Gábor Péter Kovács

25 May 2008 29	Újpest	2–2	Diósgyőr	Budapest
18:00 CEST (UTC+2)	Kéthévoama 53'; G. Sándor 55'; Habi (yellow card) 84'	Report	Honma 27'; Virág 29', (yellow card) 29'	Stadium: Szusza Ferenc Stadion; Attendance: 3,291; Referee: István Vad; Assistant referees: Tibor Vámos, Zsolt Butkai; Fourth official: Gergő Janitz

31 May 2008 30	Debrecen	3–1	Újpest	Debrecen
15:00 CEST (UTC+2)	Bogdanović 7', 86'; Kerekes 39'	Report	Habi (red card) 56'; Regedei 85'	Stadium: Oláh Gábor utcai Stadion; Attendance: 7,500; Referee: Tamás Arany; Assistant referees: György Ring, Zsolt Márton; Fourth official: Gergely Szőts

=== Magyar Kupa ===
29 August 2007 Third round	Felcsút	3–1	Újpest	Felcsút
19:00 CEST (UTC+2)	Schrancz 12' (pen.), 67' (pen.); Venczel (yellow card) 31'; Móri 76'	Report	Tisza 28', (yellow card) 49'; Böjte (yellow card) 60'; Balajcza (yellow card) 66'; Radulovic (yellow card) 77'	Stadium: Felcsút Sporttelep; Attendance: 1,000; Referee: Csaba Imre Sápi; Assistant referees: Péter Berettyán, Zsolt Márton

=== Ligakupa ===
==== Autumn season ====
===== Group stage =====
Pos	Team	Pld	W	D	L	GF	GA	GD	Pts	Qualification	FEH	UJP	HON	PAK
1	Fehérvár	6	3	1	2	15	9	+6	10	Advance to knockout phase	—	3–0	2–2	3–1
2	Újpest	6	3	1	2	15	14	+1	10	Advance to knockout phase	4–3	—	4–5	4–1
3	Honvéd	6	2	2	2	12	16	−4	8		0–3	1–1	—	4–2
4	Paks	6	2	0	4	11	14	−3	6		2–1	1–2	4–0	—

Source: HFF

15 August 2007 1	Fehérvár	3–0	Újpest	Székesfehérvár
19:00 CEST (UTC+2)	G. Horváth II 7'; Csobánki (yellow card) 53'; D. Nagy (yellow card) 56'; Vayer 66'; Dvéri (yellow card) 77', (goal) 87'	Report	Tolnai (yellow card) 89'	Stadium: Sóstói Stadion; Attendance: 1,000; Referee: Zsolt Szabó; Assistant referees: Róbert Kispál, Zsolt Butkai

22 August 2007 2	Újpest	4–5	Honvéd	Budapest
16:00 CEST (UTC+2)	Tisza 3'; Rajczi 12'; Dvorschák (yellow card) 38'; Széki 61'; Roiha 86'	Report	B. Tóth (yellow card) 37', (goal) 41'; Dieng 47', 54'; Magasföldi (yellow card) 58'; Debreceni (yellow card) 86', (goal) 88'; M. Tóth 90+2'	Stadium: Szusza Ferenc Stadion; Attendance: 1,153; Referee: Ádám Németh; Assistant referees: Lajos L. Tóth, Péter Berettyán

9 September 2007 3	Újpest	4–1	Paks	Budapest
19:00 CEST (UTC+2)	Salamon 23' (o.g.); G. Sándor 30', (yellow card) 51'; Dourandi 62'; Vermes (yellow card) 69'; Tisza 81'	Report	Tököli 27'; Buzás (red card) 43'; S. Horváth (yellow card) 66'	Stadium: Szusza Ferenc Stadion; Attendance: 1,362; Referee: Gergely Sulyok; Assistant referees: Tibor Vígh, János Agócs

19 September 2007 4	Paks	1–2	Újpest	Paks
16:00 CEST (UTC+2)	Balaskó (yellow card) 32'; Tamási 44'; Vári (yellow card) 51'; Z. Molnár (yellow card) 90+1'	Report	Korcsmár (yellow card) 17'; Lee 40'; Böjte (red card) 59'; Dourandi 67'; Kéthévoama (yellow card) 90+1'	Stadium: Fehérvári úti Stadion; Attendance: 300; Referee: József Erdős; Assistant referees: Vencel Tóth II, György Ring

2 October 2007 5	Újpest	4–3	Fehérvár	Budapest
17:00 CEST (UTC+2)	Kéthévoama (yellow card) 28', (goal) 50'; Dourandi 64'; Tisza 67'; Z. Kovács I 82'	Report	Dajić 22', 90'; Božić 44'; Csobánki (yellow card) 49'; Disztl (yellow card) 69'	Stadium: Szusza Ferenc Stadion; Attendance: 500; Referee: István Vad; Assistant referees: Zoltán Tompos, Zsolt Butkai

10 October 2007 6	Honvéd	1–1	Újpest	Budapest
18:00 CEST (UTC+2)	Smiljanić 58'; Mogyorósi (yellow card) 75'	Report	Tolnai (yellow card) 16'; Ogbodo (yellow card) 21'; Mészáros (yellow card) 63'; Dourandi 89'	Stadium: Bozsik József Stadion; Attendance: 1,000; Referee: Csaba Imre Sápi; Assistant referees: István Tóth, Balázs Farkas

===== Knockout phase =====
====== Quarter-finals ======
17 October 2007 First leg	Debrecen	3–0	Újpest	Debrecen
20:30 CEST (UTC+2)	Czvitkovics 29'; Rudolf (yellow card) 37'; Dombi (yellow card) 75'; Kerekes 78'; T. Sándor (yellow card) 83'; Kouemaha 90+2'	Report	Theobald (yellow card) 51'; Z. Kiss II (red card) 81'	Stadium: Oláh Gábor utcai Stadion; Attendance: 1,500; Referee: Mihály Fábián; Assistant referees: Dr. Zsolt Varga, Tamás Márkus

28 October 2007 Second leg	Újpest	0–0 (0–3 agg.)	Debrecen	Budapest
17:30 CET (UTC+1)	Vermes (yellow card) 6'; Sadjo (yellow card) 18'; Theobald (yellow card) 39'; Ogbodo (yellow card) 48'	Report	Kerekes (red card) 50'	Stadium: Szusza Ferenc Stadion; Attendance: 1,509; Referee: Abdul Rahman Hussein (Qatar); Assistant referees: Tibor Vámos (Hungary), Dharman (Qatar)
Note: Debrecen won 3–0 on aggregate.

==== Spring season ====
===== Group stage =====
Pos	Team	Pld	W	D	L	GF	GA	GD	Pts	Qualification	MTK	UJP	VAS	DIO
1	MTK	6	4	2	0	12	6	+6	14	Advance to knockout phase	—	2–0	3–2	2–1
2	Újpest	6	3	0	3	14	9	+5	9	Advance to knockout phase	1–3	—	1–2	3–1
3	Vasas	6	2	1	3	9	16	−7	7		1–1	0–7	—	4–1
4	Diósgyőr	6	1	1	4	8	12	−4	4		1–1	1–2	3–0	—

Source: HFF

1 December 2007 1	Újpest	1–3	MTK	Budapest
13:00 CET (UTC+1)	Vermes (yellow card) 60'; Moldovan 88'	Report	Pollák 29'; T. Kulcsár 55', 78'	Stadium: Szusza Ferenc Stadion; Attendance: 1,000; Referee: Csaba Imre Sápi; Assistant referees: Péter Berettyán, Attila Kelemen

5 December 2007 2	Újpest	3–1	Diósgyőr	Budapest
18:00 CET (UTC+1)	G. Sándor 29'; Bisoye (yellow card) 32'; Moldovan 50'; Z. Kovács I 63'; Mészáros (yellow card) 67'	Report	A. Simon 36'; Fodor (yellow card) 55'	Stadium: Szusza Ferenc Stadion; Attendance: 726; Referee: Tamás Arany; Assistant referees: Balázs Farkas, István Szécsényi

8 December 2007 3	Vasas	0–7	Újpest	Budapest
13:00 CET (UTC+1)	Pandur (yellow card) 26'	Report	Böjte (yellow card) 7'; Kéthévoama 8'; Tisza (yellow card) 13'; Z. Kovács I 18'; Moldovan 29'; Vermes 62'; Korcsmár 69'; O. Nagy 78'; Balog 87' (o.g.)	Stadium: Illovszky Rudolf Stadion; Attendance: 800; Referee: István Mészáros; Assistant referees: László Viszokai, Zoltán Tompos

16 February 2008 4	Diósgyőr	1–2	Újpest	Miskolc
14:00 CET (UTC+1)	Z. Pintér (yellow card) 4'; Elek (yellow card) 14'; V. Sebők (yellow card) 27'; Cardozo 52'; Mogyorósi (yellow card) 64'	Report	Dourandi 7'; Božić (yellow card) 62'; Tisza 67'	Stadium: Diósgyőri Stadion; Attendance: 3,000; Referee: István Mészáros; Assistant referees: László Viszokai, Ferenc Varga

20 February 2008 5	MTK	2–0	Újpest	Budapest
18:00 CET (UTC+1)	Lambulić 52'; Á. Szabó 78'	Report	Habi (yellow card) 52'	Stadium: Hidegkuti Nándor Stadion; Attendance: 400; Referee: Roland Veizer; Assistant referees: Lajos L. Tóth, Zsolt Márton

27 February 2008 6	Újpest	1–2	Vasas	Budapest
18:00 CET (UTC+1)	Györök 20'; Regedei (yellow card) 27'; Fűzfa (yellow card) 51'	Report	Unierzyski (yellow card) 19'; Lázok 51', 56'; Issiémou (yellow card) 67'	Stadium: Szusza Ferenc Stadion; Attendance: 1,023; Referee: János Takács; Assistant referees: Vencel Tóth II, Lajos L. Tóth

===== Knockout phase =====
====== Quarter-finals ======
5 March 2008 First leg	Újpest	1–5	Debrecen	Budapest
18:00 CET (UTC+1)	Hajdú 50'; Böjte (yellow card) 90'	Report	Stojkov 6'; Vukmir (yellow card) 53'; Kouemaha 59', 85'; Szűcs (yellow card) 63'; Huszák 65'; Leandro 77'; Spitzmüller (yellow card) 90'	Stadium: Szusza Ferenc Stadion; Attendance: 1,082; Referee: István Vad; Assistant referees: Tibor Vámos, Balázs Farkas

12 March 2008 Second leg	Debrecen	5–0 (10–1 agg.)	Újpest	Debrecen
17:00 CET (UTC+1)	Bogdanović 8' (pen.), 44', 54' (pen.), 77'; Rezes 13'	Report	Szalma (yellow card) 8'; Fűzfa (yellow card) 17'; Dvorschák (yellow card) 56'; Szolnoki (yellow card) 63'; Tolnai (yellow card) 80'	Stadium: Oláh Gábor utcai Stadion; Attendance: 3,000; Referee: Zoltán Iványi; Assistant referees: János Medovarszki, Gábor Kormányos II
Note: Debrecen won 10–1 on aggregate.
