= 2005–06 Újpest FC season =

Újpest
2005–06 season
- Manager: Géza Mészöly
- Stadium: Szusza Ferenc Stadion (Home stadium); Ferenc Puskás Stadium (Note: The match against Fehérvár was played at the Ferenc Puskás Stadium in Budapest, instead of Újpest regular stadium, the Szusza Ferenc Stadion in Budapest, after incidents at the Újpest v MTK match on 20 May 2006.)
- Nemzeti Bajnokság I: 2nd
- Magyar Kupa: Quarter-finals
- Highest home attendance: 15,000 v Fehérvár (3 June 2006, Nemzeti Bajnokság I)
- Lowest home attendance: 2,231 v Makó (26 October 2005, Magyar Kupa)
- Average home league attendance: 5,451
- Biggest win: 7–0 v Szolnoki Spartacus (Away, 11 September 2005, Magyar Kupa); 8–1 v Makó (Home, 26 October 2005, Magyar Kupa); 7–0 v Honvéd (Home, 22 April 2006, Nemzeti Bajnokság I)
- Biggest defeat: 0–2 v Pécs (Away, 18 March 2006, Nemzeti Bajnokság I); 0–2 v Debrecen (Away, 5 April 2006, Magyar Kupa); 1–3 v Fehérvár (Home, 3 June 2006, Nemzeti Bajnokság I)

The 2005–06 season was Újpest Football Club's 101st competitive season, 95th consecutive season in the Nemzeti Bajnokság I and 106th season in existence as a football club. In addition to the domestic league, Újpest participated in that season's editions of the Magyar Kupa.

== Squad ==
Squad at end of season

Note: Flags indicate national team as defined under FIFA eligibility rules; some limited exceptions apply. Players may hold more than one non-FIFA nationality.

No.	Pos.	Nation	Player
1	GK	HUN	Dániel Illyés
2	DF	HUN	Tamás Tolnai
3	DF	HUN	Dániel Lettrich
4	MF	HUN	Máté Gulyás
5	MF	HUN	György Sándor
6	MF	HUN	András Kőhalmi
7	DF	HUN	Vilmos Vanczák
8	FW	HUN	Péter Rajczi
9	FW	ARG	Lucas Cariati
10	FW	HUN	Zoltán Kovács
11	MF	HUN	Zsolt Korcsmár
13	FW	HUN	János Szőke
14	MF	HUN	István Vituska

No.	Pos.	Nation	Player
16	FW	HUN	Gábor Freud
17	MF	HUN	Károly Erős
18	DF	HUN	Ákos Füzi
19	DF	HUN	Tamás Vaskó
20	MF	HUN	Norbert Tóth
21	MF	HUN	Balázs Tóth
22	MF	HUN	Attila Hullám
24	DF	HUN	Attila Böjte
25	DF	HUN	Krisztián Vermes
26	GK	HUN	Géza Vlaszák
28	FW	HUN	Tibor Tisza
29	GK	HUN	Zoltán Györök

== Competitions ==
=== Overview ===
Competition	First match	Last match	Starting round	Final position	Record							
Competition	First match	Last match	Starting round	Final position	Pld	W	D	L	GF	GA	GD	Win %
Nemzeti Bajnokság I	31 July 2005	3 June 2006	Matchday 1	2nd	30	20	5	5	74	37	+37	66.67
Magyar Kupa	11 September 2005	5 April 2006	Second round	Quarter-finals	6	4	0	2	19	4	+15	66.67
Total					36	24	5	7	93	41	+52	66.67

Source: Competitions

=== Nemzeti Bajnokság I ===
==== League table ====
Pos	Team	Pld	W	D	L	GF	GA	GD	Pts	Qualification or relegation
1	Debrecen (C)	30	20	8	2	69	34	+35	68	Qualification for Champions League second qualifying round
2	Újpest	30	20	5	5	74	37	+37	65	Qualification for UEFA Cup first qualifying round (Note: Videoton FC Fehérvár won the 2005–06 Hungarian Cup and thereby qualified for the first qualifying round of the UEFA Cup.)
3	Fehérvár	30	19	7	4	52	24	+28	64	Qualification for UEFA Cup first qualifying round
4	MTK	30	18	6	6	65	33	+32	60	
5	Tatabánya	30	11	8	11	46	45	+1	41	

Source: RSSSF
(C) Champions

==== Results summary ====
Overall								Home						Away					
Pld	W	D	L	GF	GA	GD	Pts	W	D	L	GF	GA	GD	W	D	L	GF	GA	GD
30	20	5	5	74	37	+37	65	12	1	2	47	18	+29	8	4	3	27	19	+8

Source: Competitions

==== Results by round ====
Round	1	2	3	4	5	6	7	8	9	10	11	12	13	14	15	16	17	18	19	20	21	22	23	24	25	26	27	28	29	30
Ground	A	H	A	H	A	H	A	H	A	H	A	H	A	H	A	H	A	H	A	H	A	H	A	H	A	H	A	H	A	H
Result	W	D	W	W	D	W	D	W	L	W	W	W	W	W	D	W	W	W	L	W	D	W	W	W	L	W	W	L	W	L
Position	5	5	2	1	3	2	2	3	4	4	4	3	2	1	1	1	1	1	1	1	1	1	1	1	1	1	1	1	1	2
Points	3	4	7	10	11	14	15	18	18	21	24	27	30	33	34	37	40	43	43	46	47	50	53	56	56	59	62	62	65	65

A = Away; H = Home; W = Win; D = Draw; L = Loss

==== Matches ====
31 July 2005 1	Diósgyőr	0–1	Újpest	Miskolc
11:00 CEST (UTC+2)	Halgas (yellow card) 56'; Z. Pintér (yellow card) 71'	Report	Erős (yellow card) 18'; G. Sándor (yellow card) 31'; Vanczák (red card) 52'; Mogyorósi 58' (o.g.); Feczesin (yellow card) 82'	Stadium: Diósgyőri Stadion; Attendance: 7,000; Referee: János Megyebíró; Assistant referees: Szpisják, P. Tóth

6 August 2005 2	Újpest	2–2	Vasas	Budapest
19:00 CEST (UTC+2)	Z. Kovács I 18', (yellow card) 45'; Vituska (yellow card) 65'; Vaskó 86'	Report	N. Németh (yellow card) 20'; Füzi (yellow card) 22'; Z. Molnár (yellow card) 31'; Bárányos 42' (pen.); Janjić (yellow card) 69'; Waltner 74'	Stadium: Szusza Ferenc Stadion; Attendance: 4,000; Referee: Viktor Kassai; Assistant referees: G. Erős, A. Kelemen

20 August 2005 3	Rákospalota	2–3	Újpest	Budapest
17:00 CEST (UTC+2)	Somorjai 44'; Polonkai (yellow card) 45'; Földvári 50'	Report	Z. Kovács I 6', 25'; Vanczák (yellow card) 13' (yellow-red card) 34'; Böjte (yellow card) 18'; Rajczi (yellow card) 43'; Kőhalmi 81'; Vaskó (yellow card) 83'	Stadium: Budai II. László Stadion; Attendance: 5,500; Referee: Attila Dubraviczky; Assistant referees: I. A. Nagy, I. Tóth

27 August 2005 4	Újpest	5–1	Pécs	Budapest
19:00 CEST (UTC+2)	Kőhalmi (yellow card); Vaskó (yellow card); Rajczi 25', 38', 70'; Z. Kovács I 34', 62'	Report	Pavičević (yellow card); Balaskó 54' (pen.)	Stadium: Szusza Ferenc Stadion; Attendance: 3,320; Referee: Mihály Fábián; Assistant referees: Márkus, L. Tóth L. Fourth official: Sóthy

19 September 2005 5	Debrecen	2–2	Újpest	Debrecen
19:00 CEST (UTC+2)	P. Máté II 5'; Dombi (yellow card) 37'; Halmosi (red card) 53'; Z. Kiss I (yellow card) 64'; Brnović 66'	Report	Z. Kovács I 39'; N. Tóth (yellow card) 62', (goal) 78' (pen.); B. Tóth (yellow card) 84'	Stadium: Oláh Gábor utcai Stadion; Attendance: 8,000; Referee: Ferenc Bede; Assistant referees: T. Vámos, Tompos

24 September 2005 6	Újpest	5–1	Tatabánya	Budapest
19:00 CEST (UTC+2)	Erős 22'; G. Sándor 28'; Rajczi 32', 74'; Z. Kovács I 80'	Report	Z. Balogh (yellow card) 72'; Márkus 75'; Jerson (yellow card) 88'	Stadium: Szusza Ferenc Stadion; Attendance: 4,345; Referee: Péter Solymosi; Assistant referees: G. Takács, T. Vígh

1 October 2005 7	Sopron	1–1	Újpest	Sopron
18:00 CEST (UTC+2)	Landerl 4'; Coțan (yellow card) 24'	Report	Demjén 2' (o.g.); Vlaszák (red card) 48'	Stadium: Káposztás utcai Stadion; Attendance: 3,200; Referee: Tamás Arany; Assistant referees: T. Vámos, Z. Kovács

16 October 2005 8	Újpest	2–1	Ferencváros	Budapest
11:30 CEST (UTC+2)	N. Tóth (yellow card) 52'; Vermes 79'; Z. Kovács I 90+2'	Report	Zo. Balog (yellow card) 25'; Böjte 30' (o.g.); Laczkó (yellow card) 32'; Tőzsér (yellow card) 71'	Stadium: Szusza Ferenc Stadion; Attendance: 8,000; Referee: János Megyebíró; Assistant referees: Szpisják, P. Tóth

22 October 2005 9	Honvéd	1–0	Újpest	Budapest
18:00 CEST (UTC+2)	Z. Takács 65'; Genito (yellow card) 89'	Report	Freud (yellow card) 33' (yellow-red card) 43'; Böjte (red card) 90+2'	Stadium: Bozsik József Stadion; Attendance: 7,000; Referee: Attila Dubraviczky; Assistant referees: Hegyi, Kispál

29 October 2005 10	Újpest	3–1	Pápa	Budapest
18:00 CEST (UTC+2)	Feczesin 33', 38', (yellow card) 41'; Vaskó (yellow card) 61'; N. Tóth 67' (pen.)	Report	Remili (yellow card) 39'; A. Farkas 45'	Stadium: Szusza Ferenc Stadion; Attendance: 3,567; Referee: István Vad; Assistant referees: Z. Szalai, I. Albert

6 November 2005 11	Zalaegerszeg	1–3	Újpest	Zalaegerszeg
11:30 CET (UTC+1)	V. Sebők 59' (pen.)	Report	Rajczi 22'; V. Sebők 65' (o.g.); Csóka 74' (o.g.)	Stadium: ZTE Arena; Attendance: 3,000; Referee: Tamás Arany; Assistant referees: Dr. Szabó, I. A. Nagy

19 November 2005 12	Újpest	4–1	Kaposvár	Budapest
17:00 CET (UTC+1)	Rajczi 11'; G. Sándor 16'; Erős (yellow card) 59'; Vanczák (yellow card) 61'; N. Tóth 60' (pen.), 75' (pen.)	Report	Zahorecz 25' (pen.), (yellow card) 89'; T. Hegedűs (yellow card) 36'	Stadium: Szusza Ferenc Stadion; Attendance: 3,485; Referee: Viktor Kassai; Assistant referees: G. Erőss, A. Kelemen

26 November 2005 13	MTK	0–2	Újpest	Budapest
17:00 CET (UTC+1)	Jezdimirović (yellow card) 7'; Pollák (yellow card) 75'	Report	Rajczi 20', 52'; Vanczák (yellow card) 28'	Stadium: Hidegkuti Nándor Stadion; Attendance: 4,000; Referee: Csaba Imre Sápi; Assistant referees: Tibor Vígh, Lajos L. Tóth

4 December 2005 14	Újpest	3–1	Győr	Budapest
11:30 CET (UTC+1)	Rajczi 45'; Feczesin 58'; Jäkl 77' (o.g.); Vituska (yellow card) 90+2'	Report	Bajzát (yellow card) 11'; Makra (yellow card) 14'; Vincze (yellow card) 23'; Pusztai (yellow card) 34'; Mátyus 51', (yellow card) 82'	Stadium: Szusza Ferenc Stadion; Attendance: 3,435; Referee: Zsolt Szabó; Assistant referees: Kispál, Hegyi

11 December 2005 15	Fehérvár	1–1	Újpest	Székesfehérvár
11:30 CET (UTC+1)	B. Farkas II (yellow card) 40' (yellow-red card) 75'; Simek 50'	Report	G. Sándor (yellow card) 3'; Feczesin 24'; Böjte (yellow card) 80'	Stadium: Sóstói Stadion; Attendance: 10,000; Referee: István Vad; Assistant referees: Z. Tompos, T. Vámos

25 February 2006 16	Újpest	3–2	Diósgyőr	Budapest
15:00 CET (UTC+1)	Rajczi 7', 69'; Tisza 19'	Report	Elek 76'; Sipeki 86'	Stadium: Szusza Ferenc Stadion; Attendance: 4,086; Referee: Attila Hanacsek; Assistant referees: P. Kovács, I. A. Nagy

4 March 2006 17	Vasas	2–3	Újpest	Budapest
15:00 CET (UTC+1)	Gyánó 3', (yellow card) 37'; Bárányos 13'; A. Tóth (yellow card) 29'; Kapič (yellow card) 45'; Z. Pintér (yellow card) 76'; G. Hegedűs (yellow card) 85'	Report	Rajczi 49', 52'; B. Tóth (yellow card) 68'; N. Tóth 76'	Stadium: Illovszky Rudolf Stadion; Attendance: 6,000; Referee: Zsolt Szabó; Assistant referees: Kispál, Erős

11 March 2006 18	Újpest	2–0	Rákospalota	Budapest
16:00 CET (UTC+1)	G. Sándor (yellow card) 15'; Rajczi 45', 86'	Report	Kapcsos (yellow card) 38'; Tamási (yellow card) 41'; G. Horváth I (yellow card) 48'	Stadium: Szusza Ferenc Stadion; Attendance: 4,320; Referee: Szabolcs Saskőy; Assistant referees: F. Székely, J. Heibl

18 March 2006 19	Pécs	2–0	Újpest	Pécs
15:00 CET (UTC+1)	Kulcsár 17', (yellow card) 59'; Pavičević (yellow card) 77'; Sipos 88'	Report	B. Tóth (yellow card) 46'; Böjte (yellow card) 71'	Stadium: Stadion PMFC; Attendance: 3,500; Referee: Ferenc Bede; Assistant referees: Tompos, Szalai

26 March 2006 20	Újpest	2–1	Debrecen	Budapest
11:30 CEST (UTC+2)	P. Máté II 38' (o.g.); Rajczi (yellow card) 43'; Vaskó (yellow card) 64'; Z. Kovács I 90+2'	Report	Nikolov (yellow card) 29', (goal) 62'; Csernyánszki (yellow card) 52'; Szatmári (yellow card) 61'; Halmosi (yellow card) 70'; Bernáth (yellow card) 73'	Stadium: Szusza Ferenc Stadion; Attendance: 5,122; Referee: Zsolt Szabó; Assistant referees: P. Kovács, B. Gaál

1 April 2006 21	Tatabánya	1–1	Újpest	Tatabánya
15:00 CEST (UTC+2)	Z. Tóth 26'; Deme (yellow card) 58'; Z. Balogh (yellow card) 89'	Report	Hullám (yellow card) 42'; B. Tóth (yellow card) 64'; N. Tóth 74'	Stadium: Városi Stadion; Attendance: 5,000; Referee: István Vad; Assistant referees: P. Szabó, Z. Kovács

8 April 2006 22	Újpest	2–1	Sopron	Budapest
15:00 CEST (UTC+2)	Hullám (yellow card) 10'; Tisza 31'; Erős (yellow card) 61'; Rajczi 78' (pen.)	Report	A. Horváth 61' (pen.); Coțan (yellow card) 71'; Silvestri (yellow card) 85'; Sifter (yellow card) 90+1'	Stadium: Szusza Ferenc Stadion; Attendance: 4,215; Referee: Viktor Kassai; Assistant referees: Erős, Kelemen

16 April 2006 23	Ferencváros	1–2	Újpest	Budapest
11:30 CEST (UTC+2)	Lipcsei (yellow card) 12', (goal) 19' (pen.); Bajevski (yellow card) 33'; Tímár (yellow card) 58'; Botiș (red card) 90+5'	Report	G. Sándor (yellow card) 1'; Böjte (yellow card) 44' (yellow-red card) 90'; Vanczák (yellow card) 71'; Rajczi (yellow card) 90+3', (goal) 90+5' (pen.); Z. Kovács I 90+2', (red card) (after the match)	Stadium: Üllői úti Stadion; Attendance: 8,000; Referee: Szabolcs Saskőy; Assistant referees: P. Kovács, J. Heibl

22 April 2006 24	Újpest	7–0	Honvéd	Budapest
15:00 CEST (UTC+2)	Vermes 11'; Lucas 44'; Füzi 49'; Tisza 59'; G. Sándor 67'; Hullám 83'; Vaskó (yellow card) 90'; Vituska 90'	Report	Z. Kovács II (yellow card) 20' (yellow-red card) 75'; Z. Takács (yellow card) 28'; N. Kovács (yellow card) 58'; Zambo (yellow card) 68'	Stadium: Szusza Ferenc Stadion; Attendance: 7,000; Referee: Péter Solymosi; Assistant referees: G. Erős, I. A. Nagy

28 April 2006 25	Pápa	2–1	Újpest	Pápa
19:00 CEST (UTC+2)	D. Varga (yellow card) 38'; Kincses (yellow card) 41'; Fabinho 43'; Honma 51'; Simpson (yellow card) 81' (yellow-red card) 90+2'	Report	Erős (yellow card) 57'; Füzi (yellow card) 60'; Vituska (yellow card) 85'; N. Tóth 87'	Stadium: Perutz Stadion; Attendance: 2,500; Referee: Ferenc Bede; Assistant referees: Kispál, Tompos

7 May 2006 26	Újpest	5–1	Zalaegerszeg	Budapest
11:30 CEST (UTC+2)	Z. Kovács I 24', 75'; Rajczi 26', 86'; N. Tóth 30' (pen.); Tisza (yellow card) 34' (yellow-red card) 60'; Erős (yellow card) 45'	Report	Kaj (yellow card) 45'; V. Sebők 51' (pen.), (yellow card) 61'; Sági (yellow card) 54'	Stadium: Szusza Ferenc Stadion; Attendance: 4,021; Referee: János Megyebíró; Assistant referees: R. Kispál, Z. Szalai

14 May 2006 27	Kaposvár	1–2	Újpest	Kaposvár
11:30 CEST (UTC+2)	P. Máté I (yellow card) 40'; Alves 59'	Report	Kőhalmi (yellow card) 14'; Z. Kovács I 20'; N. Tóth 63' (pen.); B. Tóth (yellow card) 78'; Erős (yellow card) 81'	Stadium: Rákóczi Stadion; Attendance: 5,000; Referee: Zsolt Szabó; Assistant referees: G. Erős, Z. Kovács

20 May 2006 28	Újpest	1–2	MTK	Budapest
15:00 CEST (UTC+2)	Rajczi 36', (yellow card) 39'; Vanczák (yellow card) 76' (yellow-red card) 89'; Hullám (red card) 88'	Report	B. Balogh (yellow card) 19'; L. Horváth (yellow card) 69'; Jezdimirović (yellow card) 75'; Kanta 88', (yellow card) 88'; Lambulić 90'	Stadium: Szusza Ferenc Stadion; Attendance: 7,855; Referee: Ferenc Bede; Assistant referees: I. A. Nagy, P. Tóth

28 May 2006 29	Győr	2–5	Újpest	Győr
11:30 CEST (UTC+2)	Pusztai (yellow card) 9'; Vincze 40', (yellow card) 44'; Zs. Szabó 52'; Mátyus (yellow card) 54'; G. Varga (yellow card) 76'; Granát (yellow card) 90+1'	Report	Tisza 5'; Rajczi 35', (yellow card) 73'; N. Tóth 54'; Lucas 70', (red card) 90+1'; Vaskó 78'	Stadium: Stadion ETO; Attendance: 4,000; Referee: István Vad; Assistant referees: T. Vámos, T. Vígh

3 June 2006 30	Újpest	1–3	Fehérvár	Budapest
16:20 CEST (UTC+2)	B. Tóth (yellow card) 30'; Rajczi (red card) 42'; Tisza 63'; N. Tóth (red card) 78'	Report	Dajić (yellow card) 23'; Csizmadia 69'; Z. Vincze (yellow card) 74'; D. Nagy 78', (yellow card) 78'; F. Horváth 90+2'	Stadium: Ferenc Puskás Stadium; Attendance: 15,000; Referee: Attila Hanacsek; Assistant referees: L. Tóth. L., Tompos

=== Magyar Kupa ===
11 September 2005 Second round	Szolnoki Spartacus	0–7	Újpest	Szolnok
	Pataki (yellow card)	Report	G. Sándor 2x; Z. Kovács I 2x; Rajczi 2x; N. Tóth	Stadium: Véső utca Attendance: 3,000; Referee: János Megyebíró; Assistant referees: Szpisják, P. Tóth

27 September 2005 Third round	Kisbágyon	0–3	Újpest	Kisbágyon
15:30 CEST (UTC+2)	Jele (yellow card); Kresák (yellow card); I. Varga (yellow card)	Report	Kőhalmi 24', 88'; N. Tóth 83' (pen.), (yellow card); Erős (yellow card)	Stadium: Kisbágyoni Sportpálya; Attendance: 1,000; Referee: Zsolt Szabó; Assistant referees: Z. Szalai, G. Oláh

==== Round of 16 ====
26 October 2005 First leg	Újpest	8–1	Makó	Budapest
18:00 CEST (UTC+2)	G. Sándor 28', 48', 54', 71'; Feczesin 40', 69'; Kőhalmi 43'; Hullám 90+1'	Report	Szélpál (yellow card); Schreiber 45'	Stadium: Szusza Ferenc Stadion; Attendance: 2,231; Referee: Ferenc Bede; Assistant referees: Á. Telek, I. Tóth

9 November 2005 Second leg	Makó	0–1 (1–9 agg.)	Újpest	Makó
12:30 CET (UTC+1)		Report	Rajczi 12'	Stadium: Erdei Ferenc téri Sporttelep; Attendance: 700; Referee: S. Szabó; Assistant referees: Medovarszki, Vári
Note: Újpest won 9–1 on aggregate.

==== Quarter-finals ====
15 March 2006 First leg	Újpest	0–1	Debrecen	Budapest
18:00 CET (UTC+1)	Erős (yellow card) 9'; N. Tóth (yellow card) 15'; G. Sándor (yellow card) 17'	Report	Nikolov (yellow card) 20'; Dombi (yellow card) 38' (yellow-red card) 45'; Csernyánszki (yellow card) 61'; Sidibe 68' (pen.)	Stadium: Szusza Ferenc Stadion; Attendance: 4,358; Referee: Attila Dubraviczky; Assistant referees: I. Tóth, A. Nagy I

5 April 2006 Second leg	Debrecen	2–0 (3–0 agg.)	Újpest	Debrecen
18:00 CEST (UTC+2)	Szatmári (yellow card) 18'; Sidibe 24' (pen.), (yellow card) 63'; B. Virág 30'; Halmosi (yellow card) 32'; T. Sándor (yellow card) 54'	Report	Vlaszák (yellow card) 24'; Vaskó (yellow card) 59'; N. Tóth (yellow card) 62'	Stadium: Oláh Gábor utcai Stadion; Attendance: 6,500; Referee: Mihály Fábián; Assistant referees: Ortó, Márkus
Note: Debrecen won 3–0 on aggregate.
