= 2007–08 Rákospalotai EAC season =

Rákospalota
2007–08 season
- Owner: József Forgács
- Chairman: Róbert Kutasi
- Manager: Zoltán Aczél
- Stadium: Budai II. László Stadion (Home stadium); Káposztás utcai Stadion (Temporary stadium)
- Nemzeti Bajnokság I: 12th
- Magyar Kupa: Round of 32
- Ligakupa: Autumn season: Quarter-finals; Spring season: Quarter-finals
- Top goalscorer: League: Gábor Torma (11); All: Gábor Torma (17)
Home colours	Away colours

The 2007–08 season was Rákospalotai Egyetértés Atlétikai Club's or shortly REAC's (Sopron REAC from spring) 61st competitive season, 3rd consecutive season in the Nemzeti Bajnokság I and 95th year in existence as a football club. In addition to the domestic league, Rákospalota participated in this season's editions of the Magyar Kupa and Ligakupa.

According to the HFF decision, from 1 January 2008 only stadiums with electric lighting were allowed to host league matches. As the club not have lighting in their stadium, they welcomed their opponents in the spring at the home of Sopron as Sopron REAC. The city's main club, Sopron, has been fined and had its license revoked. With this solution football continued there.

== Kits ==
Home	Home alt.	Away	Alternate (Note: It was used for home matches during the relocation to Sopron.)

== First team squad ==
The players listed had league appearances and stayed until the end of the season.

Note: Flags indicate national team as defined under FIFA eligibility rules; some limited exceptions apply. Players may hold more than one non-FIFA nationality.

No.	Pos.	Nation	Player
1	GK	HUN	Mátyás Esterházy
2	DF	HUN	Balázs Dinka
5	DF	HUN	Balázs Sallai
6	MF	HUN	András Kőhalmi
7	MF	HUN	Gergő Cseri
8	DF	HUN	Vince Kapcsos
9	MF	HUN	Zoltán Varga
10	FW	HUN	Gábor Torma
11	FW	HUN	Krisztián Nyerges
12	GK	HUN	Levente Szántai
13	MF	HUN	Tamás Kiss

No.	Pos.	Nation	Player
14	MF	HUN	Balázs Kovács
15	MF	HUN	Roland Dancs
17	DF	HUN	Gábor Horváth
21	MF	HUN	András Selei (loaned from MTK)
22	MF	HUN	Tamás Somorjai (loaned from Vasas)
23	MF	HUN	Gergő Rása (loaned from Újpest)
24	MF	HUN	Norbert Zana
26	DF	HUN	Tamás Gasparik
29	MF	HUN	Károly Erős
30	DF	HUN	Olivér Pusztai

== Transfers ==
=== Transfers in ===
Transfer window	Pos.	No.	Player	From	Ref
Summer	GK	–	(Hungary) Gergely Szalay	MTK	
Summer	GK	1	(Hungary) Dániel Botlik	Vasas	
Summer	MF	3	(Hungary) Aladár Virág	Debrecen	
Summer	FW	4	(Hungary) Tamás Nagy	Tatabánya	
Summer	MF	6	(Hungary) András Kőhalmi	Újpest	
Summer	MF	9	(Hungary) Zoltán Varga	Pécs	
Summer	GK	12	(Hungary) Levente Szántai	Soroksár	
Summer	N/A	15	(Hungary) Kristóf Schlafer	Vasas	
Summer	FW	19	(Hungary) Franck Matondo	(Germany) Pforzheim	
Summer	MF	21	(Hungary) Csaba Madar	Nyíregyháza	
Summer	MF	29	(Hungary) Károly Erős	Újpest	
Summer	MF	29	(Hungary) Attila Héger	Újpest	
Summer	DF	30	(Hungary) Olivér Pusztai	Győr	
Winter	GK	1	(Hungary) Mátyás Esterházy	Kecskemét	
Winter	MF	15	(Hungary) Roland Dancs	Sopron	
Winter	MF	24	(Hungary) Norbert Zana	Sopron	

=== Transfers out ===
Transfer window	Pos.	No.	Player	To	Ref
Summer	FW	–	(Hungary) Márton Göntér	Haladás VSE	
Summer	N/A	–	(Hungary) László Csorba	Bánk	
Summer	N/A	–	(Hungary) Roland Szűcs	Bánk	
Summer	GK	1	(Hungary) Dániel Illyés	End of contract	
Summer	DF	3	(Hungary) Csaba Regedei	Újpest	
Summer	MF	6	(Hungary) Balázs Schrancz	Felcsút	
Summer	FW	21	(Hungary) Sándor Török	Felcsút	
Summer	MF	23	(Hungary) Tamás Somorjai	Vasas	
Summer	MF	24	(Hungary) Norbert Tóth	Zalaegerszeg	
Winter	GK	1	(Hungary) Balázs Farkas	Pécs	
Winter	MF	3	(Hungary) Aladár Virág	Diósgyőr	
Winter	FW	4	(Hungary) Tamás Nagy	(Faroe Islands) B36 Tórshavn	
Winter	FW	19	(Hungary) Franck Matondo	(Austria) Melk	
Winter	MF	21	(Hungary) Csaba Madar	Hajdúszoboszló	
Winter	MF	22	(Hungary) Attila Polonkai	Fehérvár	
Winter	FW	24	(Hungary) Péter Kocsis	BKV Előre	

=== Loans in ===
Transfer window	Pos.	No.	Player	From	End date	Ref
Summer	MF	23	(Hungary) Gergő Rása	Újpest	End of season	
Winter	MF	21	(Hungary) András Selei	MTK	End of season	
Winter	MF	23	(Hungary) Tamás Somorjai	Vasas	End of season	

=== Loans out ===
Transfer window	Pos.	No.	Player	To	End date	Ref
Winter	N/A	17	(Hungary) Sándor Imre	Bicske	End of season	

== Friendlies ==
REAC played the first match after the renovation of the Sport utca Stadion, the Szigetszentmiklós pitch, which has been in existence since the 1930s.

9 September 2007 Friendly	Szigetszentmiklós	1–1	Rákospalota	Szigetszentmiklós
				Stadium: Sport utcai Stadion

== Competitions ==
=== Overview ===
Competition	First match	Last match	Starting round	Final position	Record							
Competition	First match	Last match	Starting round	Final position	Pld	W	D	L	GF	GA	GD	Win %
Nemzeti Bajnokság I	22 July 2007	1 June 2008	Matchday 1	12th	30	7	9	14	42	60	−18	23.33
Magyar Kupa	29 August 2007	25 September 2007	Third round	Round of 32	2	1	0	1	9	4	+5	50.00
Ligakupa (Autumn season)	22 August 2007	27 October 2007	Group stage	Quarter-finals	8	2	2	4	14	17	−3	25.00
Ligakupa (Spring season)	30 November 2007	12 March 2008	Group stage	Quarter-finals	8	3	1	4	9	20	−11	37.50
Total					48	13	12	23	74	101	−27	27.08

Source: Competitions

=== Nemzeti Bajnokság I ===
==== League table ====
Pos	Team	Pld	W	D	L	GF	GA	GD	Pts
10	Nyíregyháza	30	11	7	12	34	37	−3	40
11	Paks	30	9	10	11	51	51	0	37
12	Rákospalota	30	7	9	14	42	60	−18	30
13	Diósgyőr	30	5	13	12	43	63	−20	28
14	Siófok	30	6	9	15	33	46	−13	27

Source: soccerway.com

==== Results summary ====
Overall								Home						Away					
Pld	W	D	L	GF	GA	GD	Pts	W	D	L	GF	GA	GD	W	D	L	GF	GA	GD
30	7	9	14	42	60	−18	30	5	5	5	26	30	−4	2	4	9	16	30	−14

Source: Hungarian Football Federation

==== Results by round ====
Round	1	2	3	4	5	6	7	8	9	10	11	12	13	14	15	16	17	18	19	20	21	22	23	24	25	26	27	28	29	30
Ground	H	H	A	H	A	A	H	A	H	A	H	A	H	A	H	A	A	H	A	H	H	A	H	A	H	A	H	A	H	A
Result	L	W	L	W	L	L	L	W	D	W	L	L	L	L	D	D	L	D	D	D	W	L	W	D	D	L	W	D	L	L
Position	15	9	11	9	11	11	12	11	11	9	10	10	10	12	11	11	12	12	12	13	12	12	12	12	12	12	12	12	12	12

Source: Matches
A = Away; H = Home; W = Win; D = Draw; L = Loss

==== Matches ====
22 July 2007 1	Rákospalota	0–3	Honvéd	Budapest
18:00 CEST (UTC+2)	Polonkai (yellow card) 41'; Dinka (yellow card) 57'	Report	Schindler (yellow card) 18'; Bárányos 39'; Guié 53'; Pomper 59'	Stadium: Budai II. László Stadion; Attendance: 2,300; Referee: Mihály Fábián

30 July 2007 2	Rákospalota	2–0	Vasas	Budapest
18:00 CEST (UTC+2)	Erős (yellow card) 29'; Cseri (yellow card) 33'; Madar 44'; Kőhalmi 79'; Torma (red card) 84'	Report	A. Tóth (yellow card) 57'	Stadium: Budai II. László Stadion; Attendance: 1,100; Referee: István Mészáros

4 August 2007 3	Nyíregyháza	2–0	Rákospalota	Nyíregyháza
17:30 CEST (UTC+2)	Lippai 52'; Bagoly (yellow card) 67', (goal) 82'; Vukadinović (yellow card) 84'	Report	Kapcsos (yellow card) 21'; Polonkai (yellow card) 90+1'	Stadium: Városi Stadion; Attendance: 4,000; Referee: Zoltán Iványi

11 August 2007 4	Rákospalota	3–2	Tatabánya	Budapest
17:00 CEST (UTC+2)	Nyerges 9', 62'; Torma 13'; G. Horváth (yellow card) 45'; Erős (yellow card) 53'; T. Nagy (yellow card) 66'	Report	Filó 60'; Nógrád 89'; Dienes (red card) 90'; Ughy (yellow card) 90+3'	Stadium: Budai II. László Stadion; Attendance: 700; Referee: Ferenc Bede

18 August 2007 5	Győr	2–1	Rákospalota	Győr
17:30 CEST (UTC+2)	Bank (yellow card) 42'; Bajzát 62'; Bogdanović 83'; Völgyi (yellow card) 87'	Report	Kapcsos 76'	Stadium: ETO Park; Attendance: 3,000; Referee: Tamás Bognár

25 August 2007 6	Sopron	2–1	Rákospalota	Sopron
19:00 CEST (UTC+2)	Sira (yellow card) 17'; Belić 37', 85'; Reinhardt (yellow card) 50'; Pintér (yellow card) 52'	Report	Kapcsos (yellow card) 49'; Torma 68'; Z. Varga (yellow card) 90'; Polonkai (yellow card) 90+3'	Stadium: Káposztás utcai Stadion; Attendance: 3,000; Referee: Zsolt Szabó

1 September 2007 7	Rákospalota	0–2	Fehérvár	Budapest
16:30 CEST (UTC+2)	G. Horváth (yellow card) 37'; Sallai (yellow card) 63'; Kőhalmi (yellow card) 79'	Report	Simek 22', 34'; Sitku (yellow card) 77'	Stadium: Budai II. László Stadion; Attendance: 1,200; Referee: Péter Solymosi

15 September 2007 8	Paks	0–2	Rákospalota	Paks
16:30 CEST (UTC+2)	Salamon (yellow card) 29'	Report	Torma 30'; Nyerges 36'; G. Horváth (yellow card) 56'; Erős (yellow card) 61'	Stadium: Fehérvári úti Stadion; Attendance: 800; Referee: Zoltán Iványi

22 September 2007 9	Rákospalota	1–1	Újpest	Budapest
16:00 CEST (UTC+2)	Polonkai 34'; Cseri (yellow card) 57'	Report	Do-kweon 65'	Stadium: Budai II. László Stadion; Attendance: 2,800; Referee: Tamás Arany

29 September 2007 10	Diósgyőr	0–1	Rákospalota	Miskolc
18:00 CEST (UTC+2)	Hegedűs (yellow card) 10'; N. Farkas (yellow card) 60'	Report	Rása (yellow card) 43'; G. Horváth (yellow card) 50'; Torma (yellow card) 81'; Erős (yellow card) 82'; Nyerges 90'	Stadium: Diósgyőri Stadion; Attendance: 9,000; Referee: József Berger

6 October 2007 11	Rákospalota	0–4	Debrecen	Budapest
15:00 CEST (UTC+2)	Kapcsos (red card) 48'	Report	Z. Kiss 41'; Dzsudzsák (yellow card) 47', (goal) 90'; Kouemaha 49'; Sándor 52', (yellow card) 62'	Stadium: Budai II. László Stadion; Attendance: 1,000; Referee: Zoltán Iványi

20 October 2007 12	Siófok	1–0	Rákospalota	Siófok
18:00 CEST (UTC+2)	S. Kanta 78'	Report		Stadium: Révész Street Stadium; Attendance: 1,200; Referee: Gergely Sulyok

3 November 2007 13	Rákospalota	1–2	Zalaegerszeg	Budapest
13:30 CEST (UTC+2)	Pusztai 8'; Rása (yellow card) 26'; B. Kovács (yellow card) 76'	Report	Z. Tóth 18'; Méyé 76' (pen.); Dudić (yellow card) 90+2'	Stadium: Budai II. László Stadion; Attendance: 400; Referee: Mihály Fábián

12 November 2007 14	MTK	3–0	Rákospalota	Budapest
18:00 CEST (UTC+2)	Pátkai 17'; Zsidai (yellow card) 21'; Pál 60'; Bori 70'	Report	Madar (yellow card) 14'; Pusztai (yellow card) 83'	Stadium: Hidegkuti Nándor Stadion; Attendance: 500; Referee: Ferenc Bede

24 November 2007 15	Rákospalota	1–1	Kaposvár	Budapest
13:00 CEST (UTC+2)	G. Horváth (yellow card) 32'; Erős (yellow card) 35'; Torma 90'	Report	da Silva 45'; Maróti (yellow card) 47'	Stadium: Budai II. László Stadion; Attendance: 800; Referee: Tamás Arany

23 February 2008 16	Honvéd	1–1	Rákospalota	Budapest
16:00 CEST (UTC+2)	Filó 29'; Smiljanić (yellow card) 57'	Report	Torma 60'; G. Horváth (yellow card) 65'	Stadium: Bozsik József Stadion; Attendance: 1,700; Referee: Tamás Bognár

3 March 2008 17	Vasas	2–1	Rákospalota	Budapest
18:00 CEST (UTC+2)	Piller 9'; Unierzyski (yellow card) 40'; Lázok (yellow card) 41'; A. Tóth (yellow card) 56'; Divić 59'; B. Tóth (yellow card) 83'	Report	Cseri (red card) 30'; Erős (yellow card) 42'; Kapcsos (yellow card) 50'; Torma 62'	Stadium: Stadion Rudolf Illovszky; Attendance: 2,000; Referee: Zsolt Szabó

8 March 2008 18	Rákospalota	2–2	Nyíregyháza	Sopron
16:00 CEST (UTC+2)	Nyerges 59'; Rása (yellow card) 60'; Torma 61'	Report	Ramos (yellow card) 58'; B. Kovács 82'; Dosso 86'; Perenyi (yellow card) 90+1'	Stadium: Káposztás utcai Stadion; Attendance: 1,300; Referee: Krisztián Pánczél

15 March 2008 19	Tatabánya	1–1	Rákospalota	Budapest
16:00 CEST (UTC+2)	Szilágyi (red card) 6'; Megyesi (yellow card) 22'; Vámosi (yellow card) 35'; Béres 58', (yellow card) 58'; Dienes (yellow card) 76'; Flores (yellow card) 78'; V. Farkas (yellow card) 84'	Report	Z. Varga 63'; Torma (yellow card) 65'; Kőhalmi (yellow card) 83'	Stadium: Szőnyi úti Stadion; Attendance: 150; Referee: Gergely Sulyok

24 March 2008 20	Rákospalota	2–2	Győr	Sopron
18:00 CEST (UTC+2)	Kapcsos (yellow card) 7'; Somorjai 26'; Torma 72'	Report	Jäkl (yellow card) 24'; Brnović 46'; Böőr 50'; Nikolov (yellow card) 86'	Stadium: Káposztás utcai Stadion; Attendance: 1,500; Referee: Ferenc Bede

29 March 2008 21	Rákospalota	3–0 (Awarded)	Sopron	Sopron
		Report		Stadium: Káposztás utcai Stadion

5 April 2008 22	Fehérvár	2–1	Rákospalota	Székesfehérvár
19:00 CEST (UTC+2)	Polonkai 13'; Koller (yellow card) 32'; Sitku 77'; Sifter (yellow card) 90+1'	Report	Nyerges 14'; Kapcsos (yellow card) 66'; Szántai (yellow card) 71'; Erős (yellow card) 73'	Stadium: Sóstói Stadion; Attendance: 1,571; Referee: Tamás Bognár

12 April 2008 23	Rákospalota	2–1	Paks	Sopron
19:00 CEST (UTC+2)	Torma (yellow card) 4'; Z. Varga 14', (yellow card) 90'; Erős (yellow card) 39'; Sallai (yellow card) 43'; Somorjai 47'; G. Horváth (yellow card) 76'	Report	T. Kiss 37', (yellow card) 43'; Tököli (yellow card) 53'; Z. Molnár (yellow card) 69'	Stadium: Káposztás utcai Stadion; Attendance: 700; Referee: Zsolt Szabó

19 April 2008 24	Újpest	4–4	Rákospalota	Budapest
20:00 CEST (UTC+2)	Somorjai 6' (o.g.); Tisza 28' (pen.), 31' (pen.); Sadjo (yellow card) 62'; Kéthévoama 90+3'	Report	Nyerges 7', 78'; G. Horváth 21'; Szántai (yellow card) 31'; Z. Varga 54'; Kapcsos (yellow card) 55'; Rása (yellow card) 82'	Stadium: Ferenc Szusza Stadium; Attendance: 4,541; Referee: Sándor Andó-Szabó

26 April 2008 25	Rákospalota	5–5	Diósgyőr	Sopron
19:00 CEST (UTC+2)	Dancs 36', 52'; Erős (yellow card) 40'; G. Horváth (yellow card) 52'; Kőhalmi (yellow card) 65'; Z. Varga 68'; Somorjai 76' (pen.), 81' (pen.)	Report	Köteles (yellow card) 22'; Simon 24', 50'; Pintér (yellow card) 40'; Honma 45', 77'; Kamber 70'; Hegedűs (yellow card) 75'	Stadium: Káposztás utcai Stadion; Attendance: 500; Referee: Mawla Hussain Al-Raeisi

3 May 2008 26	Debrecen	4–0	Rákospalota	Debrecen
19:00 CEST (UTC+2)	Czvitkovics 51'; Kerekes 56', 78'; Leandro 74'	Report	Erős (yellow card) 38'; G. Horváth (yellow card) 61'	Stadium: Stadion Oláh Gábor Út; Attendance: 6,000; Referee: Tamás Arany

10 May 2008 27	Rákospalota	4–2	Siófok	Sopron
19:00 CEST (UTC+2)	Somorjai 1'; Torma 45', 52', 64'; G. Horváth (yellow card) 55'; Zana (yellow card) 71'	Report	Melczer 48'; Magasföldi 76', (yellow card) 86'; László (yellow card) 85'	Stadium: Káposztás utcai Stadion; Attendance: 600; Referee: Péter Solymosi

17 May 2008 28	Zalaegerszeg	3–3	Rákospalota	Zalaegerszeg
19:00 CEST (UTC+2)	Zatara 75'; Kapcsos 77' (o.g.); Waltner 90+3', (yellow card) 90+3'	Report	Somorjai 27', 73'; B. Kovács 85'	Stadium: ZTE Arena; Attendance: 2,500; Referee: Tamás Bognár

26 May 2008 29	Rákospalota	0–3	MTK	Sopron
18:00 CEST (UTC+2)	Sallai (yellow card) 24'; Dancs (yellow card) 36'; Kapcsos (yellow card) 40'; Zana (yellow card) 76'	Report	Lambulić 48', 90'; J. Kanta (yellow card) 58'; Urbán 67'	Stadium: Káposztás utcai Stadion; Attendance: 2,000; Referee: Ferenc Bede

1 June 2008 30	Kaposvár	3–0	Rákospalota	Kaposvár
19:00 CEST (UTC+2)	Oláh 49', 58'; Nikolić 88'	Report	Kapcsos (yellow card) 80'	Stadium: Stadion Rákóczi; Attendance: 3,000; Referee: István Mészáros

=== Magyar Kupa ===
29 August 2007 Third round	Sárosd	2–8	Rákospalota	Sárosd
17:00 CEST (UTC+2)	Huber (yellow card) 20'; Z. Kovács 22', 50'; Kargl (yellow card) 30'; Nyikus (yellow card) 87'	Report	Torma x3, (yellow card) 44'; Madar x2; Nyerges x2; Polonkai	Stadium: Sárosdi Sportpálya; Attendance: 400; Referee: Csaba Pintér

25 September 2007 Round of 32	Kazincbarcika	2–1	Rákospalota	Kazincbarcika
15:00 CEST (UTC+2)	R. Kovács 22'; Stevica 28'; Botló (yellow card) 77'	Report	Erős (yellow card) 11'; T. Kiss (yellow card) 39', (goal) 49'; Polonkai (yellow card) 45'; Dinka (yellow card) 86'	Stadium: Pete András Stadion; Referee: István Vad

=== Ligakupa ===
==== Autumn season ====
===== Group stage =====
Pos	Team	Pld	W	D	L	GF	GA	GD	Pts	Qualification	ZAL	RAK	SIO	KAP
1	Zalaegerszeg	6	5	1	0	18	7	+11	16	Advance to knockout phase	—	3–1	4–0	1–1
2	Rákospalota	6	2	2	2	14	12	+2	8	Advance to knockout phase	3–5	—	2–0	5–1
3	Siófok	6	2	1	3	9	12	−3	7		2–3	1–1	—	4–1
4	Kaposvár	6	0	2	4	6	16	−10	2		0–2	2–2	1–2	—

Source: HFF

15 September 2007 1	Siófok	1–1	Rákospalota	Siófok
19:00 CEST (UTC+2)	Homonyik 68'; Miklósvári (yellow card) 87'	Report	B. Kovács (yellow card) 24'; G. Horváth (yellow card) 51'; T. Kiss 89'	Stadium: Révész Street Stadium; Attendance: 1,000; Referee: Roland Veizer

22 August 2007 2	Rákospalota	5–1	Kaposvár	Budapest
16:00 CEST (UTC+2)	Délczeg 10'; Matondo (yellow card) 26'; Dinka 29'; Kőhalmi 31'; Rása (red card) 44'; T. Kiss 55'; G. Horváth 76'	Report	Suljic 22'; Tonkovic (yellow card) 29'; Milinte (yellow card) 31'; Mező (red card) 75'	Stadium: Budai II. László Stadion; Referee: Krisztián Pánczél

9 September 2007 3	Zalaegerszeg	3–1	Rákospalota	Zalaegerszeg
19:00 CEST (UTC+2)	Waltner 18'; Méyé 28'; N. Tóth 70', (yellow card) 73'	Report	Nyerges 33'; Pusztai (yellow card) 86'; Kapcsos (yellow card) 90+2'	Stadium: ZTE Arena; Referee: István Mészáros

19 September 2007 4	Rákospalota	3–5	Zalaegerszeg	Budapest
16:00 CEST (UTC+2)	Kőhalmi 14'; Matondo 18'; Délczeg 32'; T. Kiss (yellow card) 40'	Report	T. Fülöp (yellow card) 40', (goal) 60'; Diawara 47', 67', (yellow card) 58'; Máté 68' (pen.); Sági 88'	Stadium: Budai II. László Stadion; Attendance: 250; Referee: Sándor Andó-Szabó

3 October 2007 5	Rákospalota	2–0	Siófok	Budapest
15:00 CEST (UTC+2)	T. Nagy 13', (yellow card) 45'; Rása (yellow card) 43'; Matondo 46', (yellow card) 46'	Report	Köntös (yellow card) 55'; Csopaki (yellow card) 78'; Miklósvári (yellow card) 90'	Stadium: Budai II. László Stadion; Attendance: 100; Referee: Ferenc Bede

10 October 2007 6	Kaposvár	2–2	Rákospalota	Kaposvár
18:00 CEST (UTC+2)	da Silva (yellow card) 39'; Z. Farkas 43'; Reszli 64'; R. Horváth (yellow card) 66'	Report	Matondo 19'; Pusztai (yellow card) 42'; T. Kiss 70'; B. Kovács (yellow card) 73'	Stadium: Stadion Rákóczi; Attendance: 200; Referee: Tamás Bognár

===== Knockout phase =====
Quarter-finals

17 October 2007 First leg	Rákospalota	0–2	Zalaegerszeg	Budapest
14:30 CEST (UTC+2)	B. Kovács (yellow card) 19'; Kapcsos (yellow card) 37'; Pusztai (yellow card) 54'	Report	Vulin (yellow card) 27'; Pekič 28'; Botiș (yellow card) 37', (goal) 71'; Polgár (yellow card) 53'	Stadium: Budai II. László Stadion; Attendance: 200; Referee: Roland Veizer

27 October 2007 Second leg	Zalaegerszeg	3–0 (5–0 agg.)	Rákospalota	Zalaegerszeg
16:00 CEST (UTC+2)	Balázs 14', 72'; Lukács 53'; Dudić (yellow card) 56'; Polgár (yellow card) 82'	Report	Erős (yellow card) 73'; Pusztai (red card) 75'; T. Kiss (yellow card) 87'	Stadium: ZTE Arena; Attendance: 800; Referee: Krisztián Király
Note: Zalaegerszeg won 5–0 on aggregate.

==== Spring season ====
===== Group stage =====
Pos	Team	Pld	W	D	L	GF	GA	GD	Pts	Qualification	DEB	RAK	HON	NYI
1	Debrecen	6	4	1	1	10	8	+2	13	Advance to knockout phase	—	3–2	2–1	2–1
2	Rákospalota (Note: Rákospalota was deducted 1 points)	6	3	1	2	9	10	−1	9	Advance to knockout phase	3–1	—	1–1	2–0
3	Budapest Honvéd	6	2	2	2	13	8	+5	8		1–2	5–0	—	4–2
4	Nyíregyháza	6	0	2	4	4	10	−6	2		0–0	0–1	1–1	—

Source: HFF
Notes:

30 November 2007 1	Rákospalota	3–1	Debrecen	Budapest
13:00 CEST (UTC+2)	Torma 33', 42'; Kapcsos 49'	Report	Czvitkovics 50'	Stadium: Budai II. László Stadion; Attendance: 100; Referee: József Berger

5 December 2007 2	Rákospalota	1–1	Honvéd	Budapest
13:00 CEST (UTC+2)	Erős (yellow card) 42'; Z. Varga (yellow card) 68'; Kapcsos 72'	Report	Hercegfalvi 65'	Stadium: Budai II. László Stadion; Attendance: 400; Referee: István Vad

8 December 2007 3	Rákospalota	2–0	Nyíregyháza	Budapest
13:00 CEST (UTC+2)	Z. Varga 12'; G. Horváth (yellow card) 19'; Torma 45'	Report	Jeddi (yellow card) 90+2'	Stadium: Budai II. László Stadion; Attendance: 150; Referee: Ferenc Bede

16 February 2008 4	Nyíregyháza	0–1	Rákospalota	Nyíregyháza
14:00 CEST (UTC+2)		Report	Erős (yellow card) 33'; Cseri (yellow card) 55'; Nyerges 57'	Stadium: Városi Stadion; Attendance: 400; Referee: Zoltán Iványi

20 February 2008 5	Debrecen	3–2	Rákospalota	Debrecen
14:00 CEST (UTC+2)	R. Nagy 22'; Rudolf 47', 71'; Fodor (yellow card) 55'; Szűcs (yellow card) 73'; Poleksić (yellow card) 90'	Report	Nyerges 32', 73'; Z. Varga (yellow card) 78'; G. Horváth (yellow card) 82'	Stadium: Stadion Oláh Gábor Út; Attendance: 1,000; Referee: Attila Hegedűs

27 February 2008 6	Honvéd	5–0	Rákospalota	Budapest
18:00 CEST (UTC+2)	Veledar 26' (pen.), 48' (pen.); Koós 83', 85', 90+1'	Report	T. Kiss (yellow card) 23'; G. Horváth (yellow card) 48'; Dinka (yellow card) 89'	Stadium: Bozsik József Stadion; Attendance: 1,200; Referee: Tibor Gyarmati II

===== Knockout phase =====
Quarter-finals

5 March 2008 First leg	Rákospalota	0–4	MTK	Budapest
14:30 CEST (UTC+2)	Erős (yellow card) 24'	Report	Gosztonyi 13'; M. Molnár 16'; Kecskés 62' (pen.); Vadnai 77'	Stadium: Budai II. László Stadion; Attendance: 100; Referee: István Mészáros

12 March 2008 Second leg	MTK	6–0 (10–0 agg.)	Rákospalota	Budapest
17:00 CEST (UTC+2)	Lencse 6', 54'; Kecskés 44' (pen.); Gosztonyi 51'; L. Horváth 55'; Boda 81'	Report	Rása (yellow card) 43'; Baghy (yellow card) 90'	Stadium: Hidegkuti Nándor Stadion; Attendance: 100; Referee: Ádám Németh
Note: MTK won 10–0 on aggregate.

== Statistics ==
=== Overall ===
Appearances (Apps) numbers are for appearances in competitive games only, including sub appearances.
Source: Competitions

No.	Player	Pos.	Nemzeti Bajnokság I				Magyar Kupa				Ligakupa				Total			
No.	Player	Pos.	Apps	Goal	Booked	Sent off (straight red)	Apps	Goal	Booked	Sent off (straight red)	Apps	Goal	Booked	Sent off (straight red)	Apps	Goal	Booked	Sent off (straight red)
1	(Hungary) Balázs Farkas	GK	7								5				12			
1	(Hungary) Dániel Botlik	GK																
1	(Hungary) Mátyás Esterházy	GK	1								3				4			
1	(Hungary) Dániel Schön	GK																
2	(Hungary) Balázs Dinka	DF	21		1		1		1		9	1	1		31	1	3	
3	(Hungary) Aladár Virág	MF	11								7				18			
4	(Hungary) Tamás Nagy	FW	10		1						6	1	1		16	1	2	
5	(Hungary) Balázs Sallai	DF	28		3		1				7				36		3	
6	(Hungary) András Kőhalmi	MF	22	1	3		1				7	2			30	3	3	
7	(Hungary) Gergő Cseri	MF	27		2	1	1				8		1		36		3	1
8	(Hungary) Vince Kapcsos	DF	26	1	8	1	1				10	2	2		37	3	10	1
9	(Hungary) Zoltán Varga	MF	19	4	2		1				9	1	2		29	5	4	
10	(Hungary) Gábor Torma	FW	26	11	3	1	1	3	1		6	3			33	17	4	1
11	(Hungary) Krisztián Nyerges	FW	24	8			1	2			5	4			30	14		
12	(Hungary) Levente Szántai	GK	21		2		1				8				30		2	
13	(Hungary) Tamás Kiss	MF	5					1	1		12	3	3		17	4	4	
14	(Hungary) Balázs Kovács	MF	9	1	1		1				13		3		23	1	4	
15	(Hungary) Tibor Virágh	DF					1				1				2			
15	(Hungary) Kristóf Schlafer										1				1			
15	(Hungary) Roland Dancs	MF	14	2	1						2				16	2	1	
16	(Hungary) Tamás Floszmann	GK									1				1			
17	(Hungary) Gábor Horváth	DF	26	1	10		1				12	1	4		39	2	14	
18	(Hungary) Gergely Délczeg	FW									9	2			9	2		
19	(Hungary) Franck Matondo	FW	1								7	3	2		8	3	2	
21	(Hungary) Csaba Madar	MF	13	1	1		1	2			9				23	3	1	
21	(Hungary) András Selei	MF	6								5				11			
22	(Hungary) Attila Polonkai	MF	14	1	3		1	1	1		2				17	2	4	
22	(Hungary) Tamás Somorjai	MF	13	7							3				16	7		
23	(Hungary) Gergő Rása	MF	14		4						11		2	1	25		6	1
24	(Hungary) Norbert Zana	MF	6		2						3				9		2	
24	(Hungary) Péter Kocsis	FW									3				3			
26	(Hungary) Tamás Gasparik	DF	2								9				11			
27	(Hungary) Dániel Nagy	MF									5				5			
28	(Hungary) Ferenc Baghy										4		1		4		1	
29	(Hungary) Károly Erős	MF	26		10				1		8		4		34		15	
30	(Hungary) Olivér Pusztai	DF	5	1	1						6		3	1	11	1	4	1
Own goals																		
Totals				39	58	3		9	5			23	29	2		71	92	5

=== Hat-tricks ===
No.	Player	Against	Result	Date	Competition	Round
10	(Hungary) Gábor Torma	Sárosd	8–2 (A)	29 August 2007	Magyar Kupa	Third round
10	(Hungary) Gábor Torma	Siófok	4–2 (H)	10 May 2008	Nemzeti Bajnokság I	27

=== Clean sheets ===
			Clean sheets			
No.	Player	Games Played	Nemzeti Bajnokság I	Magyar Kupa	Ligakupa	Total
12	(Hungary) Levente Szántai	30	2	0	2	4
1	(Hungary) Balázs Farkas	12	1		1	2
16	(Hungary) Tamás Floszmann	1			1	1
1	(Hungary) Mátyás Esterházy	4	0		0	0
1	(Hungary) Dániel Botlik	0				0
1	(Hungary) Dániel Schön	0				0
Totals			3	0	4	7
