= Máté Gulyás =

Hungarian footballer (born 1988)

Personal information
- Date of birth: 27 June 1988 (age 38)
- Place of birth: Vác, Hungary
- Height: 1.80 m (5 ft 11 in)
- Position: Midfielder

Youth career
- Vác
- Újpest

Senior career*
Years	Team	Apps	(Gls)
2005–2009	Újpest	18	(2)
2007–2008	→ Pécs (loan)	21	(0)
2009	→ BKV Előre (loan)	8	(2)
2009–2010	Pécs	2	(0)
2010	→ Vecsés (loan)	13	(1)
2010–2012	Rákospalota	49	(4)
2012–2013	Dunakanyar-Vác	16	(1)
2013	Balmazújváros	3	(0)
2013–2014	Vác	28	(4)
2014–2015	Kitzbühel	16	(2)
2015	Veresegyház	13	(2)
2015–2016	Szigetszentmiklós	25	(1)
2016–2018	Vác	66	(5)
2018–2020	Nyíregyháza	33	(0)
2020	BVSC-Zugló	2	(0)
2020–2021	Taksony	20	(1)
2021–2022	Dunaharaszti	28	(2)
2022	Dabas–Gyón	16	(0)
2022–2023	Rákospalota	26	(1)
2023–2024	Szokolya	12	(3)
Total		415	(29)

International career
2002	Hungary U15	2	(0)
2006	Hungary U20	1	(0)
- * Club domestic league appearances and goals

Máté Gulyás (born 27 June 1988) is a Hungarian former professional footballer, who played as a midfielder. He represented Hungary at youth level.

== Career ==
Gulyás, emerging from the club's youth ranks, signed his first professional contract with Újpest in the Nemzeti Bajnokság I during the 2005 summer transfer window. On 17 November 2005, Gulyás and Attila Hullám, two young players of Újpest, were given a significant opportunity by spending nearly one week training with Dutch club Feyenoord as part of a cooperation agreement between the two clubs.

He committed a dangerous tackle in the 94th minute of an Nemzeti Bajnokság II match against Győr, causing a serious knee injury to Viktor Symcho, including cruciate and collateral ligament damage. On 19 September 2019, the Hungarian Football Federation suspended Gulyás for three months due to the injury-causing foul. Following an internal investigation after the incident, Nyíregyháza terminated his contract on 24 September 2019.

== Career statistics ==
=== Club ===
Appearances and goals by club, season and competition
Club	Season	League			National cup (Note: Includes Magyar Kupa, Austrian Cup)		League cup (Note: Includes Ligakupa)		Other		Total	
Club	Season	Division	Apps	Goals	Apps	Goals	Apps	Goals	Apps	Goals	Apps	Goals
Újpest	2005–06	Nemzeti Bajnokság I	9	0	2	0	—		—		11	0
Újpest	2006–07	Nemzeti Bajnokság I	9	0	2	0	—		—		11	0
Újpest	Total		18	0	4	0	—		—		22	0
Pécs (loan)	2007–08	Nemzeti Bajnokság II	19	0	1	0	—		—		20	0
Pécs (loan)	2008–09	Nemzeti Bajnokság II	2	0	2	0	5	0	—		9	0
Pécs (loan)	Total		21	0	3	0	5	0	—		29	0
BKV Előre (loan)	2008–09	Nemzeti Bajnokság II	8	2	—		—		—		8	2
Pécs	2009–10	Nemzeti Bajnokság II	2	0	2	0	—		—		4	0
Vecsés (loan)	2009–10	Nemzeti Bajnokság II	13	1	—		—		—		13	1
Rákospalota	2010–11	Nemzeti Bajnokság II	27	3	2	0	—		—		29	3
Rákospalota	2011–12	Nemzeti Bajnokság II	22	1	2	1	—		—		24	2
Rákospalota	Total		49	4	4	1	—		—		53	5
Dunakanyar-Vác	2012–13	Nemzeti Bajnokság II	16	1	—		—		—		16	1
Balmazújváros	2012–13	Nemzeti Bajnokság II	3	0	—		—		—		3	0
Vác	2013–14	Megyei Bajnokság I	28	4	—		—		8 (Note: Six appearances and two goals in Pest Megyei Kupa, two appearances in Megyei Bajnokság I promotion play-offs)	2	36	6
Kitzbühel	2014–15	Austrian Regionalliga West	16	2	1	0	—		1 (Note: Appearance in Tirol-Cup)	0	18	2
Veresegyház	2014–15	Nemzeti Bajnokság III	13	2	—		—		—		13	2
Szigetszentmiklós	2015–16	Nemzeti Bajnokság II	25	1	1	0	—		—		26	1
Vác	2016–17	Nemzeti Bajnokság II	32	1	1	0	—		—		33	1
Vác	2017–18	Nemzeti Bajnokság II	34	4	4	0	—		—		38	4
Vác	Total		66	5	5	0	—		—		71	5
Nyíregyháza	2018–19	Nemzeti Bajnokság II	26	0	1	1	—		—		27	1
Nyíregyháza	2019–20	Nemzeti Bajnokság II	7	0	—		—		—		7	0
Nyíregyháza	Total		33	0	1	1	—		—		34	1
BVSC-Zugló	2019–20	Megyei Bajnokság I	2	0	—		—		—		2	0
Taksony	2020–21	Nemzeti Bajnokság III	20	1	2	0	—		—		22	1
Dunaharaszti	2020–21	Megyei Bajnokság I	16	2	—		—		—		16	2
Dunaharaszti	2021–22	Megyei Bajnokság I	12	0	—		—		—		12	0
Dunaharaszti	Total		28	2	—		—		—		28	2
Dabas–Gyón	2021–22	Nemzeti Bajnokság III	16	0	—		—		—		16	0
Rákospalota	2022–23	Megyei Bajnokság I	26	1	2	1	—		3 (Note: One appearance in Budapest Kupa, two appearances in Megyei Bajnokság I promotion play-offs)	0	31	2
Szokolya	2023–24	Megyei Bajnokság III	12	3	—		—		—		12	3
Career total			415	29	25	3	5	0	12	2	457	34

=== International ===
Appearances and goals by national team and year
Team	Year	Total	
Team	Year	Apps	Goals
Hungary U15	2002	2	0
Hungary U20	2006	1	0
Career total		3	0

== Honours ==
Pécs

- Ligakupa runner-up: 2008–09

Vác

- Megyei Bajnokság I – Pest: 2013–14
- Pest Megyei Kupa: 2013–14
