= Vituska =

Vituska or Vituška is a surname. Notable people with the surname include:

- István Vituska (born 1988), Hungarian footballer
- Michał Vituška (1907–2006), Belarusian politician and Nazi collaborator
