= András Kőhalmi =

Hungarian footballer (born 1981)

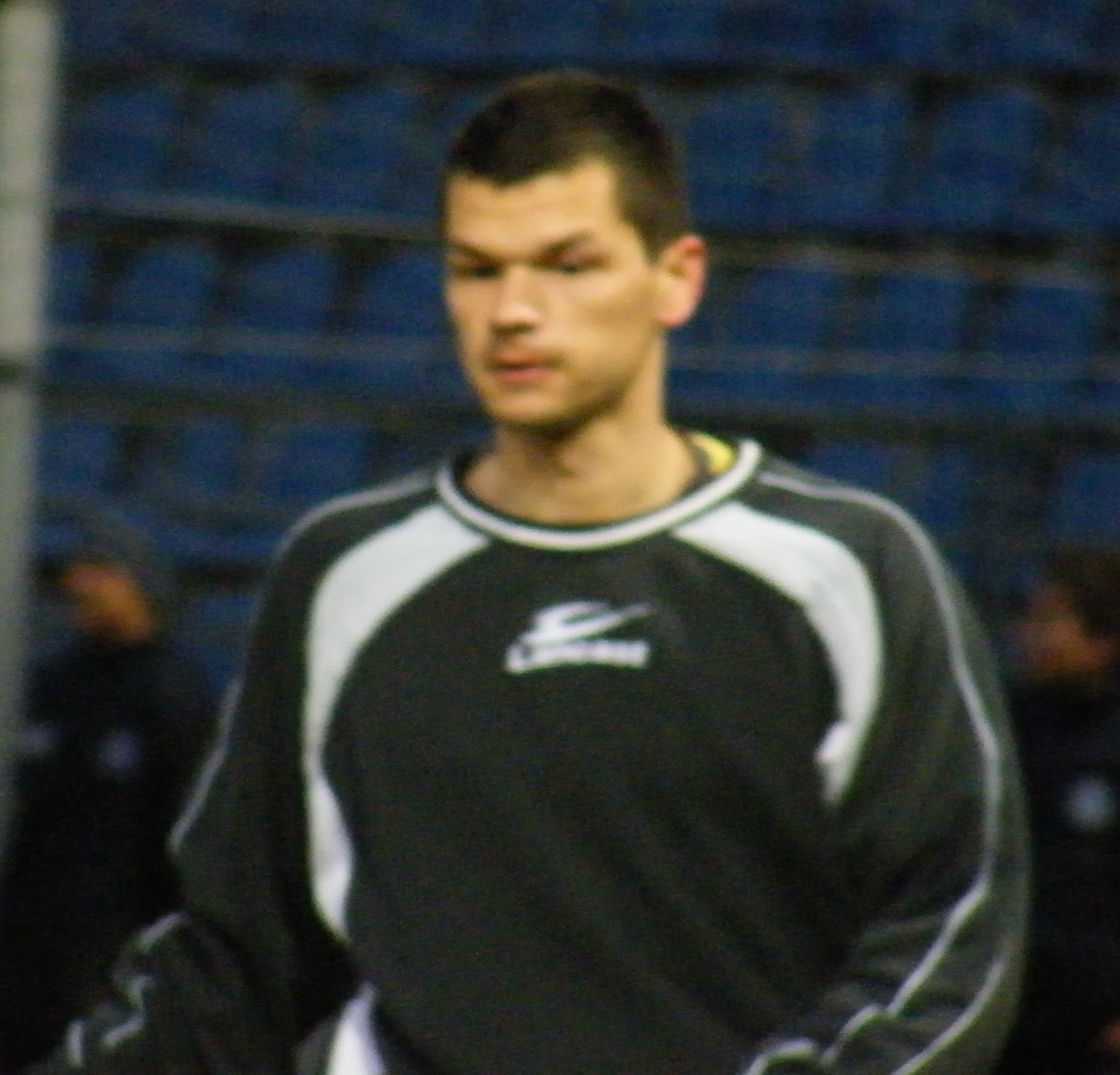
- Kőhalmi in 2009

Personal information
- Date of birth: 17 August 1981 (age 45)
- Place of birth: Budapest, Hungary
- Height: 1.80 m (5 ft 11 in)
- Position: Midfielder

Youth career
- Újpest
- Ferencváros
- Újpest

Senior career*
| Years | Team | Apps | (Gls) |
| 2000–2002 | Újpest | 5 | (0) |
| 2001 | → Monor (loan) | 3 | (0) |
| 2002–2004 | Rákospalota | 57 | (14) |
| 2004–2007 | Újpest | 52 | (2) |
| 2007–2009 | Rákospalota | 44 | (1) |
| Total | | 161 | (17) |
- * Club domestic league appearances and goals

András Kőhalmi (born 17 August 1981) is a Hungarian former professional footballer who played as a midfielder.

== Career ==
On 17 November 2000, Kőhalmi debuted for Újpest in a 2–1 home win against Sopron in Nemzeti Bajnokság I.

Kőhalmi scored his first professional goal on 10 November 2002, while playing for Rákospalota in Nemzeti Bajnokság II against BKV Előre, scoring in the 72nd minute shortly after his substitution.

In the decisive league match on 3 June 2006, which determined the Hungarian league title, he was a member of Újpest and was substituted onto the field in the 87th minute, replacing Krisztián Vermes, during the team's 3–1 defeat against Fehérvár, as Újpest ultimately failed to win the championship.

== Career statistics ==
Appearances and goals by club, season and competition
| Club | Season | League | | | Magyar Kupa | | Ligakupa | | Europe | | Other | | Total | |
| Club | Season | Division | Apps | Goals | Apps | Goals | Apps | Goals | Apps | Goals | Apps | Goals | Apps | Goals |
|---|---|---|---|---|---|---|---|---|---|---|---|---|---|---|
| Újpest | 2000–01 | Nemzeti Bajnokság I | 5 | 0 | — | | — | | — | | — | | 5 | 0 |
| Újpest | 2001–02 | Nemzeti Bajnokság I | 0 | 0 | — | | — | | — | | — | | 0 | 0 |
| Újpest | Total | | 5 | 0 | — | | — | | — | | — | | 5 | 0 |
| Monor (loan) | 2001–02 | Nemzeti Bajnokság II | 3 | 0 | — | | — | | — | | — | | 3 | 0 |
| Rákospalota | 2002–03 | Nemzeti Bajnokság II | 24 | 1 | 1 | 0 | — | | — | | — | | 25 | 1 |
| Rákospalota | 2003–04 | Nemzeti Bajnokság II | 33 | 13 | 1 | 0 | — | | — | | 2 (Note: Appearances in Nemzeti Bajnokság I promotion play-offs) | 0 | 36 | 13 |
| Rákospalota | Total | | 57 | 14 | 2 | 0 | — | | — | | 2 | 0 | 61 | 14 |
| Újpest | 2004–05 | Nemzeti Bajnokság I | 16 | 0 | 1 | 0 | — | | 2 (Note: Appearances in UEFA Cup) | 0 | — | | 19 | 0 |
| Újpest | 2005–06 | Nemzeti Bajnokság I | 20 | 1 | 3 | 3 | — | | — | | — | | 23 | 4 |
| Újpest | 2006–07 | Nemzeti Bajnokság I | 16 | 1 | 4 | 0 | — | | 2 | 0 | — | | 22 | 1 |
| Újpest | Total | | 52 | 2 | 8 | 3 | — | | 4 | 0 | — | | 64 | 5 |
| Rákospalota | 2007–08 | Nemzeti Bajnokság I | 22 | 1 | 2 | 0 | 7 | 2 | — | | — | | 31 | 3 |
| Rákospalota | 2008–09 | Nemzeti Bajnokság I | 22 | 0 | 4 | 1 | 7 | 0 | — | | — | | 33 | 1 |
| Rákospalota | Total | | 44 | 1 | 6 | 1 | 14 | 2 | — | | — | | 64 | 4 |
| Career total | | | 161 | 17 | 16 | 4 | 14 | 2 | 4 | 0 | 2 | 0 | 197 | 23 |
