= Gergely Fűzfa =

Hungarian footballer

Fűzfa Gergely
Personal information
- Full name: Fűzfa Gergely
- Date of birth: 18 July 1988 (age 38)
- Place of birth: Budapest, Hungary
- Height: 1.86 m (6 ft 1 in)
- Position: Midfielder

Senior career*
Years	Team	Apps	(Gls)
2007–2008	Budafoki LC	18	(0)
2008–2010	Újpest FC II	50	(5)
2010–2011	Lombard-Pápa TFC	3	(0)
2011–2013	DSV Leoben	26	(1)
2013–2014	Vorwärts Steyr		
2014–2017	DSV Leoben		
2017–2018	Kecskeméti TE		
2018–2019	SC Liezen		
Total		97	(6)
- * Club domestic league appearances and goals

Gergely Fűzfa (born 18 July 1988 in Budapest) is a Hungarian retired footballer.
