= Ádám Kisznyér =

Hungarian footballer

Personal information
- Date of birth: 10 February 1988 (age 38)
- Place of birth: Dósza, Hungary
- Height: 1.81 m (5 ft 11 in)
- Position: Striker

Team information
- Current team: Újpest FC
- Number: 35

Youth career
- Újpest FC
- Vasas SC
- MTK Budapest

Senior career*
Years	Team	Apps	(Gls)
2007–	Újpest FC	6	(0)
- * Club domestic league appearances and goals as of 19 March 2008

Ádám Kisznyér (born 10 February 1988) is a Hungarian footballer who played as a striker for Újpest FC until March 2009. He retired due to a serious head injury.

== Career ==
Kisznyér started to play football at the age of seven at Újpest. He stayed in the youth team, then went to Vasas SC for a half-year, later that he joined MTK. He played in MTK between 2001 and 2004. His first NB I match with the team was against Bp. Honvéd in February 2007.
