= Diren Akdemir =

Swiss-Turkish football defender (born 1985)

Personal information
- Date of birth: 4 February 1985 (age 41)
- Place of birth: Basel, Switzerland
- Height: 1.82 m (6 ft 0 in)
- Position: Defender

Team information
- Current team: FC Vaduz
- Number: 19

Youth career
- 2003–2005: FC Basel

Senior career*
Years	Team	Apps	(Gls)
2005–2010	FC Vaduz	50	(5)
2009–2010	→ FC Wil 1900 (loan)	26	(2)
2010–	BSC Old Boys	115	(7)
- * Club domestic league appearances and goals as of 5 January 2008

Diren Akdemir (born 4 February 1985) is a Turkish-Swiss football defender who plays for FC Vaduz in the Swiss Super League.

== Career ==
He played at youth level for FC Basel and in 2005 joined FC Vaduz.

He has played for Vaduz in the UEFA Cup.
