= Christian Wieczorek =

German footballer

Personal information
- Date of birth: December 9, 1985 (age 40)
- Place of birth: Bielefeld, Germany
- Height: 1.82 m (6 ft 0 in)
- Position: Midfielder

Youth career
- –1999: VfL Schildesche
- 1999–2004: Arminia Bielefeld

Senior career*
Years	Team	Apps	(Gls)
2004–2006	Arminia Bielefeld II	26	(2)
2006–2008	FC Vaduz	48	(4)
- * Club domestic league appearances and goals as of 23 August 2008

Christian Wieczorek (born December 9, 1985) is a German retired footballer who played as a midfielder for FC Vaduz in the Swiss Super League.

== Club career ==
Wieczorek started his career at VfL Schildesche. In 1999, he joined Arminia Bielefeld's youth team. After 6 years, he left Arminia Bielefeld and moved to FC Vaduz and played 48 games, scoring 4 goals. In December 2008 his career finished, following injury (a cranial fracture the previous April).

== Managerial career ==
Wieczorek will begin to work as Head Coach in Bielefeld.
