= György Sándor (footballer) =

Hungarian footballer (born 1984)

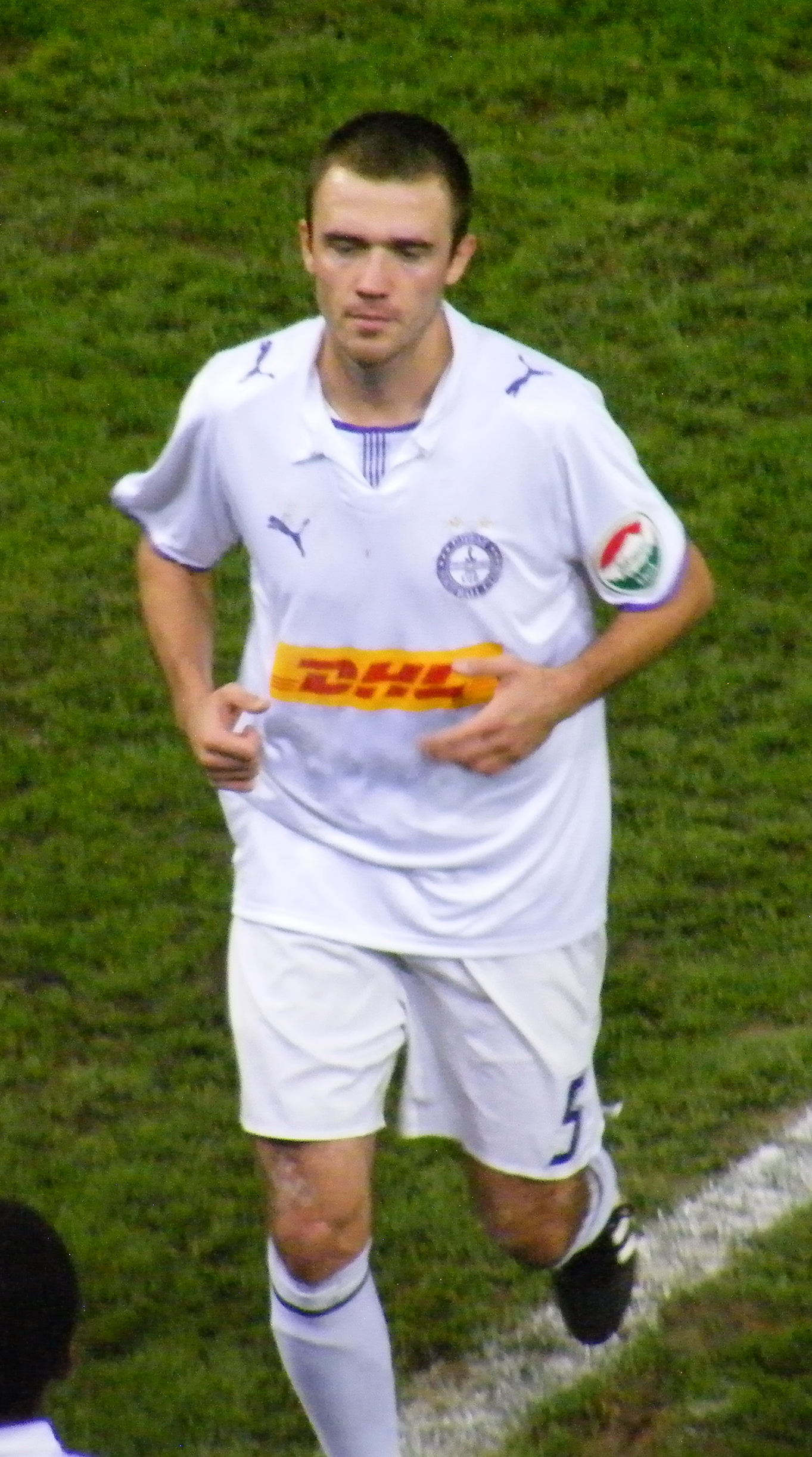
- Sándor playing for Újpest in 2008

Personal information
- Full name: György Sándor
- Date of birth: 20 March 1984 (age 42)
- Place of birth: Uzhhorod, Ukrainian SSR, Soviet Union
- Height: 1.83 m (6 ft 0 in)
- Position: Midfielder

Senior career*
Years	Team	Apps	(Gls)
2003–2004	Újpest	7	(2)
2004–2005	Győri ETO	23	(2)
2005–2009	Újpest	105	(12)
2008	→ Plymouth Argyle (loan)	0	(0)
2009	→ Litex Lovech (loan)	12	(1)
2009–2015	Videoton	136	(16)
2013	→ Al-Ittihad (loan)	10	(1)
2015–2016	Perth Glory	24	(4)
2016–2017	Puskás Akadémia	34	(4)
2017–2019	Csákvári TK	61	(12)

International career
2006-2014	Hungary	9	(0)
2018-	Kárpátalja	6	(2)

Managerial career
- 2019–: Hungary U21 (assistant manager)
Medal record
Men's football
ConIFA World Football Cup
Winner	2018 Barawa
- * Club domestic league appearances and goals as of 1 July 2019

György Sándor (born 20 March 1984) is a Hungarian footballer who plays for Csákvári TK as a midfielder. He was born in Carpathian Ruthenia to an ethnic Hungarian family.

== Career ==
Sándor started his professional career in Újpest FC. In season 2004-05 he played in Győri ETO FC. In June 2005 György returned to Újpest FC. For three seasons he earned 71 appearances, scored nine goals.

On 15 November 2006 Sándor made his debut for Hungary national football team in a friendly match against Canada. In February 2007 he played for the team in matches against Cyprus and Latvia.

Amidst rumours circulating over Sándor's fitness after a recent ankle injury, the midfielder completed a loan deal taking him to Plymouth Argyle until the end of the season, with a view to make the move permanent, on 24 January 2008 . On 23 April, Sándor returned from the loan to Újpest FC.

In January 2009, Sándor was loaned by Bulgarian Litex Lovech. Sándor was given the number 24 shirt. He made his team debut a few days later in Dubai, in an 0-0 friendly draw against FC Bunyodkor. Sándor scored his first goal in the league against PFC Lokomotiv Mezdra. In January 2013 he joined Ittihad FC .

On 16 July 2015 Sándor signed a two-year deal with Perth Glory. At the end of the season, on 8 May 2016, he was released by the club and returned to Hungary due to family reasons.

== Honours ==
Litex Lovech

- Bulgarian Cup: 2009

Videoton

- Nemzeti Bajnokság I: 2010–11

Ittihad FC

- King Cup of Champions: 2012–13

Karpatalja

- ConIFA World Football Cup: 2018

== Career statistics ==
As of 26 October 2014

Appearances and goals by club, season and competition
Club	Season	League			Cup		League Cup		Europe		Total	
Club	Season	Division	Apps	Goals	Apps	Goals	Apps	Goals	Apps	Goals	Apps	Goals
Újpest	2003–04	Nemzeti Bajnokság I	7	2	0	0	0	0	0	0	7	2
Újpest	2005–06	Nemzeti Bajnokság I	29	3	0	0	0	0	0	0	29	3
Újpest	2006–07	Nemzeti Bajnokság I	27	3	3	0	0	0	0	0	30	3
Újpest	2007–08	Nemzeti Bajnokság I	20	5	0	0	5	2	0	0	25	7
Újpest	2008–09	Nemzeti Bajnokság I	15	0	2	0	1	0	0	0	18	0
Újpest	2009–10	Nemzeti Bajnokság I	14	1	3	2	2	1	2	0	21	4
Újpest	Total		112	14	8	2	8	3	2	0	130	19
Győr	2004–05	Nemzeti Bajnokság I	23	2	0	0	0	0	0	0	23	2
Litex Lovech	2008–09	A PFG	12	1	0	0	0	0	0	0	12	1
Videoton	2009–10	Nemzeti Bajnokság I	15	3	0	0	0	0	0	0	15	3
Videoton	2010–11	Nemzeti Bajnokság I	29	3	6	1	2	0	2	0	39	4
Videoton	2011–12	Nemzeti Bajnokság I	28	7	6	2	4	1	2	1	40	11
Videoton	2012–13	Nemzeti Bajnokság I	11	1	1	0	2	0	12	1	26	2
Videoton	2013–14	Nemzeti Bajnokság I	27	1	3	0	5	0	0	0	35	1
Videoton	2014–15	Nemzeti Bajnokság I	26	1	0	0	2	0	0	0	14	1
Videoton	Total		136	16	16	3	15	1	16	2	169	22
Career total			283	33	24	5	21	4	18	2	334	44
