= Zoltán Kovács (footballer, born 1973) =

Hungarian footballer

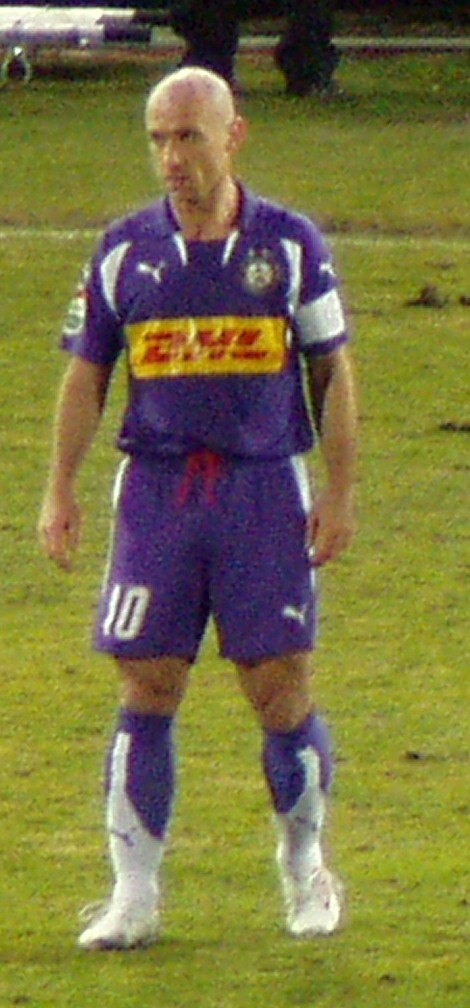

Personal information
- Date of birth: 24 September 1973 (age 53)
- Place of birth: Budapest, Hungary
- Height: 1.79 m (5 ft 10 in)
- Position: Striker

Youth career
- Nagytétényi Kohász, MTK

Senior career*
Years	Team	Apps	(Gls)
1992–1994	MTK Hungária FC	28	(6)
1994–1995	BVSC Budapest	33	(5)
1996	Pécsi MFC	11	(5)
1996–1998	Újpest FC	49	(24)
1998	PAOK FC	12	(5)
1998–2000	Újpest FC	59	(21)
2000–2002	LB Châteauroux	62	(14)
2002–2004	Újpest FC	44	(23)
2004	Shenzhen Jianlibao	10	(3)
2004–2008	Újpest FC	97	(32)
2008	Győri ETO FC	14	(4)
	Career Total	428	(145)

International career
1997–2005	Hungary	20	(2)
- * Club domestic league appearances and goals

Zoltán Kovács (born 24 September 1973) is a retired Hungarian footballer who used to play as a striker. Kovács was the captain, and fan's favourite for Újpest. In 2008 Christmas Kovács retired from the professional football, although he continues his career in his youth club, Nagytétény, at the amateur level (fourth tier).

== International goals ==
#	Date	Venue	Opponent	Score	Result	Competition
1	8 June 1997	Budapest, Hungary	Norway	1–1	Draw	FIFA World Cup 1998 Qual.
2	6 August 1997	Siófok, Hungary	Malta	3–0	Win	Friendly

== Personal life ==
He is the father of footballer Patrik Kovács.

== Honours ==
- Nemzeti Bajnokság I Runners-up: 1997, 2006
- Nemzeti Bajnokság I Third place: 1999
- Chinese Super League Champions: 2004
- CSL Cup Runner-up: 2004
