= Károly Erős =

Hungarian footballer

Personal information
- Full name: Károly Erős
- Date of birth: 20 December 1971 (age 54)
- Place of birth: Pilisvörösvár, Hungary
- Height: 1.78 m (5 ft 10 in)
- Position: Midfielder

Team information
- Current team: Monor (Player-Manager)
- Number: 20

Senior career*
Years	Team	Apps	(Gls)
1992–1994	Vasas SC	40	(1)
1995–1996	BKV Előre	?	
1996–1998	BVSC Budapest	64	(11)
1998–2001	MTK Hungaria FC	85	(8)
2001–2002	Ujpest FC	33	(5)
2002	BFC Siófok	15	(0)
2003	Budapest Honvéd FC	13	(0)
2003–2007	Ujpest FC	108	(5)
2007–2009	REAC	44	(0)

International career
2000–2001	Hungary	2	(0)
- * Club domestic league appearances and goals

Károly Erős (born 20 December 1971 in Pilisvörösvár) is a Hungarian football player who currently plays for and manages NB III team, Monor.
