= Attila Böjte =

Hungarian footballer

Personal information
- Full name: Attila Böjte
- Date of birth: 2 September 1976 (age 50)
- Place of birth: Győr, Hungary
- Height: 1.77 m (5 ft 10 in)
- Position: Defender

Team information
- Current team: Gyirmót SE
- Number: 24

Youth career
- –1995: Győri ETO FC
- Integrál-DAC
- Győri ETO FC

Senior career*
Years	Team	Apps	(Gls)
1995–99	Győri ETO FC	22	(0)
1998	Soproni FAC	8	(0)
1999	MTE-Motim	7	(0)
1999–04	Győri ETO FC	135	(0)
2005–2008	Újpest FC	83	(0)
2008–	Gyirmót SE	34	(1)

International career
2004–2005	Hungary	6	(0)
- * Club domestic league appearances and goals as of 25 January 2010

Attila Böjte (born 2 September 1976) is a Hungarian footballer who currently plays as a defender.
