= Norbert Tóth (footballer) =

Hungarian footballer

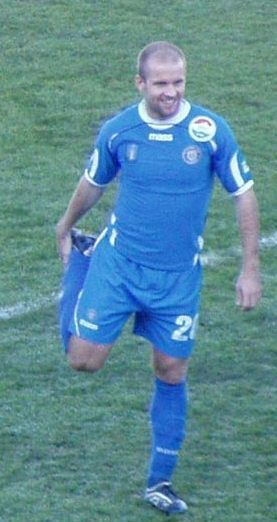
- Tóth in 2007

Personal information
- Full name: Norbert Tóth
- Date of birth: 11 August 1976 (age 50)
- Place of birth: Szombathely, Hungary
- Height: 1.76 m (5 ft 9 in)
- Position: Midfielder

Team information
- Current team: TJ OFC Gabčíkovo
- Number: 20

Senior career*
Years	Team	Apps	(Gls)
1992–1994	Szombathelyi Haladás	23	(2)
1994–1997	FC Fehérvár	85	(8)
1997–2000	Újpest FC	87	(21)
2000–2002	Vasas SC	68	(9)
2002–2003	FC Fehérvár	19	(6)
2003–2004	Panionios F.C.	7	(0)
2004–2007	Újpest FC	75	(25)
2007	Rákospalotai EAC	11	(1)
2007–2008	Zalaegerszegi TE	14	(2)
2008–2009	Szombathelyi Haladás	20	(2)
2009–2010	Újpest FC	22	(1)
2010–2011	Lombard-Pápa TFC	10	(0)
2011–2013	Törökbálint TC		
2013–	TJ OFC Gabčíkovo		

International career
1996–1997	Hungary U-21	9	(1)
1998–2005	Hungary	19	(1)
- * Club domestic league appearances and goals as of 20 November 2010

Norbert Tóth (born 11 August 1976) is a Hungarian football player who is currently playing for TJ OFC Gabčíkovo.

== Career statistics ==
=== International ===
Appearances and goals by national team and year
National team	Year	Apps	Goals
Hungary	1998	6	0
Hungary	1999	4	0
Hungary	2000	–	
Hungary	2001	2	0
Hungary	2002	3	1
Hungary	2003	1	0
Hungary	2004	–	
Hungary	2005	3	0
Total		19	1

Scores and results list Hungary's goal tally first, score column indicates score after each Tóth goal.

List of international goals scored by Norbert Tóth
No.	Date	Venue	Opponent	Score	Result	Competition
1	27 March 2002	Republican Stadium, Chișinău, Moldova	Moldova	2–0	2–0	Friendly

== Honours ==
Nemzeti Bajnokság I:
Winner: 1998
Magyar Kupa:
Runner-up: 1993, 1998
Hungarian Second Division:
Winner: 2008
