= István Vituska =

Hungarian footballer

Personal information
- Full name: István Vituska
- Date of birth: 25 August 1988 (age 38)
- Place of birth: Szekszárd, Hungary
- Height: 1.67 m (5 ft 5 1/2 in)
- Position: Midfielder

Team information
- Current team: Kozármisleny
- Number: 14

Youth career
- 2002–2003: Szekszárd
- 2003–2005: Újpest

Senior career*
| Years | Team | Apps | (Gls) |
| 2005–2008 | Újpest | 15 | (1) |
| 2007–2008 | → Pápa (loan) | 7 | (0) |
| 2008–2010 | Szekszárd | 35 | (11) |
| 2010 | Steinerkirchen | | |
| 2010–2011 | Vorchdorf | | |
| 2011–2013 | Sattledt | | |
| 2013 | Gunskirchen | | |
| 2013– | Kozármisleny | 16 | (0) |
- * Club domestic league appearances and goals as of 18 May 2014

István Vituska (born 25 August 1988) is a Hungarian footballer who currently plays as a midfielder for Kozármisleny SE.
