= Attila Hullám =

Hungarian footballer

Personal information
- Full name: Attila Hullám
- Date of birth: 11 February 1987 (age 39)
- Place of birth: Budapest, Hungary
- Height: 1.75 m (5 ft 9 in)
- Position: Midfielder

Team information
- Current team: Tatabánya
- Number: 20

Youth career
- 1997–2001: Vasas
- 2001–2005: Újpest

Senior career*
Years	Team	Apps	(Gls)
2005–2010	Újpest	29	(1)
2007	→ Tatabánya (loan)	7	(0)
2007–2008	→ Sopron (loan)	6	(0)
2009	→ Szolnok (loan)	5	(1)
2009–2010	→ Vecsés (loan)	13	(5)
2010–2011	→ Újpest II	22	(1)
2011–2012	Biatorbágy	11	(8)
2012–2013	Szigetszentmiklós	26	(9)
2013	Kecskemét	6	(0)
2013–2014	Paks	8	(0)
2014–	Tatabánya	1	(0)
- * Club domestic league appearances and goals as of 1 March 2014

Attila Hullám (born 11 February 1987) is a Hungarian footballer who used to play as a midfielder for Újpest FC. He retired from professional football on January 1, 2022, with his last club listed as UFC Mettmach.
