= Krisztián Vermes =

Hungarian footballer

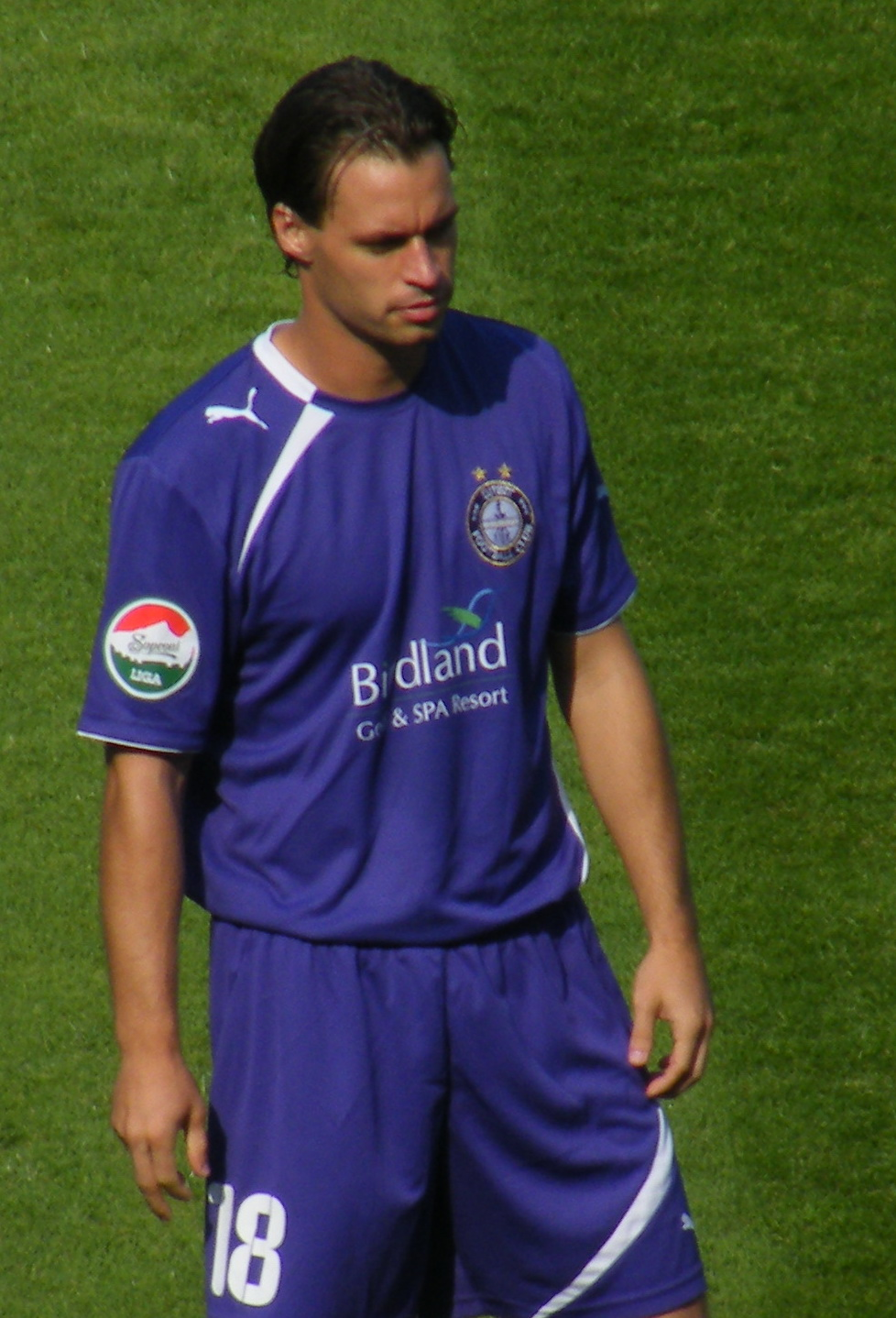

Personal information
- Full name: Krisztián Vermes
- Date of birth: 7 July 1985 (age 41)
- Place of birth: Budapest, Hungary
- Height: 1.85 m (6 ft 1 in)
- Position: Centre back

Youth career
- –2004: BVSC

Senior career*
Years	Team	Apps	(Gls)
2004–2014	Újpest	159	(5)
2008–2009	→ Sparta Rotterdam (loan)	33	(0)
2014	Mezőkövesd	3	(0)
2014–2015	Kaposvári Rákóczi	17	(0)
2015–2016	Szolnok	28	(0)
2016–2018	Kisvárda FC	34	(0)
2018–2020	Unione FC Budapest	24	(1)

International career
2005–2011	Hungary	6	(0)
- * Club domestic league appearances and goals as of 17:43, 24 March 2021 (UTC)

Krisztián Vermes (born 7 July 1985) is a retired Hungarian footballer who played as a centre back.

== Club career ==
Born in Budapest, Vermes came through the youth ranks at BVSC Budapest, clinching a move to Újpest FC for whom he made his professional league debut in the 2004–05 season.

In summer 2008 he sealed a move to Eredivisie side Sparta Rotterdam. He played 32 league and 3 KNVB cup games in 2008–09 season.

== International career ==
Vermes made his debut for Hungary in a December 2005 friendly match against Mexico and earned his second and last cap so far in the same month against Caribbean minnows Antigua and Barbuda. Both games are recognized by FIFA and the Hungarian FA as full internationals but were played with a B-side.
