= Balázs Tóth (footballer, born 1980) =

Hungarian footballer

Personal information
- Date of birth: 2 March 1980 (age 46)
- Place of birth: Kaposvár, Hungary
- Height: 1.83 m (6 ft 0 in)
- Position: Defender

Team information
- Current team: Csákvár (manager)

Youth career
- 2000–2003: Kaposvár

Senior career*
Years	Team	Apps	(Gls)
2003–2005	Kaposvár	62	(5)
2005–2007	Újpest	47	(0)
2007–2008	Honvéd	9	(1)
2008–2009	Vasas	12	(0)
2009–2010	Al-Oruba		
2010	Siófok	12	(2)
2010–2012	Gyirmót	36	(2)
2012	Vasas	6	(2)
2012–2014	Puskás Akadémia	49	(1)
2014–2015	Szeged	5	(0)
2015	Þór Akureyri	11	(0)
2016–2018	Szolnok	43	(0)
2018–2020	Dunafém-Maroshegy		
2020–2021	Puskás Akadémia II		

Managerial career
- 2022–: Csákvár
- * Club domestic league appearances and goals

Balázs Tóth (born 2 March 1980) is a professional Hungarian football coach and a former player. He is the manager of Csákvár.
