= 2005–06 Vasas SC season =

Vasas
2005–06 season
- Manager: Sándor Egervári (until 5 December 2005); Péter Antal (caretaker, from 5 December to 20 December); Attila Pintér (from 20 December)
- Stadium: Illovszky Rudolf Stadion
- Nemzeti Bajnokság I: 15th
- Magyar Kupa: Runners-up
- UEFA Intertoto Cup: First round
- Highest home attendance: 6,000 v Újpest (4 March 2006, Nemzeti Bajnokság I)
- Lowest home attendance: 600 v Pápa (26 October 2005, Magyar Kupa)
- Average home league attendance: 2,733
- Biggest win: 3–0 v Rákospalota (Away, 17 September 2005, Nemzeti Bajnokság I); 3–0 v Pécs (Home, 24 September 2005, Nemzeti Bajnokság I)
- Biggest defeat: 0–3 v Fehérvár (Home, 27 August 2005, Nemzeti Bajnokság I); 0–3 v Zalaegerszeg (Away, 26 November 2005, Nemzeti Bajnokság I); 0–3 v MTK (Away, 10 December 2005, Nemzeti Bajnokság I); 1–4 v Kaposvár (Away, 27 May 2006, Nemzeti Bajnokság I)

The 2005–06 season was Vasas Sport Club's 78th competitive season, 2nd consecutive season in the Nemzeti Bajnokság I and 100th season in existence as a football club. In addition to the domestic league, Vasas participated in that season's editions of the Magyar Kupa and the UEFA Intertoto Cup.

== Squad ==
Squad at end of season

Note: Flags indicate national team as defined under FIFA eligibility rules; some limited exceptions apply. Players may hold more than one non-FIFA nationality.

No.	Pos.	Nation	Player
1	GK	HUN	Csaba Borszéki
2	DF	HUN	Zoltán Molnár
4	DF	HUN	György Kiss
6	MF	HUN	János Zováth
7	DF	SRB	Ivan Janjić
8	DF	HUN	Dániel Kollár
9	FW	HUN	Róbert Waltner
10	MF	HUN	Árpád Majoros
11	MF	HUN	Zoltán Pintér
12	GK	HUN	Ádám Bogdán
13	DF	HUN	Gyula Hegedűs
14	MF	HUN	Zsolt Bárányos
15	MF	HUN	János Lázok

No.	Pos.	Nation	Player
16	MF	SVN	Adem Kapič
18	MF	HUN	Norbert Németh
19	DF	SVK	Otto Szabó
20	MF	HUN	Henrik Rósa
21	DF	HUN	András Tóth
22	FW	HUN	Szabolcs Gyánó
23	MF	HUN	Tamás Tandari
25	DF	HUN	Zoltán Fehér
27	DF	HUN	Zsolt Balog
28	DF	HUN	Norbert Hegedűs
29	MF	HUN	Dániel Völgyi
30	FW	HUN	Csaba Csordás
33	GK	HUN	Gábor Németh

== Competitions ==
=== Overview ===
Competition	First match	Last match	Starting round	Final position	Record							
Competition	First match	Last match	Starting round	Final position	Pld	W	D	L	GF	GA	GD	Win %
Nemzeti Bajnokság I	30 July 2005	3 June 2006	Matchday 1	15th	30	5	10	15	32	47	−15	16.67
Magyar Kupa	6 September 2005	17 May 2006	Second round	Runners-up	9	6	2	1	16	10	+6	66.67
UEFA Intertoto Cup	18 June 2005	26 June 2005	First round	First round	2	0	1	1	0	2	−2	0.00
Total					41	11	13	17	48	59	−11	26.83

Source: Competitions

=== Nemzeti Bajnokság I ===
==== League table ====
Pos	Team	Pld	W	D	L	GF	GA	GD	Pts	Qualification or relegation
12	Pécs	30	8	9	13	37	41	−4	33	
13	Honvéd	30	8	9	13	33	52	−19	33	
14	Rákospalota	30	7	5	18	30	59	−29	26	
15	Vasas	30	5	10	15	32	47	−15	25	
16	Pápa (R)	30	5	7	18	30	76	−46	22	Relegated to Nemzeti Bajnokság II

Source: RSSSF
(R) Relegated

==== Results summary ====
Overall								Home						Away					
Pld	W	D	L	GF	GA	GD	Pts	W	D	L	GF	GA	GD	W	D	L	GF	GA	GD
30	5	10	15	32	47	−15	25	3	5	7	16	20	−4	2	5	8	16	27	−11

Source: Competitions

==== Matches ====
30 July 2005 1	Vasas	1–2	Győr	Budapest
19:00 CEST (UTC+2)	A. Tóth (yellow card) 66'; Gyánó 71' (pen.)	Report	Jäkl (yellow card) 13'; Priskin 25', 32'; Regedei (yellow card) 32'	Stadium: Illovszky Rudolf Stadion; Attendance: 2,500; Referee: Csaba Imre Sápi; Assistant referees: L. Tóth L., T. Vígh

6 August 2005 2	Újpest	2–2	Vasas	Budapest
19:00 CEST (UTC+2)	Z. Kovács I 18', (yellow card) 45'; Vituska (yellow card) 65'; Vaskó 86'	Report	N. Németh (yellow card) 20'; Füzi (yellow card) 22'; Z. Molnár (yellow card) 31'; Bárányos 42' (pen.); Janjić (yellow card) 69'; Waltner 74'	Stadium: Szusza Ferenc Stadion; Attendance: 4,000; Referee: Viktor Kassai; Assistant referees: G. Erős, A. Kelemen

21 August 2005 3	Vasas	2–0	Diósgyőr	Budapest
19:00 CEST (UTC+2)	Z. Molnár (yellow card) 5'; Elek 15'; Bárányos 87'	Report		Stadium: Illovszky Rudolf Stadion; Attendance: 4,000; Referee: Sándor Gergely; Assistant referees: P. Tóth, Albert

27 August 2005 4	Vasas	0–3	Fehérvár	Budapest
19:00 CEST (UTC+2)	Bárányos (yellow card)	Report	Disztl (yellow card); Csizmadia 6'; Koller 78'; Alumona 87'	Stadium: Illovszky Rudolf Stadion; Attendance: 4,000; Referee: János Megyebíró; Assistant referees: Szpisják, I. Medovarszki; Fourth official: S. Szabó

17 September 2005 5	Rákospalota	0–3	Vasas	Budapest
16:00 CEST (UTC+2)	Sallai (yellow card) 20'; Török (yellow card) 26'; B. Kovács (yellow card) 55'; G. Horváth I (yellow card) 56'; G. Nagy I (yellow card) 89'	Report	Salamon 15'; Z. Molnár (yellow card) 31'; Gyánó 51', (yellow card) 75'; Bárányos (red card) 56'; H. Rósa 89' (pen.)	Stadium: Budai II. László Stadion; Attendance: 2,500; Referee: Attila Hanacsek; Assistant referees: P. Kovács, I. A. Nagy

24 September 2005 6	Vasas	3–0	Pécs	Budapest
19:00 CEST (UTC+2)	Gyánó 32', 78' (pen.), 90+3'; Völgyi (yellow card) 41'	Report	N. Sipos (yellow card) 57'; Szögedi (yellow card) 77'	Stadium: Illovszky Rudolf Stadion; Attendance: 3,000; Referee: István Vad

3 October 2005 7	Debrecen	2–2	Vasas	Debrecen
18:15 CEST (UTC+2)	Sidibe 12'; P. Máté II (yellow card) 22'; Brnović 52'	Report	Janjić 38'; H. Rósa (yellow card) 51'; Elek (yellow card) 60'; Füzi (yellow card) 85'; Salamon (yellow card) 89'; Gyánó 90+1'; Waltner (yellow card) 90+3'	Stadium: Oláh Gábor utcai Stadion; Attendance: 6,500; Referee: Mihály Fábián; Assistant referees: Ortó, Márkus

15 October 2005 8	Vasas	1–1	Tatabánya	Budapest
18:00 CEST (UTC+2)	Waltner 79', (yellow card) 85'	Report	Jerson (yellow card) 31'; Filó 33'	Stadium: Illovszky Rudolf Stadion; Attendance: 3,500; Referee: Sándor Gergely; Assistant referees: L. Varga II, I. A. Nagy

22 October 2005 9	Sopron	2–0	Vasas	Sopron
18:00 CEST (UTC+2)	Coțan 53'; Cigan (yellow card) 64'; Bagoly 73'	Report	A. Tóth (yellow card) 21'; Z. Molnár (yellow card) 41'; H. Rósa (yellow card) 43'; Bárányos (yellow card) 52'	Stadium: Káposztás utcai Stadion; Attendance: 4,000; Referee: Zoltán Szarka; Assistant referees: T. Szabó, Z. Kovács

29 October 2005 10	Vasas	0–1	Ferencváros	Budapest
18:00 CEST (UTC+2)	Waltner (yellow card) 60'; A. Tóth (yellow card) 82'	Report	D. Rósa 47' (pen.); Bognár (yellow card) 58'; Szálkai (yellow card) 81'; Lipcsei (red card) 85'; Bartha (yellow card) 87'	Stadium: Illovszky Rudolf Stadion; Attendance: 5,000; Referee: Ferenc Bede; Assistant referees: Tompos, I. Tóth

5 November 2005 11	Honvéd	2–2	Vasas	Budapest
18:00 CET (UTC+1)	Z. Takács 33' (pen.); Z. Kovács II (yellow card) 37', (goal) 78'; Venczel (yellow card) 86'; Udvari (red card) 87'	Report	Völgyi (yellow card) 27'; Salamon (yellow card) 33'; Füzi (yellow card) 47'; Gyánó 73'; Z. Molnár (red card) 87'; Bárányos 90'	Stadium: Bozsik József Stadion; Attendance: 3,500; Referee: János Megyebíró; Assistant referees: Szpisják, P. Tóth

19 November 2005 12	Vasas	1–1	Pápa	Budapest
15:00 CET (UTC+1)	Völgyi (yellow card) 29'; Zováth (yellow card) 31'; Gyánó (yellow card) 35'; A. Tóth (yellow card) 65'; Bárányos 85'	Report	Kovrig 8'; Kincses (yellow card) 40'; Facskó (yellow card) 45'; Mumba (yellow card) 49'	Stadium: Illovszky Rudolf Stadion; Attendance: 1,000; Referee: Csaba Imre Sápi; Assistant referees: L. Tóth L., T. Végh

26 November 2005 13	Zalaegerszeg	3–0	Vasas	Zalaegerszeg
17:00 CET (UTC+1)	Montvai 14'; Kriston 16'; V. Sebők 75' (pen.)	Report	Salamon (yellow card) 77'; Lázok (yellow card) 86'	Stadium: ZTE Arena; Attendance: 2,200; Referee: József Erdős; Assistant referees: Z. Kovács, Z. Szalai

3 December 2005 14	Vasas	0–2	Kaposvár	Budapest
15:00 CET (UTC+1)	Weitner (yellow card) 88'; Gyánó (red card) 90'	Report	Zahorecz (yellow card) 18'; Oláh 41'; Zsolnai 53'; Finta (yellow card) 60'; Maróti (yellow card) 76'	Stadium: Illovszky Rudolf Stadion; Attendance: 1,000; Referee: Attila Hanacsek; Assistant referees: Z. Tompos, P. Kovács

10 December 2005 15	MTK	3–0	Vasas	Budapest
15:00 CET (UTC+1)	Hrepka 25', 45'; B. Balogh 37'	Report	Majoros (yellow card) 35'	Stadium: Hidegkuti Nándor Stadion; Attendance: 700; Referee: János Makai; Assistant referees: Kispál, I. Mészáros

25 February 2006 16	Győr	2–1	Vasas	Győr
16:00 CET (UTC+1)	Vincze 19'; P. Tóth (yellow card) 22'; Jäkl (yellow card) 25'; Lajtos (yellow card) 29'; Priskin (yellow card) 65'; Mátyus 90+4'	Report	G. Hegedűs (yellow card) 31'; Zs. Balog 51'; Fehér (yellow card) 60'; Waltner (red card) 62'; Kapič (yellow card) 71'	Stadium: Stadion ETO; Attendance: 700; Referee: Szabolcs Saskőy; Assistant referees: F. Székely, Heibl

4 March 2006 17	Vasas	2–3	Újpest	Budapest
15:00 CET (UTC+1)	Gyánó 3', (yellow card) 37'; Bárányos 13'; A. Tóth (yellow card) 29'; Kapič (yellow card) 45'; Z. Pintér (yellow card) 76'; G. Hegedűs (yellow card) 85'	Report	Rajczi 49', 52'; B. Tóth (yellow card) 68'; N. Tóth 76'	Stadium: Illovszky Rudolf Stadion; Attendance: 6,000; Referee: Zsolt Szabó; Assistant referees: Kispál, Erős

11 March 2006 18	Diósgyőr	0–2	Vasas	Miskolc
16:00 CET (UTC+1)	Simon (yellow card) 48'	Report	H. Rósa 12'; O. Szabó 77'; Kapič (yellow card) 80'	Stadium: Diósgyőri Stadion; Attendance: 4,000; Referee: József Erdős; Assistant referees: Kelemen, L. Tóth L.

18 March 2006 19	Fehérvár	1–0	Vasas	Székesfehérvár
16:00 CET (UTC+1)	Koller (yellow card) 63'; Božić 65'	Report	Z. Pintér (yellow card) 12'; Fehér (yellow card) 17'; Z. Molnár (yellow card) 45'; A. Tóth (yellow card) 71' (yellow-red card) 73'	Stadium: Sóstói Stadion; Attendance: 4,000; Referee: Csaba Imre Sápi; Assistant referees: P. Szabó, I. A. Nagy

25 March 2006 20	Vasas	2–2	Rákospalota	Budapest
17:00 CET (UTC+1)	Gyánó 30', 32'; Kapič (yellow card) 58'; G. Hegedűs (yellow card) 88'	Report	Torma 2'; Polonkai 86'; G. Nagy I (yellow card) 90+2'	Stadium: Illovszky Rudolf Stadion; Attendance: 3,000; Referee: Sándor Gergely; Assistant referees: L. Varga II, P. Tóth

1 April 2006 21	Pécs	0–0	Vasas	Pécs
17:00 CEST (UTC+2)	Schindler (yellow card) 7'; Győri (yellow card) 13'; Kalina (yellow card) 17'; Pavičević (yellow card) 52'; Kulcsár (yellow card) 81'	Report	Fehér (yellow card) 17' (yellow-red card) 69'	Stadium: Stadion PMFC; Attendance: 2,000; Referee: Zsolt Szabó; Assistant referees: Kispál, Hegyi

8 April 2006 22	Vasas	0–1	Debrecen	Budapest
17:00 CEST (UTC+2)	Bárányos (yellow card) 43'; Zováth (yellow card) 69'; Janjić (red card) 90+1'	Report	Böőr (yellow card) 29'; P. Máté II 62'	Stadium: Illovszky Rudolf Stadion; Attendance: 3,000; Referee: József Erdős; Assistant referees: Szpisják, I. Albert

15 April 2006 23	Tatabánya	2–2	Vasas	Tatabánya
15:00 CEST (UTC+2)	Nallbani (yellow card) 7'; Kerényi 36', 77'; Ngalle (yellow card) 90'	Report	Vámosi (yellow card) 15'; Z. Pintér (yellow card) 27'; Fehér (yellow card) 44'; Filó 58' (o.g.); H. Rósa (yellow card) 87'; Waltner 90'	Stadium: Városi Stadion; Attendance: 3,500; Referee: Mihály Fábián; Assistant referees: Ortó, Márkus

21 April 2006 24	Vasas	1–1	Sopron	Budapest
19:00 CEST (UTC+2)	Zs. Balog (yellow card) 55'; Csordás 75'	Report	Munteanu 90'	Stadium: Illovszky Rudolf Stadion; Attendance: 2,500; Referee: Tamás Arany; Assistant referees: Vámos, I. Tóth

29 April 2006 25	Ferencváros	3–1	Vasas	Budapest
15:00 CEST (UTC+2)	Bajevski 9'; Botiș 34'; Lazić (yellow card) 68'; Jovánczai 80'; Lipcsei (yellow card) 82'	Report	Zováth (yellow card) 16'; Fehér (yellow card) 56'; H. Rósa 61'	Stadium: Üllői úti Stadion; Attendance: 4,862; Referee: Csaba Imre Sápi; Assistant referees: Kispál, Z. Szalai

5 May 2006 26	Vasas	1–2	Honvéd	Budapest
19:00 CEST (UTC+2)	Z. Molnár (yellow card) 5'; Bárányos (yellow card) 37'; Janjić (yellow card) 55'; A. Tóth (yellow card) 81'; O. Szabó 88'	Report	Dobos (yellow card) 2'; Ráthy (yellow card) 10'; Csobánki 21'; Schrancz (yellow card) 71'; Dancs 74'	Stadium: Illovszky Rudolf Stadion; Attendance: 800; Referee: István Vad; Assistant referees: Z. Szalai, T. Vígh

13 May 2006 27	Pápa	1–0	Vasas	Pápa
19:00 CEST (UTC+2)	Honma (yellow card) 59'; Z. Szabó 90'	Report	G. Hegedűs (yellow card) 22'; Janjić (yellow card) 79'	Stadium: Perutz Stadion; Attendance: 3,000; Referee: Tamás Arany; Assistant referees: G. Kovács, I. A. Nagy

20 May 2006 28	Vasas	0–0	Zalaegerszeg	Budapest
18:00 CEST (UTC+2)	O. Szabó (yellow card) 89'	Report	J. Sebők (yellow card) 18'; Vasas (yellow card) 75'	Stadium: Illovszky Rudolf Stadion; Attendance: 1,000; Referee: Sándor Andó-Szabó; Assistant referees: Hegyi, I. Albert

27 May 2006 29	Kaposvár	4–1	Vasas	Kaposvár
19:00 CEST (UTC+2)	Vasiljević 19'; Finta (yellow card) 21'; Kriston 47', 49'; Alves 71'	Report	Kapič (yellow card) 29'; Zováth (yellow card) 43'; Gyánó 74'; Bárányos (yellow card) 79'	Stadium: Rákóczi Stadion; Attendance: 2,000; Referee: Viktor Kassai; Assistant referees: L. Varga II, I. A. Nagy

3 June 2006 30	Vasas	2–1	MTK	Budapest
16:20 CEST (UTC+2)	Bárányos (yellow card) 29'; Z. Molnár (yellow card) 35', (goal) 74'; G. Hegedűs (yellow card) 38'; Zs. Balog 58'	Report	Hrepka 15'; Rodenbücher (yellow card) 63'	Stadium: Illovszky Rudolf Stadion; Attendance: 700; Referee: Csaba Imre Sápi; Assistant referees: T. Vígh, Schuszter

=== Magyar Kupa ===
6 September 2005 Second round	Dunakeszi	1–2	Vasas	Dunakeszi
16:00 CEST (UTC+2)	Mikesy (yellow card); Jávor (pen.)	Report	Bárányos (yellow card); Salamon (yellow card); Gyánó (pen.)	Stadium: Vasutas Sportpálya; Attendance: 300; Referee: Szabolcs Saskőy; Assistant referees: K. Selmeczi, Kerékgyártó

21 September 2005 Third round	Kazincbarcika	1–2	Vasas	Kazincbarcika
15:30 CEST (UTC+2)	Hompoth (yellow card); P. Kovács 76'	Report	Salamon (yellow card); Zováth (yellow card); Füzi 47'; Gyánó 63'	Stadium: Kazincbarcikai Sportközpont; Attendance: 2,600; Referee: Ferenc Bede; Assistant referees: Vámos, V. Tóth II.

==== Round of 16 ====
26 October 2005 First leg	Vasas	3–3	Pápa	Budapest
17:00 CEST (UTC+2)	Zováth (yellow card); Bárányos 39', 53'; Gyánó 65'	Report	Facskó (yellow card); A. Farkas (yellow card); Lipták (yellow card); Kincses 12'; Hercegfalvi 31'; Nikolić 36'	Stadium: Illovszky Rudolf Stadion; Attendance: 600; Referee: Mihály Fábián; Assistant referees: Ortó, T. Márkus

12 November 2005 Second leg	Pápa	1–2 (4–5 agg.)	Vasas	Pápa
17:00 CET (UTC+1)	Nikolić 52'	Report	Majoros 11'; Waltner 29'	Stadium: Perutz Stadion; Attendance: 1,000; Referee: Tamás Arany; Assistant referees: Dr. P. Kovács, I. A. Nagy
Note: Vasas won 5–4 on aggregate.

==== Quarter-finals ====
15 March 2006 First leg	Pécs	0–1	Vasas	Pécs
15:00 CET (UTC+1)	Lantos (yellow card) 8'; Kulcsár (yellow card) 37'	Report	A. Tóth (yellow card) 47'; H. Rósa 79'; Lázok (yellow card) 90'	Stadium: Stadion PMFC; Attendance: 1,200; Referee: Péter Solymosi; Assistant referees: T. Takács, S. Szilasi

22 March 2006 Second leg	Vasas	1–0 (2–0 agg.)	Pécs	Budapest
17:00 CET (UTC+1)	Gyánó 30'; Z. Pintér (yellow card) 80'	Report	Kulcsár (yellow card) 65'; Balaskó (yellow card) 66'	Stadium: Illovszky Rudolf Stadion; Attendance: 1,200; Referee: István Vad; Assistant referees: Szpisják, Albert
Note: Vasas won 2–0 on aggregate.

==== Semi-finals ====
26 April 2006 First leg	Honvéd	1–3	Vasas	Budapest
18:00 CEST (UTC+2)	N. Kovács (yellow card) 28'; Miró 48'; Dobos (yellow card) 69'	Report	Udvari 1' (o.g.); Gyánó 31'; Zs. Balog (yellow card) 57'; Bárányos 75'	Stadium: Bozsik József Stadion; Attendance: 1,500; Referee: János Megyebíró; Assistant referees: P. Tóth, Szpisják

2 May 2006 Second leg	Vasas	0–1 (3–2 agg.)	Honvéd	Budapest
18:00 CEST (UTC+2)	A. Tóth (yellow card) 12'; H. Rósa (red card) 45'; Waltner (yellow card) 83'	Report	Udvari (yellow card) 18'; Z. Takács (yellow card) 33'; Pomper (red card) 45'; Miró (yellow card) 72'; Dobos 73'; Schrancz (yellow card) 90'	Stadium: Illovszky Rudolf Stadion; Attendance: 1,000; Referee: Sándor Gergely; Assistant referees: L. Varga II, Z. Kovács
Note: Vasas won 3–2 on aggregate.

==== Final ====
17 May 2006 Final	Vasas	2–2 (a.e.t.) (5–6 p)	Fehérvár	Budapest
18:00 CEST (UTC+2)	Waltner 25', (yellow card) 119'; Kapič (yellow card) 51'; Zs. Balog 84'; Zováth (yellow card) 85'; Z. Molnár (yellow card) 110'	Report	Sitku 46', (yellow card) 62'; Schwarcz 57'	Stadium: Üllői úti Stadion; Attendance: 5,000; Referee: János Megyebíró; Assistant referees: F. Székely, Tompos
	Penalties
	Bárányos (penalty scored); Csordás (penalty scored); Gyánó (penalty scored); Janjić (penalty missed); A. Tóth (penalty scored); Zováth (penalty scored); Z. Molnár (penalty missed)		(penalty scored) Sitku; (penalty scored) F. Horváth; (penalty scored) Koller; (penalty missed) Dajić; (penalty scored) Csizmadia; (penalty scored) Kuttor; (penalty scored) Božić
Note: Fehérvár won 6–5 on penalties.

=== UEFA Intertoto Cup ===
==== First round ====
18 June 2005 First leg	Vasas (Hungary)	0–0	(Slovakia) Dubnica	Budapest, Hungary
19:00 CEST (UTC+2)	Waltner (yellow card) 84'	Report	Švestka (yellow card) 36'; Straka (yellow card) 65'; Pekarík (yellow card) 68'	Stadium: Illovszky Rudolf Stadion; Attendance: 1,000; Referee: Siniša Zrnić (Bosnia and Herzegovina); Assistant referees: Tule (Bosnia and Herzegovina), Stanić (Bosnia and Herzegovina)

26 June 2005 Second leg	Dubnica (Slovakia)	2–0 (2–0 agg.)	(Hungary) Vasas	Dubnica nad Váhom, Slovakia
17:30 CEST (UTC+2)	Kiška 21'; Pleva (yellow card) 31'; Kopačka (yellow card) 35'; Tesák 49'; Pekarík (yellow card) 68'; Perniš (yellow card) 76'	Report	Janjić (yellow card) 52'; Z. Molnár (yellow card) 62'	Stadium: Mestský štadión Attendance: 3,500; Referee: Marijo Strahonja (Croatia); Assistant referees: Krmar (Croatia), Vukusić (Croatia)
Note: Dubnica won 2–0 on aggregate.
