= 2005–06 Győri ETO FC season =

Győr
2005–06 season
- Manager: István Reszeli Soós (until 1 January 2006); János Csank (from 1 January 2006)
- Stadium: Stadion ETO
- Nemzeti Bajnokság I: 9th
- Magyar Kupa: Third round
- Highest home attendance: 4,000 (multiple Nemzeti Bajnokság I matches)
- Lowest home attendance: 350 v Kaposvár (6 May 2006, Nemzeti Bajnokság I)
- Average home league attendance: 1,583
- Biggest win: 4–0 v Pápa (Home, 22 April 2006, Nemzeti Bajnokság I); 4–0 v Kaposvár (Home, 6 May 2006, Nemzeti Bajnokság I)
- Biggest defeat: 2–5 v MTK (Away, 13 May 2006, Nemzeti Bajnokság I); 2–5 v Újpest (Home, 28 May 2006, Nemzeti Bajnokság I)

The 2005–06 season was Győri Egyetértés Torna Osztály Futball Club's 60th competitive season, 47th consecutive season in the Nemzeti Bajnokság I and 100th season in existence as a football club. In addition to the domestic league, Győr participated in that season's editions of the Magyar Kupa.

== Squad ==
Squad at end of season

Note: Flags indicate national team as defined under FIFA eligibility rules; some limited exceptions apply. Players may hold more than one non-FIFA nationality.

No.	Pos.	Nation	Player
1	GK	HUN	Péter Molnár
2	DF	HUN	József Zsók
3	DF	HUN	Viktor Hanák
4	DF	HUN	András Szabadfi
5	MF	HUN	István Bank
6	DF	HUN	Róbert Varga
7	MF	HUN	Tibor Hegedűs
8	DF	HUN	Csaba Regedei
9	FW	HUN	Dávid Lajtos
10	MF	HUN	Ottó Vincze
11	MF	HUN	Zoltán Varga
12	MF	HUN	Antal Jäkl
14	DF	HUN	Oliver Pusztai
15	MF	HUN	Péter Tóth

No.	Pos.	Nation	Player
16	FW	HUN	Balázs Granát
17	DF	HUN	János Mátyus
18	FW	HUN	Gábor Varga
19	FW	HUN	Péter Bajzát
20	MF	HUN	Tibor Nyári
21	DF	HUN	Zsolt Makra
22	GK	SCG	Saša Stevanović
23	MF	SVK	Károly Czanik
24	GK	HUN	Csaba Somogyi
25	FW	HUN	Zsolt Szabó
28	MF	HUN	Dávid Lajtos
30	FW	HUN	Tamás Priskin
32	DF	HUN	Péter Stark

== Competitions ==
=== Overview ===
Competition	First match	Last match	Starting round	Final position	Record							
Competition	First match	Last match	Starting round	Final position	Pld	W	D	L	GF	GA	GD	Win %
Nemzeti Bajnokság I	30 July 2005	3 June 2006	Matchday 1	9th	30	9	9	12	47	50	−3	30.00
Magyar Kupa	10 September 2005	21 September 2005	Second round	Third round	2	1	1	0	4	2	+2	50.00
Total					32	10	10	12	51	52	−1	31.25

Source: Competitions

=== Nemzeti Bajnokság I ===
==== League table ====
Pos	Team	Pld	W	D	L	GF	GA	GD	Pts	Qualification or relegation
7	Kaposvár	30	10	7	13	35	41	−6	37	
8	Diósgyőr	30	10	7	13	33	44	−11	37	
9	Győr	30	9	9	12	47	50	−3	36	
10	Sopron	30	9	8	13	39	39	0	35	Qualification for Intertoto Cup second round
11	Zalaegerszeg	30	9	8	13	42	47	−5	35	

Source: RSSSF

==== Results summary ====
Overall								Home						Away					
Pld	W	D	L	GF	GA	GD	Pts	W	D	L	GF	GA	GD	W	D	L	GF	GA	GD
30	9	9	12	47	50	−3	36	5	4	6	26	24	+2	4	5	6	21	26	−5

Source: Competitions

==== Results by round ====
Round	1	2	3	4	5	6	7	8	9	10	11	12	13	14	15	16	17	18	19	20	21	22	23	24	25	26	27	28	29	30
Ground	A	H	A	H	A	H	A	H	A	H	A	H	A	A	H	H	A	H	A	H	A	H	A	H	A	H	A	H	H	A
Result	W	D	W	L	D	W	L	L	W	W	L	L	D	L	L	W	W	D	D	D	L	D	L	W	D	W	L	L	L	D
Position	1	4	4	6	7	6	7	8	6	5	5	6	7	7	8	7	5	5	6	5	7	8	9	7	9	6	6	7	8	9
Points	3	4	7	7	8	11	11	11	14	17	17	17	18	18	18	21	24	25	26	27	27	28	28	31	32	35	35	35	35	36

A = Away; H = Home; W = Win; D = Draw; L = Loss

==== Matches ====
30 July 2005 1	Vasas	1–2	Győr	Budapest
19:00 CEST (UTC+2)	A. Tóth (yellow card) 66'; Gyánó 71' (pen.)	Report	Jäkl (yellow card) 13'; Priskin 25', 32'; Regedei (yellow card) 32'	Stadium: Illovszky Rudolf Stadion; Attendance: 2,500; Referee: Csaba Imre Sápi; Assistant referees: L. Tóth L., T. Vígh

6 August 2005 2	Győr	2–2	Rákospalota	Győr
19:00 CEST (UTC+2)	Kenesei (yellow card) 14', (goal) 60'; Makra (yellow card) 42'; Vincze (yellow card) 56'; Bajzát 70'	Report	G. Nagy I (yellow card) 18' (yellow-red card) 49'; Török 28'; Földvári (yellow card) 52'; Cseri (red card) 60'; Polonkai 68'	Stadium: Stadion ETO; Attendance: 4,000; Referee: Szabolcs Saskőy; Assistant referees: F. Székely, Heibl

20 August 2005 3	Pécs	0–1	Győr	Pécs
19:00 CEST (UTC+2)	Schindler (yellow card) 6'; Bajúsz (yellow card) 49'; Gy. Horváth (yellow card) 71'	Report	Zsók (yellow card) 32'; Vincze 34' (pen.)	Stadium: Stadion PMFC; Attendance: 2,500; Referee: János Makai; Assistant referees: Hegyi, G. Takács

28 August 2005 4	Győr	1–2	Debrecen	Győr
11:30 CEST (UTC+2)	Lendvai (yellow card) 6'; Sidibe 17' (o.g.); P. Tóth (yellow card) 67'; Vincze (yellow card) 76'; Makra (yellow card) 76'	Report	Komlósi (yellow card) 26'; Szatmári (yellow card) 27'; Z. Kiss (yellow card) 38'; Bogdanović 52'; Brnović 59'	Stadium: Stadion ETO; Attendance: 2,000; Referee: Zsolt Szabó; Assistant referees: P. Hegyi, Z. Tompos

18 September 2005 5	Tatabánya	3–3	Győr	Tatabánya
11:30 CEST (UTC+2)	Z. Tóth 43'; Rajnay (yellow card) 55'; Márkus 60', 78'; K. Németh I (yellow card) 86'	Report	Lendvai (yellow card) 13'; Priskin 28', 37', 90+3'; Mátyus (yellow card) 39'; Z. Varga II (yellow card) 76'	Stadium: Városi Stadion; Attendance: 1,500; Referee: Tamás Arany; Assistant referees: Z. Szalai, R. Kispál

24 September 2005 6	Győr	2–1	Sopron	Győr
19:00 CEST (UTC+2)	Vincze 6' (pen.); Kenesei 26'	Report	T. Horváth I (yellow card) 5'; Landerl 44'; Bagoly (yellow card) 48'; Vén (yellow card) 67'	Stadium: Stadion ETO; Attendance: 1,500; Referee: Sándor Gergely; Assistant referees: I. Mészáros, L. Varga II

2 October 2005 7	Ferencváros	2–0	Győr	Budapest
11:30 CEST (UTC+2)	Szálkai (yellow card) 40'; Nógrádi 67'; Tímár (yellow card) 69'; Erős (yellow card) 90'; Laczkó 90+1'	Report	Vincze (yellow card) 35'; Lendvai (yellow card) 45'; Priskin (yellow card) 57'; Stark (yellow card) 80'; Kenesei (yellow card) 90+2'	Stadium: Üllői úti Stadion; Attendance: 1,500; Referee: Viktor Kassai; Assistant referees: G. Erős, A. Kelemen

15 October 2005 8	Győr	1–2	Honvéd	Győr
18:00 CEST (UTC+2)	Kenesei 28' (pen.); P. Tóth (yellow card) 47'; Makra (yellow card) 78'	Report	Miró 10'; Genito (yellow card) 31'; Z. Kovács II (yellow card) 39'; Udvari (yellow card) 42'; Takács 87'	Stadium: Stadion ETO; Attendance: 1,500; Referee: János Makai; Assistant referees: Z. Tompos, Z. Szalai

22 October 2005 9	Pápa	1–4	Győr	Pápa
18:00 CEST (UTC+2)	Stark 48' (o.g.); Lipták (yellow card) 67'; Kincses (yellow card) 77'	Report	Kenesei 45', 60'; Vincze 79', 80'; R. Horváth (yellow card) 88'	Stadium: Perutz Stadion; Attendance: 1,600; Referee: József Erdős; Assistant referees: Gaál, L. Varga II

29 October 2005 10	Győr	2–1	Zalaegerszeg	Győr
18:00 CEST (UTC+2)	Stark (yellow card) 5'; R. Horváth (yellow card) 32'; Kenesei 38'; Priskin 81'	Report	Balog (yellow card) 28'; Kozmér (yellow card) 37'; Bojović (yellow card) 70'; Đorović 87'	Stadium: Stadion ETO; Attendance: 1,000; Referee: Szabolcs Saskőy; Assistant referees: Székely, Heibl

5 November 2005 11	Kaposvár	1–0	Győr	Kaposvár
18:00 CET (UTC+1)	Kardos 67'; Mező (yellow card) 88'	Report	Lendvai (yellow card) 36'; Priskin (yellow card) 75'	Stadium: Rákóczi Stadion; Attendance: 1,500; Referee: Zoltán Szarka; Assistant referees: Vámos, Szalai

19 November 2005 12	Győr	1–3	MTK	Győr
17:00 CET (UTC+1)	Perić (yellow card) 25'; Vincze 59' (pen.)	Report	Kanta 14' (pen.), 33'; B. Balogh 26'; Zsidai (yellow card) 56'	Stadium: Stadion ETO; Attendance: 800; Referee: Péter Solymosi; Assistant referees: G. Takács, Z. Kovács

26 November 2005 13	Fehérvár	2–2	Győr	Székesfehérvár
17:00 CET (UTC+1)	Sitku 29', 69'; Bartyik (yellow card) 85'	Report	Priskin (yellow card) 20'; Kenesei 46', 89'	Stadium: Sóstói Stadion; Attendance: 5,000; Referee: János Megyebíró; Assistant referees: Szpisják, P. Tóth

4 December 2005 14	Újpest	3–1	Győr	Budapest
11:30 CET (UTC+1)	Rajczi 45'; Feczesin 58'; Jäkl 77' (o.g.); Vituska (yellow card) 90+2'	Report	Bajzát (yellow card) 11'; Makra (yellow card) 14'; Vincze (yellow card) 23'; Pusztai (yellow card) 34'; Mátyus 51', (yellow card) 82'	Stadium: Szusza Ferenc Stadion; Attendance: 3,435; Referee: Zsolt Szabó; Assistant referees: Kispál, Hegyi

10 December 2005 15	Győr	1–2	Diósgyőr	Győr
15:00 CET (UTC+1)	Lendvai (yellow card) 6'; Granát 87'; Regedei (yellow card) 90'	Report	Katona 24'; Halgas (yellow card) 38'; F. Horváth 74'; Z. Pintér (yellow card) 79'	Stadium: Stadion ETO; Attendance: 1,000; Referee: József Erdős; Assistant referees: G. Takács, Z. Szalai

25 February 2006 16	Győr	2–1	Vasas	Győr
16:00 CET (UTC+1)	Vincze 19'; P. Tóth (yellow card) 22'; Jäkl (yellow card) 25'; Lajtos (yellow card) 29'; Priskin (yellow card) 65'; Mátyus 90+4'	Report	Hegedűs (yellow card) 31'; Balog 51'; Fehér (yellow card) 60'; Waltner (red card) 62'; Kapič (yellow card) 71'	Stadium: Stadion ETO; Attendance: 700; Referee: Szabolcs Saskőy; Assistant referees: F. Székely, Heibl

4 March 2006 17	Rákospalota	1–2	Győr	Budapest
14:30 CET (UTC+1)	Polonkai (yellow card) 30'; Torma (yellow card) 44'; Nyerges 48', (yellow card) 75'; B. Kovács (yellow card) 73'	Report	Priskin 15', (yellow card) 21'; Bank (yellow card) 54'; Vincze 81' (pen.)	Stadium: Budai II. László Stadion; Attendance: 1,000; Referee: Mihály Fábián; Assistant referees: Ortó, I. Tóth

11 March 2006 18	Győr	1–1	Pécs	Győr
16:00 CET (UTC+1)	Priskin 43', (yellow card) 55'	Report	Kulcsár (yellow card) 34'; Jevdjovic 67'; Sólyom (yellow card) 80'	Stadium: Stadion ETO; Attendance: 1,500; Referee: Viktor Kassai; Assistant referees: G. Erős, R. Kispál

19 March 2006 19	Debrecen	1–1	Győr	Debrecen
11:30 CET (UTC+1)	Sidibe 42' (pen.); Komlósi (yellow card) 50'	Report	Bajzát (yellow card) 35', (goal) 39'; Pusztai (yellow card) 61'	Stadium: Oláh Gábor utcai Stadion; Attendance: 6,000; Referee: József Erdős; Assistant referees: L. Tóth L., T. Vígh

24 March 2006 20	Győr	0–0	Tatabánya	Győr
19:00 CET (UTC+1)		Report	Rajnay (yellow card) 64'; Z. Tóth (yellow card) 77'	Stadium: Stadion ETO; Attendance: 1,500; Referee: Péter Solymosi; Assistant referees: P. Hegyi, Kispál

1 April 2006 21	Sopron	2–0	Győr	Sopron
15:00 CEST (UTC+2)	A. Horváth 4' (pen.); Sifter (yellow card) 43'; Radu 50', (yellow card) 62'; Bagoly (yellow card) 80'; Feczesin (yellow card) 86'	Report	Stevanović (yellow card) 4'; Vincze (yellow card) 20'; Pusztai (yellow card) 69'	Stadium: Káposztás utcai Stadion; Attendance: 4,200; Referee: Sándor Gergely; Assistant referees: G. Takács, Z. Szalai

9 April 2006 22	Győr	1–1	Ferencváros	Győr
11:30 CEST (UTC+2)	Bajzát 89', (yellow card) 90'	Report	Tőzsér 47'	Stadium: Stadion ETO; Attendance: 2,000; Referee: tamás Arany; Assistant referees: Vámos, Tompos

15 April 2006 23	Honvéd	3–2	Győr	Budapest
18:00 CEST (UTC+2)	Dobos 3', 18'; Udvari (yellow card) 33'; Genito 88'	Report	Vincze (yellow card) 8', (goal) 9'; Priskin 90+2'	Stadium: Bozsik József Stadion; Attendance: 1,500; Referee: Csaba Imre Sápi; Assistant referees: I. Tóth, L. Tóth. L.

22 April 2006 24	Győr	4–0	Pápa	Győr
18:00 CEST (UTC+2)	Priskin 6', 64'; Mátyus 19' (pen.); Bajzát 35'; P. Tóth (yellow card) 79'	Report	Lipták (yellow card) 27'; Honma (yellow card) 54'; Gaál (yellow card) 78'; Élder (yellow card) 84'; Zo. Szabó II (yellow card) 89'	Stadium: Stadion ETO; Attendance: 1,000; Referee: Zsolt Szabó; Assistant referees: T.Vámos, B. Világi

29 April 2006 25	Zalaegerszeg	0–0	Győr	Zalaegerszeg
18:00 CEST (UTC+2)	V. Sebők (yellow card) 4'; Perić (yellow card) 26'; J. Sebők (yellow card) 74'	Report	G. Varga (yellow card) 38'; Zsók (yellow card) 43'; Bajzát (yellow card) 53'; Priskin (red card) 70'	Stadium: ZTE Arena; Attendance: 1,500; Referee: Szabolcs Saskőy; Assistant referees: Székely, Z. Kovács

6 May 2006 26	Győr	4–0	Kaposvár	Győr
19:00 CEST (UTC+2)	Bajzát 9', 35'; Granát 12', 31'; Mátyus (yellow card) 20'	Report	Petrók (yellow card) 4'; Alves (yellow card) 82'	Stadium: Stadion ETO; Attendance: 350; Referee: István Mészáros; Assistant referees: P. Szabó, K. Pánczél

13 May 2006 27	MTK	5–2	Győr	Budapest
19:00 CEST (UTC+2)	Kanta 4', 15', 49'; Regedei 60' (o.g.); K. Németh II 90+2'	Report	Zsók (yellow card) 41'; Vincze (yellow card) 51'; Bajzát 62'; Granát 67'	Stadium: Hidegkuti Nándor Stadion; Attendance: 500; Referee: József Erdős; Assistant referees: T. Vígh, T. Márkus

20 May 2006 28	Győr	2–3	Fehérvár	Győr
18:00 CEST (UTC+2)	Granát 18'; Hanák 36'; Mátyus (yellow card) 67'	Report	Božić 2', 39'; Schwarcz (yellow card) 51'; F. Horváth 83'	Stadium: Stadion ETO; Attendance: 900; Referee: Sándor Gergely; Assistant referees: Z. Kovács, L. Varga II

28 May 2006 29	Győr	2–5	Újpest	Győr
11:30 CEST (UTC+2)	Pusztai (yellow card) 9'; Vincze 40', (yellow card) 44'; Zs. Szabó 52'; Mátyus (yellow card) 54'; G. Varga (yellow card) 76'; Granát (yellow card) 90+1'	Report	Tisza 5'; Rajczi 35', (yellow card) 73'; N. Tóth 54'; Lucas 70', (red card) 90+1'; Vaskó 78'	Stadium: Stadion ETO; Attendance: 4,000; Referee: István Vad; Assistant referees: T. Vámos, T. Vígh

3 June 2006 30	Diósgyőr	1–1	Győr	Miskolc
18:00 CEST (UTC+2)	V. Farkas (yellow card) 43'; Katona 72'	Report	Zs. Szabó 42'	Stadium: Diósgyőri Stadion; Attendance: 4,000; Referee: István Mészáros; Assistant referees: Kispál, V. Tóth

=== Magyar Kupa ===
10 September 2005 Second round	Dorog	2–4	Győr	Dorog
16:00 CEST (UTC+2)	Bedő; Hégli	Report	Kenesei 2x; Bajzát; Priskin; Jäkl (yellow card); Zsók (yellow card)	Stadium: Buzánszky Jenő Stadion; Attendance: 600; Referee: István Vad; Assistant referees: B. Gaál, Vámos

21 September 2005 Third round	Makó	0–0 (4–2 p)	Győr	Makó
15:30 CEST (UTC+2)		Report		Stadium: Erdei Ferenc téri Sporttelep; Attendance: 1,500; Referee: János Medovarszki; Assistant referees: Szpisják, Tóth
	Penalties
	Kazán (penalty scored); Kis (penalty scored); Bány (penalty scored); Turján (penalty scored)		(penalty scored) Kenesei; (penalty scored) Mátyus; (penalty missed) Stark; (penalty missed) Jäkl
Note: Makó won 4–2 on penalties.
