= 2008–09 Paksi FC season =

Paks
2008–09 season
- Manager: Imre Gellei
- Stadium: Fehérvári úti Stadion (Home stadium); Paksi ASE Spottelep (Note: The match against Kaposvár in the Ligakupa was played at the Paksi ASE Spottelep in Paks, instead of Paks regular stadium, the Fehérvári úti Stadion.); Sóstói Stadion (Note: The match against Zalaegerszeg in the Ligakupa was played at the Sóstói Stadion in Székesfehérvár, instead of Paks regular stadium, the Fehérvári úti Stadion in Paks, due to poor pitch conditions caused by unfavorable weather.) (Temporary stadiums)
- Nemzeti Bajnokság I: 11th
- Magyar Kupa: Third round
- Ligakupa: Group stage
- Top goalscorer: League: Attila Tököli (16); All: Attila Tököli (16)
- Highest home attendance: 5,500 v Újpest (9 May 2009, Nemzeti Bajnokság I)
- Lowest home attendance: 50 v Zalaegerszeg (11 February 2009, Ligakupa)
- Average home league attendance: 2,269
- Biggest win: 5–0 v Dunaújváros (Away, 6 December 2008, Ligakupa)
- Biggest defeat: 0–5 v Vasas (Away, 13 September 2008, Nemzeti Bajnokság I)

The 2008–09 season was Paksi Football Club's 3rd competitive season, 3rd consecutive season in the Nemzeti Bajnokság I and 58th season in existence as a football club. In addition to the domestic league, Paks participated in that season's editions of the Magyar Kupa and the Ligakupa.

== Squad ==
Squad at end of season

Note: Flags indicate national team as defined under FIFA eligibility rules; some limited exceptions apply. Players may hold more than one non-FIFA nationality.

No.	Pos.	Nation	Player
1	GK	HUN	Attila Kovács
2	MF	HUN	István Nagy
5	DF	HUN	Péter Pandur
6	MF	HUN	János Zováth
7	MF	HUN	Tamás Báló
8	MF	HUN	Roland Bohner
10	MF	HUN	Tamás Kiss
11	MF	HUN	Attila Pintér
13	MF	HUN	Dániel Böde
15	MF	HUN	Levente Horváth
16	MF	HUN	Tibor Heffler
18	DF	HUN	Attila Fiola
19	MF	HUN	István Mészáros
20	MF	HUN	Attila Buzás

No.	Pos.	Nation	Player
21	FW	HUN	Attila Tököli
22	MF	HUN	István Sipeki
24	FW	HUN	Ádám Weitner
25	MF	HUN	Balázs Nikolov
26	MF	HUN	Gábor Tamási
30	DF	HUN	János Szabó
49	DF	HUN	Sándor Horváth
73	DF	HUN	László Éger
77	GK	HUN	Norbert Csernyánszki
80	FW	HUN	Róbert Rompos
86	GK	HUN	Balázs Csoknyai
87	DF	HUN	Barnabás Vári
89	FW	HUN	Roland Pap
—	GK	HUN	Balázs Bartus

== Competitions ==
=== Overview ===
Competition	First match	Last match	Starting round	Final position	Record							
Competition	First match	Last match	Starting round	Final position	Pld	W	D	L	GF	GA	GD	Win %
Nemzeti Bajnokság I	28 July 2008	30 May 2009	Matchday 1	11th	30	9	8	13	38	51	−13	30.00
Magyar Kupa	3 September 2009	3 September 2009	Third round	Third round	1	0	0	1	0	1	−1	0.00
Ligakupa	1 October 2008	14 February 2009	Group stage	Group stage	10	3	2	5	17	14	+3	30.00
Total					41	12	10	19	55	66	−11	29.27

Source: Competitions

=== Nemzeti Bajnokság I ===
==== League table ====
Pos	Team	Pld	W	D	L	GF	GA	GD	Pts	Qualification or relegation
9	Kaposvár	30	11	7	12	51	46	+5	40	
10	Vasas	30	11	5	14	42	52	−10	38	
11	Paks	30	9	8	13	38	51	−13	35	
12	Diósgyőr	30	9	6	15	29	45	−16	33	
13	Budapest Honvéd	30	8	8	14	31	46	−15	32	Qualification for Europa League third qualifying round (Note: Budapest Honvéd won the 2008–09 Hungarian Cup and thereby qualified for the third qualifying round of the UEFA Europa League.)

Source: soccerway.com
Rules for classification: 1st points; 2nd overall wins; 3rd goal difference; 4th goals scored

==== Results summary ====
Overall								Home						Away					
Pld	W	D	L	GF	GA	GD	Pts	W	D	L	GF	GA	GD	W	D	L	GF	GA	GD
30	9	8	13	38	51	−13	35	4	5	6	17	19	−2	5	3	7	21	32	−11

Source: Hungarian Football Federation

==== Results by round ====
Round	1	2	3	4	5	6	7	8	9	10	11	12	13	14	15	16	17	18	19	20	21	22	23	24	25	26	27	28	29	30
Ground	A	H	A	H	A	H	A	A	H	A	H	A	H	A	H	H	A	H	A	H	A	H	H	A	H	A	H	A	H	A
Result	W	L	W	D	L	D	L	D	W	L	L	L	W	W	L	D	W	D	D	L	L	W	D	L	L	D	W	W	L	L
Position	3	11	3	5	7	9	14	11	10	12	13	13	12	11	14	14	11	12	12	13	13	12	13	13	13	13	12	11	11	11
Points	3	3	6	7	7	8	8	9	12	12	12	12	15	18	18	19	22	23	24	24	24	27	28	28	28	29	32	35	35	35

Source: Matches
A = Away; H = Home; W = Win; D = Draw; L = Loss

==== Matches ====
28 July 2008 1	Kecskemét	1–2	Paks	Kecskemét
20:00 CET (UTC+1)	Csordás 16' (pen.); Koszó (yellow card) 37'; Čukić (yellow card) 40'	Report	Tököli 3', 90'; Kriston (yellow card) 4'; Báló (yellow card) 31'	Stadium: Széktói Stadion; Attendance: 6,000; Referee: Péter Solymosi; Assistant referees: Gábor Takács, Tibor Vígh; Fourth official: Ferenc Szöllősi

2 August 2008 2	Paks	1–3	Rákospalota	Paks
20:53 CEST (UTC+2)	S. Horváth (yellow card) 72'; Tököli 78'	Report	Lisztes 5', (yellow card) 49'; Nyerges 17', 81'; Erős (yellow card) 88'; Rása (yellow card) 90'	Stadium: Fehérvári úti Stadion; Attendance: 3,000; Referee: Roland Veizer; Assistant referees: Péter Berettyán, Lajos L. Tóth; Fourth official: János Takács
Note: The match, scheduled to start at 20:00, ultimately began at 20:53 due to a malfunction in the stadium’s lighting system.

9 August 2008 3	Kaposvár	3–5	Paks	Kaposvár
20:00 CEST (UTC+2)	Graszl (yellow card) 18'; Zahorecz 30' (pen.), 51' (pen.); K. Farkas 75'	Report	Báló 7', 15', (yellow card) 45'; T. Kiss I 32'; Tököli 41'; Salamon (yellow card) 50'; Csehi 76'	Stadium: Rákóczi Stadion; Attendance: 2,500; Referee: Sándor Andó-Szabó; Assistant referees: Balázs Farkas, Zsolt Butkai; Fourth official: Csaba Molnár

16 August 2008 4	Paks	1–1	Honvéd	Paks
20:00 CEST (UTC+2)	Sipeki (yellow card) 20'; Tököli 28' (pen.); Böde (yellow card) 52'; Vári (yellow card) 84'	Report	Rigonato (yellow card) 34'; Vincze (yellow card) 59'; Ivancsics (yellow card) 70'; Hercegfalvi 73' (pen.)	Stadium: Fehérvári úti Stadion; Attendance: 3,000; Referee: Tamás Arany; Assistant referees: Attila Forgács, Balázs Huszár; Fourth official: Csaba Pintér

23 August 2008 5	MTK	3–2	Paks	Budapest
20:00 CEST (UTC+2)	Pál 23', 90'; Kecskés (yellow card) 56'; Radulović (yellow card) 68'; Lencse 86'	Report	Tököli 28'; Vári (yellow card) 40'; T. Kiss I 81'	Stadium: Hidegkuti Nándor Stadion; Attendance: 1,000; Referee: Ferenc Bede; Assistant referees: Dr. Zsolt Varga, Gyula Ortó; Fourth official: Ádám Radványi

30 August 2008 6	Paks	1–1	Diósgyőr	Paks
20:00 CEST (UTC+2)	Tököli 18'; Z. Molnár (yellow card) 33'; Báló (yellow card) 82'	Report	Kamber (yellow card) 18', (goal) 24'; Búrány (yellow card) 61'; Gohér (red card) 62'; Z. Pintér (yellow card) 75'; P. Takács (yellow card) 90'	Stadium: Fehérvári úti Stadion; Attendance: 2,500; Referee: Zsolt Szabó; Assistant referees: Róbert Kispál, Gábor Kormányos II; Fourth official: Gábor Fajkusz

13 September 2008 7	Vasas	5–0	Paks	Budapest
20:00 CEST (UTC+2)	A. Tóth (red card) 3'; Dobrić 24'; N. Németh 47'; Divić 65', 70'; B. Tóth (yellow card) 76'; Gyánó 82', (yellow card) 83'	Report	Vári (yellow card) 19'; Éger (yellow card) 47'; Z. Molnár (red card) 60'	Stadium: Illovszky Rudolf Stadion; Attendance: 1,500; Referee: Mihály Fábián; Assistant referees: Dr. Zsolt Varga, Zoltán Pápai; Fourth official: Ádám Radványi

20 September 2008 8	Zalaegerszeg	1–1	Paks	Zalaegerszeg
19:00 CEST (UTC+2)	Kriston 74' (o.g.)	Report	Tököli 61'	Stadium: ZTE Arena; Attendance: 1,652; Referee: Szabolcs Szilasi; Assistant referees: Oszkár Lémon, Imre Attila Nagy; Fourth official: Balázs Böcskei

27 September 2008 9	Paks	2–1	Győr	Paks
19:00 CEST (UTC+2)	Éger 58' (pen.), 90' (pen.); Kriston (yellow card) 77'	Report	Józsi 8'; Völgyi (yellow card) 58'	Stadium: Fehérvári úti Stadion; Attendance: 3,500; Referee: Tamás Arany; Assistant referees: Szabolcs Deutsch, Arnold Kepe; Fourth official: Dániel Becséri

4 October 2008 10	Fehérvár	4–1	Paks	Székesfehérvár
18:00 CEST (UTC+2)	Vujović 29', 65'; Sitku 61'; T. Kulcsár 90+3'	Report	T. Kiss I 7', (yellow card) 78'; Hanák (yellow card) 27'; Sipeki (yellow card) 45'; Böde (yellow card) 90'	Stadium: Sóstói Stadion; Attendance: 1,510; Referee: Viktor Kassai; Assistant referees: Gábor Erős, Balázs Farkas; Fourth official: Péter Tamási

18 October 2008 11	Paks	1–2	Nyíregyháza	Paks
18:00 CEST (UTC+2)	Kriston 36'; Pandur (yellow card) 45'; Éger (red card) 90'; Tamási (yellow card) 90+3'	Report	Bárányos 23', 90+5'; Shevel (yellow card) 45'; Perenyi (yellow card) 56'; Zabos (yellow card) 90'; Odrobéna (red card) 90+4'	Stadium: Fehérvári úti Stadion; Attendance: 2,000; Referee: Péter Solymosi; Assistant referees: Oszkár Lémon, István Iványi; Fourth official: Dávid Ákos

26 October 2008 12	Újpest	3–1	Paks	Budapest
17:30 CET (UTC+1)	Božić (yellow card) 3'; Kabát (yellow card) 23', (goal) 55', 89'; Korcsmár 82'	Report	Böde (yellow card) 26'; Kriston (yellow card) 34'; T. Kiss I 52'	Stadium: Szusza Ferenc Stadion; Attendance: 4,355; Referee: Tamás Bognár; Assistant referees: Dr. Zsolt Varga, Zoltán Pápai; Fourth official: Róbert Nagy

1 November 2008 13	Paks	2–1	Siófok	Paks
18:00 CET (UTC+1)	Böde (yellow card) 15', (goal) 56'; Hanák (yellow card) 20'; T. Kiss I 54'	Report	Tusori (yellow card) 13'; S. Kanta 36'; G. Hegedűs (yellow card) 63'; Magasföldi (yellow card) 81'; G. Horváth I (yellow card) 90'	Stadium: Fehérvári úti Stadion; Attendance: 1,200; Referee: Ferenc Bede; Assistant referees: Róbert Kispál, Zsolt Butkai; Fourth official: Dr. Ádám Szanyi

8 November 2008 14	Haladás	0–1	Paks	Szombathely
18:00 CET (UTC+1)	B. Molnár (yellow card) 81'	Report	Tököli 4', (yellow card) 75'; Heffler (yellow card) 18'; Pandur (yellow card) 35'	Stadium: Rohonci út Attendance: 5,500; Referee: Gergely Sulyok; Assistant referees: Vencel Tóth II, Arnold Kepe; Fourth official: Balázs Berke

14 November 2008 15	Paks	0–2	Debrecen	Paks
19:00 CET (UTC+1)	Pandur (yellow card) 38'	Report	Rudolf 20'; P. Szakály 39'; Komlósi (yellow card) 49'	Stadium: Fehérvári úti Stadion; Attendance: 1,500; Referee: Viktor Kassai; Assistant referees: Gábor Erős, Dr. Péter Hegyi; Fourth official: Péter Tamási

21 February 2009 16	Paks	2–2	Kecskemét	Paks
17:00 CET (UTC+1)	Tököli 38'; Sipeki (yellow card) 60'; Böde (yellow card) 79'; S. Horváth (yellow card) 82'; Báló 86', (yellow card) 86'	Report	Mbengono 39'; Csordás 42' (pen.); Gyagya (red card) 47'; Z. Tóth II (yellow card) 90+2'	Stadium: Fehérvári úti Stadion; Attendance: 1,351; Referee: Sándor Andó-Szabó; Assistant referees: Zsolt Butkai, Zoltán Szalai; Fourth official: Tibor Gyarmati II

7 March 2009 18	Paks	0–0	Kaposvár	Paks
18:00 CET (UTC+1)	Zováth (yellow card) 36'	Report	Petrók (yellow card) 44'; D. Hegedűs (yellow card) 60'; Zo. Kovács I (yellow card) 84'	Stadium: Fehérvári úti Stadion; Attendance: 800; Referee: János Takács; Assistant referees: Lajos L. Tóth, István Iványi; Fourth official: Gábor Bendik

14 March 2009 19	Honvéd	1–1	Paks	Budapest
18:00 CET (UTC+1)	Arsenijević (yellow card) 41'; Hidi 64', (yellow card) 80'; Dobos (yellow card) 88'	Report	J. Szabó (yellow card) 30'; Nikolov (yellow card) 32'; Tököli 90+2'	Stadium: Bozsik József Stadion; Attendance: 1,200; Referee: Péter Solymosi; Assistant referees: Gábor Takács, Balázs Huszár; Fourth official: Gábor Péter Kovács

21 March 2009 20	Paks	0–1	MTK	Paks
18:00 CET (UTC+1)	J. Szabó (yellow card) 17'; Nikolov (yellow card) 75'	Report	Zsidai (yellow card) 50'; Pátkai (yellow card) 87'; J. Kanta 90'	Stadium: Fehérvári úti Stadion; Attendance: 1,500; Referee: József Berger; Assistant referees: Attila Forgács, Gábor Kormányos II; Fourth official: Gábor Fajkusz

4 April 2009 21	Diósgyőr	1–0	Paks	Miskolc
19:00 CEST (UTC+2)	Kamber (yellow card) 14'; P. Takács (yellow card) 29'; M. Tóth 78'; Stanić (yellow card) 81'	Report	Zováth (yellow card) 15'; A. Pintér (yellow card) 76'; Tököli (yellow card) 80'	Stadium: Diósgyőri Stadion; Attendance: 3,500; Referee: Roland Veizer; Assistant referees: Zoltán Szalai, Róbert Horváth; Fourth official: Tibor Gyarmati II

11 April 2009 22	Paks	3–0	Vasas	Paks
19:00 CEST (UTC+2)	J. Szabó (yellow card) 8'; Böde (yellow card) 26'; Tököli 40', 65'; T. Kiss I 47'; Le. Horváth (yellow card) 50'	Report	Laczkó (yellow card) 22'; Vujović (yellow card) 40'; Orosz (yellow card) 58'	Stadium: Fehérvári úti Stadion; Attendance: 2,187; Referee: Zoltán Iványi; Assistant referees: István Albert, Gábor Kormányos II; Fourth official: Gábor Fajkusz

18 April 2009 23	Paks	1–1	Zalaegerszeg	Paks
19:00 CEST (UTC+2)	Tököli (yellow card) 54', (goal) 65' (pen.)	Report	Hajdú (yellow card) 20'; Balázs 53'; Botiș (yellow card) 65'; P. Máté I (yellow card) 68'; R. Varga (yellow card) 76'	Stadium: Fehérvári úti Stadion; Attendance: 2,000; Referee: Ádám Németh; Assistant referees: Zsolt Butkai, Zsolt Márton; Fourth official: József Erdős

25 April 2009 24	Győr	4–1	Paks	Győr
19:00 CEST (UTC+2)	Kink 26'; Brnović 36'; Bajzát 43', 49'; Stanišić (red card) 58'; Dorogi (yellow card) 60'	Report	Zováth (yellow card) 27'; A. Pintér 33'; Böde (yellow card) 39'; Pandur (yellow card) 48'; J. Szabó (yellow card) 87'	Stadium: ETO Park; Attendance: 2,000; Referee: József Berger; Assistant referees: Attila Forgács, Zoltán Kovács; Fourth official: Krisztián Király

28 April 2009 25	Paks	0–1	Fehérvár	Paks
19:00 CEST (UTC+2)	Éger (penalty missed) 50'; A. Pintér (yellow card) 79'	Report	D. Nagy (yellow card) 50'; Alves 67'	Stadium: Fehérvári úti Stadion; Attendance: 1,000; Referee: Péter Solymosi; Assistant referees: Oszkár Lémon, Gábor Takács; Fourth official: Dávid Ákos

1 May 2009 26	Nyíregyháza	2–2	Paks	Nyíregyháza
19:00 CEST (UTC+2)	Lăzăreanu (yellow card) 52'; Imedashvili (yellow card) 65'; Miskolczi 82'; Fekete 86'	Report	Heffler (yellow card) 14'; Tököli 53', 71'; Nikolov (yellow card) 82'	Stadium: Városi Stadion; Attendance: 2,000; Referee: Szabolcs Szilasi; Assistant referees: Balázs Farkas, Zoltán Szalai; Fourth official: Gábor Oláh

6 May 2009 17	Rákospalota	1–2	Paks	Budapest
19:00 CEST (UTC+2)	Nyerges 24'; Pomper (yellow card) 61'	Report	T. Kiss I 6'; A. Pintér (yellow card) 22'; J. Szabó 40'; Böde (yellow card) 87'	Stadium: Budai II. László Stadion; Attendance: 300; Referee: Roland Veizer; Assistant referees: Péter Berettyán, Róbert Horváth; Fourth official: Gergő Király
Note: The matches of the 17th round were postponed due to HFF decision.

9 May 2009 27	Paks	3–1	Újpest	Paks
19:00 CEST (UTC+2)	Éger 49', (yellow card) 50'; Le. Horváth 55'; Tököli (yellow card) 76'; Vári 90+1'	Report	Tisza 12'; Korcsmár (yellow card) 43'; Malone (yellow card) 72'; Dudić (yellow card) 76'; Kabát (red card) 79'	Stadium: Fehérvári úti Stadion; Attendance: 5,500; Referee: Tamás Arany; Assistant referees: Tibor Vámos, Zsolt Butkai; Fourth official: J. Zoltán Kovács

16 May 2009 28	Siófok	1–2	Paks	Siófok
19:00 CEST (UTC+2)	G. Hegedűs (red card) 51'; Tusori 56'	Report	Vári 5', (yellow card) 28'; Le. Horváth (yellow card) 25'; Nikolov (red card) 70'; I. Nagy 83'	Stadium: Révész Géza utcai Stadion; Attendance: 800; Referee: Ferenc Bede; Assistant referees: Róbert Kispál, Vencel Tóth II; Fourth official: József Erdős

23 May 2009 29	Paks	0–2	Haladás	Paks
19:00 CEST (UTC+2)	Zováth (yellow card) 47'; J. Szabó (yellow card) 86'	Report	Kenesei (yellow card) 44', (goal) 47'; Oross 56'; Rózsa (yellow card) 68'	Stadium: Fehérvári úti Stadion; Attendance: 3,000; Referee: Zoltán Iványi; Assistant referees: Zsolt Szpisják, István Albert; Fourth official: Gábor Oláh

30 May 2009 30	Debrecen	2–0	Paks	Debrecen
15:00 CEST (UTC+2)	Poleksić 45' (pen.); Rudolf 69' (pen.)	Report	Zováth (yellow card) 24'; Böde (yellow card) 64'; Tamási (yellow card) 71'	Stadium: Oláh Gábor utcai Stadion; Attendance: 6,000; Referee: Sándor Andó-Szabó; Assistant referees: Balázs Farkas, Tibor Vígh; Fourth official: Tibor Gyarmati II

=== Magyar Kupa ===
3 September 2009 Third round	Kozármisleny	1–0	Paks	Kozármisleny
15:30 CEST (UTC+2)	I. Tóth 32'	Report	Z. Molnár (yellow card) 31'; Tamási (yellow card) 53'; Buzás (yellow card) 90'	Stadium: Alkotmány tér Attendance: 500; Referee: József Berger; Assistant referees: Attila Forgács, László Sebestyén

=== Ligakupa ===
==== Group stage ====
Pos	Team	Pld	W	D	L	GF	GA	GD	Pts	Qualification	UJP	PEC	KAP	ZAL	PAK	DUN
1	Újpest	10	6	2	2	25	15	+10	20	Advance to knockout phase	—	4–0	2–4	2–1	0–0	5–1
2	Pécs	10	6	2	2	24	14	+10	20	Advance to knockout phase	1–1	—	2–4	2–0	3–1	3–1
3	Kaposvár	10	6	1	3	26	20	+6	19		2–4	1–4	—	1–0	2–1	2–2
4	Zalaegerszeg	10	4	1	5	15	15	0	13		2–3	0–0	0–5	—	3–1	5–0
5	Paks	10	3	2	5	17	14	+3	11		3–1	0–1	4–0	0–2	—	2–2
6	Dunaújváros	10	0	2	8	11	40	−29	2		1–3	2–8	1–5	1–2	0–5	—

Source: HFF

1 October 2008 1	Paks	0–1	Pécs	Paks
14:30 CEST (UTC+2)	Weitner (yellow card) 25'; Mészáros (yellow card) 30'; Vári (yellow card) 63'; Z. Molnár (red card) 85'	Report	Lovrencsics 63'	Stadium: Fehérvári úti Stadion; Attendance: 150; Referee: Gergely Sulyok; Assistant referees: Róbert Kispál, György Ring

14 October 2008 2	Újpest	0–0	Paks	Budapest
19:00 CEST (UTC+2)	Szekér (yellow card) 57'	Report		Stadium: Szusza Ferenc Stadion; Attendance: 600; Referee: László Varga; Assistant referees: István Tóth, János Demeter

29 October 2008 3	Paks	2–2	Dunaújváros	Paks
13:30 CET (UTC+1)	J. Szabó (yellow card) 41'; Márkus 48'; Böde (yellow card) 86'; Vári (yellow card) 90'; Tamási 90+2'	Report	Frőhlich 12'; Micskó 20'; A. Nagy (yellow card) 25'; Rátkai (yellow card) 62'; Facskó (yellow card) 68'	Stadium: Fehérvári úti Stadion; Attendance: 120; Referee: Gábor Fajkusz; Assistant referees: Dr. Péter Hegyi, Gábor Kormányos II

5 November 2008 4	Zalaegerszeg	3–1	Paks	Zalaegerszeg
14:00 CET (UTC+1)	Alomerović 27', 44'; T. Balogh (yellow card) 62'; An. Horváth I 83'	Report	Pákai 84'	Stadium: ZTE Arena; Attendance: 400; Referee: Tamás Arany; Assistant referees: Dr. Péter Kovács, Roland Schuszter

12 November 2008 5	Paks	4–0	Kaposvár	Paks
13:00 CET (UTC+1)	J. Szabó 32'; Mészáros (yellow card) 40'; Tamási 45'; Márkus 47'; Weitner (yellow card) 85'; Buzás 90'	Report	Jovánczai (yellow card) 25'; L. Balogh (yellow card) 28'; Lá. Horváth (yellow card) 89'	Stadium: Paksi ASE Spottelep; Attendance: 120; Referee: Gábor Oláh; Assistant referees: Gergő Janitz, Ferenc Varga

22 November 2008 6	Pécs	3–1	Paks	Pécs
13:00 CET (UTC+1)	Berdó 63'; Wittrédi 81' (pen.); Megyesi (yellow card) 86'; Z. Horváth 90'	Report	Tamási 43'; J. Szabó (yellow card) 57'; Vári (yellow card) 59'; Böde (yellow card) 64'; Pandur (yellow card) 80'; Buzás (yellow card) 87'	Stadium: Stadion PMFC; Attendance: 250; Referee: József Berger; Assistant referees: Attila Forgács, Gábor Kormányos II

29 November 2008 7	Paks	3–1	Újpest	Paks
15:00 CET (UTC+1)	Vári (yellow card) 6'; S. Horváth (yellow card) 45'; T. Kiss I 47', 90'; Heffler 76'	Report	Kéthévoama 25', (yellow card) 45'; Üveges (yellow card) 58'	Stadium: Fehérvári úti Stadion; Attendance: 150; Referee: Tamás Arany; Assistant referees: Imre Attila Nagy, Petz Brigitta Makkosné

6 December 2008 8	Dunaújváros	0–5	Paks	Dunaújváros
13:00 CET (UTC+1)	Facskó (yellow card) 54'; G. Szabó (yellow card) 80'	Report	Vári (yellow card) 19'; Pandur (yellow card) 31'; Heffler 48'; Buzás 55', 58' (pen.); Tamási (yellow card) 76'; Pap 86'; Márkus 89'	Stadium: Dunaújvárosi Stadion; Attendance: 100; Referee: Balázs Bcskei; Assistant referees: Dr. Péter Kovács, István Iványi

11 February 2009 9	Paks	0–2	Zalaegerszeg	Székesfehérvár
13:00 CET (UTC+1)		Report	Alomerović 31'; Pavićević 75'	Stadium: Sóstói Stadion; Attendance: 50; Referee: Szabolcs Szilasi; Assistant referees: László Viszokai, István Iványi

14 February 2009 10	Kaposvár	2–1	Paks	Kaposvár (Note: The match was played at the Cseri út in Kaposvár, instead of Kaposvár regular stadium, the Rákóczi Stadion.)
13:00 CET (UTC+1)	Nikolić 18', 34'; P. Pintér (yellow card) 28'	Report	Nikolov (red card) 21'; A. Pintér 29'; T. Kiss I (yellow card) 38'; Heffler (yellow card) 45'; S. Horváth (yellow card) 61'	Stadium: Cseri út Attendance: 100; Referee: István Vad; Assistant referees: Balázs Farkas, Arnold Kepe

== Statistics ==
=== Overall ===
Appearances (Apps) numbers are for appearances in competitive games only, including sub appearances.
Source: Competitions

No.	Player	Pos.	Nemzeti Bajnokság I				Magyar Kupa				Ligakupa				Total			
No.	Player	Pos.	Apps	Goal	Yellow card	Red card	Apps	Goal	Yellow card	Red card	Apps	Goal	Yellow card	Red card	Apps	Goal	Yellow card	Red card
1	(Hungary) Attila Kovács	GK	17								3				20			
2	(Hungary) Zoltán Molnár	DF	2		1	1	1		1		1			1	4		2	2
2	(Hungary) István Nagy	MF	5	1											5	1		
2	(Hungary) Gergő Pákai	MF									1	1			1	1		
2	(Hungary) István Vituska	MF									1				1			
3	(Hungary) Miklós Salamon	DF	11		1		1				4				16		1	
5	(Hungary) Péter Pandur	DF	12		4						4		2		16		6	
6	(Hungary) János Zováth	MF	18		5						4				22		5	
7	(Hungary) Tamás Báló	MF	20	3	4		1				5				26	3	4	
8	(Hungary) Roland Bohner	MF	1								5				6			
9	(Hungary) Tamás Csehi	DF	8	1							3				11	1		
10	(Hungary) Tamás Kiss	MF	30	7	1		1				4	2	1		35	9	2	
11	(Hungary) László Koch	N/A									2				2			
11	(Hungary) Attila Pintér	MF	14	1	3						2	1			16	2	3	
13	(Hungary) Dániel Böde	MF	29	1	9		1				6		2		36	1	11	
14	(Hungary) Viktor Hanák	DF	15		2		1				1				17		2	
15	(Hungary) Attila Cziráki	MF									3				3			
15	(Hungary) Levente Horváth	MF	13	1	2						2				15	1	2	
16	(Hungary) Tibor Heffler	MF	30		2						5	2	1		35	2	3	
18	(Hungary) Attila Fiola	DF	3								3				6			
18	(Hungary) Tibor Márkus	FW	5								8	3			13	3		
19	(Hungary) István Mészáros	MF									9		2		9		2	
20	(Hungary) Attila Buzás	MF	9				1		1		7	3	1		17	3	2	
21	(Hungary) Attila Tököli	FW	27	16	4		1				1				29	16	4	
22	(Hungary) István Sipeki	MF	28		3		1				3				32		3	
23	(Hungary) Dávid Féhr	DF									3				3			
24	(Hungary) Ádám Weitner	FW	4				1				6		2		11		2	
25	(Hungary) Balázs Nikolov	MF	12		3	1					2			1	14		3	2
26	(Hungary) Gábor Tamási	MF	10		2		1		1		9	3	1		20	3	4	
27	(Hungary) Ádám Berkó	DF									2				2			
27	(Hungary) Attila Kriston	MF	8	1	3										8	1	3	
28	(Hungary) Péter Pokorni	GK	2				1				4				7			
30	(Hungary) János Szabó	DF	13	1	5						10	1	2		23	2	7	
49	(Hungary) Sándor Horváth	DF	12		2						5		2		17		4	
68	(Hungary) László Varga	FW																
73	(Hungary) László Éger	DF	25	3	2	1	1				3				29	3	2	1
77	(Hungary) Norbert Csernyánszki	GK	11								2				13			
80	(Hungary) Róbert Rompos	FW									2				2			
86	(Hungary) Balázs Csoknyai	GK									1				1			
87	(Hungary) Barnabás Vári	DF	20	2	4		1				7		5		28	2	9	
89	(Hungary) Dávid Mondovics	N/A																
89	(Hungary) Roland Pap	FW	3								7	1			10	1		
Own goals																		
Totals				38	62	3			3			17	21	2		55	86	5

=== Clean sheets ===
			Clean sheets			
No.	Player	Games Played	Nemzeti Bajnokság I	Magyar Kupa	Ligakupa	Total
1	(Hungary) Attila Kovács	20	1		2	3
77	(Hungary) Norbert Csernyánszki	13	2			2
86	(Hungary) Balázs Csoknyai	1			1	1
28	(Hungary) Péter Pokorni	7				
Totals			3		3	6
