= 2005–06 Magyar Kupa =

Tournament details
- Country: Hungary

Final positions
- Champions: Videoton (1st title)
- Runners-up: Vasas

The 2005–06 Magyar Kupa (English: Hungarian Cup) was the 66th season of Hungary's annual knock-out cup football competition.

== Quarter-finals ==
The first legs were played on March 15 and 22, 2006, while the second legs were played on March 22, 29 and April 5.

Team 1	Agg.	Team 2	1st leg	2nd leg
Pécs	0–2	Vasas	0–1	0–1
Kaposvár	2–5	Videoton	1–2	1–3
Újpest	0–3	Debrecen	0–1	0–2
Sopron	0–1	Budapest Honvéd	0–0	0–1

== Semi-finals ==
The first legs were played on April 25 and 26, 2006, while the second legs were played on May 2 and 3.

Team 1	Agg.	Team 2	1st leg	2nd leg
Debrecen	2–3	Videoton	0–1	2–2
Budapest Honvéd	2–3	Vasas	1–3	1–0

== Final ==
17 May 2006
20:00 (UTC+2)

Vasas	2–2	Videoton
Waltner 25'; Balogh 84'	Report	Sitku 46'; Schwarcz 57'
Penalties
Bárányos (penalty scored); Csordás (penalty scored); Gyánó (penalty scored); Janjić (penalty scored); Tóth (penalty scored); Zováth (penalty scored); Molnár (penalty missed)	5–6	(penalty scored) Sitku; (penalty scored) Horváth; (penalty scored) Koller; (penalty scored) Dajić; (penalty scored) Csizmadia; (penalty scored) Kuttor; (penalty scored) Božić

Üllői úti stadion, Budapest
Attendance: 6,000
Referee: János Megyebíró (Hungary)

== See also ==
- 2005–06 Nemzeti Bajnokság I
- 2005–06 Nemzeti Bajnokság II
- 2005–06 Nemzeti Bajnokság III
