= Péter Antal =

Hungarian football manager and player (born 1948)

Personal information
- Date of birth: 3 December 1948 (age 77)
- Place of birth: Budapest, Second Hungarian Republic
- Position: Midfielder

Youth career
- 1960–: Vasas

Senior career*
Years	Team	Apps	(Gls)
–1972	Vasas		
1972–1976	SZEOL		
1976–1980	Vasas Izzó		

Managerial career
- 1985–1986: Vasas (assistant)
- 1986–1987: Ganz-MÁVAG
- 1988–1989: Építők
- 1992–1993: Al-Tadamon
- 1993: Szeged
- 1994–1996: Rákospalota
- 1996: Dreher Sörgyár
- 1997–2012: Vasas (team manager)
- 2002: Vasas (caretaker)
- 2005: Vasas (caretaker)
- * Club domestic league appearances and goals

Péter Antal (born 3 December 1948) is a Hungarian former professional football manager and player who played as a midfielder.

== Club career ==
Antal was born in Budapest and joined the youth academy of Vasas in 1960. He was promoted to the first team at the age of 18 and made his top-flight debut on 26 May 1968 in a 2–0 victory over MTK. He was a member of the Vasas sides that won bronze medals in the 1968 and 1970–71 Nemzeti Bajnokság I seasons. Between 1972 and 1976, he played for SZEOL before spending the final three years of his playing career with Vasas Izzó from 1976 to 1979. Over the course of his top-flight career, he made 120 league appearances and scored 23 goals.

== Managerial career ==
Antal served as Vasas' team manager from 1997 until 2012.

Following the departure of manager Sándor Egervári by mutual agreement on 5 December 2005, Antal was appointed caretaker manager for Vasas' final league match of the autumn season against MTK. Following the match, Attila Pintér was appointed as the club's manager on 20 December, succeeding Antal.

== Managerial statistics ==
Managerial record by team and tenure
Team	From	To	Record								Ref
Team	From	To	P	W	D	L	GF	GA	GD	Win %	Ref
Szeged	July 1993	October 1993	10	2	1	7	11	20	−9	20.00	
Rákospalota	July 1994	June 1996	60	39	12	9	132	46	+86	65.00	
Dreher Sörgyár	August 1996	November 1996	15	4	3	8	18	34	−16	26.67	
Vasas (caretaker)	22 November 2002	November 2002	2	1	0	1	2	2	+0	50.00	
Vasas (caretaker)	5 December 2005	20 December 2005	1	0	0	1	0	3	−3	0.00	
Total			88	46	16	26	163	105	+58	52.27	
