= 2005–06 Nemzeti Bajnokság I =

Nemzeti Bajnokság I
- Season: 2005–06
- Dates: 30 July 2005 – 3 June 2006
- Champions: Debrecen
- Relegated: Lombard Pápa; Ferencváros
- Champions League: Debrecen
- UEFA Cup: Újpest; Videoton
- Intertoto Cup: Sopron
- Matches: 240
- Goals: 707 (2.95 per match)
- Top goalscorer: Péter Rajczi (23)
- Biggest home win: MTK 7–0 Lombard Pápa; Újpest 7–0 Honvéd
- Biggest away win: Lombard Pápa 0–5 Tatabánya
- Highest scoring: MTK 6–3 Zalaegerszeg

The 2005–06 Nemzeti Bajnokság I, also known as NB I, was the 104th season of top-tier football in Hungary. The league was officially named Borsodi Liga for sponsoring reasons. The season started on 30 July 2005 and ended on 2 June 2006.

Debreceni VSC successfully defended their championship, and became the first hungarian club in the 21st century to win back-to-back league-titles. DVSC didn't lose a single game during the first half of the season, and went unbeaten at home for the entire campaign. One of their only two losses that season came against Újpest. UTE and DVSC were joint on points going in to the last day of the season. Debrecen defeated, and in the process relegated Lombard Pápa, while Újpest suffered their only home loss of the season against Fehérvár, who themselves finished 3rd. The club from the capital came within inches of the title, but had to watch as it slipped through their fingers again.

Ferencvárosi TC did not receive a 1st Division license due to monetary predicaments, and were relegated from the top-flight for the first time in their over century-long history.

== League standings ==
Pos	Team	Pld	W	D	L	GF	GA	GD	Pts	Qualification or relegation
1	Debrecen (C)	30	20	8	2	69	34	+35	68	Qualification for Champions League second qualifying round
2	Újpest	30	20	5	5	74	37	+37	65	Qualification for UEFA Cup first qualifying round (Note: Videoton FC Fehérvár won the 2005–06 Hungarian Cup and thereby qualified for the first qualifying round of the UEFA Cup.)
3	Fehérvár	30	19	7	4	52	24	+28	64	Qualification for UEFA Cup first qualifying round
4	MTK	30	18	6	6	65	33	+32	60	
5	Tatabánya	30	11	8	11	46	45	+1	41	
6	Ferencváros (R)	30	10	11	9	43	38	+5	41	Relegated to Nemzeti Bajnokság II (Note: Ferencvárosi TC were relegated to the Nemzeti Bajnokság II because the club failed to comply with UEFA licensing rules.)
7	Kaposvár	30	10	7	13	35	41	−6	37	
8	Diósgyőr	30	10	7	13	33	44	−11	37	
9	Győr	30	9	9	12	47	50	−3	36	
10	Sopron	30	9	8	13	39	39	0	35	Qualification for Intertoto Cup second round
11	Zalaegerszeg	30	9	8	13	42	47	−5	35	
12	Pécs	30	8	9	13	37	41	−4	33	
13	Honvéd	30	8	9	13	33	52	−19	33	
14	Rákospalota	30	7	5	18	30	59	−29	26	
15	Vasas	30	5	10	15	32	47	−15	25	
16	Pápa (R)	30	5	7	18	30	76	−46	22	Relegated to Nemzeti Bajnokság II

Source: RSSSF
(C) Champions; (R) Relegated

== Results ==
Home \ Away	HON	DEB	DIÓ	FEH	FTC	GYŐ	KAP	PÁP	MTK	PÉC	RÁK	SOP	TAT	UTE	VAS	ZTE
Budapest Honvéd		0–1	0–1	1–1	3–1	3–2	0–2	1–0	2–2	1–1	1–3	0–3	1–3	1–0	2–2	4–0
Debrecen	6–1		2–0	2–0	3–1	1–1	2–1	4–1	2–2	3–1	6–1	3–1	1–0	2–2	2–2	2–1
Diósgyőr	1–0	3–3		1–0	0–1	1–1	5–2	0–1	0–0	0–0	1–1	1–1	1–0	0–1	0–2	3–0
Fehérvár	3–0	1–2	5–0		1–1	2–2	3–0	2–1	1–0	1–0	3–1	2–2	4–1	1–1	1–0	1–0
Ferencváros	3–1	0–0	1–1	0–1		2–0	1–1	3–3	1–0	3–1	0–2	1–0	2–3	1–2	3–1	2–2
Győr	1–2	1–2	1–2	2–3	1–1		4–0	4–0	1–3	1–1	2–2	2–1	0–0	2–5	2–1	2–1
Kaposvár	0–0	1–2	1–3	3–0	0–0	1–0		1–0	1–3	2–2	1–0	2–0	1–1	1–2	4–1	1–1
Lombard Pápa	2–2	3–3	1–3	0–2	1–5	1–4	0–0		1–3	3–1	1–3	1–2	0–5	2–1	1–0	2–1
MTK Budapest	0–0	2–4	4–0	0–1	2–2	5–2	2–1	7–0		2–0	1–0	2–0	1–0	0–2	3–0	6–3
Pécs	1–0	0–2	5–0	0–2	0–0	0–1	2–1	5–0	2–2		4–0	2–1	0–1	2–0	0–0	0–0
Rákospalota	1–3	1–2	0–2	1–2	1–0	1–2	0–3	2–2	1–2	1–1		1–0	0–2	2–3	0–3	2–1
Sopron	1–1	0–2	2–1	1–1	1–1	2–0	2–0	2–0	0–3	3–1	0–1		5–1	1–1	2–0	0–1
Tatabánya	3–1	3–3	2–1	0–1	2–3	3–3	1–0	1–1	0–1	2–0	4–0	3–2		1–1	2–2	0–1
Újpest	7–0	2–1	3–2	1–3	2–1	3–1	4–1	3–1	1–2	5–1	2–0	2–1	5–1		2–2	5–1
Vasas	1–2	0–1	2–0	0–3	0–1	1–2	0–2	1–1	2–1	3–0	2–2	1–1	1–1	2–3		0–0
Zalaegerszeg	0–0	2–0	2–0	1–1	3–2	0–0	0–1	5–0	3–4	1–4	3–0	2–2	3–0	1–3	3–0	

Source: soccerway.com
Legend: Blue = home team win; Yellow = draw; Red = away team win.

== Statistical leaders ==
=== Top goalscorers ===
Rank	Scorer	Club	Goals
1	(Hungary) Péter Rajczi	Újpest FC	23
2	(Hungary) Tibor Márkus	FC Tatabánya	19
3	(Senegal) Ibrahim Sidibe	Debreceni VSC	16
4	(Hungary) Illés Sitku	Videoton FC	14
5	(Hungary) Ádám Hrepka	MTK Budapest FC	12
6	(Brazil) André Alves	Kaposvári Rákóczi	11
6	(Serbia and Montenegro) Bojan Brnović	Debreceni VSC	11
6	(Hungary) József Kanta	MTK Budapest FC	11
6	(Hungary) Szabolcs Gyánó	Vasas SC	11
6	(Slovakia) Tamás Priskin	Győri ETO FC	11
6	(Hungary) Zoltán Jovánczai	Ferencvárosi TC	11

== Attendances ==
#	Club	Average
1	Debrecen	7,267
2	Újpest	5,335
3	Videoton	4,528
4	Diósgyőr	4,433
5	Ferencváros	4,341
6	Zalaegerszeg	3,280
7	Sopron	2,767
8	Tatabánya	2,613
9	Kaposvár	2,547
10	Vasas	2,253
11	Budapest Honvéd	2,047
12	Rákospalota	2,000
13	Pécs	1,873
14	Győr	1,790
15	Lombard Pápa	1,613
16	MTK	1,283
