= István Mészáros (footballer, born 1980) =

Hungarian footballer

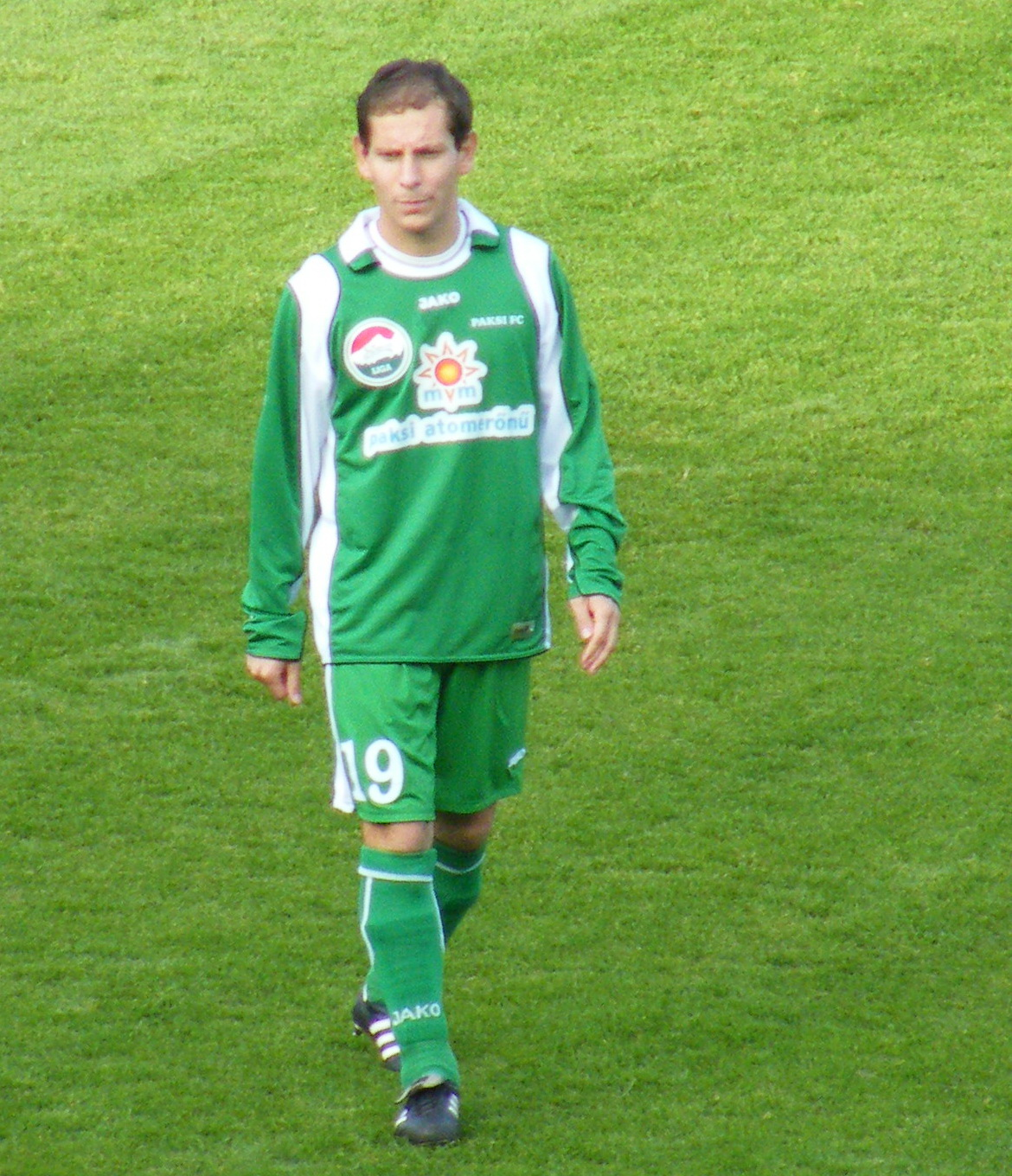

Personal information
- Date of birth: 3 March 1980 (age 46)
- Place of birth: Szekszárd, Hungary
- Height: 1.68 m (5 ft 6 in)
- Position: Midfielder

Youth career
- 1994–2002: Szekszárd

Senior career*
Years	Team	Apps	(Gls)
2002–2003	Szekszárd	32	(0)
2003–2013	Paks	62	(0)
2013–2016	Szekszárd	29	(0)
- * Club domestic league appearances and goals

István Mészáros (born 3 March 1980) is a Hungarian former football player.
