= Barnabás Vári =

Hungarian footballer

Personal information
- Date of birth: 15 September 1987 (age 39)
- Place of birth: Szeged, Hungary
- Height: 1.84 m (6 ft 1/2 in)
- Positions: Centre back; left back

Youth career
- 2003–2005: Dunaújváros

Senior career*
Years	Team	Apps	(Gls)
2005–2006	Dunaújváros	2	(0)
2006–2014	Paks	44	(2)
2011–2014	→ Szolnok (loan)	80	(10)
2014–2015	Szolnok	29	(13)
2015–2019	Kisvárda	116	(14)
2019–2021	Győri ETO	41	(3)
2021–2023	Szeged-Csanád	14	(2)
- * Club domestic league appearances and goals

Barnabás Vári (born 15 September 1987) is a Hungarian former football player.

== Career statistics ==
Appearances and goals by club, season and competition
Club	Season	League			Cup		League Cup		Europe		Total	
Club	Season	Division	Apps	Goals	Apps	Goals	Apps	Goals	Apps	Goals	Apps	Goals
Paks
Paks	2007–08	Nemzeti Bajnokság I	7	0	0	0	10	2	—		17	2
Paks	2008–09	Nemzeti Bajnokság I	20	2	1	0	7	0	—		28	2
Paks	2009–10	Nemzeti Bajnokság I	12	0	1	0	12	0	—		25	0
Paks	2010–11	Nemzeti Bajnokság I	5	0	1	0	8	2	—		14	2
Paks	Total		44	2	3	0	37	4	—		84	6
Szolnok
Szolnok	2011–12	Nemzeti Bajnokság II	27	7	0	0	—		—		27	7
Szolnok	2012–13	Nemzeti Bajnokság II	27	2	4	1	4	1	—		35	4
Szolnok	2013–14	Nemzeti Bajnokság II	26	1	0	0	4	0	—		30	1
Szolnok	2014–15	Nemzeti Bajnokság II	29	13	8	3	3	0	—		40	16
Szolnok	Total		109	23	12	4	7	1	—		128	28
Kisvárda
Kisvárda	2015–16	Nemzeti Bajnokság II	29	3	2	0	—		—		31	3
Kisvárda	2016–17	Nemzeti Bajnokság II	33	3	1	0	—		—		34	3
Kisvárda	2017–18	Nemzeti Bajnokság II	31	5	3	0	—		—		34	5
Kisvárda	2018–19	Nemzeti Bajnokság I	23	3	1	0	—		—		24	3
Kisvárda	Total		116	14	7	0	—		—		123	14
Career total			269	39	22	4	44	5	0	0	335	48

Updated to games played as of 19 May 2019.
