= Roland Pap =

Hungarian footballer

Personal information
- Full name: Roland Pap
- Date of birth: 17 August 1990 (age 36)
- Place of birth: Bonyhád, Hungary
- Height: 1.85 m (6 ft 1 in)
- Position: Forward

Team information
- Current team: Kozármisleny
- Number: 89

Youth career
- 2002–2008: Bonyhád
- 2008–2012: Paks

Senior career*
Years	Team	Apps	(Gls)
2008–2013	Paks	6	(1)
2012–2013	→ Vác (loan)	10	(1)
2013–	Kozármisleny	6	(0)
- * Club domestic league appearances and goals as of 1 December 2013

Roland Pap (born 17 August 1990 in Bonyhád) is a Hungarian football player who currently plays for Paksi SE.

== Career statistics ==
Appearances and goals by club, season and competition
Club	Season	League			Cup		League Cup		Europe		Total	
Club	Season	Division	Apps	Goals	Apps	Goals	Apps	Goals	Apps	Goals	Apps	Goals
Paks
Paks	2006–07	Nemzeti Bajnokság I	0	0	1	0	0	0	0	0	1	0
Paks	2007–08	Nemzeti Bajnokság I	0	0	0	0	1	0	0	0	1	0
Paks	2008–09	Nemzeti Bajnokság I	3	0	1	2	7	1	0	0	11	3
Paks	2009–10	Nemzeti Bajnokság I	0	0	2	1	8	3	0	0	10	4
Paks	2010–11	Nemzeti Bajnokság I	0	0	0	0	3	1	0	0	3	1
Paks	2011–12	Nemzeti Bajnokság I	0	0	1	2	1	0	0	0	2	0
Paks	2012–13	Nemzeti Bajnokság I	3	1	0	0	0	0	0	0	3	1
Paks	Total		6	1	5	5	20	5	0	0	31	11
Vác	2012–13	Nemzeti Bajnokság II	10	1	5	3	0	0	0	0	15	4
Kozármisleny	2013–14	Nemzeti Bajnokság II	6	0	0	0	1	1	0	0	7	1
Career total			22	2	10	8	21	6	0	0	53	16

Updated to games played as of 1 December 2013.
