= Szabolcs Udvari =

Hungarian footballer (1974–2020)

Personal information
- Date of birth: 26 July 1974
- Place of birth: Szeged, Hungary
- Date of death: 26 September 2020 (aged 46)
- Height: 1.88 m (6 ft 2 in)
- Position: Defender

Youth career
- Tiszakécskei FC
- Szeged LC

Senior career*
Years	Team	Apps	(Gls)
1999–2000	Szeged LC	14	(1)
2000–2001	Csongrádi FC	?	(?)
2001–2005	Békéscsabai Előre FC	56	(6)
2005–2006	Budapest Honvéd	24	(0)
2006–2007	Szombathelyi Haladás	6	(1)
2007	Kaposvölgye VSC	10	(0)
2008	Békéscsabai Előre FC	3	(0)
2008–2010	Tisza Volán	29	(3)
2010–2017	Mórahalom VSE	121	(19)
2017	Csengele KSE	7	(0)
- * Club domestic league appearances and goals as of 10 June 2017

Szabolcs Udvari (26 July 1974 – 26 September 2020) was a Hungarian footballer who played for Kaposvölgye VSC as defender.

== Sources ==
- Futballévkönyv 2003, I. kötet, 104–109. o., Aréna 2000 kiadó, Budapest, 2004 ISSN 1585-2172 (in Hungarian)
- Profile on hlsz.hu
