= Balázs Granát =

Hungarian footballer

Personal information
- Full name: Balázs Granát
- Date of birth: 24 May 1985 (age 41)
- Place of birth: Győr, Hungary
- Height: 1.86 m (6 ft 1 in)
- Position: Midfielder

Team information
- Current team: UFC Purbach

Senior career*
Years	Team	Apps	(Gls)
2004–2008	Győri ETO	24	(5)
2007	→ Gyirmót SE (loan)	1	(2)
2008	Nyíregyháza Spartacus	11	(2)
2008–2010	Lombard-Pápa TFC	24	(2)
2010–2011	Diósgyőri VTK	23	(12)
2011–	UFC Purbach		
- * Club domestic league appearances and goals as of 9 April 2011

Balázs Granát (born 24 May 1985 in Győr) is a Hungarian football player who currently plays for Diósgyőri VTK.
