= Krisztián Füzi =

Hungarian footballer

Personal information
- Full name: Krisztián Füzi
- Date of birth: 13 November 1975 (age 50)
- Place of birth: Kapuvár, Hungary
- Height: 1.80 m (5 ft 11 in)
- Position: Midfielder

Youth career
- 1993–1997: Győri ETO FC

Senior career*
Years	Team	Apps	(Gls)
1997–1999	BVSC Budapest	23	(1)
1999–2002	Budapest Honvéd FC	71	(1)
2002–2003	Győri ETO FC	18	(0)
2003–2006	Vasas SC	16	(0)
2006–2007	Budafoki LC	27	(6)
2007–2009	Erzsébeti Spartacus MTK LE	37	(3)
- * Club domestic league appearances and goals

Krisztián Füzi (born 13 November 1975) is a former Hungarian football player.
