= Dalibor Pleva =

Slovak footballer

Personal information
- Full name: Dalibor Pleva
- Date of birth: 2 April 1984 (age 42)
- Place of birth: Trenčín, Czechoslovakia
- Height: 1.81 m (5 ft 11 in)
- Positions: Full-back; defensive midfielder

Team information
- Current team: Lednické Rovne

Youth career
- FK Ozeta Dukla Trenčín
- Dubnica

Senior career*
Years	Team	Apps	(Gls)
2003–2009	Dubnica	150	(1)
2009–2011	Dukla Banská Bystrica	48	(2)
2011–2017	Termalica Bruk-Bet	153	(2)
2017–2018	GKS Katowice	6	(0)
2018	ViOn Zlaté Moravce	8	(0)
2018–2022	Dubnica	73	(2)
2022–	Lednické Rovne		

International career
	Slovakia U21	7	(0)
- * Club domestic league appearances and goals as of 28 February 2023

Dalibor Pleva (born 2 April 1984) is a Slovak footballer who plays as a midfielder for ŠK LR Crystal Lednické Rovne.

== Dalibor Pleva ==
- Dalibor Pleva at 90minut.pl (in Polish)
- Profile at official club website (in Slovak)
