= Zsolt Balog =

Hungarian football player

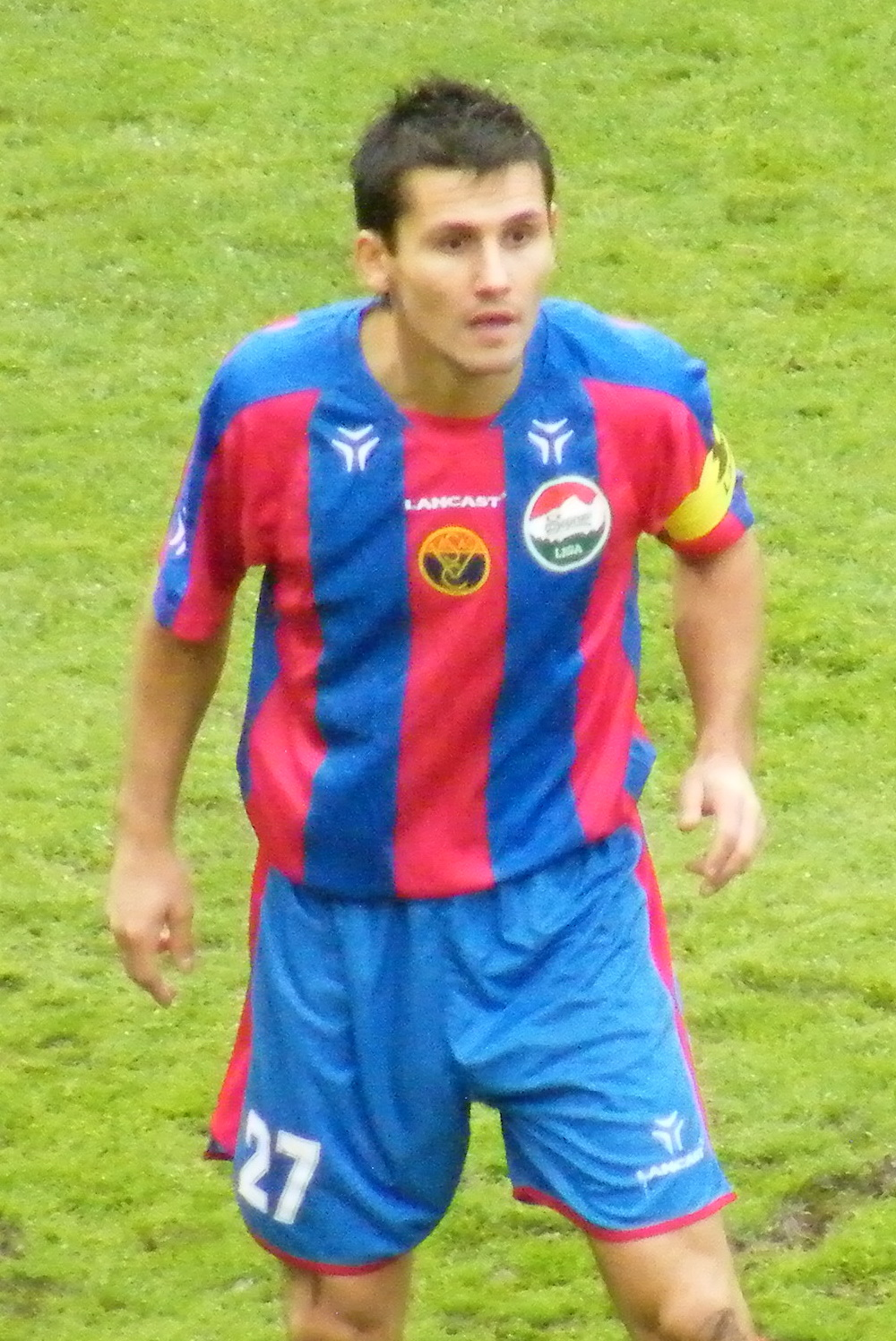

Personal information
- Date of birth: 10 November 1978 (age 47)
- Place of birth: Békés, Hungary
- Height: 1.84 m (6 ft 1/2 in)
- Position: Defender

Youth career
- 1992-1996: Békéscsaba

Senior career*
Years	Team	Apps	(Gls)
1996-1997	Békéscsaba	17	(0)
1997-1998	Honvéd	15	(0)
1998-2002	Békéscsaba	55	(7)
2002-2004	Debrecen	20	(0)
2004-2005	Békéscsaba	15	(1)
2005-2011	Vasas	159	(3)
2011-2013	Eger	46	(0)
2013-2016	Békéscsaba	85	(1)
2016-2022	Békéscsaba II	134	(6)
- * Club domestic league appearances and goals as of 5 June 2022

Zsolt Balog (born 10 November 1978 in Békés) is a Hungarian football (defender) player who currently plays for Békéscsaba 1912 Előre SE.
