= Csaba Regedei =

Hungarian footballer

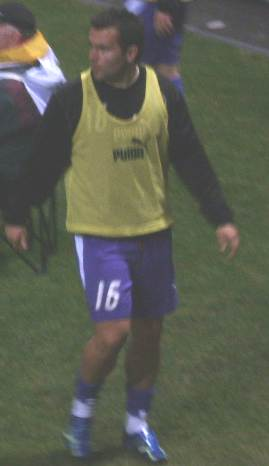
- Regedei in 2008

Personal information
- Date of birth: 16 January 1983 (age 43)
- Place of birth: Oroszlány, Hungary
- Height: 1.79 m (5 ft 10 1/2 in)
- Position: Defender

Youth career
- 1997–2000: Győri ETO FC

Senior career*
Years	Team	Apps	(Gls)
2000–2006	ETO Győr	114	(1)
2006–2007	Rákospalota	12	(1)
2007–2008	Újpest	19	(1)
2008–2009	DAC Dunajská Streda	20	(2)
2009–2012	Pécs	64	(4)
2012–	Gyirmót	26	(0)

International career^{‡}
1998–1999	Hungary U15	5	(0)
1999–2000	Hungary U16	16	(1)
2005	Hungary	2	(0)
- * Club domestic league appearances and goals as of 24 June 2020 ‡ National team caps and goals as of 18 December 2005

Csaba Regedei (born 16 January 1983) is a former Hungarian footballer.
