= Illovszky Rudolf Stadion (1960) =

Stadium in Budapest, Hungary

Coordinates: 47°32′13″N 19°04′50″E

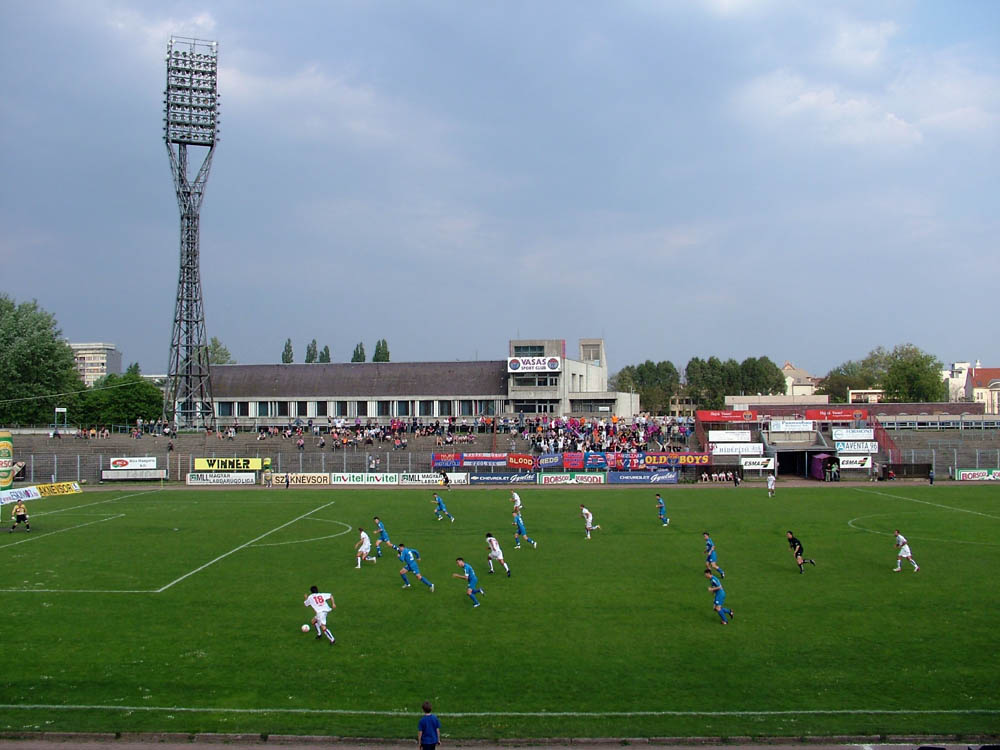
- Interactive map of Illovszky Rudolf Stadion
- Former names: Fáy utcai Stadion
- Location: Angyalföld, Budapest, Hungary
- Owner: Vasas SC
- Capacity: 3,000
- Surface: Grass; Field
- Field size: 105x68m

Construction
- Opened: 1960
- Closed: 2016
- Demolished: 2016

Tenants
- Vasas SC; MTK Budapest (2015–16); Újpest (2016)

Illovszky Rudolf Stadion was a multi-use stadium in Angyalföld, Budapest, Hungary. It was used mostly for football matches and was the home stadium of Vasas SC. The stadium was able to hold 18,000 people.

== History ==
In the 1970–71 Nemzeti Bajnokság I season an electronic scoreboard was mounted.

On 2 June 1990, the first official international match was played in the stadium. Hungary hosted Colombia. The friendly match ended with a 3–1 victory for Hungary. The first goal was scored by György Bognár.

On 3 June 2000, the last international football match was played. Hungary hosted Israel. The final result was 2–1 for Hungary, while the last goals was scored by Ferenc Horváth.

In July 2001 the plastic roof of the main stand was burnt. The damaged part was 30 metres long.

On 21 February 2002 the stadium was named after Vasas SC legend Rudolf Illovszky.

On 29 October 2016, the last match was played in the stadium. Vasas hosted Videoton in the 2016–17 Nemzeti Bajnokság I season. The match ended with 1–1 draw and the last goal was scored by Lazović in the 92nd minute.

=== Demolition ===
The stadium was demolished in 2016 to build a completely new football stadium.

== Milestone matches ==
29 October 2016	Vasas SC (Hungary)	1–1	(Hungary) Videoton FC	2016–17 Nemzeti Bajnokság I (Last match)
	Remili 37'	Report	90+2' Lazović	Attendance: 5,045; Referee: Iványi (Hungary)

== International matches ==
2 June 1990	Hungary	3–1	Colombia	Friendly match
		[ Report]		Attendance: 5,000

8 March 1995	Hungary	3–1	Latvia	Friendly match
		[ Report]		Attendance: 3,000

11 November 1995	Hungary	1–0	Iceland	1996 UEFA Euro Qualification
	Illés 56'	Report		Attendance: 3,000; Referee: Georgios Bikas (Greece

3 June 2000	Hungary	2–1	Israel	Friendly match
		[ Report]		Attendance: 5,000

== Attendances ==
As of 11 April 2017.

Season	Average
2010–11	2,427
2011–12	2,385

== Gallery ==
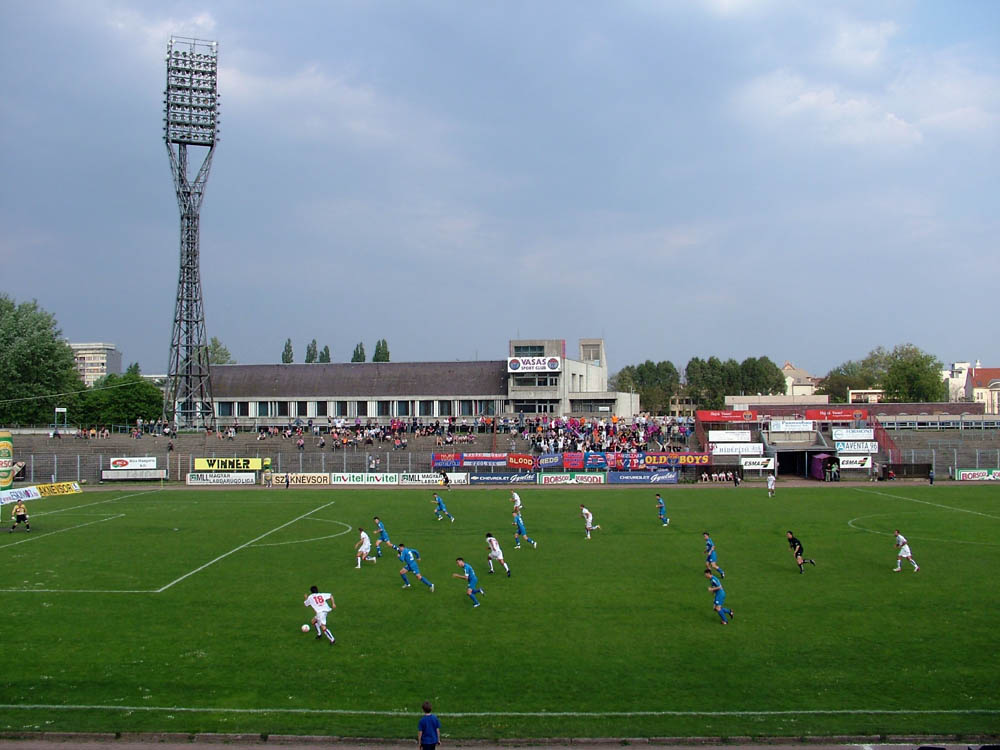
Vasas – Zalaegerszegi TE in the 2006–07 Nemzeti Bajnokság I
