= Attila Kriston =

Hungarian footballer

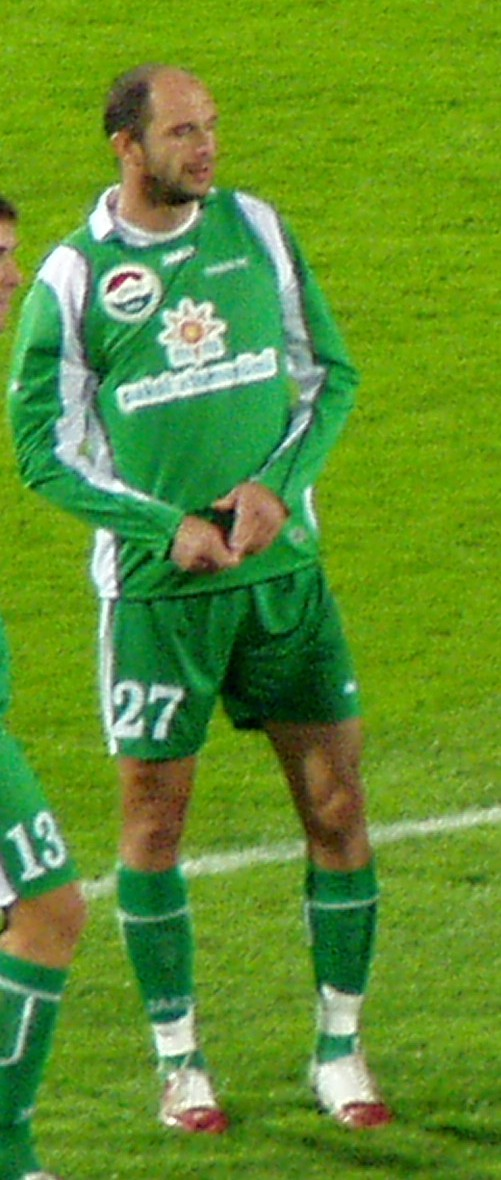

Personal information
- Date of birth: 6 June 1975 (age 51)
- Place of birth: Budapest, Hungary
- Height: 1.96 m (6 ft 5 in)
- Position: Midfielder

Youth career
- 1989–1995: Budapest Honvéd FC
- 1995–1996: BFC Siófok

Senior career*
Years	Team	Apps	(Gls)
1996–1997	BFC Siófok	31	(2)
1997	Sachsen Leipzig	10	(0)
1997–1998	BFC Siófok	15	(2)
1998–2004	Ferencvárosi TC	133	(7)
2004	Livingston	5	(0)
2004–2005	Videoton FC	11	(2)
2005–2006	Zalaegerszegi TE	9	(2)
2006	Kaposvári Rákóczi FC	14	(2)
2006–2007	MTK Budapest FC	13	(0)
2007–2008	FC Tatabánya	14	(1)
2008–2009	Paksi SE	21	(2)
2011	UFC Strallegg		
2011–2012	ASKÖ Rotenturm		
2012–2013	UFC Strallegg		
2013–2014	Markt Neuhodis		
2014–2015	UFC Sulz		
2015–2016	Markt Neuhodis		

International career
2004	Hungary	1	(0)
- * Club domestic league appearances and goals as of 11 July 2012

Attila Kriston (born 6 June 1975 in Budapest) is a former Hungarian professional football player who played for Livingston and Hungary among others.
