= András Tóth (footballer, born 1973) =

Hungarian footballer

Personal information
- Date of birth: 16 December 1973 (age 52)
- Place of birth: Budapest, Hungary
- Height: 1.78 m (5 ft 10 in)
- Position: Defender

Team information
- Current team: Dorog (manager)

Senior career*
Years	Team	Apps	(Gls)
1993–1996	Rákospalota	57	(0)
1996–2002	Vasas	142	(2)
2002–2003	Sopron	22	(2)
2003–2009	Vasas	134	(9)
2008	Vasas II	1	(0)
2010	Martonvásár	12	(1)
2010	Biatorbágy	10	(0)
Total		378	(14)

International career
2004	Hungary	5	(0)

Managerial career
- 2020: Vasas (caretaker)
- 2026–: Dorog
- * Club domestic league appearances and goals

András Tóth (born 16 December 1973) is a Hungarian football manager and former professional player who is currently the manager of Nemzeti Bajnokság III club Dorog.

== Managerial career ==
=== Vasas ===
On 27 August 2020, Tóth took over Nemzeti Bajnokság II club Vasas as caretaker manager following the dismissal of Ferenc Bene. He was in charge of the club until 8 September when he was replaced by Szabolcs Schindler.

=== Dorog ===
On 29 May 2026, Nemzeti Bajnokság III club Dorog appointed Tóth as manager, effective from 1 July, replacing Csaba Csizmadia.

== Career statistics ==
=== Club ===
Appearances and goals by club, season and competition
Club	Season	League			Magyar Kupa		Ligakupa		Europe		Other		Total	
Club	Season	Division	Apps	Goals	Apps	Goals	Apps	Goals	Apps	Goals	Apps	Goals	Apps	Goals
Rákospalota	1993–94	Nemzeti Bajnokság II	20	0	—		—		—		—		20	0
Rákospalota	1994–95	Nemzeti Bajnokság III	19	0	—		—		—		—		19	0
Rákospalota	1995–96	Nemzeti Bajnokság III	18	0	—		—		—		—		18	0
Rákospalota	Total		57	0	—		—		—		—		57	0
Vasas	1995–96	Nemzeti Bajnokság I	6	0	—		—		—		—		6	0
Vasas	1996–97	Nemzeti Bajnokság I	7	0	3	0	—		2 (Note: Appearances in UEFA Intertoto Cup)	0	—		12	0
Vasas	1997–98	Nemzeti Bajnokság I	21	0	3	0	—		2	0	—		26	0
Vasas	1998–99	Nemzeti Bajnokság I	29	0	5	0	—		—		—		34	0
Vasas	1999–2000	Nemzeti Bajnokság I	26	0	5	0	—		6	0	—		37	0
Vasas	2000–01	Nemzeti Bajnokság I	22	1	—		—		4 (Note: Appearances in UEFA Cup)	0	—		26	1
Vasas	2001–02	Nemzeti Bajnokság I	31	1	1	0	—		—		—		32	1
Vasas	Total		142	2	17	0	—		14	0	—		173	2
Sopron	2002–03	Nemzeti Bajnokság I	22	2	2	1	—		—		—		24	3
Vasas	2003–04	Nemzeti Bajnokság II	23	1	4	0	—		—		—		27	1
Vasas	2004–05	Nemzeti Bajnokság I	26	1	3	0	—		—		—		29	1
Vasas	2005–06	Nemzeti Bajnokság I	26	0	7	0	—		2	0	—		35	0
Vasas	2006–07	Nemzeti Bajnokság I	20	2	4	0	—		—		—		24	2
Vasas	2007–08	Nemzeti Bajnokság I	21	2	5	0	7	0	—		—		33	2
Vasas	2008–09	Nemzeti Bajnokság I	18	3	—		4	2	—		—		22	5
Vasas	Total		134	9	23	0	11	2	2	0	—		170	11
Vasas II	2007–08	Nemzeti Bajnokság III	1	0	—		—		—		—		1	0
Martonvásár	2009–10	Megyei Bajnokság I	12	1	—		—		—		—		12	1
Biatorbágy	2010–11	Nemzeti Bajnokság III	10	0	—		—		—		1 (Note: Appearance in Pest Megyei Szuperkupa)	0	11	0
Career total			378	14	42	1	11	2	16	0	1	0	448	17

=== International ===
Appearances and goals by national team and year
National team	Year	Apps	Goals
Hungary	2004	5	0
Total		5	0

== Honours ==
Vasas

- Magyar Kupa runner-up: 1999–2000, 2005–06

Biatorbágy

- Pest Megyei Szuperkupa runner-up: 2010
