= Ádám Weitner =

Hungarian footballer

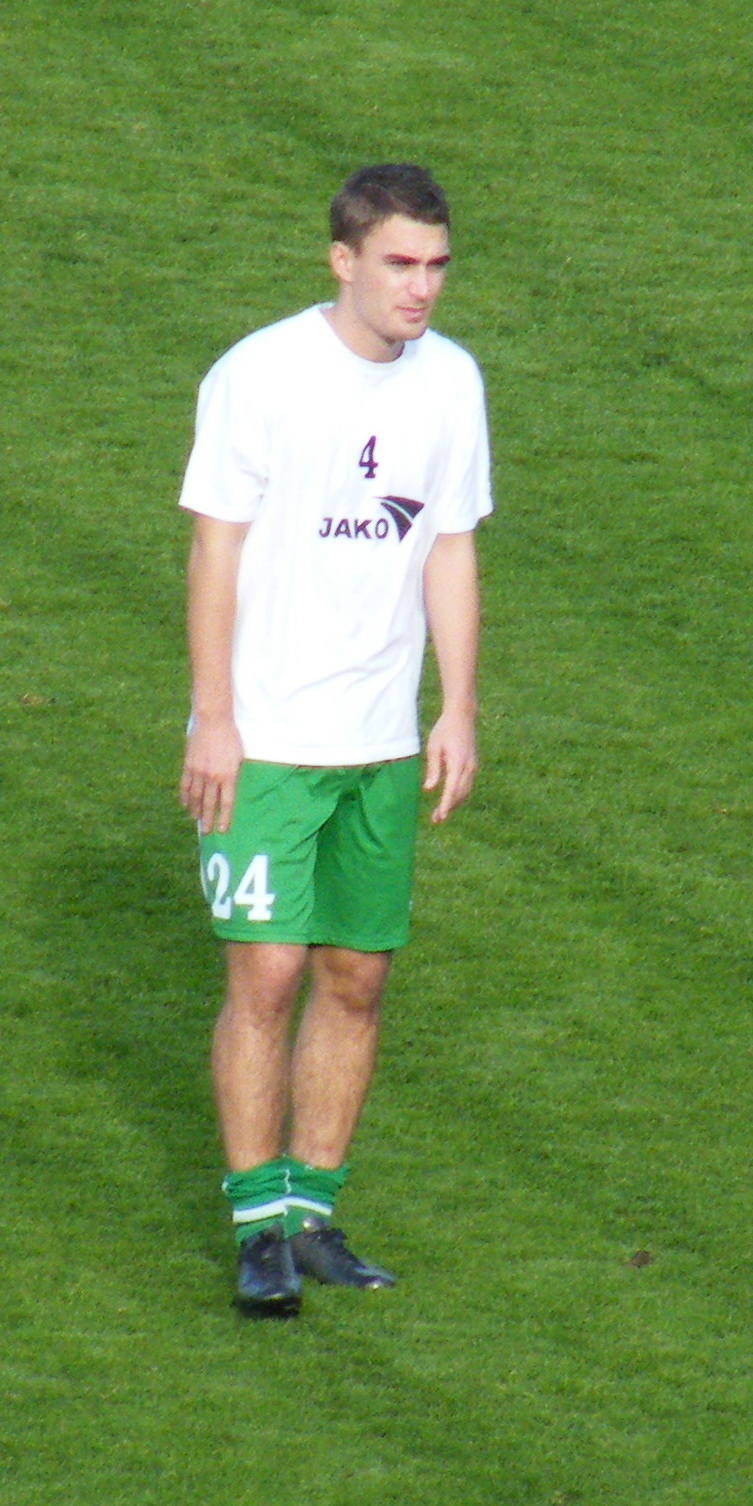

Personal information
- Date of birth: 9 September 1982 (age 44)
- Place of birth: Pécs, Hungary
- Height: 1.80 m (5 ft 11 in)
- Position: Forward

Youth career
- 1996–1998: Szekszárd
- 1998–2000: Újpest
- 2000–2001: Győr

Senior career*
Years	Team	Apps	(Gls)
2001–2003	Győr	12	(0)
2003–2006	Vasas	24	(0)
2006–2007	Gyirmót	20	(15)
2007–2008	Felcsút	26	(13)
2008–2010	Paks	14	(1)
2010–2012	Gyirmót	34	(13)
2012–2014	Tatabánya	60	(15)
2014–2015	Ajka	11	(1)
2015	Szigetszentmiklós	9	(1)
2015–2016	Győr	26	(8)
2016–2018	Csorna	36	(17)
2018	Ménfőcsanak	13	(6)

Managerial career
- 2018–2020: Ménfőcsanak
- 2020–2021: Sopron
- 2021–2022: Pápa
- 2022–2023: Pécs
- 2024–2025: Mosonmagyaróvár
- 2025–: Gyirmót
- * Club domestic league appearances and goals

Ádám Weitner (born 9 September 1982) is a Hungarian football coach and a former player.

== Coaching career ==
On 29 June 2022, Weitner was hired as the manager of Pécs. He was dismissed by Pécs on 28 September 2023.
