= Szeged LC =

Hungarian football club

- Founded: 1998
- Dissolved: 2000
- Ground: Felső Tisza-parti Stadion
- Capacity: 15.000

Szeged LC was a Hungarian football club from the town of Szeged.

== History ==
Szeged LC debuted in the 1999–2000 season of the Hungarian League, but withdrew during the winter break and were eliminated from the championship. The club dissolved in 2000.

== Name Changes ==
- 1998–2000: Szeged LC
