= Miklós Salamon =

Hungarian footballer (born 1974)

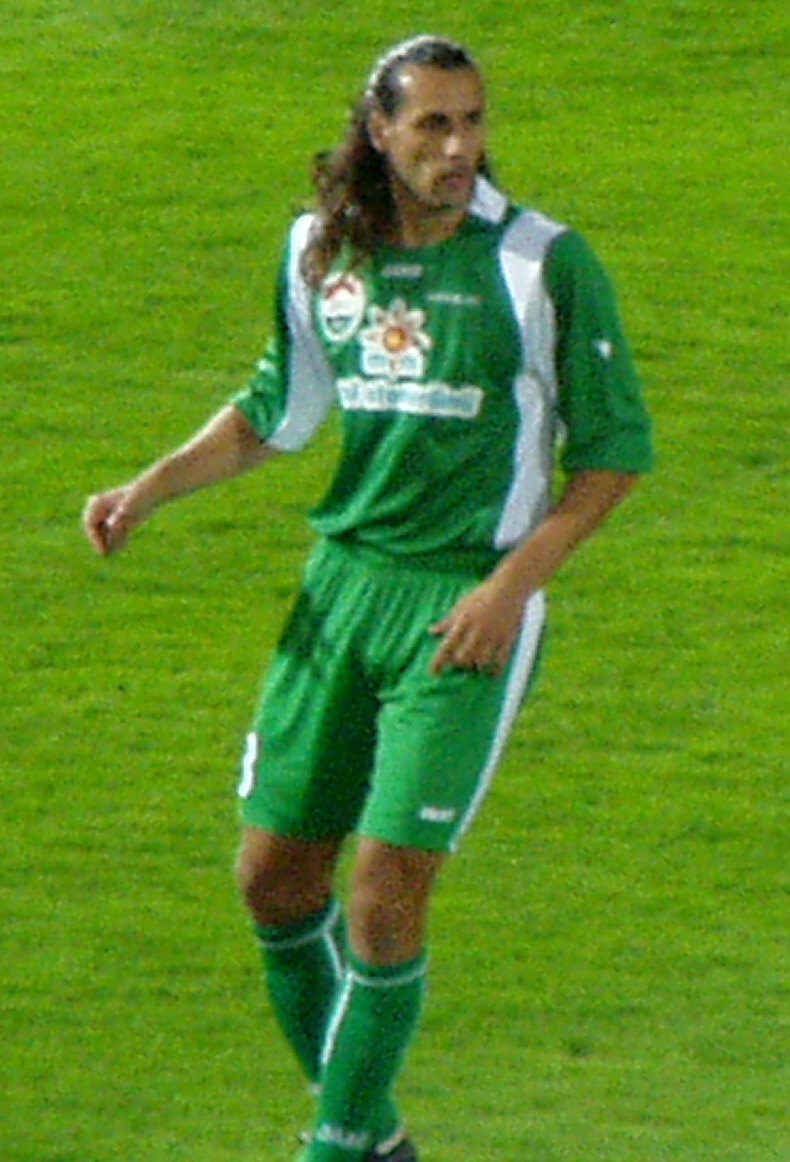
- 2008

Personal information
- Date of birth: 30 November 1974 (age 51)
- Place of birth: Hungary
- Position: Defender

Youth career
- 1988–1994: Dunaújváros FC (1952)
- 1994–1998: Kecskeméti SC

Senior career*
Years	Team	Apps	(Gls)
1998–2002	Dunaújváros FC (1952)	144	(5)
2002–2003	Győri ETO FC	14	(0)
2003–2006	Vasas SC	28	(0)
2006–2008	Paksi FC	79	(0)
2009	CF Liberty Oradea		
2009–2015	Dunaújváros PASE	49	(2)
2015–2021	Géderlaki KSE	155	(71)
2021–2023	Mezőfalva Medosz SE		

International career
2000–2003	Hungary	2	(0)
- * Club domestic league appearances and goals

Miklós Salamon (born 30 November 1974) is a Hungarian former footballer who played as a defender.

== Early life ==
Salamon swam as a child. He started playing football at the age of fifteen.

== Career ==
Salamon started his career with Hungarian side Dunaújváros FC. In 2002, he signed for Hungarian side Győri ETO FC. In 2003, he signed for Hungarian side Vasas SC. In 2006, he signed for Hungarian side Paksi FC. In 2009, he signed for Romanian side CF Liberty Oradea. After that, he signed for Hungarian side Dunaújváros PASE. In 2015, he signed for Hungarian side Géderlaki KSE. In 2021, he signed for Hungarian side Mezőfalva Medosz SE. He helped the club win the league.

== Personal life ==
Salamon was born in 1974 in Hungary. He has been married.
