= Stadion ETO =

Sports venue in Győr, Hungary

- Interactive map of Stadion ETO
- Full name: Stadion ETO
- Location: Győr, Hungary
- Coordinates: 47.696419°N 17.664428°E
- Owner: Győri ETO FC
- Operator: Győri ETO FC
- Capacity: 28,000

Construction
- Opened: 1977
- Closed: 2006

Tenant
- Győri ETO FC

Stadion ETO was a multi-use stadium in Győr, Hungary. It was initially used as the stadium of Győri ETO FC matches. It was replaced by ETO Park in 2008. The capacity of the stadium was 28,000 spectators at its peak, but was later reduced to 14,600 (UEFA capacity).
