= Zsolt Bárányos =

Hungarian footballer

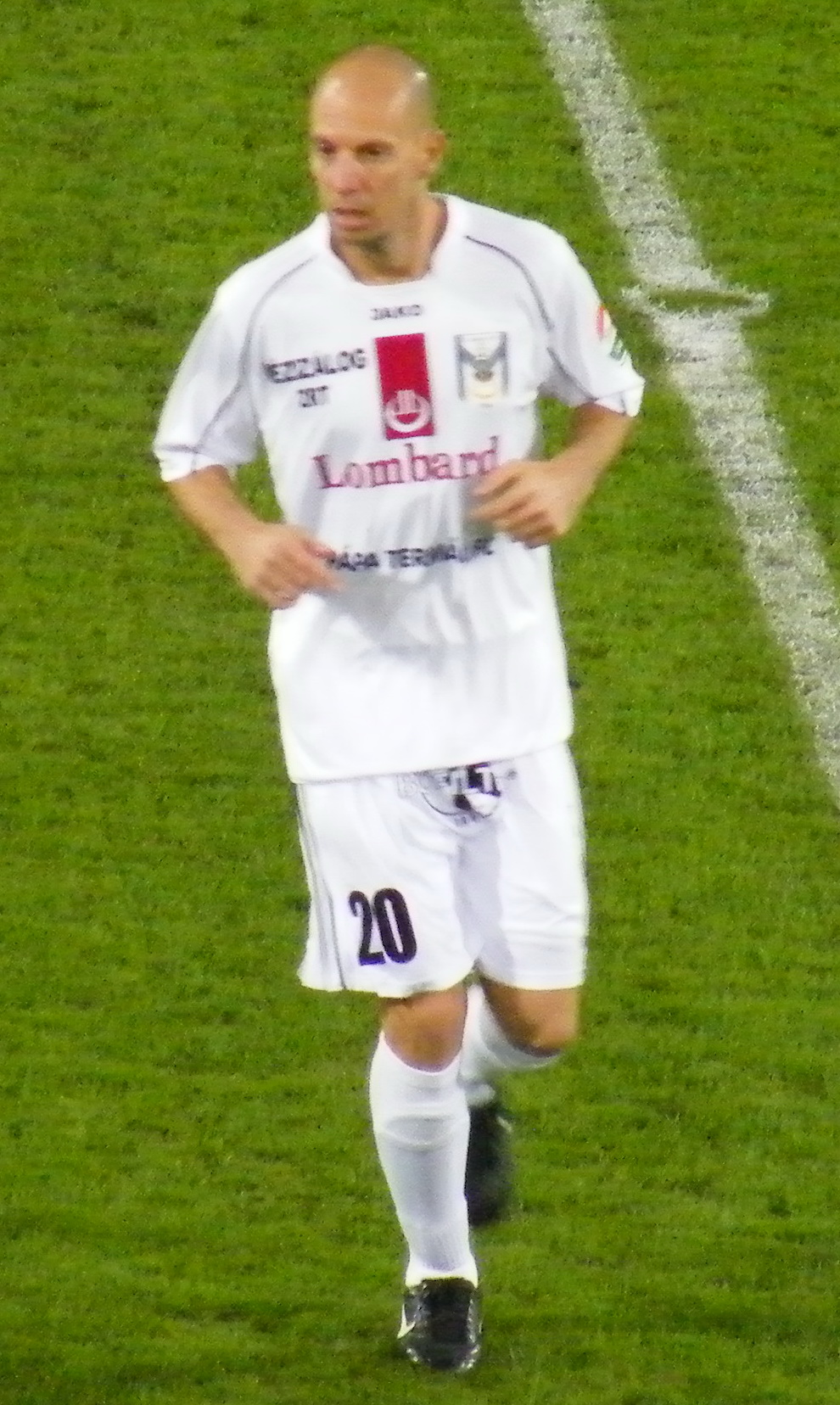

Personal information
- Full name: Zsolt Bárányos
- Date of birth: 25 December 1975 (age 50)
- Place of birth: Budapest, Hungary
- Height: 1.85 m (6 ft 1 in)
- Position: Midfielder

Team information
- Current team: Vasas SC
- Number: 10

Youth career
- 1989–1993: Budapest Honvéd FC

Senior career*
Years	Team	Apps	(Gls)
1993–1998	Budapest Honvéd FC	105	(21)
1998–1999	K.F.C. Lommel S.K.	19	(0)
1999–2000	Ferencvárosi TC	31	(9)
2000–2002	K.F.C. Lommel S.K.	52	(20)
2002–2003	Budapest Honvéd FC	19	(4)
2004–2005	FC Sopron	28	(14)
2005–2006	Vasas SC	27	(5)
2006	Rákospalotai EAC	9	(1)
2007	Asteras Tripolis F.C.	10	(3)
2007–2008	Budapest Honvéd FC	24	(8)
2008–2009	Nyíregyháza Spartacus FC	15	(2)
2009–2011	Lombard-Pápa TFC	72	(17)
2011–2012	Vasas SC	29	(4)
2012	Szigetszentmiklósi TK	6	(0)
2013	Nyíregyháza SFC	12	(1)
2013–2014	Budaörsi SC	0	(0)
2014	Salgótarjáni BTC	0	(0)
2014	Draßmarkt	0	(0)
2015–2016	FC Dabas	20	(1)
2016–2017	Rákosmenti KSK	30	(10)

International career
1996–1997	Hungary U-21	2	(0)
2002–2005	Hungary	6	(0)
- * Club domestic league appearances and goals as of 22 September 2022

Zsolt Bárányos (born 25 December 1975) is a Hungarian football player who plays as a midfielder. He made most of his career in Hungary, playing for nine different clubs in two decades. He retired in 2017.

== Career ==
Zsolt Baranyos's first team was Kispest Honvéd, joining in 1993. After five seasons, punctuated by a victory in Cup of Hungary in 1996, he moved abroad and joined in 1998 K.F.C. Lommel S.K., who played in Belgian first division. After a year, he returned to Hungary and signed to Ferencvárosi TC, a historic rival of the Kispest. It remained there for a season then returned to Lommel. He helped the club back into Division 1 but in March 2002, the club were put into bankruptcy and ceased operations.

Free from contract, Baranyos returned to his trainer club where he plays yet a season. From 2003, it changes very regularly Club, signing 12 transfers in ten years. He plays for Vasas SC in 2003, then went a year in the MATAV SC Sopron where he won his second cup of Hungary, before returning for a season at the Vasas. He spent six months thereafter to Rákospalotai EAC, then joined in January 2007 PAE Asteras Tripolis, where it is second Greek division champion. He returned to Hungary in the summer and passes a new season to Budapest Honvéd, followed by six months at Nyíregyháza Spartacus FC. In January 2009, he is committed to the Lombard - Papa TFC, where he remained until June 2011. He then joined Vasas SC, where he again spent only a season for the third time.

In July 2012, he signed to the TK Szigetszentmiklosi, which he left six months later to return to the Nyíregyháza Spartacus FC, where he finished the season. In July 2013 he joined the ranks of Budaorsi SC for a short spell, before going on to play for another four different clubs in the lower leagues of Hungarian and Austrian football prior to his retirement at the age of 41 in 2017.
