= János Zováth =

Hungarian footballer

Personal information
- Full name: János Zováth
- Date of birth: 25 February 1977 (age 49)
- Place of birth: Gödöllő, Hungary
- Height: 1.79 m (5 ft 10 1/2 in)
- Position: Midfielder

Youth career
- BVSC Budapest

Senior career*
Years	Team	Apps	(Gls)
1994–1998	BVSC Budapest	53	(1)
1998-1999	Tiszakécske FC	2	(0)
1999-2000	Honvéd FC	15	(0)
2000–2001	Vasas SC	60	(0)
2001–2003	Dunaferr SE	43	(2)
2003–2005	Ferencvárosi TC	36	(0)
2005	AEP Paphos	5	(0)
2005–2006	Vasas SC	25	(0)
2006–2008	Paksi SE	77	(2)
2010–2011	Egri FC	22	(0)
2011–2012	Mezőkövesd-Zsóry SE	16	(0)
2012–	Szolnoki MÁV	1	(0)

International career
1997	Hungary U20	2	(0)
- * Club domestic league appearances and goals

János Zováth (born 25 February 1977 in Gödöllő) is a Hungarian football player who currently plays for Mezőkövesd-Zsóry SE.

== FIFA Youth World Cup ==
In 1997, János Zováth was a member of the Hungarian under-20 team which participated in 1997 FIFA world cup in Malaysia. During the tournament, he played in 2 matches against Argentina (0–3) and Australia (0–1). However, he missed the last game against Canada (1–2) due to suspension.

== Honours ==
- Hungarian League:
  - Winner: 2004
  - Runner-up: 2005
- Hungarian Cup:
  - Winner: 2004
  - Runner-up: 2005, 2006
