= Zoltán Pintér =

Hungarian footballer

Personal information
- Full name: Zoltán Pintér
- Date of birth: 23 November 1977 (age 48)
- Place of birth: Budapest, Hungary
- Height: 1.70 m (5 ft 7 in)
- Position: Midfielder

Team information
- Current team: Nagykörös Kinizsi
- Number: 6

Senior career*
Years	Team	Apps	(Gls)
1995–2002	Budapest Honvéd FC	99	(4)
2002–2005	FC Sopron	90	(2)
2005–2006	Diósgyőri VTK	9	(0)
2006–2007	Vasas SC	29	(0)
2007–2008	FC Sopron	12	(0)
2008–2009	Diósgyőri VTK	25	(1)
2009	Rákospalotai EAC	12	(0)
2009–	Szigetszentmiklósi TK	0	(0)

International career
2002	Hungary	1	(0)
- * Club domestic league appearances and goals as of 23 May 2009

Zoltán Pintér (born 23 November 1977, in Budapest) is a Hungarian football player who currently plays for Szigetszentmiklósi TK.
