= Tibor Márkus =

Hungarian footballer

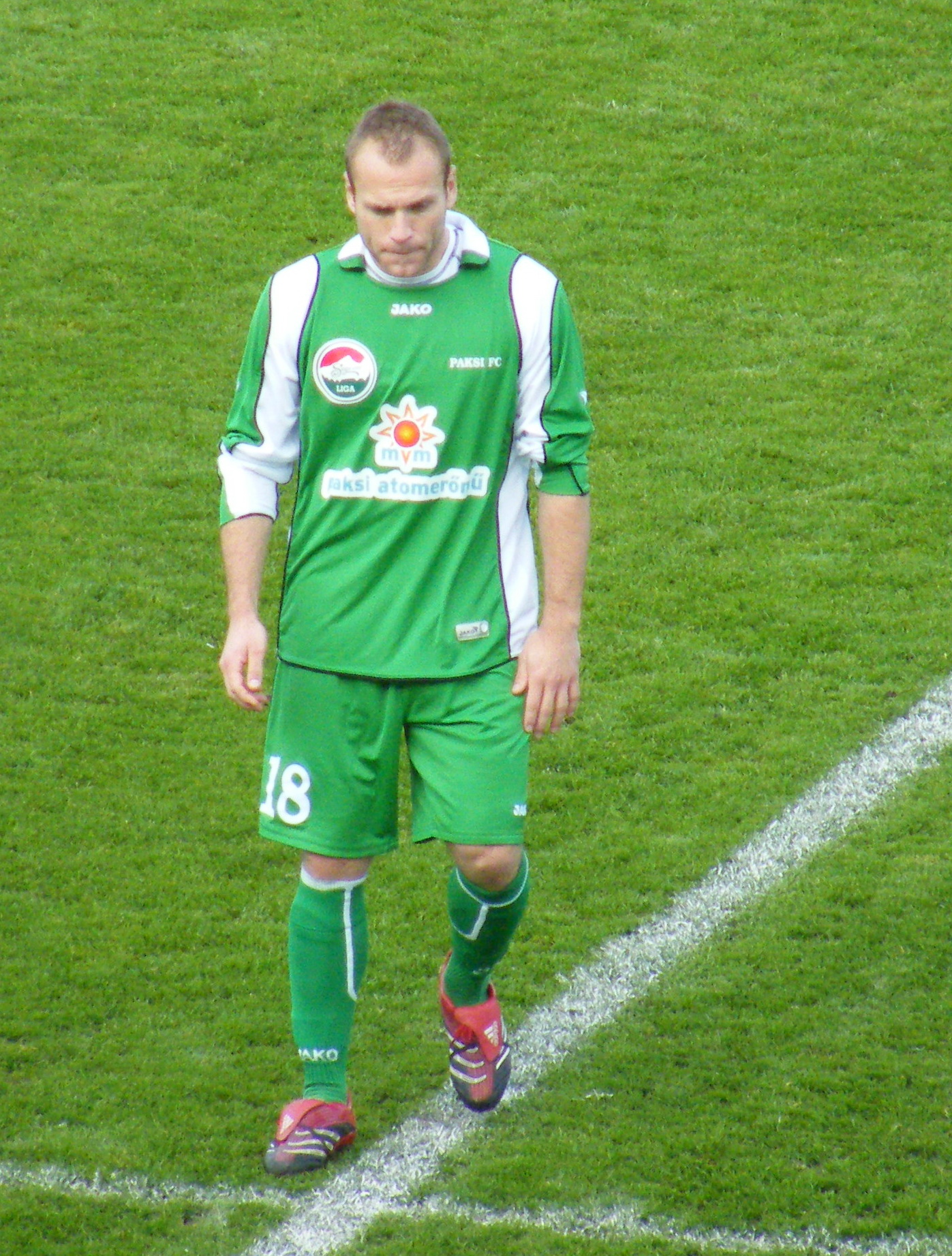

Personal information
- Full name: Márkus Tibor
- Date of birth: 10 October 1978 (age 48)
- Place of birth: Budapest, Hungary
- Height: 1.77 m (5 ft 10 in)
- Position: Striker

Senior career*
Years	Team	Apps	(Gls)
1996–1998	Ferencvárosi TC	0	(0)
1998–1999	BFC Siófok	15	(0)
1998–1999	Nyíregyháza Spartacus	5	(0)
1999–2000	III. Kerületi TVE	32	(6)
2000–2001	Csepel SC	26	(1)
2001–2002	Fóti SE	29	(9)
2002–2003	Százhalombatta	21	(6)
2002–2003	RoPS	26	(11)
2004–2006	FC Tatabánya	57	(59)
2006–2007	Apollon Limassol	14	(1)
2007–2008	Digenis Akritas Morphou	22	(0)
2008–2011	Paksi SE	26	(5)
2009	→ Ferencvárosi TC (loan)	1	(1)
2009	→ Nyíregyháza Spartacus (loan)	1	(0)
2010	→ Budaörsi SC (loan)	36	(8)
2011–2012	Biatorbágy SE	15	(10)
2012–	Szigetszentmiklósi TK	27	(14)
- * Club domestic league appearances and goals as of 13 August 2015

Tibor Márkus is a Hungarian football player. He plays for Szigetszentmiklósi TK. He also played for Rovaniemen Palloseura and Apollon Limassol.
