= Gyula Hegedűs =

Hungarian footballer

Personal information
- Date of birth: 25 February 1980 (age 46)
- Place of birth: Budapest, Hungary
- Height: 1.88 m (6 ft 2 in)
- Position: Defender

Team information
- Current team: Balatonlelle

Youth career
- 2000–2001: Csepel SC

Senior career*
Years	Team	Apps	(Gls)
2001–2003	Vasas SC	33	(0)
2003	BKV Előre SC	16	(3)
2003–2004	BFC Siófok	22	(1)
2004–2007	Debreceni VSC	17	(0)
2006	→ Vasas SC (loan)	9	(0)
2007–2008	Diósgyőri VTK	38	(0)
2008–2009	BFC Siófok	27	(0)
2009–2011	Szolnoki MÁV FC	31	(0)
2011–2012	Veszprém FC	26	(3)
2017–	Balatonlelle		
- * Club domestic league appearances and goals as of 26 November 2011

Gyula Hegedűs (born 25 February 1980) is a Hungarian football (defender) player who plays for Balatonlelle.
