= Ferenc Horváth =

Hungarian footballer (born 1973)

Personal information
- Date of birth: 6 May 1973 (age 53)
- Place of birth: Budapest, Hungary
- Height: 1.86 m (6 ft 1 in)
- Position: Striker

Senior career*
| Years | Team | Apps | (Gls) |
| 1991–1996 | Videoton | 138 | (54) |
| 1996–1998 | Ferencváros | 62 | (27) |
| 1998–2000 | Genk | 33 | (11) |
| 2000 | Energie Cottbus | 9 | (0) |
| 2001–2002 | Maccabi Tel Aviv | 51 | (8) |
| 2002–2003 | Újpest | 29 | (13) |
| 2003 | Almería | 5 | (0) |
| 2003–2004 | Estoril | 12 | (3) |
| 2004 | Videoton | 7 | (3) |
| 2005 | Livingston | 8 | (2) |
| 2005 | Diósgyőr | 13 | (8) |
| 2006–2007 | Fehérvár | 26 | (6) |
| 2007 | Paks | 4 | (2) |
| 2008 | Lombard-Pápa | 3 | (0) |
| 2008–2009 | SC Ostbahn XI | | |

International career
| 1996–2001 | Hungary | 32 | (11) |

Managerial career
- 2008–2010: Ferencváros (youth)
- 2011–2012: Szigetszentmiklós
- 2012–2013: Kecskemét
- 2013: Paks
- 2014: Győri ETO FC
- 2015: Szigetszentmiklósi TK
- 2015–2016: Videoton
- 2016–2017: Diósgyőr
- 2017–2018: Balmazújváros
- 2018–2019: Haladás
- 2021–2022: Budapest Honvéd
- * Club domestic league appearances and goals

Ferenc Horváth (born 6 May 1973) is a Hungarian former professional footballer who played as a striker. He is now a manager, most recently coaching at Budapest Honvéd FC.

He made his debut for the Hungary national team in 1996, and got 32 caps and 11 goals until 2001.

After transitioning into coaching, Horváth managed numerous Nemzeti Bajnokság I clubs, including Kecskeméti TE, Paksi FC, Győri ETO FC, Videoton, Diósgyőri VTK, Balmazújvárosi FC, Szombathelyi Haladás, and Budapest Honvéd FC..

== Career statistics ==
Scores and results list Hungary's goal tally first, score column indicates score after each Horváth goal.

List of international goals scored by Ferenc Horváth
| No. | Date | Venue | Opponent | Score | Result | Competition |
|---|---|---|---|---|---|---|
| 1 | 25 March 1998 | Ernst-Happel-Stadion, Vienna, Austria | Austria | 1–0 | 3–2 | Friendly |
| 2 | 6 September 1998 | Népstadion, Budapest, Hungary | Portugal | 1–0 | 1–3 | UEFA Euro 2000 qualification |
| 3 | 26 April 2000 | Windsor Park, Belfast, Northern Ireland | Northern Ireland | 1–0 | 1–0 | Friendly |
| 4 | 31 May 2000 | ETO Park, Győr, Hungary | Saudi Arabia | 1–0 | 2–2 | Friendly |
| 5 | 31 May 2000 | ETO Park, Győr, Hungary | Saudi Arabia | 2–0 | 2–2 | Friendly |
| 6 | 3 June 2000 | Illovszky Rudolf Stadion, Budapest, Hungary | Israel | 2–0 | 2–1 | Friendly |
| 7 | 3 September 2000 | Népstadion, Budapest, Hungary | Italy | 1–1 | 2–2 | 2002 FIFA World Cup qualification |
| 8 | 3 September 2000 | Népstadion, Budapest, Hungary | Italy | 2–2 | 2–2 | 2002 FIFA World Cup qualification |
| 9 | 11 October 2000 | Darius and Girėnas Stadium, Kaunas, Lithuania | Lithuania | 4–0 | 6–1 | 2002 FIFA World Cup qualification |
| 10 | 28 February 2001 | Bilino Polje Stadium, Zenica, Bosnia and Herzegovina | Bosnia and Herzegovina | 1–0 | 1–1 | Friendly |
| 11 | 15 August 2001 | Népstadion, Budapest, Hungary | Germany | 2–4 | 2–5 | Friendly |

== Honours ==
=== As a player ===
Genk

- Belgian League: 1999
- Belgian Cup: 2000
- Belgian Supercup: runners-up: 1999, 2000

Maccabi Tel Aviv

- Israeli Cup: 2002

Estoril

- Portuguese Second Division: 2004

FC Fehérvár

- Hungarian Cup: 2006
- Liga Cup: 2007
