= Szabolcs Gyánó =

Hungarian footballer

Personal information
- Date of birth: 9 January 1980 (age 46)
- Place of birth: Dombóvár, Hungary
- Height: 1.86 m (6 ft 1 in)
- Position: Striker

Youth career
- Dombóvári FC
- Szekszárdi UFC

Senior career*
Years	Team	Apps	(Gls)
1999–2001	Kecskemét	7	(3)
2001–2003	Vasas	46	(11)
2003–2005	Zalaegerszeg	45	(13)
2005–2006	Vasas	24	(11)
2006–2008	Académica Coimbra	26	(5)
2008	Beira-Mar	7	(2)
2008–2009	Vasas	9	(1)
2009–2012	Pécs	67	(35)
2012	→ Kozármisleny (loan)	11	(3)
2012	Sopron	11	(3)
- * Club domestic league appearances and goals

Szabolcs Gyánó (born 9 January 1980) is a Hungarian former footballer.

== Club career ==
On 7 August 2006 he moved to Académica de Coimbra. After two years he returned to his home country, and signed to Vasas.
