= 2005–06 Zalaegerszegi TE season =

Zalaegerszeg
2005–06 season
- Manager: László Dajka (until 10 December 2005); Lázár Szentes (from 1 January 2006 to 8 May 2006); Antal Simon (from 9 May 2006)
- Stadium: ZTE Arena
- Nemzeti Bajnokság I: 11th
- Magyar Kupa: Round of 16
- Highest home attendance: 9,000 v Ferencváros (27 August 2005, Nemzeti Bajnokság I)
- Lowest home attendance: 1,200 v Sopron (26 October 2005, Magyar Kupa)
- Average home league attendance: 3,760
- Biggest win: 5–0 v Nagyatád (Away, 10 September 2005, Magyar Kupa); 5–0 v Pápa (Home, 24 September 2005, Nemzeti Bajnokság I)
- Biggest defeat: 0–4 v Honvéd (Away, 17 September 2005, Nemzeti Bajnokság I); 1–5 v Sopron (Home, 26 October 2005, Magyar Kupa); 1–5 v Újpest (Away, 7 May 2006, Nemzeti Bajnokság I)

The 2005–06 season was Zalaegerszegi Torna Egylet's 30th competitive season, 12th consecutive season in the Nemzeti Bajnokság I and 66th season in existence as a football club. In addition to the domestic league, Zalaegerszeg participated in that season's editions of the Magyar Kupa.

== Squad ==
Squad at end of season

Note: Flags indicate national team as defined under FIFA eligibility rules; some limited exceptions apply. Players may hold more than one non-FIFA nationality.

No.	Pos.	Nation	Player
1	GK	HUN	Zoltán Varga
2	DF	HUN	Gergely Kocsárdi
3	MF	HUN	István Rácz
5	DF	HUN	Vilmos Sebők
6	DF	SLO	Klemen Bingo
7	MF	HUN	András Kaj
8	FW	ROU	Radu Sabo
9	FW	HUN	Tibor Montvai
10	FW	HUN	József Sebők
11	DF	HUN	Zoltán Vasas
13	MF	HUN	Miklós Lendvai
14	FW	HUN	Gábor Sági
15	DF	HUN	László Kónya
16	MF	HUN	Lajos Nagy
17	DF	HUN	Zsolt Csóka
18	DF	HUN	Zoltán Sámson

No.	Pos.	Nation	Player
19	MF	HUN	Béla Koplárovics
21	MF	HUN	József Bozsik
22	GK	HUN	Árpád Milinte
23	MF	HUN	György Józsi
26	DF	HUN	Norbert Kállai
27	MF	HUN	Krisztián Kottán
35	DF	HUN	Péter Németh
66	FW	HUN	Tamás Molnár
77	MF	HUN	Balázs Molnár
86	MF	HUN	Szilveszter Ágoston
87	MF	HUN	Gábor Simonfalvi
88	FW	SRB	Saša Bogunović
99	MF	HUN	András Horváth
—	MF	HUN	Ádám Billege
—	MF	HUN	Tibor Palkó

== Competitions ==
=== Overview ===
Competition	First match	Last match	Starting round	Final position	Record							
Competition	First match	Last match	Starting round	Final position	Pld	W	D	L	GF	GA	GD	Win %
Nemzeti Bajnokság I	30 July 2005	3 June 2006	Matchday 1	11th	30	9	8	13	42	47	−5	30.00
Magyar Kupa	10 September 2005	12 November 2005	Second round	Round of 16	4	2	0	2	11	9	+2	50.00
Total					34	11	8	15	53	56	−3	32.35

Source: Competitions

=== Nemzeti Bajnokság I ===
==== League table ====
Pos	Team	Pld	W	D	L	GF	GA	GD	Pts	Qualification or relegation
9	Győr	30	9	9	12	47	50	−3	36	
10	Sopron	30	9	8	13	39	39	0	35	Qualification for Intertoto Cup second round
11	Zalaegerszeg	30	9	8	13	42	47	−5	35	
12	Pécs	30	8	9	13	37	41	−4	33	
13	Honvéd	30	8	9	13	33	52	−19	33	

Source: RSSSF

==== Results summary ====
Overall								Home						Away					
Pld	W	D	L	GF	GA	GD	Pts	W	D	L	GF	GA	GD	W	D	L	GF	GA	GD
30	9	8	13	42	47	−5	35	7	4	4	29	17	+12	2	4	9	13	30	−17

Source: Competitions

==== Results by round ====
Round	1	2	3	4	5	6	7	8	9	10	11	12	13	14	15	16	17	18	19	20	21	22	23	24	25	26	27	28	29	30
Ground	A	H	A	H	A	H	A	A	H	A	H	A	H	A	H	H	A	H	A	H	A	H	H	A	H	A	H	A	H	A
Result	L	W	W	W	L	W	L	D	L	L	L	L	W	L	L	W	W	D	D	D	L	D	L	L	D	L	W	D	W	D
Position	11	7	5	5	5	5	5	5	7	8	9	10	8	8	11	9	7	8	10	10	10	10	11	12	12	13	12	12	10	11
Points	0	3	6	9	9	12	12	13	13	13	13	13	16	16	16	19	22	23	24	25	25	26	26	26	27	27	30	31	34	35

A = Away; H = Home; W = Win; D = Draw; L = Loss

==== Matches ====
30 July 2005 1	Debrecen	2–1	Zalaegerszeg	Debrecen
19:00 CEST (UTC+2)	Sidibe 5'; Vukmir (yellow card) 72'; Bogdanović 76'	Report	Kriston (yellow card) 61'; V. Sebők (yellow card) 69'; Montvai 78'; Kocsárdi (yellow card) 81'	Stadium: Oláh Gábor utcai Stadion; Attendance: 7,500; Referee: Szabolcs Saskőy; Assistant referees: Székely, Heibl

6 August 2005 2	Zalaegerszeg	3–0	Tatabánya	Zalaegerszeg
19:00 CEST (UTC+2)	V. Sebők 19' (pen.), 60' (pen.); Spalević (red card) 45'; Józsi 69'	Report	Filó (yellow card) 18' (yellow-red card) 60'; Kerényi (yellow card) 22'; Márkus (yellow card) 74'	Stadium: ZTE Arena; Attendance: 3,500; Referee: József Erdős; Assistant referees: P. Kovács, Z. Kovács

20 August 2005 3	Sopron	0–1	Zalaegerszeg	Sopron
19:00 CEST (UTC+2)	Costișor (yellow card) 8'; Vén (yellow card) 28'; Demjén (yellow card) 28'; Lazić (yellow card) 54'	Report	Józsi (yellow card) 32'; Kocsárdi (yellow card) 43', (goal) 47'; László (yellow card) 76'	Stadium: Káposztás utcai Stadion; Attendance: 2,700; Referee: Ferenc Bede; Assistant referees: T. Vámos, Z. Szalai

27 August 2005 4	Zalaegerszeg	3–2	Ferencváros	Zalaegerszeg
19:00 CEST (UTC+2)	Csóka 8'; Koplárovics 14'; Kriston 24'	Report	Jovánczai (yellow card); Csurka (yellow card); Lipcsei 9'; Budovinszky 75', (yellow card)	Stadium: ZTE Arena; Attendance: 9,000; Referee: Péter Solmyosi; Assistant referees: G. Takács, I. Mészáros; Fourth official: Szilasi

17 September 2005 5	Honvéd	4–0	Zalaegerszeg	Budapest
19:00 CEST (UTC+2)	Z. Kovács II (yellow card) 2'; Dancs 44'; Miró 66'; Z. Takács 69'; Alves 88' (pen.)	Report	Bojović (yellow card) 7'	Stadium: Bozsik József Stadion; Attendance: 1,500; Referee: János Megyebíró; Assistant referees: Szpisják, P. Tóth

24 September 2005 6	Zalaegerszeg	5–0	Pápa	Zalaegerszeg
19:00 CEST (UTC+2)	V. Sebők 19' (pen.), 69' (pen.); Sabo 48'; Montvai 56'; Spasojević 84', (yellow card) 85'	Report	Kovrig (yellow card) 19'; Lipták (yellow card) 20'; Remili (yellow card) 76'; Honma (yellow card) 87'; Facskó (yellow card) 89'	Stadium: ZTE Arena; Attendance: 4,500; Referee: Zoltán Szarka; Assistant referees: P. Szabó, V. Kovács

1 October 2005 7	Fehérvár	1–0	Zalaegerszeg	Székesfehérvár
18:00 CEST (UTC+2)	Kuttor 3'	Report	Bojović (yellow card) 36'; V. Sebők (yellow card) 43'; C. Balog (yellow card) 52'	Stadium: Sóstói Stadion; Attendance: 6,000; Referee: Ferenc Bede; Assistant referees: Tompos, L. Tóth L.

15 October 2005 8	Kaposvár	1–1	Zalaegerszeg	Kaposvár
18:00 CEST (UTC+2)	Bank (yellow card) 8'; Petrók (yellow card) 30'; Zahorecz 50' (pen.), (yellow card) 70'; Zsolnai (yellow card) 65'	Report	Sabo 55'	Stadium: Rákóczi Stadion; Attendance: 3,000; Referee: István Vad; Assistant referees: Székely, Vámos

23 October 2005 9	Zalaegerszeg	3–4	MTK	Zalaegerszeg
11:30 CEST (UTC+2)	Kocsárdi (yellow card) 5'; László 33'; V. Sebők (yellow card) 49', (goal) 90+3' (pen.); Montvai (yellow card) 50'; Sabo 64'	Report	Pollák (yellow card) 1'; Hrepka 5', 66'; Czvitkovics 38'; Rodenbücher (yellow card) 75'; Bori 84'	Stadium: ZTE Arena; Attendance: 4,000; Referee: Viktor Kassai; Assistant referees: G. Erős, Z. Tompos

29 October 2005 10	Győr	2–1	Zalaegerszeg	Győr
18:00 CEST (UTC+2)	Stark (yellow card) 5'; R. Horváth (yellow card) 32'; Kenesei 38'; Priskin 81'	Report	Balog (yellow card) 28'; Kozmér (yellow card) 37'; Bojović (yellow card) 70'; Đorović 87'	Stadium: Stadion ETO; Attendance: 1,000; Referee: Szabolcs Saskőy; Assistant referees: Székely, Heibl

6 November 2005 11	Zalaegerszeg	1–3	Újpest	Zalaegerszeg
11:30 CET (UTC+1)	V. Sebők 59' (pen.)	Report	Rajczi 22'; V. Sebők 65' (o.g.); Csóka 74' (o.g.)	Stadium: ZTE Arena; Attendance: 3,000; Referee: Tamás Arany; Assistant referees: Dr. Szabó, I. A. Nagy

19 November 2005 12	Diósgyőr	3–0	Zalaegerszeg	Miskolc
17:00 CET (UTC+1)	Z. Pintér (yellow card) 4'; F. Horváth 34' (pen.); Vitelki 70'; Katona (yellow card) 82'; Sipeki 86'	Report	Spalević (yellow card) 14'; Kriston (yellow card) 34'; Kaj (yellow card) 53'; Kozmér (yellow card) 73'	Stadium: Diósgyőri Stadion; Attendance: 5,000; Referee: Zsolt Szabó; Assistant referees: Kispál, Dr. Hegyi

26 November 2005 13	Zalaegerszeg	3–0	Vasas	Zalaegerszeg
17:00 CET (UTC+1)	Montvai 14'; Kriston 16'; V. Sebők 75' (pen.)	Report	Salamon (yellow card) 77'; Lázok (yellow card) 86'	Stadium: ZTE Arena; Attendance: 2,200; Referee: József Erdős; Assistant referees: Z. Kovács, Z. Szalai

3 December 2005 14	Rákospalota	2–1	Zalaegerszeg	Budapest
13:00 CET (UTC+1)	Torma 31'; Cseri 44'	Report	Montvai 29'; Bojović (yellow card) 73'	Stadium: Budai II. László Stadion; Attendance: 800; Referee: Tamás Arany; Assistant referees: L. Tóth L., T. Vígh

10 December 2005 15	Zalaegerszeg	1–4	Pécs	Zalaegerszeg
15:00 CET (UTC+1)	Sabo 48'; Csóka (yellow card) 66'	Report	Szabados 36'; Balaskó 58'; Szekeres 68'; Kalina 81'	Stadium: ZTE Arena; Attendance: 2,500; Referee: Szabolcs Saskőy; Assistant referees: Székely, Heibl

24 February 2006 16	Zalaegerszeg	2–0	Debrecen	Zalaegerszeg
19:00 CET (UTC+1)	Kónya 26'; J. Sebők 85', (yellow card) 90'	Report	Nikolov (yellow card) 86'; Komlósi (yellow card) 90'	Stadium: ZTE Arena; Attendance: 2,500; Referee: Tamás Arany; Assistant referees: P. Szabó, Z. Kovács

4 March 2006 17	Tatabánya	0–1	Zalaegerszeg	Tatabánya
14:30 CET (UTC+1)		Report	L. Nagy 78'	Stadium: Városi Stadion; Attendance: 2,500; Referee: Attila Hanacsek; Assistant referees: Szpisják, P. Tóth

11 March 2006 18	Zalaegerszeg	2–2	Sopron	Zalaegerszeg
15:00 CET (UTC+1)	V. Sebők 38'; J. Sebők 42'; Lendvai (yellow card) 45' (yellow-red card) 87'; Kaj (yellow card) 90+1'	Report	Sira 15'; Silvestri (yellow card) 32'; Bagoly (yellow card) 42'; A. Horváth I 66'	Stadium: ZTE Arena; Attendance: 5,500; Referee: István Vad; Assistant referees: G. Takács, Z. Szalai

17 March 2006 19	Ferencváros	2–2	Zalaegerszeg	Budapest
19:00 CET (UTC+1)	Jovánczai 16' (pen.), 61' (pen.); Zo. Balog (yellow card) 18'	Report	V. Sebők 19' (pen.); Perić 59'; Vasas (yellow card) 60'; B. Molnár (yellow card) 66'	Stadium: Üllői úti Stadion; Attendance: 4,297; Referee: Mihály Fábián; Assistant referees: G. Ortó, T. Márkus

25 March 2006 20	Zalaegerszeg	0–0	Honvéd	Zalaegerszeg
17:00 CET (UTC+1)	B. Molnár (yellow card) 74'	Report	Zambo (yellow card) 60'; Bozori (yellow card) 77'	Stadium: ZTE Arena; Attendance: 5,000; Referee: Ferenc Bede; Assistant referees: T. Vámos, Z. Kovács

1 April 2006 21	Pápa	2–1	Zalaegerszeg	Pápa
17:00 CEST (UTC+2)	L. Gaál (yellow card) 40'; D'Arrigo (yellow card) 61'; Mumba 71'; Lipták (yellow card) 74'; Kincses 85'	Report	Perić (red card) 36'; J. Sebők 77', (yellow card) 84'; Bingo (yellow card) 86'; Kocsárdi (yellow card) 90'	Stadium: Perutz Stadion; Attendance: 2,000; Referee: Csaba Imre Sápi; Assistant referees: I. A. Nagy, L. Tóth L.

8 April 2006 22	Zalaegerszeg	1–1	Fehérvár	Zalaegerszeg
17:00 CEST (UTC+2)	Kónya 13', (yellow card) 85'; B. Molnár (yellow card) 42'; Józsi (yellow card) 44'; Kocsárdi (yellow card) 66'; A. Horváth II (yellow card) 86'	Report	Alumona 5'; Csizmadia (yellow card) 50'; Dajić (yellow card) 60'	Stadium: ZTE Arena; Attendance: 5,000; Referee: Péter Solymosi; Assistant referees: Takács, P. Kovács

15 April 2006 23	Zalaegerszeg	0–1	Kaposvár	Zalaegerszeg
18:00 CEST (UTC+2)	Kocsárdi (yellow card) 53'; Csóka (yellow card) 80'	Report	Zahorecz (yellow card) 38', (goal) 80' (pen.)	Stadium: ZTE Arena; Attendance: 3,800; Referee: Károly Török; Assistant referees: Tompos, Vámos

22 April 2006 24	MTK	6–3	Zalaegerszeg	Budapest
18:00 CEST (UTC+2)	Kanta 2' (pen.), 16' (pen.), 37'; Végh (yellow card) 22'; Czvitkovics 24', 33'; L. Horváth 30', (yellow card) 90+1'; Selei (yellow card) 65'	Report	Simonfalvi (yellow card) 16'; V. Sebők 22' (pen.), (yellow card) 81'; Kónya (yellow card) 36'; Lambulić 55' (o.g.); Kottán 83'	Stadium: Hidegkuti Nándor Stadion; Attendance: 1,000; Referee: Mihály Fábián; Assistant referees: Z. Szalai, Heibl

29 April 2006 25	Zalaegerszeg	0–0	Győr	Zalaegerszeg
18:00 CEST (UTC+2)	V. Sebők (yellow card) 4'; Perić (yellow card) 26'; J. Sebők (yellow card) 74'	Report	G. Varga (yellow card) 38'; Zsók (yellow card) 43'; Bajzát (yellow card) 53'; Priskin (red card) 70'	Stadium: ZTE Arena; Attendance: 1,500; Referee: Szabolcs Saskőy; Assistant referees: Székely, Z. Kovács

7 May 2006 26	Újpest	5–1	Zalaegerszeg	Budapest
11:30 CEST (UTC+2)	Z. Kovács I 24', 75'; Rajczi 26', 86'; N. Tóth 30' (pen.); Tisza (yellow card) 34' (yellow-red card) 60'; Erős (yellow card) 45'	Report	Kaj (yellow card) 45'; V. Sebők 51' (pen.), (yellow card) 61'; Sági (yellow card) 54'	Stadium: Szusza Ferenc Stadion; Attendance: 4,021; Referee: János Megyebíró; Assistant referees: R. Kispál, Z. Szalai

13 May 2006 27	Zalaegerszeg	2–0	Diósgyőr	Zalaegerszeg
19:00 CEST (UTC+2)	Bogunović 21'; J. Sebők 25'	Report	Mogyorósi (yellow card) 30'; Szögedi (yellow card) 76'; Almási (yellow card) 82'	Stadium: ZTE Arena; Attendance: 2,200; Referee: Tamás Bognár; Assistant referees: Dr. P. Szabó, Lémon

20 May 2006 28	Vasas	0–0	Zalaegerszeg	Budapest
18:00 CEST (UTC+2)	O. Szabó (yellow card) 89'	Report	J. Sebők (yellow card) 18'; Vasas (yellow card) 75'	Stadium: Illovszky Rudolf Stadion; Attendance: 1,000; Referee: Sándor Andó-Szabó; Assistant referees: Hegyi, I. Albert

27 May 2006 29	Zalaegerszeg	3–0	Rákospalota	Zalaegerszeg
19:00 CEST (UTC+2)	J. Sebők 6'; Józsi 12', 72'; Csóka (yellow card) 43'	Report	Kapcsos (yellow card) 18'; Földvári (yellow card) 67'	Stadium: ZTE Arena; Attendance: 2,200; Referee: Ferenc Bede; Assistant referees: Székely, Viszokai

3 June 2006 30	Pécs	0–0	Zalaegerszeg	Pécs
18:00 CEST (UTC+2)	Luczek (yellow card) 40'; Balaskó (yellow card) 45'; Sipos (yellow card) 75'; Bajúsz (yellow card) 82'	Report	Lendvai (red card) 54'; Józsi (yellow card) 62'	Stadium: Stadion PMFC; Attendance: 600; Referee: Szabolcs Szilasi; Assistant referees: P. Hegyi, O. Lémon

=== Magyar Kupa ===
10 September 2005 Second round	Nagyatád	0–5	Zalaegerszeg	Nagyatád
15:00 CEST (UTC+2)	J. Kiss (yellow card); Prucsi (yellow card); J. Horváth (yellow card)	Report	Kriston (yellow card) , Koplárovics; Józsi; Sabo; L. Nagy	Stadium: Nagyatádi Sportpálya; Attendance: 400; Referee: Tatai; Assistant referees: Z. Iványi, Inhoff

21 September 2005 Third round	Törökbálint	1–4	Zalaegerszeg	Törökbálint
15:30 CEST (UTC+2)	A. Tóth 35' (pen.)	Report	Spalević (yellow card); Józsi (yellow card) 24'; Kriston (yellow card) 59'; Sabo (yellow card) 67'; L. Nagy (yellow card) 76'	Stadium: Alsóerdősor utcai Labdarúgópálya; Attendance: 700; Referee: Tamás Arany; Assistant referees: G. Kovács, Viszokai

==== Round of 16 ====
26 October 2005 First leg	Zalaegerszeg	1–5	Sopron	Zalaegerszeg
17:00 CEST (UTC+2)	Spalević (yellow card); V. Sebők 76' (pen.)	Report	Ivancsics (yellow card); Costișor 15', (yellow card); Csordás 65', 67'; Signori 71', 83'	Stadium: ZTE Arena; Attendance: 1,200; Referee: Péter Solmyosi; Assistant referees: G. Takács, Lémon

12 November 2005 Second leg	Sopron	3–1 (8–2 agg.)	Zalaegerszeg	Sopron
17:00 CET (UTC+1)	Sifter 32'; Csordás 50'; Cigan 79'	Report	Kaj (yellow card); Sabo 76'	Stadium: Káposztás utcai Stadion; Attendance: 2,000; Referee: Zoltán Szarka; Assistant referees: Dr. P. Szabó, Boda
Note: Sopron won 8–2 on aggregate.
