= 2005–06 FC Sopron season =

Sopron
2005–06 season
- Owner: Marius Vizer (51%); Local government (20%); Zoltán Antók (16%); SC Sopron (9%); Gábor Gőbl (4%)
- Manager: Attila Pintér (until 11 July 2005); János Csank (from 12 July to 25 September); Tibor Selymes (from 25 September to 6 February 2006); Tamás Nagy (from 6 February to 9 February); Csaba László (from 13 February to 17 February); Dario Bonetti (from 17 February to 30 April); László Vass (interim, from 30 April)
- Stadium: Káposztás utcai Stadion
- Nemzeti Bajnokság I: 10th
- Magyar Kupa: Quarter-finals
- Szuperkupa: Runners-up
- UEFA Cup: Second qualifying round
- Highest home attendance: 4,200 v Győr (1 April 2006, Nemzeti Bajnokság I)
- Lowest home attendance: 1,500 (multiple Nemzeti Bajnokság I matches)
- Average home league attendance: 2,880
- Biggest win: 5–1 v Zalaegerszeg (Away, 26 October 2005, Magyar Kupa); 5–1 v Tatabánya (Home, 26 November 2005, Nemzeti Bajnokság I)
- Biggest defeat: 0–3 v Metalurh Donetsk (Home, 11 August 2005, UEFA Cup); 0–3 v MTK (Home, 17 September 2005, Nemzeti Bajnokság I)

The 2005–06 season was Football Club Sopron's 6th competitive season, 6th consecutive season in the Nemzeti Bajnokság I and 63rd season in existence as a football club. In addition to the domestic league, Sopron participated in that season's editions of the Magyar Kupa, the Szuperkupa and the UEFA Cup.

== Squad ==
Squad at end of season

Note: Flags indicate national team as defined under FIFA eligibility rules; some limited exceptions apply. Players may hold more than one non-FIFA nationality.

No.	Pos.	Nation	Player
1	GK	HUN	Balázs Rabóczki
3	DF	ROU	Marius Radu
4	DF	HUN	András László
5	DF	ROU	Ion Ibric
6	FW	HUN	István Sira
7	MF	HUN	András Horváth
8	FW	HUN	Róbert Feczesin
9	FW	ROU	Cristian Cigan
11	MF	HUN	Tamás Sifter
12	GK	HUN	Tamás Takács
13	FW	ROU	Alin Coțan
15	DF	ROU	Alexandru Costisor

No.	Pos.	Nation	Player
17	MF	HUN	Zoltán Csontos
18	MF	HUN	Gellért Ivancsics
19	MF	ITA	Nicola Silvestri
21		HUN	István Török
23	MF	ROU	Cristian Lucian Munteanu
25	MF	HUN	Miklós Fleischhacker
26	DF	HUN	Gábor Bagoly
27	FW	HUN	Gábor Demjén
29	FW	HUN	László Legoza
30	FW	HUN	Botond Birtalan
33	GK	HUN	Tamás Kozma
44	DF	HUN	Pál Lázár

== Competitions ==
=== Overview ===
Competition	First match	Last match	Starting round	Final position	Record							
Competition	First match	Last match	Starting round	Final position	Pld	W	D	L	GF	GA	GD	Win %
Nemzeti Bajnokság I	30 July 2005	2 June 2006	Matchday 1	10th	30	9	8	13	39	39	+0	30.00
Magyar Kupa	21 September 2005	29 March 2006	Third round	Quarter-finals	5	3	1	1	10	4	+6	60.00
Szuperkupa	16 July 2005	20 July 2005	Final	Runners-up	2	1	0	1	4	5	−1	50.00
UEFA Cup	11 August 2005	25 August 2005	Second qualifying round	Second qualifying round	2	0	0	2	1	5	−4	0.00
Total					39	13	9	17	54	53	+1	33.33

Source: Competitions

=== Szuperkupa ===
Sopron, as Magyar Kupa winners in the previous season, played against Debrecen in the 2005 Szuperkupa, who themselves won the Nemzeti Bajnokság I.

16 July 2005 First leg	Sopron	4–2	Debrecen	Sopron
20:00 CEST (UTC+2)	Costișor (yellow card) 21'; Coțan 29', 34'; Lazić 66' (pen.); A. Horváth I 77'	Report	Habi (yellow card) 6'; Z. Kiss I (yellow card) 32', (goal) 72'; T. Sándor 85'	Stadium: Káposztás utcai Stadion; Attendance: 2,600; Referee: József Erdős; Assistant referees: Kispál, G. Takács

20 July 2005 Second leg	Debrecen	3–0 (5–4 agg.)	Sopron	Debrecen
20:00 CEST (UTC+2)	Nikolov (yellow card) 22'; Kerekes 31'; T. Sándor 34'; P. Máté II (yellow card) 37', (goal) 55'; Habi (yellow card) 44'	Report	A. Horváth I (yellow card) 40'; Ibric (yellow card) 64'; Zo. Fehér (yellow card) 86'	Stadium: Oláh Gábor utcai Stadion; Attendance: 5,500; Referee: Ferenc Bede; Assistant referees: Tompos, Ortó
Note: Debrecen won 5–4 on aggregate.

=== Nemzeti Bajnokság I ===
==== League table ====
Pos	Team	Pld	W	D	L	GF	GA	GD	Pts	Qualification or relegation
8	Diósgyőr	30	10	7	13	33	44	−11	37	
9	Győr	30	9	9	12	47	50	−3	36	
10	Sopron	30	9	8	13	39	39	0	35	Qualification for Intertoto Cup second round
11	Zalaegerszeg	30	9	8	13	42	47	−5	35	
12	Pécs	30	8	9	13	37	41	−4	33	

Source: RSSSF

==== Results summary ====
Overall								Home						Away					
Pld	W	D	L	GF	GA	GD	Pts	W	D	L	GF	GA	GD	W	D	L	GF	GA	GD
30	9	8	13	39	39	0	35	7	4	4	22	14	+8	2	4	9	17	25	−8

Source: Competitions

==== Matches ====
30 July 2005 1	Sopron	1–1	Honvéd	Sopron
19:00 CEST (UTC+2)	Costișor (yellow card) 41'; Lazić (yellow card) 52', (goal) 65' (pen.)	Report	Zana (yellow card) 1'; Vadócz 57' (pen.); Z. Kovács II (yellow card) 59'	Stadium: Káposztás utcai Stadion; Attendance: 3,500; Referee: Tamás Arany; Assistant referees: P. Szabó, Z. Kovács

6 August 2005 2	Pápa	1–2	Sopron	Pápa
19:00 CEST (UTC+2)	Lipták (yellow card) 16'; Kovrig (yellow card) 24', (goal) 89' (pen.); Szkukalek (yellow card) 43'; Lászka (yellow card) 49'	Report	A. Horváth I (yellow card) 14', (goal) 41'; Zo. Fehér (yellow card) 24'; Bagoly (yellow card) 35'; Ibric 45', (yellow card) 90+2'	Stadium: Perutz Stadion; Attendance: 2,200; Referee: Zsolt Szabó; Assistant referees: I. Mészáros, Hegyi

20 August 2005 3	Sopron	0–1	Zalaegerszeg	Sopron
19:00 CEST (UTC+2)	Costișor (yellow card) 8'; Vén (yellow card) 28'; Demjén (yellow card) 28'; Lazić (yellow card) 54'	Report	Józsi (yellow card) 32'; Kocsárdi (yellow card) 43', (goal) 47'; László (yellow card) 76'	Stadium: Káposztás utcai Stadion; Attendance: 2,700; Referee: Ferenc Bede; Assistant referees: T. Vámos, Z. Szalai

28 August 2005 4	Kaposvár	2–0	Sopron	Kaposvár
19:00 CEST (UTC+2)	Zsolnai 40'; Nagypál (yellow card) 42'; P. Máté I 54'	Report	Csordás (yellow card) 28'; Ibric (yellow card) 45'; Sira (yellow card) 72'	Stadium: Rákóczi Stadion; Attendance: 2,500; Referee: Zoltán Szarka; Assistant referees: Z. Kovács, Heibl

17 September 2005 5	Sopron	0–3	MTK	Sopron
19:00 CEST (UTC+2)	Bagoly (yellow card) 40'; Coțan (yellow card) 70'; Sifter (yellow card) 78'; Vén (yellow card) 79'; Landerl (yellow card) 80'	Report	Czvitkovics 15'; Hrepka 32', 52'; Lambulić (yellow card) 36'; Selei (yellow card) 86'	Stadium: Káposztás utcai Stadion; Attendance: 1,800; Referee: János Makai; Assistant referees: L. Varga II, Z. Kovács

24 September 2005 6	Győr	2–1	Sopron	Győr
19:00 CEST (UTC+2)	O. Vincze 6' (pen.); Kenesei 26'	Report	T. Horváth I (yellow card) 5'; Landerl 44'; Bagoly (yellow card) 48'; Vén (yellow card) 67'	Stadium: Stadion ETO; Attendance: 1,500; Referee: Sándor Gergely; Assistant referees: I. Mészáros, L. Varga II

1 October 2005 7	Sopron	1–1	Újpest	Sopron
18:00 CEST (UTC+2)	Landerl 4'; Coțan (yellow card) 24'	Report	Demjén 2' (o.g.); Vlaszák (red card) 48'	Stadium: Káposztás utcai Stadion; Attendance: 3,200; Referee: Tamás Arany; Assistant referees: T. Vámos, Z. Kovács

15 October 2005 8	Diósgyőr	1–1	Sopron	Miskolc
18:00 CEST (UTC+2)	Gašpar 26'	Report	Gašpar 3' (o.g.); A. Horváth I (yellow card) 41'; Bagoly (yellow card) 67'; Sifter (yellow card) 83'	Stadium: Diósgyőri Stadion; Attendance: 5,500; Referee: Csaba Imre Sápi; Assistant referees: L. Tóth L., T. Vígh

22 October 2005 9	Sopron	2–0	Vasas	Sopron
18:00 CEST (UTC+2)	Coțan 53'; Cigan (yellow card) 64'; Bagoly 73'	Report	A. Tóth (yellow card) 21'; Z. Molnár (yellow card) 41'; H. Rósa (yellow card) 43'; Bárányos (yellow card) 52'	Stadium: Káposztás utcai Stadion; Attendance: 4,000; Referee: Zoltán Szarka; Assistant referees: T. Szabó, Z. Kovács

29 October 2005 10	Rákospalota	1–0	Sopron	Budapest
14:30 CEST (UTC+2)	G. Nagy I (yellow card) 43'; Virágh (yellow card) 76'; G. Horváth I (yellow card) 81'; Polonkai (yellow card) 84'; B. Kovács (yellow card) 87'; Nyerges 90+2' (pen.)	Report	Coțan (yellow card) 41'; Landerl (yellow card) 46'	Stadium: Budai II. László Stadion; Attendance: 1,000; Referee: János Makai; Assistant referees: Ortó, P. Tóth

5 November 2005 11	Sopron	3–1	Pécs	Sopron
18:00 CET (UTC+1)	A. Horváth I (yellow card) 21', (goal) 29', 47'; Costișor (yellow card) 71'; Signori 88'	Report	Balaskó 1', (yellow card) 12'; Bajúsz (yellow card) 48'; Dienes (yellow card) 58'; Szekeres (yellow card) 81'	Stadium: Káposztás utcai Stadion; Attendance: 3,500; Referee: József Erdős; Assistant referees: G. Erős, Kispál

19 November 2005 12	Debrecen	3–1	Sopron	Debrecen
17:00 CET (UTC+1)	Sidibe 5'; Halmosi 10'; Brnović 43' (pen.); Bernáth (yellow card) 68'; Dombi (yellow card) 74'; B. Virág (yellow card) 90'	Report	Bagoly (yellow card) 26'; Coțan (yellow card) 39'; Signori 58' (pen.); Sifter (yellow card) 69'	Stadium: Oláh Gábor utcai Stadion; Attendance: 6,000; Referee: Szabolcs Saskőy; Assistant referees: Székely, Heibl

26 November 2005 13	Sopron	5–1	Tatabánya	Sopron
17:00 CET (UTC+1)	Bagoly 15', 51', 61'; A. Horváth I 28'; Demjén 33'; Zo. Fehér (yellow card) 43'	Report	Kerényi (yellow card) 1'; Márkus 47'; Jerson (yellow card) 75'; Z. Balogh (yellow card) 88'	Stadium: Káposztás utcai Stadion; Attendance: 1,500; Referee: István Vad; Assistant referees: Tompos, Takács

3 December 2005 14	Sopron	1–1	Fehérvár	Sopron
15:00 CET (UTC+1)	Cigan 1'; Bagoly (yellow card) 33'	Report	Simek 31'; Schwarcz (yellow card) 57'	Stadium: Káposztás utcai Stadion; Attendance: 3,300; Referee: Ferenc Bede; Assistant referees: T. Vámos, Z. Szalai

10 December 2005 15	Ferencváros	1–0	Sopron	Budapest
15:00 CET (UTC+1)	Csepregi (yellow card) 41'; Bognár (yellow card) 80'; Zo. Balog 90+2'; Jovánczai (yellow card) 90+3'	Report	Ibric (yellow card) 79'	Stadium: Üllői úti Stadion; Attendance: 2,500; Referee: Mihály Fábián; Assistant referees: Gy. Ortó, T. Márkus

25 February 2006 16	Honvéd	0–3	Sopron	Budapest
16:00 CET (UTC+1)		Report	Signori 17'; László (yellow card) 49'; Bagoly (yellow card) 56'; A. Horváth I 57'; Demjén 83'	Stadium: Bozsik József Stadion; Attendance: 2,000; Referee: Péter Solymosi; Assistant referees: Ortó, T. Márkus

4 March 2006 17	Sopron	2–0	Pápa	Sopron
16:00 CET (UTC+1)	Demjén 37'; Cigan 69'	Report	Stevica (yellow card) 27'	Stadium: Káposztás utcai Stadion; Attendance: 2,600; Referee: József Erdős; Assistant referees: T. Vámos, Z. Tompos

11 March 2006 18	Zalaegerszeg	2–2	Sopron	Zalaegerszeg
15:00 CET (UTC+1)	V. Sebők 38'; J. Sebők 42'; Lendvai (yellow card) 45' (yellow-red card) 87'; Kaj (yellow card) 90+1'	Report	Sira 15'; Silvestri (yellow card) 32'; Bagoly (yellow card) 42'; A. Horváth I 66'	Stadium: ZTE Arena; Attendance: 5,500; Referee: István Vad; Assistant referees: G. Takács, Z. Szalai

18 March 2006 19	Sopron	2–0	Kaposvár	Sopron
16:00 CET (UTC+1)	Bagoly 20'; Sartor (yellow card) 35'; A. Horváth I 38'; Cigan (yellow card) 49'; Rabóczki (yellow card) 77'; Csontos (yellow card) 90+2'	Report	A. Pintér (yellow card) 44'; Kriston (yellow card) 50'; Kovácsevics (yellow card) 58'; Vasiljević (yellow card) 70'	Stadium: Káposztás utcai Stadion; Attendance: 3,000; Referee: Viktor Kassai; Assistant referees: G. Erős, Z. Kovács

25 March 2006 20	MTK	2–0	Sopron	Budapest
17:00 CET (UTC+1)	Zabos 19' (pen.), 82'; Lambulić (yellow card) 90+2'	Report	Munteanu (yellow card) 45'; László (yellow card) 81'	Stadium: Hidegkuti Nándor Stadion; Attendance: 1,000; Referee: Mihály Fábián; Assistant referees: G. Ortó, T. Márkus

1 April 2006 21	Sopron	2–0	Győr	Sopron
15:00 CEST (UTC+2)	A. Horváth I 4' (pen.); Sifter (yellow card) 43'; Radu 50', (yellow card) 62'; Bagoly (yellow card) 80'; Feczesin (yellow card) 86'	Report	Stevanović (yellow card) 4'; O. Vincze (yellow card) 20'; Pusztai (yellow card) 69'	Stadium: Káposztás utcai Stadion; Attendance: 4,200; Referee: Sándor Gergely; Assistant referees: G. Takács, Z. Szalai

8 April 2006 22	Újpest	2–1	Sopron	Budapest
15:00 CEST (UTC+2)	Hullám (yellow card) 10'; Tisza 31'; Erős (yellow card) 61'; Rajczi 78' (pen.)	Report	A. Horváth I 61' (pen.); Coțan (yellow card) 71'; Silvestri (yellow card) 85'; Sifter (yellow card) 90+1'	Stadium: Szusza Ferenc Stadion; Attendance: 4,215; Referee: Viktor Kassai; Assistant referees: Erős, Kelemen

15 April 2006 23	Sopron	2–1	Diósgyőr	Sopron
18:00 CEST (UTC+2)	Radu (yellow card) 16'; Cigan 18'; Signori (yellow card) 35'; Feczesin (yellow card) 49'; A. Horváth I 77', (yellow card) 86'	Report	Halgas (yellow card) 23'; N. Farkas (yellow card) 31'; Binder 87'	Stadium: Káposztás utcai Stadion; Attendance: 3,400; Referee: Zsolt Szabó; Assistant referees: Kispál, Z. Kovács

21 April 2006 24	Vasas	1–1	Sopron	Budapest
19:00 CEST (UTC+2)	Zs. Balog (yellow card) 55'; Csordás 75'	Report	Munteanu 90'	Stadium: Illovszky Rudolf Stadion; Attendance: 2,500; Referee: Tamás Arany; Assistant referees: Vámos, I. Tóth

29 April 2006 25	Sopron	0–1	Rákospalota	Sopron
18:00 CEST (UTC+2)		Report	Török 1'; G. Horváth I (yellow card) 4'; Somorjai (yellow card) 8'; B. Kovács (yellow card) 50'	Stadium: Káposztás utcai Stadion; Attendance: 1,500; Referee: Péter Solymosi; Assistant referees: L. Varga II, T. Deák

6 May 2006 26	Pécs	2–1	Sopron	Pécs
19:00 CEST (UTC+2)	Vujic 48'; Bajúsz 52'	Report	Ivancsics (yellow card) 21'; A. Horváth I (yellow card) 56'; Ibric 74'	Stadium: Stadion PMFC; Attendance: 2,000; Referee: Szabolcs Saskőy; Assistant referees: Székely, Heibl

13 May 2006 27	Sopron	0–2	Debrecen	Sopron
19:00 CEST (UTC+2)	A. Horváth I (yellow card) 58'	Report	Sidibe 33'; Bernáth (yellow card) 44'; Halmosi 86'	Stadium: Káposztás utcai Stadion; Attendance: 3,200; Referee: Péter Solymosi; Assistant referees: Varga II, Kispál

20 May 2006 28	Tatabánya	3–2	Sopron	Tatabánya
18:00 CEST (UTC+2)	Márkus 17', 53'; Filó (yellow card) 32'; Kouemaha 85'	Report	Costișor 11'; Rajnay 24' (o.g.); Sifter (yellow card) 40'; Demjén (yellow card) 46'	Stadium: Városi Stadion; Attendance: 4,000; Referee: József Erdős; Assistant referees: P. Szabó, R. Kispál

27 May 2006 29	Fehérvár	2–2	Sopron	Székesfehérvár
18:00 CEST (UTC+2)	Sitku 11' (pen.), 62', (yellow card) 55'; Schwarcz (yellow card) 34'; B. Farkas II (yellow card) 90+1'	Report	Costișor (yellow card) 22'; Bagoly 38'; A. Horváth I 70' (pen.)	Stadium: Sóstói Stadion; Attendance: 6,000; Referee: Károly Török; Assistant referees: Márkus, Ortó

2 June 2006 30	Sopron	1–1	Ferencváros	Sopron
19:00 CEST (UTC+2)	Bagoly (yellow card) 53', (goal) 87'; A. Horváth I (yellow card) 89'	Report	Bajevski 14'; Laczkó (yellow card) 53'	Stadium: Káposztás utcai Stadion; Attendance: 1,800; Referee: Tamás Arany; Assistant referees: Z. Kovács, P. Szabó

=== Magyar Kupa ===
21 September 2005 Third round	Ajka	1–2	Sopron	Ajka
15:30 CEST (UTC+2)	P. Finta (yellow card); Márton (yellow card); Garai 13'	Report	Bagoly (yellow card); Zo. Fehér (yellow card); Csordás 40', 41'	Stadium: Városi Szabadidő -és Sportcentrum; Attendance: 600; Referee: Szarka; Assistant referees: Boda, Komláti

==== Round of 16 ====
26 October 2005 First leg	Zalaegerszeg	1–5	Sopron	Zalaegerszeg
17:00 CEST (UTC+2)	Spalević (yellow card); V. Sebők 76' (pen.)	Report	Ivancsics (yellow card); Costișor 15', (yellow card); Csordás 65', 67'; Signori 71', 83'	Stadium: ZTE Arena; Attendance: 1,200; Referee: Péter Solmyosi; Assistant referees: G. Takács, Lémon

12 November 2005 Second leg	Sopron	3–1 (8–2 agg.)	Zalaegerszeg	Sopron
17:00 CET (UTC+1)	Sifter 32'; Csordás 50'; Cigan 79'	Report	Kaj (yellow card); Sabo 76'	Stadium: Káposztás utcai Stadion; Attendance: 2,000; Referee: Zoltán Szarka; Assistant referees: Dr. P. Szabó, Boda
Note: Sopron won 8–2 on aggregate.

==== Quarter-finals ====
22 March 2006 First leg	Sopron	0–0	Honvéd	Sopron
17:00 CET (UTC+1)	Sartor (yellow card) 31'; László (yellow card) 34'; A. Horváth I (yellow card) 60'	Report	Pomper (yellow card) 21'; Venczel (red card) 34'; Z. Kovács II (yellow card) 79'; I. Tóth (yellow card) 84'	Stadium: Káposztás utcai Stadion; Attendance: 2,600; Referee: Zsolt Szabó; Assistant referees: Kispál, P. Szabó

29 March 2006 Second leg	Honvéd	1–0 (1–0 agg.)	Sopron	Budapest
18:00 CEST (UTC+2)	Dancs (yellow card) 26'; Z. Kovács II (yellow card) 35'; Schrancz 83'	Report	Bagoly (yellow card) 37'; Z. Kiss II (yellow card) 76'; Sartor (yellow card) 90+2'	Stadium: Bozsik József Stadion; Attendance: 1,500; Referee: Csaba Imre Sápi; Assistant referees: L. Tóth. L., Kelemen
Note: Honvéd won 1–0 on aggregate.

=== UEFA Cup ===
==== Qualifying rounds ====
===== Second qualifying round =====
11 August 2005 First leg	Sopron (Hungary)	0–3	(Ukraine) Metalurh Donetsk	Sopron, Hungary
20:30 CEST (UTC+2)	Bagoly (yellow card) 38'	Report	Florea (yellow card) 36'; Checher (yellow card) 42'; Shyshchenko 52'; Melikyan (yellow card) 82'; Oleksienko 87', 90'	Stadium: Káposztás utcai Stadion; Attendance: 4,000

25 August 2005 Second leg	Metalurh Donetsk (Ukraine)	2–1 (5–1 agg.)	(Hungary) Sopron	Donetsk, Ukraine
19:00 EEST (UTC+3)	Checher (yellow card) 34'; Zotov 56'; Oleksienko 90' (pen.)	Report	Bagoly (yellow card) 64'; Hanák (yellow card) 68'; Florea 88' (o.g.)	Stadium: Shakhtar Stadium; Attendance: 12,000
Note: Metalurh Donetsk won 5–1 on aggregate.
