= 2005–06 Pécsi MFC season =

Pécs
2005–06 season
- Manager: József Ott (until 27 September 2005); Ferenc Keszei (from 27 September 2005)
- Stadium: Stadion PMFC
- Nemzeti Bajnokság I: 12th
- Magyar Kupa: Quarter-finals
- Highest home attendance: 4,000 v Ferencváros (19 November 2005, Nemzeti Bajnokság I)
- Lowest home attendance: 500 (multiple competitive matches)
- Average home league attendance: 2,053
- Biggest win: 5–0 v Diósgyőr (Home, 17 September 2005, Nemzeti Bajnokság I); 5–0 v Pápa (Home, 3 December 2005, Nemzeti Bajnokság I)
- Biggest defeat: 1–5 v Újpest (Away, 27 August 2005, Nemzeti Bajnokság I)

The 2005–06 season was Pécsi Mecsek Football Club's 27th competitive season, 3rd consecutive season in the Nemzeti Bajnokság I and 34th season in existence as a football club. In addition to the domestic league, Pécs participated in that season's editions of the Magyar Kupa.

== Squad ==
Squad at end of season

Note: Flags indicate national team as defined under FIFA eligibility rules; some limited exceptions apply. Players may hold more than one non-FIFA nationality.

No.	Pos.	Nation	Player
1	GK	(Hungary) HUN	Roland Herbert
4	MF	(Hungary) HUN	Norbert Sipos
6	DF	(Romania) ROU	László Tamás
7	MF	(Hungary) HUN	Iván Balaskó
8	MF	(Hungary) HUN	János Sipos
9	FW	(Hungary) HUN	Bence Tarcsa
10	MF	(Hungary) HUN	Dávid Luczek
11	MF	(Hungary) HUN	Árpád Kulcsár
12	GK	(Hungary) HUN	Gergő Csaba
13	MF	(Hungary) HUN	Balázs Berdó
14	DF	(Hungary) HUN	József Szabados
15	MF	(Hungary) HUN	Zoltán Tóth
16	GK	(Hungary) HUN	Csaba Sólyom
17	FW	(Serbia) SRB	Goran Vujic

No.	Pos.	Nation	Player
18	MF	(Hungary) HUN	Levente Lantos
19	DF	(Serbia) SRB	Endre Bajúsz
20	DF	(Hungary) HUN	Zsolt Szekeres
21	MF	(Serbia) SRB	Čedomir Pavičević
22	FW	(Hungary) HUN	Tibor Kalina
24	DF	(Hungary) HUN	János Győri
25	FW	(Hungary) HUN	Zsolt Horváth
26	FW	(Hungary) HUN	Norbert Szabó
27	MF	(Hungary) HUN	Renato Abou Warda
30	FW	(Serbia) SRB	Radivoje Jevdjovic
32	MF	(Hungary) HUN	Lóránd Szatmári
36	DF	(Hungary) HUN	Szabolcs Schindler
74	DF	(Hungary) HUN	András Dienes

== Competitions ==
=== Overview ===
Competition	First match	Last match	Starting round	Final position	Record							
Competition	First match	Last match	Starting round	Final position	Pld	W	D	L	GF	GA	GD	Win %
Nemzeti Bajnokság I	30 July 2005	3 June 2006	Matchday 1	12th	30	8	9	13	37	41	−4	26.67
Magyar Kupa	11 September 2005	22 March 2006	Second round	Quarter-finals	6	2	1	3	9	7	+2	33.33
Total					36	10	10	16	46	48	−2	27.78

Source: Competitions

=== Nemzeti Bajnokság I ===
==== League table ====
Pos	Team	Pld	W	D	L	GF	GA	GD	Pts	Qualification or relegation
10	Sopron	30	9	8	13	39	39	0	35	Qualification for Intertoto Cup second round
11	Zalaegerszeg	30	9	8	13	42	47	−5	35	
12	Pécs	30	8	9	13	37	41	−4	33	
13	Honvéd	30	8	9	13	33	52	−19	33	
14	Rákospalota	30	7	5	18	30	59	−29	26	

Source: RSSSF

==== Results summary ====
Overall								Home						Away					
Pld	W	D	L	GF	GA	GD	Pts	W	D	L	GF	GA	GD	W	D	L	GF	GA	GD
30	8	9	13	37	41	−4	33	7	4	4	23	10	+13	1	5	9	14	31	−17

Source: Competitions

==== Results by round ====
Round	1	2	3	4	5	6	7	8	9	10	11	12	13	14	15	16	17	18	19	20	21	22	23	24	25	26	27	28	29	30
Ground	H	A	H	A	H	A	H	H	A	H	A	H	A	H	A	A	H	A	H	A	H	A	A	H	A	H	A	H	A	H
Result	W	L	L	L	W	L	W	L	L	L	L	D	D	W	W	D	D	D	W	D	D	D	L	L	L	W	L	W	L	D
Position	1	10	11	13	9	9	9	9	10	12	14	13	13	12	10	12	12	12	11	11	11	11	12	13	13	12	13	11	13	12
Points	3	3	3	3	6	6	9	9	9	9	9	10	11	14	17	18	19	20	23	24	25	26	26	26	26	29	29	32	32	33

A = Away; H = Home; W = Win; D = Draw; L = Loss

==== Matches ====
30 July 2005 1	Pécs	2–1	Kaposvár	Pécs
19:00 CEST (UTC+2)	Balaskó 17', 25' (pen.); Szabados (yellow card) 41'; Berdó (yellow card) 50'; N. Sipos (yellow card) 89'	Report	Andruskó (yellow card) 3'; Kovácsevics (yellow card) 59'; P. Szakály 77'	Stadium: Stadion PMFC; Attendance: 2,000; Referee: Ferenc Bede; Assistant referees: Z. Tompos, L. Varga II

6 August 2005 2	MTK	2–0	Pécs	Budapest
19:00 CEST (UTC+2)	Lambulić 50'; Illés 90'	Report	Pavičević (yellow card) 26'; M. Gaál (yellow card) 59'	Stadium: Hidegkuti Nándor Stadion; Attendance: 1,000; Referee: János Megyebíró; Assistant referees: Szpisják, P. Tóth

20 August 2005 3	Pécs	0–1	Győr	Pécs
19:00 CEST (UTC+2)	Schindler (yellow card) 6'; Bajúsz (yellow card) 49'; Gy. Horváth (yellow card) 71'	Report	Zsók (yellow card) 32'; O. Vincze 34' (pen.)	Stadium: Stadion PMFC; Attendance: 2,500; Referee: János Makai; Assistant referees: Hegyi, G. Takács

27 August 2005 4	Újpest	5–1	Pécs	Budapest
19:00 CEST (UTC+2)	Kőhalmi (yellow card); Vaskó (yellow card); Rajczi 25', 38', 70'; Z. Kovács I 34', 62'	Report	Pavičević (yellow card); Balaskó 54' (pen.)	Stadium: Szusza Ferenc Stadion; Attendance: 3,320; Referee: Mihály Fábián; Assistant referees: Márkus, L. Tóth L. Fourth official: Sóthy

17 September 2005 5	Pécs	5–0	Diósgyőr	Pécs
19:00 CEST (UTC+2)	Szekeres 9'; Balaskó (yellow card) 29', (goal) 72'; Schindler 51'; Gy. Horváth 57'; Kulcsár 65'	Report	Halgas (yellow card) 24', (red card) 70'; Siminic (yellow card) 26'; V. Farkas (yellow card) 54'; Vámosi (red card) 61'; Z. Pintér (yellow card) 66', (red card) 90'	Stadium: Stadion PMFC; Attendance: 2,000; Referee: Szabolcs Saskőy; Assistant referees: Székely, Heibl

24 September 2005 6	Vasas	3–0	Pécs	Budapest
19:00 CEST (UTC+2)	Gyánó 32', 78' (pen.), 90+3'; Völgyi (yellow card) 41'	Report	N. Sipos (yellow card) 57'; Szögedi (yellow card) 77'	Stadium: Illovszky Rudolf Stadion; Attendance: 3,000; Referee: István Vad

1 October 2005 7	Pécs	4–0	Rákospalota	Pécs
18:00 CEST (UTC+2)	Kulcsár 49'; Tarcsa 52', 76'; Pavičević 90'	Report		Stadium: Stadion PMFC; Attendance: 1,500; Referee: Sándor Gergely; Assistant referees: L. Varga II, Szalai

15 October 2005 8	Pécs	0–2	Fehérvár	Pécs
18:00 CEST (UTC+2)	Szabados (yellow card) 30'; Schindler (yellow card) 81'	Report	B. Farkas II (yellow card) 35'; Koller 43'; Sitku 89'	Stadium: Stadion PMFC; Attendance: 2,000; Referee: Zsolt Szabó; Assistant referees: Hegyi, Kispál

23 October 2005 9	Debrecen	3–1	Pécs	Debrecen
17:00 CEST (UTC+2)	Sidibe 8'; Brnović 30'; Ferenczi 90'	Report	Pavičević (yellow card) 24'; Szögedi 90+1'	Stadium: Oláh Gábor utcai Stadion; Attendance: 7,000; Referee: István Vad; Assistant referees: Z. Szalai, T. Vígh

29 October 2005 10	Pécs	0–1	Tatabánya	Pécs
18:00 CEST (UTC+2)	Schindler (yellow card) 80'	Report	T. Nagy 19'; Megyesi (yellow card) 32'	Stadium: Stadion PMFC; Attendance: 1,500; Referee: Zoltán Szarka; Assistant referees: P. Szabó, Z. Kovács

5 November 2005 11	Sopron	3–1	Pécs	Sopron
18:00 CET (UTC+1)	A. Horváth I (yellow card) 21', (goal) 29', 47'; Costișor (yellow card) 71'; Signori 88'	Report	Balaskó 1', (yellow card) 12'; Bajúsz (yellow card) 48'; Dienes (yellow card) 58'; Szekeres (yellow card) 81'	Stadium: Káposztás utcai Stadion; Attendance: 3,500; Referee: József Erdős; Assistant referees: G. Erős, Kispál

19 November 2005 12	Pécs	0–0	Ferencváros	Pécs
18:00 CET (UTC+1)	Balaskó (yellow card) 52'; Bajúsz (yellow card) 89'	Report	Zo. Balog (yellow card) 48'	Stadium: Stadion PMFC; Attendance: 4,000; Referee: Sándor Gergely; Assistant referees: I. Mészáros, L. Varga II

26 November 2005 13	Honvéd	1–1	Pécs	Budapest
17:00 CET (UTC+1)	Dobos 84'	Report	Pavičević 60'	Stadium: Bozsik József Stadion; Attendance: 1,500; Referee: Tamás Arany; Assistant referees: P. Hegyi, I. Albert

3 December 2005 14	Pécs	5–0	Pápa	Pécs
15:00 CET (UTC+1)	Kalina 4', 86', 88', 90'; Berdó 29', (yellow card) 30'; N. Sipos (yellow card) 60'	Report	Lipták (yellow card) 20'; A. Farkas (red card) 60'; Geri (yellow card) 73' (yellow-red card) 87'	Stadium: Stadion PMFC; Attendance: 500; Referee: Zoltán Szarka; Assistant referees: Hegyi, L. Varga II

10 December 2005 15	Zalaegerszeg	1–4	Pécs	Zalaegerszeg
15:00 CET (UTC+1)	Sabo 48'; Csóka (yellow card) 66'	Report	Szabados 36'; Balaskó 58'; Szekeres 68'; Kalina 81'	Stadium: ZTE Arena; Attendance: 2,500; Referee: Szabolcs Saskőy; Assistant referees: Székely, Heibl

25 February 2006 16	Kaposvár	2–2	Pécs	Kaposvár
16:00 CET (UTC+1)	Andruskó (yellow card) 13'; Vasiljević 48'; Kovácsevics (yellow card) 50' (yellow-red card) 53'; Zsolnai 61'; Mező (yellow card) 77'	Report	Pavičević (yellow card) 13' (yellow-red card) 45'; Kulcsár (yellow card) 52'; Zahorecz 83' (o.g.); Balaskó 87'	Stadium: Rákóczi Stadion; Attendance: 1,500; Referee: János Makai; Assistant referees: I. Mészáros, L. Varga II

4 March 2006 17	Pécs	2–2	MTK	Pécs
16:00 CET (UTC+1)	Szekeres 20'; Szabados (yellow card) 30'; Balaskó 70' (pen.), (yellow card) 72'	Report	Bonifert 7'; B. Balogh 36'; Hrepka (yellow card) 86'	Stadium: Stadion PMFC; Attendance: 2,000; Referee: Sándor Gergely; Assistant referees: L. Varga II, G. Takács

11 March 2006 18	Győr	1–1	Pécs	Győr
16:00 CET (UTC+1)	Priskin 43', (yellow card) 55'	Report	Kulcsár (yellow card) 34'; Jevdjovic 67'; Sólyom (yellow card) 80'	Stadium: Stadion ETO; Attendance: 1,500; Referee: Viktor Kassai; Assistant referees: G. Erős, R. Kispál

18 March 2006 19	Pécs	2–0	Újpest	Pécs
15:00 CET (UTC+1)	Kulcsár 17', (yellow card) 59'; Pavičević (yellow card) 77'; N. Sipos 88'	Report	B. Tóth (yellow card) 46'; Böjte (yellow card) 71'	Stadium: Stadion PMFC; Attendance: 3,500; Referee: Ferenc Bede; Assistant referees: Tompos, Szalai

25 March 2006 20	Diósgyőr	0–0	Pécs	Miskolc
17:00 CET (UTC+1)	Sipeki (yellow card) 78'	Report	Lantos (yellow card) 90'	Stadium: Diósgyőri Stadion; Attendance: 3,000; Referee: Csaba Imre Sápi; Assistant referees: Z. Tompos, L. Tóth L.

1 April 2006 21	Pécs	0–0	Vasas	Pécs
17:00 CEST (UTC+2)	Schindler (yellow card) 7'; Győri (yellow card) 13'; Kalina (yellow card) 17'; Pavičević (yellow card) 52'; Kulcsár (yellow card) 81'	Report	Fehér (yellow card) 17' (yellow-red card) 69'	Stadium: Stadion PMFC; Attendance: 2,000; Referee: Zsolt Szabó; Assistant referees: Kispál, Hegyi

8 April 206 22	Rákospalota	1–1	Pécs	Budapest
16:30 CEST (UTC+2)	Gá. Horváth I (yellow card) 74'; Nyerges 90+3'	Report	Dienes (yellow card) 24'; Győri (yellow card) 39'; Schindler 45', (yellow card) 78'; Lantos (yellow card) 80'	Stadium: Budai II. László Stadion; Attendance: 1,000; Referee: Szabolcs Saskőy; Assistant referees: Tompos, Heibl

15 April 2006 23	Fehérvár	1–0	Pécs	Székesfehérvár
18:00 CEST (UTC+2)	Dvéri 43'; Schwarcz (yellow card) 45' (yellow-red card) 62'	Report	Bajúsz (yellow card) 26'; Berdó (yellow card) 30'; Kulcsár (yellow card) 58'	Stadium: Sóstói Stadion; Attendance: 3,500; Referee: István Vad; Assistant referees: G. Erős, G. Takács

22 April 2006 24	Pécs	0–2	Debrecen	Pécs
18:00 CEST (UTC+2)	Sólyom (yellow card) 15'; Szabados (yellow card) 17'; Tarcsa (yellow card) 79'	Report	Sidibe 15' (pen.), 72'; Komlósi (yellow card) 49'	Stadium: Stadion PMFC; Attendance: 3,500; Referee: Sándor Gergely; Assistant referees: Z. Kovács, N. Ferencz

29 April 2006 25	Tatabánya	2–0	Pécs	Tatabánya
17:00 CEST (UTC+2)	Filó (yellow card) 34'; Márkus 48', 70'	Report	Szekeres (yellow card) 68'	Stadium: Városi Stadion; Attendance: 2,200; Referee: Szabolcs Szilasi; Assistant referees: T. Vígh, Világi

6 May 2006 26	Pécs	2–1	Sopron	Pécs
19:00 CEST (UTC+2)	Vujic 48'; Bajúsz 52'	Report	Ivancsics (yellow card) 21'; A. Horváth I (yellow card) 56'; Ibric 74'	Stadium: Stadion PMFC; Attendance: 2,000; Referee: Szabolcs Saskőy; Assistant referees: Székely, Heibl

12 May 2006 27	Ferencváros	3–1	Pécs	Budapest
19:00 CEST (UTC+2)	Jovánczai 13', 29'; Lipcsei 15'; Tőzsér (yellow card) 34'	Report	Pavičević (yellow card) 38'; Kulcsár 71'; Schindler (yellow card) 86'	Stadium: Üllői úti Stadion; Attendance: 4,065; Referee: Viktor Kassai; Assistant referees: Ortó, Szpisják

20 May 2006 28	Pécs	1–0	Honvéd	Pécs
18:00 CEST (UTC+2)	Kulcsár 9'; Győri (yellow card) 28'; Berdó (yellow card) 65'	Report	Z. Kovács II (yellow card) 17'	Stadium: Stadion PMFC; Attendance: 1,200; Referee: Károly Török; Assistant referees: Szalay, Z. Márton

27 May 2006 29	Pápa	3–1	Pécs	Pápa
19:00 CEST (UTC+2)	Élder (yellow card) 12'; Fabinho (yellow card) 34'; Lipták 63', 88'; A. Farkas (yellow card) 79'; Kincses (yellow card) 90'; Honma 90+1'	Report	Lantos (yellow card) 55'; N. Sipos (yellow card) 69'; Jevdjovic 73'; Szekeres (yellow card) 76'	Stadium: Perutz Stadion; Attendance: 2,000; Referee: István Mészáros; Assistant referees: G. Kovács, Deutsch

3 June 2006 30	Pécs	0–0	Zalaegerszeg	Pécs
18:00 CEST (UTC+2)	Luczek (yellow card) 40'; Balaskó (yellow card) 45'; J. Sipos (yellow card) 75'; Bajúsz (yellow card) 82'	Report	Lendvai (red card) 54'; Józsi (yellow card) 62'	Stadium: Stadion PMFC; Attendance: 600; Referee: Szabolcs Szilasi; Assistant referees: P. Hegyi, O. Lémon

=== Magyar Kupa ===
11 September 2005 Second round	Enying	2–5	Pécs	Enying
16:00 CEST (UTC+2)	Paluska (yellow card); Vas; Bóka	Report	Tarcsa (yellow card); Bajúsz (yellow card); Kulcsár 3x; Balaskó 2x	Stadium: Enyingi Sportpálya; Attendance: 800; Referee: Péter Solymosi; Assistant referees: G. Takács, Wenczel

21 September 2005 Third round	Haladás	2–2 (a.e.t.) (2–4 p)	Pécs	Szombathely
16:45 CEST (UTC+2)	Mihalecz 61' (pen.); G. Nagy (yellow card) 74'; Imre 91'	Report	Pavičević (yellow card) 6'; Kulcsár 31'; J. Sipos (yellow card) 55'; Dienes (red card) 72'; Gy. Horváth 94'; Schindler (yellow card) 103'	Stadium: Rohonci út Attendance: 600; Referee: Péter Solymosi; Assistant referees: Lémon, S. Nagy
	Penalties
	Baráth (penalty scored); Babati (penalty scored); Balassa (penalty missed); G. Nagy (penalty missed)		(penalty missed) Gy. Horváth; (penalty scored) N. Sipos; (penalty scored) Andorka; (penalty scored) Szögedi; (penalty scored) Bajúsz
Note: Pécs won 4–2 on penalties.

==== Round of 16 ====
26 October 2005 First leg	Szentlőrinc	0–2	Pécs	Szentlőrinc
14:00 CEST (UTC+2)		Report	N. Sipos (yellow card); Pavičević (yellow card); Gy. Horváth 55'; Andorka 85'	Stadium: Szentlőrinci Sportpálya; Attendance: 1,000; Referee: János Makai; Assistant referees: Száraz, Z. Kis

9 November 2005 Second leg	Pécs	0–1 (2–1 agg.)	Szentlőrinc	Pécs
18:00 CET (UTC+1)	Pavičević (yellow card); Balaskó (yellow card); Szabados (yellow card); Berdó (yellow card); Szekeres (yellow card)	Report	Papes (yellow card); Laki 73' (pen.)	Stadium: Stadion PMFC; Attendance: 500; Referee: István Vad; Assistant referees: B. Gaál, Vámos
Note: Pécs won 2–1 on aggregate.

==== Quarter-finals ====
15 March 2006 First leg	Pécs	0–1	Vasas	Pécs
15:00 CET (UTC+1)	Lantos (yellow card) 8'; Kulcsár (yellow card) 37'	Report	A. Tóth (yellow card) 47'; H. Rósa 79'; Lázok (yellow card) 90'	Stadium: Stadion PMFC; Attendance: 1,200; Referee: Péter Solymosi; Assistant referees: T. Takács, S. Szilasi

22 March 2006 Second leg	Vasas	1–0 (2–0 agg.)	Pécs	Budapest
17:00 CET (UTC+1)	Gyánó 30'; Z. Pintér (yellow card) 80'	Report	Kulcsár (yellow card) 65'; Balaskó (yellow card) 66'	Stadium: Illovszky Rudolf Stadion; Attendance: 1,200; Referee: István Vad; Assistant referees: Szpisják, Albert
Note: Vasas won 2–0 on aggregate.
