= 2006–07 Pécsi MFC season =

Pécs
2006–07 season
- Manager: Ferenc Keszei (until 22 May 2007); Gábor Schneider (caretaker, from 22 May 2007)
- Stadium: Stadion PMFC
- Nemzeti Bajnokság I: 15th (relegated)
- Magyar Kupa: Round of 32
- Top goalscorer: League: Árpád Kulcsár (8); All: Árpád Kulcsár (8)
- Highest home attendance: 3,000 v Újpest (31 March 2007, Nemzeti Bajnokság I)
- Lowest home attendance: 800 v Diósgyőr (10 March 2007, Nemzeti Bajnokság I)
- Average home league attendance: 1,400
- Biggest win: 3–1 v Diósgyőr (Away, 8 September 2006, Nemzeti Bajnokság I); 2–0 v Felcsút (Away, 20 September 2006, Magyar Kupa); 2–0 v Fehérvár (Home, 24 February 2007, Nemzeti Bajnokság I)
- Biggest defeat: 0–4 v Ferencváros (Away, 25 October 2006, Magyar Kupa); 0–4 v Tatabánya (Away, 10 December 2006, Nemzeti Bajnokság I)

The 2006–07 season was Pécsi Mecsek Football Club's 28th competitive season, 4th consecutive season in the Nemzeti Bajnokság I and 35th season in existence as a football club. In addition to the domestic league, Pécs participated in that season's editions of the Magyar Kupa.

== Squad ==
Squad at end of season

Note: Flags indicate national team as defined under FIFA eligibility rules; some limited exceptions apply. Players may hold more than one non-FIFA nationality.

| No. | Pos. | Nation | Player |
|---|---|---|---|
| 1 | GK | HUN | Roland Herbert |
| 3 | MF | HUN | János Sipos |
| 6 | DF | ROU | László Tamás |
| 9 | FW | HUN | Zoltán Laki |
| 10 | MF | HUN | Dávid Luczek |
| 11 | MF | HUN | Árpád Kulcsár |
| 13 | FW | HUN | Péter Horváth |
| 14 | DF | HUN | József Szabados |
| 15 | MF | HUN | Zoltán Tóth |
| 16 | GK | HUN | Csaba Sólyom |
| 18 | MF | HUN | Levente Lantos |
| 19 | DF | SRB | Endre Bajúsz |
| 20 | DF | HUN | Zsolt Szekeres |
| 21 | MF | SRB | Čedomir Pavičević |

| No. | Pos. | Nation | Player |
|---|---|---|---|
| 22 | FW | HUN | Zoltán Varga I |
| 24 | DF | HUN | János Győri |
| 25 | FW | HUN | Zsolt Horváth |
| 26 | FW | HUN | Dávid Wittrédi |
| 27 | FW | HUN | Barnabás Sztipánovics |
| 28 | DF | HUN | Zoltán Finta |
| 29 | MF | HUN | Zsolt Kalmár |
| 30 | DF | HUN | Roland Racskó |
| 32 | MF | HUN | Lóránd Szatmári |
| 33 | FW | HUN | Árpád Nógrádi |
| 74 | DF | HUN | András Dienes |
| 77 | MF | HUN | Krisztián Pest |
| 80 | MF | HUN | Tihamér Lukács |

== Competitions ==
=== Overview ===
| Competition | First match | Last match | Starting round | Final position | Record | | | | | | | |
| Competition | First match | Last match | Starting round | Final position | Pld | W | D | L | GF | GA | GD | Win % |
|---|---|---|---|---|---|---|---|---|---|---|---|---|
| Nemzeti Bajnokság I | 29 July 2006 | 26 May 2007 | Matchday 1 | 15th | 30 | 7 | 12 | 11 | 31 | 41 | −10 | 23.33 |
| Magyar Kupa | 20 September 2006 | 25 October 2006 | Third round | Round of 32 | 2 | 1 | 0 | 1 | 2 | 4 | −2 | 50.00 |
| Total | | | | | 32 | 8 | 12 | 12 | 33 | 45 | −12 | 25.00 |

Source: Competitions

=== Nemzeti Bajnokság I ===
==== League table ====
| Pos | Team | Pld | W | D | L | GF | GA | GD | Pts | Qualification or relegation |
|---|---|---|---|---|---|---|---|---|---|---|
| 12 | Tatabánya | 30 | 11 | 3 | 16 | 46 | 58 | −12 | 36 | |
| 13 | Győr | 30 | 9 | 8 | 13 | 37 | 43 | −6 | 35 | |
| 14 | Rákospalota | 30 | 9 | 7 | 14 | 42 | 55 | −13 | 34 | |
| 15 | Pécs (R) | 30 | 7 | 12 | 11 | 31 | 41 | −10 | 33 | Relegation to Nemzeti Bajnokság II |
| 16 | Dunakanyar-Vác (R) | 30 | 4 | 7 | 19 | 21 | 57 | −36 | 19 | Relegation to Nemzeti Bajnokság II |

Source: soccerway.com
(R) Relegated

==== Results summary ====
| Overall | | | | | | | | Home | | | | | | Away | | | | | |
| Pld | W | D | L | GF | GA | GD | Pts | W | D | L | GF | GA | GD | W | D | L | GF | GA | GD |
|---|---|---|---|---|---|---|---|---|---|---|---|---|---|---|---|---|---|---|---|
| 30 | 7 | 12 | 11 | 31 | 41 | −10 | 33 | 3 | 7 | 5 | 15 | 18 | −3 | 4 | 5 | 6 | 16 | 23 | −7 |

Source: Hungarian Football Federation

==== Results by round ====
| Round | 1 | 2 | 3 | 4 | 5 | 6 | 7 | 8 | 9 | 10 | 11 | 12 | 13 | 14 | 15 | 16 | 17 | 18 | 19 | 20 | 21 | 22 | 23 | 24 | 25 | 26 | 27 | 28 | 29 | 30 |
|---|---|---|---|---|---|---|---|---|---|---|---|---|---|---|---|---|---|---|---|---|---|---|---|---|---|---|---|---|---|---|
| Ground | A | H | A | H | A | H | A | H | A | H | A | A | H | A | H | H | A | H | A | H | A | H | A | H | A | H | H | A | H | A |
| Result | L | D | D | L | W | D | L | D | L | D | W | W | W | W | D | L | L | W | D | W | D | L | L | D | L | D | L | D | L | D |
| Position | 10 | 11 | 12 | 14 | 11 | 13 | 13 | 14 | 14 | 14 | 13 | 12 | 9 | 7 | 8 | 9 | 9 | 8 | 8 | 8 | 8 | 8 | 10 | 11 | 13 | 12 | 14 | 15 | 15 | 15 |
| Points | 0 | 1 | 2 | 2 | 5 | 6 | 6 | 7 | 7 | 8 | 11 | 14 | 17 | 20 | 21 | 21 | 21 | 24 | 25 | 28 | 29 | 29 | 29 | 30 | 30 | 31 | 31 | 32 | 32 | 33 |

Source: Matches
A = Away; H = Home; W = Win; D = Draw; L = Loss

==== Matches ====
| 29 July 2006 1 | Debrecen | 2–1 | Pécs | Debrecen |
| 20:00 CEST (UTC+2) | Sidibe 9'; Z. Balogh (yellow card) 32'; Z. Kiss 47'; Szatmári (yellow card) 63' | Report | Pest 40'; Lantos (yellow card) 68' | Stadium: Oláh Gábor utcai Stadion; Attendance: 5,000; Referee: Károly Török; Assistant referees: Attila Kelemen, Zsolt Márton; Fourth official: Miklós Demeter |

| 5 August 2006 2 | Pécs | 3–3 | Tatabánya | Pécs |
| 20:00 CEST (UTC+2) | Nógrádi 23'; Lukács 27'; Pest (yellow card) 35'; Dienes (yellow card) 45'; Lantos (yellow card) 78'; P. Horváth 84' | Report | Filó (yellow card) 16'; Kouemaha 56', 90+1', (yellow card) 90+2'; Márkus 68'; T. Nagy (yellow card) 87'; Bakrač (yellow card) 90' | Stadium: Stadion PMFC; Attendance: 1,300; Referee: Szabolcs Szilasi; Assistant referees: Zsolt Szalai, Oszkár Lémon; Fourth official: Norbert Kiss |

| 19 August 2006 3 | Fehérvár | 2–2 | Pécs | Székesfehérvár |
| 19:00 CEST (UTC+2) | Farkas 47'; Sitku 82' | Report | Pest 15'; Szekeres (yellow card) 37'; Nógrádi 45'; Pavičević (yellow card) 57'; Herbert (yellow card) 80' | Stadium: Sóstói Stadion; Attendance: 2,500; Referee: Sándor Gergely; Assistant referees: Zsolt Szalai, Szabolcs Deutsch; Fourth official: Attila Lidi |

| 26 August 2006 4 | Pécs | 0–1 | MTK | Pécs |
| 17:00 CEST (UTC+2) | Balaskó (yellow card) 29' | Report | Czvitkovics 58'; Zsidai (yellow card) 83' | Stadium: Stadion PMFC; Attendance: 2,000; Referee: Tamás Bognár; Assistant referees: Dr. Péter Szabó, Zoltán Kovács; Fourth official: Norbert Ferencz |

| 8 September 2006 5 | Diósgyőr | 1–3 | Pécs | Miskolc |
| 19:00 CEST (UTC+2) | Simon 90+1' | Report | Kulcsár 1'; Pest 3'; Dienes (yellow card) 17'; Pavičević (yellow card) 29'; Finta (yellow card) 56'; Balaskó 78' | Stadium: Diósgyőri Stadion; Attendance: 2,500; Referee: István Mészáros; Assistant referees: Ferenc Székely, László Viszokai; Fourth official: János Takács |

| 16 September 2006 6 | Pécs | 0–0 | Győr | Pécs |
| 19:00 CEST (UTC+2) | Sipos (yellow card) 39'; Kulcsár (yellow card) 56' | Report | Granát (yellow card) 5'; Mátyus (yellow card) 56' | Stadium: Stadion PMFC; Attendance: 1,500; Referee: Tamás Arany; Assistant referees: Zsolt Szpisják, János Medovarszki; Fourth official: J. Zoltán Kovács |

| 24 September 2006 7 | Újpest | 1–0 | Pécs | Budapest (Note: The match was played at the Budai II. László Stadion in Budapest, instead of Újpest regular stadium, the Szusza Ferenc Stadion in Budapest, as the disciplinary committee of the HFF closed the venue due to the disorderly conduct in the May match against MTK.) |
| 16:00 CEST (UTC+2) | Tisza (yellow card) 31'; Nagy 80'; Hullám (yellow card) 83' | Report | Szekeres (yellow card) 30'; Pest (yellow card) 65' | Stadium: Budai II. László Stadion; Attendance: 4,000; Referee: Viktor Kassai; Assistant referees: Gábor Erős, Tibor Vámos; Fourth official: Gergely Sulyok |

| 30 September 2006 8 | Pécs | 2–2 | Rákospalota | Pécs |
| 16:00 CEST (UTC+2) | Bajúsz (yellow card) 9'; Pavičević (yellow card) 40'; Laki 79'; Sipos 88' | Report | Kapcsos 12'; B. Farkas I (yellow card) 70'; Pusztai 86'; G. Horváth (yellow card) 90+1' | Stadium: Stadion PMFC; Attendance: 1,000; Referee: József Berger; Assistant referees: Zoltán Tompos, Attila Forgács; Fourth official: Miklós Demeter |

| 14 October 2006 9 | Zalaegerszeg | 4–1 | Pécs | Zalaegerszeg |
| 18:00 CEST (UTC+2) | J. Sebők 32', 84'; Ferenczi 55'; Simonfalvi 90+1' | Report | Kulcsár 58'; Nógrádi (yellow card) 65'; Szekeres (yellow card) 65'; Finta (yellow card) 73'; Pest 0 | Stadium: ZTE Arena; Attendance: 6,000; Referee: Szabolcs Szilasi; Assistant referees: Zoltán Kovács, Oszkár Lémon; Fourth official: Norbert Ferencz |

| 21 October 2006 10 | Pécs | 0–0 | Sopron | Pécs |
| 15:00 CEST (UTC+2) | Balaskó (yellow card) 37'; Pavičević (yellow card) 52' | Report | Demjén (yellow card) 37'; Sifter (yellow card) 43' | Stadium: Stadion PMFC; Attendance: 1,000; Referee: Károly Török; Assistant referees: Ferenc Székely, Zsolt Márton; Fourth official: Gábor Péter Kovács |

| 28 October 2006 11 | Honvéd | 0–1 | Pécs | Budapest (Note: The match was played at the Béke téri Stadion in Budapest, instead of Honvéd regular stadium, the Bozsik József Stadion in Budapest, due to the renovation work.) |
| 18:00 CEST (UTC+2) | | Report | Finta (yellow card) 17', (goal) 74' | Stadium: Béke téri Stadion; Attendance: 800; Referee: István Mészáros; Assistant referees: László Viszokai, Dr. Ádám Vári; Fourth official: Bence Gaál |

| 4 November 2006 12 | Paks | 0–1 | Pécs | Paks |
| 13:30 CET (UTC+1) | Kiss (yellow card) 80' | Report | Lantos 14'; Pest (yellow card) 58' | Stadium: Fehérvári úti Stadion; Attendance: 1,000; Referee: Csaba Imre Sápi; Assistant referees: Jozsef Heibl, Attila Forgács; Fourth official: Gábor Péter Kovács |

| 11 November 2006 13 | Pécs | 2–1 | Vasas | Pécs |
| 17:00 CET (UTC+1) | Kulcsár 24', 72'; Lantos (yellow card) 33'; Győri (yellow card) 78' | Report | Ködöböcz (yellow card) 24'; Kovács (yellow card) 51'; N. Németh (yellow card) 84', (goal) 90+2' | Stadium: Stadion PMFC; Attendance: 1,000; Referee: Ferenc Bede; Assistant referees: László Viszokai, György Ring; Fourth official: Miklós Demeter |

| 18 November 2006 14 | Kaposvár | 1–2 | Pécs | Kaposvár |
| 16:00 CET (UTC+1) | Z. Varga II (yellow card) 17'; Zahorecz (yellow card) 29'; Radics (yellow card) 37'; Venczel 76'; Petrók (red card) 90+1' | Report | Balaskó (yellow card) 23'; Pavičević (yellow card) 28'; Kulcsár 56', 58', (yellow card) 90+2'; Dienes (yellow card) 90+3' | Stadium: Rákóczi Stadion; Attendance: 3,000; Referee: Viktor Kassai; Assistant referees: Gábor Erős, Tibor Vámos; Fourth official: Péter Herbály |

| 25 November 2006 15 | Pécs | 1–1 | Dunakanyar-Vác | Pécs |
| 16:00 CET (UTC+1) | Győri (yellow card) 54'; Pest (yellow card) 66'; Szabados 85' | Report | Vén 50'; Laskai (yellow card) 64'; Farkas (yellow card) 82' | Stadium: Stadion PMFC; Attendance: 1,500; Referee: Tamás Arany; Assistant referees: Zoltán Kis, Zsolt Márton; Fourth official: Péter Herbály |

| 2 December 2006 16 | Pécs | 0–2 | Debrecen | Pécs |
| 15:00 CET (UTC+1) | Pavičević (yellow card) 31'; Kulcsár (yellow card) 42'; Bajúsz (yellow card) 90' | Report | Leandro 21'; T. Sándor (yellow card) 71'; B. Virág (yellow card) 76'; Sidibe 90+2' | Stadium: Stadion PMFC; Attendance: 1,300; Referee: Zoltán Iványi; Assistant referees: János Medovarszki, Jozsef Heibl; Fourth official: Zsolt Kovács |

| 10 December 2006 17 | Tatabánya | 4–0 | Pécs | Tatabánya |
| 13:30 CET (UTC+1) | Ndjodo 34'; Kerényi (yellow card) 41'; Kouemaha 45'; Hajdú 71'; Vámosi 88' | Report | Lantos (red card) 62'; Sipos (yellow card) 80' | Stadium: Városi Stadion; Attendance: 1,500; Referee: Csaba Imre Sápi; Assistant referees: Imre Attila Nagy, Zoltán Szalai; Fourth official: Péter Berettyán |

| 24 February 2007 18 | Pécs | 2–0 | Fehérvár | Pécs |
| 15:00 CET (UTC+1) | Lukács 8'; Pavičević (yellow card) 34'; Z. Varga II (yellow card) 56'; Kulcsár 62' | Report | Dvéri (yellow card) 42'; Terjék (yellow card) 61'; Farkas (yellow card) 89' | Stadium: Stadion PMFC; Attendance: 1,500; Referee: Tamás Bognár; Assistant referees: Balázs Huszár, Dr. Péter Szabó; Fourth official: Krisztián Király |

| 2 March 2007 19 | MTK | 0–0 | Pécs | Budapest |
| 19:00 CET (UTC+1) | Zsidai (yellow card) 65' | Report | Szatmári (yellow card) 4'; Lantos (yellow card) 85'; Pavičević (yellow card) 90' | Stadium: Hidegkuti Nándor Stadion; Attendance: 2,000; Referee: Péter Solymosi; Assistant referees: Dr. Péter Kovács, Gábor Takács; Fourth official: Péter Herbály |

| 10 March 2007 20 | Pécs | 1–0 | Diósgyőr | Pécs |
| 16:00 CET (UTC+1) | Sztipánovics 34'; Kulcsár (yellow card) 61'; Lantos (yellow card) 81' | Report | Kéthévoama (yellow card) 24'; Binder (yellow card) 85'; Halgas (yellow card) 90+3' | Stadium: Stadion PMFC; Attendance: 800; Referee: István Mészáros; Assistant referees: László Viszokai, Vencel Tóth II; Fourth official: Norbert Ferencz |

| 18 March 2007 21 | Győr | 0–0 | Pécs | Győr (Note: The match was played at the Ménfői úti Stadion in Gyirmót, a district of Győr, instead of their regular stadium, the Stadion ETO in Győr, which was demolished to make way for the newly built ETO Park.) |
| 15:00 CET (UTC+1) | Kovács (yellow card) 19'; Kiss (yellow card) 36'; Nyári (yellow card) 90' | Report | | Stadium: Ménfői úti Stadion; Attendance: 2,200; Referee: Ferenc Bede; Assistant referees: Zoltán Szalai, Zoltán Kovács; Fourth official: J. Zoltán Kovács |

| 31 March 2007 22 | Pécs | 0–1 | Újpest | Pécs |
| 15:00 CEST (UTC+2) | Lantos (yellow card) 60' | Report | Kisznyér (yellow card) 18'; Vaskó (yellow card) 52', (goal) 71' | Stadium: Stadion PMFC; Attendance: 3,000; Referee: Tamás Arany; Assistant referees: Gábor Takács, Oszkár Lémon; Fourth official: Gábor Péter Kovács |

| 7 April 2007 23 | Rákospalota | 1–0 | Pécs | Budapest |
| 16:30 CEST (UTC+2) | Polonkai 33', (yellow card) 74'; Sallai (yellow card) 78' | Report | Kulcsár (yellow card) 90+2' | Stadium: Budai II. László Stadion; Attendance: 1,000; Referee: Zsolt Szabó; Assistant referees: Róbert Kispál, Dr. Péter Hegyi |

| 14 April 2007 24 | Pécs | 1–1 | Zalaegerszeg | Pécs |
| 17:00 CEST (UTC+2) | Pest (yellow card) 65'; Nógrádi 79'; Z. Varga II (yellow card) 90' | Report | Waltner 4' | Stadium: Stadion PMFC; Attendance: 1,300; Referee: Csaba Imre Sápi; Assistant referees: Tibor Vígh, László Viszokai; Fourth official: Norbert Ferencz |

| 21 April 2007 25 | Sopron | 3–1 | Pécs | Sopron |
| 18:00 CEST (UTC+2) | Radu 8'; Munteanu (yellow card) 33'; Rus 38', (yellow card) 62'; Magasföldi (yellow card) 79', (goal) 89' | Report | Z. Varga II (yellow card) 47'; Szabados (yellow card) 54'; Sipos 65' | Stadium: Káposztás utcai Stadion; Attendance: 2,000; Referee: Péter Solmyosi; Assistant referees: Oszkár Lémon, Gábor Takács; Fourth official: Krisztián Marton |

| 28 April 2007 26 | Pécs | 1–1 | Honvéd | Pécs |
| 17:00 CEST (UTC+2) | Lukács 47', (yellow card) 47'; Dienes (yellow card) 61' | Report | Vincze (yellow card) 22'; Pomper (yellow card) 59', (goal) 89' | Stadium: Stadion PMFC; Attendance: 1,200; Referee: Tamás Bognár; Assistant referees: Balázs Huszár, Dr. Péter Szabó; Fourth official: Attila Szommer |

| 5 May 2007 27 | Pécs | 0–2 | Paks | Pécs |
| 18:00 CEST (UTC+2) | Sólyom (red card) 1'; Dienes (yellow card) 23'; Pavičević (yellow card) 28' | Report | F. Horváth 28'; Tamási (yellow card) 34'; Fehér (yellow card) 66', (goal) 85'; Molnár (yellow card) 82'; Buzás (yellow card) 88' | Stadium: Stadion PMFC; Attendance: 1,100; Referee: Zsolt Szabó; Assistant referees: Róbert Kispál, Zoltán Kovács; Fourth official: Tibor Farkas |

| 12 May 2007 28 | Vasas | 3–3 | Pécs | Budapest |
| 18:00 CEST (UTC+2) | Kenesei 20'; Pintér (yellow card) 38'; Lázok 63'; Pandur 71'; A. Tóth (yellow card) 72' | Report | Pest 17', 33'; Dienes (yellow card) 24'; Finta (yellow card) 50'; Kulcsár 88' | Stadium: Illovszky Rudolf Stadion; Attendance: 2,500; Referee: Szabolcs Szilasi; Assistant referees: József Heibl, György Ring; Fourth official: Gábor Péter Kovács |

| 19 May 2007 29 | Pécs | 2–3 | Kaposvár | Pécs |
| 19:00 CEST (UTC+2) | Sztipánovics 4'; Pest (yellow card) 36'; Lukács 43'; Szabados (yellow card) 55'; Szekeres (yellow card) 72' | Report | Oláh 48'; Vasiljević 52', 74'; P. Szakály (yellow card) 79'; Maróti (yellow card) 86' | Stadium: Stadion PMFC; Attendance: 1,500; Referee: István Vad; Assistant referees: Tibor Vámos, Zoltán Szalai; Fourth official: Gábor Péter Kovács |

| 26 May 2007 30 | Dunakanyar-Vác | 1–1 | Pécs | Vác |
| 18:00 CEST (UTC+2) | Farkas (yellow card) 26'; Palásthy (yellow card) 67'; Makrai (yellow card) 68'; Bozori 83' | Report | Pavičević (yellow card) 63'; Szabados (yellow card) 68'; P. Horváth 73' | Stadium: Ligeti Stadion; Attendance: 500; Referee: József Berger; Assistant referees: Zoltán Pápai, Dr. Zsolt Varga; Fourth official: Gábor Péter Kovács |

=== Magyar Kupa ===
| 20 September 2006 Third round | Felcsút | 0–2 | Pécs | Felcsút |
| 17:00 CEST (UTC+2) | | Report | Dienes; Szatmári | Stadium: Felcsút Sporttelep; Attendance: 400; Referee: Zoltán Iványi |

| 25 October 2006 Round of 32 | Ferencváros | 4–0 | Pécs | Budapest |
| 18:00 CEST (UTC+2) | Tököli 37'; Szalai 40'; Tímár 77', (yellow card) 78'; Csepregi 87', (yellow card) 90+1' | Report | Z. Horváth (yellow card) 74' | Stadium: Üllői úti Stadion; Attendance: 5,000; Referee: Tamás Arany; Assistant referees: Dr. Péter Kovács, Zoltán Szalai |

== Statistics ==
=== Overall ===
Appearances (Apps) numbers are for appearances in competitive games only, including sub appearances.
Source: Competitions

| No. | Player | Pos. | Nemzeti Bajnokság I | | | | Magyar Kupa | | | | Total | | | |
| No. | Player | Pos. | Apps | Goal | Yellow card | Red card | Apps | Goal | Yellow card | Red card | Apps | Goal | Yellow card | Red card |
|---|---|---|---|---|---|---|---|---|---|---|---|---|---|---|
| 1 | (Hungary) Roland Herbert | GK | 25 | | 1 | | | | | | 25 | | 1 | |
| 1 | (Hungary) Milán Udvarácz | GK | 1 | | | | | | | | 1 | | | |
| 3 | (Hungary) János Sipos | MF | 25 | 2 | 2 | | 1 | | | | 26 | 2 | 2 | |
| 6 | (Romania) László Tamás | DF | | | | | | | | | | | | |
| 7 | (Hungary) Iván Balaskó | MF | 12 | 1 | 3 | | 2 | | | | 14 | 1 | 3 | |
| 9 | (Hungary) Zoltán Laki | FW | 9 | 1 | | | 1 | | | | 10 | 1 | | |
| 10 | (Hungary) Dávid Luczek | MF | | | | | | | | | | | | |
| 11 | (Hungary) Árpád Kulcsár | MF | 28 | 8 | 5 | | 1 | | | | 29 | 8 | 5 | |
| 12 | (Hungary) Gergő Csaba | GK | 1 | | | | | | | | 1 | | | |
| 13 | (Hungary) Péter Horváth | FW | 11 | 2 | | | | | | | 11 | 2 | | |
| 14 | (Hungary) József Szabados | DF | 24 | 1 | 3 | | 1 | | | | 25 | 1 | 3 | |
| 15 | (Hungary) Zoltán Tóth | MF | 11 | | | | 1 | | | | 12 | | | |
| 16 | (Hungary) Csaba Sólyom | GK | 4 | | | 1 | 2 | | | | 6 | | | 1 |
| 17 | (Serbia) Goran Vujic | FW | 1 | | | | | | | | 1 | | | |
| 18 | (Hungary) Levente Lantos | MF | 22 | 1 | 6 | 1 | 1 | | | | 23 | 1 | 6 | 1 |
| 19 | (Serbia) Endre Bajúsz | DF | 16 | | 2 | | 2 | | | | 18 | | 2 | |
| 20 | (Hungary) Zsolt Szekeres | DF | 29 | | 4 | | 2 | | | | 31 | | 4 | |
| 21 | (Serbia) Čedomir Pavičević | MF | 22 | | 10 | | | | | | 22 | | 10 | |
| 22 | (Hungary) Zoltán Varga I | FW | 2 | | | | | | | | 2 | | | |
| 22 | (Hungary) Zoltán Varga II | FW | 11 | | 3 | | | | | | 11 | | 3 | |
| 24 | (Hungary) János Győri | DF | 15 | | 2 | | 2 | | | | 17 | | 2 | |
| 25 | (Hungary) Zsolt Horváth | FW | | | | | 1 | | 1 | | 1 | | 1 | |
| 26 | (Hungary) Norbert Szabó | FW | 1 | | | | 1 | | | | 2 | | | |
| 26 | (Hungary) Dávid Wittrédi | FW | 4 | | | | | | | | 4 | | | |
| 27 | (Hungary) Barnabás Sztipánovics | FW | 9 | 2 | | | | | | | 9 | 2 | | |
| 28 | (Hungary) Zoltán Finta | DF | 15 | 1 | 4 | | 2 | | | | 17 | 1 | 4 | |
| 29 | (Hungary) Zsolt Kalmár | MF | 3 | | | | | | | | 3 | | | |
| 30 | (Hungary) Roland Racskó | DF | | | | | | | | | | | | |
| 32 | (Hungary) Lóránd Szatmári | MF | 21 | | 1 | | 2 | 1 | | | 23 | 1 | 1 | |
| 33 | (Hungary) Árpád Nógrádi | FW | 20 | 3 | 1 | | 1 | | | | 21 | 3 | 1 | |
| 74 | (Hungary) András Dienes | DF | 28 | | 6 | | 2 | 1 | | | 30 | 1 | 6 | |
| 77 | (Hungary) Krisztián Pest | MF | 23 | 5 | 6 | 1 | 2 | | | | 25 | 5 | 6 | 1 |
| 80 | (Hungary) Tihamér Lukács | MF | 26 | 4 | 1 | | 1 | | | | 27 | 4 | 1 | |
| Own goals | | | | | | | | | | | | | | |
| Totals | | | | 31 | 60 | 3 | | 2 | 1 | | | 33 | 61 | 3 |

=== Clean sheets ===
| | | | Clean sheets | | |
| No. | Player | Games Played | Nemzeti Bajnokság I | Magyar Kupa | Total |
|---|---|---|---|---|---|
| 1 | (Hungary) Roland Herbert | 25 | 8 | | 8 |
| 16 | (Hungary) Csaba Sólyom | 6 | | 1 | 1 |
| 1 | (Hungary) Milán Udvarácz | 1 | | | |
| 12 | (Hungary) Gergő Csaba | 1 | | | |
| Totals | | | 8 | 1 | 9 |
