= 2006–07 Zalaegerszegi TE season =

Zalaegerszeg
2006–07 season
- Manager: Antal Simon (until April); Tamás Nagy (from April)
- Stadium: ZTE Arena
- Nemzeti Bajnokság I: 3rd
- Magyar Kupa: Quarter-finals
Home colours	Away colours

The 2006–07 season was Zalaegerszegi Torna Egylet Football Club's 69th competitive season, 15th consecutive season in the Nemzeti Bajnokság I and 86th year in existence as a football club. In addition to the domestic league, Zalaegerszeg participated in that season's editions of the Magyar Kupa.

== Squad ==
As of 21 February 2007

Note: Flags indicate national team as defined under FIFA eligibility rules; some limited exceptions apply. Players may hold more than one non-FIFA nationality.

No.	Pos.	Nation	Player
1	GK	HUN	Zoltán Varga
2	DF	HUN	Gergely Kocsárdi
3	DF	HUN	Tamás Kádár
3	MF	HUN	István Rácz
4	MF	SVK	Juraj Dovičovič
6	DF	ROU	Sorin Botiș
7	MF	HUN	Balázs Molnár
8	MF	HUN	Lajos Nagy
9	FW	HUN	Róbert Waltner
11	MF	SRB	Ivica Francišković
14	DF	ROU	Ciprian Dianu

No.	Pos.	Nation	Player
15	FW	DEN	Rajko Lekić
16	FW	CRO	Besnik Ramadani
17	DF	HUN	Zsolt Csóka
19	MF	HUN	Béla Koplárovics
20	GK	SVK	Martin Lipčák
22	MF	SRB	Darko Ljubojević
23	MF	HUN	György Józsi
24	MF	HUN	Péter Máté
30	MF	HUN	Zoltán Tóth
87	MF	HUN	Gábor Simonfalvi
99	MF	HUN	István Ludánszki

== Competitions ==
=== Overview ===
Competition	First match	Last match	Starting round	Final position	Record							
Competition	First match	Last match	Starting round	Final position	Pld	W	D	L	GF	GA	GD	Win %
Nemzeti Bajnokság I	31 July 2006	26 May 2007	Matchday 1	3rd	30	17	4	9	54	38	+16	56.67
Magyar Kupa	20 September 2006	11 April 2007	Third round	Quarter-finals	6	3	1	2	16	11	+5	50.00
Total					36	20	5	11	70	49	+21	55.56

Source: Competitions

=== Nemzeti Bajnokság I ===
==== League table ====
Pos	Team	Pld	W	D	L	GF	GA	GD	Pts	Qualification or relegation
1	Debrecen (C)	30	22	3	5	63	21	+42	69	Qualification for the Champions League second qualifying round
2	MTK	30	19	4	7	61	33	+28	61	Qualification for the UEFA Cup first qualifying round
3	Zalaegerszeg	30	17	4	9	54	38	+16	55	Qualification for the Intertoto Cup second round
4	Újpest	30	15	4	11	39	32	+7	46 (Note: Újpest were deducted three points due to federation decision.)	
5	Vasas	30	13	6	11	43	41	+2	45	

Source: soccerway.com
(C) Champions

==== Results summary ====
Overall								Home						Away					
Pld	W	D	L	GF	GA	GD	Pts	W	D	L	GF	GA	GD	W	D	L	GF	GA	GD
30	17	4	9	54	38	+16	55	10	3	2	29	14	+15	7	1	7	25	24	+1

Source: Hungarian Football Federation

==== Results by round ====
Round	1	2	3	4	5	6	7	8	9	10	11	12	13	14	15	16	17	18	19	20	21	22	23	24	25	26	27	28	29	30
Ground	A	H	A	H	A	H	A	A	H	A	H	A	H	A	H	H	A	H	A	H	A	H	H	A	H	A	H	A	H	A
Result	W	W	W	D	W	W	W	W	W	L	W	L	D	L	W	W	L	D	L	W	L	W	L	D	W	L	W	W	L	W
Position	5	2	1	1	2	2	1	1	1	2	1	2	2	2	2	2	3	3	3	3	3	3	4	4	3	4	3	3	3	3

Source: Matches
A = Away; H = Home; W = Win; D = Draw; L = Loss

==== Matches ====
31 July 2006 1	Fehérvár	2–3	Zalaegerszeg	Székesfehérvár
	Sitku 45', 73'	Report	Ljubojević 49'; Nagy 54'; Józsi 70'	Stadium: Sóstói Stadion; Referee: Sándor Andó-Szabó

4 August 2006 2	Zalaegerszeg	1–0	MTK	Zalaegerszeg
	Ljubojević	Report		Stadium: ZTE Arena; Referee: Attila Hanacsek

18 August 2006 3	Diósgyőr	1–4	Zalaegerszeg	Miskolc
	Csóka 26' (o.g.)	Report	Ferenczi 2', 81'; Nagy 31', 55'	Stadium: Diósgyőri Stadion; Referee: Csaba Imre Sápi

26 August 2006 4	Zalaegerszeg	2–2	Győr	Zalaegerszeg
	Nagy 44'; Ferenczi 81'	Report	Bajzát 28'; Virág 61'	Stadium: ZTE Arena; Referee: Károly Török

9 September 2006 5	Újpest	0–1	Zalaegerszeg	Budapest
15:00 CEST (UTC+2)		Report	J. Sebők 61'	Stadium: Szusza Ferenc Stadion; Referee: István Vad

16 September 2006 6	Zalaegerszeg	3–0	Rákospalota	Zalaegerszeg
	V. Sebők (yellow card) 10', (goal) 47'; J. Sebők (yellow card) 17'; Máté 29'; Z. Tóth 34'	Report	Torma (yellow card) 18'; Török (yellow card) 24'; Földvári (yellow card) 63'	Stadium: ZTE Arena; Attendance: 7,500; Referee: Zsolt Szabó

25 September 2006 7	Honvéd	1–2	Zalaegerszeg	Budapest
	Koós 10'	Report	Francišković 82'; Waltner 88'	Stadium: Bozsik József Stadion; Referee: Ferenc Bede

2 October 2006 8	Sopron	1–2	Zalaegerszeg	Sopron
	Feczesin 82'	Report	J. Sebők 33'; Botiș 84'	Stadium: Káposztás utcai Stadion; Referee: János Megyebíró

14 October 2006 9	Zalaegerszeg	4–1	Pécs	Zalaegerszeg
	J. Sebők 32', 84'; Ferenczi 55'; Simonfalvi 90+1'	Report	Kulcsár 58'	Stadium: ZTE Arena; Referee: Szabolcs Szilasi

21 October 2006 10	Paks	2–0	Zalaegerszeg	Paks
	Buzás 50'; Kiss 69'	Report		Stadium: Fehérvári úti Stadion; Referee: Zsolt Szabó

30 October 2006 11	Zalaegerszeg	1–0	Vasas	Zalaegerszeg
	Fehér 58' (o.g.)	Report		Stadium: ZTE Arena; Referee: Péter Solymosi

4 November 2006 12	Kaposvár	3–1	Zalaegerszeg	Kaposvár
	Oláh 6', 42'; Alves 70'	Report	Waltner 69'	Stadium: Rákóczi Stadion; Referee: Tamás Arany

11 November 2006 13	Zalaegerszeg	1–1	Vác	Zalaegerszeg
	Waltner 39'	Report	Vén 56'	Stadium: ZTE Arena; Referee: Tamás Bognár

18 November 2006 14	Debrecen	3–1	Zalaegerszeg	Debrecen
	Zsolnai 11', 13'; Sidibe 86'	Report	Józsi 26'	Stadium: Oláh Gábor utcai Stadion; Referee: Sándor Andó-Szabó

25 November 2006 15	Zalaegerszeg	1–0	Tatabánya	Zalaegerszeg
	Francišković 90+9'	Report		Stadium: ZTE Arena; Referee: István Mészáros

1 December 2006 16	Zalaegerszeg	2–1	Fehérvár	Zalaegerszeg
	Nagy 29'; Ferenczi 68'	Report	Sitku 10'	Stadium: ZTE Arena; Referee: Ferenc Bede

8 December 2006 17	MTK	2–0	Zalaegerszeg	Budapest
	Czvitkovics 49'; Pál 88'	Report		Stadium: Hidegkuti Nándor Stadion; Referee: Zsolt Szabó

24 February 2007 18	Zalaegerszeg	2–2	Diósgyőr	Zalaegerszeg
	Máté; Rubint (o.g.)	Report	Halgas; Simon	Stadium: ZTE Arena; Referee: Szabolcs Szilasi

3 March 2007 19	Győr	2–1	Zalaegerszeg	Győr (Note: Győr played at the Ménfői úti Stadion in March until the newly built ETO Park was ready.)
	Brnović 37'; Bajzát 44'	Report	V. Sebők 76'	Stadium: Ménfői úti Stadion; Referee: István Vad

12 March 2007 20	Zalaegerszeg	2–0	Újpest	Zalaegerszeg
	Francišković 48'; Waltner 79'	Report		Stadium: ZTE Arena; Referee: Péter Solymosi

17 March 2007 21	Rákospalota	2–1	Zalaegerszeg	Budapest
	Torma 4', 12'; Illyés (yellow card) 56'; Somorjai (yellow card) 83'; G. Horváth (yellow card) 90+2'	Report	Botiș (yellow card) 46'; Francišković (yellow card) 71'; Waltner 85'; Lekić (yellow card) 90+2'	Stadium: Budai II. László Stadion; Attendance: 500; Referee: Zoltán Iványi

2 April 2007 22	Zalaegerszeg	3–2	Honvéd	Zalaegerszeg
	Waltner 44', 45'; Lekić 75'	Report	Ivancsics 21'; Genito 89'	Stadium: ZTE Arena; Referee: Viktor Kassai

7 April 2007 23	Zalaegerszeg	1–3	Sopron	Zalaegerszeg
	Lekić 37'	Report	Feczesin 17', 31'; Cigan 76'	Stadium: ZTE Arena; Referee: Tamás Arany

14 April 2007 24	Pécs	1–1	Zalaegerszeg	Pécs
	Nógrádi 79'	Report	Waltner 4'	Stadium: Stadion PMFC; Referee: Csaba Imre Sápi

21 April 2007 25	Zalaegerszeg	4–0	Paks	Zalaegerszeg
	Waltner 7'; Salamon 11' (o.g.); Józsi 23'; Dovičovič 73'	Report		Stadium: ZTE Arena; Referee: Szabolcs Szilasi

28 April 2007 26	Vasas	4–0	Zalaegerszeg	Budapest
		Report		Stadium: Illovszky Rudolf Stadion

7 May 2007 27	Zalaegerszeg	2–1	Kaposvár	Zalaegerszeg
		Report		Stadium: ZTE Arena; Referee: Krisztián Pánczél

12 May 2007 28	Vác	0–5	Zalaegerszeg	Vác
		Report	Ludánszki; Máté; Waltner x3	Stadium: Ligeti Stadion; Referee: Tamás Bognár

18 May 2007 29	Zalaegerszeg	0–1	Debrecen	Zalaegerszeg
		Report	Leandro 51'	Stadium: ZTE Arena; Referee: Zsolt Szabó

26 May 2007 30	Tatabánya	0–3	Zalaegerszeg	Tatabánya
		Report	Balázs x2; Kocsárdi	Stadium: Stadion Városi; Referee: Mihály Fábián

=== Magyar Kupa ===
20 September 2006 Third round	Andráshida	2–4	Zalaegerszeg	Zalaegerszeg
		Report		Stadium: Novák Mihály utca

25 October 2006 Fourth round	Hévíz	0–4	Zalaegerszeg	Hévíz
		Report	Ferenczi; Máté; V. Sebők; Waltner	Stadium: Kossuth Lajos utca

==== Round of 16 ====
8 November 2006 First leg	Zalaegerszeg	1–0	Rákospalota	Zalaegerszeg
	Máté (yellow card) 39'; J. Sebők (red card) 41'; Botiș (yellow card) 45'; Ferenczi 55' (pen.); Lendvai (yellow card) 62'	Report	B. Kovács (yellow card) 88'	Stadium: ZTE Arena; Attendance: 1,000; Referee: Ferenc Bede

22 November 2006 Second leg	Rákospalota	4–3 (4–4 (a) agg.)	Zalaegerszeg	Budapest
	Torma 14', (yellow card) 34'; Pusztai 30'; Kapcsos (yellow card) 38'; G. Horváth (yellow card) 53'; Bárányos (yellow card) 45' (yellow-red card) 45'; G. Nagy I 74'; Makra (yellow card) 90+1' (yellow-red card) 90+5'	Report	Waltner 11', 26'; Ferenczi 75'; Kocsárdi (yellow card) 76'; B. Molnár (yellow card) 87'	Stadium: Budai II. László Stadion; Attendance: 400; Referee: Mihály Fábián
Note: 4–4 on aggregate. Zalaegerszeg won on away goals.

==== Quarter-finals ====
21 March 2007 First leg	Diósgyőr	2–1	Zalaegerszeg	Miskolc
	Simon 29', 46'	Report	Waltner 80'	Stadium: Diósgyőri Stadion; Referee: Tamás Arany

11 April 2007 Second leg	Zalaegerszeg	3–3 (4–5 agg.)	Diósgyőr	Zalaegerszeg
	Ljubojević 8'; Lekić 52'; Waltner 62'	Report	Abdou 6', 32'; Simon 17'	Stadium: ZTE Arena; Referee: Tamás Bognár
Note: Diósgyőr won 5–4 on aggregate.
