= Darko Perić =

Darko Perić may refer to:

- Darko Perić (footballer)
- Darko Perić (actor)
