= László Kónya =

Hungarian footballer (born 1979)

Personal information
- Date of birth: 10 February 1979 (age 47)
- Place of birth: Zalaegerszeg, Hungary
- Height: 1.95 m (6 ft 5 in)
- Position: Defender

Senior career*
Years	Team	Apps	(Gls)
1997–1998	Zalaegerszeg	0	(0)
1997–1998	→ Zalaapáti (loan)	26	(2)
1998–1999	SC Sopron	4	(0)
1998–1999	→ Soproni VSE (loan)	9	(2)
1999–2000	Nagykanizsa	21	(0)
2000–2001	Zalaegerszeg	9	(0)
2001–2002	Hévíz	28	(3)
2002	Kaposvár	12	(0)
2002–2003	Hévíz	24	(2)
2003–2004	BKV Előre	7	(0)
2004–2006	Hévíz	32	(4)
2006–2007	Zalaegerszeg	12	(2)
2006–2007	→ Hévíz (loan)	13	(1)
2007–2008	Barcs	32	(1)
2008–2009	Akritas Chlorakas		
2009–2010	Hévíz	5	(0)
2010–2019	Semjénháza	81	(23)
Total		315	(40)
- * Club domestic league appearances and goals

László Kónya (born 10 February 1979) is a Hungarian former professional footballer who played as a defender.

== Career ==
On 24 February 2006, after rejoining Nemzeti Bajnokság I club Zalaegerszeg from Hévíz, Kónya scored in his first league appearance of his new spell, opening the scoring in a 2–0 victory over previously unbeaten Debrecen.

== Career statistics ==
Appearances and goals by club, season and competition
Club	Season	League			Magyar Kupa		Other		Total	
Club	Season	Division	Apps	Goals	Apps	Goals	Apps	Goals	Apps	Goals
Zalaapáti (loan)	1997–98	Nemzeti Bajnokság III	26	2	—		—		26	2
SC Sopron	1998–99	Nemzeti Bajnokság II	4	0	—		—		4	0
Soproni VSE (loan)	1998–99	Nemzeti Bajnokság III	9	2	—		—		9	2
Nagykanizsa	1999–2000	Nemzeti Bajnokság I	21	0	—		—		21	0
Zalaegerszeg	2000–01	Nemzeti Bajnokság I	9	0	2	1	—		11	1
Hévíz	2000–01	Nemzeti Bajnokság II	13	1	—		—		13	1
Hévíz	2001–02	Nemzeti Bajnokság II	15	2	—		—		15	2
Hévíz	Total		28	3	—		—		28	3
Kaposvár	2001–02	Nemzeti Bajnokság II	12	0	—		—		12	0
Hévíz	2002–03	Nemzeti Bajnokság II	24	2	—		—		24	2
BKV Előre	2003–04	Nemzeti Bajnokság II	7	0	2	0	—		9	0
Hévíz	2003–04	Nemzeti Bajnokság II	6	0	—		—		6	0
Hévíz	2004–05	Nemzeti Bajnokság II	12	1	—		1 (Note: Appearance in Nemzeti Bajnokság II relegation play-offs)	0	13	1
Hévíz	2005–06	Nemzeti Bajnokság II	14	3	1	0	—		15	3
Hévíz	Total		32	4	1	0	1	0	34	4
Zalaegerszeg	2005–06	Nemzeti Bajnokság I	12	2	—		—		12	2
Hévíz (loan)	2006–07	Nemzeti Bajnokság II	13	1	2	0	—		15	1
Barcs	2006–07	Nemzeti Bajnokság II	12	0	—		—		12	0
Barcs	2007–08	Nemzeti Bajnokság II	20	1	1	0	—		21	1
Barcs	Total		32	1	1	0	—		33	1
Hévíz	2009–10	Nemzeti Bajnokság II	5	0	1	0	—		6	0
Semjénháza	2009–10	Megyei Bajnokság I	16	6	—		2 (Note: Appearances in Magyar Kupa qualifying rounds)	2	18	8
Semjénháza	2010–11	Megyei Bajnokság I	20	8	—		—		20	8
Semjénháza	2011–12	Megyei Bajnokság I	19	6	—		1 (Note: Appearance in Zala Megyei Kupa)	1	20	7
Semjénháza	2012–13	Megyei Bajnokság I	5	2	—		—		5	2
Semjénháza	2018–19	Megyei Bajnokság I	21	1	—		—		21	1
Semjénháza	Total		81	23	—		3	3	84	26
Career total			315	40	9	1	4	3	328	44

== Honours ==
Semjénháza

- Megyei Bajnokság I – Zala: 2009–10
