= Darko Ljubojević =

Bosnian footballer and administrator (born 1975)

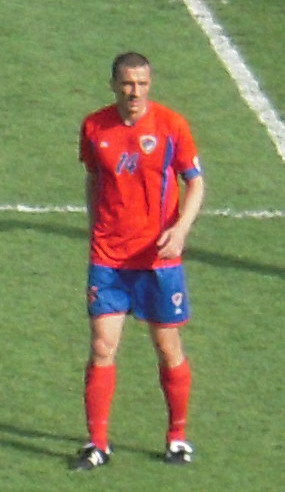
- Ljubojević with Borac Banja Luka in 2009

Vice President of the Football Association of Bosnia and Herzegovina
- In office 18 April 2011 – 31 December 2017
- President: Ivica Osim (2011–2012); Elvedin Begić (2012–2017)

Personal details
- Born: 8 January 1975 (age 51) Banja Luka, SR Bosnia and Herzegovina, SFR Yugoslavia
Association football career
- Position: Midfielder
Senior career*
Years	Team	Apps	(Gls)
1992–1994	Borac Banja Luka		
1995–1997	Red Star Belgrade	25	(4)
1995–1996	→ Budućnost Valjevo (loan)		
1997–1998	Ourense	31	(2)
1998–1999	Red Star Belgrade	6	(3)
1999–2000	Cádiz	0	(0)
2000–2001	Borac Banja Luka		
2001–2005	Zalaegerszeg	77	(9)
2005–2006	Panserraikos	23	(1)
2006–2007	Zalaegerszeg	17	(3)
2007–2008	Laktaši	33	(8)
2009	Borac Banja Luka	18	(5)
2010	Laktaši	10	(1)
International career
1996–1997	FR Yugoslavia U21		
- * Club domestic league appearances and goals

Darko Ljubojević (Serbian Cyrillic: Дарко Љубојевић; born 8 January 1975) is a Bosnian football executive and former player who played as a midfielder. He was vice president of the Football Association of Bosnia and Herzegovina from 2011 to 2017.

== Club career ==
Ljubojević was born in Banja Luka. He formerly played, among others, for Red Star Belgrade in Serbia, CD Ourense and Cádiz CF in Spain, Borac Banja Luka and Laktaši in Bosnia and Herzegovina, Zalaegerszegi TE in Hungary and Panserraikos in Greece.

== International career ==
A Serb from Bosnia and Herzegovina, Ljubojević represented FR Yugoslavia (Serbia and Montenegro) at U-21 level.

== Post-playing career ==
After retiring, Ljubojević became the sporting director of Borac Banja Luka, a post he held until 26 February 2013, when he resigned. In April 2011, he became vice president of the Football Association of Bosnia and Herzegovina. Ljubojević also served as an official within the Bosnian FA.
