= Rolf Landerl =

Austrian footballer and manager

Personal information
- Full name: Rolf Martin Landerl
- Date of birth: 24 October 1975 (age 51)
- Place of birth: Vienna, Austria
- Height: 1.81 m (5 ft 11 in)
- Position: Forward

Team information
- Current team: Austria Klagenfurt (head coach)

Youth career
- 1983–1988: SR Donaufeld
- 1988–1993: Rapid Wien

Senior career*
Years	Team	Apps	(Gls)
1993–1994	Rapid Wien	0	(0)
1994–1997	Inter Bratislava	64	(16)
1997–2000	AZ Alkmaar	29	(2)
2000–2002	Fortuna Sittard	69	(5)
2002–2004	Groningen	47	(1)
2004–2005	Penafiel	17	(0)
2005–2006	FC Sopron	10	(2)
2006	Admira Wacker	13	(2)
2006–2007	Grazer AK	23	(1)
2007–2008	Admira Wacker	21	(2)
2008	Dunajská Streda	4	(1)
2009	ASK Schwadorf	57	(9)
2009–2011	VfB Lübeck		
2011–2013	SV St. Margarethen		

International career
2002	Austria	1	(0)

Managerial career
- 2012–2013: St. Margarethen (player-manager)
- 2013–2016: Admira Wacker Amateure
- 2016–2021: VfB Lübeck
- 2021–2022: SV Horn
- 2022–2023: Admira Wacker
- 2024–2025: Klagenfurt II
- 2025–: Austria Klagenfurt
- * Club domestic league appearances and goals

Rolf Martin Landerl (born 24 October 1975) is an Austrian professional football coach and a former player. He is the current head coach of Austria Klagenfurt.

== Coaching career ==
Landerl worked from 2010 to 2011 as a youth coach for VfB Lübeck while he still played for the club. In 2011, Landerl joined SV St. Margarethen as a player and he was also hired as an individual coach at the academy of his former club, Admira Wacker. In November 2012, he was appointed player-manager for St. Margarethen. He left St. Margarethen in the summer 2013.

On 4 July 2013, Landerl was appointed manager of FC Admira Wacker Mödling Amateure. In January 2016 VfB Lübeck confirmed, that Landerl would return to the club for the 2016–17 season as the club's new manager.

On 4 June 2021, he returned to Austria and was hired by Horn. In November 2022, he was appointed head coach of Admira Wacker.

In June 2024, he took charge of Klagenfurt II. A year later, he was promoted to head coach of the first team of Austria Klagenfurt.

== Personal life ==
Landerl was born in Vienna, Austria, to a Finnish mother and an Austrian father. He has a dual citizenship of Austria and Finland.

== Career statistics ==
Appearances and goals by national team and year
National team	Year	Apps	Goals
Austria	2002	1	0
Austria	Total	1	0
