= Ivan Bojović =

Montenegrin footballer

Personal information
- Full name: Ivan Bojović
- Date of birth: 17 March 1977 (age 49)
- Place of birth: Titograd, SFR Yugoslavia
- Height: 1.85 m (6 ft 1 in)
- Position: Defender

Senior career*
Years	Team	Apps	(Gls)
2001–2005	Čukarički	66	(2)
2005	Zalaegerszeg	9	(0)
2006	Radnički Niš	15	(0)
2006–2007	Voždovac	15	(0)
2007–2008	Čukarički	4	(0)
- * Club domestic league appearances and goals

Ivan Bojović (Cyrillic: Иван Бојовић; born 17 March 1977) is a Montenegrin former football defender.

== Club career ==
He spend most of his career playing with Belgrade's club FK Čukarički but he also played in other Serbian clubs as FK Radnički Niš and FK Voždovac, and also with Hungarian ZTE.

== External sources ==
- Profile and stats at Srbijafudbal
