= Ivica Francišković =

Serbian footballer

Personal information
- Full name: Ivica Francišković
- Date of birth: 28 September 1978 (age 48)
- Place of birth: Subotica, SR Serbia, SFR Yugoslavia
- Height: 1.76 m (5 ft 9 in)
- Position: Midfielder

Youth career
- Spartak Subotica

Senior career*
Years	Team	Apps	(Gls)
1994–1995	Spartak Subotica	1	(0)
1995–1996	Partizan	0	(0)
1996–2000	Spartak Subotica	71	(10)
2000–2005	Vojvodina	113	(12)
2006–2007	Zalaegerszeg	22	(3)
2007–2008	AEK Larnaca	9	(0)
2008–2010	Grbalj	62	(7)
2010–2012	Rudar Pljevlja	30	(6)
Total		308	(38)

International career
1999	FR Yugoslavia U21	1	(1)
- * Club domestic league appearances and goals

Ivica Francišković (Serbian Cyrillic: Ивица Францишковић; born 28 September 1978) is a Serbian retired footballer of Vojvodinian Croat descent who played as a midfielder. He was capped for FR Yugoslavia at the under-21 level.

== Club career ==
Francišković started out at his hometown club Spartak Subotica. He spent most of his career with Vojvodina, making 113 league appearances and scoring 12 goals between 2000 and 2005. In the latter stages of his career, Francišković also played in Hungary, Cyprus, and Montenegro.

== Statistics ==
Club	Season	League	
Club	Season	Apps	Goals
Spartak Subotica	1999–2000	34	5
Spartak Subotica	Total	34	5
Vojvodina	2000–01	24	6
Vojvodina	2001–02	13	0
Vojvodina	2002–03	26	0
Vojvodina	2003–04	24	2
Vojvodina	2004–05	26	4
Vojvodina	Total	113	12
Grbalj	2007–08	15	1
Grbalj	2008–09	28	3
Grbalj	2009–10	19	3
Grbalj	Total	62	7
Rudar Pljevlja	2010–11	24	4
Rudar Pljevlja	2011–12	6	2
Rudar Pljevlja	Total	30	6
Career total		239	30

== Honours ==
Rudar Pljevlja

- Montenegrin Cup: 2010–11
