= Alin Coțan =

Romanian footballer

Personal information
- Date of birth: 30 October 1982 (age 44)
- Place of birth: Timișoara, Romania
- Height: 1.78 m (5 ft 10 in)
- Position: Left midfielder

Team information
- Current team: Dittlofrod/Körnbach (manager)

Senior career*
| Years | Team | Apps | (Gls) |
| 2001–2004 | FC Oradea | 29 | (1) |
| 2004–2005 | Liberty Salonta | 12 | (5) |
| 2005–2006 | Sopron | 23 | (1) |
| 2006–2007 | UTA Arad | 12 | (0) |
| 2007–2009 | Petrolul Ploiești | 50 | (15) |
| 2009–2010 | Chimia Brazi | | |
| 2010–2011 | Turnu Severin | 2 | (0) |
| 2012–2014 | Național Sebiș | | |
| 2014–2015 | Obergeis/Untergeis | 16 | (17) |
| 2015–2016 | Festspielstadt Hersfeld | 24 | (18) |
| 2016–2018 | Johannesberg | 28 | (18) |
| 2018–2019 | Eiterfeld/Leimbach | 20 | (8) |
| Total | | 216 | (83) |

Managerial career
- 2018–2019: Eiterfeld/Leimbach
- 2019–2020: Dittlofrod/Körnbach
- * Club domestic league appearances and goals

Alin Coțan (born 30 October 1982) is a Romanian former footballer who played as a left midfielder for clubs such as: Bihor Oradea, FC Sopron, Petrolul Ploiești or SG Johannesberg, among others. After retirement, Coțan started to work as a football manager in the German lower division, at first for SG Eiterfeld/Leimbach, then moving to SG Dittlofrod/Körnbach.
