= Árpád Kulcsár =

Hungarian football player and manager (born 1974)

Personal information
- Date of birth: 7 October 1974 (age 52)
- Place of birth: Pécs, Hungary
- Height: 1.78 m (5 ft 10 in)
- Position: Midfielder

Youth career
- Pécs
- PEAC

Senior career*
Years	Team	Apps	(Gls)
1994–1997	DD Gáz	64	(30)
1997–1998	Győr	0	(0)
1998	→ Vác (loan)	1	(0)
1998–2001	SC Sopron	85	(22)
2001–2009	Pécs	194	(44)
2009–2010	Dombóvár	22	(5)
2010–2011	Pogány	27	(4)
2011–2012	Szederkény	0	(0)
2012–2013	Szentlőrinc	6	(0)
Total		399	(105)

Managerial career
- 2012–2013: Szentlőrinc (player-manager)
- 2014: Pécs (assistant)
- 2014: Pécs (caretaker)
- 2023–2024: Pécs
- * Club domestic league appearances and goals

Árpád Kulcsár (born 7 October 1974) is a Hungarian professional football manager and player who last managed Pécs.

== Managerial career ==
=== Szentlőrinc ===
Kulcsár served as a player-manager for Nemzeti Bajnokság III club Szentlőrinc during the 2012–13 season. Under his leadership, the team advanced through the early rounds of the Magyar Kupa, achieving convincing victories over Csács-Nemesapáti (4–0) and Jánosháza (5–1) before being eliminated by Debrecen in a competitive match. In the league, Szentlőrinc finished the 26th matchday in fourth place in the NB III Dráva group but lost a two-round relegation playoff, resulting in relegation to the Megyei Bajnokság I. Kulcsár participated as a player in the latter part of the season, contributing directly on the field, where the team secured five consecutive victories and concluded the season with a draw. His dual role as player and manager helped guide the squad through both cup and league competitions while demonstrating tactical and on-field leadership.

=== Pécs ===
==== Initial stint ====
On 25 June 2014, Kulcsár joined Nemzeti Bajnokság I club Pécs as assistant manager. He took over as caretaker manager on 27 October following the dismissal of György Véber. Pécs lost all three of their matches under Kulcsár's stewardship before Robert Jarni was appointed on 24 November.

==== Second stint ====
On 21 November 2023, Kulcsár returned as head coach of Pécs in the Nemzeti Bajnokság II. On 20 February 2024, he stepped down as head coach by mutual agreement with PMFC’s management and resumed his previous role as head of youth development, having returned to coaching earlier that spring after recovering from a stroke over the winter, in order to focus on his health and the team’s future.

== Career statistics ==
=== Club ===
Appearances and goals by club, season and competition
Club	Season	League			Magyar Kupa		Ligakupa		Other		Total	
Club	Season	Division	Apps	Goals	Apps	Goals	Apps	Goals	Apps	Goals	Apps	Goals
DD Gáz	1994–95	Nemzeti Bajnokság III	26	11	—		—		—		26	11
DD Gáz	1995–96	Nemzeti Bajnokság III	9	13	—		—		—		9	13
DD Gáz	1996–97	Nemzeti Bajnokság II	29	6	—		—		—		29	6
DD Gáz	Total		64	30	—		—		—		64	30
Győr	1997–98	Nemzeti Bajnokság I	—		3	1	—		—		3	1
Vác (loan)	1997–98	Nemzeti Bajnokság I	1	0	—		—		—		1	0
SC Sopron	1998–99	Nemzeti Bajnokság II	33	11	—		—		—		33	11
SC Sopron	1999–2000	Nemzeti Bajnokság II	34	9	—		—		—		34	9
SC Sopron	2000–01	Nemzeti Bajnokság I	18	2	2	2	—		—		20	4
SC Sopron	Total		85	22	2	2	—		—		87	24
Pécs	2000–01	Nemzeti Bajnokság II	15	4	—		—		—		15	4
Pécs	2001–02	Nemzeti Bajnokság II	27	4	1	0	—		—		28	4
Pécs	2002–03	Nemzeti Bajnokság II	34	9	2	0	—		—		36	9
Pécs	2003–04	Nemzeti Bajnokság I	9	0	—		—		—		9	0
Pécs	2004–05	Nemzeti Bajnokság I	25	2	3	1	—		—		28	3
Pécs	2005–06	Nemzeti Bajnokság I	22	5	5	4	—		—		27	9
Pécs	2006–07	Nemzeti Bajnokság I	28	8	1	0	—		—		29	8
Pécs	2007–08	Nemzeti Bajnokság II	23	9	—		—		—		23	9
Pécs	2008–09	Nemzeti Bajnokság II	11	3	—		4	1	—		15	4
Pécs	Total		194	44	12	5	4	1	—		210	50
Dombóvár	2009–10	Nemzeti Bajnokság III	22	5	—		—		—		22	5
Pogány	2010–11	Nemzeti Bajnokság III	27	4	—		—		—		27	4
Szentlőrinc	2012–13	Nemzeti Bajnokság III	6	0	—		—		2 (Note: Appearances in Nemzeti Bajnokság III relegation play-offs)	0	8	0
Career total			399	105	17	8	4	1	2	0	422	114

== Honours ==
=== Player ===
DD Gáz

- Nemzeti Bajnokság III – Dráva: 1995–96

Pécs

- Nemzeti Bajnokság II: 2002–03
- Ligakupa runner-up: 2008–09
