= Nicola Silvestri =

Italian footballer

Personal information
- Date of birth: 21 November 1985 (age 40)
- Place of birth: Gavardo, Italy
- Height: 1.79 m (5 ft 10 1/2 in)
- Position: Midfielder

Team information
- Current team: Tsarsko Selo (assistant)

Youth career
- Brescia

Senior career*
Years	Team	Apps	(Gls)
2004–2005	Brescia	0	(0)
2004–2005	→ Viterbese (loan)	3	(0)
2006	Sopron	11	(0)
2006–2008	Genoa	0	(0)
2006–2007	→ Massese (loan)	16	(1)
2007–2008	→ Lanciano (loan)	17	(0)
2008–2011	Piacenza	3	(0)
2008–2009	→ Lumezzane (loan)	27	(0)
2011	Triestina	4	(0)
2011–2012	Venezia	15	(1)
2012	Matera	7	(0)
- * Club domestic league appearances and goals

Nicola Silvestri (born 21 November 1985) is an Italian footballer.

== Biography ==
Born in Gavardo, the Province of Brescia, Silvestri started his career with Brescia Calcio. In mid-2004, he left for Viterbese but the loan pre-matured in January 2005. In 2005–06 season, he left for Hungarian side Sopron, joining Giuseppe Signori and manager Dario Bonetti.

In July 2006 he was signed by Serie B club Genoa but was loaned to Serie C1 clubs Massese (along with Massimo Gazzoli) and Lanciano. In August 2008 he left for Serie B side Piacenza from Genoa, now a Serie A club on free transfer. However, he was loaned back to Lega Pro Prima Divisione (ex-Serie C1) for Lumezzane.

On 1 July 2009 he returned to Piacenza but only played 3 Serie B matches. He started his first Serie B match as central midfielder and partnered with Radja Nainggolan. However, he only collected 3 appearances in 2009–10 Serie B.

On 31 August 2011 he was signed by Prima Divisione club Triestina on free transfer. However, he was injured in October.
