= Čedomir Pavičević =

Serbian footballer

Čedomir Pavićević
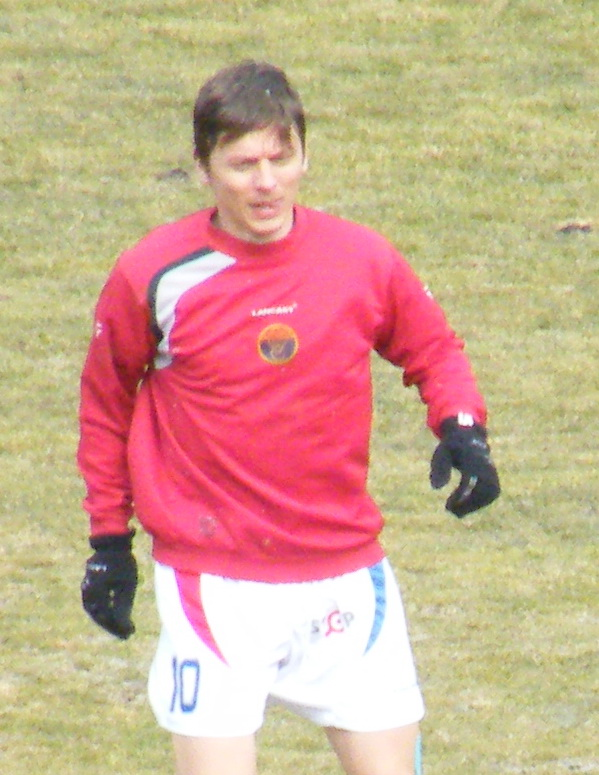
- Pavićević with Vasas in 2011

Personal information
- Full name: Čedomir Pavićević
- Date of birth: 23 May 1978 (age 48)
- Place of birth: Subotica, SFR Yugoslavia
- Height: 1.78 m (5 ft 10 in)
- Position: Midfielder

Senior career*
Years	Team	Apps	(Gls)
1996–1999	AIK Bačka Topola		
1999–2003	OFK Beograd	76	(0)
2003–2007	Pécs	90	(3)
2007–2011	Vasas	79	(2)
2011–2013	Eger	36	(1)
Total		281	(6)
- * Club domestic league appearances and goals

Čedomir Pavićević (Serbian Cyrillic: Чедомир Павићевић; born 23 May 1978) is a Serbian retired footballer who played as a midfielder.
