= Gábor Bagoly =

Hungarian footballer

Personal information
- Date of birth: 27 April 1973 (age 53)
- Place of birth: Nyíregyháza, Hungary
- Height: 1.85 m (6 ft 1 in)
- Position: Defender

Team information
- Current team: SC Neusiedl 1919
- Number: 16

Youth career
- 1987–1995: Nyíregyháza Spartacus

Senior career*
Years	Team	Apps	(Gls)
1995–2000	Debreceni VSC	75	(11)
1997	→ Nyíregyháza Spartacus (loan)	13	(0)
1998	→ KCFC-Hajdúszoboszló (loan)	?	(?)
2000–2003	Dunaújváros FC	63	(7)
2003–2007	FC Sopron	99	(12)
2007–2008	Nyíregyháza Spartacus	22	(3)
2008–	SC Neusiedl 1919	81	(13)
- * Club domestic league appearances and goals

Gábor Bagoly (born 27 April 1973 in Nyíregyháza) is a Hungarian football (defender) player who currently plays for SC Neusiedl 1919.
