= Tibor Kalina =

Hungarian footballer

Personal information
- Full name: Tibor Kalina
- Date of birth: 10 October 1976 (age 50)
- Place of birth: Budapest, Hungary
- Height: 1.87 m (6 ft 2 in)
- Position: Striker

Team information
- Current team: FC Lenganu

Senior career*
Years	Team	Apps	(Gls)
1998	FC Haka	5	(1)
1998–1999	Dunakeszi	31	(22)
1999–2000	?		
2000–2001	Kecskeméti TE	23	(10)
2001–2002	Újpest FC	4	(0)
2002–2003	?		
2003	Győri ETO FC	9	(2)
2004–2005	Dunaújváros FC	41	(18)
2005–2006	Pécsi Mecsek FC	22	(5)
2006	Szolnoki MÁV	10	(0)
2007–2008	SR Delémont	34	(12)
2008	SC Kriens		
2009–2021	FC Solothurn		
2021-	FC Lenganu		
- * Club domestic league appearances and goals as of 3 December 2007

Tibor Kalina was born on 10 October 1976, in Budapest, he is a Hungarian former football player.

== Playing career ==
He played for more than 11 different teams, during his football career.

== Football Coaching ==
He is now coach at FC Lengnau
