= János Győri =

Hungarian footballer

Personal information
- Date of birth: 10 September 1976 (age 50)
- Place of birth: Komló, Hungary
- Height: 1.89 m (6 ft 2 in)
- Position: Defender

Youth career
- Komlói Bányász

Senior career*
Years	Team	Apps	(Gls)
1995–1997	Pécsi Mecsek FC	48	(3)
1997–1999	BFC Siófok	60	(7)
1999–2001	Győri ETO FC	62	(3)
2001–2003	MTK Budapest	14	(2)
2003–2004	Bodajk	?	(?)
2004–2005	Vasas SC	19	(2)
2005	FC Sopron	6	(0)
2006–2008	Pécsi Mecsek FC	28	(0)
2008–2009	Komlói Bányász SK	29	(2)

International career
1996–1997	Hungary U-21	2	(0)
2001–2002	Hungary	2	(0)
- * Club domestic league appearances and goals

János Győri (born 10 September 1976) is a Hungarian former football player.
