= Darko Perić (footballer) =

Croatian footballer

Personal information
- Date of birth: 16 February 1978 (age 48)
- Height: 1.80 m (5 ft 11 in)
- Position: Winger

Senior career*
Years	Team	Apps	(Gls)
1996–2001	NK Zagreb	83	(5)
1997	→ Zadar (loan)	7	(0)
2001–2002	Šibenik	23	(1)
2002–2005	Győr	58+	(25+)
2006	Zalaegerszeg	21	(1)
2006-2008	HAŠK		
2007	→ Elbasani (loan)	12	(1)
2008	→ Vinogradar (loan)		
2009	Kukmirn	12	(5)
2009	Radnik Križevci		
2010-2011	Ivanja Reka		
- * Club domestic league appearances and goals

Darko Perić (born 16 February 1978) is a Croatian retired football player who often played as a right winger.

== Career ==
Perić previously played for NK Zagreb and HNK Šibenik in the Croatian Prva HNL and KS Elbasani in Albania. He also had a spell with Austrian lower league outfit Kukmirn.
