= András Dienes =

Hungarian footballer

Personal information
- Date of birth: 15 October 1974 (age 52)
- Place of birth: Pécs, Hungary
- Height: 1.79 m (5 ft 10 in)
- Position: Defender

Team information
- Current team: Kozármisleny SE

Youth career
- Pécsi Mecsek FC

Senior career*
Years	Team	Apps	(Gls)
1991–1996	Pécsi Mecsek FC	122	(0)
1997	Pécs '96 FC	?	(?)
1997–2001	Pécsi Mecsek FC	?	(?)
2001–2002	Győri ETO FC	7	(0)
2002–2007	Pécsi Mecsek FC	181	(1)
2007–2008	FC Tatabánya	21	(0)
2008–	Kozármisleny SE	42	(0)
- * Club domestic league appearances and goals as of 23 January 2010

András Dienes (born 15 October 1974) is a Hungarian football player.
