= József Szabados =

Hungarian footballer

Personal information
- Date of birth: 2 December 1971 (age 54)
- Place of birth: Budapest, Hungary
- Height: 1.76 m (5 ft 9 in)
- Position: Defender

Senior career*
Years	Team	Apps	(Gls)
1991–1994	Kispesti Honvéd FC		
1995–1997	Pécs		
2000–2003	Matáv Sopron		
2003–2009	Pécs		
- * Club domestic league appearances and goals

József Szabados (born 2 December 1971) is a retired Hungarian football defender.

== Honours ==
Kispesti-Honvéd

- Nemzeti Bajnokság I: 1992–93
