= Zsolt Szekeres =

Hungarian footballer

Personal information
- Full name: Zsolt Szekeres
- Date of birth: 12 July 1975 (age 51)
- Place of birth: Hungary
- Height: 1.83 m (6 ft 0 in)
- Position: Defender

Senior career*
Years	Team	Apps	(Gls)
–	FC Fehérvár	–	(–)
–	Polgardi	–	(–)
–	Sukoro	–	(–)
–	Honved Szondi Velence	–	(–)
–	FC Tatabánya	–	(–)
1999–2000	Gázszer FC	–	(–)
2003–2007	Pécsi Mecsek FC	–	(–)
2007–2008	Soroksar	14	(1)
2008	EB/Streymur	–	(-)
- * Club domestic league appearances and goals

Zsolt Szekeres (born 12 July 1975) is a Hungarian football player.
