= József Sebők =

Hungarian footballer

Personal information
- Full name: József Sebők
- Date of birth: 18 June 1975 (age 51)
- Place of birth: Keszthely, Hungary
- Height: 1.81 m (5 ft 11 1/2 in)
- Position: Striker

Senior career*
| Years | Team | Apps | (Gls) |
| 1993–1995 | Keszthely SE | 38 | (10) |
| 1995–2000 | Zalaegerszegi TE | 161 | (34) |
| 2000–2004 | AEL Limassol | 76 | (31) |
| 2004–2005 | Zalaegerszegi TE | 38 | (10) |
| 2005–2006 | AEL Limassol | 11 | (5) |
| 2006–2007 | Zalaegerszegi TE | 30 | (10) |
| 2007–2010 | Nafta Lendava | 46 | (11) |
| 2009 | → Hévíz (loan) | | |

International career
| 1998–2004 | Hungary | 12 | (2) |
- * Club domestic league appearances and goals as of 17 September 2009

József Sebők (born 18 June 1975 in Keszthely) is a retired Hungarian international football striker.

== Career ==
He started his career at his home town club Keszthely SE from where he moved in 1995 to Zalaegerszegi TE. He played with ZTE for five consecutive seasons in Hungarian top league before moving in 2000 to Cyprus, where he played for AEL Limassol. In 2007, he signed with Slovenian First League club NK Nafta Lendava. He finished his career back in Hungary with Hévíz FC.

== National team ==
Between 1998 and 2004 József Sebők played 12 matches for the Hungary national team having scored twice. Earlier he had been a member of the Hungary U-21 team.
