= Iván Balaskó =

Hungarian footballer

Personal information
- Date of birth: 14 September 1979 (age 47)
- Place of birth: Budapest, Hungary
- Height: 1.83 m (6 ft 0 in)
- Position: Midfielder

Team information
- Current team: CF Liberty Salonta

Youth career
- 1993–1995: Budapest Honvéd FC
- 1995–1997: MTK Budapest FC

Senior career*
Years	Team	Apps	(Gls)
1997–2001	MTK Budapest FC	58	(9)
2000	→ BKV Előre SC (loan)	14	(2)
2001–2002	Dunaújváros FC	23	(4)
2002–2005	FC Sopron	66	(18)
2005–2007	Pécsi MFC	35	(9)
2007–2008	Paksi SE	20	(1)
2008–2009	Rákospalotai EAC	9	(0)
2009–	CF Liberty Salonta	?	(?)

International career
1996–1997	Hungary U-17	12	(4)
1998–2000	Hungary U-21	9	(1)
- * Club domestic league appearances and goals

Iván Balaskó (born 14 September 1979 in Budapest) is a Hungarian football (Midfielder) player who currently plays for CF Liberty Salonta.
