= Endre Bajúsz =

Serbian former footballer

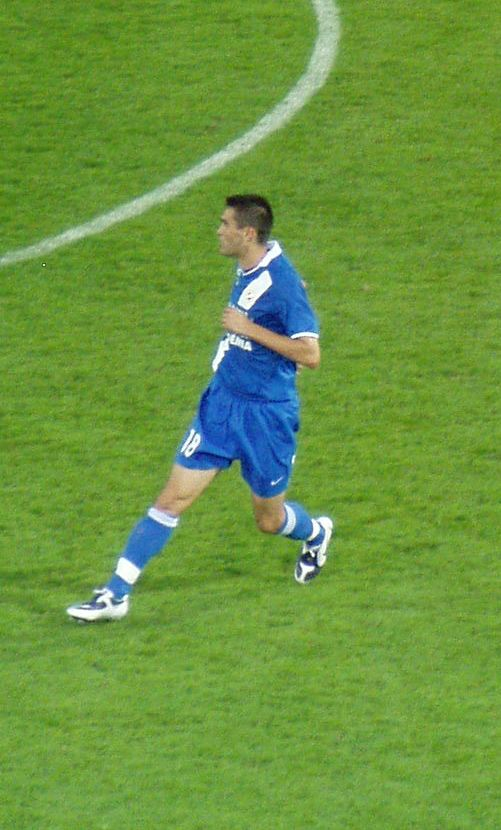

Personal information
- Date of birth: 21 October 1976 (age 50)
- Place of birth: Senta, Yugoslavia
- Height: 1.93 m (6 ft 4 in)
- Position: Right-back

Youth career
- RFK Novi Sad

Senior career*
Years	Team	Apps	(Gls)
1998–1999	Vojvodina	0	(0)
1999–2002	Győr	52	(1)
2000–2001	MTE-Motim	13	(1)
2002–2003	Szolnok	28	(0)
2003–2007	Pécs	83	(2)
2007–2009	MTK Budapest	9	(0)
2008–2009	→ MTK Budapest II	9	(0)
2010–2012	Senta	4	(0)
2011	→ AFK Ada (loan)		
- * Club domestic league appearances and goals as of 1 July 2011

Endre Bajúsz (Serbian: Ендре Бајус, Endre Bajus; born 21 October 1976) is a Serbian retired professional footballer.

== Career ==
Bajúsz played with Serbian top league club FK Vojvodina before moving to Hungary where he played for Győri ETO FC, MTE-Motim, Szolnoki MÁV, Pécsi Mecsek FC and MTK Hungária FC. In summer 2010 he moved back to Serbia joining FK Senta in the Serbian League Vojvodina.
