= 2005–06 Pápa TFC season =

Pápa
2005–06 season
- Owner: Péter Bíró
- Manager: Lázár Szentes (until 14 November 2005); Gyula Zsivóczky (caretaker, from 14 November to 27 December); György Gálhidi (from 27 December to 27 March 2006); Gyula Zsivóczky (interim, from 29 March)
- Stadium: Perutz Stadion
- Nemzeti Bajnokság I: 16th (relegated)
- Magyar Kupa: Round of 16
- UEFA Intertoto Cup: Second round
- Highest home attendance: 3,500 v Göteborg (3 July 2005, UEFA Intertoto Cup)
- Lowest home attendance: 700 v Rákospalota (26 November 2005, Nemzeti Bajnokság I)
- Average home league attendance: 1,847
- Biggest win: 3–0 v Celldömölk (Away, 21 September 2005, Magyar Kupa)
- Biggest defeat: 0–7 v MTK (Away, 15 October 2005, Nemzeti Bajnokság I)

The 2005–06 season was Pápa Termál Football Club's 2nd competitive season, 2nd consecutive season in the Nemzeti Bajnokság I and 11th season in existence as a football club. In addition to the domestic league, Pápa participated in that season's editions of the Magyar Kupa and the UEFA Intertoto Cup.

== Squad ==
Squad at end of season

Note: Flags indicate national team as defined under FIFA eligibility rules; some limited exceptions apply. Players may hold more than one non-FIFA nationality.

No.	Pos.	Nation	Player
2	DF	ZAM	Misheck Lungu
4	DF	HUN	Zoltán Lipták
5	MF	HUN	Zoltán Szabó I
6	MF	HUN	Balázs Lászka
7	FW	CAN	Dave Simpson
8	DF	ITA	Guilherme D'Arrigo
9	MF	HUN	Zsolt Müller
10	MF	BRA	Élder Campos
11	FW	BRA	Fabinho
14	FW	JPN	Kazuo Honma
17	DF	HUN	Attila Farkas
18	MF	HUN	Zoltán Szabó II
19	DF	HUN	Dániel Varga
20	FW	CAN	Franco Lalli

No.	Pos.	Nation	Player
21	FW	SVK	Simeon Stevica
22	GK	HUN	Lajos Szűcs
23	MF	HUN	Péter Kincses
24	DF	HUN	Tamás Geri
25	DF	HUN	Tamás Tóth
26	MF	BRA	Edu Valinhos
29	MF	HUN	László Némethy
30	DF	HUN	László Gaál
33	DF	ZAM	Lloyd Mumba
77	FW	HUN	Gábor Újhegyi
79	GK	HUN	András Dombai
81	FW	HUN	András Kozarek
—	FW	CAN	Joevannie Peart

== Competitions ==
=== Overview ===
Competition	First match	Last match	Starting round	Final position	Record							
Competition	First match	Last match	Starting round	Final position	Pld	W	D	L	GF	GA	GD	Win %
Nemzeti Bajnokság I	30 July 2005	3 June 2006	Matchday 1	16th	30	5	7	18	30	76	−46	16.67
Magyar Kupa	21 September 2005	12 November 2005	Third round	Round of 16	3	1	1	1	7	5	+2	33.33
UEFA Intertoto Cup	19 June 2005	9 July 2005	First round	Second round	4	2	0	2	5	5	+0	50.00
Total					37	8	8	21	42	86	−44	21.62

Source: Competitions

=== Nemzeti Bajnokság I ===
==== League table ====
Pos	Team	Pld	W	D	L	GF	GA	GD	Pts	Qualification or relegation
12	Pécs	30	8	9	13	37	41	−4	33	
13	Honvéd	30	8	9	13	33	52	−19	33	
14	Rákospalota	30	7	5	18	30	59	−29	26	
15	Vasas	30	5	10	15	32	47	−15	25	
16	Pápa (R)	30	5	7	18	30	76	−46	22	Relegated to Nemzeti Bajnokság II

Source: RSSSF
(R) Relegated

==== Results summary ====
Overall								Home						Away					
Pld	W	D	L	GF	GA	GD	Pts	W	D	L	GF	GA	GD	W	D	L	GF	GA	GD
30	5	7	18	30	76	−46	22	4	3	8	19	35	−16	1	4	10	11	41	−30

Source: Competitions

==== Matches ====
30 July 2005 1	Tatabánya	1–1	Pápa	Tatabánya
18:00 CEST (UTC+2)	Dupai (yellow card) 2'; Márkus 12'	Report	Újhegyi 16'; Müller (yellow card) 35'	Stadium: Városi Stadion; Attendance: 2,500; Referee: Attila Dubraviczky; Assistant referees: Kispál, I. A. Nagy

6 August 2005 2	Pápa	1–2	Sopron	Pápa
19:00 CEST (UTC+2)	Lipták (yellow card) 16'; Kovrig (yellow card) 24', (goal) 89' (pen.); Szkukalek (yellow card) 43'; Lászka (yellow card) 49'	Report	A. Horváth I (yellow card) 14', (goal) 41'; Zo. Fehér (yellow card) 24'; Bagoly (yellow card) 35'; Ibric 45', (yellow card) 90+2'	Stadium: Perutz Stadion; Attendance: 2,200; Referee: Zsolt Szabó; Assistant referees: I. Mészáros, Hegyi

21 August 2005 3	Ferencváros	3–3	Pápa	Budapest
11:30 CEST (UTC+2)	Jovánczai 6'; Mutică 40' (o.g.); D. Rósa 41'; Tímár (yellow card) 64'; Zo. Balog (yellow card) 67'; Á. Takács (yellow card) 77'	Report	Róth 48', 67' (pen.), 73', (yellow card) 67'; Lipták (yellow card) 68'	Stadium: Üllői úti Stadion; Attendance: 1,500; Referee: Tamás Arany; Assistant referees: Z. Tompos, T. Vígh

27 August 2005 4	Pápa	2–2	Honvéd	Pápa
19:00 CEST (UTC+2)	Herczeg 28', (yellow card); Lipták 58'; Remili (yellow card); Kincses (yellow card)	Report	Csobánki 13', (yellow card); Genito 66'; Z. Takács (yellow card); Dobos (yellow card); Z. Kovács II (yellow card); Zana (yellow card)	Stadium: Perutz Stadion; Attendance: 2,300; Referee: Attila Hanacsek; Assistant referees: Dr. P. Szabó, Dr. P. Kovács; Fourth official: N. Kiss

17 September 2005 5	Fehérvár	2–1	Pápa	Székesfehérvár
19:00 CEST (UTC+2)	B. Farkas II 22'; Z. Vincze 43'; Schwarcz (yellow card) 82'; D. Nagy (yellow card) 87'	Report	Remili (yellow card) 24'; Kuttor 90' (o.g.)	Stadium: Sóstói Stadion; Attendance: 4,000; Referee: Viktor Kassai; Assistant referees: G. Erős, A. Kelemen

24 September 2005 6	Zalaegerszeg	5–0	Pápa	Zalaegerszeg
19:00 CEST (UTC+2)	V. Sebők 19' (pen.), 69' (pen.); Sabo 48'; Montvai 56'; Spasojević 84', (yellow card) 85'	Report	Kovrig (yellow card) 19'; Lipták (yellow card) 20'; Remili (yellow card) 76'; Honma (yellow card) 87'; Facskó (yellow card) 89'	Stadium: ZTE Arena; Attendance: 4,500; Referee: Zoltán Szarka; Assistant referees: P. Szabó, V. Kovács

1 October 2005 7	Pápa	0–0	Kaposvár	Pápa
18:00 CEST (UTC+2)	Mutică (yellow card) 20'; Szkukalek (yellow card) 29' (yellow-red card) 74'; Facskó (red card) 34'	Report	Nagypál (yellow card) 63'	Stadium: Perutz Stadion; Attendance: 1,200; Referee: Attila Dubraviczki; Assistant referees: P. Kovács, I. Nagy

15 October 2005 8	MTK	7–0	Pápa	Budapest
18:00 CEST (UTC+2)	Kanta 4', 59' (pen.); Mutică 17' (o.g.); B. Balogh 22'; Lambulić 56'; Bori 73'; Czvitkovics 88'	Report	A. Farkas (yellow card) 58'	Stadium: Hidegkuti Nándor Stadion; Attendance: 1,000; Referee: Attila Hanacsek; Assistant referees: P. Kovács, I. Tóth

22 October 2005 9	Pápa	1–4	Győr	Pápa
18:00 CEST (UTC+2)	Stark 48' (o.g.); Lipták (yellow card) 67'; Kincses (yellow card) 77'	Report	Kenesei 45', 60'; Vincze 79', 80'; R. Horváth (yellow card) 88'	Stadium: Perutz Stadion; Attendance: 1,600; Referee: József Erdős; Assistant referees: Gaál, L. Varga II

29 October 2005 10	Újpest	3–1	Pápa	Budapest
18:00 CEST (UTC+2)	Feczesin 33', 38', (yellow card) 41'; Vaskó (yellow card) 61'; N. Tóth 67' (pen.)	Report	Remili (yellow card) 39'; A. Farkas 45'	Stadium: Szusza Ferenc Stadion; Attendance: 3,567; Referee: István Vad; Assistant referees: Z. Szalai, I. Albert

5 November 2005 11	Pápa	1–3	Diósgyőr	Pápa
18:00 CET (UTC+1)	Lászka (yellow card) 28'; Kovrig 84'; Müller (yellow card) 90'	Report	V. Farkas (yellow card) 2'; F. Horváth 21'; Tisza 29' (pen.), 74', (yellow card) 55'; Vámosi (yellow card) 83'	Stadium: Perutz Stadion; Attendance: 1,200; Referee: Sándor Gergely; Assistant referees: Tompos, L. Varga II

19 November 2005 12	Vasas	1–1	Pápa	Budapest
15:00 CET (UTC+1)	Völgyi (yellow card) 29'; Zováth (yellow card) 31'; Gyánó (yellow card) 35'; A. Tóth (yellow card) 65'; Bárányos 85'	Report	Kovrig 8'; Kincses (yellow card) 40'; Facskó (yellow card) 45'; Mumba (yellow card) 49'	Stadium: Illovszky Rudolf Stadion; Attendance: 1,000; Referee: Csaba Imre Sápi; Assistant referees: L. Tóth L., T. Végh

26 November 2005 13	Pápa	1–3	Rákospalota	Pápa
17:00 CET (UTC+1)	Müller (yellow card) 26' (yellow-red card) 70'; Hercegfalvi 44'; Lászka (yellow card) 73'; Herczeg (yellow card) 84'	Report	Cseri (yellow card) 7', (goal) 20'; G. Horváth I (yellow card) 64'; Nyerges 71'; Torma 90'	Stadium: Perutz Stadion; Attendance: 700; Referee: Mihály Fábián

3 December 2005 14	Pécs	5–0	Pápa	Pécs
15:00 CET (UTC+1)	Kalina 4', 86', 88', 90'; Berdó 29', (yellow card) 30'; N. Sipos (yellow card) 60'	Report	Lipták (yellow card) 20'; A. Farkas (red card) 60'; Geri (yellow card) 73' (yellow-red card) 87'	Stadium: Stadion PMFC; Attendance: 500; Referee: Zoltán Szarka; Assistant referees: Hegyi, L. Varga II

10 December 2005 15	Pápa	3–3	Debrecen	Pápa
15:00 CET (UTC+1)	Hercegfalvi 10'; Honma 46'; Kovrig (yellow card) 67', (goal) 88' (pen.); Lászka (yellow card) 79'	Report	Brnović 16'; Sidibe 23'; Bernáth (yellow card) 25' (yellow-red card) 73'; Ferenczi 68' (pen.); P. Máté II (yellow card) 87'; Halmosi (yellow card) 89'	Stadium: Perutz Stadion; Attendance: 1,000; Referee: János Megyebíró; Assistant referees: P. Tóth, I. Albert

25 February 2006 16	Pápa	0–5	Tatabánya	Pápa
16:00 CET (UTC+1)	L. Gaál (yellow card) 28' (yellow-red card) 46'; D. Varga (yellow card) 85'	Report	Hajdú 5', 44'; Mumba 20' (o.g.); Kouemaha 35'; Deme 36'; Filó (yellow card) 87'	Stadium: Perutz Stadion; Attendance: 1,600; Referee: István Vad; Assistant referees: Kispál, Szalay

4 March 2006 17	Sopron	2–0	Pápa	Sopron
16:00 CET (UTC+1)	Demjén 37'; Cigan 69'	Report	Stevica (yellow card) 27'	Stadium: Káposztás utcai Stadion; Attendance: 2,600; Referee: József Erdős; Assistant referees: T. Vámos, Z. Tompos

10 March 2006 18	Pápa	1–5	Ferencváros	Pápa
19:00 CET (UTC+1)	Simpson (yellow card) 19', (goal) 28'; Lipták (yellow card) 40'; D. Varga (yellow card) 52' (yellow-red card) 76'; Szűcs (yellow card) 53'	Report	Tímár (yellow card) 15'; Lipcsei (yellow card) 16', (goal) 71' (pen.); Bognár (yellow card) 40'; Laczkó 63'; Bajevski 68'; Jovánczai 82', 84'	Stadium: Perutz Stadion; Attendance: 2,700; Referee: János Makai; Assistant referees: P. Szabó, Z. Kovács

18 March 2006 19	Honvéd	1–0	Pápa	Budapest
16:00 CET (UTC+1)	Bozori 78'	Report	Lungu (yellow card) 71'	Stadium: Bozsik József Stadion; Attendance: 1,200; Referee: Sándor Gergely; Assistant referees: P. Hegyi, L. Varga II

25 March 2006 20	Pápa	0–2	Fehérvár	Pápa
17:00 CET (UTC+1)	D'Arrigo (yellow card) 23'; Lipták (yellow card) 33'; Mumba (yellow card) 65'	Report	Sitku 29' (pen.), 61'; Z. Vincze (yellow card) 80'; Tudor (yellow card) 81'; Koller (yellow card) 84'; D. Nagy (yellow card) 90+1'	Stadium: Perutz Stadion; Attendance: 2,000; Referee: Viktor Kassai; Assistant referees: G. Erős, Z. Szalai

1 April 2006 21	Pápa	2–1	Zalaegerszeg	Pápa
17:00 CEST (UTC+2)	L. Gaál (yellow card) 40'; D'Arrigo (yellow card) 61'; Mumba 71'; Lipták (yellow card) 74'; Kincses 85'	Report	Perić (red card) 36'; J. Sebők 77', (yellow card) 84'; Bingo (yellow card) 86'; Kocsárdi (yellow card) 90'	Stadium: Perutz Stadion; Attendance: 2,000; Referee: Csaba Imre Sápi; Assistant referees: I. A. Nagy, L. Tóth L.

8 April 2006 22	Kaposvár	1–0	Pápa	Kaposvár
17:00 CEST (UTC+2)	Oláh (yellow card) 35'; P. Máté I (yellow card) 85'; Alves 88'	Report	A. Farkas (yellow card) 17'; Lipták (yellow card) 43' (yellow-red card) 63'; Simpson (yellow card) 51'; Müller (yellow card) 77' (yellow-red card) 86'	Stadium: Rákóczi Stadion; Attendance: 2,000; Referee: Tamás Bognár; Assistant referees: P. Szabó, Z. Kovács

15 April 2006 23	Pápa	1–3	MTK	Pápa
18:00 CEST (UTC+2)	D’Arrigo (yellow card) 74', (red card) (after the match); L. Gaál (yellow card) 83'; Élder 90'	Report	Czvitkovics 6'; Lambulić 22'; Lipcsei (yellow card) 64'; B. Balogh (yellow card) 75'; Hrepka 90'	Stadium: Perutz Stadion; Attendance: 1,700; Referee: Tamás Arany; Assistant referees: P. Szabó, B. Gaál

22 April 2006 24	Győr	4–0	Pápa	Győr
18:00 CEST (UTC+2)	Priskin 6', 64'; Mátyus 19' (pen.); Bajzát 35'; P. Tóth (yellow card) 79'	Report	Lipták (yellow card) 27'; Honma (yellow card) 54'; L. Gaál (yellow card) 78'; Élder (yellow card) 84'; Zo. Szabó II (yellow card) 89'	Stadium: Stadion ETO; Attendance: 1,000; Referee: Zsolt Szabó; Assistant referees: T.Vámos, B. Világi

28 April 2006 25	Pápa	2–1	Újpest	Pápa
19:00 CEST (UTC+2)	D. Varga (yellow card) 38'; Kincses (yellow card) 41'; Fabinho 43'; Honma 51'; Simpson (yellow card) 81' (yellow-red card) 90+2'	Report	Erős (yellow card) 57'; Füzi (yellow card) 60'; Vituska (yellow card) 85'; N. Tóth 87'	Stadium: Perutz Stadion; Attendance: 2,500; Referee: Ferenc Bede; Assistant referees: Kispál, Tompos

6 May 2006 26	Diósgyőr	0–1	Pápa	Miskolc
19:00 CEST (UTC+2)	Vitelki (yellow card) 29'	Report	Zo. Szabó II 8'; Élder (yellow card) 16'; L. Gaál (yellow card) 65'	Stadium: Diósgyőri Stadion; Attendance: 3,500; Referee: Sándor Andó-Szabó; Assistant referees: Szpisják, P. Tóth

13 May 2006 27	Pápa	1–0	Vasas	Pápa
19:00 CEST (UTC+2)	Honma (yellow card) 59'; Zo. Szabó II 90'	Report	G. Hegedűs (yellow card) 22'; Janjić (yellow card) 79'	Stadium: Perutz Stadion; Attendance: 3,000; Referee: Tamás Arany; Assistant referees: G. Kovács, I. A. Nagy

20 May 2006 28	Rákospalota	2–2	Pápa	Budapest
18:00 CEST (UTC+2)	Földvári 34'; Nyerges 64' (pen.); Szirtesi (yellow card) 72'; Polonkai (red card) 90'	Report	D'Arrigo (yellow card) 3' (yellow-red card) 90'; Kozarek 9'; L. Gaál (yellow card) 20'; A. Farkas (yellow card) 27'; D. Varga (yellow card) 64'; Fabinho 73'	Stadium: Budai II. László Stadion; Attendance: 1,500; Referee: János Megyebíró; Assistant referees: Szpisják, Vígh

27 May 2006 29	Pápa	3–1	Pécs	Pápa
19:00 CEST (UTC+2)	Élder (yellow card) 12'; Fabinho (yellow card) 34'; Lipták 63', 88'; A. Farkas (yellow card) 79'; Kincses (yellow card) 90'; Honma 90+1'	Report	Lantos (yellow card) 55'; N. Sipos (yellow card) 69'; Jevdjovic 73'; Szekeres (yellow card) 76'	Stadium: Perutz Stadion; Attendance: 2,000; Referee: István Mészáros; Assistant referees: G. Kovács, Deutsch

3 June 2006 30	Debrecen	4–1	Pápa	Debrecen
16:20 CEST (UTC+2)	T. Sándor 21'; Brnović 45'; Halmosi 58'; Bogdanović 82'	Report	Fabinho 42'; Mumba (yellow card) 80'	Stadium: Oláh Gábor utcai Stadion; Attendance: 11,000; Referee: Sándor Andó-Szabó; Assistant referees: Székely, I. Tóth

=== Magyar Kupa ===
21 September 2005 Third round	Celldömölk	0–3	Pápa	Celldömölk
15:30 CEST (UTC+2)	Bodor (yellow card)	Report	Facskó (yellow card) , (goal) 38'; Kovrig (yellow card); Lipták (yellow card); Müller (yellow card); Újhegyi 55'; Honma 75'	Stadium: Kolozsvár utcai Pálya; Attendance: 1,200; Referee: N. Kiss; Assistant referees: Deutsch, Z. Szalai

==== Round of 16 ====
26 October 2005 First leg	Vasas	3–3	Pápa	Budapest
17:00 CEST (UTC+2)	Zováth (yellow card); Bárányos 39', 53'; Gyánó 65'	Report	Facskó (yellow card); A. Farkas (yellow card); Lipták (yellow card); Kincses 12'; Hercegfalvi 31'; Nikolić 36'	Stadium: Illovszky Rudolf Stadion; Attendance: 600; Referee: Mihály Fábián; Assistant referees: Ortó, T. Márkus

12 November 2005 Second leg	Pápa	1–2 (4–5 agg.)	Vasas	Pápa
17:00 CET (UTC+1)	Nikolić 52'	Report	Majoros 11'; Waltner 29'	Stadium: Perutz Stadion; Attendance: 1,000; Referee: Tamás Arany; Assistant referees: Dr. P. Kovács, I. A. Nagy
Note: Vasas won 5–4 on aggregate.

=== UEFA Intertoto Cup ===
==== First round ====
19 June 2005 First leg	Pápa (Hungary)	2–1	(Georgia (country)) WIT Georgia	Pápa, Hungary
18:00 CEST (UTC+2)	Kovrig (yellow card) 29'; T. Szabó 60', 90+4' (pen.); Hercegfalvi (yellow card) 77'	Report	Lomaia (yellow card) 56'; Dighmelashvili (yellow card) 70'; P. Datunaishvili (yellow card) 73'; G. Datunaishvili (yellow card) 84' (yellow-red card) 88'; Ebanoidze 90+1'; Imedashvili (yellow card) 90+4'	Stadium: Perutz Stadion; Attendance: 1,500; Referee: Mengual Prades (Andorra); Assistant referees: Barbosa (Andorra), Cardoso (Andorra); Fourth official: Hanacsek (Hungary)

26 June 2005 Second leg	WIT Georgia (Georgia (country))	0–1 (1–3 agg.)	(Hungary) Pápa	Tbilisi, Georgia
	Kurshashvili (yellow card) 74'; Dighmelashvili (yellow card) 86'	Report	Lipták (yellow card) 15'; Hercegfalvi (yellow card) 35' (yellow-red card) 54', (goal) 50'; Geri (yellow card) 84'; Császár (yellow card) 86'	Stadium: Boris Paichadze National Stadium; Attendance: 1,500; Referee: Robert Krajnc (Slovenia); Assistant referees: Kokolj (Slovenia), Kogej (Slovenia); Fourth official: Szilagava (Georgia)
Note: Pápa won 3–1 on aggregate.

==== Second round ====
3 July 2005 First leg	Pápa (Hungary)	2–3	(Sweden) Göteborg	Pápa, Hungary
18:00 CEST (UTC+2)	T. Szabó 18'; Herczeg 64'; Mutică (yellow card) 65'	Report	Wowoah (yellow card) 32'; Mourad (yellow card) 47'; Selaković 66' (pen.); Johansson (yellow card) 73'; Berg 80'; Wendt 90+1'	Stadium: Perutz Stadion; Attendance: 3,500; Referee: Szvetan Georgiev (Bulgaria); Assistant referees: Jecsev (Bulgaria), Dzshuganszki (Bulgaria); Fourth official: Hanacsek (Hungary)

9 July 2005 Second leg	Göteborg (Sweden)	1–0 (4–2 agg.)	(Hungary) Pápa	Gothenburg, Sweden
15:30 CEST (UTC+2)	Wowoah (yellow card) 90'; Berg 90+3'	Report	Herczeg (yellow card) 14'; Lipták (yellow card) 25'	Stadium: Nya Ullevi; Attendance: 1,556; Referee: Sten Kaldma (Estonia); Assistant referees: Vinogradov (Estonia), Rozov (Estonia); Fourth official: Popovski (Sweden)
Note: Göteborg won 4–2 on aggregate.
