= 1999–2000 Ferencvárosi TC season =

Ferencvárosi TC
1999–2000 season
- Chairman: József Torgyán
- Manager: József Mucha (until 30 August) (Croatia) Stanko Poklepović
- Stadium: Üllői úti stadion
- NB 1: 5th
- Hungarian Cup: Round of 16
- UEFA Cup: 1st round
- Top goalscorer: League: (Hungary) Péter Horváth (21); All: (Hungary) Péter Horváth (24)
- Highest home attendance: 10,600 vs Újpest (15 April 2000)
- Lowest home attendance: 1,000 vs Győr (20 November 1999)

The 1999–2000 Ferencvárosi TC season lists the results of the Hungarian association football team Ferencvárosi TC in the 1999–2000.

== Transfers ==
=== Summer ===
In: Note: Flags indicate national team as defined under FIFA eligibility rules; some limited exceptions apply. Players may hold more than one non-FIFA nationality.

No.	Pos.	Nation	Player
2	DF	HUN	Tibor Baranyai (from Érd)
3	DF	HUN	Pál Lakos (from Győr)
8	FW	HUN	Péter Horváth (from Vác)
19	MF	HUN	Zsolt Bárányos (loan from (Belgium) Lommel)
21	FW	HUN	Mihály Tóth (from (France) Metz)
25	GK	HUN	Lajos Szűcs (loan from (Germany) Kaiserslautern)
—	DF	HUN	György Sallai (from Békéscsaba)

Out: Note: Flags indicate national team as defined under FIFA eligibility rules; some limited exceptions apply. Players may hold more than one non-FIFA nationality.

No.	Pos.	Nation	Player
2	DF	HUN	Tibor Simon (to BVSC Budapest)
3	DF	HUN	András Telek (to Dunakeszi)
8	MF	HUN	Elek Nyilas (to (Israel) Maccabi Ironi Ashdod)
12	MF	HUN	Miklós Lendvai (to (Belgium) Verbroedering Geel)
13	DF	HUN	Csaba Vámosi (to Győr)
16	FW	HUN	Dénes Eszenyi (to (Israel) Hapoel Ironi Rishon)
19	MF	CRO	Alen Bjelić (to (Croatia) NK Zagreb)
21	MF	HUN	Ottó Vincze (to (Germany) Waldhof Mannheim)
24	FW	HUN	Imre Szabics (to (Austria) Sturm Graz)
25	FW	HUN	Tibor Fodor (to Videoton)
—	GK	HUN	Tamás Nagy (to Cegléd)
—	MF	HUN	Zsolt Páling (to Diósgyőr)

=== Winter ===
In: Note: Flags indicate national team as defined under FIFA eligibility rules; some limited exceptions apply. Players may hold more than one non-FIFA nationality.

No.	Pos.	Nation	Player
9	FW	HUN	Kornél Rob (from Vác)
11	MF	HUN	Gábor Vén (from Vác)
12	MF	SVK	Norbert Csoknay (from Siófok)
13	MF	HUN	Zoltán Váczi (from Kispest)
17	DF	YUG	Dragan Crnomarković (from Nagykanizsa)

Out: Note: Flags indicate national team as defined under FIFA eligibility rules; some limited exceptions apply. Players may hold more than one non-FIFA nationality.

No.	Pos.	Nation	Player
1	GK	HUN	Milán Udvarácz (to (Australia) South Melbourne)
9	FW	SUI	Zenun Selimi (to (Switzerland) Young Boys)
13	MF	HUN	Zoltán Zöld (to (Australia) Melbourne Knights)
17	DF	HUN	János Mátyus (to (Germany) Energie Cottbus)
28	FW	HUN	Sándor Kulcsár (to Siófok)

=== Nemzeti Bajnokság I ===
==== League table ====
Pos	Team	Pld	W	D	L	GF	GA	GD	Pts	Qualification or relegation
3	Vasas	32	19	4	9	58	32	+26	61	Qualification for UEFA Cup qualifying round
4	Tatabánya	32	14	13	5	37	34	+3	55	Qualification for Intertoto Cup first round
5	Ferencváros	32	14	8	10	61	39	+22	50	
6	Debrecen	32	14	8	10	52	41	+11	50	
7	Pécs	32	11	12	9	41	47	−6	45	

Source: rsssf.com

==== Results summary ====
Overall								Home						Away					
Pld	W	D	L	GF	GA	GD	Pts	W	D	L	GF	GA	GD	W	D	L	GF	GA	GD
33	15	8	10	65	39	+26	53	9	4	4	40	14	+26	6	4	6	25	25	0

Last updated: 27 May 2000.
Source: NB1

==== Results by round ====
Round	1	2	3	4	5	6	7	8	9	10	11	12	13	14	15	16	17	18	19	20	21	22	23	24	25	26	27	28	29	30	31	32	33	34
Ground	H	A	H	A	H	A	H	A	H	A	H	A	H	H	A	H	A	A	H	A	H	A	H	A	H	A	H	A	H	A	A	H	A	H
Result	L	L	D	W	W	L	W	D	L	D	L	W	L	D	W	W	W	D	W	D	W	W	D	L	W	L	D	L	W	W	L	W	X	W
Position	15	16	15	11	11	11	8	10	10	12	13	10	10	10	9	9	8	9	6	6	5	4	4	5	4	6	6	7	5	5	5	5	5	5

Updated to match(es) played on 27 May 2000. Source: Matches
A = Away; H = Home; W = Win; D = Draw; L = Loss

==== Matches ====
6 August 1999 1	Ferencváros	1 – 2	Vasas	Budapest
20:00 CEST	Kovács 38'	Report	Galaschek 58'; Juhár 71' (pen.)	Stadium: Üllői úti stadion Attendance: 8,000; Referee: Ferenc Bede

15 August 1999 2	Gázszer	3 – 2	Ferencváros	Székesfehérvár
19:00 CEST	Gögh 10'; Lukács 22'; Árki 77'	Report	Lászka 6'; Tóth 41'	Stadium: Sóstói Stadion; Attendance: 5,000; Referee: Attila Ábrahám

21 August 1999 3	Ferencváros	1 – 1	Zalaegerszeg	Budapest
17:00 CEST	Kulcsár 75'	Report	Sebők 88'	Stadium: Üllői úti stadion Attendance: 5,500; Referee: Géza Kiss

29 August 1999 4	Vác	0 – 2	Ferencváros	Vác
19:00 CEST		Report	Kovács 49'; Bárányos 61'	Stadium: Városi Stadion; Attendance: 6,000; Referee: Zoltán Szarka

11 September 1999 5	Ferencváros	1 – 0	MTK Budapest	Budapest
17:00 CEST	Tóth 90'	Report		Stadium: Üllői úti stadion Attendance: 7,451; Referee: János Megyebíró

19 September 1999 6	Dunaferr	1 – 0	Ferencváros	Dunaújváros
16:00 CEST	Tököli 20'	Report		Stadium: Dunaferr Arena; Attendance: 10,000; Referee: Sándor Piller

25 September 1999 7	Ferencváros	4 – 0	Nyíregyháza	Budapest
19:00 CEST	Tóth 27'; Horváth 32', 89'; Mátyus 62' (pen.)	Report		Stadium: Üllői úti stadion Attendance: 5,874; Referee: Csaba Sápi

3 October 1999 8	Diósgyőr	0 – 0	Ferencváros	Miskolc
15:00 CEST		Report		Stadium: Diósgyőri Stadion; Attendance: 13,000; Referee: Ferenc Bede

16 October 1999 9	Ferencváros	0 – 1	Debrecen	Budapest
17:00 CEST		Report	Szatmári 55'	Stadium: Üllői úti stadion Attendance: 4,000; Referee: Attila Juhos

25 October 1999 10	Újpest	2 – 2	Ferencváros	Budapest
19:00 CEST	Terjék 71'; Tóth 83'	Report	Horváth 38', 45'	Stadium: Megyeri uti Stadium; Attendance: 7,000; Referee: Ferenc Bede

30 October 1999 11	Ferencváros	0 – 1	Tatabánya	Budapest
17:00 CET		Report	Kiss 58'	Stadium: Üllői úti stadion Attendance: 3,000; Referee: Zsolt Szabó

7 November 1999 12	Nagykanizsa	0 – 2	Ferencváros	Nagykanizsa
13:00 CET		Report	Horváth 6'; Bárányos 90+2'	Stadium: Olajbányász Sporttelep; Attendance: 10,000; Referee: Attila Ábrahám

13 November 1999 13	Ferencváros	1 – 2	Siófok	Budapest
17:00 CET	Horváth 13'	Report	K. Pest 11'; Kovács 32' (pen.)	Stadium: Üllői úti stadion Attendance: 2,500; Referee: Zoltán Szarka

20 November 1999 14	Ferencváros	2 – 2	Győr	Budapest
17:00 CET	Horváth 1'; Vayer 56' (o.g.)	Report	Herczeg 50'; Vayer 80'	Stadium: Üllői úti stadion Attendance: 1,000; Referee: Sándor Puhl

18 December 1999 15	Kispest	2 – 3	Ferencváros	Budapest
17:00 CET	Plókai 51'; Pintér 59'	Report	Horváth 43'; Tóth 87', 90'	Stadium: Bozsik Stadion; Attendance: 4,000; Referee: Tamás Arany

4 December 1999 16	Ferencváros	4 – 0	Szeged	Budapest
17:00 CET	Horváth 64', 79'; Bárányos 89'; Tóth 90'	Report		Stadium: Üllői úti stadion Attendance: 1,000; Referee: Attila Hajdó

11 December 1999 17	Haladás	0 – 2	Ferencváros	Szombathely
17:00 CET		Report	Horváth 30'; Tóth 53'	Stadium: Stadion Rohonci Ut; Attendance: 3,000; Referee: Attila Ábrahám

28 February 2000 18	Vasas	3 – 3	Ferencváros	Budapest
17:00 CET	Galaschek 31', 44'; Tiber 77'	Report	Vén 20', 21'; Tóth 41'	Stadium: Illovszky Rudolf Stadion; Attendance: 12,000; Referee: Zoltán Szarka

4 March 2000 19	Ferencváros	4 – 1	Pécs	Budapest
17:00 CET	Tóth 10', 57'; Bárányos 14'; Horváth 35'	Report	Puškaš 42'	Stadium: Üllői úti stadion Attendance: 5,587; Referee: Attila Juhos

8 March 2000 20	Zalaegerszeg	0 – 0	Ferencváros	Zalaegerszeg
17:00 CET		Report		Stadium: ZTE Arena; Attendance: 12,500; Referee: Attila Ábrahám

11 March 2000 21	Ferencváros	8 – 0	Vác	Budapest
17:00 CET	Koller 11' (o.g.); Horváth 12', 69'; Bárányos 18'; Váczi 27'; Tóth 37', 56'; Földvári 82'	Report		Stadium: Üllői úti stadion Attendance: 5,207; Referee: Attila Hajdó

18 March 2000 22	MTK Budapest	2 – 3	Ferencváros	Budapest
17:00 CET	Illés 18', 45'	Report	Bárányos 42'; Füzi 45'; Tóth 68'	Stadium: Hungária körúti stadion Attendance: 4,000; Referee: Attila Hanacsek

25 March 2000 23	Ferencváros	2 – 2	Dunaferr	Budapest
17:00 CET	Tóth 48', 53'	Report	Molnár 31'; Tököli 86'	Stadium: Üllői úti stadion Attendance: 8,762; Referee: Zoltán Szarka

1 April 2000 24	Nyíregyháza	3 – 0	Ferencváros	Nyíregyháza
16:30 CEST	Lakos 21'; Chernienko 39', 43'	Report		Stadium: Városi Stadion; Attendance: 12,000; Referee: Zsolt Szabó

5 April 2000 25	Ferencváros	2 – 0	Diósgyőr	Budapest
18:00 CEST	Rob 25'; Váczi 62'	Report		Stadium: Üllői úti stadion Attendance: 4,652; Referee: Attila Hajdó

8 April 2000 26	Debrecen	3 – 0	Ferencváros	Debrecen
17:00 CEST	Bagoly 8'; Siklósi 22'; Bajzát 90+3'	Report		Stadium: Oláh Gábor utcai Stadion; Attendance: 5,000; Referee: Attila Juhos

15 April 2000 27	Ferencváros	0 – 0	Újpest	Budapest
17:00 CEST		Report		Stadium: Üllői úti stadion Attendance: 10,612; Referee: Attila Ábrahám

21 April 2000 28	Tatabánya	2 – 1	Ferencváros	Tatabánya
17:00 CEST	Vincze 36'; Hornyák 67'	Report	Horváth 59' (pen.)	Stadium: Városi Stadion; Attendance: 5,000; Referee: Attila Hanacsek

29 April 2000 29	Ferencváros	3 – 0	Nagykanizsa	Budapest
17:00 CEST	Bárányos 13'; Tóth 45', 80'	Report		Stadium: Üllői úti stadion Attendance: 2,500; Referee: Sándor Puhl

6 May 2000 30	Siófok	2 – 4	Ferencváros	Siófok
17:00 CEST	Babos 72'; Földes 73'	Report	Horváth 23' (pen.), 37' (pen.), 78'; Tóth 44'	Stadium: Révész Géza utcai Stadion; Attendance: 4,000; Referee: Ferenc Bede

12 May 2000 31	Győr	2 – 1	Ferencváros	Győr
19:30 CEST	Vayer 43'; Balla 90'	Report	Bárányos 49'	Stadium: ETO Park; Attendance: 8,000; Referee: Zoltán Szarka

17 May 2000 32	Ferencváros	1 – 0	Kispest	Budapest
17:00 CEST	Horváth 34'	Report		Stadium: Üllői úti stadion Attendance: 5,214; Referee: Attila Hajdó

20 May 2000 33	Szeged	–	Ferencváros	Szeged
CEST		[ Report]		Stadium: Felső-Tiszaparti Stadion

27 May 2000 34	Ferencváros	6 – 2	Haladás	Budapest
17:00 CEST	Horváth 17', 50'; Tóth 31'; Kriston 39'; Bárányos 49'; Gajda 90+2'	Report	Bodor 66'; Balassa 79'	Stadium: Üllői úti stadion Attendance: 4,796; Referee: Zsolt Szabó

=== Hungarian Cup ===
13 October 1998 Round of 32	Zalaegerszeg	0 – 1 (a.e.t.)	Ferencváros	Zalaegerszeg
CEST		[ Report]	Kriston 102'	Stadium: ZTE Arena; Attendance: 9,000; Referee: Attila Hanacsek

1 December 1998 Round of 16	Vasas	4 – 1	Ferencváros	Budapest
CET	Kabát 63'; Szili 67'; Sowunmi 71', 80'	Report	Horváth 73'	Stadium: Illovszky Rudolf Stadion; Attendance: 5,000; Referee: Béla Kiss

=== UEFA Cup ===
==== Qualifying round ====
12 August 1999 Q1 Leg 1	Ferencváros	3 – 1	(Moldova) Constructorul Chișinău	Budapest, Hungary
19:00 CEST	Horváth 35'; Füzi 41'; Kovács 73'	Report	Comleonoc 78'	Stadium: Üllői úti stadion Attendance: 5,641; Referee: (Federal Republic of Yugoslavia) Dejan Delević

26 August 1999 Q1 Leg 2	(Andorra) Constructorul Chișinău	1 – 1 (2 – 4 agg.)	Ferencváros	Chișinău, Moldova
16:00 CEST	Zabolotnii 41'	Report	Horváth 38'	Stadium: Stadionul Republican; Attendance: 4,000; Referee: (England) Mike Riley

==== First round ====
16 September 1999 R1 Leg 1	Teplice (Czech Republic)	3 – 1	Ferencváros	Teplice
CEST	Frýdek 33'; Kolomazník 54'; Rízek 71'	Report	Tóth 15'	Stadium: Na Stínadlech; Attendance: 10,000; Referee: (Switzerland) Massimo Busacca

30 September 1999 R1 Leg 2	Ferencváros	1 – 1 (2 – 4 agg.)	(Czech Republic) Teplice	Budapest, Hungary
CEST	Mátyus 57' (pen.)	Report	Rada 53'	Stadium: Üllői úti stadion Attendance: 8,534; Referee: (Poland) Jacek Granat

== Statistics ==
=== Appearances and goals ===
Last updated on 27 May 2000.

No.	Pos	Nat	Player	Total		PNB		Hungarian Cup		UEFA Cup	
No.	Pos	Nat	Player	Apps	Goals	Apps	Goals	Apps	Goals	Apps	Goals
2	DF	(Hungary) HUN	Tibor Baranyai	3	0	2	0	1	0	0	0
3	DF	(Hungary) HUN	Pál Lakos	32	0	26	0	2	0	4	0
4	MF	(Hungary) HUN	Norbert Nagy	34	0	29	0	2	0	3	0
5	DF	(Hungary) HUN	Mihály Szűcs	25	0	20	0	1	0	4	0
6	DF	(Hungary) HUN	Pál Lilik	19	0	17	0	1	0	1	0
7	MF	(Hungary) HUN	Attila Kriston	26	2	20	1	2	1	4	0
8	FW	(Hungary) HUN	Péter Horváth	40	24	34	21	2	1	4	2
9	FW	(Hungary) HUN	Kornél Rob	6	1	6	1	0	0	0	0
10	MF	(Hungary) HUN	Levente Schultz	13	0	12	0	0	0	1	0
11	FW	(Hungary) HUN	Zoltán Fülöp	5	0	4	0	0	0	1	0
11	FW	(Hungary) HUN	Gábor Vén	15	2	15	2	0	0	0	0
12	MF	(Slovakia) SVK	Norbert Csoknay	14	0	14	0	0	0	0	0
13	MF	(Hungary) HUN	Zoltán Váczi	8	2	8	2	0	0	0	0
14	MF	(Hungary) HUN	Ákos Füzi	31	2	26	1	1	0	4	1
15	MF	(Hungary) HUN	Csaba Földvári	9	1	9	1	0	0	0	0
16	MF	(Hungary) HUN	Tibor Halgas	10	0	9	0	1	0	0	0
17	DF	(Federal Republic of Yugoslavia) YUG	Dragan Crnomarković	14	0	14	0	0	0	0	0
18	DF	(Hungary) HUN	Zoltán Jagodics	10	0	8	0	2	0	0	0
19	MF	(Hungary) HUN	Zsolt Bárányos	37	9	31	9	2	0	4	0
20	MF	(Hungary) HUN	Béla Kovács	22	3	16	2	2	0	4	1
21	FW	(Hungary) HUN	Mihály Tóth	36	20	31	19	2	0	3	1
23	FW	(Hungary) HUN	Zoltán Bükszegi	7	0	7	0	0	0	0	0
24	MF	(Hungary) HUN	Balázs Lászka	11	1	10	1	0	0	1	0
25	GK	(Hungary) HUN	Lajos Szűcs	39	-49	33	-39	2	-4	4	-6
26	MF	(Hungary) HUN	Tamás Bócz	4	0	4	0	0	0	0	0
27	DF	(Hungary) HUN	György Sallai	1	0	1	0	0	0	0	0
28	DF	(Hungary) HUN	Gábor Gyepes	2	0	2	0	0	0	0	0
29	FW	(Hungary) HUN	István Gajda	2	1	2	1	0	0	0	0
30	MF	(Hungary) HUN	Tamás Somorjai	1	0	1	0	0	0	0	0
39	DF	(Hungary) HUN	László Csákvári	1	0	1	0	0	0	0	0
Players no longer at the club:
9	FW	(Albania) ALB	Zenun Selimi	1	0	0	0	0	0	1	0
13	MF	(Hungary) HUN	Zoltán Zöld	2	0	1	0	0	0	1	0
17	DF	(Hungary) HUN	János Mátyus	19	2	14	1	1	0	4	1
28	FW	(Hungary) HUN	Sándor Kulcsár	15	1	10	1	1	0	4	0

=== Top scorers ===
Includes all competitive matches. The list is sorted by shirt number when total goals are equal.

Last updated on 27 May 2000.

Position	Nation	Number	Name	PNB	Hungarian Cup	UEFA Cup	Total
1	(Hungary)	8	Péter Horváth	21	1	2	24
2	(Hungary)	21	Mihály Tóth	19	0	1	20
3	(Hungary)	19	Zsolt Bárányos	9	0	0	9
4	(Hungary)	20	Béla Kovács	2	0	1	3
5	(Hungary)	17	János Mátyus	1	0	1	2
6	(Hungary)	14	Ákos Füzi	1	0	1	2
7	(Hungary)	11	Gábor Vén	2	0	0	2
8	(Hungary)	13	Zoltán Váczi	2	0	0	2
9	(Hungary)	7	Attila Kriston	1	1	0	2
10	(Hungary)	24	Balázs Lászka	1	0	0	1
11	(Hungary)	28	Sándor Kulcsár	1	0	0	1
12	(Hungary)	15	Csaba Földvári	1	0	0	1
13	(Hungary)	9	Kornél Rob	1	0	0	1
14	(Hungary)	29	István Gajda	1	0	0	1
/	/	/	Own Goals	2	0	0	2
			TOTALS	65	2	6	73

=== Disciplinary record ===
Includes all competitive matches. Players with 1 card or more included only.

Last updated on 27 May 2000.

Position	Nation	Number	Name	PNB		Hungarian Cup		UEFA Cup		Total (Hu Total)	
Position	Nation	Number	Name	Booked	Sent off (straight red)	Booked	Sent off (straight red)	Booked	Sent off (straight red)	Booked	Sent off (straight red)
GK	(Hungary)	1	Lajos Szűcs	1	0	0	0	0	0	1 (1)	0 (0)
DF	(Hungary)	3	Pál Lakos	8	0	0	0	1	0	9 (8)	0 (0)
MF	(Hungary)	4	Norbert Nagy	6	0	1	0	0	0	7 (6)	0 (0)
DF	(Hungary)	5	Mihály Szűcs	5	1	1	0	0	0	6 (5)	1 (1)
DF	(Hungary)	6	Pál Lilik	1	0	1	0	1	0	3 (1)	0 (0)
MF	(Hungary)	7	Attila Kriston	6	1	1	0	2	0	9 (6)	1 (1)
FW	(Hungary)	8	Péter Horváth	2	0	0	0	0	0	2 (2)	0 (0)
FW	(Hungary)	11	Zoltán Fülöp	1	0	0	0	0	0	1 (1)	0 (0)
MF	(Slovakia)	12	Norbert Csoknay	6	0	0	0	0	0	6 (6)	0 (0)
MF	(Hungary)	13	Zoltán Váczi	4	0	0	0	0	0	4 (4)	0 (0)
MF	(Hungary)	14	Ákos Füzi	4	0	0	0	2	0	6 (4)	0 (0)
MF	(Hungary)	15	Csaba Földvári	4	1	0	0	0	0	4 (4)	1 (1)
MF	(Hungary)	16	Tibor Halgas	0	0	1	0	0	0	1 (0)	0 (0)
DF	(Hungary)	17	János Mátyus	1	1	0	1	1	0	2 (1)	2 (1)
DF	(Federal Republic of Yugoslavia)	17	Dragan Crnomarković	3	0	0	0	0	0	3 (3)	0 (0)
DF	(Hungary)	18	Zoltán Jagodics	1	0	0	0	0	0	1 (1)	0 (0)
MF	(Hungary)	19	Zsolt Bárányos	5	0	1	0	1	0	7 (5)	0 (0)
MF	(Hungary)	20	Béla Kovács	0	0	0	0	1	0	1 (0)	0 (0)
FW	(Hungary)	21	Mihály Tóth	2	1	0	0	1	0	3 (2)	1 (1)
MF	(Hungary)	24	Balázs Lászka	1	0	0	0	1	0	2 (1)	0 (0)
GK	(Hungary)	25	Lajos Szűcs	1	0	0	0	0	0	1 (1)	0 (0)
MF	(Hungary)	26	Tamás Bócz	1	0	0	0	0	0	1 (1)	0 (0)
			TOTALS	63	5	6	1	11	0	80 (63)	6 (5)

=== Overall ===
Games played	38 (33 PNB, 2 Hungarian Cup and 4 UEFA Cup)
Games won	17 (15 PNB, 1 Hungarian Cup and 1 UEFA Cup)
Games drawn	10 (8 PNB, 0 Hungarian Cup and 2 UEFA Cup)
Games lost	12 (10 PNB, 1 Hungarian Cup and 1 UEFA Cup)
Goals scored	73
Goals conceded	49
Goal difference	+25
Yellow cards	80
Red cards	5
Worst discipline	(Hungary) Attila Kriston (9 (yellow card) , 1 (red card) )
Best result	8–0 (H) v Vác - (PNB) - 11–3–2000
Worst result	1–4 (A) v Vasas - (Hungarian Cup) - 1–12–1999
Worst result	0–3 (A) v Nyíregyháza - (PNB) - 1–4–2000
Most appearances	(Hungary) Péter Horváth (39 appearances)
Most appearances	(Hungary) Lajos Szűcs (39 appearances)
Top scorer	(Hungary) Péter Horváth (24 goals)
Points	61/117 (52.13%)

Last updated: 27 May 2000
