= 2014–15 Rákospalotai EAC season =

Rákospalota
2014–15 season
- Chief executives: Tamás Forgács; Ferenc Sági
- Manager: József Dzurják
- Stadium: Budai II. László Stadion
- Nemzeti Bajnokság III (Central): 3rd
- Magyar Kupa: Round of 64
- Top goalscorer: League: Richárd Csiszár (9); All: Richárd Csiszár (11)
2014 colours	2015 colours

The 2014–15 season was Rákospalotai Egyetértés Atlétikai Club's or shortly REAC's 68th competitive season, 3rd consecutive season in the Nemzeti Bajnokság III and 102nd year in existence as a football club. In addition to the domestic league, Rákospalota participated in this season's editions of the Magyar Kupa.

János Mátyus left REAC in 2014 after four years as head coach. His place was taken by József Dzurják, who worked before as a professional advisor for the Ferencváros Futsal team.

== First team squad ==
The players listed had league appearances and stayed until the end of the season.

Note: Flags indicate national team as defined under FIFA eligibility rules; some limited exceptions apply. Players may hold more than one non-FIFA nationality.

No.	Pos.	Nation	Player
1	GK	(Ukraine) UKR	Vladyslav Chanhelia
2	DF	(Hungary) HUN	Balázs Dinka
3	MF	(Hungary) HUN	Balázs Olay
4	DF	(Hungary) HUN	Ádám Baranyai
5	DF	(Hungary) HUN	Bálint Balázs
6	MF	(Hungary) HUN	Balázs Lászka
7	FW	(Hungary) HUN	Máté Fézler
8	MF	(Serbia) SRB	Nemanja Perendić
9	N/A	(Hungary) HUN	Sándor Krasznay
9	MF	(Hungary) HUN	Imre Nagy
10	MF	(Hungary) HUN	Tamás Kiss
11	FW	(Hungary) HUN	Richárd Csiszár
12	FW	(Hungary) HUN	Kristóf Csete

No.	Pos.	Nation	Player
12	MF	(Hungary) HUN	Zsolt Pálmai
13	MF	(Hungary) HUN	Gábor Borsos
13	DF	(Hungary) HUN	László Emperger
13	N/A	(Hungary) HUN	Tamás Grót
14	DF	(Hungary) HUN	Zsolt Kollár
15	MF	(Hungary) HUN	Erik Pfister
16	DF	(Hungary) HUN	Bálint Szlezák
17	N/A	(Hungary) HUN	Benjámin Kollár
17	MF	(Hungary) HUN	Viktor Lucz
18	N/A	(Hungary) HUN	Dávid Mándoki
18	FW	(Hungary) HUN	Pantelis Popgeorgiev
19	DF	(Hungary) HUN	Dávid Labát
20	GK	(Hungary) HUN	Gyula Kőhalmi

== Transfers ==
=== Transfers in ===
Date	Pos.	No.	Player	From	Ref
4 August 2014	MF	8	(Serbia) Nemanja Perendić	Hajdúböszörmény	
5 August 2014	DF	5	(Hungary) Bálint Balázs	Felsőtárkány	
5 August 2014	DF	19	(Hungary) Dávid Labát	Komló	
5 August 2014	MF	6	(Hungary) Balázs Lászka	Budaörs	
5 August 2014	MF	9	(Hungary) Imre Nagy	Ebes	
5 August 2014	MF	3	(Hungary) Balázs Olay	Veresegyház	
29 August 2014	FW	7	(Hungary) Máté Fézler	Diósgyőr	
30 September 2014	FW	18	(Hungary) Pantelis Popgeorgiev	Ferencváros	
24 February 2015	DF	4	(Hungary) Ádám Baranyai	Siófok	
24 February 2015	DF	16	(Hungary) Bálint Szlezák	Salgótarján	

=== Transfers out ===
Date	Pos.	No.	Player	To	Ref
21 July 2014	N/A	20	(Hungary) Attila Gyurkovics	Voyage	
31 July 2014	FW	11	(Hungary) János Olasz	Salgótarján	
31 July 2014	MF	8	(Hungary) Dávid Szekér	Cegléd	
1 August 2014	MF	16	(Hungary) Ákos Füle	Cegléd	
5 August 2014	DF	3	(Hungary) Attila Honti	Rákosmente	
5 August 2014	MF	9	(Hungary) Dániel Kovács	Honvéd	
5 August 2014	N/A	7	(Hungary) Ferenc Porkoláb	Voyage	
14 August 2014	FW	14	(Hungary) Richárd Wágner	Rákosmente	
17 August 2014	FW	4	(Hungary) Dániel Lukács	Honvéd II	
21 August 2014	GK	1	(Hungary) Dominik Csurgai	Csepel	
28 August 2014	N/A	12	(Hungary) Bence Csiszár	PEAC	
29 August 2014	MF	9	(Hungary) Nabil Switzer	Gödöllő	
1 September 2014	DF	15	(Hungary) Dávid Radványi	Békéscsaba	
23 February 2015	DF	13	(Hungary) János Birtalan	BKV Előre	
23 February 2015	FW	8	(Hungary) Patrik Czimmermann	Vecsés	
25 February 2014	FW	7	(Hungary) Tamás Herbály	Veresegyház	

=== Loans in ===
Start date	End date	Pos.	No.	Player	From	Ref

=== Loans out ===
Start date	End date	Pos.	No.	Player	To	Ref
2 February 2015	End of season	N/A	18	(Hungary) Márk Aranyás	Csomád	

== Competitions ==
=== Overview ===
Competition	First match	Last match	Starting round	Final position	Record							
Competition	First match	Last match	Starting round	Final position	Pld	W	D	L	GF	GA	GD	Win %
Nemzeti Bajnokság III	16 August 2014	7 June 2015	Matchday 1	3rd	30	14	9	7	55	45	+10	46.67
Magyar Kupa	10 August 2014	10 September 2014	Round of 128	Round of 64	2	1	0	1	2	4	−2	50.00
Total					32	15	9	8	57	49	+8	46.88

Source: Competitions

=== Nemzeti Bajnokság III ===
==== League table ====
Pos	Team	Pld	W	D	L	GF	GA	GD	Pts	Promotion or relegation
1	Vác (C, P)	30	19	6	5	70	29	+41	63	Promotion to Nemzeti Bajnokság II
2	Kozármisleny	30	18	7	5	76	26	+50	61	
3	Rákospalota	30	14	9	7	55	45	+10	51	
4	Videoton II	30	15	5	10	53	34	+19	50	
5	SZEOL	30	15	4	11	43	34	+9	49	

Source: HFF
Rules for classification: 1) Points; 2) Matches won; 3) Goal difference; 4) Goals scored; 5) Head-to-head points; 6) Head-to-head goal difference; 7) Head-to-head away goals scored; 8) Fair play ranking; 9) Drawing of lots.
(C) Champions; (P) Promoted

==== Results summary ====
Overall								Home						Away					
Pld	W	D	L	GF	GA	GD	Pts	W	D	L	GF	GA	GD	W	D	L	GF	GA	GD
30	14	9	7	55	45	+10	51	10	2	3	31	19	+12	4	7	4	24	26	−2

Source: HFF

==== Results by round ====
Round	1	2	3	4	5	6	7	8	9	10	11	12	13	14	15	16	17	18	19	20	21	22	23	24	25	26	27	28	29	30
Ground	H	A	H	A	H	A	H	A	H	H	A	H	A	H	A	A	H	A	H	A	H	A	H	A	A	H	A	H	A	H
Result	W	W	W	D	L	D	L	W	D	W	D	D	D	L	D	D	W	W	W	L	W	L	W	L	D	W	W	W	L	W
Position	5	2	1	2	4	3	7	4	6	2	4	5	6	7	8	9	6	4	3	4	4	6	4	5	5	4	4	3	5	3
Points	3	6	9	10	10	11	11	14	15	18	19	20	21	21	22	23	26	29	32	32	35	35	38	38	39	42	45	48	48	51

Source: Matches
A = Away; H = Home; W = Win; D = Draw; L = Loss

==== Score overview ====
Opposition	Home score	Away score	Aggregate score	Double
Baja	2–2	4–2	6–2	No
Bölcske	1–2	1–6	2–8	No
Dabas	3–0	1–1	4–1	No
Dunaharaszti	2–1	2–2	4–3	No
ESMTK	4–1	0–0	4–1	No
Gyula	3–0	1–1	4–1	No
Kozármisleny	1–1	1–4	2–5	No
Maglód	1–0	4–0	5–0	Yes
Monor	4–2	1–1	5–3	No
Orosháza	3–2	4–0	7–2	Yes
Szekszárd	3–2	1–1	4–3	No
Szentlőrinc	1–0	1–0	2–0	Yes
SZEOL	1–3	0–1	1–4	No
Vác	0–3	1–5	1–8	No
Videoton II	2–0	2–2	4–2	No

==== Matches ====
16 August 2014 1	Rákospalota	4–2	Monor	Budapest
19:00 CEST (UTC+2)	D. Labát 25', (yellow card) 45'; Z. Kollár (yellow card) 64'; T. Kiss 69'; T. Herbály 80'; B. Kollár 89'	Report	Z. Háda 50'; V. Szabó 61'; G. Villányi (yellow card) 66'; T. Petrezselyem (red card) 74'; Mészáros (yellow card) 90'	Stadium: Budai II. László Stadion; Referee: Gábor Péter Kovács

23 August 2014 2	Maglód	0–4	Rákospalota	Maglód
17:30 CEST (UTC+2)	M. Horváth (yellow card) 60'; P. Molnár (yellow card) 81'	Report	D. Labát (yellow card) 39', (goal) 47'; B. Balázs (yellow card) 49'; R. Csiszár 61'; J. Birtalan (yellow card) 65'; B. Kollár 67'; K. Csete 76'; Z. Kollár (yellow card) 90'	Stadium: Kertész Károly Stadion; Attendance: 150; Referee: Tamás Móri

30 August 2014 3	Rákospalota	3–2	Orosháza	Budapest
19:00 CEST (UTC+2)	Lászka (yellow card) 49'; T. Kiss 59'; T. Herbály 75'; Z. Kollár 89'	Report	T. Fülöp (yellow card) 40'; G. Huszár 45'; A. Végh 53'; N. Juhász (yellow card) 55'; M. Ferenczi (yellow card) 81'; D. Bozsóki (yellow card) 87'	Stadium: Budai II. László Stadion; Attendance: 150; Referee: Gábor Kátai

6 September 2014 4	Dunaharaszti	2–2	Rákospalota	Dunaharaszti
16:30 CEST (UTC+2)	Á. Rétsági (yellow card) 4'; M. Nyéki (yellow card) 17'; G. Ablonczy (yellow card) 25'; M. Miholics 28'; K. Dabasi 65'; N. Gacsal (red card) 80'	Report	K. Csete 1', (yellow card) 68'; T. Kiss 5', (yellow card) 55'; D. Labát (red card) 36'; Z. Kollár (yellow card) 60'	Stadium: MTK Sporttelep; Referee: Gyöngyi Gaál

13 September 2014 5	Rákospalota	1–3	SZEOL	Budapest
16:30 CEST (UTC+2)	B. Balázs 70'	Report	P. Beretka 11'; P. Buzási (yellow card) 39'; C. Bata 42', (yellow card) 75'; B. Faragó (yellow card) 61'; T. Ondrejó 90+1'	Stadium: Budai II. László Stadion; Attendance: 150; Referee: Ádám Pillók

21 September 2014 6	ESMTK	0–0	Rákospalota	Budapest
16:00 CEST (UTC+2)	S. Müllerlei (yellow card) 14'; G. Szabó (yellow card) 82'	Report	D. Labát (yellow card) 19'; B. Balázs (red card) 82'	Stadium: ESMTK Stadion; Attendance: 300; Referee: Tibor II Gyarmati

27 September 2014 7	Rákospalota	0–3	Vác	Budapest
16:00 CEST (UTC+2)	E. Pfister (yellow card) 30'; I. Nagy (yellow card) 58'; Z. Kollár (yellow card) 66'; T. Kiss (yellow card) 68'	Report	Gulyás (yellow card) 6'; G. Tányéros (yellow card) 38'; Zsolnai 47'; Rása (yellow card) 64'; G. Németh (yellow card) 65'; P. Pölöskei II 71'; G. Kovács 76'	Stadium: Budai II. László Stadion; Attendance: 500; Referee: Tamás Berényi

5 October 2014 8	Szentlőrinc	0–1	Rákospalota	Szentlőrinc
15:00 CEST (UTC+2)	P. Leipold (yellow card) 31'; G. Berkics (yellow card) 74'; T. Turi (yellow card) 75'; Z. Vadas (yellow card) 79'	Report	I. Nagy (yellow card) 64'; K. Csete (red card) 84'; V. Lucz 87'; P. Czimmermann (yellow card) 90'	Stadium: Szentlőrinc SE Sporttelep; Referee: Dávid Lapath

12 October 2014 9	Rákospalota	1–1	Kozármisleny	Budapest
16:00 CEST (UTC+2)	D. Labát (yellow card) 42'; J. Birtalan (red card) 45'; P. Czimmermann (yellow card) 45'; V. Lucz 55'	Report	S. Erdős (red card) 18'; N. Lauer 45'; Z. Puskás (yellow card) 68'; O. Fenyvesi (yellow card) 90'	Stadium: Budai II. László Stadion; Referee: Gábor Péter Kovács

18 October 2014 10	Rákospalota	2–0	Videoton II	Budapest
16:30 CEST (UTC+2)	E. Pfister (yellow card) 2'; Kocsis 3' (o.g.); D. Labát 30'	Report	B. Király (yellow card) 20'; D. Baksa (yellow card) 82'	Stadium: Budai II. László Stadion; Attendance: 200; Referee: Miklós Tuczai

26 October 2014 11	Dabas	1–1	Rákospalota	Dabas
13:30 CEST (UTC+2)	Á. Zsíros (yellow card) 38'; K. Takács 63', (yellow card) 70'; G. Lanczkor (yellow card) 90'	Report	T. Kiss (yellow card) 28'; P. Popgeorgiev (yellow card) 35'; D. Labát (yellow card) 57'; B. Balázs (yellow card) 73'; V. Lucz 75', (yellow card) 90+2'; I. Nagy (yellow card) 77'	Stadium: Wellis Sportpark; Referee: Gábor Kátai

1 November 2014 12	Rákospalota	2–2	Baja	Budapest
16:30 CEST (UTC+2)	B. Balázs (yellow card) 45'; V. Lucz 66', (yellow card) 68'; Lászka (yellow card) 79'; Z. Kollár 83'	Report	D. Sibinger 4', 35'; M. Tóth (yellow card) 39'; C. Orsós (yellow card) 66'; Z. Harnos (yellow card) 90+2'	Stadium: Budai II. László Stadion; Referee: Ádám Pillók

8 November 2014 13	Szekszárd	1–1	Rákospalota	Szekszárd
13:30 CEST (UTC+2)	E. Márton (yellow card) 25'; D. Hernády (yellow card) 27', (goal) 71'; D. Vuckovic (yellow card) 31'; Rátkai (yellow card) 50'	Report	D. Labát (yellow card) 63'; P. Czimmermann 79'	Stadium: Városi Sport és Szabadidőközpont; Referee: Gábor Péter Kovács

15 November 2014 14	Rákospalota	1–2	Bölcske	Budapest
16:30 CEST (UTC+2)	V. Chanhelia (yellow card) 25'; Z. Kollár 45', (yellow card) 77'	Report	T. Tóth 25', (yellow card) 78'; I. Szili (yellow card) 42'; J. Tóth (yellow card) 45'; G. Hajdók (yellow card) 53'; R. Miskovicz 61'; R. Fröhlich (yellow card) 69'	Stadium: Budai II. László Stadion; Referee: Gábor Kátai

22 November 2014 15	Gyula	1–1	Rákospalota	Gyula
13:00 CEST (UTC+2)	Á. Laurinyecz 50'; Belényesi (yellow card) 55'; I. Barna (yellow card) 75'	Report	N. Perendić 27'; E. Pfister (yellow card) 65'	Stadium: id. Christián László Városi Sporttelep; Referee: Sándor Szilágyi

28 February 2015 16	Monor	1–1	Rákospalota	Monor
14:00 CEST (UTC+2)	G. Villányi (yellow card) 9'; I. Csőke (yellow card) 21'; Z. Háda (yellow card) 45'; Á. Tóth (yellow card) 65'; D. Horváth 70'	Report	P. Popgeorgiev (yellow card) 15'; D. Labát (yellow card) 28'; B. Balázs (red card) 44'; R. Csiszár 57'; Baranyai (yellow card) 83'	Stadium: Balassi Bálint utcai Stadion; Referee: Attila Szommer

7 March 2015 17	Rákospalota	1–0	Maglód	Budapest
18:00 CEST (UTC+2)	E. Pfister (yellow card) 32'; Baranyai (yellow card) 50'; R. Csiszár 84'; Z. Pálmai (yellow card) 90'	Report	K. Csendom (yellow card) 57'; B. Bátori (yellow card) 60'; M. Matyó (yellow card) 61'; M. Horváth (yellow card) 63'; Szirtesi (yellow card) 80'	Stadium: Budai II. László Stadion; Attendance: 200; Referee: Gergő Bogár

14 March 2015 18	Orosháza	0–4	Rákospalota	Orosháza
14:30 CEST (UTC+2)	N. Juhász (yellow card) 3'; K. Kránitz (yellow card) 7'; D. Bordás (red card) 69'	Report	Z. Kollár 8' (pen.), 26' (pen.); N. Perendić 21'; E. Pfister (yellow card) 59'; B. Olay 84'	Stadium: Mátrai- Stadion; Attendance: 150; Referee: Zoltán Brezovai

21 March 2015 19	Rákospalota	2–1	Dunaharaszti	Budapest
18:00 CEST (UTC+2)	P. Popgeorgiev 15', (yellow card) 69'; Z. Kollár (yellow card) 23', (goal) 48'; R. Csiszár (yellow card) 66'	Report	G. Ablonczy (yellow card) 49', (goal) 55'; D. Márton (red card) 76'	Stadium: Budai II. László Stadion; Referee: László Szalai

28 March 2015 20	SZEOL	1–0	Rákospalota	Szeged
15:00 CEST (UTC+2)	P. Beretka 72'; A. Végh (yellow card) 90'	Report	Lászka (yellow card) 63'	Stadium: Felső Tisza-parti stadion Attendance: 250; Referee: Péter Zierkelbach

4 April 2015 21	Rákospalota	4–1	ESMTK	Budapest
14:30 CEST (UTC+2)	B. Balázs 15'; R. Csiszár 71'; T. Kiss 75'; D. Labát (yellow card) 78'; N. Perendić 85'	Report	B. Murinai 33'; D. Kiss (yellow card) 45'; D. Túri (yellow card) 63'	Stadium: Budai II. László Stadion; Referee: Miklós Bereczki

11 April 2015 22	Vác	5–1	Rákospalota	Vác
16:30 CEST (UTC+2)	Magos 15'; A. Szeleczki (yellow card) 33'; Rása (yellow card) 35'; Farkas (yellow card) 44'; Rusvay 51'; G. Tányéros 56'; G. Tóth 69'; P. Pölöskei II 90'	Report	Lászka (yellow card) 25'; D. Labát (red card) 50'; L. Emperger (yellow card) 72'; R. Csiszár 80'	Stadium: Ligeti Stadion; Referee: Dr Géza Jakab

18 April 2015 23	Rákospalota	1–0	Szentlőrinc	Budapest
17:00 CEST (UTC+2)	Lászka (yellow card) 17'; B. Szlezák (yellow card) 21'; E. Pfister (yellow card) 28'; P. Popgeorgiev 40'; Z. Pálmai (yellow card) 90+3'	Report	A. Tóth (yellow card) 20'; Á. Tóth (yellow card) 38'; Kalmár (yellow card) 54'	Stadium: Budai II. László Stadion; Referee: Tibor Farkas

25 April 2015 24	Kozármisleny	4–1	Rákospalota	Kozármisleny
17:00 CEST (UTC+2)	Beke; M. Nagy; Z. Schmidt; A. Tóth; E. Nagy (yellow card) 24'; T. Kovács (yellow card) 65'	Report	T. Kiss; Z. Kollár (yellow card) 37'; N. Perendić (yellow card) 58'; I. Nagy (yellow card) 59'	Stadium: Kozármislenyi Stadion; Referee: István Mód

3 May 2015 25	Videoton II	2–2	Rákospalota	Székesfehérvár
17:30 CEST (UTC+2)	J. Gyánó (yellow card) 13'; Géresi 24'; D. Havasi 40'; B. Bognár (yellow card) 70'; R. Cseszneki (yellow card) 81'; D. Kiprich (red card) 87'	Report	I. Nagy 13'; N. Perendić (yellow card) 33'; Lászka (yellow card) 35'; T. Kiss 73'; Z. Kollár (yellow card) 80'; M. Fézler (yellow card) 84'	Stadium: Sóstói Stadion; Attendance: 150; Referee: Miklós Tuczai

9 May 2015 26	Rákospalota	3–0	Dabas	Budapest
17:30 CEST (UTC+2)	Z. Pálmai 29'; G. Borsos (yellow card) 50'; T. Kiss (yellow card) 66'; R. Csiszár (yellow card) 69'; Lászka 79'; I. Nagy 88'	Report	K. Takács (yellow card) 62'; Á. Zsíros (yellow card) 66'; C. Dévai (yellow card) 68'	Stadium: Budai II. László Stadion; Referee: Gábor Péter Kovács

16 May 2015 27	Baja	2–4	Rákospalota	Baja
18:00 CEST (UTC+2)	Z. Szádeczky 35'; M. Balogh (yellow card) 41'; L. István (yellow card) 50'; D. Illés 55', (yellow card) 56'; R. Pintér (yellow card) 57'; P. Hosszú (yellow card) 85'	Report	R. Csiszár 2'; N. Perendić 23'; Z. Kollár 52', 54'; Lászka (yellow card) 69'	Stadium: Városi Sporttelep; Referee: Katalin Sipos

23 May 2015 28	Rákospalota	3–2	Szekszárd	Budapest
18:00 CEST (UTC+2)	R. Csiszár 8', (yellow card) 90+2'; I. Nagy 11', (yellow card) 82'; B. Balázs (yellow card) 56'; Z. Pálmai 63'	Report	Zsók (yellow card) 60'; D. Deli (yellow card) 61', (goal) 77'; Á. Arena (yellow card) 66'; B. Dobra 85'; G. Rátkai (yellow card) 90+2'	Stadium: Budai II. László Stadion; Referee: Gergő Bogár

30 May 2015 29	Bölcske	6–1	Rákospalota	Bölcske
18:00 CEST (UTC+2)	I. Szili 5', 39'; D. Budai 30', (red card) 62'; R. Fröhlich (yellow card) 51'; T. Tóth 71'; B. Laták 74'; G. Agócs 90'	Report	R. Csiszár (yellow card) 35'; M. Fézler 48', (yellow card) 49'; Z. Kollár (yellow card) 62'; Lászka (yellow card) 89'	Stadium: Bölcskei SE Sporttelep; Referee: Ádám Pillók

7 June 2015 30	Rákospalota	3–0	Gyula	Budapest
18:00 CEST (UTC+2)	I. Nagy 15'; Z. Kollár (yellow card) 21'; Baranyai (yellow card) 29'; Lászka (yellow card) 51'; R. Csiszár 61', 79'; E. Pfister (yellow card) 67'	Report	Szélpál (yellow card) 38'; D. Burai (yellow card) 45'; T. Kovács (yellow card) 54'; Pászka (yellow card) 67'; K. Sipos (yellow card) 74'	Stadium: Budai II. László Stadion; Referee: Márió Görög

=== Magyar Kupa ===
10 August 2014 Round of 128	Kótaj	0–1	Rákospalota	Kótaj
17:00 CEST (UTC+2)	S. Lucskai (yellow card) 31'; J. Gnonsoakla (yellow card) 76'; I. Takács (yellow card) 87'; L. Guszti (yellow card) 89'	Report	I. Nagy (yellow card) 45'; R. Csiszár 53'; K. Csete (yellow card) 65'; T. Herbály (yellow card) 80'	Stadium: Kótaj Sportpálya; Attendance: 400; Referee: Gábor Kátai

10 September 2014 Round of 64	Kazincbarcika	4–1	Rákospalota	Kazincbarcika
15:30 CEST (UTC+2)	Sárközi 6'; M. Nehéz 10', 43', 57'; P. Kovács (yellow card) 78'	Report	I. Nagy (yellow card) 8'; R. Csiszár 72'; Z. Kollár (yellow card) 76'; T. Herbály (yellow card) 83'	Stadium: Pete András Stadion; Referee: Roland Veizer

== Statistics ==
=== Overall ===
Appearances (Apps) numbers are for appearances in competitive games only, including sub appearances.
Source: Competitions

No.	Player	Pos.	Nemzeti Bajnokság III				Magyar Kupa				Total			
No.	Player	Pos.	Apps	Goal	Booked	Sent off (straight red)	Apps	Goal	Booked	Sent off (straight red)	Apps	Goal	Booked	Sent off (straight red)
1	(Ukraine) Vladyslav Chanhelia	GK	24		1		1				25		1	
2	(Hungary) Balázs Dinka	DF	8								8			
3	(Hungary) Balázs Olay	MF	21	1			2				23	1		
4	(Hungary) Ádám Baranyai	DF	9		3						9		3	
5	(Hungary) Bálint Balázs	DF	26	2	4	2	2				28	2	4	2
6	(Hungary) Balázs Lászka	MF	25	1	9		2				27	1	9	
7	(Hungary) Máté Fézler	FW	15	1	2						15	1	2	
7	(Hungary) Tamás Herbály	FW	9	2			2		2		9	2	2	
8	(Hungary) Patrik Czimmermann	FW	6	1	2						6	1	2	
8	(Serbia) Nemanja Perendić	MF	20	4	2						20	4	2	
9	(Hungary) Sándor Krasznay		2								2			
9	(Hungary) Imre Nagy	MF	28	4	5		2		2		30	4	7	
10	(Hungary) Tamás Kiss	MF	23	6	4		2				25	6	4	
11	(Hungary) Richárd Csiszár	FW	26	9	4		2	2			28	11	4	
12	(Hungary) Kristóf Csete	FW	13	2	1	1	2		1		15	2	2	1
12	(Hungary) Zsolt Pálmai	MF	12	2	2						12	2	2	
13	(Hungary) János Birtalan	DF	13		1	1	2				15		1	1
13	(Hungary) Gábor Borsos	MF	8		1						8		1	
13	(Hungary) László Emperger	DF	3		1						3		1	
13	(Hungary) Tamás Grót		2								2			
14	(Hungary) Zsolt Kollár	DF	29	8	10		2		1		31	8	11	
15	(Hungary) Erik Pfister	MF	21		7		2				23		7	
16	(Hungary) Bálint Szlezák	DF	10		1						10		1	
17	(Hungary) Benjámin Kollár		3	2			1				4	2		
17	(Hungary) Viktor Lucz	MF	21	4	2		1				22	4	2	
18	(Hungary) Márk Aranyás													
18	(Hungary) Dávid Mándoki		1								1			
18	(Hungary) Pantelis Popgeorgiev	FW	12	2	3						12	2	3	
19	(Hungary) Dávid Labát	DF	22	3	8	2	2				24	3	8	2
20	(Hungary) Gyula Kőhalmi	GK	6				1				7			
22	(Hungary) Máté Kléner													
Own goals				1										
Totals				55	73	6		2	6			57	79	6

=== Clean sheets ===
			Clean sheets		
No.	Player	Games Played	Nemzeti Bajnokság III	Magyar Kupa	Total
1	(Ukraine) Vladyslav Chanhelia	25	7	1	8
20	(Hungary) Gyula Kőhalmi	7	2	0	2
Totals			9	1	10
