= Zöld =

Zöld is a Hungarian surname literally meaning "green". Notable people with the surname include:

- Sándor Zöld (1913–1951), Hungarian politician
- Zoltán Zöld (born 1979), Hungarian footballer
