= Kovrig =

Kovrig is a surname. Notable people with the surname include:

- Ákos Kovrig (born 1982), Hungarian footballer
- Michael Kovrig, Canadian diplomat
