= Bojan Spasojević =

Bojan Spasojević may refer to:

- Bojan Spasojević (footballer, born 1980), Serbian association football forward
- Bojan Spasojević (footballer, born 1992), Serbian association football forward
