= 1989–90 Nemzeti Bajnokság I =

Nemzeti Bajnokság I
- Season: 1989–90
- Champions: Újpesti Dózsa
- Relegated: Haladás; Csepel
- European Cup: Újpesti Dózsa
- UEFA Cup: MTK-VM; Ferencváros
- Cup Winners' Cup: Pécs
- Matches: 240
- Goals: 520 (2.17 per match)
- Top goalscorer: József Dzurják (18)

Final standings of the Hungarian League 1989–90 season

== Overview ==
The tournament was contested by 16 teams, and Újpest won their 19th leaguetitle at the end of the season, with the guidance of coach István Varga.

Újpest and MTK were embroiled in a dramatic 2-way title-race for the entirety of the season, being tied on points from Matchday 10 until Matchday 20. On Matchday 20 MTK defeated Újpest 2–0 on home soil, with two late goals from Balogh and Cservenkai, in what looked to be the titledecider game. MTK held on to their lead over Újpest (who went on a 6-game winless run) up until the last gameweek of the season.

Despite going on a 3-week losing streak, the second of which was MTK's first and only home defeat of the season, against Veszprém, the team from the 8th district were 3 points clear off of UTE going into the last day of the season. MTK fell to a 2–1 defeat against Vác, while Újpest overcame rivals, and defending champions Kispest to claim the national championship.

== Final standings ==
Pos	Team	Pld	W	D	L	GF	GA	GD	Pts	Qualification or relegation
1	Újpesti Dózsa (C)	30	18	4	8	43	20	+23	58	Qualification for European Cup first round
2	MTK-VM	30	18	4	8	48	26	+22	58	Qualification for UEFA Cup first round
3	Ferencváros	30	13	9	8	48	34	+14	48	Qualification for UEFA Cup first round
4	Pécs	30	13	9	8	37	23	+14	48	Qualification for Cup Winners' Cup first round
5	Tatabányai Bányász	30	13	4	13	24	28	−4	43	
6	Veszprém	30	10	11	9	27	24	+3	41	
7	Siófoki Bányász	30	10	9	11	31	34	−3	39	
8	Vasas	30	10	9	11	35	42	−7	39	
9	Videoton	30	9	11	10	26	30	−4	38	
10	Békéscsaba	30	10	8	12	26	34	−8	38	
11	Váci Izzó	30	8	12	10	30	31	−1	36	
12	Győr	30	7	14	9	34	30	+4	35	
13	Budapest Honvéd (O)	30	9	8	13	31	39	−8	35	Qualification for relegation play-offs
14	Debreceni MVSC (O)	30	7	14	9	20	30	−10	35	Qualification for relegation play-offs
15	Haladás (R)	30	9	6	15	33	46	−13	33	Relegation to Nemzeti Bajnokság II
16	Csepel (R)	30	5	10	15	27	49	−22	25	Relegation to Nemzeti Bajnokság II

Source: rsssf.com
(C) Champions; (O) Play-off winners; (R) Relegated

== Results ==
Home \ Away	BÉK	CSE	DEB	FTC	GYŐ	HAL	HON	MTK	PÉC	SIÓ	TAT	ÚJP	VAS	VÁC	VES	VID
Békéscsaba		1–1	1–1	3–0	1–1	2–1	3–2	0–3	1–0	1–0	0–2	1–4	4–1	0–0	0–1	1–0
Csepel	2–0		0–1	3–3	1–1	3–2	0–0	2–4	0–0	2–1	5–1	1–3	0–5	0–2	0–0	1–1
Debreceni MVSC	0–0	3–1		0–0	1–1	0–0	2–1	2–1	1–0	1–0	0–0	0–0	1–1	0–0	1–0	2–2
Ferencváros	2–0	5–1	3–1		1–1	3–1	1–1	4–0	3–0	4–0	0–1	2–0	3–3	1–0	4–1	0–0
Győr	2–0	3–1	1–1	2–2		2–0	2–0	3–1	0–1	1–1	3–0	0–1	0–1	1–1	2–1	1–1
Haladás	0–1	2–0	0–0	4–0	4–2		0–3	1–2	1–2	1–0	1–0	1–0	2–0	1–1	1–1	1–0
Budapest Honvéd	1–2	2–1	1–1	0–2	2–1	2–1		1–2	1–1	2–1	0–0	0–1	2–0	1–0	0–2	2–2
MTK-VM	1–1	2–0	2–0	3–0	1–0	5–1	3–0		1–0	2–0	2–1	2–0	3–0	1–0	1–2	2–0
Pécs	1–1	2–0	1–0	3–1	2–2	4–1	0–1	0–0		1–1	1–0	4–0	0–0	3–0	1–0	4–0
Siófoki Bányász	1–0	0–0	4–0	1–0	1–0	1–1	2–0	1–1	2–2		1–3	1–0	1–2	3–2	2–0	1–1
Tatabányai Bányász	1–0	1–0	1–0	1–2	0–0	2–1	0–1	1–0	2–0	1–0		1–3	1–2	2–1	0–0	1–0
Újpesti Dózsa	2–0	3–0	2–0	0–0	1–0	3–0	2–0	2–0	1–0	1–1	1–0		4–1	2–0	3–0	2–2
Vasas	1–0	1–0	0–0	2–0	2–2	1–0	2–2	2–1	0–1	1–2	1–0	0–2		1–4	2–2	0–0
Váci Izzó	1–1	0–0	2–1	1–0	0–0	1–1	0–0	2–1	2–2	1–2	2–0	1–0	3–2		0–1	1–1
Veszprém	2–0	0–0	4–0	1–1	0–0	4–1	2–1	0–0	0–1	0–0	0–1	1–0	1–0	1–1		0–0
Videoton	0–1	0–2	1–0	0–1	1–0	1–2	3–2	0–1	1–0	3–0	1–0	1–0	1–1	2–1	1–0	

Source: rsssf.com
Legend: Blue = home team win; Yellow = draw; Red = away team win.

== Relegation play-offs ==
Team 1	Agg.	Team 2	1st leg	2nd leg
Budapest Honvéd (I)	3–2	Kazincbarcikai Vegyés (II)	1–0	2–2
Dunaferr (II)	1–2	Debreceni MVSC (I)	1–1	0–1

== Statistical leaders ==
=== Top goalscorers ===
Rank	Scorer	Club	Goals
1	(Hungary) József Dzurják	Ferencvárosi TC	18
2	(Hungary) Róbert Jován	MTK-VM	12
3	(Hungary) Tibor Balog	MTK-VM	9
3	(Hungary) László Répási	Váci Izzó	9
3	(Hungary) István Schäffer	Szombathelyi Haladás	9
6	(Hungary) Sándor Bácsi	Újpesti Dózsa	8
6	(Hungary) József Duró	Vasas	8
6	(Hungary) Imre Fodor	Budapest Honvéd	8
6	(Hungary) Ferenc Lovász	Pécsi MSC	8
6	(Hungary) Péter Rubold	Újpesti Dózsa	8
6	(Hungary) György Szeibert	Ferencvárosi TC	8

== Attendances ==
Average home league attendance top 3:

#	Club	Average
1	Ferencváros	14,800
2	Pécs	8,000
3	Haladás	6,953
