= József Dzurják =

Hungarian football manager and player (born 1962)

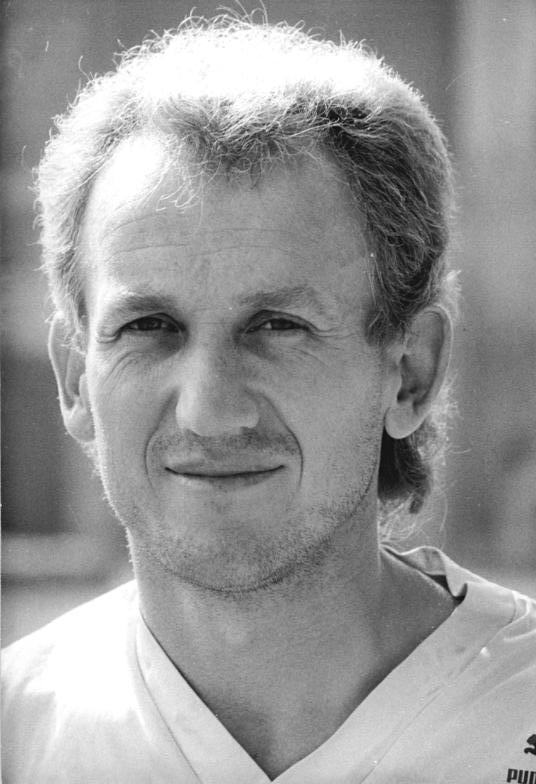

Personal information
- Date of birth: 2 March 1962 (age 64)
- Place of birth: Gödöllő, Hungary
- Height: 1.89 m (6 ft 2 1/2 in)
- Position: Forward

Team information
- Current team: Diósgyőri VTK; Assistant manager

Youth career
- 1972–1976: Ikladi Vasas
- 1976–1982: Jászberényi Lehel
- 1980: Jászárokszállási Vasas
- 1982: Békéscsaba
- 1982–1983: L. Szabó Hónved SE

Senior career*
Years	Team	Apps	(Gls)
1983–1986	Diósgyőri VTK	?	(55)
1986–1990	Ferencváros	96	(44)
1990	Chemnitzer FC	6	(1)
1990	Spartak Subotica	3	(0)
1991	Ferencváros	9	(2)
1991–1993	Omonia Nicosia	48	(34)
1993	III. Kerület	10	(2)
1994–1995	Vác FC	16	(8)
1995–1996	Diósgyőri VTK	3	(1)
1996	SC Orchid		

International career
1987	Hungary olympic	2	(1)

Managerial career
- 1998–1999: Dunakeszi
- 1999–2000: Diósgyőri VTK (assistant manager)
- 2000–2001: KF Tirana (assistant manager)
- 2001–2003: BVSC Budapest
- 2003: Videoton (assistant manager)
- 2003–2004: Ferencváros U-19
- 2004–2005: Malaysia (assistant manager)
- 2005–2006: Zalaegerszegi TE (assistant manager)
- 2006–2007: Hungary U-19 (assistant manager)
- 2008–2009: Club Valencia
- 2011–2012: Ferencváros U-17
- 2012: Diósgyőri VTK (assistant manager)
- 2014–2015: Rákospalota
- * Club domestic league appearances and goals

József Dzurják (born 2 March 1962) is a Hungarian professional football manager and former player.

== Playing career ==
His youth career was at Ikladi Vasas, Jászberényi Lehel, Jászárokszállási Vasas, Békéscsaba, and L. Szabó Hónved SE.

He made his debut in the Nemzeti Bajnokság I in the season 1983–84 playing with Diósgyőri VTK. That season his team ended up relegated and played in Nemzeti Bajnokság II with Dzurják being the league top-scorer two seasons in a raw. In 1986, he moved to Hungarian giants Ferencváros where he played till 1990. He finished his last season with Fradi as league top scorer. This meant that for Dzurják was time to move abroad, signing with the East German 1990 vice-champions Chemnitzer FC, being one of the few foreigners to play in the last season of the DDR-Oberliga. After six months during the winter break, he moved to FK Spartak Subotica where he spend the rest of the season playing in the Yugoslav First League. After this, he returned and played half season with Ferencvaros, before moving again, this time to Cyprus, to play with AC Omonia one and a half seasons. He will return to Hungary and play with III. Kerületi TUE, Vác FC and Diósgyőri VTK before moving to the Maldives in 1996 where he ended his career. He played as a striker.

== International career ==
On 13 May 1987, Dzurják received a call on behalf of coach József Verebes to be part of the Hungary Olympic team and played in a game against Spain scoring a goal in the game. He then also played against Sweden on 9 September, same year.

== Coaching career ==
After retiring, he initially became a sports journalist at Nemzeti Sport. Then he started his coaching career, first coaching the youth teams of Dunakeszi, BVSC, Rákospalota and the U-17 and U-19 teams of Ferencváros. Then he worked as assistant manager, initially in Hungary at Diósgyőr, Videoton and Zalaegerszeg, and then abroad in Albania, Malaysia and the Maldives, where he won the championship.

In March 2008 he was appointed the main coach of Club Valencia competing in the Dhivehi League, the top league in the Maldives. Since 2012 he has been assistant manager at Diósgyőri VTK.

In the summer of 2014, Dzurják was appointed as manager of Nemzeti Bajnokság III side REAC. He achieved a third place with the team in the central group of the 2014–15 season. However, on 16 October 2015, Dzurják was sacked as the club's manager, with the team at the bottom of the table after ten games of the 2015–16 season.

== Honours ==
=== As player ===
Diósgyőri VTK

- Nemzeti Bajnokság II top scorer: 1984–85, 1985–86

Ferencvaros

- Nemzeti Bajnokság I top scorer: 1989–90
- Magyar Kupa: 1991

Omonia Nicosia

- Cypriot First Division: 1992–93
- Cypriot First Division top-scorer: 1991–92 (21 goals)

=== As manager ===
Club Valencia

- Dhivehi League: 2008
- Maldives National Championship: 2008
