= Balázs Lászka =

Hungarian footballer (born 1978)

Personal information
- Date of birth: 26 May 1978 (age 48)
- Place of birth: Budapest, Hungary
- Height: 1.75 m (5 ft 9 in)
- Position: Midfielder

Youth career
- Dreher
- Szent István
- –1999: Ferencváros

Senior career*
Years	Team	Apps	(Gls)
1999–2002	Ferencváros	10	(1)
2000	→ Kecskemét (loan)	3	(0)
2001	→ Pápa (loan)	20	(0)
2001	→ Siófok (loan)	17	(4)
2002	→ Kispest-Honvéd (loan)	7	(0)
2002–2007	Pápa	99	(2)
2007–2014	Budaörs	171	(9)
2014–2018	Rákospalota	99	(3)
Total		426	(19)

Managerial career
- 2018–2019: Rákospalota
- * Club domestic league appearances and goals

Balázs Lászka (born 26 May 1978) is a Hungarian football manager and former professional player.

== Club career ==
Lászka spent the first half of the 2001–02 season on loan from Nemzeti Bajnokság I club Ferencváros to Nemzeti Bajnokság II side Siófok.

== Managerial career ==
Lászka was dismissed as manager of Rákospalota on 4 June 2019, after the team failed in its season-long objective of winning the 2018–19 Budapest Championship and securing promotion, culminating in a decisive 0–3 defeat to Kelen on 31 May 2019.

== Career statistics ==
=== Club ===
Appearances and goals by club, season and competition
Club	Season	League			Magyar Kupa		Ligakupa		Europe		Other		Total	
Club	Season	Division	Apps	Goals	Apps	Goals	Apps	Goals	Apps	Goals	Apps	Goals	Apps	Goals
Ferencváros	1999–2000	Nemzeti Bajnokság I	10	1	—		—		1 (Note: Appearance in UEFA Cup)	0	—		11	1
Kecskemét (loan)	2000–01	Nemzeti Bajnokság II	3	0	—		—		—		—		3	0
Pápa (loan)	2000–01	Nemzeti Bajnokság II	20	0	—		—		—		—		20	0
Siófok (loan)	2001–02	Nemzeti Bajnokság II	17	4	4	0	—		—		—		21	4
Kispest-Honvéd (loan)	2001–02	Nemzeti Bajnokság I	7	0	—		—		—		—		7	0
Pápa	2002–03	Nemzeti Bajnokság II	32	1	3	1	—		—		—		35	2
Pápa	2003–04	Nemzeti Bajnokság II	21	0	—		—		—		—		21	0
Pápa	2004–05	Nemzeti Bajnokság I	26	1	3	0	—		—		—		29	1
Pápa	2005–06	Nemzeti Bajnokság I	9	0	1	0	—		4 (Note: Appearances in UEFA Intertoto Cup)	0	—		14	0
Pápa	2006–07	Nemzeti Bajnokság II	11	0	3	0	—		—		—		14	0
Pápa	Total		99	2	10	1	—		4	0	—		113	3
Budaörs	2006–07	Nemzeti Bajnokság II	12	0	—		—		—		—		12	0
Budaörs	2007–08	Nemzeti Bajnokság II	26	0	2	0	—		—		—		28	0
Budaörs	2008–09	Nemzeti Bajnokság II	23	0	1	0	10	0	—		—		34	0
Budaörs	2009–10	Nemzeti Bajnokság II	19	2	2	0	—		—		—		21	2
Budaörs	2010–11	Nemzeti Bajnokság II	28	4	2	0	—		—		—		30	4
Budaörs	2011–12	Nemzeti Bajnokság II	24	1	2	1	—		—		—		26	2
Budaörs	2012–13	Nemzeti Bajnokság III	21	1	2	0	—		—		4 (Note: Three appearances in Pest Megyei Kupa and one appearance in Nemzeti Bajnokság III promotion play-offs)	0	27	1
Budaörs	2013–14	Nemzeti Bajnokság III	18	1	—		—		—		—		18	1
Budaörs	Total		171	9	11	1	10	0	—		4	0	196	10
Rákospalota	2014–15	Nemzeti Bajnokság III	25	1	2	0	—		—		—		27	1
Rákospalota	2015–16	Nemzeti Bajnokság III	30	0	1	0	—		—		—		31	0
Rákospalota	2016–17	Nemzeti Bajnokság III	24	0	3	0	—		—		—		27	0
Rákospalota	2017–18	Megyei Bajnokság I	20	2	—		—		—		4 (Note: One appearance in Magyar Kupa qualifying rounds, two appearances in Budapest Kupa, one appearance in Megyei Bajnokság I promotion play-offs)	—	24	2
Rákospalota	Total		99	3	6	0	—		—		4	0	109	3
Career total			426	19	31	2	10	0	5	0	8	0	480	21

=== Managerial ===
Managerial record by team and tenure
Team	From	To	Record					Ref
Team	From	To	P	W	D	L	Win %	Ref
Rákospalota	1 September 2018	31 May 2019	32	24	6	2	75.00	
Total			32	24	6	2	75.00	

== Honours ==
Siófok

- Nemzeti Bajnokság II – West: 2001–02

Budaörs

- Nemzeti Bajnokság III – Duna: 2012–13

Rákospalota

- Megyei Bajnokság I – Budapest: 2017–18
- Budapest Kupa: 2017–18
