= Marijan Nikolić =

Croatian football player

Personal information
- Date of birth: 31 October 1983 (age 42)
- Place of birth: Osijek, SFR Yugoslavia
- Height: 1.85 m (6 ft 1 in)
- Position: Defender

Team information
- Current team: NK Darda

Youth career
- Partizan

Senior career*
Years	Team	Apps	(Gls)
2003–2004	Olimpija Osijek		
2004–2005	Nyíregyháza	23	(10)
2005–2006	Lombard Pápa	8	(0)
2006	Nyíregyháza	8	(0)
2006	Olimpija Osijek		
2007	Belišće	15	(8)
2007	Inter Zaprešić	5	(0)
2008	Kamen Ingrad	12	(9)
2008–2009	Istra 1961	17	(6)
2010	Olimpija Osijek	14	(11)
2010–2012	Bijelo Brdo		
2013–2014	Mladost Antin		
2014–2020	Čepin		
2020	Borac Kneževi Vinogradi		
2020–	NK Darda		
- * Club domestic league appearances and goals as of 20 January 2012

Marijan Nikolić (born 31 October 1981) is a Croatian football player. He currently plays for NK Darda, whom he joined from Borac in July 2020.
