= Ádám Baranyai =

Hungarian footballer

Personal information
- Date of birth: 5 March 1993 (age 33)
- Place of birth: Budapest, Hungary
- Height: 1.78 m (5 ft 10 in)
- Position: Left back

Team information
- Current team: Komárno
- Number: 80

Youth career
- 2003–2007: MTK Budapest
- 2007–2012: Újpest

Senior career*
Years	Team	Apps	(Gls)
2012–2014	Újpest II	16	(0)
2014–2015	Siófok	11	(0)
2015	Rákospalota	9	(0)
2015–2019	Csákvár	117	(1)
2019–2021	Kisvárda	7	(0)
2021–2023	Csákvár	14	(0)
2023–	Komárno	3	(0)
- * Club domestic league appearances and goals as of 2 April 2024

Ádám Baranyai (born 5 March 1993) is a Hungarian professional footballer who plays for Slovak club Komárno.

== Career statistics ==
As of 20 September 2020.

Appearances and goals by club, season and competition
Club	Season	League			Cup		Other (Note: Includes Ligakupa)		Total	
Club	Season	Division	Apps	Goals	Apps	Goals	Apps	Goals	Apps	Goals
Újpest II	2011–12	Nemzeti Bajnokság II	3	0	—		0	0	3	0
Újpest II	2012–13	Nemzeti Bajnokság II	13	0	—		4	0	17	0
Újpest II	Total		16	0	0	0	4	0	20	0
Siófok	2014–15	Nemzeti Bajnokság II	11	0	1	0	4	0	16	0
Rákospalota	2014–15	Nemzeti Bajnokság III	9	0	0	0	0	0	9	0
Csákvár	2015–16	Nemzeti Bajnokság II	29	0	3	0	0	0	32	0
Csákvár	2016–17	Nemzeti Bajnokság II	35	1	2	0	0	0	37	1
Csákvár	2017–18	Nemzeti Bajnokság II	22	0	0	0	0	0	22	0
Csákvár	2018–19	Nemzeti Bajnokság II	31	0	1	0	0	0	32	0
Csákvár	Total		117	1	6	0	0	0	123	1
Kisvárda	2019–20	Nemzeti Bajnokság I	5	0	2	0	0	0	7	0
Kisvárda	2020–21	Nemzeti Bajnokság I	2	0	1	0	0	0	3	0
Kisvárda	Total		7	0	3	0	0	0	10	0
Career total			160	1	10	0	8	0	178	1
