= Sándor Bácsi =

Hungarian footballer

Personal information
- Full name: Sándor Bácsi
- Date of birth: 26 November 1969 (age 56)
- Place of birth: Budapest, Hungary
- Position: Forward

Youth career
- 1986-1987: Újpest FC

Senior career*
Years	Team	Apps	(Gls)
1987-1989	Volán FC		
1989-1993	Újpest FC	81	(20)
1993	Vasas SC		
1993-1994	Gödöllői LC		

International career
1989-1991	Hungary	2	(0)
- * Club domestic league appearances and goals

Sándor Bácsi (26 November 1969) is a former Hungarian professional footballer who played as a forward. He was a member of the Hungary national team.

== Career ==
=== Volán FC ===
He made his debut for Volán FC in NBII at the age of eighteen. He was considered to be a huge talent, and his incredible running speed and Maradona-like physique, combined with his agility, gave him the right to be so. In September 1987, he made his debut in the second division at home against III. Kerületi TVE, coming on at the break and making it 2–2 with two goals in two minutes!

=== Újpest FC ===
He played for Újpest FC from 1986. He made his debut in the top flight in 1989. He was a member of the 1989-90 champion team and of the team that won the Hungarian Cup two years later against Vác FC. He was also a member of the Újpest FC team that won the Szuperkupa against Ferencvárosi TC.

=== Gödöllői LC ===
He constantly struggled with weight problems. In 1993 he played for Vasas SC for a short time, but he could not adapt to the demands of the first division and continued his career with Gödöllői LC.

=== National team ===
Between 1989 and 1991 he played 2 times for the Hungary national team.

== Honours ==
- Nemzeti Bajnokság I (NB I)
  - Champion: 1989
- Magyar Kupa (MNK)
  - Winner: 1992
