= Zoltán Váczi =

Hungarian footballer

Personal information
- Date of birth: 5 February 1966 (age 60)
- Place of birth: Hungary
- Position: Midfielder

Senior career*
Years	Team	Apps	(Gls)
	Nyíregyházi Volán Dózsa	12+	(4+)
-1991	Kabai Egyetértés SE	37+	(12+)
1991-1993	Debreceni VSC	26	(8)
1993-1995	Békéscsaba 1912 Előre	38	(7)
1995-1999	Vasas SC	61	(19)
1999-2000	Budapest Honvéd FC	5	(1)
1999-2000	Ferencvárosi TC	8	(1)
2000-2002	Kecskeméti TE		
2001-2002	Vasas SC	11	(4)
2002	Ózdi FC		
- FC Dabas
- Enying VSE
2006-2007	Kaszaper FC	10	(2)

International career
1998	Hungary	2	(0)
- * Club domestic league appearances and goals

Zoltán Váczi (born 5 February 1966 in Hungary) is a Hungarian retired footballer.
