= Mihály Tóth (footballer, born 1974) =

Hungarian footballer

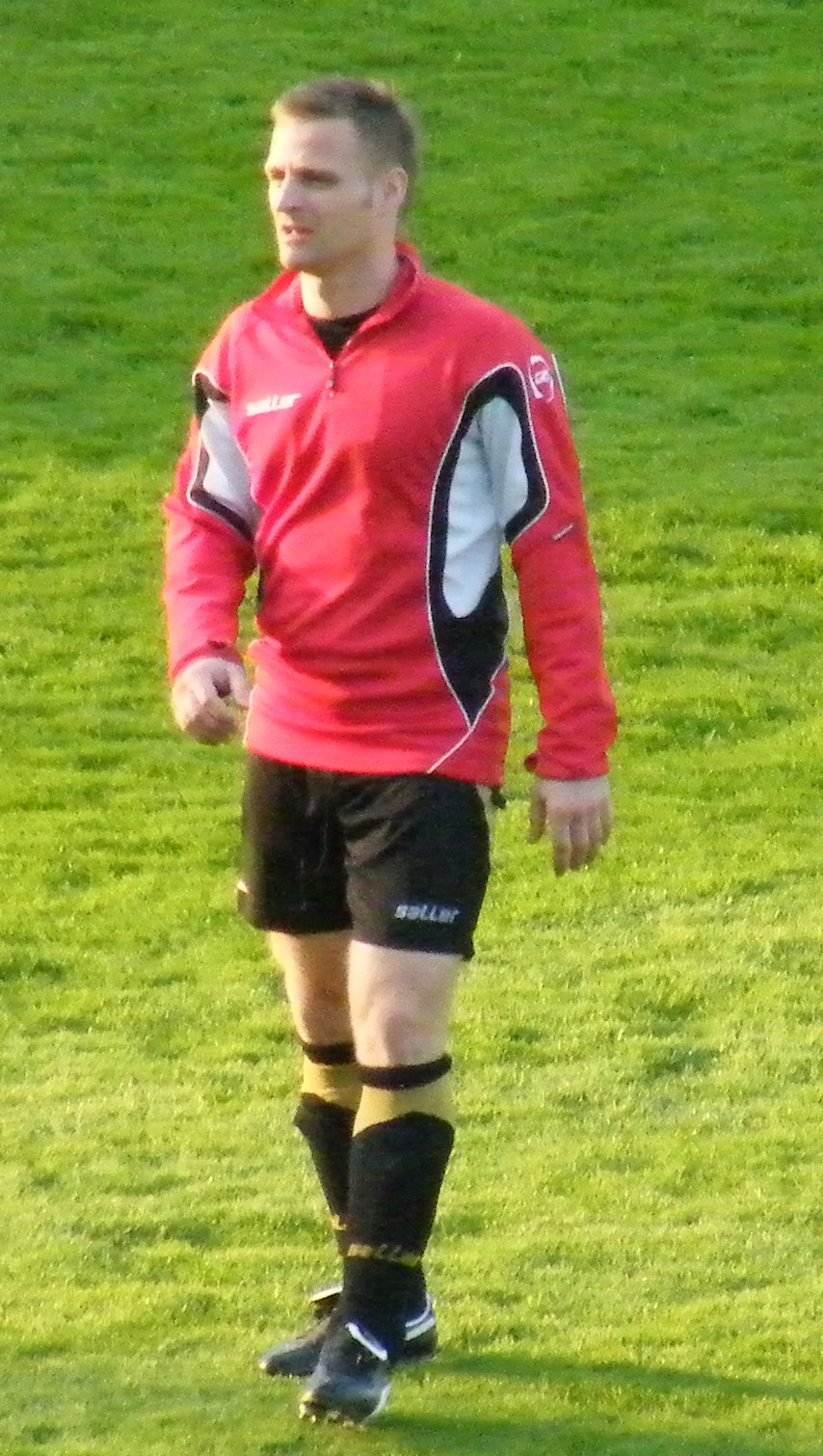

Personal information
- Full name: Mihály Tóth
- Date of birth: 27 December 1974 (age 51)
- Place of birth: Budapest, Hungary
- Height: 1.78 m (5 ft 10 in)
- Position: Forward

Senior career*
Years	Team	Apps	(Gls)
1993–1994	Budapest Honvéd FC	7	(1)
1994–1995	FC Fehérvár	12	(0)
1995–1997	Budapest Honvéd FC	56	(18)
1997–1998	Germinal Ekeren	10	(1)
1998–1999	FC Metz	11	(3)
1999	Club Africain	19	(9)
1999–2001	Ferencvárosi TC	57	(24)
2001–2005	FC Sopron	127	(56)
2005–2007	Fredrikstad FK	30	(8)
2007	Budapest Honvéd FC	4	(0)
2007–2008	Panahaiki	18	(1)
2008–2009	Diósgyőri VTK	13	(6)
2009–2010	Szolnoki MÁV FC	0	(0)
2010–2011	Szigetszentmiklósi TK	11	(5)
2011	Törtel KSK		
2011–2013	Nagykőrösi Kinizsi FC		

International career
2004	Hungary	1	(0)

Managerial career
- 2024: Mezőkövesdi SE
- 2025: FC Dabas
- 2026–: Ferencvárosi TC II
- * Club domestic league appearances and goals

Mihály Tóth (born 27 December 1974) is a Hungarian manager and former footballer. He currently manages Hungarian National Championship II Ferencvárosi TC II.

He previously played for MFC Sopron and Fredrikstad F.K. of Norway.

== Managerial career ==
On 29 May 2024, he was appointed as the manager of Mezőkövesdi SE. On 9 September 2024, he was dismissed.

== Honours ==
- Hungarian League Top Scorer:1
  - 2004
- Magyar Kupa:1
  - 2005
- Norwegian Football Cup:1
  - 2006
