= Kótaj =

Coordinates: 48°03′N 21°43′E

- Interactive map of Kótaj
- Country: Hungary
- County: Szabolcs-Szatmár-Bereg

Area
  - Total: 25.93 km^{2} (10.01 sq mi)

Population (2015)
  - Total: 4,436
  - Density: 171.1/km^{2} (443/sq mi)
- Time zone: UTC+1 (CET)
  - Summer (DST): UTC+2 (CEST)
- Postal code: 4482
- Area code: 42

Location of Szabolcs-Szatmar-Bereg county in Hungary

Kótaj is a village in Szabolcs-Szatmár-Bereg county, in the Northern Great Plain region of eastern Hungary.

== Geography ==
It covers an area of 25.93 km^{2} (10 sq mi) and has a population of 4436 people (2015).
