= Árpád Gögh =

Slovak footballer (born 1972)

Arpád Gögh
Personal information
- Date of birth: 13 October 1972 (age 54)
- Place of birth: Horná Potôň, Czechoslovakia
- Height: 1.76 m (5 ft 9 in)
- Position: Midfielder

Team information
- Current team: Gabčíkovo
- Number: 12

Senior career*
| Years | Team | Apps | (Gls) |
| 1992–1993 | Dunajská Streda | 14 | (1) |
| 1993–1994 | Humenné | 29 | (2) |
| 1994–1997 | Dunajská Streda | 40 | (0) |
| 1997–1998 | Győr | 19 | (0) |
| 1998–1999 | Dunajská Streda | 33 | (16) |
| 1999–2000 | Pécsi MFC | 12 | (2) |
| 1999–2001 | Slovan Bratislava | 31 | (1) |
| 2001–2002 | Győr | 9 | (1) |
| 2002 | Dunajská Streda | | |
| 2003–2005 | FC Stadlau | | |
| 2005 | Neusiedl/See | | |
| 2006 | SV Gols | | |
| 2006–2007 | Dunajská Streda | | |
| 2007–2008 | Senec | | |
| 2008 | Galanta | | |
| 2009–2012 | FC Okoličná na Ostrove | | |
| 2012 | → OFK Rapid Ohrady (loan) | | |
| 2013–2014 | Veľký Meder | | |
| 2014–2015 | Gabčíkovo | | |

Managerial career
- 2016–: MŠK - Thermál Veľký Meder
- * Club domestic league appearances and goals as of 16 March 2013

Arpád Gögh (born 13 October 1972) is a Slovak football midfielder who last played for club Gabčíkovo.
