= Attila Farkas =

Hungarian football player

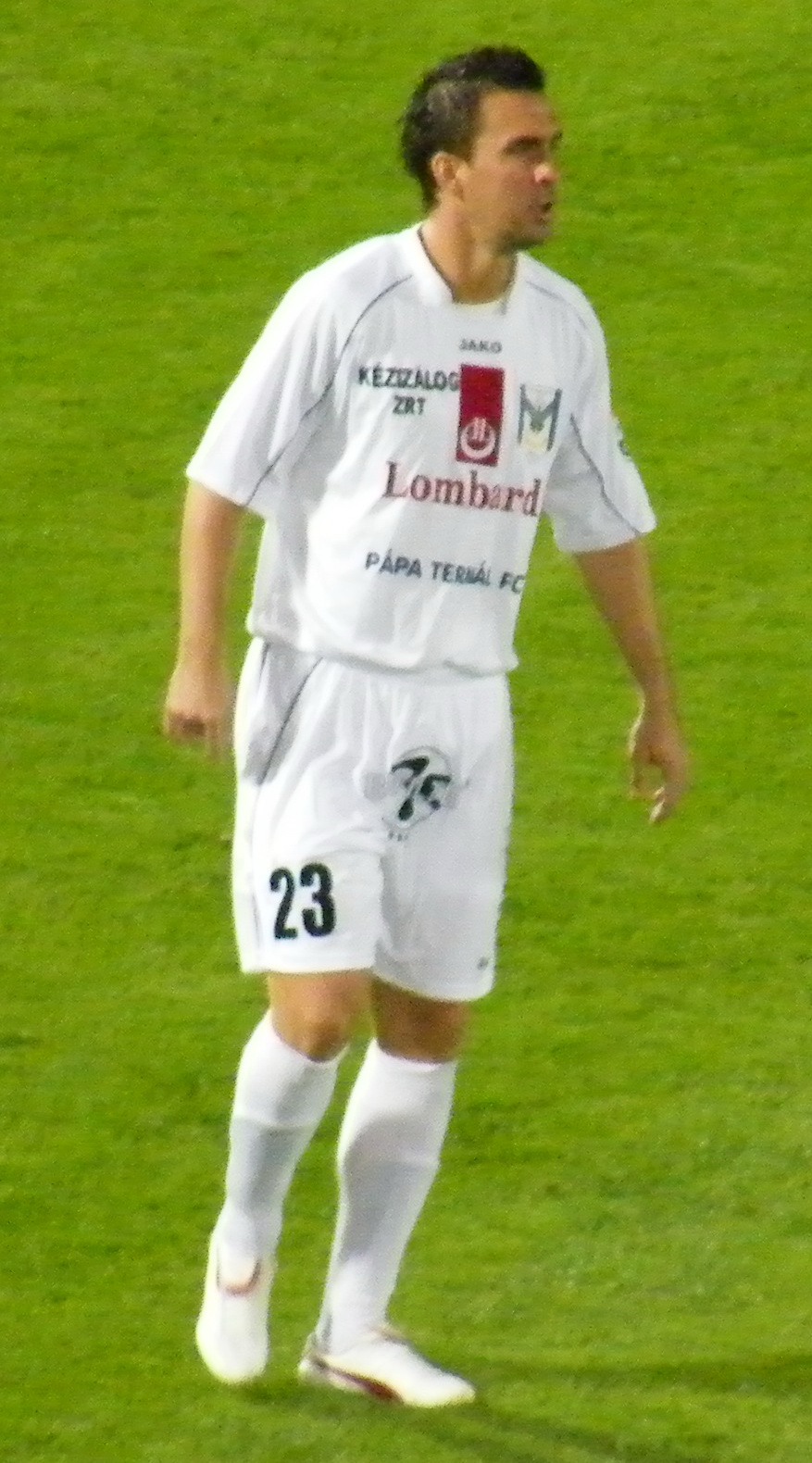

Personal information
- Full name: Attila Farkas
- Date of birth: 5 October 1978 (age 48)
- Place of birth: Pyongyang, North Korea
- Height: 1.86 m (6 ft 1 in)
- Position: Defender

Team information
- Current team: Nyíregyháza Spartacus
- Number: 17

Youth career
- 1992–1995: BVSC Budapest
- 1995–1997: MTK Budapest FC

Senior career*
Years	Team	Apps	(Gls)
1997–1998	MTK Hungária FC	3	(0)
1998–2001	BKV Előre SC	63	(2)
2001–2002	FC Tatabánya	?	(?)
2002–2004	Szombathelyi Haladás	63	(1)
2004–2012	Lombard-Pápa TFC	164	(12)
2007–2008	→ FC Sopron (loan)	15	(0)
2012–	Nyíregyháza Spartacus	1	(0)
- * Club domestic league appearances and goals as of 17 August 2012

Attila Farkas (born 5 October 1978) is a Hungarian football player who currently plays for Nyíregyháza Spartacus.
