= Ákos Kovrig =

Hungarian footballer

Personal information
- Full name: Ákos Kovrig
- Date of birth: 2 June 1982 (age 44)
- Place of birth: Hungary
- Position: Striker

Senior career*
Years	Team	Apps	(Gls)
2002–2005	Vasas SC		
2005	Lombard-Pápa TFC		
2006	Maccabi Netanya		
2006	Hapoel Haifa		
2006–2007	Kecskeméti TE		
2007–2009	SV Mattersburg		
2009–2010	Szolnoki MÁV FC		
2012–present	Avaldsnes IL		
- * Club domestic league appearances and goals

Ákos Kovrig (Hungarian: Kovrig Ákos; born 2 June 1982, ?) is a Hungarian football player who currently plays for Szolnoki MÁV FC in Hungary. Korvig plays in the midfield, and can play either centrally or on the left side.

Kovrig previously played for Lombard-Pápa TFC in the NB I.
