= Bojan Spasojević (footballer, born 1980) =

Serbian footballer

Personal information
- Full name: Bojan Spasojević
- Date of birth: 26 July 1980 (age 46)
- Place of birth: Kraljevo, SFR Yugoslavia
- Height: 1.81 m (5 ft 11 in)
- Position: Forward

Senior career*
Years	Team	Apps	(Gls)
2001–2005	Čukarički	60	(13)
2002–2003	→ Komgrap (loan)		
2005	Zalaegerszeg	14	(1)
2006	Voždovac	12	(2)
2006–2007	Floriana	5	(0)
2007–2008	Metalac Gornji Milanovac	20	(7)
2008	Sevojno	13	(3)
2009	Metalurg Skopje	10	(1)
2009–2010	Sloga Kraljevo	29	(4)
2010–2013	Kozara Gradiška	13+	(2+)
2013–2016	Borac Šamac		
- * Club domestic league appearances and goals

Bojan Spasojević (Serbian Cyrillic: Бојан Спасојевић; born 26 July 1980) is a Serbian footballer.

== Career ==
During his career, he has played for First League of FR Yugoslavia club FK Čukarički, FK Komgrap, Hungarian Zalaegerszegi TE, First League of Serbia and Montenegro club FK Voždovac, Maltese Floriana F.C., Serbian First League clubs FK Metalac Gornji Milanovac and FK Sevojno and Macedonian FK Metalurg Skopje before returning to his hometown club FK Sloga Kraljevo in 2009.
