= Zoltán Zöld =

Hungarian association football player

Personal information
- Date of birth: 20 August 1979 (age 47)
- Place of birth: Hungary
- Height: 1.88 m (6 ft 2 in)
- Position: Midfielder

Youth career
- Ferencváros

Senior career*
Years	Team	Apps	(Gls)
1999	Ferencváros	1	(0)
2000–2001	Melbourne Knights	17	(0)
- Dandenong Thunder
	Tatabánya	1+	(0+)
2004–2005	Fehérvár	13	(0)
2007	Gmunden	13	(0)
2008–2009	Union Gschwandt	31	(2)
2009–2015	WSC Hertha		
2015–2016	Pichl	20	(3)
2016	Eintracht Wels	12	(0)
2017–2018	Union Thalheim		
- * Club domestic league appearances and goals

Zoltán Zöld (born 20 August 1979) is a Hungarian former professional footballer who played as a midfielder.

== Career ==
Before the second half of the 1999–2000 season, Zöld signed for Melbourne Knights in the Australian top flight from Ferencváros, Hungary's most successful club, before joining Dandenong Thunder in the Australian lower leagues.

Before the second half of the 2007–08 season, he signed for Austrian lower league team Union Gschwandt from SV Gmunden in the Austrian third division.
