= 2008–09 BFC Siófok season =

Siófok
2008–09 season
- Manager: Lajos Détári (until 1 January 2009); Zoltán Aczél (from 1 January 2009)
- Stadium: Révész Géza utcai Stadion
- Nemzeti Bajnokság I: 15th (relegated)
- Magyar Kupa: Semi-finals
- Ligakupa: Group stage
- Highest home attendance: 5,000 v Újpest (9 August 2008, Nemzeti Bajnokság I)
- Lowest home attendance: 50 v Budaörs (1 October 2008, Ligakupa)
- Average home league attendance: 1,280
- Biggest win: 8–1 v MTK (Away, 15 October 2008, Ligakupa)
- Biggest defeat: 0–5 v Haladás (Away, 22 August 2008, Nemzeti Bajnokság I)

The 2008–09 season was Bodajk Football Club Siófok's 17th competitive season, 2nd consecutive season in the Nemzeti Bajnokság I and 78th season in existence as a football club. In addition to the domestic league, Siófok participated in that season's editions of the Magyar Kupa and the Ligakupa.

== Squad ==
Squad at end of season

Note: Flags indicate national team as defined under FIFA eligibility rules; some limited exceptions apply. Players may hold more than one non-FIFA nationality.

No.	Pos.	Nation	Player
1	GK	HUN	Pál Szalma
2	DF	HUN	József Mogyorósi
3	DF	HUN	András László
4	DF	HUN	András Forgács
5	DF	HUN	László Sütő
6	DF	HUN	Richárd Tusori
7	FW	HUN	József Magasföldi
8	MF	HUN	Lajos Nagy
9	MF	HUN	Gellért Ivancsics
10	MF	HUN	Attila Andruskó
11	MF	HUN	Szabolcs Kanta
12	MF	AUT	Daniel Kogler
13	MF	SRB	Marko Basara
14	DF	HUN	Gábor Horváth

No.	Pos.	Nation	Player
15	FW	CMR	Georges Ekounda
16	MF	HUN	Bence Horváth
17	FW	HUN	Gábor Koós
18	FW	HUN	Marcell Takács
19	DF	HUN	Dániel Köntös
20	FW	BRA	Roni Ribeiro
23	MF	CMR	Eugene Fomumbod
24	MF	HUN	Attila Horváth
26	GK	HUN	Milán Balikó
27	MF	HUN	László Bojtor
28	FW	CMR	Edouard Ndjodo
32	GK	HUN	Árpád Milinte
33	DF	HUN	Gyula Hegedűs

== Competitions ==
=== Overview ===
Competition	First match	Last match	Starting round	Final position	Record							
Competition	First match	Last match	Starting round	Final position	Pld	W	D	L	GF	GA	GD	Win %
Nemzeti Bajnokság I	26 July 2008	30 May 2009	Matchday 1	15th	30	8	2	20	30	56	−26	26.67
Magyar Kupa	4 September 2008	21 April 2009	Third round	Semi-finals	8	5	2	1	19	6	+13	62.50
Ligakupa	1 October 2008	14 February 2009	Group stage	Group stage	10	4	2	4	20	16	+4	40.00
Total					48	17	6	25	69	78	−9	35.42

Source: Competitions

=== Nemzeti Bajnokság I ===
==== League table ====
Pos	Team	Pld	W	D	L	GF	GA	GD	Pts	Qualification or relegation
12	Diósgyőr	30	9	6	15	29	45	−16	33	
13	Budapest Honvéd	30	8	8	14	31	46	−15	32	Qualification for Europa League third qualifying round (Note: Budapest Honvéd won the 2008–09 Hungarian Cup and thereby qualified for the third qualifying round of the UEFA Europa League.)
14	Nyíregyháza	30	7	11	12	32	41	−9	32	
15	Siófok (R)	30	8	2	20	30	56	−26	26	Relegation to Nemzeti Bajnokság II
16	Rákospalota (R)	30	3	6	21	33	73	−40	15	Relegation to Nemzeti Bajnokság II

Source: soccerway.com
Rules for classification: 1st points; 2nd overall wins; 3rd goal difference; 4th goals scored
(R) Relegated

==== Results summary ====
Overall								Home						Away					
Pld	W	D	L	GF	GA	GD	Pts	W	D	L	GF	GA	GD	W	D	L	GF	GA	GD
30	8	2	20	30	56	−26	26	5	1	9	18	25	−7	3	1	11	12	31	−19

Source: Hungarian Football Federation

==== Results by round ====
Round	1	2	3	4	5	6	7	8	9	10	11	12	13	14	15	16	17	18	19	20	21	22	23	24	25	26	27	28	29	30
Ground	H	A	H	H	A	H	A	H	A	H	A	H	A	H	A	A	H	A	A	H	A	H	A	H	A	H	A	H	A	H
Result	W	L	L	L	L	L	L	D	L	L	L	W	L	L	D	L	W	L	W	L	L	W	L	L	W	L	W	L	L	W
Position	5	8	13	15	16	16	16	16	16	16	16	15	15	15	15	15	15	15	15	15	15	15	15	15	15	15	15	15	15	15
Points	3	3	3	3	3	3	3	4	4	4	4	7	7	7	8	8	11	11	14	14	14	17	17	17	20	20	23	23	23	26

Source: Matches
A = Away; H = Home; W = Win; D = Draw; L = Loss

==== Matches ====
26 July 2008 1	Siófok	1–0	Fehérvár	Siófok
20:00 CEST (UTC+2)	Sütő 17'	Report	Sifter (yellow card) 72'	Stadium: Révész Géza utcai Stadion; Attendance: 4,500; Referee: Zoltán Iványi; Assistant referees: Zsolt Szpisják, István Albert; Fourth official: Attila Hegedűs

2 August 2008 2	Nyíregyháza	1–0	Siófok	Nyíregyháza
20:00 CEST (UTC+2)	Cornaci (yellow card) 31', (goal) 67'; Zabos (yellow card) 45'; Dosso (yellow card) 56'; Lippai (yellow card) 58'	Report	Magasföldi (yellow card) 45'; Lipcsei (yellow card) 68'; Forgács (yellow card) 84'	Stadium: Városi Stadion; Attendance: 5,200; Referee: Gergely Sulyok; Assistant referees: Attila Kelemen, Dr. Zsolt Varga; Fourth official: Ádám Farkas

9 August 2008 3	Siófok	0–1	Újpest	Siófok
20:00 CEST (UTC+2)	Fülöp (yellow card) 60'; Sütő (yellow card) 65'; Mogyorósi (red card) 83'	Report	Jucemar (yellow card) 26'; Kabát (yellow card) 41'; Rajczi 83'	Stadium: Révész Géza utcai Stadion; Attendance: 5,000; Referee: József Berger; Assistant referees: Attila Forgács, Szabolcs Deutsch; Fourth official: Balázs Berke

16 August 2008 4	Siófok	0–1	Vasas	Siófok
20:00 CEST (UTC+2)	At. Horváth (yellow card) 29'; G. Hegedűs (yellow card) 31'; Forgács (yellow card) 84'; Sütő (red card) 90+1'	Report	Tóth B. (yellow card) 65'; Sowunmi 81'	Stadium: Révész Géza utcai Stadion; Attendance: 2,000; Referee: Szabolcs Szilasi; Assistant referees: György Ring, Zsolt Márton; Fourth official: Dávid Ákos

22 August 2008 5	Haladás	5–0	Siófok	Szombathely
20:00 CEST (UTC+2)	Guzmics 21'; Rajos 26'; Kenesei 48' (pen.), 73'; Oross 56'	Report	Basara (yellow card) 38'; Mogyorósi (yellow card) 48'; Forgács (yellow card) 51'	Stadium: Rohonci út Attendance: 7,000; Referee: Sándor Andó-Szabó; Assistant referees: Róbert Kispál, Balázs Farkas; Fourth official: Csaba Molnár

31 August 2008 6	Siófok	0–4	Debrecen	Siófok
20:00 CEST (UTC+2)	Lipcsei (yellow card) 59'; Basara (yellow card) 90+2'	Report	Leandro 4'; Bíró 33'; P. Szakály 51'; Rudolf 62'	Stadium: Révész Géza utcai Stadion; Attendance: 1,000; Referee: István Vad; Assistant referees: Vencel Tóth II, István Albert; Fourth official: Gergő Janitz

13 September 2008 7	Kecskemét	3–0	Siófok	Kecskemét
20:00 CEST (UTC+2)	Savić 1'; Montvai 51', 78', (yellow card) 51'	Report	Köntös (yellow card) 28'; Magasföldi (yellow card) 50'; Habi (yellow card) 62'; Lipcsei (yellow card) 64'; G. Hegedűs (yellow card) 76'; Fülöp (yellow card) 80'	Stadium: Széktói Stadion; Attendance: 4,000; Referee: Zsolt Szabó; Assistant referees: Róbert Kispál, Zsolt Szpisják; Fourth official: Tibor Gyarmati II

20 September 2008 8	Siófok	1–1	Rákospalota	Siófok
19:00 CEST (UTC+2)	G. Hegedűs (yellow card) 8'; M. Takács 35'; Mogyorósi (yellow card) 53'; Ndjodo (red card) 64'	Report	T. Kiss II (yellow card) 78'; Nyerges 88'	Stadium: Révész Géza utcai Stadion; Attendance: 500; Referee: Roland Veizer; Assistant referees: Gábor Erős, Tibor Vámos; Fourth official: Gábor Miráki

27 September 2008 9	Kaposvár	1–0	Siófok	Kaposvár
19:00 CEST (UTC+2)	Božović 82'	Report		Stadium: Rákóczi Stadion; Attendance: 2,500; Referee: Ferenc Bede; Assistant referees: Attila Beidek, István Iványi; Fourth official: Gábor Oláh

3 October 2008 10	Siófok	0–1	Honvéd	Siófok
19:00 CEST (UTC+2)	Tusori (yellow card) 69'	Report	Guié 37'; Filó (yellow card) 70'	Stadium: Révész Géza utcai Stadion; Attendance: 500; Referee: Tamás Bognár; Assistant referees: Zoltán Kovács, Imre Attila Nagy; Fourth official: Balázs Böcskei

18 October 2008 11	MTK	2–1	Siófok	Budapest
18:00 CEST (UTC+2)	Hrepka 85'; Rodenbücher (yellow card) 88'; Lencse 90', (yellow card) 90+1'	Report	Sütő (red card) 53'; Ndjodo 62'; Tusori (yellow card) 90+3'	Stadium: Hidegkuti Nándor Stadion; Attendance: 500; Referee: Viktor Kassai; Assistant referees: Dr. Zsolt Varga, Attila Kelemen; Fourth official: Gábor Oláh

25 October 2008 12	Siófok	4–1	Diósgyőr	Siófok
18:00 CEST (UTC+2)	Ndjodo 45', 51'; Magasföldi 46'; Mogyorósi (yellow card) 50'; Tusori 61'	Report	Miličić (yellow card) 27'; Tchana 63'; Z. Pintér (yellow card) 70'	Stadium: Révész Géza utcai Stadion; Attendance: 500; Referee: Péter Solymosi; Assistant referees: Zoltán Kis, István Iványi; Fourth official: Dávid Ákos

1 November 2008 13	Paks	2–1	Siófok	Paks
18:00 CET (UTC+1)	Böde (yellow card) 15', (goal) 56'; Hanák (yellow card) 20'; T. Kiss I 54'	Report	Tusori (yellow card) 13'; S. Kanta 36'; G. Hegedűs (yellow card) 63'; Magasföldi (yellow card) 81'; G. Horváth I (yellow card) 90'	Stadium: Fehérvári úti Stadion; Attendance: 1,200; Referee: Ferenc Bede; Assistant referees: Róbert Kispál, Zsolt Butkai; Fourth official: Dr. Ádám Szanyi

9 November 2008 14	Siófok	1–4	Zalaegerszeg	Siófok
15:00 CET (UTC+1)	Sütő 45'; G. Hegedűs (yellow card) 56'; Fülöp (yellow card) 63'	Report	Méyé 24', 71'; An. Horváth I (yellow card) 29'; Hajdú (yellow card) 41'; Waltner 46'; P. Máté I 90+3'	Stadium: Révész Géza utcai Stadion; Attendance: 400; Referee: József Berger; Assistant referees: Attila Forgács, Balázs Farkas; Fourth official: Gergely Szőts

15 November 2008 15	Győr	0–0	Siófok	Győr
18:00 CET (UTC+1)	Tokody (yellow card) 35'	Report	S. Kanta (yellow card) 89'	Stadium: ETO Park; Attendance: 1,600; Referee: Szabolcs Szilasi; Assistant referees: Tibor Vámos, Zoltán Szalai; Fourth official: Tibor Farkas

21 February 2009 16	Fehérvár	2–1	Siófok	Székesfehérvár
17:00 CET (UTC+1)	Alves 5'; Polonkai (yellow card) 32', (goal) 58'	Report	Magasföldi (yellow card) 35'; Köntös (yellow card) 53'; S. Kanta 87'	Stadium: Sóstói Stadion; Attendance: 1,314; Referee: Ferenc Bede; Assistant referees: Róbert Kispál, Tibor Vígh; Fourth official: Gergő Király

7 March 2009 18	Újpest	2–0	Siófok	Budapest
18:00 CET (UTC+1)	Rajczi (yellow card) 2', (goal) 52'; Kabát (yellow card) 63'; Dudić (yellow card) 77'; Tisza 90'	Report	Sütő (yellow card) 12'; S. Kanta (yellow card) 40'; Ribeiro (yellow card) 68'; Magasföldi (yellow card) 82'	Stadium: Szusza Ferenc Stadion; Attendance: 4,667; Referee: Roland Veizer; Assistant referees: Péter Berettyán, Attila Kelemen; Fourth official: Tibor Gyarmati II

14 March 2009 19	Vasas	0–1	Siófok	Budapest
18:00 CET (UTC+1)	Piller (yellow card) 52'	Report	Kogler 50'; Sütő (yellow card) 72'	Stadium: Illovszky Rudolf Stadion; Attendance: 3,000; Referee: Gergely Sulyok; Assistant referees: Tibor Vámos, Zoltán Szalai; Fourth official: Gábor Oláh

21 March 2009 20	Siófok	0–1	Haladás	Siófok
18:00 CET (UTC+1)	G. Horváth I (yellow card) 30'; L. Nagy (yellow card) 41'; G. Hegedűs (yellow card) 68'; Ndjodo (yellow card) 78'	Report	B. Molnár (yellow card) 34'; Vörös 90+2'	Stadium: Révész Géza utcai Stadion; Attendance: 500; Referee: Szabolcs Szilasi; Assistant referees: Oszkár Lémon, István Iványi; Fourth official: Dávid Ákos

4 April 2009 21	Debrecen	5–1	Siófok	Debrecen
19:00 CEST (UTC+2)	Oláh 16' (pen.), 77'; Mészáros 37'; Dudu 44'; Vinicius 85'	Report	S. Kanta (yellow card) 31'; G. Hegedűs (yellow card) 36'; Fomumbod (yellow card) 40'; Magasföldi 43'; Sütő (red card) 84'	Stadium: Oláh Gábor utcai Stadion; Attendance: 4,000; Referee: János Takács; Assistant referees: István Albert, Lajos L. Tóth; Fourth official: Gábor Bendik

11 April 2009 22	Siófok	2–0	Kecskemét	Siófok
19:00 CEST (UTC+2)	Magasföldi (yellow card) 23'; Kogler 42'; G. Horváth I (yellow card) 55'; Ribeiro 79'	Report	I. Farkas (yellow card) 62'; Gyagya (red card) 66'; Némedi (yellow card) 68'	Stadium: Révész Géza utcai Stadion; Attendance: 1,200; Referee: Roland Veizer; Assistant referees: Róbert Horváth, Arnold Kepe; Fourth official: Norbert Kiss

18 April 2009 23	Rákospalota	3–1	Siófok	Budapest
19:00 CEST (UTC+2)	Tusori 25' (o.g.); Z. Pintér (yellow card) 44'; Szántai (yellow card) 60'; Torma 63'; Nyerges 67' (pen.)	Report	Kogler (yellow card) 47'; G. Hegedűs (yellow card) 67'; Magasföldi 87'	Stadium: Budai II. László Stadion; Attendance: 450; Referee: Péter Solymosi; Assistant referees: Oszkár Lémon, Gábor Takács; Fourth official: Dávid Ákos

25 April 2009 24	Siófok	2–5	Kaposvár	Siófok
19:00 CEST (UTC+2)	Tusori (yellow card) 35'; Ribeiro (yellow card) 45', (goal) 75'; Magasföldi 54', (yellow card) 66'; G. Horváth I (red card) 76'	Report	Zsolnai 6', 28', 58'; Zahorecz (yellow card) 11'; Bogdán (yellow card) 50'; Nikolić 56', 90+2'; Petrók (yellow card) 63'; Grúz (yellow card) 84'	Stadium: Révész Géza utcai Stadion; Attendance: 1,200; Referee: Zoltán Iványi; Assistant referees: Vencel Tóth II, Zsolt Márton

28 April 2009 25	Honvéd	0–2	Siófok	Budapest
19:00 CEST (UTC+2)	Rabóczki (yellow card) 50'; Vukmir (yellow card) 73'	Report	Ivancsics 52' (pen.); Magasföldi 75'	Stadium: Bozsik József Stadion; Attendance: 1,000; Referee: Ádám Németh; Assistant referees: Balázs Farkas, Tibor Vígh; Fourth official: Gergő Janitz

2 May 2009 26	Siófok	0–1	MTK	Siófok
19:00 CEST (UTC+2)	Köntös (yellow card) 50'; Ribeiro (yellow card) 66'	Report	Zsidai (yellow card) 8'; Eppel (yellow card) 40'; Pátkai (yellow card) 72'; Lencse 90+1'	Stadium: Révész Géza utcai Stadion; Attendance: 600; Referee: József Berger; Assistant referees: Attila Forgács, Zoltán Kovács; Fourth official: Gyöngyi Gaál

5 May 2009 17	Siófok	3–1	Nyíregyháza	Siófok
19:00 CEST (UTC+2)	Sütő 4'; Ivancsics 38'; Magasföldi 41', (yellow card) 56'	Report	Miskolczi (yellow card) 45'; Perenyi (yellow card) 73'; Stojkov 83'	Stadium: Révész Géza utcai Stadion; Attendance: 300; Referee: Ádám Farkas; Assistant referees: Attila Kelemen, Gyula Fehér; Fourth official: László Varga
Note: The matches of the 17th round were postponed due to HFF decision.

9 May 2009 27	Diósgyőr	0–1	Siófok	Miskolc
19:00 CEST (UTC+2)	Kamber (yellow card) 33'; Menyhért (yellow card) 63'	Report	L. Nagy (yellow card) 30'; Köntös (yellow card) 55'; Ekounda 80'	Stadium: Diósgyőri Stadion; Attendance: 2,500; Referee: Roland Veizer; Assistant referees: Tibor Vígh, Róbert Horváth; Fourth official: Gábor Bendik

16 May 2009 28	Siófok	1–2	Paks	Siófok
19:00 CEST (UTC+2)	G. Hegedűs (red card) 51'; Tusori 56'	Report	Vári 5', (yellow card) 28'; L. Horváth (yellow card) 25'; Nikolov (red card) 70'; I. Nagy 83'	Stadium: Révész Géza utcai Stadion; Attendance: 800; Referee: Ferenc Bede; Assistant referees: Róbert Kispál, Vencel Tóth II; Fourth official: József Erdős

23 May 2009 29	Zalaegerszeg	5–3	Siófok	Zalaegerszeg
19:00 CEST (UTC+2)	Rudņevs 10', 44'; G. Kovács 34'; Waltner (yellow card) 58', (goal) 88'; Sluka 61'	Report	G. Horváth I 4', (yellow card) 83'; Magasföldi 37'; Kogler 79'	Stadium: ZTE Arena; Attendance: 3,000; Referee: Zsolt Szabó; Assistant referees: György Ring, Zoltán Szalai; Fourth official: Gergely Szőts

30 May 2009 30	Siófok	3–2	Győr	Siófok
19:00 CEST (UTC+2)	Bojtor 5'; Ribeiro (yellow card) 15'; Magasföldi 27'; Ivancsics (yellow card) 45'; M. Takács 56'; S. Kanta (yellow card) 64'; Tusori (yellow card) 76'	Report	Bicák (yellow card) 20'; Völgyi (yellow card) 35'; Aleksidze 65', 87'; Stark (yellow card) 81'	Stadium: Révész Géza utcai Stadion; Attendance: 200; Referee: János Takács; Assistant referees: Lajos L. Tóth, János Demeter; Fourth official: Gábor Bendik

=== Magyar Kupa ===
4 September 2008 Third round	Szentlőrinc	0–2 (a.e.t.)	Siófok	Szentlőrinc
16:00 CEST (UTC+2)		Report	Köntös (yellow card) 10'; Lipcsei (yellow card) 59', (goal) 94'; Basara 120'	Stadium: Szentlőrinci Sportpálya; Attendance: 500; Referee: Norbert Kiss; Assistant referees: Arnold Kepe, Tamás Kulman

24 September 2008 Round of 32	Rum	0–3	Siófok	Rum
15:30 CEST (UTC+2)		Report	Ladóczki 40'; Tusori 45'; László 88'	Stadium: Rumi Sportpálya; Attendance: 500; Referee: Szabolcs Szilasi; Assistant referees: Gábor Gyürüsi, Milán Mohos

==== Round of 16 ====
8 October 2008 First leg	Fehérvár II	0–4	Siófok	Felcsút
15:00 CEST (UTC+2)		Report	Ndjodo 11', 32', 37'; Basara (yellow card) 51', (goal) 65'	Stadium: Felcsút Sporttelep; Attendance: 500; Referee: Ádám Németh; Assistant referees: Zsolt Márton, István Tóth

22 October 2008 Second leg	Siófok	4–1 (8–1 agg.)	Fehérvár II	Siófok
14:00 CEST (UTC+2)	Ladóczki 5', 28'; Handler 38'; Basara 65'	Report	Disztl 52'; T. Kovács (yellow card) 76'	Stadium: Révész Géza utcai Stadion; Attendance: 150; Referee: Eszter Urbán; Assistant referees: László Varga, Gyula Fehér
Note: Siófok won 8–1 on aggregate.

==== Quarter-finals ====
10 March 2009 First leg	Siófok	2–0	Debrecen	Siófok
16:00 CET (UTC+1)	S. Kanta (yellow card) 20'; Magasföldi 20', (yellow card) 80'; Ivancsics 57'	Report	Leonardo (yellow card) 31'; Huszák (yellow card) 43'	Stadium: Révész Géza utcai Stadion; Attendance: 100; Referee: Ádám Németh; Assistant referees: Zoltán Kovács, Arnold Kepe

17 March 2009 Second leg	Debrecen	1–1 (1–3 agg.)	Siófok	Debrecen
17:00 CET (UTC+1)	Huszák (yellow card) 6'; Leandro (yellow card) 36'; Dudu 49'	Report	Ndjodo (yellow card) 11'; G. Hegedűs (yellow card) 20'; Magasföldi (yellow card) 25'; Ivancsics 45' (pen.); Sütő (yellow card) 57'; Koós (yellow card) 88'	Stadium: Oláh Gábor utcai Stadion; Attendance: 2,000; Referee: Ferenc Bede; Assistant referees: Róbert Kispál, György Ring
Note: Siófok won 3–1 on aggregate.

==== Semi-finals ====
15 April 2009 First leg	Siófok	1–2	Honvéd	Siófok
18:00 CEST (UTC+2)	Hercegfalvi 6' (o.g.); Hegedűs (yellow card) 33'; G. Horváth I (yellow card) 67'; Magasföldi (yellow card) 77'; Andruskó (yellow card) 90+2'; Sütő (yellow card) 90+2'	Report	Smiljanić (yellow card) 1'; Filó (yellow card) 7'; Vukmir (yellow card) 47'; Lungu (yellow card) 51'; Moreira 75'; Guié 78'	Stadium: Révész Géza utcai Stadion; Attendance: 1,500; Referee: Sándor Andó-Szabó; Assistant referees: Tibor Vámos, Zsolt Butkai

21 April 2009 Second leg	Honvéd	2–2 (4–3 agg.)	Siófok	Budapest
18:00 CEST (UTC+2)	Filó (yellow card) 22'; Smiljanić 43'; Debreceni (yellow card) 67'; Hercegfalvi 90+1'	Report	G. Horváth I (yellow card) 17'; Sütő (yellow card) 28'; G. Hegedűs 49', (yellow card) 53'; Ivancsics 74'; L. Nagy (red card) 83'	Stadium: Bozsik József Stadion; Attendance: 1,500; Referee: Ferenc Bede; Assistant referees: Róbert Kispál, György Ring
Note: Honvéd won 4–3 on aggregate.

=== Ligakupa ===
==== Group stage ====
Pos	Team	Pld	W	D	L	GF	GA	GD	Pts	Qualification	HAL	GYO	MTK	SIO	BUD	PAP
1	Haladás	10	7	1	2	23	10	+13	22	Advance to knockout phase	—	2–0	2–0	3–0	3–0	5–2
2	Győr	10	5	1	4	23	19	+4	16	Advance to knockout phase	4–0	—	1–1	3–0	6–0	0–4
3	MTK	10	4	3	3	13	17	−4	15		0–0	3–0	—	1–8	1–2	2–1
4	Siófok	10	4	2	4	20	16	+4	14		2–1	4–2	1–2	—	1–2	2–2
5	Budaörs	10	3	1	6	10	22	−12	10		2–5	0–1	0–1	0–2	—	3–1
6	Pápa	10	1	4	5	18	23	−5	7		0–2	5–6	2–2	0–0	1–1	—

Source: HFF

1 October 2008 1	Siófok	1–2	Budaörs	Siófok
15:30 CEST (UTC+2)	Krizbai 23'	Report	Végh (yellow card) 53'; Pálinkás 59'; Tüske 78'	Stadium: Révész Géza utcai Stadion; Attendance: 50; Referee: József Erdős; Assistant referees: Tibor Gyarmati II, Zsolt Márton

15 October 2008 2	MTK	1–8	Siófok	Budapest
15:00 CEST (UTC+2)	Nikházi 72'	Report	M. Takács 4'; Magasföldi 35', 41'; Ndjodo 44'; Fülöp 49', 80'; Gajda 52', 75'	Stadium: Hidegkuti Nándor Stadion; Attendance: 150; Referee: Gergely Szőts; Assistant referees: Gábor Takács, Gábor Gyürüsi

12 November 2008 5	Győr	3–0	Siófok	Győr
13:30 CET (UTC+1)	A. Pintér (yellow card) 40'; M. Kiss (yellow card) 42'; Csermelyi 61'; Fomumbod 73'; Brnović 80'; Zo. Kovács II (yellow card) 83'	Report	Sütő (red card) 85'	Stadium: ETO Park; Attendance: 300; Referee: Tamás Bognár; Assistant referees: Zoltán Kovács, Balázs Huszár

19 November 2008 4	Siófok	2–1	Haladás	Siófok
13:00 CET (UTC+1)	Magasföldi 32'; Ndjodo 44'; Tusori (yellow card) 90'	Report	Andorka 24'; Zs. Kovács (yellow card) 40'	Stadium: Révész Géza utcai Stadion; Attendance: 100; Referee: Ádám Németh; Assistant referees: Gergő Janitz, Ferenc Varga

22 November 2008 6	Budaörs	0–2	Siófok	Budaörs
13:00 CET (UTC+1)	Bálint (yellow card) 89'	Report	Magasföldi 67'; Forgács 90+2'	Stadium: Árok utcai Stadion; Attendance: 100; Referee: János Takács; Assistant referees: Gábor Bendik, Lajos L. Tóth

26 November 2008 3	Siófok	2–2	Pápa	Siófok
13:00 CET (UTC+1)	Forgács 33'; Magasföldi 43'	Report	Gyömbér 36'; Venczel (yellow card) 43'; G. Varga (yellow card) 50'; Szabó 66'; Császár (yellow card) 80'	Stadium: Csárdaréti út Attendance: 150; Referee: Norbert Kiss; Assistant referees: Szabolcs Deutsch, Arnold Kepe

29 November 2008 7	Siófok	1–2	MTK	Siófok
13:00 CET (UTC+1)	Tusori 57'	Report	M. Molnár (yellow card) 16'; Rodenbücher 50'; Kis 70'	Stadium: Csárdaréti út Attendance: 150; Referee: József Berger; Assistant referees: Attila Forgács, László Sebestyén

6 December 2008 8	Pápa	0–0	Siófok	Pápa
13:00 CET (UTC+1)		Report	G. Hegedűs (yellow card) 20'; Mogyorósi (yellow card) 71'; S. Kanta (yellow card) 86'	Stadium: Perutz Stadion; Attendance: 300; Referee: Gábor Oláh; Assistant referees: Zoltán Szalai, Gábor Varga Jr.

7 February 2009 9	Haladás	3–0	Siófok	Szombathely
13:30 CET (UTC+1)	An. Simon II 23', 90'; Maikel (yellow card) 60'; Rácz 73'	Report	Hollósi (yellow card) 23'	Stadium: Illés Akadémia műfüves pálya Attendance: 200; Referee: Gábor Oláh; Assistant referees: Balázs Farkas, Andrea Hima

14 February 2009 10	Siófok	4–2	Győr	Siófok
13:00 CET (UTC+1)	Ndjodo 31'; Tóth 53' (o.g.); Magasföldi 54', (yellow card) 61'; Sütő (yellow card) 56'; Andruskó (yellow card) 70'; Koós 83'	Report	Csermelyi (yellow card) 8', (goal) 16'; Berde 27'; P. Molnár (yellow card) 54'; Pákolicz (yellow card) 81'	Stadium: Révész Géza utcai Stadion; Attendance: 150; Referee: Gyöngyi Gaál; Assistant referees: Tibor Vámos, Ferenc Varga
