= 2007–08 BFC Siófok season =

Siófok
2007–08 season
- Manager: Antal Botos (until October); Barnabás Tornyi (from October to January); Aldo Dolcetti (from January)
- Stadium: Révész Géza utcai Stadion
- Nemzeti Bajnokság I: 14th
- Magyar Kupa: Third round
- Ligakupa: Autumn season: Group stage Spring season: Semi-finals

The 2007–08 season was Bodajk Futball Club Siófok's 17th competitive season, 76th year in existence as a football club, and first season in the Nemzeti Bajnokság I after being promoted from the second level the previous season. In addition to the domestic league, Siófok participated in that season's editions of the Magyar Kupa and the Ligakupa.

== Squad ==
Note: Flags indicate national team as defined under FIFA eligibility rules; some limited exceptions apply. Players may hold more than one non-FIFA nationality.

No.	Pos.	Nation	Player
1	GK	HUN	Lajos Hegedűs
2	DF	HUN	Sándor Ambrus
3	DF	HUN	András László
4	DF	HUN	András Forgács
5	DF	HUN	László Sütő
6	DF	HUN	Richárd Tusori
7	MF	HUN	István Csopaki
8	MF	HUN	Lajos Nagy
9	MF	HUN	Gábriel Homonyik
10	FW	HUN	István Gajda
11	MF	HUN	Szabolcs Kanta
13	MF	BIH	Marko Basara
14	DF	ROU	Adrian Dan Găman
15	FW	HUN	Zoltán Fülöp

No.	Pos.	Nation	Player
16	FW	HUN	Bence Horváth
17	MF	HUN	Vilmos Melczer
18	FW	HUN	Ákos Kozmor
19	DF	HUN	Dániel Köntös
20	DF	HUN	János Miklósvári
21	DF	SRB	Igor Popović
22	GK	ROU	András Sánta
24	MF	HUN	Attila Horváth
25	FW	HUN	József Magasföldi
26	GK	HUN	Milán Balikó
—	MF	HUN	Péter Bonifert
—	DF	HUN	Zsolt Csóka
—	MF	HUN	Zsolt Müller

== Competitions ==
=== Overview ===
Competition	First match	Last match	Starting round	Final position	Record							
Competition	First match	Last match	Starting round	Final position	Pld	W	D	L	GF	GA	GD	Win %
Nemzeti Bajnokság I	21 July 2007	1 June 2008	Matchday 1	14th	30	6	9	15	33	46	−13	20.00
Magyar Kupa	29 August 2007	29 August 2007	Third round	Third round	1	0	1	0	2	2	+0	0.00
Ligakupa (Autumn season)	15 August 2007	10 October 2007	Group stage	Group stage	6	2	1	3	9	12	−3	33.33
Ligakupa (Spring season)	1 December 2007	23 April 2008	Group stage	Semi-finals	10	4	2	4	17	15	+2	40.00
Total					47	12	13	22	61	75	−14	25.53

Source: Competitions

=== Nemzeti Bajnokság I ===
==== League table ====
Pos	Team	Pld	W	D	L	GF	GA	GD	Pts	Qualification or relegation
12	Rákospalota	30	7	9	14	42	60	−18	30	
13	Diósgyőr	30	5	13	12	43	63	−20	28	
14	Siófok	30	6	9	15	33	46	−13	27	
15	Tatabánya (R)	30	2	4	24	34	93	−59	10	Relegation to Nemzeti Bajnokság II
16	Sopron (Note: FC Sopron couldn't finish the 2007–08 season, because of bankruptcy. All remaining matches will be counted as won for their opponents.) (D)	30	2	5	23	10	73	−63	0	Exclution and Dissolution

Source: soccerway.com
(D) Disqualified; (R) Relegated

==== Results summary ====
Overall								Home						Away					
Pld	W	D	L	GF	GA	GD	Pts	W	D	L	GF	GA	GD	W	D	L	GF	GA	GD
30	6	9	15	33	46	−13	27	5	4	6	20	17	+3	1	5	9	13	29	−16

Source: Hungarian Football Federation

==== Results by round ====
Round	1	2	3	4	5	6	7	8	9	10	11	12	13	14	15	16	17	18	19	20	21	22	23	24	25	26	27	28	29	30
Ground	H	A	H	H	A	H	A	H	A	H	A	H	A	H	A	A	H	A	A	H	A	H	A	H	A	H	A	H	A	H
Result	L	W	D	L	L	D	L	L	D	L	D	W	D	W	D	L	W	L	L	D	L	L	D	L	L	W	L	W	L	D
Position	11	7	9	11	12	12	13	13	13	13	14	14	14	10	10	12	11	11	11	11	14	14	14	14	14	14	14	14	14	14

Source: Matches
A = Away; H = Home; W = Win; D = Draw; L = Loss

==== Matches ====
21 July 2007 1	Siófok	2–4	Újpest	Siófok
	Tusori 3'; Homonyik 21'	Report	Kéthévoama 51'; O. Nagy 77'; Rajczi 79', 90+6'	Stadium: Révész Géza utcai Stadion; Referee: Zsolt Szabó

28 July 2007 2	Diósgyőr	0–3	Siófok	Miskolc
		Report	Kuttor 7'; Fülöp 48', 65'	Stadium: Diósgyőri Stadion; Referee: Szabolcs Szilasi

3 August 2007 3	Siófok	1–1	Debrecen	Siófok
	Melczer 19'	Report	Rudolf 35'	Stadium: Révész Géza utcai Stadion; Referee: Ferenc Bede

11 August 2007 4	Siófok	0–1	Győr	Siófok
		Report	Stark 56'	Stadium: Révész Géza utcai Stadion; Referee: Sándor Andó-Szabó

18 August 2007 5	Zalaegerszeg	2–0	Siófok	Zalaegerszeg
	Waltner 51', 68'	Report	Tusori (yellow card) 66'; Fomumbod (yellow card) 89'	Stadium: ZTE Arena; Referee: József Berger

25 August 2007 6	Siófok	1–1	MTK	Siófok
	Fülöp 27'	Report	J. Kanta 68'	Stadium: Révész Géza utcai Stadion; Referee: Csaba Imre Sápi

1 September 2007 7	Kaposvár	4–3	Siófok	Kaposvár
	Alves 1', 40'; Oláh 45'; Vasiljević 69'	Report	Kuttor 32'; Fülöp 48', 62'	Stadium: Rákóczi Stadion; Referee: Mihály Fábián

15 September 2007 8	Siófok	1–2	Honvéd	Siófok
	S. Kanta 43'	Report	Palásthy 71'; Dieng 72'	Stadium: Révész Géza utcai Stadion; Referee: Péter Solymosi

24 September 2007 9	Vasas	0–0	Siófok	Budapest
		Report		Stadium: Illovszky Rudolf Stadion; Referee: Zsolt Szabó

29 September 2007 10	Siófok	0–1	Nyíregyháza	Siófok
		Report	N. Szilágyi 12'	Stadium: Révész Géza utcai Stadion; Referee: Roland Veizer

6 October 2007 11	Tatabánya	2–2	Siófok	Tatabánya
	Hajdú 12'; I. Sándor 60'	Report	Lakić 47'; Fülöp 84'	Stadium: Stadion Városi; Referee: Tamás Bognár

20 October 2007 12	Siófok	1–0	Rákospalota	Siófok
	S. Kanta 78'	Report		Stadium: Révész Géza utcai Stadion; Attendance: 1,200; Referee: Gergely Sulyok

3 November 2007 13	Sopron	0–0	Siófok	Sopron
		Report		Stadium: Stadion Városi; Referee: Zsolt Szabó

10 November 2007 14	Siófok	1–0	Fehérvár	Siófok
	Gajda 90'	Report		Stadium: Révész Géza utcai Stadion; Referee: József Berger

24 November 2007 15	Paks	1–1	Siófok	Paks
	Tököli 57'	Report	S. Kanta 56'	Stadium: Fehérvári úti Stadion; Referee: Ferenc Bede

23 February 2008 16	Újpest	3–0	Siófok	Budapest
	Dourandi 13', 55'; Moldovan 84'	Report		Stadium: Szusza Ferenc Stadion; Referee: Mihály Fábián

1 March 2008 17	Siófok	4–0	Diósgyőr	Siófok
	Magasföldi 25', 64'; Bonifert 75'; Melczer 89'	Report		Stadium: Révész Géza utcai Stadion; Referee: Sándor Andó-Szabó

10 March 2008 18	Debrecen	2–0	Siófok	Debrecen
	Kouemaha 27'; Czvitkovics 67'	Report		Stadium: Oláh Gábor utcai Stadion; Referee: József Berger

15 March 2008 19	Győr	4–1	Siófok	Győr
	Völgyi 26'; Dudás 52'; Koltai 65'; Brnović 90+2'	Report	Csopaki 53'	Stadium: ETO Park; Referee: Csaba Imre Sápi

22 March 2008 20	Siófok	1–1	Zalaegerszeg	Siófok
	Magasföldi 85'	Report	P. Máté I (yellow card) 49'; Waltner 71'; Miljatovič (yellow card) 80'	Stadium: Révész Géza utcai Stadion; Referee: Zoltán Iványi

29 March 2008 21	MTK	3–0	Siófok	Budapest
	Urbán 23', 77'; Lambulić 56'	Report		Stadium: Hidegkuti Nándor Stadion; Referee: Szabolcs Szilasi

5 April 2008 22	Siófok	0–2	Kaposvár	Siófok
		Report	Oláh 41'; Grúz 86'	Stadium: Révész Géza utcai Stadion; Referee: Ádám Németh

12 April 2008 23	Honvéd	1–1	Siófok	Budapest
	Dieng 81'	Report	Miklósvári 4'	Stadium: Bozsik József Stadion; Referee: Viktor Kassai

19 April 2008 24	Siófok	1–3	Vasas	Siófok
	Gajda 72'	Report	N. Németh 1', 13'; Lázok 77'	Stadium: Révész Géza utcai Stadion; Referee: Krisztián Király

26 April 2008 25	Nyíregyháza	2–0	Siófok	Nyíregyháza
	Dosso 10'; Miskolczi 42'	Report		Stadium: Városi Stadion; Referee: Zoltán Iványi

3 May 2008 26	Siófok	3–0	Tatabánya	Siófok
	Bonifert 29'; Magasföldi 34', 78'	Report		Stadium: Révész Géza utcai Stadion; Referee: Roland Veizer

10 May 2008 27	Rákospalota	4–2	Siófok	Sopron (Note: The match was played at the Stadion Városi in Sopron, instead of REAC regular stadium, the Budai II. László Stadion in Budapest, which did not meet HFF requirements.)
	Somorjai 1'; Torma 45', 52', 64'; G. Horváth (yellow card) 55'; Zana (yellow card) 71'	Report	Melczer 48'; Magasföldi 76', (yellow card) 86'; László (yellow card) 85'	Stadium: Stadion Városi; Attendance: 600; Referee: Péter Solymosi

17 May 2008 28	Siófok	3–0 (Awarded)	Sopron	Siófok
		Report		Stadium: Révész Géza utcai Stadion
Note: After the exclusion of Sopron, the matches were registered with a goal difference of 3–0.

25 May 2008 29	Fehérvár	1–0	Siófok	Székesfehérvár
	D. Nagy 76'	Report		Stadium: Sóstói Stadion; Referee: Viktor Kassai

1 June 2008 30	Siófok	1–1	Paks	Siófok
	Melczer 36'	Report	Tamási 30'	Stadium: Révész Géza utcai Stadion; Referee: Mihály Fábián

=== Magyar Kupa ===
29 August 2007 Third round	Szekszárd	2–2	Siófok	Szekszárd
	B. Hencz 62' (pen.); N. Csóti 90+1'	Report	Melczer 29'; Forgács 33'	Stadium: Városi Stadion; Attendance: 600; Referee: Gábor Oláh
Note: Szekszárd won as lower division team.

=== Ligakupa ===
==== Autumn season ====
===== Group stage =====
Pos	Team	Pld	W	D	L	GF	GA	GD	Pts	Qualification	ZAL	RAK	SIO	KAP
1	Zalaegerszeg	6	5	1	0	18	7	+11	16	Advance to knockout phase	—	3–1	4–0	1–1
2	Rákospalota	6	2	2	2	14	12	+2	8	Advance to knockout phase	3–5	—	2–0	5–1
3	Siófok	6	2	1	3	9	12	−3	7		2–3	1–1	—	4–1
4	Kaposvár	6	0	2	4	6	16	−10	2		0–2	2–2	1–2	—

Source: HFF

15 August 2007 1	Siófok	1–1	Rákospalota	Siófok
19:00 CEST (UTC+2)	Homonyik 68'; Miklósvári (yellow card) 87'	Report	B. Kovács (yellow card) 24'; G. Horváth (yellow card) 51'; T. Kiss 89'	Stadium: Révész Géza utcai Stadion; Attendance: 1,000; Referee: Roland Veizer

23 August 2007 2	Zalaegerszeg	4–0	Siófok	Zalaegerszeg
20:30 CEST (UTC+2)	Balázs 26'; A. Horváth (yellow card) 61', (goal) 79'; T. Molnár 67'; Majoros 70'; Sági (yellow card) 90'	Report	Sütő (yellow card) 57'; Kozmor (yellow card) 74'	Stadium: ZTE Arena; Attendance: 800; Referee: Péter Solymosi

9 September 2007 3	Kaposvár	1–2	Siófok	Kaposvár
19:00 CEST (UTC+2)	Balogh 79'	Report	Lipcsei 16'; Z. Fülöp 73'	Stadium: Rákóczi Stadion; Referee: Szabolcs Szilasi

19 September 2007 4	Siófok	4–1	Kaposvár	Siófok
16:30 CEST (UTC+2)	Z. Fülöp 16'; Homonyik 28'; S. Kanta 55'; László 70'	Report	Reszli 40'	Stadium: Révész Géza utcai Stadion; Referee: Csaba Pintér

3 October 2007 5	Rákospalota	2–0	Siófok	Budapest
15:00 CEST (UTC+2)	T. Nagy 13', (yellow card) 45'; Rása (yellow card) 43'; F. Matondo 46', (yellow card) 46'	Report	Köntös (yellow card) 55'; Csopaki (yellow card) 78'; Miklósvári (yellow card) 90'	Stadium: Stadion Budai II. Laszló; Attendance: 100; Referee: Ferenc Bede

10 October 2007 6	Siófok	2–3	Zalaegerszeg	Siófok
15:00 CEST (UTC+2)	Forgács (yellow card) 23'; Homonyik (yellow card) 63'; Fülöp 78', 84'	Report	Sági 14'; Botiș (yellow card) 54'; Simonfalvi 70'; Fülöp (yellow card) 82'; Balázs 86'	Stadium: Révész Géza utcai Stadion; Attendance: 100; Referee: József Erdős

==== Spring season ====
===== Group stage =====
Pos	Team	Pld	W	D	L	GF	GA	GD	Pts	Qualification	PAK	SIO	KAP	FEH
1	Paks	6	5	0	1	16	10	+6	15	Advance to knockout phase	—	3–0	2–1	3–1
2	Siófok	6	3	0	3	15	13	+2	9	Advance to knockout phase	4–2	—	1–2	4–2
3	Kaposvár	6	3	0	3	11	11	0	9		4–5	2–1	—	2–0
4	Fehérvár	6	1	0	5	7	15	−8	3		0–1	2–5	2–0	—

Source: HFF

1 December 2007 1	Siófok	1–2	Kaposvár	Kaposvár
13:00 CET (UTC+1)	Forgács 40'	Report	da Silva 48'; Szakály 60'	Stadium: Cseri úti Sporttelep; Referee: Tamás Bognár

5 December 2007 2	Fehérvár	2–5	Siófok	Székesfehérvár
14:00 CET (UTC+1)	Disztl 39', 49'	Report	Gajda 3'; S. Kanta 17'; Miklósvári 23', 75'; Melczer 72'	Stadium: Sóstói Stadion; Attendance: 150; Referee: Szabolcs Szilasi

8 December 2007 3	Siófok	4–2	Paks	Székesfehérvár
11:00 CET (UTC+1)	Fülöp 24'; Kozmor 67'; Z. Molnár 79' (o.g.); Csopaki 85'	Report	Heffler 14'; T. Kiss 28'	Stadium: Sóstói Stadion; Referee: Zoltán Iványi

16 February 2008 4	Paks	3–0	Siófok	Paks
14:00 CET (UTC+1)	T. Kiss 13'; Balaskó 36'; Belényesi 90'	Report		Stadium: ASE Sporttelep; Referee: István Vad

20 February 2008 5	Kaposvár	2–1	Siófok	Kaposvár
14:00 CET (UTC+1)	Nikolić 29', 38'	Report	Forgács 89'	Stadium: Rákóczi Stadion; Referee: Ádám Németh

27 February 2008 6	Siófok	4–2	Fehérvár	Siófok
14:00 CET (UTC+1)	Sütő 9'; Gajda 22'; Magasföldi 34'; Miklósvári 66'	Report	Csobánki 61', 81'	Stadium: Révész Géza utcai Stadion; Referee: Csaba Pintér

===== Knockout phase =====
====== Quarter-finals ======
5 March 2008 First leg	Siófok	2–0	Zalaegerszeg	Siófok
	B. Horváth 48'; Basara 84'	Report	Rácz (yellow card) 90'	Stadium: Révész Géza utcai Stadion; Attendance: 250; Referee: Szabolcs Szilasi

12 March 2008 Second leg	Zalaegerszeg	0–0 (0–2 agg.)	Siófok	Zalaegerszeg
	Balázs (yellow card) 27'; Z. Tóth (yellow card) 45'; Rácz (yellow card) 60'	Report		Stadium: ZTE Arena; Attendance: 500; Referee: Tamás Bognár
Note: Siófok won 2–0 on aggregate.

====== Semi-finals ======
16 April 2008 First leg	Debrecen	2–0	Siófok	Debrecen
	Chigou 8', 28'	Report		Stadium: Oláh Gábor utcai Stadion; Referee: István Vad

23 April 2008 Second leg	Siófok	0–0 (0–2 agg.)	Debrecen	Siófok
		Report		Stadium: Révész Géza utcai Stadion; Referee: Hawla Hussein
Note: Debrecen won 2–0 on aggregate.
