= 2007–08 Ligakupa =

Tournament details
- Country: Hungary
- Dates: 8 August 2007 – 20 May 2008
- Teams: 16

Final positions
- Champions: Fehérvár (1st title)
- Runners-up: Debrecen

Tournament statistics
- Matches played: 123
- Goals scored: 425 (3.46 per match)

The 2007–08 Ligakupa was the first edition of the Hungarian League Cup, the Ligakupa.

The competition was won by autumn season winner's Fehérvár, defeating the spring season winner's Debrecen with an aggregate result of 3–0 in the final. The winner qualify for the 2008 UEFA Intertoto Cup. The Székesfehérvár club later withdrew from the European club competition and the right to play was passed to Honvéd.

Match times up to 28 October 2007 and from 30 March 2008 were CEST (UTC+2). Times on interim ("winter") days were CET (UTC+1).

== Format ==
The newly created competition started with the 16 top tier teams first, grouping them by regional considerations. The top two finishers from each group will advance to the quarter-finals, which will be played on a back-and-forth basis after a draw. The semi-finals and final of the autumn season will also be two-legged. The series will be repeated in the spring after a new draw. Finally, the autumn and spring winners will face each other - twice - to decide the League Cup winners. If the same team wins in both the autumn and spring season, a friendly against the Hungarian national football team will be held instead of the Grand final.

== Autumn season ==
=== Group stage ===
==== Group A ====
Pos	Team	Pld	W	D	L	GF	GA	GD	Pts	Qualification	FEH	UJP	HON	PAK
1	Fehérvár	6	3	1	2	15	9	+6	10	Advance to knockout phase	—	3–0	2–2	3–1
2	Újpest	6	3	1	2	15	14	+1	10	Advance to knockout phase	4–3	—	4–5	4–1
3	Honvéd	6	2	2	2	12	16	−4	8		0–3	1–1	—	4–2
4	Paks	6	2	0	4	11	14	−3	6		2–1	1–2	4–0	—

Source: HFF

===== First round =====
8 August 2007	Honvéd	4–2	Paks	Budapest
19:30	Debreceni 24'; Palásthy 29'; Magasföldi 71'; Bárányos 79'	Report	Báló 27'; Brukner 73'	Stadium: Bozsik József Stadion; Attendance: 700; Referee: Szabolcs Szilasi

15 August 2007	Fehérvár	3–0	Újpest	Székesfehérvár
19:00	G. Horváth 7'; Vayer 66'; Dvéri 87'	Report		Stadium: Sóstói Stadion; Attendance: 1,000; Referee: Zsolt Szabó

===== Second round =====
22 August 2007	Paks	2–1	Fehérvár	Paks
16:00	Fehér 47' (o.g.); S. Horváth 49'	Report	Fehér 80'	Stadium: Fehérvári úti Stadion; Referee: Sándor Andó-Szabó

22 August 2007	Újpest	4–5	Honvéd	Budapest
16:00	Tisza 3'; Rajczi 12'; Széki 61'; Roiha 86'	Report	B. Tóth 41'; Dieng 47', 54'; Debreceni 88'; M. Tóth 90+2'	Stadium: Ferenc Szusza Stadium; Referee: Csaba Imre Sápi

===== Third round =====
9 September 2007	Újpest	4–1	Paks	Budapest
19:00	Salamon 23' (o.g.); Sándor 30'; Dourandi 62'; Tisza 81'	Report	Tököli 27'	Stadium: Ferenc Szusza Stadium; Referee: Gergely Sulyok

9 September 2007	Fehérvár	2–2	Honvéd	Székesfehérvár
19:00	Simek 15'; Sitku 89'	Report	Dieng 42'; Bárányos 61'	Stadium: Sóstói Stadion; Referee: Zsolt Szabó

===== Fourth round =====
18 September 2007	Honvéd	0–3	Fehérvár	Budapest
18:00		Report	Dajić 49'; Kocsis 67'; Farkas 89'	Stadium: Bozsik József Stadion; Referee: József Berger

19 September 2007	Paks	1–2	Újpest	Paks
16:00	Tamási 44'	Report	Do-kweon 40'; Dourandi 67'	Stadium: Fehérvári úti Stadion; Attendance: 300; Referee: József Erdős

===== Fifth round =====
2 October 2007	Újpest	4–3	Fehérvár	Budapest
17:00	Kéthévoama 50'; Dourandi 64'; Tisza 67'; Z. Kovács 82'	Report	Dajić 22', 90'; Božić 44'	Stadium: Ferenc Szusza Stadium; Attendance: 1,000; Referee: István Vad

3 October 2007	Paks	4–0	Honvéd	Paks
15:00	Márkus 9', 20', 56'; Báló 41'	Report		Stadium: Fehérvári úti Stadion; Attendance: 300; Referee: Norbert Kiss

===== Sixth round =====
9 October 2007	Fehérvár	3–1	Paks	Székesfehérvár
17:00	Kocsis 6'; Farkas 65'; Sitku 83'	Report	Balaskó 21'	Stadium: Sóstói Stadion; Attendance: 243; Referee: Ferenc Bede

10 October 2007	Honvéd	1–1	Újpest	Budapest
18:00	Smiljanić 58'	Report	Dourandi 89'	Stadium: Bozsik József Stadion; Attendance: 1,000; Referee: Csaba Imre Sápi

==== Group B ====
Pos	Team	Pld	W	D	L	GF	GA	GD	Pts	Qualification	ZAL	RAK	SIO	KAP
1	Zalaegerszeg	6	5	1	0	18	7	+11	16	Advance to knockout phase	—	3–1	4–0	1–1
2	Rákospalota	6	2	2	2	14	12	+2	8	Advance to knockout phase	3–5	—	2–0	5–1
3	Siófok	6	2	1	3	9	12	−3	7		2–3	1–1	—	4–1
4	Kaposvár	6	0	2	4	6	16	−10	2		0–2	2–2	1–2	—

Source: HFF

===== First round =====
15 August 2007	Kaposvár	0–2	Zalaegerszeg	Kaposvár
19:00		Report	Lukács 29'; T. Molnár 73'	Stadium: Stadion Rákóczi; Attendance: 1,000; Referee: Tamás Bognár

15 September 2007	Siófok	1–1	Rákospalota	Siófok
19:00	Homonyik 68'	Report	T. Kiss 89'	Stadium: Révész Street Stadium; Attendance: 1,000; Referee: Roland Veizer

===== Second round =====
22 August 2007	Rákospalota	5–1	Kaposvár	Budapest
16:00	Délczeg 10'; Dinka 29'; Kőhalmi 31'; T. Kiss 55'; G. Horváth 76'	Report	Suljic 22'	Stadium: Stadion Budai II. Laszló; Referee: Krisztián Pánczél

23 August 2007	Zalaegerszeg	4–0	Siófok	Zalaegerszeg
20:30	Balázs 26'; T. Molnár 67'; Majoros 70'; A. Horváth 79'	Report		Stadium: ZTE Arena; Attendance: 800; Referee: Péter Solymosi

===== Third round =====
9 September 2007	Zalaegerszeg	3–1	Rákospalota	Zalaegerszeg
19:00	Waltner 18'; Méyé 28'; N. Tóth 70'	Report	Nyerges 33'	Stadium: ZTE Arena; Referee: István Mészáros

9 September 2007	Kaposvár	1–2	Siófok	Kaposvár
19:00	Balogh 79'	Report	Lipcsei 16'; Z. Fülöp 73'	Stadium: Stadion Rákóczi; Referee: Szabolcs Szilasi

===== Fourth round =====
19 September 2007	Rákospalota	3–5	Zalaegerszeg	Budapest
16:00	Kőhalmi 14'; Matondo 18'; Délczeg 32'	Report	Diawara 47', 67'; T. Fülöp 60'; Máté 68' (pen.); Sági 88'	Stadium: Stadion Budai II. Laszló; Attendance: 250; Referee: Sándor Andó-Szabó

19 September 2007	Siófok	4–1	Kaposvár	Siófok
16:30	Z. Fülöp 16'; Homonyik 28'; S. Kanta 55'; László 70'	Report	Reszli 40'	Stadium: Révész Street Stadium; Attendance: 100; Referee: Csaba Pintér

===== Fifth round =====
3 October 2007	Rákospalota	2–0	Siófok	Budapest
15:00	T. Nagy 13'; Matondo 46'	Report		Stadium: Stadion Budai II. Laszló; Attendance: 100; Referee: Ferenc Bede

3 October 2007	Zalaegerszeg	1–1	Kaposvár	Zalaegerszeg
18:00	Lukács 81'	Report	Suljic 77'	Stadium: ZTE Arena; Attendance: 800; Referee: Krisztián Király

===== Sixth round =====
10 October 2007	Siófok	2–3	Zalaegerszeg	Siófok
15:00	Fülöp 78', 84'	Report	Sági 14'; Simonfalvi 70'; Balázs 86'	Stadium: Révész Street Stadium; Attendance: 100; Referee: József Erdős

10 October 2007	Kaposvár	2–2	Rákospalota	Kaposvár
18:00	Farkas 43'; Reszli 64'	Report	Matondo 19'; T. Kiss 70'	Stadium: Stadion Rákóczi; Attendance: 200; Referee: Tamás Bognár

==== Group C ====
Pos	Team	Pld	W	D	L	GF	GA	GD	Pts	Qualification	DEB	DIO	NYI	VAS
1	Debrecen	6	3	2	1	10	6	+4	11	Advance to knockout phase	—	1–1	3–2	3–0
2	Diósgyőr	6	3	1	2	6	6	0	10	Advance to knockout phase	2–0	—	1–0	2–1
3	Nyíregyháza	6	3	0	3	8	6	+2	9		0–2	1–0	—	4–0
4	Vasas	6	1	1	4	5	11	−6	4		1–1	3–0	0–1	—

Source: HFF

===== First round =====
15 August 2007	Nyíregyháza	4–0	Vasas	Nyíregyháza
17:00	Menougong 3', 48', 64'; N. Szilágyi 20'	Report		Stadium: Városi Stadion; Attendance: 2,000; Referee: József Berger

15 August 2007	Diósgyőr	2–0	Debrecen	Miskolc
19:00	Simon 60'; Lipusz 86'	Report		Stadium: Diósgyőri Stadion; Attendance: 1,500; Referee: Péter Solymosi

===== Second round =====
22 August 2007	Vasas	3–0	Diósgyőr	Budapest
16:00	Rebryk 6'; Skita 14'; Bükszegi 24'	Report		Stadium: Stadion Rudolf Illovszky; Referee: József Erdős

22 August 2007	Debrecen	3–2	Nyíregyháza	Debrecen
16:00	Zsolnai 28'; Kerekes 41'; Dombi 68'	Report	Moldovan 58'; Cséke 83'	Stadium: Stadion Oláh Gábor Út; Referee: Zoltán Iványi

===== Third round =====
9 September 2007	Debrecen	3–0	Vasas	Debrecen
18:00	Kerekes 54'; Sidibe 60'; Z. Takács 80'	Report		Stadium: Stadion Oláh Gábor Út; Referee: Mihály Fábián

9 September 2007	Diósgyőr	1–0	Nyíregyháza	Miskolc
19:00	Ebala 68'	Report		Stadium: Diósgyőri Stadion; Referee: Krisztián Pánczél

===== Fourth round =====
19 September 2007	Nyíregyháza	1–0	Diósgyőr	Nyíregyháza
16:00	Moldovan 41'	Report		Stadium: Városi Stadion; Attendance: 1,200; Referee: Ádám Németh

19 September 2007	Vasas	1–1	Debrecen	Budapest
19:00	Mundi 22'	Report	Kouemaha 76'	Stadium: Stadion Rudolf Illovszky; Attendance: 200; Referee: Péter Solymosi

===== Fifth round =====
3 October 2007	Vasas	0–1	Nyíregyháza	Budapest
17:00		Report	Rojas 74'	Stadium: Stadion Rudolf Illovszky; Attendance: 500; Referee: Tamás Arany

3 October 2007	Debrecen	1–1	Diósgyőr	Debrecen
18:00	Kouemaha 61'	Report	N'Gam 43'	Stadium: Stadion Oláh Gábor Út; Attendance: 1,500; Referee: Gergely Sulyok

===== Sixth round =====
10 October 2007	Nyíregyháza	0–2	Debrecen	Nyíregyháza
15:00		Report	Sidibe 6'; Kouemaha 64'	Stadium: Városi Stadion; Attendance: 2,500; Referee: Zsolt Szabó

10 October 2007	Diósgyőr	2–1	Vasas	Miskolc
18:00	Ebala 39'; Bessong 43'	Report	Sowunmi 21'	Stadium: Diósgyőri Stadion; Attendance: 1,800; Referee: Zoltán Iványi

==== Group D ====
Pos	Team	Pld	W	D	L	GF	GA	GD	Pts	Qualification	GYO	TAT	MTK	SOP
1	Győr	6	4	0	2	13	8	+5	12	Advance to knockout phase	—	3–0	1–0	1–2
2	Tatabánya	6	3	1	2	13	9	+4	10	Advance to knockout phase	3–1	—	0–0	8–1
3	MTK	6	2	1	3	8	9	−1	7		2–3	4–1	—	2–1
4	Sopron	6	2	0	4	8	16	−8	6		1–4	0–1	3–0	—

Source: HFF

===== First round =====
14 August 2007	Győr	1–2	Sopron	Győr
18:00	Granát 36'	Report	Birtalan 50'; Dancs 84'	Stadium: ETO Park; Attendance: 400; Referee: Zoltán Iványi

15 August 2007	Tatabánya	0–0	MTK	Tatabánya
17:30		Report		Stadium: Stadion Városi; Attendance: 400; Referee: Szabolcs Szilasi

===== Second round =====
22 August 2007	Sopron	0–1	Tatabánya	Sopron
16:00		Report	Ferenczi 39'	Stadium: Stadion Városi; Referee: Tamás Arany

22 August 2007	MTK	2–3	Győr	Budapest
16:00	Á. Szabó 54', 79'	Report	L. Varga 43', 64'; Granát 45'	Stadium: Hidegkuti Nándor Stadion; Referee: Mihály Fábián

===== Third round =====
9 September 2007	Tatabánya	3–1	Győr	Tatabánya
16:30	Weisz 61'; Filó 67'; Hajdú 81'	Report	Tokody 73'	Stadium: Stadion Városi; Referee: Péter Solymosi

9 September 2007	MTK	2–1	Sopron	Budapest
19:00	Lencse 30'; Kecskés 85'	Report	Györök 90+2'	Stadium: Hidegkuti Nándor Stadion; Referee: Tamás Arany

===== Fourth round =====
19 September 2007	Győr	3–0	Tatabánya	Győr
16:00	R. Varga 53'; Granát 72', 86'	Report		Stadium: ETO Park; Attendance: 100; Referee: Gábor Oláh

19 September 2007	Sopron	3–0	MTK	Sopron
17:00	Zana 25' (pen.); Csikós 66'; Birtalan 75'	Report		Stadium: Stadion Városi; Attendance: 200; Referee: István Vad

===== Fifth round =====
3 October 2007	MTK	4–1	Tatabánya	Budapest
16:00	Tóth 57'; Kecskés 60'; Simon 61'; Ladóczki 64' (pen.)	Report	Kozák 72'	Stadium: Hidegkuti Nándor Stadion; Attendance: 200; Referee: Róbert Nagy

3 October 2007	Sopron	1–4	Győr	Sopron
18:00	Dancs 72'	Report	L. Varga 15'; Z. Kovács 48'; Granát 78' (pen.), 90'	Stadium: Stadion Városi; Attendance: 500; Referee: Sándor Andó-Szabó

===== Sixth round =====
9 October 2007	Tatabánya	8–1	Sopron	Tatabánya
15:00	Hajdú 8'; Megyesi 26'; Kriston 28', 55'; P. Horváth 34'; Farkas 48'; Sándor 63'; Batics 89'	Report	Giura 12'	Stadium: Stadion Városi; Attendance: 200; Referee: Tamás Arany

10 October 2007	Győr	1–0	MTK	Győr
15:00	Brnović 48'	Report		Stadium: ETO Park; Attendance: 300; Referee: Viktor Kassai

=== Knockout phase ===
Quarter-finals
Rákospalota	0	0	0
Zalaegerszeg	2	3	5
Fehérvár (a)	1	2	3
Győr	1	2	3
Debrecen	3	0	3
Újpest	0	0	0
Tatabánya	1	1	2
Diósgyőr	2	3	5

Semi-finals
Zalaegerszeg	2	1	3
Fehérvár (a.e.t.)	1	3	4
Debrecen	1	3	4
Diósgyőr	4	2	6

Final
Fehérvár	3	1	4
Diósgyőr	0	2	2

==== Quarter-finals ====
===== Summary =====
Team 1	Agg.	Team 2	1st leg	2nd leg
Rákospalota	0–5	Zalaegerszeg	0–2	0–3
Fehérvár	3–3 (a)	Győr	1–1	2–2
Debrecen	3–0	Újpest	3–0	0–0
Tatabánya	2–5	Diósgyőr	1–2	1–3

===== Matches =====
17 October 2007
14:30

Rákospalota	0–2	Zalaegerszeg
	Report	Pekič 28'; Botiș 71'

Stadion Budai II. Laszló, Budapest
Attendance: 200
Referee: Roland Veizer
27 October 2007
16:00

Zalaegerszeg	3–0	Rákospalota
Balázs 14', 72'; Lukács 53'	Report

ZTE Arena, Zalaegerszeg
Attendance: 800
Referee: Krisztián Király

Zalaegerszeg won 5–0 on aggregate.

17 October 2007
17:00

Fehérvár	1–1	Győr
Sitku 63'	Report	Tokody 81'

Sóstói Stadion, Székesfehérvár
Attendance: 200
Referee: Zoltán Iványi
27 October 2007
13:30

Győr	2–2	Fehérvár
Bogdanović 36'; Brnović 85'	Report	Disztl 6'; Á. Horváth 32'

ETO Park, Győr
Attendance: 400
Referee: Roland Veizer

3–3 on aggregate. Fehérvár won on away goals.

17 October 2007
20:30

Debrecen	3–0	Újpest
Czvitkovics 29'; Kerekes 78'; Kouemaha 90+2'	Report

Stadion Oláh Gábor Út, Debrecen
Referee: Mihály Fábián
28 October 2007
17:30

Újpest	0–0	Debrecen
	Report

Ferenc Szusza Stadium, Budapest
Attendance: 1,509
Referee: Abdul Rahman Hussein

Debrecen won 3–0 on aggregate.

16 October 2007

Tatabánya	1–2	Diósgyőr
Megyesi 89'	Report	Simon 9', 48'

Stadion Városi, Tatabánya
Attendance: 200
Referee: István Mészáros
26 October 2007
18:00

Diósgyőr	3–1	Tatabánya
Simon 21'; Farkas 82'; Lipusz 89'	Report	M. Takács 84'

Diósgyőri Stadion, Miskolc
Referee: Gyöngyi Gaál

Diósgyőr won 5–2 on aggregate.

==== Semi-finals ====
===== Summary =====
Team 1	Agg.	Team 2	1st leg	2nd leg
Zalaegerszeg	3–4	Fehérvár	2–1	1–3 (a.e.t.)
Debrecen	4–6	Diósgyőr	1–4	3–2

===== Matches =====
31 October 2007
17:00

Zalaegerszeg	2–1	Fehérvár
Méyé 54'; Botiș 70'	Report	Sitku 38'

ZTE Arena, Zalaegerszeg
Attendance: 1,500
Referee: Viktor Kassai
14 November 2007
18:00

Fehérvár	3–1 (a.e.t.)	Zalaegerszeg
Sitku 70', 116' (pen.); Božić 90+2'	Report	Méyé 45'

Sóstói Stadion, Székesfehérvár
Attendance: 152
Referee: Sándor Andó-Szabó

Fehérvár won 4–3 on aggregate.

31 October 2007
18:00

Debrecen	1–4	Diósgyőr
Sidibe 49'	Report	Katona 18'; Simon 28', 58'; Lipusz 68'

Stadion Oláh Gábor Út, Debrecen
Referee: Sándor Andó-Szabó
14 November 2007
18:00

Diósgyőr	2–3	Debrecen
Vukmir 48' (o.g.); Simon 60'	Report	P. Szilágyi 28', 32'; Kouemaha 90+1'

Diósgyőri Stadion, Miskolc
Attendance: 1,000
Referee: Zsolt Szabó

Diósgyőr won 6–4 on aggregate.

==== Final ====
18 November 2007

Fehérvár	3–0	Diósgyőr
Simek 38'; Dvéri 51'; Sitku 59'	Report

Sóstói Stadion, Székesfehérvár
Attendance: 1,000
Referee: Ferenc Bede
28 November 2007

Diósgyőr	2–1	Fehérvár
Simon 77'; Huszák 84'	Report	Sitku 70'

Diósgyőri Stadion, Miskolc
Attendance: 1,300
Referee: Zsolt Szabó

Fehérvár won 4–2 on aggregate and advanced to the Grand final.

== Spring season ==
=== Group stage ===
==== Group A ====
Pos	Team	Pld	W	D	L	GF	GA	GD	Pts	Qualification	ZAL	GYO	TAT	SOP
1	Zalaegerszeg	6	4	2	0	19	3	+16	14	Advance to knockout phase	—	1–1	7–0	5–0
2	Győr	6	4	2	0	16	6	+10	14	Advance to knockout phase	1–1	—	3–2	4–1
3	Tatabánya	6	1	0	5	7	19	−12	3		1–2	1–4	—	3–0 (Note: Sopron couldn't finish the 2007–08 season due to bankruptcy. All remaining matches were counted as won for their opponents.)
4	Sopron	6	1	0	5	4	18	−14	3	Exclution	0–3	0–3	3–0	—

Source: HFF

===== First round =====
1 December 2007	Győr	1–1	Zalaegerszeg	Győr
13:00	Dudás 13'	Report	Méyé 38'	Stadium: ETO Park; Attendance: 100; Referee: István Mészáros

1 December 2007	Sopron	3–0	Tatabánya	Sopron
13:00	Belić 34', 55'; Sifter 44'	Report		Stadium: Stadion Városi; Attendance: 200; Referee: Krisztián Király

===== Second round =====
5 December 2007	Tatabánya	1–4	Győr	Tatabánya
13:00	M. Takács 26'	Report	Csermelyi 9'; Koltai 33', 88'; Brnović 56'	Stadium: Stadion Városi; Attendance: 300; Referee: János Takács

5 December 2007	Zalaegerszeg	5–0	Sopron	Zalaegerszeg
13:00	Méyé 11'; Pekič 34'; Koplárovics 70', 78'; N. Tóth 83'	Report		Stadium: ZTE Arena; Attendance: 700; Referee: Krisztián Pánczél

===== Third round =====
8 December 2007	Zalaegerszeg	7–0	Tatabánya	Zalaegerszeg
13:00	Méyé 9', 46'; Koplárovics 32', 38'; Balázs 55'; Lukács 71'; Botiș 88'	Report		Stadium: ZTE Arena; Attendance: 800; Referee: Ádám Németh

8 December 2007	Győr	4–1	Sopron	Győr
13:00	Koltai 6'; Bajzát 20'; Bogdanović 32', 77'	Report	Legoza 66'	Stadium: ETO Park; Attendance: 300; Referee: Szabolcs Szilasi

===== Fourth round =====
16 February 2008	Tatabánya	1–2	Zalaegerszeg	Tatabánya
14:00	Vulin 11' (o.g.)	Report	Koplárovics 59'; Méyé 90'	Stadium: Stadion Városi; Attendance: 300; Referee: Tamás Bognár

19 February 2008	Sopron	0–3; Awarded	Győr	Sopron
		Report		Stadium: Stadion Városi

===== Fifth round =====
20 February 2008	Tatabánya	3–0; Awarded	Sopron	Tatabánya
		Report		Stadium: Stadion Városi

20 February 2008	Zalaegerszeg	1–1	Győr	Zalaegerszeg
14:00	Fülöp 60'	Report	Z. Kovács 30'	Stadium: ZTE Arena; Attendance: 400; Referee: Krisztián Pánczél

===== Sixth round =====
27 February 2008	Sopron	0–3; Awarded	Zalaegerszeg	Sopron
		Report		Stadium: Stadion Városi

27 February 2008	Győr	3–2	Tatabánya	Győr
14:00	Csermelyi 29'; Lappints 56', 87'	Report	Megyesi 73', 76'	Stadium: ETO Park; Attendance: 200; Referee: Gergely Sulyok

==== Group B ====
Pos	Team	Pld	W	D	L	GF	GA	GD	Pts	Qualification	PAK	SIO	KAP	FEH
1	Paks	6	5	0	1	16	10	+6	15	Advance to knockout phase	—	3–0	2–1	3–1
2	Siófok	6	3	0	3	15	13	+2	9	Advance to knockout phase	4–2	—	1–2	4–2
3	Kaposvár	6	3	0	3	11	11	0	9		4–5	2–1	—	2–0
4	Fehérvár	6	1	0	5	7	15	−8	3		0–1	2–5	2–0	—

Source: HFF

===== First round =====
30 November 2007	Paks	3–1	Fehérvár	Székesfehérvár
	Balaskó 21'; T. Kiss 49'; Vári 50'	Report	Disztl 75'	Stadium: Sóstói Stadion; Attendance: 50; Referee: Ádám Németh

1 December 2007	Siófok	1–2	Kaposvár	Kaposvár
13:00	Forgács 40'	Report	da Silva 48'; Szakály 60'	Stadium: Cseri úti Sporttelep; Attendance: 200; Referee: Tamás Bognár

===== Second round =====
5 December 2007	Kaposvár	4–5	Paks	Kaposvár
13:00	Grúz 43'; Alves 47'; Božović 55', 90+2'	Report	Éger 7'; Salamon 41'; Böde 62'; T. Kiss 69'; Vári 90'	Stadium: Stadion Rákóczi; Attendance: 200; Referee: Krisztián Király

5 December 2007	Fehérvár	2–5	Siófok	Székesfehérvár
14:00	Disztl 39', 49'	Report	Gajda 3'; S. Kanta 17'; Miklósvári 23', 75'; Melczer 72'	Stadium: Sóstói Stadion; Attendance: 150; Referee: Szabolcs Szilasi

===== Third round =====
8 December 2007	Siófok	4–2	Paks	Székesfehérvár
11:00	Fülöp 24'; Kozmor 67'; Z. Molnár 79' (o.g.); Csopaki 85'	Report	Heffler 14'; T. Kiss 28'	Stadium: Sóstói Stadion; Referee: Zoltán Iványi

8 December 2007	Kaposvár	2–0	Fehérvár	Kaposvár
13:00	Božović 44', 56'	Report		Stadium: Cseri úti Sporttelep; Attendance: 200; Referee: Gábor Oláh

===== Fourth round =====
16 February 2008	Fehérvár	2–0	Kaposvár	Székesfehérvár
14:00	Simek 19'; Farkas 62'	Report		Stadium: Sóstói Stadion; Attendance: 200; Referee: Szabolcs Szilasi

16 February 2008	Paks	3–0	Siófok	Paks
14:00	T. Kiss 13'; Balaskó 36'; Belényesi 90'	Report		Stadium: ASE Sporttelep; Attendance: 500; Referee: István Vad

===== Fifth round =====
20 February 2008	Kaposvár	2–1	Siófok	Kaposvár
14:00	Nikolić 29', 38'	Report	Forgács 89'	Stadium: Cseri úti Sporttelep; Attendance: 200; Referee: Ádám Németh

20 February 2008	Fehérvár	0–1	Paks	Székesfehérvár
14:00		Report	Weitner 37'	Stadium: Sóstói Stadion; Attendance: 100; Referee: József Erdős

===== Sixth round =====
27 February 2008	Siófok	4–2	Fehérvár	Siófok
14:00	Sütő 9'; Gajda 22'; Magasföldi 34'; Miklósvári 66'	Report	Csobánki 61', 81'	Stadium: Révész Street Stadium; Attendance: 200; Referee: Csaba Pintér

27 February 2008	Paks	2–1	Kaposvár	Paks
14:00	Báló 25', 27'	Report	Božović 61' (pen.)	Stadium: Fehérvári úti Stadion; Attendance: 150; Referee: Krisztián Király

==== Group C ====
Pos	Team	Pld	W	D	L	GF	GA	GD	Pts	Qualification	DEB	RAK	HON	NYI
1	Debrecen	6	4	1	1	10	8	+2	13	Advance to knockout phase	—	3–2	2–1	2–1
2	Rákospalota	6	3	1	2	9	10	−1	9 (Note: Rákospalota were deducted 1 point.)	Advance to knockout phase	3–1	—	1–1	2–0
3	Honvéd	6	2	2	2	13	8	+5	8		1–2	5–0	—	4–2
4	Nyíregyháza	6	0	2	4	4	10	−6	2		0–0	0–1	1–1	—

Source: HFF

===== First round =====
30 November 2007	Rákospalota	3–1	Debrecen	Budapest
13:00	Torma 33', 42'; Kapcsos 49'	Report	Czvitkovics 50'	Stadium: Stadion Budai II. Laszló; Attendance: 100; Referee: József Berger

1 December 2007	Honvéd	4–2	Nyíregyháza	Budapest
13:00	Guié 3'; Hercegfalvi 5', 38'; Zsolnai 84'	Report	Montvai 65'; Apostu 74'	Stadium: Bozsik József Stadion; Attendance: 800; Referee: Róbert Nagy

===== Second round =====
5 December 2007	Rákospalota	1–1	Honvéd	Budapest
13:00	Kapcsos 72'	Report	Hercegfalvi 65'	Stadium: Stadion Budai II. Laszló; Attendance: 400; Referee: István Vad

5 December 2007	Debrecen	2–1	Nyíregyháza	Debrecen
13:00	Z. Takács 8'; Czvitkovics 34'	Report	Apostu 47'	Stadium: Stadion Oláh Gábor Út; Attendance: 600; Referee: Zsolt Szabó

===== Third round =====
8 December 2007	Debrecen	2–1	Honvéd	Debrecen
13:00	Z. Takács 41' (pen.), 80'	Report	Veledar 37'	Stadium: Stadion Oláh Gábor Út; Attendance: 400; Referee: Péter Solymosi

8 December 2007	Rákospalota	2–0	Nyíregyháza	Budapest
13:00	Z. Varga 12'; Torma 45'	Report		Stadium: Stadion Budai II. Laszló; Attendance: 150; Referee: Ferenc Bede

===== Fourth round =====
16 February 2008	Honvéd	1–2	Debrecen	Budapest
13:00	Ivancsics 4'	Report	Dombi 20'; Kouemaha 45'	Stadium: Bozsik József Stadion; Attendance: 1,100; Referee: Zsolt Szabó

16 February 2008	Nyíregyháza	0–1	Rákospalota	Nyíregyháza
14:00		Report	Nyerges 57'	Stadium: Városi Stadion; Attendance: 400; Referee: Zoltán Iványi

===== Fifth round =====
20 February 2008	Debrecen	3–2	Rákospalota	Debrecen
14:00	R. Nagy 22'; Rudolf 47', 71'	Report	Nyerges 32', 73'	Stadium: Stadion Oláh Gábor Út; Attendance: 1,000; Referee: Attila Hegedűs

20 February 2008	Nyíregyháza	1–1	Honvéd	Nyíregyháza
14:00	Granát 42'	Report	Fritz 80'	Stadium: Városi Stadion; Attendance: 600; Referee: Sándor Andó-Szabó

===== Sixth round =====
27 February 2008	Nyíregyháza	0–0	Debrecen	Nyíregyháza
14:00		Report		Stadium: Városi Stadion; Attendance: 800; Referee: Róbert Nagy

27 February 2008	Honvéd	5–0	Rákospalota	Budapest
18:00	Veledar 26' (pen.), 48' (pen.); Koós 83', 85', 90+1'	Report		Stadium: Bozsik József Stadion; Attendance: 1,200; Referee: Tibor Gyarmati II

==== Group D ====
Pos	Team	Pld	W	D	L	GF	GA	GD	Pts	Qualification	MTK	UJP	VAS	DIO
1	MTK	6	4	2	0	12	6	+6	14	Advance to knockout phase	—	2–0	3–2	2–1
2	Újpest	6	3	0	3	14	9	+5	9	Advance to knockout phase	1–3	—	1–2	3–1
3	Vasas	6	2	1	3	9	16	−7	7		1–1	0–7	—	4–1
4	Diósgyőr	6	1	1	4	8	12	−4	4		1–1	1–2	3–0	—

Source: HFF

===== First round =====
1 December 2007	Újpest	1–3	MTK	Budapest
13:00	Moldovan 88'	Report	Pollák 29'; Kulcsár 55', 78'	Stadium: Ferenc Szusza Stadium; Attendance: 1,000; Referee: Csaba Imre Sápi

1 December 2007	Diósgyőr	3–0	Vasas	Miskolc
13:00	Lipusz 50', 75'; Huszák 56'	Report		Stadium: Diósgyőri Stadion; Attendance: 300; Referee: Roland Veizer

===== Second round =====
5 December 2007	MTK	3–2	Vasas	Budapest
18:00	Bori 11'; J. Kanta 70', 73'	Report	Mundi 76'; Iheanacho 88'	Stadium: Hidegkuti Nándor Stadion; Referee: Tamás Bognár

5 December 2007	Újpest	3–1	Diósgyőr	Budapest
18:00	Sándor 29'; Moldovan 50'; Z. Kovács 63'	Report	Simon 36'	Stadium: Ferenc Szusza Stadium; Attendance: 726; Referee: Tamás Arany

===== Third round =====
8 December 2007	Vasas	0–7	Újpest	Budapest
13:00		Report	Kéthévoama 8'; Z. Kovács 18'; Moldovan 29'; Vermes 62'; Korcsmár 69'; O. Nagy 78'; Balog 87' (o.g.)	Stadium: Stadion Rudolf Illovszky; Attendance: 800; Referee: István Mészáros

8 December 2007	MTK	2–1	Diósgyőr	Budapest
13:00	Urbán 28'; Bori 66'	Report	Lipusz 40'	Stadium: Hidegkuti Nándor Stadion; Attendance: 200; Referee: Péter Pető

===== Fourth round =====
16 February 2008	Vasas	1–1	MTK	Budapest
13:00	N. Németh 58'	Report	J. Kanta 75'	Stadium: Promontor utcai Stadion; Attendance: 150; Referee: Ferenc Bede

16 February 2008	Diósgyőr	1–2	Újpest	Miskolc
14:00	Cardozo 52'	Report	Dourandi 7'; Tisza 67'	Stadium: Diósgyőri Stadion; Attendance: 3,000; Referee: István Mészáros

===== Fifth round =====
19 February 2008	Vasas	4–1	Diósgyőr	Budapest
13:00	Piller 13', 60'; Divić 23'; M. Kiss 35'	Report	Vitelki 54'	Stadium: Szamosi Mihály Sporttelep; Attendance: 300; Referee: Tamás Arany

20 February 2008	MTK	2–0	Újpest	Budapest
18:00	Lambulić 52'; Á. Szabó 78'	Report		Stadium: Hidegkuti Nándor Stadion; Referee: Roland Veizer

===== Sixth round =====
27 February 2008	Diósgyőr	1–1	MTK	Miskolc
14:00	Simon 18'	Report	Rodenbücher 90+1'	Stadium: Diósgyőri Stadion; Attendance: 500; Referee: Csaba Imre Sápi

27 February 2008	Újpest	1–2	Vasas	Budapest
18:00	Györök 20'	Report	Lázok 51', 56'	Stadium: Ferenc Szusza Stadium; Attendance: 1,023; Referee: János Takács

=== Knockout phase ===
Quarter-finals
Rákospalota	0	0	0
MTK	4	6	10
Győr	1	2	3
Paks	1	1	2
Újpest	1	0	1
Debrecen	5	5	10
Siófok	2	0	2
Zalaegerszeg	0	0	0

Semi-finals
MTK	1	0	1
Győr	1	2	3
Debrecen	2	0	2
Siófok	0	0	0

Final
Győr	2	0	2
Debrecen	0	6	6

==== Quarter-finals ====
===== Summary =====
Team 1	Agg.	Team 2	1st leg	2nd leg
Rákospalota	0–10	MTK	0–4	0–6
Győr	3–2	Paks	1–1	2–1
Újpest	1–10	Debrecen	1–5	0–5
Siófok	2–0	Zalaegerszeg	2–0	0–0

===== Matches =====
5 March 2008

Rákospalota	0–4	MTK
	Report	Gosztonyi 13'; Molnár 16'; Kecskés 62' (pen.); Vadnai 77'

Stadion Budai II. Laszló, Budapest
Attendance: 100
Referee: István Mészáros
12 March 2008

MTK	6–0	Rákospalota
Lencse 6', 54'; Kecskés 44' (pen.); Gosztonyi 51'; L. Horváth 55'; Boda 81'	Report

Hidegkuti Nándor Stadion, Budapest
Attendance: 100
Referee: Ádám Németh

MTK Budapest won 10–0 on aggregate.

5 March 2008

Győr	1–1	Paks
Pákolicz 39'	Report	Tamási 88'

ETO Park, Győr
Attendance: 200
Referee: Tamás Bognár
12 March 2008

Paks	1–2	Győr
Balaskó 88'	Report	Lappints 72'; Sánta 81'

Fehérvári úti Stadion, Paks
Attendance: 400
Referee: Péter Solymosi

Győr won 3–2 on aggregate.

5 March 2008

Újpest	1–5	Debrecen
Hajdú 50'	Report	Stojkov 6'; Kouemaha 59', 85'; Huszák 65'; Leandro 77'

Ferenc Szusza Stadium, Budapest
Referee: István Vad
12 March 2008

Debrecen	5–0	Újpest
Bogdanović 8' (pen.), 44', 54' (pen.), 77'; Rezes 13'	Report

Stadion Oláh Gábor Út, Debrecen
Attendance: 3,000
Referee: Zoltán Iványi

Debrecen won 10–1 on aggregate.

5 March 2008

Siófok	2–0	Zalaegerszeg
B. Horváth 48'; Basara 84'	Report

Révész Street Stadium, Siófok
Attendance: 250
Referee: Szabolcs Szilasi
12 March 2008

Zalaegerszeg	0–0	Siófok
	Report

ZTE Arena, Zalaegerszeg
Attendance: 500
Referee: Tamás Bognár

Siófok won 2–0 on aggregate.

==== Semi-finals ====
===== Summary =====
Team 1	Agg.	Team 2	1st leg	2nd leg
MTK	1–3	Győr	1–1	0–2
Debrecen	2–0	Siófok	2–0	0–0

===== Matches =====
15 April 2008

MTK	1–1	Győr
Rodenbücher 53'	Report	Z. Kovács 64'

Hidegkuti Nándor Stadion, Budapest
Attendance: 150
Referee: Zsolt Szabó
23 April 2008

Győr	2–0	MTK
L. Varga 11'; Dudás 70'	Report

ETO Park, Győr
Attendance: 1,300
Referee: Tamás Arany

Győr 3–1 on aggregate.

16 April 2008

Debrecen	2–0	Siófok
Chigou 8', 28'	Report

Stadion Oláh Gábor Út, Debrecen
Referee: István Vad
23 April 2008

Siófok	0–0	Debrecen
	Report

Révész Street Stadium, Siófok
Attendance: 150
Referee: Hawla Hussein

Debrecen won 2–0 on aggregate.

==== Final ====
30 April 2008

Győr	2–0	Debrecen
Tokody 40'; Dudás 43'	Report

ETO Park, Győr
Referee: István Vad
7 May 2008

Debrecen	6–0	Győr
Kouemaha 9', 44'; Huszák 33'; Bogdanović 78', 84'; Pákolicz 79' (o.g.)	Report

Stadion Oláh Gábor Út, Debrecen
Attendance: 4,000
Referee: Viktor Kassai

Debrecen won 6–2 on aggregate and advanced to the Grand final.

== Grand final ==
=== First leg ===
14 May 2008

Fehérvár	1–0	Debrecen
Dajić 22'	Report

Sóstói Stadion, Székesfehérvár
Attendance: 800
Referee: Tamás Bognár

=== Second leg ===
20 May 2008

Debrecen	0–2	Fehérvár
	Report	Sifter 58'; Sitku 71'

Stadion Oláh Gábor Út, Debrecen
Attendance: 1,000
Referee: Zoltán Iványi

Fehérvár won 3–0 on aggregate.
