= Daniel Kogler =

Austrian footballer

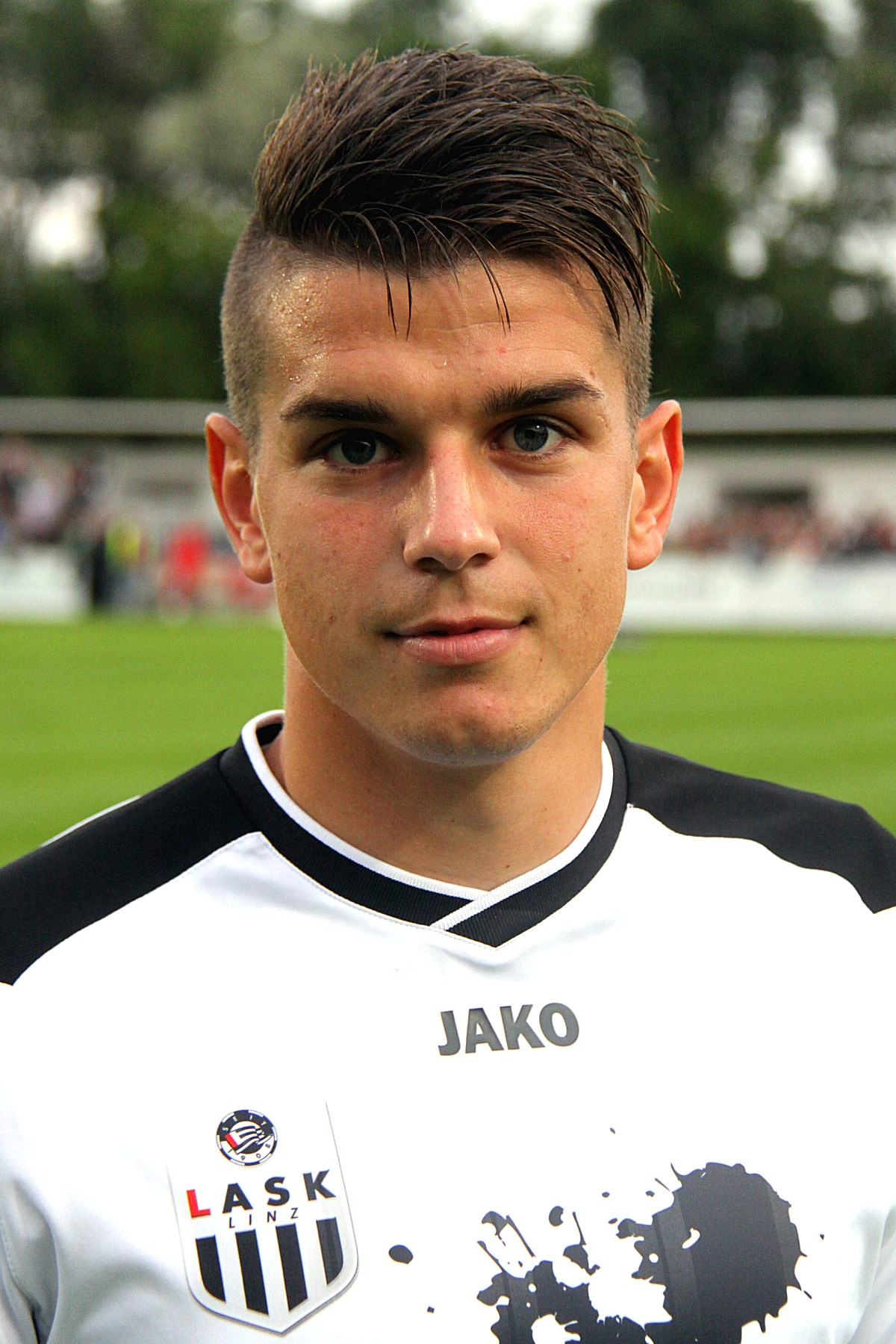

Personal information
- Date of birth: 16 August 1988 (age 38)
- Place of birth: Amstetten, Austria
- Height: 1.65 m (5 ft 5 in)
- Position: Midfielder

Team information
- Current team: Rapid Wien (youth coach)

Youth career
- 2002–2006: SKN St. Pölten

Senior career*
Years	Team	Apps	(Gls)
2006–2007	SKN St. Pölten	7	(2)
2007–2008	SV Bad Aussee	24	(4)
2008–2009	FK Velež Mostar	1	(0)
2009	BFC Siófok	13	(3)
2009–2010	FC Waidhofen/Ybbs	30	(11)
2010–2015	LASK Linz	122	(16)
2015–2016	SV Horn	10	(2)
2016–2018	Kremser SC	43	(17)
2019–2020	Union Mauer	10	(2)

Managerial career
- 2018–: Rapid Wien (youth coach)
- * Club domestic league appearances and goals

Daniel Kogler (born 16 August 1988) is an Austrian footballer, who played as a midfielder.

== Career ==
=== Club career ===
He had previously played for Austrian SKN St. Pölten and SV Bad Aussee, Bosnian FK Velež Mostar, Hungarian BFC Siófok and back in Austria with FC Waidhofen/Ybbs.
