= Ognjen Lakić =

Serbian footballer

Ognjen Lakić Огњен Лакић
Personal information
- Date of birth: 1 August 1978 (age 48)
- Height: 1.80 m (5 ft 11 in)
- Position: Forward

Senior career*
Years	Team	Apps	(Gls)
1997–1998	Hajduk Kula	2	(0)
1998–1999	Bečej	21	(0)
1999–2000	Hajduk Kula	1	(0)
2000–2001	Krylia Sovetov Samara	8	(2)
2001	Dinamo Tbilisi	0	(0)
2002	Rudar Ugljevik	7	(0)
2003	Bečej	13	(0)
2003	Radnički Sombor		
2004	Srem	17	(5)
2005	Hapoel Tel Aviv	4	(0)
2006	Maccabi Petah Tikva	6	(0)
2006	Lokomotiv Vitebsk	3	(0)
2007	Siófok	1	(1)
2009–2010	Aris Limassol	3	(0)
- * Club domestic league appearances and goals

Ognjen Lakić (Serbian Cyrillic: Огњен Лакић; born 1 August 1978) is a Serbian retired football player.
