= Roni Ribeiro =

Brazilian footballer

Personal information
- Full name: Roni da Silva Ribeiro
- Date of birth: 30 June 1980 (age 46)
- Place of birth: Brazil
- Height: 1.71 m (5 ft 7 1/2 in)
- Position: Midfielder

Team information
- Current team: SG Neudorf/Parndorf

Senior career*
| Years | Team | Apps | (Gls) |
| 2002–2006 | Répcelak SE | 21 | (14) |
| 2006–2008 | Lombard-Pápa TFC | 35 | (3) |
| 2008–2009 | Bajai LSE | 15 | (8) |
| 2009–2011 | BFC Siófok | 33 | (8) |
| 2010–2011 | → Budaörsi SC (loan) | 26 | (2) |
| 2011– | SG Neudorf/Parndorf | ? | (?) |
- * Club domestic league appearances and goals as of 11 July 2012

Roni da Silva Ribeiro (born 30 June 1980 in Brazil) is a Brazilian football (midfielder) player who currently plays for SG Neudorf/Parndorf.
