= Richárd Tusori =

Hungarian footballer

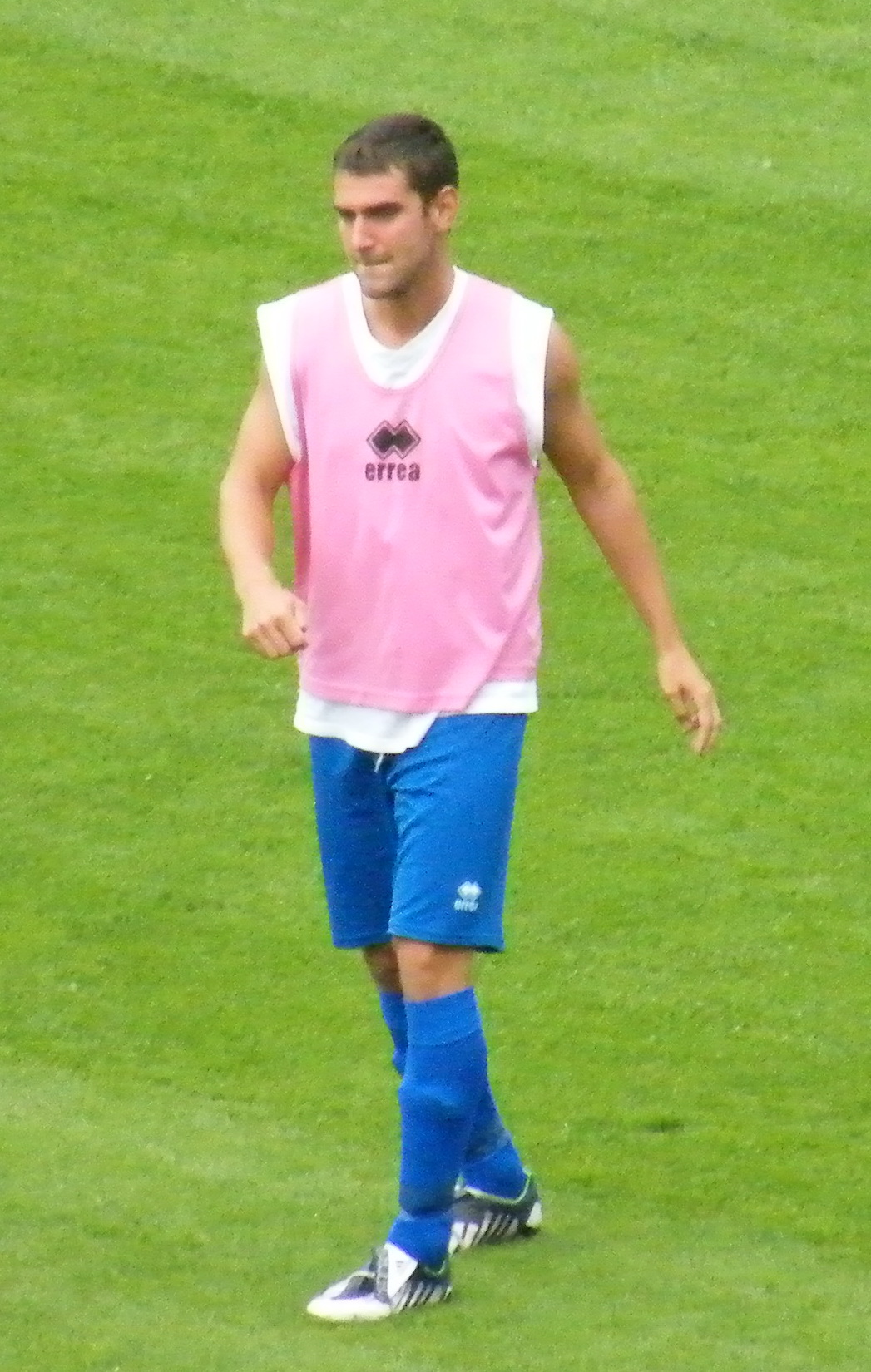

Personal information
- Full name: Richárd Tusori
- Date of birth: 12 July 1984 (age 42)
- Place of birth: Miskolc, Hungary
- Height: 1.88 m (6 ft 2 in)
- Position: Defender

Team information
- Current team: BFC Siófok
- Number: 6

Youth career
- 2000–2003: Diósgyőri VTK
- 2003–2005: Veszprémi LC

Senior career*
Years	Team	Apps	(Gls)
2005–2009	BFC Siófok	91	(6)
2009–2010	TV Hardheim	21	(10)
2010–2012	BFC Siófok	45	(5)
- * Club domestic league appearances and goals as of 5 February 2012

Richárd Tusori (born 12 July 1984, in Miskolc) is a Hungarian football (defender) player who currently plays for Sv Weng.
