= Tamás Huszák =

Hungarian footballer

Personal information
- Full name: Tamás Huszák
- Date of birth: October 2, 1988 (age 38)
- Place of birth: Miskolc, Hungary
- Height: 1.86 m (6 ft 1 in)
- Position: Midfielder

Team information
- Current team: Nyíregyháza
- Number: 7

Youth career
- 2003–2006: Debrecen

Senior career*
Years	Team	Apps	(Gls)
2006–2008	Diósgyőr	13	(0)
2007–2008	→ Diósgyőr II	12	(2)
2008–	Debrecen	9	(2)
2008–2009	→ Debrecen II	31	(8)
2009–2010	→ Diósgyőr (loan)	14	(2)
2009–2010	→ Diósgyőr II (loan)	2	(2)
2011–2012	→ Siófok (loan)	18	(1)
2012–2013	→ Tatabánya (loan)	30	(9)
2013–	Nyíregyháza	33	(2)
- * Club domestic league appearances and goals as of 23 November 2014

Tamás Huszák (Hungarian pronunciation: [ˈtɒmaːʃ ˈhusaːk]; born October 2, 1988, in Miskolc) is a Hungarian football (midfielder) player who currently plays for Debreceni VSC.
