= Marcell Takács =

Hungarian footballer

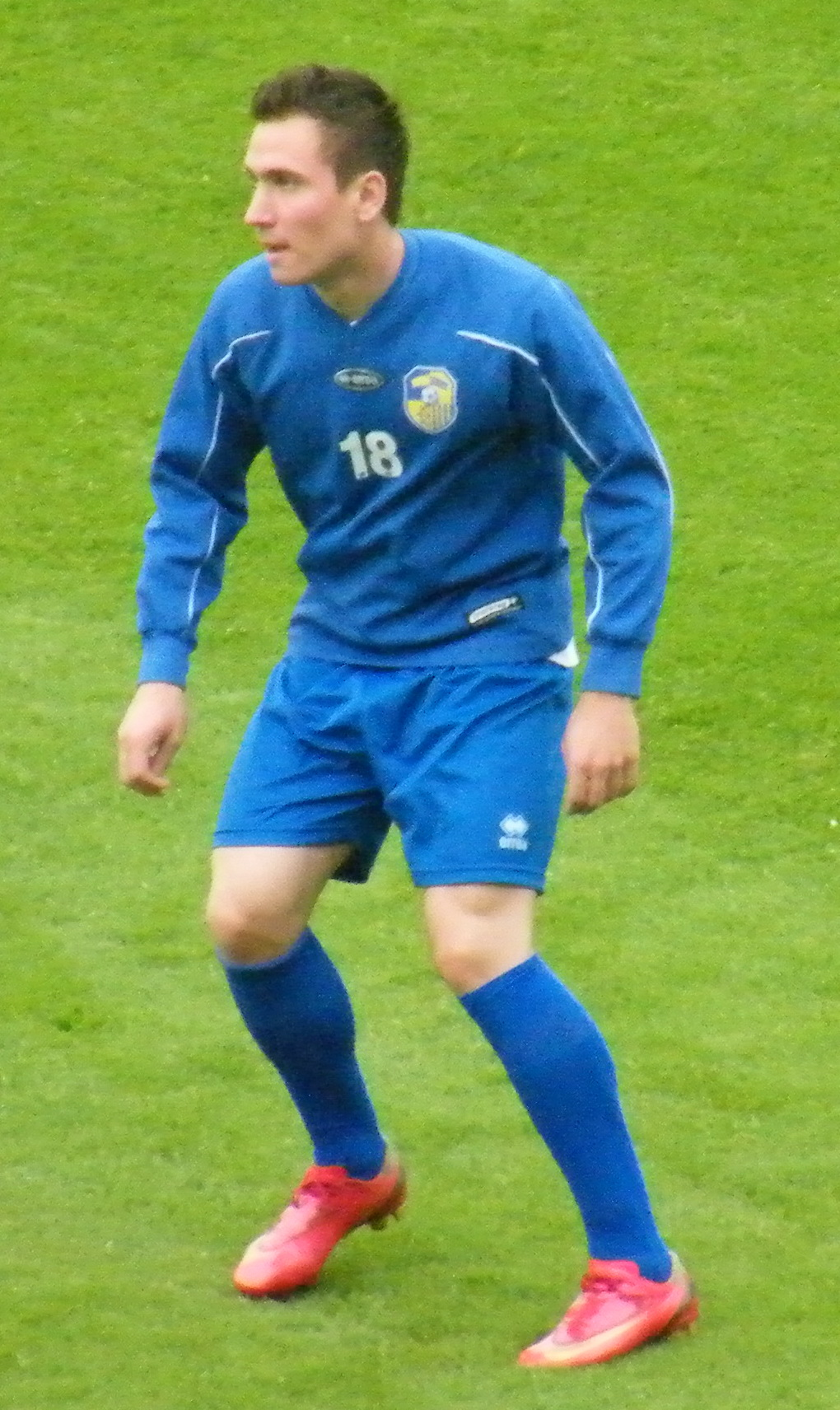

Personal information
- Full name: Marcell Takács
- Date of birth: 24 July 1989 (age 37)
- Place of birth: Budapest, Hungary
- Height: 1.82 m (6 ft 0 in)
- Position: Midfielder

Team information
- Current team: Cegléd
- Number: 4

Youth career
- 1997–2002: Goldball
- 2002–2003: Honvéd
- 2003–2006: MTK

Senior career*
| Years | Team | Apps | (Gls) |
| 2006–2008 | Tatabánya | 24 | (4) |
| 2008–2009 | Újpest | 3 | (0) |
| 2008–2009 | → Siófok (loan) | 13 | (2) |
| 2009–2010 | Rostocker | 9 | (2) |
| 2010 | Hansa Rostock II | 7 | (1) |
| 2010–2011 | Goslarer | 12 | (3) |
| 2011 | Wil | 8 | (1) |
| 2011–2012 | BKV Előre | 13 | (2) |
| 2012–2013 | Schötz | 23 | (4) |
| 2013– | Cegléd | 3 | (0) |

International career
| 2007 | Hungary U-17 | 7 | (2) |
| 2009 | Hungary U-19 | 6 | (0) |
| 2010 | Hungary U-20 | | |
- * Club domestic league appearances and goals as of 17 November 2013

Marcell Takács (born 24 July 1989, in Budapest) is a Hungarian footballer (midfielder) player who currently plays for FC Schötz.

He made his debut in August 2006, coming on as a substitute in the closing stages of the match against Paksi FC, and went on to play a total of 14 league games for FC Tatabánya until the end of the season, helping the team secure survival in the top flight by finishing twelfth in the final standings. In the 2007/08 season, Takács played another twelve matches for FC Tatabánya, which ultimately finished last in the table and was relegated to the second division.
