= János Miklósvári =

Hungarian footballer

Personal information
- Full name: János Miklósvári
- Date of birth: 10 April 1984 (age 42)
- Place of birth: Budapest, Hungary
- Height: 1.83 m (6 ft 0 in)
- Position: Defender

Team information
- Current team: Cegléd
- Number: 16

Youth career
- 1998–2002: Siófok

Senior career*
| Years | Team | Apps | (Gls) |
| 2002–2008 | Siófok | 66 | (1) |
| 2002–2005 | → Bodajk (loan) | 37 | (1) |
| 2008–2010 | Cegléd | 53 | (3) |
| 2010–2012 | BKV Előre | 52 | (2) |
| 2012– | Cegléd | 41 | (0) |
- * Club domestic league appearances and goals as of 1 June 2014

János Miklósvári (born 10 April 1984) is a Hungarian professional footballer who plays for Ceglédi VSE.

== Career statistics ==
Appearances and goals by club, season and competition
| Club | Season | League | | Cup | | League Cup | | Europe | | Total | |
| Club | Season | Apps | Goals | Apps | Goals | Apps | Goals | Apps | Goals | Apps | Goals |
|---|---|---|---|---|---|---|---|---|---|---|---|
Bodajk
| Bodajk | 2002–03 | 26 | 0 | 0 | 0 | 0 | 0 | 0 | 0 | 26 | 0 |
| Bodajk | 2004–05 | 11 | 1 | 1 | 0 | 0 | 0 | 0 | 0 | 12 | 1 |
| Bodajk | Total | 37 | 1 | 1 | 0 | 0 | 0 | 0 | 0 | 38 | 1 |
Siófok
| Siófok | 2005–06 | 23 | 0 | 0 | 0 | 0 | 0 | 0 | 0 | 23 | 0 |
| Siófok | 2006–07 | 26 | 0 | 0 | 0 | 0 | 0 | 0 | 0 | 26 | 0 |
| Siófok | 2007–08 | 17 | 1 | 0 | 0 | 8 | 3 | 0 | 0 | 25 | 4 |
| Siófok | Total | 66 | 1 | 0 | 0 | 8 | 3 | 0 | 0 | 74 | 4 |
Cegléd
| Cegléd | 2008–09 | 27 | 1 | 1 | 0 | 0 | 0 | 0 | 0 | 28 | 1 |
| Cegléd | 2009–10 | 26 | 2 | 2 | 0 | 0 | 0 | 0 | 0 | 28 | 2 |
| Cegléd | 2012–13 | 18 | 0 | 1 | 0 | 0 | 0 | 0 | 0 | 19 | 0 |
| Cegléd | 2013–14 | 23 | 0 | 1 | 0 | 5 | 1 | 0 | 0 | 29 | 1 |
| Cegléd | Total | 94 | 3 | 5 | 0 | 5 | 1 | 0 | 0 | 104 | 4 |
BKV Előre
| BKV Előre | 2010–11 | 26 | 1 | 3 | 0 | 0 | 0 | 0 | 0 | 29 | 1 |
| BKV Előre | 2011–12 | 26 | 1 | 2 | 0 | 0 | 0 | 0 | 0 | 28 | 1 |
| BKV Előre | Total | 52 | 2 | 5 | 0 | 0 | 0 | 0 | 0 | 57 | 2 |
| Career total | | 249 | 7 | 11 | 0 | 13 | 4 | 0 | 0 | 273 | 11 |

Updated to games played as of 1 June 2014.
