= Dániel Köntös =

Hungarian footballer

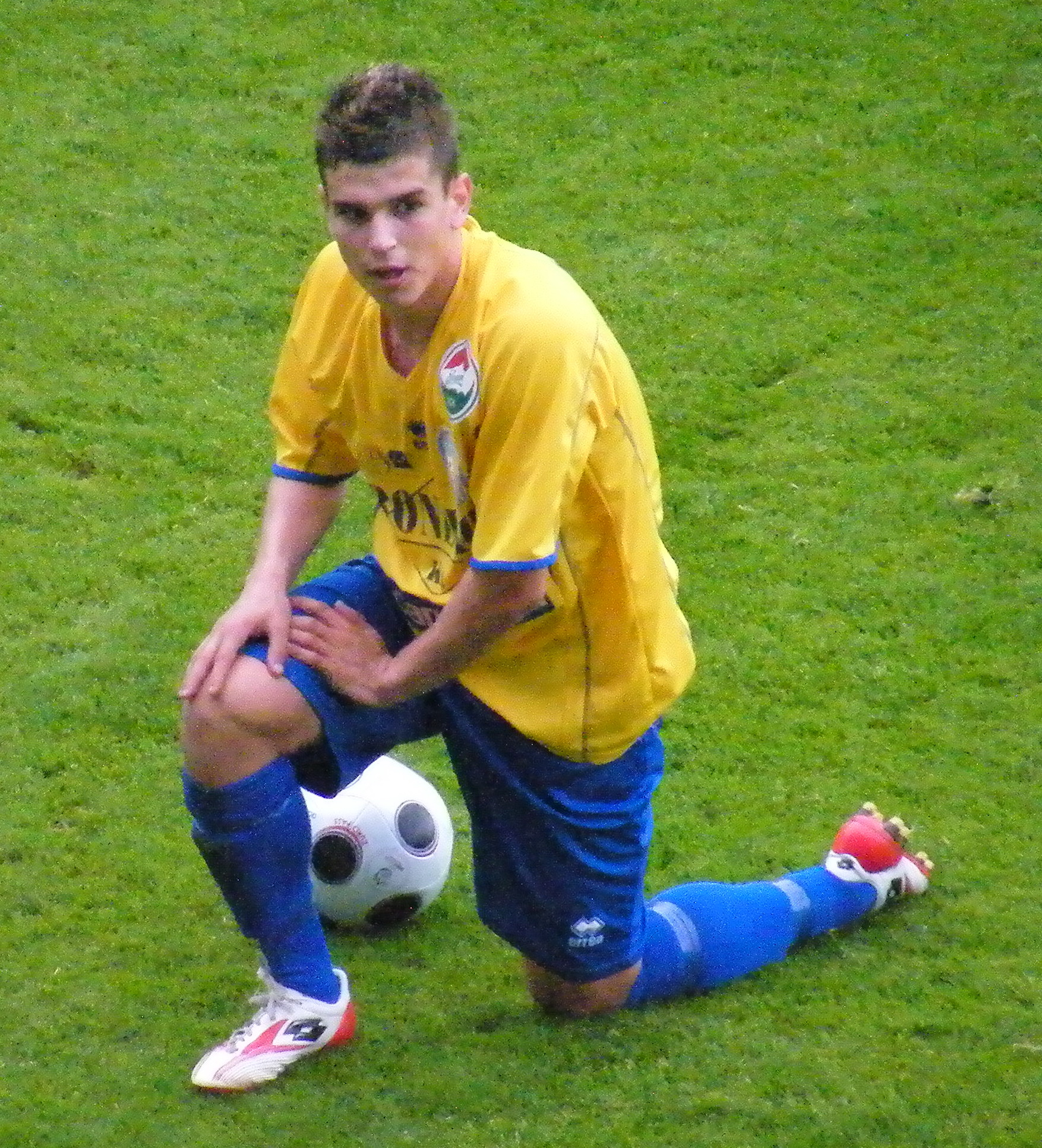

Personal information
- Date of birth: 15 June 1984 (age 42)
- Place of birth: Székesfehérvár, Hungary
- Height: 1.78 m (5 ft 10 in)
- Position: Defender

Team information
- Current team: Csákvári TK
- Number: 16

Youth career
- 2000–2004: Videoton FC

Senior career*
Years	Team	Apps	(Gls)
2004–2005	Felcsút SE	19	(1)
2005–2010	BFC Siófok	97	(1)
2010–2011	FC Tatabánya	21	(0)
2011–2012	BFC Siófok	0	(0)
2012	Dunafém-Maroshegy SE	14	(3)
2012–	Pálhalma SE	0	(0)
- * Club domestic league appearances and goals as of 11 July 2012

Dániel Köntös (born 15 June 1984, in Székesfehérvár) is a Hungarian football (defender) player who currently plays for Csákvári TK.
