= István Ladóczki =

Hungarian footballer

Personal information
- Full name: István Ladóczki
- Date of birth: 11 January 1986 (age 40)
- Place of birth: Budapest, Hungary
- Height: 1.80 m (5 ft 11 in)
- Position: Midfielder

Team information
- Current team: USC Mank
- Number: 23

Youth career
- 2000–2003: MTK Budapest FC

Senior career*
Years	Team	Apps	(Gls)
2003–2008	MTK Budapest FC	6	(0)
2004–2007	→ BFC Siófok (loan)	57	(10)
2008–2009	BFC Siófok	3	(0)
2009	Ceglédi VSE	14	(1)
2009–2010	SC Union Ardagger		
2010	ATSV Ober-Grafendorf		
2010–2011	ASV Radlberg		
2011–	USC Mank		
- * Club domestic league appearances and goals as of 11 July 2012

István Ladóczki (born 11 January 1986) is a Hungarian football player who currently plays for USC Mank.
