= Dennis Dourandi =

Cameroonian footballer

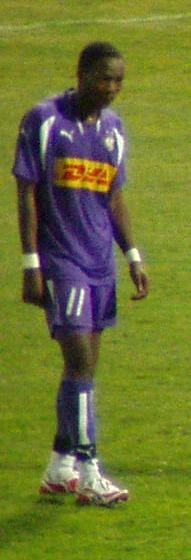

Personal information
- Full name: Denis Arthur Mboudgui Dourandi
- Date of birth: February 8, 1983 (age 43)
- Place of birth: Kaélé, Cameroon
- Height: 1.84 m (6 ft 0 in)
- Position: Striker

Team information
- Current team: Université FC de Ngaoundéré

Senior career*
Years	Team	Apps	(Gls)
2001–2002	Unisport de Bafang		
2002–2003	Étoile Sportive du Sahel		
2003–2004	SpVgg Greuther Fürth	1	(0)
2004–2005	Sahel FC		
2005–2007	SC Olhanense	17	(1)
2007–2008	Újpest FC	16	(6)
2008–	Université FC de Ngaoundéré		
- * Club domestic league appearances and goals

Dennis Dourandi (born February 8, 1983) is a Cameroonian footballer who currently plays as a striker for Université FC de Ngaoundéré.
