= Tibor Moldovan =

Romanian footballer

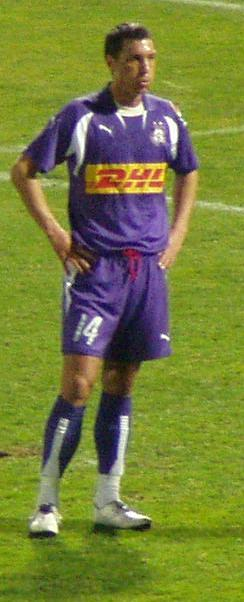
- Tibor Moldovan in 2008

Personal information
- Full name: Tibor Florian Moldovan
- Date of birth: 3 May 1982 (age 44)
- Place of birth: Târgu Mureș, Romania
- Height: 1.88 m (6 ft 2 in)
- Position: Striker

Youth career
- –2002: Rapid București

Senior career*
| Years | Team | Apps | (Gls) |
| 2002–2004 | Apulum Alba Iulia | 29 | (17) |
| 2005 | Dinamo București | 5 | (1) |
| 2005 | Dinamo II București | 8 | (3) |
| 2005–2007 | Farul Constanţa | 55 | (12) |
| 2007 | Nyíregyháza Spartacus | 7 | (0) |
| 2008 | Újpest | 5 | (1) |
| 2008 | Farul Constanţa | 0 | (0) |
| 2009 | Unirea Alba Iulia | 12 | (3) |
| 2009 | Gloria Bistriţa | 5 | (0) |
| 2010–2011 | Gloria II Bistriţa | | |
| 2011–2012 | Luceafărul Oradea | 19 | (6) |
| 2012–2013 | Vecsési FC | 2 | (0) |
| Total | | 147 | (43) |
- * Club domestic league appearances and goals as of 12 May 2012

Tibor Florian Moldovan (born 3 May 1982) is a former Romanian professional footballer.
