= Lajos Nagy (footballer) =

Hungarian footballer

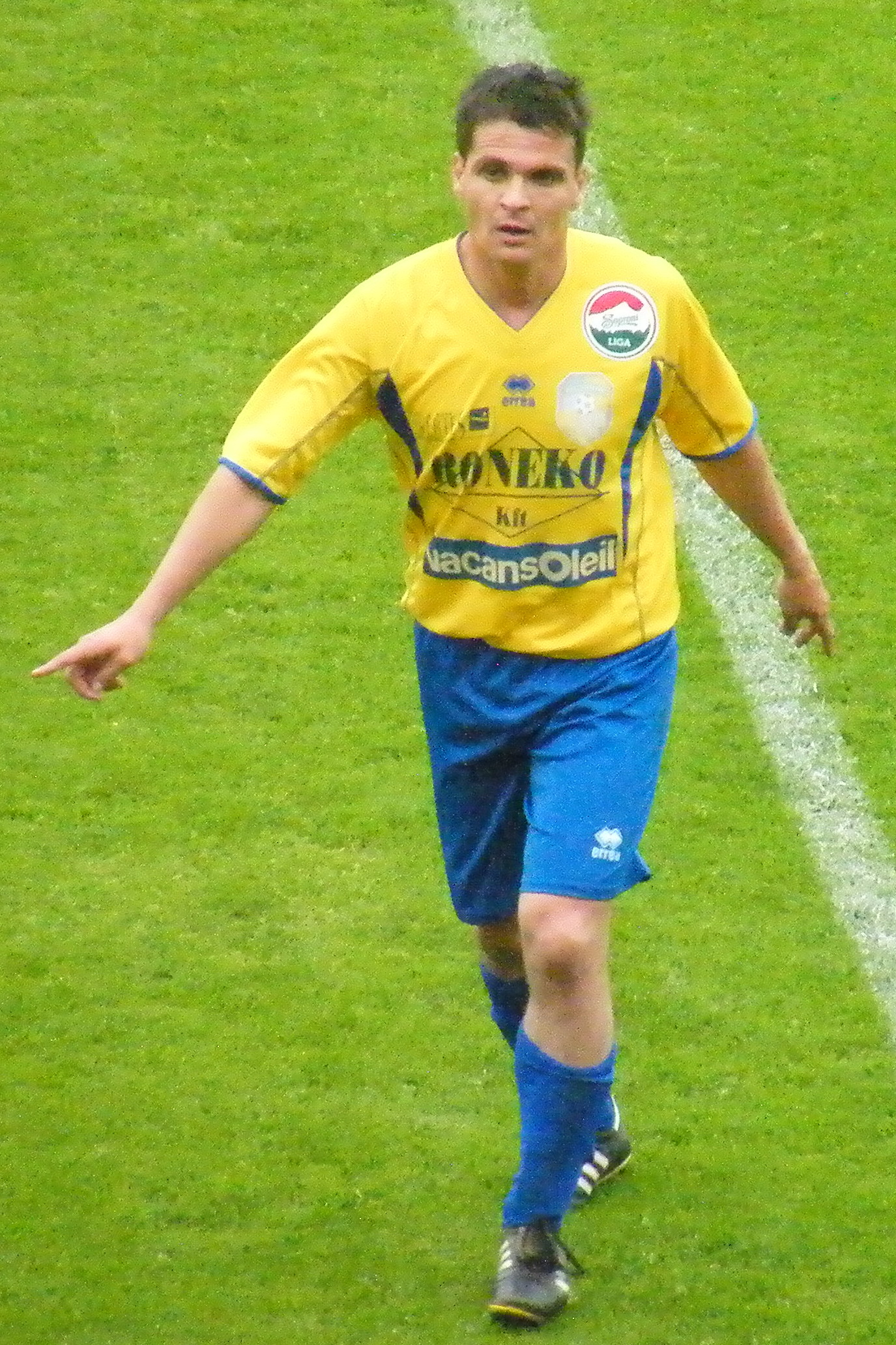

Personal information
- Date of birth: 17 December 1975 (age 50)
- Place of birth: Székesfehérvár, Hungary
- Height: 1.73 m (5 ft 8 in)
- Position: Midfielder

Team information
- Current team: Ceglédi VSE
- Number: 8

Senior career*
Years	Team	Apps	(Gls)
1995–1996	Videoton FC	10	(0)
1996–1998	Gázszer FC	73	(11)
1998–1999	Videoton FC	16	(2)
1999–2007	Zalaegerszegi TE	180	(16)
2007–2010	BFC Siófok	66	(1)
2010	Leibnitz Flavia Solva		
2010–	Ceglédi VSE	55	(3)
- * Club domestic league appearances and goals as of 3 June 2012

Lajos Nagy (born 17 December 1975 in Székesfehérvár) is a Hungarian football (midfielder) player who currently plays for Ceglédi VSE.
