= Marko Basara =

Serbian footballer

Personal information
- Full name: Marko Basara
- Date of birth: July 27, 1984 (age 42)
- Place of birth: Belgrade, SFR Yugoslavia
- Height: 1.80 m (5 ft 11 in)
- Position: Midfielder

Youth career
- Partizan

Senior career*
| Years | Team | Apps | (Gls) |
| 2002–2003 | Teleoptik | | |
| 2003–2004 | Beograd | 18 | (1) |
| 2004–2007 | Voždovac | 19 | (0) |
| 2007–2008 | Jedinstvo Bihać | 13 | (5) |
| 2008–2009 | BFC Siófok | 17 | (0) |
| 2009–2010 | Pandurii Târgu Jiu | 1 | (0) |
| 2010–2011 | Čukarički | 1 | (0) |
| 2011 | Kozara Gradiška | 12 | (1) |
| 2012–2013 | Radnik Bijeljina | 27 | (9) |
| 2013 | Tractor Sazi | 4 | (0) |
| 2014 | Zrinjski Mostar | 6 | (1) |
| 2015–2016 | Vitez | 25 | (4) |
| 2016 | Zemun | 11 | (1) |
| 2016–2017 | Žarkovo | | |
| 2017 | BSK Borča | 9 | (0) |
| 2017–2019 | OFK Beograd | 33 | (10) |
| 2019–2020 | Radnički Novi Beograd | | |
- * Club domestic league appearances and goals as of 5 March 2019

Marko Basara (Serbian Cyrillic: Марко Басара; born July 27, 1984) is a Serbian retired footballer who played as a midfielder.

== Career ==
He had previously played with Serbian clubs FK Teleoptik, FK Beograd, FK Voždovac, FK Čukarički, Bosnian NK Jedinstvo Bihać, FK Kozara Gradiška, FK Radnik Bijeljina, Hungarian BFC Siófok, Romanian CS Pandurii Târgu Jiu and Iranian Tractor Sazi F.C.
