= István Gajda =

Hungarian footballer

Personal information
- Full name: István Gajda
- Date of birth: 6 June 1981
- Place of birth: Budapest, Hungary
- Date of death: 26 November 2011 (aged 30)
- Place of death: M7 motorway, near Pákozd, Hungary
- Height: 1.84 m (6 ft 1/2 in)
- Position: Forward

Youth career
- 1995–1999: Ferencvárosi TC

Senior career*
Years	Team	Apps	(Gls)
1999–2002	Ferencvárosi TC	4	(1)
2000–2001	Lombard-Pápa TFC	?	(?)
2001–2002	Celldömölki VSE	?	(?)
2002–2003	Lombard-Pápa TFC	28	(7)
2003–2005	Diósgyőri VTK	6	(0)
2004	→ AC Oulu (loan)	?	(?)
2005–2006	BFC Siófok	24	(12)
2006–2007	Budapest Honvéd FC	4	(0)
2007–2009	BFC Siófok	44	(7)
2009	→ Kaposvölgye VSC (loan)	6	(0)
2009–2010	Szigetszentmiklósi TK	6	(0)
2010–2011	BKV Előre SC	14	(2)
2011	Békéscsabai SE	6	(0)
2011	Maglódi TC	10	(11)

International career
1996–1997	Hungary U-15	4	(2)
1998–1999	Hungary U-17	4	(0)
- * Club domestic league appearances and goals as of 10 July 2012

István Gajda (born 6 June 1981 in Budapest – 26 November 2011 in Pákozd) was a Hungarian football player, his latest club was Békéscsaba 1912 Előre SE.

== Death ==
On 26 November 2011 Gajda, his brother and a friend headed home after Udinese – Roma Italian Cup match, on the M7 motorway near Pákozd, when their car crashed into a truck. The player was asleep in the back seat without a seatbelt, was thrown out from the vehicle and died instantly.
