= Roland Lipcsei =

Hungarian footballer

Personal information
- Full name: Roland Lipcsei
- Date of birth: 19 January 1984 (age 42)
- Place of birth: Szarvas, Hungary
- Height: 1.89 m (6 ft 2 in)
- Position: Midfielder

Team information
- Current team: Budaörsi SC
- Number: 15

Senior career*
Years	Team	Apps	(Gls)
2002–2005	BFC Siófok	36	(4)
2005–2009	MTK Budapest FC	18	(0)
2007–2009	→ BFC Siófok (loan)	15	(0)
2009	Jászberényi SE	10	(0)
2009–2011	Rákospalotai EAC	28	(2)
2011–	Budaörsi SC	7	(0)

International career
1998–1999	Hungary U-14	3	(0)
1999–2000	Hungary U-15	7	(0)
- * Club domestic league appearances and goals as of 10 July 2012

Roland Lipcsei (born 19 January 1984 in Szarvas) is a Hungarian football (midfielder) player who currently plays for Budaörsi SC.
