= László Sütő =

Hungarian footballer

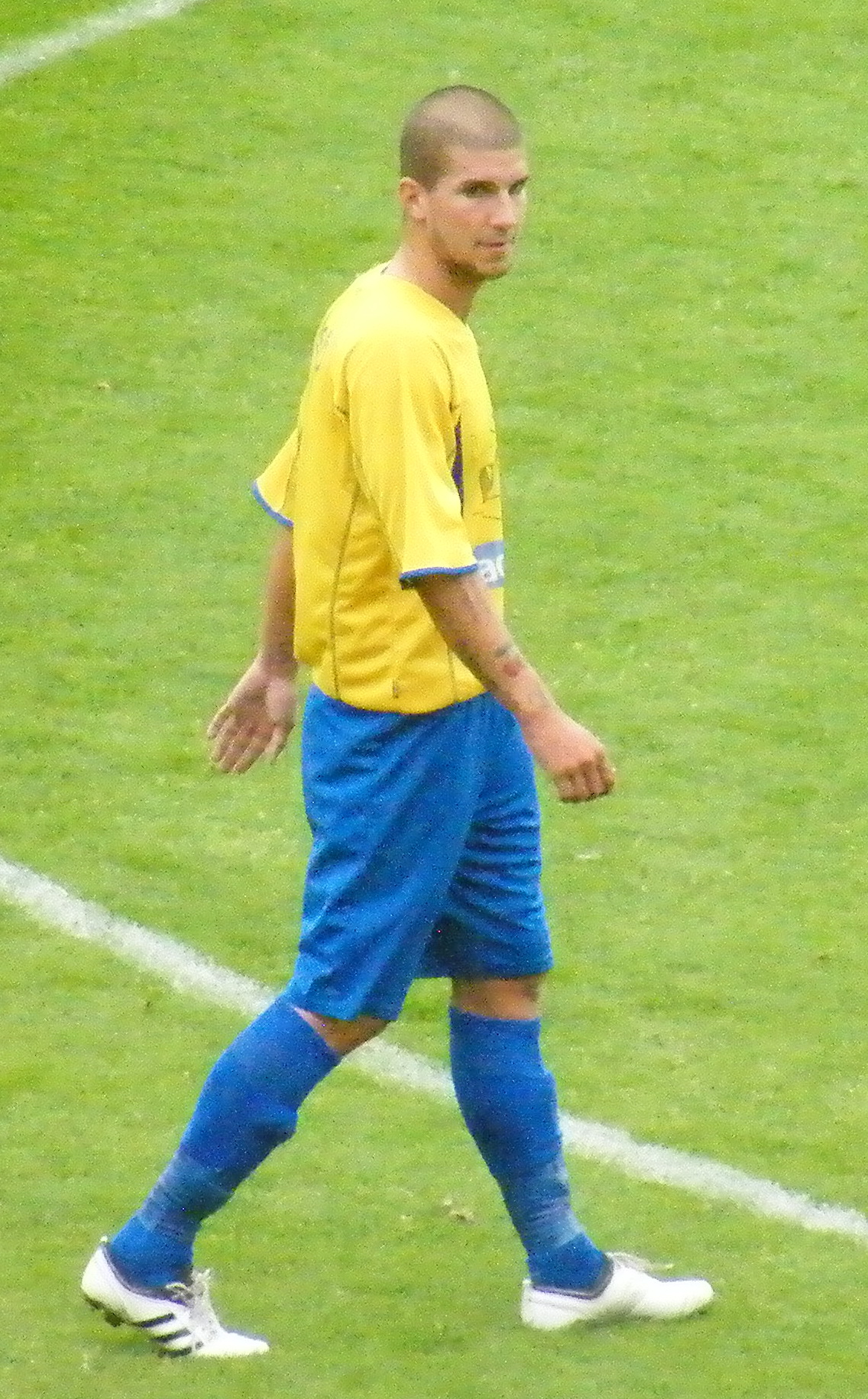

Personal information
- Full name: László Sütő
- Date of birth: 18 April 1986 (age 40)
- Place of birth: Szombathely, Hungary
- Height: 1.88 m (6 ft 2 in)
- Position: Defender

Senior career*
Years	Team	Apps	(Gls)
2004–2012	MTK Hungária FC	27	(2)
2004–2009	→ BFC Siófok (loan)	66	(5)
2009–2010	→ Pécsi MFC (loan)	22	(1)
2011–2012	→ Vasas SC (loan)	11	(0)

International career
2002–2003	Hungary U-17	5	(0)
2004–2005	Hungary U-19	3	(0)
2007–2008	Hungary U-21	0	(0)
- * Club domestic league appearances and goals as of 6 November 2011

László Sütő (born 18 April 1986 in Szombathely, Hungary) is a Hungarian football (defender) player.
