= András László (footballer) =

Hungarian footballer

Personal information
- Full name: András László
- Date of birth: 16 August 1976 (age 50)
- Place of birth: Veszprém, Hungary
- Height: 1.76 m (5 ft 9 in)
- Position: Defender

Senior career*
Years	Team	Apps	(Gls)
1996–1999	BFC Siófok	73	(0)
1997	→ Soproni FAC (loan)	14	(1)
1999–2001	Vasas SC	38	(1)
2001–2004	BFC Siófok	40	(1)
2004–2005	Debreceni VSC	10	(0)
2005–2006	Zalaegerszegi TE	15	(1)
2006	FC Sopron	13	(0)
2006–2007	Budapest Honvéd FC	15	(2)
2007–2011	BFC Siófok	54	(2)
Total		272	(8)
- * Club domestic league appearances and goals

András László (born 16 August 1976) is a Hungarian former football defender who last played for BFC Siófok.
