= Bence Horváth (footballer) =

Hungarian footballer

Personal information
- Full name: Bence Horváth
- Date of birth: 22 June 1986 (age 40)
- Place of birth: Miskolc, Hungary
- Height: 1.80 m (5 ft 11 in)
- Position: Forward

Team information
- Current team: Dél-Balaton FC

Youth career
- 2002–2004: Diósgyőr
- 2004–2005: Siófok

Senior career*
Years	Team	Apps	(Gls)
2005–2009	Siófok	57	(4)
2009–2011	St. Pölten		
2011–2015	Siófok	34	(1)
2015	Balatonfüred	12	(3)
2015–2018	Balatoni Vasas SE	71	(12)
2018–	Dél-Balaton FC	44	(40)
- * Club domestic league appearances and goals as of 20:34, 15 March 2020 (UTC)

Bence Horváth (born 12 June 1986) is a Hungarian football (forward) player who currently plays for Dél-Balaton FC.

== Career statistics ==
Appearances and goals by club, season and competition
Club	Season	League			Cup		League Cup		Europe		Total	
Club	Season	Division	Apps	Goals	Apps	Goals	Apps	Goals	Apps	Goals	Apps	Goals
Siófok
Siófok	2005–06	Nemzeti Bajnokság II	25	3	0	0	0	0	0	0	25	3
Siófok	2006–07	Nemzeti Bajnokság II	28	1	0	0	0	0	0	0	28	1
Siófok	2007–08	Nemzeti Bajnokság I	4	0	0	0	10	1	0	0	14	1
Siófok	2008–09	Nemzeti Bajnokság I	0	0	2	0	5	0	0	0	7	0
Siófok	2011–12	Nemzeti Bajnokság I	9	0	2	0	6	0	0	0	17	0
Siófok	2012–13	Nemzeti Bajnokság I	12	0	2	0	4	1	0	0	18	1
Siófok	2013–14	Nemzeti Bajnokság II	13	1	2	0	5	1	0	0	20	2
Siófok	Total		91	5	8	0	30	3	0	0	129	8
Career total			91	5	8	0	30	3	0	0	129	8

Updated to games played as of 1 March 2014.
