= András Forgács =

Hungarian footballer

Personal information
- Full name: András Forgács
- Date of birth: 28 August 1985 (age 41)
- Place of birth: Budapest, Hungary
- Height: 1.92 m (6 ft 4 in)
- Position: Centre back

Team information
- Current team: Budaörs

Youth career
- 1992–1997: Margitsziget
- 1997–2002: MTK
- 2002–2003: Honvéd
- 2003–2004: Diósgyőr

Senior career*
Years	Team	Apps	(Gls)
2004–2005	Honvéd	1	(0)
2005–2011	Siófok	88	(4)
2009–2011	→ Tatabánya (loan)	22	(3)
2011–2012	Baja	42	(4)
2012–2014	Balmazújváros	57	(5)
2014–2018	ZTE	107	(8)
2018–2019	Mosonmagyaróvár	35	(3)
2019–	Budaörs	10	(0)
- * Club domestic league appearances and goals as of 18:39, 20 November 2019 (UTC)

András Forgács (born 28 August 1985, in Budapest) is a Hungarian football (defender) player who currently plays for Budaörsi SC.
