= Szabolcs Kanta =

Hungarian footballer

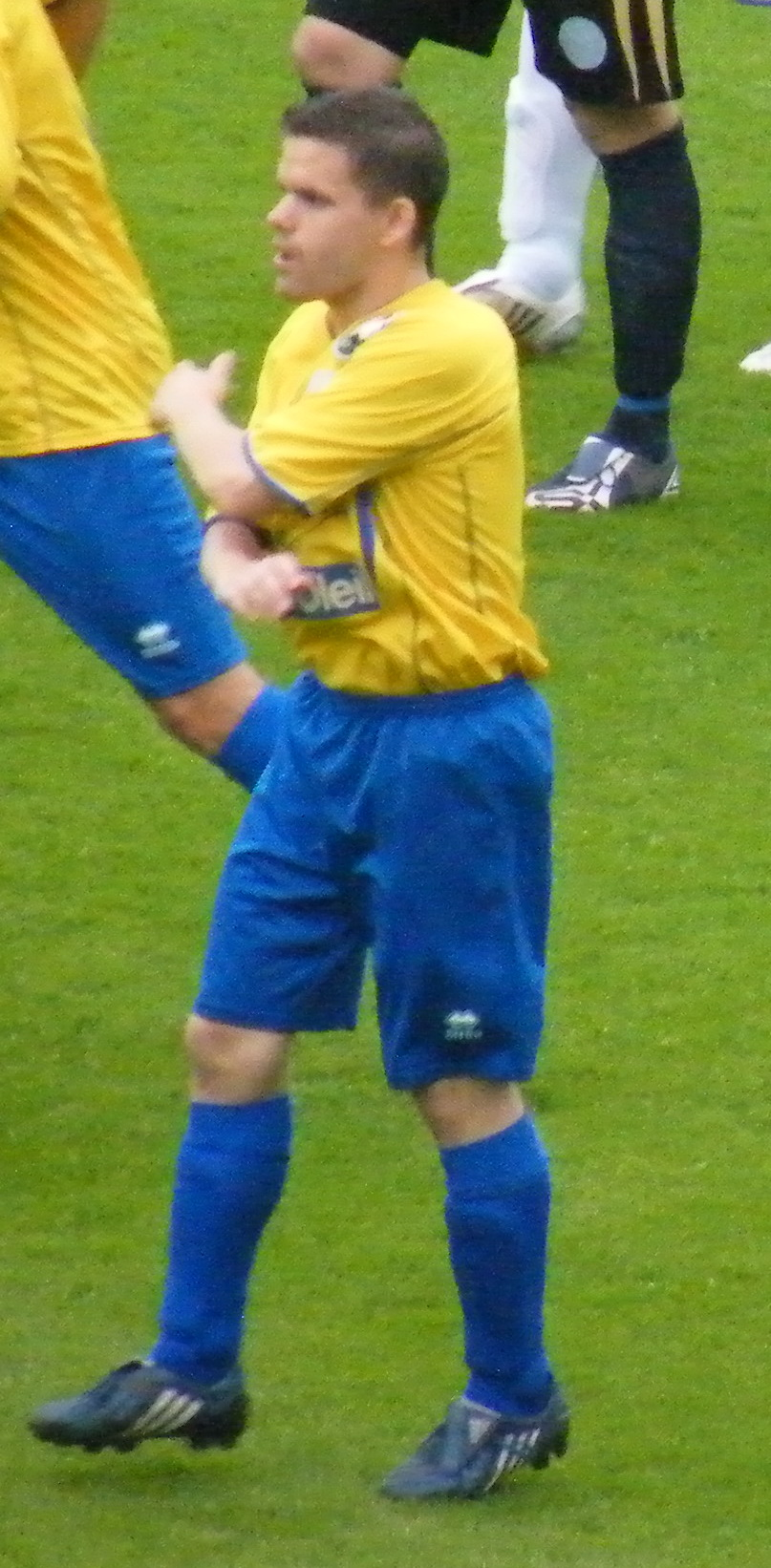

Personal information
- Date of birth: 29 January 1982 (age 44)
- Place of birth: Ajka, Hungary
- Height: 1.67 m (5 ft 6 in)
- Position: Midfielder

Youth career
- 1996–2000: Ajka

Senior career*
Years	Team	Apps	(Gls)
2000–2002	MTK	16	(0)
2002–2004	Siófok	32	(8)
2004–2007	MTK	12	(0)
2005–2007	→ Nyíregyháza (loan)	30	(6)
2007–2012	Siófok	91	(12)
2012–2014	Ajka	41	(2)
2014–2016	Balatonlelle		

International career
1996–1997	Hungary U-14	2	(1)
1998–1999	Hungary U-16	12	(2)
1999–2000	Hungary U-17	11	(1)
- * Club domestic league appearances and goals

Szabolcs Kanta (born 29 January 1982) is a Hungarian former football midfielder.
