= Zoltán Fülöp =

Hungarian footballer

Personal information
- Full name: Zoltán Fülöp
- Date of birth: 26 July 1976 (age 50)
- Place of birth: Csorvás, Hungary
- Height: 1.86 m (6 ft 1 in)
- Position: Forward

Senior career*
Years	Team	Apps	(Gls)
1997–1998	Békéscsaba 1912 Előre SE	16	(2)
1998–2002	Ferencvárosi TC	34	(4)
2000–2001	→ Nyíregyháza Spartacus (loan)	14	(1)
2002–2003	BFC Siófok	27	(9)
2003–2005	SV Mattersburg	19	(4)
2005–2006	FC Sopron	10	(0)
2006–2007	Hapoel Nazareth		
2007	Hapoel Ashkelon		
2007–2008	BFC Siófok	26	(6)
2008–2010	SKU Amstetten		
2010–2015	DSG Union Perg		
- * Club domestic league appearances and goals

Zoltán Fülöp (born 26 July 1976) is a Hungarian retired football (forward) player.
