= József Magasföldi =

Hungarian footballer

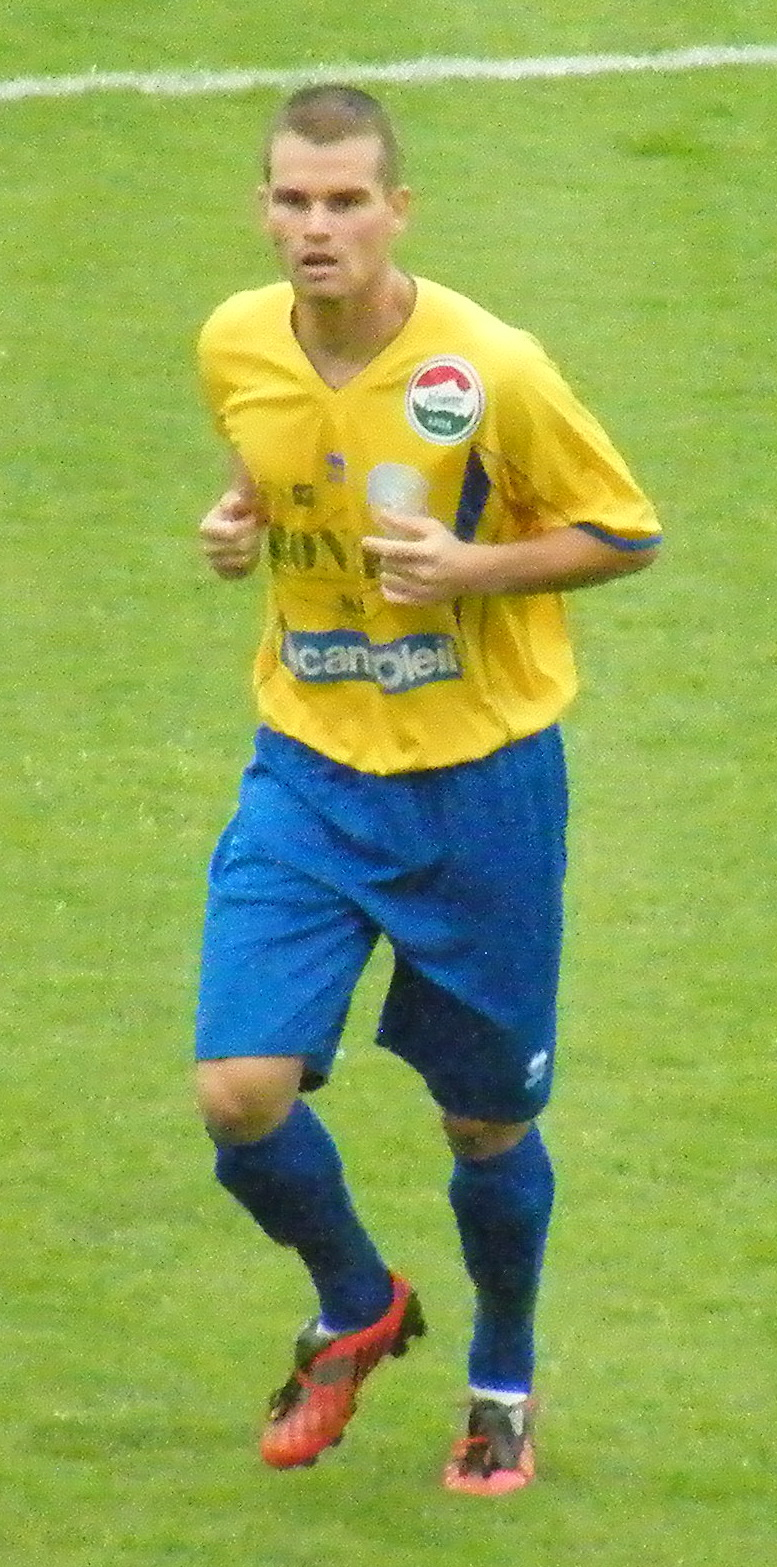

Personal information
- Date of birth: 10 November 1984 (age 42)
- Place of birth: Székesfehérvár, Hungary
- Height: 1.81 m (5 ft 11 in)
- Position: Forward

Team information
- Current team: Puskás Akadémia II

Senior career*
Years	Team	Apps	(Gls)
2001–2006	Videoton	58	(10)
2006	Slovan Liberec	3	(0)
2006–2007	Sopron	27	(6)
2007–2008	Budapest Honvéd	13	(0)
2008–2009	Siófok	46	(15)
2009–2010	Zalaegerszeg	40	(7)
2010–2012	Paks	54	(8)
2012–2015	Gyirmót	86	(30)
2015–2016	Dunaújváros	13	(4)
2016	Mosonmagyaróvári TE	7	(2)
2016–2019	Győr	78	(29)
2019–2020	Siófok	36	(9)
2020–2020	Puskás Akadémia II	0	(0)
- * Club domestic league appearances and goals

József Magasföldi (born 10 November 1984 in Székesfehérvár) is a retired Hungarian football striker.

He has played for Videoton FC, BFC Siófok, MFC Sopron, Budapest Honvéd FC and Paksi SE in Hungary and FC Slovan Liberec in Czech Republic. In February 2020, 35-year old Magasföldi retired.
