= Révész Géza utcai Stadion =

Stadium in Siófok, Hungary

Coordinates: 46°54′33″N 18°3′41″E

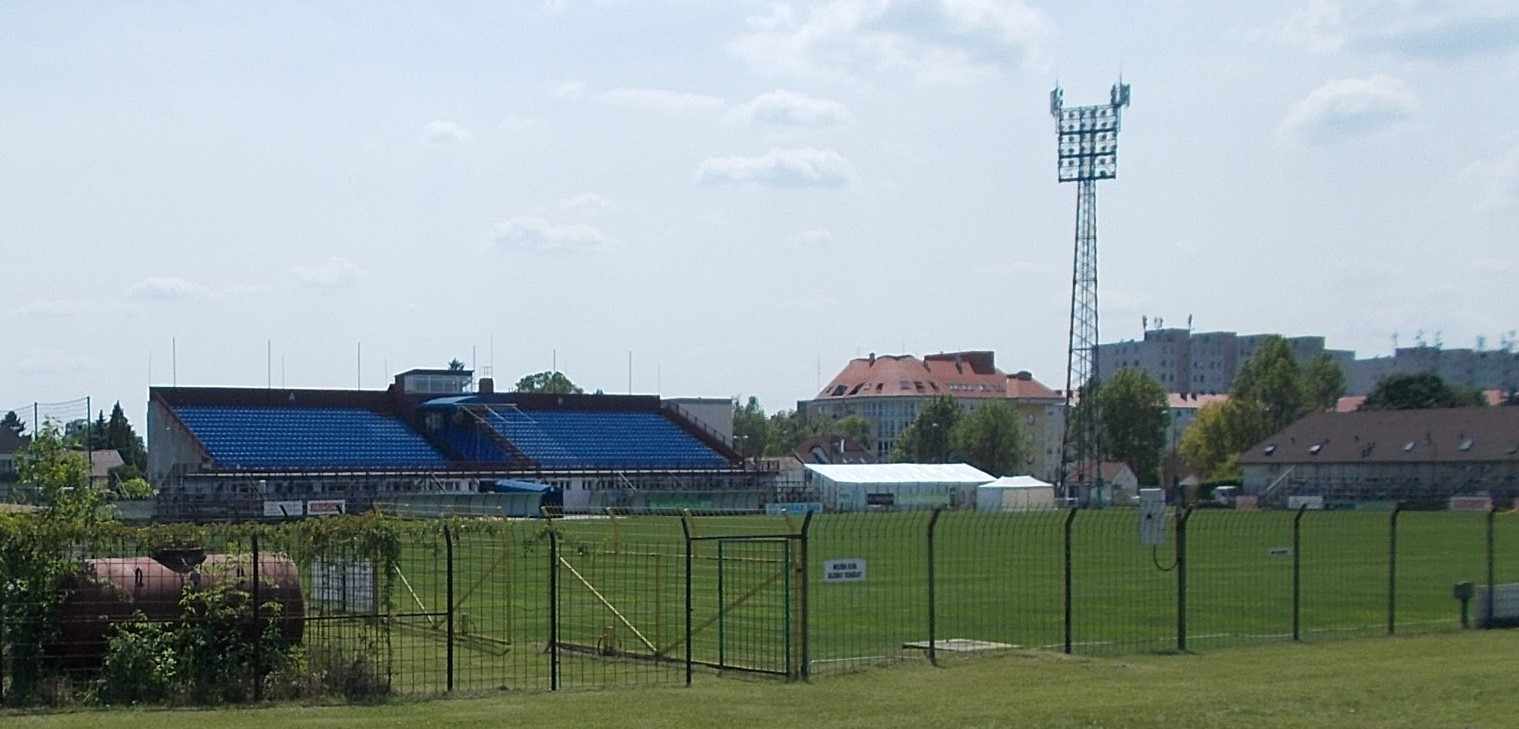
- Interactive map of Révész Géza utcai Stadion
- Full name: Révész Géza utcai Stadion
- Location: Siófok, Hungary
- Owner: BFC Siófok
- Capacity: 6,500
- Surface: Grass; Field
- Field size: 105 m × 68 m (344 ft × 223 ft)

Construction
- Groundbreaking: 1961
- Built: 1961
- Opened: 1961

Tenant
- BFC Siófok

Website
- www.magyarfutball.hu

Révész Géza utcai Stadion (Hungarian: Révész Géza utcai Stadion) is a multi-use stadium in Siófok, Hungary. It is currently used mostly for football matches and is the home stadium of BFC Siófok. The stadium is able to hold 6,500 people. The stadium was named after Géza Révesz Street (Révész Géza utca) while the street was named after politician Géza Révész (1878-1955) born in Siófok.
