= 2008–09 Győri ETO FC season =

Győr
2008–09 season
- Owner: Csaba Tarsoly
- Manager: Sándor Egervári (until 4 December 2008); Dragoljub Bekvalac (from 10 December)
- Stadium: ETO Park
- Nemzeti Bajnokság I: 8th
- Magyar Kupa: Runners-up
- Ligakupa: Semi-finals
- UEFA Cup: Second qualifying round
- Highest home attendance: 12,000 v Vasas (1 May 2009, Nemzeti Bajnokság I)
- Lowest home attendance: 150 v Pápa (7 February 2009, Ligakupa)
- Average home league attendance: 3,253
- Biggest win: 7–0 v Kazincbarcika (Home, 18 March 2009, Magyar Kupa)
- Biggest defeat: 0–4 v Pápa (Home, 7 February 2009, Ligakupa)

The 2008–09 season was Győri Egyetértés Torna Osztály Futball Club's 63rd competitive season, 50th consecutive season in the Nemzeti Bajnokság I and 103rd season in existence as a football club. In addition to the domestic league, Győr participated in that season's editions of the Magyar Kupa, the Ligakupa and the UEFA Cup.

== Squad ==
Squad at end of season

Note: Flags indicate national team as defined under FIFA eligibility rules; some limited exceptions apply. Players may hold more than one non-FIFA nationality.

No.	Pos.	Nation	Player
1	GK	SRB	Saša Stevanović
3	DF	HUN	Attila Dorogi
4	DF	SRB	Lazar Stanišić
5	MF	HUN	István Bank
6	DF	ROU	István Berde
7	MF	HUN	Antal Jäkl
8	MF	HUN	György Józsi
9	MF	HUN	Zoltán Böőr
10	FW	GEO	Rati Aleksidze
11	FW	MNE	Bojan Brnović
12	MF	SVK	Mário Bicák
13	MF	HUN	Dávid Pákolicz
14	MF	HUN	Dániel Völgyi
15	DF	HUN	Bence Zámbó
16	FW	EST	Tarmo Kink
17	MF	LTU	Linas Pilibaitis
18	FW	EST	Jarmo Ahjupera
19	FW	HUN	Péter Bajzát
20	MF	HUN	Tibor Nyári

No.	Pos.	Nation	Player
21	MF	HUN	Ádám Dudás
22	DF	SRB	Bojan Neziri
23	FW	HUN	Tibor Tokody
24	GK	HUN	Bence Somodi
26	DF	SRB	Zoran Šupić
28	DF	SRB	Vladimir Đorđević
29	MF	HUN	Tamás Koltai
30	FW	HUN	Imre Csermelyi
31	GK	SVK	Péter Molnár
32	DF	HUN	Péter Stark
33	FW	GAB	Arsène Copa
35	MF	HUN	Máté Kiss
36	MF	HUN	Attila Sánta
49	MF	GEO	David Odikadze
—	DF	HUN	Szilárd Domanyik
—	DF	HUN	Máté Tóth
—	MF	GEO	Teimuraz Sharashenidze
—	MF	HUN	László Varga

== Competitions ==
=== Overview ===
Competition	First match	Last match	Starting round	Final position	Record							
Competition	First match	Last match	Starting round	Final position	Pld	W	D	L	GF	GA	GD	Win %
Nemzeti Bajnokság I	26 July 2008	30 May 2009	Matchday 1	8th	30	11	10	9	57	41	+16	36.67
Magyar Kupa	24 December 2008	26 May 2009	Round of 32	Runners-up	9	5	2	2	24	8	+16	55.56
Ligakupa	1 October 2008	8 April 2009	Group stage	Semi-finals	14	7	2	5	29	25	+4	50.00
UEFA Cup	17 July 2008	28 August 2008	First qualifying round	Second qualifying round	4	1	1	2	5	8	−3	25.00
Total					57	24	15	18	115	82	+33	42.11

Source: Competitions

=== Nemzeti Bajnokság I ===
==== League table ====
Pos	Team	Pld	W	D	L	GF	GA	GD	Pts
6	Fehérvár	30	14	6	10	42	34	+8	48
7	MTK Budapest	30	13	6	11	43	41	+2	45
8	Győr	30	11	10	9	57	41	+16	43
9	Kaposvár	30	11	7	12	51	46	+5	40
10	Vasas	30	11	5	14	42	52	−10	38

Source: soccerway.com
Rules for classification: 1st points; 2nd overall wins; 3rd goal difference; 4th goals scored

==== Results summary ====
Overall								Home						Away					
Pld	W	D	L	GF	GA	GD	Pts	W	D	L	GF	GA	GD	W	D	L	GF	GA	GD
30	11	10	9	57	41	+16	43	8	4	3	34	19	+15	3	6	6	23	22	+1

Source: Hungarian Football Federation

==== Results by round ====
Round	1	2	3	4	5	6	7	8	9	10	11	12	13	14	15	16	17	18	19	20	21	22	23	24	25	26	27	28	29	30
Ground	A	H	A	H	A	H	A	H	A	H	A	A	H	A	H	H	A	H	A	H	A	H	A	H	A	H	H	A	H	A
Result	L	L	L	W	W	W	D	W	L	W	L	L	L	D	D	D	D	W	D	D	D	W	W	W	W	D	L	D	W	L
Position	10	16	16	16	11	7	7	6	7	5	8	9	10	12	13	12	13	11	10	11	11	10	8	6	6	7	8	8	7	8
Points	0	0	0	3	6	9	10	13	13	16	16	16	16	17	18	19	20	23	24	25	26	29	32	35	38	39	39	40	43	43

Source: Matches
A = Away; H = Home; W = Win; D = Draw; L = Loss

==== Matches ====
26 July 2008 1	Haladás	2–1	Győr	Szombathely
20:00 CEST (UTC+2)	Rajos (yellow card) 30'; P. Tóth I 42'; Kuttor 45'; B. Molnár (yellow card) 49'	Report	Šupić (yellow card) 41'; Bicák 50'; Bajzát (yellow card) 65'; Zo. Kovács II (yellow card) 67'	Stadium: Rohonci út Attendance: 6,500; Referee: Ferenc Bede; Assistant referees: Balázs Farkas, Zoltán Szalai; Fourth official: Gábor Oláh

4 August 2008 2	Győr	0–3	Debrecen	Győr
20:00 CEST (UTC+2)	Nikolov (yellow card) 61'; Völgyi (red card) 79'	Report	L. Oláh 23'; I. Szűcs 29', 42'	Stadium: ETO Park; Attendance: 3,000; Referee: Tamás Bognár; Assistant referees: Zsolt Márton, Zsolt Butkai; Fourth official: Gergő Király

17 August 2008 4	Győr	4–2	Rákospalota	Győr
20:00 CEST (UTC+2)	Jäkl (yellow card) 25'; Šupić (yellow card) 46'; Bajzát (yellow card) 58', (goal) 62', 89', 90+3'; Zo. Kovács I 71'; A. Pintér (yellow card) 81'	Report	Dancs 44', (yellow card) 65'; Erős (yellow card) 58'; Nyerges (yellow card) 66'; Lisztes 76'; G. Horváth I (yellow card) 82'; Szántai (yellow card) 88'	Stadium: ETO Park; Attendance: 2,000; Referee: István Vad; Assistant referees: Vencel Tóth II, Oszkár Lémon; Fourth official: Csaba Molnár

23 August 2008 5	Kaposvár	0–1	Győr	Kaposvár
20:00 CEST (UTC+2)	Bogdán (yellow card) 61'	Report	Bajzát 76'; Pákolicz (red card) 84'	Stadium: Rákóczi Stadion; Attendance: 2,000; Referee: Ádám Németh; Assistant referees: Zsolt Márton, Attila Beidek; Fourth official: Attila Éreth

31 August 2008 6	Győr	4–1	Honvéd	Győr
17:30 CEST (UTC+2)	Koltai 11', (yellow card) 38'; Bajzát 34', 76', 81'; Zo. Kovács I (yellow card) 43'; Tokody (yellow card) 58'; Copa (yellow card) 83'	Report	Smiljanić 8'; Hercegfalvi (yellow card) 43'; Maróti (yellow card) 83'	Stadium: ETO Park; Attendance: 3,000; Referee: Mihály Fábián; Assistant referees: Dr. Zsolt Varga, Zoltán Pápai; Fourth official: Róbert Nagy

7 September 2008 3	Kecskemét	1–0	Győr	Kecskemét
18:00 CEST (UTC+2)	Alempijević (yellow card) 45'; Mbengono 83'	Report	Tokody (yellow card) 68'; Böőr (yellow card) 81'	Stadium: Széktói Stadion; Attendance: 3,600; Referee: István Mészáros; Assistant referees: László Viszokai, Zoltán Kis; Fourth official: Dániel Becséri
Note: The match was postponed from the weekend of 8-10 August 2008, due to Győr's team being diagnosed with viral infections.

13 September 2008 7	MTK	1–1	Győr	Budapest
15:00 CEST (UTC+2)	Lambulić 49' (pen.); G. Nagy II (yellow card) 56'; Pátkai (yellow card) 78'; Kecskés (yellow card) 89'	Report	A. Pintér (yellow card) 17'; Zo. Kovács I 34'; Böőr (yellow card) 90'	Stadium: Hidegkuti Nándor Stadion; Attendance: 700; Referee: Zoltán Iványi; Assistant referees: István Albert, János Medovarszki; Fourth official: Tibor Csatári

20 September 2008 8	Győr	6–0	Diósgyőr	Győr
19:00 CEST (UTC+2)	Stark 10' (pen.); Zo. Kovács I 19', 45'; Bajzát 44', 55'; Völgyi 50'; Tokody (yellow card) 70'	Report	Stanić (yellow card) 28'; Miličić (yellow card) 57'	Stadium: ETO Park; Attendance: 1,800; Referee: Viktor Kassai; Assistant referees: Péter Berettyán, Lajos L. Tóth; Fourth official: Csaba Sándor

27 September 2008 9	Paks	2–1	Győr	Paks
19:00 CEST (UTC+2)	Éger 58' (pen.), 90' (pen.); Kriston (yellow card) 77'	Report	Józsi 8'; Völgyi (yellow card) 58'	Stadium: Fehérvári úti Stadion; Attendance: 3,500; Referee: Tamás Arany; Assistant referees: Szabolcs Deutsch, Arnold Kepe; Fourth official: Dániel Becséri

5 October 2008 10	Győr	1–0	Zalaegerszeg	Győr
17:30 CEST (UTC+2)	Bank (red card) 11'; Bicák 90+2', (yellow card) 90+3'	Report	G. Kovács (yellow card) 62'; Méyé (red card) 82'; Szamosi (yellow card) 86'	Stadium: ETO Park; Attendance: 1,500; Referee: Zsolt Szabó; Assistant referees: Róbert Kispál, Dr. Zsolt Varga; Fourth official: Dr. Ádám Szanyi

17 October 2008 11	Vasas	2–1	Győr	Budapest
19:00 CEST (UTC+2)	Dobrić (yellow card) 47'; N. Németh 61'; A. Tóth 78'	Report	Bajzát 4'; Völgyi (yellow card) 42'; Fomumbod (yellow card) 63'	Stadium: Illovszky Rudolf Stadion; Attendance: 1,200; Referee: Zoltán Iványi; Assistant referees: István Albert, János Medovarszki; Fourth official: Gergely Szőts

25 October 2008 12	Fehérvár	3–2	Győr	Székesfehérvár
18:00 CEST (UTC+2)	Sitku 3' (pen.), 64', (yellow card) 59'; Pavličić 39'; G. Horváth II (yellow card) 45'	Report	Bajzát 29' (pen.), (yellow card) 45'; Bicák (yellow card) 41'; Józsi 47'; Zámbó (yellow card) 63'	Stadium: Sóstói Stadion; Attendance: 1,765; Referee: István Vad; Assistant referees: Vencel Tóth II, István Tóth; Fourth official: Dr. Ádám Szanyi

1 November 2008 13	Győr	0–1	Nyíregyháza	Győr
18:00 CET (UTC+1)		Report	Ramos (yellow card) 59'; Stojkov 60'	Stadium: ETO Park; Attendance: 2,200; Referee: József Berger; Assistant referees: Attila Forgács, Balázs Huszár; Fourth official: Csaba Pintér

7 November 2008 14	Újpest	1–1	Győr	Budapest
17:30 CET (UTC+1)	Šupić 2' (o.g.); Rajczi (yellow card) 49'; Kabát (yellow card) 69'; Bori (yellow card) 84'	Report	Tokody 20'; Völgyi (yellow card) 55'; Zámbó (red card) 76'; Bicák (yellow card) 81'	Stadium: Szusza Ferenc Stadion; Attendance: 5,500; Referee: István Mészáros; Assistant referees: Róbert Kispál, György Ring; Fourth official: Balázs Lak

15 November 2008 15	Győr	0–0	Siófok	Győr
18:00 CET (UTC+1)	Tokody (yellow card) 35'	Report	S. Kanta (yellow card) 89'	Stadium: ETO Park; Attendance: 1,600; Referee: Szabolcs Szilasi; Assistant referees: Tibor Vámos, Zoltán Szalai; Fourth official: Tibor Farkas

8 March 2009 18	Győr	2–0	Kecskemét	Győr
17:30 CET (UTC+1)	Kink 15'; Stark (yellow card) 31', (goal) 77' (pen.); Stanišić (yellow card) 75'	Report	Alempijević (yellow card) 53'; Čukić (red card) 76'	Stadium: ETO Park; Attendance: 2,500; Referee: István Mészáros; Assistant referees: Vencel Tóth II, Balázs Huszár; Fourth official: Csaba Pintér

14 March 2009 19	Rákospalota	0–0	Győr	Budapest
18:00 CET (UTC+1)	Ambrusz (yellow card) 42'; Zo. Kovács II (red card) 89'; B. Kovács (yellow card) 90'	Report	Bajzát (yellow card) 14'; Stark (yellow card) 61'	Stadium: Budai II. László Stadion; Attendance: 800; Referee: Roland Veizer; Assistant referees: Péter Berettyán, Zsolt Márton; Fourth official: Gergő Király

21 March 2009 20	Győr	1–1	Kaposvár	Győr
18:00 CET (UTC+1)	Bajzát 14'; Stanišić (yellow card) 78'; Völgyi (yellow card) 85'	Report	Gujić (yellow card) 7'; Petrók (yellow card) 51'; Zsolnai 76'; Pest (yellow card) 78'	Stadium: ETO Park; Attendance: 2,000; Referee: Ádám Németh; Assistant referees: Zsolt Butkai, Zoltán Szalai; Fourth official: Gergely Szőts

3 April 2009 21	Honvéd	0–0	Győr	Budapest
19:00 CEST (UTC+2)	Dobos (yellow card) 49'; Fazakas (red card) 78'	Report	Stark (yellow card) 76'	Stadium: Bozsik József Stadion; Attendance: 1,500; Referee: Mihály Fábián; Assistant referees: Dr. Zsolt Varga, Gyula Ortó; Fourth official: Róbert Nagy

10 April 2009 22	Győr	3–1	MTK	Győr
19:00 CEST (UTC+2)	Józsi (yellow card) 28'; Brnović 40', 63', 66'; Bicák (yellow card) 60'; Stark (yellow card) 83'; Völgyi (yellow card) 90'	Report	Melczer (yellow card) 54'; J. Kanta 84' (pen.)	Stadium: ETO Park; Attendance: 2,000; Referee: Viktor Kassai; Assistant referees: Tibor Vámos, Gábor Erős; Fourth official: Gergő Király

18 April 2009 23	Diósgyőr	2–3	Győr	Miskolc
19:00 CEST (UTC+2)	Mi. Tóth 32'; Kamber (yellow card) 70'; Stanić 72'	Report	Bajzát 6', 87'; Nyári (yellow card) 18'; Kink (yellow card) 31'; Jäkl (yellow card) 54', (goal) 66'; Stark (yellow card) 77'; Stevanović (yellow card) 82'; Aleksidze (yellow card) 85'	Stadium: Diósgyőri Stadion; Attendance: 4,000; Referee: Zoltán Iványi; Assistant referees: István Albert, Péter Berettyán; Fourth official: Gábor Bendik

25 April 2009 24	Győr	4–1	Paks	Győr
19:00 CEST (UTC+2)	Kink 26'; Brnović 36'; Bajzát 43', 49'; Stanišić (red card) 58'; Dorogi (yellow card) 60'	Report	Zováth (yellow card) 27'; A. Pintér 33'; Böde (yellow card) 39'; Pandur (yellow card) 48'; J. Szabó (yellow card) 87'	Stadium: ETO Park; Attendance: 2,000; Referee: József Berger; Assistant referees: Attila Forgács, Zoltán Kovács; Fourth official: Krisztián Király

28 April 2009 25	Zalaegerszeg	2–7	Győr	Zalaegerszeg
19:00 CEST (UTC+2)	Alomerović 9'; Waltner 28'; Miljatovič (red card) 56'	Report	Józsi 3', 58'; Völgyi (yellow card) 39'; Bajzát 47', 65', 75'; Bank (yellow card) 55'; Böőr 60'; Aleksidze 79'	Stadium: ZTE Arena; Attendance: 4,096; Referee: Sándor Andó-Szabó; Assistant referees: Vencel Tóth II, Balázs Huszár; Fourth official: Csaba Pintér

1 May 2009 26	Győr	1–1	Vasas	Győr
19:00 CEST (UTC+2)	Aleksidze 3'; Böőr (yellow card) 73'; Bajzát (yellow card) 87'; Stark (yellow card) 90'	Report	Dobrić (yellow card) 32'; B. Tóth (yellow card) 47'; Vujović (yellow card) 57', (goal) 81'	Stadium: ETO Park; Attendance: 12,000; Referee: Péter Solymosi; Assistant referees: Arnold Kepe, Szabolcs Deutsch; Fourth official: Norbert Kiss

6 May 2009 17	Debrecen	2–2	Győr	Debrecen
19:00 CEST (UTC+2)	Czvitkovics 7', (yellow card) 36'; Bernáth (red card) 36'; P. Szakály 72'; Dombi (yellow card) 90'	Report	Aleksidze 27'; Józsi (yellow card) 52'; Bicák (yellow card) 56'; Šupić (yellow card) 89'; Böőr 90+1'	Stadium: Oláh Gábor utcai Stadion; Attendance: 4,000; Referee: Mihály Fábián; Assistant referees: Dr. Zsolt Varga, Tamás Márkus; Fourth official: Róbert Nagy
Note: The matches of the 17th round were postponed due to HFF decision.

9 May 2009 27	Győr	1–2	Fehérvár	Győr
19:00 CEST (UTC+2)	M. Kiss (yellow card) 12'; Copa 40'; Zámbó (yellow card) 65'; Jäkl (yellow card) 68'; Stanišić (yellow card) 73'	Report	Vujović 16'; Lázár (yellow card) 32'; Alves (yellow card) 67'; G. Horváth II (yellow card) 79'; Silva 82'	Stadium: ETO Park; Attendance: 3,200; Referee: Zoltán Iványi; Assistant referees: Zsolt Szpisják, István Albert; Fourth official: Gábor Oláh

13 May 2009 16	Győr	3–3	Haladás	Győr
19:00 CEST (UTC+2)	Bajzát 27'; Bicák (yellow card) 40'; Kink 46'; Aleksidze 77'	Report	N. Sipos 61', 90+1', (yellow card) 90+1'; Csontos 90+2'	Stadium: ETO Park; Attendance: 6,000; Referee: Tamás Arany; Assistant referees: Gábor Erős, Zsolt Butkai; Fourth official: Dániel Becséri

16 May 2009 28	Nyíregyháza	1–1	Győr	Nyíregyháza
19:00 CEST (UTC+2)	Minczér 68', (yellow card) 85'; Zabos (yellow card) 74'	Report	Đorđević (yellow card) 12'; Böőr (yellow card) 20'; Nyári (yellow card) 30'; Zámbó (yellow card) 43'; Csermelyi 61'	Stadium: Városi Stadion; Attendance: 2,000; Referee: József Berger; Assistant referees: Attila Forgács, János Medovarszki; Fourth official: Gábor Fajkusz

23 May 2009 29	Győr	4–3	Újpest	Győr
15:00 CEST (UTC+2)	Brnović 24'; Božić 42' (o.g.); M. Kiss 58'; Dorogi (yellow card) 71'; Aleksidze 89'	Report	Tisza 13'; A. Simon I 17'; Božić (yellow card) 35'; Pollák 41'; Stokes (yellow card) 64'; Bori (yellow card) 88'	Stadium: ETO Park; Attendance: 4,000; Referee: Sándor Andó-Szabó; Assistant referees: Vencel Tóth II, Balázs Farkas; Fourth official: Gergő Janitz

30 May 2009 30	Siófok	3–2	Győr	Siófok
19:00 CEST (UTC+2)	Bojtor 5'; Ribeiro (yellow card) 15'; Magasföldi 27'; Ivancsics (yellow card) 45'; M. Takács 56'; S. Kanta (yellow card) 64'; Tusori (yellow card) 76'	Report	Bicák (yellow card) 20'; Völgyi (yellow card) 35'; Aleksidze 65', 87'; Stark (yellow card) 81'	Stadium: Révész Géza utcai Stadion; Attendance: 200; Referee: János Takács; Assistant referees: Lajos L. Tóth, János Demeter; Fourth official: Gábor Bendik

=== Magyar Kupa ===
24 September 2008 Round of 32	Pécs	0–5	Győr	Pécs
19:00 CEST (UTC+2)	A. Nagy (yellow card) 71'	Report	Zo. Kovács II (red card) 15'; Brnović 28', 56'; Völgyi (yellow card) 35'; Zo. Kovács I 42', 56'; Pákolicz 80'	Stadium: Stadion PMFC; Attendance: 1,000; Referee: Péter Solymosi; Assistant referees: Oszkár Lémon, Gábor Takács

==== Round of 16 ====
10 October 2008 First leg	Haladás	3–2	Győr	Szombathely
18:00 CEST (UTC+2)	Zs. Kovács (yellow card) 24', (goal) 77'; N. Sipos (yellow card) 29'; Oross (yellow card) 70'	Report	Böőr 18'; Stark 32' (pen.); Nikolov (yellow card) 53'; Bank (yellow card) 58'	Stadium: Rohonci út Attendance: 3,500; Referee: Péter Solymosi; Assistant referees: Vencel Tóth II, László Viszokai

22 October 2008 Second leg	Győr	4–0 (6–3 agg.)	Haladás	Győr
18:00 CEST (UTC+2)	Bank 14'; Józsi 24'; Böőr 71'; Šupić (yellow card) 75'; Brnović (yellow card) 86'; Bajzát 90+1'	Report	Maikel (yellow card) 44'; P. Tóth I (yellow card) 60'; Balassa (yellow card) 69'	Stadium: ETO Park; Attendance: 1,800; Referee: Ferenc Bede; Assistant referees: Balázs Farkas, Zsolt Márton
Note: Győr won 6–3 on aggregate.

==== Quarter-finals ====
11 March 2009 First leg	Kazincbarcika	1–2	Győr	Kazincbarcika
14:30 CET (UTC+1)	R. Kovács (yellow card) 43'; D. Olasz 45'; Debreczeni (yellow card) 90'	Report	Stark (yellow card) 28'; Kink 49', (yellow card) 67'; Đorđević (yellow card) 54'; Bajzát 68'; Stanišić (yellow card) 73'	Stadium: Kazincbarcikai Sportközpont; Attendance: 1,000; Referee: József Berger; Assistant referees: Attila Forgács, Tibor Vígh

18 March 2009 Second leg	Győr	7–0 (9–1 agg.)	Kazincbarcika	Győr
18:00 CET (UTC+1)	Pilibaitis 23'; Józsi 25'; Stark 31' (pen.); Bajzát 39'; Aleksidze 57', 78'; Đorđević (yellow card) 63'; Bicák 73'	Report	Hanász (yellow card) 21'; T. Sebők (yellow card) 71'	Stadium: ETO Park; Attendance: 1,000; Referee: János Takács; Assistant referees: Lajos L. Tóth, Tóbert Horváth
Note: Győr won 9–1 on aggregate.

==== Semi-finals ====
14 April 2009 First leg	Győr	2–1	MTK	Győr
18:00 CEST (UTC+2)	Bajzát 25'; Tokody 34'	Report	Lencse 20'; Zsidai (yellow card) 27'; Melczer (yellow card) 36'; Radulović (yellow card) 74'	Stadium: ETO Park; Attendance: 1,500; Referee: Tamás Arany; Assistant referees: Balázs Farkas, Tibor Vígh

22 April 2009 Second leg	MTK	2–2 (3–4 agg.)	Győr	Budapest
17:00 CEST (UTC+2)	Könyves 16'; Á. Szabó (yellow card) 38'; Á. Pintér (yellow card) 67', (goal) 80'	Report	Böőr 38'; Völgyi (yellow card) 45'; Stanišić (yellow card) 47'; Šupić (yellow card) 84'; Stark 87' (pen.)	Stadium: Hidegkuti Nándor Stadion; Attendance: 800; Referee: Zsolt Szabó; Assistant referees: Attila Kelemen, István Tóth
Note: Győr won 4–3 on aggregate.

==== Final ====
20 May 2009 First leg	Győr	0–1	Honvéd	Győr
18:00 CEST (UTC+2)	Aleksidze (yellow card) 17'; Böőr (yellow card) 20'; Odikadze (yellow card) 47'; Bajzát (yellow card) 67'; Stevanović (yellow card) 90+3'	Report	Smiljanić (yellow card) 20'; Guié 71'; Filó (yellow card) 78'; Maróti (yellow card) 88'	Stadium: ETO Park; Attendance: 11,000; Referee: Szabó; Assistant referees: Tibor Vámos, Gábor Erős; Fourth official: Ádám Németh

26 May 2009 Second leg	Honvéd	0–0 (1–0 agg.)	Győr	Budapest
19:00 CEST (UTC+2)	Hercegfalvi (yellow card) 29'; Smiljanić (yellow card) 48'; Angoua (red card) 83'	Report	Stanišić (yellow card) 30'; Böőr (yellow card) 39'; Šupić (red card) 63'; Stark (yellow card) 86'; Copa (yellow card) 90+2'	Stadium: Bozsik József Stadion; Attendance: 7,000; Referee: Péter Solymosi; Assistant referees: Zsolt Szpisják, Balázs Farkas; Fourth official: Sándor Andó-Szabó
Note: Honvéd won 1–0 on aggregate.

=== Ligakupa ===
==== Group stage ====
Pos	Team	Pld	W	D	L	GF	GA	GD	Pts	Qualification	HAL	GYO	MTK	SIO	BUD	PAP
1	Haladás	10	7	1	2	23	10	+13	22	Advance to knockout phase	—	2–0	2–0	3–0	3–0	5–2
2	Győr	10	5	1	4	23	19	+4	16	Advance to knockout phase	4–0	—	1–1	3–0	6–0	0–4
3	MTK	10	4	3	3	13	17	−4	15		0–0	3–0	—	1–8	1–2	2–1
4	Siófok	10	4	2	4	20	16	+4	14		2–1	4–2	1–2	—	1–2	2–2
5	Budaörs	10	3	1	6	10	22	−12	10		2–5	0–1	0–1	0–2	—	3–1
6	Pápa	10	1	4	5	18	23	−5	7		0–2	5–6	2–2	0–0	1–1	—

Source: HFF

1 October 2008 1	Győr	4–0	Haladás	Győr
15:30 CEST (UTC+2)	Má. Tóth 2'; Brnović 39', 44'; Csermelyi 78'	Report	Zs. Kovács (yellow card) 43'	Stadium: ETO Park; Attendance: 300; Referee: Norbert Kiss; Assistant referees: Balázs Farkas, Gábor Varga Jr.

15 October 2008 2	Budaörs	0–1	Győr	Budaörs
14:00 CEST (UTC+2)	Bálint (yellow card) 39'; Á. Farkas (yellow card) 66'	Report	A. Pintér (yellow card) 23'; Lappints 53'	Stadium: Árok utcai Stadion; Attendance: 150; Referee: Gábor Péter Kovács; Assistant referees: Zoltán Kis, Attila Beidek

29 October 2008 3	Győr	1–1	MTK	Győr
14:00 CET (UTC+1)	Brnović 52'; Zo. Kovács II (yellow card) 74'	Report	Lencse (yellow card) 47'; Szatmári (yellow card) 52'; Ladányi 74'	Stadium: ETO Park; Attendance: 300; Referee: Krisztián Pánczél; Assistant referees: Norbet Kiss, Szabolcs Deutsch

12 November 2008 5	Győr	3–0	Siófok	Győr
13:30 CET (UTC+1)	A. Pintér (yellow card) 40'; M. Kiss (yellow card) 42'; Csermelyi 61'; Fomumbod 73'; Brnović 80'; Zo. Kovács II (yellow card) 83'	Report	Sütő (red card) 85'	Stadium: ETO Park; Attendance: 300; Referee: Tamás Bognár; Assistant referees: Zoltán Kovács, Balázs Huszár

19 November 2008 4	Pápa	5–6	Győr	Pápa
17:00 CET (UTC+1)	Farkas 12', (yellow card) 33'; Z. Szabó 13', (yellow card) 60'; Venczel (yellow card) 21', (goal) 42', 86'; S. Kovács (yellow card) 38'; De Paula (yellow card) 43', (goal) 51'	Report	Zo. Kovács I 2', 8', 55', 59', 82'; Zo. Kovács II (yellow card) 18'; Józsi (yellow card) 45'; Bajzát 56'	Stadium: Perutz Stadion; Attendance: 200; Referee: Tibor Gyarmati II; Assistant referees: Gábor Oláh, Zsolt Buktai

23 November 2008 6	Haladás	2–0	Győr	Szombathely
16:30 CET (UTC+1)	Iszlai (yellow card) 21'; An. Simon II 51', 74'	Report	A. Pintér (yellow card) 18'; Má. Tóth (yellow card) 45'; Fomumbod (yellow card) 53'; Böőr (yellow card) 80'	Stadium: Rohonci út Attendance: 400; Referee: Ferenc Bede; Assistant referees: György Ring, Zsolt Márton

29 November 2008 7	Győr	6–0	Budaörs	Győr
13:00 CET (UTC+1)	Bajzát 25'; Tokody 41', 42'; Šišov 62', 72'; M. Kiss 84'	Report	Lalusz (yellow card) 88'; Kollár (red card) 90'	Stadium: ETO Park; Attendance: 300; Referee: Gergely Sulyok; Assistant referees: Szabolcs Deutsch, Katalin Török

6 December 2008 8	MTK	3–0	Győr	Budapest (Note: The match was played at the Promontor utcai Stadion in Budapest, instead of MTK regular stadium, the Hidegkuti Nándor Stadion.)
13:00 CET (UTC+1)	Hrepka 35'; Hidvégi 53'; Gosztonyi 84'	Report		Stadium: Promontor utcai Stadion; Attendance: 100; Referee: Róbert Nagy; Assistant referees: János Demeter, Tamás Márkus

7 February 2009 9	Győr	0–4	Pápa	Győr
13:00 CET (UTC+1)	Leitold (yellow card) 74'	Report	De Paula 21'; Farkas 58'; Gyömbér 62'; Wansi 79'	Stadium: ETO Park; Attendance: 150; Referee: Ádám Németh; Assistant referees: Vencel Tóth II, Zsolt Butkai

14 February 2009 10	Siófok	4–2	Győr	Siófok
13:00 CET (UTC+1)	Ndjodo 31'; Má. Tóth 53' (o.g.); Magasföldi 54', (yellow card) 61'; Sütő (yellow card) 56'; Andruskó (yellow card) 70'; Koós 83'	Report	Csermelyi (yellow card) 8', (goal) 16'; Berde 27'; P. Molnár (yellow card) 54'; Pákolicz (yellow card) 81'	Stadium: Révész Géza utcai Stadion; Attendance: 150; Referee: Gyöngyi Gaál; Assistant referees: Tibor Vámos, Ferenc Varga

==== Knockout phase ====
===== Quarter-finals =====
4 March 2009 First leg	Győr	3–2	Újpest	Győr
14:30 CET (UTC+1)	Bicák (yellow card) 19'; Pákolicz 25'; M. Kiss 27'; Jäkl (yellow card) 62'; Aleksidze 88'	Report	Privigyei (yellow card) 39'; A. Simon I 51'; Popovics 85'	Stadium: ETO Park; Attendance: 600; Referee: Viktor Kassai; Assistant referees: Gábor Erős, Tibor Vámos

26 March 2009 Second leg	Újpest	1–2 (3–5 agg.)	Győr	Budapest
18:00 CET (UTC+1)	Rajczi (yellow card) 39'; Kabát 82'; Božić (yellow card) 87'	Report	Bicák 15', (yellow card) 16'; Sánta (yellow card) 36', (goal) 45'; Stevanović (yellow card) 39'; Dorogi (yellow card) 44'	Stadium: Szusza Ferenc Stadion; Attendance: 800; Referee: Szabolcs Szilasi; Assistant referees: Róbert Kispál, Gábor Takács
Note: Győr won 5–3 on aggregate.

===== Semi-finals =====
29 March 2009 First leg	Fehérvár	2–0	Győr	Székesfehérvár
17:30 CEST (UTC+2)	Vujović (yellow card) 24'; Lázár (yellow card) 35'; Radović (yellow card) 58', (goal) 64'; Alves 80'	Report	Berde (yellow card) 28'; Bicák (yellow card) 31'; Dorogi (yellow card) 37'; Völgyi (yellow card) 60'; Šupić (red card) 75'	Stadium: Sóstói Stadion; Attendance: 200; Referee: Ferenc Bede; Assistant referees: Zsolt Szpisják, István Albert

8 April 2009 Second leg	Győr	1–1 (1–3 agg.)	Fehérvár	Győr
18:00 CEST (UTC+2)	Völgyi (yellow card) 27'; Copa 46'; Pilibaitis (yellow card) 58'; Zámbó (yellow card) 67'	Report	Alves 61'	Stadium: ETO Park; Attendance: 2,500; Referee: Sándor Andó-Szabó; Assistant referees: Zsolt Butkai, Zoltán Szalai; Fourth official: Gergely Szőts
Note: Fehérvár won 3–1 on aggregate.

=== UEFA Cup ===
==== Qualifying rounds ====
===== First qualifying round =====
17 July 2008 First leg	Győr (Hungary)	1–1	(Georgia (country)) Zestaponi	Győr, Hungary
20:00 CEST (UTC+2)	Böőr (yellow card) 13', (goal) 58'; Stevanović (yellow card) 30'; Bajzát (yellow card) 84'; Völgyi (yellow card) 86'	Report	Gelashvili (yellow card) 34'; Supić 45' (o.g.); Gotsiridze (yellow card) 86'	Stadium: ETO Park; Attendance: 4,010; Referee: Angel Angelov (Bulgaria); Assistant referees: Ivan Valchev (Bulgaria), Veselin Dobriyanov (Bulgaria); Fourth official: Georgi Yordanov (Bulgaria)

31 July 2008 Second leg	Zestaponi (Georgia (country))	1–2 (2–3 agg.)	(Hungary) Győr	Zestaponi, Georgia
18:00 (UTC+5)	Lobjanidze (yellow card) 13' (yellow-red card) 90+3'; Gotsiridze 51'; Daushvili (yellow card) 56'; Gelashvili (yellow card) 61'; Ionanidze (yellow card) 74'	Report	A. Pintér (yellow card) 18' (yellow-red card) 80'; Józsi (yellow card) 40'; Jäkl 52'; Pákolicz 66'	Stadium: Municipal Stadium; Attendance: 3,600; Referee: Anastassios Kakos (Greece); Assistant referees: Konstantinos Dalas (Greece), Spiros Trifonas (Greece); Fourth official: Ilias Mazarakos (Greece)
Note: Győr won 3–2 on aggregate.

===== Second qualifying round =====
14 August 2008 First leg	VfB Stuttgart (Germany)	2–1	(Hungary) Győr	Stuttgart, Germany
18:30 CEST (UTC+2)	Tasci 12'; Marica 31'	Report	Böőr 44'; Jäkl (yellow card) 56'; Pákolicz (yellow card) 88'	Stadium: Mercedes-Benz Arena; Attendance: 11,000; Referee: Paulo Costa (Portugal); Assistant referees: José Ramalho (Portugal), Serafim Baia Nogueira (Portugal); Fourth official: Rui Manuel Gomes Costa (Portugal)

28 August 2008 Second leg	Győr (Hungary)	1–4 (2–6 agg.)	(Germany) VfB Stuttgart	Győr, Hungary
20:30 CEST (UTC+2)	Jäkl (yellow card) 7'; Nikolov (yellow card) 25'; Zo. Kovács II (yellow card) 49'; Völgyi (yellow card) 59'; Bajzát 81', (yellow card) 81'	Report	Boka (yellow card) 15'; Lanig 31'; Hitzlsperger 41'; Gómez 55', 60'	Stadium: ETO Park; Attendance: 9,000; Referee: Espen Berntsen (Norway); Assistant referees: Erik Ræstad (Norway), Odd-Jarle Larsen (Norway); Fourth official: Svein-Erik Edvartsen (Norway)
Note: VfB Stuttgart won 6–2 on aggregate.
