= 2007–08 Győri ETO FC season =

Győr
2007–08 season
- Manager: Sándor Egervári
- Stadium: ETO Park
- Nemzeti Bajnokság I: 3rd
- Magyar Kupa: Round of 16
- Ligakupa: Autumn season: Quarter-finals; Spring season: Runners-up
- Highest home attendance: 6,000 (multiple Nemzeti Bajnokság I matches)
- Lowest home attendance: 100 (multiple Ligakupa matches)
- Average home league attendance: 3,827
- Biggest win: 7–0 v Jánosháza (Away, 5 September 2007, Magyar Kupa)
- Biggest defeat: 0–6 v Debrecen (Away, 7 May 2008, Ligakupa)

The 2007–08 season was Győri Egyetértés Torna Osztály Futball Club's 62nd competitive season, 49th consecutive season in the Nemzeti Bajnokság I and 102nd season in existence as a football club. In addition to the domestic league, Győr participated in that season's editions of the Magyar Kupa and the Ligakupa.

== Squad ==
Squad at end of season

Note: Flags indicate national team as defined under FIFA eligibility rules; some limited exceptions apply. Players may hold more than one non-FIFA nationality.

No.	Pos.	Nation	Player
1	GK	SRB	Saša Stevanović
3	DF	HUN	Zoltán Kovács
5	MF	HUN	István Bank
6	DF	HUN	Róbert Varga
7	MF	HUN	Antal Jäkl
8	MF	HUN	György Józsi
9	MF	HUN	Zoltán Böőr
11	FW	MNE	Bojan Brnović
12	MF	HUN	László Varga
13	MF	HUN	Dávid Pákolicz
14	MF	HUN	Dániel Völgyi
16	MF	HUN	Máté Kiss
17	MF	MLI	Ben Traoré

No.	Pos.	Nation	Player
19	FW	HUN	Péter Bajzát
21	MF	HUN	Ádám Dudás
23	FW	HUN	Tibor Tokody
25	DF	HUN	Balázs Nikolov
26	DF	SRB	Zoran Šupić
28	MF	CMR	Eugene Fomumbod
29	MF	HUN	Tamás Koltai
30	FW	HUN	Imre Csermelyi
31	GK	HUN	Péter Molnár
32	DF	HUN	Péter Stark
33	MF	GAB	Arsène Copa
55	GK	HUN	Zoltán Varga

== Competitions ==
=== Overview ===
Competition	First match	Last match	Starting round	Final position	Record							
Competition	First match	Last match	Starting round	Final position	Pld	W	D	L	GF	GA	GD	Win %
Nemzeti Bajnokság I	27 July 2007	31 May 2008	Matchday 1	3rd	30	16	10	4	64	35	+29	53.33
Magyar Kupa	5 September 2007	7 November 2007	Third round	Round of 16	4	2	1	1	13	4	+9	50.00
Ligakupa (Autumn season)	14 August 2007	27 October 2007	Group stage	Quarter-finals	8	4	2	2	16	11	+5	50.00
Ligakupa (Spring season)	1 December 2007	7 May 2008	Group stage	Runners-up	12	7	4	1	24	15	+9	58.33
Total					54	29	17	8	117	65	+52	53.70

Source: Competitions

=== Nemzeti Bajnokság I ===
==== League table ====
Pos	Team	Pld	W	D	L	GF	GA	GD	Pts	Qualification or relegation
1	MTK (C)	30	20	6	4	67	23	+44	66	Qualification for Champions League second qualifying round
2	Debrecen	30	19	7	4	67	29	+38	64	Qualification for UEFA Cup first qualifying round
3	Győr	30	16	10	4	64	35	+29	58	Qualification for UEFA Cup first qualifying round
4	Újpest	30	16	7	7	58	40	+18	55	
5	Fehérvár	30	17	3	10	48	32	+16	54	

Source: soccerway.com
(C) Champions

==== Results summary ====
Overall								Home						Away					
Pld	W	D	L	GF	GA	GD	Pts	W	D	L	GF	GA	GD	W	D	L	GF	GA	GD
30	16	10	4	64	35	+29	58	11	4	0	42	18	+24	5	6	4	22	17	+5

Source: Hungarian Football Federation

==== Matches ====
27 July 2007 2	Debrecen	2–0	Győr	Debrecen
19:00 CEST (UTC+2)	Dzsudzsák 45'; Demjén 57', (yellow card) 57'	Report		Stadium: Oláh Gábor utcai Stadion; Attendance: 6,600; Referee: Zsolt Szabó; Assistant referees: Róbert Kispál, Zoltán Pápai; Fourth official: Róbert Nagy

4 August 2007 3	Győr	2–1	Tatabánya	Győr
18:00 CEST (UTC+2)	Bogdanović 6', (yellow card) 77'; V. Farkas 15' (o.g.); Z. Kovács II (yellow card) 56'; Nikolov (yellow card) 63'; Bank (yellow card) 76'	Report	Ughy (yellow card) 58'; Filó 74'	Stadium: ETO Park; Attendance: 3,600; Referee: Gergely Sulyok; Assistant referees: György Ring, Vencel Tóth II; Fourth official: Péter Herbály

11 August 2007 4	Siófok	0–1	Győr	Siófok
19:00 CEST (UTC+2)	Fülöp (yellow card) 79'	Report	Stark 56'; Nikolov (yellow card) 69'	Stadium: Révész Géza utcai Stadion; Attendance: 3,000; Referee: Sándor Andó-Szabó; Assistant referees: Oszkár Lémon, Zoltán Kis; Fourth official: Gábor Oláh

18 August 2007 5	Győr	2–1	Rákospalota	Győr
17:30 CEST (UTC+2)	Bank (yellow card) 42'; Bajzát 62'; Bogdanović 83'; Völgyi (yellow card) 87'	Report	Kapcsos 76'	Stadium: ETO Park; Attendance: 3,000; Referee: Tamás Bognár; Assistant referees: Balázs Huszár, István Szécsényi; Fourth official: Krisztián Király

25 August 2007 6	Zalaegerszeg	0–0	Győr	Zalaegerszeg
19:00 CEST (UTC+2)		Report	Šupić (yellow card) 17'; Bajzát (yellow card) 28'; Müller (yellow card) 55'	Stadium: ZTE Arena; Attendance: 8,000; Referee: Szabolcs Szilasi; Assistant referees: Gábor Takács, Zsolt Márton; Fourth official: Gergely Szőts

29 August 2007 1	Nyíregyháza	1–0	Győr	Nyíregyháza
17:00 CEST (UTC+2)	Hegedűs 44'; Cséke (yellow card) 53'	Report	Šupić (yellow card) 48'; Müller (yellow card) 70'; Völgyi (yellow card) 90+1'	Stadium: Városi Stadion; Attendance: 3,000; Referee: Sándor Andó-Szabó; Assistant referees: István Tóth, Zsolt Butkai; Fourth official: István Kelemen

1 September 2007 7	Győr	1–1	Sopron	Győr
16:30 CEST (UTC+2)	Fehér 28' (o.g.); Brnović (yellow card) 83'	Report	Hullám 9', (yellow card) 75'; Gyömbér (yellow card) 32'; A. Farkas (yellow card) 42'; Tchana (yellow card) 73'; Fehér (yellow card) 84'; Birtalan (yellow card) 88'	Stadium: ETO Park; Attendance: 3,200; Referee: József Berger; Assistant referees: Zoltán Szalai, Attila Forgács; Fourth official: J. Zoltán Kovács

17 September 2007 8	MTK	2–2	Győr	Budapest
18:00 CEST (UTC+2)	Lambulić 17'; Rodenbücher (yellow card) 49'; Á. Szabó 50'; Urbán (yellow card) 60'	Report	Nikolov 44'; Brnović 82'	Stadium: Hidegkuti Nándor Stadion; Attendance: 1,000; Referee: Tamás Bognár; Assistant referees: Dr. Péter Szabó, Balázs Huszár; Fourth official: Tibor Gyarmati II

22 September 2007 9	Győr	4–1	Fehérvár	Győr
16:00 CEST (UTC+2)	Völgyi (yellow card) 22'; Brnović 31'; Nikolov (yellow card) 52'; Bajzát 57'; Bogdanović 73'; Bank 86'	Report	Kocsis (yellow card) 18'; Sitku 23', (yellow card) 58'; Koller (red card) 87'	Stadium: ETO Park; Attendance: 6,000; Referee: Gergely Sulyok; Assistant referees: György Ring, Vencel Tóth II; Fourth official: Tibor Farkas

29 September 2007 10	Kaposvár	1–1	Győr	Kaposvár
18:00 CEST (UTC+2)	Oláh 37'; Milinte (yellow card) 43'	Report	Jäkl 3'; Müller (yellow card) 37'; Brnović (yellow card) 76'	Stadium: Rákóczi Stadion; Attendance: 3,000; Referee: Szabolcs Szilasi; Assistant referees: Gábor Takács, István Iványi; Fourth official: Csaba Ursprung

6 October 2007 11	Győr	3–3	Paks	Győr
15:00 CEST (UTC+2)	Nikolov 9'; Völgyi 62'; Bogdanović 67'; Stevanović (yellow card) 90'	Report	Tököli 52'; Balaskó (yellow card) 81', (goal) 88' (pen.); Márkus 90+2'	Stadium: ETO Park; Attendance: 4,000; Referee: Tamás Arany; Assistant referees: Zoltán Szalai, Ferenc Varga; Fourth official: Dániel Becséri

20 October 2007 12	Honvéd	2–2	Győr	Budapest
15:00 CEST (UTC+2)	Hercegfalvi 58'; Smiljanić (yellow card) 61'; Magasföldi (yellow card) 78'; Z. Vincze 89'	Report	Bajzát (yellow card) 25', (goal) 38', 54'; Šupić (yellow card) 88'	Stadium: Bozsik József Stadion; Attendance: 3,000; Referee: József Berger; Assistant referees: Attila Forgács, József Heibl; Fourth official: Gábor Oláh

3 November 2007 13	Győr	4–2	Újpest	Győr
13:00 CET (UTC+1)	Völgyi 8', (yellow card) 36'; Nikolov (red card) 43'; Bajzát 49', 67'; Z. Kovács II (yellow card) 63'; Tokody 90'	Report	Sadjo (yellow card) 33'; G. Sándor 37'; Radulovic (yellow card) 47'; Z. Kovács I 53'	Stadium: ETO Park; Attendance: 3,500; Referee: Tamás Arany; Assistant referees: László Viszokai, István Szécsényi; Fourth official: Dániel Becséri

10 November 2007 14	Vasas	1–1	Győr	Budapest
16:00 CET (UTC+1)	N. Németh 84' (pen.)	Report	Koltai 79'	Stadium: Illovszky Rudolf Stadion; Attendance: 700; Referee: Viktor Kassai; Assistant referees: Zsolt Szpisják, Tibor Vámos; Fourth official: István Kelemen

24 November 2007 15	Győr	5–1	Diósgyőr	Győr
13:00 CET (UTC+1)	Józsi 2'; Bajzát 35', 70'; Z. Kovács II (yellow card) 36', (goal) 90+1'; Bogdanović (yellow card) 40', (goal) 54'; Völgyi (yellow card) 44'	Report	Ebala 10'; Bessong (yellow card) 41'; N. Farkas (yellow card) 84'	Stadium: ETO Park; Attendance: 1,800; Referee: Csaba Imre Sápi; Assistant referees: Zoltán Tompos, Lajos L. Tóth; Fourth official: Péter Berettyán

23 February 2008 16	Győr	5–0	Nyíregyháza	Győr
14:00 CET (UTC+1)	Tokody 7', 77', (yellow card) 90+1'; Völgyi 21'; Dudás 54'; Brnović 79'	Report	Mboussi (yellow card) 9'; Ramos (yellow card) 17'; Cornaci (yellow card) 37'	Stadium: ETO Park; Attendance: 3,000; Referee: Ferenc Bede; Assistant referees: Zsolt Márton, Zsolt Butkai; Fourth official: Gábor Oláh

1 March 2008 17	Győr	3–1	Debrecen	Győr
15:00 CET (UTC+1)	Stark 37'; Tokody (yellow card) 40'; Völgyi 52'; Böőr 83'	Report	Czvitkovics 88'	Stadium: ETO Park; Attendance: 3,000; Referee: István Mészáros; Assistant referees: Gábor Erős, László Viszokai; Fourth official: J. Zoltán Kovács

8 March 2008 18	Tatabánya	1–3	Győr	Budapest (Note: The match was played at the Szőnyi úti Stadion in Budapest, instead of Tatabánya regular stadium, the Városi Stadion in Tatabánya, which did not meet HFF requirements.)
16:00 CET (UTC+1)	Béres 73'	Report	Brnović 21'; Böőr 56', 61'	Stadium: Szőnyi úti Stadion; Attendance: 300; Referee: Krisztián Király; Assistant referees: Balázs Huszár, Zoltán Kovács; Fourth official: Tamás Bognár
Note: Tatabánya admitted up to 600 spectators to the match at their own risk.

15 March 2008 19	Győr	4–1	Siófok	Győr
14:30 CET (UTC+1)	Völgyi 26', (yellow card) 32'; Dudás 52'; Nikolov (yellow card) 57'; Koltai 65'; Brnović 90+2'	Report	Csopaki 53'	Stadium: ETO Park; Attendance: 3,800; Referee: Csaba Imre Sápi; Assistant referees: Dr. Zsolt Varga, Tamás Márkus; Fourth official: János Guta

24 March 2008 20	Rákospalota	2–2	Győr	Sopron (Note: The match was played at the Káposztás utcai Stadion in Sopron, instead of Rákospalota regular stadium, the Budai II. László Stadion in Budapest, which did not meet HFF requirements.)
18:00 CET (UTC+1)	Kapcsos (yellow card) 7'; Somorjai 26'; Torma 72'	Report	Jäkl (yellow card) 24'; Brnović 46'; Böőr 50'; Nikolov (yellow card) 86'	Stadium: Káposztás utcai Stadion; Attendance: 1,200; Referee: Ferenc Bede; Assistant referees: Gábor Erős, Zoltán Szalai; Fourth official: József Erdős

29 March 2008 21	Győr	3–2	Zalaegerszeg	Győr
15:00 CET (UTC+1)	Pákolicz 27'; Brnović 32', 90+3'; Völgyi (yellow card) 88'	Report	Polgár (yellow card) 47'; Waltner 68', 71'; Botiș (yellow card) 77'; Méyé (yellow card) 83'	Stadium: ETO Park; Attendance: 4,000; Referee: Tamás Arany; Assistant referees: László Viszokai, Balázs Farkas; Fourth official: Gábor Péter Kovács

5 April 2008 22	Sopron	0–3 (awd.)	Győr	Sopron
		Report		Stadium: Káposztás utcai Stadion
Note: After the exclusion of Sopron, the matches were registered with a goal difference of 3–0.

12 April 2008 23	Győr	1–0	MTK	Győr
15:00 CEST (UTC+2)	Nikolov 51'	Report	Vadnai (yellow card) 35'; Zsidai (yellow card) 71'; L. Horváth (yellow card) 72'; J. Kanta (yellow card) 73'	Stadium: ETO Park; Attendance: 6,000; Referee: Péter Solymosi; Assistant referees: Zoltán Kovács, Zsolt Márton; Fourth official: Tibor Gyarmati II

19 April 2008 24	Fehérvár	1–0	Győr	Székesfehérvár
19:00 CEST (UTC+2)	Dajić 9'; Simek (yellow card) 58'; Z. Sebők (yellow card) 89'	Report	Stark (yellow card) 11'; Böőr (yellow card) 56'; Völgyi (yellow card) 65'; Józsi (yellow card) 86'; Nikolov (yellow card) 90+2'	Stadium: Sóstói Stadion; Attendance: 3,790; Referee: Viktor Kassai; Assistant referees: Tibor Vámos, Vencel Tóth II; Fourth official: Tibor Farkas

26 April 2008 25	Győr	1–1	Kaposvár	Győr
15:00 CEST (UTC+2)	Brnović 48'; Nikolov (yellow card) 50'; Stark (yellow card) 85'	Report	Grúz (yellow card) 45'; Maróti (yellow card) 53'; Oláh 78'; Zahorecz (yellow card) 90'	Stadium: ETO Park; Attendance: 4,000; Referee: Mihály Fábián; Assistant referees: Dr. Zsolt Varga, Gyula Ortó; Fourth official: Róbert Nagy

3 May 2008 26	Paks	2–1	Győr	Paks
19:00 CEST (UTC+2)	Tököli 8', 17'; Böde (yellow card) 21'; Báló (yellow card) 82'	Report	Völgyi (yellow card) 26'; Šupić (yellow card) 60'; Tokody 85'	Stadium: Fehérvári úti Stadion; Attendance: 2,000; Referee: Ferenc Bede; Assistant referees: Tibor Vámos, István Iványi; Fourth official: Gergely Szőts

10 May 2008 27	Győr	2–2	Honvéd	Győr
15:00 CEST (UTC+2)	Fomumbod (yellow card) 10'; Stark (yellow card) 62'; Bajzát 64'; L. Varga 73'; Völgyi (red card) 74'	Report	Dobos (yellow card) 17', (goal) 62'; Diego 25', (yellow card) 79'; Gebro (yellow card) 89'	Stadium: ETO Park; Attendance: 2,500; Referee: Zoltán Iványi; Assistant referees: János Medovarszki, Zsolt Butkai; Fourth official: Tibor Gyarmati II

16 May 2008 28	Újpest	1–3	Győr	Budapest
19:00 CEST (UTC+2)	Tisza 25'	Report	Bajzát 36', 67'; Juhár 52' (o.g.)	Stadium: Szusza Ferenc Stadion; Attendance: 4,118; Referee: Tamás Arany; Assistant referees: Gábor Takács, Zoltán Szalai; Fourth official: Gábor Péter Kovács

25 May 2008 29	Győr	2–1	Vasas	Győr
18:00 CEST (UTC+2)	Jäkl (yellow card) 56'; Bajzát 65'; Józsi 89'	Report	N. Németh 58'; Piller (yellow card) 61'	Stadium: ETO Park; Attendance: 6,000; Referee: József Berger; Assistant referees: Attila Forgács, Gábor Kormányos II; Fourth official: Ferenc Szöllősi

31 May 2008 30	Diósgyőr	1–3	Győr	Miskolc
15:00 CEST (UTC+2)	Vitelki (yellow card) 70'; Kamber 86'	Report	Šupić (yellow card) 20'; Böőr 43'; Brnović 55'; Bajzát 76'; M. Kiss (yellow card) 90+2'	Stadium: Diósgyőri Stadion; Attendance: 5,000; Referee: Ferenc Bede; Assistant referees: Róbert Kispál, Balázs Farkas; Fourth official: Gábor Oláh

=== Magyar Kupa ===
5 September 2007 Third round	Jánosháza	0–7	Győr	Jánosháza
16:00 CEST (UTC+2)		Report	Brnović 6', 42'; Bajzát 44', 57', 70'; Tokody 50'; Vető 65'	Stadium: Jánosházai Sportpálya; Attendance: 300; Referee: J. Zoltán Kovács; Assistant referees: L. Makk, L. Szűcs

26 September 2007 Round of 32	Andráshida	0–3	Győr	Zalaegerszeg
15:00 CEST (UTC+2)	Kottán (yellow card) 25'	Report	Bajzát 58', (red card) 67'; Török 65' (o.g.); Völgyi 90'	Stadium: Andráshidai Sportpálya; Attendance: 100; Referee: Csaba Pintér; Assistant referees: Király, Rácz

==== Round of 16 ====
24 October 2007 First leg	Győr	1–1	Fehérvár	Győr
14:30 CEST (UTC+2)	Stark (red card) 34'; Brnović 45'	Report	Sitku 43'	Stadium: ETO Park; Attendance: 500; Referee: Sándor Andó-Szabó; Assistant referees: György Ring, Balázs Farkas

7 November 2007 Second leg	Fehérvár	3–2 (4–3 agg.)	Győr	Székesfehérvár
18:00 CET (UTC+1)	Sitku 14', (yellow card) 85'; Dvéri 31', (yellow card) 85'; Koller 42'; Dajić (yellow card) 50'	Report	Z. Kovács II (yellow card) 45'; Nikolov (yellow card) 77'; L. Varga 84'; Granát 87'	Stadium: Sóstói Stadion; Attendance: 250; Referee: Tamás Bognár; Assistant referees: Zoltán Kovács, Oszkár Lémon
Note: Fehérvár won 4–3 on aggregate.

=== Ligakupa ===
==== Autumn season ====
===== Group stage =====
Pos	Team	Pld	W	D	L	GF	GA	GD	Pts	Qualification	GYO	TAT	MTK	SOP
1	Győr	6	4	0	2	13	8	+5	12	Advance to knockout phase	—	3–0	1–0	1–2
2	Tatabánya	6	3	1	2	13	9	+4	10	Advance to knockout phase	3–1	—	0–0	8–1
3	MTK Budapest	6	2	1	3	8	9	−1	7		2–3	4–1	—	2–1
4	Sopron	6	2	0	4	8	16	−8	6		1–4	0–1	3–0	—

Source: HFF

14 August 2007 1	Győr	1–2	Sopron	Győr
18:00 CEST (UTC+2)	Granát 36'; Jäkl (yellow card) 45'	Report	Reinhardt (yellow card) 30'; Birtalan 50'; Hullám (yellow card) 57'; Dancs (yellow card) 77', (goal) 84'	Stadium: ETO Park; Attendance: 1,500; Referee: Zoltán Iványi

22 August 2007 2	MTK	2–3	Győr	Budapest
16:00 CEST (UTC+2)	Á. Szabó 54', 79', (yellow card) 73'	Report	Z. Kovács II (yellow card) 37'; L. Varga 43', 64'; Granát 45'	Stadium: Hidegkuti Nándor Stadion; Attendance: 400; Referee: Mihály Fábián; Assistant referees: Zoltán Pápai, Tamás Márkus

9 September 2007 3	Tatabánya	3–1	Győr	Tatabánya
16:30 CEST (UTC+2)	Weisz 61'; Filó 67'; Hajdú 81'	Report	Tokody 73'	Stadium: Városi Stadion; Attendance: 400; Referee: Péter Solymosi; Assistant referees: Zsolt Márton, Oszkár Lémon

19 September 2007 4	Győr	3–0	Tatabánya	Győr
16:00 CEST (UTC+2)	R. Varga 53'; Nyári (yellow card) 54'; Domanyik (yellow card) 67'; Müller (yellow card) 71'; Granát 72', 86'	Report		Stadium: ETO Park; Attendance: 100; Referee: Gábor Oláh; Assistant referees: Zsolt Butkai, Balázs Farkas

3 October 2007 5	Sopron	1–4	Győr	Sopron
18:00 CEST (UTC+2)	Pintér (yellow card) 44'; Dancs 72'	Report	L. Varga 15'; Domanyik (yellow card) 18'; Z. Kovács II 48'; Granát 78' (pen.), 90'	Stadium: Káposztás utcai Stadion; Attendance: 500; Referee: Sándor Andó-Szabó; Assistant referees: Tibor Vámos, Zsolt Márton

10 October 2007 6	Győr	1–0	MTK	Győr
15:00 CEST (UTC+2)	Nikolov (yellow card) 9'; Stark (yellow card) 18'; Brnović 48'; Jäkl (yellow card) 53'; Šupić (yellow card) 54'	Report	Lambulić (yellow card) 54'; Kecskés (yellow card) 90'	Stadium: ETO Park; Attendance: 300; Referee: Viktor Kassai; Assistant referees: Gábor Erős, István Szécsényi

===== Knockout phase =====
====== Quarter-finals ======
17 October 2007 First leg	Fehérvár	1–1	Győr	Székesfehérvár
17:00 CEST (UTC+2)	Dvéri (yellow card) 51'; Božić (yellow card) 54'; Sitku 63'	Report	Tokody 81'	Stadium: Sóstói Stadion; Attendance: 200; Referee: Zoltán Iványi; Assistant referees: János Medovarszki, Dr. Ádám Vári

27 October 2007 Secong leg	Győr	2–2 (3–3 (a) agg.)	Fehérvár	Győr
13:30 CEST (UTC+2)	Nikolov (red card) 35'; Bogdanović 36'; Z. Kovács II (yellow card) 81'; Brnović 85'	Report	Disztl 6'; Á. Horváth 32', (yellow card) 33'; Pálfi (yellow card) 38'; Dajić (yellow card) 90'	Stadium: ETO Park; Attendance: 400; Referee: Roland Veizer (Hungary); Assistant referees: Gábor Erős (Hungary), Dharman (Qatar)
Note: 3–3 on aggregate. Fehérvár won on away goals.

==== Spring season ====
===== Group stage =====
Pos	Team	Pld	W	D	L	GF	GA	GD	Pts	Qualification	ZAL	GYO	TAT	SOP
1	Zalaegerszeg	6	4	2	0	19	3	+16	14	Advance to knockout phase	—	1–1	7–0	5–0
2	Győr	6	4	2	0	16	6	+10	14	Advance to knockout phase	1–1	—	3–2	4–1
3	Tatabánya	6	1	0	5	7	19	−12	3		1–2	1–4	—	3–0 (Note: Sopron couldn't finish the 2007–08 season due to bankruptcy. All remaining matches were counted as won for their opponents.)
4	Sopron	6	1	0	5	4	18	−14	3	Exclution	0–3	0–3	3–0	—

Source: HFF
Notes:

1 December 2007 1	Győr	1–1	Zalaegerszeg	Győr
13:00 CET (UTC+1)	Dudás 13'; Granát (yellow card) 83'	Report	Méyé 38'	Stadium: ETO Park; Attendance: 100; Referee: István Mészáros; Assistant referees: László Viszokai, Dr. Péter Szabó

5 December 2007 2	Tatabánya	1–4	Győr	Tatabánya
13:00 CET (UTC+1)	M. Takács 26'	Report	Csermelyi 9'; Koltai 33', 88'; Dudás (yellow card) 44'; Brnović 56'	Stadium: Városi Stadion; Attendance: 300; Referee: János Takács; Assistant referees: Tamás Márkus, Zoltán Pápai

8 December 2007 3	Győr	4–1	Sopron	Győr
13:00 CET (UTC+1)	Koltai 6'; Bajzát 20'; Bogdanović 32', 77'	Report	Legoza 66'	Stadium: ETO Park; Attendance: 300; Referee: Szabolcs Szilasi; Assistant referees: Gábor Takács, István Szécsényi

19 February 2008 4	Sopron	0–3 (awd.)	Győr	Sopron
		Report		Stadium: Káposztás utcai Stadion

20 February 2008 5	Zalaegerszeg	1–1	Győr	Zalaegerszeg
14:00 CET (UTC+1)	Sámson (yellow card) 8'; Fülöp 60'	Report	Z. Kovács II 30'	Stadium: ZTE Arena; Attendance: 400; Referee: Krisztián Pánczél; Assistant referees: Gábor Takács, Oszkár Lémon

27 February 2008 6	Győr	3–2	Tatabánya	Győr
14:00 CET (UTC+1)	Csermelyi 29'; Lappints 56', 87'; Fomumbod (yellow card) 68'	Report	Almási (yellow card) 59'; Megyesi 73', 76'; I. Kovács (yellow card) 77'	Stadium: ETO Park; Attendance: 200; Referee: Gergely Sulyok; Assistant referees: Róbert Kispál, György Ring

===== Knockout phase =====
====== Quarter-finals ======
5 March 2008 First leg	Győr	1–1	Paks	Győr
14:30 CET (UTC+1)	Pákolicz 39'	Report	Böde (yellow card) 57'; Tamási (yellow card) 64', (goal) 88'	Stadium: ETO Park; Attendance: 200; Referee: Tamás Bognár; Assistant referees: Dr. Péter Szabó, Gábor Takács

12 March 2008 Second leg	Paks	1–2 (2–3 agg.)	Győr	Paks
13:30 CET (UTC+1)	Balaskó 88'	Report	Lappints 72'; Sánta 81'	Stadium: Fehérvári úti Stadion; Attendance: 400; Referee: Péter Solymosi; Assistant referees: Oszkár Lémon, László Viszokai
Note: Győr won 3–2 on aggregate.

====== Semi-finals ======
15 April 2008 First leg	MTK	1–1	Győr	Budapest
15:00 CEST (UTC+2)	Rodenbücher 53'	Report	Z. Kovács II (yellow card) 39', (goal) 64'	Stadium: Hidegkuti Nándor Stadion; Attendance: 200; Referee: Zsolt Szabó; Assistant referees: Róbert Kispál, Zsolt Butkai

23 April 2008 Second leg	Győr	2–0 (3–1 agg.)	MTK	Győr
16:30 CEST (UTC+2)	L. Varga 11'; Dudás 70'	Report		Stadium: ETO Park; Attendance: 1,300; Referee: Tamás Arany; Assistant referees: László Viszokai, Attila Beidek
Note: Győr won 3–1 on aggregate.

====== Final ======
30 April 2008 First leg	Győr	2–0	Debrecen	Győr
18:00 CEST (UTC+2)	Tokody 40'; Dudás 43' (pen.); R. Varga (yellow card) 80'; Z. Kovács II (yellow card) 90+1'	Report	Z. Takács (yellow card) 66'; Éles (yellow card) 69'; Chigou (yellow card) 81'	Stadium: ETO Park; Attendance: 1,500; Referee: István Vad; Assistant referees: Vencel Tóth II, Balázs Farkas

7 May 2008 Second leg	Debrecen	6–0 (6–2 agg.)	Győr	Debrecen
18:00 CEST (UTC+2)	Kouemaha 9', 44'; Huszák 33'; Szűcs (yellow card) 56'; Bogdanović 78', 84'; Pákolicz 79' (o.g.)	Report	Traoré (yellow card) 19'; Šupić (yellow card) 32'; Jäkl (yellow card) 64'	Stadium: Oláh Gábor utcai Stadion; Attendance: 4,000; Referee: Viktor Kassai; Assistant referees: Róbert Kispál, Attila Kelemen; Fourth official: Ádám Farkas
Note: Debrecen won 6–2 on aggregate and advanced to the Grand final.
