= Fomumbod =

Fomumbod is a surname. Notable people with the surname include:

- Anne Stella Fomumbod, Cameroonian women's rights activist
- Eugene Fomumbod (born 1985), Cameroonian footballer
