= Dorogi =

Dorogi may refer to:

- "Roads" (Red Army Choir song), 1945
- Dorogi FC, a football club from Dorog, Hungary
- Attila Dorogi (born 1987), Hungarian football player
