= Anne Stella Fomumbod =

Camaronnian Women's rights activist

- Born: 1962 (age 63–64); Cameroon
- Occupation: Women's rights activist
- Employer: Interfaith Vision Foundation of Cameroon (IVFCam)
- Known for: Founder and CEO of the Interfaith Vision Foundation of Cameroon; promoting the Metta Charter on Widowhood
- Awards: National Award for the Advancement of Women (2004); Women's World Summit Foundation Prize for Women's Creativity in Rural Life (2010); BBC 100 Women (2013)

Anne Stella Fomumbod is a Cameroonian women's rights activist and civil society leader. She is the founder and chief executive officer (CEO) of Interfaith Vision Foundation Cameroon (IVFCam), a non-governmental organisation based in Cameroon's Northwest region that works with community-based organisations to promote human rights and democracy at the grassroots level. She is best known internationally for creating the Metta Charter on Widowhood and for her fellowship at the National Endowment for Democracy.

== Career ==
In 1999, Fomumbod founded the Interfaith Vision Foundation of Cameroon. The organisation was originally called "Aid International Christian Women of Vision" (AI-ChrisWOV), but the name was changed in January 2008, following a consultation and assessment sponsored by Voluntary Service Overseas, which highlighted the clear need to embrace all faiths.

IVFCam focuses its efforts on helping the disadvantaged, particularly women and children, especially young widows, orphans and those with HIV and AIDS. IVFCam is a not-for-profit, non-governmental charity, and has worked with the Economic and Social Council of the United Nations since 2013.

Fomumbod has worked with 53 village councils to promote women’s rights and the inclusion of more women on local councils. She is perhaps best known for creating and obtaining government support for the Metta Charter on Widowhood, a first in Cameroon, allowing significant progress in the human right of widows.

Fomumbod received the Cameroonian government's Award of Excellence from Governor Lafrique in 2004.

== Honours and awards ==
In 2004, Fomumbod received a National Award for the Advancement of Women in Cameroon. In 2010, she received the Women's World Summit Foundation's Prize for Women's Creativity in Rural Life.

In 2013, Fomumbod was included in the BBC's 100 Women.
