= Mário Bicák =

Slovak footballer

Personal information
- Full name: Mário Bicák
- Date of birth: 21 October 1979 (age 47)
- Place of birth: Prešov, Czechoslovakia
- Height: 1.75 m (5 ft 9 in)
- Position: Winger

Youth career
- Prešov

Senior career*
| Years | Team | Apps | (Gls) |
- FC Pivovar Veľký Šariš
| 2000–2005 | Steel Trans Ličartovce | | |
| 2005–2008 | Košice | 85 | (7) |
| 2008–2010 | ETO Győr | 25 | (2) |
| 2010–2013 | Spartak Trnava | 58 | (6) |
| 2013–2014 | ÖTSU Biberbach | 0 | (0) |

International career
| 2006 | Slovakia | 3 | (0) |
- * Club domestic league appearances and goals as of 7 December 2012

Mário Bicák (born 21 October 1979) is a Slovak football midfielder.

He came to Spartak Trnava in summer 2010.
