= Ben Traoré =

Malian footballer

Personal information
- Full name: Ben Abdoulaye Traoré
- Date of birth: 18 April 1986 (age 40)
- Place of birth: Bamako, Mali
- Height: 1.82 m (6 ft 0 in)
- Position: Midfielder

Youth career
- –2004: AS Maya

Senior career*
Years	Team	Apps	(Gls)
2005–2008	US Forces Armées	–	(–)
2008–2009	Győri ETO	12	(0)
2009	Olympic Azzaweya	10	(0)
2010	FC Haka	15	(0)
2012	AC Kajaani	23	(1)
- * Club domestic league appearances and goals as of 2 July 2013

Ben Traoré (born 18 April 1986) is a Malian footballer. He last played for AC Kajaani in the Finnish third tier Kakkonen.

Traoré has previously played in the top divisions of Burkina Faso, Hungary, Libya and Finland. He has capped 8 times for the Mali national team.
