= Dávid Pákolicz =

Hungarian footballer

Personal information
- Date of birth: 13 September 1984 (age 42)
- Place of birth: Kalocsa, Hungary
- Height: 1.86 m (6 ft 1 in)
- Position: Midfielder

Team information
- Current team: Nyíregyháza
- Number: 19

Youth career
- 1992–2002: Kalocsa

Senior career*
Years	Team	Apps	(Gls)
2002–2005	Kalocsa	?	(?)
2005–2010	Győr	41	(2)
2005–2006	→ Integrál-DAC (loan)	6	(4)
2008–2009	→ Győr II	11	(3)
2009–2010	→ Nyíregyháza (loan)	21	(2)
2010–2011	Nyíregyháza	29	(10)
2011–	Pécs	1	(0)
2012	→ Nyíregyháza (loan)	12	(5)
2012–	Nyíregyháza	68	(9)
- * Club domestic league appearances and goals as of 30 November 2014

Dávid Pákolicz (born 13 September 1984 in Kalocsa) is a Hungarian football player who currently plays for Nyíregyháza Spartacus.
