= Saša Stevanović =

Serbian footballer

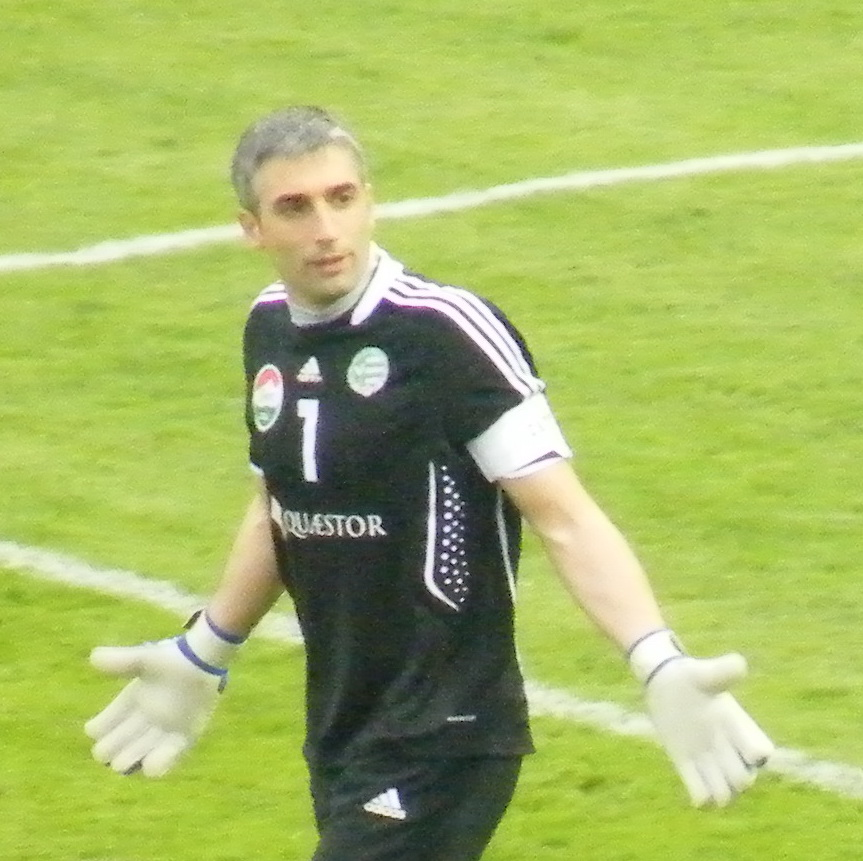
- Stevanović with Győr in 2010

Personal information
- Full name: Saša Stevanović
- Date of birth: 4 August 1974 (age 52)
- Place of birth: Kragujevac, SFR Yugoslavia
- Height: 1.95 m (6 ft 5 in)
- Position: Goalkeeper

Senior career*
Years	Team	Apps	(Gls)
1994–1997	Radnički Kragujevac	43	(0)
1998–2000	Sartid Smederevo	29	(0)
2000–2004	OFK Beograd	115	(0)
2004–2014	Győr	258	(0)
Total		445	(0)

International career
2001	FR Yugoslavia	3	(0)
2001	FR Yugoslavia XI	1	(0)
- * Club domestic league appearances and goals

Saša Stevanović (Serbian Cyrillic: Саша Стевановић; born 4 August 1974) is a Serbian former professional footballer who played as a goalkeeper.

== Club career ==
After starting out at his hometown club Radnički Kragujevac, Stevanović also played for Sartid Smederevo (1998–2000) and OFK Beograd (2000–2004) in his homeland, before moving to Hungarian side Győr in the summer of 2004. He spent the next 10 years at the club, amassing a total of 258 league appearances. In the 2012–13 season, Stevanović helped Győr win their first national championship title after 30 years.

== International career ==
In 2001, Stevanović was capped three times for FR Yugoslavia. He was also a member of the team that won the Millennium Super Soccer Cup earlier that year, making one appearance in the process. However, these caps are not officially recognized by FIFA.

== Honours ==
Győr

- Nemzeti Bajnokság I: 2012–13
- Szuperkupa: 2013
- Magyar Kupa: Runner-up 2008–09, 2012–13
