= Péter Bajzát =

Hungarian footballer (born 1981)

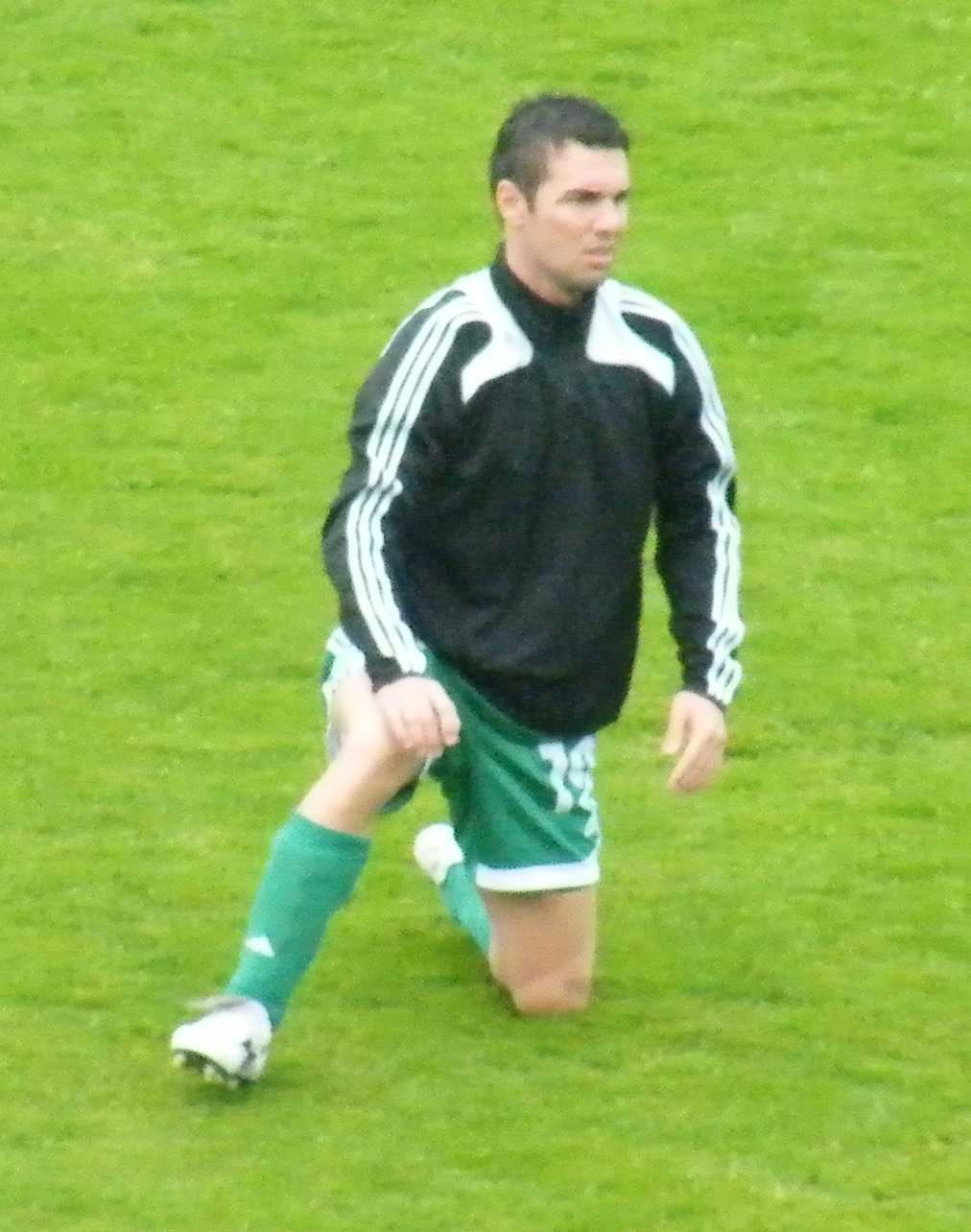
- Bajzát in 2009

Personal information
- Date of birth: 22 June 1981 (age 45)
- Place of birth: Eger, Hungary
- Height: 1.83 m (6 ft 0 in)
- Position: Forward

Youth career
- 1995–1998: Eger

Senior career*
Years	Team	Apps	(Gls)
1998–2004	Debrecen	129	(73)
2004–2005	Rot-Weiß Oberhausen	7	(3)
2005–2010	Győr	92	(57)
2009–2010	→ Diósgyőr (loan)	10	(2)
2010–2011	Nyíregyháza	26	(25)
2011–2013	Pécs	38	(15)
2013–2015	Nyíregyháza	51	(42)
2015	→ Mezőkövesd Zsóry (loan)	7	(3)
2015–2016	Mezőkövesd Zsóry	10	(2)
2016–2017	Soroksár	32	(10)
2017–2018	Nyíregyháza	13	(1)
Total		415	(233)
- * Club domestic league appearances and goals

Péter Bajzát (born 22 June 1981) is a Hungarian former professional footballer who played as a forward.

== Honours ==
Debreceni VSC

- Hungarian Cup: 1999, 2001

Győr

- Nemzeti Bajnokság I: 2007, 2010
- Hungarian Cup: runner up 2009

Individual

- Player of the Year in Hungary: 2008
- Hungarian National Championship I top goalscorer: 2006–07 with 18 goals, 2008–09 with 20 goals
- Hungarian National Championship II top goalscorer: 2010–11 with 25 goals, 2013–14 with 25 goals
