= Balázs Nikolov =

Hungarian footballer

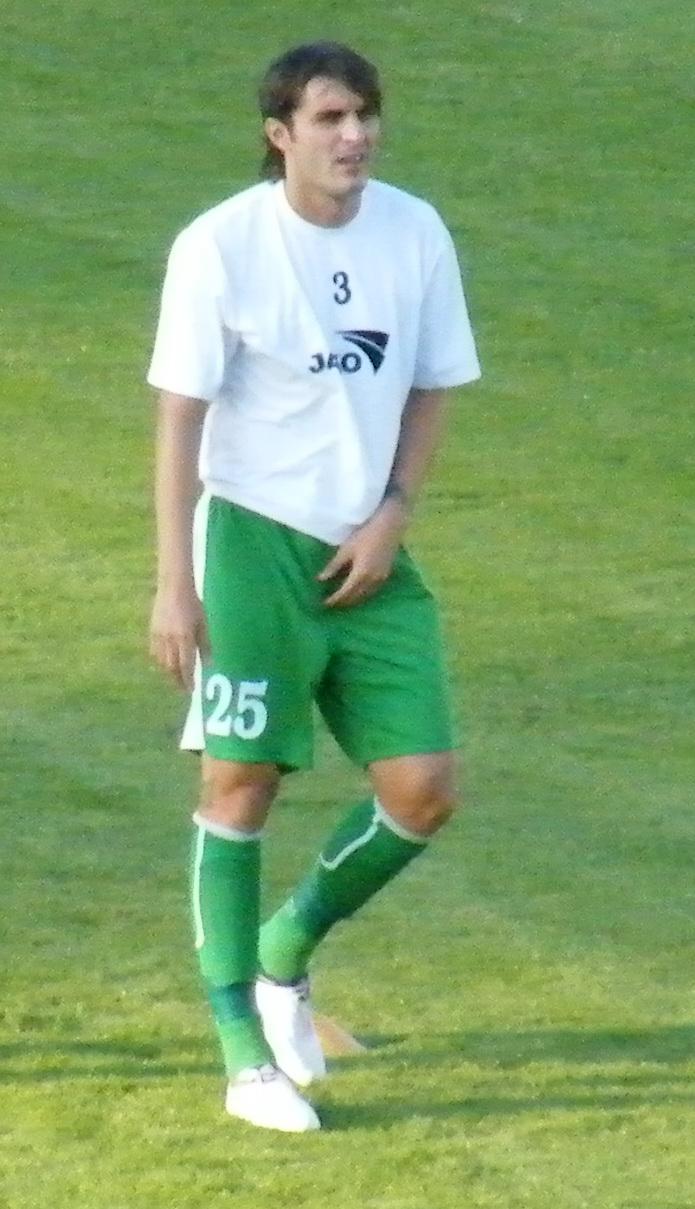
- Nikolov in 2019

Personal information
- Full name: Balázs Nikolov
- Date of birth: 4 July 1977 (age 49)
- Place of birth: Bonyhád, Hungary
- Height: 1.81 m (5 ft 11 in)
- Position: Defender

Youth career
- Paks

Senior career*
Years	Team	Apps	(Gls)
1998–1999	Paks	26	(3)
1999–2003	Dunaújváros	64	(7)
2003–2006	Debrecen	61	(2)
2006–2007	Hamarkameratene	12	(2)
2007–2009	Győr	38	(3)
2009–2010	Paks	31	(0)
2010–2012	Debrecen	13	(0)
2012–2013	Vasas	15	(5)
2013–2015	Viadukt Biatorbágy VS	26	(5)

International career
2004–2005	Hungary	3	(0)
- * Club domestic league appearances and goals as of 25 June 2013

Balázs Nikolov (born 4 July 1977) is a Hungarian former football player.

== Career ==
=== Debrecen ===
On 1 May 2012 Nikolov won the Hungarian Cup with Debrecen by beating MTK Budapest on penalty shoot-out in the 2011–12 season. This was the fifth Hungarian Cup trophy for Debrecen.

On 12 May 2012 Nikolov won the Hungarian League title with Debrecen after beating Pécs in the 28th round of the Hungarian League by 4–0 at the Oláh Gábor út Stadium which resulted the sixth Hungarian League title for the Hajdús.

== International career ==
Nikolov is of paternal Bulgarian origin and has been capped three times for the Hungary national football team.
