= Attila Dorogi =

Hungarian football player

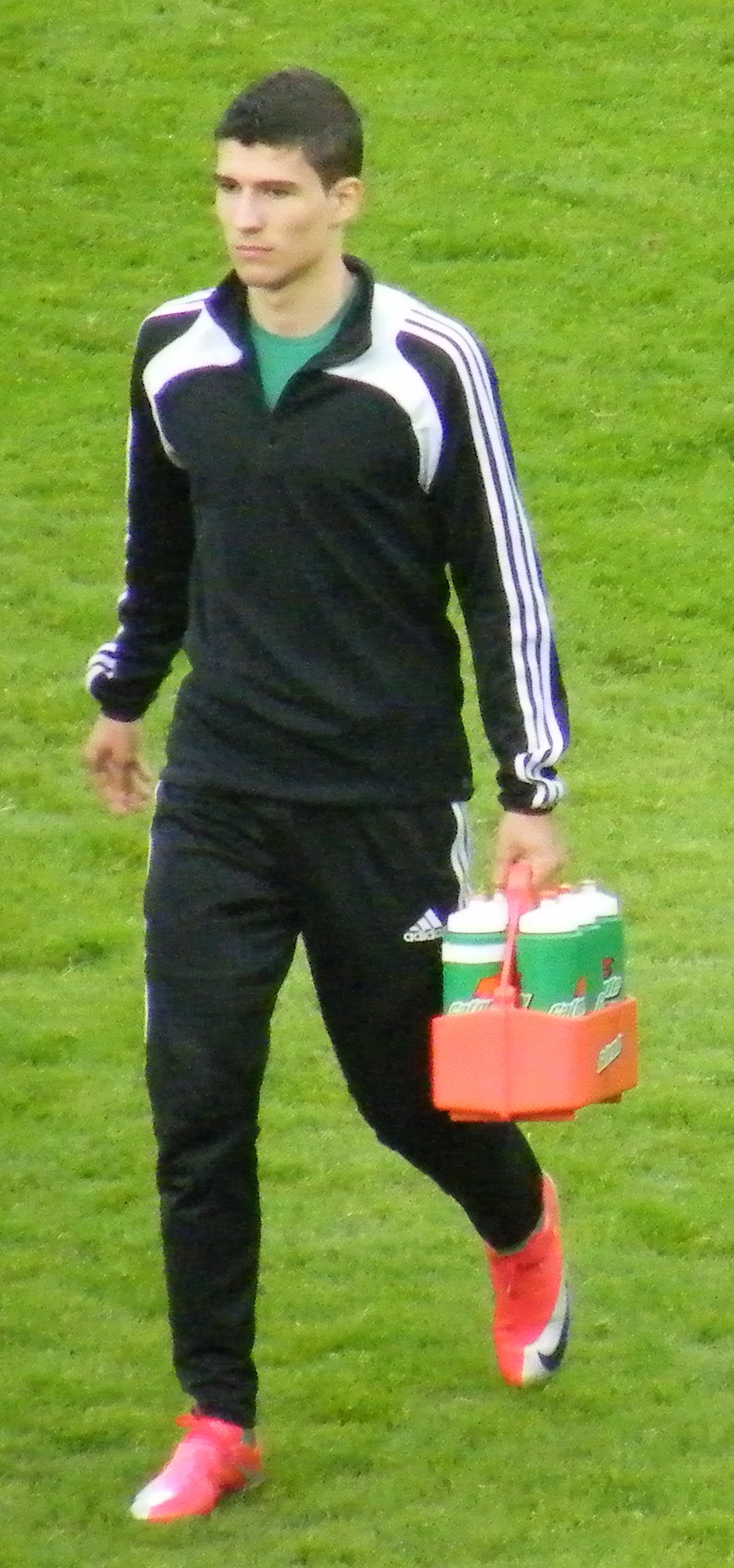

Personal information
- Full name: Attila Dorogi
- Date of birth: 18 August 1987 (age 39)
- Place of birth: Mosonmagyaróvár, Hungary
- Height: 1.85 m (6 ft 1 in)
- Position: Midfielder

Team information
- Current team: Győri ETO FC
- Number: 3

Senior career*
Years	Team	Apps	(Gls)
2008–2009	Győri ETO FC	7	(0)
2008–2009	→Győri ETO FC II	22	(4)
- * Club domestic league appearances and goals

Attila Dorogi (born 18 August 1987 in Mosonmagyaróvár) is a Hungarian football player who currently plays for Győri ETO FC.
