= István Bank =

Hungarian footballer

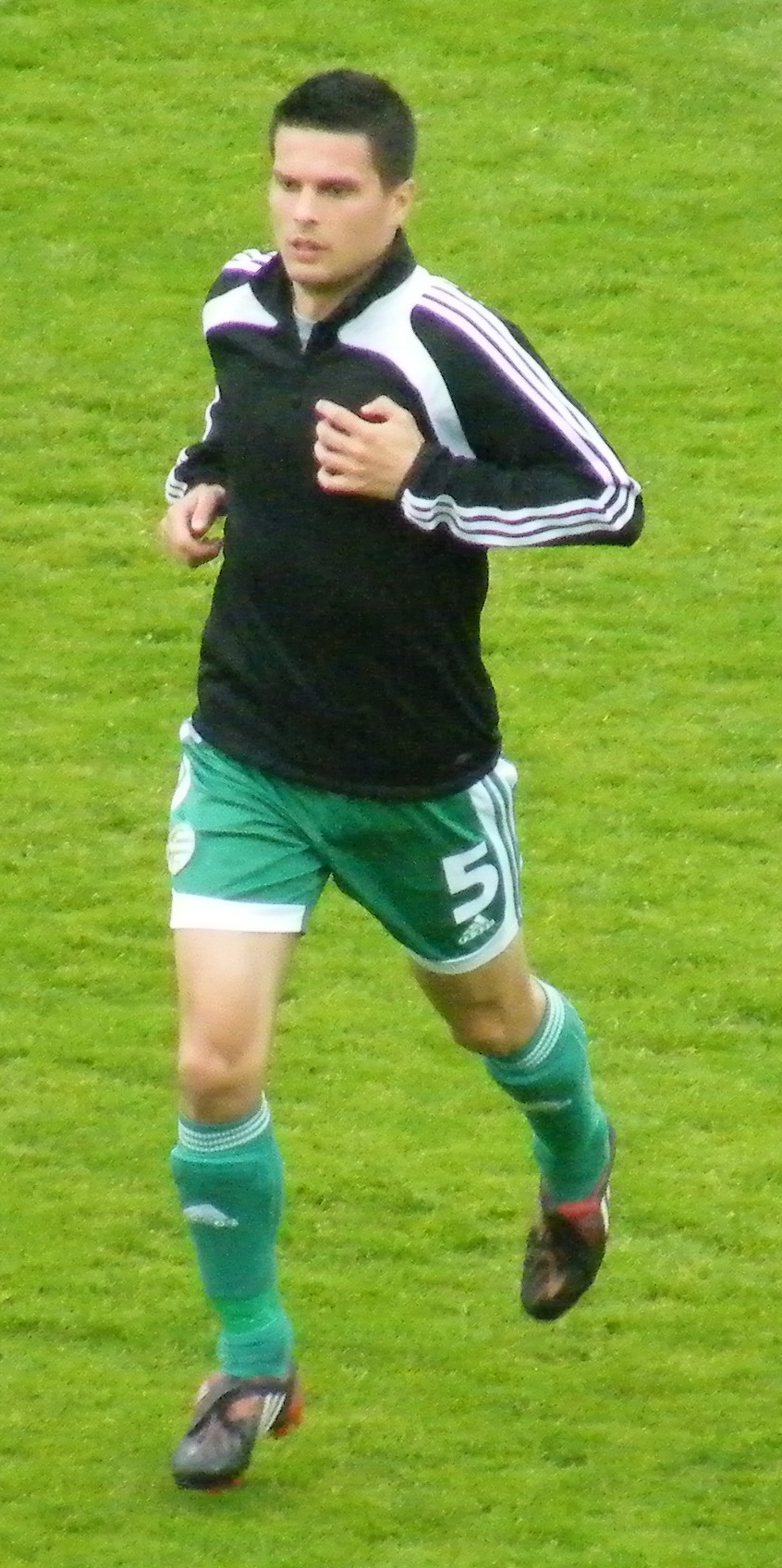

Personal information
- Date of birth: 14 April 1984 (age 42)
- Place of birth: Kaposvár, Hungary
- Height: 1.86 m (6 ft 1 in)
- Position: Midfielder

Youth career
- 1995–2003: Kaposvár

Senior career*
Years	Team	Apps	(Gls)
2003–2006	Kaposvár	48	(1)
2006–2009	Győr	72	(2)
2009–2015	Kaposvár	77	(2)

International career
1999–2000	Hungary U-15	2	(0)
2004–2006	Hungary U-21	4	(0)
- * Club domestic league appearances and goals as of 27 July 2016

István Bank (born 14 April 1984 in Kaposvár) is a Hungarian football player who currently plays for Kaposvári Rákóczi FC.
