= Zoltán Böőr =

Hungarian footballer

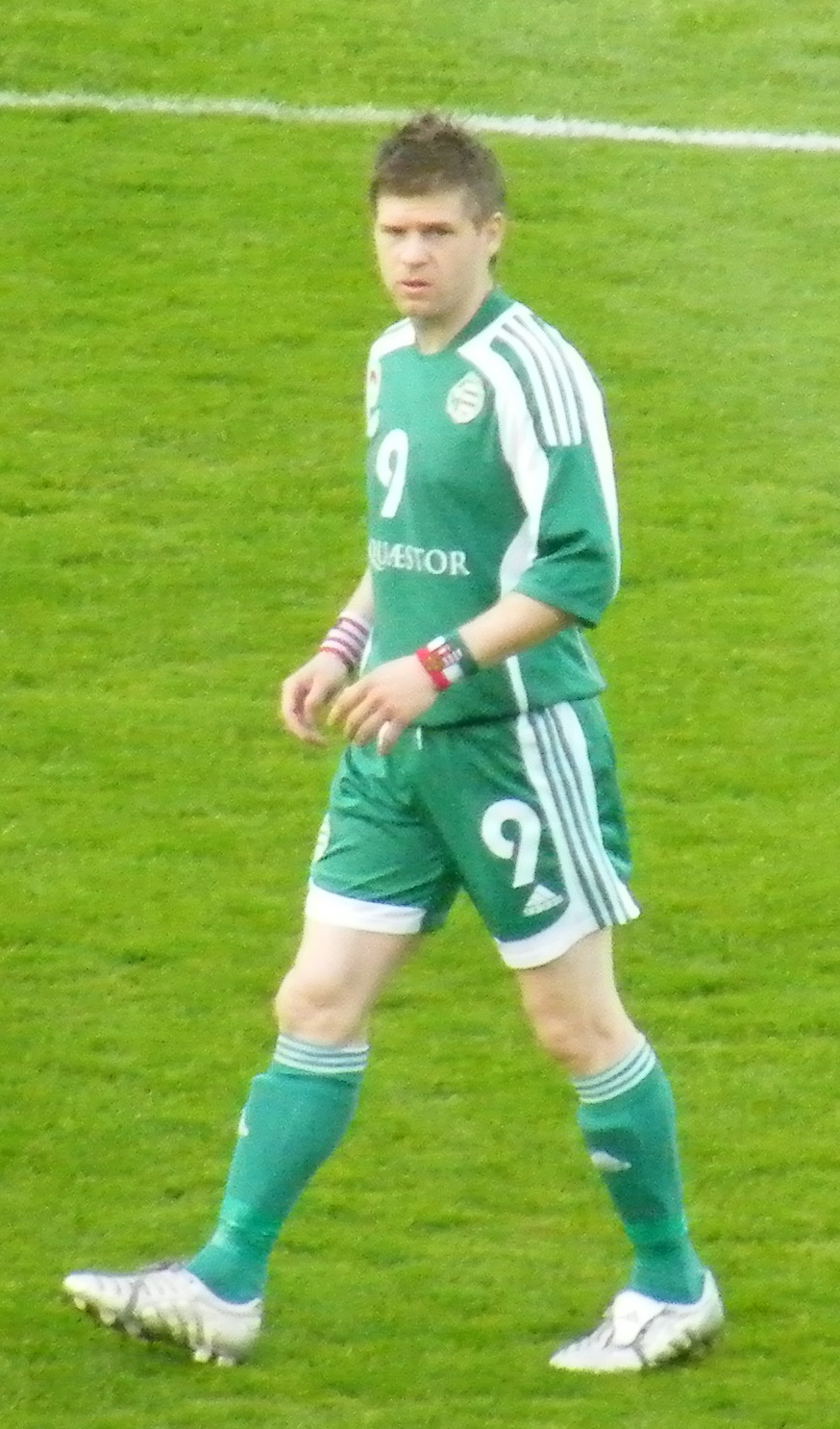

Personal information
- Full name: Zoltán Böőr
- Date of birth: 14 August 1978 (age 48)
- Place of birth: Debrecen, Hungary
- Height: 1.70 m (5 ft 7 in)
- Position: Midfielder

Senior career*
Years	Team	Apps	(Gls)
1995–2007	Debrecen	252	(24)
2005	→ Manisaspor (loan)	7	(1)
2007–2009	Győr	41	(9)
2009–2010	Nyíregyháza	0	(0)
2010–2011	Újpest	26	(3)
2011–2012	Rákospalota	23	(5)
2012–2015	Dunaújváros	78	(26)

International career
1996–1997	Hungary U-18	7	(0)
1998–2000	Hungary U-21	11	(1)
2001–2005	Hungary	21	(1)
- * Club domestic league appearances and goals as of 5 August 2015

Zoltán Böőr (born 14 August 1978 in Debrecen) is a retired Hungarian footballer. He was a member of the Hungarian XI and scored his only goal against San Marino during the UEFA Euro 2004 qualifying on 11 June 2003.

Böőr previously played for Manisaspor in the Turkish Super Lig.
