= Dániel Völgyi =

Hungarian footballer

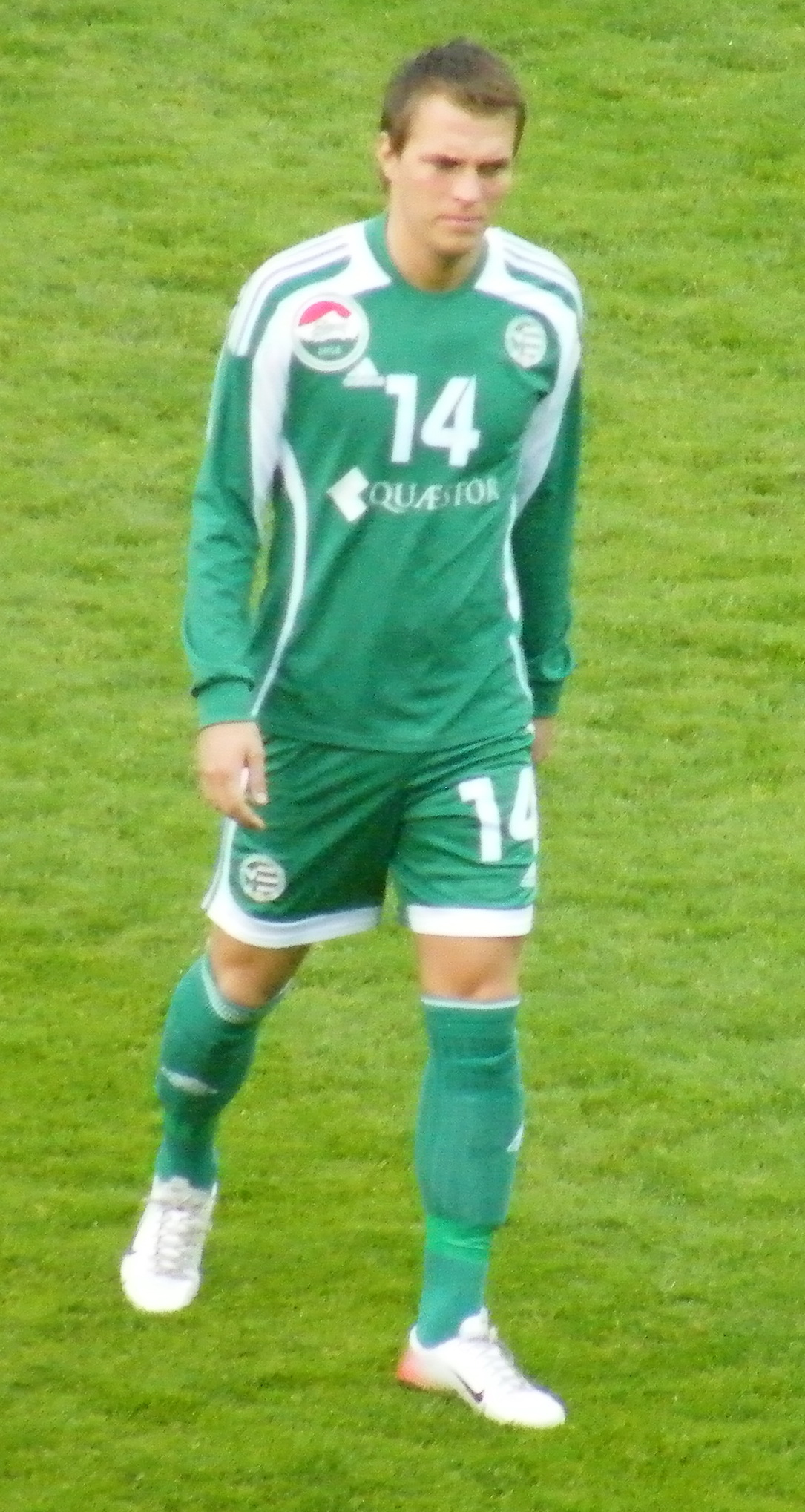

Personal information
- Full name: Dániel Völgyi
- Date of birth: 7 June 1987 (age 39)
- Place of birth: Szeged, Hungary
- Height: 1.87 m (6 ft 2 in)
- Position: Midfielder

Team information
- Current team: Nyköping
- Number: 24

Senior career*
| Years | Team | Apps | (Gls) |
| 2004–2005 | Tisza Volán | 20 | (0) |
| 2005–2006 | Vasas | 11 | (0) |
| 2006–2007 | Újpest | 7 | (0) |
| 2007–2015 | Győr | 139 | (19) |
| 2010 | → Paks (loan) | 7 | (0) |
| 2015 | → Pápa (loan) | 9 | (0) |
| 2015–2016 | Gyirmót | 28 | (2) |
| 2016–2017 | Debrecen | 7 | (0) |
| 2017–2019 | Győr | 24 | (2) |
| 2019–2020 | Soroksár | 3 | (1) |
| 2020– | Nyköping | 0 | (0) |

International career
| 2003–2004 | Hungary U-17 | 3 | (1) |
| 2005–2006 | Hungary U-19 | 3 | (0) |
| 2007–2008 | Hungary U-21 | | |
- * Club domestic league appearances and goals as of 6:30, 31 July 2020 (UTC)

Dániel Völgyi (born 7 June 1987 in Szeged) is a Hungarian football player who currently plays for Swedish club Nyköpings BIS.

== Career ==
=== Soroksár ===
On 29 August 2019, Völgyi announced on Facebook, that he had joined Soroksár SC.
