= Máté Kiss =

Hungarian footballer

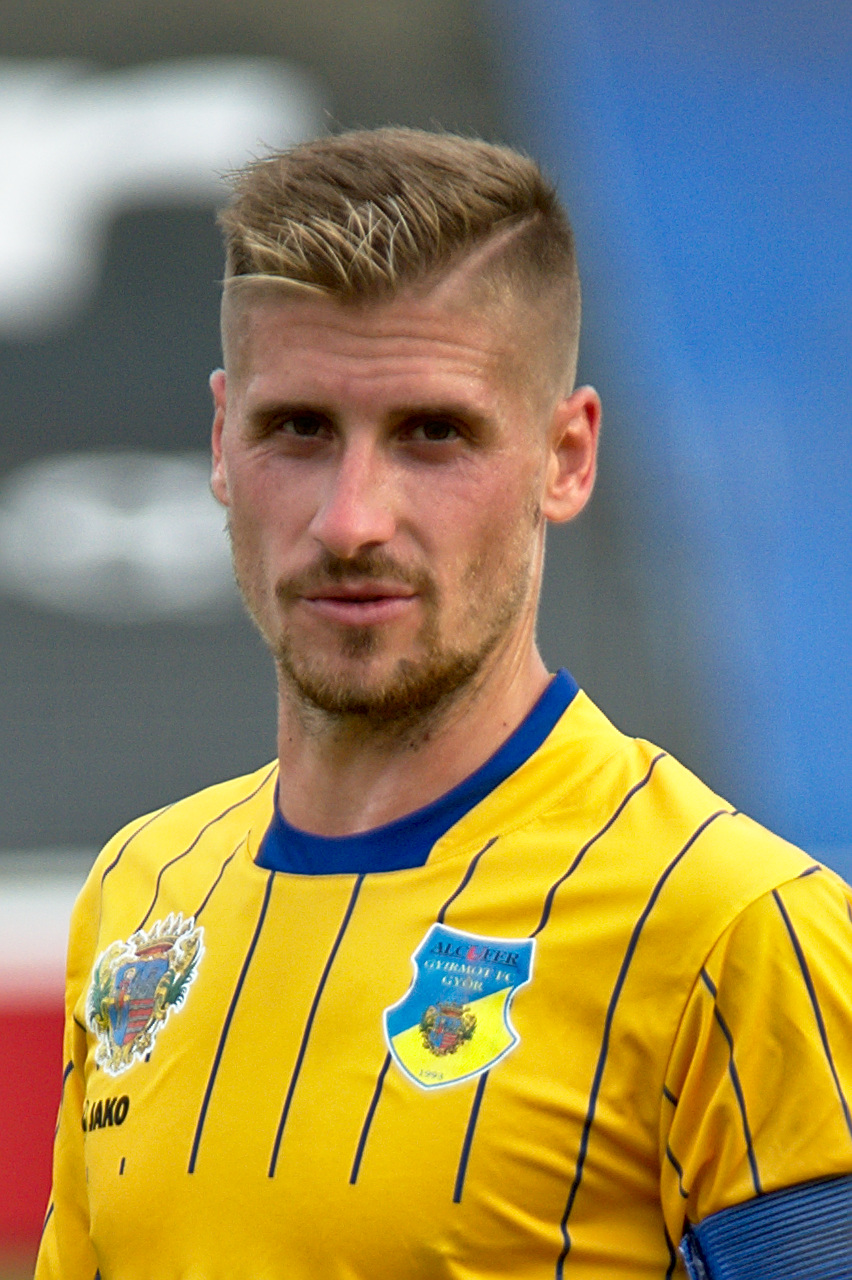

Personal information
- Full name: Máté Kiss
- Date of birth: 30 April 1991 (age 35)
- Place of birth: Győr, Hungary
- Height: 1.80 m (5 ft 11 in)
- Position: Midfielder

Team information
- Current team: Győr
- Number: 91

Youth career
- 2007–2009: Győr

Senior career*
Years	Team	Apps	(Gls)
2008–2015	Győr	40	(2)
2012–2013	→ Siófok (loan)	18	(2)
2013–2014	→ Mezőkövesd (loan)	18	(0)
2014–2015	→ Gyirmót (loan)	24	(1)
2015–2018	Gyirmót	96	(11)
2018–2020	Zalaegerszeg	36	(1)
2020–	Győr	94	(6)

International career
2009–2010	Hungary U-20	5	(1)
2010–2012	Hungary U-21	7	(0)
- * Club domestic league appearances and goals as of 12 August 2024

Máté Kiss (born 30 April 1991, in Győr) is a Hungarian football player who currently plays for Győri ETO FC.

== Career ==
Kiss began his career with Győri ETO FC and was in 2008 promoted to the senior team; he gave his debut on 10 April 2009 against MTK Hungária FC.

== International career ==
He presented his country at 2009 FIFA U-20 World Cup in Egypt. He played three games and his sole goal scored became the Goal of the Tournament.

== Career statistics ==
Appearances and goals by club, season and competition
Club	Season	League		Cup		League Cup		Europe		Total	
Club	Season	Apps	Goals	Apps	Goals	Apps	Goals	Apps	Goals	Apps	Goals
Győr
Győr	2007–08	2	0	0	0	8	0	0	0	10	0
Győr	2008–09	6	1	0	0	11	2	0	0	17	3
Győr	2009–10	9	0	2	0	7	0	0	0	18	0
Győr	2010–11	18	1	0	0	0	0	1	0	19	1
Győr	2011–12	5	0	2	0	4	2	0	0	11	2
Győr	Total	40	2	4	0	30	4	1	0	75	6
Siófok
Siófok	2012–13	18	2	5	0	3	0	0	0	26	2
Siófok	Total	18	2	5	0	3	0	0	0	26	2
Mezőkövesd
Mezőkövesd	2013–14	18	0	1	0	7	1	0	0	26	1
Mezőkövesd	Total	18	0	1	0	7	1	0	0	26	1
Career total		76	4	10	0	40	5	1	0	127	9

Updated to games played as of 11 May 2014.

== Honours ==
- FIFA U-20 World Cup:
  - Third place: 2009
