= Zoran Šupić =

Bosnian Serb footballer

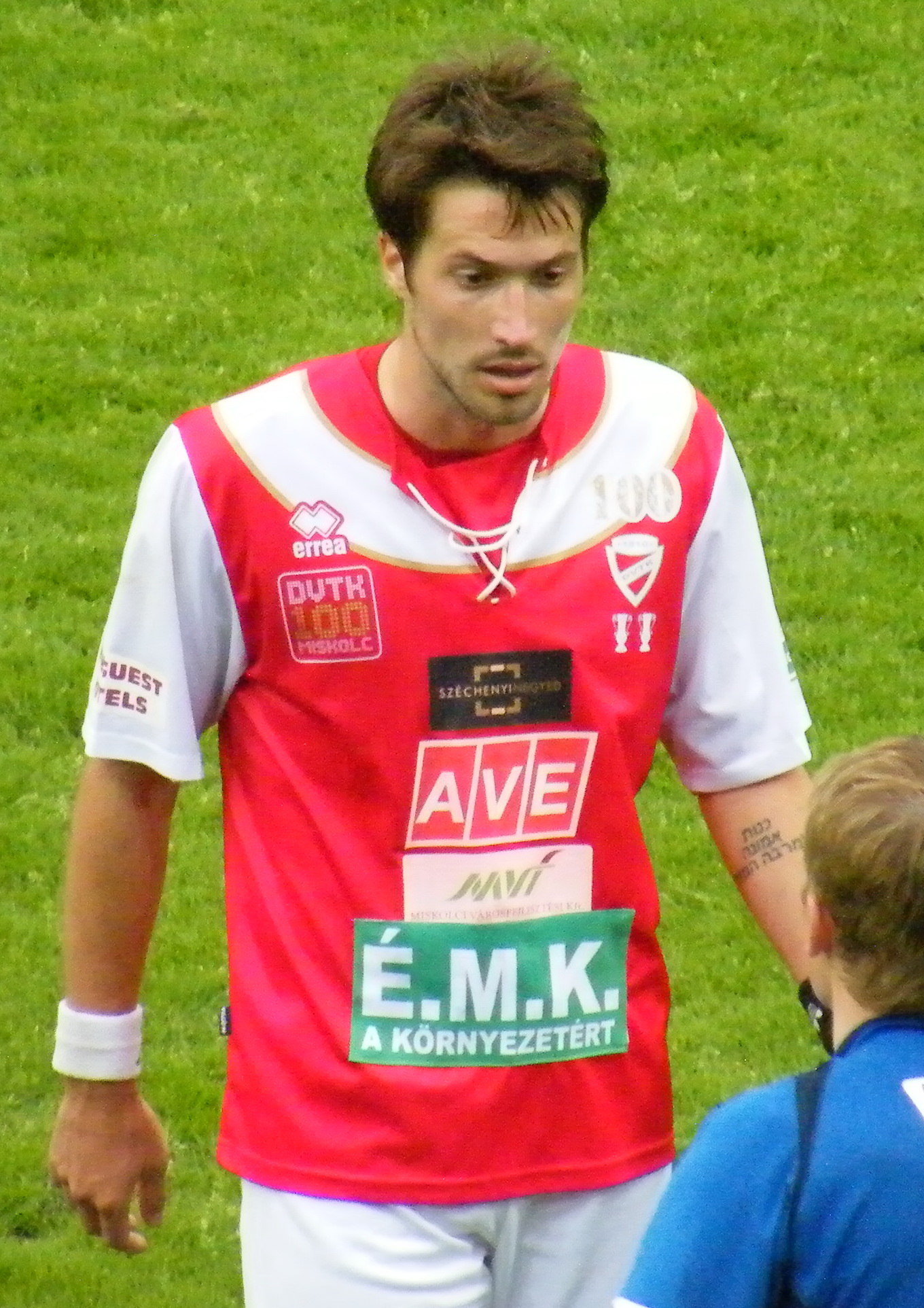

Personal information
- Full name: Zoran Šupić
- Date of birth: July 21, 1984 (age 42)
- Place of birth: Banja Luka, SFR Yugoslavia
- Height: 1.91 m (6 ft 3 in)
- Position: Defender

Youth career
- 1998–2001: Sparta Prague
- 2001: Remont Čačak

Senior career*
Years	Team	Apps	(Gls)
2002	Remont Čačak	15	(1)
2002–2007	OFK Beograd	21	(0)
2004	→ Metalac Gornji Milanovac (loan)	10	(0)
2005	→ Bežanija (loan)	26	(0)
2007	Bežanija	10	(0)
2007–2011	Győri ETO	50	(0)
2010	→ Diósgyőr (loan)	12	(0)
2010–2011	→ Pápa (loan)	20	(0)
2011–2012	Novi Pazar	10	(0)
2012–2013	BSK Borča	9	(0)
2013	UTA Arad	6	(0)
2013	Pápa	12	(0)
2014	BSK Borča	18	(1)
2015	Travnik	6	(0)
2015-2016	OFK Odžaci		
2019	Icanfield		
- * Club domestic league appearances and goals as of 8 April 2015

Zoran Šupić (Serbian Cyrillic: Зоран Шупић; born July 21, 1984) is a Bosnian Serb retired football player.

== Club career ==
Born in Banja Luka, SR Bosnia and Herzegovina, Šupić spent most of his career in Serbia, where he played for second-level sides FK Remont Čačak and FK Metalac Gornji Milanovac, and then top-league sides OFK Beograd, FK Bežanija, FK Novi Pazar and FK BSK Borča.

Then he also played in Hungary with top-level sides Győri ETO FC, Diósgyőri VTK and Lombard-Pápa TFC, and in Romanian Liga II with UTA Arad. During the winter break of the 2014–15 season he joined Bosnian top-level side NK Travnik.
