= Arsène Copa =

Gabonese footballer

Personal information
- Full name: Arsène Copa
- Date of birth: 7 June 1988 (age 38)
- Place of birth: Moanda, Gabon
- Height: 1.77 m (5 ft 10 in)
- Position: Attacking midfielder

Team information
- Current team: AS Mangasport

Youth career
- Missile

Senior career*
| Years | Team | Apps | (Gls) |
| 2003–2007 | Mangasport | 115 | (27) |
| 2008–2011 | Győri ETO FC | 21 | (2) |
| 2012 | DAC Dunajská Streda | 4 | (2) |
| 2012–2016 | Mangasport | | |
| 2016– | Pélican | | |

International career^{‡}
| 2007– | Gabon | 9 | (0) |
- * Club domestic league appearances and goals as of 26 May 2013 ‡ National team caps and goals as of 31 May 2012

Arsène Copa (born 7 June 1988 in Moanda) is a Gabonese footballer, who currently plays for Pélican.

== International career ==
The midfielder is a member of the Gabon national football team.
