= György Józsi =

Hungarian footballer

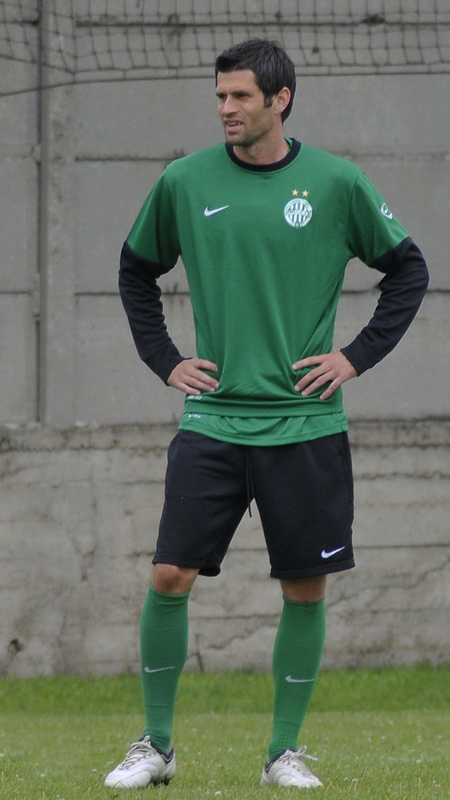

Personal information
- Date of birth: 31 January 1983 (age 43)
- Place of birth: Zalaegerszeg, Hungary
- Height: 1.82 m (6 ft 0 in)
- Position: Midfielder

Team information
- Current team: Dunaújváros
- Number: 8

Senior career*
Years	Team	Apps	(Gls)
2000–2007	Zalaegerszeg	101	(19)
2001	→ Nagykanizsa (loan)	?	(?)
2004	→ Slavia Praha (loan)	12	(0)
2007–2010	Győr	80	(12)
2010–2014	Ferencváros	86	(6)
2014–	Dunaújváros	9	(0)

International career
1998–1999	Hungary U-15	3	(0)
1999–2000	Hungary U-16	6	(0)
- * Club domestic league appearances and goals as of 26 October 2014

György Józsi (born 31 January 1983 in Zalaegerszeg) is a Hungarian football player who currently plays for Ferencvárosi TC.

== Career ==
=== Győri ETO FC ===
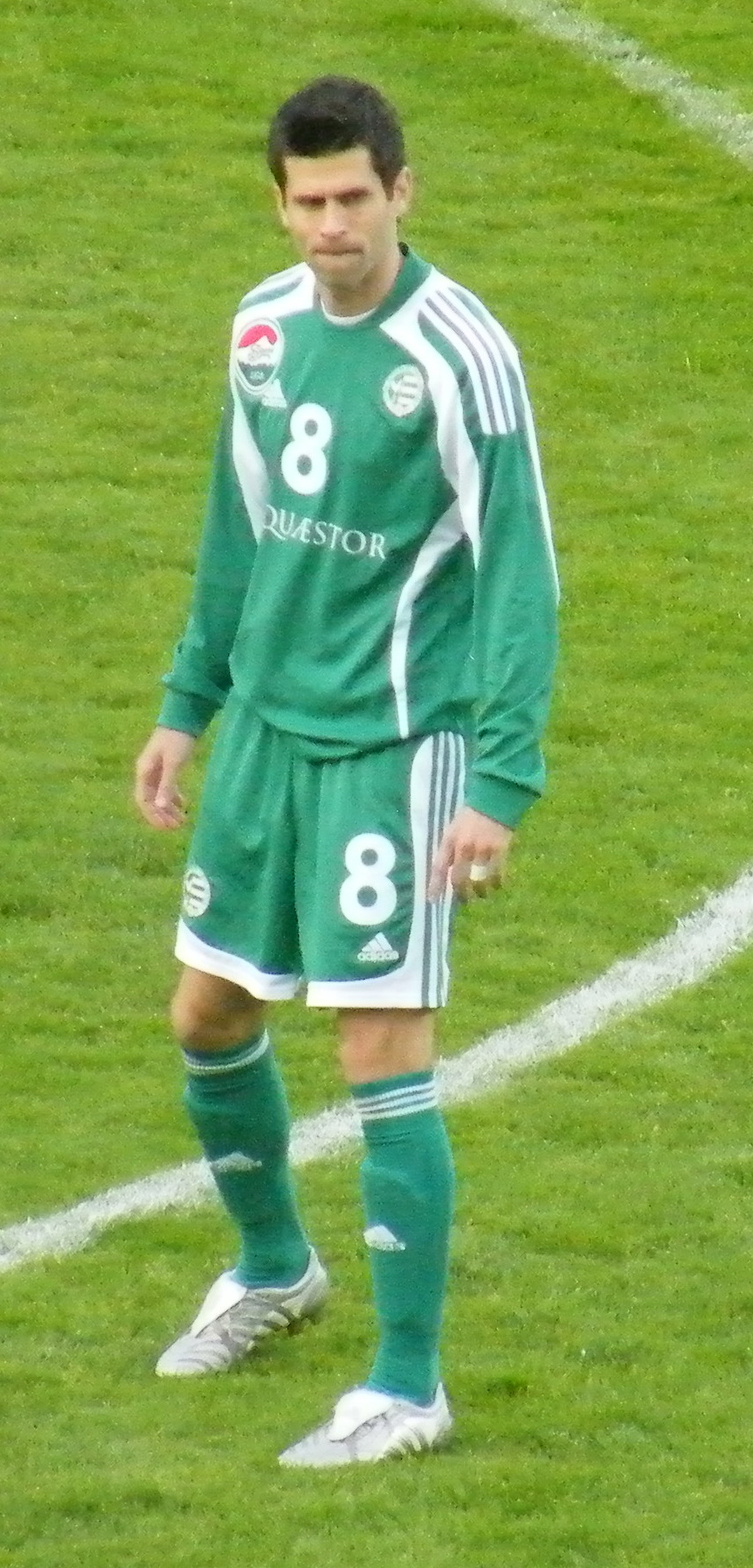
Józsi in Győri ETO

== Honours ==
Ferencváros

- Hungarian League Cup (1): 2012–13
