= Zoltán Kovács (footballer, born 1986) =

Hungarian footballer

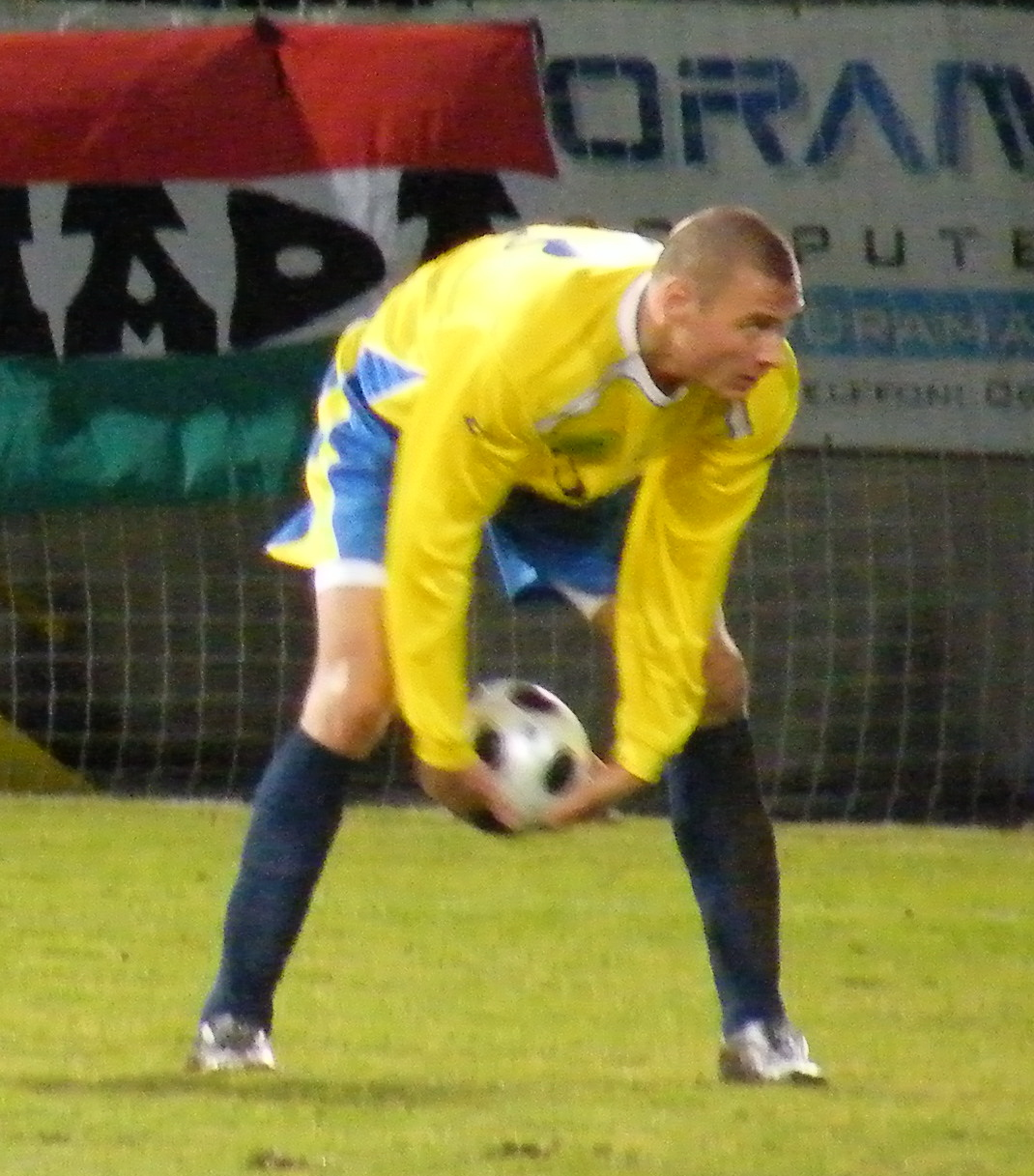

Personal information
- Date of birth: 16 December 1986
- Place of birth: Budapest, Hungary
- Date of death: 27 August 2013 (aged 26)
- Place of death: Budapest, Hungary
- Height: 1.93 m (6 ft 4 in)
- Position: Defender

Youth career
- 2003–2005: Budapest Honvéd FC

Senior career*
Years	Team	Apps	(Gls)
2005–2006	Budapest Honvéd	15	(1)
2006–2010	Győri ETO FC	38	(1)
2008–2009	→ Győri ETO FC II	6	(1)
2009	→ Rákospalotai EAC (loan)	11	(0)
2009	→ Nyíregyháza Spartacus (loan)	1	(0)
2010	→ Rákospalotai EAC (loan)	12	(0)
2010–2012	Vecsési FC	42	(4)

International career
2007–2008	Hungary U-21		
- * Club domestic league appearances and goals

Zoltán Kovács (16 December 1986 − 27 August 2013) was a Hungarian football player.
