= László Varga (footballer) =

Australian-born Hungarian footballer

László Varga Robert
Personal information
- Full name: László Varga Robert
- Date of birth: 25 August 1987 (age 39)
- Place of birth: Sydney, Australia
- Height: 1.84 m (6 ft 0 in)
- Position: Midfielder

Team information
- Current team: BFC Siófok
- Number: 13

Youth career
- 2002–2008: Sydney FC

Senior career*
Years	Team	Apps	(Gls)
2008	Logan United FC		
2008–2010	Győri ETO FC		
2010–2013	Gyirmót SE	39	(2)
2013—2014	BFC Siófok	0	(0)
- * Club domestic league appearances and goals

László Varga Robert (born 25 August 1987 in Sydney) is a Hungarian football player who currently plays for BFC Siófok.
