= Imre Csermelyi =

Hungarian football player

Personal information
- Full name: Imre Csermelyi
- Date of birth: 29 August 1988 (age 38)
- Place of birth: Kapuvár, Hungary
- Height: 1.90 m (6 ft 3 in)
- Position: Striker

Team information
- Current team: Lombard-Pápa TFC
- Number: 42

Youth career
- 2002–2003: Győri ETO FC
- 2003–2004: Gyirmót SE
- 2004–2006: Ferencvárosi TC

Senior career*
Years	Team	Apps	(Gls)
2006–2010	Győri ETO FC	9	(1)
2008–2010	→ Győri ETO FC II	34	(17)
2010	Gyirmót SE	11	(2)
2010–2012	BFC Siófok	19	(1)
2012	Lombard-Pápa TFC	2	(0)
- * Club domestic league appearances and goals as of 17 March 2012

Imre Csermelyi (born 29 August 1988, in Kapuvár) is a Hungarian football player who currently plays for Lombard-Pápa TFC.
