= Tibor Tokody =

Hungarian footballer

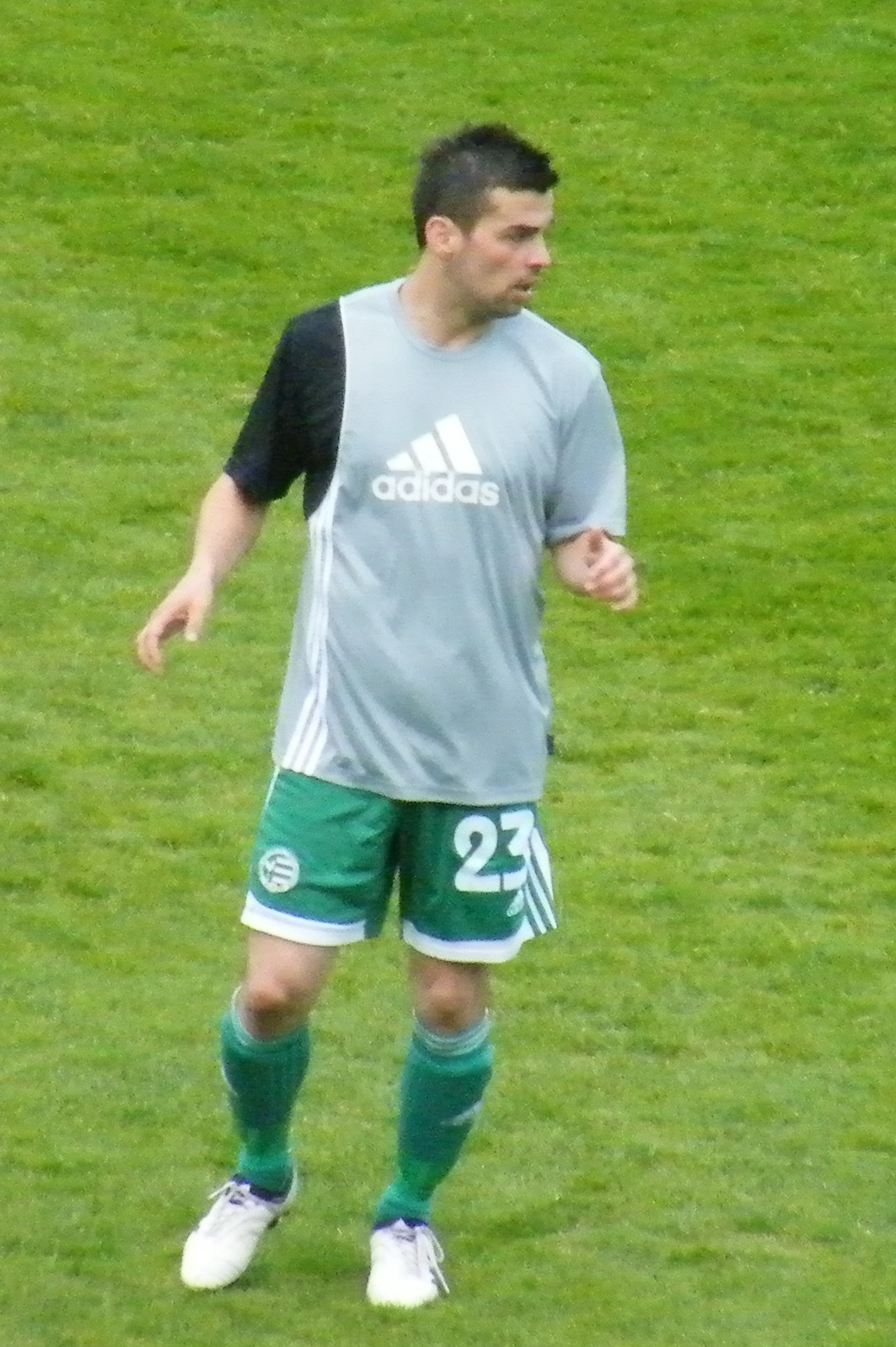

Personal information
- Date of birth: 1 September 1980 (age 46)
- Place of birth: Budapest, Hungary
- Height: 1.89 m (6 ft 2 1/2 in)
- Position: Forward

Senior career*
| Years | Team | Apps | (Gls) |
| 1998–2003 | Újpest FC | 121 | (28) |
| 1999 | → Monori SE (loan) | 1 | (0) |
| 2004–2005 | Rot-Weiß Oberhausen | 32 | (6) |
| 2005–2006 | Wuppertaler SV Borussia | 22 | (2) |
| 2006–2013 | Győr | 129 | (11) |
| 2015–2016 | Mosonmagyaróvár | 8 | (0) |
| 2016 | STC Salgótarján | | |

International career
| 1996–1997 | Hungary U-16 | 16 | (0) |
| 1998–1999 | Hungary U-18 | 5 | (0) |
| 1999–2000 | Hungary U-21 | 1 | (0) |
| 2001–2003 | Hungary | 2 | (1) |

Managerial career
- 2014–2015: Győr (assistant)
- 2015: Győr (caretaker)
- * Club domestic league appearances and goals

Tibor Tokody (born 1 September 1980) is a Hungarian football coach and a former player. He played as a forward.
