= Attila Sánta =

Hungarian footballer

Sánta Attila
Personal information
- Full name: Attila Sánta
- Date of birth: 22 August 1988 (age 38)
- Place of birth: Kalocsa, Hungary
- Height: 1.75 m (5 ft 9 in)
- Position: Midfielder

Team information
- Current team: Dabas

Youth career
- Győri ETO

Senior career*
Years	Team	Apps	(Gls)
2008–2010	Győri ETO	6	(0)
2010–2011	VLS Veszprém	13	(1)
2011	Kecskemét	1	(0)
2011–2015	Budaörs	94	(24)
2015–2017	Cegléd		
2017–2019	BKV Előre		
2019–	Dabas	14	(0)
- * Club domestic league appearances and goals as of 14:34, 25 November 2019 (UTC)

Attila Sánta (born 22 August 1988 in Kalocsa) is a Hungarian football player who currently plays for FC Dabas.
