= Antal Jäkl =

Hungarian footballer

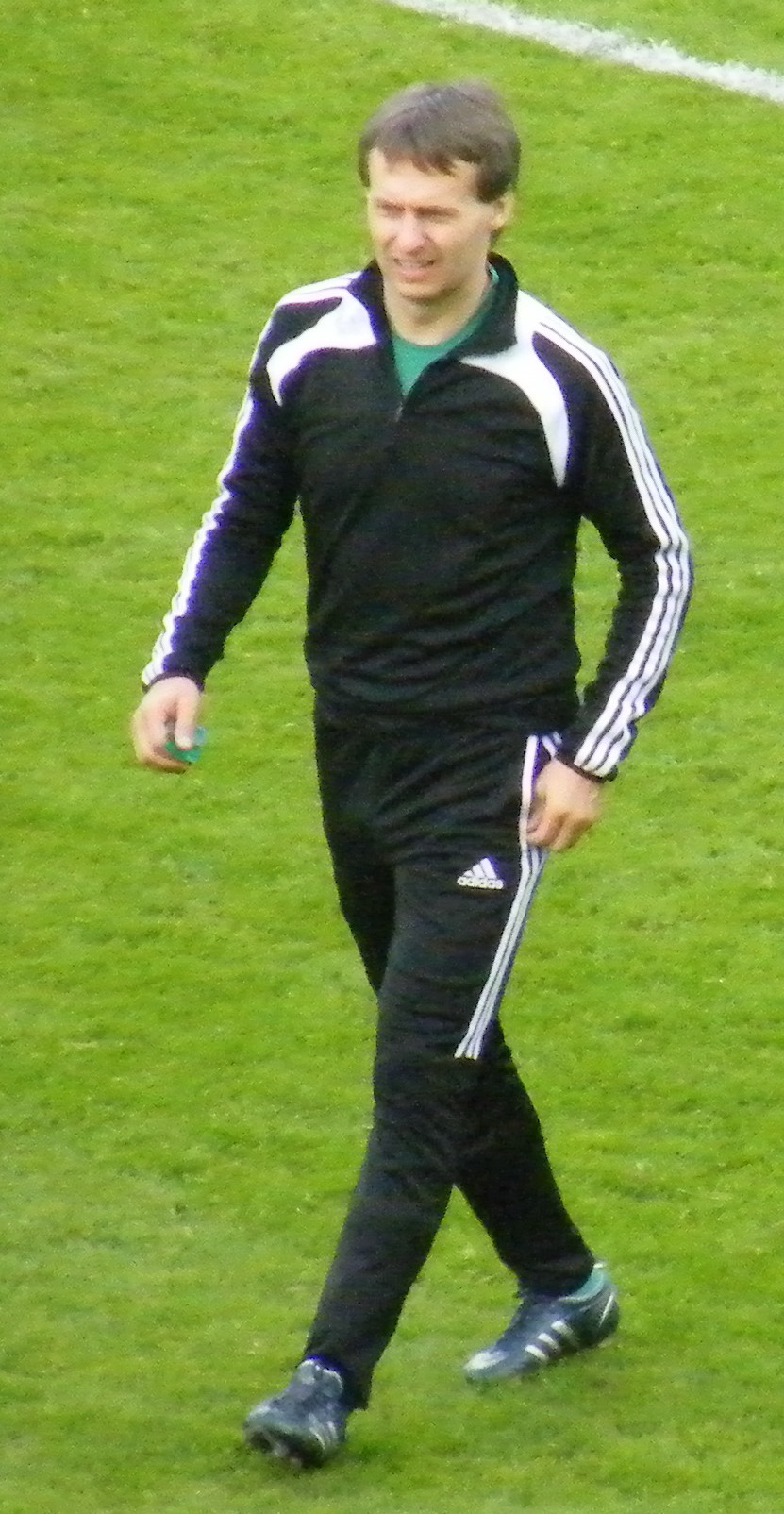

Personal information
- Date of birth: 18 November 1971 (age 54)
- Place of birth: Beremend, Hungary
- Height: 1.80 m (5 ft 11 in)
- Position: Midfielder

Senior career*
Years	Team	Apps	(Gls)
1989–1994	Beremendi SK	?	(?)
1994–1996	Pécsi MFC	49	(2)
1996–1997	Pécsi Vasutas SK	28	(1)
1997–2003	Dunaújváros FC	122	(5)
2003–2009	Győri ETO FC	159	(6)
- * Club domestic league appearances and goals as of 4 August 2015

Antal Jäkl (born 18 November 1971 in Beremend) is a Hungarian football player who retired.
