= Péter Stark =

Hungarian footballer

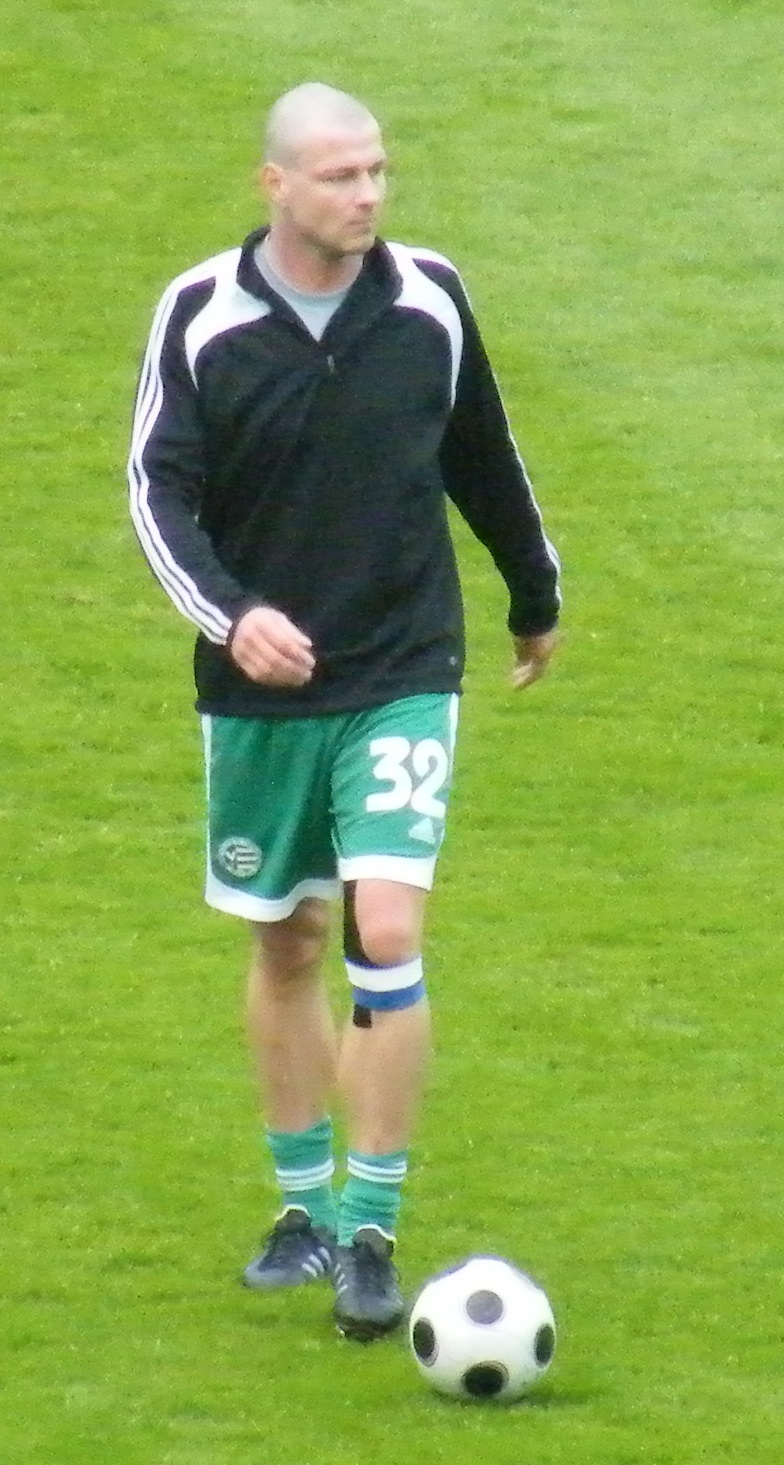

Personal information
- Full name: Péter Csaba Stark
- Date of birth: 17 August 1978 (age 48)
- Place of birth: Kazincbarcika, Hungary
- Height: 1.93 m (6 ft 4 in)
- Position: Defender

Team information
- Current team: Pécsi Mecsek FC

Senior career*
Years	Team	Apps	(Gls)
1996–1999	Győri ETO FC	92	(2)
1999	Kocaelispor	2	(0)
2000–2009	Győri ETO FC	190	(14)
2009–2011	Pécsi MFC	37	(9)

International career
1996–1997	Hungary U-18	10	(0)
1998–2000	Hungary U-21	12	(2)
2004–2005	Hungary	19	(0)
- * Club domestic league appearances and goals as of 4 August 2015

Péter Csaba Stark (born 17 August 1978 in Kazincbarcika) is a Hungarian football player who currently plays for Pécsi Mecsek FC.
