= Eugene Fomumbod =

Cameroonian footballer

Eugéne Fomumbod
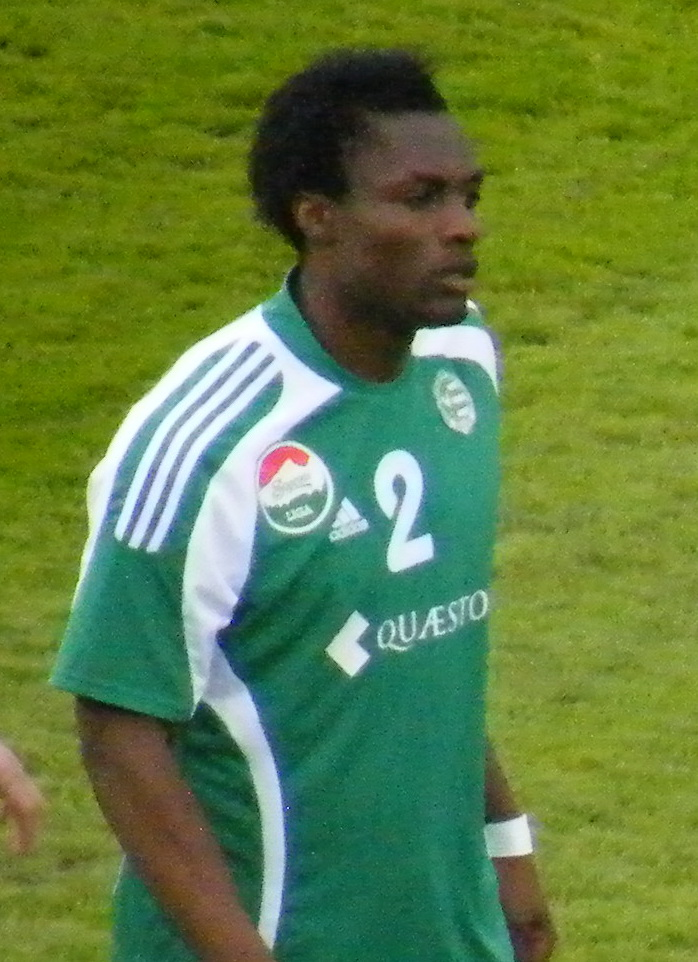

Personal information
- Full name: Eugéne Eyah Fomumbod
- Date of birth: February 22, 1985 (age 41)
- Place of birth: Buea, Cameroon
- Height: 1.87 m (6 ft 2 in)
- Position: Defensive midfielder

Team information
- Current team: Veszprém
- Number: 17

Youth career
- 1999–2004: Limbé

Senior career*
Years	Team	Apps	(Gls)
2004–2005	Aris	2	(0)
2005–2008	Siófok	41	(1)
2008–2011	Győr	38	(0)
2008–2009	→ Siófok (loan)	3	(0)
2008–2011	→ Győr II	21	(2)
2012	Siófok	3	(0)
2012–2013	Veszprém	6	(0)
2019–2021	Örkény	23	(6)
- * Club domestic league appearances and goals as of 24 June 2013

Eugéne Fomumbod (born February 22, 1985, in Buea, Cameroon) is a Cameroonian football midfielders player who currently plays for Veszprém FC.
