= List of Hungarian football transfers summer 2013 =

This is a list of Hungarian football transfers for the 2013 summer transfer window by club. Only transfers of clubs in the OTP Bank Liga will be included.

The summer transfer window opened on 1 June 2013, although a few transfers may have taken place prior to that date. The window closed at midnight on 31 August 2013. Players without a club may join one at any time, either during or in between transfer windows.

== OTP Bank Liga ==
=== Budapest Honvéd ===
In: Note: Flags indicate national team as defined under FIFA eligibility rules; some limited exceptions apply. Players may hold more than one non-FIFA nationality.

No.	Pos.	Nation	Player
2	DF	HUN	Dávid Bobál (from Honvéd Academy)
5	DF	HUN	Endre Botka (from Honvéd Academy)
6	DF	HUN	János Kovács (from (England) Luton Town)
9	FW	COL	Edixon Perea (from (Chile) Changchun Yatai)
11	MF	SOM	Ayub Daud (from (Switzerland) Chiasso)
13	DF	ITA	Raffaele Alcibiade (from (Italy) Juventus)
13	DF	HUN	Gyula Csemer (from Honvéd Academy)
14	FW	GHA	Emmanel Mensah (from (Ghana) United Soccer Training Academy)
17	MF	PAN	Aníbal Godoy (from (Panama) Chepo)
20	MF	HUN	Dániel Prosser (from Honvéd Academy)
21	FW	ITA	Andrea Mancini (from (Spain) Valladolid B)
23	FW	ITA	Emanuele Testardi (loan from (Italy) Sampdoria)
29	MF	HUN	Richárd Kozma (from Honvéd Academy)
32	MF	HUN	Richárd Czár (loan return from (Austria) First Vienna)
34	GK	HUN	Norbert Szemerédi (from Honvéd II)
41	MF	CMR	Thomas Job (from (Italy) Bologna)

Out: Note: Flags indicate national team as defined under FIFA eligibility rules; some limited exceptions apply. Players may hold more than one non-FIFA nationality.

No.	Pos.	Nation	Player
3	DF	SEN	Souleymane Tandia
5	DF	HUN	András Debreceni (to Diósgyőr)
6	MF	MLI	Mamadou Diakité (to (Italy) Crotone)
9	FW	HUN	Gergely Délczeg (loan to Paks)
11	FW	ITA	Davide Lanzafame (loan return to (Italy) Catania)
13	DF	ITA	Raffaele Alcibiade (loan return to (Italy) Juventus)
15	FW	ITA	Leandro Martínez (to Győr)
20	MF	HUN	Gellért Ivancsics (to Pápa)
22	FW	CIV	Souleymane Diaby
23	FW	ITA	Emanuele Testardi (loan return to (Italy) Sampdoria)
23	DF	ROU	Claudiu Pascariu (to (Romania) Atletic Arad)
27	FW	CMR	Hervé Tchami (to (Poland) Pogoń Szczecin)
29	DF	HUN	Alexisz Novák (to Siófok)
32	MF	HUN	Richárd Czár (loan to Sopron)
35	MF	NGA	Henry Odia (to (Moldova) Dacia Chișinău)
90	MF	NGA	Marshal Johnson

=== Debrecen ===
In: Note: Flags indicate national team as defined under FIFA eligibility rules; some limited exceptions apply. Players may hold more than one non-FIFA nationality.

No.	Pos.	Nation	Player
4	MF	CIV	Joël Damahou (from (Israel) Hapoel Ra'anana)
5	DF	SRB	Aleksandar Trninić (from (Serbia) Čukarički)
6	MF	HUN	László Zsidai (from MTK)
13	DF	HUN	Pál Lázár (from Pécs)
14	MF	HUN	Dániel Vadnai (from MTK)
14	FW	NGA	Eugène Salami (loan return from Kecskemét)
16	DF	HUN	Martin Króner (from Vác)
19	FW	SVN	Dalibor Volaš (from (Russia) Mordovia)
20	FW	HUN	Zoltán Horváth (from Eger)
24	DF	EST	Igor Morozov (from (Poland) Polonia Warsaw)
25	DF	SRB	Dušan Brković (from (Israel) Hapoel Haifa)
33	MF	HUN	József Varga (loan return from (Germany) Greuther Fürth)
85	FW	ROU	Cristian Bud (from (Romania) Cluj)
88	FW	FRA	L´Imam Seydi (from Diósgyőr)
91	FW	HUN	Ádám Balajti (loan return from MTK)

Out: Note: Flags indicate national team as defined under FIFA eligibility rules; some limited exceptions apply. Players may hold more than one non-FIFA nationality.

No.	Pos.	Nation	Player
2	DF	HUN	István Szűcs (loan to Békéscsaba)
4	DF	GER	Dajan Šimac (to (Turkey) Denizlispor)
6	MF	HON	Luis Ramos (to (France) Châteauroux)
14	FW	NGA	Eugène Salami (to (Czech Republic) Teplice)
20	FW	HUN	Zoltán Horváth (Suspended)
30	FW	BIH	Stevo Nikolić
33	MF	HUN	József Varga (loan to (England) Middlesbrough)
37	MF	BRA	Lucas (loan to Békéscsaba)
39	FW	FRA	Adamo Coulibaly (to (France) Lens)
60	FW	HUN	Péter Pölöskey (loan to Pécs)
77	MF	HUN	Péter Czvitkovics (to Puskás)
85	FW	ROU	Cristian Bud (to (Romania) Gaz Metan)
91	FW	HUN	Ádám Balajti (loan to Mezőkövesd)
92	DF	FRA	Mamadou Wague (to Puskás)

=== Diósgyőr ===
In: Note: Flags indicate national team as defined under FIFA eligibility rules; some limited exceptions apply. Players may hold more than one non-FIFA nationality.

No.	Pos.	Nation	Player
1	GK	SRB	Nenad Rajić (from (Bosnia and Herzegovina) Leotar)
3	DF	BIH	Senad Husić (from (Bosnia and Herzegovina) Zvijezda)
4	DF	HUN	Tamás Kádár (from (Netherlands) Roda)
5	DF	BRA	William Alves (from (Brazil) Tombense)
11	MF	SRB	Zoran Kostić (from (Kazakhstan) Zhetysu)
14	DF	HUN	András Debreceni (from Honvéd)
20	MF	HUN	Márk Nikházi (from MTK)
22	GK	CRO	Ivan Radoš (loan return from (Azerbaijan) Kapaz)
31	MF	HUN	Dávid Barczi (from Diósgyőr)
35	MF	BRA	Thiago Bonfim (from (Brazil) Bahia)
55	GK	HUN	Vince Gelei (from Csákvár)
88	FW	ECU	Augusto Batioja (from (Montenegro) Mladost)
91	MF	HUN	Péter Bogáti (loan return from Kazincbarcika)
99	FW	HUN	Márkó Futács (loan from (England) Leicester City)

Out: Note: Flags indicate national team as defined under FIFA eligibility rules; some limited exceptions apply. Players may hold more than one non-FIFA nationality.

No.	Pos.	Nation	Player
1	GK	HUN	Norbert Tajti (to Siófok)
4	DF	HUN	Tamás Kádár (loan return to (Netherlands) Roda)
7	MF	ESP	Francisco Gallardo (to Puskás)
12	GK	SVK	Ladislav Rybánsky (to (Poland) Bielsko-Biała)
14	DF	HUN	Tamás Nagy (to Pápa)
17	FW	HUN	Gergely Rudolf (to Győr)
20	MF	ESP	Fernando (end of career)
63	GK	HUN	Róbert Ambrusics
77	MF	ESP	José Luque (end of career)
88	FW	FRA	L´Imam Seydi (to Debrecen)
91	MF	HUN	Péter Bogáti (to Siófok)
98	MF	MAR	Youssef Sekour (to Pápa)

=== Ferencváros ===
In: Note: Flags indicate national team as defined under FIFA eligibility rules; some limited exceptions apply. Players may hold more than one non-FIFA nationality.

No.	Pos.	Nation	Player
1	GK	HUN	Péter Kurucz (from Siófok)
4	DF	HUN	Sándor Hidvégi (from MTK)
11	MF	NED	Arsenio Valpoort (from (Netherlands) Heerenveen)
11	FW	HUN	János Máté (loan return from Siófok)
14	FW	NED	Jack Tuyp (from (Netherlands) Volendam)
17	MF	HUN	Dominik Nagy (from Pécs)
17	FW	MLI	Ulysse Diallo (from (Lebanon) Al-Sahel)
20	FW	HUN	Pantelis Popgeorgiev (from Ferencváros II)
21	MF	HUN	Norbert Zsivóczky (loan return from Szigetszentmiklós)
22	MF	HUN	Attila Busai (loan return from Szolnok)
25	MF	HUN	Ákos Buzsáky (from (England) Portsmouth)
26	DF	HUN	Tamás Grúz (loan return from Szolnok)
35	DF	BRA	Gerson (loan from (Austria) Kapfenberg)
37	DF	HUN	János Birtalan (from Ferencváros II)
44	DF	ESP	David Mateos (from (Spain) Real Madrid B)
52	DF	TRI	Akeem Adams (from (Trinidad and Tobago) Central)
72	GK	HUN	Gábor Rigó (from Ferencváros II)

Out: Note: Flags indicate national team as defined under FIFA eligibility rules; some limited exceptions apply. Players may hold more than one non-FIFA nationality.

No.	Pos.	Nation	Player
1	GK	SVN	Marko Ranilović (to Kaposvár)
4	DF	HUN	Dániel Sváb (to (Germany) FC Energie Cottbus)
10	FW	SRB	Milan Perić (loan return to Videoton)
11	FW	HUN	János Máté (to Szolnok)
11	MF	BEL	Stanley Aborah
17	MF	HUN	Bence Batik (loan to MTK)
18	MF	HUN	András Gárdos (to Siófok)
21	MF	HUN	Norbert Zsivóczky (to Szigetszentmiklós)
23	DF	BRA	Júnior Fell
26	DF	HUN	Tamás Grúz (loan to Szolnok)
39	MF	HUN	Márk Orosz (loan to Pápa)
44	DF	CZE	Martin Klein
66	MF	SRB	Aleksandar Alempijević (to (Serbia) Javor)
77	MF	FIN	Juha Hakola (to (Finland) Kuopion)
91	FW	NED	Quenten Martinus (to (Netherlands) Emmen)

=== Győr ===
In: Note: Flags indicate national team as defined under FIFA eligibility rules; some limited exceptions apply. Players may hold more than one non-FIFA nationality.

No.	Pos.	Nation	Player
5	MF	CMR	Patrick Mevoungou (from (Austria) Admira Wacker)
7	FW	HUN	János Lázok (loan from Paks)
10	FW	ITA	Leandro Martínez (from Honvéd)
14	FW	HUN	Gergely Rudolf (from Diósgyőr)
14	MF	HUN	Máté Kiss (loan return from Siófok)
18	MF	HUN	József Windecker (loan return from Siófok)
19	FW	HUN	András Simon (loan return from Szombathely)
25	DF	JAM	Rafe Wolfe (from MTK)
26	DF	HUN	Bence Zámbó (loan return from Kaposvár)
30	FW	SLV	Rafael Burgos (loan from (El Salvador) Alianza)

Out: Note: Flags indicate national team as defined under FIFA eligibility rules; some limited exceptions apply. Players may hold more than one non-FIFA nationality.

No.	Pos.	Nation	Player
5	DF	SVK	Marián Had
10	FW	GEO	Rati Aleksidze (to (Georgia (country)) Dila Gori)
14	MF	HUN	Máté Kiss (loan to Mezőkövesd)
14	MF	LTU	Linas Pilibaitis (loan to Mezőkövesd)
18	MF	HUN	József Windecker (loan to Paks)
19	FW	HUN	András Simon (to Győr II)
22	DF	CRO	Valentin Babić (to (Croatia) Osijek)
25	FW	GEO	Giorgi Kvilitaia (to (Georgia (country)) Dila Gori)
25	FW	EST	Jarmo Ahjupera (to Újpest)
26	DF	HUN	Bence Zámbó (to Kaposvár)
27	GK	HUN	Péter Nacsa (loan to Kisvárda)
30	GK	SVK	Péter Molnár (to Paks)

=== Kaposvár ===
In: Note: Flags indicate national team as defined under FIFA eligibility rules; some limited exceptions apply. Players may hold more than one non-FIFA nationality.

No.	Pos.	Nation	Player
6	DF	ROU	Iulian Petrache (from (Romania) Bihor Oradea)
8	MF	CRO	Stjepan Babić (from (Croatia) Rudeš)
11	FW	ROU	Adrian Mărkuş (from (Romania) Bihor Oradea)
16	DF	BRA	Lucas (from Vasas)
19	MF	HUN	Ádám Albert (from Eger)
20	DF	HUN	Bence Zámbó (from Győr)
24	MF	ROU	Andrei Coroian (from (Romania) Bihor Oradea)
26	DF	HUN	Patrik Böjte (from Kaposvár II)
31	MF	CRO	Luka Dominic (from (Croatia) Prelog)
33	DF	HUN	Milán Földes (from Kaposvár II)
70	GK	SVN	Marko Ranilović (from Ferencváros)

Out: Note: Flags indicate national team as defined under FIFA eligibility rules; some limited exceptions apply. Players may hold more than one non-FIFA nationality.

No.	Pos.	Nation	Player
8	MF	CRO	Nikola Šafarić (to (Slovenia) Zavrč)
16	FW	GUI	Moustapha Diallo
20	DF	HUN	Bence Zámbó (loan return to Győr)
21	GK	SVK	Ľuboš Hajdúch (to Puskás)
29	DF	GRE	Lazaros Fotias (loan return to (Italy) Parma)
24	MF	HUN	Dávid Hegedűs (to Mezőkövesd)
33	MF	BRA	Pedro (to (Greece) Levadiakos)

=== Kecskemét ===
In: Note: Flags indicate national team as defined under FIFA eligibility rules; some limited exceptions apply. Players may hold more than one non-FIFA nationality.

No.	Pos.	Nation	Player
5	MF	HUN	István Farkas (loan return from Cegléd)
9	FW	GUI	Ousmane Barry (from (Estonia) Tartu)
11	MF	BRA	Eliomar (loan from (Serbia) Partizan)
12	GK	HUN	Viktor Németh (from Budaörs)
15	DF	HUN	Attila Gyagya (loan return from Szolnok)
20	FW	BEN	Sidoine Oussou (loan from (Norway) Vålerenga)
21	DF	HUN	Martin Ludasi (from Kecskemét II)
26	MF	HUN	Dárius Csillag (from Honvéd Academy)
30	MF	MNE	Boris Bulajić (from (Montenegro) Čelik Nikšić)
31	DF	SRB	Dejan Karan (from (Serbia) Vojvodina)
33	GK	HUN	Róbert Csala (from Kecskemét Academy)
37	MF	HUN	Dániel Nagy (from Kecskemét II)
83	GK	HUN	Csaba Borszéki (loan return from Vác)
88	DF	HUN	Viktor Tölgyesi (loan return from Gyirmót)
89	FW	HUN	Béni Faragó (from Kecskemét Academy)
92	DF	HUN	András Farkas (loan return from Baja)
95	GK	HUN	Konrád Verebélyi (from Honvéd Academy)
—	MF	SRB	Milan Cokić (loan return from Baja)

Out: Note: Flags indicate national team as defined under FIFA eligibility rules; some limited exceptions apply. Players may hold more than one non-FIFA nationality.

No.	Pos.	Nation	Player
5	MF	HUN	István Farkas (to Cegléd)
9	FW	HUN	Ádám Kovács (loan return to Nyíregyháza)
11	MF	HUN	Márkó Sós (to Gyirmót)
18	MF	HUN	Attila Hullám (to Paks)
20	MF	GEO	Givi Ioseliani (to (Georgia (country)) Bolnisi)
21	FW	SLV	Rafael Burgos (loan return to (Austria) Ried)
22	DF	HUN	Dávid Mohl (to Pécs)
26	MF	HUN	Lajos Bertus (to Puskás)
27	MF	CMR	Mbengono Yannick (to (Thailand) Chainat)
28	DF	HUN	Tamás Vaskó (loan return to Videoton)
30	FW	NGA	Eugène Salami (loan return to Debrecen)
33	GK	HUN	Gábor Ikotin
83	GK	HUN	Csaba Borszéki
88	DF	HUN	Viktor Tölgyesi (loan to Békéscsaba)
92	MF	ARG	Edgardo Díaz
—	MF	SRB	Milan Cokić

=== Lombard-Pápa ===
In: Note: Flags indicate national team as defined under FIFA eligibility rules; some limited exceptions apply. Players may hold more than one non-FIFA nationality.

No.	Pos.	Nation	Player
6	DF	MKD	Jasmin Mecinović (from Eger)
6	FW	SEN	Mouhamadou Seye (loan return from Zalaegerszeg)
7	FW	HUN	István Eszlátyi (from BKV Előre)
8	DF	HUN	Tamás Nagy (from Diósgyőr)
10	FW	HUN	Gergő Lovrencsics (loan return from (Poland) Lech Poznań)
11	MF	HUN	Márk Orosz (loan from Ferencváros)
12	DF	BIH	Zoran Šupić (from (Romania) UTA Arad)
13	DF	SVK	Peter Struhár (from (Slovakia) Nitra)
13	MF	HUN	Electo Wilson (loan return from BKV Előre)
19	FW	HUN	Krisztián Kenesei (from Szombathely)
22	MF	SRB	Novica Maksimović (from (Serbia) Novi Sad)
23	GK	HUN	Gábor Horváth (from BKV Előre)
40	MF	HUN	Gellért Ivancsics (from Budapest Honvéd)
50	FW	CIV	Georges Griffiths (from (Ivory Coast) Sirocco)
98	MF	MAR	Youssef Sekour (from Diósgyőr)

Out: Note: Flags indicate national team as defined under FIFA eligibility rules; some limited exceptions apply. Players may hold more than one non-FIFA nationality.

No.	Pos.	Nation	Player
3	DF	ESP	Daniel Orozco
6	FW	SEN	Mouhamadou Seye
7	FW	HUN	Máté Szolga
10	FW	HUN	Gergő Lovrencsics (to (Poland) Lech Poznań)
11	FW	HUN	Gergő Beliczky (loan to Gyirmót)
13	MF	HUN	Electo Wilson (to Dabas)
17	FW	CRO	Tino Lagator (to (Croatia) Solin)
23	MF	BIH	Mahir Jasarević (loan return to Zalaegerszeg)
45	GK	HUN	Péter Nacsa (loan return to Győr)
50	FW	CIV	Georges Griffiths (loan return to (Ivory Coast) Sirocco)

=== Mezőkövesd ===
In: Note: Flags indicate national team as defined under FIFA eligibility rules; some limited exceptions apply. Players may hold more than one non-FIFA nationality.

No.	Pos.	Nation	Player
5	DF	HUN	Zsolt Gévay (from Gyirmót)
11	FW	HUN	Ádám Balajti (loan from Debrecen)
15	MF	HUN	Zoltán Búrány (from Szombathely)
24	MF	HUN	Dávid Hegedűs (from Kaposvár)
29	FW	SVK	Zoltán Harsányi (from (Slovakia) Myjava)
31	GK	HUN	Tamás Horváth (from Újpest)
33	MF	HUN	Vilmos Melczer (from Siófok)
38	DF	SVK	Dominik Fótyik (from (Slovakia) Žilina)
66	MF	HUN	Máté Kiss (loan from Győr)
77	MF	LTU	Linas Pilibaitis (loan from Győr)
—	FW	HUN	Attila Bene (loan return from Putnok)
—	FW	HUN	Viktor Szabó (loan return from BKV Előre)

Out: Note: Flags indicate national team as defined under FIFA eligibility rules; some limited exceptions apply. Players may hold more than one non-FIFA nationality.

No.	Pos.	Nation	Player
5	DF	HUN	Balázs Bényei (loan return to Debrecen II)
7	FW	HUN	Tamás Kemény
15	DF	HUN	Péter Nagy
19	MF	HUN	Norbert Lipusz (to Cegléd)
30	DF	HUN	Norbert Kardos (loan return to Gyirmót)
—	FW	HUN	Attila Bene
—	FW	HUN	Viktor Szabó (to Kazincbarcika)
—	FW	HUN	János Farkas

=== MTK Budapest ===
In: Note: Flags indicate national team as defined under FIFA eligibility rules; some limited exceptions apply. Players may hold more than one non-FIFA nationality.

No.	Pos.	Nation	Player
7	MF	HUN	Zsolt Horváth (from Pécs)
14	DF	HUN	András Fejes (loan from Videoton II)
23	MF	HUN	Szabolcs Varga (from MTK Academy)
25	MF	ESP	Ayub (from (Spain) Mataró)
27	MF	HUN	Bence Batik (loan from Ferencváros)
29	GK	HUN	Attila Abu (from MTK II)
32	FW	HUN	Richárd Frank (loan return from Tatabánya)
39	FW	HUN	Péter Horváth (from MTK II)
45	FW	HUN	Márton Eppel (loan from Paks)
—	DF	HUN	Bence Deutsch (from MTK Academy)
—	MF	SRB	Đorđe Đurić (loan return from Tatabánya)

Out: Note: Flags indicate national team as defined under FIFA eligibility rules; some limited exceptions apply. Players may hold more than one non-FIFA nationality.

No.	Pos.	Nation	Player
4	DF	HUN	Sándor Hidvégi (to Ferencváros)
7	MF	HUN	László Zsidai (to Debrecen)
9	FW	HUN	András Pál
20	FW	HUN	Ferenc Rácz (loan to Pécs)
23	DF	HUN	Dániel Vadnai (to Debrecen)
25	MF	HUN	Márk Nikházi (to Diósgyőr)
30	FW	HUN	Patrik Tischler (to Puskás)
39	DF	JAM	Rafe Wolfe (to Győr)
91	FW	HUN	Ádám Balajti (loan return to Debrecen)
—	DF	HUN	Bence Deutsch (loan to Pécs)
—	MF	SRB	Đorđe Đurić

=== Paks ===
In: Note: Flags indicate national team as defined under FIFA eligibility rules; some limited exceptions apply. Players may hold more than one non-FIFA nationality.

No.	Pos.	Nation	Player
1	GK	SVK	Péter Molnár (from Győr)
2	FW	HUN	István Nagy (loan return from Szolnok)
8	MF	HUN	Tamás Kecskés (from Siófok)
9	FW	HUN	Attila Simon (loan return from Pécs)
11	DF	HUN	Tibor Nyári (from Siófok)
14	FW	HUN	Szabolcs Csorba (from Nyíregyháza)
17	MF	HUN	Attila Hullám (from Kecskemét)
22	MF	HUN	József Windecker (loan from Győr)
23	MF	HUN	Olivér Nagy (from Pécs)
29	MF	HUN	Gábor Tamási (loan return from Szolnok)
33	DF	HUN	Gábor Horváth (from (Netherlands) Den Haag)
54	GK	HUN	Roland Máté (from Paks Academy)
87	FW	HUN	Gergely Délczeg (loan from Honvéd)
87	FW	HUN	Barnabás Vári (loan return from Szolnok)
—	FW	HUN	Dániel Tóth (from Orosháza)
—	MF	HUN	Roland Bohner (loan return from Szolnok)

Out: Note: Flags indicate national team as defined under FIFA eligibility rules; some limited exceptions apply. Players may hold more than one non-FIFA nationality.

No.	Pos.	Nation	Player
1	GK	HUN	Gábor Németh (to Vasas)
2	FW	HUN	István Nagy (loan to Szolnok)
6	DF	HUN	Tamás Sifter (to Sopron)
11	MF	HUN	Gábor Vayer (to Zalaegerszeg)
20	FW	HUN	János Lázok (loan to Győr)
23	GK	HUN	Máté Kiss (to Siófok)
25	FW	HUN	Márton Eppel (loan to MTK)
29	MF	HUN	Gábor Tamási (to Bölcske)
33	DF	HUN	József Zsók (loan to Baja)
87	FW	HUN	Barnabás Vári (loan to Szolnok)
89	FW	HUN	Roland Pap (to Kozármisleny)
92	MF	HUN	Norbert Pintér (to Balmazújváros)
95	FW	HUN	János Hahn (to Felcsút)
—	MF	HUN	Roland Bohner (loan to Szolnok)
—	FW	HUN	Dániel Tóth (loan to Balmazújváros)

=== Pécs ===
In: Note: Flags indicate national team as defined under FIFA eligibility rules; some limited exceptions apply. Players may hold more than one non-FIFA nationality.

No.	Pos.	Nation	Player
1	GK	HUN	Gergő Gőcze (from Szombathely)
3	DF	HUN	Bence Deutsch (loan from MTK)
4	DF	HUN	József Nagy (loan return from Kozármisleny)
10	DF	HUN	Roland Frőhlich (loan return from Kozármisleny)
13	MF	SRB	Đorđe Jočić (from (Serbia) Radnički Sombor)
14	MF	HUN	Dominik Nagy (loan return from Kozármisleny)
20	MF	HUN	Viktor Városi (loan return from Kozármisleny)
21	DF	CRO	Danijel Romić (from Kozármisleny)
22	DF	HUN	Dávid Mohl (from Kecskemét)
25	MF	HUN	Ferenc Rácz (loan from MTK)
27	MF	HUN	Róbert Kővári (from Pécs Academy)
31	GK	HUN	Bence Steer (from Rákospalota)
60	FW	HUN	Péter Pölöskey (loan from Debrecen)

Out: Note: Flags indicate national team as defined under FIFA eligibility rules; some limited exceptions apply. Players may hold more than one non-FIFA nationality.

No.	Pos.	Nation	Player
1	GK	HUN	Péter Molnár (loan to Kozármisleny)
10	MF	HUN	Olivér Nagy (to Paks)
14	MF	HUN	Dominik Nagy (to Ferencváros)
16	GK	HUN	András Sánta (to Szigetszentmiklós)
20	DF	HUN	Pál Lázár (to Debrecen)
20	FW	NGA	Solomon Okoronkwo (to (Germany) Ezgebirge Aue)
25	DF	CZE	Jiří Krejčí (to (Czech Republic) Vysočina Jihlava)
26	DF	CRO	Andrej Čaušić
28	DF	CIV	Jean-Baptiste Akassou (to (Greece) Niki Volos)
69	FW	HUN	Zsolt Horváth (to MTK)
99	FW	HUN	Attila Simon (loan return to Paks)

=== Puskás ===
In: Note: Flags indicate national team as defined under FIFA eligibility rules; some limited exceptions apply. Players may hold more than one non-FIFA nationality.

No.	Pos.	Nation	Player
4	DF	HUN	Márk Tamás (from Videoton II)
7	DF	GRE	Vassilios Apostolopoulos (loan from Videoton)
9	FW	HUN	Patrik Tischler (from MTK)
10	MF	SRB	Uroš Nikolić (loan from Videoton)
11	MF	HUN	Márk Barcsay (from Videoton Academy)
20	MF	HUN	Bálint Károly (from Videoton II)
21	GK	SVK	Ľuboš Hajdúch (from Kaposvár)
24	DF	HUN	Csaba Vachtler (from Videoton II)
26	MF	HUN	Lajos Bertus (from Kecskemét)
29	FW	HUN	László Lencse (loan from Videoton)
35	MF	HUN	Tibor Molnár (from Videoton II)
41	GK	HUN	Marcell Papp (from Videoton II)
71	MF	ESP	Francisco Gallardo (from Diósgyőr)
77	MF	HUN	Péter Czvitkovics (from Debrecen)
77	MF	HUN	László Tóth (from Felcsút)
80	FW	HUN	Zsolt Haraszti (loan from Videoton)
88	MF	HUN	Dénes Szakály (loan from Videoton)
89	DF	HUN	Adrián Szekeres (loan from Videoton)
90	DF	FRA	Mamadou Wague (from Debrecen)
95	MF	HUN	Donát Szelei (from Felcsút)

Out: Note: Flags indicate national team as defined under FIFA eligibility rules; some limited exceptions apply. Players may hold more than one non-FIFA nationality.

No.	Pos.	Nation	Player
4	DF	HUN	Szilárd Papp (to Siófok)
5	MF	HUN	János Soós (to Békéscsaba)
6	FW	HUN	Gáspár Orbán (to Videoton II)
7	DF	GRE	Vassilios Apostolopoulos (loan return to Videoton)
10	MF	HUN	László Kleinheisler (to Videoton)
11	MF	NGA	Moris Enete (to Videoton)
16	MF	HUN	Dániel Nagy (loan return to Videoton)
23	GK	HUN	Zoltán Czirjék (to Zalaegerszeg)
29	MF	HUN	Zsolt Nagy (loan return to Videoton II)
88	MF	HUN	Dénes Szakály (loan return to Videoton)

=== Szombathely ===
In: Note: Flags indicate national team as defined under FIFA eligibility rules; some limited exceptions apply. Players may hold more than one non-FIFA nationality.

No.	Pos.	Nation	Player
1	GK	HUN	Dávid Dombó (from Szombathely II)
16	FW	HUN	Máté Skriba (loan return from Tatabánya)
35	DF	SRB	Predrag Bošnjak (from Veszprém)
46	MF	HUN	Ádám Simon (loan from (Italy) Palermo)
77	FW	HUN	Zoltán Medgyes (from Szombathely II)

Out: Note: Flags indicate national team as defined under FIFA eligibility rules; some limited exceptions apply. Players may hold more than one non-FIFA nationality.

No.	Pos.	Nation	Player
2	MF	HUN	Zoltán Búrány (to Mezőkövesd)
10	MF	HUN	Kornél Kulcsár (loan to Zalaegerszeg)
11	FW	HUN	András Simon (loan return to Győr)
16	FW	HUN	Máté Skriba (loan to Ajka)
19	MF	HUN	Máté Hanzl (loan to Ajka)
20	FW	HUN	Krisztián Kenesei (to Pápa)
26	DF	HUN	Márk Jagodics (loan to Ajka)
30	GK	HUN	Gergő Gőcze (to Pécs)
33	DF	HUN	Márk Farkas (loan to Gyirmót)
46	MF	HUN	Ádám Simon (loan return to (Italy) Palermo)

=== Újpest ===
In: Note: Flags indicate national team as defined under FIFA eligibility rules; some limited exceptions apply. Players may hold more than one non-FIFA nationality.

No.	Pos.	Nation	Player
2	DF	FRA	Loïc Nego (from (Italy) Roma)
2	DF	HUN	János Nagy (from Újpest II)
5	DF	ESP	Juanan (from (Germany) Fortuna Düsseldorf)
10	MF	HUN	Dávid Barczi (loan return from (Belgium) St. Truidense)
11	FW	EST	Jarmo Ahjupera (from Győr)
13	MF	KEN	Hisham Said (from Újpest II)
14	MF	HUN	Rajmond Toricska (from Újpest II)
18	MF	MNE	Bojan Sanković (from (Montenegro) Mladost)
24	DF	BEL	Simon Ligot (loan from Standard Liège)
27	DF	HUN	Sándor Molnár (from Újpest II)
28	DF	HUN	Ronald Erős (from Újpest II)
32	MF	HUN	Tamás Egerszegi (loan return from (Belgium) St. Truidense)
36	GK	SRB	Marko Dmitrović (from (Serbia) Crvena Zvezda)
55	DF	BEL	Pierre-Yves Ngawa (loan from (Belgium) Standard Liège)
99	MF	BIH	Asmir Suljić (from (Bosnia and Herzegovina) Sarajevo)

Out: Note: Flags indicate national team as defined under FIFA eligibility rules; some limited exceptions apply. Players may hold more than one non-FIFA nationality.

No.	Pos.	Nation	Player
2	DF	HUN	Marcell Fodor (loan to Ajka)
2	DF	HUN	János Nagy (loan to Szigetszentmiklós)
5	DF	ITA	Alessandro Iandoli (loan return to (Belgium) St. Truiden)
10	MF	HUN	Dávid Barczi (to Diósgyőr)
21	MF	HUN	Mohamed Remili (to Vasas)
24	DF	HUN	Zoltán Pollák (to Szigetszentmiklós)
26	DF	HUN	Zsolt Szokol (to Nyíregyháza)
27	MF	HUN	Dániel Kovács (to Gyirmót)
32	MF	HUN	Tamás Egerszegi (loan to Gyirmót)
34	DF	BEL	Naïm Aarab (loan to (Belgium) St. Truiden)
36	GK	HUN	Tamás Horváth (to Mezőkövesd)
40	GK	HUN	Tamás Floszmann

=== Videoton ===
In: Note: Flags indicate national team as defined under FIFA eligibility rules; some limited exceptions apply. Players may hold more than one non-FIFA nationality.

No.	Pos.	Nation	Player
1	GK	ESP	Juan Calatayud (from (Spain) Mallorca)
5	MF	POR	Vítor Gomes (from (Portugal) Rio Ave)
5	DF	GRE	Vassilios Apostolopoulos (loan return from Puskás)
6	MF	BRA	Nildo Petrolina (from (Portugal) Beira-Mar)
7	MF	HUN	Dénes Szakály (loan return from Puskás)
8	MF	HUN	László Kleinheisler (from Puskás)
8	FW	SRB	Milan Perić (loan return from Ferencváros)
9	FW	POR	Evandro Brandão (loan return from (Portugal) Olhanense)
11	MF	HUN	György Sándor (loan return from (Saudi Arabia) Al-Ittihad)
18	MF	HUN	Máté Papp (from Videoton II)
19	FW	HUN	László Lencse (loan return from (Greece) Asteras Tripolis)
22	MF	HUN	Dániel Nagy (loan return from Puskás)
23	FW	SLV	Arturo Alvarez (from (Portugal) Paços de Ferreira)
23	DF	HUN	Tamás Vaskó (loan return from Kecskemét)
24	DF	GNB	Mamadu Candé (from (Portugal) Aves)
29	FW	CPV	Zé Luís (loan from (Portugal) Braga)
29	MF	NGA	Moris Enete (from Puskás)
32	DF	HUN	Roland Juhász (from (Belgium) Anderlecht)
66	DF	HUN	Gábor Gyepes (from (England) Portsmouth)

Out: Note: Flags indicate national team as defined under FIFA eligibility rules; some limited exceptions apply. Players may hold more than one non-FIFA nationality.

No.	Pos.	Nation	Player
5	DF	GRE	Vassilios Apostolopoulos (loan to Puskás)
5	MF	POR	Vítor Gomes (loan return to (Portugal) Rio Ave)
7	MF	HUN	Dénes Szakály (loan to Puskás)
8	FW	SRB	Milan Perić (to Videoton II)
9	MF	POR	Evandro Brandão (to (Portugal) Tondela)
14	MF	SRB	Nikola Mitrović (to (Israel) Maccabi Tel Aviv)
18	MF	HUN	Máté Papp (loan to Dunaújváros)
19	FW	HUN	László Lencse (loan to Puskás)
21	DF	HUN	Adrián Szekeres (loan to Puskás)
22	MF	HUN	Dániel Nagy (to Siófok)
23	DF	BRA	Kaká (to (Spain) Deportivo)
23	DF	HUN	Tamás Vaskó (to Videoton II)
23	FW	SLV	Arturo Alvarez (loan return to (Portugal) Paços de Ferreira)
24	DF	ESP	Héctor Sánchez
27	GK	MNE	Mladen Božović (to (Russia) Tom Tomsk)
32	DF	HUN	Roland Juhász (loan return to (Belgium) Anderlecht)
88	MF	HUN	Zsolt Haraszti (loan to Puskás)
99	MF	SRB	Uroš Nikolić (loan to Puskás)

== Ness Liga ==
=== Ajka ===
In: Note: Flags indicate national team as defined under FIFA eligibility rules; some limited exceptions apply. Players may hold more than one non-FIFA nationality.

No.	Pos.	Nation	Player
4	DF	HUN	Marcell Fodor (loan from Újpest)
5	DF	HUN	Márk Jagodics (loan from Szombathely)
8	MF	HUN	Attila Horváth (from Siófok)
9	DF	HUN	Máté Hanzl (loan from Szombathely)
10	MF	HUN	Norbert Lattenstein (from Budaörs)
12	FW	HUN	Bence Meiczinger (from Veszprém Academy)
15	DF	HUN	János Köles (from Győr II)
16	MF	HUN	Máté Skriba (loan from Szombathely)
22	MF	HUN	Tamás Varga (from Győr II)
30	GK	HUN	Ákos Tulipán (from Baja)

Out: Note: Flags indicate national team as defined under FIFA eligibility rules; some limited exceptions apply. Players may hold more than one non-FIFA nationality.

No.	Pos.	Nation	Player
4	DF	HUN	Zsolt Kovács (to Répcelak)
5	DF	HUN	Gábor Subicz (to (Austria) Deutschkreutz)
7	MF	HUN	Levente Szabó (to Mosonmagyaróvár)
8	MF	HUN	Attila Horváth (loan return to Siófok)
9	FW	HUN	Roland Szalai (loan return to Szombathely Academy)
11	DF	HUN	Szabolcs Kovács (to Balatonfüred)
12	FW	HUN	Balázs Pavlitzky (to Veszprém)
15	DF	HUN	Márk Sallér
17	MF	SVK	Károly Czanik
18	MF	HUN	Péter Szabó (to Rákosmente)
22	MF	HUN	Bálint Nagy (loan return to Szombathely II)
33	GK	HUN	Tamás Szép (to (Austria) Hof am Leithaberge)

=== Balmazújváros ===
In: Note: Flags indicate national team as defined under FIFA eligibility rules; some limited exceptions apply. Players may hold more than one non-FIFA nationality.

No.	Pos.	Nation	Player
12	GK	HUN	Dániel Tóth (from Létavértes)
19	DF	HUN	Gergő Oláh (from Debrecen II)
21	FW	HUN	Dániel Tóth (loan from Paks)
23	MF	HUN	Zsolt Müller (from (Austria) St.Peter\Au)
32	MF	HUN	József Patalenszki (from Debrecen Academy)
92	MF	HUN	Norbert Pintér (from Paks)
99	FW	HUN	Péter Karacs (loan from Honvéd Academy)

Out: Note: Flags indicate national team as defined under FIFA eligibility rules; some limited exceptions apply. Players may hold more than one non-FIFA nationality.

No.	Pos.	Nation	Player
11	MF	HUN	István Sándor (to Nyíregyháza)
15	MF	HUN	Gergő Rása
18	MF	HUN	Máté Gulyás
34	MF	HUN	Tamás Arnóczki (to Hajdúböszörmény)
92	FW	HUN	István Csobán
99	MF	HUN	István Ludánszki (to Tatabánya)

=== Békéscsaba ===
In: Note: Flags indicate national team as defined under FIFA eligibility rules; some limited exceptions apply. Players may hold more than one non-FIFA nationality.

No.	Pos.	Nation	Player
2	DF	HUN	Dániel Kiprich (from Kazicnbarcika)
5	DF	SVK	Dávid Radványi (from Veszprém)
6	FW	HUN	József Balázs (loan return from Orosháza)
7	MF	BRA	Lucas (loan from Debrecen)
11	DF	HUN	Zsolt Balog (from Eger)
12	GK	HUN	Antal Bozsó (loan return from Gyula)
13	FW	ROU	Adrian Voiculeț (from (Romania) UTA Arad)
14	MF	HUN	Viktor Tölgyesi (loan from Kecskemét)
15	MF	HUN	János Soós (from Puskás)
16	MF	HUN	Milán Balogh (from Békéscsaba Academy)
17	DF	HUN	Zsolt Makra (loan return from Orosháza)
18	MF	HUN	Patrik Király (from Videoton II)
20	FW	SRB	Nikola Pantović (loan from Honvéd Academy)
21	DF	HUN	Miklós Balogh (loan return from Szigetszentmiklós)
23	DF	HUN	István Szűcs (loan from Debrecen)
24	FW	HUN	Ádám Viczián (from Békéscsaba Academy)
25	DF	HUN	István Albert (loan from Debrecen II)
90	GK	HUN	Dániel Póser (from Kazicnbarcika)
—	MF	SRB	Novica Petrović (from (Serbia) Srem)

Out: Note: Flags indicate national team as defined under FIFA eligibility rules; some limited exceptions apply. Players may hold more than one non-FIFA nationality.

No.	Pos.	Nation	Player
2	MF	HUN	Árpád Majoros
5	DF	HUN	Máté Ferenczi (to Orosháza)
5	DF	COL	Mario Llanos (loan return to (Colombia) Deportivo Pereira)
6	FW	HUN	József Balázs
7	MF	NGA	Samuel Obot
11	DF	ROU	Sorin Răducu
12	GK	HUN	Antal Bozsó (to BKV Előre)
12	GK	HUN	Gábor Máthé
14	MF	HUN	Dániel Kákonyi (to Nyíregyháza)
14	FW	ROU	Adrian Hadar (loan return to (Romania) Bihor Oradea)
15	DF	HUN	Gergő Huszár (to Orosháza)
15	FW	HUN	Patrik Király (loan return to Videoton II)
16	MF	HUN	Zsolt Sztrunga (to Pénzügyőr)
16	DF	HUN	Dániel Lengyel (to Gyirmót)
17	DF	HUN	Zsolt Makra (to Orosháza)
18	MF	HUN	Krisztián Sipos
19	MF	SRB	Aleksandar Ranđelović (to (Hong Kong) Sun Pegasus)
21	DF	HUN	Miklós Balogh (to Szigetszentmiklós)
23	DF	ROU	Sorin Botis (to (Romania) Atletico Arad)
25	MF	ROU	Norbert Varga (to (Romania) Atletico Arad)

=== Cegléd ===
In: Note: Flags indicate national team as defined under FIFA eligibility rules; some limited exceptions apply. Players may hold more than one non-FIFA nationality.

No.	Pos.	Nation	Player
1	GK	HUN	Attila Kovács (from Veszprém)
3	DF	HUN	Dávid Pesti (from Kecskemét Academy)
4	DF	HUN	Máté Oláh (from Ferencváros II)
5	DF	HUN	István Farkas (from Kecskemét)
6	MF	HUN	Balázs Fehér (from Kazincbarcika)
8	MF	HUN	Norbert Lipusz (from Mezőkövesd)
9	FW	HUN	Gábor Koós (from Eger)
17	DF	HUN	Ákos Szala (from Kazincbarcika)

Out: Note: Flags indicate national team as defined under FIFA eligibility rules; some limited exceptions apply. Players may hold more than one non-FIFA nationality.

No.	Pos.	Nation	Player
2	FW	HUN	Csongor Bata
3	DF	HUN	Zoltán Vincze
4	FW	HUN	Marcell Balog (to Kiskunfélegyháza)
5	DF	HUN	István Farkas (loan return to Kecskemét)
6	DF	HUN	Krisztián Ladiszlai
8	MF	HUN	Lajos Nagy (end of career)
9	MF	HUN	Tamás Kiss (to Siófok)
10	MF	SRB	Vladan Brdarić
12	GK	HUN	Tamás Balogh (to Jászapáti)
13	MF	HUN	Ádám Csurka (to Nagykőrös)
17	MF	HUN	Botond Szalai

=== Dunaújváros ===
In: Note: Flags indicate national team as defined under FIFA eligibility rules; some limited exceptions apply. Players may hold more than one non-FIFA nationality.

No.	Pos.	Nation	Player
5	DF	HUN	Barna Burucz (from Csákvár)
8	FW	HUN	Gábor Urbán (from Szigetszentmiklós)
12	MF	HUN	Máté Papp (loan from Videoton)
15	MF	HUN	Botond Birtalan (Kozármisleny)
16	MF	BRA	Thiago (from Veszprém)

Out: Note: Flags indicate national team as defined under FIFA eligibility rules; some limited exceptions apply. Players may hold more than one non-FIFA nationality.

No.	Pos.	Nation	Player
3	DF	HUN	Miklós Salamon (to Dunaújváros II)
5	DF	HUN	Zoltán Csiszár (to Rákosmente)
11	MF	HUN	Dénes Márki (to Bölcske)
12	FW	HUN	Norbert Kerek (to (Austria) Melk)
15	MF	HUN	Gergő Kocsis (to Balatonfüred)
16	MF	HUN	Péter Hosszú
21	DF	HUN	Dániel Köntös (to Dunaújváros II)

=== Gyirmót ===
In: Note: Flags indicate national team as defined under FIFA eligibility rules; some limited exceptions apply. Players may hold more than one non-FIFA nationality.

No.	Pos.	Nation	Player
3	DF	HUN	Márk Farkas (loan from Szombathely)
5	DF	HUN	János Fejes (loan from Honvéd II)
6	DF	HUN	Norbert Kardos (loan return from Mezőkövesd)
7	FW	HUN	Gergő Beliczky (loan from Pápa)
10	MF	HUN	Rudolf Horváth (loan return from Mosonmagyaróvár)
17	FW	HUN	Patrik Kelemen (from Létavértes)
22	MF	HUN	Tamás Egerszegi (loan from Újpest)
22	FW	HUN	László Nagy (loan return from Mosonmagyaróvár)
23	DF	HUN	Dániel Lengyel (from Békéscsaba)
28	DF	HUN	Károly Graszl (from (Cyprus) Nea Salamis)
77	MF	HUN	Kristóf Papp (from Vác)
85	DF	HUN	Márkó Sós (from Kecskemét)
—	MF	HUN	Dániel Kovács (from Újpest)

Out: Note: Flags indicate national team as defined under FIFA eligibility rules; some limited exceptions apply. Players may hold more than one non-FIFA nationality.

No.	Pos.	Nation	Player
3	DF	HUN	Gábor Nagy (to Vasas)
5	DF	HUN	Zsolt Gévay (to Mezőkövesd)
6	MF	HUN	Viktor Tölgyesi (loan return to Kecskemét)
7	MF	HUN	Balázs Molnár (end of career)
10	MF	HUN	Rudolf Horváth (to Mosonmagyaróvár)
16	DF	HUN	Csaba Szabó (to Győrszemere)
17	MF	HUN	László Varga (to Siófok)
17	MF	HUN	Csaba Regedei
22	MF	HUN	Tamás Egerszegi (loan return to Újpest)
22	FW	HUN	László Nagy (to Győrszemere)

=== Kozármisleny ===
In: Note: Flags indicate national team as defined under FIFA eligibility rules; some limited exceptions apply. Players may hold more than one non-FIFA nationality.

No.	Pos.	Nation	Player
1	GK	HUN	Péter Molnár (loan from Pécs)
7	MF	HUN	Krisztián Nagy (from Honvéd II)
9	FW	HUN	Bence Varga (from Szeged)
14	MF	HUN	István Vituska (from (Austria) Gunskirchen)
20	MF	HUN	Zoltán Farkas (from Szeged)
21	MF	HUN	Milán Bozsovics (from Pécs Academy)
28	MF	HUN	Erik Nagy (from Ferencváros Academy)
33	DF	HUN	Balázs Vattai (from Ferencváros II)
58	MF	HUN	Dániel Kovács (from Vasas)
68	MF	HUN	Attila Cziráki (from Paks II)
88	FW	HUN	Tamás Turi (from Pécs)
—	FW	HUN	Roland Pap (from Paks)

Out: Note: Flags indicate national team as defined under FIFA eligibility rules; some limited exceptions apply. Players may hold more than one non-FIFA nationality.

No.	Pos.	Nation	Player
1	GK	HUN	Gergő Volcsányi (loan to PVSK)
4	DF	CRO	Danijel Romić (to Pécs)
6	MF	HUN	Botond Birtalan (to Dunaújváros)
7	MF	HUN	József Boda (to Vasas)
9	MF	HUN	Viktor Városi (loan return to Pécs)
10	FW	HUN	Roland Frőhlich (loan return to Pécs)
11	FW	HUN	Zsolt Schmidt (loan to Szekszárd)
12	MF	CRO	Marko Bjelanović
14	MF	HUN	Dominik Nagy (loan return to Pécs)
16	MF	HUN	Valentin Berdó
18	MF	HUN	Roland Karacs (to BKV Előre)
19	DF	HUN	József Nagy (loan return to Pécs)
20	MF	HUN	Csaba Erőss (loan return to Pécs II)

=== Nyíregyháza ===
In: Note: Flags indicate national team as defined under FIFA eligibility rules; some limited exceptions apply. Players may hold more than one non-FIFA nationality.

No.	Pos.	Nation	Player
7	MF	HUN	Tamás Huszák (from Debrecen II)
10	FW	HUN	Péter Szilágyi (from Vasas)
11	MF	HUN	Ádám Kovács (loan return from Kecskemét)
13	DF	HUN	Tamás Rubus (from Újpest)
14	MF	HUN	Szabolcs Csordás (from Zalaegerszeg)
17	MF	HUN	Dániel Kákonyi (from Békéscsaba)
21	DF	HUN	Zsolt Szokol (from Újpest)
22	DF	HUN	Gábor Polényi (from Vasas)
24	MF	HUN	Roland Paku (from Győr II)
26	DF	HUN	Gergő Gengeliczki (from Honvéd II)
29	MF	HUN	István Sándor (from Balmazújváros)
66	GK	HUN	Tibor Sánta (loan return from Cigánd)
85	DF	HUN	Tamás Törtei (from Tatabánya)
87	MF	HUN	Ádám Farkas (from Eger)

Out: Note: Flags indicate national team as defined under FIFA eligibility rules; some limited exceptions apply. Players may hold more than one non-FIFA nationality.

No.	Pos.	Nation	Player
1	GK	HUN	Alex Hrabina (loan to Budaörs)
4	DF	HUN	Árpád Ambrusz (to Nyírbátor)
10	FW	HUN	Tamás Germán (to Szeged)
10	MF	HUN	Zsolt Bárányos (to Budaörs)
11	MF	HUN	Ádám Kovács (loan to Nyírbátor)
12	MF	SRB	Milan Davidov
13	DF	MNE	Nenad Đurović (to (Montenegro) Sutjeska Nikšić)
14	FW	SRB	Milan Nikolić
15	DF	HUN	László Ur (to Cigánd)
20	MF	SRB	Nikon Jevtić (to (Serbia) Petrovac na Mlavi)
21	MF	HUN	Krisztián Szilágyi (to Nyírbátor)
22	DF	HUN	László Bodnár
34	DF	HUN	Attila Farkas
37	MF	HUN	Krisztián Varga (to Cigánd)
66	GK	HUN	Tibor Sánta (to Cigánd)
99	FW	HUN	Szabolcs Csorba (to Paks)

=== Siófok ===
In: Note: Flags indicate national team as defined under FIFA eligibility rules; some limited exceptions apply. Players may hold more than one non-FIFA nationality.

No.	Pos.	Nation	Player
1	GK	HUN	Norbert Tajti (from Diósgyőr)
5	MF	HUN	Zsombor Futó (from Honvéd II)
6	MF	HUN	Mihály Mosberger (from Veszprém)
8	MF	HUN	Viktor Peszmeg (from Ferencváros II)
10	MF	HUN	Péter Bogáti (from Diósgyőr)
11	MF	HUN	András Gárdos (from Ferencváros)
12	GK	HUN	Máté Kiss (from Paks)
13	DF	HUN	Szilárd Papp (from Puskás)
15	MF	HUN	Dániel Nagy (from Videoton)
16	FW	HUN	Roland Vólent (from Honvéd II)
17	MF	HUN	Máté Vass (from Ferencváros II)
18	FW	HUN	Tamás Szöllősi (from Baja)
20	MF	HUN	Máté Papp (from Ferencváros II)
29	DF	HUN	Alexisz Novák (from Honvéd)
—	MF	HUN	Tamás Kiss (from Cegléd)
—	MF	HUN	László Nagy (from Gyirmót)
—	FW	USA	Brendan Stelkam (from Mosonmagyaróvár)
—	MF	HUN	Attila Horváth (loan return from Ajka)

Out: Note: Flags indicate national team as defined under FIFA eligibility rules; some limited exceptions apply. Players may hold more than one non-FIFA nationality.

No.	Pos.	Nation	Player
1	GK	HUN	Márk Heinrich (to Sopron)
4	DF	HUN	András Fejes (loan return to Videoton II)
5	MF	HUN	Vilmos Melczer (to Mezőkövesd)
8	MF	HUN	József Windecker (loan return to Győr)
10	FW	HUN	János Máté (loan return to Ferencváros)
11	MF	HUN	Máté Kiss (loan return to Győr)
12	GK	HUN	Péter Kurucz (to Ferencváros)
13	MF	HUN	Tamás Kecskés (to Paks)
14	FW	HUN	Szabolcs Pál
15	DF	HUN	Marcell Fodor (loan return to Újpest)
16	DF	SRB	Stefan Deák (loan return to (Spain) Deportivo B)
17	MF	HUN	Tamás Nagy (to (Australia) Southern Stars)
18	MF	HUN	András Gál (to (Austria) Scheibbs)
20	DF	HUN	Tibor Nyári (to Paks)
21	DF	HUN	Zoltán Kiss (to (Austria) Saalfelden)
—	MF	HUN	Attila Horváth (to Ajka)

=== Sopron ===
In: Note: Flags indicate national team as defined under FIFA eligibility rules; some limited exceptions apply. Players may hold more than one non-FIFA nationality.

No.	Pos.	Nation	Player
4	FW	HUN	Ádám Kiss (loan return from Csorna)
8	MF	HUN	Bálint Nyilasi (from Ferencváros II)
10	FW	HUN	Zsolt Szabó (from Veszprém)
11	DF	HUN	Tamás Sifter (from Paks)
17	FW	HUN	László Erdélyi (loan from Honvéd II)
26	MF	HUN	László Németh (loan from Győr II)
29	FW	HUN	László Szabó (from MTK II)
37	DF	HUN	Richárd Czár (loan from Honvéd)
44	DF	HUN	Patrik Pados (from Sopron U-19)
63	MF	HUN	József Maráczi (from Szombathely II)
69	MF	HUN	Máté Tóth (from BKV Előre)
77	GK	HUN	Márk Heinrich (from Siófok)
88	MF	HUN	Péter Horváth (from Honvéd II)
97	GK	HUN	Péter Halasi (from Vasas)

Out: Note: Flags indicate national team as defined under FIFA eligibility rules; some limited exceptions apply. Players may hold more than one non-FIFA nationality.

No.	Pos.	Nation	Player
1	GK	SVK	Luboš Ilizi
4	FW	HUN	Ádám Kiss (to Sopron)
5	DF	HUN	Ákos Seper (to (Austria) Hartberg)
8	DF	HUN	Attila Pintér
10	FW	HUN	Ádám Balla (to ESMTK)
13	GK	HUN	Zsolt Payrits
17	DF	HUN	Márk Mészáros (to Nyírbátor)
26	DF	HUN	Zalán Vadas (to BKV Előre)
37	MF	HUN	Ádám Madarász
63	MF	HUN	József Maráczi (loan return to Szombathely II)
69	MF	HUN	Donát Laczkovich
88	MF	HUN	Péter Horváth (loan return to Honvéd II)
97	GK	HUN	Bálint Sásdi (to Körmend)

=== Szigetszentmiklós ===
In: Note: Flags indicate national team as defined under FIFA eligibility rules; some limited exceptions apply. Players may hold more than one non-FIFA nationality.

No.	Pos.	Nation	Player
1	GK	HUN	András Sánta (from Pécs)
7	DF	HUN	János Nagy (loan from Újpest)
10	MF	HUN	Norbert Zsivóczky (from Ferencváros)
14	FW	HUN	Péter Bonifert (from (Austria) Leoben)
16	MF	HUN	Aurél Farkas (from Honvéd II)
16	FW	HUN	László Fekete (loan return from Diósd)
17	DF	HUN	Miklós Balogh (from Békéscsaba)
20	MF	BIH	Eldar Pilavdžić (from (Bosnia and Herzegovina) Zvijezda)
22	DF	HUN	Dávid Csikortás (loan from MTK Academy)
24	DF	HUN	Zoltán Pollák (from Újpest)
26	DF	SRB	Slobodan Jakovljević (from (Serbia) Inđija)
27	FW	CRO	Enis Šoškić (from (Croatia) Buje)
30	MF	AUT	Tim Heinemann (from (Austria) Leoben)

Out: Note: Flags indicate national team as defined under FIFA eligibility rules; some limited exceptions apply. Players may hold more than one non-FIFA nationality.

No.	Pos.	Nation	Player
1	GK	HUN	Tamás Kozma (to Salgótarján)
1	GK	HUN	Kálmán Szabó (end of career)
3	DF	HUN	Gábor Szamosszegi (to Tatabánya)
4	MF	CRO	Saša Macura (loan return to MTK II)
6	MF	HUN	Attila Cziráki (loan return to Paks II)
8	MF	HUN	Norbert Zsivóczky (loan return to Ferencváros)
16	FW	BRA	Karion
16	FW	HUN	László Fekete (to Diósd)
17	DF	HUN	Miklós Balogh (loan return to Békéscsaba)
18	FW	FRA	Mamadou Doucouré
23	MF	HUN	Attila Besztercei (loan return to MTK II)
27	FW	HUN	Gábor Urbán (to Dunaújváros)
33	GK	BIH	Selmir Brkić (to (Bosnia and Herzegovina) Zvijezda)

=== Szolnok ===
In: Note: Flags indicate national team as defined under FIFA eligibility rules; some limited exceptions apply. Players may hold more than one non-FIFA nationality.

No.	Pos.	Nation	Player
4	MF	HUN	Mátyás Magos (from Újpest II)
5	MF	HUN	Dávid Zvara (from Eger)
9	FW	HUN	János Máté (from Ferencváros)
18	FW	HUN	István Nagy (loan from Paks)
19	FW	HUN	Barnabás Vári (loan from Paks)
21	MF	HUN	Roland Bohner (loan from Paks)
23	DF	HUN	Artur Papizsanszkij (from Vasas II)
26	DF	HUN	Tamás Grúz (loan from Ferencváros)

Out: Note: Flags indicate national team as defined under FIFA eligibility rules; some limited exceptions apply. Players may hold more than one non-FIFA nationality.

No.	Pos.	Nation	Player
9	FW	HUN	Dávid Kocsis (to Rákosmente)
22	DF	HUN	Viktor Urbán-Szabó (to Jánoshida)
11	MF	HUN	Attila Busai (loan return to Ferencváros)
15	DF	HUN	Attila Gyagya (loan return to Kecskemét)
19	FW	HUN	Barnabás Vári (loan return to Paks)
20	MF	HUN	Gábor Tamási (loan return to Paks)
21	MF	HUN	Roland Bohner (loan return to Paks)
26	DF	HUN	Tamás Grúz (loan return to Ferencváros)
36	FW	HUN	István Nagy (loan return to Paks)

=== Tatabánya ===
In: Note: Flags indicate national team as defined under FIFA eligibility rules; some limited exceptions apply. Players may hold more than one non-FIFA nationality.

No.	Pos.	Nation	Player
2	DF	HUN	Tamás Páles (from Berkenye)
3	DF	HUN	Gábor Szamosszegi (from Szigetszentmiklós)
9	FW	HUN	Bence Szabó (from Eger)
13	DF	HUN	László Szűcs (from Sárisáp)
12	GK	HUN	Róbert Farkasdi (from Sárisáp)
16	MF	HUN	István Ludánszki (from Balmazújváros)
19	DF	HUN	Attila Besztercei (loan from MTK II)
21	MF	HUN	József Bozsik (from Sárisáp)
28	DF	HUN	György Radnai (from Szeged)
50	MF	HUN	Gergő Gyürki (from Pénzügyőr)

Out: Note: Flags indicate national team as defined under FIFA eligibility rules; some limited exceptions apply. Players may hold more than one non-FIFA nationality.

No.	Pos.	Nation	Player
4	DF	HUN	Gergő Oláh (loan return to Debrecen II)
7	MF	HUN	Tamás Huszák (loan return to Debrecen II)
9	MF	HUN	Máté Skriba (loan return to Szombathely)
11	DF	HUN	Dávid Szekér (to Rákospalota)
12	GK	HUN	Gergely Gyulay (loan return to Videoton U-19)
13	DF	HUN	Tamás Törtei (to Nyíregyháza)
14	DF	HUN	Martin Izing (loan return to Videoton II)
19	DF	HUN	Norbert Hegedűs
20	MF	SRB	Đorđe Đurić (loan return to MTK)
21	MF	HUN	Gergely Tóth (loan return to Videoton U-19)
22	GK	HUN	Péter Szappanos
23	FW	SRB	Mladen Čović
24	DF	HUN	Attila Böjte (end of career)
27	MF	HUN	Richárd Frank (loan return to MTK)

=== Vasas ===
In: Note: Flags indicate national team as defined under FIFA eligibility rules; some limited exceptions apply. Players may hold more than one non-FIFA nationality.

No.	Pos.	Nation	Player
2	DF	BRA	Fabrício Lopes (from (Brazil) Sampaio)
3	DF	HUN	Gábor Nagy (from Gyirmót)
4	DF	ROU	Horia Crişan (from Putnok)
5	DF	GER	Tom Schulz (from (Germany) Hansa Rostock)
9	FW	HUN	Balázs Zamostny (loan from Újpest II)
10	MF	HUN	Mohamed Remili (from Újpest)
14	DF	HUN	Martin Izing (from Videoton II)
16	MF	HUN	József Boda (from Kozármisleny)
19	MF	HUN	Zoltán Szedlár (from Vasas U-19)
20	MF	HUN	Levente Horváth (from Pápa)
21	MF	HUN	Mátyás Gál (loan from Debrecen II)
22	DF	HUN	Alex Engel (loan from Debrecen II)
22	DF	HUN	Gábor Polényi (loan return from Putnok)
24	FW	BRA	Boka (from (Brazil) Noroeste)
25	MF	HUN	Máté Vida (from Vasas U-19)
26	FW	HUN	Bence Balogh (loan return from Budaörs)
31	GK	HUN	Bence Hermány (from Ferencváros II)
33	GK	HUN	Gábor Németh (from Paks)

Out: Note: Flags indicate national team as defined under FIFA eligibility rules; some limited exceptions apply. Players may hold more than one non-FIFA nationality.

No.	Pos.	Nation	Player
1	GK	HUN	Zoltán Szatmári
4	MF	HUN	Bertold Popovics
5	MF	HUN	Reidan Salem
6	MF	HUN	Balázs Venczel
7	FW	HUN	Bence Balogh (to Budaörs)
9	FW	HUN	Péter Szilágyi (to Nyíregyháza)
10	FW	BRA	Bobô (to (Portugal) Boavista)
11	MF	HUN	Ádám Ferkó (to Budaörs)
12	GK	HUN	Péter Halasi (to Sopron)
13	DF	HUN	Vitéz Kárpáti (to (Portugal) Ribeirão)
15	DF	HUN	Máté Katona
16	DF	HUN	Balázs Nikolov (to Biatorbágy)
19	FW	CAN	Igor Pisanjuk
20	MF	BIH	Haris Mehmedagić (to (Croatia) Novigrad)
21	DF	BRA	Lucas (to Kaposvár)
22	DF	HUN	Gábor Polényi (to Nyíregyháza)
23	DF	HUN	Zsolt Merczel (to BKV Előre)
23	MF	HUN	Dániel Kovács (to Kozármisleny)
24	MF	HUN	Péter Simek (to Rákospalota)
25	FW	HUN	Patrik Csoór
26	GK	HUN	András Horváth (to Hatvan)
29	MF	BRA	Deyvison
33	MF	BRA	Thiago (to (Israel) Ramat Gan)

=== Várda ===
In: Note: Flags indicate national team as defined under FIFA eligibility rules; some limited exceptions apply. Players may hold more than one non-FIFA nationality.

No.	Pos.	Nation	Player
1	GK	HUN	Péter Nacsa (loan from Győr)
3	DF	UKR	Róbert Molnár (from (Ukraine) Uzhhorod II)
6	MF	HUN	Attila Varga (from Ibrány)
11	MF	HUN	Szabolcs Üveges (from Putnok)
12	FW	HUN	Tibor Soós (from Nyírbátor)
15	MF	HUN	László Horváth (from BKV Előre)
17	MF	HUN	Bálint Nagy (from Szombathely II)
19	MF	HUN	Valér Kapacina (from Honvéd II)
22	FW	HUN	Balázs Pálvölgyi (from Nyírbátor)
23	FW	BRA	Bouard Ramos (from Salgótarján)
25	FW	SRB	Dušan Pavlov (from Eger)
—	DF	HUN	Tamás Sipos (from Pápa)

Out: Note: Flags indicate national team as defined under FIFA eligibility rules; some limited exceptions apply. Players may hold more than one non-FIFA nationality.

No.	Pos.	Nation	Player
3	DF	HUN	Ádám Mező

=== Zalaegerszeg ===
In: Note: Flags indicate national team as defined under FIFA eligibility rules; some limited exceptions apply. Players may hold more than one non-FIFA nationality.

No.	Pos.	Nation	Player
11	MF	HUN	Gábor Vayer (from Paks)
14	DF	HUN	Csaba Preklet (from Eger)
15	MF	HUN	Kornél Kulcsár (loan from Szombathely)
17	FW	BRA	Tanque (from Eger)
21	DF	ITA	Paolo Mavolo (loan return from Nagykanizsa)
22	GK	HUN	Zoltán Czirjék (from Puskás)
23	GK	HUN	Ákos Vörös (loan return from Hévíz)
25	FW	BIH	Mahir Jasarević (loan return from Pápa)
30	DF	HUN	Viktor Buzás (from Rákospalota)
30	MF	HUN	Szabolcs Csordás (loan return from Csákvár)

Out: Note: Flags indicate national team as defined under FIFA eligibility rules; some limited exceptions apply. Players may hold more than one non-FIFA nationality.

No.	Pos.	Nation	Player
2	DF	HUN	Gergely Kocsárdi (end of career)
7	FW	HUN	Barnabás Babos
14	MF	BLR	Aleksandr Tishkevich (to (Lithuania) Kruoja)
15	FW	SEN	Mouhamadou Seye (loan return to Pápa)
17	DF	HUN	Krisztián Budovinszky
21	DF	ITA	Paolo Mavolo (loan to Andráshida)
22	GK	SVK	Pavol Penksa
23	GK	HUN	Ákos Vörös (loan to Körmend)
23	MF	SVK	Marián Sluka
25	FW	BIH	Mahir Jasarević (loan to Andráshida)
30	MF	HUN	Szabolcs Csordás (to Nyíregyháza)
