= 2010–11 BFC Siófok season =

Siófok
2010–11 season
- Chairman: György Gruber Jr.
- Manager: István Mihalecz Jr.
- Stadium: Révész Géza utcai Stadion
- Nemzeti Bajnokság I: 14th
- Magyar Kupa: Quarter-finals
- Ligakupa: Quarter-finals
- Top goalscorer: League: Kazuo Honma (8); All: Kazuo Honma (10)
- Highest home attendance: 7,000 v Újpest (14 August 2010, Nemzeti Bajnokság I)
- Lowest home attendance: 50 v Zalaegerszeg (22 February 2011, Ligakupa)
- Average home league attendance: 1,786
- Biggest win: 4–0 v Szolnok (Away, 2 October 2010, Nemzeti Bajnokság I)
- Biggest defeat: 0–4 v Zalaegerszeg (Home, 16 October 2010, Nemzeti Bajnokság I); 0–4 v Haladás (Away, 23 October 2010, Nemzeti Bajnokság I); 0–4 v Zalaegerszeg (Home, 22 February 2011, Ligakupa); 1–5 v Kecskemét (Away, 9 March 2011, Magyar Kupa)

The 2010–11 season was Bodajk Futball Club Siófok's 18th competitive season, 81st season in existence as a football club and first season in the Nemzeti Bajnokság I after winning the West group of the second division in the previous season. In addition to the domestic league, Siófok participated in that season's editions of the Magyar Kupa and the Ligakupa.

On 13 July 2010, István Mihalecz Jr. was named manager of Siófok after the previous manager, Károly Horváth, had not yet received his Pro Licence certificate. The professional work continued to be done by Horváth.

== Squad ==
Squad at end of season

Note: Flags indicate national team as defined under FIFA eligibility rules; some limited exceptions apply. Players may hold more than one non-FIFA nationality.

No.	Pos.	Nation	Player
1	GK	HUN	Pál Szalma
2	DF	HUN	József Mogyorósi
3	DF	HUN	Zsolt Fehér
4	DF	HUN	András László
5	MF	HUN	Vilmos Melczer
6	DF	HUN	Richárd Tusori
7	MF	HUN	Balázs Tóth B.
8	MF	HUN	Tihamér Lukács
9	FW	HUN	Gergely Délczeg
10	FW	NGA	Henry Isaac
11	MF	HUN	Szabolcs Kanta
12	GK	SVK	Péter Molnár
13	MF	HUN	Tamás Kecskés
14	MF	HUN	Mihály Marozsán
15	FW	CIV	Jean-Paul Nomel

No.	Pos.	Nation	Player
16	FW	HUN	Imre Csermelyi
17	FW	JPN	Kazuo Honma
18	MF	HUN	István Ludánszki
19	FW	HUN	Szilárd Pécseli
20	FW	HUN	Csaba Csordás
21	MF	HUN	Máté Szesztrás
23	DF	HUN	Attila Katona
24	MF	HUN	Attila Horváth
25	DF	HUN	Dávid Márton
26	GK	HUN	Balázs Bartus
27	FW	HUN	Gábor Gadó
28	DF	HUN	Károly Graszl
29	DF	HUN	Alexisz Novák
33	MF	HUN	Martin Magyar

== Transfers ==
=== Transfers in ===
Transfer window	Pos.	No.	Player	From
Summer	MF	8	(Hungary) Tihamér Lukács	(Russia) Nizhny Novgorod
Summer	MF	13	(Hungary) Tamás Kecskés	MTK
Summer	FW	16	(Hungary) Imre Csermelyi	Gyirmót
Summer	DF	29	(Hungary) Alexisz Novák	Honvéd II
Winter	FW	15	(Ivory Coast) Jean-Paul Nomel	KITE-Szeged
Winter	FW	20	(Hungary) Csaba Csordás	Kecskemét
Winter	DF	23	(Hungary) Attila Katona	Debrecen

=== Transfers out ===
Transfer window	Pos.	No.	Player	To
Summer	DF	5	(Hungary) Márk Sallér	Ajka
Summer	DF	6	(Hungary) Balázs Tóth	Gyirmót
Summer	FW	7	(Brazil) Roni Ribeiro	Budaörs
Summer	FW	7	(Hungary) Roland Ribi	Released
Summer	MF	8	(Hungary) Lajos Nagy	Cegléd
Summer	DF	19	(Hungary) Dániel Köntös	Tatabánya
Summer	MF	23	(Hungary) Zoltán Arany	Dunakanyar-Vác
Winter	FW	21	(Hungary) Thomas Sowunmi	(Cyprus) APOP Kinyras

=== Loans in ===
Transfer window	Pos.	No.	Player	From	End date
Summer	MF	7	(Hungary) Gellért Ivancsics	Zalaegerszeg	Middle of season
Summer	GK	12	(Slovakia) Péter Molnár	Győr	End of season
Summer	FW	17	(Japan) Kazuo Honma	Nyíregyháza	End of season
Summer	MF	20	(Hungary) József Piller	Vasas	Middle of season
Summer	DF	23	(Hungary) Gábor Kocsis	Videoton	Middle of season
Winter	MF	5	(Hungary) Vilmos Melczer	Budaörs	End of season
Winter	MF	7	(Hungary) Balázs Tóth B.	Paks	End of season
Winter	MF	14	(Hungary) Mihály Marozsán	Újfehértó	End of season

=== Loans out ===
Transfer window	Pos.	No.	Player	To	End date
Winter	FW	10	(Brazil) Thiago Ribeiro	Barcs	End of season

== Competitions ==
=== Overview ===
Competition	First match	Last match	Starting round	Final position	Record							
Competition	First match	Last match	Starting round	Final position	Pld	W	D	L	GF	GA	GD	Win %
Nemzeti Bajnokság I	1 August 2010	22 May 2011	Matchday 1	14th	30	8	10	12	29	41	−12	26.67
Magyar Kupa	22 September 2010	15 March 2011	Third round	Quarter-finals	6	3	1	2	10	10	+0	50.00
Ligakupa	29 July 2010	22 February 2011	Group stage	Quarter-finals	6	4	1	1	10	7	+3	66.67
Total					42	15	12	15	49	58	−9	35.71

Source: Competitions

=== Nemzeti Bajnokság I ===
==== League table ====
Pos	Team	Pld	W	D	L	GF	GA	GD	Pts	Qualification or relegation
12	Kecskemét	30	11	3	16	51	56	−5	36	Qualification for Europa League second qualifying round (Note: Kecskemét have qualified for the second qualifying round of the 2011–12 UEFA Europa League after winning the 2010–11 Hungarian Cup.)
13	Pápa	30	10	5	15	39	52	−13	35	
14	Siófok	30	8	10	12	29	41	−12	34	
15	MTK (R)	30	8	6	16	35	49	−14	30	Relegation to Nemzeti Bajnokság II
16	Szolnok (R)	30	5	6	19	26	56	−30	21	Relegation to Nemzeti Bajnokság II

Source: soccerway.com
Rules for classification: 1st points; 2nd overall wins; 3rd goal difference; 4th goals scored
(R) Relegated

==== Results summary ====
Overall								Home						Away					
Pld	W	D	L	GF	GA	GD	Pts	W	D	L	GF	GA	GD	W	D	L	GF	GA	GD
30	8	10	12	29	41	−12	34	1	8	6	11	19	−8	7	2	6	18	22	−4

Source: Hungarian Football Federation

==== Results by round ====
Round	1	2	3	4	5	6	7	8	9	10	11	12	13	14	15	16	17	18	19	20	21	22	23	24	25	26	27	28	29	30
Ground	H	A	H	H	A	H	A	H	A	H	A	H	A	H	A	A	H	A	A	H	A	H	A	H	A	H	A	H	A	H
Result	D	L	D	D	L	D	W	W	W	L	L	L	D	L	W	L	L	D	L	D	W	D	W	D	L	D	W	L	W	L
Position	6	12	12	14	15	15	13	13	10	12	12	13	13	14	13	14	15	15	15	15	15	15	14	14	14	14	14	14	14	14
Points	1	1	2	3	3	4	7	10	13	13	13	13	14	14	17	17	17	18	18	19	22	23	26	27	27	28	31	31	34	34

Source: Matches
A = Away; H = Home; W = Win; D = Draw; L = Loss

==== Matches ====
1 August 2010 1	Siófok	1–1	Videoton	Siófok
17:30 CEST (UTC+2)	Sowunmi 33', (yellow card) 52'; Piller (yellow card) 38'; Mogyorósi (yellow card) 76'; Ludánszki (yellow card) 88'	Report	Horváth (yellow card) 36'; Vujović 62'; Farkas (yellow card) 85'	Stadium: Révész Géza utcai Stadion; Attendance: 5,000; Referee: Ádám Németh; Assistant referees: Arnold Kepe, Balázs Farkas; Fourth official: Norbert Kiss

8 August 2010 2	Győr	1–0	Siófok	Győr
20:00 CEST (UTC+2)	Sharashenidze (yellow card) 55'; Aleksidze 68'; Stevanović (yellow card) 76'; Tokody (yellow card) 89'	Report	Mogyorósi (red card) 67'; Piller (red card) 76'	Stadium: ETO Park; Attendance: 3,000; Referee: Gábor Oláh; Assistant referees: Zsolt Butkai, Zsolt Márton; Fourth official: Gergő Janitz

14 August 2010 3	Siófok	1–1	Újpest	Siófok
20:00 CEST (UTC+2)	Ludánszki (yellow card) 38'; Graszl 52', (yellow card) 90'; Délczeg (yellow card) 76'	Report	Sitku (yellow card) 53'; Kiss (yellow card) 86'; Tajthy 86'	Stadium: Révész Géza utcai Stadion; Attendance: 7,000; Referee: Mihály Fábián; Assistant referees: Dr. Zsolt Varga, Zoltán Pápai; Fourth official: Róbert Nagy

21 August 2010 4	Siófok	0–0	Kaposvár	Siófok
19:00 CEST (UTC+2)		Report	Szepessy (yellow card) 19'; Okuka (yellow card) 26'; Oláh (yellow card) 88'; Hegedűs (yellow card) 90+1'	Stadium: Révész Géza utcai Stadion; Attendance: 2,500; Referee: Tamás Bognár; Assistant referees: Balázs Huszár, István Iványi; Fourth official: Béla Botló

27 August 2010 5	Vasas	3–0	Siófok	Budapest
17:00 CEST (UTC+2)	Mileusnić (yellow card) 39'; Ferenczi 54', 68', (yellow card) 65'; Katona 88'	Report		Stadium: Illovszky Rudolf Stadion; Attendance: 2,000; Referee: Ádám Farkas; Assistant referees: Péter Berettyán, Róbert Horváth; Fourth official: Róbert Nagy

11 September 2010 6	Siófok	0–0	MTK	Siófok
18:00 CEST (UTC+2)	Graszl (yellow card) 62'	Report	Szabó (yellow card) 73'	Stadium: Révész Géza utcai Stadion; Attendance: 342; Referee: Zsolt Szabó; Assistant referees: Róbert Kispál, Balázs Farkas; Fourth official: Balázs Berke

18 September 2010 7	Ferencváros	1–2	Siófok	Budapest
17:30 CEST (UTC+2)	Schembri 71'; Rósa (yellow card) 81'; Aílton (yellow card) 90+2'	Report	Sowunmi (yellow card) 19', (goal) 69'; Kecskés (yellow card) 23'; Honma 41'	Stadium: Stadion Albert Flórián; Attendance: 2,500; Referee: Ádám Németh; Assistant referees: Vencel Tóth II, István Tóth; Fourth official: Ádám Farkas

25 September 2010 8	Siófok	4–1	Debrecen	Siófok
15:00 CEST (UTC+2)	Tusori 11', 44'; Sowunmi 19', 28', (yellow card) 63'; Lukács (yellow card) 56'; Fehér (yellow card) 65'; Honma (yellow card) 65'	Report	Varga (yellow card) 37'; Laczkó (yellow card) 42'; Szakály 50'; Ramos (yellow card) 85'	Stadium: Révész Géza utcai Stadion; Attendance: 1,000; Referee: Zoltán Iványi; Assistant referees: Balázs Farkas, János Medovarszki; Fourth official: Tibor Gyarmati II

2 October 2010 9	Szolnok	0–4	Siófok	Szolnok
13:00 CEST (UTC+2)	Vörös (yellow card) 41'; Remili (yellow card) 89'	Report	Honma 5'; Lukács 8'; Novák 59'; Graszl 74'	Stadium: Tiszaligeti Stadion; Attendance: 500; Referee: Sándor Andó-Szabó; Assistant referees: István Albert, Péter Berettyán; Fourth official: Gergely Szőts

16 October 2010 10	Siófok	0–4	Zalaegerszeg	Siófok
17:00 CEST (UTC+2)	Graszl (yellow card) 42'; Kecskés (yellow card) 52'; Novák (yellow card) 80'	Report	Balázs 29'; Panikvar (yellow card) 53'; Miljatovič (yellow card) 57'; Simon 67'; Mogyorósi 72' (o.g.); Kamber 78'	Stadium: Révész Géza utcai Stadion; Attendance: 1,500; Referee: István Vad; Assistant referees: György Ring, Balázs Huszár; Fourth official: Csaba Pintér

23 October 2010 11	Haladás	4–0	Siófok	Szombathely
16:00 CEST (UTC+2)	Kenesei 35'; Sipos (yellow card) 44'; P. Tóth 74', (yellow card) 86'; G. Nagy II 79', 90'	Report	Fehér (yellow card) 34'; Kecskés (red card) 65'; Tusori (yellow card) 73'; Kocsis (yellow card) 83'	Stadium: Rohonci út Attendance: 3,500; Referee: Péter Solymosi; Assistant referees: Oszkár Lémon, Gábor Takács; Fourth official: Dávid Ákos

30 October 2010 12	Siófok	0–1	Pápa	Siófok
17:00 CEST (UTC+2)	Graszl (yellow card) 29'	Report	Marić 53'; N. Tóth (yellow card) 89'	Stadium: Révész Géza utcai Stadion; Attendance: 600; Referee: Roland Veizer; Assistant referees: Péter Berettyán, Róbert Horváth; Fourth official: Balázs Böcskei

6 November 2010 13	Paks	0–0	Siófok	Paks
16:00 CET (UTC+1)	Kiss (yellow card) 53'	Report	Mogyorósi (yellow card) 81'	Stadium: Fehérvári úti Stadion; Attendance: 1,000; Referee: Mihály Fábián; Assistant referees: János Demeter, István Iványi; Fourth official: Béla Botló

13 November 2010 14	Siófok	1–2	Kecskemét	Siófok
15:00 CET (UTC+1)	Mohl 39' (o.g.)	Report	Kéthévoama 43'; Tököli 76'	Stadium: Révész Géza utcai Stadion; Attendance: 1,000; Referee: Viktor Kassai; Assistant referees: Vencel Tóth II, Zsolt Márton; Fourth official: József Erdős

19 November 2010 15	Honvéd	0–1	Siófok	Budapest
19:00 CET (UTC+1)	Akassou (yellow card) 71'; Hajdú (yellow card) 76'	Report	Délczeg 40'; Mogyorósi (yellow card) 47'; Márton (yellow card) 68'; Graszl (yellow card) 72'	Stadium: Bozsik József Stadion; Attendance: 700; Referee: Sándor Andó-Szabó; Assistant referees: Dr. Zsolt Varga, János Demeter; Fourth official: Katalin Kulcsár

27 November 2010 16	Videoton	2–0	Siófok	Székesfehérvár
15:00 CET (UTC+1)	Sándor 59'; Nikolić 62'	Report	Novák (yellow card) 29'	Stadium: Sóstói Stadion; Attendance: 2,228; Referee: Ádám Farkas; Assistant referees: Attila Kelemen, Tamás Márkus; Fourth official: László Varga

25 February 2011 17	Siófok	0–1	Győr	Siófok
17:00 CET (UTC+1)	Graszl (yellow card) 90+1'	Report	Aleksidze 20', (yellow card) 73'	Stadium: Révész Géza utcai Stadion; Attendance: 300; Referee: Roland Veizer; Assistant referees: Péter Berettyán, Róbert Horváth; Fourth official: Péter Solymosi

4 March 2011 18	Újpest	1–1	Siófok	Budapest
19:00 CET (UTC+1)	Takács (yellow card) 41'; Lázár (yellow card) 47', (goal) 55'	Report	Novák 70'; Lukács (yellow card) 90+1'	Stadium: Szusza Ferenc Stadion; Attendance: 3,056; Referee: Péter Solymosi; Assistant referees: Attila Kelemen, István Tóth; Fourth official: László Varga

12 March 2011 19	Kaposvár	3–0	Siófok	Kaposvár
16:00 CET (UTC+1)	Perić 23'; Oláh 35', (yellow card) 37'; Gujić (yellow card) 63'; Balázs 85'	Report	Katona (red card) 37'; Kecskés (yellow card) 56'	Stadium: Rákóczi Stadion; Attendance: 3,000; Referee: Ádám Németh; Assistant referees: Balázs Farkas, Zsolt Butkai; Fourth official: Béla Botló

19 March 2011 20	Siófok	0–0	Vasas	Siófok
15:00 CET (UTC+1)	Mogyorósi (yellow card) 73'	Report	Katona (yellow card) 40'; Arsić (yellow card) 70'	Stadium: Révész Géza utcai Stadion; Attendance: 300; Referee: Zsolt Szabó; Assistant referees: Róbert Kispál, Arnold Kepe; Fourth official: József Erdős

2 April 2011 21	MTK	1–2	Siófok	Budapest
17:00 CEST (UTC+2)	Vadnai (yellow card) 19'; Tischler (yellow card) 52'; Sütő 57'	Report	Délczeg 39', 78'; Fehér (yellow card) 56'	Stadium: Hidegkuti Nándor Stadion; Attendance: 800; Referee: Mihály Fábián; Assistant referees: Tamás Márkus, Zoltán Pápai; Fourth official: Balázs Berke

9 April 2011 22	Siófok	1–1	Ferencváros	Siófok
15:00 CEST (UTC+2)	Délczeg 19'; Kecskés (yellow card) 29'; Lukács (yellow card) 84'	Report	Schembri (yellow card) 13', (goal) 64'; Tóth (yellow card) 32'; Heinz (yellow card) 48'	Stadium: Révész Géza utcai Stadion; Attendance: 4,000; Referee: Zsolt Szabó; Assistant referees: Róbert Kispál, Balázs Farkas; Fourth official: Tibor Farkas

16 April 2011 23	Debrecen	2–3	Siófok	Debrecen
15:00 CEST (UTC+2)	Mardare (yellow card) 16'; Varga (yellow card) 30'; Mijadinoski (red card) 45'; Coulibaly 55'; Bódi 59'	Report	Délczeg (yellow card) 8', (goal) 14'; Honma 45'; Tusori 52'; Graszl (yellow card) 58'; Lukács (yellow card) 80'	Stadium: Oláh Gábor utcai Stadion; Attendance: 3,500; Referee: Zoltán Iványi; Assistant referees: Attila Forgács, Zoltán Kis; Fourth official: Gábor Fajkusz

23 April 2011 24	Siófok	1–1	Szolnok	Siófok
17:00 CEST (UTC+2)	Mogyorósi (yellow card) 20'; Délczeg 74'	Report	Miličić 35'	Stadium: Révész Géza utcai Stadion; Attendance: 1,000; Referee: Péter Solymosi; Assistant referees: Péter Berettyán, Róbert Horváth; Fourth official: László Varga

27 April 2011 25	Zalaegerszeg	2–1	Siófok	Zalaegerszeg
18:00 CEST (UTC+2)	Kocsárdi (yellow card) 12'; Turkovs 15'; Simon 54'; Bogunović (red card) 64'	Report	Isaac (yellow card) 25'; Ludánszki (yellow card) 53'; Csordás 64'; Tusori (yellow card) 72'; Novák (yellow card) 77'	Stadium: ZTE Arena; Attendance: 2,038; Referee: Sándor Andó-Szabó; Assistant referees: György Ring, Balázs Huszár; Fourth official: Csaba Pintér

30 April 2011 26	Siófok	0–0	Haladás	Siófok
18:00 CEST (UTC+2)	Graszl (yellow card) 37'; Lukács (yellow card) 86'	Report	Iszlai (yellow card) 7'; Á. Simon (yellow card) 61'; Korolovszky (yellow card) 77'	Stadium: Révész Géza utcai Stadion; Attendance: 750; Referee: Ádám Németh; Assistant referees: Gábor Takács, Zsolt Márton; Fourth official: Béla Botló

7 May 2011 27	Pápa	0–1	Siófok	Pápa
19:00 CEST (UTC+2)	Žuļevs (yellow card) 43'; Dlusztus (red card) 53'	Report	Mogyorósi (yellow card) 44'; Graszl (red card) 75'; Csermelyi 80', (yellow card) 88'	Stadium: Perutz Stadion; Attendance: 1,200; Referee: Zoltán Iványi; Assistant referees: János Demeter, Zsolt Butkai; Fourth official: László Varga

10 May 2011 28	Siófok	1–3	Paks	Siófok
17:30 CEST (UTC+2)	Honma 15'; Tusori (yellow card) 37'; Katona (yellow card) 64'; Fehér (yellow card) 75'; Mogyorósi (yellow card) 86'; Isaac (yellow card) 90'	Report	Sifter 20'; Böde 33'; Éger 81'	Stadium: Révész Géza utcai Stadion; Attendance: 500; Referee: Álvaro García Miquel; Assistant referees: István Albert, Péter Berettyán; Fourth official: László Lovas

14 May 2011 29	Kecskemét	2–3	Siófok	Kecskemét
19:00 CEST (UTC+2)	Patvaros (yellow card) 9'; Bori 17'; Bertus 53'	Report	Honma 10', 38', 58'	Stadium: Széktói Stadion; Attendance: 2,500; Referee: Péter Solymosi; Assistant referees: Zsolt Szpisják, Gábor Kormányos II; Fourth official: Ferenc Karakó

22 May 2011 30	Siófok	1–3	Honvéd	Siófok
15:00 CEST (UTC+2)	Mogyorósi (yellow card) 18'; Novák (yellow card) 24'; Honma 40'; Márton (yellow card) 46'; Melczer (yellow card) 67'; Tusori (yellow card) 87'	Report	Cirino 6'; Zelenka (yellow card) 25'; Vernes (yellow card) 48'; Délczeg 51' (o.g.); Czár 90'	Stadium: Révész Géza utcai Stadion; Attendance: 1,000; Referee: Katalin Kulcsár; Assistant referees: Balázs Farkas, István Iványi; Fourth official: Béla Botló

=== Magyar Kupa ===
22 September 2010 Third round	Bonyhád	0–2	Siófok	Bonyhád
15:30 CEST (UTC+2)		Report	T. Ribeiro 64', 75'	Stadium: Sport úti Pálya; Attendance: 250; Referee: Tibor Farkas; Assistant referees: János Csák, Farhang Sarlakgoudarzi

27 October 2010 Round of 32	BKV Előre	1–2	Siófok	Budapest
14:30 CEST (UTC+2)	Mayer (yellow card) 17'; Cseri 49'; Kóré (yellow card) 61'; Miklósvári (yellow card) 84'	Report	Márton (yellow card) 23'; Mogyorósi (yellow card) 37'; Ivancsics 63'; Délczeg 65'; Csermelyi (yellow card) 81'; Piller (yellow card) 87'	Stadium: Sport utcai Stadion; Attendance: 150; Referee: Ádám Radványi; Assistant referees: Dr. Zsolt Varga, Zoltán Pápai

==== Round of 16 ====
10 November 2010 First leg	Siófok	3–1	Ferencváros	Siófok
18:00 CET (UTC+1)	László 7'; Csermelyi 45', 68'; Piller (yellow card) 90'	Report	B. Tóth (yellow card) 6'; Heinz (yellow card) 42'; Rodenbücher (yellow card) 78'; Stanić (yellow card) 87'; Andrezinho 90+1'	Stadium: Révész Géza utcai Stadion; Attendance: 1,000; Referee: Tamás Bognár; Assistant referees: Oszkár Lémon, Balázs Huszár; Fourth official: Csaba Pintér

1 March 2011 Second leg	Ferencváros	2–1 (3–4 agg.)	Siófok	Budapest
18:00 CET (UTC+1)	Miljković (yellow card) 48'; Tóth 55'; Schembri 61', (yellow card) 65'; Tutorić (yellow card) 71'; Morales (yellow card) 86'	Report	Fehér (yellow card) 14'; Honma 51'; Mogyorósi (yellow card) 67'; Lukács (yellow card) 70'; Horváth (yellow card) 90+2'	Stadium: Stadion Albert Flórián; Attendance: 2,000; Referee: Álvaro García Miquel; Assistant referees: Vencel Tóth II, Balázs Farkas; Fourth official: Gergely Szőts
Note: Siófok won 4–3 on aggregate.

==== Quarter-finals ====
9 March 2011 First leg	Kecskemét	5–1	Siófok	Kecskemét
17:00 CET (UTC+1)	Tököli 8'; Vujović 10', 23'; Savić 41'; Fehér 49' (o.g.); Radanović (yellow card) 62'	Report	Katona (yellow card) 28'; Márton 46'; Ludánszki (yellow card) 69'	Stadium: Széktói Stadion; Attendance: 1,500; Referee: Roland Veizer; Assistant referees: Péter Berettyán, Róbert Horváth

15 March 2011 Second leg	Siófok	1–1 (2–6 agg.)	Kecskemét	Siófok
14:00 CET (UTC+1)	Melczer 15'	Report	Savić (yellow card) 8'; Dosso 12'; Urbán (yellow card) 69'; Ebala (yellow card) 90'	Stadium: Révész Géza utcai Stadion; Attendance: 100; Referee: Katalin Kulcsár; Assistant referees: Tamás Péter, Roland Hofbauer
Note: Kecskemét won 6–2 on aggregate.

=== Ligakupa ===
==== Group stage ====
Pos	Team	Pld	W	D	L	GF	GA	GD	Pts	Qualification	SIÓ	ÚJP	KAP
1	Siófok	4	3	1	0	8	3	+5	10	Advance to knockout phase	—	1–0	1–1
2	Újpest	4	1	1	2	6	6	0	4		2–3	—	3–1
3	Kaposvár	4	0	2	2	3	8	−5	2		0–3	1–1	—

29 July 2010 1	Újpest	2–3	Siófok	Budapest
18:00 CEST (UTC+2)	Tisza 16', 38'; T. Horváth (yellow card) 50'	Report	R. Ribeiro 31'; Lukács 49'; Kocsis (yellow card) 59'; Sallér (yellow card) 63'; Délczeg 69'	Stadium: Szusza Ferenc Stadion; Attendance: 700; Referee: Szabolcs Szilasi; Assistant referees: Krisztián Király, Gábor Gyürüsi

3 November 2010 2	Siófok	1–1	Kaposvár	Siófok
17:15 CET (UTC+1)	Ivancsics (yellow card) 19', (goal) 36'	Report	Szepessy (yellow card) 33'; Kovács (yellow card) 55'; Zahorecz (yellow card) 67'; Pavlović 78'; Kulcsár (yellow card) 90+1'	Stadium: Révész Géza utcai Stadion; Attendance: 150; Referee: Gábor Oláh; Assistant referees: Tibor Gyarmati II, Zsolt Márton

24 November 2010 3	Kaposvár	0–3	Siófok	Kaposvár
18:00 CET (UTC+1)	Pavićević (yellow card) 33'	Report	T. Ribeiro 12'; Graszl (yellow card) 33'; Honma 65'; Kecskés 67'	Stadium: Rákóczi Stadion; Attendance: 200; Referee: Álvaro García Miquel; Assistant referees: Róbert Kispál, Zoltán Kis

8 December 2010 4	Siófok	1–0	Újpest	Siófok
13:00 CET (UTC+1)	Tóth 72'; Novák (yellow card) 77'	Report	Pollák (yellow card) 24'; Tajthy (yellow card) 60'; Szalai (yellow card) 72'	Stadium: Balatoni Vasas SE Sportpálya; Attendance: 200; Referee: Balázs Berke; Assistant referees: Zsolt Butkai, István Iványi

==== Knockout phase ====
===== Quarter-finals =====
19 February 2011 First leg	Zalaegerszeg	0–2	Siófok	Zalaegerszeg
13:00 CET (UTC+1)	Bogunović (yellow card) 45'; An. Horváth (yellow card) 56'; Kovács (yellow card) 90+1'	Report	Mogyorósi (yellow card) 29'; Turcsik 31' (o.g.); Délczeg (yellow card) 52', (goal) 58'; Melczer (yellow card) 84'	Stadium: ZTE Arena; Attendance: 250; Referee: Gábor Oláh; Assistant referees: Zsolt Márton, Gábor Kovács II

22 February 2011 Second leg	Siófok	0–4 (2–4 agg.)	Zalaegerszeg	Siófok
13:00 CET (UTC+1)	Fehér (yellow card) 30'	Report	An. Horváth 16'; Cebara 32'; Kocsárdi (yellow card) 52'; Panikvar (yellow card) 80'; A. Delić 83'; Simon 88'	Stadium: Balatoni Vasas SE Sportpálya; Attendance: 50; Referee: Gyöngyi Gaál; Assistant referees: Zsolt Butkai, Zoltán Bozó
Note: Zalaegerszeg won 4–2 on aggregate.

== Statistics ==
=== Overall ===
Appearances (Apps) numbers are for appearances in competitive games only, including sub appearances.
Source: Competitions

No.	Player	Pos.	Nemzeti Bajnokság I				Magyar Kupa				Ligakupa				Total			
No.	Player	Pos.	Apps	Goal	Booked	Sent off (straight red)	Apps	Goal	Booked	Sent off (straight red)	Apps	Goal	Booked	Sent off (straight red)	Apps	Goal	Booked	Sent off (straight red)
1	(Hungary) Pál Szalma	GK					4				5				9			
2	(Hungary) József Mogyorósi	DF	27		8	1	3		2		4		1		34		11	1
3	(Hungary) Zsolt Fehér	DF	25		4		2		1		4		1		31		6	
4	(Hungary) András László	DF	4				4	1			3				11	1		
5	(Hungary) András Hibácska	DF																
5	(Hungary) Vilmos Melczer	MF	14		1		2	1			2		1		18	1	2	
5	(Hungary) Márk Sallér	DF									1		1		1		1	
6	(Hungary) Richárd Tusori	DF	29	3	4		2				4				35	3	4	
7	(Hungary) Gellért Ivancsics	MF	11				2	1			2	1	1		15	2	1	
7	(Brazil) Roni Ribeiro	FW	3								1	1			4	1		
7	(Hungary) Balázs Tóth B.	MF									1				1			
8	(Hungary) Tihamér Lukács	MF	24	1	5		4		1		3	1			31	2	6	
9	(Hungary) Gergely Délczeg	FW	25	6	2		6	1			6	2	1		37	9	3	
10	(Nigeria) Henry Isaac	FW	7		2										7		2	
10	(Brazil) Thiago Ribeiro	FW	12				2	2			2	1			16	3		
11	(Hungary) Szabolcs Kanta	MF	1								1				2			
12	(Slovakia) Péter Molnár	GK	30				2				1				33			
13	(Hungary) Tamás Kecskés	MF	24		4	1	1				4	1			29	1	4	1
14	(Hungary) Mihály Marozsán	MF					2				1				3			
14	(Hungary) Róbert Tóth	MF	1				2				4	1			7	1		
15	(Hungary) János Hajdú	FW					1								1			
15	(Ivory Coast) Jean-Paul Nomel	FW	1								1				2			
15	(Hungary) Ferenc Varga	FW					2				2				4			
16	(Hungary) Imre Csermelyi	FW	15	1	1		4	2	1		2				21	3	2	
17	(Japan) Kazuo Honma	FW	25	8	1		2	1			3	1			30	10	1	
17	(Hungary) Péter Körösi																	
18	(Hungary) István Ludánszki	MF	19		3		4		1		5				28		4	
19	(Hungary) Szilárd Pécseli	FW	1				5				6				12			
20	(Hungary) Csaba Csordás	FW	12	1			1				1				14	1		
20	(Hungary) József Piller	MF	7		1	1	3		2		2				12		3	1
21	(Hungary) Thomas Sowunmi	FW	16	4	3						1				17	4	3	
21	(Hungary) Máté Szesztrás	MF					2				1				3			
23	(Hungary) Attila Katona	DF	5		1	1	2		1		1				8		2	1
23	(Hungary) Gábor Kocsis	DF	9		1		3				4		1		16		2	
24	(Hungary) Attila Horváth	MF	6				6		1		5				17		1	
25	(Hungary) Dávid Márton	DF	7		2		6	1	1		3				16	1	3	
26	(Hungary) Balázs Bartus	GK																
27	(Hungary) Árpád Gyarmati	MF									1				1			
28	(Hungary) Károly Graszl	DF	27	2	8	1	1				3		1		31	2	9	1
29	(Hungary) Alexisz Novák	DF	28	2	4		2				3		1		33	2	5	
31	(Hungary) Attila Bogdán	MF					1								1			
33	(Hungary) Martin Magyar	MF									1				1			
Own goals				1								1				2		
Totals				29	55	5		10	11			10	9			49	75	5

=== Hat-tricks ===
No.	Player	Against	Result	Date	Competition
17	(Japan) Kazuo Honma	Kecskemét (A)	3–2	14 May 2011	Nemzeti Bajnokság I

=== Clean sheets ===
			Clean sheets			
No.	Player	Games Played	Nemzeti Bajnokság I	Magyar Kupa	Ligakupa	Total
12	(Hungary) Péter Molnár	33	8		1	9
1	(Hungary) Pál Szalma	9		1	2	3
26	(Hungary) Balázs Bartus					
Totals			8	1	3	12
