= Tiago Ribeiro =

Tiago Ribeiro may refer to:

- Tiago Ribeiro (footballer, born 1992), Swiss football midfielder
- Tiago Ribeiro (footballer, born 2002), Portuguese football defensive midfielder

== See also ==
- Thiago Ribeiro (disambiguation)
