= SV Stegersbach =

- Full name: Sportverein Stegersbach
- Founded: 1929
- Ground: Stadion Stegersbach
- Capacity: 1,000
- Chairman: Karl Krammer
- Coach: Tihamér Lukács
- League: Austrian 2. Landesliga

SV Stegersbach is an Austrian association football club playing in the 5th tier Burgenland II Liga South for the 2024–25 season.

== Current squad ==
Note: Flags indicate national team as defined under FIFA eligibility rules; some limited exceptions apply. Players may hold more than one non-FIFA nationality.

No.	Pos.	Nation	Player
2	MF	AUT	Kevin Krammer
4	DF	AUT	Harald Huber
5	DF	AUT	Michael Daum
6	DF	AUT	David Hagenauer
7	FW	AUT	Paul Oswald
8	MF	AUT	Michael Thek
9	MF	AUT	Pfahnl Jürgen
10	FW	BRA	Pinheiro
11	DF	AUT	Ivan Barnjak

No.	Pos.	Nation	Player
12	FW	AUT	Lukas Haas
13	FW	CRO	Ivan Kovacec
14	MF	AUT	Philipp Wolf
15	DF	CRO	Ivica Zunic
16	MF	AUT	Franz Faszl
17	MF	AUT	Christoph Witamwas
18	MF	AUT	Erich Bencsics
21	GK	AUT	Manuel Haselbacher

== Staff ==
- Trainer: (Austria) Joachim Poandl
- Co-Trainer: (Austria) Siderits Helmut
- Goalkeeper coach: (Austria) Kreitzer Josef
- Physio: (Hungary) Attlila Fider
