= Thiago Ribeiro (disambiguation) =

Thiago Ribeiro is a Portuguese language name, may refer to:

- Thiago Ribeiro, (born 1986), full name Thiago Ribeiro Cardoso, Brazilian footballer who plays as a forward
- Thiago Ribeiro dos Santos, (born 1989), Brazilian footballer who plays as a forward
- Thiago Ribeiro da Silva, (born 1985), Brazilian footballer who plays as a midfielder
