= Győrszemere =

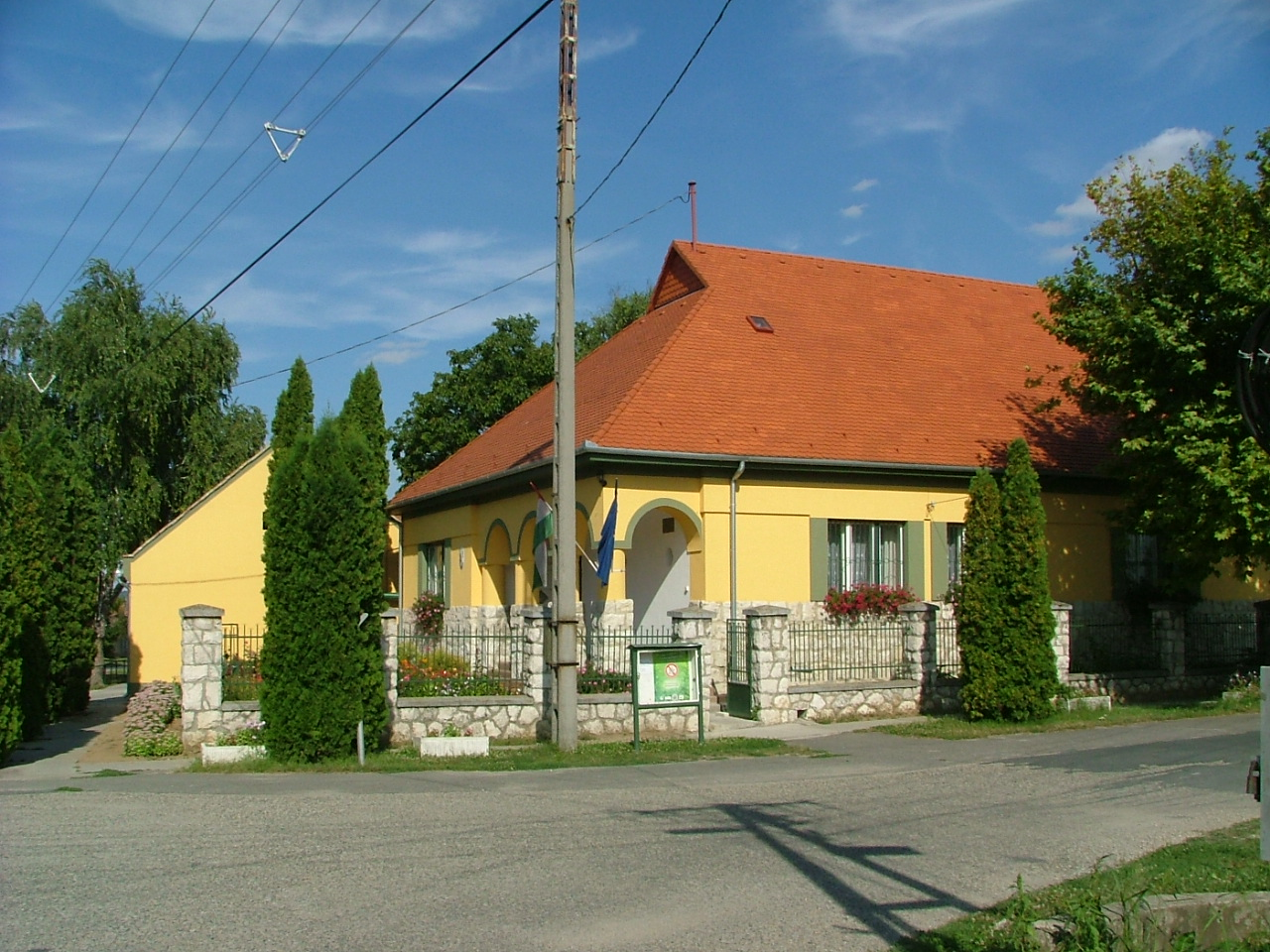
- Village hall

- Flag Coat of arms

- Location of Győr-Moson-Sopron county in Hungary

- Location of Győrszemere
- Coordinates: 47.55170°N 17.56328°E
- Country: Hungary
- County: Győr-Moson-Sopron

Area
  - Total: 33.11 km^{2} (12.78 sq mi)

Population (2004)
  - Total: 3,039
  - Density: 91.78/km^{2} (237.7/sq mi)
- Time zone: UTC+1 (CET)
  - Summer (DST): UTC+2 (CEST)
- Postal code: 9121
- Area code: 96

Győrszemere is a village in Győr-Moson-Sopron county, Hungary.
