= Mario Llanos =

Colombian footballer (born 1989)

Personal information
- Full name: Mario Llanos Méndez
- Date of birth: 5 April 1989 (age 37)
- Place of birth: Roldanillo, Colombia
- Height: 1.85 m (6 ft 1 in)
- Position: Defender

Senior career*
| Years | Team | Apps | (Gls) |
| 2008–2013 | Deportivo Pereira | 34 | (2) |
| 2010–2011 | → América de Cali (loan) | 14 | (0) |
| 2011 | → Santa Fe (loan) | 0 | (0) |
| 2012 | → Metz (loan) | 0 | (0) |
| 2013 | → Curicó Unido (loan) | 0 | (0) |
| 2013 | → Békéscsaba (loan) | 7 | (0) |
| 2016 | Tauro | 8 | (0) |
| 2017 | San Miguelito | 14 | (0) |
| 2017 | Alianza | 4 | (0) |
- * Club domestic league appearances and goals

Mario Llanos Méndez (born 5 April 1989) is a Colombian former professional footballer who played as a defender.

== Career ==
- (Colombia) Deportivo Pereira 2008–2010
- (Colombia) América de Cali 2010–2011
- (Colombia) Independiente Santa Fe 2011
- (Colombia) Deportivo Pereira 2012
- (France) Metz 2012
- (Chile) Curicó Unido 2013
- (Hungary) Békéscsaba 2013
- (Colombia) Deportivo Pereira 2013
- (Panama) Tauro 2016
- (Panama) Sporting San Miguelito 2017
- (Panama) Alianza 2017

== Honours ==
- (Colombia) América de Cali 2011 (Copa Cafam)
