= József Mogyorósi =

Hungarian footballer

Personal information
- Full name: József Mogyorósi
- Date of birth: 1 November 1978 (age 47)
- Place of birth: Budapest, Hungary
- Height: 1.83 m (6 ft 0 in)
- Position: Defender

Team information
- Current team: UFC Eferding

Senior career*
Years	Team	Apps	(Gls)
1997–1998	Ferencváros	1	(0)
1998–1999	Újpest	2	(0)
1999–2001	First Vienna	?	(?)
2001–2002	Csepel	51	(0)
2002–2004	Tatabánya	60	(0)
2004–2007	Diósgyőr	57	(0)
2007–2008	Honvéd	7	(0)
2008	Diósgyőr	12	(0)
2008–2013	Siófok	92	(1)
2013–2014	Kecskemét	26	(3)
2014–2015	Ajka	18	(0)
2015–2017	Siófok	53	(1)
2017–	UFC Eferding	?	(?)
- * Club domestic league appearances and goals as of 9 November 2017

József Mogyorósi (born 1 November 1978 in Budapest) is a Hungarian football (defender) player who currently plays for UFC Eferding in Austria.
