= Tihamér Lukács =

Romanian-born Hungarian footballer

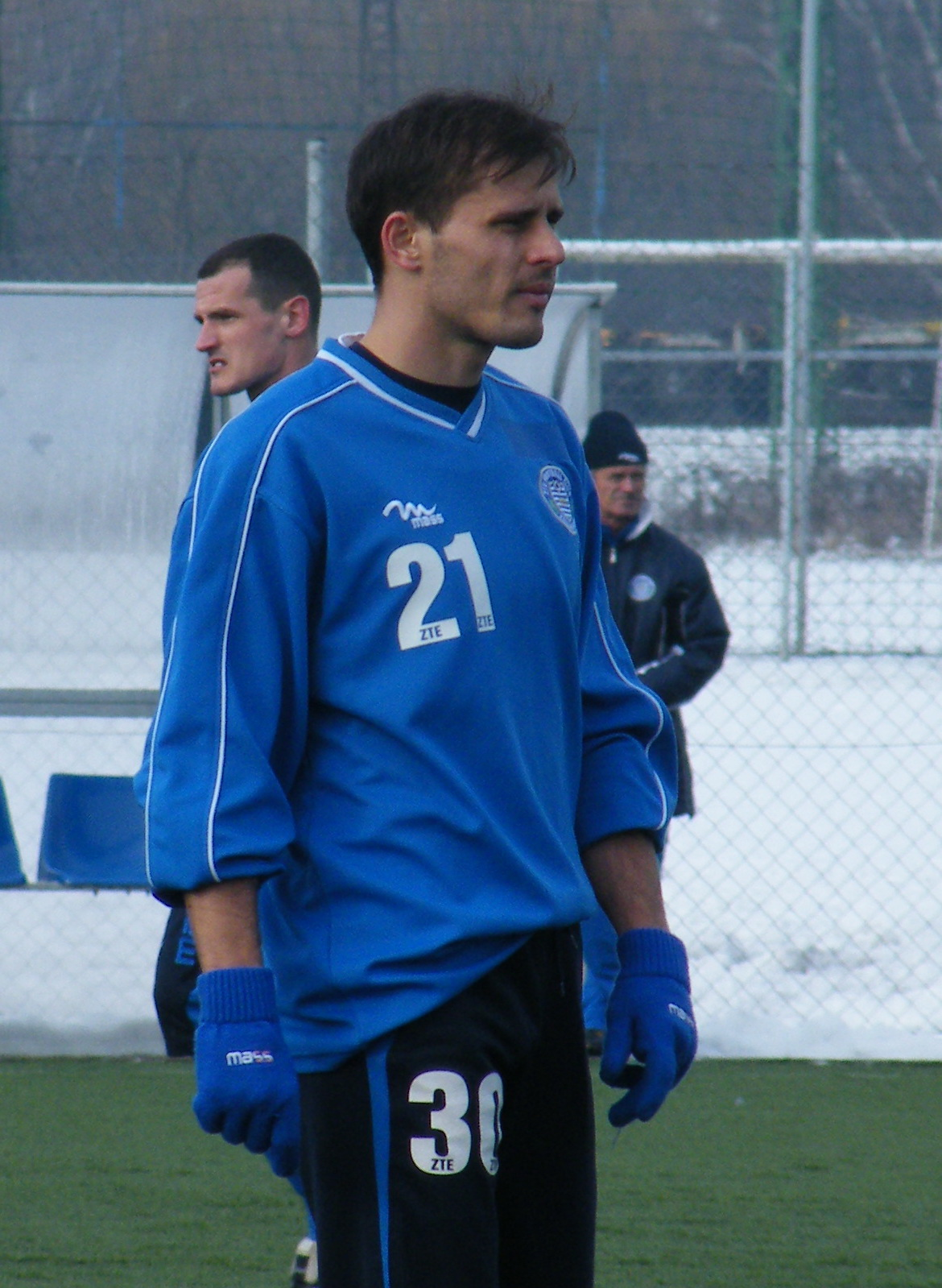

Personal information
- Date of birth: 18 July 1980 (age 46)
- Place of birth: Miercurea Ciuc, Romania
- Height: 1.80 m (5 ft 11 in)
- Position: Midfielder

Senior career*
Years	Team	Apps	(Gls)
1997–1998	Körmend FC		
1998–2002	Szombathelyi Haladás	7	(0)
1999–2000	→ Sárvár FC (loan)		
2000–2001	→ Büki TK (loan)		
2002–2003	Deutsch Tschantschendorf		
2003–2004	Estrela da Amadora		
2004–2005	C.F. União	13	(0)
2005–2006	SC Fortuna Köln		
2006–2007	Pécsi Mecsek FC	26	(4)
2007–2009	Zalaegerszegi TE	9	(0)
2008–2009	→ Vihren Sandanski (loan)	29	(4)
2009–2010	FC Nizhny Novgorod	7	(1)
2010–2011	BFC Siófok	24	(1)
2011–2017	SV Eberau		

Managerial career
- 2012–2013: SV Eberau (player-coach)
- 2019–2020: SV Stegersbach
- 2020–2021: SV Güssing
- * Club domestic league appearances and goals

Tihamér Lukács (born 18 July 1980) is a Romanian-born Hungarian football coach and a former player.

== Career ==
Tihamér started his career in little club Körmend, in 2000 signed with Szombathelyi Haladás. In June 2004 gone to Portugal and signed with União da Madeira. On next season, played in Pécsi Mecsek FC and after that wear equipment of Zalaegerszegi TE. In January 2008 he signed with the Bulgarian club FC Vihren Sandanski.
