= István Ludánszki =

Hungarian footballer

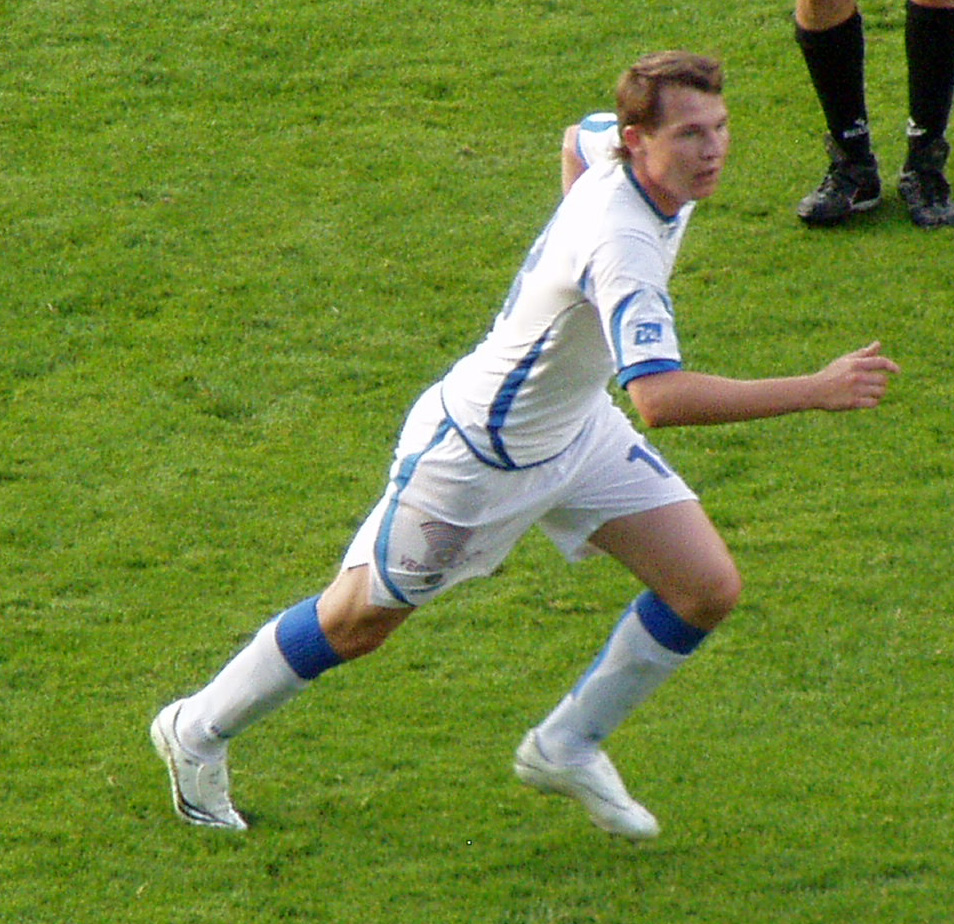
- Ludánszki István

Personal information
- Full name: István Ludánszki
- Date of birth: 27 July 1987 (age 39)
- Place of birth: Debrecen, Hungary
- Height: 1.84 m (6 ft 0 in)
- Position: Midfielder

Team information
- Current team: Tatabánya
- Number: 16

Youth career
- 1996–2004: Debrecen

Senior career*
Years	Team	Apps	(Gls)
2004–2006	Debrecen	0	(0)
2005–2006	→ Létavértes (loan)		
2006–2009	Zalaegerszeg	5	(1)
2007–2009	→ Integrál-DAC (loan)	42	(1)
2009–2011	Siófok	41	(1)
2011–2013	Balmazújváros	46	(2)
2013–	Tatabánya	14	(0)
- * Club domestic league appearances and goals as of 1 March 2014

István Ludánszki (born 27 July 1987, in Debrecen) is a Hungarian association football defender. He currently plays for Balmazújvárosi FC.
