= Attila Horváth (footballer, born 1988) =

Hungarian footballer

Personal information
- Date of birth: 30 December 1988 (age 37)
- Place of birth: Siófok, Hungary
- Height: 1.68 m (5 ft 6 in)
- Position: Midfielder

Team information
- Current team: Dabas–Gyón

Youth career
- 2002–2004: Diósgyőr
- 2004–2007: Siófok

Senior career*
Years	Team	Apps	(Gls)
2007–2013	Siófok	32	(0)
2012–2013	→ Ajka (loan)	43	(0)
2013–2014	Ajka	29	(0)
2014–2015	Zalaegerszeg	12	(0)
2015	Siófok	14	(0)
2015–2016	Ajka	28	(0)
2016–2018	Szeged-Csanád	62	(0)
2018–2020	Siófok	51	(0)
2020–2022	Tiszakécske	44	(1)
2022–	Dabas–Gyón	12	(0)
- * Club domestic league appearances and goals as of 4 May 2022

Attila Horváth (born 30 December 1988) is a Hungarian footballer who plays for Dabas–Gyón as a midfielder.
