= Tamás Kecskés =

Hungarian footballer

Personal information
- Date of birth: 15 January 1986 (age 40)
- Place of birth: Szentes, Hungary
- Height: 1.74 m (5 ft 8 1/2 in)
- Position: Midfielder

Youth career
- 2002–2004: MTK

Senior career*
| Years | Team | Apps | (Gls) |
| 2004–2010 | MTK | 40 | (1) |
| 2004–2007 | → Siófok (loan) | 39 | (8) |
| 2009–2010 | → Pécs (loan) | 18 | (3) |
| 2010–2013 | Siófok | 79 | (0) |
| 2013–2020 | Paks | 166 | (5) |
| 2020–2022 | Siófok | 30 | (0) |

International career
| 2002–2003 | Hungary U-17 | 5 | (0) |
| 2004–2005 | Hungary U-19 | 3 | (0) |
| 2007–2008 | Hungary U-21 | 1 | (0) |
- * Club domestic league appearances and goals

Tamás Kecskés (born 15 January 1986) is a Hungarian former football player.

== Career statistics ==
As of 14 March 2020

Appearances and goals by club, season and competition
| Club | Season | League | | | Cup | | League Cup | | Europe | | Total | |
| Club | Season | Division | Apps | Goals | Apps | Goals | Apps | Goals | Apps | Goals | Apps | Goals |
|---|---|---|---|---|---|---|---|---|---|---|---|---|
Siófok
| Siófok | 2004–05 | Nemzeti Bajnokság II | 13 | 3 | 2 | 0 | — | | — | | 15 | 3 |
| Siófok | 2006–07 | Nemzeti Bajnokság II | 26 | 5 | 0 | 0 | — | | — | | 26 | 5 |
| Siófok | 2010–11 | Nemzeti Bajnokság I | 24 | 0 | 1 | 0 | 4 | 1 | — | | 29 | 1 |
| Siófok | 2011–12 | Nemzeti Bajnokság I | 29 | 0 | 0 | 0 | 1 | 0 | — | | 30 | 0 |
| Siófok | 2012–13 | Nemzeti Bajnokság I | 26 | 0 | 3 | 0 | 2 | 0 | — | | 31 | 0 |
| Siófok | Total | | 118 | 8 | 6 | 0 | 7 | 1 | 0 | 0 | 131 | 9 |
MTK Budapest
| MTK Budapest | 2007–08 | Nemzeti Bajnokság I | 21 | 0 | 0 | 0 | 13 | 4 | — | | 35 | 4 |
| MTK Budapest | 2008–09 | Nemzeti Bajnokság I | 19 | 1 | 4 | 1 | 5 | 0 | 0 | 0 | 28 | 2 |
| MTK Budapest | Total | | 40 | 1 | 4 | 1 | 18 | 4 | 0 | 0 | 63 | 6 |
| Pécs | 2009–10 | Nemzeti Bajnokság II | 18 | 3 | 0 | 0 | — | | — | | 18 | 3 |
Paks
| Paks | 2013–14 | Nemzeti Bajnokság I | 28 | 0 | 1 | 0 | 4 | 2 | — | | 33 | 2 |
| Paks | 2014–15 | Nemzeti Bajnokság I | 28 | 2 | 1 | 0 | 3 | 2 | — | | 32 | 4 |
| Paks | 2015–16 | Nemzeti Bajnokság I | 23 | 1 | 2 | 0 | — | | — | | 25 | 1 |
| Paks | 2016–17 | Nemzeti Bajnokság I | 26 | 0 | 2 | 0 | — | | — | | 28 | 0 |
| Paks | 2017–18 | Nemzeti Bajnokság I | 20 | 0 | 5 | 0 | — | | — | | 25 | 0 |
| Paks | 2018–19 | Nemzeti Bajnokság I | 23 | 2 | 3 | 0 | — | | — | | 26 | 2 |
| Paks | 2019–20 | Nemzeti Bajnokság I | 18 | 0 | 6 | 2 | — | | — | | 24 | 2 |
| Paks | Total | | 166 | 5 | 20 | 2 | 7 | 4 | 0 | 0 | 193 | 11 |
| Career total | | | 342 | 17 | 30 | 3 | 32 | 8 | 0 | 0 | 405 | 28 |
