= Alexisz Novák =

Hungarian footballer

Personal information
- Full name: Alexisz Novák
- Date of birth: 22 November 1987 (age 38)
- Place of birth: Budapest, Hungary
- Height: 1.82 m (6 ft 0 in)
- Position: Defender

Team information
- Current team: Siófok
- Number: 29

Youth career
- 2002–2005: MTK

Senior career*
Years	Team	Apps	(Gls)
2005–2007	MTK	0	(0)
2005–2007	→ BKV Előre (loan)	47	(5)
2007–2008	Felcsút	4	(0)
2008–2009	Budaörs	23	(1)
2009–2013	Honvéd	12	(1)
2009–2013	Honvéd II	12	(3)
2010–2011	→ Siófok (loan)	28	(2)
2013–	Siófok	18	(1)
- * Club domestic league appearances and goals as of 9 March 2014

Alexisz Novák (born 22 November 1987) is a Hungarian professional footballer who plays for BFC Siófok and was born in Budapest.

== Career statistics ==
Appearances and goals by club, season and competition
Club	Season	League			Cup		League Cup		Europe		Total	
Club	Season	Division	Apps	Goals	Apps	Goals	Apps	Goals	Apps	Goals	Apps	Goals
BVK Előre	2005–06	Nemzeti Bajnokság II	22	1	0	0	0	0	0	0	22	1
BVK Előre	2006–07	Nemzeti Bajnokság II	25	4	0	0	0	0	0	0	25	4
BVK Előre	Total		47	5	0	0	0	0	0	0	47	5
Felcsút	2007–08	Nemzeti Bajnokság II	4	0	0	0	0	0	0	0	4	0
Budaörs	2007–08	Nemzeti Bajnokság II	12	1	0	0	0	0	0	0	12	1
Budaörs	2008–09	Nemzeti Bajnokság II	11	0	0	0	0	0	0	0	11	0
Budaörs	Total		23	1	0	0	0	0	0	0	23	1
Honvéd II	2009–10	Nemzeti Bajnokság II	12	3	0	0	1	0	0	0	13	3
Siófok	2010–11	Nemzeti Bajnokság I	28	2	2	0	3	0	0	0	33	2
Siófok	2013–14	Nemzeti Bajnokság II	18	1	1	0	0	0	0	0	19	1
Siófok	Total		46	3	3	0	3	0	0	0	52	3
Honvéd	2011–12	Nemzeti Bajnokság I	12	1	0	0	0	0	2	0	14	1
Career total			144	13	3	0	4	0	2	0	153	13

Updated to games played as of 9 March 2014.
