= Vilmos Melczer =

Hungarian footballer

Personal information
- Full name: Vilmos Melczer
- Date of birth: 25 February 1986 (age 40)
- Place of birth: Budapest, Hungary
- Height: 1.80 m (5 ft 11 in)
- Position: Midfielder

Team information
- Current team: Érd
- Number: 20

Youth career
- 2001–2003: MTK

Senior career*
Years	Team	Apps	(Gls)
2003–2010	MTK	29	(1)
2004–2005	→ Siófok (loan)	23	(1)
2005–2006	→ Soroksár (loan)	27	(3)
2006–2007	→ Siófok (loan)	51	(10)
2010–2011	Budaörs	13	(2)
2011–2013	Siófok	64	(15)
2013–2014	Mezőkövesd	21	(5)
2014–2015	Zalaegerszeg	7	(1)
2015–2016	Dunaújváros	10	(2)
2016	Ajka	4	(2)
2016–	Érd	18	(11)

International career
2002–2003	Hungary U-17	1	(0)
2004–2005	Hungary U-19	5	(0)
2007–2008	Hungary U-21	1	(0)
- * Club domestic league appearances and goals as of 10 February 2017

Vilmos Melczer (born 25 February 1986 in Budapest) is a Hungarian football player who currently plays for Érdi VSE.
