= Péter Molnár (footballer) =

Hungarian footballer

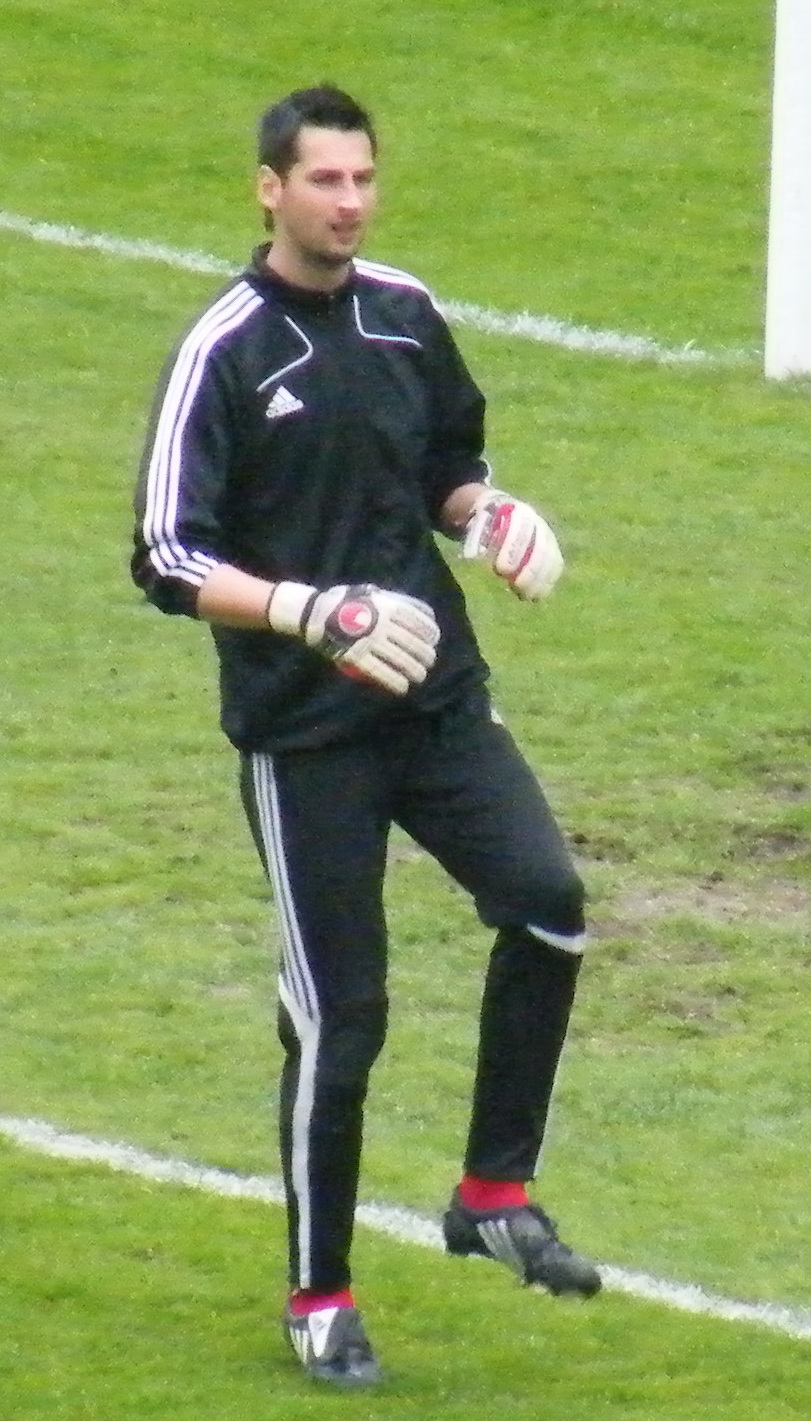

Personal information
- Date of birth: 14 December 1983 (age 42)
- Place of birth: Komárno, Czechoslovakia
- Height: 1.95 m (6 ft 5 in)
- Position: Goalkeeper

Team information
- Current team: Puskás Akadémia II (gk coach)

Youth career
- Komárno

Senior career*
Years	Team	Apps	(Gls)
2001–2006	Komárno		
2006–2013	Győr II	71	(0)
2006–2013	Győr	3	(0)
2010–2011	→ Siófok (loan)	30	(0)
2013–2018	Paks	100	(0)
2018–2020	Siófok	36	(0)
2020–2021	Puskás Akadémia II	11	(0)

Managerial career
- 2021–: Puskás Akadémia II (gk coach)
- * Club domestic league appearances and goals

Péter Molnár (born 14 December 1983) is a retired ethnic Hungarian football player.

== Career statistics ==
Appearances and goals by club, season and competition
Club	Season	League			Cup		League Cup		Europe		Total	
Club	Season	Division	Apps	Goals	Apps	Goals	Apps	Goals	Apps	Goals	Apps	Goals
Győr
Győr	2007–08	Nemzeti Bajnokság I	0	0	0	0	8	0	—		8	0
Győr	2008–09	Nemzeti Bajnokság I	1	0	0	0	6	0	0	0	7	0
Győr	2009–10	Nemzeti Bajnokság I	1	0	1	0	5	0	0	0	7	0
Győr	2011–12	Nemzeti Bajnokság I	0	0	5	0	6	0	0	0	11	0
Győr	2012–13	Nemzeti Bajnokság I	1	0	5	0	5	0	0	0	11	0
Győr	Total		3	0	11	0	31	0	0	0	45	0
Győr II
Győr II	2007–08	Nemzeti Bajnokság III	23	0	—		—		—		23	0
Győr II	2008–09	Nemzeti Bajnokság II	22	0	—		—		—		22	0
Győr II	2009–10	Nemzeti Bajnokság II	9	0	—		—		—		9	0
Győr II	2011–12	Nemzeti Bajnokság II	9	0	—		—		—		9	0
Győr II	2012–13	Nemzeti Bajnokság II	8	0	—		—		—		8	0
Győr II	Total		71	0	0	0	0	0	0	0	71	0
Sopron	2014–15	Nemzeti Bajnokság I	24	1	0	0	5	1	—		29	2
Siófok	2010–11	Nemzeti Bajnokság I	30	0	2	0	1	0	—		33	0
Paks
Paks	2013–14	Nemzeti Bajnokság I	23	0	0	0	4	0	—		27	0
Paks	2014–15	Nemzeti Bajnokság I	30	0	0	0	0	0	—		30	0
Paks	2015–16	Nemzeti Bajnokság I	26	0	0	0	—		—		26	0
Paks	2016–17	Nemzeti Bajnokság I	15	0	0	0	—		—		15	0
Paks	2017–18	Nemzeti Bajnokság I	6	0	3	0	—		—		9	0
Paks	Total		100	0	0	0	4	0	0	0	104	0
Career total			204	0	13	0	36	0	0	0	253	0

Updated to games played as of 9 December 2017.
