= Thiago Ribeiro (footballer, born 1985) =

Brazilian footballer

Thiago
Personal information
- Full name: Thiago Vasconcelos Ribeiro Da Silva
- Date of birth: 23 January 1985 (age 41)
- Place of birth: Rio de Janeiro, Brazil
- Height: 1.76 m (5 ft 9 in)
- Position: Midfielder

Team information
- Current team: Guabirá
- Number: 77

Senior career*
Years	Team	Apps	(Gls)
2005–2009	Juventus		
2009–2011	Siófok	12	(0)
2011	→ Barcs (loan)	13	(4)
2011–2013	Veszprém	47	(14)
2013–2015	Dunaújváros	49	(4)
2016–2017	Real América		
2018–2021	Royal Pari	120	(6)
2022–2023	Real Tomayapo	66	(0)
2024	Royal Pari	32	(0)
2025–	Guabirá	28	(0)
- * Club domestic league appearances and goals as of 30 December 2025

Thiago Vasconcelos Ribeiro Da Silva (born 23 January 1985 in Rio de Janeiro) is a Brazilian professional footballer who plays as a midfielder for Bolivian Primera División club Guabirá.

== Club statistics ==
Club	Season	League		Cup		League Cup		Europe		Total	
Club	Season	Apps	Goals	Apps	Goals	Apps	Goals	Apps	Goals	Apps	Goals
Siófok
Siófok	2009–10	26	1	1	0	0	0	0	0	27	1
Siófok	2010–11	12	0	2	2	2	1	0	0	16	3
Siófok	Total	38	1	3	2	2	1	0	0	43	5
Barcs
Barcs	2010–11	13	4	0	0	0	0	0	0	13	4
Barcs	Total	13	4	0	0	0	0	0	0	13	4
Veszprém
Veszprém	2011–12	28	9	2	0	0	0	0	0	30	9
Veszprém	2012–13	19	5	0	0	0	0	0	0	19	5
Veszprém	Total	47	14	2	0	0	0	0	0	49	14
Dunaújváros
Dunaújváros	2013–14	29	4	6	0	4	0	0	0	39	4
Dunaújváros	2014–15	11	0	0	0	6	1	0	0	17	1
Dunaújváros	Total	40	4	6	0	10	1	0	0	56	5
Career Total		138	23	11	2	12	2	0	0	161	27

Updated to games played as of 9 December 2014.
