= 2010–11 Lombard-Pápa TFC season =

Lombard-Pápa TFC
2010–11 season
- Chairman: Péter Bíró
- Manager: György Véber
- NB 1: 12.
- Hungarian Cup: 4. round
- Hungarian League Cup: Group Stage

The 2010–11 season will be Lombard-Pápa TFC's 4th competitive season, 2nd consecutive season in the Soproni Liga and 15th year in existence as a football club.

== Team kit ==
The team kits for the 2010–11 season are produced by Jako and sponsored by Lombard. The home kit is yellow and black colour and the away kit is blue and black colour.

Home	Away

== Club ==
=== Coaching staff ===
Position	Staff
Manager	(Hungary) György Véber
Goalkeeping coach	(Hungary) László Kovács
Club doctor	(Hungary) Dr. András Ferenczy
Masseur	(Hungary) László Takács
(Hungary) Béláné Györkös

Last updated: 4 August 2010

=== Other information ===
General Manager	(Hungary) Péter Bíró
Club Manager	(Hungary) Gábor Árki
Club Director	(Hungary) György Szemán
Technical Leader	(Hungary) Lajos Glatz
Administrator	(Hungary) Gyöngyi Vémi Glatzné
Ground (capacity and dimensions)	Stadion Várkerti (5,500 / 110x68 meters)

Updated to match played 4 August 2010

== Transfers ==
=== Summer ===
In: Note: Flags indicate national team as defined under FIFA eligibility rules; some limited exceptions apply. Players may hold more than one non-FIFA nationality.

No.	Pos.	Nation	Player
7	FW	HUN	Tamás German (loan return from (Netherlands) Emmen)
11	MF	HUN	Péter Takács (from (Hungary) Diósgyőri VTK)
24	DF	HUN	Péter Bíró (from (Hungary) Debreceni VSC)
26	DF	BIH	Zoran Šupić (on loan from (Hungary) Győri ETO FC)
40	MF	HUN	Norbert Tóth (from (Hungary) Újpest FC)
—	DF	HUN	Attila Császár (loan return from (Hungary) Ajka FC)

Out: Note: Flags indicate national team as defined under FIFA eligibility rules; some limited exceptions apply. Players may hold more than one non-FIFA nationality.

No.	Pos.	Nation	Player
7	MF	HUN	Balázs Sarus (released)
16	DF	HUN	Attila Császár (released)
26	DF	HUN	Tamás Sipos (to (Hungary) Bőcs KSC)

== Teams ==
=== First team squad ===
As of 20 November 2010

Note: Flags indicate national team as defined under FIFA eligibility rules; some limited exceptions apply. Players may hold more than one non-FIFA nationality.

No.	Pos.	Nation	Player
4	MF	HUN	Gábor Tóth
5	DF	HUN	András Dlusztus
6	MF	HUN	Balázs Venczel
7	FW	HUN	Tamás Germán
8	MF	HUN	Norbert Heffler
10	MF	NGA	David Solomon Abwo
11	MF	HUN	Péter Takács
12	FW	HUN	Zoltán Jovánczai
13	MF	HUN	Gábor Gyömbér
14	DF	HUN	Attila Rajnay
15	MF	LVA	Vadims Žuļevs
17	FW	UKR	Denys Rebryk

No.	Pos.	Nation	Player
19	MF	HUN	Zsolt Bárányos
20	MF	HUN	Norbert Tóth
21	FW	SRB	Goran Marić
23	DF	HUN	Attila Farkas
24	DF	HUN	Péter Bíró
26	DF	BIH	Zoran Šupić (on loan from Győri ETO)
27	GK	HUN	Lajos Szűcs
29	FW	HUN	Milán Németh
30	DF	COL	Cesar Quintero
39	FW	HUN	Péter Bali
64	FW	HUN	Dávid Palkó

== Statistics ==
=== Appearances and goals ===
Last updated on 20 November 2010.

No.	Pos	Nat	Player	Total		NB 1		Hungarian Cup		League Cup	
No.	Pos	Nat	Player	Apps	Goals	Apps	Goals	Apps	Goals	Apps	Goals
4	MF	(Hungary) HUN	Gábor Tóth	7	0	6	0	1	0	0	0
5	DF	(Hungary) HUN	András Dlusztus	3	0	1	0	2	0	0	0
6	MF	(Hungary) HUN	Balázs Venczel	6	0	6	0	0	0	0	0
7	FW	(Hungary) HUN	Tamás Germán	4	1	4	1	0	0	0	0
8	MF	(Hungary) HUN	Norbert Heffler	14	4	12	4	2	0	0	0
10	FW	(Nigeria) NGA	David Solomon Abwo	16	4	15	4	1	0	0	0
11	MF	(Hungary) HUN	Péter Takács	13	2	11	2	2	0	0	0
12	FW	(Hungary) HUN	Zoltán Jovánczai	6	0	5	0	1	0	0	0
13	MF	(Hungary) HUN	Gábor Gyömbér	16	2	14	2	2	0	0	0
14	DF	(Hungary) HUN	Attila Rajnay	5	0	5	0	0	0	0	0
15	MF	(Latvia) LVA	Vadims Žuļevs	5	0	3	0	2	0	0	0
17	FW	(Ukraine) UKR	Denys Rebryk	16	2	14	1	2	1	0	0
19	MF	(Hungary) HUN	Zsolt Bárányos	17	4	15	3	2	1	0	0
20	MF	(Hungary) HUN	Norbert Tóth	10	0	10	0	0	0	0	0
21	FW	(Serbia) SRB	Goran Marić	15	6	13	6	2	0	0	0
23	DF	(Hungary) HUN	Attila Farkas	15	0	15	0	0	0	0	0
24	DF	(Hungary) HUN	Péter Bíró	8	0	8	0	0	0	0	0
26	DF	(Bosnia and Herzegovina) BIH	Zoran Šupić	8	0	7	0	1	0	0	0
27	GK	(Hungary) HUN	Lajos Szűcs	17	-29	15	-27	2	-2	0	0
29	FW	(Hungary) HUN	Milán Németh	12	0	10	0	2	0	0	0
30	DF	(Colombia) COL	Cesar Quintero	16	1	14	0	2	1	0	0
35	MF	(Hungary) HUN	Balázs Karácsony	1	0	0	0	1	0	0	0
39	FW	(Hungary) HUN	Péter Bali	3	0	2	0	1	0	0	0
64	FW	(Hungary) HUN	Dávid Palkó	1	0	1	0	0	0	0	0

=== Top scorers ===
Includes all competitive matches. The list is sorted by shirt number when total goals are equal.

Last updated on 20 November 2010

Position	Nation	Number	Name	Soproni Liga	Hungarian Cup	League Cup	Total
1	(Serbia)	21	Goran Marić	6	0	0	6
2	(Hungary)	8	Norbert Heffler	4	0	0	4
3	(Nigeria)	10	David Solomon Abwo	4	0	0	4
4	(Hungary)	19	Zsolt Bárányos	3	1	0	4
5	(Hungary)	13	Gábor Gyömbér	2	0	0	2
6	(Hungary)	11	Péter Takács	2	0	0	2
7	(Ukraine)	17	Denys Rebryk	1	1	0	2
8	(Hungary)	7	Tamás Germán	1	0	0	1
9	(Colombia)	30	Cesar Quintero	0	1	0	1
/	/	/	Own Goals	2	0	0	2
			TOTALS	25	3	0	28

=== Disciplinary record ===
Includes all competitive matches. Players with 1 card or more included only.

Last updated on 20 November 2010

Position	Nation	Number	Name	Soproni Liga		Hungarian Cup		League Cup		Total (Hu Total)	
Position	Nation	Number	Name	Booked	Sent off (straight red)	Booked	Sent off (straight red)	Booked	Sent off (straight red)	Booked	Sent off (straight red)
MF	(Hungary)	4	Gábor Tóth	0	0	1	0	0	0	1 (0)	0 (0)
DF	(Hungary)	5	András Dlusztus	1	0	0	1	0	0	1 (1)	1 (0)
MF	(Hungary)	8	Norbert Heffler	2	0	0	0	0	0	2 (2)	0 (0)
MF	(Hungary)	11	Péter Takács	1	1	0	0	0	0	1 (1)	1 (1)
FW	(Hungary)	12	Zoltán Jovánczai	0	0	1	0	0	0	1 (0)	0 (0)
MF	(Hungary)	13	Gábor Gyömbér	2	0	0	0	0	0	2 (2)	0 (0)
DF	(Hungary)	14	Attila Rajnay	4	0	0	0	0	0	4 (4)	0 (0)
FW	(Ukraine)	17	Denys Rebryk	3	0	1	0	0	0	4 (3)	0 (0)
MF	(Hungary)	19	Zsolt Bárányos	3	0	1	0	0	0	4 (3)	0 (0)
MF	(Hungary)	20	Norbert Tóth	3	0	0	0	0	0	3 (3)	0 (0)
FW	(Serbia)	21	Goran Marić	2	0	1	0	0	0	3 (2)	0 (0)
DF	(Hungary)	23	Attila Farkas	4	0	0	0	0	0	4 (4)	0 (0)
DF	(Bosnia and Herzegovina)	26	Zoran Šupić	1	0	0	1	0	0	1 (1)	1 (0)
GK	(Hungary)	27	Lajos Szűcs	1	0	0	0	0	0	1 (1)	0 (0)
FW	(Hungary)	29	Milán Németh	1	0	1	0	0	0	2 (1)	0 (0)
DF	(Colombia)	30	Cesar Quintero	1	0	0	0	0	0	1 (1)	0 (0)
MF	(Hungary)	35	Balázs Karácsony	0	0	1	0	0	0	1 (0)	0 (0)
			TOTALS	29	1	7	2	0	0	36 (29)	3 (1)

=== Overall ===
Games played	17 (15 Soproni Liga, 2 Hungarian Cup and 0 Hungarian League Cup)
Games won	8 (7 Soproni Liga, 1 Hungarian Cup and 0 Hungarian League Cup)
Games drawn	2 (1 Soproni Liga, 1 Hungarian Cup and 0 Hungarian League Cup)
Games lost	7 (7 Soproni Liga, 0 Hungarian Cup and 0 Hungarian League Cup)
Goals scored	28
Goals conceded	29
Goal difference	−1
Yellow cards	36
Red cards	3
Worst discipline	(Hungary) Attila Rajnay (4 (yellow card) , 0 (red card) )
Worst discipline	(Hungary) Attila Farkas (4 (yellow card) , 0 (red card) )
Worst discipline	(Ukraine) Denys Rebryk (4 (yellow card) , 0 (red card) )
Worst discipline	(Hungary) Zsolt Bárányos (4 (yellow card) , 0 (red card) )
Best result	5–1 (H) v Szombathelyi Haladás – Nemzeti Bajnokság I – 20–08–2010
Worst result	0–5 (H) v Ferencvárosi TC – Nemzeti Bajnokság I – 20–11–2010
Most appearances	(Hungary) Lajos Szűcs (17 appearances)
Most appearances	(Hungary) Zsolt Bárányos (17 appearances)
Top scorer	(Serbia) Goran Marić (6 goals)
Points	26/51 (50.98%)

Last updated: 20 November 2010

== Nemzeti Bajnokság I ==
=== Classification ===
Pos	Team	Pld	W	D	L	GF	GA	GD	Pts	Qualification or relegation
11	Vasas	30	11	7	12	34	46	−12	40	
12	Kecskemét	30	11	3	16	51	56	−5	36	Qualification for Europa League second qualifying round (Note: Kecskemét have qualified for the second qualifying round of the 2011–12 UEFA Europa League after winning the 2010–11 Hungarian Cup.)
13	Pápa	30	10	5	15	39	52	−13	35	
14	Siófok	30	8	10	12	29	41	−12	34	
15	MTK (R)	30	8	6	16	35	49	−14	30	Relegation to Nemzeti Bajnokság II

Source: soccerway.com
Rules for classification: 1st points; 2nd overall wins; 3rd goal difference; 4th goals scored
(R) Relegated

=== Results summary ===
Overall								Home						Away					
Pld	W	D	L	GF	GA	GD	Pts	W	D	L	GF	GA	GD	W	D	L	GF	GA	GD
15	7	1	7	25	27	−2	22	4	1	2	15	11	+4	3	0	5	10	16	−6

Last updated: 20 November 2010.
Source: NB1

=== Results by round ===
Round	1	2	3	4	5	6	7	8	9	10	11	12	13	14	15	16	17	18	19	20	21	22	23	24	25	26	27	28	29	30
Ground	A	H	A	H	A	A	H	A	H	A	H	A	H	A	H	H	A	H	A	H	H	A	H	A	H	A	H	A	H	A
Result	L	D	L	W	L	L	W	W	L	W	W	W	W	L	L															
Position	16	14	15	12	13	14	12	11	12	10	8	8	4	7	7															

Updated to match(es) played on 20 November 2010. Source: Matches
A = Away; H = Home; W = Win; D = Draw; L = Loss

=== Matches ===
31 July 2010
17:30 CEST

Debreceni VSC	2–0 (2–0)	Lombard-Pápa TFC
P. Szilágyi 18'; T. Kulcsár 32'	(Report)	Rajnay (yellow card) 64'; A. Farkas (yellow card) 82'

Stadion Oláh Gábor Út, Debrecen
Attendance: 3,000
Referee: Mihály Fábián
- Debreceni VSC: Verpecz – Z. Nagy, Simac, I. Szűcs, Korhut – Bódi, Ramos, Rezes (Czvitkovics 61.), T. Kulcsár (Dombi 56.) – Kabát (B. Farkas 56.), P. Szilágyi. Coach: András Herczeg.
- Lombard-Pápa TFC: L. Szűcs – G. Tóth, A. Farkas, Supic (P. Bíró 33.), Rajnay – Zulevs, Gyömbér, Bárányos (Jovánczai 46.), N. Heffler (Germán 59.), N. Tóth – Abwo. Coach: György Véber.
- G.: P. Szilágyi (18.), T. Kulcsár (32.)
- Y.: Rajnay (64.), A. Farkas (82.)

7 August 2010
19:00 CEST

Lombard-Pápa TFC	0–0 (0–0)	Szolnoki MÁV FC
N. Tóth (yellow card) 49'	(Report)	Cornaci (yellow card) 40'; Hegedűs (yellow card) 61'; Búrány (yellow card) 80'; Ngalle (yellow card) 85'

Stadion Várkerti, Pápa
Attendance: 1,500
Referee: Roland Veizer
- Lombard-Pápa TFC: Szűcs – Venczel (Rebryk 56.), G. Tóth, Farkas, Rajnay – Quintero, Gyömbér, Heffler – Abwo (Germán 62.), Bárányos (Jovánczai 80.), N. Tóth. Coach: György Véber.
- Szolnoki MÁV FC: Tarczy – Hevesi-Tóth, Hegedűs, Pető, Cornaci – Tchami (Vörös 73.), Molnár, Remili (Antal 80.), Búrány, Koós (Ngalle 65.) – Alex. Coach: Attila Vágó.
- G.: —
- Y.: N. Tóth (49.) – Cornaci (40.), Hegedűs (61.), Búrány (80.), Ngalle (85.)

1 September 2010
19:00 CEST

Zalaegerszegi TE	3–1 (2–1)	Lombard-Pápa TFC
Rajcomar 26'; Pavičević 42' (yellow card) 84' (goal) 90' (pen.)	(Report)	Dlusztus (yellow card) 10'; Abwo 12'; Quintero (yellow card) 60'; Rebryk (yellow card) 75'

ZTE Arena, Zalaegerszeg
Attendance: 3,000
Referee: Roland Veizer
- Zalaegerszegi TE: Vlaszák – Panikvar, Kovács (Kocsárdi 61.), Bogunovic, Varga – Szalai, Kamber, Máté, Illés (A. Horváth 65.) – Rajcomar (Delic 84.), Pavicevic. Coach: János Csank.
- Lombard-Pápa TFC: Szűcs – Venczel (Rebryk 57.), Dlusztus, Bíró, Németh – Quintero, Farkas, Germán – Abwo, Bárányos, Maric. Coach: György Véber.
- G.: Rajcomar (26.), Pavicevic (42., 90. – pen.) – Abwo (12.)
- Y.: Pavicevic (84.) – Dlusztus (10.), Quintero (60.), Rebryk (75.)

20 August 2010
19:00 CEST

Lombard-Pápa TFC	5–1 (1–1)	Szombathelyi Haladás
Rajnay (yellow card) 25'; Bárányos 32' (pen.); Marić 50' 88'; Rebryk (yellow card) 74'; Germán 81'; Gyömbér 84' (pen.)	(Report)	Á. Simon (yellow card) 17'; Tóth 22'; Lengyel (yellow card) 34'; Rajos (yellow card) 50'; Nagy (red card) 56'; Molnár (red card) 57'; Lattenstein (red card) 68'

Stadion Várkerti, Pápa
Attendance: 2,000
Referee: Alvaro Miquel Garcia
- Lombard-Pápa TFC: Szűcs – Takács (Rebryk 72.), Bíró, Farkas, Rajnay (Venczel 58.) – Quintero, Gyömbér, Heffler – Abwo (Germán 79.), Bárányos, Maric. Coach: György Véber.
- Szombathelyi Haladás: Rózsa – Schimmer, Guzmics, Lengyel, Tóth (Csontos 84.) – Rajos, Molnár, Á. Simon – Nagy, Kenesei (Lattenstein 62.), Oross (Rácz 84.). Coach: Aurél Csertői.
- G.: Bárányos (32. – pen), Maric (50., 88.), Germán (81.), Gyömbér (84. – pen) – Tóth (22.)
- Y.: Rajnay (25.), Rebryk (74.) – Á. Simon (17.), Lengyel (34.), Rajos (50.)
- R.: Nagy (56.), Molnár (57.), Lattenstein (68.)

28 August 2010
19:00 CEST

Kaposvári Rákóczi FC	3–2 (0–1)	Lombard-Pápa TFC
Grúz (yellow card) 50' (goal) 84'; Kulcsár (yellow card) 68' (goal) 87'; Zsók 90+2'	(Report)	Bárányos (yellow card) 32'; Abwo 36'; P. Takács 79' (red card) 83'

Stadion Kaposvár Rákoczi, Kaposvár
Attendance: 2,000
Referee: János Takács
- Kaposvári Rákóczi FC: Kovács – Okuka, Grúz, Zsók, Gujic – Godslove (Pavlovic 50.), Balázs (Kulcsár 50.), Lipusz, Hegedűs, Oláh – Peric (Szepessy 87.). Coach: Tibor Sisa.
- Lombard-Pápa TFC: Szűcs – Quintero (Zulevs 71.), Bíró, Farkas, P. Takács – Németh, Gyömbér, Jovánczai (Rebryk 62.) – Abwo, Bárányos, Maric (Venczel 83.). Coach: György Véber.
- G.: Grúz (84.), Kulcsár (87.), Zsók (92.) – Abwo (36.), P. Takács (79.)
- Y.: Grúz (50.), Kulcsár (68.) – Bárányos (32.)
- R.: P. Takács (83.)

9 October 2010
19:00 CEST

Paksi SE	4–0 (1–0)	Lombard-Pápa TFC
Bartha 43' 87'; Vayer 49'; Montvai 68'	(Report)	Rajnay (yellow card) 26'; Rebryk (yellow card) 88'

Stadion PSE, Paks
Attendance: 500
Referee: Viktor Kassai
- Paksi SE: Csernyánszki – Sifter, Fiola, Éger (Böde 71.), Csehi – Heffler, Kiss (Mészáros 86.), Sipeki – Bartha (Báló 89.), Montvai, Vayer.. Coach: Károly Kis.
- Lombard-Pápa TFC: Szűcs – Rajnay, Bíró, Farkas, Takács – Quintero (Rebryk 51.), Gyömbér, Heffler – Abwo, Bárányos, Maric (Bali 80.). Coach: György Véber.
- G.: Bartha (43., 87.), Vayer (49.), Montvai (68.)
- Y.: Rajnay (26.), Rebryk (88.)

18 September 2010
19:00 CEST

Lombard-Pápa TFC	4–1 (3–1)	Kecskeméti TE
Gyömbér 8' (yellow card) 30'; Takács 13'; Rebryk 40'; Heffler (yellow card) 72' (goal) 90+8'	(Report)	Gyagya (yellow card) 10' (goal) 11'; Holczer (yellow card) 40'; Bori (yellow card) 43'; Lambulić (yellow card) 45'; Koncz (yellow card) 63'

Stadion Várkerti, Pápa
Attendance: 1,000
Referee: Zoltán Iványi
- Lombard-Pápa TFC: Szűcs – Takács (Venczel 90.+9), Farkas, Bíró, Németh – Quintero, Gyömbér, Heffler – Abwo (Rebryk 33.), Bárányos, Maric (Jovánczai 90.+2). Coach: György Véber.
- Kecskeméti TE – Ereco: Holczer – Bori, Gyagya, Lambulic, Balogh (Mohl 55.) – Ebala, Cukic, Koncz (Savic 72.), Alempijevic (Csordás 46.) – Litsingi, Tököli. Coach: István Urbányi.
- G.: Gyömbér (8.), Takács (13.), Rebryk (40.), Heffler (90.+8) – Gyagya (11.)
- Y.: Gyömbér (30.), Heffler (72.) – Holczer (40.), Bori (43.), Lambulic (45.), Koncz (63.)

25 September 2010
18:00 CEST

Budapest Honvéd FC	2–4 (1–2)	Lombard-Pápa TFC
Abass 26' 61'; Takács (yellow card) 60'; Cuerda (yellow card) 90' (yellow-red card) 90+2'	(Report)	Marić 7'; Bárányos 22' 57'; Farkas (yellow card) 51'; Heffler (yellow card) 60' (goal) 72'

Bozsik Stadion, Budapest
Attendance: 0
Referee: Ádám Farkas
- Budapest Honvéd FC: Kemenes – Takács, Cuerda, Debreceni, Hajdú – Abass, Coira, Akassou (Conteh 77.), Sadjo (Rufino 65.) – Rouani, Danilo. Coach: Massimo Morales.
- Lombard-Pápa TFC: Szűcs – Takács, Bíró, Farkas, Németh – Quintero, Gyömbér, Bárányos – Abwo (Rebryk 65.), Heffler (Venczel 92.), Maric. Coach: György Véber.
- G.: Abass (26., 61.) – Maric (7.), Bárányos (22., 57.), Heffler (72.)
- Y.: Takács (60.), Cuerda (90.) – Farkas (51.), Heffler (60.)
- R.: Cuerda (92.)

1 October 2010
17:00 CEST

Lombard-Pápa TFC	1–2 (0–2)	Videoton FC Fehérvár
Rajnay (yellow card) 27'; Marić (yellow card) 55'; Heffler 55'; Tóth (yellow card) 85'; Szűcs (yellow card) 90+2'	(Report)	Elek 18' (red card) 90+2'; Alves 45'; Božović (yellow card) 55'; Lipták (yellow card) 64'; Nagy (yellow card) 86'; Vaskó (yellow card) 87'

Stadion Várkerti, Pápa
Attendance: 2,000
Referee: János Takács
- Lombard-Pápa TFC: Szűcs – Takács, Bíró (Bali 84.), Farkas, Rajnay (Tóth 64.) – Quintero (Rebryk 46.), Gyömbér, Bárányos – Abwo, Maric, Heffler. Coach: György Véber.
- Videoton FC Fehérvár: Bozovic – Lázár (Vasiljevic 46.), Lipták, Vaskó, Andic – Nagy, Farkas, Sándor, Elek, Polonkai (Milanovic 91.) – Alves (Djordjic 94.). Coach: György Mezey.
- G.: Heffler (55.) – Elek (18.), Alves (45.)
- Y.: Rajnay (27.), Maric (55.), Tóth (85.), Szűcs (92.) – Bozovic (55.), Lipták (64.), Nagy (86.), Vaskó (87.)
- R.: Elek (92.)

15 October 2010
17:00 CEST

Győri ETO FC	0–1 (0–0)	Lombard-Pápa TFC
Trajković (yellow card) 8'; Đorđević (yellow card) 64' (yellow-red card) 79'	(Report)	Marić (yellow card) 38'; Farkas (yellow card) 44'; Abwo 81'

ETO Park, Győr
Attendance: 2,000
Referee: József Berger
- Győri ETO FC: Stevanovic – Tokody (Fehér 29.), Djordjevic, Stanisic, Szabó – Koltai, Trajkovic (Ganugrava 62.), Pilibaitis, Völgyi (Ceolin 61.) – Bouguerra, Aleksidze. Coach: Attila Pintér.
- Lombard-Pápa TFC: Szűcs – Takács, Supic, Farkas, Németh – Rebryk (Quintero 87.), Gyömbér, Bárányos. Zulevs (Abwo 57.) – Maric, Heffler (Tóth 92.). Coach: György Véber.
- G.: Abwo (81.)
- Y.: Trajkovic (8.), Djordjevic (64.) – Maric (38.), Farkas (44.)
- R:: Djordjevic (79.)

23 October 2010
17:30 CEST

Lombard-Pápa TFC	3–1 (1–0)	Újpest FC
Vermes 4' (o.g.); Šupić (yellow card) 43'; Marić 69'; Gyömbér (yellow card) 75'; Heffler 81'	(Report)	Tisza 72'; Takács (yellow card) 77'; Barczi (yellow card) 84'

Stadion Várkerti, Pápa
Attendance: 3,500
Referee: Viktor Kassai
- Lombard-Pápa TFC: Szűcs – Takács, Farkas, Supic, Németh – Gyömbér, Heffler (G. Tóth 83.), Rebryk (Quintero 75.) – Abwo, Bárányos (N. Tóth 88.), Maric. Coach: György Véber.
- Újpest FC: Balajcza – Szokol, Takács, Vermes, Pollák – Simek, Mitrovic, Egerszegi (Böőr 46.), Simon (Barczi 62.) – Tisza, Rajczi (Matos 65.). Coach: Géza Mészöly.
- G.: Vermes (4. – og.), Maric (69.), Heffler (82.) – Tisza (72.)
- Y.: Supic (43.), Gyömbér (75.) – Takács (77.), Barczi (84.)

30 October 2010
17:00 CEST

BFC Siófok	0–1 (0–0)	Lombard-Pápa TFC
Graszl (yellow card) 29'	(Report)	Marić 53'; N. Tóth (yellow card) 89'

Révesz Géza Stadion, Siófok
Attendance: 700
Referee: Roland Veizer
- BFC Siófok: Molnár – Márton, Fehér, Graszl, László – Ribeiro, Tusori (Délczeg 60.), Ludánszki, Lukács (Ivanovics 57.) – Homma, Sowunmi. Coach: István Mihalecz.
- Lombard-Pápa TFC: Szűcs – Takács (N. Tóth 46.), Supic (G. Tóth 33.), A. Farkas, Németh – Heffler (Quintero 73.), Gyömbér, Rebryk – Abwo, Bárányos, Maric. Coach: György Véber.
- G.: Maric (53.)
- Y.: Graszl (29.) – N. Tóth (89.)

6 November 2010
16:00 CEST

Lombard-Pápa TFC	2–1 (1–1)	Vasas SC
Lázok 6' (o.g.); Marić 66'; Farkas (yellow card) 90'	(Report)	Ferenczi 15'; Balog (yellow card) 69'

Stadion Várkerti, Pápa
Attendance: 2,200
Referee: Ádám Farkas
- Lombard-Pápa TFC: Szűcs – Takács (Quintero 46.), Farkas, Supic, Németh – Heffler (N. Tóth 70.), Gyömbér, Rebryk – Abwo (G. Tóth 83.), Bárányos, Maric. Coach: György Véber.
- Vasas SC: Végh – Balog, Gáspár, Mileusnic (Hrepka 73.), Polényi – Arsic, Bakos, Németh (Pavicevic 66.), Mundi (Beliczky 85.) – Lázok, Ferenczi. Coach: András Komjáti.
- G.: Lázok (6. – o.g.), Maric (66.) – Ferenczi (15.)
- Y.: Farkas (90.) – Balog (69.)

12 November 2010
17:00 CEST

MTK Budapest FC	2–1 (0–1)	Lombard-Pápa TFC
Szabó (yellow card) 43'; Könyves 75'; Eppel 79'	(Report)	Abwo 17'; Bárányos (yellow card) 43'; Takács (yellow card) 55'

Stadion Hidegkuti Nándor, Budapest
Attendance: 800
Referee: János Takács
- MTK Budapest FC: Szatmári – Vukadinovic, Szekeres, Sütő (Pátkai 66.), Vadnai – Szabó (Nikházi 73.), Vukmir, Kanta, Ladányi, Könyves – Tischler (Eppel 46.). Coach: József Garami.
- Lombard-Pápa TFC: Szűcs – Takács (Quintero 58.), Farkas, Supic, Németh – Rebryk, Gyömbér, Bárányos – Abwo, Maric, Heffler (N. Tóth 18.). Coach: György Véber.
- G.: Könyves (75.), Eppel (79.) – Abwo (17.)
- Y.: Szabó (43.) – Bárányos (43.), Takács (55.)

20 November 2010
17:30 CEST

Lombard-Pápa TFC	0–5 (0–3)	Ferencvárosi TC
Bárányos (yellow card) 28'; Németh (yellow card) 85'	(Report)	Andrezinho (yellow card) 6'; Rodenbücher (yellow card) 9'; Schembri 18' 27' 76'; Heinz 40'; Morales 75'; Csizmadia (yellow card) 80'; Tóth (yellow card) 88'

Stadion Várkerti, Pápa
Attendance: 4,800
Referee: Zoltán Iványi
- Lombard-Pápa TFC: Szűcs – G. Tóth, Farkas, Supic, Németh – Rebryk, Gyömbér, Bárányos, N. Tóth (Palkó 65.) – Abwo (Quintero 55.), Maric (Jovánczai 13.). Coach: György Véber.
- Ferencvárosi TC: Haber – Balog, Csizmadia, Rodenbücher – Rósa, Józsi, Maróti, Andrezinho (Dragóner 83.) – Schembri (Tóth 77.), Heinz, Miljkovic (Morales 67.). Coach: László Prukner.
- G.: Schembri (18., 27., 76.), Heinz (40.), Morales (75.)
- Y.: Bárányos (28.), Németh (85.) – Andrezinho (6.), Rodenbücher (9.), Csizmadia (80.), Tóth (88.)

== Hungarian Cup ==
=== Third round ===
22 September 2010
15:30 CEST

Győri ETO FC II	1–2 (0–1)	Lombard-Pápa TFC
Simon (yellow card) 42'; Berde 59' (yellow card) 66'; Nagy (red card) 88'	(Report)	Németh (yellow card) 11'; Karácsony (yellow card) 30'; Rebryk 35'; Marić (yellow card) 66'; Jovánczai (yellow card) 85'; Quintero 91'

ETO Park, Győr
Attendance: 600
Referee: Gábor Kovács
- Győri ETO FC II: Radosavljevic – Nagy, Bieder, Totadze (Paget 70.), Vető – Windecker, Molnár, Kiss (Horváth 46.), Berde – Simon (Varga 55.), Ahjupera. Coach: István Klement.
- Lombard-Pápa TFC: Szűcs – Dlusztus, Karácsony – Bárányos, Gyömbér, Heffler, Németh, Quintero (Zulevs 92.), Rebryk, Takács – Maric (Jovánczai 67.; Bali 85.). Coach: György Véber.
- G.: Berde (59.) – Rebryk (35.), Quintero (91.)
- Y.: Simon (42.), Berde (66.) – Németh (11.), Karácsony (30.), Maric (66.), Jovánczai (85.)
- R.: Nagy (88.)

=== Fourth round ===
27 October 2010
14:30 CEST

Gyirmót SE	1–1 (1–1)	Lombard-Pápa TFC
Varga (yellow card) 1'; Laki 45+1'; Pirka (yellow card) 97' (yellow-red card) 100'; Tóth (yellow card) 103'; Kozmér (yellow card) 114'	(Report)	Bárányos 2' (pen.) (yellow card) 47'; Rebryk (yellow card) 26'; G. Tóth (yellow card) 31'; Dlusztus (yellow card) 55' (yellow-red card) 109'; Šupić (red card) 76'
Penalties
Kiss (penalty missed); Kozmér (penalty missed); Baumgartner (penalty scored); Czanik (penalty scored); Nagy (penalty missed)	2–3	Bárányos (penalty scored); Gyömbér (penalty missed); Heffler (penalty missed); Žuļevs (penalty scored); Takács (penalty scored)

Városi Stadion, Győr-Gyirmót
Attendance: 300
Referee: Ádám Németh
- Gyirmót SE: Deli – Kiss, Kozmér, Böjte, Varga (Pirka 81.) – Czanik, Baumgartner, B. Tóth (Horváth 113.), Nagy – Laki, Weitner (N. Tóth 74.). Coach: Jószef Kiprich.
- Lombard-Pápa TFC: Szűcs – G. Tóth (Quintero 57.), Heffler, Abwo, Takács – Gyömbér, Rebryk (Dlusztus 46.), Bárányos, Maric (Zulevs 78.) – Supic, Németh. Coach: György Véber.
- G.: Laki (45.+1) – Bárányos (2. – pen.)
- Y.: Varga (1.), Pirka (97.), N. Tóth (103.), Kozmér (114.) – Rebryk (26.), G. Tóth (30.), Bárányos (47.), Dlusztus (55.)
- R.: Pirka (100.) – Supic (76.), Dlusztus (109.)
