= 2011–12 BFC Siófok season =

BFC Siófok
2011–12 season
- Chairman: (Hungary) Ferenc Nemes
- Manager: (Hungary) István Mihalecz
- NB 1: 9.
- Hungarian Cup: 4. Round
- Hungarian League Cup: Group Stage
- Top goalscorer: League: (Hungary) Vilmos Melczer (8); All: (Hungary) Vilmos Melczer (9)
- Highest home attendance: 4,500 v Videoton (17 August 2011)
- Lowest home attendance: 100 v Kaposvár (8 November 2011)
Home colours	Away colours	Third colours

The 2011–12 season will be BFC Siófok's 19th competitive season, 2nd consecutive season in the OTP Bank Liga and 80th year in existence as a football club.

== First team squad ==
Note: Flags indicate national team as defined under FIFA eligibility rules; some limited exceptions apply. Players may hold more than one non-FIFA nationality.

No.	Pos.	Nation	Player
1	GK	HUN	Márk Heinrich
2	DF	HUN	József Mogyorósi
3	DF	HUN	Zsolt Fehér
4	DF	HUN	András Fejes (loan from Videoton FC)
5	MF	HUN	Vilmos Melczer (loan from Budaörsi SC)
6	MF	HUN	Tamás Egerszegi (loan from Újpest FC)
7	MF	HUN	Bence Horváth
8	MF	HUN	Norbert Heffler (loan from Paksi SE)
9	FW	HUN	Attila Simon
11	MF	HUN	Szabolcs Kanta
12	GK	SVK	Ladislav Rybánsky

No.	Pos.	Nation	Player
13	MF	HUN	Tamás Kecskés
14	FW	HUN	Szabolcs Pál (loan from Diósgyőri VTK)
15	FW	HUN	Thomas Sowunmi
17	DF	HUN	István Nagy (loan from Paksi SE)
20	MF	HUN	Tibor Nyári
21	DF	HUN	Dániel Lengyel
23	MF	HUN	Tamás Huszák (loan from Debreceni VSC)
25	FW	HUN	Zsolt Haraszti (loan from Videoton FC)
26	GK	HUN	Árpád Milinte
28	DF	HUN	Zsolt Kiss
29	DF	CMR	Eugene Fomumbod

== Transfers ==
=== Summer ===
In: Note: Flags indicate national team as defined under FIFA eligibility rules; some limited exceptions apply. Players may hold more than one non-FIFA nationality.

No.	Pos.	Nation	Player
1	GK	HUN	Szabolcs Varga (Balatonfüredi FC)
4	DF	HUN	András Fejes (loan from Videoton FC)
7	MF	HUN	Bence Horváth (from (Austria) SKN St. Pölten)
8	MF	HUN	Norbert Lattenstein (from Szombathelyi Haladás)
9	FW	HUN	Péter Bali (from Lombard-Pápa TFC)
10	FW	HUN	János Farkas (from FC Tatabánya)
12	DF	HUN	Tamás Mester (loan from Ferencvárosi TC)
14	DF	HUN	Dániel Köntös (from FC Tatabánya)
15	FW	HUN	Thomas Sowunmi (from (Cyprus) APOP Kinyras Peyias FC)
17	FW	UKR	Denys Rebryk (from Lombard-Pápa TFC)
18	DF	HUN	János Szabó (loan from Paksi SE)
20	MF	HUN	Tibor Nyári (from Győri ETO FC II)
21	MF	HUN	Dániel Lengyel (from Szombathelyi Haladás)
23	MF	HUN	Tamás Huszák (loan from Debreceni VSC)
25	FW	HUN	Zsolt Haraszti (loan from Paksi SE)
26	GK	HUN	Árpád Milinte (from Kaposvári Rákóczi FC)
28	DF	HUN	Zsolt Kiss (from Gyirmót SE)
29	FW	MNE	Bojan Božović (from (Belgium) Cercle Brugge K.S.V.)
––	DF	HUN	Szilárd Éles (loan from Debreceni VSC)

Out: Note: Flags indicate national team as defined under FIFA eligibility rules; some limited exceptions apply. Players may hold more than one non-FIFA nationality.

No.	Pos.	Nation	Player
1	GK	HUN	Pál Szalma (to Balmazújvárosi FC)
3	DF	HUN	András László (retired)
8	MF	HUN	Tihamér Lukács (to (Austria) SV Eberau)
9	FW	HUN	Gergely Délczeg (to Budapest Honvéd FC)
10	FW	NGA	Henry Isaac (Unemployed)
10	FW	HUN	János Farkas (loan to FC Tatabánya)
12	GK	SVK	Péter Molnár (loan return to Győri ETO FC)
17	FW	JPN	Kazuo Homma (loan return to Nyíregyháza Spartacus)
20	FW	HUN	Csaba Csordás (to Soproni VSE)
20	FW	BRA	Roni (to (Austria) SC-ESV Parndorf 1919)
21	FW	CIV	Jean Paul Nomel (to Szeged 2011)
24	DF	HUN	Attila Katona (to Egri FC)
25	DF	SVK	Dávid Márton (to Gyirmót SE)
28	DF	HUN	Károly Graszl (to Kaposvári Rákóczi FC)
29	DF	HUN	Alexisz Novák (loan return to Budapest Honvéd FC)
––	GK	HUN	Balázs Bartus (to Pálhalma SE)
––	MF	HUN	István Ludánszki (to Balmazújvárosi FC)
––	MF	HUN	Mihály Marozsán (to Nyírbátor FC)
––	MF	HUN	Róbert Tóth (to Móri SE)
––	MF	BRA	Thiago (to Veszprém FC)
––	DF	HUN	Gábor Kocsis (loan return to Videoton FC)

=== Winter ===
In: Note: Flags indicate national team as defined under FIFA eligibility rules; some limited exceptions apply. Players may hold more than one non-FIFA nationality.

No.	Pos.	Nation	Player
1	GK	HUN	Márk Heinrich (from (Austria) SC Oberpullendorf)
6	MF	HUN	Tamás Egerszegi (on loan from Újpest FC)
8	MF	HUN	Norbert Heffler (on loan from Paksi SE)
9	FW	HUN	Attila Simon (from Kecskeméti TE)
12	GK	SVK	Ladislav Rybánsky (from Kecskeméti TE)
14	FW	HUN	Szabolcs Pál (on loan from Diósgyőri VTK)
17	DF	HUN	István Nagy (on loan from Paksi SE)
25	FW	HUN	Zsolt Haraszti (on loan from Videoton FC)
29	DF	CMR	Eugene Fomumbod (from Győri ETO FC)
—	FW	HUN	Patrik Krómer (from Szigetszentmiklósi TK)

Out: Note: Flags indicate national team as defined under FIFA eligibility rules; some limited exceptions apply. Players may hold more than one non-FIFA nationality.

No.	Pos.	Nation	Player
6	DF	HUN	Richárd Tusori
8	MF	HUN	Norbert Lattenstein (to Budaörsi SC)
9	FW	HUN	Péter Bali (to Veszprém FC)
12	GK	HUN	Tamás Mester (loan return to Ferencvárosi TC)
12	GK	HUN	Zoltán Szatmári
14	DF	HUN	Dániel Köntös (to Dunafém-Maroshegy SE)
16	FW	HUN	Imre Csermelyi (to Lombard-Pápa TFC)
17	FW	UKR	Denys Rebryk (to Ceglédi VSE)
18	DF	HUN	János Szabó (loan return to Paksi SE)
24	MF	HUN	Attila Horváth (on loan to FC Ajka)
25	FW	HUN	Zsolt Haraszti (loan return to Paksi SE)
29	FW	MNE	Bojan Božović (on loan to Budapest Honvéd FC)

- List of Hungarian football transfer summer 2011
- List of Hungarian football transfers winter 2011–12

== Statistics ==
=== Appearances and goals ===
Last updated on 27 May 2012.

No.	Pos	Nat	Player	Total		OTP Bank Liga		Hungarian Cup		League Cup	
No.	Pos	Nat	Player	Apps	Goals	Apps	Goals	Apps	Goals	Apps	Goals
1	GK	(Hungary) HUN	Márk Heinrich	2	-3	2	-3	0	0	0	0
2	DF	(Hungary) HUN	József Mogyorósi	27	0	20	0	2	0	5	0
3	DF	(Hungary) HUN	Zsolt Fehér	28	0	25	0	0	0	3	0
4	DF	(Hungary) HUN	András Fejes	26	1	22	0	0	0	4	1
5	MF	(Hungary) HUN	Vilmos Melczer	29	9	25	8	1	0	3	1
6	MF	(Hungary) HUN	Tamás Egerszegi	12	0	12	0	0	0	0	0
7	MF	(Hungary) HUN	Bence Horváth	17	0	9	0	2	0	6	0
8	MF	(Hungary) HUN	Norbert Heffler	4	0	4	0	0	0	0	0
9	FW	(Hungary) HUN	Attila Simon	13	7	13	7	0	0	0	0
10	FW	(Hungary) HUN	János Farkas	3	0	3	0	0	0	0	0
11	MF	(Hungary) HUN	Szabolcs Kanta	7	0	7	0	0	0	0	0
12	GK	(Slovakia) SVK	Ladislav Rybánsky	9	-10	9	-10	0	0	0	0
13	MF	(Hungary) HUN	Tamás Kecskés	30	0	29	0	0	0	1	0
14	FW	(Hungary) HUN	Szabolcs Pál	12	1	12	1	0	0	0	0
15	FW	(Hungary) HUN	Thomas Sowunmi	25	2	22	0	0	0	3	2
17	DF	(Hungary) HUN	István Nagy	6	0	6	0	0	0	0	0
20	MF	(Hungary) HUN	Tibor Nyári	27	1	25	1	0	0	2	0
21	MF	(Hungary) HUN	Dániel Lengyel	23	1	17	0	2	0	4	1
23	MF	(Hungary) HUN	Tamás Huszák	23	2	18	1	1	1	4	0
25	FW	(Hungary) HUN	Zsolt Haraszti	27	5	27	5	0	0	0	0
26	GK	(Hungary) HUN	Árpád Milinte	17	-26	17	-26	0	0	0	0
28	DF	(Hungary) HUN	Zsolt Kiss	24	0	22	0	0	0	2	0
29	DF	(Cameroon) CMR	Eugene Fomumbod	3	0	3	0	0	0	0	0
Youth players
19	DF	(Hungary) HUN	Szilárd Pécseli	7	0	0	0	2	0	5	0
22	DF	(Cameroon) CMR	Yvan Yondo	1	0	0	0	0	0	1	0
31	MF	(Hungary) HUN	Gergely Balogh	4	0	0	0	1	0	3	0
32	MF	(Hungary) HUN	Gábor Gadó	7	0	0	0	2	0	5	0
Players currently out on loan
29	FW	(Montenegro) MNE	Bojan Božović	14	1	9	0	2	0	3	1
Players no longer at the club
6	DF	(Hungary) HUN	Richárd Tusori	18	2	16	2	1	0	1	0
8	MF	(Hungary) HUN	Norbert Lattenstein	18	2	11	1	2	0	5	1
9	FW	(Hungary) HUN	Péter Bali	7	0	3	0	2	0	2	0
12	GK	(Hungary) HUN	Tamás Mester	5	-6	1	-1	1	0	3	-5
12	GK	(Hungary) HUN	Zoltán Szatmári	5	-5	1	-1	1	-2	3	-2
14	DF	(Hungary) HUN	Dániel Köntös	4	0	0	0	0	0	4	0
16	FW	(Hungary) HUN	Imre Csermelyi	9	2	4	0	2	2	3	0
17	FW	(Ukraine) UKR	Denys Rebryk	14	0	7	0	2	0	5	0
18	DF	(Hungary) HUN	János Szabó	12	2	10	2	0	0	2	0
24	MF	(Hungary) HUN	Attila Horváth	16	1	8	0	2	0	6	1

=== Top scorers ===
Includes all competitive matches. The list is sorted by shirt number when total goals are equal.

Last updated on 27 May 2012

Position	Nation	Number	Name	OTP Bank Liga	Hungarian Cup	League Cup	Total
1	(Hungary)	5	Vilmos Melczer	8	0	1	9
2	(Hungary)	9	Attila Simon	7	0	0	7
3	(Hungary)	25	Zsolt Haraszti	5	0	0	5
4	(Hungary)	18	János Szabó	2	0	0	2
5	(Hungary)	6	Richárd Tusori	2	0	0	2
6	(Hungary)	23	Tamás Huszák	1	1	0	2
7	(Hungary)	8	Norbert Lattenstein	1	0	1	2
8	(Hungary)	16	Imre Csermelyi	0	2	0	2
9	(Hungary) (Nigeria)	15	Thomas Sowunmi	0	0	2	2
10	(Hungary)	20	Tibor Nyári	1	0	0	1
11	(Hungary)	14	Szabolcs Pál	1	0	0	1
12	(Hungary)	21	Dániel Lengyel	0	0	1	1
13	(Montenegro)	29	Bojan Božović	0	0	1	1
14	(Hungary)	4	András Fejes	0	0	1	1
/	/	/	Own Goals	2	0	0	2
			TOTALS	30	3	7	40

=== Disciplinary record ===
Includes all competitive matches. Players with 1 card or more included only.

Last updated on 27 May 2012

Position	Nation	Number	Name	OTP Bank Liga		Hungarian Cup		League Cup		Total (Hu Total)	
Position	Nation	Number	Name	Booked	Sent off (straight red)	Booked	Sent off (straight red)	Booked	Sent off (straight red)	Booked	Sent off (straight red)
DF	(Hungary)	2	József Mogyorósi	5	0	0	0	3	0	8 (5)	0 (0)
DF	(Hungary)	3	Zsolt Fehér	2	0	0	0	2	0	4 (2)	0 (0)
DF	(Hungary)	4	András Fejes	5	0	0	0	0	0	5 (5)	0 (0)
MF	(Hungary)	5	Vilmos Melczer	6	1	0	0	1	0	7 (6)	1 (1)
MF	(Hungary)	6	Tamás Egerszegi	5	0	0	0	0	0	5 (5)	0 (0)
FW	(Hungary)	7	Bence Horváth	0	0	0	0	1	0	1 (0)	0 (0)
MF	(Hungary)	8	Norbert Heffler	1	0	0	0	0	0	1 (1)	0 (0)
MF	(Hungary)	8	Norbert Lattenstein	0	0	1	0	0	0	1 (0)	0 (0)
FW	(Hungary)	9	Attila Simon	2	0	0	0	0	0	2 (2)	0 (0)
FW	(Hungary)	9	Péter Bali	0	0	0	0	1	0	1 (0)	0 (0)
FW	(Hungary)	10	János Farkas	1	0	0	0	0	0	1 (1)	0 (0)
GK	(Slovakia)	12	Ladislav Rybánsky	2	0	0	0	0	0	2 (2)	0 (0)
MF	(Hungary)	13	Tamás Kecskés	7	0	0	0	0	0	7 (7)	0 (0)
FW	(Hungary)	14	Szabolcs Pál	1	0	0	0	0	0	1 (1)	0 (0)
FW	(Hungary) (Nigeria)	15	Thomas Sowunmi	2	0	0	0	0	0	2 (2)	0 (0)
FW	(Ukraine) (Hungary)	17	Denys Rebryk	1	0	0	0	1	0	2 (1)	0 (0)
MF	(Hungary)	20	Tibor Nyári	3	1	0	0	0	0	3 (3)	1 (1)
MF	(Hungary)	21	Dániel Lengyel	4	1	0	0	0	0	4 (4)	1 (1)
DF	(Cameroon)	22	Yvan Yondo	0	0	0	0	1	0	1 (0)	0 (0)
MF	(Hungary)	23	Tamás Huszák	4	0	0	0	0	0	4 (4)	0 (0)
MF	(Hungary)	24	Attila Horváth	0	0	0	0	2	0	2 (0)	0 (0)
FW	(Hungary)	25	Zsolt Haraszti	6	0	0	0	0	0	6 (6)	0 (0)
DF	(Hungary)	28	Zsolt Kiss	3	1	0	0	0	0	3 (3)	1 (1)
FW	(Montenegro)	29	Bojan Božović	1	0	1	0	1	0	3 (1)	0 (0)
MF	(Hungary)	32	Gábor Gadó	0	0	1	0	2	0	3 (0)	0 (0)
			TOTALS	61	4	3	0	15	0	79 (61)	4 (4)

=== Overall ===
Games played	38 (30 OTP Bank Liga, 2 Hungarian Cup and 6 Hungarian League Cup)
Games won	13 (9 OTP Bank Liga, 1 Hungarian Cup and 3 Hungarian League Cup)
Games drawn	10 (9 OTP Bank Liga, 0 Hungarian Cup and 1 Hungarian League Cup)
Games lost	15 (12 OTP Bank Liga, 1 Hungarian Cup and 2 Hungarian League Cup)
Goals scored	40
Goals conceded	50
Goal difference	-10
Yellow cards	79
Red cards	4
Worst discipline	(Hungary) Vilmos Melczer (7 (yellow card) , 1 (red card) )
Best result	2–0 (H) v Újpest FC - OTP Bank Liga - 30-07-2011
Best result	3–1 (H) v Kaposvári Rákóczi FC - OTP Bank Liga - 20-08-2011
Best result	2–0 (A) v Zalaegerszegi TE II - Hungarian Cup - 21-09-2011
Best result	2–0 (H) v Kaposvári Rákóczi FC - Hungarian League Cup - 08-11-2011
Best result	3–1 (H) v Lombard-Pápa TFC - OTP Bank Liga - 26-11-2011
Best result	2–0 (H) v Paksi SE - OTP Bank Liga - 17-03-2012
Best result	2–0 (H) v Zalaegerszegi TE - OTP Bank Liga - 12-05-2012
Worst result	0–7 (A) v Videoton FC - OTP Bank Liga - 19-11-2011
Most appearances	(Hungary) Tamás Kecskés (30 appearances)
Top scorer	(Hungary) Vilmos Melczer (9 goal)
Points	50/114 (43.86%)

Last updated: 27 May 2012

== Nemzeti Bajnokság I ==
=== Matches ===
17 August 2011 1	BFC Siófok	0–0	Videoton FC	Siófok, Somogy County
19:00 CET (UTC+01)		(Report)		Stadium: Révész Street Stadium; Attendance: 4,500; Referee: (Hungary) Ádám Farkas

23 July 2011 2	Lombard-Pápa TFC	2–0	BFC Siófok	Pápa, Veszprém County
19:00 CET (UTC+01)	Marić 47' 78'	(Report)		Stadium: Stadion Várkerti; Attendance: 2,000; Referee: (Hungary) János Takács

30 July 2011 3	BFC Siófok	2–0	Újpest FC	Siófok, Somogy County
19:00 CET (UTC+01)	Haraszti 1'; Huszák 45'	(Report)		Stadium: Révész Street Stadium; Attendance: 5,000; Referee: (Hungary) Balázs Berke

6 August 2011 4	BFC Siófok	0–1	Győri ETO FC	Siófok, Somogy County
19:00 CET (UTC+01)		(Report)	Aleksidze 26'	Stadium: Révész Street Stadium; Attendance: 2,500; Referee: (Hungary) Szabolcs Szilasi

13 August 2011 5	Paksi SE	1–1	BFC Siófok	Paks, Tolna County
19:00 CET (UTC+01)	Bartha 19'	(Report)	Melczer 32'	Stadium: Stadion PSE; Attendance: 2,500; Referee: (Hungary) Zsolt Szabó

20 August 2011 6	BFC Siófok	3–1	Kaposvári Rákóczi FC	Siófok, Somogy County
19:00 CET (UTC+01)	Melczer 25' (pen.) 28' (pen.) 65' (pen.)	(Report)	Bank 16'	Stadium: Révész Street Stadium; Attendance: 3,000; Referee: (Hungary) János Takács

27 August 2011 7	Diósgyőri VTK	2–1	BFC Siófok	Miskolc, Borsod-Abaúj-Zemplén County
15:00 CET (UTC+01)	George 54'; Luque 80'	(Report)	Melczer 18' (pen.)	Stadium: DVTK Stadion; Attendance: 5,000; Referee: (Hungary) Balázs Böcskei

9 September 2011 8	BFC Siófok	0–0	Debreceni VSC	Siófok, Somogy County
18:00 CET (UTC+01)		(Report)		Stadium: Révész Street Stadium; Attendance: 500; Referee: (Hungary) István Vad

17 September 2011 9	Pécsi Mecsek FC	1–1	BFC Siófok	Pécs, Baranya County
19:00 CET (UTC+01)	Sowunmi 25' (o.g.)	(Report)	Szabó 60'	Stadium: Stadion PMFC; Attendance: 3,500; Referee: (Hungary) Ádám Radványi

24 September 2011 10	BFC Siófok	0–0	Budapest Honvéd FC	Siófok, Somogy County
18:00 CET (UTC+01)		(Report)		Stadium: Révész Street Stadium; Attendance: 1,500; Referee: (Hungary) Sándor Andó-Szabó

1 October 2011 11	Szombathelyi Haladás	2–1	BFC Siófok	Szombathely, Vas County
18:00 CET (UTC+01)	Kovács 5'; Sluka 14'	(Report)	Lattenstein 71'	Stadium: Rohonci Street Stadium; Attendance: 5,000; Referee: (Hungary) Balázs Berke

15 October 2011 12	BFC Siófok	0–0	Vasas SC	Siófok, Somogy County
18:00 CET (UTC+01)		(Report)		Stadium: Révész Street Stadium; Attendance: 500; Referee: (Hungary) Gábor Oláh

22 October 2011 13	Zalaegerszegi TE	1–1	BFC Siófok	Zalaegerszeg, Zala County
17:00 CET (UTC+01)	Méyé 87' (pen.)	(Report)	Szabó 45'	Stadium: ZTE Arena; Attendance: 2,656; Referee: (Hungary) Ádám Németh

30 October 2011 14	BFC Siófok	0–2	Ferencvárosi TC	Siófok, Somogy County
18:00 CET (UTC+01)		(Report)	Pölöskey 26'; Hakola 75'	Stadium: Révész Street Stadium; Attendance: 3,500; Referee: (Hungary) Zoltán Iványi

5 November 2011 15	Kecskeméti TE	3–2	BFC Siófok	Kecskemét, Bács-Kiskun County
16:00 CET (UTC+01)	Foxi 22'; Litsingi 48'; Lencse 59'	(Report)	Haraszti 21'; Tusori 45'	Stadium: Széktói Stadion; Attendance: 2,000; Referee: (Hungary) Balázs Berke

19 November 2011 16	Videoton FC	7–0	BFC Siófok	Székesfehérvár, Fejér County
15:00 CET (UTC+01)	Oliveira 41'; Alves 45' 82' 86'; Sándor 61'; Nikolić 80' 88'	(Report)		Stadium: Stadion Sóstói; Attendance: 2,500; Referee: (Hungary) Gábor Oláh

26 November 2011 17	BFC Siófok	3–1	Lombard-Pápa TFC	Siófok, Somogy County
16:00 CET (UTC+01)	Melczer 27'; Présinger 68' (o.g.); Tusori 79'	(Report)	Présinger 37'	Stadium: Révész Street Stadium; Attendance: 500; Referee: (Hungary) Mihály Fábián

3 March 2012 18	Újpest FC	1–1	BFC Siófok	Budapest, Pest County
16:00 CET (UTC+01)	Kabát 34'	(Report)	Simon 72'	Stadium: Szusza Ferenc Stadium; Attendance: 5,234; Referee: (Hungary) Balázs Böcskei

9 March 2012 19	Győri ETO FC	4–1	BFC Siófok	Győr, Győr-Moson-Sopron County
18:00 CET (UTC+01)	Pátkai 57' 72' 86'; Dinjar 83'	(Report)	Simon 90+1'	Stadium: ETO Park; Attendance: 2,500; Referee: (Hungary) Szabolcs Szilasi

17 March 2012 20	BFC Siófok	2–0	Paksi SE	Siófok, Somogy County
16:00 CET (UTC+01)	Haraszti 29'; Melczer 71'	(Report)		Stadium: Révész Street Stadium; Attendance: 1,000; Referee: (Hungary) Mihály Fábián

24 March 2012 21	Kaposvári Rákóczi FC	2–3	BFC Siófok	Kaposvár, Somogy County
17:00 CET (UTC+01)	Bebeto 57'; Haruna 73'	(Report)	Nyári 18'; Haraszti 20'; Simon 36'	Stadium: Stadion Kaposvár Rákóczi; Attendance: 2,500; Referee: (Hungary) Zoltán Iványi

30 March 2012 22	BFC Siófok	1–0	Diósgyőri VTK	Siófok, Somogy County
18:00 CET (UTC+01)	Simon 32'	(Report)		Stadium: Révész Street Stadium; Attendance: 2,000; Referee: (Hungary) Ádám Farkas

7 April 2012 23	Debreceni VSC	1–1	BFC Siófok	Debrecen, Hajdú-Bihar County
15:00 CET (UTC+01)	Mészáros 57'	(Report)	Šimac 80' (o.g.)	Stadium: Stadion Oláh Gábor Út; Attendance: 6,000; Referee: (Hungary) Balázs Berke

14 April 2012 24	BFC Siófok	2–1	Pécsi Mecsek FC	Siófok, Somogy County
16:00 CET (UTC+01)	Simon 90+1' (pen.); Haraszti 90+5'	(Report)	Horváth 70'	Stadium: Révész Street Stadium; Attendance: 1,000; Referee: (Hungary) Zsolt Szabó

20 April 2012 25	Budapest Honvéd FC	3–1	BFC Siófok	Budapest, Pest County
18:00 CET (UTC+01)	Lovrić 50'; Ivancsics 71'; Faggyas 80'	(Report)	Simon 84'	Stadium: Bozsik Stadion; Attendance: 1,000; Referee: (Hungary) Roland Veizer

28 April 2012 26	BFC Siófok	0–2	Szombathelyi Haladás	Siófok, Somogy County
18:00 CET (UTC+01)		(Report)	Halmosi 52'; Oross 83'	Stadium: Révész Street Stadium; Attendance: 500; Referee: (Hungary) Balázs Böcskei

5 May 2012 27	Vasas SC	1–0	BFC Siófok	Budapest, Pest County
17:00 CET (UTC+01)	Nyári 71' (o.g.)	(Report)		Stadium: Stadion Rudolf Illovszky; Attendance: 1,000; Referee: (Hungary) János Takács

12 May 2012 28	BFC Siófok	2–0	Zalaegerszegi TE	Siófok, Somogy County
18:00 CET (UTC+01)	Melczer 21'; Pál 47'	(Report)		Stadium: Révész Street Stadium; Attendance: 300; Referee: (Hungary) Mihály Fábián

19 May 2012 29	Ferencvárosi TC	0–1	BFC Siófok	Budapest, Pest County
15:00 CET (UTC+01)		(Report)	Simon 85'	Stadium: Stadion Albert Flórián; Attendance: 6,000; Referee: (Hungary) Szabolcs Szilasi

26 May 2012 30	BFC Siófok	0–2	Kecskeméti TE	Siófok, Somogy County
15:00 CET (UTC+01)		(Report)	Lencse 45' (pen.); Bertus 69'	Stadium: Révész Street Stadium; Attendance: 500; Referee: (Hungary) Viktor Kassai

=== Classification ===
Pos	Team	Pld	W	D	L	GF	GA	GD	Pts
7	Diósgyőr	30	13	4	13	42	43	−1	43
8	Haladás	30	9	11	10	39	37	+2	38
9	Siófok	30	9	9	12	30	41	−11	36
10	Kaposvár	30	7	14	9	35	42	−7	35
11	Ferencváros	30	9	7	14	32	35	−3	34

Source: MLSZ (in Hungarian)
Rules for classification: 1st points; 2nd overall wins; 3rd goal difference; 4th goals scored

=== Results summary ===
Overall								Home						Away					
Pld	W	D	L	GF	GA	GD	Pts	W	D	L	GF	GA	GD	W	D	L	GF	GA	GD
30	9	9	12	30	41	−11	36	7	4	4	15	10	+5	2	5	8	15	31	−16

Last updated: 27 May 2012.
Source: NB1

=== Results by round ===
Round	1	2	3	4	5	6	7	8	9	10	11	12	13	14	15	16	17	18	19	20	21	22	23	24	25	26	27	28	29	30
Ground	H	A	H	H	A	H	A	H	A	H	A	H	A	H	A	A	H	A	A	H	A	H	A	H	A	H	A	H	A	H
Result	D	L	W	L	D	W	L	D	D	D	L	D	D	L	L	L	W	D	L	W	W	W	D	W	L	L	L	W	W	L
Position	10	11	9	10	10	9	10	10	10	9	11	11	12	14	14	15	14	14	14	12	11	11	11	10	10	11	12	11	9	9

Updated to match(es) played on 27 May 2012. Source: Matches
A = Away; H = Home; W = Win; D = Draw; L = Loss

== Hungarian Cup ==
21 September 2011 3	Zalaegerszegi TE II	0–2	BFC Siófok	Zalaegerszeg, Zala County
15:30		(Report)	Huszák 37'; Csermelyi 64'	Stadium: ZTE Arena; Attendance: 200; Referee: (Hungary) Dávid Ákos

26 October 2011 4	Kozármisleny SE	2–1	BFC Siófok	Kozármisleny, Baranya County
14:00	Rácz 45'; Andruskó 64' (pen.)	(Report)	Csermelyi 12'	Stadium: Alkotmány téri Stadion; Attendance: 200; Referee: (Hungary) Ádám Radványi

== League Cup ==
=== Matches ===
31 August 2011 1	BFC Siófok	2–1	Ferencvárosi TC	Siófok, Somogy County
18:00	Lengyel 14'; Sowunmi 62'	(Report)	Pölöskey 20'	Stadium: Révész Street Stadium; Attendance: 500; Referee: (Hungary) Ádám Radványi

6 September 2011 2	Kaposvári Rákóczi FC	2–0	BFC Siófok	Kaposvár, Somogy County
16:30	Kovács 30'; Graszl 48'	(Report)		Stadium: Stadion Kaposvár Rákóczi; Attendance: 300; Referee: (Hungary) Béla Botló

5 October 2011 3	BFC Siófok	0–2	Pécsi Mecsek FC	Siófok, Somogy County
15:00		(Report)	Simonfalvi 59'; Horváth 61'	Stadium: Révész Street Stadium; Attendance: 200; Referee: (Hungary) Gergely Szőts

12 October 2011 4	Pécsi Mecsek FC	1–1	BFC Siófok	Pécs, Baranya County
18:00	Bajzát 45'	(Report)	Sowunmi 21'	Stadium: Stadion PMFC; Attendance: 200; Referee: (Hungary) László Lovas

8 November 2011 5	BFC Siófok	2–0	Kaposvári Rákóczi FC	Siófok, Somogy County
14:00	Božović 57'; Lattenstein 64'	(Report)		Stadium: Révész Street Stadium; Attendance: 100; Referee: (Hungary) Tibor Gyarmati

16 November 2011 6	Ferencvárosi TC	1–2	BFC Siófok	Budapest, Pest County
19:00	Oláh 56' (pen.)	(Report)	Fejes 52'; Melczer 60' (pen.)	Stadium: Stadion Albert Flórián; Attendance: 200; Referee: (Hungary) József Erdős

=== Classification ===
Pos	Team	Pld	W	D	L	GF	GA	GD	Pts	Qualification
1	Kaposvári Rákóczi FC	6	4	1	1	9	5	+4	13	Advance to knockout phase
2	Pécsi Mecsek	6	3	1	2	10	6	+4	10	
3	Siófok	6	3	1	2	7	7	0	10	
4	Ferencvárosi TC	6	0	1	5	6	13	−7	1	

Rules for classification: 1) points; 2) goal difference; 3) number of goals scored.

== Pre Season (Winter) ==
25 January 2012	BFC Siófok	1–0	Veszprém FC	Siófok, Somogy County
	Božović	(Report)		Stadium: Révész Street Stadium; Attendance: 50; Referee: (Hungary) Pákász

28 January 2012	BFC Siófok	4–1	Dunakanyar-Vác FC	Siófok, Somogy County
	Sowunmi; Nagy	(Report)		Stadium: Csárdaréti úti műfüves pálya Attendance: 50

2 February 2012	BFC Siófok	4–0	Ajka FC	Siófok, Somogy County
	Melczer; Huszák; Haraszti; Sowunmi	(Report)		Stadium: Csárdaréti úti műfüves pálya Attendance: 50; Referee: Pánkász

4 February 2012	Veszprém FC	2–1	BFC Siófok	Veszprém, Veszprém County
	Hevesi Tóth	(Report)	Melczer	Referee: Szabolcs Szilasi

8 February 2012	BFC Siófok	3–0	Szigetszentmiklósi TK	Siófok, Somogy County
	Sowunmi; Kanta; Huszák	(Report)		Stadium: Csárdaréti úti műfüves pálya Attendance: 50; Referee: Pánkász

11 February 2012	BFC Siófok	3–0	Kozármisleny SE	Siófok, Somogy County
	Simon; Nagy	(Report)

16 February 2012	(Austria) SV Harreither Gaflenz	1–0	BFC Siófok	Moravske Toplice, Prekmurje, Slovenia
	Rülling	(Report)

18 February 2012	BFC Siófok	2–2	Gyirmót SE	Siófok, Somogy County
	Melczer; Lengyel	(Report)	Csizmadia; Fitos

25 February 2012	(Slovenia) NK Nafta Lendava	1–2	BFC Siófok	Lendava, Prekmurje, Slovenia
		(Report)	Melczer (pen.)
