= 2012–13 BFC Siófok season =

BFC Siófok
2012–13 season
- Chairman: Ferenc Nemes
- Manager: Károly Horváth
- NB 1: 15th (relegated)
- Hungarian Cup: Quarter-final
- Hungarian League Cup: Group stage
- Top goalscorer: League: Vilmos Melczer (7); All: Vilmos Melczer (7); Szabolcs Pál (7)
- Highest home attendance: 2,500 v Győr (18 August 2012)
- Lowest home attendance: 50 v Vasas (27 February 2013)
Home colours	Away colours	Third colours

The 2012–13 season will be BFC Siófok's 20th competitive season, 3rd consecutive season in the OTP Bank Liga and 81st year in existence as a football club.

== First team squad ==
Note: Flags indicate national team as defined under FIFA eligibility rules; some limited exceptions apply. Players may hold more than one non-FIFA nationality.

No.	Pos.	Nation	Player
1	GK	HUN	Márk Heinrich
2	DF	HUN	Krisztián Timár
3	DF	HUN	Zsolt Fehér
4	DF	HUN	András Fejes (loan from Videoton FC)
5	MF	HUN	Vilmos Melczer
6	DF	HUN	Zoltán Takács
7	MF	HUN	Bence Horváth
8	MF	HUN	József Windecker (loan from Győri ETO FC)
9	FW	BIH	Jusuf Dajić
10	FW	HUN	János Máté (loan from Ferencvárosi TC)
11	MF	HUN	Máté Kiss (loan from Győri ETO FC)
12	GK	HUN	Péter Kurucz

No.	Pos.	Nation	Player
13	MF	HUN	Tamás Kecskés
14	FW	HUN	Szabolcs Pál
15	DF	HUN	Marcell Fodor (loan from Újpest FC)
16	DF	SRB	Stefan Deák (loan from Deportivo de La Coruña B)
17	MF	HUN	Tamás Nagy
18	DF	HUN	András Gál
20	MF	HUN	Tibor Nyári
21	DF	HUN	Zoltán Kiss
23	MF	HUN	Attila Menyhárt
24	DF	HUN	Noel Fülöp
28	DF	HUN	Zsolt Kiss
29	MF	HUN	Norbert Mokánszki

== Transfers ==
=== Summer ===
In: Note: Flags indicate national team as defined under FIFA eligibility rules; some limited exceptions apply. Players may hold more than one non-FIFA nationality.

No.	Pos.	Nation	Player
8	MF	HUN	József Windecker (loan from Győr)
9	FW	BIH	Jusuf Dajić (from Vasas)
10	MF	HUN	Norbert Sipos (from Szombathely)
10	FW	HUN	János Farkas (loan return from Tatabánya)
11	MF	HUN	Máté Kiss (loan from Győr)
12	GK	HUN	Péter Kurucz (from (England) West Ham United)
12	GK	HUN	Zoltán Szatmári (from (Denmark) Lyngby Boldklub)
14	FW	HUN	Szabolcs Pál (from Diósgyőr)
15	DF	HUN	Marcell Fodor (loan from Újpest)
16	DF	SRB	Stefan Deák (loan from (Spain) Deportivo B)
17	MF	HUN	Tamás Nagy (from (Austria) Sankt Andrä)
18	DF	HUN	András Gál (from MTK Budapest)
21	FW	HUN	Balázs Zamostny (loan from Újpest)
23	MF	SRB	Milan Cokić (loan from Kecskemét)
24	DF	HUN	Noel Fülöp (from Ferencváros)
24	MF	HUN	Attila Horváth (loan return from Ajka)
25	FW	HUN	Marcell Molnár (from MTK Budapest)
29	MF	SVK	Marián Sluka (from Szombathely)
29	FW	MNE	Bojan Božović (loan return from Budapest Honvéd)
—	FW	HUN	Bálint Bajner (from (Italy) Sulmona Calcio)

Out: Note: Flags indicate national team as defined under FIFA eligibility rules; some limited exceptions apply. Players may hold more than one non-FIFA nationality.

No.	Pos.	Nation	Player
8	MF	HUN	Norbert Heffler (loan return to Paks)
9	FW	HUN	Attila Simon (to Paks)
10	FW	HUN	János Farkas (to Sopron)
11	MF	HUN	Szabolcs Kanta (loan to Ajka)
12	GK	SVK	Ladislav Rybánsky (to Diósgyőr)
12	GK	HUN	Zoltán Szatmári (to Vasas)
14	FW	HUN	Szabolcs Pál (loan return to Diósgyőr)
15	FW	HUN	Thomas Sowunmi (to Ajka)
17	DF	HUN	István Nagy (loan return to Paks)
21	DF	HUN	Dániel Lengyel (to Békéscsaba)
23	MF	HUN	Tamás Huszák (loan return to Debrecen)
24	DF	HUN	Szilárd Éles (to Mezőkövesd)
24	MF	HUN	Attila Horváth (loan to Ajka)
25	FW	HUN	Zsolt Haraszti (loan return to Videoton)
26	GK	HUN	Árpád Milinte (to Pálhalma)
29	DF	CMR	Eugene Fomumbod (to Veszprém)
29	FW	MNE	Bojan Božović (to (Serbia) Hajduk Beograd)
—	FW	HUN	Bálint Bajner (to (Germany) Borussia Dortmund II)

=== Winter ===
In: Note: Flags indicate national team as defined under FIFA eligibility rules; some limited exceptions apply. Players may hold more than one non-FIFA nationality.

No.	Pos.	Nation	Player
2	DF	HUN	Krisztián Timár (from (Vietnam) Da Nang)
6	DF	HUN	Zoltán Takács (from Újpest FC)
10	FW	HUN	János Máté (loan from Ferencváros)
21	DF	HUN	Zoltán Kiss (from Békéscsaba)
23	MF	HUN	Attila Menyhárt (from Ferencváros)
29	MF	HUN	Norbert Mokánszki (from Debrecen II)

Out: Note: Flags indicate national team as defined under FIFA eligibility rules; some limited exceptions apply. Players may hold more than one non-FIFA nationality.

No.	Pos.	Nation	Player
2	DF	HUN	József Mogyorósi (to Kecskemét)
6	MF	HUN	Tamás Egerszegi (loan return to Újpest)
10	MF	HUN	Norbert Sipos (to Szombathely (futsal))
21	FW	HUN	Balázs Zamostny (loan return to Újpest)
23	MF	SRB	Milan Cokić (loan return to Kecskemét)
25	FW	HUN	Marcell Molnár (to BKV Előre)
29	MF	SVK	Marián Sluka (to Zalaegerszeg)

- List of Hungarian football transfers summer 2012
- List of Hungarian football transfers winter 2012–13

== Statistics ==
=== Appearances and goals ===
Last updated on 2 June 2013.

No.	Pos	Nat	Player	Total		OTP Bank Liga		Hungarian Cup		League Cup	
No.	Pos	Nat	Player	Apps	Goals	Apps	Goals	Apps	Goals	Apps	Goals
1	GK	(Hungary) HUN	Márk Heinrich	10	-10	1	-2	5	-3	4	-5
2	DF	(Hungary) HUN	Krisztián Timár	10	2	9	2	1	0	0	0
3	DF	(Hungary) HUN	Zsolt Fehér	28	2	22	1	3	1	3	0
4	DF	(Hungary) HUN	András Fejes	27	0	20	0	3	0	4	0
5	MF	(Hungary) HUN	Vilmos Melczer	30	7	25	7	3	0	2	0
6	DF	(Hungary) HUN	Zoltán Takács	14	1	12	1	2	0	0	0
7	MF	(Hungary) HUN	Bence Horváth	18	1	12	0	2	0	4	1
8	MF	(Hungary) HUN	József Windecker	29	2	21	2	4	0	4	0
9	FW	(Bosnia and Herzegovina) BIH	Jusuf Dajić	27	6	21	4	4	2	2	0
10	FW	(Hungary) HUN	János Máté	12	2	10	2	2	0	0	0
11	MF	(Hungary) HUN	Máté Kiss	26	2	18	2	5	0	3	0
12	GK	(Hungary) HUN	Péter Kurucz	28	-56	25	-51	1	-3	2	-2
13	MF	(Hungary) HUN	Tamás Kecskés	31	0	26	0	3	0	2	0
14	FW	(Hungary) HUN	Szabolcs Pál	35	7	26	5	5	2	4	0
15	DF	(Hungary) HUN	Marcell Fodor	27	0	17	0	4	0	6	0
16	DF	(Serbia) SRB	Stefan Deák	20	0	14	0	4	0	2	0
17	MF	(Hungary) HUN	Tamás Nagy	16	1	13	1	2	0	1	0
18	DF	(Hungary) HUN	András Gál	27	0	23	0	1	0	3	0
20	MF	(Hungary) HUN	Tibor Nyári	25	2	20	2	3	0	2	0
21	DF	(Hungary) HUN	Zoltán Kiss	5	0	4	0	1	0	0	0
23	MF	(Hungary) HUN	Attila Menyhárt	6	0	6	0	0	0	0	0
24	DF	(Hungary) HUN	Noel Fülöp	4	0	2	0	0	0	2	0
28	DF	(Hungary) HUN	Zsolt Kiss	4	0	4	0	0	0	0	0
29	MF	(Hungary) HUN	Norbert Mokánszki	3	0	2	0	1	0	0	0
Youth players:
19	DF	(Hungary) HUN	Szilárd Pécseli	7	0	0	0	3	0	4	0
22	MF	(Hungary) HUN	László Tulok	2	0	0	0	1	0	1	0
27	MF	(Hungary) HUN	Gellért Mester	2	0	0	0	1	0	1	0
29	DF	(Hungary) HUN	András László	1	0	0	0	1	0	0	0
Players no longer at the club:
2	DF	(Hungary) HUN	József Mogyorósi	17	1	12	0	1	0	4	1
6	MF	(Hungary) HUN	Tamás Egerszegi	16	1	10	0	2	0	4	1
10	MF	(Hungary) HUN	Norbert Sipos	15	1	9	1	2	0	4	0
12	GK	(Hungary) HUN	Zoltán Szatmári	4	-8	4	-8	0	0	0	0
21	DF	(Hungary) HUN	Dániel Lengyel	2	0	2	0	0	0	0	0
21	FW	(Hungary) HUN	Balázs Zamostny	16	2	10	1	3	0	3	1
23	MF	(Serbia) SRB	Milan Cokić	10	1	3	0	2	1	5	0
25	FW	(Hungary) HUN	Marcell Molnár	16	0	8	0	4	0	4	0
29	MF	(Slovakia) SVK	Marián Sluka	9	2	5	0	2	1	2	1

=== Top scorers ===
Includes all competitive matches. The list is sorted by shirt number when total goals are equal.

Last updated on 2 June 2013

Position	Nation	Number	Name	OTP Bank Liga	Hungarian Cup	League Cup	Total
1	(Hungary)	5	Vilmos Melczer	7	0	0	7
2	(Hungary)	14	Szabolcs Pál	5	2	0	7
3	(Bosnia and Herzegovina)	9	Jusuf Dajić	4	2	0	6
4	(Hungary)	20	Tibor Nyári	2	0	0	2
5	(Hungary)	10	János Máté	2	0	0	2
6	(Hungary)	2	Krisztián Timár	2	0	0	2
7	(Hungary)	11	Máté Kiss	2	0	0	2
8	(Hungary)	8	József Windecker	2	0	0	2
9	(Hungary)	3	Zsolt Fehér	1	1	0	2
10	(Hungary)	21	Balázs Zamostny	1	0	1	2
11	(Slovakia)	29	Marián Sluka	0	1	1	2
12	(Hungary)	10	Norbert Sipos	1	0	0	1
13	(Hungary)	17	Tamás Nagy	1	0	0	1
14	(Hungary)	6	Zoltán Takács	1	0	0	1
15	(Serbia)	23	Milan Cokić	0	1	0	1
16	(Hungary)	2	József Mogyorósi	0	0	1	1
17	(Hungary)	6	Tamás Egerszegi	0	0	1	1
18	(Hungary)	7	Bence Horváth	0	0	1	1
/	/	/	Own Goals	0	0	0	0
			TOTALS	31	7	5	43

=== Disciplinary record ===
Includes all competitive matches. Players with 1 card or more included only.

Last updated on 2 June 2013

Position	Nation	Number	Name	OTP Bank Liga		Hungarian Cup		League Cup		Total (Hu Total)	
Position	Nation	Number	Name	Booked	Sent off (straight red)	Booked	Sent off (straight red)	Booked	Sent off (straight red)	Booked	Sent off (straight red)
DF	(Hungary)	2	Krisztián Timár	1	1	1	0	0	0	2 (1)	1 (1)
DF	(Hungary)	2	József Mogyorósi	4	1	0	0	1	0	5 (4)	1 (1)
DF	(Hungary)	3	Zsolt Fehér	3	0	1	0	0	0	4 (3)	0 (0)
DF	(Hungary)	4	András Fejes	1	1	0	0	0	1	1 (1)	2 (1)
MF	(Hungary)	5	Vilmos Melczer	2	0	0	0	0	0	2 (2)	0 (0)
DF	(Hungary)	6	Zoltán Takács	4	1	0	0	0	0	4 (4)	1 (1)
MF	(Hungary)	6	Tamás Egerszegi	0	0	1	0	0	0	1 (0)	0 (0)
MF	(Hungary)	8	József Windecker	7	0	1	0	1	0	9 (7)	0 (0)
FW	(Bosnia and Herzegovina)	9	Jusuf Dajić	4	0	0	0	0	0	4 (4)	0 (0)
FW	(Hungary)	10	János Máté	2	1	1	0	0	0	3 (2)	1 (1)
MF	(Hungary)	10	Norbert Sipos	1	0	0	0	0	0	1 (1)	0 (0)
MF	(Hungary)	11	Máté Kiss	0	0	2	0	0	0	2 (0)	0 (0)
MF	(Hungary)	13	Tamás Kecskés	10	0	1	0	0	0	11 (10)	0 (0)
FW	(Hungary)	14	Szabolcs Pál	11	0	1	0	1	0	13 (11)	0 (0)
DF	(Hungary)	15	Marcell Fodor	2	0	0	0	0	0	2 (2)	0 (0)
DF	(Serbia)	16	Stefan Deák	3	1	1	0	0	0	4 (3)	1 (1)
MF	(Hungary)	17	Tamás Nagy	1	0	0	0	0	0	1 (1)	0 (0)
DF	(Hungary)	18	András Gál	8	0	0	0	2	0	10 (8)	0 (0)
DF	(Hungary)	19	Szilárd Pécseli	0	0	1	0	0	0	1 (0)	0 (0)
MF	(Hungary)	20	Tibor Nyári	1	0	1	0	0	0	2 (1)	0 (0)
DF	(Hungary)	21	Zoltán Kiss	0	0	0	1	0	0	0 (0)	1 (0)
FW	(Hungary)	21	Balázs Zamostny	2	0	0	0	0	0	2 (2)	0 (0)
DF	(Hungary)	21	Dániel Lengyel	1	0	0	0	0	0	1 (1)	0 (0)
FW	(Hungary)	25	Marcell Molnár	1	0	0	0	2	0	3 (1)	0 (0)
DF	(Hungary)	28	Zsolt Kiss	1	0	0	0	0	0	1 (1)	0 (0)
MF	(Slovakia)	29	Marián Sluka	1	0	0	0	0	0	1 (1)	0 (0)
			TOTALS	71	6	12	1	7	1	90 (71)	8 (6)

=== Overall ===
Games played	42 (30 OTP Bank Liga, 6 Hungarian Cup and 6 Hungarian League Cup)
Games won	12 (7 OTP Bank Liga, 4 Hungarian Cup and 1 Hungarian League Cup)
Games drawn	7 (4 OTP Bank Liga, 0 Hungarian Cup and 3 Hungarian League Cup)
Games lost	23 (19 OTP Bank Liga, 2 Hungarian Cup and 2 Hungarian League Cup)
Goals scored	43
Goals conceded	74
Goal difference	-31
Yellow cards	90
Red cards	8
Worst discipline	(Hungary) Szabolcs Pál (13 (yellow card) , 0 (red card) )
Best result	3–0 (H) v Diósgyőri VTK – OTP Bank Liga – 16-04-2013
Worst result	0–6 (A) v Videoton FC – OTP Bank Liga – 29-03-2013
Most appearances	(Hungary) Szabolcs Pál (35 appearances)
Top scorer	(Hungary) Szabolcs Pál (7 goals)
Top scorer	(Hungary) Vilmos Melczer (7 goals)
Points	43/126 (34.13%)

Last updated: 2 June 2013

== Nemzeti Bajnokság I ==
=== Matches ===
29 July 2012 1	Siófok	0–1	Budapest Honvéd	Siófok, Somogy County
17:00 CEST		(Report)	Ignjatović 79'	Stadium: Révész Street Stadium; Attendance: 1,000; Referee: (Hungary) Szabolcs Szilasi

3 August 2012 2	Eger	1–1	Siófok	Budapest, Pest County
19:00 CEST	Dobrić 60'	(Report)	Sipos 21'	Stadium: Stadion Rudolf Illovszky; Attendance: 1,000; Referee: (Hungary) János Takács

10 August 2012 3	Siófok	0–3	Szombathely	Siófok, Somogy County
19:00 CEST		(Report)	Radó 3'; Iszlai 29' (pen.); Kenesei 76'	Stadium: Révész Street Stadium; Attendance: 1,000; Referee: (Hungary) Balázs Berke

18 August 2012 4	Siófok	2–3	Győr	Siófok, Somogy County
20:45 CEST	Dajić 2'; Nyári 87'	(Report)	Varga 23'; Kamber 57', 90'	Stadium: Révész Street Stadium; Attendance: 2,500; Referee: (Hungary) Mihály Fábián

25 August 2012 5	Diósgyőr	2–1	Siófok	Miskolc, Borsod-Abaúj-Zemplén County
20:45 CEST	Fernando 54'; Bacsa 67'	(Report)	Pál 21'	Stadium: DVTK Stadion; Attendance: 8,000; Referee: (Hungary) József Berger

2 September 2012 6	Siófok	1–3	Videoton	Siófok, Somogy County
18:30 CEST	Zamostny 84'	(Report)	Haraszti 14'; Mitrović 77'; Oliveira 89'	Stadium: Révész Street Stadium; Attendance: 1,800; Referee: (Hungary) Viktor Kassai

15 September 2012 7	Paks	4–1	Siófok	Paks, Tolna County
16:00 CEST	Vayer 73'; Simon 74', 79', 87'	(Report)	Pál 90+2' (pen.)	Stadium: Stadion PSE; Attendance: 1,500; Referee: (Hungary) Szabolcs Szilasi

23 September 2012 8	Siófok	0–0	Ferencváros	Siófok, Somogy County
18:30 CEST		(Report)		Stadium: Révész Street Stadium; Attendance: 1,500; Referee: (Hungary) János Takács

28 September 2012 9	MTK Budapest	1–1	Siófok	Budapest, Pest County
19:00 CEST	Kanta 81'	(Report)	Kiss 58'	Stadium: Hidegkuti Nándor Stadium; Attendance: 800; Referee: (Hungary) Tamás Bognár

7 October 2012 10	Siófok	0–2	Debrecen	Siófok, Somogy County
18:30 CEST		(Report)	Coulibaly 33' (pen.); Bódi 62'	Stadium: Révész Street Stadium; Attendance: 500; Referee: (Hungary) Ádám Radványi

20 October 2012 11	Kaposvár	3–0	Siófok	Kaposvár, Somogy County
16:00 CEST	Kovács 40'; Diallo 71', 80'	(Report)		Stadium: Stadion Kaposvár Rákóczi; Attendance: 1,800; Referee: (Hungary) István Vad

26 October 2012 12	Siófok	0–2	Kecskemét	Siófok, Somogy County
17:00 CEST		(Report)	Salami 31'; Patvaros 58'	Stadium: Révész Street Stadium; Attendance: 150; Referee: (Hungary) Gábor Oláh

3 November 2012 13	Pécs	2–1	Siófok	Pécs, Baranya County
16:00 CET	Bajzát 30'; Okoronkwo 79'	(Report)	Pál 17'	Stadium: Stadion PMFC; Attendance: 1,500; Referee: (Hungary) Gergely Szőts

9 November 2012 14	Siófok	1–0	Pápa	Siófok, Somogy County
19:00 CET	Nyári 8'	(Report)		Stadium: Révész Street Stadium; Attendance: 300; Referee: (Hungary) József Erdős

16 November 2012 15	Újpest	4–2	Siófok	Budapest, Pest County
19:00 CET	Moraes 27'; Kabát 64', 90+1'; Antón 84'	(Report)	Melczer 20', 37'	Stadium: Szusza Ferenc Stadium; Attendance: 3,000; Referee: (Hungary) Viktor Kassai

23 November 2012 16	Budapest Honvéd	2–0	Siófok	Budapest, Pest County
18:30 CET	Tandia 68'; Délczeg 90+2' (pen.)	(Report)		Stadium: Bozsik Stadion; Attendance: 500; Referee: (Hungary) Balázs Böcskei

1 December 2012 17	Siófok	4–3	Eger	Siófok, Somogy County
16:00 CET	Melczer 10' (pen.), 76' (pen.), 88' (pen.); Dajić 64'	(Report)	Horváth 53'; Albert 58'; Németh 68'	Stadium: Révész Street Stadium; Attendance: 200; Referee: (Hungary) Zoltán Iványi

2 March 2013 18	Szombathelyi Haladás	2–1	Siófok	Szombathely, Vas County
16:00 CET	Iszlai 69' (pen.); Halmosi 77' (pen.)	(Report)	Nagy 38'	Stadium: Stadion Rohonci Út; Attendance: 2,247; Referee: (Hungary) Gábor Oláh

9 March 2013 19	Győr	2–1	Siófok	Győr, Győr-Moson-Sopron County
18:30 CET	Trajković 39', 61'	(Report)	Máté 65'	Stadium: ETO Park; Attendance: 4,000; Referee: (Hungary) Ádám Radványi

16 April 2013 20	Siófok	3–0	Diósgyőr	Siófok, Somogy County
16:00 CEST	Dajić 23'; Fehér 58'; Máté 74'	(Report)		Stadium: Révész Street Stadium; Attendance: 150; Referee: (Hungary) Tamás Bognár

29 March 2013 21	Videoton	6–0	Siófok	Székesfehérvár, Fejér County
19:00 CET	Mitrović 60'; Nikolić 67' (pen.), 84'; Gyurcsó 77'; Juhász 90'; Oliveira 90+3'	(Report)		Stadium: Stadion Sóstói; Attendance: 1,600; Referee: (Hungary) István Vad

6 April 2013 22	Siófok	1–1	Paks	Siófok, Somogy County
14:00 CEST	Pál 23'	(Report)	Lázok 28'	Stadium: Révész Street Stadium; Attendance: 200; Referee: (Hungary) Péter Solymosi

13 April 2013 23	Ferencváros	4–2	Siófok	Budapest, Pest County
16:30 CEST	Böde 11', 54', 65'; Leonardo 89'	(Report)	Timár 27'; Melczer 72'	Stadium: Stadion Puskás Ferenc; Attendance: 5,500; Referee: (Hungary) József Erdős

19 April 2013 24	Siófok	2–1	MTK Budapest	Siófok, Somogy County
17:00 CEST	Pál 77'; Timár 90+2'	(Report)	Tischler 62'	Stadium: Révész Street Stadium; Attendance: 150; Referee: (Hungary) Ádám Németh

27 April 2013 25	Debrecen	4–1	Siófok	Debrecen, Hajdú-Bihar County
18:30 CEST	Sidibe 2'; Coulibaly 25', 44', 53'	(Report)	Dajić 62'	Stadium: Stadion Oláh Gábor Út; Attendance: 3,000; Referee: (Hungary) Tamás Bognár

4 May 2013 26	Siófok	2–1	Kaposvár	Siófok, Somogy County
18:30 CEST	Windecker 15'; Melczer 56'	(Report)	Oláh 31' (pen.)	Stadium: Révész Street Stadium; Attendance: 500; Referee: (Hungary) Gergely Szőts

11 May 2013 27	Kecskemét	3–1	Siófok	Kecskemét, Bács-Kiskun County
14:00 CEST	Burgos 14'; Mohl 49'; Salami 68'	(Report)	Kiss 53'	Stadium: Széktói Stadion; Attendance: 2,000; Referee: (Hungary) Mihály Fábián

18 May 2013 28	Siófok	1–0	Pécs	Siófok, Somogy County
16:00 CEST	Windecker 70'	(Report)		Stadium: Révész Street Stadium; Attendance: 400; Referee: (Hungary) Gábor Oláh

24 May 2013 29	Pápa	0–1	Siófok	Pápa, Veszprém County
19:00 CEST		(Report)	Takács 57'	Stadium: Stadion Várkerti; Attendance: 2,000; Referee: (Hungary) István Vad

2 June 2013 30	Siófok	0–1	Újpest	Siófok, Somogy County
16:30 CEST		(Report)	Zamostny 90'	Stadium: Révész Street Stadium; Attendance: 2,200; Referee: (Hungary) Ádám Farkas

=== Classification ===
Pos	Team	Pld	W	D	L	GF	GA	GD	Pts	Qualification or relegation
12	Pécs	30	10	7	13	33	44	−11	37	
13	Paks	30	8	11	11	40	38	+2	35	
14	Pápa	30	7	7	16	26	46	−20	28	
15	Siófok (R)	30	7	4	19	31	61	−30	25	Relegation to Nemzeti Bajnokság II
16	Eger (R)	30	3	6	21	25	67	−42	15	Relegation to Nemzeti Bajnokság II

Source: mlsz.hu (in Hungarian)
Rules for classification: 1st points; 2nd overall wins; 3rd goal difference; 4th head-to-head points; 5th head-to-head goal difference; 6th head-to-head away goals scored; 7th fair-play points; 8th drawing of lots
(R) Relegated

=== Results summary ===
Overall								Home						Away					
Pld	W	D	L	GF	GA	GD	Pts	W	D	L	GF	GA	GD	W	D	L	GF	GA	GD
30	7	4	19	31	61	−30	25	6	2	7	17	21	−4	1	2	12	14	40	−26

Last updated: 2 June 2013.
Source: NB1

=== Results by round ===
Round	1	2	3	4	5	6	7	8	9	10	11	12	13	14	15	16	17	18	19	20	21	22	23	24	25	26	27	28	29	30
Ground	H	A	H	H	A	H	A	H	A	H	A	H	A	H	A	A	H	A	A	H	A	H	A	H	A	H	A	H	A	H
Result	L	D	L	L	L	L	L	D	D	L	L	L	L	W	L	L	W	L	L	W	L	D	L	W	L	W	L	W	W	L
Position	12	13	16	16	16	16	16	16	16	16	16	16	16	16	16	16	16	16	16	15	15	15	15	15	15	15	15	15	15	15

Updated to match(es) played on 2 June 2013. Source: Matches
A = Away; H = Home; W = Win; D = Draw; L = Loss

== Hungarian Cup ==
19 September 2012 Round 2	Budaörs	0–1	Siófok	Budaörs, Pest County
15:30 CEST		(Report)	Pál 27'	Stadium: Árok utcai pálya Attendance: 100; Referee: (Hungary) Tibor Farkas

31 October 2012 Round 3	Felsőtárkány	0–1	Siófok	Felsőtárkány, Heves County
12:30 CET		(Report)	Sluka 56'	Stadium: Városi Sporttelep; Attendance: 250; Referee: (Hungary) Tibor Gyarmati

21 November 2012 Round of 16 (1st leg)	Dunaújváros	2–1	Siófok	Dunaújváros, Fejér County
13:00 CET	Böőr 19'; Kocsis 74'	(Report)	Cokić 50'	Stadium: Dunaferr Arena; Attendance: 300; Referee: (Hungary) Norbert Kiss

27 November 2012 Round of 16 (2nd leg)	Siófok	1–0 ((a) 2 – 2 agg.)	Dunaújváros	Siófok, Somogy County
13:00	Dajić 41'	(Report)		Stadium: Révész Street Stadium; Attendance: 100; Referee: (Hungary) József Erdős

23 February 2013 Quarter-final (1st leg)	Vasas	3–1	Siófok	Budapest, Pest County
14:00 CET	Nikolov 37' (pen.), 56' (pen.); Popovics 64'	(Report)	Pál 83' (pen.)	Stadium: Stadion Rudolf Illovszky; Attendance: 0 Referee: (Hungary) Péter Solymosi

27 February 2013 Quarter-final (2nd leg)	Siófok	2–1 (3–4 agg.)	Vasas	Siófok, Somogy County
13:00	Fehér 57'; Dajić 66'	(Report)	Bobô 62'	Stadium: Révész Street Stadium; Attendance: 0 Referee: (Hungary) Mihály Fábián

== League Cup ==
=== Group stage ===
5 September 2012 1	Siófok	0–1	Vasas	Siófok, Somogy County
17:30 CEST		(Report)	André Luis 9'	Stadium: Révész Street Stadium; Attendance: 100; Referee: (Hungary) Gábor Oláh

8 September 2012 2	Pécs	1–1	Siófok	Pécs, Baranya County
18:00 CEST	Nagy 78'	(Report)	Zamostny 51'	Stadium: Stadion PMFC; Attendance: 300; Referee: (Hungary) Gyöngyi Gaál

10 October 2012 3	Siófok	0–0	Paks	Siófok, Somogy County
15:00 CEST		(Report)		Stadium: Révész Street Stadium; Attendance: 100; Referee: (Hungary) Csaba Pintér

13 October 2012 4	Paks	1–1	Siófok	Paks, Tolna County
14:00 CEST	Lázok 76'	(Report)	Sluka 26'	Stadium: Stadion PSE; Attendance: 150; Referee: (Hungary) Gergely Szőts

13 November 2012 5	Siófok	1–4	Pécs	Siófok, Somogy County
17:00 CET	Mogyorósi 29'	(Report)	Szatmári 6'; Okoronkwo 20'; Grumić 54', 75'	Stadium: Révész Street Stadium; Attendance: 200; Referee: (Hungary) Szabolcs Szilasi

5 December 2012 6	Vasas	0–2	Siófok	Budapest, Pest County
15:00 CET		(Report)	Egerszegi 53'; Horváth 70'	Stadium: Stadion Rudolf Illovszky; Attendance: 200; Referee: (Hungary) Ádám Farkas

==== Classification ====
Pos	Team	Pld	W	D	L	GF	GA	GD	Pts	Qualification
1	Pécs	6	3	2	1	11	6	+5	11	Advance to knockout phase
2	Paks	6	2	2	2	7	6	+1	8	
3	Vasas	6	2	1	3	5	9	−4	7	
4	Siófok	6	1	3	2	5	7	−2	6	

Rules for classification: 1) points; 2) goal difference; 3) number of goals scored.
