= Palko =

Palko or Palkó is an Eastern European surname and male given name. Notable people with this name include:

- Christian Palko, better known as Cage (rapper) (born 1973), American rapper and actor
- Dávid Palkó (born 1989), Hungarian football player
- Franz Xaver Palko (1724-1767), Silesian painter
- Fruzsina Palkó (born 1992), Hungarian handball player
- Jiří Palko (1941–2014), Czech rower
- Palkó Dárdai (born 1999), German-Hungarian football player
- Tyler Palko (born 1983), American football player
- Vladimír Palko (born 1957), Slovak politician
