= Attila Rajnay =

Association football playerHungarian footballer

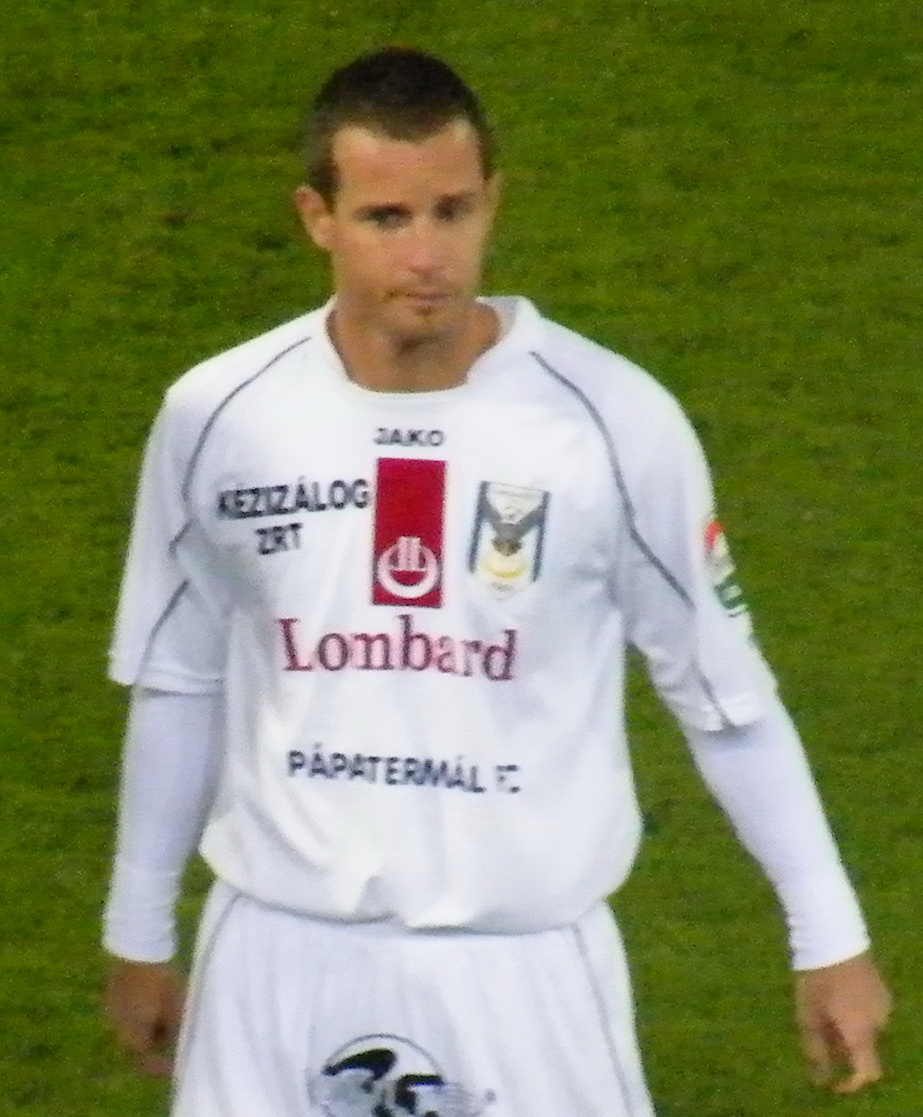

Personal information
- Full name: Attila Rajnay
- Date of birth: 3 June 1979 (age 47)
- Place of birth: Budapest, Hungary
- Height: 1.78 m (5 ft 10 in)
- Position: Left-back

Youth career
- 1996–1999: Ferencvárosi TC

Senior career*
| Years | Team | Apps | (Gls) |
| 1999–2000 | III. Kerület | 30 | (1) |
| 2000–2002 | Fót | | |
| 2002–2003 | Százhalombatta | 18 | (4) |
| 2003–2007 | Tatabánya | 72 | (2) |
| 2007–2011 | Lombard-Pápa | 83 | (1) |
| 2011–2013 | Újbuda | 30 | (3) |
| 2013–2016 | Budaörs | 68 | (4) |
- * Club domestic league appearances and goals

Attila Rajnay (born 3 June 1979 in Budapest) is a retired Hungarian football player.
