= Stefan Deak =

Serbian footballer

Stefan Deak Стефан Деак
Personal information
- Full name: István Deák
- Date of birth: 23 March 1991 (age 35)
- Place of birth: Ruma, FR Yugoslavia
- Height: 1.91 m (6 ft 3 in)
- Position: Centre back

Team information
- Current team: Mosonmagyaróvár
- Number: 55

Youth career
- Vojvodina

Senior career*
Years	Team	Apps	(Gls)
2009	Veternik	2	(0)
2010	Spartak Nalchik	0	(0)
2011–2014	Deportivo B	60	(0)
2012	→ Hapoel Rishon LeZion (loan)	11	(1)
2012–2013	→ Siófok (loan)	24	(0)
2013–2014	Deportivo La Coruña	5	(0)
2016–2017	Mosonmagyaróvár	48	(5)
2017	Honvéd Budapest	12	(0)
2017	Honvéd Budapest II	2	(0)
2019	Napredak Kruševac	6	(3)
2019	MTK Budapest	1	(0)
2019–2021	Szeged-Csanád	32	(2)
2021–	Mosonmagyaróvár	92	(4)

International career
2009	Serbia U19	16	(0)
- * Club domestic league appearances and goals as of 14 June 2024

Stefan Deak (Serbian Cyrillic: Стефан Деак, Hungarian: Deák István; born 23 March 1991) is a Serbian footballer who plays as a central defender in Hungary for Mosonmagyaróvár.

== Club career ==
Deák made his senior debuts with local FK Veternik in 2009. In January 2010, he signed with PFC Spartak Nalchik, being assigned #23 jersey. However, he failed to appear with the club, only being on the bench in a match against FC Zenit Saint Petersburg on 3 October.

On 21 January 2011, Deák signed a four-and-a-half-year deal with Deportivo de La Coruña, being assigned to the reserves. However, after a below-average debut and struggling with muscular injuries, he was loaned to Hapoel Rishon LeZion F.C. in July 2012, later joining BFC Siófok, also on loan.

In June 2013, Deák was called up to Depor first team, taking part of the club's pre-season squad. On 12 September, he finally made his debut with the main squad, starting and being sent off in a 2–2 draw against Córdoba CF for the season's Copa del Rey.

On 27 August 2014 Deák rescinded his link with the Galicians.
