= András Dlusztus =

Hungarian footballer

Personal information
- Date of birth: 22 July 1988 (age 38)
- Place of birth: Szeged, Hungary
- Height: 1.88 m (6 ft 2 in)
- Position: Defender

Youth career
- 2000–2003: Tisza Volán SC

Senior career*
Years	Team	Apps	(Gls)
2003–2006	Tisza Volán SC		
2004–2005	→ Makó FC (loan)	1	(0)
2006–2007	Fortaleza EC		
2007	Fluminense B		
2007–2008	FC Sopron	7	(0)
2008–2014	Lombard-Pápa TFC	76	(1)
2014–2015	SZEOL	24	(0)
2015–2019	Vác FC	69	(4)
2017–2018	→ Békéscsaba (loan)	29	(0)
2019–2022	Dorog	90	(7)
- * Club domestic league appearances and goals

András Dlusztus (born 22 July 1988) is a Hungarian former football player.
