= Tamás Germán =

Hungarian footballer

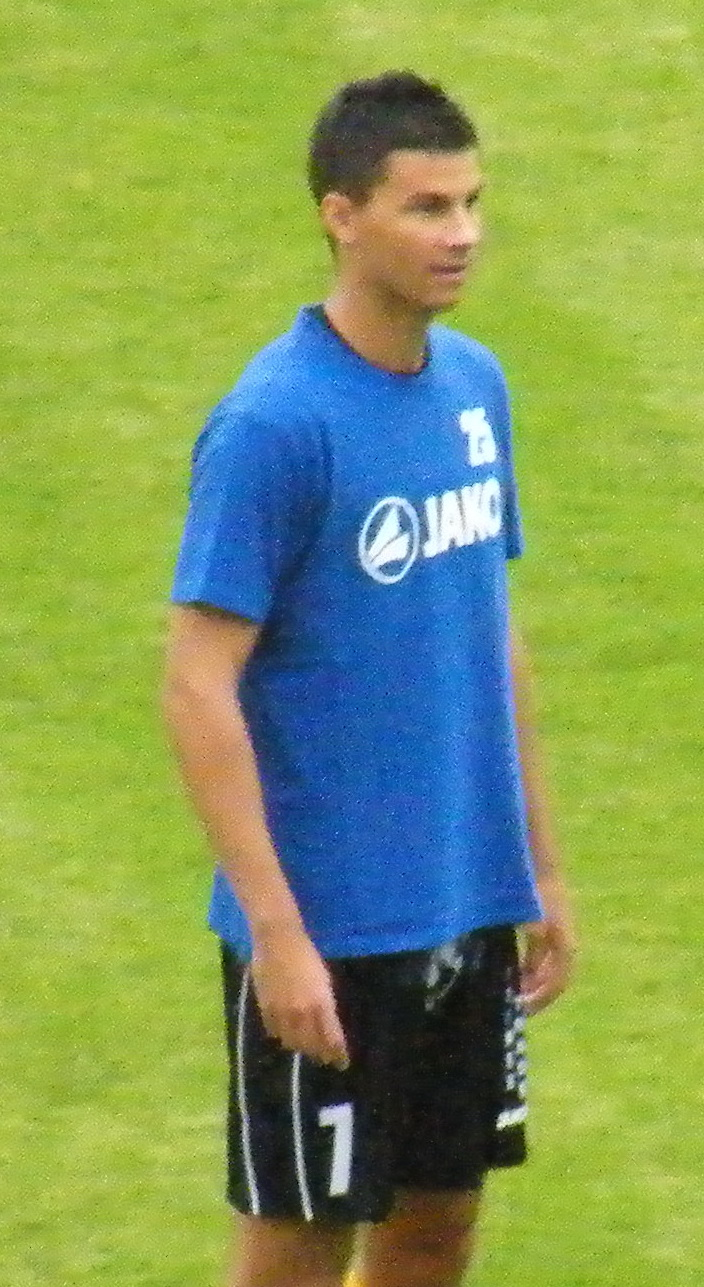

Personal information
- Date of birth: 26 March 1987 (age 39)
- Place of birth: Gyula, Hungary
- Position: Striker

Youth career
- 2002–2005: Békéscsaba

Senior career*
Years	Team	Apps	(Gls)
2005–2007	Békéscsaba		(1)
2006–2007	→ Gyulai Termál FC (loan)	11	(7)
2007–2012	Pápa	45	(6)
2009	→ Szolnok (loan)	14	(6)
2009–2010	→ Emmen (loan)	11	(0)
2011	→ Nyíregyháza (loan)	10	(2)
2012–2013	Nyíregyháza	33	(8)
2013–2022	Szeged-Csanád	243	(83)
- * Club domestic league appearances and goals

Tamás Germán (born 26 March 1987) is a Hungarian former professional footballer who played as a striker.
