= David Abwo =

Nigerian footballer (born 1986)

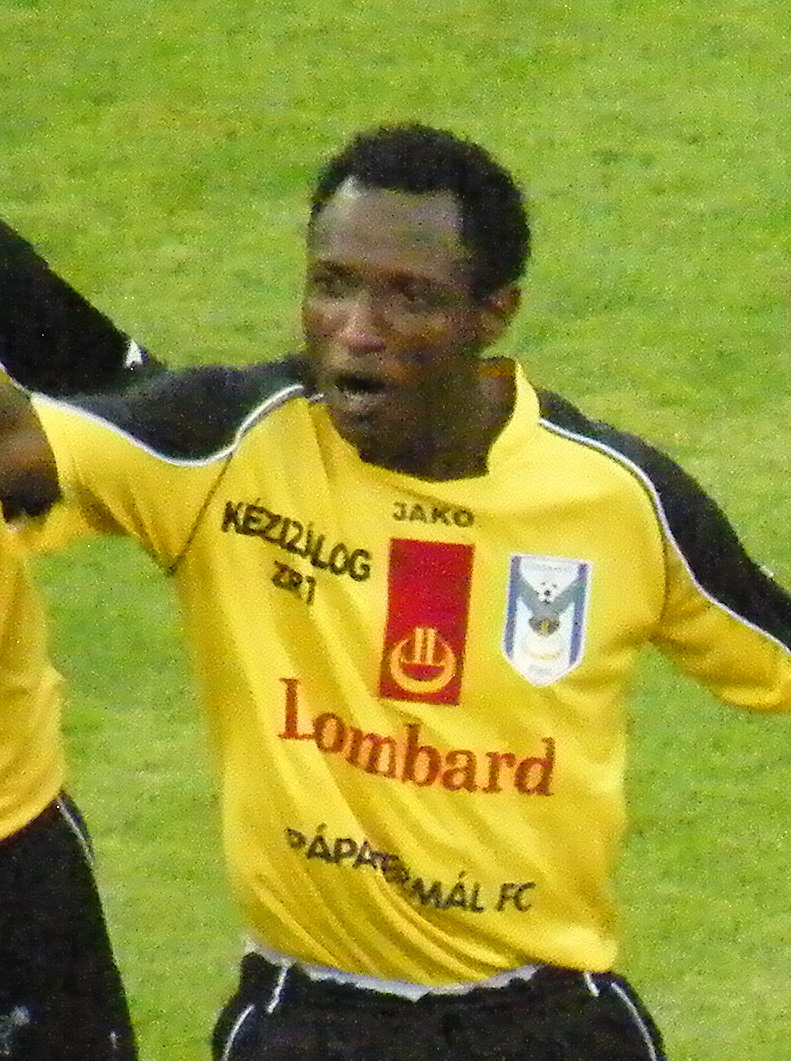
- Abwo with Lombard Pápa in 2010

Personal information
- Full name: David Solomon Abwo
- Date of birth: 10 May 1986 (age 40)
- Place of birth: Jos, Nigeria
- Height: 1.74 m (5 ft 9 in)
- Position: Midfielder

Senior career*
Years	Team	Apps	(Gls)
2004–2005	Enyimba		
2006	Gençlerbirliği	6	(0)
2006–2008	Dijon	13	(1)
2008–2010	US Créteil	51	(9)
2010–2011	Lombard Pápa	29	(7)
2011	→ Zagłębie Lubin (loan)	15	(1)
2011–2014	Zagłębie Lubin	60	(7)
2014	LZS Piotrówka	0	(0)
2014–2017	Giresunspor	95	(3)
2017–2018	Ceyhanspor		
2018	Çetinkaya		

International career
2005	Nigeria U20	7	(1)
Medal record
Men's Football
Representing Nigeria
FIFA U-20 World Cup
Runner-up	2005 Netherlands
- * Club domestic league appearances and goals

David Solomon Abwo (born 10 May 1986) is a Nigerian former professional footballer who played as a midfielder.

== Career ==
Abwo was born in Jos, Nigeria.

In December 2010, he joined Polish club Zagłębie Lubin on a half-year loan from Lombard Pápa.

In 2017 Abwo joined Ceyhanspor.

In January 2018, he moved to KTFF Süper Lig club Çetinkaya in Northern Cyprus.
