= Milan Čokić =

Serbian footballer

Personal information
- Full name: Milan Čokić
- Date of birth: 15 August 1991 (age 35)
- Place of birth: Belgrade, SFR Yugoslavia
- Height: 1.85 m (6 ft 1 in)
- Position: Forward

Youth career
- Mladenovac

Senior career*
Years	Team	Apps	(Gls)
2008–2012	Mladenovac	64	(16)
2012–2013	Kecskemét	0	(0)
2012	→ Siófok (loan)	3	(0)
2013	→ Bajai (loan)	15	(3)
2013–2014	Smederevo	18	(1)
2014–2015	Moravac Mrštane	1	(0)
2015–2016	Ilirija 1911	17	(11)
2016–2017	Sopot		
2020	Besëlidhja Lezhë	6	(0)
- * Club domestic league appearances and goals as of 23 April 2022

Milan Čokić (Serbian Cyrillic: Милан Чокић; born 15 August 1991) is a Serbian professional footballer who plays as a forward.

== Career ==
During his career, Čokić played in four countries, namely Serbia (Mladenovac, Smederevo, Moravac Mrštane, and Sopot), Hungary (Siófok and Bajai, both on loan from Kecskemét), Slovenia (Ilirija 1911), and Albania (Besëlidhja Lezhë).

== Personal life ==
Čokić is the older brother of fellow footballer Dimitrije Čokić.
