= Goran Marić (footballer) =

Serbian footballer

Personal information
- Full name: Goran Marić
- Date of birth: 23 March 1984 (age 42)
- Place of birth: Novi Sad, SFR Yugoslavia
- Height: 1.84 m (6 ft 0 in)
- Position: Striker

Youth career
- 1999–2000: Compostela
- 2000–2001: Barcelona
- 2001–2003: Celta

Senior career*
| Years | Team | Apps | (Gls) |
| 2002–2008 | Celta B | 147 | (52) |
| 2006 | → Las Palmas (loan) | 9 | (0) |
| 2008–2009 | Celta | 1 | (0) |
| 2008–2009 | → Barcelona B (loan) | 34 | (11) |
| 2009 | Norwich City | 0 | (0) |
| 2010 | Real Unión | 9 | (0) |
| 2010–2012 | Lombard-Pápa | 40 | (17) |
| 2012 | Zhetysu | 12 | (1) |
| 2012–2014 | Lombard-Pápa | 32 | (10) |
| Total | | 275 | (91) |
- * Club domestic league appearances and goals

Goran Marić Govorcin (Serbian Cyrillic: Горан Mapић; born 23 March 1984) is a Serbian former footballer who played as a striker.

He spent most of his professional career in Spain, almost exclusively in the lower leagues with Celta de Vigo B.

== Football career ==
=== Early years / Celta ===
Born in Novi Sad, Socialist Federal Republic of Yugoslavia, Marić moved to Spain in his teens, going on to play for three clubs as a youth, including FC Barcelona and RC Celta de Vigo. He made his senior debut with the latter's reserves and scored regularly for the Segunda División B side, notably netting 21 goals in 32 games in the 2007–08 season (best in his group, second overall); however, he only appeared once for the main squad in Segunda División, his output consisting of 30 minutes in a 1–2 home loss against CD Castellón on 2 February 2008.

In 2008–09, Marić was loaned to another team in the third level, FC Barcelona B. In June 2009, he was released by the Galicians.

=== Norwich City ===
Marić joined Norwich City on trial in the summer of 2009, touring with the club during its pre-season in Scotland and scoring twice in three matches, against Airdrie United and St Johnstone. Afterwards, manager Bryan Gunn confirmed he had been impressed well enough to offer the player a contract, with the one-year deal being signed on 30 July.

Marić made his official debut for the Canaries against Yeovil Town, for the campaign's Football League Cup, appearing as a substitute. His first start came in the 2009–10 Football League Trophy against Brentford (1–0 win) but he was almost always fifth-choice during his spell, behind the habitual Grant Holt and Chris Martin but also Jamie Cureton and Cody McDonald; subsequently, he left the side after his link was terminated by mutual consent, on 3 December 2009.

=== Return to Spain / Hungary ===
For the second part of 2009–10, Marić returned to Spain and its division two, signing with Real Unión. He appeared rarely during the season (less than one half of the league matches), also suffering team relegation.

Marić spent the better part of the following years in Hungary, in representation of Lombard-Pápa TFC.

== Personal life ==
Marić's father, Zoran, was also a footballer and a striker. He too spent many years working in Spain, mainly with Celta.
