= Denys Rebryk =

Ukrainian footballer

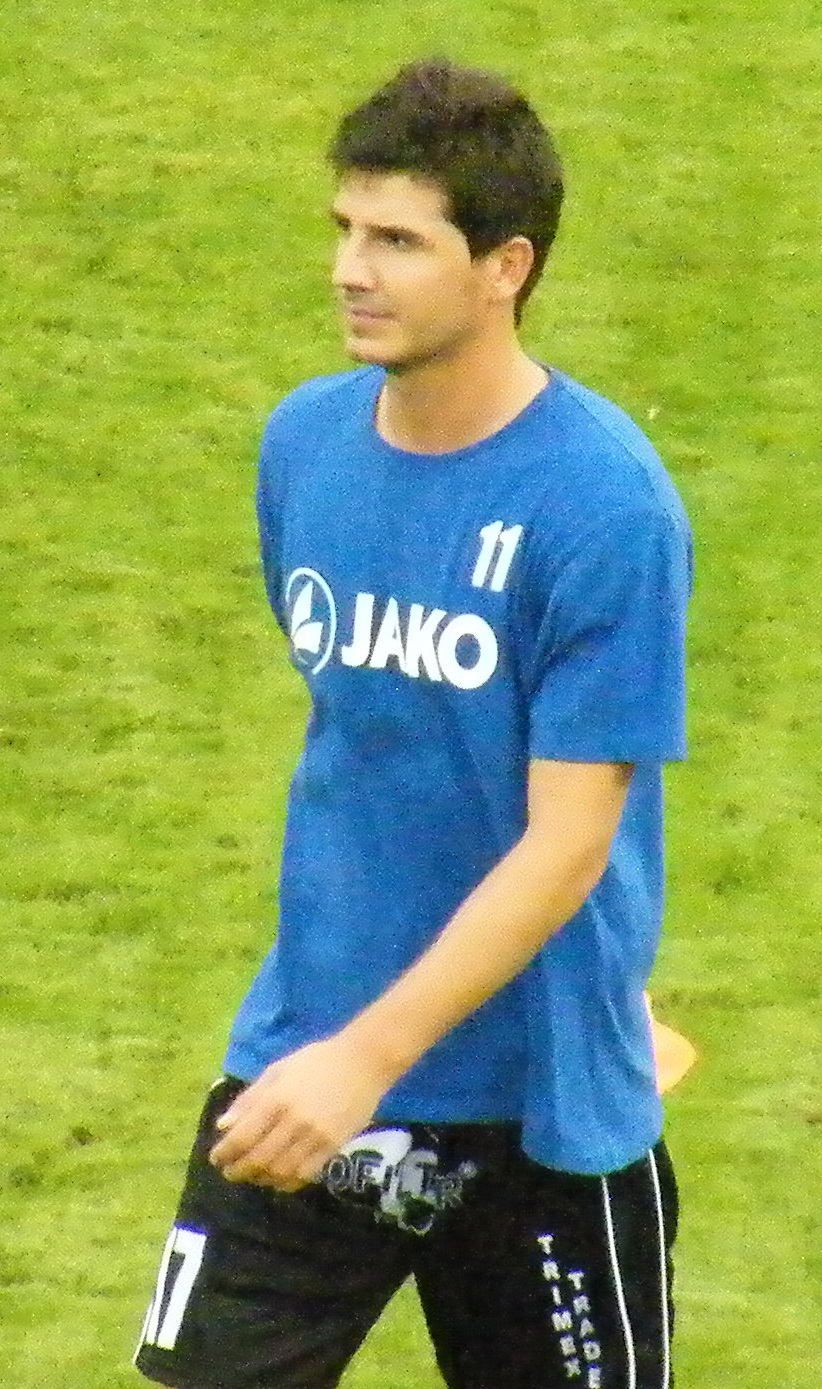

Personal information
- Full name: Denys Rebryk
- Date of birth: 4 April 1985 (age 41)
- Place of birth: Uzhhorod, Ukrainian SSR, Soviet Union
- Height: 1.79 m (5 ft 10 1/2 in)
- Position: Midfielder

Team information
- Current team: Cegléd
- Number: 11

Youth career
- 2001–2002: Uzhhorod
- 2002–2004: Debrecen

Senior career*
Years	Team	Apps	(Gls)
2005–2006	Hatvan	23	(15)
2006–2007	Vasas	13	(1)
2007–2008	Jászberény	13	(2)
2008–2011	Pápa	67	(8)
2011–2012	Siófok	7	(0)
2012–	Cegléd	37	(5)
- * Club domestic league appearances and goals as of 1 June 2014

Denys Rebryk (Ukrainian: Денис Ребрик; born 4 April 1985) is a Ukrainian footballer currently under contract for Hungarian side Ceglédi VSE.
