= Dávid Palkó =

Hungarian footballer

Personal information
- Full name: Dávid Palkó
- Date of birth: 7 February 1989 (age 37)
- Place of birth: Szombathely, Hungary
- Height: 1.80 m (5 ft 11 in)
- Position: Forward

Team information
- Current team: ASK Horitschon-Unterpetersdorf
- Number: 64

Youth career
- 2002–2006: Szombathelyi Haladás
- 2006–2008: FC Sopron

Senior career*
Years	Team	Apps	(Gls)
2008–2010	Videoton FC Fehérvár	0	(0)
2009	→ Felcsút FC (loan)	8	(2)
2010–2011	Lombard-Pápa TFC	1	(0)
2011–2012	SV Mattersburg	3	(0)
2011–2012	→ SV Mattersburg Amateure	18	(3)
2012–	ASK Horitschon-Unterpetersdorf	11	(5)
- * Club domestic league appearances and goals

Dávid Palkó (born 7 February 1989 in Szombathely) is a Hungarian football player who currently plays for ASK Horitschon-Unterpetersdorf.

He played professionally for Videoton FC Fehérvár and Lombard-Pápa TFC in the Nemzeti Bajnokság.
