= Péter Bali =

Hungarian footballer

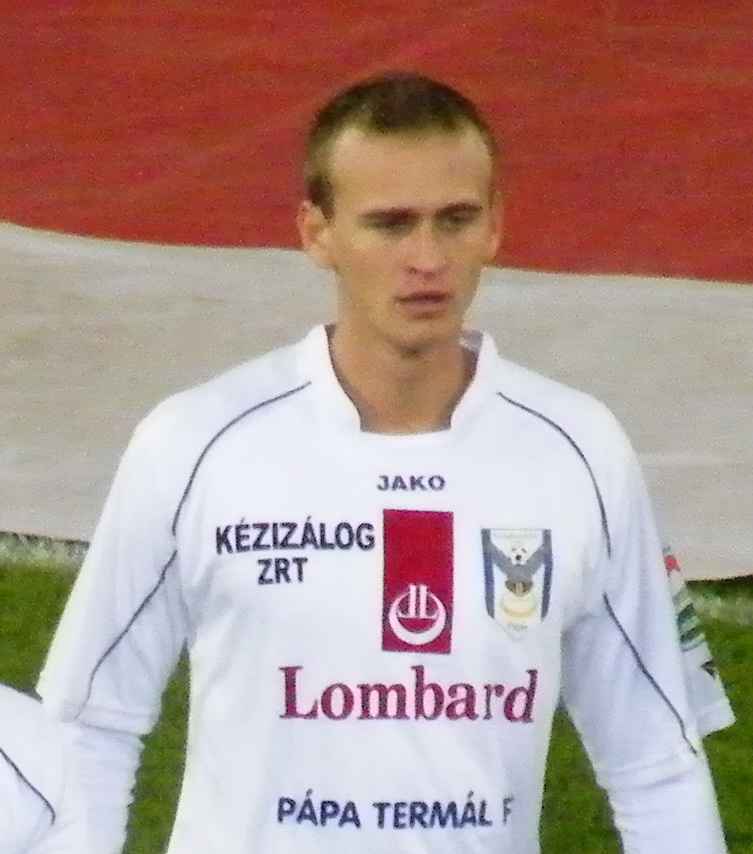

Personal information
- Full name: Péter Bali
- Date of birth: 6 January 1984 (age 42)
- Place of birth: Szeged, Hungary
- Height: 1.88 m (6 ft 2 in)
- Position: Striker

Team information
- Current team: Sopron
- Number: 39

Senior career*
Years	Team	Apps	(Gls)
2002–2005	Szeged	42	(6)
2005–2006	Szolnok	25	(5)
2006–2007	Vasas	14	(1)
2007–2009	Integrál-DAC	41	(14)
2009–2011	Pápa	51	(20)
2011–2012	Siófok	3	(0)
2012	Veszprém	12	(2)
2012–2013	Szigetszentmiklós	29	(5)
2013–	Sopron	4	(1)
- * Club domestic league appearances and goals as of 6 October 2013

Péter Bali (born 6 January 1984 in Szeged) is a Hungarian football player who currently plays for Soproni VSE.
