= Márk Heinrich =

Hungarian footballer

Personal information
- Date of birth: 22 July 1989 (age 37)
- Place of birth: Sopron, Hungary
- Height: 1.85 m (6 ft 1 in)
- Position: Goalkeeper

Team information
- Current team: MTE 1904

Youth career
- 2003–2007: Sopron

Senior career*
Years	Team	Apps	(Gls)
2007–2008	Sopron	0	(0)
2008	ASK Baumgarten	4	(0)
2008–2010	Répcelaki SE	43	(0)
2010–2011	SC Wiesen		
2011–2012	SC Oberpullendorf		
2012–2013	Siófok	3	(0)
2013–2018	Sopron	68	(0)
2018	→ MTE 1904 (loan)	17	(0)
2018–	MTE 1904	154	(0)
- * Club domestic league appearances and goals as of 21 December 2023

Márk Heinrich (born 22 July 1989) is a Hungarian footballer who plays for MTE 1904.
