= Zsolt Kiss =

Hungarian footballer

Personal information
- Full name: Zsolt Kiss
- Date of birth: 21 August 1986 (age 40)
- Place of birth: Győr, Hungary
- Height: 1.90 m (6 ft 3 in)
- Position: Defender

Youth career
- 2003–2006: Győr

Senior career*
Years	Team	Apps	(Gls)
2006–2008	Győr	8	(0)
2006–2007	→ Integrál-DAC (loan)	8	(0)
2008–2011	Gyirmót	68	(0)
2011–2014	Siófok	41	(0)
- * Club domestic league appearances and goals

Zsolt Kiss (born 21 August 1986 in Győr) is a retired Hungarian footballer.
