= Norbert Heffler =

Hungarian footballer

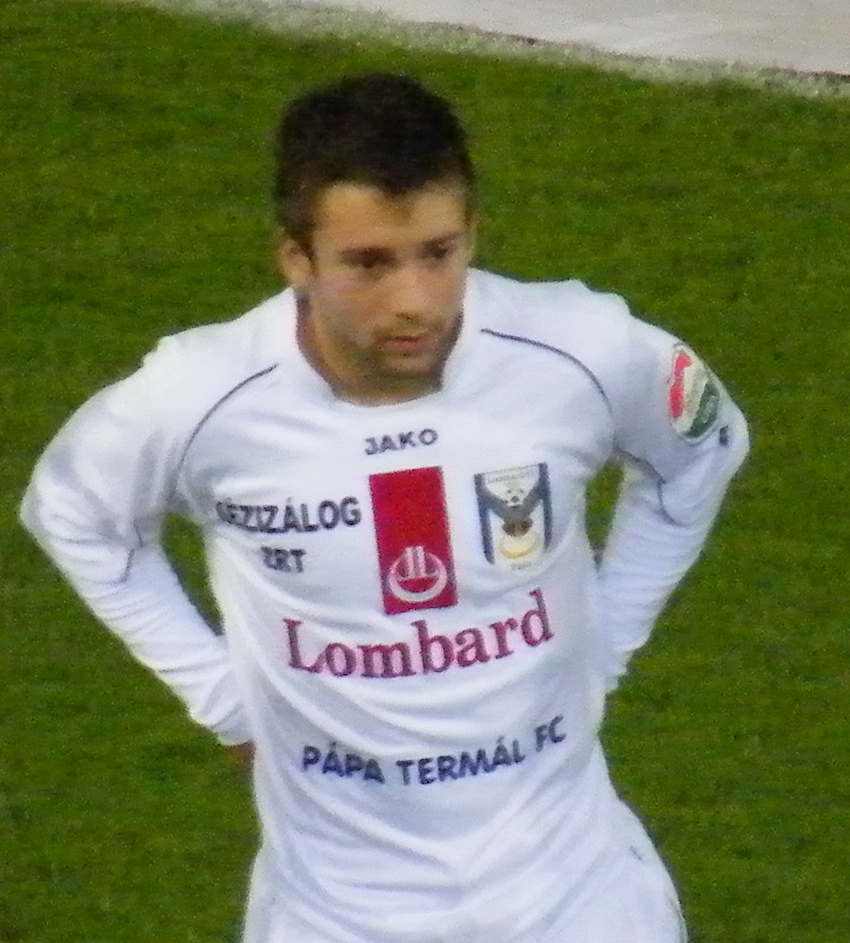

Personal information
- Date of birth: 24 May 1990 (age 36)
- Place of birth: Dunaújváros, Hungary
- Height: 1.78 m (5 ft 10 in)
- Position: Midfielder

Youth career
- 2003–2007: Dunaújváros

Senior career*
Years	Team	Apps	(Gls)
2007–2009	Dunaújváros	38	(9)
2009–2011	Pápa	54	(6)
2011–2014	Paks	28	(1)
2012	→ Siófok (loan)	4	(0)
2014	→ Sopron (loan)	12	(3)
2014–2015	Pécs	12	(1)
2015–2017	Mezőkövesd	25	(8)
2016	→ Nyíregyháza (loan)	10	(0)
2016–2017	→ Balmazújváros (loan)	17	(4)
2017–2018	Kisvárda	20	(1)
2018–2022	Gyirmót	97	(22)
2021	→ Tiszakécske (loan)	13	(4)

International career
2009–2010	Hungary U-19	17	(4)
2010	Hungary U-21	1	(0)
- * Club domestic league appearances and goals as of 12 December 2021

Norbert Heffler (born 24 May 1990) is a Hungarian football player. His brother, Tibor Heffler is also a footballer.
