= List of Rákospalotai EAC players =

Rákospalotai Egyetértés Atlétikai Club is a Hungarian association football club based in Rákospalota, Budapest.

== Players ==
Players are listed in alphabetical order. Appearances and goals include all official competitive matches during each player's tenure with the club. Statistics correct as of 23 May 2026.

Appearances and goals are for first-team competitive matches only, including:

- Nemzeti Bajnokság I, Nemzeti Bajnokság II, Nemzeti Bajnokság III, Megyei Bajnokság I
- Magyar Kupa, Ligakupa, Budapest Kupa
- Magyar Kupa qualification rounds
- Play-off matches

List of Rákospalotai EAC players with at least 50 appearances
Player	Nationality	Position	Rákospalota career	Apps	Goals	Ref.
Bálint Balázs	Hungary	DF	2014–2017; 2018–2019	116	5	
István Bodnár	Hungary	MF	2016–2018	60	17	
Attila Burzi	Hungary	MF	2002–2004	70	4	
Gergő Cseri	Hungary	DF	2004–2011	223	16	
Richárd Csiszár	Hungary		2014–2016	68	21	
Gyula Czene	Hungary	GK	1998–2001	70	0	
Patrik Czimmermann	Hungary	FW	2011–2015; 2016; 2018–2019	63	16	
Roland Dancs	Hungary	MF	2008–2011	110	18	
Balázs Dinka	Hungary	DF	2000–2016	369	2	
Ernő Doma	Hungary		1996–2000	102	8	
Zoltán Dulka	Hungary	GK	2022–2024	55	0	
Balázs Farkas	Hungary	GK	2003–2008	92	0	
István Gál	Hungary	DF	2001–2005	92	0	
Anatoliy Grytsayuk	Ukraine	MF	2000–2002	50	0	
Máté Gulyás	Hungary	MF	2010–2012; 2022–2023	84	7	
Tamás Györök	Hungary	MF	2001–2003	56	13	
László Hajba	Hungary	DF	2000–2004	101	4	
József Havrán	Hungary	FW	2003–2005	50	14	
Attila Honti	Hungary	DF	2012–2014; 2022–2023	57	5	
Gábor Horváth	Hungary	DF	2004–2008	134	3	
Kálmán Horváth	Hungary		2019–2025	131	13	
Krisztián Horváth	Hungary		2019–2023	106	22	
Gábor Hungler	Hungary	DF	2000–2003	61	4	
Gergő Jeremiás	Hungary	MF	2008–2010	63	6	
Vince Kapcsos	Hungary	MF	2004–2010	182	17	
László Karászi	Hungary		1994–2000	170	43	
Dániel Kasza	Hungary	MF	2015–2016; 2017–2019; 2022–2023	115	66	
Patrik Kaszala	Hungary	FW	2019–2025	147	64	
Ádám Kindlik	Hungary		2020–2022	50	10	
Tamás Kiss	Hungary	MF	2006–2010; 2011–2013; 2013–2024	282	71	
András Kőhalmi	Hungary	MF	2002–2004; 2007–2009	125	18	
Zsolt Kollár	Hungary	DF	2012–2017; 2024	154	38	
Attila Kovács	Hungary		1995–1996; 1997–1998	59	15	
Balázs Kovács	Hungary	MF	2003–2011	189	11	
Dániel Kovács	Hungary	MF	2016–2018	60	8	
István Kövesfalvi	Hungary	GK	1995–1996; 2002–2004	57	2	
Dániel Kutai	Hungary		2016–2019	85	13	
Zoltán Lakatos	Hungary		2019–2025	166	32	
Balázs Lászka	Hungary	MF	2014–2018	109	3	
Péter Lendvai	Hungary	MF	2002–2005	75	12	
Dániel Lőrincz	Hungary		2016–2023	95	34	
Viktor Lucz	Hungary	MF	2012–2016	91	14	
Zoltán Máj	Hungary	MF	1999–2003	124	9	
Soma Major	Hungary		2021–2023; 2025–	53	10	
Balázs Máriássy	Hungary		1998–2002	96	17	
István Markóczi	Hungary	FW	1994–1996	71	31	
Marcell Markos	Hungary	DF	2022–2025	75	7	
Attila Menyhárt	Hungary	FW	2010–2012	61	4	
Tamás Micheller	Hungary		2019–2024	137	28	
Gergő Nagy	Hungary		2016–2025	281	33	
Krisztián Nyerges	Hungary	FW	2001–2012	318	109	
Barnabás Oláh	Hungary		2019–2022	69	11	
János Olasz	Hungary	FW	2010–2011; 2012–2013; 2014	51	17	
Dániel Orosházi	Hungary		2019–2021	53	4	
Zsolt Pálmai	Hungary		2013–2017	70	5	
György Papp	Hungary		2015–2018	51	9	
Dávid Pesti	Hungary	DF	2016–2019	89	5	
Erik Pfister	Hungary		2013–2018; 2020–2023	144	10	
Zsolt Podhorszky	Hungary		1996–2001	130	33	
Attila Polonkai	Hungary	MF	2003; 2005–2008	84	11	
Tibor Pomper	Hungary	DF	2003–2004; 2008–2010	58	10	
Balázs Sallai	Hungary	DF	2005–2011	160	2	
Lajos Siteri	Hungary		1993–1998	126	1	
Tamás Somorjai	Hungary	MF	2005–2007; 2008	74	18	
Ádám Strausz	Hungary		1998–2001	58	0	
Zoltán Szabó	Hungary		1994–1998	78	4	
Levente Szántai	Hungary	GK	2007–2009	61	0	
Viktor Szentpéteri	Hungary	GK	2000–2003; 2004–2007; 2011	61	0	
Ferenc Szőcs	Hungary		1993–1999	120	8	
György Szűcs	Hungary		1993–1996	77	9	
Béla Takács	Hungary	DF	1994–1999	122	3	
Gábor Torma	Hungary	FW	2005–2010	156	71	
Sándor Török	Hungary	FW	2005–2007	57	5	
András Tóth	Hungary	DF	1993–1996	57	0	
Dániel Tóth	Hungary	GK	2016–2019	100	0	
Ákos Varga	Hungary		2024–	54	6	
Zoltán Varga	Hungary	FW	2007–2008; 2009–2010	57	12	
János Varró	Hungary		1993–1994; 1995–1996	62	6	
Árpád Veress	Hungary		1993–2000	165	32	
Tibor Virágh	Hungary	DF	1997–2008	230	6	
Tibor Werle	Hungary		1998–2003	146	16	
