= 2008–09 Rákospalotai EAC season =

Rákospalota
2008–09 season
- Owner: József Forgács
- Manager: Zoltán Aczél (until 9 November); Sándor Nagy (caretaker, from 10 November to 16 December); Tamás Hevesi (from 16 December to 30 April); Sándor Nagy (caretaker, from 30 April)
- Stadium: Budai II. László Stadion
- Nemzeti Bajnokság I: 16th (relegated)
- Magyar Kupa: Round of 16
- Ligakupa: Group stage
- Top goalscorer: League: Krisztián Nyerges (9); All: Gábor Torma (13)
Home colours	Away colours

The 2008–09 season was Rákospalotai Egyetértés Atlétikai Club's or shortly REAC's 62nd competitive season, 4th consecutive season in the Nemzeti Bajnokság I and 96th year in existence as a football club. In addition to the domestic league, Rákospalota participated in this season's editions of the Magyar Kupa and Ligakupa.

In the previous season they played their home games in Sopron in the spring, but now they are back as REAC and in their stadium, as the lumination in the facility has been completed. The club started the season under the leadership of Zoltán Aczél, who was sacked after the 5–3 defeat to Honvéd. He got replaced until the end of the year by Sándor Nagy, who managed U-16 team of REAC before. The position could not be kept by him due to lack of UEFA Pro License. The final choice for the position went to Tamás Hevesi, a musician and coach of the Ferencváros women's team. Finally, they accept his resignation after the 4–0 loss against Debrecen and Nagy would be back in charge indefinitely.

The relegation became inevitable for the team due to being in last place almost all season.

== First team squad ==
The players listed had league appearances and stayed until the end of the season.

Note: Flags indicate national team as defined under FIFA eligibility rules; some limited exceptions apply. Players may hold more than one non-FIFA nationality.

No.	Pos.	Nation	Player
1	GK	HUN	Mátyás Esterházy
2	DF	HUN	Balázs Dinka
4	MF	HUN	Ádám Csobánki (on loan from Fehérvár)
5	DF	HUN	Balázs Sallai
6	MF	HUN	András Kőhalmi
7	MF	HUN	Gergő Cseri
8	DF	HUN	Vince Kapcsos
9	MF	HUN	Zoltán Varga (on loan from Debrecen)
10	FW	HUN	Gábor Torma
11	FW	HUN	Krisztián Nyerges
12	GK	HUN	Levente Szántai
13	MF	HUN	Tamás Kiss
14	MF	HUN	Balázs Kovács
15	MF	HUN	Roland Dancs

No.	Pos.	Nation	Player
17	MF	HUN	Ármin Tihanyi
18	MF	HUN	Zoltán Pintér
19	MF	HUN	György Rézmányi
20	MF	HUN	Károly Erős
21	DF	HUN	Árpád Ambrusz (on loan from Nyíregyháza)
22	MF	HUN	Gergő Jeremiás
23	MF	HUN	Gergő Rása
24	MF	HUN	Tamás Hajdú
25	DF	HUN	Tibor Pomper
26	DF	HUN	Tamás Gasparik
27	FW	HUN	Károly Nagy
28	MF	HUN	Dávid Kósa
29	MF	HUN	Attila Héger
33	DF	HUN	Zoltán Kovács (on loan from Győr)

== Transfers ==
=== Transfers in ===
Transfer window	Pos.	No.	Player	From	Ref
Summer	DF	3	(Hungary) Balázs Gallé	Újpest	
Summer	N/A	5	(Hungary) László Csorba	Bánk	
Summer	FW	9	(Hungary) Tamás Nagy	(Faroe Islands) B36 Tórshavn	
Summer	N/A	11	(Hungary) Marcell Odor	Rákosmente	
Summer	GK	16	(Hungary) Péter Tóth	Veresegyház	
Summer	MF	18	(Hungary) Iván Balaskó	Paks	
Summer	DF	19	(Hungary) Ádám Horváth	Barcs	
Summer	MF	21	(Hungary) Krisztián Lisztes	Ferencváros	
Summer	MF	22	(Hungary) Gergő Jeremiás	Bőcs	
Summer	MF	23	(Hungary) Gergő Rása	Újpest	
Summer	DF	25	(Hungary) Tibor Pomper	Honvéd	
Summer	FW	25	(Hungary) Márton Göntér	Haladás VSE	
Summer	N/A	26	(Hungary) Roland Szűcs	Bánk	
Summer	FW	27	(Hungary) Károly Nagy	MTK	
Summer	N/A	27	(Hungary) Gergely Bakos	Rákosmente	
Summer	FW	28	(Hungary) Róbert Hajnal	Vasas	
Summer	MF	29	(Hungary) Balázs Oláh	Újpest	
Summer	N/A	29	(Hungary) Gergely Sebestyén	Vasas	
Spring	19	MF	(Hungary) György Rézmányi	(Norway) Steinkjer	
Winter	DF	17	(Hungary) Gábor Horváth III	Honvéd	
Winter	MF	18	(Hungary) Zoltán Pintér	Diósgyőr	
Winter	MF	28	(Hungary) Dávid Kósa	Jászapáti	

=== Transfers out ===
Transfer window	Pos.	No.	Player	To	Ref
Summer	GK	1	(Hungary) Dániel Botlik	Honvéd	
Summer	MF	9	(Hungary) Zoltán Varga	Debrecen	
Summer	N/A	15	(Hungary) Kristóf Schlafer	Vasas	
Summer	FW	18	(Hungary) Gergely Délczeg	Zalaegerszeg	
Summer	MF	24	(Hungary) Norbert Zana	Szolnok	
Summer	MF	27	(Hungary) Dániel Nagy	ESMTK	
Summer	N/A	28	(Hungary) Ferenc Baghy	ESMTK	
Summer	DF	30	(Hungary) Olivér Pusztai	Austria Kärnten	
Autumn	DF	17	(Hungary) Gábor Horváth I	Siófok	
Winter	FW	9	(Hungary) Tamás Nagy	(Austria) Zöbern	
Winter	GK	16	(Hungary) Tamás Floszmann	Százhalombatta	
Winter	MF	18	(Hungary) Iván Balaskó	(Romania) Liberty Oradea	
Winter	DF	19	(Hungary) Ádám Horváth	Soroksár	
Winter	MF	21	(Hungary) Krisztián Lisztes	(Germany) Hansa Rostock	
Winter	FW	28	(Hungary) Róbert Hajnal	(Austria) Union Gschwandt	

=== Loans in ===
Transfer window	Pos.	No.	Player	From	End date	Ref
Summer	FW	4	(Hungary) Tamás Tandari	Vasas	December 2008	
Winter	MF	4	(Hungary) Ádám Csobánki	Fehérvár	End of season	
Winter	MF	9	(Hungary) Zoltán Varga	Debrecen	End of season	
Winter	DF	21	(Hungary) Árpád Ambrusz	Nyíregyháza	End of season	
Winter	DF	33	(Hungary) Zoltán Kovács	Győr	End of season	

=== Loans out ===
Transfer window	Pos.	No.	Player	To	End date	Ref

== Pre-season and friendlies ==
13 July 2008 Friendly	Vác	1–2	Rákospalota	Vác
	Margitics	Report	Nyerges; Hajnal	Stadium: Ligeti Stadion; Attendance: 100; Referee: Dávid

== Competitions ==
=== Overview ===
Competition	First match	Last match	Starting round	Final position	Record							
Competition	First match	Last match	Starting round	Final position	Pld	W	D	L	GF	GA	GD	Win %
Nemzeti Bajnokság I	26 July 2008	30 May 2009	Matchday 1	16th	30	3	6	21	33	73	−40	10.00
Magyar Kupa	3 September 2008	22 October 2008	Third round	Round of 16	4	2	2	0	12	3	+9	50.00
Ligakupa	1 October 2008	15 February 2009	Group stage	Group stage	10	3	1	6	14	28	−14	30.00
Total					44	8	9	27	59	104	−45	18.18

Source: Competitions

=== Nemzeti Bajnokság I ===
==== League table ====
Pos	Team	Pld	W	D	L	GF	GA	GD	Pts	Qualification or relegation
12	Diósgyőr	30	9	6	15	29	45	−16	33	
13	Budapest Honvéd	30	8	8	14	31	46	−15	32	Qualification for Europa League third qualifying round (Note: Budapest Honvéd won the 2008–09 Hungarian Cup and thereby qualified for the third qualifying round of the UEFA Europa League.)
14	Nyíregyháza	30	7	11	12	32	41	−9	32	
15	Siófok (R)	30	8	2	20	30	56	−26	26	Relegation to Nemzeti Bajnokság II
16	Rákospalota (R)	30	3	6	21	33	73	−40	15	Relegation to Nemzeti Bajnokság II

Source: soccerway.com
Rules for classification: 1st points; 2nd overall wins; 3rd goal difference; 4th goals scored
(R) Relegated

==== Results summary ====
Overall								Home						Away					
Pld	W	D	L	GF	GA	GD	Pts	W	D	L	GF	GA	GD	W	D	L	GF	GA	GD
30	3	6	21	33	73	−40	15	1	4	10	16	34	−18	2	2	11	17	39	−22

Source: Hungarian Football Federation

==== Results by round ====
Round	1	2	3	4	5	6	7	8	9	10	11	12	13	14	15	16	17	18	19	20	21	22	23	24	25	26	27	28	29	30
Ground	H	A	H	A	H	A	H	A	H	A	H	H	A	H	A	A	H	A	H	A	H	A	H	A	H	A	A	H	A	H
Result	D	W	L	L	L	L	L	D	L	L	L	L	L	L	W	L	L	L	D	L	D	L	W	L	L	L	D	D	L	L
Position	9	3	8	10	13	15	15	15	15	15	15	16	16	16	16	16	16	16	16	16	16	16	16	16	16	16	16	16	16	16

Source: Matches
A = Away; H = Home; W = Win; D = Draw; L = Loss

==== Matches ====
26 July 2008 1	Rákospalota	1–1	Diósgyőr	Budapest
20:00 CEST (UTC+2)	Cseri 27'; Kapcsos (yellow card) 45'	Report	Mi. Tóth 29'; Tchana (yellow card) 90'	Stadium: Budai II. László Stadion; Attendance: 1,000; Referee: Szabolcs Szilasi

2 August 2008 2	Paks	1–3	Rákospalota	Paks
20:00 CEST (UTC+2)	S. Horváth (yellow card) 72'; Tököli 78'	Report	Lisztes 5', (yellow card) 49'; Nyerges 17', 81'; Erős (yellow card) 88'; Rása (yellow card) 90'	Stadium: Fehérvári úti Stadion; Attendance: 3,500; Referee: Roland Veizer

9 August 2008 3	Rákospalota	2–3	Zalaegerszeg	Budapest
20:00 CEST (UTC+2)	Nyerges 17' (pen.); Dancs 51'; Erős (yellow card) 60'; Dinka (yellow card) 62'; T. Nagy (yellow card) 66'	Report	Waltner 5' (pen.); Zsömlye (yellow card) 16'; Méyé (yellow card) 21', (goal) 81'; Petneházi (yellow card) 47'; Máté 87'	Stadium: Budai II. László Stadion; Attendance: 700; Referee: Ferenc Bede

17 August 2008 4	Győr	4–2	Rákospalota	Győr
20:00 CEST (UTC+2)	Jäkl (yellow card) 25'; Šupić (yellow card) 46'; Bajzát (yellow card) 58', (goal) 62', 89', 90+3'; Zo. Kovács I 71'; A. Pintér (yellow card) 81'	Report	Dancs 44', (yellow card) 65'; Erős (yellow card) 58'; Nyerges (yellow card) 66'; Lisztes 76'; G. Horváth I (yellow card) 82'; Szántai (yellow card) 88'	Stadium: ETO Park; Attendance: 2,000; Referee: István Vad

23 August 2008 5	Rákospalota	1–2	Fehérvár	Budapest
20:00 CEST (UTC+2)	Lisztes 31'; Kapcsos (red card) 40'; T. Nagy (yellow card) 70'; T. Kiss II (yellow card) 82'	Report	G. Horváth II (yellow card) 22'; B. Farkas (yellow card) 48'; Pavličić 51', (yellow card) 79'; Sitku 70'; Romero (yellow card) 70'; Simek (yellow card) 78'; Koller (red card) 90'	Stadium: Budai II. László Stadion; Attendance: 800; Referee: József Berger

30 August 2008 6	Nyíregyháza	4–0	Rákospalota	Nyíregyháza
20:00 CEST (UTC+2)	Ramos (yellow card) 18'; Apostu 20', 42', 68'; Miskolczi (yellow card) 22'; Shevel 78'; Bárányos (yellow card) 90+2'	Report	Erős (red card) 22'; Balaskó (yellow card) 34'; Rása (yellow card) 79'; Cseri (yellow card) 90+1'	Stadium: Városi Stadion; Attendance: 4,000; Referee: Ferenc Bede

14 September 2008 7	Rákospalota	1–3	Újpest	Budapest
17:30 CEST (UTC+2)	Nyerges 3'; B. Kovács (yellow card) 72'; G. Horváth I (red card) 77'; Balaskó (yellow card) 90+2'	Report	Ćutuk 5'; Mijadinoski 18'; Kabát 44'; Remili (yellow card) 81'	Stadium: Budai II. László Stadion; Attendance: 1,000; Referee: Péter Solymosi

20 September 2008 8	Siófok	1–1	Rákospalota	Siófok
19:00 CEST (UTC+2)	G. Hegedűs (yellow card) 8'; M. Takács 35'; Mogyorósi (yellow card) 53'; Ndjodo (red card) 64'	Report	T. Kiss II (yellow card) 78'; Nyerges 88'	Stadium: Révész Géza utcai Stadion; Attendance: 300; Referee: Roland Veizer

28 September 2008 9	Rákospalota	1–2	Haladás	Budapest
19:00 CEST (UTC+2)	Szántai (yellow card) 27'; Rása (yellow card) 29'; Torma 62'	Report	Kenesei 28' (pen.); Vörös 54'	Stadium: Budai II. László Stadion; Attendance: 600; Referee: Szabolcs Szilasi

4 October 2008 10	Debrecen	6–2	Rákospalota	Debrecen
18:00 CEST (UTC+2)	Szakály 7'; Z. Takács (yellow card) 20'; L. Oláh 36'; Rudolf 44' (pen.); Pomper 56' (o.g.); Z. Kiss 62'; Komlósi (yellow card) 81'; Kerekes 90+2'	Report	Jeremiás 18', 64'; Erős (yellow card) 29'; Cseri (yellow card) 43'	Stadium: Oláh Gábor utcai Stadion; Attendance: 3,000; Referee: János Takács

18 October 2008 11	Rákospalota	0–1	Kecskemét	Budapest
18:00 CEST (UTC+2)	Kapcsos (yellow card) 21'; Lisztes (yellow card) 79'	Report	I. Farkas (yellow card) 11'; Alempijević (yellow card) 30'; Á. Hegedűs 64'	Stadium: Budai II. László Stadion; Attendance: 1,500; Referee: Tamás Bognár

25 October 2008 12	Rákospalota	0–2	Vasas	Budapest
18:00 CEST (UTC+2)	Kapcsos (yellow card) 3'; Sallai (yellow card) 23'; Cseri (yellow card) 78'	Report	Paripović (yellow card) 28'; Divić 52'; Németh 88'	Stadium: Budai II. László Stadion; Attendance: 1,000; Referee: Ferenc Bede

1 November 2008 13	Kaposvár	4–1	Rákospalota	Kaposvár
18:00 CET (UTC+1)	Božović 15'; Zahorecz 43'; Nikolić 46'; Gujić (yellow card) 75'; Bogdán 88'	Report	Torma 62'; Rása (yellow card) 73'; Dancs (yellow card) 78'; Lisztes (yellow card) 78'	Stadium: Rákóczi Stadion; Attendance: 2,000; Referee: Tamás Arany

8 November 2008 14	Rákospalota	2–5	Honvéd	Budapest
18:00 CET (UTC+1)	Kőhalmi (yellow card) 22'; Dancs 28'; Lisztes 77'	Report	Hercegfalvi 15' (pen.), 75'; Rigonato 41'; Genito 57'; Stojaković 82'	Stadium: Budai II. László Stadion; Attendance: 800; Referee: Péter Solymosi

15 November 2008 15	MTK	0–2	Rákospalota	Budapest
15:00 CET (UTC+1)	Rodenbücher (yellow card) 18'; Bajúsz (yellow card) 42'; Kecskés (yellow card) 63'	Report	Cseri (yellow card) 19'; B. Kovács (yellow card) 33'; Nyerges 47'; Pomper (yellow card) 65'; T. Kiss II 76'; Esterházy (yellow card) 86'	Stadium: Hidegkuti Nándor Stadion; Attendance: 1,200; Referee: István Vad

21 February 2009 16	Diósgyőr	2–1	Rákospalota	Miskolc
17:00 CET (UTC+1)	Mi. Tóth (yellow card) 21'; Honma 32'; Miličić (yellow card) 53'; P. Takács 65' (pen.), (yellow card) 73'; Bokros (yellow card) 81'	Report	Pomper (yellow card) 10'; Nyerges 35' (pen.); Erős (yellow card) 77'	Stadium: Diósgyőri Stadion; Attendance: 3,000; Referee: Ádám Németh

7 March 2009 18	Zalaegerszeg	2–1	Rákospalota	Zalaegerszeg
18:00 CET (UTC+1)	A. Horváth (yellow card) 34'; G. Illés 46'; Waltner 60'	Report	Zo. Kovács II (yellow card) 60'; Dancs 73'; Z. Pintér (yellow card) 90'	Stadium: ZTE Arena; Attendance: 2,500; Referee: Péter Solymosi

14 March 2009 19	Rákospalota	0–0	Győr	Budapest
18:00 CET (UTC+1)	Ambrusz (yellow card) 42'; Zo. Kovács II (red card) 89'; B. Kovács (yellow card) 90'	Report	Bajzát (yellow card) 14'; Stark (yellow card) 61'	Stadium: Budai II. László Stadion; Attendance: 800; Referee: Roland Veizer

21 March 2009 20	Fehérvár	4–0	Rákospalota	Székesfehérvár
18:00 CET (UTC+1)	Radović 10'; D. Nagy 45'; B. Farkas 57'; Vujović (yellow card) 67'; Kulcsár 90+2'	Report	Kőhalmi (yellow card) 26'; Ambrusz (yellow card) 49'; Erős (yellow card) 63'	Stadium: Sóstói Stadion; Attendance: 700; Referee: Ádám Farkas

4 April 2009 21	Rákospalota	1–1	Nyíregyháza	Budapest
19:00 CEST (UTC+2)	B. Kovács (yellow card) 19'; Pomper 26'; Szántai (yellow card) 29'; Kőhalmi (yellow card) 57'; Dancs (yellow card) 81'; Z. Pintér (yellow card) 88'	Report	Perenyi (yellow card) 38'; Goia (yellow card) 52'; T. Hegedűs 73', (yellow card) 83'	Stadium: Budai II. László Stadion; Attendance: 500; Referee: Tamás Bognár

11 April 2009 22	Újpest	3–0	Rákospalota	Budapest
19:00 CEST (UTC+2)	Kabát 19', (yellow card) 34'; Božić 74'; A. Simon 87'	Report	Z. Varga (yellow card) 15'; Ambrusz (yellow card) 36'	Stadium: Szusza Ferenc Stadion; Attendance: 5,027; Referee: Ádám Németh

18 April 2009 23	Rákospalota	3–1	Siófok	Budapest
19:00 CEST (UTC+2)	Tusori 25' (o.g.); Z. Pintér (yellow card) 44'; Szántai (yellow card) 60'; Torma 63'; Nyerges 67' (pen.)	Report	Kogler (yellow card) 47'; G. Hegedűs (yellow card) 67'; Magasföldi 87'	Stadium: Budai II. László Stadion; Attendance: 500; Referee: Péter Solymosi

25 April 2009 24	Haladás	1–0	Rákospalota	Szombathely
19:00 CEST (UTC+2)	Rajos 21'; Kuttor (yellow card) 30'	Report	Ambrusz (yellow card) 21'; Sallai (yellow card) 25'; Zo. Kovács II (yellow card) 30'; Pomper (yellow card) 77'; Z. Pintér (yellow card) 79'	Stadium: Rohonci út Attendance: 3,000; Referee: Sándor Andó-Szabó

28 April 2009 25	Rákospalota	0–4	Debrecen	Budapest
19:00 CEST (UTC+2)	Erős (yellow card) 58'	Report	Czvitkovics 4'; Rudolf 19'; Szilágyi 55'; Leandro 59'; Rezes (yellow card) 65'	Stadium: Budai II. László Stadion; Attendance: 300; Referee: Ádám Farkas

1 May 2009 26	Kecskemét	5–3	Rákospalota	Kecskemét
19:00 CEST (UTC+2)	Mbengono 12'; Csordás 36'; Litsingi 50'; Montvai 57', 84'; Koncz (yellow card) 62'	Report	Z. Varga 14', (red card) 69'; Torma 30', 40'; B. Kovács (yellow card) 35'; Jeremiás (yellow card) 56'; Kapcsos (red card) 75'; Sallai (yellow card) 80'	Stadium: Széktói Stadion; Attendance: 2,000; Referee: János Takács

6 May 2009 17	Rákospalota	1–2	Paks	Budapest
19:00 CEST (UTC+2)	Nyerges 24'; Pomper (yellow card) 61'	Report	T. Kiss I 6'; A. Pintér (yellow card) 22'; J. Szabó 40'; Böde (yellow card) 87'	Stadium: Budai II. László Stadion; Attendance: 500; Referee: Roland Veizer
Note: The matches of the 17th round were postponed due to HFF decision.

9 May 2009 27	Vasas	1–1	Rákospalota	Budapest
19:00 CEST (UTC+2)	Sowunmi 33'; Vukelja (yellow card) 71'; Tóth B. (yellow card) 83'	Report	Sallai (yellow card) 23'; Ambrusz (yellow card) 35'; Dancs (yellow card) 62'; Pomper (red card) 84'; Z. Varga 90+2'	Stadium: Stadion Rudolf Illovszky; Attendance: 1,500; Referee: Ádám Farkas

16 May 2009 28	Rákospalota	3–3	Kaposvár	Budapest
19:00 CEST (UTC+2)	Torma 29'; Zo. Kovács II (yellow card) 32'; Dancs 60', (yellow card) 66'; Kapcsos 63'	Report	Nikolić 14', (yellow card) 66'; Zsolnai 20'; Petrók 57'; Grúz (yellow card) 64'	Stadium: Budai II. László Stadion; Attendance: 800; Referee: Viktor Kassai

23 May 2009 29	Honvéd	1–0	Rákospalota	Budapest
19:00 CEST (UTC+2)	Hercegfalvi 21'; Debreceni (yellow card) 74'; Dobos (yellow card) 90+1'	Report	Sallai (yellow card) 30'; Z. Pintér (yellow card) 39'; Z. Varga (yellow card) 59'	Stadium: Bozsik Stadion; Attendance: 1,000; Referee: Szabolcs Szilasi

30 May 2009 30	Rákospalota	0–4	MTK	Budapest
19:00 CEST (UTC+2)	Jeremiás (yellow card) 5'; Cseri (yellow card) 29'	Report	Könyves (yellow card) 22'; Hidvégi 35'; Urbán 37', (yellow card) 44'; Pátkai 69'; Tischler 86'	Stadium: Budai II. László Stadion; Attendance: 500; Referee: Zoltán Iványi

=== Magyar Kupa ===
3 September 2008 Third round	Dabas	0–6	Rákospalota	Dabas
15:30 CEST (UTC+2)	Balázs (yellow card) 25'; Buczkó (yellow card) 48'; Volenszki (yellow card) 69'	Report	Torma 13', 45'; Nyerges 20'; Balaskó 27'; Kőhalmi 65'; Hajnal 75'	Stadium: Dabasi Sporttelep; Attendance: 100; Referee: Gábor Fajkusz

24 September 2008 Round of 32	Újszász	0–3	Rákospalota	Újszász
15:30 CEST (UTC+2)	Boros (yellow card) 80'	Report	Jeremiás 11'; Dancs 29'; Tandari 60'; Gasparik (yellow card) 86'	Stadium: Újszászi Sportpálya; Attendance: 300; Referee: József Erdős

Round of 16

8 October 2008 First leg	Kecskemét	1–1	Rákospalota	Kecskemét
17:00 CEST (UTC+2)	Csordás 28'; Čukić (yellow card) 83'	Report	B. Kovács (yellow card) 36'; Erős (yellow card) 56'; Jeremiás (yellow card) 66'; Kapcsos 83'	Stadium: Széktói Stadion; Referee: István Vad

22 October 2008 Second leg	Rákospalota	2–2 (a.e.t.) (3–3 (a) agg.)	Kecskemét	Budapest
14:00 CEST (UTC+2)	Erős (yellow card) 26'; Pomper (yellow card) 39'; Torma 74'; Kapcsos (yellow card) 75'; Nyerges 115'	Report	Čukić (yellow card) 11'; Csordás 43'; Litsingi (yellow card) 68', (goal) 103'	Stadium: Budai II. László Stadion; Referee: Szabolcs Szilasi
Note: 3–3 on aggregate. Kecskemét won on away goals.

=== Ligakupa ===
==== Group stage ====
Pos	Team	Pld	W	D	L	GF	GA	GD	Pts	Qualification	FEH	HON	FER	KEC	RAK	BAK
1	Fehérvár	10	7	3	0	29	9	+20	24	Advance to knockout phase	—	2–2	0–0	2–0	4–0	8–0
2	Honvéd	10	5	4	1	33	16	+17	19	Advance to knockout phase	1–1	—	2–2	5–3	8–1	5–1
3	Ferencváros	10	5	4	1	20	10	+10	19		2–3	2–2	—	2–1	3–0	3–0
4	Kecskemét	10	3	2	5	22	17	+5	11		2–3	2–3	0–0	—	2–2	4–0
5	Rákospalota	10	3	1	6	14	28	−14	10		2–4	1–0	2–3	0–3	—	4–1
6	Baktalórántháza	10	0	0	10	3	41	−38	0		0–2	1–5	0–3	0–5	0–2	—

Source: HFF

1 October 2008 1	Fehérvár	4–0	Rákospalota	Székesfehérvár
17:00 CEST (UTC+2)	Kulcsár 15', 19'; Disztl 21'; D. Nagy 67'	Report	Dancs (yellow card) 21'; Hajdú (yellow card) 78'	Stadium: Sóstói Stadion; Attendance: 300; Referee: Gábor Oláh

15 October 2008 2	Rákospalota	0–3	Kecskemét	Budapest
16:00 CEST (UTC+2)		Report	Koszó (yellow card) 16'; Alempijević 58'; Disney 60'; S. Nagy 69'	Stadium: Budai II. László Stadion; Attendance: 100; Referee: Ádám Farkas

29 October 2008 3	Honvéd	8–1	Rákospalota	Budapest
18:00 CET (UTC+1)	Kocsis 4', 45'; Gebro 25'; Simić 30'; Arsenijević 56', 86'; Rigonato 63', 90'	Report	Lisztes 3'; B. Kovács (yellow card) 57'	Stadium: Bozsik Stadion; Attendance: 200; Referee: László Varga

5 November 2008 4	Baktalórántháza	0–2	Rákospalota	Baktalórántháza
13:30 CET (UTC+1)	L. Illés (yellow card) 68'	Report	Dancs 62', 83'; Kőhalmi (yellow card) 68'	Stadium: Városi Stadion; Attendance: 100; Referee: Róbert Nagy

12 November 2008 5	Rákospalota	2–3	Ferencváros	Budapest
18:00 CET (UTC+1)	Sallai 28'; Kapcsos 81'	Report	Kamaté 16'; Pisanjuk 42'; Brettschneider 49'	Stadium: Budai II. László Stadion; Attendance: 500; Referee: István Mészáros

29 November 2008 7	Kecskemét	2–2	Rákospalota	Kecskemét
13:00 CET (UTC+1)	Montvai 28'; Vlahovic (yellow card) 58'; Kormos (yellow card) 79'; Menyhárt 84'	Report	Dancs 31', 58'; Pomper (yellow card) 60'; Kapcsos (yellow card) 68'; Sallai (red card) 77'	Stadium: Széktói Stadion; Attendance: 200; Referee: Zoltán Iványi

3 December 2008 6	Rákospalota	2–4	Fehérvár	Budapest
13:00 CET (UTC+1)	Dancs (yellow card) 31'; Torma 54', 60'; Gasparik (yellow card) 56'; Erős (yellow card) 58'	Report	Sitku 7', 83' (pen.); Kulcsár 44'; B. Farkas 59'	Stadium: Budai II. László Stadion; Attendance: 50; Referee: János Takács

6 December 2008 8	Rákospalota	1–0	Honvéd	Budapest
13:00 CET (UTC+1)	B. Kovács (yellow card) 48'; Erős (yellow card) 58'; Kapcsos 65'	Report	Z. Tóth (yellow card) 15'; Debreceni (yellow card) 45'; Hercegfalvi (red card) 78'	Stadium: Budai II. László Stadion; Referee: Ádám Németh

7 February 2009 9	Rákospalota	4–1	Baktalórántháza	Budapest
14:00 CET (UTC+1)	Torma 37', 67'; Kapcsos 39'; Erős (yellow card) 45'; Z. Varga 52'; Z. Pintér (yellow card) 88'	Report	Marics 25'; Tolnai (yellow card) 36'; Koskovits (red card) 49'; Deák (yellow card) 71'	Stadium: Budai II. László Stadion; Attendance: 150; Referee: Mihály Fábián

15 February 2009 10	Ferencváros	3–0	Rákospalota	Budapest
17:30 CET (UTC+1)	Dragóner 18'; Wolfe (yellow card) 26'; Lowton (yellow card) 38'; Kamaté 60'; Be. Tóth 89'	Report	Kapcsos (yellow card) 4'; B. Kovács (yellow card) 17'; Z. Varga (yellow card) 29'	Stadium: Üllői úti stadion Attendance: 600; Referee: Roland Veizer

== Statistics ==
=== Overall ===
Appearances (Apps) numbers are for appearances in competitive games only, including sub appearances.
Source: Competitions

No.	Player	Pos.	Nemzeti Bajnokság I				Magyar Kupa				Ligakupa				Total			
No.	Player	Pos.	Apps	Goal	Yellow card	Red card	Apps	Goal	Yellow card	Red card	Apps	Goal	Yellow card	Red card	Apps	Goal	Yellow card	Red card
1	(Hungary) Mátyás Esterházy	GK	9		1		4				2				15		1	
1	(Hungary) Gergely Szalay	GK																
2	(Hungary) Balázs Dinka	DF	12		1		2				3				17		1	
3	(Hungary) Balázs Gallé	DF																
4	(Hungary) Tamás Tandari	FW					1	1			2				3	1		
4	(Hungary) Ádám Csobánki	MF	2												2			
5	(Hungary) Balázs Sallai	DF	28		5		3				6	1		1	37	1	5	1
5	(Hungary) László Csorba										1				1			
6	(Hungary) András Kőhalmi	MF	22		3		4	1			7		1		33	1	4	
7	(Hungary) Gergő Cseri	MF	23	1	5		3				7				33	1	5	
7	(Hungary) Bálint Benke	MF									1				1			
8	(Hungary) Vince Kapcsos	DF	23	1	3	2	4	1	1		7	3	2		34	5	6	2
9	(Hungary) Tamás Nagy	FW	5		2										5		2	
9	(Hungary) Zoltán Varga	MF	12	2	2	1					2	1	1		14	3	3	1
10	(Hungary) Gábor Torma	FW	20	6			3	3			6	4			29	13		
11	(Hungary) Krisztián Nyerges	FW	29	9	1		4	2			6				39	11	1	
11	(Hungary) Marcell Odor										1				1			
12	(Hungary) Levente Szántai	GK	21		4						9				30		4	
13	(Hungary) Tamás Kiss	MF	10	1	2						9				19	1	2	
13	(Hungary) Ádám Szoboszlai										1				1			
14	(Hungary) Balázs Kovács	MF	16		5		3		1		6		3		25		9	
15	(Hungary) Roland Dancs	MF	28	5	5		4	1			8	4	2		40	10	7	
16	(Hungary) Dániel Schön	GK																
16	(Hungary) Péter Tóth	GK									1				1			
17	(Hungary) Gábor Horváth I	DF	7		1	1									7		1	1
17	(Hungary) Gábor Horváth II	DF																
17	(Hungary) Ármin Tihanyi	MF	2								2				4			
17	(Hungary) Sándor Imre										2				2			
17	(Hungary) Ádám Kramlik										1				1			
18	(Hungary) Iván Balaskó	MF	9		2		4	1			2				15	1	2	
18	(Hungary) Zoltán Pintér	MF	12		5						2		1		14		6	
19	(Hungary) György Rézmányi	MF	6												6			
19	(Hungary) Ádám Horváth	DF									1				1			
20	(Hungary) Károly Erős	MF	18		7	1	3		2		6		3		27		12	1
21	(Hungary) Krisztián Lisztes	MF	14	4	3		2				3	1			19	5	3	
21	(Hungary) Árpád Ambrusz	DF	9		5										9		5	
22	(Hungary) Gergő Jeremiás	MF	27	2	2		3	1	1		7				37	3	3	
23	(Hungary) Gergő Rása	MF	13		4		3				3				19		4	
23	(Hungary) Lóránd Csorja										1				1			
24	(Hungary) Tamás Hajdú	MF	1								3		1		4		1	
25	(Hungary) Tibor Pomper	DF	16	1	4	1	3		1		7		1		26	1	6	1
25	(Hungary) Márton Göntér	FW									1				1			
26	(Hungary) Tamás Gasparik	DF	3				1		1		7		1		11		2	
26	(Hungary) Roland Szűcs										1				1			
27	(Hungary) Károly Nagy	FW	4								6				10			
27	(Hungary) Gergely Bakos										2				2			
28	(Hungary) Dávid Kósa	MF	1												1			
28	(Hungary) Róbert Hajnal	FW					1	1							1	1		
29	(Hungary) Attila Héger	MF	1				1				5				7			
29	(Hungary) Balázs Oláh	MF									3				3			
29	(Hungary) Gergely Sebestyén										1				1			
30	(Hungary) Károly Illés	MF									4				4			
33	(Hungary) Zoltán Kovács	DF	11		3	1									11		3	1
Own goals				1												1		
Totals				33	75	7		12	7			14	16	1		59	98	8

=== Clean sheets ===
			Clean sheets			
No.	Player	Games Played	Nemzeti Bajnokság I	Magyar Kupa	Ligakupa	Total
12	(Hungary) Levente Szántai	30	1		2	3
1	(Hungary) Mátyás Esterházy	15	1	2	0	3
16	(Hungary) Péter Tóth	1			1	1
1	(Hungary) Gergely Szalay	0				0
16	(Hungary) Dániel Schön	0				0
Totals			2	2	3	7
