= 2009–10 Rákospalotai EAC season =

Rákospalota
2009–10 season
- Owner: József Forgács
- Manager: Sándor Nagy (until 22 April); János Mátyus (from 23 April)
- Stadium: Stadion Budai II. Laszló
- Nemzeti Bajnokság II: 4th
- Magyar Kupa: Round of 32
- Top goalscorer: League: Krisztián Nyerges (22); All: Krisztián Nyerges (23)
- Highest home attendance: 500 (vs Makó, 23 August 2009)
- Lowest home attendance: 100 (vs Szolnok, 30 September 2009)

The 2009–10 season was Rákospalotai Egyetértés Atlétikai Club's or shortly REAC's 63rd competitive season, 1st consecutive season in the Nemzeti Bajnokság II and 97th year in existence as a football club. In addition to the domestic league, Rákospalota participated in this season's editions of the Magyar Kupa.

The newly relegated side were aiming for promotion, however they have failed to produce a standout performance this season. After the loss against Vác on 21 April, Sándor Nagy got sacked, who worked at the club for 2 1/2 years. He was replaced by the former Hungarian national footballer János Mátyus.

== First team squad ==
The players listed had league appearances and stayed until the end of the season.

Note: Flags indicate national team as defined under FIFA eligibility rules; some limited exceptions apply. Players may hold more than one non-FIFA nationality.

No.	Pos.	Nation	Player
1	GK	HUN	Csaba Somogyi
2	DF	HUN	Balázs Dinka
4	DF	HUN	Máté Tóth
5	DF	HUN	Balázs Sallai
7	MF	HUN	Gergő Cseri
8	DF	HUN	Vince Kapcsos
9	FW	HUN	Péter Pölöskei (loaned from Ferencváros)
10	FW	HUN	Gábor Torma
11	FW	HUN	Krisztián Nyerges
12	GK	HUN	Csaba Borszéki
13	MF	HUN	Tamás Kiss
14	MF	HUN	Balázs Kovács
15	MF	HUN	Roland Dancs

No.	Pos.	Nation	Player
18	MF	HUN	Balázs Gáspár
19	MF	HUN	Zoltán Gáspár
20	FW	HUN	Botond Birtalan
21	MF	HUN	Roland Lipcsei
22	MF	HUN	Gergő Jeremiás
25	MF	HUN	Attila Szili
26	DF	HUN	Tamás Gasparik
27	FW	HUN	Károly Nagy
28	MF	HUN	Richárd Gamal
29	DF	HUN	Zsolt Merczel
30	MF	HUN	Károly Illés
33	DF	HUN	Zoltán Kovács (loaned from Győr)

== Transfers ==
=== Transfers in ===
Transfer window	Pos.	No.	Player	From	Ref
Summer	DF	–	(Hungary) Martin Tímár	Szolnoki Spartacus	
Summer	DF	4	(Hungary) Máté Tóth	Győr	
Summer	MF	9	(Hungary) Zoltán Varga	Debrecen	
Summer	GK	12	(Hungary) Csaba Borszéki	Vasas	
Summer	GK	16	(Hungary) Dániel Illyés	Nyíregyháza	
Summer	MF	18	(Hungary) Attila Dobos	Budapest Honvéd	
Summer	FW	19	(Hungary) Gábor Koós	Budapest Honvéd	
Summer	MF	21	(Hungary) Roland Lipcsei	Jászberény	
Summer	MF	28	(Hungary) Richárd Gamal	Csillaghegy	
Summer	DF	29	(Hungary) Zsolt Merczel	Vasas	
Winter	MF	–	(Hungary) Sándor Maczó	Láng SK	
Winter	GK	1	(Hungary) Csaba Somogyi	Hévíz	
Winter	GK	12	(Hungary) Péter Tóth	Rákosmente	
Winter	MF	18	(Hungary) Balázs Gáspár	Vasas	
Winter	MF	19	(Hungary) Zoltán Gáspár	Vasas	
Winter	FW	20	(Hungary) Botond Birtalan	Kecskemét	
Winter	MF	25	(Hungary) Attila Szili	(Cyprus) Atromitos Yeroskipou	

=== Transfers out ===
Transfer window	Pos.	No.	Player	To	Ref
Summer	DF	3	(Hungary) Balázs Gallé	Vasas	
Summer	MF	6	(Hungary) András Kőhalmi	Released	
Summer	N/A	11	(Hungary) Marcell Odor	Rákosmente	
Summer	GK	12	(Hungary) Levente Szántai	MTK Budapest	
Summer	N/A	13	(Hungary) Ádám Szoboszlai	Magyar AC	
Summer	DF	15	(Hungary) Tibor Virágh	Budakalász	
Summer	GK	16	(Hungary) Péter Tóth	Rákosmente	
Summer	GK	16	(Hungary) Dániel Schön	Rákosszentmihály	
Summer	N/A	17	(Hungary) Ádám Kramlik	Hernád	
Summer	DF	17	(Hungary) Gábor Horváth	Ferencváros	
Summer	MF	18	(Hungary) Zoltán Pintér	Szigetszentmiklós	
Summer	19	MF	(Hungary) György Rézmányi	(Norway) Steinkjer	
Summer	MF	20	(Hungary) Károly Erős	Monor	
Summer	MF	23	(Hungary) Gergő Rása	Videoton	
Summer	N/A	23	(Hungary) Lóránd Csorja	Novaj	
Summer	N/A	27	(Hungary) Gergely Bakos	Rákosmente	
Summer	MF	29	(Hungary) Attila Héger	(Austria) USC Piesendorf	
Summer	N/A	29	(Hungary) Gergely Sebestyén	Rákosszentmihály	
Winter	GK	1	(Hungary) Mátyás Esterházy	Újpest II	
Winter	MF	9	(Hungary) Zoltán Varga	Pécs	
Winter	GK	16	(Hungary) Dániel Illyés	Eger	
Winter	MF	17	(Hungary) Ármin Tihanyi	Rákosszentmihály	
Winter	MF	18	(Hungary) Attila Dobos	Diósgyőr	
Winter	FW	19	(Hungary) Gábor Koós	Budaörs	
Winter	DF	25	(Hungary) Tibor Pomper	Hévíz	
Winter	N/A	26	(Hungary) Roland Szűcs	Bánk	
Winter	MF	28	(Hungary) Dávid Kósa	(Austria) Ratzersdorf	

=== Loans in ===
Transfer window	Pos.	No.	Player	From	End date	Ref
Summer	GK	16	(Hungary) Gellért Vajda	Pomázi Focisuli SE	December 2009	
Winter	FW	9	(Hungary) Péter Pölöskei	Ferencváros	End of season	
Winter	DF	33	(Hungary) Zoltán Kovács	Győr	End of season	

=== Loans out ===
Transfer window	Pos.	No.	Player	To	End date	Ref
Summer	MF	7	(Hungary) Bálint Benke	Rákosszentmihály	End of season	
Summer	MF	17	(Hungary) Ármin Tihanyi	Rákosszentmihály	31 December 2009	
Summer	N/A	17	(Hungary) Sándor Imre	Dorog	End of season	
Summer	MF	28	(Hungary) Dávid Kósa	Aszód	December 2009	

== Friendlies ==
16 January 2010 Friendly	Újpest	1–1	Rákospalota	Budapest
	Casapulla 60'	Report	Torma 90'	Stadium: Fáy utcai Stadion

26 January 2010 Friendly	MTK Budapest	3–1	Rákospalota	Budapest
	Nikházi x2; Pál	Report

13 February 2010 Friendly	Ferencváros	6–1	Rákospalota	Budapest
	Ferenczi 28', 78', 82'; Elding 31', 76'; Shaw 62'	Report	Pölöskei 27'

19 February 2010 Friendly	Budapest Honvéd	3–1	Rákospalota	Budapest
	Guié; Macko; Z. Nagy II	Report	Pölöskei

== Competitions ==
=== Overview ===
Competition	First match	Last match	Starting round	Final position	Record							
Competition	First match	Last match	Starting round	Final position	Pld	W	D	L	GF	GA	GD	Win %
Nemzeti Bajnokság II	9 August 2009	13 June 2010	Matchday 1	4th	28	15	5	8	76	36	+40	53.57
Magyar Kupa	20 August 2009	30 September 2009	Second round	Round of 32	3	2	0	1	13	5	+8	66.67
Total					31	17	5	9	89	41	+48	54.84

Source: Competitions

=== Nemzeti Bajnokság II ===
==== League table ====
Pos	Team	Pld	W	D	L	GF	GA	GD	Pts
2	Debrecen II	28	17	4	7	53	26	+27	55
3	Vác	28	15	7	6	47	36	+11	52
4	Rákospalota	28	15	5	8	76	36	+40	50
5	Mezőkövesd	28	11	9	8	37	35	+2	42
6	Vecsés	28	11	8	9	45	32	+13	41

Source: soccerway.com
Rules for classification: 1st points; 2nd overall wins; 3rd goal difference; 4th goals scored

==== Results summary ====
Overall								Home						Away					
Pld	W	D	L	GF	GA	GD	Pts	W	D	L	GF	GA	GD	W	D	L	GF	GA	GD
28	15	5	8	76	36	+40	50	7	2	5	35	20	+15	8	3	3	41	16	+25

Source: Hungarian Football Federation

==== Results by round ====
Round	1	2	3	4	5	6	7	8	9	10	11	12	13	14	15	16	17	18	19	20	21	22	23	24	25	26	27	28
Ground	H	A	H	A	H	H	A	H	A	H	H	A	H	A	A	H	A	H	A	A	H	A	H	A	A	H	A	H
Result	W	L	W	W	W	W	L	L	W	W	W	D	D	D	D	L	W	L	W	W	L	W	D	W	L	W	W	L
Position	3	8	3	2	1	1	3	4	3	1	1	1	2	2	2	4	4	4	4	4	4	4	4	4	4	4	3	4

Source: Matches
A = Away; H = Home; W = Win; D = Draw; L = Loss

==== Matches ====
9 August 2009 1	Rákospalota	2–1	MTK Budapest II	Budapest
19:00 CEST (UTC+2)	Dancs (yellow card) 15'; Szurkos 17' (o.g.); Dobos (yellow card) 22'; Esterházy (yellow card) 24'; Pomper (red card) 31'; Nyerges 74' (pen.)	Report	Gál (yellow card) 19', (goal) 24' (pen.); Pál (yellow card) 56'; T. Nagy (yellow card) 70'; Nikházi (yellow card) 88'	Stadium: Stadion Budai II. Laszló; Attendance: 400; Referee: Szabolcs Szilasi

15 August 2009 2	Vác	2–1	Rákospalota	Vác
17:30 CEST (UTC+2)	Langó 14'; C. Hegedűs (yellow card) 27'; Sztankó (yellow card) 28'; P. Kovács 82'	Report	Nyerges 29' (pen.); Cseri (yellow card) 48'	Stadium: Ligeti Stadion; Attendance: 250; Referee: Gábor Péter Kovács

23 August 2009 3	Rákospalota	2–1	Makó	Budapest
19:00 CEST (UTC+2)	Kapcsos 23', (yellow card) 50'; Nyerges 41'	Report	Szamosszegi (yellow card) 21'; Rakonczai (yellow card) 33'; Csák 76'; Czirbus (yellow card) 83'	Stadium: Stadion Budai II. Laszló; Attendance: 500; Referee: Balázs Böcskei

30 August 2009 4	BKV Előre	0–3	Rákospalota	Budapest
17:30 CEST (UTC+2)	Baranya (yellow card) 23'; Halgas (yellow card) 53'; Hartai (yellow card) 89'; Béress (yellow card) 90'	Report	Dancs 10', 76'; Koós 48'; Cseri (yellow card) 53'	Stadium: Sport utcai stadium Attendance: 300; Referee: Roland Veizer

6 September 2009 5	Rákospalota	7–2	Békéscsaba	Budapest
18:00 CEST (UTC+2)	Cseri 9'; Dobos 21'; Dancs 35'; Z. Varga 44'; Kapcsos (yellow card) 54'; Pomper 59'; Torma 65' (pen.), 87' (pen.)	Report	Balázs (yellow card) 37', (goal) 55', 71'; Juhász (yellow card) 65'	Stadium: Stadion Budai II. Laszló; Attendance: 300; Referee: Krisztián Király

20 September 2009 6	Rákospalota	2–0	Mezőkövesd	Budapest
18:00 CEST (UTC+2)	Nyerges 54'; Z. Varga (yellow card) 61'; Jeremiás (yellow card) 86'; Koós 89'	Report	Kaszás (yellow card) 23'; Vitelki (yellow card) 60'	Stadium: Stadion Budai II. Laszló; Attendance: 300; Referee: István Vad

26 September 2009 7	Vecsés	1–0	Rákospalota	Vecsés
16:00 CEST (UTC+2)	Kurucsai (yellow card) 28'; Kiskapusi (yellow card) 39'; Lannert 85'; Á. Horváth (yellow card) 90+2'	Report	Z. Varga (yellow card) 28'; Pomper (yellow card) 42'	Stadium: Stadion Dózsa György út Attendance: 500; Referee: Szabolcs Szilasi

4 October 2009 8	Rákospalota	1–3	Debrecen II	Budapest
18:00 CEST (UTC+2)	Cseri (yellow card) 19'; B. Kovács (yellow card) 56'; Kapcsos 71', (yellow card) 76'	Report	Szűcs 5'; Vinicius 14'; Ludánszki (yellow card) 74'; Rezes 75'; Korhut (yellow card) 82'; Klavács (yellow card) 90+1'	Stadium: Stadion Budai II. Laszló; Attendance: 300; Referee: Zoltán J. Kovács

11 October 2009 9	Cegléd	2–3	Rákospalota	Cegléd
15:00 CEST (UTC+2)	Lendvai (yellow card) 5', (goal) 34', 36'; Fekete (yellow card) 23'; Villányi (red card) 63'; Buzás (yellow card) 68'	Report	Jeremiás 9'; Cseri (yellow card) 30'; Nyerges 46'; Sallai (yellow card) 57'; Dancs 67'; Z. Varga (yellow card) 72'	Stadium: Stadion Malomtó széli Attendance: 500; Referee: Mihály Fábián

18 October 2009 10	Rákospalota	7–2	Baktalórántháza	Budapest
17:00 CEST (UTC+2)	Z. Varga 18'; Kapcsos 40'; Koós 42'; Nyerges 58'; Torma 69', 90+2'; Illyés (yellow card) 77'; Jeremiás 88'	Report	Szenes 4'; Mező (yellow card) 19'; Kozma 31', (yellow card) 68'; R. Szabó (yellow card) 77'; N. Tóth (yellow card) 87'	Stadium: Stadion Budai II. Laszló; Attendance: 200; Referee: Balázs Berke

25 October 2009 11	Rákospalota	3–0	Kazincbarcika	Budapest
17:00 CET (UTC+1)	Nyerges 23', 71'; Torma 85'	Report	Hanász (yellow card) 46'; Urbán-Szabó (yellow card) 47'	Stadium: Stadion Budai II. Laszló; Attendance: 400; Referee: Sándor Andó-Szabó

1 November 2009 12	Bőcs	1–1	Rákospalota	Bőcs
13:30 CET (UTC+1)	Z. Molnár (yellow card) 7'; Stevica 28'; Lipták (yellow card) 77'; Urbin (yellow card) 82'; Vasas (yellow card) 90'	Report	Dancs 8', (yellow card) 44'; Sallai (yellow card) 21'; Z. Varga (yellow card) 45'; Dobos (yellow card) 60'; B. Kovács (yellow card) 88'	Stadium: Szabadság utcai Stadion; Attendance: 250; Referee: József Berger

8 November 2009 13	Rákospalota	0–0	Hajdúböszörmény	Budapest
17:00 CET (UTC+1)	Cseri (yellow card) 60'	Report	Frida (yellow card) 22'; D. Nagy (yellow card) 80'	Stadium: Stadion Budai II. Laszló; Attendance: 200; Referee: Róbert Nagy

14 November 2009 14	Szolnok	3–3	Rákospalota	Szolnok
13:15 CET (UTC+1)	Z. Molnár (yellow card) 17'; G. Hegedűs (yellow card) 29'; Csehi 31'; Antal 36', 78'; Kotula (yellow card) 43'	Report	Nyerges 26' (pen.), 30' (pen.), 49'; Dancs (yellow card) 69'; Kapcsos (yellow card) 73'; Pomper (yellow card) 86'	Stadium: Tiszaligeti Stadion; Attendance: 800; Referee: Roland Veizer

7 March 2010 15	MTK Budapest II	2–2	Rákospalota	Budapest
13:00 CET (UTC+1)	Kákonyi 62', (yellow card) 83'; Gál (yellow card) 86'; Nikházi 90+2'	Report	Cseri 21'; Torma 37'; Pölöskei (yellow card) 57'; Sallai (yellow card) 70'; Dancs (yellow card) 86'	Stadium: Promontor utcai Stadion; Attendance: 100; Referee: Ádám Németh

21 March 2010 17	Makó	1–7	Rákospalota	Makó
15:00 CET (UTC+1)	Podonyi (red card) 29'; Csák 90+1'	Report	Nyerges 21', 68'; Torma 37', 70'; Pölöskei (yellow card) 48', (goal) 49', 65', 80'; Jeremiás (yellow card) 50'	Stadium: Stadium Erdei Ferenc tér Attendance: 500; Referee: Zoltán Iványi

28 March 2010 18	Rákospalota	0–1	BKV Előre	Budapest
15:00 CEST (UTC+2)	B. Kovács (yellow card) 17'; Dancs (yellow card) 60'	Report	Csopaki 5'; Mayer (yellow card) 12'; Csikós (yellow card) 36'; Fazakas (yellow card) 56'	Stadium: Stadion Budai II. Laszló; Attendance: 300; Referee: Zsolt Szabó

3 April 2010 19	Békéscsaba	1–5	Rákospalota	Békéscsaba
16:30 CEST (UTC+2)	Balázs 23'; Máthé (yellow card) 44'; Borbély (yellow card) 63'	Report	Lipcsei 27', 52'; B. Kovács 34'; Nyerges 39', 45' (pen.)	Stadium: Stadion Kórház utcai Attendance: 350; Referee: László Varga

18 April 2010 20	Mezőkövesd	0–3	Rákospalota	Mezőkövesd
17:00 CEST (UTC+2)	Bene (yellow card) 1'; P. Nagy (yellow card) 25'; Sivák (yellow card) 74'; V. Szabó (yellow card) 81'	Report	Birtalan 51'; Jeremiás (yellow card) 56'; Pölöskei 74', (yellow card) 78'; Nyerges 83'	Stadium: Városi Stadion; Attendance: 700; Referee: Zoltán J. Kovács

21 April 2010 16	Rákospalota	1–2	Vác	Budapest
19:00 CEST (UTC+2)	Torma 31'; Lipcsei (yellow card) 51'; Nyerges (yellow card) 72'; B. Kovács (yellow card) 83'	Report	Páles 21'; Ivanovici 49', (yellow card) 50'; Tányéros (yellow card) 80'	Stadium: Stadion Budai II. Laszló; Attendance: 300; Referee: Sándor Andó-Szabó

25 April 2010 21	Rákospalota	0–3	Vecsés	Budapest
15:00 CEST (UTC+2)	Nyerges (yellow card) 31'; Lipcsei (red card) 90+1'	Report	Patkó (yellow card) 20'; Kiskapusi (yellow card) 24'; Máj (yellow card) 30'; Kormos 35'; Lannert 39', (yellow card) 81'; Dosso 73'	Stadium: Stadion Budai II. Laszló; Attendance: 300; Referee: Mihály Fábián

1 May 2010 22	Debrecen II	1–3	Rákospalota	Debrecen
17:30 CEST (UTC+2)	Oláh (yellow card) 34'; Csorba 82'	Report	Kapcsos 35'; Pölöskei 38', 84', (yellow card) 85'; Z. Kovács (yellow card) 38'; B. Kovács (yellow card) 47'; Dancs (yellow card) 68'; Torma (yellow card) 83'	Stadium: Dóczy József utcai Sportpálya; Attendance: 600; Referee: János Takács

9 May 2010 23	Rákospalota	2–2	Cegléd	Budapest
18:00 CEST (UTC+2)	Pölöskei (yellow card) 39', (goal) 90'; Nyerges 57' (pen.)	Report	Selei 48' (pen.); M. Tóth (yellow card) 51'; A. Nagy 72'; Rézsó (yellow card) 88'	Stadium: Stadion Budai II. Laszló; Attendance: 200; Referee: Szabolcs Szilasi

15 May 2010 24	Baktalórántháza	0–6	Rákospalota	Baktalórántháza
17:30 CEST (UTC+2)	Lévai (yellow card) 23'; L. Molnár (yellow card) 61'	Report	Cseri 16'; Nyerges 25', 39'; Jeremiás 53'; Torma 60', 63'	Stadium: Városi Stadion; Attendance: 150; Referee: Szabolcs Fenyvesi

22 May 2010 25	Kazincbarcika	1–0	Rákospalota	Kazincbarcika
18:00 CEST (UTC+2)	Binder 60' (pen.)	Report	Dancs (yellow card) 48'; T. Kiss (yellow card) 89'; Kapcsos (yellow card) 90+1'	Stadium: Pete András Stadion; Attendance: 400; Referee: Viktor Kassai

30 May 2010 26	Rákospalota	6–0	Bőcs	Budapest
18:00 CEST (UTC+2)	Pölöskei 25'; M. Tóth 41'; Jeremiás 71'; Dancs 81'; Birtalan 85', 87'	Report	Bokros (yellow card) 66'	Stadium: Stadion Budai II. Laszló; Attendance: 200; Referee: Zoltán J. Kovács

5 June 2010 27	Hajdúböszörmény	1–4	Rákospalota	Hajdúböszörmény
18:00 CEST (UTC+2)	Bellon (yellow card) 23'; Balás 73'	Report	Jeremiás (yellow card) 24'; Nyerges 34', 51'; Sallai (yellow card) 53'; Birtalan 64'; Torma 78'	Stadium: Városi Stadion; Attendance: 250; Referee: József Erdős

13 June 2010 28	Rákospalota	2–3	Szolnok	Budapest
18:00 CEST (UTC+2)	Dinka 25'; Nyerges 37'	Report	Kotula 10'; Lengyel 30'; Balogh (yellow card) 48'; de Paula 67' (pen.); G. Hegedűs (yellow card) 73'; Z. Nagy I (yellow card) 80'	Stadium: Stadion Budai II. Laszló; Attendance: 300; Referee: Gábor Péter Kovács

=== Magyar Kupa ===
20 August 2009 Second round	Szügy	0–4	Rákospalota	Szügy
16:30 CEST (UTC+2)	Szilágyi (yellow card) 20'	Report	Cseri (yellow card) 24'; Koós 31', 48'; T. Kiss 39'; Merczel 57'; Pomper 71'	Stadium: Szügyi Sportpálya; Referee: Gergő Janitz

16 September 2009 Third round	Balassagyarmat	1–7	Rákospalota	Balassagyarmat
	Bánáti 29'	Report	Pomper 3'; Z. Varga 12', 76'; Dobos 17', 81'; Nyerges 43'; Gasparik 68'	Stadium: Nagyligeti Sporttelep; Referee: Szabolcs Fenyvesi

30 September 2009 Round of 32	Rákospalota	1–4	Szolnok	Budapest
	Gasparik (yellow card) 55'; M. Tóth (yellow card) 66'; T. Kiss 82'	Report	Kotula 39', 49'; Antal 65', (yellow card) 90'; Bardi 75'	Stadium: Stadion Budai II. Laszló; Attendance: 100; Referee: Szabolcs Fenyvesi

== Statistics ==
=== Overall ===
Appearances (Apps) numbers are for appearances in competitive games only, including sub appearances.
Source: Competitions

No.	Player	Pos.	Nemzeti Bajnokság I				Magyar Kupa				Total			
No.	Player	Pos.	Apps	Goal	Booked	Red card	Apps	Goal	Booked	Red card	Apps	Goal	Booked	Red card
1	(Hungary) Mátyás Esterházy	GK	4		1		1				5		1	
1	(Hungary) Gergely Szalay	GK												
1	(Hungary) Csaba Somogyi	GK	14								14			
2	(Hungary) Balázs Dinka	DF	18	1			2				20	1		
3	(Hungary) György Bernáth	DF					1				1			
4	(Hungary) Máté Tóth	DF	8	1	1		1		1		9	1	2	
5	(Hungary) Balázs Sallai	DF	26		3						26		3	
6	(Hungary) Róbert Zsolnai	MF												
7	(Hungary) Gergő Cseri	MF	24	3	5		2		1		26	3	6	
8	(Hungary) Vince Kapcsos	DF	25	4	5		2				27	4	5	
9	(Hungary) Zoltán Varga	MF	11	2	4		3	2			14	4	4	
9	(Hungary) Péter Pölöskei	FW	11	8	5						11	8	5	
10	(Hungary) Gábor Torma	FW	24	12	1						24	12	1	
11	(Hungary) Krisztián Nyerges	FW	28	22	2		1	1			29	23	2	
12	(Hungary) Csaba Borszéki	GK	4				2				6			
12	(Hungary) Péter Tóth	GK												
13	(Hungary) Tamás Kiss	MF	10		1		3	2			13	2	1	
14	(Hungary) Balázs Kovács	MF	22	1	5		2				24	1	5	
15	(Hungary) Roland Dancs	MF	26	6	7		2				28	6	7	
16	(Hungary) László Novák													
16	(Hungary) Dániel Illyés	GK	7		1						7		1	
16	(Hungary) Gellért Vajda	GK												
18	(Hungary) Attila Dobos	MF	13	1	2		2	2			15	3	2	
18	(Hungary) Balázs Gáspár	MF	3								3			
19	(Hungary) Gábor Koós	FW	13	3			2	2			15	5		
19	(Hungary) Zoltán Gáspár	MF	4								4			
20	(Hungary) Botond Birtalan	FW	12	4							12	4		
21	(Hungary) Roland Lipcsei	MF	21	2	1	1	3				24	2	1	1
22	(Hungary) Gergő Jeremiás	MF	24	4	4		2				26	4	4	
23	(Hungary) Milán Bánhalmi	MF					1				1			
24	(Hungary) Tamás Hajdú	MF												
24	(Hungary) Balázs Oláh	MF												
25	(Hungary) Tibor Pomper	DF	8	1	2	1	2	2			10	3	2	1
25	(Hungary) Attila Szili	MF	6								6			
26	(Hungary) Tamás Gasparik	DF	1				3	1	1		4	1	1	
27	(Hungary) Károly Nagy	FW	1				2				3			
28	(Hungary) Richárd Gamal	MF	2				1				3			
29	(Hungary) Zsolt Merczel	DF	1				2	1			3	1		
30	(Hungary) Károly Illés	MF	1								1			
33	(Hungary) Zoltán Kovács	DF	12		1						12		1	
Own goals				1										
Totals				75	51	2		13	3			88	54	2

=== Hat-tricks ===
No.	Player	Against	Result	Date	Competition	Round
11	(Hungary) Krisztián Nyerges	Szolnok	3–3 (A)	14 November 2009	Nemzeti Bajnokság II	14
9	(Hungary) Péter Pölöskei	Makó	7–1 (A)	21 March 2010	Nemzeti Bajnokság II	17

=== Clean sheets ===
			Clean sheets		
No.	Player	Games Played	Nemzeti Bajnokság I	Magyar Kupa	Total
1	(Hungary) Csaba Somogyi	14	3		3
1	(Hungary) Mátyás Esterházy	5	2	1	3
16	(Hungary) Dániel Illyés	7	2		2
12	(Hungary) Csaba Borszéki	6	1	0	1
1	(Hungary) Gergely Szalay	0			0
12	(Hungary) Péter Tóth	0			0
16	(Hungary) Gellért Vajda	0			0
Totals			8	1	9
