= List of Rákospalotai EAC managers =

Rákospalotai Egyetértés Atlétikai Club is a Hungarian association football club based in Rákospalota, Budapest.

== List of managers ==
The complete list of Rákospalota managers is shown in the following table:

Statistics correct as of 23 May 2026. Only competitive matches are counted, including:

- League: Nemzeti Bajnokság I, Nemzeti Bajnokság II, Nemzeti Bajnokság III, Megyei Bajnokság I
- National cup: Magyar Kupa
- League cup: Ligakupa
- Other: Budapest Kupa, Magyar Kupa qualification rounds, Play-off matches

Manager	Nat.	From	To	G	W	D	L	GF	GA	Win%	Honours	Refs
Zoltán Hatvanger	HUN	1991	1992	15	4	5	6	24	20	26.67		
László Szokolai	HUN	17 January 1992	28 May 1992	12	3	3	6	9	19	25.00		
Sándor Szabó	HUN	28 May 1992	1992	3	1	1	1	5	5	33.33		
József Dálnoki	HUN	1992	23 December 1993	47	21	9	17	75	59	44.68	1 Nemzeti Bajnokság III	
Imre Garaba	HUN	23 December 1993	1994	15	5	3	7	19	25	33.33		
Péter Antal	HUN	1994	1996	60	39	12	9	132	46	65.00		
Béla Hegedűs	HUN	1996	September 1996	9	5	0	4	10	8	55.56		
László Kiss	HUN	September 1996	September 1999	88	35	22	31	130	119	39.77		
József Szilvási	HUN	September 1999	September 1999	2	1	1	0	6	2	50.00		
Bálint Tóth	HUN	September 1999	16 April 2000	17	3	2	12	22	44	17.65		
Ferenc Molnár	HUN	16 April 2000	June 2000	11	1	1	9	9	24	9.09		
Béla Hornyák	HUN	June 2000	2000	1	0	0	1	1	2	0.00		
Gábor Híres	HUN	17 July 2000	2001	34	10	6	18	35	59	29.41		
Tibor Simon^{p}	HUN	3 July 2001	11 December 2001	23	12	7	4	49	24	52.17		
Róbert Kutasi^{s}	HUN	11 December 2001	April 2002	8	1	3	4	9	13	12.50		
József Csábi	HUN	April 2002	8 July 2002	5	2	0	3	5	7	40.00		
Géza Mészöly	HUN	8 July 2002	19 February 2004	54	26	11	17	87	70	48.15		
György Bognár	HUN	24 February 2004	9 June 2004	19	7	5	7	25	21	36.84		
Flórián Urbán	HUN	11 June 2004	29 August 2006	65	24	16	25	89	96	36.92		
Zoltán Aczél	HUN	2 September 2006	9 November 2008	99	28	22	49	155	207	28.28		
Sándor Nagy^{c}	ROUHUN	10 November 2008	15 December 2008	5	2	1	2	9	9	40.00		
Tamás Hevesi	HUN	15 December 2008	30 April 2009	11	2	2	7	10	22	18.18		
Sándor Nagy	ROUHUN	30 April 2009	22 April 2010	29	13	6	10	74	46	44.83		
János Mátyus	HUN	23 April 2010	12 June 2014	135	52	29	54	225	205	38.52		
József Dzurják	HUN	7 July 2014	16 October 2015	43	15	13	15	68	79	34.88		
Balázs Dinka	HUN	16 October 2015	20 July 2017	59	19	9	31	77	105	32.20		
László Balogh	HUN	20 July 2017	August 2018	42	32	7	3	146	24	76.19	1 Megyei Bajnokság I 1 Budapest Kupa	
Balázs Lászka	HUN	August 2018	4 June 2019	32	24	6	2	98	12	75.00		
Balázs Dinka	HUN	4 June 2019	2022	91	55	19	17	226	95	60.44		
Sándor Nagy	ROUHUN	2022	March 2023	20	13	1	6	53	24	65.00		
Balázs Dinka^{c}	HUN	March 2023	March 2023	2	2	0	0	3	0	100.00		
Zsombor Käfer	HUN	March 2023	August 2023	16	11	2	3	36	23	68.75		
Balázs Dinka^{c}	HUN	August 2023	September 2023	1	1	0	0	4	2	100.00		
József Farkas	HUN	September 2023	March 2024	13	4	0	9	11	31	30.77		
Zsolt Kollár^{p}	HUN	March 2024	17 April 2024	6	0	1	5	5	14	0.00		
Balázs Dinka^{i}	HUN	17 April 2024	2024	6	1	1	4	9	13	16.67		
Zoltán Molnár	HUN	2024	Present	70	32	12	26	135	105	45.71		
Manager	Nat.	From	To	G	W	D	L	GF	GA	Win%	Honours	Notes

Key:

- ^{s} = Sporting director
- ^{c} = Caretaker manager
- ^{p} = Player-manager
- ^{i} = Interim manager
