= Sándor Nagy (footballer, born 1972) =

Football manager (born 1972)

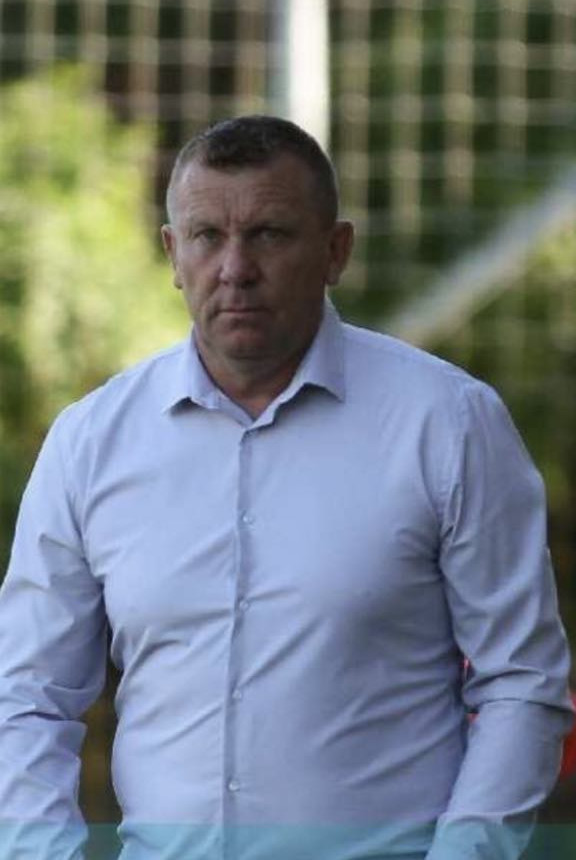

Personal information
- Date of birth: 26 September 1972 (age 54)
- Place of birth: Baraolt, Romania
- Height: 1.85 m (6 ft 1 in)
- Position: Defender

Youth career
- Köpeci Akarat
- Amnerul Baraolt

Senior career*
Years	Team	Apps	(Gls)
- Imasa Sfântu Gheorghe
1992–1995	MTK	42	(6)
1995–1996	BKV Előre	12	(0)
1996–1998	Diósgyőr	51	(7)
1998–2001	Nyírség-Spartacus	68	(6)
2001–2002	Tatabánya	7	(0)
2002	Pápa	17	(3)
2002–2003	Kecskemét	9	(0)
2003–2004	Demecser	15	(4)
2004–2006	Mátészalka	12	(2)
2006	Ibrány		
2006–2008	Rakamaz	8	(2)
2008–2009	Albertirsa	7	(1)
2009–2010	Erdőkertes	0	(0)
2010	Tura	1	(0)
2010–2011	Kék	21	(5)
2011–2013	Nyíregyházi Old-Boys	32	(36)
2013–2014	Grund Focisuli	19	(14)
Total		321	(86)

Managerial career
- 2008: Rákospalota (caretaker)
- 2009–2010: Rákospalota
- 2017: Sepsi OSK (caretaker)
- 2019–2020: Kisvárda II
- 2020–2021: Tiszakécske
- 2022–2023: Rákospalota
- 2023–2024: Sényő
- * Club domestic league appearances and goals

Sándor Nagy (born 26 September 1972) is a Romanian-Hungarian football manager and former player who played as a defender.

== Managerial career ==
=== Rákospalota ===
On 10 November 2008, Nagy was appointed caretaker manager of Nemzeti Bajnokság I club Rákospalota following the dismissal of Zoltán Aczél, remaining in charge until Tamás Hevesi was appointed manager on 15 December.

On 30 April 2009, Nagy was appointed interim manager of Rákospalota after the resignation of Tamás Hevesi. The club announced that Nagy would take over the team's professional management for an indefinite period. On 16 June, Rákospalota confirmed that Nagy would remain in charge of the first team for the 2009–10 season following the club's relegation to the second division. However, on 22 April 2010, Nagy left the club by mutual agreement after Rákospalota's 2–1 defeat to Vác left the team fourth in the Nemzeti Bajnokság II East group and eight points behind the promotion places.

=== Sepsi OSK ===
Following the dismissal of Valentin Suciu on 25 October 2017, Nagy and László Kulcsár assumed interim charge of Liga I club Sepsi OSK. His spell as caretaker manager ended on 14 November, when Eugen Neagoe was appointed manager.

=== Tiszakécske ===
On 2 July 2020, Nagy was appointed manager of Tiszakécske. During the 2020–21 season, he guided the club to the Nemzeti Bajnokság III East group title and promotion to the Nemzeti Bajnokság II. On 21 August 2021, Tiszakécske announced that Nagy would leave his position after the team had collected one point from its opening four matches of the 2021–22 Nemzeti Bajnokság II season.

=== Sényő ===
On 15 November 2023, Nagy was appointed manager of Sényő, with the club occupying 14th place in the Nemzeti Bajnokság III Northeast group at the time of his appointment. He left the club at the end of the 2023–24 season on 27 June 2024 after overseeing 15 matches.

== Personal life ==
In a 2020 interview, Nagy identified as Székely.

== Career statistics ==
=== Club ===
Appearances and goals by club, season and competition
Club	Season	League			National cup (Note: Includes Magyar Kupa)		Europe		Other		Total	
Club	Season	Division	Apps	Goals	Apps	Goals	Apps	Goals	Apps	Goals	Apps	Goals
MTK	1992–93	Nemzeti Bajnokság I	8	0	3	0	—		—		11	0
MTK	1993–94	Nemzeti Bajnokság I	10	1	1	0	3 (Note: Appearances in UEFA Cup)	0	—		14	1
MTK	1994–95	Nemzeti Bajnokság II	24	5	6	9	—		—		30	14
MTK	Total		42	6	10	9	3	0	—		55	15
BKV Előre	1995–96	Nemzeti Bajnokság II	12	0	2	0	—		—		14	0
Diósgyőr	1995–96	Nemzeti Bajnokság II	14	3	—		—		—		14	3
Diósgyőr	1996–97	Nemzeti Bajnokság II	27	4	5	0	—		—		32	4
Diósgyőr	1997–98	Nemzeti Bajnokság I	10	0	3	0	—		—		13	0
Diósgyőr	Total		51	7	8	0	—		—		59	7
Nyírség-Spartacus	1998–99	Nemzeti Bajnokság I	26	3	3	1	—		—		29	4
Nyírség-Spartacus	1999–2000	Nemzeti Bajnokság I	29	3	2	1	—		—		31	4
Nyírség-Spartacus	2000–01	Nemzeti Bajnokság I	13	0	2	1	—		—		15	1
Nyírség-Spartacus	Total		68	6	7	3	—		—		75	9
Tatabánya	2000–01	Nemzeti Bajnokság I	7	0	—		—		—		7	0
Pápa	2001–02	Nemzeti Bajnokság II	17	3	—		—		—		17	3
Kecskemét	2001–02	Nemzeti Bajnokság II	9	0	—		—		—		9	0
Demecser	2002–03	Nemzeti Bajnokság II	15	4	—		—		—		14	4
Mátészalka	2002–03	Nemzeti Bajnokság III	12	2	—		—		—		12	2
Mátészalka	2003–04	Nemzeti Bajnokság III			—		—		—			
Mátészalka	Total		12	2	—		—		—		12	2
Ibrány	2003–04	Nemzeti Bajnokság III			—		—		—			
Ibrány	2004–05	Nemzeti Bajnokság III			1	0	—		—		1	0
Ibrány	2005–06	Nemzeti Bajnokság III			—		—		—			
Ibrány	Total				1	0	—		—		1	0
Rakamaz	2006–07	Nemzeti Bajnokság III	8	2	—		—		—		8	2
Albertirsa	2007–08	Megyei Bajnokság II	3	0	—		—		—		3	0
Albertirsa	2007–08	Megyei Bajnokság II	4	1	—		—		—		4	1
Albertirsa	Total		7	1	—		—		—		7	1
Tura	2009–10	Nemzeti Bajnokság III	1	0	—		—		—		1	0
Kék	2010–11	Megyei Bajnokság II	21	5	1	0	—		—		22	5
Nyíregyházi Old-Boys	2011–12	Megyei Bajnokság III	20	32	—		—		—		20	32
Nyíregyházi Old-Boys	2012–13	Megyei Bajnokság II	12	4	—		—		—		12	4
Nyíregyházi Old-Boys	Total		32	36	—		—		—		32	36
Grund Focisuli	2013–14	Megyei Bajnokság III	15	13	—		—		1 (Note: Appearance in Magyar Kupa qualifying rounds)	0	16	13
Grund Focisuli	2014–15	Megyei Bajnokság II	4	1	—		—		—		4	1
Grund Focisuli	Total		19	14	—		—		1	0	20	14
Career total			321	86	29	12	2	0	1	0	353	98

== Managerial statistics ==
Managerial record by team and tenure
Team	From	To	Record								Ref
Team	From	To	P	W	D	L	GF	GA	GD	Win %	Ref
Rákospalota (caretaker)	10 November 2008	15 December 2008	5	2	1	2	9	9	+0	40.00	
Rákospalota	30 April 2009	22 April 2010	29	13	6	10	74	46	+28	44.83	
Sepsi OSK	25 October 2017	14 November 2017	2	0	0	2	0	5	−5	0.00	
Kisvárda II	April 2019	March 2020	28	13	5	10	62	38	+24	46.43	
Tiszakécske	2 July 2020	21 August 2021	43	30	5	8	98	38	+60	69.77	
Rákospalota	2022	March 2023	20	13	1	6	53	24	+29	65.00	
Sényő	15 November 2023	27 June 2024	15	6	4	5	26	21	+5	40.00	
Total			142	77	22	43	322	181	+141	54.23	

== Honours ==
=== Player ===
MTK

- Nemzeti Bajnokság II – East: 1994–95

Nyíregyházi Old-Boys

- Megyei Bajnokság III – Szabolcs–Szatmár–Bereg: 2011–12

Grund Focisuli

- Megyei Bajnokság III – Szabolcs–Szatmár–Bereg: 2013–14

=== Manager ===
Tiszakécske

- Nemzeti Bajnokság III – East: 2020–21
