= Tamás Hevesi =

Hungarian singer and football manager (born 1964)

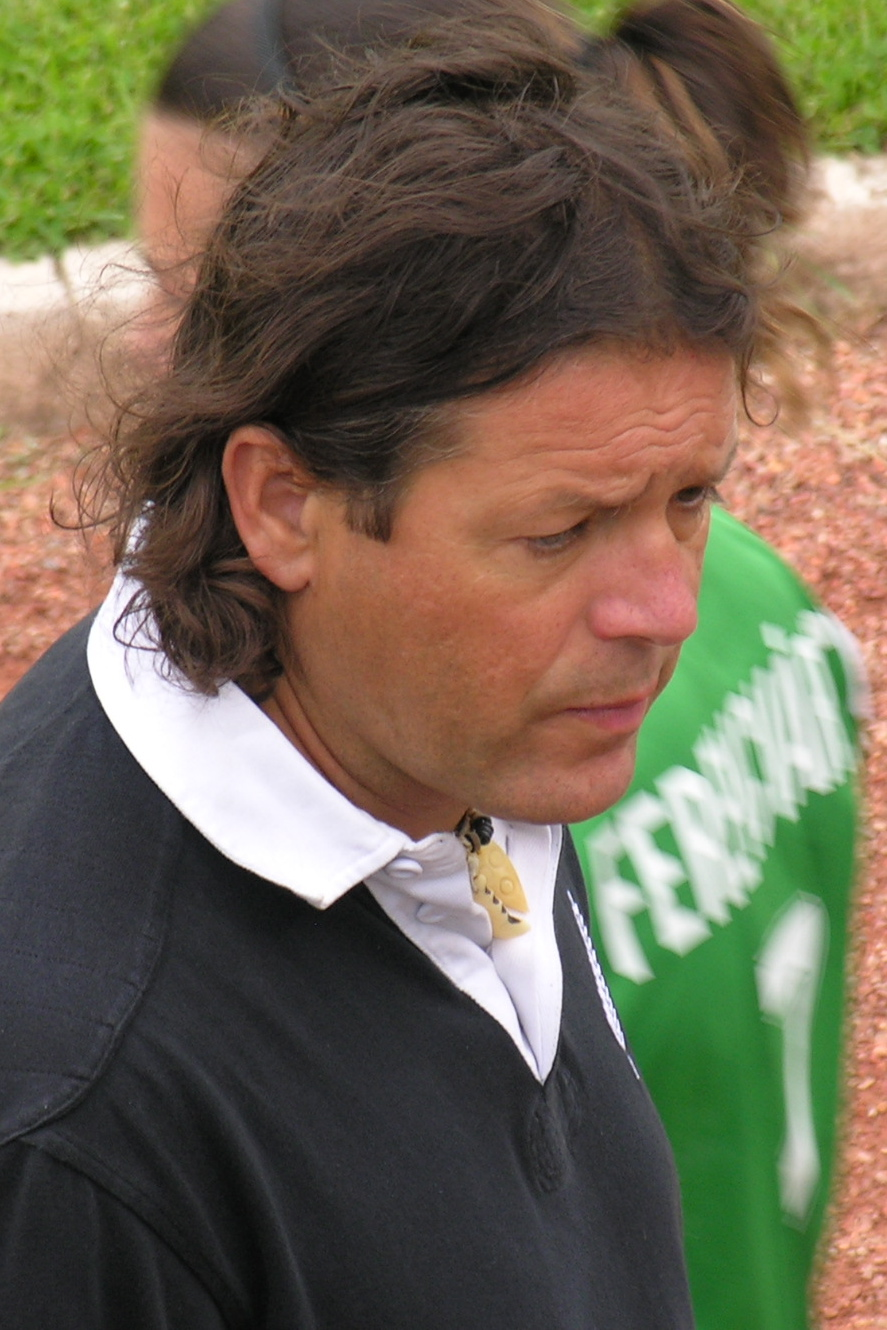
- Hevesi with Ferencváros women's team in 2011
- Born: 20 June 1964 (age 62); Gyula, Hungary
- Occupations: Singer; footballer; football manager
- Spouse: Krisztina Hevesi
- Musical career
- Genres: Rock; Pop
Association football career
- Position: Attacking midfielder
Senior career*
Years	Team	Apps	(Gls)
- Gyula
- Solymár
- Piliscsaba
Managerial career
- 2004–2008: Ferencváros women
- 2008–2009: Rákospalota
- 2010–2011: Ferencváros women
- 2010–2012: Hungary U17 women
- 2013: Rákosmente
- 2018: Pénzügyőr
- 2020–2021: Gödöllői SK
- 2021–2022: Mezőkövesd II
- 2024: Fővárosi Vízművek
- 2024–2025: Budakalász
- * Club domestic league appearances and goals

Tamás Hevesi (born 20 June 1964) is a Hungarian singer and football manager.

== Early life ==
As a footballer, Hevesi made his senior debut at the age of 17 for Nemzeti Bajnokság II club Gyula, where he had previously captained both the club's youth team and the county representative side. He played as an attacking midfielder throughout his career, an experience that later influenced his preference for attacking, proactive football as a manager. After leaving Gyula, he played for Solymár and Piliscsaba in the Pest Megyei Bajnokság I before his playing career took a back seat because of his music career.

== Managerial career ==
=== Ferencváros women ===
Hevesi managed Nemzeti Bajnokság I women's team of Ferencváros for four years before taking charge of Rákospalota during the 2008–09 season.

=== Rákospalota ===
On 15 December 2008, Hevesi was appointed manager of Nemzeti Bajnokság I club Rákospalota with the objective of keeping the side in the top flight. He succeeded interim manager Sándor Nagy, who had taken charge after Zoltán Aczél was dismissed on 8 November. On 30 April 2009, Hevesi left the club after offering his resignation following the club's poor run of form and a 4–0 defeat to Debrecen. His resignation was accepted by club president József Forgács, and Sándor Nagy was again appointed as interim manager while the club shifted its objective to winning the following season's Nemzeti Bajnokság II championship and securing immediate promotion.

=== Return to Ferencváros women ===
At the end of February 2010, Hevesi returned for a second spell as manager of the Nemzeti Bajnokság I women's team of Ferencváros, replacing Pál Kaszás after the mutual termination of his contract. At the time of his appointment, the club were in third place, with the stated minimum objective of retaining that position.

=== Hungary U17 women ===
On 10 March 2010, Hevesi was appointed manager of the Hungary women's national under-17 football team.

=== Rákosmente ===
On 16 February 2013, Hevesi was appointed manager of Nemzeti Bajnokság III club Rákosmente. He left the club after taking up work abroad in his music career, with Béla Heidl taking charge of the team for the Magyar Kupa preliminary-round match on 17 April.

=== Pénzügyőr ===
On 29 June 2018, Hevesi was appointed manager of Nemzeti Bajnokság III club Pénzügyőr. He turned down several managerial opportunities, including one from a Nemzeti Bajnokság II club, and cancelled a planned North American music tour in order to take the position. The club's primary objective for the season was to avoid relegation. On 30 October, Hevesi left Pénzügyőr by mutual consent after 12 league matches in charge, having recorded two wins, two draws and eight defeats in the NB III West Group. He was succeeded for the remainder of the autumn season by Attila Vatai in a sporting adviser role.

=== Gödöllő ===
On 24 June 2020, Hevesi was appointed manager of Pest Megyei Bajnokság I club Gödöllő, replacing Nenad Pozder. After the club finished fifth in the 2020–21 season, Hevesi left the club at his own request on 30 June 2021. He was succeeded by Zoltán Győri.

=== Mezőkövesd II ===
On 26 July 2021, Hevesi was appointed manager of Borsod–Abaúj–Zemplén Megyei Bajnokság I club Mezőkövesd II, replacing Péter Takács.

=== Fővárosi Vízművek ===
On 17 February 2024, Hevesi was appointed manager of Budapest Megyei Bajnokság I club Fővárosi Vízművek, succeeding Géza Mészöly, who had left to become manager of Újpest. On 5 July, Hevesi left the club because other commitments prevented him from continuing in the role. He was replaced by Attila Nahóczky.

=== Budakalász ===
On 6 November 2024, Hevesi was appointed manager of Pest Megyei Bajnokság I club Budakalász, replacing Péter Bajzát after the team's poor start to the season. At the time of his appointment, Budakalász were 13th in the league with six points, while Bajzát remained at the club as under-17 coach. He left Budakalász after the 26th round of the 2024–25 season, with former player and club official Attila Vadas taking charge for the remainder of the campaign.

== Personal life ==
Hevesi is married to psychologist and sexologist Krisztina Hevesi. The couple have deliberately kept their private life out of the public eye and have never publicly disclosed or celebrated their wedding or wedding anniversary.

== Managerial statistics ==
Managerial record by team and tenure
Team	From	To	Record								Ref
Team	From	To	P	W	D	L	GF	GA	GD	Win %	Ref
Rákospalota	15 December 2008	30 April 2009	11	2	2	7	10	22	−12	18.18	
Ferencváros women	27 February 2010	November 2011	59	22	7	30	147	140	+7	37.29	
Rákosmente	16 February 2013	April 2013	6	3	1	2	15	7	+8	50.00	
Pénzügyőr	29 June 2018	30 October 2018	13	3	2	8	12	26	−14	23.08	
Gödöllő	24 June 2020	30 June 2021	32	15	7	10	54	38	+16	46.88	
Mezőkövesd II	26 July 2021	May 2022	30	15	5	10	68	38	+30	50.00	
Fővárosi Vízművek	16 February 2024	5 July 2024	15	3	5	7	17	24	−7	20.00	
Budakalász	6 November 2024	3 May 2025	15	4	3	8	17	30	−13	26.67	
Total			181	67	32	82	340	325	+15	37.02	
