= Gergő Jeremiás =

Hungarian footballer and manager (born 1985)

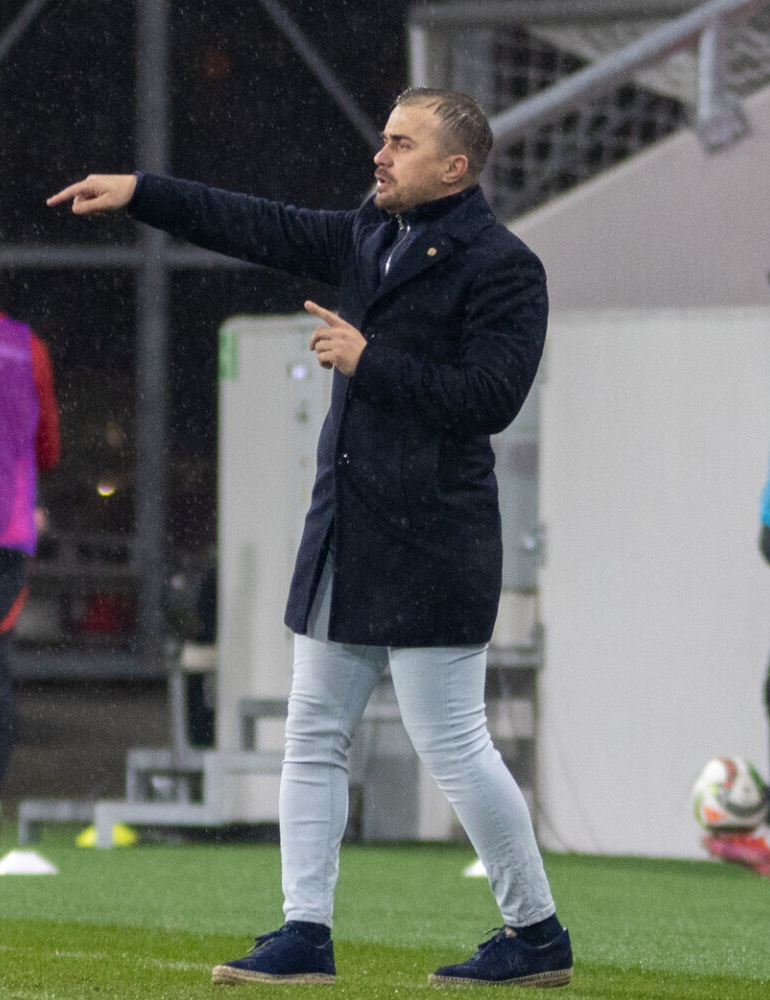
- Jeremiás managing Hungary U19 in 2025

Personal information
- Date of birth: 26 February 1985 (age 41)
- Place of birth: Debrecen, Hungary
- Height: 1.76 m (5 ft 9 in)
- Position: Midfielder

Team information
- Current team: Hungary U17 (manager)

Youth career
- 2002–2005: Debrecen

Senior career*
Years	Team	Apps	(Gls)
2005–2007	Debrecen	3	(0)
2006	→ Diósgyőr (loan)	14	(1)
2006–2007	→ Nyíregyháza (loan)	10	(0)
2007–2008	Bőcs	17	(2)
2008–2010	Rákospalota	51	(5)
2010–2011	Bőcs	14	(5)
2011–2013	Mezőkövesd	47	(6)
2013	Kazincbarcika	13	(0)
2013–2014	Ebes	13	(5)
2014–2018	Hajdúböszörmény	121	(63)
Total		303	(87)

International career
2001–2002	Hungary U17	4	(0)
2003–2004	Hungary U19	6	(0)

Managerial career
- 2021: Debrecen (caretaker)
- 2021–2022: Debrecen (assistant)
- 2022: Debrecen II
- 2022–2023: Szentlőrinc
- 2023–2024: Hungary U17
- 2024–2025: Hungary U19
- 2025–: Hungary U17
- * Club domestic league appearances and goals

Gergő Jeremiás (born 26 February 1985) is a Hungarian professional football manager and former player who is currently in charge of Hungary U17s.

== Managerial career ==
=== Debrecen ===
On 28 October 2021, after Szabolcs Huszti left his role as manager, Jeremiás was named caretaker manager for Nemzeti Bajnokság I club Debrecen. On 8 November, he stepped down as first team coach and joined as an assistant to Joan Carrillo, the newly appointed manager. On 31 May 2022, it was announced that he would take over the management of Debrecen II from János Szűcs, with effect from 1 June, assisted by Péter Máté.

=== Szentlőrinc ===
Shortly after his appointment to the reserve team, Jeremiás joined Szentlőrinc in the Nemzeti Bajnokság II on 5 July. On 27 February 2023, the club agreed to mutually part ways after Szentlőrinc picked up 6 points from the last 12 games and ranked 17th in the table, which is a relegation play-off spot.

=== Hungary U17 ===
In July 2023, he took charge of the Hungary U17s. In the Qualifying round for the 2024 UEFA European Under-17 Championship, the team finished second in their group behind Bulgaria and progressed to the Elite round. They failed to qualify for the European Championship after finishing last in the group behind France, England and Northern Ireland.

=== Hungary U19 ===
In the summer of 2024, Jeremiás was promoted to coach the Hungary U19s.

=== Return To Hungary U17 ===
On 7 October 2025, Jeremiás announced his squad for the first round of qualification for the 2026 UEFA European Under-17 Championship qualification, selecting 21 players to face the Czech Republic, Gibraltar, and host nation North Macedonia.

== Career statistics ==
Appearances and goals by club, season and competition
Club	Season	League			Magyar Kupa		Ligakupa		Europe		Other		Total	
Club	Season	Division	Apps	Goals	Apps	Goals	Apps	Goals	Apps	Goals	Apps	Goals	Apps	Goals
Debrecen	2005–06	Nemzeti Bajnokság I	3	0	1	0	—		1 (Note: Appearances in UEFA Cup)	0	—		5	0
Diósgyőr (loan)	2005–06	Nemzeti Bajnokság I	14	1	—		—		—		—		14	1
Nyíregyháza (loan)	2006–07	Nemzeti Bajnokság II	10	0	1	0	—		—		—		11	0
Bőcs	2007–08	Nemzeti Bajnokság II	17	2	—		—		—		—		17	2
Rákospalota	2008–09	Nemzeti Bajnokság I	27	2	3	1	7	0	—		—		37	3
Rákospalota	2009–10	Nemzeti Bajnokság II	24	3	2	0	—		—		—		26	3
Rákospalota	Total		51	5	5	1	7	0	—		—		63	6
Bőcs	2010–11	Nemzeti Bajnokság II	14	5	3	0	—		—		—		17	5
Mezőkövesd	2010–11	Nemzeti Bajnokság II	15	4	—		—		—		—		15	4
Mezőkövesd	2011–12	Nemzeti Bajnokság II	24	2	1	0	3	0	—		—		28	2
Mezőkövesd	2012–13	Nemzeti Bajnokság II	8	0	2	0	—		—		—		10	0
Mezőkövesd	Total		47	6	3	0	3	0	—		—		53	6
Kazincbarcika	2012–13	Nemzeti Bajnokság II	12	0	—		—		—		—		12	0
Ebes	2013–14	Nemzeti Bajnokság III	13	5	1	0	—		—		—		14	5
Hajdúböszörmény	2013–14	Nemzeti Bajnokság III	11	2	—		—		—		—		11	2
Hajdúböszörmény	2014–15	Nemzeti Bajnokság III	26	4	1	0	—		—		—		27	4
Hajdúböszörmény	2015–16	Megyei Bajnokság I	30	15	2	0	—		—		3 (Note: Appearances in Magyar Kupa qualifying rounds)	3	35	18
Hajdúböszörmény	2016–17	Nemzeti Bajnokság III	30	3	1	0	—		—		—		31	3
Hajdúböszörmény	2017–18	Megyei Bajnokság I	24	39	—		—		—		7 (Note: Two appearances in Magyar Kupa qualifying rounds, three appearances and two goals in Hajdú-Bihar County Cup, two appearances and one goal in Megyei Bajnokság I Promotion play-offs)	3	31	42
Hajdúböszörmény	Total		121	63	5	0	—		—		10	6	136	69
Career total			303	87	18	1	10	0	1	0	10	6	342	94
