= Csaba Borszéki =

Hungarian footballer

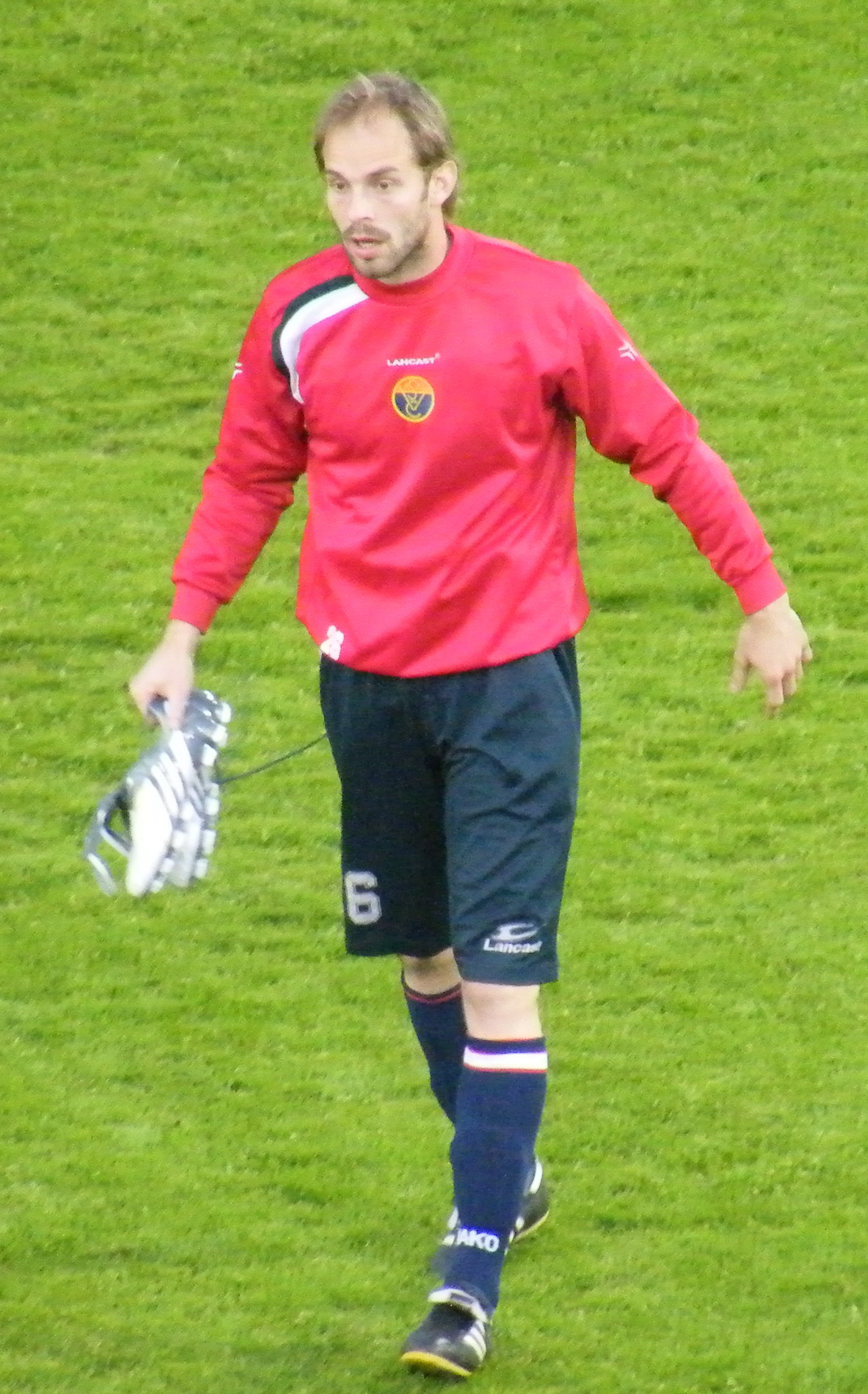

Personal information
- Full name: Csaba Borszéki
- Date of birth: 15 September 1983 (age 43)
- Place of birth: Budapest, Hungary
- Height: 1.88 m (6 ft 2 in)
- Position: Goalkeeper

Senior career*
Years	Team	Apps	(Gls)
2004–2005	Dunakanyar-Vác FC	19	(0)
2005–2009	Vasas SC	17	(0)
2009–2010	Rákospalotai EAC	4	(0)
2011–2012	Dunakanyar-Vác FC	8	(0)
2012–2013	Kecskeméti TE	13	(0)
- * Club domestic league appearances and goals as of 14 August 2015

Csaba Borszéki (born 15 September 1983 in Budapest) is a retired Hungarian football player who last played for Kecskeméti TE.
