= Gábor Torma =

Hungarian footballer (born 1976)

Personal information
- Date of birth: 1 August 1976 (age 50)
- Place of birth: Dunaújváros, Hungary
- Height: 1.82 m (6 ft 0 in)
- Position: Striker

Senior career*
Years	Team	Apps	(Gls)
1992–1993	Dunaferr	24	(8)
1993–1997	Cercle Brugge	74	(27)
1997–2001	Roda JC	52	(10)
2001–2002	FC Groningen	4	(0)
2002–2003	ADO Den Haag	12	(5)
2003–2004	RKC Waalwijk	9	(0)
2004–2005	AEL Limassol	7	(2)
2005	Zalaegerszeg	7	(0)
2005–2010	Rákospalota	131	(50)
Total		321	(102)

International career
1996–1997	Hungary	7	(0)
- * Club domestic league appearances and goals

Gábor Torma (born 1 August 1976) is a Hungarian former professional footballer who played as a striker.

== Career ==
Born in Dunaújváros, Torma started his career at Dunaferr, from where he was signed by Cercle Brugge in 1994 to replace Belgian international Josip Weber. He spent three years at the club, and in the 1996–97 season he became the top goalscorer of the team.

Due to his exceptional club performance he was called up to the Hungary national team in 1996, where he gained seven caps. After János Csank's resignation in late 1997 he was not called up to the team again.

In 1997, he signed for Dutch side Roda JC, and spent the next seven seasons in the Eredivisie, also playing for FC Groningen, ADO Den Haag and RKC Waalwijk. However, he could not any more reach the level of his performances with Brugge, and in 2004 he left the Netherlands for AEL Limassol in Cyprus.

In 2005, he returned to Hungary and played a while for Zalaegerszeg, before moving to Rákospalota.

== Career statistics ==
=== Club ===
Appearances and goals by club, season and competition
Club	Season	League			National cup (Note: Includes KNVB Cup, Magyar Kupa)		League cup (Note: Includes Ligakupa)		Europe		Other		Total	
Club	Season	Division	Apps	Goals	Apps	Goals	Apps	Goals	Apps	Goals	Apps	Goals	Apps	Goals
Dunaferr	1992–93	Nemzeti Bajnokság II	24	8			—		—		—		24	8
Cercle Brugge	1994–95	Belgian First Division	22	3			—		—		—		22	3
Cercle Brugge	1995–96	Belgian First Division	20	6			—		—		—		20	6
Cercle Brugge	1996–97	Belgian First Division	33	18			—		2 (Note: Appearances in European Cup Winners' Cup)	0	—		35	18
Cercle Brugge	Total		75	27			—		2	0	—		77	27
Roda JC	1997–98	Eredivisie	19	5			—		3	4	—		22	9
Roda JC	1998–99	Eredivisie	18	2	4	4	—		—		—		22	6
Roda JC	1999–2000	Eredivisie	4	2	—		—		—		—		4	2
Roda JC	2000–01	Eredivisie	11	1	1	1	—		1 (Note: Appearance in UEFA Cup)	0	1 (Note: Appearance in Johan Cruyff Shield)	0	14	2
Roda JC	Total		52	10	5	5	—		4	4	1	0	62	19
FC Groningen	2001–02	Eredivisie	4	0	4	2	—		—		—		8	2
ADO Den Haag	2002–03	Eerste Divisie	12	5	—		—		—		—		12	5
RKC Waalwijk	2003–04	Eredivisie	9	0	—		—		—		—		9	0
AEL Limassol	2004–05	Cypriot First Division	7	2	—		—		—		—		7	2
Zalaegerszeg	2004–05	Nemzeti Bajnokság I	7	0	—		—		—		—		7	0
Rákospalota	2005–06	Nemzeti Bajnokság I	25	4	3	2	—		—		—		28	6
Rákospalota	2006–07	Nemzeti Bajnokság I	29	15	4	6	—		—		—		33	21
Rákospalota	2007–08	Nemzeti Bajnokság I	26	11	2	3	6	3	—		—		34	17
Rákospalota	2008–09	Nemzeti Bajnokság I	20	6	3	3	6	4	—		—		29	13
Rákospalota	2009–10	Nemzeti Bajnokság II	24	12	—		—		—		—		24	12
Rákospalota	2010–11	Nemzeti Bajnokság II	7	2	1	0	—		—		—		8	2
Rákospalota	Total		131	50	13	14	12	7	—		—		156	71
Career total			321	102	22	21	12	7	6	4	1	0	362	134

=== International ===
Appearances and goals by national team and year
Team	Year	Total	
Team	Year	Apps	Goals
Hungary	1996	3	0
Hungary	1997	4	0
Total		7	0

== Honours ==
Cercle Brugge

- Belgian Cup runner-up: 1995–96

Roda JC

- KNVB Cup: 1999–2000

ADO Den Haag

- Eerste Divisie: 2002–03
