= Tamás Kiss (footballer, born 1987) =

Hungarian footballer

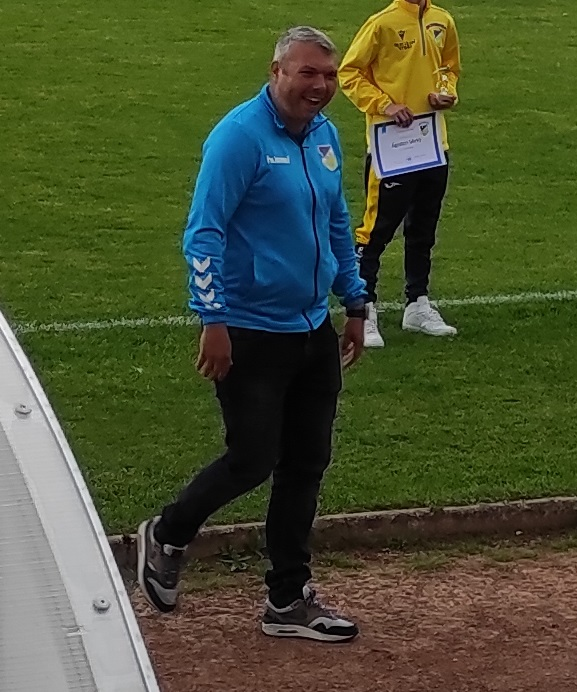
- Kiss with Rákospalota in 2025

Personal information
- Date of birth: 22 October 1987 (age 39)
- Place of birth: Budapest, Hungary
- Height: 1.76 m (5 ft 9 in)
- Position: Midfielder

Team information
- Current team: REAC Sportiskola
- Number: 10

Youth career
- 2002–2006: Rákospalota

Senior career*
Years	Team	Apps	(Gls)
2006–2010	Rákospalota	26	(1)
2007–2009	Rákospalota II	24	(9)
2010–2011	Budaörs	8	(1)
2011–2013	Rákospalota	29	(5)
2012	→ Vasas (loan)	5	(0)
2012	→ Vasas II (loan)	3	(3)
2013	Cegléd	13	(1)
2013	Siófok	0	(0)
2013–2024	Rákospalota	182	(52)
2025–	REAC Sportiskola	4	(3)
- * Club domestic league appearances and goals as of 3 October 2025

Tamás Kiss (born 22 October 1987) is a Hungarian professional footballer who plays as a midfielder for Megyei Bajnokság III club REAC Sportiskola. He spent the majority of his career with Rákospalota, and also played for Vasas in the Nemzeti Bajnokság I.

== Club career ==
On 25 January 2012, he was sent on a half-season loan to Nemzeti Bajnokság I side Vasas, reuniting with his former Rákospalota manager Flórián Urbán.

On 22 June 2013, Kiss moved to newly relegated Siófok in the Nemzeti Bajnokság II. However, he had to look for a new team after his contract was terminated for professional reasons soon before he could play in the friendly against Újbuda.

== Club statistics ==
As of match played 3 October 2025

Appearances and goals by club, season and competition
Club	Season	League			Magyar Kupa		Ligakupa		Other		Total	
Club	Season	Division	Apps	Goals	Apps	Goals	Apps	Goals	Apps	Goals	Apps	Goals
Rákospalota	2006–07	Nemzeti Bajnokság I	1	0	—		—		—		1	0
Rákospalota	2007–08	Nemzeti Bajnokság I	5	0	1	1	12	3	—		18	4
Rákospalota	2008–09	Nemzeti Bajnokság I	10	1	0	0	9	0	—		19	1
Rákospalota	2009–10	Nemzeti Bajnokság II	10	0	3	2	—		—		13	2
Rákospalota	Total		26	1	4	3	21	3	—		51	7
Rákospalota II	2007–08	Nemzeti Bajnokság III	15	3	—		—		—		15	3
Rákospalota II	2008–09	Megyei Bajnokság I	9	6	—		—		—		9	6
Rákospalota II	Total		24	9	—		—		—		24	9
Budaörs	2010–11	Nemzeti Bajnokság II	8	1	2	2	—		—		10	3
Rákospalota	2010–11	Nemzeti Bajnokság II	15	2	—		—		—		15	2
Rákospalota	2011–12	Nemzeti Bajnokság II	14	3	2	0	—		—		16	3
Rákospalota	Total		29	5	2	0	—		—		31	5
Vasas (loan)	2011–12	Nemzeti Bajnokság I	5	0	—		—		—		5	0
Vasas II (loan)	2011–12	Nemzeti Bajnokság III	3	3	—		—		—		3	3
Cegléd	2012–13	Nemzeti Bajnokság II	13	1	—		—		2 (Note: Appearances in Nemzeti Bajnokság II relegation play-offs)	1	15	2
Rákospalota	2013–14	Nemzeti Bajnokság III	27	2	—		—		—		27	2
Rákospalota	2014–15	Nemzeti Bajnokság III	23	6	2	0	—		—		25	6
Rákospalota	2015–16	Nemzeti Bajnokság III	23	8	1	1	—		—		24	9
Rákospalota	2016–17	Nemzeti Bajnokság III	33	8	3	3	—		—		36	11
Rákospalota	2017–18	Megyei Bajnokság I	26	13	—		—		7 (Note: One appearance in Magyar Kupa qualifying rounds, four appearances and one goal in Budapest Kupa, two appearances in Megyei Bajnokság I promotion play-offs)	1	33	14
Rákospalota	2018–19	Megyei Bajnokság I	15	5	—		—		1 (Note: Appearance in Magyar Kupa qualifying rounds)	0	16	5
Rákospalota	2019–20	Megyei Bajnokság I	2	0	—		—		1 (Note: Appearance(s) in Budapest Kupa)	0	3	0
Rákospalota	2020–21	Megyei Bajnokság I	19	9	—		—		1	0	20	9
Rákospalota	2021–22	Megyei Bajnokság I	13	1	—		—		2	2	15	3
Rákospalota	2022–23	Megyei Bajnokság I	0	0	—		—		—		0	0
Rákospalota	2023–24	Nemzeti Bajnokság III	1	0	—		—		—		1	0
Rákospalota	Total		182	52	6	4	—		12	3	200	59
REAC Sportiskola	2025–26	Megyei Bajnokság III	4	3	—		—		1	0	5	3
Career total			294	75	14	9	21	3	15	4	344	91

== Honours ==
Rákospalota

- Megyei Bajnokság I – Budapest: 2017–18
- Budapest Kupa: 2017–18
