= Balázs Sallai =

Hungarian footballer (born 1979)

Personal information
- Date of birth: 24 September 1979 (age 47)
- Place of birth: Várpalota, Hungary
- Height: 1.76 m (5 ft 9 in)
- Position: Defender

Youth career
- –2000: Vasas

Senior career*
Years	Team	Apps	(Gls)
1999–2000	Vasas	5	(0)
2000–2003	Kecskemét	61	(4)
2003–2004	Budapesti Vasas	23	(4)
2004–2005	Kecskemét	21	(0)
2005–2011	Rákospalota	135	(0)
2011	Szigetszentmiklós	12	(0)
2011	Eger	10	(0)
2017	Várpalota	2	(0)
Total		269	(8)
- * Club domestic league appearances and goals

Balázs Sallai (born 24 September 1979) is a Hungarian former professional footballer who played as a defender.

== Career ==
=== Rákospalota ===
On 9 July 2005, Sallai signed a one-year contract to join Rákospalota for the club's first-ever season in the top flight of Hungarian football.

On 11 September, he scored his first competitive goal for REAC, contributing to a 5–0 away victory over Jánossomorja in the Magyar Kupa, and his second and final goal came on 12 November 2008 in a 2–3 home defeat to Ferencváros in the Ligakupa.

=== Szigetszentmiklós ===
In the 2011 winter transfer window, he signed for Szigetszentmiklós, a Nemzeti Bajnokság II – West club, making a switch from the Eastern division. Earlier that season, he had faced and defeated Szigetszentmiklós in the Magyar Kupa before joining them for the second half of the campaign.

== Career statistics ==
Appearances and goals by club, season and competition
Club	Season	League			Magyar Kupa		Ligakupa		Total	
Club	Season	Division	Apps	Goals	Apps	Goals	Apps	Goals	Apps	Goals
Vasas	1998–99	Nemzeti Bajnokság I	2	0	1	0	—		3	0
Vasas	1999–2000	Nemzeti Bajnokság I	3	0	—		—		3	0
Vasas	Total		5	0	1	0	—		6	0
Kecskemét	2000–01	Nemzeti Bajnokság II	17	0	—		—		17	0
Kecskemét	2001–02	Nemzeti Bajnokság II	26	3	3	0	—		29	3
Kecskemét	2002–03	Nemzeti Bajnokság II	18	1	—		—		18	1
Kecskemét	Total		61	4	3	0	—		64	4
Budapesti Vasas	2003–04	Nemzeti Bajnokság II	23	4	2	0	—		25	4
Kecskemét	2004–05	Nemzeti Bajnokság II	21	0	1	0	—		22	0
Rákospalota	2005–06	Nemzeti Bajnokság I	22	0	4	1	—		26	1
Rákospalota	2006–07	Nemzeti Bajnokság I	23	0	2	0	—		25	0
Rákospalota	2007–08	Nemzeti Bajnokság I	28	0	1	0	7	0	36	0
Rákospalota	2008–09	Nemzeti Bajnokság I	28	0	3	0	6	1	37	1
Rákospalota	2009–10	Nemzeti Bajnokság II	26	0	—		—		26	0
Rákospalota	2010–11	Nemzeti Bajnokság II	8	0	2	0	—		10	0
Rákospalota	Total		135	0	12	1	13	1	160	2
Szigetszentmiklós	2010–11	Nemzeti Bajnokság II	12	0	—		—		12	0
Eger	2011–12	Nemzeti Bajnokság II	10	0	1	0	—		11	0
Várpalota	2017–18	Megyei Bajnokság I	2	0	—		—		2	0
Career total			269	8	20	1	13	1	302	10

== Honours ==
Eger

- Nemzeti Bajnokság II – East: 2011–12
