= Árpád Ambrusz =

Hungarian footballer and coach (born 1980)

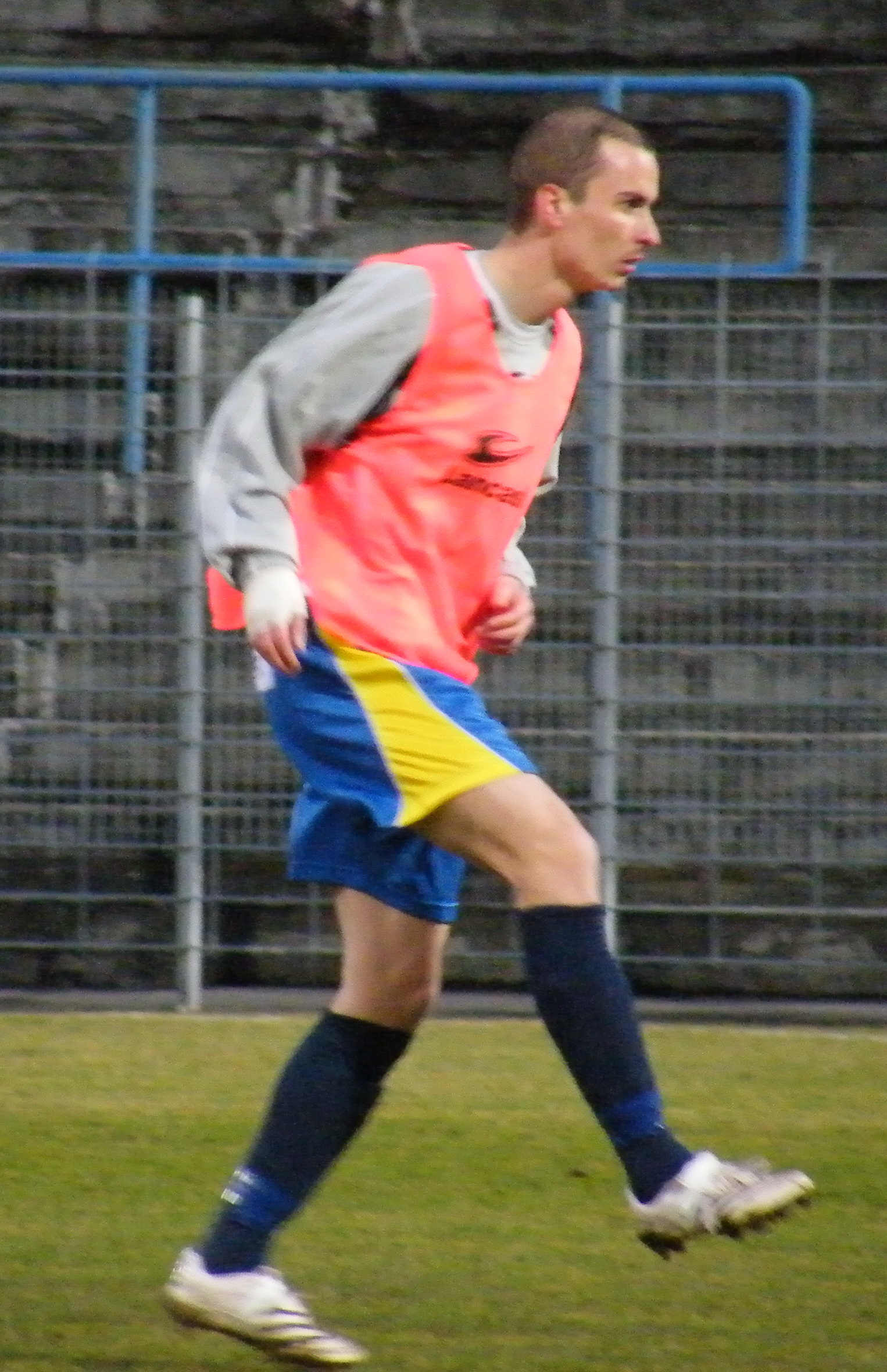

Personal information
- Date of birth: 2 July 1980 (age 46)
- Place of birth: Nyíregyháza, Hungary
- Height: 1.82 m (5 ft 11 1/2 in)
- Position: Defender

Youth career
- 1994–2004: Nyíregyháza

Senior career*
Years	Team	Apps	(Gls)
2004–2013	Nyíregyháza	110	(0)
2009	→ Rákospalota (loan)	9	(0)
2010	→ Nyírmada (loan)		
2011	→ Kemecse SE (loan)	11	(0)
2013–2016	Nyírbátor	91	(2)

Managerial career
- 2018–2020: Nyíregyháza (assistant)
- * Club domestic league appearances and goals

Árpád Ambrusz (born 2 July 1980) is a Hungarian football coach and a former defender.

== Club career ==
Ambrusz began with Nyíregyháza in 2004 as a defender. There he was a prosperous player from his first season. In 2008, he appeared as a loan player at Rákospalotai EAC where he played nine matches. He would next play for the national team.
