= Gergő Cseri =

Hungarian footballer (born 1982)

- Cseri playing for Rákospalota Old Boys in 2026

Personal information
- Full name: Gergő Attila Cseri
- Date of birth: 17 January 1982 (age 44)
- Place of birth: Budapest, Hungary
- Height: 1.86 m (6 ft 1 in)
- Position: Defender

Team information
- Current team: REAC Sportiskola
- Number: 13

Youth career
- –2001: Vasas
- 2001–2002: Újpest

Senior career*
Years	Team	Apps	(Gls)
2002–2003	Újpest-Fót	18	(3)
2003–2004	Újpest	18	(0)
2004–2011	Rákospalota	188	(14)
2016–2018	Novohrad Lučenec		
2018–2019	Jánoshida	30	(1)
2021	Taksony	5	(0)
2021–2023	Bánk-Dalnoki	35	(5)
2023–2025	Športový klub Vinica		
2025–2026	REAC Sportiskola	10	(1)
- * Club domestic league appearances and goals as of 23 May 2026

Gergő Attila Cseri (born 17 January 1982) is a Hungarian professional footballer who most recently played as a defender for Megyei Bajnokság IV club REAC Sportiskola.

== Career ==
=== Újpest ===
On 20 January 2003, Cseri returned to Nemzeti Bajnokság I club Újpest after spending the first half of the season at the club's feeder club Fót.

=== Rákospalota ===
Cseri made his debut for Nemzeti Bajnokság II club Rákospalota on 22 August 2004, and scored the final goal of a 4–0 home win over Orosháza.

On 20 January 2009, it was announced that he extended his contract until summer 2010.

== Career statistics ==
As of match played 23 May 2026

Appearances and goals by club, season and competition
Club	Season	League			Magyar Kupa		Ligakupa		Other		Total	
Club	Season	Division	Apps	Goals	Apps	Goals	Apps	Goals	Apps	Goals	Apps	Goals
Újpest-Fót	2002–03	Nemzeti Bajnokság II	18	3	3	2	—		—		21	5
Újpest	2002–03	Nemzeti Bajnokság I	10	0	—		—		—		10	0
Újpest	2003–04	Nemzeti Bajnokság I	8	0	1	0	—		—		9	0
Újpest	Total		18	0	1	0	—		—		19	0
Rákospalota	2004–05	Nemzeti Bajnokság II	22	3	1	0	—		—		23	3
Rákospalota	2005–06	Nemzeti Bajnokság I	22	1	3	0	—		—		25	1
Rákospalota	2006–07	Nemzeti Bajnokság I	27	1	4	0	—		—		31	1
Rákospalota	2007–08	Nemzeti Bajnokság I	27	0	2	0	8	0	—		37	0
Rákospalota	2008–09	Nemzeti Bajnokság I	23	1	3	0	7	0	—		33	1
Rákospalota	2009–10	Nemzeti Bajnokság II	24	3	2	0	—		—		26	3
Rákospalota	2010–11	Nemzeti Bajnokság II	29	5	3	2	—		—		32	7
Rákospalota	2011–12	Nemzeti Bajnokság II	14	0	2	0	—		—		16	0
Rákospalota	Total		188	14	20	2	15	0	—		223	16
Jánoshida	2017–18	Megyei Bajnokság I	12	0	—		—		—		12	0
Jánoshida	2018–19	Megyei Bajnokság I	18	1	—		—		1 (Note: Appearance in Magyar Kupa qualifying rounds)	0	19	1
Jánoshida	Total		30	1	—		—		1	0	31	1
Taksony	2020–21	Nemzeti Bajnokság III	5	0	—		—		—		5	0
Bánk-Dalnoki	2021–22	Megyei Bajnokság I	24	4	—		—		5 (Note: Three appearances in Nógrád County Cup, two appearances in Megyei Bajnokság I promotion play-offs)	0	29	4
Bánk-Dalnoki	2022–23	Nemzeti Bajnokság III	11	1	—		—		—		11	1
Bánk-Dalnoki	Total		35	5	—		—		5	0	40	5
REAC Sportiskola	2025–26	Megyei Bajnokság IV	10	1	—		—		1 (Note: Appearance in Budapest Kupa)	0	11	1
Career total			304	24	24	4	15	0	7	0	350	28

== Honours ==
Bánk-Dalnoki

- Megyei Bajnokság I – Nógrád: 2021–22
- Nógrád County Cup: 2022
