= Secuieni =

Secuieni may refer to:

- Secuieni, Bacău, a commune in Bacău County, Romania
- Secuieni, Harghita, a commune in Harghita County, Romania
- Secuieni, Neamț, a commune in Neamţ County, Romania
- Roman-Secuieni gas field, Romania

== See also ==
- Székely (disambiguation)
