= Gergő Rása =

Hungarian footballer

Personal information
- Full name: Gergő Rása
- Date of birth: 7 March 1989 (age 37)
- Place of birth: Budapest, Hungary
- Height: 1.82 m (6 ft 0 in)
- Position: Midfielder

Team information
- Current team: Balassagyarmati VSE
- Number: 15

Youth career
- 1999–2001: Ikarus SE
- 2001–2005: MTK Budapest

Senior career*
Years	Team	Apps	(Gls)
2005–2009	MTK Budapest	0	(0)
2006–2007	→ Újpest FC (loan)	0	(0)
2007–2009	→ Rákospalotai EAC (loan)	27	(0)
2009–2011	Videoton	0	(0)
2009–2011	→ Videoton II (loan)	34	(0)
2011–2012	Lombard Pápa	2	(0)
2012–2013	Vác	14	(0)
2013	Balmazújváros	1	(0)
2013–2017	Vác	38	(2)
2018–	Balassagyarmati VSE	?	(?)
- * Club domestic league appearances and goals as of 22 May 2018

Gergő Rása (born 7 March 1989) is a Hungarian professional footballer who plays as a striker for Vác FC.
