= Székely =

Székely may refer to:

- Székelys, Hungarian people from the historical region of Transylvania, Romania
  - Székely Land, historic and ethnographic area in Transylvania, Romania
- Székely (village), a village in northeastern Hungary
- Székely (surname)
- Szekely Aircraft Engine
- György Dózsa, also referred to as György Székely

== See also ==
- Secuieni (disambiguation) (a term linked to the Székelys in Romanian)
