= Levente Szántai =

Hungarian footballer

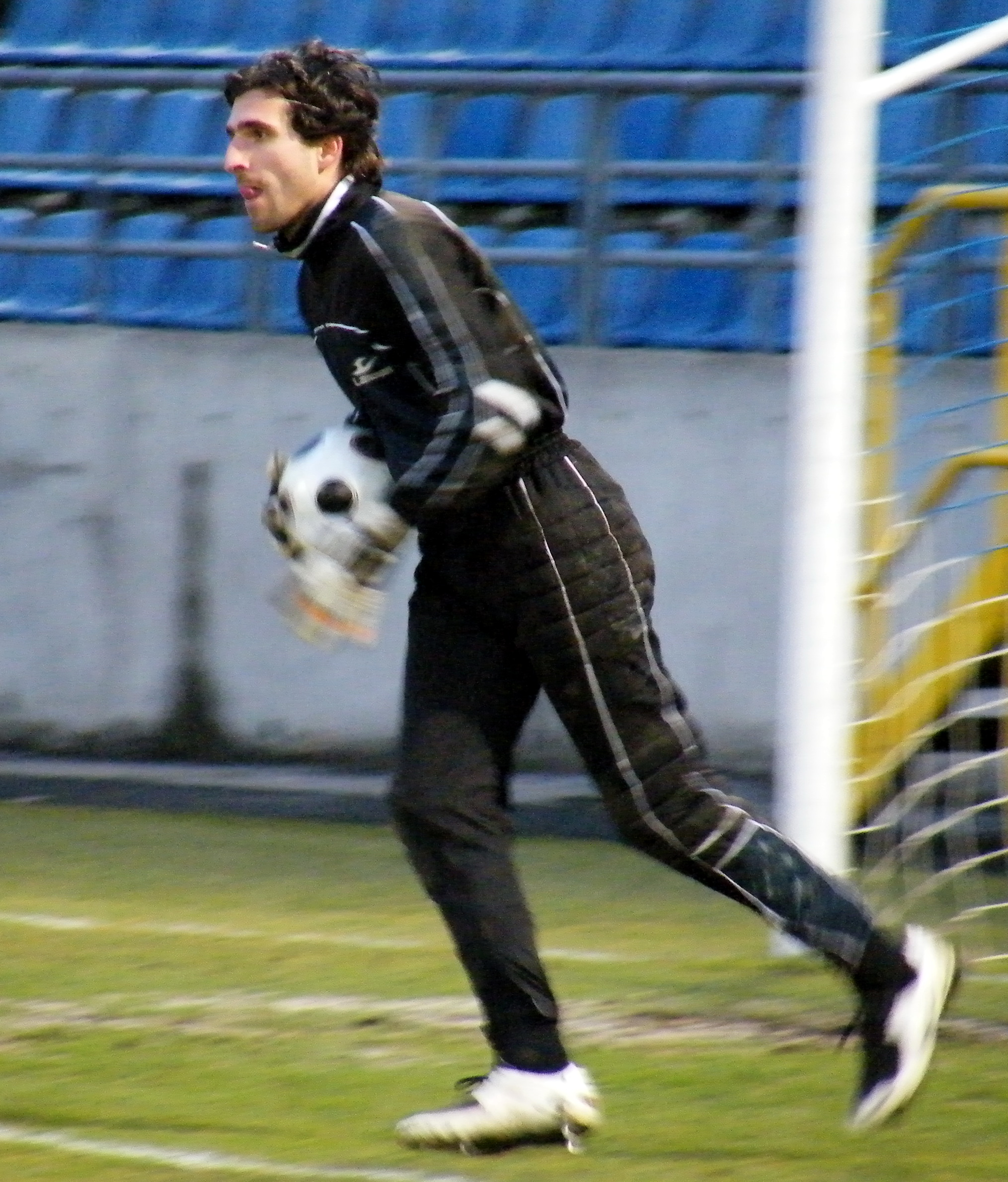
- Szántai in 2009

Personal information
- Full name: Levente Szántai
- Date of birth: 15 November 1982 (age 43)
- Place of birth: Budapest, Hungary
- Height: 1.83 m (6 ft 0 in)
- Position: Goalkeeper

Team information
- Current team: Mezőkövesd
- Number: 1

Youth career
- 1994–1999: Újpest

Senior career*
Years	Team	Apps	(Gls)
1999–2002	Újpest	9	(0)
2002–2006	MTK	5	(0)
2006	→ Kazincbarcika (loan)	14	(0)
2006–2007	→ Diósgyőr (loan)	2	(0)
2007	Soroksár	1	(0)
2007–2009	Rákospalota	42	(0)
2009–2010	MTK	8	(0)
2010–	Mezőkövesd	95	(0)

International career
2002–2003	Hungary U-21	4	(0)
- * Club domestic league appearances and goals as of 18 October 2013

Levente Szántai (born 15 November 1982 in Budapest) is a Hungarian football player who currently plays for Mezőkövesd-Zsóry SE.

== Honours ==
Nemzeti Bajnokság I:
Winner 2003

== Bibliography ==
- European Football Clubs & Squads
- Hivatasos Labdarugok Szervete
