= Tibor Pomper =

Hungarian footballer

Personal information
- Full name: Tibor Pomper
- Date of birth: 10 October 1977 (age 49)
- Place of birth: Budapest, Hungary
- Height: 1.85 m (6 ft 1 in)
- Position: Defender

Team information
- Current team: REAC

Senior career*
Years	Team	Apps	(Gls)
1995–2000	BVSC Budapest	70	(4)
1998	→ Ferencvárosi TC (on loan)	2	(0)
2000–2001	Dunaújváros FC	25	(1)
2001–2003	FC Fehérvár	61	(8)
2003–2004	Rákospalotai EAC	?	(?)
2004–2005	Győri ETO FC	22	(0)
2005–2008	Budapest Honvéd FC	49	(2)
2008–2009	REAC		
- * Club domestic league appearances and goals

Tibor Pomper (born 10 October 1977, in Budapest) is a Hungarian football player who played for REAC until the end of 2009, he left REAC to go to Greece. His Greek plans did not come true, currently he is without team.
