= Zoltán Varga (footballer, born 1983) =

Hungarian footballer

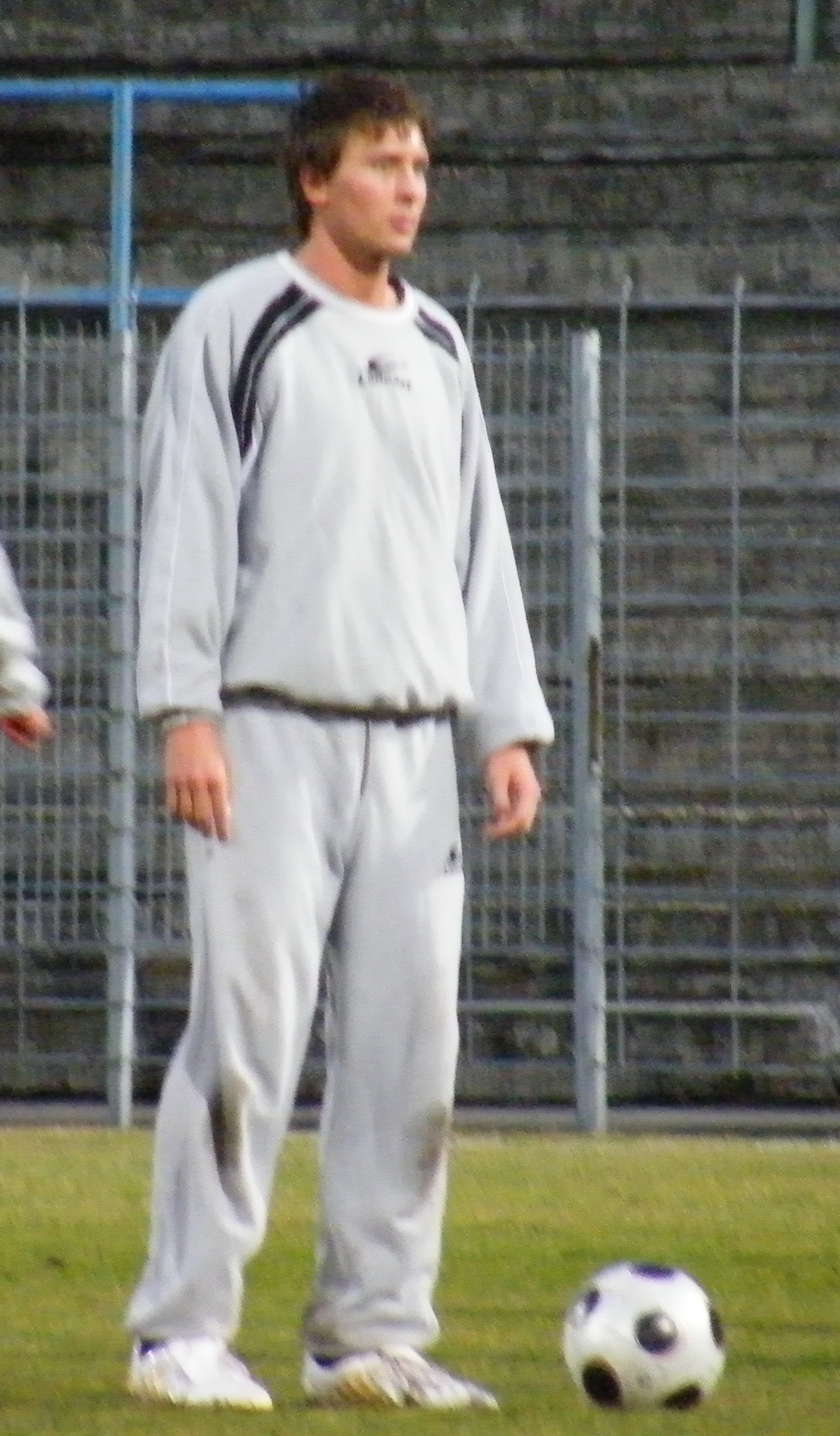

Personal information
- Full name: Zoltán Varga
- Date of birth: 2 March 1983 (age 43)
- Place of birth: Budapest, Hungary
- Height: 1.85 m (6 ft 1 in)
- Position: Midfielder

Team information
- Current team: Rákospalotai EAC
- Number: 9

Senior career*
Years	Team	Apps	(Gls)
2001–2003	Ferencvárosi TC	3	(0)
2003–2006	Győri ETO FC	64	(4)
2006	Kaposvári Rákóczi FC	15	(0)
2007	Pécsi MFC	2	(0)
2007–2008	Rákospalotai EAC	19	(4)
2008	Debreceni VSC	5	(0)
2009–	REAC (loan)		

International career
1996–1997	Hungary U-14	2	(0)
1998–1999	Hungary U-15	5	(1)
1999–2000	Hungary U-16	12	(5)
- * Club domestic league appearances and goals

Zoltán Varga (born 2 March 1983) is a Hungarian football player who currently plays for Rákospalotai EAC.
