= Zoltán Aczél =

Hungarian footballer

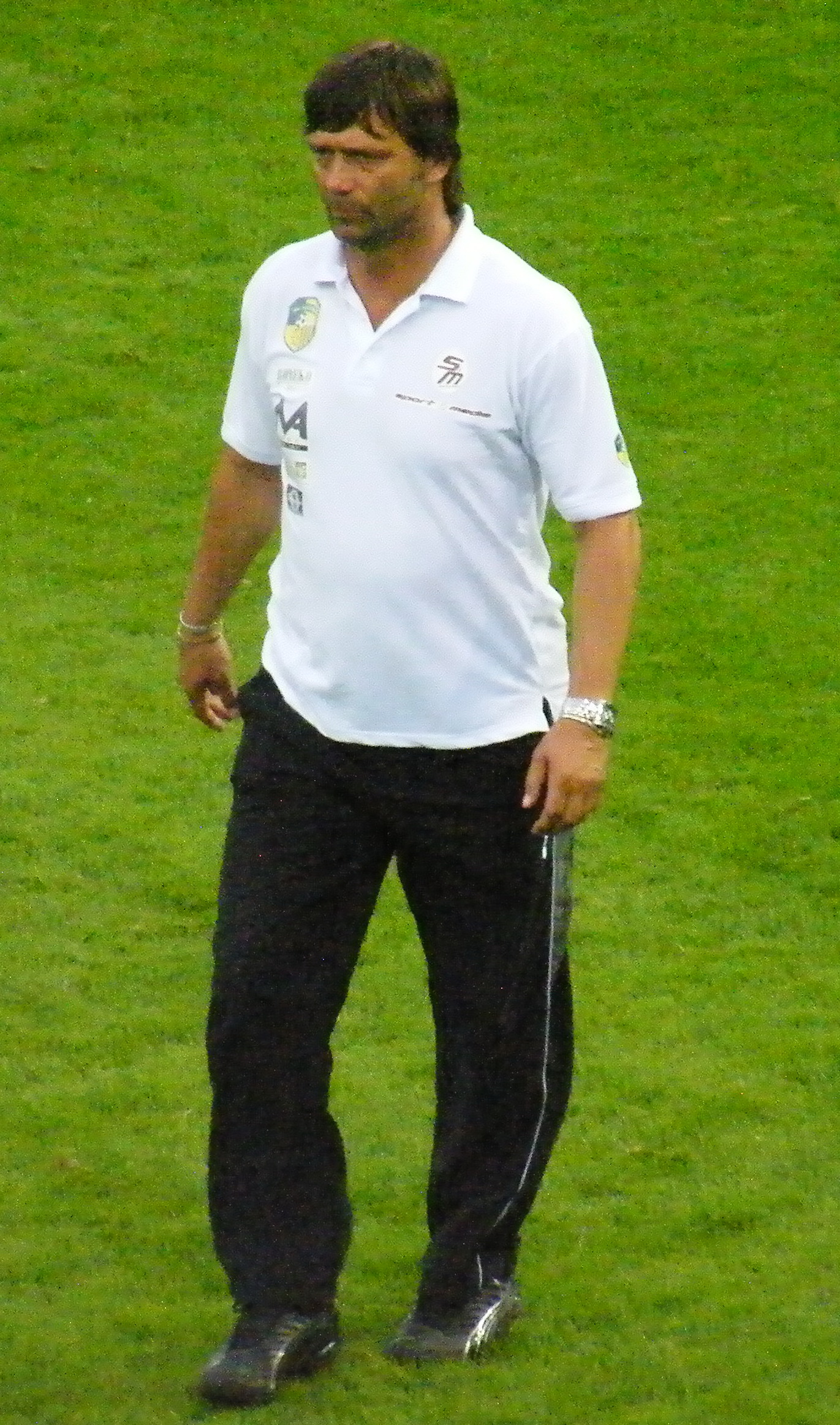

Personal information
- Date of birth: 13 May 1967 (age 59)
- Place of birth: Budapest, Hungary
- Height: 1.88 m (6 ft 2 in)
- Position: Defender

Senior career*
Years	Team	Apps	(Gls)
1987–1988	Újpest	1	(0)
1988–1991	Siófok	61	(1)
1991	Daewoo Royals	6	(0)
1991–1994	Újpest	63	(1)
1994	Lausanne-Sport	11	(1)
1994–1995	Vác	10	(1)
1995–1996	Pécs	8	(1)
1996–1997	SV Ried	8	(0)
1997–1998	TSV Hartberg	0	(0)
1998–1999	Pécs	16	(0)
1999–2000	BVSC	13	(1)
2000	Demecser FC	16	(0)
2000–2002	Dabas	10	(2)

International career
1990	Hungary	2	(0)

Managerial career
- 2000: Demecser FC (player-coach)
- 2000: Dabas
- 2003: Dunakeszi (caretaker)
- 2003–2005: Tura
- 2006: Újpest II
- 2006–2008: Rákospalota
- 2008–2010: Hungary (assistant)
- 2008–2009: Siófok
- 2009: Diósgyőr
- 2010: Szigetszentmiklós
- 2010–2011: Haladás
- 2018–2021: Dabas–Gyón
- 2021–2022: Kozármisleny
- 2022–2024: III. Kerület
- 2024–2025: Pécs
- * Club domestic league appearances and goals

Zoltán Aczél (born 13 May 1967) is a Hungarian football manager and a former player who played as a defender.

== Career ==
His previous clubs include Hungarian football clubs such as Újpest FC, BFC Siófok, Vác-Újbuda LTC, Pécsi Mecsek FC, BVSC Budapest and FC Dabas, and Austrian ones such as SV Ried and TSV Hartberg, and the South Korean club Daewoo Royals.
