= Rákospalotai EAC =

Association football club in Budapest, Hungary

REAC
- Full name: Rákospalotai Egyetértés Atlétikai Club
- Nickname: REAC
- Short name: REAC
- Founded: 1912
- Ground: Budai II. László Stadion, Budapest
- Capacity: 7,500
- Executive Officers: Tamás Forgács; Ferenc Sági
- Manager: Zoltán Molnár
- League: MB I Budapest
- 2025–26: MB I Budapest, 9th of 16
- Website: reac.hu
Home colours	Away colours

Rákospalotai EAC is a Hungarian association football club based in the Rákospalota quarter in the north-east of Budapest, that competes in the Megyei Bajnokság I – Budapest, the fourth tier of Hungarian football. REAC were promoted to the Nemzeti Bajnokság I, the first division in Hungarian football, for the 2005–06 season, but the team was relegated to the Nemzeti Bajnokság II after the 2008–09 season. The club play their home games at Budai II. László Stadion.

== History ==
=== 1912 to 1991: Founding to the end of Volán ===
A team named REAC was founded in the Budapest neighborhood Rákospalota in 1912, but operations ended in the 1940s. Football continued, however, in the neighborhood with the best known teams being Fősped Szállítók and Volán, the latter of which entered the NB I. in 1979. Until 1991, when the club came to an end, Volán had enjoyed six seasons in the top flight, although they never finished higher than 11th and often finished at the very bottom of the table. What remained of the club merged with RAK and on August 8 resurrected the name REAC. Since Volán officially ended prior to the merger the newly reformed REAC didn't take any of its records, nor was it allowed to continue in the NB I. Instead they began play in the BLSZ I.

=== 1992: The fight for the second division ===
By 1992 they had dropped to the NB III Mátra group, and though the goal was clearly to return to the second division they had a tough path to work through, including Monor and former NB I. team Szolnok MÁV. As winter came and the first half of the season came to a close, REAC was in third place, but only a point separated them and Dunakeszi VSE for second. They would finish that spring not only with 41 points, exactly one point ahead of second place Gyöngyös, but with the right to play in the NB II. that coming fall.

=== 1993: The first year in NB II ===
The team was placed in the Eastern division of NB II., which was clearly the more difficult at the time—former NB I. teams Diósgyőr and Nyíregyháza Spartacus were also in the division, as well as several other strong clubs. The team, however, knew it would be more important to defeat the weaker teams in the division—Eger, Szeged, for instance—if it was even going to think about competing with the better teams. Under the guidance of their coach and former Fradi player and József Dálnoki, they won their first match 1–0 against Gödöllő. The good start was short-lived, however, and over the next five matches they would only gain one point in the standings. A 3–0 win over Eger brought hope, but over the next eight matches they didn't notch a single win and only three ties. The team fired Dálnoki, and hired former Hungarian national team player Imre Garaba, who would have to wait five matches before the team's next victory. They ended the season in last place, and prepared to return to NB III.

=== 1994–1995: Back in NB III ===
Relegation hurt the team as many players left (several eventually ended up in NB I) as did Garaba, who left for Gödöllő. He was replaced by Péter Antal, a former Vasas player. They began the 1994–1995 season with two scoreless losses and by the halfway point of the season they were in sixth place. But the team didn't give up hope, winning ten and drawing twice in their next 12 matches and with three matches left the team was in second place. Though they won one against Eger, the team ultimately ended the season in 3rd place.

The team started the 1995–1996 optimistic and with a stronger team than most of the competition. Aside from a surprise home loss against Selypi Kinizsi the team did just that and they ended the first half of the season tied for first with Szolnok MÁV. In a decisive match in the second half of the season, REAC lost to Szolnok and ultimately lost the championship, though they led the league in goals scored with 66.

=== 1996–1998: Return to the second division ===
REAC came back for their third season in the NB III Mátra group with a new coach; the former Volán defender Béla Hegedűs. Though they began the season with four wins, two losses followed, and Hegedűs stepped down, being replaced by László Kiss. Though they played strong throughout the season, they ended the season in 2nd place.

In 1997 the league restructured, and though REAC finished second, they began the 1997–1998 season in the NB II Eastern Group. Their goal was clear from that point; remaining in the second division. Though the club struggled, they finished the year in 8th place and prepared for their second straight season in the NB II.

The team had high hopes coming into 1998. Former coach Kiss returned to the team along with most of the team's key players. Though they started out strong, they completely fell apart and by the season's halfway point they found themselves in 10th place. Their woes continued in the second half of the season, where they only gained four points in the next seven matches. They were able to end things on a winning note, though they still finished the season in tenth place.

=== 2005–present: NB I and relegation ===
2005–2006, the team's first season in the top division was full of hardship, and the team finished in 14th place, just barely outside of the relegation zone. The story was similar in 2006–2007, with only one match left in the season they were among three teams statistically in danger of relegation. They finished the season with a 2–2 draw against Fehérvár, but since Pécs were unable to beat Vác REAC were safe from relegation once again and were allowed to compete in the NB I. for a third straight season. This was made official on May 24, 2007, when the team was among five Hungarian clubs who had their professional licenses renewed by MLSZ. In the 2008/09 season the team could not escape relegation, and went down to the second division for the next season. In 2012, the team was relegated to the third division, NBIII. In 2017, the team was relegated to the fourth division, that is, the Budapest first division championship.

=== Suicide of chairman Róbert Kutasi ===
It was reported on 2 March 2012 that the chairman of the club, Róbert Kutasi, had committed suicide at the age of 48

== Players ==
=== Current squad ===
As of 15 August 2026

Note: Flags indicate national team as defined under FIFA eligibility rules; some limited exceptions apply. Players may hold more than one non-FIFA nationality.

No.	Pos.	Nation	Player
1	—	HUN	Bence Szabó
2	—	HUN	Tibor Paár
5	—	HUN	Botond Nagy
6	—	HUN	Kristóf Szász
7	—	HUN	Attila Vidovics
8	—	HUN	Milán Endrédi
9	—	HUN	Soma Major
12	—	HUN	Levente Kristóf
13	—	HUN	Csanád Hertel

No.	Pos.	Nation	Player
14	—	HUN	Bendegúz Zöld
16	—	HUN	Zsombor Kocsis
18	—	HUN	Roland Varga
21	—	HUN	Milán Vajda
26	—	HUN	Ambrus Zakariás
61	—	HUN	Szilárd Szokoli
69	—	HUN	Csaba Orbán
77	—	HUN	Ádám Pusztai
99	—	HUN	Lajos Bérczes

=== Notable players ===
For a list of notable Rákospalota players in sortable-table format see List of Rákospalotai EAC players.

== Staff ==
As of 15 August 2026

Position	Name
Manager	(Hungary) Zoltán Molnár
Assistant manager	(Hungary) Balázs Dinka
Goalkeeper coach	(Hungary) Attila Gróf
Masseur	(Hungary) Károly Linter

== Honours and achievements ==
=== League ===
- Nemzeti Bajnokság II (level 2)
  - Runners-up (1): 2004–05
- Nemzeti Bajnokság III (level 3)
  - Winners (1): 1992–93
  - Runners-up (2): 1995–96, 1996–97

=== County Leagues (Budapest) (Note: Budapest is not a county, but a municipality that has an identical administrative status to all the other 19 counties.) ===
- Megyei Bajnokság I (level 4)
  - Winners (1): 2017–18
  - Runners-up (1): 2022–23
- Amatőr IV. Osztály / Megyei Bajnokság II (level 5)
  - Winners (1): 1937–38
  - Runners-up (3): 1929–30, 1964, 1966

=== County Cups ===
- Budapest Kupa
  - Winners (1): 2017–18
  - Runners-up (1): 2018–19
