= List of Rákospalotai EAC seasons =

Rákospalotai Egyetértés Atlétikai Club is a Hungarian association football club based in Rákospalota, Budapest.

== Key ==
- NB I = Nemzeti Bajnokság I
- NB II = Nemzeti Bajnokság II
- NB III = Nemzeti Bajnokság III
- MB I = Megyei Bajnokság I
- MB II = Megyei Bajnokság II
- Pld = Matches played
- W = Matches won
- D = Matches drawn
- L = Matches lost
- GF = Goals for
- GA = Goals against
- Pts = Points
- Pos = Final position
- Canc = Cancelled
- QR1 = First qualifying round
- QR2 = Second qualifying round
- QR3 = Third qualifying round
- R64 = Round of 64
- R32 = Round of 32
- R16 = Round of 16
- R1 = Round 1
- R2 = Round 2
- R3 = Round 3
- R4 = Round 4
- R5 = Round 5
- Grp = Group stage
- QF = Quarter-finals
- SF = Semi-finals

Winners	Runners-up	Play-offs*	Promoted ↑	Relegated ↓

== Seasons ==
Seasons of Rákospalotai EAC
Season	League									Magyar Kupa	Other	
Season	Division	Pld	W	D	L	GF	GA	Pts	Pos	Magyar Kupa	Competition	Result
1919–20	NB III	26	9	10	7	29	26	28	6th	—	—	—
1920–21	NB III ↓	20	8	6	6	43	27	22	4th	—	—	—
1921–22	MB I ↑	32	23	2	7	80	28	48	5th	—	—	—
1922–23	NB III	28	14	5	9	42	26	33	6th	—	—	—
1923–24	NB III	28	17	4	7	54	32	38	4th	—	—	—
1924–25	NB III ↑	26	12	5	9	43	37	29	3rd	—	—	—
1925–26	NB II	26	6	7	13	45	65	19	11th	—	—	—
1926–27	NB II ↓	30	8	2	20	35	67	18	14th	R16	—	—
1927–28	NB III ↓	32	3	2	27	29	87	8	16th	R5	—	—
1928–29	MB I ↓	30	10	2	18	34	90	22	13th	—	—	—
1929–30	MB II	20	15	2	3	76	32	32	2nd* (Note: 2nd placed teams in the other 4 groups in MB II played with each other to decide the fate of fifth place which could mean promotion. None of the team advanced to the next tier, Rákospalota finished 6th overall.)	QR2	—	—
1930–31	MB II	26	14	7	5	83	46	35	4th	Canc (Note: Rákospalota were cancelled from the qualification phase.)	—	—
1931–32	MB II	20	9	1	10	31	47	19	7th	—	—	—
1932–33	MB II	16	9	0	7	38	36	18	5th	—	—	—
1933–34	MB II	24	13	2	9	57	39	28	4th	—	—	—
1934–35	MB II	19	12	2	5	53	28	26	3rd	—	—	—
1935–36	MB II	21* (Note: Without result against Pestújhely II away.)	10	4	7	45	42	24	5th	—	—	—
1936–37	MB II	24	15	3	6	84	39	33	3rd	—	—	—
1937–38	MB II	26	21	2	3	86	41	44	1st* (Note: The final of the 4 groups was played between Pesterzsébeti Juta, ESMTK II and Gázgyár along with Rákospalota. The team finished in 2nd place, remaining in the MB II next season.)	—	—	—
1938–39	MB II ↑	26	8	8	10	59	71	24	8th	—	—	—
1939–40	MB I	24	14	4	6	69	43	33	4th	—	—	—
1940–41	MB I	24	6	6	12	46	76	18	12th	R32	—	—
1941–42	MB I	24	5	8	11	47	67	18	11th	R1	—	—
1942–43	MB I	26	10	5	11	64	51	25	9th	R3	—	—
1943–44	MB I ↑↑	26	12	6	8	68	45	30	4th	QR1	—	—
1945	NB II	22	11	4	7	80	65	26	5th	—	—	—
1945–46 (Note: Partial results.)	NB II ↓	23	8	4	11	59	63	20	9th	—	—	—
1946–47	NB III	28	13	4	11	57	50	30	7th	—	—	—
1947–48	NB III	30	10	6	14	49	71	26	9th	—	—	—
1948–49	NB III ↓	30	6	4	20	38	95	16	16th	—	—	—
1949–50	MB I	30	12	3	15	50	84	27	11th	—	—	—
1950	MB I	15	8	3	4	40	32	19	6th	—	—	—
1950–55	Did not participate in any competitions until 1955.											
1955	MB I	30	4	5	21	40	76	13	15th	—	—	—
1955–57	Did not participate in any competitions until 1957.											
1957–58	MB I	38	15	7	16	57	70	37	12th	—	—	—
1958–59	MB I	30	7	5	18	38	62	19	14th	—	—	—
1959–60	MB I	30	6	8	16	30	60	20	14th	—	—	—
1960–61	MB I	30	8	10	12	35	42	24 (Note: 2 point deduction.)	10th	—	—	—
1961–62	MB I	30	16	9	5	66	42	41	3rd	—	—	—
1962–63	MB I ↓	30	14	10	6	57	36	38	3rd	—	—	—
1963	MB II	15	4	4	7	23	32	12	12th	—	—	—
1964	MB II	30	19	9	2	70	31	47	2nd	—	—	—
1965	MB II	26	13	5	8	54	40	31	7th	—	—	—
1966	MB II ↑	26	13	8	5	54	32	34	2nd	—	—	—
1967	MB I	30	14	7	9	58	48	35	5th	—	—	—
1967–91	Did not participate in any competitions until 1991, when it received Ganz Danubius's place in the Budapest MB I. In the second half of the season, it competed in NB II, following the official announcement that Ganz Danubius would henceforth compete under the name REAC.											
1991–92	MB I ↑↑	15	4	5	6	24	20	13	10th	—	—	—
1991–92	NB II ↓	30	6	8	16	28	53	20	15th	—	—	—
1992–93	NB III ↑	30	18	5	7	58	29	41	1st	—	—	—
1993–94	NB II ↓	30	7	7	16	33	52	19 (Note: 2 point deduction due to an irregular transfer.)	16th	R64	—	—
1994–95	NB III	30	18	5	7	66	29	56	3rd	—	—	—
1995–96	NB III	30	21	7	2	66	17	70	2nd	—	—	—
1996–97	NB III	30	20	4	6	63	26	64	2nd	Grp	—	—
1997–98	NB III	30	11	10	9	36	40	43	8th	—	—	—
1998–99	NB III	26	7	6	13	28	36	27	10th	—	—	—
Rákospalota was granted the right to play in NB II during the winter break of the 1999–2000 season by Pécs after they replaced bankrupt Gázszer in NB I.
1999–2000	NB III ↑	15	4	3	8	29	27	15	12th	Grp	—	—
1999–2000	NB II	38	11	3	24	42	79	36	16th	Grp	—	—
2000–01	NB II	22	6	4	12	23	43	22	10th	—	—	—
2001–02	NB II	32	13	8	11	53	40	47	5th	R16	—	—
2002–03	NB II	34	18	6	10	60	44	60	4th	R2	—	—
2003–04	NB II	34	14	10	10	46	38	52	6th* (Note: Rákospalota was defeated in the 2004 Nemzeti Bajnokság I relegation play-off by Békéscsaba, 3–1 on aggregate.)	R1	—	—
2004–05	NB II ↑	26	15	8	3	42	18	53	2nd	R2	—	—
2005–06	NB I	30	7	5	18	30	59	26	14th	R16	—	—
2006–07	NB I	30	9	7	14	42	55	34	14th	R16	—	—
2007–08	NB I	30	7	9	14	42	60	30	12th	R32	Ligakupa	QF (Note: Autumn season of Ligakupa.); QF (Note: Spring season of Ligakupa.)
2008–09	NB I ↓	30	3	6	21	33	73	15	16th	R16	Ligakupa	Grp
2009–10	NB II	28	15	5	8	76	36	50	4th	R32	—	—
2010–11	NB II	30	9	6	15	30	38	33	10th	R32	—	—
2011–12	NB II ↓	30	8	7	15	44	61	31	15th	R3	—	—
2012–13	NB III	26	17	3	6	57	25	54	3rd* (Note: Rákospalota retained its membership in NB III in the 2013 Nemzeti Bajnokság III relegation play-off by defeating Berkenye SE, 7–3 on aggregate.)	R32	—	—
2013–14	NB III	30	7	12	11	39	49	33	12th	—	—	—
2014–15	NB III	30	14	9	7	55	45	51	3rd	R64	—	—
2015–16	NB III	32	6	6	20	36	73	24	16th	R1	—	—
2016–17	NB III ↓	34	11	7	16	42	55	40	15th	R32	—	—
2017–18	MB I	30	26	3	1	107	17	81	1st* (Note: Rákospalota was defeated in the 2018 Megyei Bajnokság I promotion play-off by Sárvár, 1–0 on aggregate.)	QR1	Budapest Kupa	W
2018–19	MB I	30	21	7	2	83	9	70	3rd	QR1	Budapest Kupa	RU
2019–20	MB I (Note: Suspended due to COVID-19 pandemic in Hungary.)	18	9	4	5	36	23	31	7th	QR3	Budapest Kupa	R16
2020–21	MB I	30	18	9	3	71	31	63	3rd	QR2	Budapest Kupa	R16
2021–22	MB I	30	20	4	6	75	31	64	4th	—	Budapest Kupa	SF
2022–23	MB I ↑	30	23	2	5	77	29	71	2nd* (Note: Only the 1st placed team could play in the promotion play-off, however Unione FC refused to participate in it. The opportunity has passed to second-placed Rákospalota, where they defeated Kállósemjén SE 10–3 on aggregate in the 2023 Megyei Bajnokság I promotion play-off, thereby earning promotion to the Nemzeti Bajnokság III.)	R2	Budapest Kupa	R32
2023–24	NB III ↓	30	7	3	20	34	69	24	15th	—	—	—
2024–25	MB I	30	15	5	10	62	39	50	6th	R1	Budapest Kupa	SF
2025–26	MB I	30	11	6	13	51	52	39	9th	R64	Budapest Kupa	R16
Season	Division	Pld	W	D	L	GF	GA	Pts	Pos	Magyar Kupa	Competition	Result
Season	League									Magyar Kupa	Other	
