= 2013–14 Rákospalotai EAC season =

Rákospalota
2013–14 season
- Owner: József Forgács
- Chief executives: Tamás Forgács; Ferenc Sági
- Manager: János Mátyus
- Stadium: Budai II. László Stadion
- Nemzeti Bajnokság III (East): 12th
- Top goalscorer: League: Viktor Lucz (5); All: Viktor Lucz (5)
Home colours

The 2013–14 season was Rákospalotai Egyetértés Atlétikai Club's or shortly REAC's 67th competitive season, 2nd consecutive season in the Nemzeti Bajnokság III and 101st year in existence as a football club. They did not participate in this year's domestic cup, as they did not qualify for it the previous season.

József Forgács' son, Tamás Forgács, and Ferenc Sági are jointly responsible for the management of the club in the future. József Forgács, the owner who keeps the club alive, remains president, but takes a back seat and is no longer involved in day-to-day affairs.

== Friendlies ==
After the friendly match with Vietnam U-23 national team in Hungary, the Vietnam Football Federation invited the club to an international tournament in Vietnam. 10 players travelled from the first team squad and 8 more from the Youth team. The team was away from 22 October to 5 November, during which time two league matches against Jászapáti and Tiszaújváros were postponed. They played against the best of the South Korean reserve league, Dong Tam Long An and Becamex Binh Duong, the latter game was attended by 20,000 spectators.

1	Becamex Binh Duong (Vietnam)	4–0	(Hungary) Rákospalota	Vietnam

2	R League All-Stars (South Korea)	5–0	(Hungary) Rákospalota	Vietnam

3	Dong Tam Long An (Vietnam)	2–0	(Hungary) Rákospalota	Vietnam

== First team squad ==
The players listed had league appearances and stayed until the end of the season.

Note: Flags indicate national team as defined under FIFA eligibility rules; some limited exceptions apply. Players may hold more than one non-FIFA nationality.

No.	Pos.	Nation	Player
1	GK	(Ukraine) UKR	Vladyslav Chanhelia
2	DF	(Hungary) HUN	Balázs Dinka (captain)
3	DF	(Hungary) HUN	Attila Honti
4	N/A	(Hungary) HUN	Márk Aranyás
4	FW	(Hungary) HUN	Dániel Lukács
6	FW	(Hungary) HUN	Tamás Herbály
7	FW	(Hungary) HUN	Patrik Czimmermann
7	N/A	(Hungary) HUN	Ferenc Porkoláb
8	MF	(Hungary) HUN	Dávid Szekér
9	MF	(Hungary) HUN	Dániel Kovács
9	MF	(Hungary) HUN	Nabil Switzer
10	MF	(Hungary) HUN	Tamás Kiss
11	FW	(Hungary) HUN	János Olasz

No.	Pos.	Nation	Player
11	N/A	(Hungary) HUN	Richárd Vizi
12	N/A	(Hungary) HUN	Bence Csiszár
12	N/A	(Hungary) HUN	Tamás Grót
12	MF	(Hungary) HUN	Zsolt Pálmai
12	MF	(Hungary) HUN	Erik Pfister
13	DF	(Hungary) HUN	János Birtalan
14	FW	(Hungary) HUN	Kristóf Csete
14	DF	(Hungary) HUN	László Emperger
14	DF	(Hungary) HUN	Zsolt Kollár
15	DF	(Hungary) HUN	Dávid Radványi
16	MF	(Hungary) HUN	Ákos Füle
18	MF	(Hungary) HUN	Viktor Lucz

== Transfers ==
=== Transfers in ===
Date	Pos.	No.	Player	From	Ref
26 July 2013	FW	9	(Hungary) Péter Simek	Free agent (Note: Previous club: Vasas.)	
13 August 2013	GK	20	(Hungary) Csaba Dániel	Veszprém	
13 August 2013	FW	10	(Hungary) János Farkas	Mezőkövesd	
13 August 2013	MF	12	(Hungary) Károly Kiss	Soroksár	
13 August 2013	MF	10	(Hungary) Tamás Kiss	Siófok	
13 August 2013	MF	8	(Hungary) Dávid Szekér	Tatabánya	
13 August 2013	FW	14	(Hungary) Richárd Wágner	Diósd	
15 August 2013	DF	15	(Hungary) Gábor Horváth	Nagykőrös	
21 February 2014	GK	1	(Ukraine) Vladyslav Chanhelia	Ebes	
24 February 2014	FW	11	(Hungary) János Olasz	Felsőtárkány	
24 February 2014	DF	15	(Hungary) Dávid Radványi	Free agent (Note: Previous club: Békéscsaba.)	
25 February 2014	DF	13	(Hungary) János Birtalan	Ferencváros	
25 February 2014	FW	6	(Hungary) Tamás Herbály	Újpest	

=== Transfers out ===
Date	Pos.	No.	Player	To	Ref
1 July 2013	FW	15	(Hungary) Máté Fézler	Diósgyőr	
9 July 2013	DF	5	(Hungary) Tamás Mihályi	(Austria) 1. FC Leonhofen	
3 July 2013	GK	23	(Hungary) Bence Steer	Pécs	
26 July 2013	DF	15	(Hungary) Ádám Lénárd	Testvériség	
30 July 2013	FW	9	(Hungary) János Olasz	Felsőtárkány	
1 August 2013		15	(Hungary) Miklós Kovacsics	Buday Sportiskola LKE	
1 August 2013	FW	10	(Hungary) László Szűcs	III. Kerület	
2 August 2013	MF	13	(Hungary) Norbert Iflinger	Pénzügyőr	
6 August 2013	FW	20	(Ukraine) Igor Nichenko	Kapuvár	
15 August 2013	MF	32	(Hungary) Patrik Vezsenyi	Testvériség	
22 August 2013	DF	4	(Hungary) Viktor Buzás	Zalaegerszeg	
1 October 2013	FW	15	(Hungary) Péter Belényesi	Karád SC	
1 January 2014	MF	25	(Hungary) Balázs Olay	Veresegyház	
23 January 2014	FW	7	(Hungary) László Bojtor	(Austria) UFC Pamhagen	
31 January 2014	DF	11	(Hungary) Dávid Debreceni	(Austria) FC Deutschkreutz	
4 February 2014	GK	20	(Hungary) Csaba Dániel	Dunaújváros	
20 February 2014	MF	26	(Hungary) Olivér Frideczky	Veresegyház	
20 February 2014	MF	12	(Hungary) Károly Kiss	Jászapáti	
20 February 2014	FW	9	(Hungary) Péter Simek	Bakonycsernye	
21 February 2014	GK	12	(Hungary) Mátyás Esterházy	Hidegkúti SC	
21 February 2014	DF	15	(Hungary) Gábor Horváth	Berkenye	
21 February 2014		14	(Hungary) Bence Kator	Kisnémedi MSE	
25 February 2014	FW	5	(Hungary) Richárd Csiszár	Vecsés	
3 March 2014	FW	10	(Hungary) János Farkas	Jászberény	

=== Loans in ===
Start date	End date	Pos.	No.	Player	From	Ref
14 August 2013	21 February 2014	GK	23	(Hungary) Patrik Almási	MTK	

=== Loans out ===
Start date	End date	Pos.	No.	Player	To	Ref
13 August 2013	31 December 2013	GK	1	(Hungary) Dominik Csurgai	Veresegyház	
13 August 2013	31 December 2013	MF	25	(Hungary) Balázs Olay	Veresegyház	

== Competitions ==
=== Overview ===
Competition	First match	Last match	Starting round	Final position	Record							
Competition	First match	Last match	Starting round	Final position	Pld	W	D	L	GF	GA	GD	Win %
Nemzeti Bajnokság III	17 August 2013	1 June 2014	Matchday 1	12th	30	7	12	11	39	49	−10	23.33
Total					30	7	12	11	39	49	−10	23.33

Source: Competitions

=== Nemzeti Bajnokság III ===
==== League table ====
Pos	Team	Pld	W	D	L	GF	GA	GD	Pts	Promotion or relegation
10	Hajdúböszörmény	30	9	11	10	45	49	−4	38	
11	Jászapáti (Note: Jászapáti did not submit an entry for NB III.) (R)	30	10	5	15	38	61	−23	35	Relegation to Megyei Bajnokság I
12	Rákospalota	30	7	12	11	39	49	−10	33	
13	Ferencváros II (R)	30	7	7	16	47	47	0	28	Relegation and not competed in any division next season
14	Veresegyház (Note: Veresegyház remained in NB III due to withdrawals.)	30	4	9	17	33	73	−40	21	

Source: HFF
Rules for classification: 1) Points; 2) Matches won; 3) Goal difference; 4) Goals scored; 5) Head-to-head points; 6) Head-to-head goal difference; 7) Head-to-head away goals scored; 8) Fair play ranking; 9) Drawing of lots.
(R) Relegated

==== Results summary ====
Overall								Home						Away					
Pld	W	D	L	GF	GA	GD	Pts	W	D	L	GF	GA	GD	W	D	L	GF	GA	GD
30	7	12	11	39	49	−10	33	4	7	4	20	20	0	3	5	7	19	29	−10

Source: HFF

==== Results by round ====
Round	1	2	3	4	5	6	7	8	9	10	11	12	13	14	15	16	17	18	19	20	21	22	23	24	25	26	27	28	29	30
Ground	A	H	A	H	A	A	H	A	H	A	H	A	H	A	H	H	A	H	A	H	H	A	H	A	H	A	H	A	H	A
Result	L	W	L	D	L	L	L	D	D	D	L	L	W	W	D	L	D	D	L	W	W	L	D	D	D	D	D	W	L	W
Position	15	10	13	12	14	14	14	14	14	14	14	14	14	14	13	14	14	14	14	13	12	12	11	13	13	12	12	12	12	12
Points	0	3	3	4	4	4	4	5	6	7	7	7	10	13	14	14	15	16	16	19	22	22	23	24	25	26	27	30	30	33

Source: Matches
A = Away; H = Home; W = Win; D = Draw; L = Loss

==== Matches ====
17 August 2013 1	Létavértes	6–1	Rákospalota	Létavértes
17:00 CEST (UTC+2)	A. Honti 2' (o.g.); Berdó 18'; Kertész 44', 84'; Kinyik 61'; Vinicius (yellow card) 67'; D. Debreceni 80' (o.g.)	Report	K. Kiss (yellow card) 42'; Z. Kollár 67'; P. Czimmermann (yellow card) 83'	Stadium: Létavértesi Sportcentrum; Attendance: 300; Referee: László Lovas

24 August 2013 2	Rákospalota	4–0	Nyírbátor	Budapest
19:00 CEST (UTC+2)	T. Kiss (yellow card) 32'; Bojtor 45', 87'; D. Szekér (yellow card) 52', (goal) 77'; K. Kiss 88'	Report	M. Lipcsei (yellow card) 29'; G. Ráti (yellow card) 84'	Stadium: Budai II. László Stadion; Attendance: 200; Referee: Tamás Móri

31 August 2013 3	Hatvan	3–0	Rákospalota	Hatvan
17:30 CEST (UTC+2)	R. Franyó 18'; R. Ficsor 41'; M. Simon 52'	Report	D. Szekér (yellow card) 56'; N. Switzer (yellow card) 80'	Stadium: Népkert Sporttelep; Referee: Sándor Szilágyi

7 September 2013 4	Rákospalota	1–1	Cigánd	Budapest
18:00 CEST (UTC+2)	Z. Kollár (yellow card) 22'; Dinka (yellow card) 44'; Farkas 66'; V. Lucz (yellow card) 83'; D. Debreceni (red card) 89'	Report	I. Tempfli (yellow card) 11'; P. Monyók 26'; Ur (yellow card) 45'; J. Ondó (yellow card) 88'	Stadium: Budai II. László Stadion; Referee: Péter Hofbauer

14 September 2013 5	Hajdúböszörmény	3–2	Rákospalota	Hajdúböszörmény
16:30 CEST (UTC+2)	M. Milovac 13', (yellow card) 68'; Bogdanović 33'; G. Vasas (red card) 42'; Z. Nagy (yellow card) 56'; B. Buka (yellow card) 60'; Á. Sigér 83'; P. Holecz (yellow card) 88'	Report	Farkas 56'; P. Czimmermann (yellow card) 64'; Z. Kollár (yellow card) 68'; Bojtor 77'	Stadium: Városi Sport- és Rendezvényközpont; Referee: Sándor Czékus

21 September 2013 6	Eger	3–0	Rákospalota	Eger
16:00 CEST (UTC+2)	B. Milovanovic (yellow card) 39', (goal) 69'; G. Ablonczy 54'; P. Palcu 58'	Report	A. Honti (yellow card) 36'; Á. Füle (yellow card) 56'; P. Czimmermann (yellow card) 66'	Stadium: Szentmarjay Tibor Városi Stadion; Attendance: 49; Referee: Ákos Telek

28 September 2013 7	Rákospalota	1–2	Kazincbarcika	Budapest
18:00 CEST (UTC+2)	D. Szekér (yellow card) 30'; Farkas 59'; D. Debreceni (yellow card) 63'; T. Kiss (yellow card) 65'; A. Honti (yellow card) 90+2'	Report	D. Nyitrai 32'; Szabó 47'; P. Nagy (yellow card) 52'; M. Czető (yellow card) 72'; R. Illés (yellow card) 89'	Stadium: Budai II. László Stadion; Referee: Sándor Szilágyi

6 October 2013 8	Ferencváros II	1–1	Rákospalota	Budapest
13:00 CEST (UTC+2)	D. Pintér (yellow card) 30'; P. Popgeorgiev 70'; M. Girán (yellow card) 88'	Report	D. Debreceni 30', (red card) 56'; T. Kiss (yellow card) 34'; A. Honti (red card) 90+1'	Stadium: Béke téri Stadion; Referee: Miklós Bereczki

12 October 2013 9	Rákospalota	0–0	Debrecen II	Budapest
18:00 CEST (UTC+2)	Z. Kollár (yellow card) 65'	Report		Stadium: Budai II. László Stadion; Referee: Tibor Horváth

20 October 2013 10	Veresegyház	1–1	Rákospalota	Veresegyház
14:30 CEST (UTC+2)	D. Nagy (yellow card) 10'; R. Nagy 13', (yellow card) 72'; D. Kozma (yellow card) 14'; B. Oroszi (yellow card) 24'; A. Foró (yellow card) 27'	Report	V. Lucz 29', (yellow card) 50'; Á. Füle (yellow card) 60'	Stadium: Veresegyházi Sporttelep; Referee: József Ducsai

9 November 2013 13	Rákospalota	3–2	Ebes	Budapest
17:00 CET (UTC+1)	V. Lucz 30', 72'; D. Szekér (yellow card) 52'; T. Kiss 54'	Report	Brnović 15'; D. Hadházi (yellow card) 67'; L. Tóth 81'	Stadium: Budai II. László Stadion; Referee: Mátyás Farkas

12 November 2013 12	Tiszaújváros	1–0	Rákospalota	Tiszaújváros
13:30 CET (UTC+1)	P. Fodor (yellow card) 60'; C Nagy (yellow card) 68'; D. Bussy (yellow card) 86'; F. Molnár (red card) 90'	Report	P. Czimmermann (yellow card) 66'; V. Lucz (yellow card) 76'; Á. Füle (yellow card) 77'	Stadium: Tiszaújváros Sportcentrum; Referee: Sándor Szilágyi
Note: The match was postponed due to the tour of Vietnam of REAC.

16 November 2013 14	Felsőtárkány	2–3	Rákospalota	Felsőtárkány
13:00 CET (UTC+1)	Á. Laurinyecz 54'; D. Balogh 57'	Report	V. Lucz 9'; A. Honti (yellow card) 21'; Farkas 31', (yellow card) 60'; Z. Kollár 70'	Stadium: Felsőtárkány SC Sporttelep; Attendance: 400; Referee: Ákos Telek

23 November 2013 15	Rákospalota	1–1	Putnok	Budapest
17:00 CET (UTC+1)	D. Debreceni (yellow card) 51'; D. Szekér (yellow card) 78'; N. Switzer 85'; Farkas (yellow card) 88'	Report	A. Szeleczki (yellow card) 14'; Á. Zimányi (yellow card) 28'; F. Serban (yellow card) 47'; A. Bene (red card) 48'; B. Horváth (yellow card) 69'; S. Tóth 80'; A. Tóth (yellow card) 90'; A. Burdun (yellow card) 90+3'	Stadium: Budai II. László Stadion; Referee: Dr Géza Jakab

27 November 2013 11	Rákospalota	0–2	Jászapáti	Budapest
17:00 CET (UTC+1)	Á. Füle (red card) 69'; Dinka (yellow card) 75'; Z. Kollár (yellow card) 83'	Report	M. Ulvicki 6', 34'; Török (yellow card) 56'; D. Karácsony (red card) 72'; J. Kovács (yellow card) 85'	Stadium: Budai II. László Stadion; Attendance: 200; Referee: Árpád Jakab
Note: The match were originally scheduled for 26 October 2013, but was postponed due to the tour of Vietnam of REAC.

30 November 2013 16	Rákospalota	1–6	Létavértes	Budapest
17:00 CET (UTC+1)	Farkas (yellow card) 33'; T. Kiss (yellow card) 33'; Z. Kollár (yellow card) 72'; A. Honti 76'	Report	Berdó (yellow card) 28'; Á. Suskó 29'; M. Orosz (yellow card) 44'; Kinyik (yellow card) 48'; Vinicius 53', 77', 90'; A. Burics (yellow card) 72'; Kertész (yellow card) 78', (goal) 82'; Bereczki 90+2'	Stadium: Budai II. László Stadion; Referee: Tamás Takács

1 March 2014 17	Nyírbátor	1–1	Rákospalota	Nyírbátor
14:30 CET (UTC+1)	K. Szilágyi (yellow card) 13'; J. Csáki (yellow card) 45'; Z. Erdei 77' (pen.); N. Szilágyi (yellow card) 80'	Report	D. Szekér (yellow card) 21'; Á. Füle (yellow card) 45'; A. Honti (yellow card) 49'; T. Kiss 70' (pen.); V. Lucz (yellow card) 75'	Stadium: Nyírbátori LSE Sporttelep; Attendance: 250; Referee: József Ducsai

8 March 2014 18	Rákospalota	1–1	Hatvan	Budapest
18:00 CET (UTC+1)	A. Honti (yellow card) 20'; T. Kiss (yellow card) 30'; Z. Kollár (yellow card) 33'; J. Olasz 73', (yellow card) 90'	Report	I. Bodnár 56'; B. Juhász (yellow card) 63'; P. Kelemen (yellow card) 81'	Stadium: Budai II. László Stadion; Referee: Bálint Dolnegó

16 March 2014 19	Cigánd	2–1	Rákospalota	Cigánd
15:00 CET (UTC+1)	A. Ludescher (yellow card) 2'; Baksa (yellow card) 63'; Roszel 71'; D. Hadházi 75'; N. Bákonyi (yellow card) 87'	Report	Z. Kollár 54'; P. Czimmermann (yellow card) 56'; J. Olasz (yellow card) 90+2'	Stadium: Városi Stadion; Referee: Sándor Szilágyi

22 March 2014 20	Rákospalota	1–0	Hajdúböszörmény	Budapest
18:00 CET (UTC+1)	D. Szekér (yellow card) 38'; V. Lucz (yellow card) 51'; Z. Kollár (red card) 56'; J. Olasz (yellow card) 75'; Radványi 76', (yellow card) 80'	Report	P. Holecz (yellow card) 48'; M. Lovas (yellow card) 79'	Stadium: Budai II. László Stadion; Referee: Mátyás Farkas

29 March 2014 21	Rákospalota	3–0; Awarded	Eger	Budapest
		Report		Stadium: Budai II. László Stadion
Note: The match was awarded to REAC due to the exclution of Eger.

5 April 2014 22	Kazincbarcika	2–0	Rákospalota	Kazincbarcika
16:30 CEST (UTC+2)	M. Czető (yellow card) 33'; Menyhért 49'; Molnár (yellow card) 65', (goal) 80'	Report	P. Czimmermann (yellow card) 20'; J. Birtalan (yellow card) 34'; T. Grót (yellow card) 38'; T. Kiss (yellow card) 43'	Stadium: Pete András Stadion; Referee: Sándor Szilágyi

12 April 2014 23	Rákospalota	1–1	Ferencváros II	Budapest
18:00 CEST (UTC+2)	Radványi (yellow card) 12'; D. Szekér (yellow card) 47'; J. Olasz (yellow card) 58', (goal) 77'; Á. Füle (yellow card) 79'; Z. Kollár (red card) 86'; V. Chanhelia (yellow card) 90+2'	Report	Csilus (yellow card) 72'; D. Nagy 88'	Stadium: Budai II. László Stadion; Referee: Árpád Jakab

19 April 2014 24	Debrecen II	3–3	Rákospalota	Debrecen
17:00 CEST (UTC+2)	Szatmári (yellow card) 42'; V. Király 45'; B. Györky (yellow card) 59'; P. Karacs (yellow card) 62'; T. Molnár 67', 70'	Report	A. Honti (yellow card) 27'; L. Emperger (yellow card) 33'; D. Szekér 43', (yellow card) 45'; V. Lucz 63'; P. Czimmermann 84'; T. Kiss (yellow card) 84'; R. Csiszár (yellow card) 90'; J. Olasz (yellow card) 90+1'	Stadium: Debreceni Labdarúgó Akadémia Edzőközpont; Attendance: 300; Referee: Dr Bence Csonka

26 April 2014 25	Rákospalota	2–2	Veresegyház	Budapest
18:00 CEST (UTC+2)	D. Szekér (red card) 45'; P. Czimmermann (yellow card) 46'; Radványi 67', (red card) 90+3'; R. Csiszár 88'	Report	L. Takács 2'; B. Deák 9', (yellow card) 55'; A. Vasas (yellow card) 17'; K. Csendom (yellow card) 46'; A. Foró (red card) 70'	Stadium: Budai II. László Stadion; Referee: Dr Géza Jakab

3 May 2014 26	Jászapáti	1–1	Rákospalota	Jászapáti
17:30 CEST (UTC+2)	D. Nagy (red card) 48'; K. Kiss 56'; Török (yellow card) 65'; Kiskapusi (yellow card) 71'; P. Volyák (yellow card) 77'; P. Frank (yellow card) 78'	Report	A. Honti (yellow card) 11'; P. Czimmermann 17', (yellow card) 24'; Z. Pálmai (yellow card) 56'; T. Kiss (yellow card) 69'; J. Olasz (yellow card) 88'	Stadium: Városi Stadion; Attendance: 100; Referee: József Ducsai

10 May 2014 27	Rákospalota	1–1	Tiszaújváros	Budapest
19:00 CEST (UTC+2)	A. Honti (yellow card) 3'; T. Herbály 32'; J. Olasz (yellow card) 66'; E. Pfister (red card) 90+3'	Report	P. Fodor (yellow card) 62'; F. Molnár (yellow card) 79'; G. Gaál 83'	Stadium: Budai II. László Stadion; Referee: Tibor Horváth

18 May 2014 28	Ebes	0–3	Rákospalota	Ebes
18:00 CEST (UTC+2)	Z. Barabás (yellow card) 11'	Report	J. Olasz 43', (yellow card) 87'; D. Szekér 48'; J. Birtalan (yellow card) 52'; N. Switzer (yellow card) 64'; P. Czimmermann 74'	Stadium: Ebesi Sporttelep; Attendance: 250; Referee: László Lovas

24 May 2014 29	Rákospalota	0–1	Felsőtárkány	Budapest
17:30 CEST (UTC+2)	J. Birtalan (yellow card) 63'; P. Czimmermann (yellow card) 86'	Report	Béres (yellow card) 51'; Z. Hajdu 58'; Kasza (yellow card) 75'; Á. Laurinyecz (yellow card) 81'; B. Balázs (yellow card) 83'	Stadium: Budai II. László Stadion; Attendance: 350; Referee: Ádám Pilók

1 June 2014 30	Putnok	0–2	Rákospalota	Putnok
18:00 CEST (UTC+2)	A. Szeleczki (yellow card) 53'; Truhanov (yellow card) 88'	Report	D. Szekér 39', (yellow card) 61'; A. Honti (yellow card) 69'; T. Herbály 88', (yellow card) 88'	Stadium: Várady Béla Sportközpont; Referee: László Sipos

== Statistics ==
=== Overall ===
Appearances (Apps) numbers are for appearances in competitive games only, including sub appearances.
Source: Competitions

No.	Player	Pos.	Nemzeti Bajnokság III			
No.	Player	Pos.	Apps	Goal	Booked	Sent off (straight red)
1	(Ukraine) Vladyslav Chanhelia	GK	13		1	
2	(Hungary) Balázs Dinka	DF	26		2	
3	(Hungary) Attila Honti	DF	26	1	9	1
4	(Hungary) Márk Aranyás		1			
4	(Hungary) Benjámin Kollár					
4	(Hungary) Dániel Lukács	FW	5			
5	(Hungary) Richárd Csiszár	FW	8	1	1	
6	(Hungary) Tamás Herbály	FW	13	2	1	
7	(Hungary) László Bojtor	FW	14	3		
7	(Hungary) Patrik Czimmermann	FW	25	3	9	
7	(Hungary) Ferenc Porkoláb		1			
8	(Hungary) Dávid Szekér	MF	26	4	10	1
9	(Hungary) Dániel Kovács	MF	3			
9	(Hungary) Péter Simek	MF	4			
9	(Hungary) Nabil Switzer	MF	24	1	2	
10	(Hungary) János Farkas	FW	16	4	3	
10	(Hungary) Tamás Kiss	MF	27	2	8	
11	(Hungary) Dávid Debreceni	DF	12	1	2	2
11	(Hungary) János Olasz	FW	12	3	8	
11	(Hungary) Richárd Vizi		1			
12	(Hungary) Bence Csiszár		2			
12	(Hungary) Tamás Grót		1		1	
12	(Hungary) Károly Kiss	MF	5	1	1	
12	(Hungary) Zsolt Pálmai	MF	7		1	
12	(Hungary) Erik Pfister	MF	5			1
13	(Hungary) János Birtalan	DF	9		3	
13	(Hungary) Máté Drávucz	GK				
14	(Hungary) Kristóf Csete	FW	1			
14	(Hungary) László Emperger	DF	7		1	
14	(Hungary) Zsolt Kollár	DF	24	3	6	2
14	(Hungary) Richárd Wágner	FW				
15	(Hungary) Gábor Horváth	DF	1			
15	(Hungary) Dávid Radványi	DF	9	2	2	1
16	(Hungary) Ákos Füle	MF	26		5	1
18	(Hungary) Viktor Lucz	MF	26	5	5	
20	(Hungary) Csaba Dániel	GK	10			
20	(Hungary) Attila Gyurkovics					
22	(Hungary) Máté Kléner					
23	(Hungary) Patrik Almási	GK	7			
Own goals				3		
Totals				36	81	9

=== Clean sheets ===
			Clean sheets
No.	Player	Games Played	Nemzeti Bajnokság III
1	(Ukraine) Vladyslav Chanhelia	13	3
20	(Hungary) Csaba Dániel	10	1
23	(Hungary) Patrik Almási	7	1
13	(Hungary) Máté Drávucz	0	
Totals			5
