= Zsolt Kollár =

Hungarian footballer (born 1979)

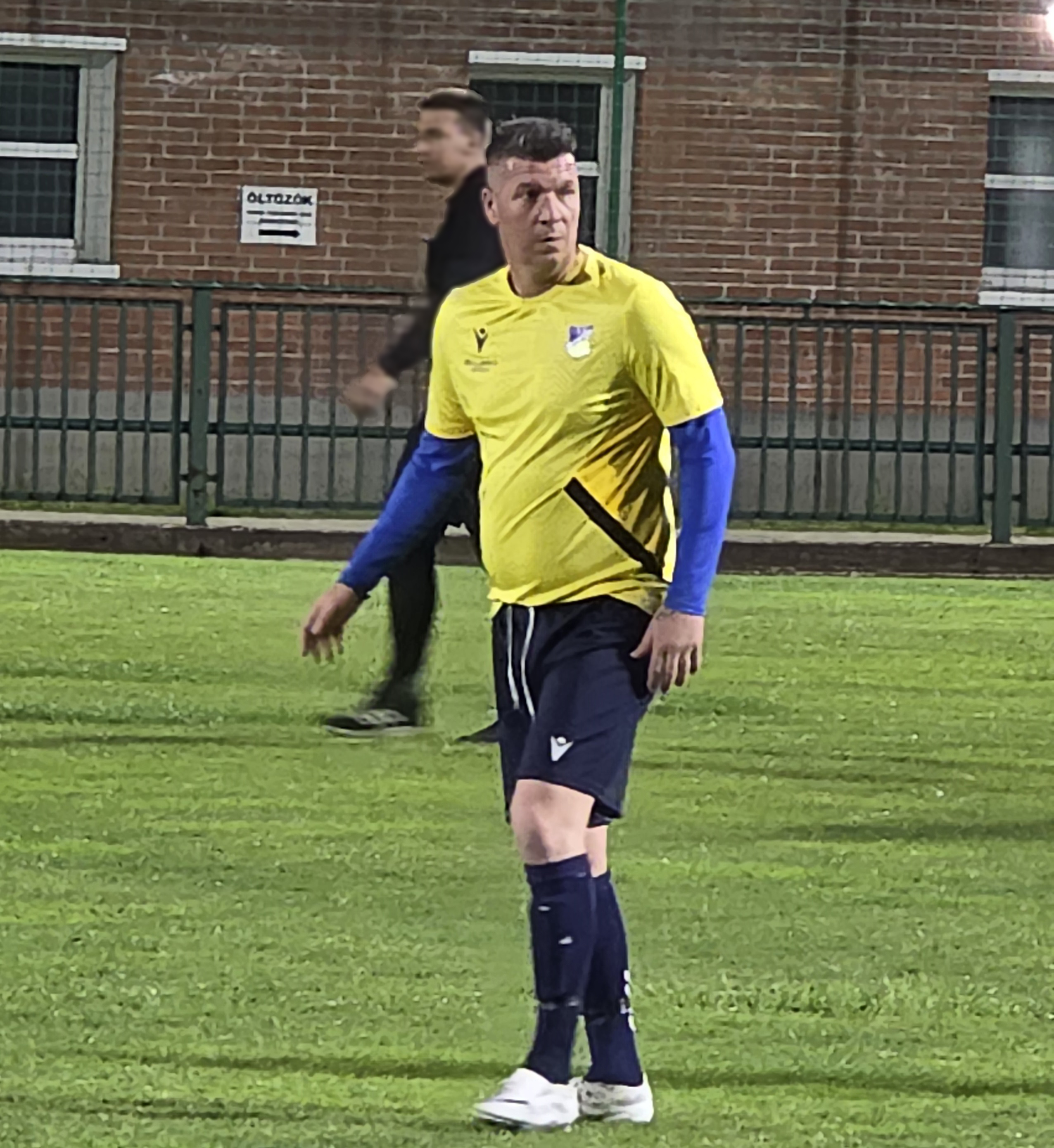
- Kollár playing for Rákospalota Old Boys in 2026

Personal information
- Date of birth: 12 November 1979 (age 46)
- Place of birth: Budapest, Hungary
- Height: 1.87 m (6 ft 2 in)
- Position: Defender

Team information
- Current team: REAC Sportiskola (player-manager)
- Number: 24

Youth career
- Vasas
- –1999: MTK

Senior career*
Years	Team	Apps	(Gls)
1999–2003	Kecskemét	134	(8)
2003–2005	Vasas	20	(2)
2005–2007	Felcsút	22	(2)
2007–2009	Budaörs	48	(10)
2009–2010	Schwarzenbach	25	(7)
2010–2011	Veszprém	20	(3)
2011–2012	Pilis Sport	15	(2)
2012	Törökbálint	8	(0)
2012–2017	Rákospalota	141	(35)
2017–2022	Testvériség	52	(17)
2019–2022	Testvériség II	37	(15)
2024	Rákospalota	0	(0)
2025–	REAC Sportiskola	6	(1)

International career
1994–1995	Hungary U16	20	(1)
1996	Hungary U17	12	(0)
1997	Hungary U18	10	(0)

Managerial career
- 2020–2024: Testvériség
- 2024: Rákospalota (player-manager)
- 2025–: REAC Sportiskola (player-manager)
- * Club domestic league appearances and goals as of 27 March 2026

Zsolt Kollár (born 12 November 1979) is a Hungarian professional footballer who plays as a defender. He is a player-manager at Megyei Bajnokság IV club REAC Sportiskola.

== Club career ==
On 16 January 1999, Kollár transferred from MTK, where he had played at junior level, to Nemzeti Bajnokság II club Kecskemét.

He played 16 times for Vasas in the 2003–04 season, which saw the club promoted to the Nemzeti Bajnokság I as Nemzeti Bajnokság II runners-up.

Five years after leaving Rákospalota, Kollár made his debut for Megyei Bajnokság I side Testvériség on 2 September 2017, in an away match that ended in a 3–2 victory, in which fellow former REAC player Zsolt Pálmai scored his first goal for the club, which proved to be the winning goal.

== Managerial career ==
=== Testvériség ===
Kollár led Testvériség to the 2022 Budapest Kupa final in April 2022, marking the first cup final of his managerial career. In the final on 27 April at Promontor utcai Stadion, his side took the lead twice, but 43. Sz. Építők equalized on both occasions before scoring the winning goal in the 76th minute, handing them a 3–2 defeat. After spending four and a half years in charge, he departed on 25 January 2024 following discussions with the club president, who indicated that a new impulse was needed for the team.

=== Rákospalota ===
On 13 March 2024, Kollár was appointed manager of recently promoted Rákospalota, competing in the Nemzeti Bajnokság III, replacing József Farkas. He had previously been associated with the club as a player and youth coach. He had already taken charge of the team in a match on 10 March, a 2–1 away defeat to Debreceni EAC. He was dismissed on 17 April following a run of poor results, and was replaced by Balázs Dinka, with Flórián Urbán, who had replaced him as manager of Testvériség in January, overseeing the professional work as sporting director.

== Career statistics ==
=== Club ===
As of match played 27 March 2026

Appearances and goals by club, season and competition
Club	Season	League			National cup (Note: Includes Magyar Kupa)		League cup (Note: Includes Ligakupa)		Other		Total	
Club	Season	Division	Apps	Goals	Apps	Goals	Apps	Goals	Apps	Goals	Apps	Goals
Kecskemét	1998–99	Nemzeti Bajnokság II	18	0	—		—		—		18	0
Kecskemét	1999–2000	Nemzeti Bajnokság II	36	1	—		—		—		36	1
Kecskemét	2000–01	Nemzeti Bajnokság II	29	2	—		—		—		29	2
Kecskemét	2001–02	Nemzeti Bajnokság II	25	2	2	0	—		—		27	2
Kecskemét	2002–03	Nemzeti Bajnokság II	26	3	1	0	—		—		27	3
Kecskemét	Total		134	8	3	0	—		—		137	8
Vasas	2003–04	Nemzeti Bajnokság II	16	2	3	0	—		—		19	2
Vasas	2004–05	Nemzeti Bajnokság I	4	0	—		—		—		4	0
Vasas	Total		20	2	3	0	—		—		23	2
Felcsút	2005–06	Nemzeti Bajnokság II	16	2	1	0	—		—		17	2
Felcsút	2006–07	Nemzeti Bajnokság II	6	0	1	0	—		—		7	0
Felcsút	Total		22	2	2	0	—		—		24	2
Budaörs	2006–07	Nemzeti Bajnokság II	13	1	—		—		—		13	1
Budaörs	2007–08	Nemzeti Bajnokság II	21	2	2	1	—		—		23	3
Budaörs	2008–09	Nemzeti Bajnokság II	14	7	1	1	5	0	—		20	8
Budaörs	Total		48	10	3	2	5	0	—		56	12
Schwarzenbach	2009–10	Gebietsliga Süd/Südost	25	7	—		—		—		25	7
Veszprém	2010–11	Nemzeti Bajnokság II	20	3	2	0	—		—		22	3
Pilis Sport	2011–12	Nemzeti Bajnokság III	15	2	—		—		2 (Note: Appearances in Pest Megyei Kupa)	1	17	3
Törökbálint	2011–12	Nemzeti Bajnokság III	8	0	—		—		—		8	0
Rákospalota	2012–13	Nemzeti Bajnokság III	26	9	3	1	—		4 (Note: Two appearances in Magyar Kupa qualifying rounds, two appearances and one goal in Nemzeti Bajnokság III relegation play-offs)	1	33	11
Rákospalota	2013–14	Nemzeti Bajnokság III	24	3	—		—		—		24	3
Rákospalota	2014–15	Nemzeti Bajnokság III	29	8	2	0	—		—		31	8
Rákospalota	2015–16	Nemzeti Bajnokság III	30	7	1	0	—		—		31	7
Rákospalota	2016–17	Nemzeti Bajnokság III	32	8	3	1	—		—		35	9
Rákospalota	Total		141	35	9	2	—		4	1	154	38
Testvériség	2017–18	Megyei Bajnokság I	14	1	1	0	—		—		15	1
Testvériség	2018–19	Megyei Bajnokság I	24	10	—		—		3 (Note: Two appearances in Magyar Kupa qualifying rounds, one appearance in Budapest Kupa)	0	27	10
Testvériség	2019–20	Megyei Bajnokság I	14	6	—		—		—		14	6
Testvériség	2020–21	Megyei Bajnokság I	0	0	—		—		—		0	0
Testvériség	2021–22	Megyei Bajnokság I	0	0	—		—		—		0	0
Testvériség	2022–23	Megyei Bajnokság I	—		0	0	—		—		0	0
Testvériség	Total		52	17	1	0	—		3	0	56	17
Testvériség II	2019–20	Megyei Bajnokság II	4	1	—		—		—		4	1
Testvériség II	2020–21	Megyei Bajnokság II	21	10	—		—		—		21	10
Testvériség II	2021–22	Megyei Bajnokság II	8	2	—		—		—		8	2
Testvériség II	2022–23	Megyei Bajnokság II	4	2	—		—		—		4	2
Testvériség II	Total		37	15	—		—		—		37	15
Rákospalota	2023–24	Nemzeti Bajnokság III	0	0	—		—		—		0	0
REAC Sportiskola	2025–26	Megyei Bajnokság IV	6	1	—		—		—		6	1
Career total			528	102	23	4	5	0	9	2	565	108

=== International ===
Appearances and goals by national team and year
Team	Year	Total	
Team	Year	Apps	Goals
Hungary U16	1994	3	0
Hungary U16	1995	17	1
Hungary U16	Total	20	1
Hungary U17	1996	12	0
Hungary U18	1997	10	0
Career total		42	1

Scores and results list Hungary's goal tally first, score column indicates score after each Kollár goal.

List of youth international goals scored by Zsolt Kollár
No.	Team	Cap	Date	Venue	Opponent	Score	Result	Competition	Ref.
1	Hungary U16	13	20 August 1995	Sipos Ferenc Sporttelep, Ráckeve, Hungary	Czech Republic U16	2–0	2–0	Ráckeve International Tournament	

== Honours ==
=== Manager ===
Testvériség

- Budapest Kupa runner-up: 2021–22
