= 2012–13 Rákospalotai EAC season =

Rákospalota
2012–13 season
- Owner: József Forgács
- Manager: János Mátyus
- Stadium: Budai II. László Stadion
- Nemzeti Bajnokság III (Mátra): 3rd
- 2012–13 Magyar Kupa: Round of 32
- 2013–14 Magyar Kupa: Second qualifying round
- Top goalscorer: League: Patrik Czimmermann; Zsolt Kollár; János Olasz (10 each); All: Patrik Czimmermann (12)
Home colours

The 2012–13 season was Rákospalotai Egyetértés Atlétikai Club's or shortly REAC's 66th competitive season, 1st consecutive season in the Nemzeti Bajnokság III and 100th year in existence as a football club. In addition to the domestic league, Rákospalota participated in the 2012–13 Magyar Kupa and the 2013–14 Magyar Kupa qualifying rounds.

János Mátyus remained the club's head coach, assisted by Balázs Dinka as the on-field coach, but he was also counted on on the pitch. Dinka was also appointed team captain.

At the end of the season, Rákospalota failed to qualify for the next Magyar Kupa in the Budapest regional qualifier after Rákosmente won 3–1 in the second qualifying round. Furthermore, due to the reorganization of the division and based on league position, a relegation play-off also had to be played, which they eventually won 7–3 to stay in NB III.

== First team squad ==
The players listed had league appearances and stayed until the end of the season.

Note: Flags indicate national team as defined under FIFA eligibility rules; some limited exceptions apply. Players may hold more than one non-FIFA nationality.

No.	Pos.	Nation	Player
2	DF	(Hungary) HUN	Balázs Dinka (captain)
4	DF	(Hungary) HUN	Viktor Buzás
5	DF	(Hungary) HUN	Tamás Mihályi
6	DF	(Hungary) HUN	Zsolt Kollár
7	FW	(Hungary) HUN	László Bojtor
8	FW	(Hungary) HUN	Patrik Czimmermann
9	FW	(Hungary) HUN	János Olasz
10	FW	(Hungary) HUN	László Szűcs
11	DF	(Hungary) HUN	Dávid Debreceni
12	MF	(Sweden) SWE	Kristian Benkő

No.	Pos.	Nation	Player
12	GK	(Hungary) HUN	Mátyás Esterházy
13	MF	(Hungary) HUN	Norbert Iflinger
14	N/A	(Hungary) HUN	Bence Kator
15	GK	(Hungary) HUN	Miklós Kovacsics
16	MF	(Hungary) HUN	Ákos Füle
17	DF	(Hungary) HUN	Attila Honti
18	MF	(Hungary) HUN	Viktor Lucz
19	MF	(Hungary) HUN	Nabil Switzer
20	FW	(Ukraine) UKR	Igor Nychenko
23	GK	(Hungary) HUN	Bence Steer

== Transfers ==
=== Transfers in ===
Date	Pos.	No.	Player	From	Ref
1 August 2012	DF	4	(Hungary) Gergő Dukon	Felsőtárkány	
1 August 2012	GK	12	(Hungary) Mátyás Esterházy	Budaörs	
1 August 2012	MF	10	(Hungary) Attila Héger	Kisnémedi MSE	
1 August 2012	MF	13	(Hungary) Norbert Iflinger	Újpest	
1 August 2012	DF	6	(Hungary) Zsolt Kollár	Törökbálint	
1 August 2012	FW	11	(Hungary) László Lőrincz	Dunakeszi	
1 August 2012	MF	18	(Hungary) Viktor Lucz	Vasas	
1 August 2012	DF	5	(Hungary) Tamás Mihályi	Budaörs	
1 August 2012	GK	43	(Hungary) Tamás Sirmán	III. Kerület	
1 August 2012	GK	23	(Hungary) Bence Steer	Vasas	
6 August 2012	DF	4	(Hungary) Viktor Buzás	Cegléd	
7 August 2012	MF	13	(Hungary) Lajos Szemán	Dunaharaszti	
9 August 2012	DF	17	(Hungary) Attila Honti	Vác	
13 August 2012	FW	7	(Hungary) László Bojtor	Eger	
13 August 2012	FW	9	(Hungary) János Olasz	Eger	
16 August 2012	MF	19	(Hungary) Nabil Switzer	Zalaegerszeg	
30 August 2012	MF	18	(Hungary) Zsolt Huszárik	Vasas	
21 February 2013		14	(Hungary) Bence Kator	(England) Camberley Town	
26 February 2013	DF	11	(Hungary) Dávid Debreceni	Eger	
26 February 2013	MF	16	(Hungary) Ákos Füle	Vác	
26 February 2013	GK	15	(Hungary) Miklós Kovacsics	Buday Sportiskola LKE	
26 February 2013	FW	10	(Hungary) László Szűcs	Dabas	
8 March 2013	FW	20	(Ukraine) Igor Nichenko	Győr	

=== Transfers out ===
Date	Pos.	No.	Player	To	Ref
16 July 2012	MF	20	(Hungary) Attila Menyhárt	Ferencváros	
26 July 2012	MF	33	(Hungary) Zoltán Böőr	Released (Note: Joined Dunaújváros on 15 August 2012.)	
26 July 2012	MF	4	(Hungary) Csaba Ködöböcz	III. Kerület	
30 July 2012	MF	18	(Hungary) Balázs Gáspár	BKV Előre	
31 July 2012	GK	16	(Hungary) Gellért Vajda	Hatvan	
1 August 2012	DF	13	(Hungary) Dániel Ferenc	Vecsés	
1 August 2012	DF	6	(Hungary) Máté Gulyás	Vác	
1 August 2012	MF	17	(Hungary) Károly Kiss	Szigetszentmiklós	
1 August 2012	DF	19	(Hungary) Tamás Tóvizi	Diósd	
8 August 2012	FW	10	(Hungary) Zsolt Szabó	Veszprém	
9 August 2012	FW	22	(Hungary) Zoltán Jovánczai	Szeged	
9 August 2012	DF	28	(Hungary) Gergő Menyhért	Pápa	
10 August 2012	MF	15	(Hungary) Tamás Alm	Rákosmente	
18 August 2012	DF	24	(Hungary) Márkó Sós	Kecskemét	
22 August 2012	FW	27	(Hungary) Péter Tóth	Zalaegerszeg	
6 September 2012	GK	1	(Hungary) Péter Tóth	Teskánd	
1 February 2013	MF	10	(Hungary) Attila Héger	(Austria) SV Lackenbach	
5 February 2013	FW	11	(Hungary) Bence Bacskai	Testvériség	
5 February 2013	MF	14	(Hungary) Márton Göntér	Testvériség	
5 February 2013	MF	18	(Hungary) Zsolt Huszárik	(Austria) FC Zell am See	
5 February 2013	MF	16	(Hungary) Károly Illés	Testvériség	
5 February 2013	FW	3	(Hungary) Attila Tóth	Testvériség	
20 February 2013	DF	4	(Hungary) Gergő Dukon	Mogyoródi KSK	
21 February 2013	FW	11	(Hungary) László Lőrincz	Kisnémedi MSE	
21 February 2013	GK	43	(Hungary) Tamás Sirmán	Gázgyár	
23 February 2013	MF	8	(Hungary) Tamás Kiss	Cegléd	
4 March 2013	MF	13	(Hungary) Lajos Szemán	Paks	

=== Loans in ===
Start date	End date	Pos.	No.	Player	From	Ref

=== Loans out ===
Start date	End date	Pos.	No.	Player	To	Ref
21 January 2013	End of season	FW	15	(Hungary) Máté Fézler	Diósgyőr	

== Friendlies ==
4 August 2012 Friendly	Ferencváros II	2–2	Rákospalota	Budapest
	Batik; M. Papp	Report

== Competitions ==
=== Overview ===
Competition	First match	Last match	Starting round	Final position	Record							
Competition	First match	Last match	Starting round	Final position	Pld	W	D	L	GF	GA	GD	Win %
Nemzeti Bajnokság III	18 August 2012	1 June 2013	Matchday 1	3rd	26	17	3	6	57	25	+32	65.38
Nemzeti Bajnokság III relegation play-offs	9 June 2013	16 June 2013	First leg	Winners	2	2	0	0	7	3	+4	100.00
2012–13 Magyar Kupa	12 August 2012	31 October 2012	Round of 128	Round of 32	3	2	0	1	7	5	+2	66.67
2013–14 Magyar Kupa qualifying rounds	17 April 2013	8 May 2013	First qualifying round	Second qualifying round	2	1	0	1	12	4	+8	50.00
Total					33	22	3	8	83	37	+46	66.67

Source: Competitions

=== Nemzeti Bajnokság III ===
==== League table ====
Pos	Team	Pld	W	D	L	GF	GA	GD	Pts	Qualification or relegation
1	Felsőtárkány (C)	26	17	6	3	55	24	+31	57	Qualification to promotion play-offs
2	Hatvan	26	17	5	4	52	26	+26	56	
3	Rákospalota (O)	26	17	3	6	57	25	+32	54	Qualification for the relegation play-offs
4	MTK II (O, R)	26	15	6	5	71	28	+43	51	Qualification for the relegation play-offs and not competed in any division next season
5	Rákosmenti KSK (Note: Remained in NB III due to withdrawals.)	26	13	8	5	58	28	+30	47	Qualification for the relegation play-offs

Source: Soccerway
(C) Champions; (O) Play-off winners; (R) Relegated

==== Results summary ====
Overall								Home						Away					
Pld	W	D	L	GF	GA	GD	Pts	W	D	L	GF	GA	GD	W	D	L	GF	GA	GD
26	17	3	6	57	25	+32	54	9	2	2	29	11	+18	8	1	4	28	14	+14

Source: HFF

==== Results by round ====
Round	1	2	3	4	5	6	7	8	9	10	11	12	13	14	15	16	17	18	19	20	21	22	23	24	25	26
Ground	A	H	A	H	A	H	A	H	A	H	A	H	A	H	A	H	A	H	A	H	A	H	A	H	A	H
Result	W	W	L	W	L	L	L	D	W	W	W	D	W	L	W	W	W	W	W	W	L	W	W	W	D	W
Position	3	3	6	4	6	7	8	7	6	6	5	4	4	6	3	3	3	3	3	3	3	3	3	3	3	3
Points	3	6	6	9	9	9	9	10	13	16	19	20	23	23	26	29	32	35	38	41	41	44	47	50	51	54

Source: Matches
A = Away; H = Home; W = Win; D = Draw; L = Loss

==== Score overview ====
Opposition	Home score	Away score	Aggregate score	Double
Bükkábrány	4–1	0–1	4–2	No
Eger II	3–0	2–0	5–0	Yes
Felsőtárkány	1–0	0–1	1–1	No
Gyöngyös	1–2	1–0	2–2	No
Hatvan	2–1	0–2	2–3	No
Maglód	3–1	2–1	5–2	Yes
MTK II	1–1	1–2	1–3	No
Nagybátony	4–2	2–1	6–3	Yes
Ózd	3–0	8–0	11–0	Yes
Rákosmenti KSK	0–0	3–3	3–3	No
Salgótarján	1–2	5–3	6–5	No
Tápiószecső	2–1	1–0	3–1	Yes
Tura	4–0	3–0	7–0	Yes

==== Matches ====
18 August 2012 1	Salgótarján	3–5	Rákospalota	Salgótarján
17:00 CEST (UTC+2)	D. Birincsik 6', 28'; E. Bonivárt 36'	Report	P. Czimmermann 18', (yellow card) 88'; Lőrincz 26', 51', 75'; T. Mihályi (yellow card) 49'; J. Olasz 76'; K. Illés (yellow card) 90'	Stadium: Tó-strandi Sporttelep; Referee: László Szarvas

26 August 2012 2	Rákospalota	4–2	Nagybátony	Budapest
18:00 CEST (UTC+2)	P. Czimmermann 12', 29', 78', (yellow card) 51'; Kollár 25'; M. Göntér (red card) 82'	Report	Ndjodo 45', (yellow card) 60'; A. Dudás (yellow card) 50'; G. Alapi 55'; T. Almási (yellow card) 56'; Vámosi (yellow card) 73'; G. Roma (yellow card) 76'; Németh (yellow card) 80'	Stadium: Budai II. László Stadion; Referee: Zsolt Szigetvári

1 September 2012 3	Hatvan	2–0	Rákospalota	Hatvan
16:30 CEST (UTC+2)	Á. Székesi (yellow card) 26'; G. Surányi 60'; R. Szabó 64'; B. Juhász (yellow card) 86'	Report	J. Olasz (yellow card) 30'; V. Buzás (yellow card) 45'; Kollár (yellow card) 82'	Stadium: Népkert Sporttelep; Referee: Árpád Jakab

9 September 2012 4	Rákospalota	3–0	Ózd	Budapest
18:00 CEST (UTC+2)	J. Olasz 19', 77'; V. Buzás 45'	Report	B. Kovács (yellow card) 73'	Stadium: Budai II. László Stadion; Attendance: 200; Referee: Tamás Kovács

15 September 2012 5	Bükkábrány	1–0	Rákospalota	Bükkábrány
16:30 CEST (UTC+2)	A. Sebe (yellow card) 26'; G. Gallik 75', (red card) 88'; D. Balogh (yellow card) 82'; A. Banu (yellow card) 85'; K. Bukta (yellow card) 90+1'	Report	J. Olasz (yellow card) 60'; Kollár (yellow card) 72'; T. Mihályi (yellow card) 72'; A. Honti (yellow card) 76'; P. Czimmermann (red card) 86'	Stadium: Szép Pál Sporttelep; Attendance: 250; Referee: Zoltán Tóth

23 September 2012 6	Rákospalota	1–2	Gyöngyös	Budapest
18:00 CEST (UTC+2)	Bojtor 2'; V. Buzás (yellow card) 43'	Report	V. Horváth 8', 77', (yellow card) 77'; R. Vidra (yellow card) 26'	Stadium: Budai II. László Stadion; Referee: András Solymosi

29 September 2012 7	Felsőtárkány	1–0	Rákospalota	Felsőtárkány
16:00 CEST (UTC+2)	Á. Baji 86'; B. Ragó (yellow card) 89'	Report	Huszárik (yellow card) 49'; Kollár (yellow card) 83'	Stadium: Felsőtárkány SC Sporttelep; Referee: Gegő Janitz

6 October 2012 8	Rákospalota	1–1	MTK II	Budapest
17:30 CEST (UTC+2)	J. Olasz (yellow card) 45'; Bojtor 62'; V. Buzás (yellow card) 64'; Huszárik (yellow card) 74'; Dinka (yellow card) 85'	Report	Bese 27'; Hajdú (yellow card) 41'; Ladányi (yellow card) 71'	Stadium: Budai II. László Stadion; Referee: Bálint Dolnegó

13 October 2012 9	Maglód	1–2	Rákospalota	Maglód
15:00 CEST (UTC+2)	Weisz; R. Szőke (yellow card) 44'; I. Bornemissza (yellow card) 62'; B. Polyák (yellow card) 76'	Report	Kollár; J. Olasz; Huszárik (yellow card) 29'; A. Héger (yellow card) 44'; Benkő (yellow card) 63'; T. Mihályi (yellow card) 81'; L. Szemán (yellow card) 90+4'	Stadium: Kertész Károly Stadion; Referee: József Ducsai

21 October 2012 10	Rákospalota	2–1	Tápiószecső	Budapest
17:00 CEST (UTC+2)	T. Mihályi (yellow card) 39'; Benkő (yellow card) 54', (goal) 62'; V. Buzás (yellow card) 72'; Kollár 82'; B. Bacskai (yellow card) 89'	Report	G. Németh 20'; M. Horváth (yellow card) 39'; B. Majzik (yellow card) 49'; Balaskó (yellow card) 64'	Stadium: Budai II. László Stadion; Referee: László Szarvas

4 November 2012 12	Rákospalota	0–0	Rákosmente	Budapest
17:00 CET (UTC+1)	A. Honti (yellow card) 34'; V. Buzás (yellow card) 35'; J. Olasz (yellow card) 63'; A. Héger (yellow card) 77'; L. Szemán (red card) 90+3'	Report	Á. Turi (yellow card) 35'; P. Szolnoki (yellow card) 60'; Szirtesi (yellow card) 66'	Stadium: Budai II. László Stadion; Referee: Zoltán Tóth

11 November 2012 13	Eger II	0–2	Rákospalota	Eger
13:30 CEST (UTC+2)	Á. Zsíros (yellow card) 85'	Report	J. Olasz 10', 51'; Huszárik (yellow card) 68'; B. Bacskai (yellow card) 89'	Stadium: Eger Felsővárosi Sporttelep; Referee: Árpád Jakab

17 November 2012 11	Tura	0–3	Rákospalota	Tura
13:00 CET (UTC+1)	R. Tatár (yellow card) 38'	Report	J. Olasz 35', 86'; N. Switzer (yellow card) 45'; A. Honti (yellow card) 50'; N. Iflinger 61'	Stadium: Turai sportpálya Referee: László Szarvas

9 March 2013 14	Rákospalota	1–2	Salgótarján	Budapest
16:30 CET (UTC+1)	I. Nychenko 44'; B. Kator (yellow card) 58'; Kollár (yellow card) 65'; P. Czimmermann (yellow card) 83'	Report	C. Lenkó (yellow card) 9'; Ramos (yellow card) 31', (goal) 81'; Novák 59', (yellow card) 75'; B. Mészáros (yellow card) 62'	Stadium: Budai II. László Stadion; Referee: László Mencsik

24 March 2013 16	Rákospalota	2–1	Hatvan	Budapest
17:00 CET (UTC+1)	J. Olasz 4', (yellow card) 87'; Kollár 49' (pen.); D. Debreceni (yellow card) 52'; T. Mihályi (yellow card) 67'; Á. Füle (red card) 79'	Report	D. Kóczián 18', (red card) 69'; M. Simon (yellow card) 38'; K. Horváth (yellow card) 45'	Stadium: Budai II. László Stadion; Attendance: 150; Referee: Bálint Dolnegó

7 April 2013 18	Rákospalota	4–1	Bükkábrány	Budapest
18:30 CEST (UTC+2)	G. Bihari 2' (o.g.); N. Switzer 19'; P. Czimmermann 55', (yellow card) 56'; Benkő 90+1'	Report	Á. Kovács II (yellow card) 2'; T. Tóth (yellow card) 28'; K. Klavács 67'	Stadium: Budai II. László Stadion; Attendance: 300; Referee: László Mencsik

14 April 2013 19	Gyöngyös	0–1	Rákospalota	Gyöngyös
16:30 CEST (UTC+2)	Á. Kovács I (yellow card) 67'	Report	Benkő 53'; P. Czimmermann (yellow card) 60'; V. Lucz (yellow card) 82'	Stadium: Kömlei Károly Sporttelep; Referee: Árpád Jakab

21 April 2013 20	Rákospalota	1–0	Felsőtárkány	Budapest
19:00 CEST (UTC+2)	Benkő (yellow card) 73'; Kollár 90+1'	Report	Á. Szűcs (yellow card) 46'; N. Kaszás (yellow card) 62'	Stadium: Budai II. László Stadion; Referee: Szabolcs Sinka

24 April 2013 17	Ózd	0–8	Rákospalota	Ózd
17:00 CEST (UTC+2)	K. Csák (yellow card) 36'; R. Török (yellow card) 70'	Report	Bojtor 4', 53'; A. Honti 15'; N. Switzer 25', 33', 59', 61'; I. Nychenko 43'; V. Lucz (yellow card) 71'	Stadium: Városi Stadion; Attendance: 100; Referee: Tamás Kovács
Note: The match was originally scheduled for 30 March 2013, but was postponed due to bad weather conditions.

28 April 2013 21	MTK II	2–1	Rákospalota	Budapest
11:00 CEST (UTC+2)	Hajdú (yellow card) 28'; Bese 45'; Batizi-Pócsi 46'	Report	Á. Füle (yellow card) 35'; Benkő (yellow card) 53', (goal) 84'; V. Buzás (red card) 89'	Stadium: Promontor utcai Stadion; Referee: Gábor Varga

1 May 2013 15	Nagybátony	1–2	Rákospalota	Bátonyterenye
17:00 CEST (UTC+2)	Sárközi 13'; G. Alapi (yellow card) 35'; G. Szabó (yellow card) 90'	Report	Bojtor (yellow card) 9', (goal) 48'; D. Debreceni (yellow card) 83'; Benkő 88'; N. Switzer (yellow card) 90+2'	Stadium: Bátonyterenyei TC sportpálya Referee: Zsolt Kis

5 May 2013 22	Rákospalota	3–1	Maglód	Budapest
19:00 CEST (UTC+2)	P. Czimmermann 6', (yellow card) 53'; Kollár 20', 49'; Á. Füle (yellow card) 50'; I. Nychenko (yellow card) 72'	Report	Weisz 27', (yellow card) 76'; R. Szőke (yellow card) 33'; O. Molnár (yellow card) 45'; Z. G. Németh (yellow card) 48'; L. Vincze (red card) 67'; R. Makovi (yellow card) 68'	Stadium: Budai II. László Stadion; Referee: Zoltán Tóth

11 May 2013 23	Tápiószecső	0–1	Rákospalota	Tápiószecső
17:00 CEST (UTC+2)	B. Bátori (yellow card) 77'; B. Majzik (yellow card) 85'	Report	P. Czimmermann 5'; A. Honti (yellow card) 36'	Stadium: Tápiószecső FC Sporttelep; Referee: Gergő Bogár

19 May 2013 24	Rákospalota	4–0	Tura	Budapest
19:00 CEST (UTC+2)	Benkő 8', 19', 66'; P. Czimmermann (yellow card) 33'; T. Mihályi (yellow card) 82'; Á. Füle (yellow card) 84'; I. Nychenko 86'	Report	K. Less (yellow card) 58'; S. Szilágyi (yellow card) 67'	Stadium: Budai II. László Stadion; Referee: Zsolt Szigetvári

25 May 2013 25	Rákosmente	3–3	Rákospalota	Budapest
17:00 CEST (UTC+2)	G. Dara 30'; B. Lázár (yellow card) 62'; I. Kovács 67'; B. Murinai 88'; G. Lanczkor (yellow card) 90+3'	Report	Dinka (yellow card) 55'; J. Olasz 59', (red card) 90+3'; P. Czimmermann 71', (yellow card) 73'; Kollár 75'; Á. Füle (yellow card) 88'	Stadium: RKSK Sporttelep; Referee: Csaba Molnár

1 June 2013 26	Rákospalota	3–0	Eger II	Budapest
17:00 CEST (UTC+2)	L. Szűcs (yellow card) 45'; T. Mihályi 72'; Benkő 88'; Kollár 89'	Report	M. Kiskartali (yellow card) 60'; G. Szabó (yellow card) 72'	Stadium: Budai II. László Stadion; Referee: Gergő Janitz

==== Relegation play-offs ====
The draw was announced on 4 June 2013. Rákospalota were drawn against Megyei Bajnokság I champions Berkenye of Nógrád County.

9 June 2013 First leg	Rákospalota	3–1	Berkenye	Budapest
17:00 CEST (UTC+2)	P. Czimmermann 33'; Kollár 70'; V. Lucz 87'	Report	G. Gulyás 49'; V. Benke (red card) 69'	Stadium: Budai II. László Stadion; Referee: Dániel Becséri

16 June 2013 Second leg	Berkenye	2–4 (3–7 agg.)	Rákospalota	Berkenye
17:00 CEST (UTC+2)	G. Gulyás (yellow card) 37'; Greff (yellow card) 44'; T. Fábri 59'; G. Tányéros (yellow card) 67'; N. Mravik (yellow card) 68'; Páles (yellow card) 80'; Rusvay 85'	Report	V. Lucz 16'; Á. Füle (yellow card) 32'; P. Czimmermann (yellow card) 42', (goal) 43'; A. Honti 45'; V. Buzás (yellow card) 63'; N. Iflinger 80'	Stadium: Berkenye SE Sporttelep; Referee: Ádám Farkas
Note: Rákospalota won 7–3 on aggregate and therefore both clubs remained in their respective leagues.

=== 2012–13 Magyar Kupa ===
12 August 2012 Round of 128	Bánk	2–4 (a.e.t.)	Rákospalota	Bánk
17:00 CEST (UTC+2)	G. Csizmár (yellow card) 12'; B. Sági (yellow card) 19'; B. Puruczki 28', 51'; I. Kovács (yellow card) 69'	Report	P. Czimmermann 26'; Kollár 85'; J. Olasz 106'; Bojtor 117'	Stadium: Bánk SE Sporttelep; Referee: Csaba Molnár

26 September 2012 Round of 64	Csanádpalota	1–2	Rákospalota	Csanádpalota
15:30 CEST (UTC+2)	P. Dan-Stefan 22'; V. Vicentio-Florin (yellow card) 88'	Report	P. Czimmermann 38'; A. Honti 52'; G. Dukon (yellow card) 80'	Stadium: Csanádpalota Sportpálya; Attendance: 400; Referee: Bálint Kocsondi

31 October 2012 Round of 32	Rákospalota	1–2	Paks	Budapest
17:00 CEST (UTC+2)	V. Buzás 23'; A. Héger (yellow card) 84'; Kollár (yellow card) 89'	Report	Fiola 13', 18'	Stadium: Budai II. László Stadion; Attendance: 250; Referee: Balázs Böcskei

=== 2013–14 Magyar Kupa qualifying rounds ===
17 April 2013 First qualifying round	AFC Soroksár	1–11	Rákospalota	Budapest
18:00 CEST (UTC+2)	Z. Borsodi 72'	Report	V. Lucz 8', 29'; A. Honti 33'; I. Nychenko 35'; B. Kator (yellow card) 41'; T. Mihályi 50', 64'; N. Switzer 53'; D. Debreceni 69'; Benkő 78'; Bojtor 81', 89'	Stadium: Budai II. László Stadion; Referee: László Landeszmann

8 May 2013 Second qualifying round	Rákosmente	3–1	Rákospalota	Budapest
17:30 CEST (UTC+2)	G. Lanczkor (yellow card) 26'; D. Molnár 42'; V. Lucz 45' (o.g.); T. Less (yellow card) 76'; M. Borsi 90+1'	Report	V. Buzás (red card) 28'; I. Nychenko 56'; B. Kator (yellow card) 87'; M. Kovacsics (yellow card) 90+2'	Stadium: RKSK Sporttelep; Referee: Gergő Király

== Statistics ==
=== Overall ===
Appearances (Apps) numbers are for appearances in competitive games only, including sub appearances.
Source: Competitions

No.	Player	Pos.	Nemzeti Bajnokság III (Note: Includes Nemzeti Bajnokság III, Relegation play-offs)				Magyar Kupa (Note: Includes 2012–13 Magyar Kupa, 2013–14 Magyar Kupa qualifying rounds)				Total			
No.	Player	Pos.	Apps	Goal	Booked	Sent off (straight red)	Apps	Goal	Booked	Sent off (straight red)	Apps	Goal	Booked	Sent off (straight red)
2	(Hungary) Balázs Dinka	DF	26		2		3				29		2	
4	(Hungary) Viktor Buzás	DF	21	1	6	1	3	1		1	24	2	6	2
4	(Hungary) Gergő Dukon	DF	5				2		1		7		1	
5	(Hungary) Tamás Mihályi	DF	20	1	6		4	2			24	3	6	
6	(Hungary) Zsolt Kollár	DF	28	10	4		5	1	1		33	11	5	
7	(Hungary) László Bojtor	FW	28	5	1		5	3			33	8	1	
8	(Hungary) Patrik Czimmermann	FW	18	10	9	1	3	2			21	12	9	1
9	(Hungary) János Olasz	FW	21	10	5	1	3	1			24	11	5	1
10	(Hungary) Attila Héger	MF	13		2		2		1		15		3	
10	(Hungary) László Szűcs	FW	6		1		1				7		1	
11	(Hungary) Bence Bacskai	FW	6		2		2				8		2	
11	(Hungary) Dávid Debreceni	DF	15		2		2	1			17	1	2	
11	(Hungary) László Lőrincz	FW	6	3			1				7	3		
12	(Sweden) Kristian Benkő	MF	22	9	4		4	1			26	10	4	
12	(Hungary) Mátyás Esterházy	GK												
13	(Hungary) Norbert Iflinger	MF	18	2			3				21	2		
13	(Hungary) Lajos Szemán	MF	3		1	1	2				5		1	1
14	(Hungary) Márton Göntér	MF	7			1	2				9			1
14	(Hungary) Bence Kator		9		1		2		2		11		3	
15	(Hungary) Miklós Kovacsics	GK	1				2		1		3		1	
16	(Hungary) Ákos Füle	MF	9		5	1	2				11		5	1
16	(Hungary) Károly Illés	MF	1		1		1				2		1	
17	(Hungary) Attila Honti	DF	24	2	4		3	2			27	4	4	
18	(Hungary) Zsolt Huszárik	MF	11		4		2				13		4	
18	(Hungary) Viktor Lucz	MF	10	2	2		4	2			14	4	2	
19	(Hungary) Nabil Switzer	MF	22	5	2		3	1			25	6	2	
20	(Ukraine) Igor Nychenko	FW	10	3	1		2	2			12	5	1	
23	(Hungary) Bence Steer	GK	26				2				28			
43	(Hungary) Tamás Sirmán	GK	2				1				3			
Own goals				1								1		
Totals				64	65	6		19	6	1		83	71	7

=== Hat-tricks ===
No.	Player	Against	Result	Date	Competition	Round
11	(Hungary) László Lőrincz	Salgótarján	5–3 (A)	18 August 2012	Nemzeti Bajnokság III	1
8	(Hungary) Patrik Czimmermann	Nagybátony	4–2 (H)	26 August 2012	Nemzeti Bajnokság III	2
19	(Hungary) Nabil Switzer^{4}	Ózd	8–0 (A)	24 April 2013	Nemzeti Bajnokság III	17
12	(Sweden) Kristian Benkő	Tura	4–0 (H)	19 May 2013	Nemzeti Bajnokság III	24

^{4} – Player scored four goals.

=== Clean sheets ===
			Clean sheets		
No.	Player	Games Played	Nemzeti Bajnokság III	Magyar Kupa	Total
23	(Hungary) Bence Steer	28	10	0	10
15	(Hungary) Miklós Kovacsics	3	1	0	1
43	(Hungary) Tamás Sirmán	3	0	0	0
12	(Hungary) Mátyás Esterházy	0			0
Totals			11	0	11
