= József Farkas (footballer, born 1966) =

Hungarian footballer

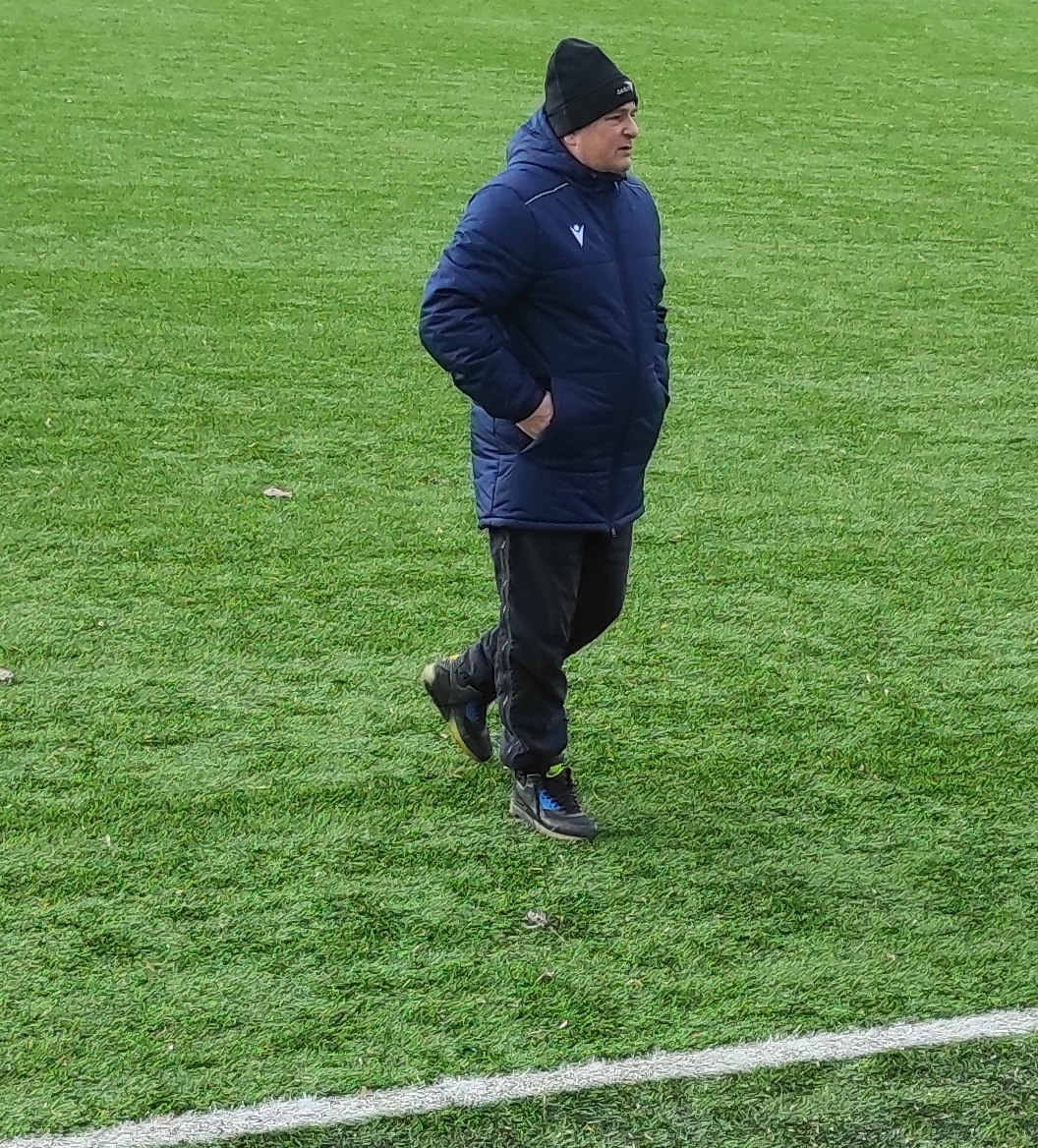
- Farkas with Rákospalota in 2024

Personal information
- Date of birth: 6 July 1966 (age 60)
- Place of birth: Budapest, Hungary
- Height: 1.79 m (5 ft 10 in)
- Position: Midfielder

Senior career*
Years	Team	Apps	(Gls)
1985–1989	Volán	4	(0)
1989–1990	Mezőtúri AFC		
1990–1991	Volán	26	(4)
1991–1997	BVSC-Zugló	157	(13)
1997–1998	Szeged-Dorozsma	18	(0)
1998	BVSC-Zugló	15	(0)
1998–1999	Kiskunfélegyháza	24	(1)
1999–2000	BVSC-Zugló	5	(0)
2000	Vecsés		
2000–2001	Dunakeszi VSE	18	(4)
2001–2002	BVSC-Zugló	9	(0)
2002	Soproni VSE	5	(2)
Total		281	(24)

Managerial career
- 1999–2001: BVSC-Zugló (assistant)
- 2001: Rákospalota (assistant)
- 2001–2002: FC Sopron (assistant)
- 2002: FC Sopron (caretaker)
- 2002: FC Sopron (assistant)
- 2002: FC Sopron (caretaker)
- 2023–2024: Rákospalota
- 2024–2025: Vasas (assistant)
- * Club domestic league appearances and goals

József Farkas (born 6 July 1966) is a Hungarian professional football coach and former player who last served as assistant manager of Vasas.

== Coaching career ==
After assistant managerial spells at BVSC-Zugló, Rákospalota, Farkas followed Tibor Simon from Rákospalota to FC Sopron on 11 December 2001, continuing as his assistant manager, and temporarily took charge of the team on 21 April 2002 following Simon's assault. On 27 April 2002, György Bognár was appointed manager, after which Farkas returned to his role as assistant, having recorded one win and one draw in his two matches in charge.

Following his return to an assistant role under Bognár at FC Sopron, Farkas was designated caretaker manager for the match against Honvéd on 25 August 2002 after Bognár offered his resignation, and although he led the team from the bench, Bognár remained the official manager due to Farkas lacking the required UEFA A licence. On 2 September 2002, András Komjáti was appointed manager, with Farkas continuing as part of the coaching staff as his assistant.

Farkas managed recently promoted Nemzeti Bajnokság III club Rákospalota from 2023 until his departure on 13 March 2024, after which he was succeeded by Zsolt Kollár following the team's struggles in the 2023–24 season.

Farkas served as assistant coach at Nemzeti Bajnokság II side Vasas from 5 September 2024, joining the staff of Attila Pintér following his appointment as head coach. He left the position on 5 June 2025, when Pintér departed the club after narrowly missing out on promotion and was replaced by Gábor Erős.

== Career statistics ==
=== Club ===
Appearances and goals by club, season and competition
Club	Season	League			Magyar Kupa		Europe		Total	
Club	Season	Division	Apps	Goals	Apps	Goals	Apps	Goals	Apps	Goals
Volán	1985–86	Nemzeti Bajnokság I	4	0	—		—		4	0
Volán	1990–91	Nemzeti Bajnokság I	26	4	—		—		26	4
Volán	Total		30	4	—		—		30	4
BVSC-Zugló	1991–92	Nemzeti Bajnokság I	29	4	—		—		29	4
BVSC-Zugló	1992–93	Nemzeti Bajnokság I	27	4	4	0	—		31	4
BVSC-Zugló	1993–94	Nemzeti Bajnokság I	19	2	2	1	—		21	3
BVSC-Zugló	1994–95	Nemzeti Bajnokság I	27	3	10	1	—		37	4
BVSC-Zugló	1995–96	Nemzeti Bajnokság I	26	0	12	0	—		38	0
BVSC-Zugló	1996–97	Nemzeti Bajnokság I	29	0	10	1	2 (Note: Appearances in UEFA Cup)	1	41	2
BVSC-Zugló	Total		157	13	38	3	2	1	197	17
Szeged-Dorozsma	1997–98	Nemzeti Bajnokság II	18	0	3	1	—		21	1
BVSC-Zugló	1997–98	Nemzeti Bajnokság I	15	0	—		—		15	0
Kiskunfélegyháza	1998–99	Nemzeti Bajnokság III	24	1	—		—		24	1
BVSC-Zugló	1999–2000	Nemzeti Bajnokság II	5	0	2	0	—		7	0
Dunakeszi	2000–01	Nemzeti Bajnokság III	18	4	—		—		18	4
Dunakeszi	2000–01	Megyei Bajnokság I	18	4	—		—		18	4
BVSC-Zugló	2001–02	Megyei Bajnokság I	9	0	—		—		9	0
Soproni VSE	2001–02	Megyei Bajnokság I	5	2	—		—		5	2
Career total			281	24	43	4	2	1	326	29

=== Managerial ===
Managerial record by team and tenure
Team	From	To	Record					Ref
Team	From	To	P	W	D	L	Win %	Ref
FC Sopron (caretaker)	21 April 2002	29 April 2002	2	1	1	0	50.00	
FC Sopron (caretaker)	25 August 2002	2 September 2002	1	0	1	0	0.00	
Rákospalota	3 September 2023	13 March 2024	13	4	0	9	30.77	
Total			16	5	2	9	31.25	

== Honours ==
=== Player ===
BVSC-Zugló

- Magyar Kupa runner-up: 1995–96, 1996–97
