= 2023–24 Rákospalotai EAC season =

Rákospalota
2023–24 season
- Chief executives: Tamás Forgács; Ferenc Sági
- Manager: Zsombor Käfer (until 30 August); József Farkas (from 30 August to 13 March); Zsolt Kollár (from 13 March to 17 April); Flórián Urbán (from 17 April)
- Stadium: Budai II. László Stadion
- Nemzeti Bajnokság III (Northeast): 15th
- Top goalscorer: League: Levente Lustyik; György Tóth (4 each); All: Levente Lustyik; György Tóth (4 each)

The 2023–24 season is Rákospalota Egyetértés Atlétikai Club's 77th competitive season, 1st season in the Nemzeti Bajnokság III after the relegation in 2017 and 111th year in existence as a football club.

The team is back in NB III after beating Kállósemjén at the 2023 Megyei Bajnokság I promotion play-off 10–4 on aggregate. Zsombor Käfer who won promotion last year got sacked and got replaced by József Farkas after the 4th round. On 13 March 2024, Farkas has been replaced due to 19 points and thirteenth place as head coach by Zsolt Kollár, who previously worked as a player from 2012 to 2017 and then as a youth coach at the club. He has also failed to deliver victories for the club fleeing relegation, scoring just 1 point in 5 rounds. In his place, Flórián Urbán, who really started his coaching career at REAC and brought the team to the NB I in 2005, was appointed on 17 April 2024 to lead the team to the last rounds of the league.

== Kits ==
| Home 2023 | Away 2023 | Home 2024 | Away 2024 |

== First team squad ==
The players listed had league appearances and stayed until the end of the season.

Note: Flags indicate national team as defined under FIFA eligibility rules; some limited exceptions apply. Players may hold more than one non-FIFA nationality.

| No. | Pos. | Nation | Player |
|---|---|---|---|
| 3 | DF | HUN | Áron Csákány |
| 4 | DF | HUN | Krisztián Kárász |
| 5 | MF | HUN | Marcell Markos |
| 7 | DF | HUN | Dájmond Csúri |
| 8 | MF | HUN | Levente Lustyik |
| 8 | N/A | HUN | Ákos Varga |
| 9 | FW | HUN | Patrik Kaszala |
| 10 | MF | HUN | Tamás Kiss |
| 10 | DF | HUN | Zoltán Lakatos |
| 11 | DF | HUN | Gergő Nagy (captain) |
| 12 | MF | HUN | Zalán Werle |
| 13 | N/A | HUN | Kálmán Horváth |
| 14 | N/A | HUN | Dominik Újvári |
| 16 | MF | HUN | Martin Csernák |
| 16 | N/A | HUN | Tamás Szikora |
| 17 | N/A | HUN | Tamás Micheller |

| No. | Pos. | Nation | Player |
|---|---|---|---|
| 18 | FW | HUN | Pantelis Popgeorgiev |
| 18 | MF | HUN | Barnabás Tóth |
| 20 | FW | HUN | Barnabás Gál |
| 21 | N/A | HUN | Márk Tóth |
| 21 | N/A | HUN | Milán Vajda |
| 22 | GK | HUN | Zoltán Dulka |
| 22 | GK | HUN | Martin Lipcsei |
| 23 | DF | HUN | Csaba Lakatos |
| 23 | FW | HUN | György Tóth |
| 37 | MF | HUN | Roland Bedő |
| 69 | N/A | HUN | Benedek Barcsai |
| 69 | DF | HUN | Tamás Petrezselyem |
| 69 | N/A | HUN | Ádám Uhercsák |
| 77 | MF | HUN | László Csitári |
| 77 | DF | HUN | Viktor Mészáros |

== Transfers ==
=== Transfers in ===
| Date | Pos. | No. | Player | From | Ref |
|---|---|---|---|---|---|
| 13 July 2023 | DF | 3 | (Hungary) Áron Csákány | Kelen | |
| 13 July 2023 | MF | 8 | (Hungary) Levente Lustyik | Dorog | |
| 13 July 2023 | N/A | 77 | (Hungary) Dávid Skripek | Paks | |
| 14 July 2023 | DF | 4 | (Hungary) Krisztián Kárász | Dorog | |
| 17 July 2023 | MF | 37 | (Hungary) Roland Bedő | Zalaegerszeg II | |
| 17 July 2023 | MF | 21 | (Hungary) Dávid Soós | Hatvan | |
| 17 July 2023 | FW | 23 | (Hungary) György Tóth | Komárom | |
| 21 July 2023 | GK | 1 | (Hungary) Alex Szalay | Eger | |
| 26 July 2023 | DF | 77 | (Hungary) Viktor Mészáros | Újpest | |
| 27 July 2023 | GK | 1 | (Hungary) Mirkó Mészáros | Pestszentimre | |
| 1 August 2023 | MF | 12 | (Hungary) Zalán Werle | Békéscsaba | |
| 2 August 2023 | DF | 69 | (Hungary) Noel Palaga | Hatvan | |
| 7 August 2023 | N/A | 18 | (Hungary) Ádám Hajzlinszki | Rákosmente | |
| 18 August 2023 | DF | 26 | (Hungary) Csaba Lakatos | (Austria) ASV Drassburg | |
| 25 August 2023 | N/A | 21 | (Hungary) Milán Vajda | Újpest | |
| 2 September 2023 | N/A | 18 | (Hungary) Tamás Szikora | Újpest | |
| 12 February 2024 | DF | 7 | (Hungary) Dájmond Csúri | Martfű | |
| 12 February 2024 | N/A | 26 | (Hungary) László Varga | Pénzügyőr II | |
| 14 February 2024 | FW | 20 | (Hungary) Barnabás Gál | Újpest II | |
| 14 February 2024 | DF | 2 | (Hungary) Zsolt Kollár | Testvériség | |
| 14 February 2024 | DF | 21 | (Hungary) Tamás Petrezselyem | Cegléd | |
| 14 February 2024 | MF | 18 | (Hungary) Barnabás Tóth | Dorog | |

=== Transfers out ===
| Date | Pos. | No. | Player | To | Ref |
|---|---|---|---|---|---|
| – | N/A | 24 | (Hungary) Márton Barna | Released | |
| – | N/A | 18 | (Hungary) László Kincses | Released | |
| 13 July 2023 | FW | 19 | (Hungary) Milán Faragó | XV. Kerületi Issimo | |
| 20 July 2023 | N/A | 3 | (Hungary) Noel Szendrődi | Bánk-Dalnoki Akadémia | |
| 25 July 2023 | N/A | 24 | (Hungary) Ábel Kósa | Magyar Testnevelési Egyetem | |
| 31 July 2023 | N/A | 8 | (Hungary) Krisztián Horváth | Szabadkikötő | |
| 31 July 2023 | DF | 3 | (Hungary) Keve Mezey | Érsekvadkert | |
| 4 August 2023 | N/A | 4 | (Hungary) Gergő Rétvári | Csömör | |
| 7 August 2023 | N/A | 15 | (Hungary) Márk Tréfás | Gázgyár | |
| 8 August 2023 | FW | 5 | (Hungary) Péter Pölöskei II | Szabadkikötő | |
| 8 August 2023 | N/A | 99 | (Hungary) Csaba Török | Róna | |
| 10 August 2023 | N/A | 20 | (Hungary) Soma Major | Testvériség | |
| 16 August 2023 | N/A | 2 | (Hungary) Armand Szőllősi | Palota | |
| 21 August 2023 | DF | 4 | (Hungary) Máté Gulyás | Szokolya | |
| 1 September 2023 | N/A | 1 | (Hungary) Norbert Szaniszló | Csömör | |
| 19 January 2024 | N/A | 77 | (Hungary) Dávid Skripek | Tiszaújváros | |
| 22 January 2024 | N/A | 18 | (Hungary) Ádám Hajzlinszki | Újbuda | |
| 29 January 2024 | GK | 1 | (Hungary) Alex Szalay | Salgótarján | |
| 7 February 2024 | MF | 21 | (Hungary) Dávid Soós | BKV Előre | |
| 13 February 2024 | N/A | 7 | (Hungary) Roland Végh | 43. Sz. Építők | |
| 17 April 2024 | DF | 2 | (Hungary) Zsolt Kollár | Released | |

=== Loans in ===
| Start date | End date | Pos. | No. | Player | From | Ref |

=== Loans out ===
| Start date | End date | Pos. | No. | Player | To | Ref |

== Competitions ==
=== Overview ===
| Competition | First match | Last match | Starting round | Final position | Record | | | | | | | |
| Competition | First match | Last match | Starting round | Final position | Pld | W | D | L | GF | GA | GD | Win % |
|---|---|---|---|---|---|---|---|---|---|---|---|---|
| Nemzeti Bajnokság III | 30 July 2023 | 26 May 2024 | Matchday 1 | 15th | 30 | 7 | 3 | 20 | 34 | 69 | −35 | 23.33 |
| Total | | | | | 30 | 7 | 3 | 20 | 34 | 69 | −35 | 23.33 |

Source: Competitions

=== Nemzeti Bajnokság III ===
==== League table ====
| Pos | Team | Pld | W | D | L | GF | GA | GD | Pts | Promotion or relegation |
|---|---|---|---|---|---|---|---|---|---|---|
| 12 | Hatvan | 30 | 9 | 9 | 12 | 32 | 44 | −12 | 36 | |
| 13 | Diósgyőr II | 30 | 9 | 8 | 13 | 41 | 44 | −3 | 35 | Possible Relegation to Megyei Bajnokság I |
| 14 | Salgótarján (R) | 30 | 8 | 10 | 12 | 36 | 47 | −11 | 34 | Relegation to Megyei Bajnokság I |
| 15 | Rákospalota (R) | 30 | 7 | 3 | 20 | 34 | 69 | −35 | 24 | Relegation to Megyei Bajnokság I |
| 16 | Gyöngyös (R) | 30 | 1 | 5 | 24 | 23 | 81 | −58 | 8 | Relegation to Megyei Bajnokság I |

Updated to match(es) played on 26 May 2024. Source: Hungarian Football Federation
Rules for classification: 1) Points; 2) Matches won; 3) Goal difference; 4) Goals scored; 5) Head-to-head points; 6) Head-to-head goal difference; 7) Fair play ranking; 8) Drawing of lots.
(R) Relegated

==== Results summary ====
| Overall | | | | | | | | Home | | | | | | Away | | | | | |
| Pld | W | D | L | GF | GA | GD | Pts | W | D | L | GF | GA | GD | W | D | L | GF | GA | GD |
|---|---|---|---|---|---|---|---|---|---|---|---|---|---|---|---|---|---|---|---|
| 30 | 7 | 3 | 20 | 34 | 69 | −35 | 24 | 5 | 2 | 8 | 22 | 27 | −5 | 2 | 1 | 12 | 12 | 42 | −30 |

Source: Hungarian Football Federation

==== Results by round ====
| Round | 1 | 2 | 3 | 4 | 5 | 6 | 7 | 8 | 9 | 10 | 11 | 12 | 13 | 14 | 15 | 16 | 17 | 18 | 19 | 20 | 21 | 22 | 23 | 24 | 25 | 26 | 27 | 28 | 29 | 30 |
|---|---|---|---|---|---|---|---|---|---|---|---|---|---|---|---|---|---|---|---|---|---|---|---|---|---|---|---|---|---|---|
| Ground | H | A | A | H | A | H | A | H | A | H | A | H | A | H | A | A | H | H | A | H | A | H | A | H | A | H | A | H | A | H |
| Result | D | W | L | L | W | W | L | L | L | W | L | L | L | W | L | L | W | L | L | D | L | L | L | L | L | L | D | L | L | W |
| Position | 7 | 5 | 10 | 11 | 9 | 6 | 8 | 10 | 11 | 10 | 12 | 12 | 12 | 11 | 12 | 12 | 11 | 12 | 13 | 13 | 13 | 14 | 15 | 15 | 15 | 15 | 15 | 15 | 15 | 15 |
| Points | 1 | 4 | 4 | 4 | 7 | 10 | 10 | 10 | 10 | 13 | 13 | 13 | 13 | 16 | 16 | 16 | 19 | 19 | 19 | 20 | 20 | 20 | 20 | 20 | 20 | 20 | 21 | 21 | 21 | 24 |

Source: Matches
A = Away; H = Home; W = Win; D = Draw; L = Loss

==== Matches ====
| 30 July 2023 1 | Rákospalota | 2–2 | Újpest II | Budapest |
| 17:30 CEST (UTC+2) | M. Csernák (yellow card) 24'; L. Lustyik (yellow card) 59'; M. Markos (yellow card) 76'; M. Tóth 87'; D. Soós 90+2' | Report | Má. Mucsányi 11', 34', (yellow card) 83'; B. Horváth (yellow card) 20'; M. Dékei (yellow card) 55'; G. Varga (yellow card) 58'; Mi. Mucsányi (yellow card) 90+1' | Stadium: Budai II. László Stadion; Referee: Ákos Takács |

| 2 August 2023 2 | Gyöngyös | 1–2 | Rákospalota | Gyöngyös |
| 17:30 CEST (UTC+2) | I. Lakatos 2'; C. Gonda (yellow card) 30'; V. Trombola (yellow card) 42'; A. Krán (yellow card) 79' | Report | Lustyik 41'; Kárász (yellow card) 49'; P. Popgeorgiev 51', (yellow card) 71'; R. Bedő (yellow card) 65'; D. Soós (yellow card) 81' | Stadium: Kömlei Károly Városi Sporttelep; Attendance: 300; Referee: Béla Gábor Vinter |

| 13 August 2023 3 | Kisvárda II | 4–0 | Rákospalota | Kisvárda |
| 11:00 CEST (UTC+2) | Szőr 3'; M. Simon (yellow card) 50'; P. Králik 52'; A. Kozachuk 57'; N. Honchar (yellow card) 65'; Á. Ésik 87' | Report | Kárász (yellow card) 32'; P. Kaszala (yellow card) 39'; G. Nagy (yellow card) 40'; L. Lustyik (yellow card) 89' | Stadium: Várkerti Stadion; Referee: Tamás Tóth |

| 19 August 2023 4 | Rákospalota | 1–2 | Debreceni EAC | Budapest |
| 17:30 CET (UTC+1) | Z. Lakatos 2'; M. Csernák (yellow card) 40'; G. Tóth (yellow card) 60'; Z. Werle (red card) 90+5' | Report | G. B. Papp 4'; S. Tóth 75' | Stadium: Budai II. László Stadion; Referee: János Dobai |

| 30 August 2023 5 | Sényő | 2–4 | Rákospalota | Sényő |
| 17:30 CEST (UTC+2) | V. Kapacina 34' (pen.); M. Orosz (yellow card) 55', (goal) 60'; Szokol (yellow card) 61'; K. Kapacina (yellow card) 90+4' | Report | Z. Lakatos 27'; G. Nagy 62' (pen.); Kárász 68', (yellow card) 90+4'; N. Palaga (yellow card) 70'; D. Skripek (yellow card) 82'; T. Micheller 83' | Stadium: Sényői Sportpálya; Attendance: 151; Referee: Tamás Ujhelyi |

| 3 September 2023 6 | Rákospalota | 2–0 | Tiszafüred | Budapest |
| 16:00 CET (UTC+1) | G. Nagy (yellow card) 18'; Kárász (yellow card) 24'; L. Lustyik (yellow card) 29'; D. Újvári (yellow card) 39'; P. Kaszala 73', (yellow card) 88'; Farkas (not on pitch) (yellow card) 80'; D. Skripek 90+4' | Report | N. Dankó (yellow card) 5'; M. Erdei (yellow card) 44' | Stadium: Budai II. László Stadion; Attendance: 200; Referee: András Barnabás Varga |

| 9 September 2023 7 | Diósgyőr II | 4–1 | Rákospalota | Diósgyőr |
| 11:00 CEST (UTC+2) | Jurek 10', 29', (yellow card) 62'; G. Csatári 55', (yellow card) 90'; Fekete 76'; B. Bacsa (yellow card) 82' | Report | Z. Lakatos (yellow card) 39'; D. Skripek 42'; C. Lakatos (yellow card) 89' | Stadium: DVTK Edzőközpont; Attendance: 100; Referee: Csaba Sándor |

| 24 September 2023 8 | Rákospalota | 0–2 | Putnok | Budapest |
| 16:00 CET (UTC+1) | D. Skripek (yellow card) 30'; N. Palaga (yellow card) 71'; C. Lakatos (yellow card) 73' | Report | A. Bökönyi (yellow card) 29'; Nemes 45', (yellow card) 79'; D. Arday (yellow card) 61'; D. Juhos (yellow card) 63'; G. Boros 89' | Stadium: Budai II. László Stadion; Attendance: 200; Referee: Bálint Juhász |

| 1 October 2023 9 | Cigánd | 3–0 | Rákospalota | Cigánd |
| 15:00 CEST (UTC+2) | G. Kelemen (yellow card) 28', (goal) 60'; Z. Horváth (yellow card) 70'; Z. Pap 75'; M. Silling 83' | Report | L. Lustyik (yellow card) 19'; N. Palaga (yellow card) 28'; Kárász (yellow card) 41'; D. Skripek (yellow card) 43'; D. Soós (yellow card) 61'; G. Nagy (yellow card) 90' | Stadium: Cigándi Sportpálya; Attendance: 300; Referee: Sándor Szilágyi |

| 8 October 2023 10 | Rákospalota | 1–0 | Eger | Budapest |
| 15:00 CET (UTC+1) | D. Soós (yellow card) 26'; G. Tóth (yellow card) 30', (goal) 63' | Report | P. Balázs (yellow card) 36'; Géringer (yellow card) 47'; M. Dulló (yellow card) 63' | Stadium: Budai II. László Stadion; Referee: Szabolcs Kakuk |

| 15 October 2023 11 | Debreceni VSC II | 4–0 | Rákospalota | Debrecen |
| 13:00 CEST (UTC+2) | D. Nwachukwu 28'; Majdevac 51'; B. Gellén 71'; Tuboly (yellow card) 74'; Bévárdi 83' | Report | G. Nagy (yellow card) 38'; Kárász (yellow card) 40'; C. Lakatos (yellow card) 58'; D. Újvári (yellow card) 67' | Stadium: Dóczy József utcai Sportpálya; Attendance: 200; Referee: Tamás Ujhelyi |

| 22 October 2023 12 | Rákospalota | 1–5 | Tiszaújváros | Budapest |
| 13:00 CEST (UTC+2) | Z. Lakatos (yellow card) 23'; P. Kaszala (yellow card) 38'; D. Soós (yellow card) 47'; C. Lakatos (yellow card) 63'; R. Bedő 82' | Report | Bo. Tóth 2', 14', 23'; B. Oláh (yellow card) 22'; R. Bedő 31' (o.g.); D. Nagy 55', (yellow card) 59' | Stadium: Budai II. László Stadion; Attendance: 200; Referee: Ákos Takács |

| 29 October 2023 13 | Karcag | 3–0 | Rákospalota | Tiszafüred |
| 13:00 CET (UTC+1) | P. Gránicz 30' (pen.), 42'; D. Antić 40'; R. Karmacsi (yellow card) 46'; N. Nikić (yellow card) 56' | Report | Kárász (yellow card) 17'; V. Mészáros (yellow card) 51' | Stadium: Lipcsey Elemér Sporttelep; Attendance: 400; Referee: Simon Péter Szántó |

| 5 November 2023 14 | Rákospalota | 2–1 | Salgótarján | Budapest |
| 13:00 CET (UTC+1) | D. Skripek 17', (yellow card) 55'; V. Mészáros (yellow card) 29'; M. Tóth 47'; D. Újvári (yellow card) 58'; G. Tóth (yellow card) 83'; D. Soós (yellow card) 85'; C. Lakatos (yellow card) 90+1' | Report | R. Petrechko (yellow card) 30'; V. Palkovics 51'; M. Horváth (yellow card) 53'; K. Csuka (yellow card) 55' | Stadium: Budai II. László Stadion; Attendance: 130; Referee: Szabolcs Kakuk |

| 12 November 2023 15 | Hatvan | 2–0 | Rákospalota | Hatvan |
| 13:00 CET (UTC+1) | D. Benkó 53'; Kárász 66' (o.g.) | Report | | Stadium: Népkert Sporttelep; Attendance: 250; Referee: János Dobai |

| 18 November 2023 16 | Újpest II | 3–0 | Rákospalota | Budapest |
| 11:00 CET (UTC+1) | M. Dékei 7'; Radošević 28'; B. Simon 35'; Á. Tóth (yellow card) 90' | Report | Kárász (yellow card) 67' | Stadium: Újpest Labdarúgó Sportcentruma; Referee: Tamás Kreitl |

| 26 November 2023 17 | Rákospalota | 3–1 | Gyöngyös | Budapest |
| 13:00 CET (UTC+1) | G. Nagy (yellow card) 21', (goal) 54' (pen.); M. Markos 25', 56', (yellow card) 30'; D. Skripek (yellow card) 44'; D. Soós (yellow card) 73' | Report | V. Trombola 31', (yellow card) 33' | Stadium: Budai II. László Stadion; Attendance: 150; Referee: Olivér Dombi |

| 3 March 2024 18 | Rákospalota | 1–3 | Kisvárda II | Budapest |
| 14:00 CET (UTC+1) | L. Lustyik 31', (yellow card) 40'; C. Lakatos (red card) 42'; Farkas (not on pitch) (yellow card) 70'; D. Csúri (red card) 86'; V. Mészáros (yellow card) 90+3' | Report | M. Osztrovka (yellow card) 8'; D. Pongó-Dankai 15', (yellow card) 79'; A. Kozachuk (yellow card) 60', (goal) 87' (pen.); K. Syrota (yellow card) 90+4'; Á. Ésik 90+7' | Stadium: Budai II. László Stadion; Referee: Simon Péter Szántó |

| 10 March 2024 19 | Debreceni EAC | 2–1 | Rákospalota | Debrecen |
| 14:00 CET (UTC+1) | Sándor Jr. (yellow card) 55'; A. Herczku 57'; D. Tóth 77' | Report | Kárász (yellow card) 5'; Z. Lakatos (yellow card) 47'; M. Csernák (red card) 53'; R. Bedő (yellow card) 62'; T. Micheller (yellow card) 79'; M. Tóth 89' | Stadium: Dóczy József utcai Sportpálya; Referee: Dávid Hajdú |

| 17 March 2024 20 | Rákospalota | 1–1 | Sényő | Budapest |
| 14:00 CET (UTC+1) | V. Mészáros (yellow card) 57'; D. Újvári (red card) 61'; Z. Lakatos (yellow card) 70'; G. Tóth 78', (yellow card) 90+1'; M. Tóth (yellow card) 90+4' | Report | M. Orosz (yellow card) 4'; V. Szopkó (yellow card) 37'; Szokol 71', (yellow card) 90+4' | Stadium: Budai II. László Stadion; Attendance: 523; Referee: Barnabás Drabon |

| 24 March 2024 21 | Tiszafüred | 3–2 | Rákospalota | Tiszafüred |
| 14:00 CET (UTC+1) | Á. Bernáth 3'; S. Kovalecz (yellow card) 45'; V. Pataki 56'; M. Aranyos (yellow card) 60'; Iharoš 73', (yellow card) 87' | Report | Kárász 16', (yellow card) 83'; G. Nagy 27'; Z. Lakatos (yellow card) 89' | Stadium: Lipcsey Elemér Sporttelep; Attendance: 300; Referee: Tamás Tóth |

| 31 March 2024 22 | Rákospalota | 0–2 | Diósgyőr II | Budapest |
| 14:00 CEST (UTC+2) | | Report | B. Ferencsik (yellow card) 30'; L. Balázsi 56'; Y. Leshchynskyi 66'; M. Demeter (yellow card) 73' | Stadium: Budai II. László Stadion; Attendance: 150; Referee: Patrik Horváth |

| 7 April 2024 23 | Putnok | 4–0 | Rákospalota | Putnok |
| 16:00 CEST (UTC+2) | Korbély 22', 55'; M. Vattay (yellow card) 27'; J. Dobrovolszki (yellow card) 39'; G. Boros 40'; P. Mrva 88' | Report | D. Csúri (yellow card) 25'; M. Markos (yellow card) 33' | Stadium: Várady Béla Sportközpont; Attendance: 300; Referee: Ákos Takács |

| 14 April 2024 24 | Rákospalota | 1–2 | Cigánd | Budapest |
| 14:00 CEST (UTC+2) | L. Lustyik 45+1', (yellow card) 88'; G. Nagy (yellow card) 81'; Á. Csákány (yellow card) 90+1' | Report | Z. Horváth 1'; N. Honchar 30'; M. Tóth (yellow card) 78' | Stadium: Budai II. László Stadion; Attendance: 150; Referee: Patrik Fehérvári |

| 21 April 2024 25 | Eger | 2–0 | Rákospalota | Eger |
| 17:00 CEST (UTC+2) | P. Balázs (yellow card) 52'; M. Sós 70', 77' | Report | G. Nagy (yellow card) 62'; D. Újvári (yellow card) 76'; P. Kaszala (yellow card) 79' | Stadium: Szentmarjay Tibor Városi Stadion; Attendance: 100; Referee: Patrik Horváth |

| 28 April 2024 26 | Rákospalota | 2–3 | Debreceni VSC II | Budapest |
| 15:00 CEST (UTC+2) | P. Kaszala (yellow card) 29'; L. Lustyik 65'; D. Újvári (yellow card) 82'; Kárász 84' | Report | S. Sipos 30'; C. Hornyák (yellow card) 38'; Z. Doktor 49'; B. Kozma 57'; M. Kovács (yellow card) 58' | Stadium: Budai II. László Stadion; Attendance: 200; Referee: Mihály Török |

| 5 May 2024 27 | Tiszaújváros | 1–1 | Rákospalota | Tiszaújváros |
| 17:00 CEST (UTC+2) | P. Ivánka (yellow card) 31'; L. Géringer (yellow card) 36'; D. Skripek 54' (pen.); N. Cseh (red card) 68'; M. Farkas (yellow card) 88' | Report | Z. Werle 33'; Á. Csákány (yellow card) 38'; Kárász (yellow card) 43' | Stadium: Tiszaújváros Sportcentrum; Attendance: 150; Referee: Csaba Sándor |

| 12 May 2024 28 | Rákospalota | 2–3 | Karcag | Budapest |
| 15:00 CEST (UTC+2) | Z. Werle (yellow card) 41'; G. Tóth 52'; Ba. Tóth 65'; P. Kaszala (yellow card) 75'; Kárász (yellow card) 86' | Report | T. Csala 11'; M. Erdei 75'; Andrić (yellow card) 83'; N. Csiki (yellow card) 86'; D. Székely 90+3' | Stadium: Budai II. László Stadion; Attendance: 200; Referee: Zoltán Maml |

| 19 May 2024 29 | Salgótarján | 4–1 | Rákospalota | Salgótarján |
| 17:00 CEST (UTC+2) | B. Filkor 13' (pen.); K. Csuka (yellow card) 31'; A. Boros 43'; L. Klajban 59'; T. Molnár (yellow card) 62'; M. Horváth 65'; I. Csifó (yellow card) 90' | Report | G. Tóth 31'; B. Gál (yellow card) 42'; T. Szikora (yellow card) 87' | Stadium: Szojka Ferenc Stadion; Attendance: 420; Referee: Patrik Horváth |

| 26 May 2024 30 | Rákospalota | 3–0 | Hatvan | Budapest |
| 17:00 CEST (UTC+2) | Á. Csákány (yellow card) 22'; B. Gál 59'; T. Micheller 63'; G. Nagy (yellow card) 69'; D. Csúri 90+1' | Report | K. Dinka (yellow card) 87' | Stadium: Budai II. László Stadion; Referee: András Barnabás Virág |

== Statistics ==
=== Overall ===
Appearances (Apps) numbers are for appearances in competitive games only, including sub appearances.
Source: Competitions

| No. | Player | Pos. | Nemzeti Bajnokság III | | | |
| No. | Player | Pos. | Apps | Goal | Booked | Sent off (straight red) |
|---|---|---|---|---|---|---|
| 1 | (Hungary) Mirkó Mészáros | GK | 4 | | | |
| 1 | (Hungary) Alex Szalay | GK | 2 | | | |
| 2 | (Hungary) Zsolt Kollár | DF | | | | |
| 3 | (Hungary) Áron Csákány | DF | 8 | | 3 | |
| 4 | (Hungary) Krisztián Kárász | DF | 22 | 3 | 12 | |
| 5 | (Hungary) Marcell Markos | MF | 22 | 2 | 3 | |
| 7 | (Hungary) Dájmond Csúri | DF | 10 | 1 | 1 | 1 |
| 7 | (Hungary) Roland Végh | | 1 | | | |
| 8 | (Hungary) Levente Lustyik | MF | 22 | 4 | 6 | |
| 8 | (Hungary) Ákos Varga | | 3 | | | |
| 9 | (Hungary) Patrik Kaszala | FW | 21 | 1 | 6 | |
| 10 | (Hungary) Tamás Kiss | MF | 1 | | | |
| 10 | (Hungary) Zoltán Lakatos | DF | 26 | 2 | 5 | |
| 11 | (Hungary) Gergő Nagy | DF | 28 | 3 | 8 | |
| 12 | (Hungary) Zalán Werle | MF | 9 | 1 | 1 | 1 |
| 13 | (Hungary) Kálmán Horváth | | 15 | | | |
| 14 | (Hungary) Dominik Újvári | | 19 | | 5 | 1 |
| 16 | (Hungary) Martin Csernák | MF | 18 | | 2 | 1 |
| 16 | (Hungary) Tamás Szikora | | 3 | | 1 | |
| 17 | (Hungary) Tamás Micheller | | 20 | 2 | 1 | |
| 18 | (Hungary) Ádám Hajzlinszki | | 1 | | | |
| 18 | (Hungary) Pantelis Popgeorgiev | FW | 2 | 1 | 1 | |
| 18 | (Hungary) Barnabás Tóth | MF | 9 | 1 | | |
| 20 | (Hungary) Barnabás Gál | FW | 10 | 1 | 1 | |
| 21 | (Hungary) Dávid Soós | MF | 13 | 1 | 6 | |
| 21 | (Hungary) Márk Tóth | | 23 | 3 | 1 | |
| 21 | (Hungary) Milán Vajda | | 7 | | | |
| 22 | (Hungary) Zoltán Dulka | GK | 24 | | | |
| 22 | (Hungary) Martin Lipcsei | GK | 1 | | | |
| 23 | (Hungary) Csaba Lakatos | DF | 14 | | 5 | 1 |
| 23 | (Hungary) György Tóth | FW | 25 | 4 | 4 | |
| 26 | (Hungary) László Varga | | 2 | | | |
| 37 | (Hungary) Roland Bedő | MF | 25 | 1 | 2 | |
| 69 | (Hungary) Benedek Barcsai | | 2 | | | |
| 69 | (Hungary) Noel Palaga | | 14 | | 3 | |
| 69 | (Hungary) Tamás Petrezselyem | DF | 3 | | | |
| 69 | (Hungary) Ádám Uhercsák | | 2 | | | |
| 77 | (Hungary) László Csitári | MF | 2 | | | |
| 77 | (Hungary) Viktor Mészáros | DF | 21 | | 4 | |
| 77 | (Hungary) Dávid Skripek | | 16 | 3 | 5 | |
| Own goals | | | | | | |
| Totals | | | | 34 | 86 | 5 |

=== Clean sheets ===
| | | | Clean sheets |
| No. | Player | Games Played | Nemzeti Bajnokság III |
|---|---|---|---|
| 22 | (Hungary) Zoltán Dulka | 24 | 2 |
| 1 | (Hungary) Mirkó Mészáros | 4 | 1 |
| 22 | (Hungary) Martin Lipcsei | 1 | 1 |
| 1 | (Hungary) Alex Szalay | 2 | 0 |
| Totals | | | 4 |
