= Zsolt Huszárik =

Hungarian footballer

Personal information
- Full name: Zsolt Huszárik
- Date of birth: August 4, 1989 (age 37)
- Place of birth: Szeged, Hungary
- Height: 1.78 m (5 ft 10 in)
- Position: Midfielder

Team information
- Current team: BKV Előre

Youth career
- 2002–2004: Tisza Volán SC
- 2004–2005: Algyői SK
- 2005–2007: MTK Budapest

Senior career*
Years	Team	Apps	(Gls)
2007–2008	Makó	3	(0)
2007	→ Tompai SE (loan)	24	(1)
2008–2011	MTK Budapest	0	(0)
2008–2011	→ Tisza Volán SC (loan)	67	(11)
2011	Kisteleki TE	6	(0)
2011–2012	FC Zell am See	15	(4)
2012	Vasas	3	(0)
2012–2013	REAC		
2013	FC Zell am See	13	(2)
2013–2014	USC Mank		
2014–2015	FC Gratkorn	40	(1)
2015–2016	SZEOL		
2016	Dunaújváros	14	(1)
2016–2017	Tatabánya	14	(0)
2017	Komárom	16	(2)
2017–2018	MTE 1904	19	(0)
2018–2019	III. Kerületi	13	(0)
2019	REAC	14	(1)
2019–	BKV Előre	13	(1)
- * Club domestic league appearances and goals as of 13:14, 2 December 2019 (UTC)

Zsolt Huszárik (born 4 August 1989 in Szeged) is a professional Hungarian footballer currently plays for BKV Előre SC.

== Career ==
In the summer 2013, Huszárik joined Austrian club USC Mank. He played there until January 2014, where he joined another Austrian club, FC Gratkorn.
