= Balázs Dinka =

Hungarian footballer (born 1976)

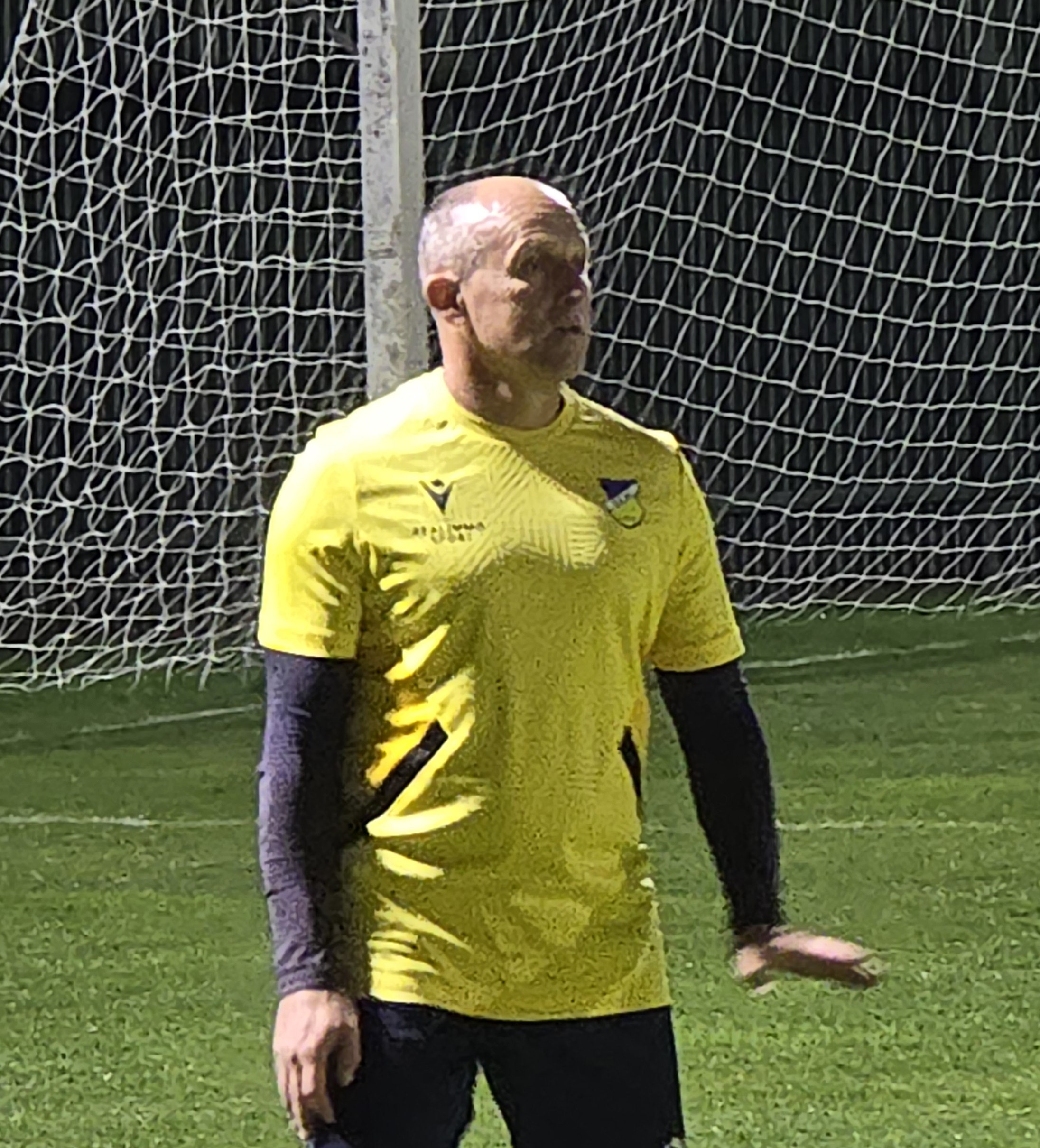
- Dinka playing for Rákospalota Old Boys in 2026

Personal information
- Date of birth: 3 November 1976 (age 49)
- Place of birth: Vác, Hungary
- Height: 1.76 m (5 ft 9 in)
- Position: Defender

Team information
- Current team: Rákospalota (assistant)

Youth career
- 1988–1995: Vasas
- 1995–1996: Újpesti Flottilla

Senior career*
Years	Team	Apps	(Gls)
1997	Monor	14	(1)
1997–2000	Dunakeszi	82	(0)
2000–2016	Rákospalota	331	(1)
2008	Rákospalota II	1	(0)
Total		428	(2)

Managerial career
- 2015–2017: Rákospalota
- 2019–2022: Rákospalota
- 2023: Rákospalota (caretaker)
- 2023: Rákospalota (caretaker)
- 2024: Rákospalota (interim)
- * Club domestic league appearances and goals

Balázs Dinka (born 3 November 1976) is a Hungarian football manager and former professional player who is currently the assistant manager for Megyei Bajnokság I club Rákospalota.

== Club career ==
=== Dunakeszi ===
On 16 May 1999, Dinka won the third division title with Dunakeszi following a 0–0 away draw against Gyula.

Together with six other players, they agreed with the club that they could transfer to any team for free in exchange for the non-payment of their salaries.

=== Rákospalota ===
Tiszaújváros were reported to be interested in signing Dinka, but he eventually signed for Nemzeti Bajnokság II club Rákospalota in mid-2000.

He made his Nemzeti Bajnokság I debut for REAC on 29 October 2005, replacing Csaba Földvári in the 52nd minute of a 1–0 home win against Sopron, which was also the first match won by the club in the top division.

On 22 August 2007, he scored his first goal for the club in a 5–1 Ligakupa home win against Kaposvár. Dinka scored his first and only goal in a league match for REAC in a 3–2 home Nemzeti Bajnokság II loss against Szolnok on 13 June 2010.

== Managerial career ==
=== Rákospalota ===
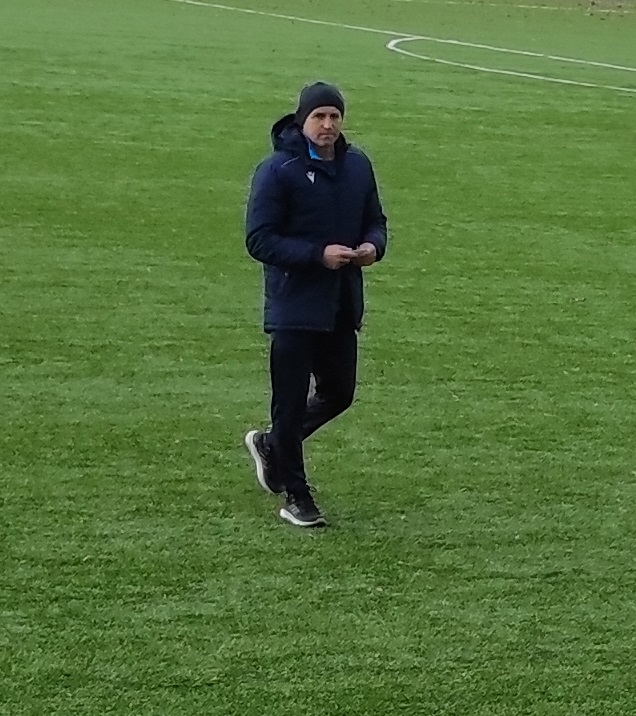
Dinka in 2024

On 16 October 2015, Dinka started to manage Rákospalota in the Nemzeti Bajnokság III, with the goal to avoid relegation. Following the appointment of László Balogh ahead of the 2017–18 season, he stayed at REAC as a youth coach.

In 2024, Dinka was promoted from assistant to interim manager, following the sacking of Zsolt Kollár. He was replaced by Zoltán Molnár ahead of the 2024–25 season and became assistant again.

== Personal life ==
Dinka was awarded the Rákospalota–Pestújhely–Újpalota Medal of Merit for the first time as an athlete by the local government of the 15th district of Budapest.

== Career statistics ==
Appearances and goals by club, season and competition
Club	Season	League			Magyar Kupa		Ligakupa		Other		Total	
Club	Season	Division	Apps	Goals	Apps	Goals	Apps	Goals	Apps	Goals	Apps	Goals
Monor	1996–97	Nemzeti Bajnokság III	14	1	—		—		—		14	1
Dunakeszi	1997–98	Nemzeti Bajnokság III	23	0	3	0	—		—		26	0
Dunakeszi	1998–99	Nemzeti Bajnokság III	28	0	4	0	—		—		32	0
Dunakeszi	1999–2000	Nemzeti Bajnokság II	31	0	—		—		—		31	0
Dunakeszi	Total		82	0	7	0	—		—		89	0
Rákospalota	2000–01	Nemzeti Bajnokság II	34	0	—		—		—		34	0
Rákospalota	2001–02	Nemzeti Bajnokság II	28	0	3	0	—		—		31	0
Rákospalota	2002–03	Nemzeti Bajnokság II	35	0	1	0	—		—		36	0
Rákospalota	2003–04	Nemzeti Bajnokság II	24	0	1	0	—		1 (Note: Appearance in Nemzeti Bajnokság I promotion play-offs)	0	26	0
Rákospalota	2004–05	Nemzeti Bajnokság II	20	0	—		—		—		20	0
Rákospalota	2005–06	Nemzeti Bajnokság I	13	0	3	0	—		—		16	0
Rákospalota	2006–07	Nemzeti Bajnokság I	24	0	3	0	—		—		27	0
Rákospalota	2007–08	Nemzeti Bajnokság I	21	0	2	0	9	1	—		32	1
Rákospalota	2008–09	Nemzeti Bajnokság I	12	0	2	0	3	0	—		17	0
Rákospalota	2009–10	Nemzeti Bajnokság II	18	1	2	0	—		—		20	1
Rákospalota	2010–11	Nemzeti Bajnokság II	21	0	3	0	—		—		24	0
Rákospalota	2011–12	Nemzeti Bajnokság II	18	0	1	0	—		—		19	0
Rákospalota	2012–13	Nemzeti Bajnokság III	25	0	3	0	—		1 (Note: Appearance in Nemzeti Bajnokság III relegation play-offs)	0	29	0
Rákospalota	2013–14	Nemzeti Bajnokság III	26	0	—		—		—		26	0
Rákospalota	2014–15	Nemzeti Bajnokság III	8	0	0	0	—		—		8	0
Rákospalota	2015–16	Nemzeti Bajnokság III	4	0	—		—		—		4	0
Rákospalota	Total		331	1	24	0	12	1	2	0	369	2
Rákospalota II	2007–08	Nemzeti Bajnokság III	1	0	—		—		—		1	0
Career total			428	2	31	0	12	1	2	0	473	3

== Managerial statistics ==
Managerial record by team and tenure
Team	From	To	Record								Ref
Team	From	To	P	W	D	L	GF	GA	GD	Win %	Ref
Rákospalota	16 October 2015	20 July 2017	59	19	9	31	77	105	−28	32.20	
Rákospalota	4 June 2019	2022	91	55	19	17	226	95	+131	60.44	
Rákospalota (caretaker)	March 2023	March 2023	2	2	0	0	3	0	+3	100.00	
Rákospalota (caretaker)	August 2023	September 2023	1	1	0	0	4	2	+2	100.00	
Rákospalota (interim)	17 April 2024	2024	6	1	1	4	9	13	−4	16.67	
Total			159	78	29	52	319	215	+104	49.06	

== Honours ==
=== Player ===
Dunakeszi

- Nemzeti Bajnokság III – East: 1998–99

=== Decorations ===
- Rákospalota–Pestújhely–Újpalota Medal of Merit: 2015
