= János Farkas (footballer, born 1984) =

Hungarian footballer

Personal information
- Full name: János Farkas
- Date of birth: 1 January 1984 (age 42)
- Place of birth: Jászberény, Hungary
- Height: 1.80 m (5 ft 11 in)
- Position: Forward

Team information
- Current team: SV Loipersbach
- Number: 10

Youth career
- 2002–2004: Kun FC

Senior career*
Years	Team	Apps	(Gls)
2004–2006	Budakalász	53	(23)
2006–2009	Felcsút	25	(6)
2007–2009	→ Budaörs (loan)	56	(23)
2009–2011	Tatabánya	45	(26)
2011–2012	Siófok	3	(0)
2011–2012	→ Tatabánya (loan)	25	(14)
2012–2013	Sopron	8	(2)
2013	Mezőkövesd	2	(0)
2013–2014	Rákospalota	16	(4)
2014–2015	Jászberény	40	(33)
2015–2017	Kazincbarcika	62	(51)
2017–2018	Cegléd	10	(1)
2018–2019	Jászberény	40	(26)
2019–2020	SV Loipersbach	15	(11)
2020	Tiszafüred	3	(2)
2020–	SV Loipersbach	7	(9)
- * Club domestic league appearances and goals as of 18:06, 24 March 2021 (UTC)

János Farkas (born 1 January 1984) is a Hungarian football player who currently plays for SV Loipersbach.
