= Budai II. László Stadion =

Multi-use stadium in Budapest, Hungary

Coordinates: 47°33′43″N 19°07′17″E

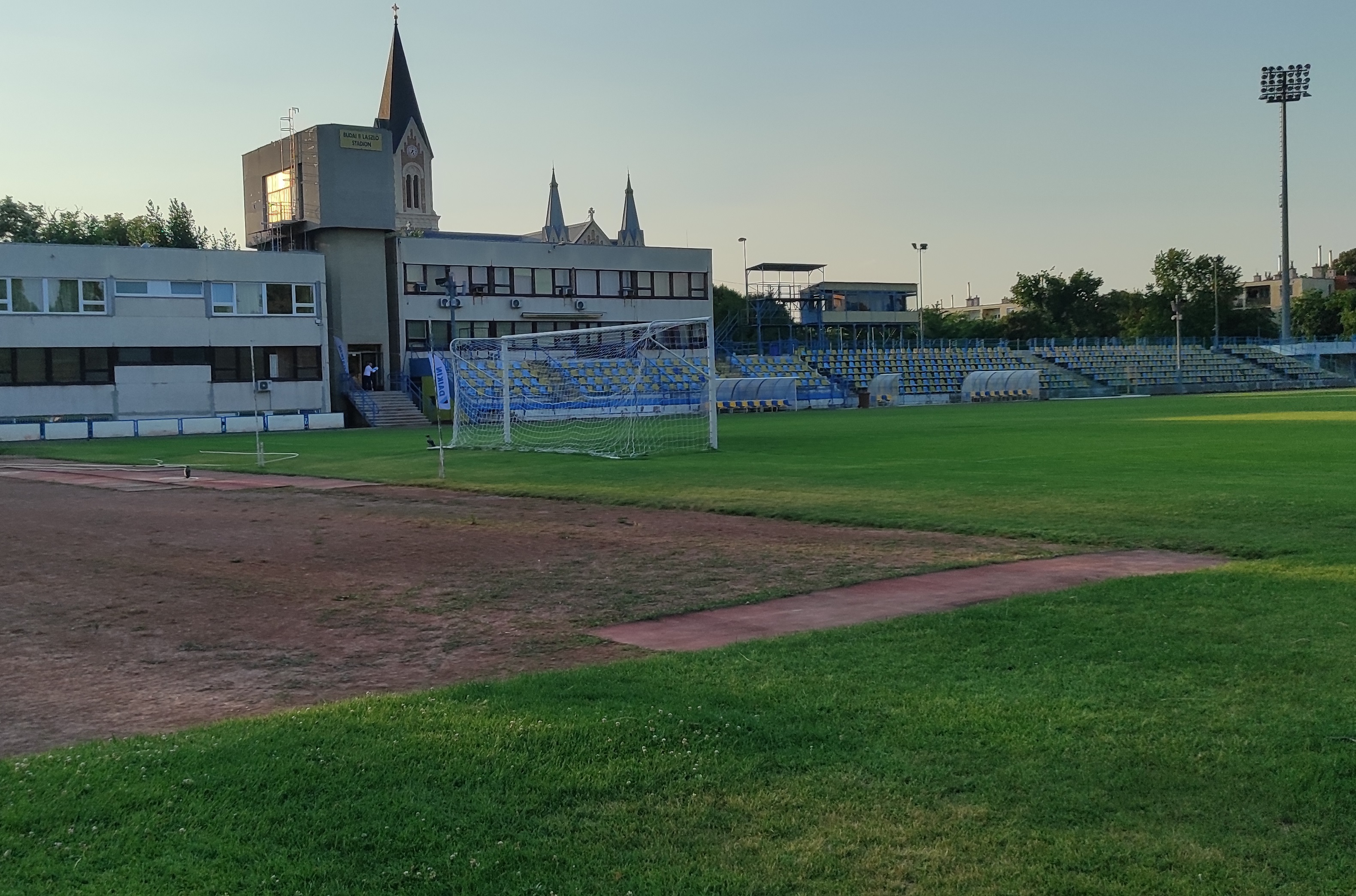
- Interactive map of Budai II. László Stadion
- Full name: Budai II. László Stadion
- Location: Budapest, Hungary
- Owner: Rákospalotai EAC
- Capacity: 10,000
- Surface: Grass; Field
- Record attendance: 15,000 (Volán v Újpest, 1 March 1981)
- Field size: 105 m × 68 m (344 ft × 223 ft)

Tenants
- Volán (1977–1991); Rákospalota

Budai II. László Stadion is a multi-use stadium in Budapest, Hungary. It is currently used mostly for football matches and is the home stadium of Rákospalotai EAC and 1. FC Femina. The stadium was named after Rákospalota-born Hungarian footballer, László Budai. The stadium is able to hold 10,000 people.

== Photo gallery ==
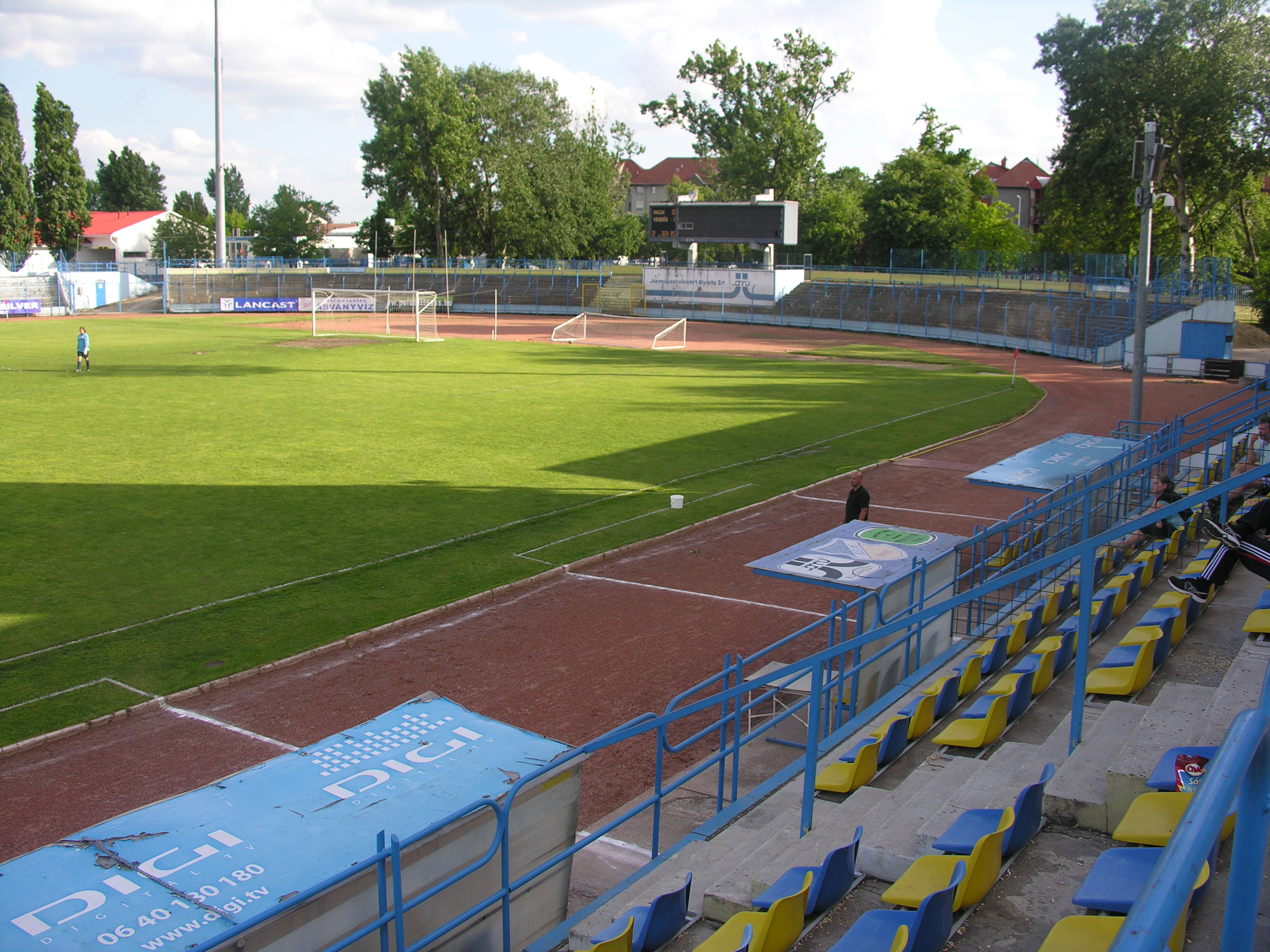
Interior

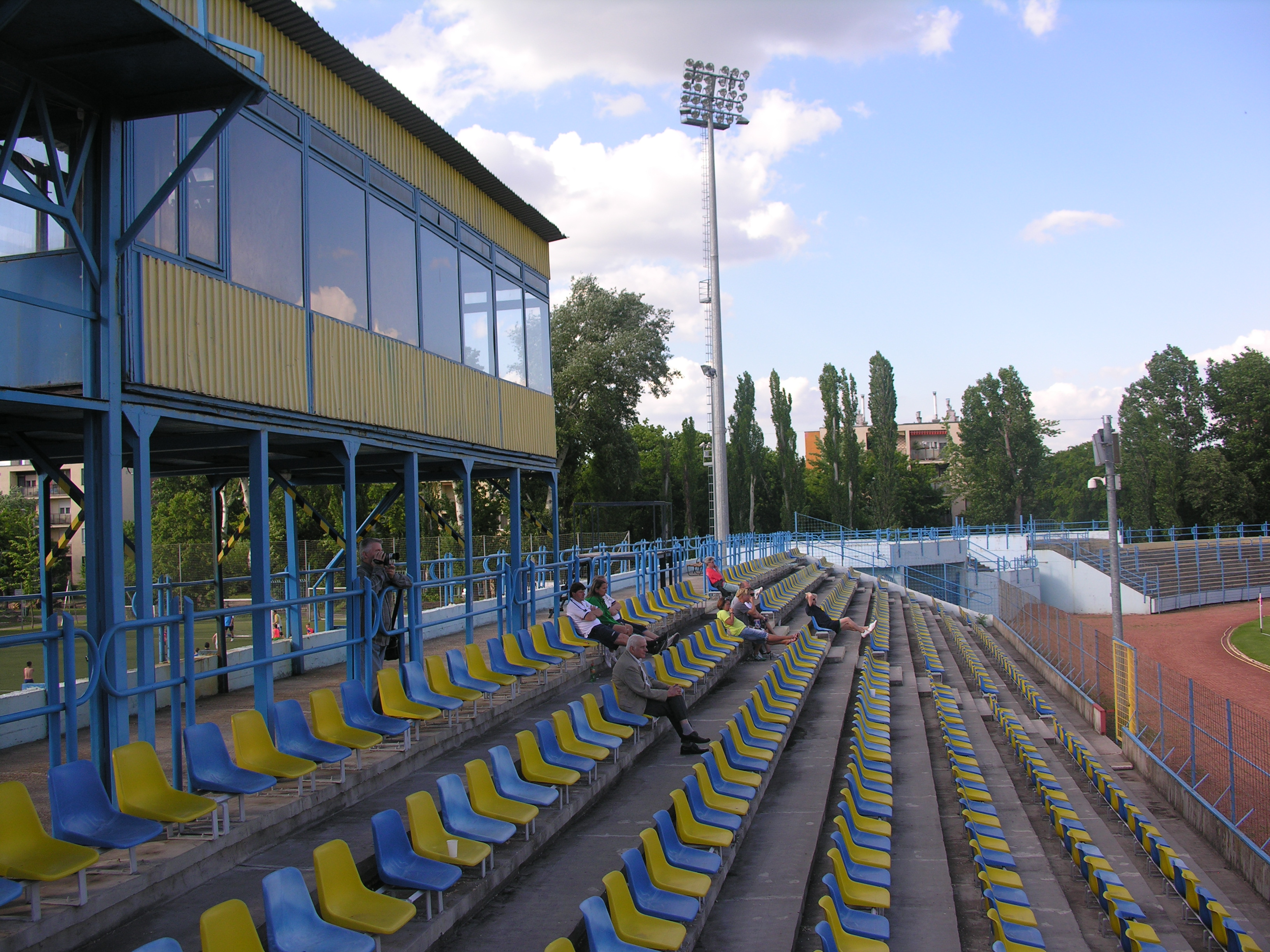
Interior

== See also ==
- List of Nemzeti Bajnoksag I stadiums
