= Testvériség SE =

Hungarian football club

- Full name: Testvériség Sport Egyesület
- Founded: 1909
- Ground: Barátság Sporttelep
- Capacity: 5,000 (500 seated)
- League: BLSZ I
- Website: https://www.testverisegse.hu/
Home colours

Testvériség Sport Egyesület is a Hungarian football club from the town of Rákospalota, Budapest, Hungary.

== History ==
Testvériség Sport Egyesület debuted in the 1946–47 season of the Hungarian League and finished fifteenth.

On 27 January 2024, Flórián Urbán was appointed as the manager of the club.

On 14 September 2024, they were eliminated by Tatabányai SC from the 2024–25 Magyar Kupa season. The match ended with a 2-0 defeat.

== Name Changes ==
- 1909–1949: Testvériség Sport Egyesület
- 1949–1951: Rákospalotai Vasutas SK
- 1951–1954: Rákospalotai Lokomotív SK
- 1954–1957: Rákospalotai Törekvés
- 1957–present: Testvériség Sport Egyesület

== Honours ==
- Nemzeti Bajnokság II:
  - Winners (1): 1918–19

== Seasons ==
The table below shows the seasons of Testvériség SE.

Season	Tier	Club's name	Position	Pts
1910–11	3	Testvériség SE	9 / 11	16
1911–12	3	Testvériség SE	3 / 12	29
1912–13	3	Testvériség SE	2 / 12	33
1913–14	3	Testvériség SE	3 / 13	33
1915	2	Testvériség SE	6 / 12	12
1915	2	Testvériség SE	6 / 12	11
1916	2	Testvériség SE	1 / 8	8
1916–17	2	Testvériség SE	3 / 12	25
1917–18	2	Testvériség SE	2 / 12	30
1918–19	2	Testvériség SE	1 / 12	34
1919–20	2	Testvériség SE	2 / 17	49
1920–21	2	Testvériség SE	7 / 14	28
1921–22	3	Testvériség SE	2 / 15	40
1922–23	2	Testvériség SE	11 / 15	24
1923–24	2	Testvériség SE	13 / 14	19
1924–25	3	Testvériség SE	2 / 14	39
1925–26	2	Testvériség SE	5 / 14	29
1926–27	2	Testvériség SE	4 / 17	44
1927–28	2	Testvériség SE	1 / 14	36
1928–29	2	Testvériség SE	4 / 10	22
1929–30	2	Testvériség SE	13 / 14	21
1930–31	3	Testvériség SE	2 / 14	37
1931–32	3	Testvériség SE	3 / 14	33
1932–33	3	Testvériség SE	5 / 14	28
1933–34	2	Testvériség SE	10 / 12	14
1934–35	2	Testvériség SE	10 / 12	18
1935–36	2	Testvériség SE	8 / 13	22
1936–37	2	Testvériség SE	9 / 13	22
1937–38	2	Testvériség SE	13 / 14	14
1938–39	3	Testvériség SE	11 / 15	25
1939–40	3	Testvériség SE	2 / 13	37
1940–41	3	Testvériség SE	3 / 12	31
1941–42	2	Testvériség SE	9 / 14	25
1942–43	2	Testvériség SE	6 / 12	22
1943–44	2	Testvériség	10 / 14	24
1944–45	2	Testvériség SE	5 / 16	9
1944–45	2	Testvériség SE	0 / 12	
1945	2	Testvériség SE	7 / 12	23
1945–46	2	Testvériség SE	1 / 14	35
1946–47	1	Testvériség SE	16 / 16	3
1947–48	2	Testvériség SE	13 / 13	13
1948–49	3	Testvériség SE	14 / 18	20
1949–50	3	Rákospalotai Vasutas SK	14 / 16	20
1950	3	Rákospalotai VSK	16 / 16	5
1951	3	Rákospalotai Lokomotív	12 / 12	14
1952	3	Rákospalotai Lokomotív	8 / 14	26
1953	3	Rákospalotai Lokomotív	4 / 16	38
1954	3	Rákospalotai Lokomotív	12 / 16	22
1955	3	Rákospalotai Törekvés	12 / 16	22
1956	3	Rákospalotai Törekvés	12 / 14	20
1957	3	Testvériség SE	5 / 8	14
1957–58	4	Testvériség SE	7 / 20	46
1958–59	4	Testvériség SE	1 / 16	48
1959–60	3	Testvériség SE	13 / 16	26
1960–61	4	Testvériség SE	3 / 16	42
1961–62	4	Testvériség SE	2 / 16	41
1962–63	4	Testvériség SE	6 / 16	33
1963	5	Testvériség SE	1 / 16	25
1964	5	Testvériség SE	2 / 16	46
1965	5	Testvériség SE	1 / 14	38
1966	4	Testvériség SE	15 / 16	24
1967	4	Testvériség SE	16 / 16	13
1968	5	Testvériség SE	17 / 18	20
1969	6	Testvériség SE	5 / 16	36
1970	6	Testvériség SE	1 / 16	22
1970–71	6	Testvériség SE	9 / 16	27
1971–72	6	Testvériség SE	3 / 16	45
1972–73	6	Testvériség SE	7 / 16	30
1973–74	6	Testvériség SE	4 / 15	33
1974–75	6	Testvériség SE	0 / 16	
1977–78	6	Testvériség SE	1 / 16	51
1978–79	4	Testvériség SE	5 / 16	29
1979–80	4	Testvériség SE	14 / 16	21
1980–81	5	Testvériség SE	5 / 15	30
1981–82	6	Testvériség SE	5 / 16	34
1983–84	5	Testvériség SE	9 / 16	30
1984–85	5	Testvériség SE	9 / 16	29
1985–86	5	Testvériség SE	12 / 16	26
1986–87	5	Testvériség	10 / 16	26
1988–89	5	Testvériség	10 / 16	26
1989–90	5	Testvériség	6 / 16	49
1990–91	5	Testvériség SE	2 / 16	42
1991–92	5	Testvériség SE	4 / 16	38
1992–93	5	Testvériség SE	1 / 16	50
1993–94	4	Testvériség SE	16 / 16	18
1994–95	5	Testvériség SE	2 / 16	67
1995–96	5	Testvériség SE	2 / 16	63
1996–97	4	Testvériség	14 / 16	24
1997–98	6	Testvériség SE	8 / 16	40
1998–99	6	Testvériség SE	4 / 16	57
1999–00	6	Testvériség SE	1 / 16	70
2000–01	5	Testvériség SE	7 / 16	40
2001–02	5	Testvériség SE	14 / 16	26
2002–03	6	Testvériség SE	4 / 16	47
2003–04	6	Testvériség SE	3 / 16	58
2004–05	6	Testvériség SE	4 / 16	58
2005–06	5	Testvériség SE	5 / 16	52
2006–07	5	Testvériség	3 / 16	55
2007–08	5	Testvériség SE	6 / 16	48
2008–09	5	Testvériség SE	13 / 16	34
2009–10	5	Testvériség SE	8 / 16	39
2010–11	5	Testvériség SE	3 / 16	50
2011–12	4	Testvériség SE	16 / 16	17
2012–13	5	Testvériség SE	1 / 16	67
2013–14	4	Testvériség SE	9 / 16	32
2014–15	4	Testvériség SE	11 / 16	34
2015–16	4	Testvériség SE	9 / 16	41
2016–17	4	Testvériség SE	7 / 16	44
2017–18	4	Testvériség SE	9 / 16	41
2018–19	4	Testvériség SE	6 / 16	49
2019–20	4	Testvériség SE	6 / 16	32
2020–21	4	Testvériség-Újpalota SE	7 / 16	46
2021–22	4	Testvériség-Újpalota SE	6 / 16	45
2022–23	4	Testvériség-Újpalota SE	10 / 16	35
2023–24	4	Testvériség-Újpalota SE	6 / 16	46
2024–25	4	Testvériség-Újpalota SE	11 / 16	34
2025–26	4	Testvériség-Újpalota SE	10 / 16	37
