= 2005–06 Rákospalotai EAC season =

Rákospalota
2005–06 season
- Owner: József Forgács
- Chairman: Róbert Kutasi
- Manager: Flórián Urbán
- Stadium: Budai II. László Stadion
- Nemzeti Bajnokság I: 14th
- Magyar Kupa: Round of 16
- Top goalscorer: League: Krisztián Nyerges; Attila Polonkai (7 each); All: Krisztián Nyerges (11)
- Highest home attendance: 5,500 (vs Újpest, 20 August 2005)
- Lowest home attendance: 800 (vs Zalaegerszeg, 3 December 2005)
- Average home league attendance: 2,080
Home colours	Away colours

The 2005–06 season was Rákospalotai Egyetértés Atlétikai Club's or shortly REAC's 59th competitive season, first ever season in the Hungarian top flight and 93rd year in existence as a football club. In addition to the domestic league, Rákospalota participated in this season's editions of the Magyar Kupa.

== First team squad ==
The players listed had league appearances and stayed until the end of the season.

Note: Flags indicate national team as defined under FIFA eligibility rules; some limited exceptions apply. Players may hold more than one non-FIFA nationality.

No.	Pos.	Nation	Player
1	GK	HUN	Balázs Farkas
2	DF	HUN	Balázs Dinka
3	MF	HUN	Csaba Földvári
5	DF	HUN	Balázs Sallai
6	DF	HUN	Gábor Nagy I
7	MF	HUN	Gergő Cseri
8	MF	HUN	Vince Kapcsos
9	DF	HUN	Zoltán Tamási
10	FW	HUN	Gábor Torma
11	FW	HUN	Krisztián Nyerges
12	GK	HUN	Viktor Szentpéteri
13	DF	HUN	Tamás Németh

No.	Pos.	Nation	Player
14	DF	HUN	Balázs Kovács
15	DF	HUN	Tibor Virágh
16	DF	HUN	Tamás Horváth
17	DF	HUN	Gábor Horváth I
18	DF	HUN	Attila Szirtesi
19	FW	HUN	Gábor Nagy II
20	FW	HUN	Tamás Koltai
21	FW	HUN	Sándor Török
22	MF	HUN	Attila Polonkai
23	MF	HUN	Tamás Somorjai
25	FW	HUN	István Csopaki
26	GK	HUN	Tamás Floszmann

== Transfers ==
=== Transfers in ===
Date	Pos.	No.	Player	From	Ref
1 July 2005	DF	13	(Hungary) Tamás Németh	Újpest	
18 January 2006	FW	20	(Hungary) Tamás Koltai	(Germany) Anker Wismar	

=== Transfers out ===
Date	Pos.	No.	Player	To	Ref
25 July 2005	DF		(Hungary) István Gál	(Germany) Anker Wismar	
26 July 2005	FW		(Hungary) József Havrán	Soroksár	
29 July 2005	MF		(Hungary) Csaba Felföldi	Vecsés	
3 August 2005	MF		(Hungary) György Rézmányi	Budakalász	
6 August 2005	MF		(Hungary) Kristóf Bánka	Fót	
1 January 2006	MF		(Hungary) Gábor Boér	(Singapore) Home United	
20 February 2006	DF		(Hungary) Tamás Mihályi	Vecsés	
23 February 2006	FW	4	(Hungary) László Fekete	III. Kerület	

=== Loans in ===
Start date	End date	Pos.	No.	Player	From	Ref

=== Loans out ===
Start date	End date	Pos.	No.	Player	To	Ref

== Friendlies ==
11 February 2006 Friendly	Rákospalota (Hungary)	0–3	(Romania) Bihor Oradea	Tiszaújváros, Hungary
13:00 CET (UTC+1)		Report	Achim 22'; Miculescu 30'; V. Grigore 35'	Stadium: Tiszaújvárosi Sport Park
Note: The game lasted 45 minutes.

== Competitions ==
=== Overview ===
Competition	First match	Last match	Starting round	Final position	Record							
Competition	First match	Last match	Starting round	Final position	Pld	W	D	L	GF	GA	GD	Win %
Nemzeti Bajnokság I	30 July 2005	3 June 2006	Matchday 1	14th	30	7	5	18	30	59	−29	23.33
Magyar Kupa	10 September 2005	12 November 2005	Second round	Round of 16	4	2	2	0	12	6	+6	50.00
Total					34	9	7	18	42	65	−23	26.47

Source: Competitions

=== Nemzeti Bajnokság I ===
==== League table ====
Pos	Team	Pld	W	D	L	GF	GA	GD	Pts	Qualification or relegation
12	Pécs	30	8	9	13	37	41	−4	33	
13	Honvéd	30	8	9	13	33	52	−19	33	
14	Rákospalota	30	7	5	18	30	59	−29	26	
15	Vasas	30	5	10	15	32	47	−15	25	
16	Pápa (R)	30	5	7	18	30	76	−46	22	Relegated to Nemzeti Bajnokság II

Source: RSSSF
(R) Relegated

==== Results summary ====
Overall								Home						Away					
Pld	W	D	L	GF	GA	GD	Pts	W	D	L	GF	GA	GD	W	D	L	GF	GA	GD
30	7	5	18	30	59	−29	26	3	2	10	14	28	−14	4	3	8	16	31	−15

Source: HFF

==== Results by round ====
Round	1	2	3	4	5	6	7	8	9	10	11	12	13	14	15	16	17	18	19	20	21	22	23	24	25	26	27	28	29	30
Ground	H	A	H	H	H	H	A	H	A	H	A	H	A	H	A	A	H	A	A	A	A	H	A	H	A	H	A	H	A	H
Result	L	D	L	L	L	L	L	L	L	W	W	L	W	W	L	L	L	L	D	D	L	D	L	L	W	W	W	D	L	L
Position	12	11	14	16	16	16	16	16	16	15	15	15	14	14	15	15	15	15	15	15	15	15	15	15	15	14	14	14	14	14
Points	0	1	1	1	1	1	1	1	1	4	7	7	10	13	13	13	13	13	14	15	15	16	16	16	19	22	25	26	26	26

Source: Matches
A = Away; H = Home; W = Win; D = Draw; L = Loss

==== Score overview ====
Opposition	Home score	Away score	Aggregate score	Double
Debrecen	1–2	1–6	2–8	No
Diósgyőr	0–2	1–1	1–3	No
Fehérvár	1–2	1–3	2–5	No
Ferencváros	1–0	2–0	3–0	Yes
Győr	1–2	2–2	3–4	No
Honvéd	1–3	3–1	4–4	No
Kaposvár	0–3	0–1	0–4	No
MTK	1–2	0–1	1–3	No
Pápa	2–2	3–1	5–3	No
Pécs	1–1	0–4	1–5	No
Sopron	1–0	1–0	2–0	Yes
Tatabánya	0–2	0–4	0–6	No
Újpest	2–3	0–2	2–5	No
Vasas	0–3	2–2	2–5	No
Zalaegerszeg	2–1	0–3	2–4	No

==== Matches ====
Win Draw Loss Fixtures

30 July 2005 1	Rákospalota	1–2	MTK	Budapest
18:00 CEST (UTC+2)	Török 43'; Kapcsos (yellow card) 53'	Report	J. Kanta 27', (yellow card) 41'; Czvitkovics 74'	Stadium: Budai II. László Stadion; Attendance: 3,000; Referee: József Erdős

6 August 2005 2	Győr	2–2	Rákospalota	Győr
19:00 CEST (UTC+2)	Kenesei (yellow card) 14', (goal) 60'; Makra (yellow card) 42'; Vincze (yellow card) 56'; Bajzát 70'	Report	G. Nagy I (yellow card) 18' (yellow-red card) 49'; Török 28'; Földvári (yellow card) 52'; Cseri (red card) 60'; Polonkai 68'	Stadium: ETO Park; Attendance: 4,000; Referee: Szabolcs Saskőy

20 August 2005 3	Rákospalota	2–3	Újpest	Budapest
17:00 CEST (UTC+2)	Somorjai 44'; Polonkai (yellow card) 45'; Földvári 50'	Report	Z. Kovács I 6', 25'; Vanczák (yellow card) 13' (yellow-red card) 34'; Böjte (yellow card) 18'; Rajczi (yellow card) 43'; Kőhalmi 81'; Vaskó (yellow card) 83'	Stadium: Budai II. László Stadion; Attendance: 5,500; Referee: Attila Dubraviczky

28 August 2005 4	Rákospalota	0–2	Diósgyőr	Budapest
17:00 CEST (UTC+2)	G. Nagy I (yellow card) 19'; Virágh (yellow card) 33'	Report	Tisza (yellow card) 21', (goal) 89'; Kövesfalvi (yellow card) 55'; Mogyorósi (yellow card) 75'; Katona (red card) 80'; F. Horváth 85'	Stadium: Budai II. László Stadion; Attendance: 4,000; Referee: Viktor Kassai

17 September 2005 5	Rákospalota	0–3	Vasas	Budapest
16:00 CEST (UTC+2)	Sallai (yellow card) 20'; Török (yellow card) 26'; B. Kovács (yellow card) 55'; G. Horváth I (yellow card) 56'; G. Nagy I (yellow card) 89'	Report	Salamon 15'; Molnár (yellow card) 31'; Gyánó 51', (yellow card) 75'; Bárányos (red card) 56'; Rósa 89' (pen.)	Stadium: Budai II. László Stadion; Attendance: 2,500; Referee: Attila Hanacsek

24 September 2005 6	Rákospalota	1–2	Fehérvár	Budapest
16:00 CEST (UTC+2)	Virágh (yellow card) 21'; Somorjai 75'; Sallai (yellow card) 82'	Report	Kuttor (yellow card) 25'; Sitku 37', 59'; Tudor (yellow card) 81'	Stadium: Budai II. László Stadion; Attendance: 1,500; Referee: Mihály Fábián

1 October 2005 7	Pécs	4–0	Rákospalota	Pécs
18:00 CEST (UTC+2)	Kulcsár 49'; Tarcsa 52', 76'; Pavičević 90'	Report		Stadium: Stadion PMFC; Attendance: 1,500; Referee: Sándor Gergely

15 October 2005 8	Rákospalota	1–2	Debrecen	Budapest
15:00 CEST (UTC+2)	G. Nagy I (yellow card) 32'; Virágh (yellow card) 45'; Nyerges 68'; T. Németh (yellow card) 75'	Report	Máté (yellow card) 26', (goal) 32'; T. Sándor 62', (yellow card) 70'	Stadium: Budai II. László Stadion; Attendance: 1,500; Referee: Zoltán Szarka

22 October 2005 9	Tatabánya	4–0	Rákospalota	Tatabánya
14:30 CEST (UTC+2)	Márkus 23', 66'; Kerényi (yellow card) 28'; Hajdú (yellow card) 42', (goal) 60'; Rajnay (yellow card) 51'; T. Nagy 74'	Report	Kapcsos (yellow card) 16'	Stadium: Stadion Városi; Attendance: 2,000; Referee: Szabolcs Saskőy

29 October 2005 10	Rákospalota	1–0	Sopron	Budapest
14:30 CEST (UTC+2)	G. Nagy I (yellow card) 43'; Virágh (yellow card) 76'; G. Horváth I (yellow card) 81'; Polonkai (yellow card) 84'; B. Kovács (yellow card) 87'; Nyerges 90' (pen.)	Report	Coțan (yellow card) 41'; Landerl (yellow card) 46'	Stadium: Budai II. László Stadion; Attendance: 1,000; Referee: János Makai Jr.

5 November 2005 11	Ferencváros	0–2	Rákospalota	Budapest
18:00 CET (UTC+1)	Timár (yellow card) 17' (yellow-red card) 76'; Balog (yellow card) 34'; Jovánczai (yellow card) 43'	Report	B. Kovács (yellow card) 19'; G. Nagy I (yellow card) 43'; Török 57'; Sallai (yellow card) 73'; Torma 78'	Stadium: Üllői úti stadion Attendance: 2,500; Referee: Csaba Imre Sápi

19 November 2005 12	Rákospalota	1–3	Honvéd	Budapest
13:00 CET (UTC+1)	Nyerges 16' (pen.); Somorjai (yellow card) 51'; Torma (yellow card) 67'	Report	N. Kovács (yellow card) 16'; Alves 25' (pen.); Lobo 48'; Z. Kovács II (yellow card) 62'; Dobos 76'	Stadium: Budai II. László Stadion; Attendance: 2,500; Referee: István Vad

26 November 2005 13	Pápa	1–3	Rákospalota	Pápa
17:00 CET (UTC+1)	Müller (yellow card) 26' (yellow-red card) 70'; Hercegfalvi 44'; Lászka (yellow card) 73'; Herczeg (yellow card) 84'	Report	Cseri (yellow card) 7', (goal) 20'; G. Horváth I (yellow card) 64'; Nyerges 71'; Torma 90'	Stadium: Perutz Stadion; Attendance: 700; Referee: Mihály Fábián

3 December 2005 14	Rákospalota	2–1	Zalaegerszeg	Budapest
13:00 CET (UTC+1)	Torma 31'; Cseri 43'	Report	Montvai 29'; Bojović (yellow card) 73'	Stadium: Budai II. László Stadion; Attendance: 800; Referee: Tamás Arany

10 December 2005 15	Kaposvár	1–0	Rákospalota	Kaposvár
15:00 CET (UTC+1)	Oláh 28', (red card) 80'; Hegedűs (yellow card) 65'; Maróti (yellow card) 75'; Bank (yellow card) 77'; Kovácsevics (yellow card) 90+2'	Report	Sallai (yellow card) 7', (red card) 80'; T. Németh (yellow card) 64'; G. Nagy II (red card) 80'	Stadium: Rákóczi Stadion; Attendance: 2,000; Referee: Zoltán Szarka

25 February 2006 16	MTK	1–0	Rákospalota	Budapest
16:00 CET (UTC+1)	K. Németh 66'	Report	G. Nagy I (yellow card) 59'	Stadium: Hidegkuti Nándor Stadion; Attendance: 600; Referee: Ferenc Bede

4 March 2006 17	Rákospalota	1–2	Győr	Budapest
14:30 CET (UTC+1)	Polonkai (yellow card) 30'; Torma (yellow card) 44'; Nyerges 48', (yellow card) 75'; B. Kovács (yellow card) 73'	Report	Priskin 15', (yellow card) 21'; Bank (yellow card) 54'; Vincze 81' (pen.)	Stadium: Budai II. László Stadion; Attendance: 1,000; Referee: Mihály Fábián

11 March 2006 18	Újpest	2–0	Rákospalota	Budapest
16:00 CET (UTC+1)	G. Sándor (yellow card) 15'; Rajczi 45', 85'	Report	Kapcsos (yellow card) 38'; Tamási (yellow card) 41'; G. Horváth I (yellow card) 48'	Stadium: Szusza Ferenc Stadion; Attendance: 4,320; Referee: Szabolcs Saskőy

18 March 2006 19	Diósgyőr	1–1	Rákospalota	Miskolc
16:00 CET (UTC+1)	Mogyorósi (yellow card) 13'; Vitelki (yellow card) 41'; Szögedi 76'; Fodor (yellow card) 90'	Report	Polonkai (yellow card) 28', (goal) 82'; Cseri (yellow card) 57'; Földvári (yellow card) 89' (yellow-red card) 90'	Stadium: Diósgyőri Stadion; Attendance: 3,000; Referee: Péter Solymosi

25 March 2006 20	Vasas	2–2	Rákospalota	Budapest
17:00 CET (UTC+1)	Gyánó 30', 32'; Kapič (yellow card) 58'; Hegedűs (yellow card) 88'	Report	Torma 2'; Polonkai 86'; G. Nagy I (yellow card) 90+2'	Stadium: Stadion Rudolf Illovszky; Attendance: 3,000; Referee: Sándor Gergely

31 March 2006 21	Fehérvár	3–1	Rákospalota	Székesfehérvár
19:00 CEST (UTC+2)	Sitku 6', 50'; Csizmadia 89'	Report	Polonkai 65'; Koltai (yellow card) 67'	Stadium: Sóstói Stadion; Attendance: 1,800; Referee: József Erdős

8 April 2006 22	Rákospalota	1–1	Pécs	Budapest
16:30 CEST (UTC+2)	G. Horváth I (yellow card) 74'; Nyerges 90'	Report	Dienes (yellow card) 24'; Győri (yellow card) 39'; Schindler 46', (yellow card) 78'; Lantos (yellow card) 80'	Stadium: Budai II. László Stadion; Attendance: 1,000; Referee: Szabolcs Saskőy

14 April 2006 23	Debrecen	6–1	Rákospalota	Debrecen
19:00 CEST (UTC+2)	Halmosi 5', 27'; Bernáth (yellow card) 18'; Böőr (yellow card) 36'; Brnović 49', 56', 67'; G. Horváth I 72' (o.g.)	Report	Polonkai 10'; Török (yellow card) 13'; Cseri (yellow card) 77'	Stadium: Oláh Gábor utcai Stadion; Attendance: 3,500; Referee: Sándor Andó-Szabó

22 April 2006 24	Rákospalota	0–2	Tatabánya	Budapest
17:00 CEST (UTC+2)	Dinka (yellow card) 26'; Sallai (yellow card) 40'; G. Nagy I (yellow card) 48'	Report	Vámosi 5'; Ngalle 18'; Megyesi (yellow card) 38'	Stadium: Budai II. László Stadion; Attendance: 1,200; Referee: Csaba Imre Sápi

29 April 2006 25	Sopron	0–1	Rákospalota	Sopron
18:00 CEST (UTC+2)		Report	Török 1'; G. Horváth I (yellow card) 4'; Somorjai (yellow card) 8'; B. Kovács (yellow card) 50'	Stadium: Káposztás utcai Stadion; Attendance: 1,500; Referee: Péter Solymosi

6 May 2006 26	Rákospalota	1–0	Ferencváros	Budapest
15:00 CEST (UTC+2)	Polonkai 69'; Sallai (yellow card) 89'	Report	Timár (yellow card) 4'; Jovánczai (yellow card) 33'; Balog (yellow card) 68'	Stadium: Budai II. László Stadion; Attendance: 3,000; Referee: Ferenc Bede

13 May 2006 27	Honvéd	1–3	Rákospalota	Budapest
19:00 CEST (UTC+2)	Baranyai 20'; Angoua (red card) 33'; Bozori (yellow card) 76'; Takács (yellow card) 78'; Dobos (yellow card) 85'	Report	Somorjai 2', 49'; G. Horváth I (yellow card) 27'; G. Nagy I (yellow card) 43'; Földvári (yellow card) 64'; Polonkai 90+3'	Stadium: Bozsik József Stadion; Attendance: 1,200; Referee: Csaba Imre Sápi

20 May 2006 28	Rákospalota	2–2	Pápa	Budapest
18:00 CEST (UTC+2)	Földvári 34'; Nyerges 64' (pen.); Szirtesi (yellow card) 77'; Polonkai (red card) 90'	Report	Brandelli (yellow card) 3' (yellow-red card) 90'; Kozarek 9'; Gaál (yellow card) 20'; Farkas (yellow card) 28'; Varga (yellow card) 64'; Manoel 73'	Stadium: Budai II. László Stadion; Attendance: 1,500; Referee: János Megyebíró

27 May 2006 29	Zalaegerszeg	3–0	Rákospalota	Zalaegerszeg
19:00 CEST (UTC+2)	Sebők 6'; Józsi 12', 72'; Csóka (yellow card) 43'	Report	Kapcsos (yellow card) 18'; Földvári (yellow card) 67'	Stadium: ZTE Arena; Attendance: 2,200; Referee: Ferenc Bede

3 June 2006 30	Rákospalota	0–3	Kaposvár	Budapest
18:00 CEST (UTC+2)	G. Nagy I (yellow card) 61'	Report	Alves 47'; Finta (yellow card) 51'; Zsolnai 63'; Pintér 75'; Vasiljević (yellow card) 79'	Stadium: Budai II. László Stadion; Attendance: 1,200; Referee: Péter Solymosi

=== Magyar Kupa ===
11 September 2005 Second round	Jánossomorja	1–5	Rákospalota	Jánossomorja
	Andrejcsák (yellow card); Drobnitsch (yellow card); Szalka; Göblyös (red card) 73'		Csopaki; Nyerges x2; Sallai; Török; G. Nagy I (red card) 60'	Stadium: Jánossomorjai Sporttelep; Attendance: 400; Referee: Tamás Bognár

21 September 2005 Third round	Felsőpakony	1–3	Rákospalota	Felsőpakony
15:30 CEST (UTC+2)	G. Kopunović 89'	Report	Somorjai 64'; Nyerges 70'; Csopaki 76'	Stadium: Felsőpakonyi Sportpálya; Attendance: 600; Referee: Viktor Kassai

==== Round of 16 ====
26 October 2005 First leg	Kaposvár	1–1	Rákospalota	Kaposvár
18:00 CEST (UTC+2)	Bank (yellow card); Finta (yellow card); Zahorecz (yellow card); Zsolnai 12'	Report	G. Nagy I (yellow card); B. Kovács (red card) 79'; Nyerges 86'	Stadium: Rákóczi Stadion; Attendance: 1,000; Referee: József Erdős

12 November 2005 Second leg	Rákospalota	3–3 (4–4 (a) agg.)	Kaposvár	Budapest
	T. Horváth (yellow card); Szirtesi (yellow card); Csopaki 8'; Torma 16', 59'	Report	Máté (yellow card); Hegedűs (yellow card); Mező (yellow card); Szakály 48'; Kardos 60'; Zsolnai 90+2'	Stadium: Budai II. László Stadion; Attendance: 1,000; Referee: János Megyebíró
Note: 4–4 on aggregate. Kaposvár won on away goals.

== Statistics ==
=== Overall ===
Appearances (Apps) numbers are for appearances in competitive games only, including sub appearances.
Source: Competitions

No.	Player	Pos.	Nemzeti Bajnokság I				Magyar Kupa				Total			
No.	Player	Pos.	Apps	Goal	Booked	Sent off (straight red)	Apps	Goal	Booked	Sent off (straight red)	Apps	Goal	Booked	Sent off (straight red)
1	(Hungary) Balázs Farkas	GK	19				2				21			
2	(Hungary) Balázs Dinka	DF	13		1		3				16		1	
3	(Hungary) Csaba Földvári	MF	19	2	3	1					19	2	3	1
4	(Hungary) László Fekete	FW	3				2				5			
5	(Hungary) Balázs Sallai	DF	22		6	1	4	1			26	1	6	1
6	(Hungary) Gábor Nagy I	DF	23		10	1	3		1	1	26		11	2
7	(Hungary) Gergő Cseri	MF	22	2	3	1	3				25	2	3	1
8	(Hungary) Vince Kapcsos	MF	28		4		3				31		4	
9	(Hungary) Zoltán Tamási	DF	4		1						4		1	
10	(Hungary) Gábor Torma	FW	25	4	2		3	2			28	6	2	
11	(Hungary) Krisztián Nyerges	FW	28	7	1		4	4			32	11	1	
12	(Hungary) Viktor Szentpéteri	GK	12				2				14			
13	(Hungary) Tamás Németh	DF	14		2		4				18		2	
14	(Hungary) Balázs Kovács	DF	18		5		3			1	21		5	1
15	(Hungary) Tibor Virágh	DF	14		4		2				16		4	
16	(Hungary) Tamás Horváth	DF	7				1		1		8		1	
17	(Hungary) Gábor Horváth I	DF	24		7		3				27		7	
18	(Hungary) Attila Szirtesi	DF	16		1		3		1		19		2	
19	(Hungary) Gábor Nagy II	FW	6			1					6			1
20	(Hungary) Tamás Koltai	FW	3		1						3		1	
21	(Hungary) Sándor Török	FW	28	4	2		4	1			32	5	2	
22	(Hungary) Attila Polonkai	MF	21	7	4	1	1				22	7	4	1
23	(Hungary) Tamás Somorjai	MF	25	4	2		2	1			27	5	2	
25	(Hungary) István Csopaki	FW	24				4	3			28	3		
26	(Hungary) Tamás Floszmann	GK												
Own goals														
Totals				30	59	6		12	3	2		42	62	8

=== Clean sheets ===
			Clean sheets		
No.	Player	Games Played	Nemzeti Bajnokság I	Magyar Kupa	Total
12	(Hungary) Viktor Szentpéteri	14	4		4
1	(Hungary) Balázs Farkas	21	1		1
26	(Hungary) Tamás Floszmann	0			0
Totals			5	0	5
