= 2006–07 Rákospalotai EAC season =

Rákospalota
2006–07 season
- Owner: József Forgács
- Chairman: Róbert Kutasi
- Manager: Flórián Urbán (until 30 August); Zoltán Aczél (from 2 September)
- Stadium: Budai II. László Stadion
- Nemzeti Bajnokság I: 14th
- Magyar Kupa: Round of 16
- Top goalscorer: League: Gábor Torma (15); All: Gábor Torma (21)
- Highest home attendance: 4,000 (vs Újpest, 26 August 2006)
- Lowest home attendance: 200 (vs Zalaegerszeg, 22 November 2006)
- Average home league attendance: 1,193
Home colours	Away colours

The 2006–07 season was Rákospalotai Egyetértés Atlétikai Club's or shortly REAC's 60th competitive season, 2nd consecutive season in the Nemzeti Bajnokság I and 94th year in existence as a football club. In addition to the domestic league, Rákospalota participated in this season's editions of the Magyar Kupa.

After managing the team for 2 years and earning promotion to the first division with the team, the club's board has terminated the contract on 30 August 2006 of Flórián Urbán by mutual agreement after 4 rounds in the league due to lack of results. Zoltán Aczél was placed in charge, who has been leading Újpest's reserves before.

== First team squad ==
The players listed had league appearances and stayed until the end of the season.

Note: Flags indicate national team as defined under FIFA eligibility rules; some limited exceptions apply. Players may hold more than one non-FIFA nationality.

No.	Pos.	Nation	Player
1	GK	HUN	Dániel Illyés
2	DF	HUN	Balázs Dinka
3	DF	HUN	Csaba Regedei
4	DF	HUN	Zsolt Makra
5	MF	HUN	Balázs Sallai
6	MF	HUN	Balázs Schrancz
7	MF	HUN	Gergő Cseri
8	MF	HUN	Vince Kapcsos
9	FW	HUN	Károly Kovacsics (loaned from Felcsút)
10	FW	HUN	Gábor Torma
11	FW	HUN	Krisztián Nyerges
13	MF	HUN	Tamás Kiss

No.	Pos.	Nation	Player
14	DF	HUN	Balázs Kovács
15	DF	HUN	Tibor Virágh
17	DF	HUN	Gábor Horváth
18	FW	HUN	Gergely Délczeg
20	DF	HUN	Oliver Pusztai (loaned from Győr)
21	FW	HUN	Sándor Török
22	MF	HUN	Attila Polonkai
23	MF	HUN	Tamás Somorjai
24	MF	HUN	Norbert Tóth
26	GK	HUN	Balázs Farkas
36	GK	HUN	Tamás Floszmann

== Transfers ==
=== Transfers in ===
Date	Pos.	No.	Player	From	Ref
1 July 2006	DF	4	(Hungary) Zsolt Makra	Győr	
26 July 2006	FW	19	(Hungary) Balázs Bozori	Újpest	
26 July 2006	FW	18	(Hungary) Gergely Délczeg	Youth team	
26 July 2006	GK	1	(Hungary) Dániel Illyés	Újpest	
27 July 2006	MF	13	(Hungary) Tamás Kiss	Youth team	
18 September 2006	MF	24	(Hungary) Zsolt Bárányos	Vasas	
22 February 2007	DF	3	(Hungary) Csaba Regedei	Győr	
22 February 2007	MF	6	(Hungary) Balázs Schrancz	Honvéd	
22 February 2007	MF	24	(Hungary) Norbert Tóth	Újpest	

=== Transfers out ===
Date	Pos.	No.	Player	To	Ref
14 July 2006	FW	25	(Hungary) István Csopaki	Tatabánya	
26 July 2006	FW	19	(Hungary) Gábor Nagy II	Soroksár	
26 July 2006	DF	13	(Hungary) Tamás Németh	Soroksár	
28 July 2006	DF	16	(Hungary) Tamás Horváth	Békéscsaba	
31 January 2007	MF	24	(Hungary) Zsolt Bárányos	(Greece) Asteras Tripolis	
7 February 2007	MF	3	(Hungary) Csaba Földvári	(Austria) SC Marchtrenk	
8 February 2007	DF	6	(Hungary) Gábor Nagy I	(Switzerland) Aarau	
16 February 2007	DF	9	(Hungary) Zoltán Tamási	Felcsút	
19 February 2007	FW	19	(Hungary) Balázs Bozori	Vác	
20 February 2007	GK	12	(Hungary) Viktor Szentpéteri	Dunaújváros	

=== Loans in ===
Start date	End date	Pos.	No.	Player	From	Ref
1 July 2006	End of season	DF	20	(Hungary) Oliver Pusztai	Győr	
1 January 2007	End of season	FW	9	(Hungary) Károly Kovacsics	Felcsút	

=== Loans out ===
Start date	End date	Pos.	No.	Player	To	Ref

== Competitions ==
=== Overview ===
Competition	First match	Last match	Starting round	Final position	Record							
Competition	First match	Last match	Starting round	Final position	Pld	W	D	L	GF	GA	GD	Win %
Nemzeti Bajnokság I	29 July 2006	26 May 2007	Matchday 1	14th	30	9	7	14	42	55	−13	30.00
Magyar Kupa	19 September 2006	22 November 2006	Third round	Round of 16	4	3	0	1	13	4	+9	75.00
Total					34	12	7	15	55	59	−4	35.29

Source: Competitions

=== Nemzeti Bajnokság I ===
==== League table ====
Pos	Team	Pld	W	D	L	GF	GA	GD	Pts	Qualification or relegation
12	Tatabánya	30	11	3	16	46	58	−12	36	
13	Győr	30	9	8	13	37	43	−6	35	
14	Rákospalota	30	9	7	14	42	55	−13	34	
15	Pécs (R)	30	7	12	11	31	41	−10	33	Relegation to Nemzeti Bajnokság II
16	Dunakanyar-Vác (R)	30	4	7	19	21	57	−36	19	Relegation to Nemzeti Bajnokság II

Source: soccerway.com
(R) Relegated

==== Results summary ====
Overall								Home						Away					
Pld	W	D	L	GF	GA	GD	Pts	W	D	L	GF	GA	GD	W	D	L	GF	GA	GD
30	9	7	14	42	55	−13	34	6	2	7	25	26	−1	3	5	7	17	29	−12

Source: HFF

==== Results by round ====
Round	1	2	3	4	5	6	7	8	9	10	11	12	13	14	15	16	17	18	19	20	21	22	23	24	25	26	27	28	29	30
Ground	A	H	A	H	H	A	H	A	H	A	H	A	H	A	H	H	A	H	A	A	H	A	H	A	H	A	H	A	H	A
Result	L	L	D	L	L	L	L	D	W	L	D	W	L	W	W	D	L	W	D	L	W	W	W	D	L	L	W	L	L	D
Position	16	16	16	16	16	16	16	16	16	16	16	15	15	15	13	14	14	14	14	15	15	13	9	10	12	14	12	13	13	14
Points	0	0	1	1	1	1	1	2	5	5	6	9	9	12	15	16	16	19	20	20	23	26	29	30	30	30	33	33	33	34

Source: Matches
A = Away; H = Home; W = Win; D = Draw; L = Loss

==== Matches ====
29 July 2006 1	MTK	4–0	Rákospalota	Budapest
20:00 CEST (UTC+2)	Hrepka 8', 40', 70'; Rodenbücher 58'; J. Kanta (yellow card) 62'	Report	G. Horváth (yellow card) 50'; Pusztai (yellow card) 58'; Polonkai (yellow card) 79'	Stadium: Hidegkuti Nándor Stadion; Attendance: 1,000; Referee: Zsolt Szabó

5 August 2006 2	Rákospalota	0–2	Diósgyőr	Budapest
17:30 CEST (UTC+2)	Cseri (yellow card) 18'; Pusztai (yellow card) 90+2'	Report	V. Farkas (yellow card) 19'; Szögedi (yellow card) 28'; Simon 74'; Stanić 76'	Stadium: Budai II. László Stadion; Attendance: 2,000; Referee: Péter Solymosi

20 August 2006 3	Győr	2–2	Rákospalota	Győr
17:00 CEST (UTC+2)	Bajzát 40', 42'; Jäkl (yellow card) 61'; Tokody (yellow card) 71'; Mátyus (yellow card) 84'	Report	Torma 25', (yellow card) 77'; G. Nagy I (yellow card) 27'; G. Horváth (yellow card) 46'; Nyerges 57'; Török (yellow card) 71'; Makra (yellow card) 71'	Stadium: Pápai úti sporttelep Attendance: 4,000; Referee: Viktor Kassai

26 August 2006 4	Rákospalota	1–2	Újpest	Budapest
17:30 CEST (UTC+2)	Makra (yellow card) 51'; G. Nagy I (yellow card) 55' (yellow-red card) 90+1'; Pusztai (yellow card) 86'; Torma 90'	Report	Tisza 23', 28'; Völgyi (yellow card) 32'; Erős (yellow card) 87'	Stadium: Budai II. László Stadion; Attendance: 4,000; Referee: Tamás Arany

10 September 2006 5	Rákospalota	3–4	Honvéd	Budapest
16:30 CEST (UTC+2)	Makra (yellow card) 40', (goal) 90+4'; Kapcsos (yellow card) 43'; G. Horváth (yellow card) 45'; Cseri (yellow card) 51'; Nyerges 70', 84' (pen.)	Report	Genito 18'; Koós 26'; Angoua (yellow card) 46'; Budovinszky 60', (red card) 85'; Hercegfalvi 67', (yellow card) 69'	Stadium: Budai II. László Stadion; Attendance: 1,500; Referee: Tamás Bognár

16 September 2006 6	Zalaegerszeg	3–0	Rákospalota	Zalaegerszeg
19:00 CEST (UTC+2)	Sebők (yellow card) 10', (goal) 47'; Sebők (yellow card) 17'; Máté 29'; Z. Tóth 34'	Report	Torma (yellow card) 18'; Török (yellow card) 24'; Földvári (yellow card) 63'	Stadium: ZTE Arena; Attendance: 7,500; Referee: Zsolt Szabó

23 September 2006 7	Rákospalota	1–3	Sopron	Budapest
16:00 CEST (UTC+2)	G. Nagy I (yellow card) 7' (yellow-red card) 81'; Pusztai (yellow card) 39'; Somorjai 54'; Bárányos (yellow card) 65'	Report	Feczesin 13', 23', 41'; Radu (yellow card) 71'	Stadium: Budai II. László Stadion; Attendance: 400; Referee: István Mészáros

30 September 2006 8	Pécs	2–2	Rákospalota	Pécs
16:00 CEST (UTC+2)	Bajúsz (yellow card) 9'; Pavičević (yellow card) 40'; Laki 79'; Sipos 88'	Report	Kapcsos 12'; B. Farkas I (yellow card) 70'; Pusztai 86'; G. Horváth (yellow card) 90+1'	Stadium: Stadion PMFC; Attendance: 1,000; Referee: József Berger

14 October 2006 9	Rákospalota	4–3	Paks	Budapest
15:00 CEST (UTC+2)	Cseri 23'; Bárányos 30'; Torma 45'; Nyerges 55'	Report	T. Kiss I 58'; Heffler 71'; Z. Molnár 89'	Stadium: Budai II. László Stadion; Attendance: 1,200; Referee: Zoltán Iványi

21 October 2006 10	Vasas	1–0	Rákospalota	Budapest
18:00 CEST (UTC+2)	Ködöböcz (yellow card) 60'; N. Németh 90+2'	Report	Polonkai (yellow card) 31'; Pusztai (red card) 60'; Földvári (yellow card) 88'	Stadium: Stadion Rudolf Illovszky; Attendance: 2,500; Referee: Szabolcs Szilasi

28 October 2006 11	Rákospalota	1–1	Kaposvár	Budapest
14:30 CEST (UTC+2)	Torma 40'; Sallai (yellow card) 57'; Makra (yellow card) 76'	Report	Petrók (yellow card) 37'; Oláh 89'; Maróti (red card) 89'	Stadium: Budai II. László Stadion; Attendance: 1,000; Referee: Károly Török

4 November 2006 12	Vác	0–1	Rákospalota	Vác
17:00 CEST (UTC+2)	Udvari (yellow card) 76'; Kunzo (yellow card) 82'	Report	Bárányos (yellow card) 52'; Somorjai 64'; Polonkai (yellow card) 66'	Stadium: Ligeti Stadion; Attendance: 1,200; Referee: Viktor Kassai

11 November 2006 13	Rákospalota	1–3	Debrecen	Budapest
13:30 CEST (UTC+2)	Pusztai 58'	Report	Dombi 49'; Zsolnai 65', 76'	Stadium: Budai II. László Stadion; Attendance: 1,000; Referee: Tamás Arany

18 November 2006 14	Tatabánya	2–3	Rákospalota	Tatabánya
13:00 CEST (UTC+2)	Vámosi (yellow card) 35', (goal) 58'; Megyesi 81'	Report	Nyerges 11', 57'; Polonkai (yellow card) 70'; Torma 85'	Stadium: Stadion Városi; Attendance: 1,200; Referee: Károly Török

25 November 2006 15	Rákospalota	2–0	Fehérvár	Budapest
13:00 CEST (UTC+2)	Sallai (yellow card) 33'; Pusztai (yellow card) 45'; Kapcsos (yellow card) 64'; Somorjai 75'; Nyerges 77'	Report	Kocsis (red card) 25'; Dajić (yellow card) 28'	Stadium: Budai II. László Stadion; Attendance: 600; Referee: Sándor Gergely

2 December 2006 16	Rákospalota	0–0	MTK	Budapest
13:30 CET (UTC+1)	Kapcsos (yellow card) 59'; Török (yellow card) 82'	Report	J. Kanta (yellow card) 52'; Czvitkovics (yellow card) 90+1'	Stadium: Budai II. László Stadion; Attendance: 600; Referee: Tamás Arany

10 December 2006 17	Diósgyőr	1–0	Rákospalota	Miskolc
15:00 CEST (UTC+2)	Kéthévoama 5'; Szögedi (yellow card) 79'; Katona (yellow card) 84'	Report	Pusztai (yellow card) 4' (yellow-red card) 67'	Stadium: Diósgyőri Stadion; Attendance: 5,500; Referee: Sándor Andó-Szabó

24 February 2007 18	Rákospalota	2–0	Győr	Budapest
14:00 CEST (UTC+2)	Torma 7', 75'; Schrancz (yellow card) 42'; Sallai (yellow card) 88'	Report	Varga (yellow card) 68'; Bank (yellow card) 86'	Stadium: Budai II. László Stadion; Attendance: 700; Referee: Sándor Gergely

3 March 2007 19	Újpest	0–0	Rákospalota	Budapest
16:00 CEST (UTC+2)		Report	Török (yellow card) 5'; Makra (yellow card) 44'; Nyerges (yellow card) 62'	Stadium: Szusza Ferenc Stadion; Attendance: 3,502; Referee: Tamás Arany

10 March 2007 20	Honvéd	2–1	Rákospalota	Budapest
16:00 CEST (UTC+2)	Vincze (yellow card) 24'; Smiljanić (yellow card) 47'; Dobos 57'; Koós 81'	Report	Török (yellow card) 8'; Pusztai (yellow card) 25'; Sallai (yellow card) 42'; Torma 47'; Kapcsos (yellow card) 88'	Stadium: Bozsik József Stadion; Attendance: 3,500; Referee: Csaba Imre Sápi

17 March 2007 21	Rákospalota	2–1	Zalaegerszeg	Budapest
15:00 CEST (UTC+2)	Torma 4', 12'; Illyés (yellow card) 56'; Somorjai (yellow card) 83'; G. Horváth (yellow card) 90+2'	Report	Botiș (yellow card) 46'; Francišković (yellow card) 71'; Waltner 85'; Lekić (yellow card) 90+2'	Stadium: Budai II. László Stadion; Attendance: 500; Referee: Zoltán Iványi

31 March 2007 22	Sopron	2–3	Rákospalota	Sopron
16:00 CEST (UTC+2)	Ankamah (red card) 18'; Sira 21'; Magasföldi 37', (yellow card) 63'; Ibric (yellow card) 60'	Report	Somorjai 8'; Kapcsos (red card) 18'; Cseri (yellow card) 25'; Regedei 42'; Torma 59'; Polonkai (yellow card) 90'	Stadium: Káposztás utcai Stadion; Attendance: 2,500; Referee: Tamás Bognár

7 April 2007 23	Rákospalota	1–0	Pécs	Budapest
16:30 CEST (UTC+2)	Polonkai 33', (yellow card) 74'; Sallai (yellow card) 78'	Report	Kulcsár (yellow card) 90+2'	Stadium: Budai II. László Stadion; Attendance: 1,000; Referee: Zsolt Szabó

14 April 2007 24	Paks	1–1	Rákospalota	Paks
17:00 CEST (UTC+2)	Balaskó (yellow card) 21' (yellow-red card) 24', (goal) 24'; Z. Molnár (yellow card) 27'; Zováth (yellow card) 45'; T. Kiss I (yellow card) 56'	Report	Sallai (red card) 45'; Török (yellow card) 80'; G. Horváth 83'; Nyerges (yellow card) 90'	Stadium: Fehérvári úti Stadion; Attendance: 1,000; Referee: József Berger

21 April 2007 25	Rákospalota	1–3	Vasas	Budapest
17:00 CEST (UTC+2)	Somorjai (yellow card) 18'; G. Horváth (yellow card) 37'; Kapcsos (red card) 58'; Torma 86'	Report	Lázok 45'; Pandur 64'; K. Kiss 87'	Stadium: Budai II. László Stadion; Attendance: 1,200; Referee: Ferenc Bede

28 April 2007 26	Kaposvár	3–1	Rákospalota	Kaposvár
18:00 CEST (UTC+2)	Maróti (yellow card) 50'; Oláh 53'; Vasiljević 67', 70'; Božović (yellow card) 81'; Pintér (yellow card) 82'	Report	Somorjai 17'; Pusztai (yellow card) 47'; Schrancz (yellow card) 74'; Makra (yellow card) 88'	Stadium: Stadion Rákóczi; Attendance: 2,500; Referee: Péter Solymosi

5 May 2007 27	Rákospalota	4–0	Vác	Budapest
17:30 CEST (UTC+2)	Pusztai 28'; Torma 65' (pen.), 74'; Somorjai 71'	Report	Thomas (yellow card) 57'; P. Kovács (yellow card) 62' (yellow-red card) 70'	Stadium: Budai II. László Stadion; Attendance: 1,000; Referee: Sándor Andó-Szabó

14 May 2007 28	Debrecen	4–1	Rákospalota	Debrecen
18:00 CEST (UTC+2)	Szilágyi 7'; Dombi (yellow card) 21'; Leandro 28', 72'; Dzsudzsák (yellow card) 81', (goal) 82'	Report	Cseri (yellow card) 10'; Polonkai (yellow card) 32'; Nyerges 55'	Stadium: Oláh Gábor utcai Stadion; Attendance: 10,000; Referee: József Berger

19 May 2007 29	Rákospalota	2–4	Tatabánya	Budapest
18:00 CEST (UTC+2)	Nyerges 38', 80'; Kapcsos (yellow card) 42'; Polonkai (yellow card) 50'; Sallai (yellow card) 62'	Report	Kichi 22', 56'; Filó (yellow card) 54'; Balog 65'; Hajdú 84'	Stadium: Budai II. László Stadion; Attendance: 1,200; Referee: Tamás Arany

26 May 2007 30	Fehérvár	2–2	Rákospalota	Székesfehérvár
18:00 CEST (UTC+2)	Božić (yellow card) 20'; D. Nagy 58'; B. Farkas II (yellow card) 61'; Dajić (yellow card) 81', (goal) 81'	Report	G. Horváth (yellow card) 32'; N. Tóth 47', (yellow card) 47'; Torma 57'; Cseri (yellow card) 70'	Stadium: Sóstói Stadion; Attendance: 1,660; Referee: Csaba Imre Sápi

=== Magyar Kupa ===
19 September 2006 Third round	Tuzsér	0–3	Rákospalota	Tuzsér
		Report	Torma 33', 39'; Makra 70'	Stadium: Lónyay Kastélykerti pálya Attendance: 800; Referee: Roland Veizer
Note: Source:

25 October 2006 Fourth round	Berkenye	0–6	Rákospalota	Berkenye
	Nyikos (yellow card) 25'	Report	Bárányos x2; Kapcsos; Torma x3	Stadium: Berkenyei Sportpálya; Attendance: 500; Referee: S. Varga

==== Round of 16 ====
8 November 2006 First leg	Zalaegerszeg	1–0	Rákospalota	Zalaegerszeg
	Máté (yellow card) 39'; Sebők (red card) 41'; Botiș (yellow card) 45'; Ferenczi 55' (pen.); Lendvai (yellow card) 62'	Report	B. Kovács (yellow card) 88'	Stadium: ZTE Arena; Attendance: 1,000; Referee: Ferenc Bede

22 November 2006 Second leg	Rákospalota	4–3 (4–4 (a) agg.)	Zalaegerszeg	Budapest
	Torma 9', (yellow card) 34'; Pusztai 36', 86'; Kapcsos (yellow card) 38'; G. Horváth (yellow card) 53'; Bárányos (yellow card) 45' (yellow-red card) 45'; G. Nagy I 74'; Makra (yellow card) 90+1' (yellow-red card) 90+5'	Report	Waltner 11', 26'; Ferenczi 75'; Kocsárdi (yellow card) 76'; B. Molnár (yellow card) 87'	Stadium: Budai II. László Stadion; Attendance: 200; Referee: Mihály Fábián
Note: 4–4 on aggregate. Zalaegerszeg won on away goals.

== Statistics ==
=== Overall ===
Appearances (Apps) numbers are for appearances in competitive games only, including sub appearances.
Source: Competitions

No.	Player	Pos.	Nemzeti Bajnokság I				Magyar Kupa				Total			
No.	Player	Pos.	Apps	Goal	Yellow card	Red card	Apps	Goal	Yellow card	Red card	Apps	Goal	Yellow card	Red card
1	(Hungary) Dániel Illyés	GK	17		1		4				21		1	
2	(Hungary) Balázs Dinka	DF	24				3				27			
3	(Hungary) Csaba Regedei	DF	12	1							12	1		
3	(Hungary) Csaba Földvári	MF	12		2						12		2	
4	(Hungary) Zsolt Makra	DF	15	1	6		4	1		1	19	2	6	1
5	(Hungary) Balázs Sallai	MF	23		6	1	2				25		6	1
6	(Hungary) Gábor Nagy I	DF	6		1	2	2	1			8	1	1	2
6	(Hungary) Balázs Schrancz	MF	13		2						13		2	
7	(Hungary) Gergő Cseri	MF	27	1	5		4				31	1	5	
8	(Hungary) Vince Kapcsos	MF	24	1	5	2	4	1	1		28	2	6	2
9	(Hungary) Károly Kovacsics	FW	7								7			
9	(Hungary) Zoltán Tamási	DF	8				3				11			
10	(Hungary) Gábor Torma	FW	29	15	2		4	6	1		33	21	3	
11	(Hungary) Krisztián Nyerges	FW	30	10	2		3				33	10	2	
12	(Hungary) Viktor Szentpéteri	GK	6								6			
13	(Hungary) Tamás Kiss	MF	1								1			
14	(Hungary) Balázs Kovács	DF	8				1		1		9		1	
15	(Hungary) Tibor Virágh	DF	3				2				5			
17	(Hungary) Gábor Horváth	DF	22	1	7		3		1		25	1	8	
18	(Hungary) Gergely Délczeg	FW	2				1				3			
19	(Hungary) Balázs Bozori	FW	3								3			
20	(Hungary) Oliver Pusztai	DF	23	3	7	2	3	2			26	5	7	2
21	(Hungary) Sándor Török	FW	21		6		4				25		6	
22	(Hungary) Attila Polonkai	MF	25	1	8		4				29	1	8	
23	(Hungary) Tamás Somorjai	MF	29	6	2		2				31	6	2	
24	(Hungary) Zsolt Bárányos	MF	9	1	2		3	2		1	12	3	2	1
24	(Hungary) Norbert Tóth	MF	11	1	1						11	1	1	
26	(Hungary) Balázs Farkas	GK	7		1						7		1	
Own goals														
Totals				42	66	7		13	4	2		55	70	9

=== Hat-tricks ===
No.	Player	Against	Result	Date	Competition	Round
10	(Hungary) Gábor Torma	Berkenye	6–0 (A)	25 October 2006	Magyar Kupa	Fourth round

=== Clean sheets ===
			Clean sheets		
No.	Player	Games Played	Nemzeti Bajnokság I	Magyar Kupa	Total
1	(Hungary) Dániel Illyés	21	6	2	8
26	(Hungary) Balázs Farkas	7	1		1
12	(Hungary) Viktor Szentpéteri	6	0		0
Totals			7	2	9
