= 2005–06 Kaposvári Rákóczi FC season =

Kaposvár
2005–06 season
- Manager: László Prukner
- Stadium: Rákóczi Stadion
- Nemzeti Bajnokság I: 7th
- Magyar Kupa: Quarter-finals
- Highest home attendance: 5,500 (vs Ferencváros, 25 March 2006)
- Lowest home attendance: 1,000 (vs Rákospalota, 26 October 2005)
- Average home league attendance: 2,526

Kaposvári Rákóczi Football Club played their 7th competitive season in 2005–06. This was their 2nd consecutive season in the Nemzeti Bajnokság I and 82nd year in existence as a football club. In addition to the domestic league, Kaposvár participated in this season's editions of the Magyar Kupa.

== Squad ==
Note: Flags indicate national team as defined under FIFA eligibility rules; some limited exceptions apply. Players may hold more than one non-FIFA nationality.

No.	Pos.	Nation	Player
1	GK	HUN	Szabolcs Balajcza
3	DF	HUN	Attila Pintér
5	MF	HUN	Péter Szakály
6	DF	HUN	Róbert Kovácsevics
7	DF	SVK	Ladislav Kozmér
8	FW	HUN	Ernő Kardos
9	FW	BRA	André Alves
11	MF	SCG	Attila Andruskó
12	GK	HUN	László Házi
13	DF	HUN	Tamás Mező
14	FW	SCG	Lóránt Oláh
15	FW	HUN	Róbert Zsolnai

No.	Pos.	Nation	Player
16	MF	HUN	Péter Máté
17	DF	HUN	Viktor Petrók
18	DF	HUN	Zoltán Finta
20	MF	HUN	Attila Kriston
21	MF	HUN	Máté Halmos
22	MF	SCG	Dušan Vasiljević
25	MF	HUN	Béla Maróti
26	DF	HUN	Péter Tereánszki-Tóth
27	MF	HUN	Dénes Szakály
28	DF	HUN	Krisztián Zahorecz
29	GK	HUN	László Szűcs
—	FW	HUN	László Egle

== Competitions ==
=== Overview ===
Competition	First match	Last match	Starting round	Final position	Record							
Competition	First match	Last match	Starting round	Final position	Pld	W	D	L	GF	GA	GD	Win %
Nemzeti Bajnokság I	30 July 2005	3 June 2006	Matchday 1	7th	30	10	7	13	35	41	−6	33.33
Magyar Kupa	21 September 2005	22 March 2006	Third round	Quarter-finals	5	1	2	2	11	9	+2	20.00
Total					35	11	9	15	46	50	−4	31.43

Source: Competitions

=== Nemzeti Bajnokság I ===
==== League table ====
Pos	Team	Pld	W	D	L	GF	GA	GD	Pts	Qualification or relegation
5	Tatabánya	30	11	8	11	46	45	+1	41	
6	Ferencváros (R)	30	10	11	9	43	38	+5	41	Relegated to Nemzeti Bajnokság II (Note: Ferencvárosi TC were relegated to the Nemzeti Bajnokság II because the club failed to comply with UEFA licensing rules.)
7	Kaposvár	30	10	7	13	35	41	−6	37	
8	Diósgyőr	30	10	7	13	33	44	−11	37	
9	Győr	30	9	9	12	47	50	−3	36	

Source: RSSSF
(R) Relegated

==== Results summary ====
Overall								Home						Away					
Pld	W	D	L	GF	GA	GD	Pts	W	D	L	GF	GA	GD	W	D	L	GF	GA	GD
30	10	7	13	35	41	−6	37	6	5	4	20	15	+5	4	2	9	15	26	−11

Source: Competitions

==== Matches ====
30 July 2005 1	Pécs	2–1	Kaposvár	Pécs
19:00 CEST (UTC+2)	Balaskó 17', 25' (pen.)		P. Szakály 77'	Stadium: Stadion PMFC; Attendance: 2,000; Referee: Ferenc Bede

20 August 2005 3	Tatabánya	1–0	Kaposvár	Tatabánya
17:00 CEST (UTC+2)	Márkus 74' (pen.)			Stadium: Stadion Városi; Attendance: 2,500; Referee: Attila Hanacsek

28 August 2005 4	Kaposvár	2–0	Sopron	Kaposvár
19:00 CEST (UTC+2)	Zsolnai 40'; Máté 54'			Stadium: Rákóczi Stadion; Attendance: 2,500; Referee: Zoltán Szarka

17 September 2005 5	Ferencváros	1–1	Kaposvár	Budapest
19:00 CEST (UTC+2)	Laczkó 63'		Nagypál 17'	Stadium: Üllői úti Stadion; Attendance: 4,666; Referee: Csaba Imre Sápi

24 September 2005 6	Kaposvár	0–0	Honvéd	Kaposvár
19:00 CEST (UTC+2)				Stadium: Rákóczi Stadion; Attendance: 3,000; Referee: József Erdős

1 October 2005 7	Pápa	0–0	Kaposvár	Pápa
18:00 CEST (UTC+2)				Stadium: Perutz Stadion; Attendance: 1,200; Referee: Attila Dubraviczky

15 October 2005 8	Kaposvár	1–1	Zalaegerszeg	Kaposvár
18:00 CEST (UTC+2)	Zahorecz 50' (pen.)		Sabo 55'	Stadium: Rákóczi Stadion; Attendance: 3,000; Referee: István Vad

19 October 2005 2	Kaposvár	1–2	Debrecen	Kaposvár
18:00 CEST (UTC+2)	Zsolnai 25'		Pintér 28' (o.g.); Sidibe 30'	Stadium: Rákóczi Stadion; Attendance: 2,200; Referee: Péter Solymosi

22 October 2005 9	Fehérvár	3–0	Kaposvár	Székesfehérvár
18:00 CEST (UTC+2)	Farkas 42'; Božić 59', 90'			Stadium: Sóstói Stadion; Attendance: 4,000; Referee: Mihály Fábián

29 October 2005 10	MTK	2–1	Kaposvár	Budapest
18:00 CEST (UTC+2)	Illés 55'; Petrók 90' (o.g.)		P. Szakály 14'	Stadium: Hidegkuti Nándor Stadion; Attendance: 800; Referee: Attila Dubraviczky

5 November 2005 11	Kaposvár	1–0	Győr	Kaposvár
18:00 CET (UTC+1)	Kardos 66'			Stadium: Rákóczi Stadion; Attendance: 1,500; Referee: Zoltán Szarka

19 November 2005 12	Újpest	4–1	Kaposvár	Budapest
17:00 CET (UTC+1)	Rajczi 11'; Sándor 16'; N. Tóth 59' (pen.), 73' (pen.)		Zahorecz 24' (pen.)	Stadium: Szusza Ferenc Stadion; Attendance: 3,485; Referee: Viktor Kassai

26 November 2005 13	Kaposvár	1–3	Diósgyőr	Kaposvár
17:00 CET (UTC+1)	Zsolnai 83'		Horváth 34'; Vitelki 42'; Tisza 53'	Stadium: Rákóczi Stadion; Attendance: 1,500; Referee: János Makai Jr.

3 December 2005 14	Vasas	0–2	Kaposvár	Budapest
15:00 CET (UTC+1)			Oláh 40'; Zsolnai 52'	Stadium: Illovszky Rudolf Stadion; Attendance: 1,000; Referee: Attila Hanacsek

10 December 2005 15	Kaposvár	1–0	Rákospalota	Kaposvár
15:00 CET (UTC+1)	Oláh 28', (red card) 80'; Hegedűs (yellow card) 65'; Maróti (yellow card) 75'; Bank (yellow card) 77'; Kovácsevics (yellow card) 90+2'		Sallai (yellow card) 7', (red card) 80'; T. Németh (yellow card) 64'; G. Nagy II (red card) 80'	Stadium: Rákóczi Stadion; Attendance: 2,000; Referee: Zoltán Szarka

25 February 2006 16	Kaposvár	2–2	Pécs	Kaposvár
16:00 CET (UTC+1)	Vasiljević 48'; Zsolnai 61'		Zahorecz 84' (o.g.); Balaskó 87'	Stadium: Rákóczi Stadion; Attendance: 1,500; Referee: János Makai Jr.

4 March 2006 17	Debrecen	2–1	Kaposvár	Debrecen
16:00 CET (UTC+1)	Bogdanović 51'; Éger 66' (pen.)		P. Szakály 45'	Stadium: Oláh Gábor utcai Stadion; Attendance: 5,000; Referee: István Vad

11 March 2006 18	Kaposvár	1–1	Tatabánya	Kaposvár
16:00 CET (UTC+1)	Zsolnai 26'		Márkus 12'	Stadium: Rákóczi Stadion; Attendance: 1,500; Referee: Ferenc Bede

18 March 2006 19	Sopron	2–0	Kaposvár	Sopron
16:00 CET (UTC+1)	Bagoly 21'; Horváth 38'			Stadium: Káposztás utcai Stadion; Attendance: 3,000; Referee: Viktor Kassai

25 March 2006 20	Kaposvár	0–0	Ferencváros	Kaposvár
15:00 CET (UTC+1)				Stadium: Rákóczi Stadion; Attendance: 5,500; Referee: Szabolcs Saskőy

1 April 2006 21	Honvéd	0–2	Kaposvár	Budapest
17:00 CEST (UTC+2)			Zsolnai 5', (yellow card) 56'; Zahorecz 77', (yellow card) 78'	Stadium: Bozsik József Stadion; Attendance: 2,000; Referee: Péter Solymosi

8 April 2006 22	Kaposvár	1–0	Pápa	Kaposvár
17:00 CEST (UTC+2)	Alves 88'			Stadium: Rákóczi Stadion; Attendance: 2,000; Referee: Tamás Bognár

15 April 2006 23	Zalaegerszeg	0–1	Kaposvár	Zalaegerszeg
18:00 CEST (UTC+2)			Zahorecz 81' (pen.)	Stadium: ZTE Arena; Attendance: 3,800; Referee: Károly Török

22 April 2006 24	Kaposvár	3–0	Fehérvár	Kaposvár
18:00 CEST (UTC+2)	Alves 26'; Zahorecz 39' (pen.); Oláh 87'			Stadium: Rákóczi Stadion; Attendance: 2,500; Referee: Sándor Andó-Szabó

29 April 2006 25	Kaposvár	1–3	MTK	Kaposvár
18:00 CEST (UTC+2)	Oláh 31'		Czvitkovics 36'; Kanta 45'; Hrepka 76'	Stadium: Rákóczi Stadion; Attendance: 2,200; Referee: Sándor Gergely

6 May 2006 26	Győr	4–0	Kaposvár	Győr
19:00 CEST (UTC+2)	Bajzát 9', 35'; Granát 12', 31'			Stadium: Stadion ETO; Attendance: 350; Referee: István Mészáros

14 May 2006 27	Kaposvár	1–2	Újpest	Kaposvár
11:30 CEST (UTC+2)	Alves 60'		Kovács 20'; N. Tóth 64' (pen.)	Stadium: Rákóczi Stadion; Attendance: 5,000; Referee: Zsolt Szabó

19 May 2006 28	Diósgyőr	5–2	Kaposvár	Miskolc
19:00 CEST (UTC+2)	Sipeki 31', 53'; Binder 45', 90+2'; Jeremiás 71'		Oláh 32', 90+1'	Stadium: Diósgyőri Stadion; Attendance: 2,000; Referee: Péter Solymosi

27 May 2006 29	Kaposvár	4–1	Vasas	Kaposvár
19:00 CEST (UTC+2)	Vasiljević 17'; Kriston 48', 50'; Alves 72'		Gyánó 75'	Stadium: Rákóczi Stadion; Attendance: 2,000; Referee: Viktor Kassai

3 June 2006 30	Rákospalota	0–3	Kaposvár	Budapest
18:00 CEST (UTC+2)	G. Nagy I (yellow card) 61'		Alves 47'; Finta (yellow card) 51'; Zsolnai 63'; Pintér 75'; Vasiljević (yellow card) 79'	Stadium: Budai II. László Stadion; Attendance: 1,200; Referee: Péter Solymosi

=== Magyar Kupa ===
21 September 2005 Third round	Balkány	0–5	Kaposvár	Balkány
15:30 CEST (UTC+2)			Zsolnai 25'; P. Szakály 31'; Oláh 38', 52'; Tereánszki-Tóth 45'	Stadium: Sport utca Attendance: 500; Referee: Mihály Fábián

==== Round of 16 ====
26 October 2005 First leg	Kaposvár	1–1	Rákospalota	Kaposvár
18:00 CEST (UTC+2)	Bank (yellow card); Finta (yellow card); Zahorecz (yellow card); Zsolnai 12'	Report	G. Nagy I (yellow card); B. Kovács (red card) 79'; Nyerges 86'	Stadium: Rákóczi Stadion; Attendance: 1,000; Referee: József Erdős

12 November 2005 Second leg	Rákospalota	3–3 (4–4 (a) agg.)	Kaposvár	Budapest
	T. Horváth (yellow card); Szirtesi (yellow card); Csopaki 8'; Torma 16', 59'	Report	Máté (yellow card); Hegedűs (yellow card); Mező (yellow card); Szakály 48'; Kardos 60'; Zsolnai 90+2'	Stadium: Budai II. László Stadion; Attendance: 1,000; Referee: János Megyebíró
Note: 4–4 on aggregate. Kaposvár won on away goals.

==== Quarter-finals ====
15 March 2006 First leg	Kaposvár	1–2	Fehérvár	Kaposvár
	Alves 17'		Schwarcz 44'; Csizmadia 79'	Stadium: Rákóczi Stadion; Attendance: 1,200; Referee: József Erdős

22 March 2006 Second leg	Fehérvár	3–1 (5–2 agg.)	Kaposvár	Székesfehérvár
	Sitku 4'; Dajić 42', 65'		Oláh 86'	Stadium: Sóstói Stadion; Attendance: 2,000; Referee: Ferenc Bede
Note: Fehérvár won 5–2 on aggregate.
