= 2004–05 Rákospalotai EAC season =

Rákospalota
2004–05 season
- Owner: József Forgács
- Chairman: Róbert Kutasi
- Manager: Flórián Urbán
- Stadium: Budai II. László Stadion
- Nemzeti Bajnokság II: 2nd (promoted)
- Magyar Kupa: Second round
- Top goalscorer: League: István Csopaki (9); All: István Csopaki; Balázs Kovács (9 each)
- Highest home attendance: 2,000 (vs BKV Előre, 12 June 2005)
- Lowest home attendance: 500 (vs Orosháza, 22 August 2004)
- Average home league attendance: 938

The 2004–05 season was Rákospalotai Egyetértés Atlétikai Club's or shortly REAC's 58th competitive season, 6th consecutive season in the Nemzeti Bajnokság II and 92nd year in existence as a football club. In addition to the domestic league, Rákospalota participated in this season's editions of the Magyar Kupa.

After last year's play-off defeat, Flórián Urbán took over the team in his first year as coach. On 21 May, the club's promotion to the Nemzeti Bajnokság I was confirmed when Vác drew Mosonmagyaróvár with 3 rounds to go.

== First team squad ==
The players listed had league appearances and stayed until the end of the season.

Note: Flags indicate national team as defined under FIFA eligibility rules; some limited exceptions apply. Players may hold more than one non-FIFA nationality.

No.	Pos.	Nation	Player
-	GK	HUN	Balázs Farkas
-	GK	HUN	Viktor Szentpéteri
-	DF	HUN	Gergő Cseri
-	DF	HUN	Balázs Dinka
-	DF	HUN	István Gál
-	DF	HUN	Gábor Horváth
-	DF	HUN	Tamás Horváth
-	DF	HUN	Tamás Mihályi
-	DF	HUN	Tamás Németh (loaned from Újpest)
-	DF	HUN	Zoltán Vati
-	DF	HUN	Tibor Virágh

No.	Pos.	Nation	Player
-	MF	HUN	Kristóf Bánka
-	MF	HUN	Gábor Boér
-	MF	HUN	Csaba Felföldi
-	MF	HUN	Vince Kapcsos
-	MF	HUN	Balázs Kovács
-	MF	HUN	György Rézmányi
-	FW	HUN	István Csopaki
-	FW	HUN	László Fekete
-	FW	HUN	József Havrán
-	FW	HUN	Gábor Nagy II
-	FW	HUN	Krisztián Nyerges

== Transfers ==
=== Transfers in ===
Date	Pos.	Player	From	Ref
1 July 2004	DF	(Hungary) Gergő Cseri	Újpest	
21 July 2004	MF	(Hungary) Vince Kapcsos	Újpest	
21 July 2004	DF	(Hungary) Tamás Mihályi	Budafok	
28 July 2004	MF	(Hungary) Gábor Boér	Dabas	
28 July 2004	GK	(Hungary) Viktor Szentpéteri	BKV Előre	
18 August 2004	FW	(Hungary) István Csopaki	BKV Előre	
30 January 2005	FW	(Hungary) László Fekete	(Finland) RoPS	
16 February 2005	MF	(Hungary) György Rézmányi	Szeged	
17 February 2005	MF	(Hungary) Kristóf Bánka	Újpest	

=== Transfers out ===
Date	Pos.	Player	To	Ref
15 February 2005	FW	(Hungary) István Kocsis	Békéscsaba	
16 February 2005	FW	(Hungary) Franck Matondo	Fót	

=== Loans in ===
Start date	End date	Pos.	Player	From	Ref
1 July 2004	End of season	DF	(Hungary) Tamás Németh	Újpest	

=== Loans out ===
Start date	End date	Pos.	Player	To	Ref

== Competitions ==
=== Overview ===
Competition	First match	Last match	Starting round	Final position	Record							
Competition	First match	Last match	Starting round	Final position	Pld	W	D	L	GF	GA	GD	Win %
Nemzeti Bajnokság II	22 August 2004	12 June 2005	Matchday 1	2nd	26	15	8	3	42	18	+24	57.69
Magyar Kupa	22 September 2004	22 September 2004	Second round	Second round	1	0	0	1	2	3	−1	0.00
Total					27	15	8	4	44	21	+23	55.56

Source: Competitions

=== Nemzeti Bajnokság II ===
==== League table ====
Pos	Team	Pld	W	D	L	GF	GA	GD	Pts	Qualification or relegation
1	Tatabánya (C, P)	26	19	5	2	74	19	+55	62	Promotion to Nemzeti Bajnokság I
2	Rákospalota (P)	26	15	8	3	42	18	+24	53	Promotion to Nemzeti Bajnokság I
3	Vác	26	13	3	10	39	38	+1	42	
4	Kecskemét	26	11	7	8	45	36	+9	40	
5	Dunaújváros	26	11	3	12	43	46	−3	36	

Source: Magyarfutball
(C) Champions; (P) Promoted

==== Results summary ====
Overall								Home						Away					
Pld	W	D	L	GF	GA	GD	Pts	W	D	L	GF	GA	GD	W	D	L	GF	GA	GD
26	15	8	3	42	18	+24	53	8	3	2	23	9	+14	7	5	1	19	9	+10

Source: HFF

==== Matches ====
22 August 2004 1	Rákospalota	4–0	Orosháza	Budapest
17:30 CEST (UTC+2)		Report		Stadium: Budai II. László Stadion; Attendance: 500; Referee: Mihály Fábián

28 August 2004 2	Bodajk	0–1	Rákospalota	Bodajk
17:30 CEST (UTC+2)	Miklósvári (yellow card) 7'	Report		Stadium: Kastélykerti Stadion; Attendance: 300

11 September 2004 4	Haladás	0–3	Rákospalota	Szombathely
19:00 CEST (UTC+2)	Kozmor (yellow card) 59'; Balassa (yellow card) 68'; M. Baráth (red card) 81'; T. Balogh (yellow card) 90'	Report	Csopaki (yellow card) 34', (goal) 79'; Kocsis (yellow card) 49', (goal) 56'; Felföldi (yellow card) 54'; T. Mihályi (yellow card) 65'; B. Kovács 73'	Stadium: Rohonci úti Stadion; Attendance: 1,000; Referee: Péter Solymosi

15 September 2004 3	Rákospalota	3–1	Szeged	Budapest
16:30 CEST (UTC+2)		Report		Stadium: Budai II. László Stadion; Attendance: 800; Referee: Attila Hanacsek
Note: Postponed

19 September 2004 5	Rákospalota	4–2	Hévíz	Budapest
16:00 CEST (UTC+2)		Report		Stadium: Budai II. László Stadion; Attendance: 1,000; Referee: Attila Dubraviczky

26 September 2004 6	Makó	0–0	Rákospalota	Makó
16:00 CEST (UTC+2)		Report		Stadium: Erdei Ferenc téri Sporttelep; Attendance: 600; Referee: János Makai Jr.

3 October 2004 7	Rákospalota	1–3	Tatabánya	Budapest
15:00 CEST (UTC+2)		Report	Márkus 3', 29'; Forgó 20'	Stadium: Budai II. László Stadion; Attendance: 800; Referee: Csaba Imre Sápi

10 October 2004 8	Rákospalota	3–1	Vác	Budapest
15:00 CEST (UTC+2)		Report		Stadium: Budai II. László Stadion; Attendance: 800

17 October 2004 9	Mosonmagyaróvár	1–2	Rákospalota	Mosonmagyaróvár
14:30 CEST (UTC+2)		Report		Stadium: Wittmann Antal park Attendance: 900; Referee: István Vad

24 October 2004 10	Rákospalota	1–0	Kecskemét	Budapest
14:30 CEST (UTC+2)		Report		Stadium: Budai II. László Stadion; Attendance: 1,000; Referee: Mihály Fábián

31 October 2004 11	Szolnok	1–1	Rákospalota	Szolnok
13:30 CET (UTC+1)		Report		Stadium: Tiszaligeti Stadion; Attendance: 400; Referee: Péter Solymosi

6 November 2004 12	Rákospalota	3–1	Dunaújváros	Budapest
11:30 CET (UTC+1)		Report		Stadium: Budai II. László Stadion; Attendance: 800; Referee: Zoltán Szarka

10 November 2004 13	BKV Előre	1–3	Rákospalota	Budapest
13:30 CET (UTC+1)	T. Mihályi 7' (o.g.); A. Molnár (yellow card) 16'; Török (yellow card) 60'	Report	Csopaki 9'; B. Kovács 11' (pen.); Nyerges 19'; G. Horváth (yellow card) 35'	Stadium: Sport utcai stadion Attendance: 300; Referee: Attila Hanacsek

19 March 2005 14	Orosháza	1–1	Rákospalota	Orosháza
14:30 CET (UTC+1)		Report		Stadium: Mátrai- Stadion; Attendance: 300; Referee: Csaba Imre Sápi

27 March 2005 15	Rákospalota	0–0	Bodajk	Budapest
16:00 CEST (UTC+2)		Report		Stadium: Budai II. László Stadion; Attendance: 1,000; Referee: János Makai Jr.

3 April 2005 16	Szeged	1–1	Rákospalota	Szeged
16:30 CEST (UTC+2)		Report		Stadium: Felső Tisza-parti Stadion; Attendance: 300; Referee: János Megyebíró

10 April 2005 17	Rákospalota	0–0	Haladás	Budapest
16:30 CEST (UTC+2)	Gál (yellow card) 45'; Havrán (yellow card) 84'	Report	G. Borsi (yellow card) 10'; Czeglédi (yellow card) 70'	Stadium: Budai II. László Stadion; Attendance: 800; Referee: Attila Ábrahám

17 April 2005 18	Hévíz	1–2	Rákospalota	Hévíz
17:00 CEST (UTC+2)		Report		Stadium: Kossuth Lajos utcai pálya Attendance: 500; Referee: András Sóthy

24 April 2005 19	Rákospalota	1–0	Makó	Budapest
17:00 CEST (UTC+2)		Report		Stadium: Budai II. László Stadion; Attendance: 800; Referee: Péter Solymosi

30 April 2005 20	Tatabánya	0–0	Rákospalota	Tatabánya
17:00 CEST (UTC+2)		Report		Stadium: Grosics Gyula Stadion; Attendance: 1,800; Referee: Ferenc Bede

7 May 2005 21	Vác	0–2	Rákospalota	Vác
18:00 CEST (UTC+2)		Report		Stadium: Ligeti Stadion; Attendance: 500; Referee: Attila Hanacsek

15 May 2005 22	Rákospalota	3–0	Mosonmagyaróvár	Budapest
17:30 CEST (UTC+2)		Report		Stadium: Budai II. László Stadion; Attendance: 1,200; Referee: Mihály Fábián

20 May 2005 23	Kecskemét	2–1	Rákospalota	Kecskemét
19:20 CEST (UTC+2)		Report		Stadium: Széktói Stadion; Attendance: 300; Referee: Tamás Arany

28 May 2005 24	Rákospalota	0–1	Szolnok	Budapest
18:00 CEST (UTC+2)		Report		Stadium: Budai II. László Stadion; Attendance: 700; Referee: András Sóthy

5 June 2005 25	Dunaújváros	1–2	Rákospalota	Dunaújváros
18:00 CEST (UTC+2)		Report		Stadium: Eszperantó úti Stadion; Attendance: 1,500

12 June 2005 26	Rákospalota	0–0	BKV Előre	Budapest
18:00 CEST (UTC+2)		Report		Stadium: Budai II. László Stadion; Attendance: 2,000; Referee: Sándor Gergely

=== Magyar Kupa ===
22 September 2004 Second round	Felcsút	3–2	Rákospalota	Felcsút
	Móri; I. Varga; G. Földes		B. Kovács (pen.); T. Mihályi; Cseri (yellow card); G. Horváth (yellow card); Virágh (yellow card); Boér (yellow card)	Stadium: Felcsút Sporttelep; Attendance: 400; Referee: Balázs Világi

== Statistics ==
=== Appearances and goals ===
Pos.	Nat.	Player	Nemzeti Bajnokság II		Magyar Kupa		Total	
Pos.	Nat.	Player	Apps	Goals	Apps	Goals	Apps	Goals
MF	(Hungary)	Kristóf Bánka	8	2			8	2
MF	(Hungary)	Gábor Boér	3		1		4	
DF	(Hungary)	Gergő Cseri	22	3	1		23	3
FW	(Hungary)	István Csopaki	24	9	1		25	9
DF	(Hungary)	Balázs Dinka	20				20	
GK	(Hungary)	Balázs Farkas	21				21	
FW	(Hungary)	László Fekete	12				12	
MF	(Hungary)	Csaba Felföldi	17		1		18	
DF	(Hungary)	István Gál	10				10	
FW	(Hungary)	József Havrán	15	4			15	4
DF	(Hungary)	Gábor Horváth	23		1		24	
DF	(Hungary)	Tamás Horváth	17				17	
MF	(Hungary)	Vince Kapcsos	23	3	1		24	3
FW	(Hungary)	István Kocsis	7	3	1		8	3
MF	(Hungary)	Balázs Kovács	24	8	1	1	25	9
FW	(Hungary)	Franck Matondo	1				1	
DF	(Hungary)	Tamás Mihályi	11		1	1	12	1
FW	(Hungary)	Gábor Nagy II	11	2	1		12	2
DF	(Hungary)	Tamás Németh	13				13	
FW	(Hungary)	Krisztián Nyerges	22	8	1		23	8
MF	(Hungary)	György Rézmányi	7				7	
GK	(Hungary)	Viktor Szentpéteri	5		1		6	
DF	(Hungary)	Zoltán Vati	20		1		21	
DF	(Hungary)	Tibor Virágh	25		1		26	
