= Vince Kapcsos =

Hungarian footballer (born 1981)

Personal information
- Date of birth: 15 October 1981 (age 45)
- Place of birth: Budapest, Hungary
- Height: 1.83 m (6 ft 0 in)
- Position: Midfielder

Youth career
- –2000: Vasas
- 2001: Újpest

Senior career*
Years	Team	Apps	(Gls)
2000–2001	Kiskőrös	23	(4)
2001–2002	Újpest	0	(0)
2002	Eger	2	(0)
2002–2003	Újpest-Fót	33	(8)
2003–2004	Újpest	4	(0)
2004–2010	Rákospalota	149	(10)
2011–2014	Scheibbs	97	(43)
2014–2018	Purgstall	98	(30)
2018–2019	Kienberg/Gaming	13	(5)
2019	Hochneukirchen	13	(3)
Total		432	(103)

International career
2005	Hungary	1	(0)
- * Club domestic league appearances and goals

Vince Kapcsos (born 15 October 1981) is a Hungarian former professional footballer who played as a midfielder. He played in the Nemzeti Bajnokság I for Újpest and Rákospalota, earning his only international cap for Hungary while playing for the latter, in a friendly against Antigua and Barbuda in 2005.

== Club career ==
=== Újpest ===
On 8 November 2003, Kapcsos debuted in the Nemzeti Bajnokság I for Újpest in a 1–1 away draw against Sopron.

=== Rákospalota ===
On 22 August 2004, he made his debut for Nemzeti Bajnokság II side Rákospalota in a 4–0 home victory over Orosháza. On 19 September, he scored a brace—his first goals for REAC—in a 4–2 home victory over Hévíz.

== International career ==
Kapcsos was called up to the Hungary squad for the first time on 4 November 2005 for the international friendly against Greece.

On 11 December 2005, he received his second call-up to the squad by Lothar Matthäus, this time to face Mexico and Haiti in the United States on 15 and 18 December 2005, respectively. Later, the second opponent was changed to Antigua and Barbuda, where Kapcsos made his debut in the 80th minute, and the match ended 3–0 in favour of Hungary.

== Career statistics ==
=== Club ===
Appearances and goals by club, season and competition
Club	Season	League			National cup (Note: Includes Magyar Kupa, Austrian Cup)		League cup (Note: Includes Ligakupa)		Other		Total	
Club	Season	Division	Apps	Goals	Apps	Goals	Apps	Goals	Apps	Goals	Apps	Goals
Kiskőrös	2000–01	Nemzeti Bajnokság II	9	0	—		—		—		9	0
Kiskőrös	2000–01	Nemzeti Bajnokság III	14	4	—		—		—		14	4
Kiskőrös	Total		23	4	—		—		—		23	4
Eger	2001–02	Nemzeti Bajnokság II	2	0	—		—		—		2	0
Újpest-Fót	2002–03	Nemzeti Bajnokság II	33	8	2	0	—		—		35	8
Újpest	2003–04	Nemzeti Bajnokság I	4	0	—		—		—		4	0
Rákospalota	2004–05	Nemzeti Bajnokság II	23	3	1	0	—		—		24	3
Rákospalota	2005–06	Nemzeti Bajnokság I	28	0	3	0	—		—		31	0
Rákospalota	2006–07	Nemzeti Bajnokság I	24	1	4	1	—		—		28	2
Rákospalota	2007–08	Nemzeti Bajnokság I	26	1	2	0	10	2	—		38	3
Rákospalota	2008–09	Nemzeti Bajnokság I	23	1	4	1	7	3	—		34	5
Rákospalota	2009–10	Nemzeti Bajnokság II	25	4	2	0	—		—		27	4
Rákospalota	Total		149	10	16	2	17	5	—		182	17
Scheibbs	2010–11	1. Klasse West	14	10	—		—		—		14	10
Scheibbs	2011–12	1. Klasse West	25	13	—		—		—		25	13
Scheibbs	2012–13	1. Klasse West	30	12	—		—		—		30	12
Scheibbs	2013–14	1. Klasse West	28	8	—		—		—		28	8
Scheibbs	Total		97	43	—		—		—		97	43
Purgstall	2014–15	2. Klasse Alpenvorland	21	11	—		—		—		21	11
Purgstall	2015–16	1. Klasse West	26	6	—		—		5 (Note: Appearances in Lower Austrian Football Cup)	0	31	6
Purgstall	2016–17	Gebietsliga West	25	7	1	0	—		—		26	7
Purgstall	2017–18	Gebietsliga West	26	6	—		—		—		26	6
Purgstall	Total		98	30	1	0	—		5	0	104	30
Kienberg/Gaming	2018–19	2. Klasse Alpenvorland	13	5	—		—		—		13	5
Hochneukirchen	2018–19	2. Klasse Wechsel	13	3	—		—		—		13	3
Career total			432	103	19	2	17	5	5	0	473	110

=== International ===
Appearances and goals by national team and year
National team	Year	Apps	Goals
Hungary	2005	1	0
Total		1	0

== Honours ==
Purgstall

- 1. Klasse West: 2015–16
- 2. Klasse Alpenvorland: 2014–15
- Lower Austrian Football Cup: 2015–16
