= Tamás Koltai =

Tamás Koltai may refer to:

- Tamás Koltai (footballer, born 1977), Hungarian youth international footballer for Vasas, Maccabi Akhi Nazareth, 1. FC Saarbrücken, Pécs, Johor and Rákospalota
- Tamás Koltai (footballer, born 1987), Hungarian international footballer for Győr, Videoton and Paks
