= Tibor Virágh =

Hungarian footballer (born 1977)

Personal information
- Date of birth: 20 October 1977 (age 49)
- Place of birth: Miskolc, Hungary
- Height: 1.83 m (6 ft 0 in)
- Position: Defender

Youth career
- 1986–1994: Tiszaújváros

Senior career*
Years	Team	Apps	(Gls)
1994–1997	Tiszaújváros	53	(0)
1997–2008	Rákospalota	215	(5)
2000–2001	→ Örkény (loan)	5	(0)
2009–2010	Budakalász II	6	(1)
Total		279	(6)
- * Club domestic league appearances and goals

Tibor Virágh (born 20 October 1977) is a Hungarian former professional footballer, who played as a defender.

== Career ==
As a player of Tiszaújváros in the Nemzeti Bajnokság III, Virágh contributed to the club's success, culminating in winning the Tisza group in 1997. This achievement followed a steady improvement from a third-place finish in 1995 to a runner-up position in 1996, before reaching first place in 1997.

Following its historic promotion to the Nemzeti Bajnokság I in the previous season, Rákospalota reached a verbal agreement with him to continue wearing the club's blue-and-yellow colors, with club officials also verbally agreeing with other players whose contracts were expiring. Virágh was included in Rákospalota's finalized squad for the new season.

== Career statistics ==
Appearances and goals by club, season and competition
Club	Season	League			Magyar Kupa		Ligakupa		Other		Total	
Club	Season	Division	Apps	Goals	Apps	Goals	Apps	Goals	Apps	Goals	Apps	Goals
Tiszaújváros	1994–95	Nemzeti Bajnokság III	2	0	—		—		—		2	0
Tiszaújváros	1995–96	Nemzeti Bajnokság III	26	0	—		—		—		26	0
Tiszaújváros	1996–97	Nemzeti Bajnokság III	25	0	—		—		2 (Note: Appearances in Nemzeti Bajnokság III promotion play-offs)	0	27	0
Tiszaújváros	Total		53	0	—		—		2	0	55	0
Rákospalota	1997–98	Nemzeti Bajnokság III	27	1	—		—		—		27	1
Rákospalota	1998–99	Nemzeti Bajnokság III	23	0	—		—		—		23	0
Rákospalota	1999–2000	Nemzeti Bajnokság III	13	0	3	0	—		—		16	0
Rákospalota	1999–2000	Nemzeti Bajnokság II	17	0	—		—		—		17	0
Rákospalota	2000–01	Nemzeti Bajnokság II	17	0	—		—		—		17	0
Rákospalota	2001–02	Nemzeti Bajnokság II	25	1	3	1	—		—		28	2
Rákospalota	2002–03	Nemzeti Bajnokság II	28	3	1	0	—		—		29	3
Rákospalota	2003–04	Nemzeti Bajnokság II	23	0	—		—		1 (Note: Appearance in Nemzeti Bajnokság I promotion play-offs)	0	24	0
Rákospalota	2004–05	Nemzeti Bajnokság II	25	0	1	0	—		—		26	0
Rákospalota	2005–06	Nemzeti Bajnokság I	14	0	2	0	—		—		16	0
Rákospalota	2006–07	Nemzeti Bajnokság I	3	0	2	0	—		—		5	0
Rákospalota	2007–08	Nemzeti Bajnokság I	0	0	1	0	1	0	—		2	0
Rákospalota	Total		215	5	13	1	1	0	1	0	230	6
Örkény (loan)	2000–01	Nemzeti Bajnokság III	5	0	2	0	—		—		7	0
Budakalász II	2009–10	Megyei Bajnokság IV	6	1	—		—		—		6	1
Career total			279	6	15	1	1	0	3	0	298	7

== Honours ==
Tiszaújváros

- Nemzeti Bajnokság III – Tisza: 1996–97

Budakalász II

- Megyei Bajnokság IV – Pest Szentendre group: 2009–10
