= István Kocsis =

István Kocsis may refer to:

- István Kocsis (footballer, born 1949) (1949–1994), Hungarian international footballer for Pécs, Honvéd and Lierse
- István Kocsis (footballer, born 1976), Hungarian footballer for Haladás, Nyírség-Spartacus/Nyíregyháza, Nagykanizsa and Békéscsaba
