= József Havrán =

Hungarian footballer (born 1978)

Personal information
- Date of birth: 14 May 1978 (age 48)
- Place of birth: Budapest, Hungary
- Height: 1.87 m (6 ft 2 in)
- Position: Striker

Senior career*
Years	Team	Apps	(Gls)
1995–2000	Vác	15	(2)
1997	→ Hatvan (loan)	3	(0)
1998–1999	→ Palotás (loan)	1	(0)
2000–2002	Videoton	0	(0)
2000–2001	→ Siófok (loan)	29	(6)
2001–2002	→ Dorog (loan)	9	(0)
2002	→ Fót (loan)	12	(5)
2002–2003	Balassagyarmat	34	(21)
2003–2005	Rákospalota	47	(14)
2005–2007	Soroksár	38	(14)
2007	Dabas	5	(3)
2007–2009	Százhalombatta	46	(35)
2009–2011	Biatorbágy	31	(32)
2011–2012	Pilis Sport	28	(14)
2012	Veresegyház	16	(9)
Total		314	(155)
- * Club domestic league appearances and goals

József Havrán (born 14 May 1978) is a Hungarian former professional footballer who played as a striker. He was the top scorer in three different tiers.

== Career ==
On 3 November 1995, Havrán signed with Nemzeti Bajnokság I club Vác.

In February 1997, he was sent out on loan to Nemzeti Bajnokság II club Hatvan for the second half of the season.

In April 1998, Havrán returned to Vác following his military service. On 30 May, he made his Nemzeti Bajnokság I debut in a 3–1 home win over Stadler.

In June 2000, he was close to signing with Nemzeti Bajnokság I side Vasas, but did not attend the medical examination and instead reached an agreement with Videoton.

Havrán was the top goalscorer in the Nemzeti Bajnokság II in the 2002–03 season, scoring 21 goals for Balassagyarmat. (Note: 23 goals were originally credited to Havrán, but his tally was reduced to 21 after Vasas and Demecser were excluded from the league and their results were annulled.)

On 23 June 2003, he was signed as a replacement for Attila Polonkai by Nemzeti Bajnokság II club Rákospalota. He left the club after the club's historic promotion to the top-flight.

== Career statistics ==
Appearances and goals by club, season and competition
Club	Season	League			Magyar Kupa		Other		Total	
Club	Season	Division	Apps	Goals	Apps	Goals	Apps	Goals	Apps	Goals
Vác	1996–97	Nemzeti Bajnokság I	—		2	0	—		2	0
Vác	1997–98	Nemzeti Bajnokság I	2	0	—		—		2	0
Vác	1999–2000	Nemzeti Bajnokság I	13	2	—		—		13	2
Vác	Total		15	2	2	0	—		17	2
Hatvan (loan)	1996–97	Nemzeti Bajnokság II	3	0	—		—		3	0
Palotás (loan)	1998–99	Nemzeti Bajnokság III	1	0	1	2	—		2	2
Videoton	2000–01	Nemzeti Bajnokság I	—		1	0	—		1	0
Siófok (loan)	2000–01	Nemzeti Bajnokság II	29	6	3	2	—		32	8
Dorog (loan)	2001–02	Nemzeti Bajnokság II	9	0	—		—		9	0
Fót (loan)	2001–02	Nemzeti Bajnokság II	12	5	—		—		12	5
Balassagyarmat	2002–03	Nemzeti Bajnokság II	34	21	—		—		34	21
Rákospalota	2003–04	Nemzeti Bajnokság II	32	10	1	0	2 (Note: Appearances in Nemzeti Bajnokság I promotion play-offs)	0	35	10
Rákospalota	2004–05	Nemzeti Bajnokság II	15	4	—		—		15	4
Rákospalota	Total		47	14	1	0	2	0	50	14
Soroksár	2005–06	Nemzeti Bajnokság II	27	13	—		—		27	13
Soroksár	2006–07	Nemzeti Bajnokság II	11	1	2	2	—		13	3
Soroksár	Total		38	14	2	2	—		40	16
Dabas	2006–07	Nemzeti Bajnokság III	5	3	—		—		5	3
Százhalombatta	2007–08	Nemzeti Bajnokság III	24	28	—		2 (Note: Appearances in Pest Megyei Kupa)	1	26	29
Százhalombatta	2008–09	Nemzeti Bajnokság II	22	7	2	0	—		24	7
Százhalombatta	Total		46	35	2	0	2	1	50	36
Biatorbágy	2009–10	Megyei Bajnokság I	20	28	—		2	2	22	30
Biatorbágy	2010–11	Nemzeti Bajnokság III	11	4	—		5 (Note: One appearance in Pest Megyei Szuperkupa, four appearances and two goal in Pest Megyei Kupa)	2	16	6
Biatorbágy	Total		31	32	—		7	4	38	36
Pilis sport	2010–11	Megyei Bajnokság I	15	9	—		—		15	9
Pilis sport	2011–12	Nemzeti Bajnokság III	13	5	—		2	3	15	8
Pilis sport	Total		28	14	—		2	3	30	17
Veresegyház	2011–12	Megyei Bajnokság I	12	7	—		—		12	7
Veresegyház	2012–13	Megyei Bajnokság I	4	2	—		—		4	2
Veresegyház	Total		16	9	—		—		16	9
Career total			314	155	12	6	13	8	339	169

== Honours ==
Videoton

- Magyar Kupa runner-up: 2000–01

Százhalombatta

- Nemzeti Bajnokság III – Duna: 2007–08

Biatorbágy

- Megyei Bajnokság I – Pest: 2009–10
- Pest Megyei Szuperkupa runner-up: 2010

Veresegyház

- Megyei Bajnokság I – Pest: 2012–13

Individual

- Nemzeti Bajnokság II top scorer: 2002–03
- Nemzeti Bajnokság III – Duna top scorer: 2007–08
- Megyei Bajnokság I – Pest top scorer: 2009–10
