= Sándor Török (footballer) =

Hungarian footballer (born 1981)

Personal information
- Date of birth: 7 August 1981 (age 45)
- Place of birth: Mátészalka, Hungary
- Height: 1.66 m (5 ft 5 in)
- Position: Forward

Youth career
- Nyíregyháza
- –2000: MTK

Senior career*
Years	Team	Apps	(Gls)
1999–2000	MTK	0	(0)
2000–2005	BKV Előre	147	(18)
2005–2007	Rákospalota	49	(4)
2007–2008	Felcsút	14	(1)
2008–2010	BKV Előre	69	(7)
2010–2012	Mezőkövesd	26	(0)
2012	Vecsés	15	(2)
2012–2014	Jászapáti	50	(6)
2014–2015	Csomád	22	(10)
2015–2016	Cso-Ki Sport	29	(3)
2016–2018	Kisnémedi	39	(10)
2018–2020	Nagyecsed	48	(5)
2020–2021	Nyírmeggyes	28	(5)
Total		536	(71)

International career
1996	Hungary U15	4	(0)
1998–1999	Hungary U17	11	(0)
1999	Hungary U18	3	(0)
2001	Hungary U19	1	(0)
- * Club domestic league appearances and goals

Sándor Török (born 7 August 1981) is a Hungarian former professional footballer, who played as a striker. He represented Hungary at youth level.

== Career ==
Török made an appearance in the UEFA Intertoto Cup while simultaneously taking part in a trial with Sopron; however, the club ultimately chose not to offer him a contract.

On 29 July 2007, Török departed Nemzeti Bajnokság I side Rákospalota, alongside teammate Balázs Schrancz, and transferred to Felcsút, then competing in the Nemzeti Bajnokság II.

On 8 July 2010, Nemzeti Bajnokság II club Mezőkövesd announced on their website that they had signed him until 30 June 2013. On 8 February 2012, the club announced that he was among the players leaving Mezőkövesd.

== Career statistics ==
=== Club ===
Appearances and goals by club, season and competition
Club	Season	League			Magyar Kupa		Ligakupa		Europe		Other		Total	
Club	Season	Division	Apps	Goals	Apps	Goals	Apps	Goals	Apps	Goals	Apps	Goals	Apps	Goals
MTK	1999–2000	Nemzeti Bajnokság I	—		1	0	—		—		—		1	0
BKV Előre	1999–2000	Nemzeti Bajnokság II	19	4	—		—		—		—		19	4
BKV Előre	2000–01	Nemzeti Bajnokság II	25	2	5	2	—		—		—		30	4
BKV Előre	2001–02	Nemzeti Bajnokság II	12	0	2	1	—		—		—		14	1
BKV Előre	2002–03	Nemzeti Bajnokság II	32	2	4	1	—		—		—		36	3
BKV Előre	2003–04	Nemzeti Bajnokság II	34	3	4	1	—		—		—		38	4
BKV Előre	2004–05	Nemzeti Bajnokság II	25	7	6	2	—		—		—		31	9
BKV Előre	Total		147	18	21	7	—		—		—		168	25
Sopron	2004–05	Nemzeti Bajnokság I	—		—		—		1 (Note: Appearance in UEFA Intertoto Cup)	0	—		1	0
Rákospalota	2005–06	Nemzeti Bajnokság I	28	4	4	1	—		—		—		32	5
Rákospalota	2006–07	Nemzeti Bajnokság I	21	0	4	0	—		—		—		25	0
Rákospalota	Total		49	4	8	1	—		—		—		57	5
Felcsút	2007–08	Nemzeti Bajnokság II	14	1	2	0	—		—		—		16	1
BKV Előre	2007–08	Nemzeti Bajnokság II	14	4	—		—		—		—		14	4
BKV Előre	2008–09	Nemzeti Bajnokság II	28	1	1	0	—		—		—		29	1
BKV Előre	2009–10	Nemzeti Bajnokság II	27	2	1	0	—		—		—		28	2
BKV Előre	Total		69	7	2	0	—		—		—		71	7
Mezőkövesd	2010–11	Nemzeti Bajnokság II	21	0	0	0	—		—		—		21	0
Mezőkövesd	2011–12	Nemzeti Bajnokság II	5	0	2	0	5	1	—		—		12	1
Mezőkövesd	Total		26	0	2	0	5	1	—		—		33	1
Vecsés	2011–12	Nemzeti Bajnokság II	15	2	—		—		—		—		15	2
Jászapáti	2012–13	Nemzeti Bajnokság III	25	5	2	1	—		—		3 (Note: Two appearances in Jász–Nagykun–Szolnok Megyei Kupa, one appearance in Nemzeti Bajnokság III relegation play-offs)	0	30	6
Jászapáti	2013–14	Nemzeti Bajnokság III	25	1	—		—		—		—		25	1
Jászapáti	Total		50	6	2	1	—		—		3	0	55	7
Csomád	2014–15	Megyei Bajnokság II	22	10	—		—		—		4 (Note: Appearances in Pest Megyei Kupa)	2	26	12
Cso-Ki Sport	2015–16	Megyei Bajnokság I	29	3	—		—		—		4 (Note: One appearance in Magyar Kupa qualifying rounds, three appearances and three goals in Pest Megyei Kupa)	3	33	6
Kisnémedi	2016–17	Megyei Bajnokság I	27	4	—		—		—		3 (Note: One appearance in Magyar Kupa qualifying rounds, two appearances and one goal in Pest Megyei Kupa)	1	30	5
Kisnémedi	2017–18	Megyei Bajnokság II	12	6	—		—		—		3 (Note: Appearances in Magyar Kupa qualifying rounds)	0	15	6
Kisnémedi	Total		39	10	—		—		—		6	1	45	11
Nagyecsed	2017–18	Megyei Bajnokság I	11	0	—		—		—		—		11	0
Nagyecsed	2018–19	Megyei Bajnokság I	22	3	—		—		—		2	0	24	3
Nagyecsed	2019–20	Megyei Bajnokság I	15	2	1	0	—		—		3	1	19	3
Nagyecsed	Total		48	5	1	0	—		—		5	1	54	6
Nyírmeggyes	2019–20	Megyei Bajnokság I	3	0	—		—		—		—		3	0
Nyírmeggyes	2020–21	Megyei Bajnokság I	25	5	—		—		—		1	1	26	6
Nyírmeggyes	Total		28	5	—		—		—		1	1	29	6
Career total			536	71	39	9	5	1	1	0	23	8	604	89

=== International ===
Appearances and goals by national team and year
Team	Year	Total	
Team	Year	Apps	Goals
Hungary U15	1996	4	0
Hungary U17	1998	8	0
Hungary U17	1999	3	0
Hungary U17	Total	11	0
Hungary U18	1999	3	0
Hungary U19	2001	1	0
Career total		19	0

== Honours ==
MTK

- Magyar Kupa: 1999–2000

BKV Előre

- Nemzeti Bajnokság II: 2000–01

Csomád

- Megyei Bajnokság II – Pest: 2014–15

Nagyecsed

- Megyei Bajnokság I – Szabolcs-Szatmár-Bereg: 2018–19
