= Tamás Koltai (footballer, born 1977) =

Hungarian footballer

Personal information
- Date of birth: 6 January 1977 (age 49)
- Place of birth: Budapest, Hungary
- Height: 1.82 m (6 ft 0 in)
- Position: Striker

Youth career
- Vasas

Senior career*
Years	Team	Apps	(Gls)
1994–1999	Vasas	32	(2)
1994–1995	→ Gyöngyös (loan)	10	(6)
1999–2000	Maccabi Akhi Nazareth		
2000–2001	Rákospalota	46	(27)
2001–2003	1. FC Saarbrücken	37	(4)
2003–2004	Maccabi Akhi Nazareth		
2004	Pécs	15	(2)
2004–2005	Johor		
2005–2006	Anker Wismar	5	(2)
2006–2007	Rákospalota	3	(0)
2007	Budafok	9	(0)
2007	Tulln		
Total		157	(43)

International career
1997	Hungary U21	3	(0)
1997	Hungary U23	1	(0)
- * Club domestic league appearances and goals

Tamás Koltai (born 6 January 1977) is a Hungarian former professional footballer, who played as a striker.

== Career ==
In January 2004, Nemzeti Bajnokság I club Pécs signed Koltai to a one-and-a-half-year contract after he returned to Hungary from Israel in December 2003, where he had played for Israeli Premier League side Maccabi Akhi Nazareth. Before joining Pécs, Koltai was also pursued by Békéscsaba.

== Career statistics ==
=== Club ===
Appearances and goals by club, season and competition
Club	Season	League			National cup (Note: Includes Magyar Kupa, DFB-Pokal)		Continental		Total	
Club	Season	Division	Apps	Goals	Apps	Goals	Apps	Goals	Apps	Goals
Gyöngyös (loan)	1994–95	Nemzeti Bajnokság III	10	6	—		—		10	6
Vasas	1995–96	Nemzeti Bajnokság I	1	0	1	0	—		2	0
Vasas	1996–97	Nemzeti Bajnokság I	3	0	—		2 (Note: Appearances in UEFA Intertoto Cup)	1	5	1
Vasas	1997–98	Nemzeti Bajnokság I	13	1	2	1	3	0	18	2
Vasas	1998–99	Nemzeti Bajnokság I	15	1	2	2	—		17	3
Vasas	Total		32	2	5	3	5	1	42	6
Maccabi Akhi Nazareth	1999–2000	Liga Leumit					—			
Rákospalota	2000–01	Nemzeti Bajnokság II	31	10	—		—		31	10
Rákospalota	2001–02	Nemzeti Bajnokság II	15	17	—		—		15	17
Rákospalota	Total		46	27	—		—		46	27
1. FC Saarbrücken	2001–02	2. Bundesliga	21	4	—		—		21	4
1. FC Saarbrücken	2002–03	Regionalliga Süd	16	0	1	0	—		17	0
1. FC Saarbrücken	Total		37	4	1	0	—		38	4
Maccabi Akhi Nazareth	2002–03	Liga Leumit					—			
Maccabi Akhi Nazareth	2003–04	Israeli Premier League					—			
Maccabi Akhi Nazareth	Total						—			
Pécs	2003–04	Nemzeti Bajnokság I	15	2	—		—		15	2
Johor	2004	Malaysia Premier League					—			
Johor	2005	Malaysia Premier League					—			
Johor	Total						—			
Anker Wismar	2005–06	NOFV-Oberliga	5	2	—		—		5	2
Rákospalota	2005–06	Nemzeti Bajnokság I	3	0	—		—		3	0
Budafok	2006–07	Nemzeti Bajnokság II	9	0	—		—		9	0
Career total			157	43	6	3	5	1	168	47

=== International ===
Appearances and goals by national team and year
Team	Year	Total	
Team	Year	Apps	Goals
Hungary U21	1997	3	0
Hungary U23	1997	1	0
Career total		4	0

== Honours ==
Maccabi Akhi Nazareth

- Liga Leumit: 2002–03
