= Krisztián Nyerges =

Hungarian footballer (born 1977)

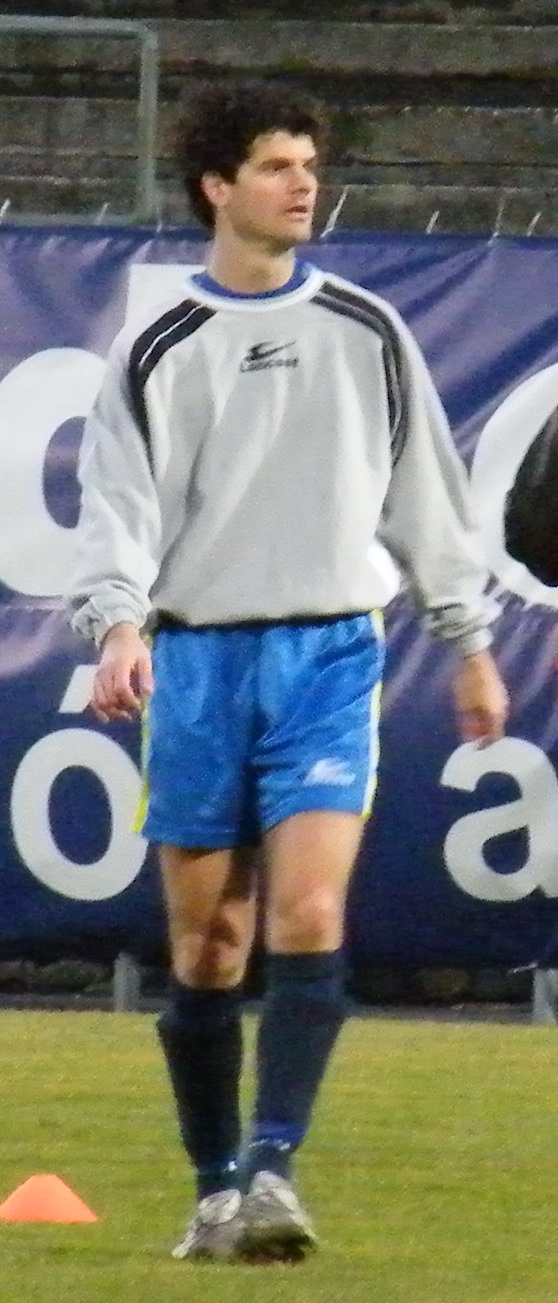
- Nyerges with Rákospalota in 2009

Personal information
- Date of birth: 26 September 1977 (age 49)
- Place of birth: Budapest, Hungary
- Height: 1.86 m (6 ft 1 in)
- Position: Striker

Youth career
- Volán
- Vasas

Senior career*
Years	Team	Apps	(Gls)
1997–2000	Vasas	30	(1)
2000–2001	BVSC	29	(4)
2001–2012	Rákospalota	283	(93)
Total		342	(98)
- * Club domestic league appearances and goals

Krisztián Nyerges (born 26 September 1977) is a Hungarian former professional footballer, who played as a striker.

== Career ==
=== Rákospalota ===
On 18 May 2003, he scored his first hat-trick for Rákospalota in a second division match against Fót.

Nyerges was part of the club's 2005–06 squad that debuted in the highest level of Hungarian football.

== Career statistics ==
Appearances and goals by club, season and competition
Club	Season	League			Magyar Kupa		Ligakupa		Europe		Other		Total	
Club	Season	Division	Apps	Goals	Apps	Goals	Apps	Goals	Apps	Goals	Apps	Goals	Apps	Goals
Vasas	1997–98	Nemzeti Bajnokság I	10	1	1	0	—		—		—		11	1
Vasas	1998–99	Nemzeti Bajnokság I	14	0	2	1	—		—		—		16	1
Vasas	1999–2000	Nemzeti Bajnokság I	6	0	1	0	—		4 (Note: Appearances in UEFA Intertoto Cup)	0	—		11	0
Vasas	Total		30	1	4	1	—		4	0	—		38	2
BVSC	2000–01	Nemzeti Bajnokság II	29	4	5	2	—		—		—		34	6
Rákospalota	2001–02	Nemzeti Bajnokság II	28	6	3	1	—		—		—		31	7
Rákospalota	2002–03	Nemzeti Bajnokság II	33	14	2	1	—		—		—		35	15
Rákospalota	2003–04	Nemzeti Bajnokság II	26	2	1	0	—		—		2 (Note: Appearances in Nemzeti Bajnokság I promotion play-offs)	1	29	3
Rákospalota	2004–05	Nemzeti Bajnokság II	22	8	1	0	—		—		—		23	8
Rákospalota	2005–06	Nemzeti Bajnokság I	28	7	4	4	—		—		—		32	11
Rákospalota	2006–07	Nemzeti Bajnokság I	30	10	3	0	—		—		—		33	10
Rákospalota	2007–08	Nemzeti Bajnokság I	24	8	1	2	5	4	—		—		30	14
Rákospalota	2008–09	Nemzeti Bajnokság I	29	9	4	2	6	0	—		—		39	11
Rákospalota	2009–10	Nemzeti Bajnokság II	28	22	1	1	—		—		—		29	23
Rákospalota	2010–11	Nemzeti Bajnokság II	23	4	1	0	—		—		—		24	4
Rákospalota	2011–12	Nemzeti Bajnokság II	12	3	1	0	—		—		—		13	3
Rákospalota	Total		283	93	22	11	11	4	—		2	1	318	109
Career total			342	98	31	14	11	4	4	0	2	1	390	117

== Honours ==
Vasas

- Magyar Kupa runner-up: 1999–2000

Individual

- Nemzeti Bajnokság II – East top scorer: 2009–10
