= István Kocsis (footballer, born 1976) =

Hungarian footballer

Personal information
- Date of birth: 17 December 1976 (age 49)
- Height: 1.77 m (5 ft 10 in)
- Positions: Midfielder; striker

Senior career*
Years	Team	Apps	(Gls)
1994–1995	Fehérgyarmat	32	(11)
1995–1996	Rakamaz	15	(8)
1996	Vásárosnamény		(6)
1996	Kisvárda	14	(7)
1996–1998	Tiszavasvári	44	(7)
1998–1999	Haladás	26	(2)
1999–2000	BKV Előre	13	(5)
2000	Nyírség-Spartacus	15	(1)
2000–2001	Nagykanizsa	29	(5)
2001–2004	Nyíregyháza	58	(24)
2004–2005	Rákospalota	22	(6)
2005	Békéscsaba	13	(1)
2005–2006	Szolnok	12	(0)
2006–2007	Fehérgyarmat		
2007–2010	Nábrád	32	(27)
2009–2010	→ Fehérgyarmat (loan)	14	(8)
2011	Fülöpszállás	1	(1)
2014	Tiszakóród	7	(1)
2014–2015	Nábrád	22	(11)
2015–2016	Kölcse	14	(0)
2016–2018	Csengersimáért	46	(25)
2018–2020	Nábrád	35	(2)
2020	Kisar	7	(5)
2023	Nábrád	6	(0)
Total		477	(163)
- * Club domestic league appearances and goals

István Kocsis (born 17 December 1976) is a Hungarian former professional footballer who played as a midfielder and striker.

== Career ==
On 3 January 2000, Kocsis committed to the Nemzeti Bajnokság I club Nyírség-Spartacus after spending the previous six months at Nemzeti Bajnokság II side BKV Előre, joining on a free six-month trial basis via his manager.

On 13 January 2004, following his departure from the Nyíregyháza squad during the autumn season, the attacker continued his career with Nemzeti Bajnokság II club Rákospalota.

On 13 December 2004, the executives of second-tier leaders Rákospalota terminated the 28-year-old midfielder's contract due to disappointment with his performances, despite manager Flórián Urbán expressing general satisfaction with the rest of the squad.

Following his release, Kocsis joined Nemzeti Bajnokság I club Békéscsaba alongside Dušan Šimić, though manager László Dajka noted that the signing took place amidst severe financial difficulties at the club.

== Career statistics ==
Appearances and goals by club, season and competition
Club	Season	League			Magyar Kupa		Other		Total	
Club	Season	Division	Apps	Goals	Apps	Goals	Apps	Goals	Apps	Goals
Fehérgyarmat	1994–95	Megyei Bajnokság I	32	11	—		—		32	11
Rakamaz	1995–96	Nemzeti Bajnokság III	15	8	—		—		15	8
Vásárosnamény	1995–96	Megyei Bajnokság I		6	—		—			6
Kisvárda	1996–97	Nemzeti Bajnokság III	14	7	—		—		14	7
Tiszavasvári	1996–97	Nemzeti Bajnokság II	12	1	1	0	—		13	1
Tiszavasvári	1997–98	Nemzeti Bajnokság II	32	6	—		—		32	6
Tiszavasvári	Total		44	7	1	0	—		45	7
Haladás	1998–99	Nemzeti Bajnokság I	26	2	3	1	—		29	3
BKV Előre	1999–2000	Nemzeti Bajnokság II	13	5	3	0	—		16	5
Nyírség-Spartacus	1999–2000	Nemzeti Bajnokság I	15	1	—		—		15	1
Nagykanizsa	2000–01	Nemzeti Bajnokság I	10	0	3	0	—		32	5
Nagykanizsa	2000–01	Nemzeti Bajnokság II	19	5	3	0	—		32	5
Nyíregyháza	2001–02	Nemzeti Bajnokság II	29	19	—		—		29	19
Nyíregyháza	2002–03	Nemzeti Bajnokság II	23	4	1	0	—		24	4
Nyíregyháza	2003–04	Nemzeti Bajnokság II	6	1	2	2	—		8	3
Nyíregyháza	Total		58	24	3	2	—		61	26
Rákospalota	2003–04	Nemzeti Bajnokság II	15	3	—		2 (Note: Appearances in Nemzeti Bajnokság I promotion play-offs)	0	17	3
Rákospalota	2004–05	Nemzeti Bajnokság II	7	3	1	0	—		8	3
Rákospalota	Total		22	6	1	0	2	0	25	6
Békéscsaba	2004–05	Nemzeti Bajnokság I	13	1	—		—		13	1
Szolnok	2005–06	Nemzeti Bajnokság II	12	0	—		—		12	0
Nábrád	2008–09	Megyei Bajnokság II	28	26	—		—		28	26
Nábrád	2009–10	Megyei Bajnokság II	4	1	—		—		4	1
Nábrád	Total		32	27	—		—		32	27
Fehérgyarmat (loan)	2009–10	Megyei Bajnokság I	14	8	—		—		14	8
Fülöpszállás	2011–12	Megyei Bajnokság III	1	1	—		—		1	1
Tiszakóród	2013–14	Megyei Bajnokság II	7	1	—		2 (Note: Appearance(s) in Magyar Kupa qualifying rounds)	0	9	1
Nábrád	2014–15	Megyei Bajnokság III	22	11	—		5	0	27	11
Kölcse	2015–16	Megyei Bajnokság II	14	0	—		1	0	15	0
Csengersimáért	2015–16	Megyei Bajnokság III	12	15	—		—		12	15
Csengersimáért	2016–17	Megyei Bajnokság II	26	8	—		—		26	8
Csengersimáért	2017–18	Megyei Bajnokság II	8	2	—		—		8	2
Csengersimáért	Total		46	25	—		—		46	25
Nábrád	2017–18	Megyei Bajnokság II	11	0	—		—		11	0
Nábrád	2018–19	Megyei Bajnokság II	14	1	—		—		14	1
Nábrád	2019–20	Megyei Bajnokság II	10	1	—		—		10	1
Nábrád	Total		35	2	—		—		35	2
Kisar	2020–21	Megyei Bajnokság III	7	5	—		—		7	5
Nábrád	2023–24	Megyei Bajnokság III	6	0	—		—		6	0
Career total			477	163	14	3	10	0	501	166

== Honours ==
Nábrád

- Megyei Bajnokság III – Szabolcs-Szatmár-Bereg: 2014–15

Csengersimáért

- Megyei Bajnokság III – Szabolcs-Szatmár-Bereg: 2015–16

Individual

- Nemzeti Bajnokság II – East top scorer: 2001–02
