= Gábor Horváth (footballer, born 1983) =

Hungarian footballer

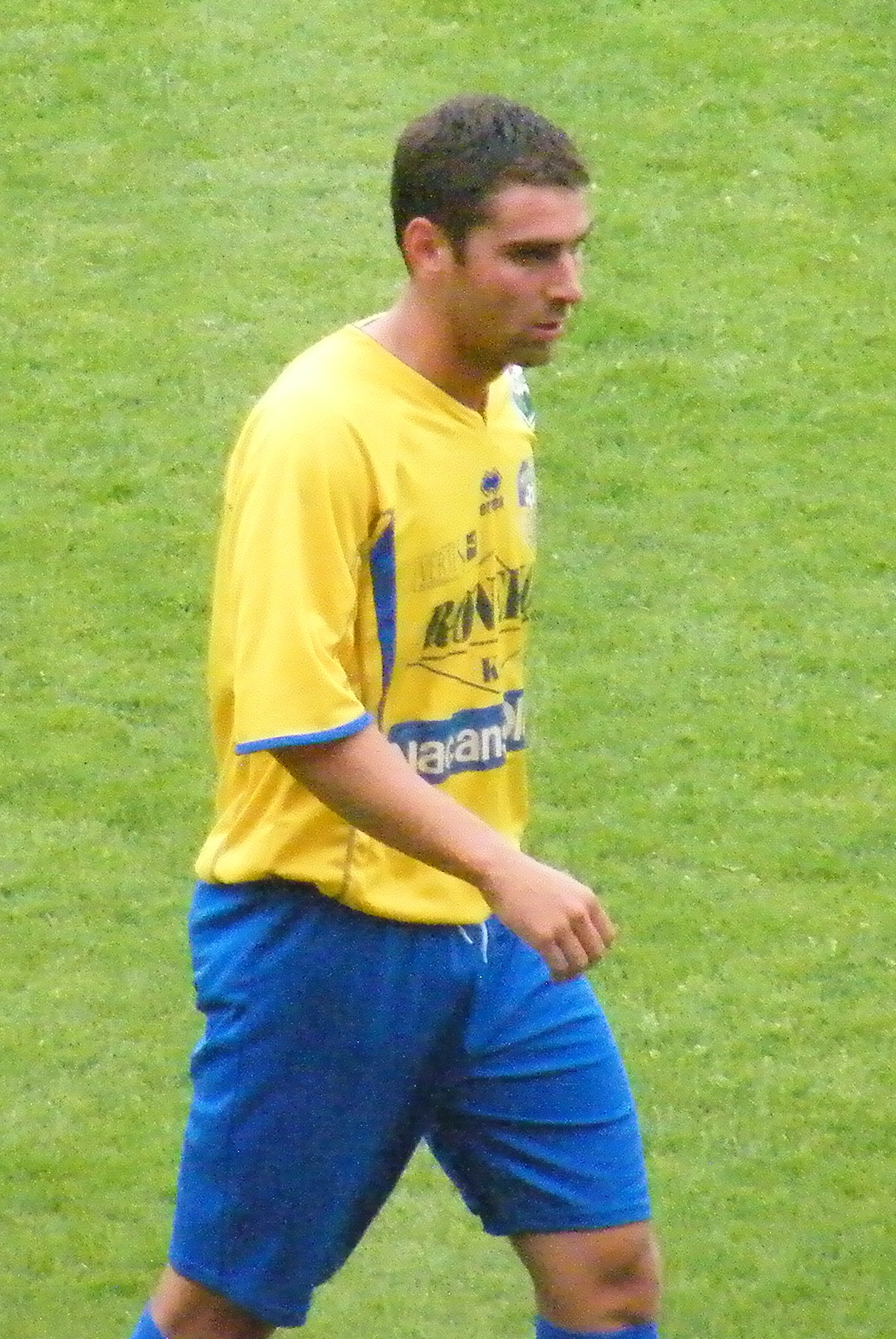
- Horváth playing for Siófok in 2009

Personal information
- Date of birth: 10 July 1983 (age 43)
- Place of birth: Tápiószecső, Hungary
- Height: 1.81 m (5 ft 11 in)
- Position: Defender

Youth career
- 1997–2000: Tápiószecső
- 2000–2002: MTK

Senior career*
Years	Team	Apps	(Gls)
2002–2003	Bodajk	30	(0)
2003–2004	Tápiószecső		
2004–2009	Rákospalota	113	(2)
2008	Rákospalota II	1	(2)
2009	Siófok	17	(1)
2009	Siófok II	1	(1)
2009–2011	Diósgyőr	24	(2)
2011	Tampere United		
2018–2019	Tápiószecső	24	(1)
2019–2020	Rákosmente	28	(0)
2020–2021	Gázgyár	1	(0)
2021–2022	Ráckeve	16	(2)
2022	Gázgyár	17	(0)
2022	Maglód	15	(1)
Total		287	(12)
- * Club domestic league appearances and goals

Gábor Horváth (born 10 July 1983) is a Hungarian former professional footballer who played as a defender.

== Career ==
On 23 July 2009, Horváth joined Nemzeti Bajnokság I club Diósgyőr.

== Career statistics ==
Appearances and goals by club, season and competition
Club	Season	League			Magyar Kupa		Ligakupa		Other		Total	
Club	Season	Division	Apps	Goals	Apps	Goals	Apps	Goals	Apps	Goals	Apps	Goals
Bodajk	2002–03	Nemzeti Bajnokság III	30	0	3	0	—		—		33	0
Rákospalota	2003–04	Nemzeti Bajnokság II	11	0	—		—		1 (Note: Appearance in Nemzeti Bajnokság I promotion play-offs)	0	12	0
Rákospalota	2004–05	Nemzeti Bajnokság II	23	0	1	0	—		—		24	0
Rákospalota	2005–06	Nemzeti Bajnokság I	24	0	3	0	—		—		27	0
Rákospalota	2006–07	Nemzeti Bajnokság I	22	1	3	0	—		—		25	1
Rákospalota	2007–08	Nemzeti Bajnokság I	26	1	2	0	12	1	—		40	2
Rákospalota	2008–09	Nemzeti Bajnokság I	7	0	—		—		—		7	0
Rákospalota	Total		113	2	9	0	12	1	1	0	135	3
Rákospalota II	2008–09	Megyei Bajnokság I	1	2	—		—		—		1	2
Siófok	2008–09	Nemzeti Bajnokság I	17	1	4	0	5	0	—		26	1
Siófok II	2008–09	Nemzeti Bajnokság III	1	1	—		—		—		1	1
Diósgyőr	2009–10	Nemzeti Bajnokság I	10	1	1	0	4	0	—		15	1
Diósgyőr	2010–11	Nemzeti Bajnokság II	14	1	1	0	—		—		15	1
Diósgyőr	Total		24	2	2	0	4	0	—		30	2
Tápiószecső	2017–18	Megyei Bajnokság I	13	0	—		—		—		13	0
Tápiószecső	2018–19	Megyei Bajnokság I	11	1	—		—		1 (Note: Appearance in Magyar Kupa qualifying rounds)	0	12	1
Tápiószecső	Total		24	1	—		—		1	0	25	1
Rákosmente	2018–19	Nemzeti Bajnokság III	12	0	—		—		—		12	0
Rákosmente	2019–20	Nemzeti Bajnokság III	16	0	1	0	—		—		17	0
Rákosmente	Total		28	0	1	0	—		—		29	0
Gázgyár	2019–20	Megyei Bajnokság I	1	0	—		—		1 (Note: Appearance(s) in Budapest Kupa)	0	2	0
Ráckeve	2020–21	Megyei Bajnokság II	16	2	—		—		3 (Note: Two appearances in Pest Megyei Kupa, one appearance in Magyar Kupa qualifying rounds)	0	19	2
Gázgyár	2021–22	Megyei Bajnokság I	17	0	—		—		5	1	22	1
Maglód	2022–23	Megyei Bajnokság II	15	1	—		—		2 (Note: Appearances in Pest Megyei Kupa)	0	17	1
Career total			287	12	19	0	21	1	13	1	340	14

== Honours ==
Bodajk

- Nemzeti Bajnokság III – West: 2002–03

Tápiószecső

- Nemzeti Bajnokság III – Alföld: 2003–04

Diósgyőr

- Nemzeti Bajnokság II – East: 2010–11
