= Balázs Kovács (footballer) =

Hungarian footballer (born 1979)

Personal information
- Date of birth: 11 June 1979 (age 47)
- Place of birth: Budapest, Hungary
- Height: 1.78 m (5 ft 10 in)
- Position: Midfielder

Youth career
- –1998: Újpest

Senior career*
Years	Team	Apps	(Gls)
1998–2001	Újpest	38	(0)
2000–2001	→ Monor (loan)	22	(2)
2001–2003	Videoton	24	(0)
2003–2011	Rákospalota	154	(10)
2007–2008	Rákospalota II	3	(0)
Total		241	(12)
- * Club domestic league appearances and goals

Balázs Kovács (born 11 June 1979) is a Hungarian former professional footballer who played as a midfielder.

== Career ==
=== Újpest ===
On 20 March 1999, Kovács made his debut for Újpest in the Nemzeti Bajnokság I in a 1–1 draw against Diósgyőr.

=== Videoton ===
On 26 June 2001, István Szigli the sporting director of Nemzeti Bajnokság I club Videoton announced the signing of Kovács on a three-year contract.

=== Rákospalota ===
His first top tier goal came on 17 May 2008, in a 3–3 away draw against Zalaegerszeg for Rákospalota.

On 21 January 2010, he extended his contract with REAC until 2011.

== Career statistics ==
Appearances and goals by club, season and competition
Club	Season	League			Magyar Kupa		Ligakupa		Europe		Other		Total	
Club	Season	Division	Apps	Goals	Apps	Goals	Apps	Goals	Apps	Goals	Apps	Goals	Apps	Goals
Újpest	1998–99	Nemzeti Bajnokság I	14	0	—		—		—		—		14	0
Újpest	1999–2000	Nemzeti Bajnokság I	20	0	2	0	—		1 (Note: Appearance in UEFA Cup)	0	—		23	0
Újpest	2000–01	Nemzeti Bajnokság I	4	0	2	0	—		—		—		6	0
Újpest	Total		38	0	4	0	—		1	0	—		43	0
Monor (loan)	2000–01	Nemzeti Bajnokság II	22	2	—		—		—		—		22	2
Videoton	2001–02	Nemzeti Bajnokság I	23	0	4	0	—		—		—		27	0
Videoton	2002–03	Nemzeti Bajnokság I	1	0	—		—		—		—		1	0
Videoton	Total		24	0	4	0	—		—		—		28	0
Rákospalota	2003–04	Nemzeti Bajnokság II	21	0	—		—		—		2 (Note: Appearances in Nemzeti Bajnokság I promotion play-offs)	0	23	0
Rákospalota	2004–05	Nemzeti Bajnokság II	24	8	1	1	—		—		—		25	9
Rákospalota	2005–06	Nemzeti Bajnokság I	18	0	3	0	—		—		—		21	0
Rákospalota	2006–07	Nemzeti Bajnokság I	8	0	1	0	—		—		—		9	0
Rákospalota	2007–08	Nemzeti Bajnokság I	9	1	1	0	13	0	—		—		23	1
Rákospalota	2008–09	Nemzeti Bajnokság I	16	0	3	0	6	0	—		—		25	0
Rákospalota	2009–10	Nemzeti Bajnokság II	22	1	2	0	—		—		—		24	1
Rákospalota	2010–11	Nemzeti Bajnokság II	24	0	1	0	—		—		—		25	0
Rákospalota	2011–12	Nemzeti Bajnokság II	12	0	2	0	—		—		—		14	0
Rákospalota	Total		154	10	14	1	19	0	—		2	0	189	11
Rákospalota II	2007–08	Nemzeti Bajnokság III	3	0	—		—		—		—		3	0
Career total			241	12	22	1	19	0	1	0	2	0	285	13
