= Oliver Pusztai =

Hungarian football coach and former professional player

Olivér Pusztai
Personal information
- Date of birth: 14 October 1981 (age 45)
- Place of birth: Szombathely, Hungary
- Height: 1.85 m (6 ft 1 in)
- Position: Defender

Youth career
- 1988–1999: Szombathelyi Haladás VSE

Senior career*
Years	Team	Apps	(Gls)
1999–2001	Szombathelyi Haladás	9	(0)
2001–2002	Büki TK	22	(5)
2002–2003	BFC Siófok	14	(0)
2003–2004	MTK Budapest	18	(1)
2004–2006	Győri ETO FC	29	(0)
2006–2008	Rákospalotai EAC	28	(4)
2008–2010	SK Austria Kärnten	42	(4)
2010–2014	SK Austria Klagenfurt	80	(8)
2014–2019	ASV Klagenfurt	120	(24)
2019–2021	SV St.Jakob/Rosental	25	(0)

International career
2001–2003	Hungary U-21	16	(0)

Managerial career
- 2017–2022: Wolfsberg (academy coach)
- 2022–2023: SK Treibach (assistant coach)
- * Club domestic league appearances and goals

Oliver Pusztai (born 14 October 1981) is a Hungarian football coach (with an UEFA A Licence since 2021) and a former professional player.

== Club career ==
=== Hungary ===
Pusztai started his professional career at age 18 at his hometown club Szombathelyi Haladás in 1999. After a short break in the Hungarian 2nd division (NB2) with Büki TK and as a member of the Hungary national under-21 football team, he made a move in 2002 to BFC Siófok and played again in the highest league of Hungary (NB1). In 2003 Pusztai get a contract from the ruling champion MTK Budapest and goes in the Hungarian capital city. In the same year he played in the UEFA Champions League qualification against HJK Helsinki and Celtic Glasgow and later in UEFA Cup against Dinamo Zagreb.

In 2004 Pusztai moved to Győri ETO FC and played there 2 seasons. Than till 2008 he was player and an important member of a small-budget club, Rákospalotai EAC in Budapest and successfully escaped twice the relegation.

=== U-21 national team (Hungary) ===
He was coming player between 2001 and 2003 of the Hungarian U-21 team and played for the qualification to the UEFA European Under-21 Championship in Germany and to the 2004 Summer Olympics in Athens.

=== Austria ===
In 2008, after 100 NB1 games in Hungary, Pusztai went international and played 2 years in the Austrian Football Bundesliga at SK Austria Kärnten in Klagenfurt. From 2010 he played 4 seasons in the 3rd division (Regionalliga Mitte) in the same city at SK Austria Klagenfurt (2007).

Between 2014 and 2019 Pusztai was at a traditional club named ASV Klagenfurt. And played there the season 2015–2016, first time in club history - after the winning of Austrian Landesliga - in the Austrian Regional League again. In 2019 Pusztai went to SV St.Jakob/Rosental in the Austrian Landesliga and finished his career in October 2021 after his 22nd season.
