= Péter Tereánszki-Tóth =

Hungarian footballer (1980–2020)

Personal information
- Full name: Péter Tereánszki-Tóth
- Date of birth: 12 December 1980
- Place of birth: Székesfehérvár, Hungary
- Date of death: 15 September 2020 (aged 39)
- Height: 1.85 m (6 ft 1 in)
- Positions: Defender; right back

Senior career*
Years	Team	Apps	(Gls)
2000–2002	Bodajk SE		
2002–2005	Videoton FC	41	(2)
2005–2006	Kaposvári Rákóczi FC	14	(0)
2006–2007	BFC Siófok	9	(0)
2008–2009	Százhalombattai LK	10	(0)
2009–2010	SC Ostbahn XI	23	(1)
2010	USV Scheiblingkirchen-Warth		
2010–2011	Hamilton Croatia	15	(0)
2011–2012	USV Scheiblingkirchen-Warth		
2012–2014	USC Kirchschlag		
- * Club domestic league appearances and goals as of 26 July 2012

Péter Tereánszki-Tóth, later Péter Jakab (12 December 1980 – 15 September 2020), was a Hungarian football player who played in the Nemzeti Bajnokság I, Nemzeti Bajnokság II, Austrian Regionalliga East, and the Canadian Soccer League.

== Playing career ==
Tereánszki-Tóth began his career in 2002 with Videoton FC in the Nemzeti Bajnokság I. Throughout his tenure with Videoton he featured in the 2003 UEFA Intertoto Cup against FC Marek Dupnitsa. He later had stints with Kaposvári Rákóczi FC, and BFC Siófok in the Nemzeti Bajnokság II. In 2009, he played abroad in Austria with SC Ostbahn XI, and later with USV Scheiblingkirchen-Warth, and USC Kirchschlag.

In 2010, he played overseas in the Canadian Soccer League with Hamilton Croatia. During his stint with Hamilton he would feature in the CSL Championship match against Brantford Galaxy, but were defeated 3–0.

== Personal life ==
Tereánszki-Tóth later changed his name to Péter Jakab. On 4 September 2020, he requested a blood donation for a life-saving surgery. After receiving the necessary blood transfusion for his illness his conditions failed to improve and he died on 15 September 2020.
