= Zoltán Finta =

Hungarian footballer

Personal information
- Date of birth: 17 September 1979 (age 47)
- Place of birth: Kaposvár, Hungary
- Height: 1.85 m (6 ft 1 in)
- Position: Defender

Team information
- Current team: Pécsi Mecsek FC

Youth career
- Kaposvári Rákóczi FC
- Pécsi EAC

Senior career*
Years	Team	Apps	(Gls)
1998–2006	Kaposvári Rákóczi FC		
2000	Andocs	2	(0)
2001	Kaposvölgye	11	(1)
2001	Balatonlelle	5	(0)
2006–	Pécsi Mecsek FC	14	(1)
- * Club domestic league appearances and goals as of 12 May 2007

Zoltán Finta (born 17 September 1979) is a Hungarian football player who currently plays for Pécsi Mecsek FC.

He has played for Kaposvár and Pécsi Mecsek in the Nemzeti Bajnokság I.
