= Tamás Németh =

Hungarian footballer (born 1981)

Personal information
- Date of birth: 30 April 1981 (age 45)
- Place of birth: Budapest, Hungary
- Height: 1.69 m (5 ft 7 in)
- Position: Defender

Youth career
- BVSC
- Vasas

Senior career*
| Years | Team | Apps | (Gls) |
| 2000–2001 | Dabas | 17 | (1) |
| 2001–2005 | Újpest | 12 | (0) |
| 2004–2005 | → Rákospalota (loan) | 13 | (0) |
| 2005–2006 | Rákospalota | 14 | (0) |
| 2006–2008 | Soroksár | 37 | (1) |
| 2008–2009 | Budaörs | 21 | (0) |
| 2009–2011 | Újlengyel | 21 | (3) |
| 2013 | Rákosmenti TK II | 2 | (1) |
| Total | | 137 | (6) |

International career
| 2003 | Hungary U21 | 4 | (0) |
- * Club domestic league appearances and goals

Tamás Németh (born 30 April 1981) is a Hungarian former professional footballer, who played as a defender.

== Career statistics ==
=== Club ===
Appearances and goals by club, season and competition
| Club | Season | League | | | Magyar Kupa | | Ligakupa | | Other | | Total | |
| Club | Season | Division | Apps | Goals | Apps | Goals | Apps | Goals | Apps | Goals | Apps | Goals |
|---|---|---|---|---|---|---|---|---|---|---|---|---|
| Dabas | 2000–01 | Nemzeti Bajnokság III | 17 | 1 | — | | — | | — | | 17 | 1 |
| Újpest | 2002–03 | Nemzeti Bajnokság I | 7 | 0 | 1 | 0 | — | | 1 (Note: Appearance in Szuperkupa) | 0 | 9 | 0 |
| Újpest | 2003–04 | Nemzeti Bajnokság I | 5 | 0 | — | | — | | — | | 5 | 0 |
| Újpest | Total | | 12 | 0 | 1 | 0 | — | | 1 | 0 | 14 | 0 |
| Rákospalota (loan) | 2004–05 | Nemzeti Bajnokság II | 13 | 0 | — | | — | | — | | 13 | 0 |
| Rákospalota | 2005–06 | Nemzeti Bajnokság I | 14 | 0 | 4 | 0 | — | | — | | 18 | 0 |
| Soroksár | 2006–07 | Nemzeti Bajnokság II | 24 | 1 | 2 | 1 | — | | — | | 26 | 2 |
| Soroksár | 2007–08 | Nemzeti Bajnokság II | 13 | 0 | 1 | 0 | — | | — | | 14 | 0 |
| Soroksár | Total | | 37 | 1 | 3 | 1 | — | | — | | 40 | 2 |
| Budaörs | 2007–08 | Nemzeti Bajnokság II | 12 | 0 | — | | — | | — | | 12 | 0 |
| Budaörs | 2008–09 | Nemzeti Bajnokság II | 9 | 0 | — | | 1 | 0 | — | | 10 | 0 |
| Budaörs | Total | | 21 | 0 | — | | 1 | 0 | — | | 22 | 0 |
| Újlengyel | 2009–10 | Megyei Bajnokság I | 6 | 3 | — | | — | | 1 (Note: Appearance in Pest Megyei Kupa) | 0 | 7 | 3 |
| Újlengyel | 2010–11 | Megyei Bajnokság I | 15 | 0 | — | | — | | — | | 15 | 0 |
| Újlengyel | Total | | 21 | 3 | — | | — | | 1 | 0 | 22 | 3 |
| Rákosmenti TK II | 2012–13 | Megyei Bajnokság IV | 2 | 1 | — | | — | | — | | 2 | 1 |
| Career total | | | 137 | 6 | 8 | 1 | 1 | 0 | 2 | 0 | 148 | 7 |

=== International ===
Appearances and goals by national team and year
| Team | Year | Total | |
| Team | Year | Apps | Goals |
|---|---|---|---|
| Hungary U21 | 2003 | 4 | 0 |
| Career total | | 4 | 0 |

== Honours ==
Újpest

- Szuperkupa: 2002
