= Tamás Somorjai =

Hungarian footballer (b1980)

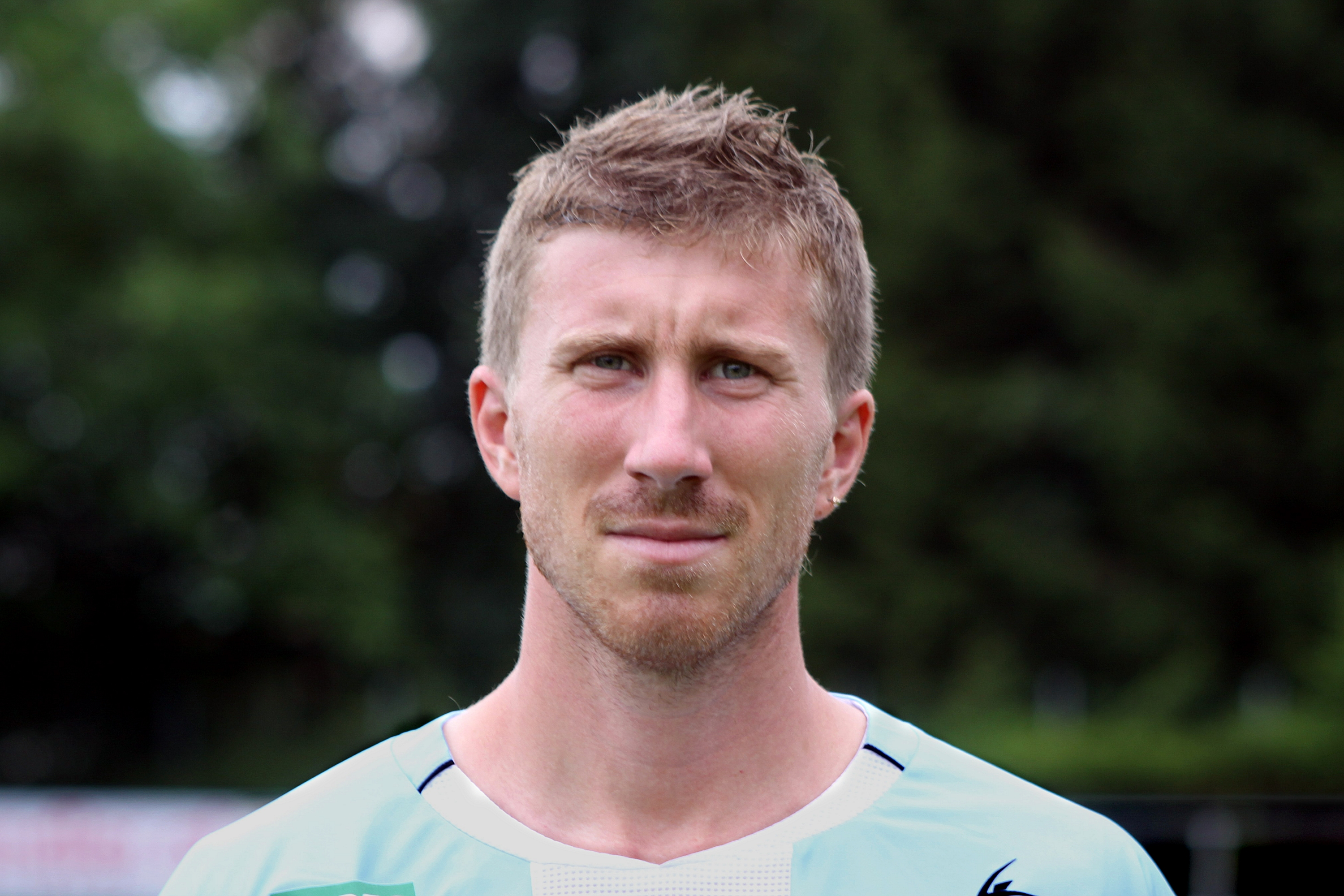
- 2009 by Steindy

Personal information
- Date of birth: 12 January 1980 (age 46)
- Place of birth: Budapest, Hungary
- Height: 1.80 m (5 ft 11 in)
- Position: Midfielder

Senior career*
Years	Team	Apps	(Gls)
1999–2005	Ferencvárosi TC	15	(1)
2001	→ FC Dabas (loan)	?	(?)
2001–2002	→ Celldömölki VSE (loan)	?	(?)
2005	→ FC Sopron (loan)	14	(1)
2005–2009	Rákospalotai EAC	67	(17)
2007–2009	→ Vasas SC (loan)	34	(2)
2009–2010	TSV Hartberg	2	(0)
2010	Diósgyőri VTK	7	(2)
2010–2012	Szigetszentmiklós	47	(8)
- * Club domestic league appearances and goals

Tamás Somorjai (born 12 January 1980) is a Hungarian former football player.
