= Zsolt Makra =

Hungarian footballer

Personal information
- Full name: Zsolt László Makra
- Date of birth: 24 May 1982 (age 44)
- Place of birth: Szeged, Hungary
- Height: 1.80 m (5 ft 11 in)
- Position: Defender

Team information
- Current team: Békéscsaba
- Number: 17

Youth career
- 1996–2000: Tisza Volán SC
- 2000–2001: Vasas SC

Senior career*
Years	Team	Apps	(Gls)
2001–2003	Vasas	22	(1)
2003–2004	Rákospalota	13	(0)
2004–2008	Győri ETO	42	(0)
2006–2007	→ Rákospalota (loan)	15	(1)
2007–2008	Primorje	7	(0)
2008–2009	Algyő SK	25	(2)
2009–2013	Békéscsaba	78	(2)
2013–2015	Orosháza	42	(0)

International career
2004–2005	Hungary U-21		
- * Club domestic league appearances and goals as of 20 August 2015

Zsolt Makra (born 24 May 1982 in Szeged) is a Hungarian football defender playing for Békéscsaba 1912 Előre SE.

He had previously played with Vasas SC, Rákospalotai EAC, Győri ETO FC and Slovenian club NK Primorje. In 2008, he signed with Algyő SK, and after one year he moved to Békéscsaba 1912 Előre SE.
