= Viktor Szentpéteri =

Hungarian footballer

Personal information
- Full name: Viktor Szentpéteri
- Date of birth: 1 November 1979 (age 47)
- Place of birth: Budapest, Hungary
- Height: 1.87 m (6 ft 1 1/2 in)
- Position: Goalkeeper

Team information
- Current team: Dorogi
- Number: 12

Youth career
- 1987–1990: Dunakeszi VSE
- 1990–1999: Újpest FC

Senior career*
Years	Team	Apps	(Gls)
1999–2003	REAC	4	(0)
2003–2004	BKV Előre	?	(?)
2004–2006	REAC	23	(0)
2006–2007	Dunaújváros	16	(0)
2008–2010	Lahti	39	(0)
2010	MTK Budapest	1	(0)
2010–2011	Sliema Wanderers	17	(0)
2011–2012	REAC	6	(0)
2012–2013	Lahti	25	(0)
2013	BKV Előre	7	(0)
2013	KuPS	1	(0)
2014–2016	Budaörsi	26	(0)
2016–2017	Vác FC	22	(0)
2017–2018	MTK Budapest	17	(0)
2018–2019	Mezőkövesdi		
2019	Dorogi	11	(0)

International career
1997	Hungary U-18	3	(0)
- * Club domestic league appearances and goals as of 21:52, 28 May 2019 (UTC)

Viktor Szentpéteri (born 1 November 1979 in Budapest) is a former Hungarian footballer who played as goalkeeper.

== Achievements ==
FC Lahti
Veikkausliiga: 3rd Position (2008)
Europa League : Third Qualifying Round (2009)
