= Balázs Farkas (footballer, born 1978) =

Hungarian footballer

Personal information
- Full name: Balázs Farkas
- Date of birth: 2 November 1978 (age 47)
- Place of birth: Budapest, Hungary
- Height: 1.84 m (6 ft 0 in)
- Position: Goalkeeper

Team information
- Current team: Diósgyőri VTK
- Number: 12

Senior career*
Years	Team	Apps	(Gls)
1999–2000	BVSC Budapest	19	(0)
2000–2003	FC Sopron	55	(0)
2003–2007	Rákospalotai EAC	54	(0)
2007–2008	Olympiacos Volos		
2008	Pécsi Mecsek FC	13	(0)
2008–2009	Felcsút FC	19	(0)
2009–2010	Szolnoki MÁV FC	24	(0)
2010–2011	Digenis Akritas Morphou		
2011–	Diósgyőri VTK	5	(0)
- * Club domestic league appearances and goals as of 11 March 2012

Balázs Farkas (born 2 November 1978 in Budapest) is a Hungarian football player who currently plays for Diósgyőri VTK.
