= Gábor Nagy (footballer, born 1981) =

Hungarian footballer

Personal information
- Date of birth: 30 September 1981 (age 45)
- Place of birth: Szombathely, Hungary
- Height: 1.85 m (6 ft 1 in)
- Position: Defender

Senior career*
Years	Team	Apps	(Gls)
1999–2002	Szombathely	51	(0)
2002–2003	Bük	25	(3)
2003–2005	Újpest	20	(0)
2005–2006	Rákospalota	29	(0)
2007–2008	Aarau	8	(0)
2008–2011	APEP	22	(3)
2011–2012	Szombathely	16	(1)
2012–2013	Gyirmót	28	(0)
2013–2014	Vasas	3	(0)

International career
2002–2003	Hungary U-21	7	(0)
- * Club domestic league appearances and goals

Gábor Nagy (born 30 September 1981) is a Hungarian former football player.

He signed for FC Aarau on 6 February 2007.
