= Attila Polonkai =

Hungarian footballer

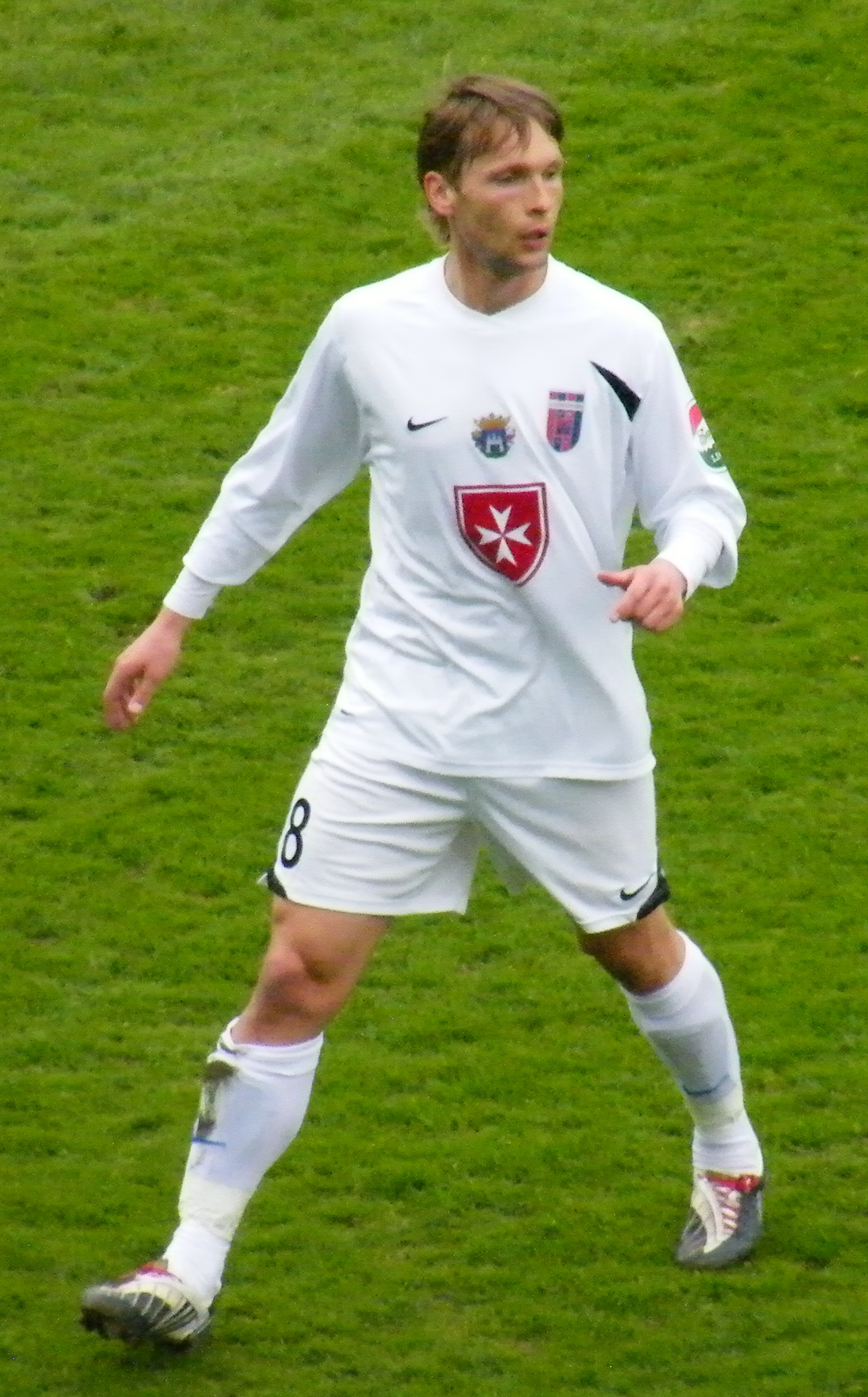

Personal information
- Full name: Attila Polonkai
- Date of birth: 12 June 1979 (age 47)
- Place of birth: Budapest, Hungary
- Height: 1.78 m (5 ft 10 in)
- Position: Midfielder

Senior career*
| Years | Team | Apps | (Gls) |
| 1996–2000 | BVSC | 58 | (5) |
| 1998 | → Szeged (loan) | | |
| 1999 | → Szolnok (loan) | 1 | (0) |
| 2000–2003 | Vasas | 28 | (4) |
| 2003 | Rákospalota | 15 | (1) |
| 2003–2005 | Újpest | 51 | (3) |
| 2005–2008 | Rákospalota | 60 | (9) |
| 2008–2012 | Videoton | 86 | (12) |
| 2012–2018 | Puskás | 95 | (2) |
| 2017–2018 | → Csákvári TK (loan) | 18 | (0) |

International career
| 1996–1997 | Hungary U-18 | 2 | (1) |
| 1999–2000 | Hungary U-21 | 3 | (0) |
| 2003–2006 | Hungary | 3 | (0) |
- * Club domestic league appearances and goals as of 11 April 2018

Attila Polonkai (born 12 June 1979) is a Hungarian football player.
