= Tamás Horváth (footballer, born 1983) =

Hungarian footballer

Personal information
- Date of birth: 4 March 1983 (age 43)
- Place of birth: Békéscsaba, Hungary
- Height: 1.82 m (5 ft 11 1/2 in)
- Position: Defender

Team information
- Current team: Békéscsaba
- Number: 22

Youth career
- 1997–2001: Békéscsaba
- 2001–2002: Újpest

Senior career*
Years	Team	Apps	(Gls)
2002–2003	Fót	25	(3)
2003–2004	Újpest	0	(0)
2004–2006	Rákospalota	24	(0)
2006–	Békéscsaba	122	(5)
- * Club domestic league appearances and goals as of 3 November 2013

Tamás Horváth (born 4 March 1983) is a Hungarian footballer who plays as a defender for Békéscsaba. He made seven appearances in Nemzeti Bajnokság I, the highest level of football in Hungary, for Rákospalota.
