= 2000–01 Nemzeti Bajnokság II =

Nemzeti Bajnokság II
- Season: 2000–01
- Champions: Szombathelyi Haladás; BKV Előre SC
- Promoted: (West); (East)
- Relegated: Bőcs (East), Csongrád (East), Kunszentmárton (East)

The 2000–01 Nemzeti Bajnokság II was the 103rd season of the Nemzeti Bajnokság II, the second tier of the Hungarian football league.

== League table ==
=== Western group ===
Pos	Team	Pld	W	D	L	GF	GA	GD	Pts	Promotion
1	Haladás	22	14	4	4	54	22	+32	46	Promotion to Nemzet Bajokság I
2	Százhalombattai FC	22	10	9	3	43	27	+16	39	
3	Pécsi Mecsek FC	22	10	6	6	33	25	+8	36	
4	Pápai ELC	22	10	5	7	28	29	−1	35	
5	Hévíz	22	8	8	6	33	25	+8	32	
6	Kaposvári Rákóczi FC	22	8	8	6	27	18	+9	32	
7	Celldömölki VSE	22	9	4	9	34	36	−2	31	
8	Siófok FC	22	8	6	8	29	34	−5	30	
9	Marcali	22	7	6	9	32	39	−7	27	
10	Rákospalotai EAC	22	6	4	12	23	43	−20	22	
11	Nagykanizsa FC	22	4	4	14	21	39	−18	16	
12	Dorogi FC	22	4	4	14	27	47	−20	16	

=== Eastern group ===
Pos	Team	Pld	W	D	L	GF	GA	GD	Pts	Relegation
1	BKV Előre SC	20	12	3	5	35	19	+16	39	
2	Kecskeméti FC	20	9	9	2	34	22	+12	36	
3	Nyírség-Spartacus FC	20	10	4	6	34	25	+9	34	
4	Szolnoki MÁV FC	20	8	5	7	36	25	+11	29	
5	BVSC	20	8	5	7	31	30	+1	29	
6	Fóti SE	20	7	7	6	30	28	+2	28	
7	Csepel-Auto Trader	20	8	4	8	22	28	−6	28	
8	Békéscsabai Előre FC	20	7	6	7	29	27	+2	27	
9	Monor-Ilzer SE	20	7	5	8	28	31	−3	26	
10	Bőcs KSC	20	4	5	11	15	31	−16	17	Relegation Nemzeti Bajnokság III
11	Csongrádi FC	20	1	5	14	16	44	−28	8	
–	Kunszentmártoni TE (Note: Withdrew)	0	-	-	-	-	-	—	0	

== See also ==
- 2000–01 Magyar Kupa
- 2000–01 Nemzeti Bajnokság I
- 2000–01 Nemzeti Bajnokság III
