= 2007–08 FC Tatabánya season =

Tatabánya
2007–08 season
- Manager: Ferenc Mészáros (until 19 August 2007); László Borbély (from 20 August 2007 to 10 December 2007); Octavio Zambrano (from 10 January 2008)
- Stadium: Városi Stadion (Home stadium); Szőnyi úti Stadion (Note: The matches were played at the Szőnyi úti Stadion in Budapest in the second half of the season behind closed doors, instead of Tatabánya regular stadium, the Városi Stadion in Tatabánya, which did not meet HFF requirements.); Illovszky Rudolf Stadion (Note: The match against Újpest was played at the Illovszky Rudolf Stadion in Budapest, instead of Tatabánya regular stadium, the Városi Stadion in Tatabánya, which did not meet HFF requirements.) (Temporary stadiums)
- Nemzeti Bajnokság I: 15th (relegated)
- Magyar Kupa: Round of 32
- Ligakupa: Autumn season: Quarter-finals; Spring season: Group stage
- Highest home attendance: 4,000 v Újpest (12 April 2008, Nemzeti Bajnokság I)
- Lowest home attendance: 150 v Rákospalota (15 March 2008, Nemzeti Bajnokság I)
- Average home league attendance: 810
- Biggest win: 8–1 v Sopron (Home, 9 October 2007, Ligakupa)
- Biggest defeat: 0–7 v Fehérvár (Away, 25 August 2007, Nemzeti Bajnokság I); 0–7 v Zalaegerszeg (Away, 8 December 2007, Ligakupa)

The 2007–08 season was Football Club Tatabánya's 45th competitive season, 3rd consecutive season in the Nemzeti Bajnokság I and 95th season in existence as a football club. In addition to the domestic league, Tatabánya participated in that season's editions of the Magyar Kupa and the Ligakupa.

== Squad ==
Squad at end of season

Note: Flags indicate national team as defined under FIFA eligibility rules; some limited exceptions apply. Players may hold more than one non-FIFA nationality.

No.	Pos.	Nation	Player
1	GK	HUN	Roland Herbert
2	MF	HUN	László Almási
3	MF	HUN	Zoltán Balogh
4	MF	HUN	Zsolt Lázár
5	MF	MEX	Jesús Flores
7	FW	HUN	Attila Batics
8	DF	HUN	György Radnai
9	FW	HUN	Tamás Ferenc Béres
10	FW	MEX	Kichi
11	FW	HUN	Bence Tarcsa
13	DF	HUN	Csaba Vámosi
14	DF	HUN	Balázs Balogh

No.	Pos.	Nation	Player
15	MF	HUN	István Kovács
16	FW	HUN	Gábor Szilágyi
17	MF	HUN	Gábor Ferenczi
18	FW	HUN	Norbert Bazsika
21	DF	HUN	András Dienes
25	MF	HUN	Attila Németh
28	FW	HUN	Barna Papucsek
31	GK	HUN	Péter Kurucz
66	DF	HUN	Viktor Farkas
79	MF	HUN	László Megyesi
84	MF	HUN	Dániel Asztalos
88	FW	HUN	Richárd Nagy

== Competitions ==
=== Overview ===
Competition	First match	Last match	Starting round	Final position	Record							
Competition	First match	Last match	Starting round	Final position	Pld	W	D	L	GF	GA	GD	Win %
Nemzeti Bajnokság I	20 July 2007	1 June 2008	Matchday 1	15th	30	2	4	24	34	93	−59	6.67
Magyar Kupa	29 August 2007	26 September 2007	Third round	Round of 32	2	1	1	0	5	4	+1	50.00
Ligakupa (Autumn season)	15 August 2007	26 October 2007	Group stage	Quarter-finals	8	3	1	4	15	14	+1	37.50
Ligakupa (Spring season)	1 December 2007	27 February 2008	Group stage	Group stage	6	1	0	5	7	19	−12	16.67
Total					46	7	6	33	61	130	−69	15.22

Source: Competitions

=== Nemzeti Bajnokság I ===
==== League table ====
Pos	Team	Pld	W	D	L	GF	GA	GD	Pts	Qualification or relegation
12	Rákospalota	30	7	9	14	42	60	−18	30	
13	Diósgyőr	30	5	13	12	43	63	−20	28	
14	Siófok	30	6	9	15	33	46	−13	27	
15	Tatabánya (R)	30	2	4	24	34	93	−59	10	Relegation to Nemzeti Bajnokság II
16	Sopron (Note: FC Sopron couldn't finish the 2007–08 season, because of bankruptcy. All remaining matches will be counted as won for their opponents.) (D)	30	2	5	23	10	73	−63	0	Exclution and Dissolution

Source: soccerway.com
(D) Disqualified; (R) Relegated

==== Results summary ====
Overall								Home						Away					
Pld	W	D	L	GF	GA	GD	Pts	W	D	L	GF	GA	GD	W	D	L	GF	GA	GD
30	2	4	24	34	93	−59	10	1	3	11	19	38	−19	1	1	13	15	55	−40

Source: Hungarian Football Federation

==== Matches ====
20 July 2007 1	Vasas	3–1	Tatabánya	Budapest
19:00 CEST (UTC+2)	N. Németh 4'; Kenesei 12'; Balog (yellow card) 42'; A. Tóth (yellow card) 68'; Odrobéna 78'	Report	Poleksić (yellow card) 10'; Kriston 14', (yellow card) 46'; Dienes (yellow card) 40'; Megyesi (yellow card) 47'	Stadium: Illovszky Rudolf Stadion; Attendance: 2,500; Referee: Sándor Andó-Szabó; Assistant referees: Tibor Vígh, Zoltán Szalai; Fourth official: József Erdős

28 July 2007 2	Tatabánya	0–1	Nyíregyháza	Tatabánya
18:00 CEST (UTC+2)	Z. Balogh (yellow card) 69'	Report	Montvai 32', (yellow card) 66'; Bagoly (yellow card) 51'	Stadium: Városi Stadion; Attendance: 1,500; Referee: Roland Veizer; Assistant referees: Zoltán Tompos, Péter Berettyán; Fourth official: Gergő Király

4 August 2007 3	Győr	2–1	Tatabánya	Győr
18:00 CEST (UTC+2)	Bogdanović 6', (yellow card) 77'; V. Farkas 15' (o.g.); Z. Kovács II (yellow card) 56'; Nikolov (yellow card) 63'; Bank (yellow card) 76'	Report	Ughy (yellow card) 58'; Filó 74'	Stadium: ETO Park; Attendance: 3,600; Referee: Gergely Sulyok; Assistant referees: György Ring, Vencel Tóth II; Fourth official: Péter Herbály

11 August 2007 4	Rákospalota	3–2	Tatabánya	Budapest
17:00 CEST (UTC+2)	Nyerges 9', 62'; Torma 13'; G. Horváth I (yellow card) 45'; Erős (yellow card) 53'; T. Nagy (yellow card) 66'	Report	Filó 60'; Nógrád 89'; Dienes (red card) 90'; Ughy (yellow card) 90+3'	Stadium: Budai II. László Stadion; Attendance: 700; Referee: Ferenc Bede; Assistant referees: Zsolt Márton, Zsolt Butkai; Fourth official: Gergely Szőts

18 August 2007 5	Tatabánya	0–1	Sopron	Tatabánya
17:30 CEST (UTC+2)	Kriston (yellow card) 45'; Ferenczi (yellow card) 81'; Hajdú (yellow card) 89'	Report	Sifter (yellow card) 39'; Tchana 64'; Belić (yellow card) 68'; Ködöböcz (yellow card) 85'	Stadium: Városi Stadion; Attendance: 1,000; Referee: Csaba Imre Sápi; Assistant referees: Zoltán Pápai, Gyula Ortó; Fourth official: János Guta

25 August 2007 6	Fehérvár	7–0	Tatabánya	Székesfehérvár
19:00 CEST (UTC+2)	Koller (yellow card) 26'; Dajić 39', 70', (yellow card) 70'; Vayer 60'; B. Farkas 63'; Simek 64'; Božić (yellow card) 70'; G. Horváth II (yellow card) 83'; Dvéri 87'; Sitku 89'	Report	Kichi (red card) 38'; Poleksić (yellow card) 70'	Stadium: Sóstói Stadion; Attendance: 1,596; Referee: Roland Veizer; Assistant referees: Szabolcs Deutsch, Zoltán Kis; Fourth official: Tibor Gyarmati II

1 September 2007 7	Tatabánya	2–4	Paks	Tatabánya
16:30 CEST (UTC+2)	Filó 17', (yellow card) 74'; Kozák (yellow card) 60'; B. Balogh (yellow card) 69'; Hajdú 82'	Report	Heffler (yellow card) 25', (goal) 36', 69'; Buzás (yellow card) 45'; Z. Molnár 56'; Tamási (yellow card) 58'; F. Horváth 74'	Stadium: Városi Stadion; Attendance: 1,200; Referee: Tamás Bognár; Assistant referees: Dr. Péter Szabó, Tamás Raff; Fourth official: Krisztián Pánczél

15 September 2007 8	Újpest	3–0	Tatabánya	Budapest
15:00 CEST (UTC+2)	Tisza 3'; Korcsmár (yellow card) 24'; Sadjo (yellow card) 36'; Z. Kovács I 40'; Dourandi 83'	Report	Filó (yellow card) 16'; A. Németh (yellow card) 65'	Stadium: Szusza Ferenc Stadion; Attendance: 3,100; Referee: Krisztián Pánczél; Assistant referees: László Viszokai, Gyula Fehér; Fourth official: J. Zoltán Kovács

21 September 2007 9	Tatabánya	2–2	Diósgyőr	Tatabánya
16:00 CEST (UTC+2)	Z. Balogh (yellow card) 53'; M. Takács 75'; Hajdú 80'; Filó (yellow card) 87'; Kichi (yellow card) 90+1'	Report	Simon 5'; Abdou 40'; Navarrete (yellow card) 67'; N. Farkas (yellow card) 87'; Hegedűs (yellow card) 88'	Stadium: Városi Stadion; Attendance: 400; Referee: Péter Solymosi; Assistant referees: Gábor Takács, Imre Attila Nagy; Fourth official: Imre Schnellbach

29 September 2007 10	Debrecen	4–1	Tatabánya	Debrecen
18:00 CEST (UTC+2)	Kerekes 2'; Dzsudzsák 7'; T. Sándor 33'; Stojkov 52'	Report	M. Takács 61'	Stadium: Oláh Gábor utcai Stadion; Attendance: 5,500; Referee: Sándor Andó-Szabó; Assistant referees: György Ring, Zsolt Butkai; Fourth official: Gábor Bendik

6 October 2007 11	Tatabánya	2–2	Siófok	Tatabánya
15:00 CEST (UTC+2)	Filó (yellow card) 7'; Hajdú 12'; I. Sándor 60'; Kichi (yellow card) 62'	Report	Fomumbod (yellow card) 7'; Lakić 47'; Fülöp (yellow card) 73', (goal) 84'	Stadium: Városi Stadion; Attendance: 500; Referee: Tamás Bognár; Assistant referees: Balázs Huszár, Dr. Péter Szabó; Fourth official: Csaba Pintér

20 October 2007 12	Zalaegerszeg	4–1	Tatabánya	Zalaegerszeg
18:00 CEST (UTC+2)	Pekič 18'; Méyé 20' (pen.); Koplárovics 28'; Miljatovič 53', (yellow card) 89'; N. Tóth (yellow card) 90'	Report	Hajdú 13'	Stadium: ZTE Arena; Attendance: 3,500; Referee: Zsolt Szabó; Assistant referees: Róbert Kispál, Tibor Vámos; Fourth official: Tibor Farkas

3 November 2007 13	Tatabánya	1–3	MTK	Tatabánya
13:30 CET (UTC+1)	Caugherty 64'; B. Balogh (yellow card) 66'	Report	Pátkai 10'; Á. Pintér 80'; Urbán 82'	Stadium: Városi Stadion; Attendance: 1,000; Referee: Szabolcs Szilasi; Assistant referees: Tibor Vígh, János Agócs; Fourth official: Gergő Janitz

10 November 2007 14	Kaposvár	4–2	Tatabánya	Kaposvár
16:00 CET (UTC+1)	Grúz 11'; Zahorecz (yellow card) 18'; Alves 29', 48'; Vasiljević (yellow card) 37'; Leandro 74'	Report	Megyesi 19'; Caugherty (yellow card) 29'; M. Takács 35'; Filó (yellow card) 49'; Béres (yellow card) 75'	Stadium: Rákóczi Stadion; Attendance: 2,000; Referee: Krisztián Pánczél; Assistant referees: Dr. Péter Kovács, Imre Attila Nagy; Fourth official: Csaba Ursprung

24 November 2007 15	Tatabánya	4–3	Honvéd	Tatabánya
13:00 CET (UTC+1)	Béres 4'; Pastva (yellow card) 31', (goal) 68'; Weisz 67', 78'; I. Sándor (yellow card) 90+3'	Report	Bárányos 14', (yellow card) 27'; Guié 36'; Hercegfalvi 52'; Angoua (red card) 81'	Stadium: Városi Stadion; Attendance: 1,500; Referee: Roland Veizer; Assistant referees: Róbert Kispál, György Ring; Fourth official: Péter Pető

23 February 2008 16	Tatabánya	0–2	Vasas	Budapest
16:00 CET (UTC+1)	Kichi (red card) 24'; Dienes (yellow card) 71'; Megyesi (yellow card) 81'	Report	N. Németh 10'; Pavičević (yellow card) 39'; Divić (yellow card) 65'; Lázok 70'	Stadium: Szőnyi úti Stadion; Attendance: 600; Referee: Szabolcs Szilasi; Assistant referees: Gábor Takács, Oszkár Lémon; Fourth official: J. Zoltán Kovács
Note: The Budapest Metropolitan Police reviewed its earlier decision and allowed 600 spectators to attend the match.

1 March 2008 17	Nyíregyháza	5–0	Tatabánya	Nyíregyháza
14:00 CET (UTC+1)	Welton (yellow card) 34'; Granát 49'; N. Szilágyi 57'; Bagoly 73'; Lippai 77'; Dosso 83'	Report	Lázár (yellow card) 65'; Vámosi (yellow card) 76'	Stadium: Városi Stadion; Attendance: 0 Referee: Ádám Németh; Assistant referees: Balázs Farkas, Zoltán Szalai; Fourth official: István Kelemen

8 March 2008 18	Tatabánya	1–3	Győr	Budapest
16:00 CET (UTC+1)	Béres 73'	Report	Brnović 21'; Böőr 56', 61'	Stadium: Szőnyi úti Stadion; Attendance: 300; Referee: Krisztián Király; Assistant referees: Balázs Huszár, Zoltán Kovács; Fourth official: Tamás Bognár
Note: The club admitted up to 600 spectators to the match at their own risk.

15 March 2008 19	Tatabánya	1–1	Rákospalota	Budapest
16:00 CET (UTC+1)	G. Szilágyi (red card) 6'; Megyesi (yellow card) 22'; Vámosi (yellow card) 35'; Béres 58', (yellow card) 58'; Dienes (yellow card) 76'; Flores (yellow card) 78'; V. Farkas (yellow card) 84'	Report	Z. Varga II 63'; Torma (yellow card) 65'; Kőhalmi (yellow card) 83'	Stadium: Szőnyi úti Stadion; Attendance: 150; Referee: Gergely Sulyok; Assistant referees: Zoltán Kis, Attila Beidek; Fourth official: Gábor Oláh

22 March 2008 20	Sopron	0–3 (awd.)	Tatabánya	Sopron
		Report		Stadium: Káposztás utcai Stadion
Note: After the exclusion of Sopron, the matches were registered with a goal difference of 3–0.

30 March 2008 21	Tatabánya	1–3	Fehérvár	Budapest
16:00 CEST (UTC+2)	Almási (yellow card) 60'; Béres 73'; Kichi (yellow card) 75'	Report	Koller 26'; Polonkai 44'; Dajić 53'; B. Farkas (yellow card) 72'	Stadium: Szőnyi úti Stadion; Attendance: 0 Referee: Péter Solymosi; Assistant referees: Tibor Vígh, János Agócs; Fourth official: Ferenc Szöllősi

5 April 2008 22	Paks	6–0	Tatabánya	Paks
19:00 CEST (UTC+2)	T. Kiss I 12'; Éger 22'; Tököli 40', 61', 63'; Kriston 56'	Report	A. Németh (yellow card) 27'; V. Farkas (yellow card) 35'; Z. Balogh (red card) 43'; Vámosi (yellow card) 66'; Dienes (yellow card) 90'	Stadium: Fehérvári úti Stadion; Attendance: 1,300; Referee: József Berger; Assistant referees: Attila Forgács, Gábor Kormányos II; Fourth official: Gábor Fajkusz

12 April 2008 23	Tatabánya	2–3	Újpest	Budapest
19:00 CEST (UTC+2)	V. Farkas (yellow card) 39'; Vámosi 58', (yellow card) 68'; I. Kovács (yellow card) 71'; Megyesi 84'	Report	Tisza 22', 73'; Habi (yellow card) 45'; Korcsmár 60'; Hajdú (yellow card) 68'	Stadium: Illovszky Rudolf Stadion; Attendance: 4,000; Referee: István Vad; Assistant referees: Gyula Ortó, János Demeter; Fourth official: Róbert Nagy

19 April 2008 24	Diósgyőr	2–2	Tatabánya	Miskolc
19:00 CEST (UTC+2)	Simon 68', 70'	Report	I. Kovács (yellow card) 32'; Kichi 42'; Megyesi 45'; Kurucz (yellow card) 68'; Dienes (yellow card) 71'; V. Farkas (yellow card) 85'	Stadium: Diósgyőri Stadion; Attendance: 3,000; Referee: Ádám Németh; Assistant referees: Tibor Vígh, János Agócs; Fourth official: István Kelemen

26 April 2008 25	Tatabánya	1–2	Debrecen	Budapest
19:00 CEST (UTC+2)	Vámosi 84'	Report	Z. Takács 23', (yellow card) 67'; Kerekes 44', (yellow card) 85'	Stadium: Szőnyi úti Stadion; Attendance: 0 Referee: Tamás Bognár; Assistant referees: Dr. Péter Szabó, Balázs Huszár; Fourth official: Tibor Farkas

3 May 2008 26	Siófok	3–0	Tatabánya	Siófok
19:00 CEST (UTC+2)	Bonifert 29'; Magasföldi 34', 78'	Report	Megyesi (yellow card) 59'; Vámosi (yellow card) 77'	Stadium: Révész Géza utcai Stadion; Attendance: 500; Referee: Roland Veizer; Assistant referees: Attila Kelemen, Lajos L. Tóth; Fourth official: János Guta

10 May 2008 27	Tatabánya	0–2	Zalaegerszeg	Budapest
19:00 CEST (UTC+2)		Report	Waltner 3'; Miljatovič 28'; Vulin (yellow card) 72'; Z. Tóth (yellow card) 84'	Stadium: Szőnyi úti Stadion; Attendance: 0 Referee: Sándor Andó-Szabó

17 May 2008 28	MTK	5–1	Tatabánya	Budapest
19:00 CEST (UTC+2)	Pollák 9'; Á. Pintér 42'; Kanta 48', 81'; Urbán 83'	Report	Lázár 25'; I. Kovács (yellow card) 41'; Vámosi (yellow card) 47'; Kichi (yellow card) 62'; Dombai (yellow card) 83'	Stadium: Hidegkuti Nándor Stadion; Attendance: 2,000; Referee: Zoltán Iványi; Assistant referees: Zsolt Szpisják, István Albert; Fourth official: József Erdős

25 May 2008 29	Tatabánya	2–6	Kaposvár	Budapest
18:00 CEST (UTC+2)	Vámosi (yellow card) 57'; A. Németh 69'; Almási (yellow card) 81'; Ferenczi 85'	Report	Alves 15'; Zahorecz (yellow card) 37'; Oláh 38', 46', 83'; Maróti (yellow card) 47'; Da Silva 56'; Nikolić 90+1'	Stadium: Szőnyi úti Stadion; Attendance: 0 Referee: Krisztián Pánczél; Assistant referees: László Viszokai, Attila Kelemen; Fourth official: László Varga

1 June 2008 30	Honvéd	4–1	Tatabánya	Budapest
19:00 CEST (UTC+2)	Vincze (yellow card) 26'; Guié 28', 77'; Smiljanić (yellow card) 47'; Bárányos 73', 90+1'	Report	I. Kovács 59'	Stadium: Bozsik József Stadion; Attendance: 500; Referee: Krisztián Király; Assistant referees: Zoltán Kovács, Balázs Huszár; Fourth official: Csaba Pintér

=== Magyar Kupa ===
29 August 2007 Third round	Mosonmagyaróvár	2–3	Tatabánya	Mosonmagyaróvár
16:30 CEST (UTC+2)	Szalai 21'; Burián (yellow card) 42'; Bene 70'	Report	Hajdú 15', (red card) 42'; Kriston (yellow card) 20'; P. Horváth 50'; A. Németh 67', (red card) 85'	Stadium: Wittmann Antal park Attendance: 300; Referee: Krisztián Király; Assistant referees: Balázs Huszár, Zoltán Kovács

26 September 2007 Round of 32	Gyirmót	2–2	Tatabánya	Győr
18:00 CEST (UTC+2)	Z. Szabó 26'; Oross 73', (yellow card) 85'	Report	M. Takács 19'; I. Sándor (yellow card) 60'; Filó (yellow card) 61'; Kichi 72'; Kriston (red card) 83'; Caugherty (red card) 90'	Stadium: Ménfői úti Stadion; Attendance: 550; Referee: Gábor Oláh; Assistant referees: Zoltán Szalai, Ferenc Varga
Note: Gyirmót progressed as a lower division team.

=== Ligakupa ===
==== Autumn season ====
===== Group stage =====
Pos	Team	Pld	W	D	L	GF	GA	GD	Pts	Qualification	GYO	TAT	MTK	SOP
1	Győr	6	4	0	2	13	8	+5	12	Advance to knockout phase	—	3–0	1–0	1–2
2	Tatabánya	6	3	1	2	13	9	+4	10	Advance to knockout phase	3–1	—	0–0	8–1
3	MTK Budapest	6	2	1	3	8	9	−1	7		2–3	4–1	—	2–1
4	Sopron	6	2	0	4	8	16	−8	6		1–4	0–1	3–0	—

Source: HFF

15 August 2007 1	Tatabánya	0–0	MTK	Tatabánya
17:30 CEST (UTC+2)	Filó (yellow card) 29'	Report	Á. Szabó (yellow card) 28'; Bajúsz (red card) 88'	Stadium: Városi Stadion; Attendance: 400; Referee: Szabolcs Szilasi; Assistant referees: Imre Attila Nagy, Roland Schuszter

22 August 2007 2	Sopron	0–1	Tatabánya	Sopron
16:00 CEST (UTC+2)		Report	Ferenczi 39'	Stadium: Káposztás utcai Stadion; Attendance: 700; Referee: Tamás Arany; Assistant referees: István Tóth, Zoltán Kovács

9 September 2007 3	Tatabánya	3–1	Győr	Tatabánya
16:30 CEST (UTC+2)	Weisz 61'; Filó 67'; Hajdú 81'	Report	Tokody 73'	Stadium: Városi Stadion; Attendance: 400; Referee: Péter Solymosi; Assistant referees: Zsolt Márton, Oszkár Lémon

19 September 2007 4	Győr	3–0	Tatabánya	Győr
16:00 CEST (UTC+2)	R. Varga 53'; Nyári (yellow card) 54'; Domanyik (yellow card) 67'; Müller (yellow card) 71'; Granát 72', 86'	Report		Stadium: ETO Park; Attendance: 100; Referee: Gábor Oláh; Assistant referees: Zsolt Butkai, Balázs Farkas

3 October 2007 5	MTK	4–1	Tatabánya	Budapest
16:00 CEST (UTC+2)	M. Tóth 57'; Kecskés 60'; Simon 61'; Ladóczki 64' (pen.)	Report	Kozák 72'	Stadium: Hidegkuti Nándor Stadion; Attendance: 200; Referee: Róbert Nagy; Assistant referees: Tibor Vígh, Tamás Márkus

9 October 2007 6	Tatabánya	8–1	Sopron	Tatabánya
15:00 CEST (UTC+2)	Hajdú 8'; Megyesi 26'; Kriston 28', 55'; P. Horváth 34'; Farkas 48'; Sándor 63'; Pastva (yellow card) 80'; Batics 89'	Report	Giura 12'	Stadium: Városi Stadion; Attendance: 200; Referee: Tamás Arany; Assistant referees: László Viszokai, Zoltán Szalai

===== Knockout phase =====
====== Quarter-finals ======
16 October 2007 First leg	Tatabánya	1–2	Diósgyőr	Tatabánya
14:30 CEST (UTC+2)	B. Balogh (yellow card) 26'; Megyesi 89'; Kriston (yellow card) 90+1'	Report	Simon 9', 48'; Kállai (yellow card) 30'; Bessong (yellow card) 89'	Stadium: Városi Stadion; Attendance: 200; Referee: István Mészáros; Assistant referees: Dr. Péter Kovács, Imre Attila Nagy

26 October 2007 Second leg	Diósgyőr	3–1 (5–2 agg.)	Tatabánya	Miskolc
18:00 CEST (UTC+2)	Simon 21'; Guyazou (yellow card) 44'; Farkas 82'; Lipusz 89'	Report	A. Németh (yellow card) 41'; Kichi (yellow card) 79'; M. Takács 84'	Stadium: Diósgyőri Stadion; Attendance: 1,500; Referee: Gyöngyi Gaál; Assistant referees: Gyula Fehér, Zsolt Butkai
Note: Diósgyőr won 5–2 on aggregate.

==== Spring season ====
===== Group stage =====
Pos	Team	Pld	W	D	L	GF	GA	GD	Pts	Qualification	ZAL	GYO	TAT	SOP
1	Zalaegerszeg	6	4	2	0	19	3	+16	14	Advance to knockout phase	—	1–1	7–0	5–0
2	Győr	6	4	2	0	16	6	+10	14	Advance to knockout phase	1–1	—	3–2	4–1
3	Tatabánya	6	1	0	5	7	19	−12	3		1–2	1–4	—	3–0 (Note: Sopron couldn't finish the 2007–08 season due to bankruptcy. All remaining matches were counted as won for their opponents.)
4	Sopron	6	1	0	5	4	18	−14	3	Exclution	0–3	0–3	3–0	—

Source: HFF
Notes:

1 December 2007 1	Sopron	3–0	Tatabánya	Sopron
13:00 CET (UTC+1)	Belić 34', 55'; Dancs (yellow card) 37'; Sifter 44', (yellow card) 81'	Report	Béres (yellow card) 37'; A. Németh (yellow card) 58'	Stadium: Káposztás utcai Stadion; Attendance: 200; Referee: Krisztián Király; Assistant referees: Balázs Huszár, Zoltán Kovács

5 December 2007 2	Tatabánya	1–4	Győr	Tatabánya
13:00 CET (UTC+1)	M. Takács 26'	Report	Csermelyi 9'; Koltai 33', 88'; Dudás (yellow card) 44'; Brnović 56'	Stadium: Városi Stadion; Attendance: 300; Referee: János Takács; Assistant referees: Tamás Márkus, Zoltán Pápai

8 December 2007 3	Zalaegerszeg	7–0	Tatabánya	Zalaegerszeg
13:00 CET (UTC+1)	Méyé 9', 46'; Z. Tóth (yellow card) 17'; Botiș (yellow card) 19', (goal) 88'; Koplárovics 32', 38'; Balázs 55'; Lukács 71'; Simonfalvi (yellow card) 77'	Report	Kriston (yellow card) 22'; Béres (yellow card) 55'	Stadium: ZTE Arena; Attendance: 800; Referee: Ádám Németh; Assistant referees: Zsolt Márton, Zoltán Szalai

16 February 2008 4	Tatabánya	1–2	Zalaegerszeg	Tatabánya
14:00 CET (UTC+1)	Vulin 11' (o.g.); Almási (yellow card) 15'; Balogh (yellow card) 44'; Vámosi (yellow card) 45'; Kichi (yellow card) 72'; Flores (yellow card) 79'; Béres (yellow card) 82'	Report	Zatara (yellow card) 20'; Botiș (yellow card) 50'; Koplárovics 59'; Méyé 90'	Stadium: Stadion Városi; Attendance: 300; Referee: Tamás Bognár; Assistant referees: Dr. Péter Szabó, Balázs Huszár

20 February 2008 5	Tatabánya	3–0 (awd.)	Sopron	Tatabánya
		Report		Stadium: Városi Stadion

27 February 2008 6	Győr	3–2	Tatabánya	Győr
14:00 CET (UTC+1)	Csermelyi 29'; Lappints 56', 87'; Fomumbod (yellow card) 68'	Report	Almási (yellow card) 59'; Megyesi 73', 76'; I. Kovács (yellow card) 77'	Stadium: ETO Park; Attendance: 200; Referee: Gergely Sulyok; Assistant referees: Róbert Kispál, György Ring
