= 2006–07 FC Tatabánya season =

Tatabánya
2006–07 season
- Manager: Tibor Sisa (until 18 March 2007); Barnabás Tornyi (interim, from 19 March 2007)
- Stadium: Városi Stadion
- Nemzeti Bajnokság I: 12th
- Magyar Kupa: Round of 32
- Top goalscorer: League: Dorge Kouemaha (13); All: Dorge Kouemaha (13)
- Highest home attendance: 3,000 (multiple Nemzeti Bajnokság I matches)
- Lowest home attendance: 1,200 (multiple Nemzeti Bajnokság I matches)
- Average home league attendance: 2,047
- Biggest win: 4–0 v Pécs (Home, 10 December 2006, Nemzeti Bajnokság I)
- Biggest defeat: 0–4 v Kaposvár (Away, 10 March 2007, Nemzeti Bajnokság I); 0–4 v MTK (Away, 21 April 2007, Nemzeti Bajnokság I)

The 2006–07 season was Football Club Tatabánya's 44th competitive season, 2nd consecutive season in the Nemzeti Bajnokság I and 94th season in existence as a football club. In addition to the domestic league, Tatabánya participated in that season's editions of the Magyar Kupa.

== Squad ==
Squad at end of season

Note: Flags indicate national team as defined under FIFA eligibility rules; some limited exceptions apply. Players may hold more than one non-FIFA nationality.

No.	Pos.	Nation	Player
1	GK	(Slovakia) SVK	Marián Postrk
2	DF	(Hungary) HUN	Norbert Kerényi
3	FW	(Slovakia) SVK	Miroslav Kozák
5	MF	(Hungary) HUN	Norbert Hajdú
6	DF	(Hungary) HUN	Tamás Filó
7	MF	(Hungary) HUN	Tamás Romhányi
8	MF	(Hungary) HUN	Viktor Simon
9	DF	(Czech Republic) CZE	Jan Nečas
10	FW	(Cameroon) CMR	Dorge Kouemaha
11	MF	(Hungary) HUN	Attila Hullám
13	DF	(Hungary) HUN	Csaba Vámosi
14	DF	(Hungary) HUN	Attila Rajnay

No.	Pos.	Nation	Player
16	FW	(Hungary) HUN	Gábor Szilágyi
20	MF	(Hungary) HUN	Dániel Asztalos
21	MF	(Hungary) HUN	Péter Ábel
22	FW	(Hungary) HUN	Viktor Dombai
32	DF	(Montenegro) MNE	Vojislav Bakrač
33	MF	(Hungary) HUN	Zoltán Balogh
79	MF	(Hungary) HUN	László Megyesi
82	GK	(Montenegro) MNE	Vukašin Poleksić
84	FW	(Hungary) HUN	József Balázs
87	FW	(Hungary) HUN	János Szőke
88	MF	(Hungary) HUN	Richárd Nagy
99	MF	(Hungary) HUN	István Sándor

== Competitions ==
=== Overview ===
Competition	First match	Last match	Starting round	Final position	Record							
Competition	First match	Last match	Starting round	Final position	Pld	W	D	L	GF	GA	GD	Win %
Nemzeti Bajnokság I	30 July 2006	26 May 2007	Matchday 1	12th	30	11	3	16	46	58	−12	36.67
Magyar Kupa	20 September 2006	25 October 2006	Third round	Round of 32	2	1	0	1	2	4	−2	50.00
Total					32	12	3	17	48	62	−14	37.50

Source: Competitions

=== Nemzeti Bajnokság I ===
==== League table ====
Pos	Team	Pld	W	D	L	GF	GA	GD	Pts
10	Sopron	30	11	4	15	33	46	−13	37
11	Paks	30	10	7	13	34	38	−4	37
12	Tatabánya	30	11	3	16	46	58	−12	36
13	Győr	30	9	8	13	37	43	−6	35
14	Rákospalota	30	9	7	14	42	55	−13	34

Source: soccerway.com

==== Results summary ====
Overall								Home						Away					
Pld	W	D	L	GF	GA	GD	Pts	W	D	L	GF	GA	GD	W	D	L	GF	GA	GD
30	11	3	16	46	58	−12	36	9	0	6	35	28	+7	2	3	10	11	30	−19

Source: Hungarian Football Federation

==== Results by round ====
Round	1	2	3	4	5	6	7	8	9	10	11	12	13	14	15	16	17	18	19	20	21	22	23	24	25	26	27	28	29	30
Ground	H	A	H	A	H	A	H	H	A	H	A	H	A	H	A	A	H	A	H	A	H	A	A	H	A	H	A	H	A	H
Result	W	D	W	L	W	D	W	L	L	L	L	W	L	L	L	L	W	W	L	L	L	L	L	W	L	W	D	W	W	L
Position	4	3	2	4	4	4	4	4	6	8	9	6	7	10	11	12	10	9	9	12	13	14	15	15	15	15	15	12	12	12
Points	3	4	7	7	10	11	14	14	14	14	14	17	17	17	17	17	20	23	23	23	23	23	23	26	26	29	30	33	36	36

Source: Matches
A = Away; H = Home; W = Win; D = Draw; L = Loss

==== Matches ====
30 July 2006 1	Tatabánya	2–0	Sopron	Tatabánya
18:00 CEST (UTC+2)	Filó (yellow card) 21'; Jezdimirović (yellow card) 32'; Márkus 71', 82'	Report	Feczesin (yellow card) 52'; Sira (yellow card) 53'; Homei (red card) 84'	Stadium: Városi Stadion; Attendance: 3,000; Referee: Mihály Fábián; Assistant referees: Gyula Ortó, Oszkár Lémon; Fourth official: Gábor Péter Kovács

5 August 2006 2	Pécs	3–3	Tatabánya	Pécs
20:00 CEST (UTC+2)	Nógrádi 23'; Lukács 27'; Pest (yellow card) 35'; Dienes (yellow card) 45'; Lantos (yellow card) 78'; P. Horváth 84'	Report	Filó (yellow card) 16'; Kouemaha 56', 90+1', (yellow card) 90+2'; Márkus 68'; T. Nagy (yellow card) 87'; Bakrač (yellow card) 90'	Stadium: Stadion PMFC; Attendance: 1,300; Referee: Szabolcs Szilasi; Assistant referees: Zsolt Szalai, Oszkár Lémon; Fourth official: Norbert Kiss

19 August 2006 3	Tatabánya	3–0	Paks	Tatabánya
17:30 CEST (UTC+2)	Csopaki 19'; Nečas (yellow card) 22'; Kouemaha 44', 73'; Gulyás (yellow card) 90+1'	Report	Ambrus (yellow card) 45'; Barics (yellow card) 68'; S. Horváth (yellow card) 89'; Báló (yellow card) 90+4'; Tamási (yellow card) 90+4'	Stadium: Városi Stadion; Attendance: 2,000; Referee: Zsolt Szabó; Assistant referees: Dr. Péter Kovács, Gábor Takács; Fourth official: Gergő Király

28 August 2006 4	Vasas	2–0	Tatabánya	Budapest
18:00 CEST (UTC+2)	Unierzyski (yellow card) 36'; Pintér (yellow card) 39'; N. Németh 60'; Balog (yellow card) 78'; Pandur 89', (yellow card) 89'	Report	Bakrač (yellow card) 15'; Kouemaha (yellow card) 39'; Jezdimirović (yellow card) 42' (yellow-red card) 60'; Filó (yellow card) 90+2'	Stadium: Illovszky Rudolf Stadion; Attendance: 2,000; Referee: Zoltán Iványi; Assistant referees: Zsolt Szpisják, István Tóth; Fourth official: Attila Hegedűs

9 September 2006 5	Tatabánya	4–2	Kaposvár	Tatabánya
16:30 CEST (UTC+2)	Kouemaha 27'; Megyesi 44'; Vámosi 48'; Hajdú 57'	Report	Alves 59'; Zahorecz 74'	Stadium: Városi Stadion; Attendance: 2,800; Referee: Sándor Andó-Szabó; Assistant referees: Dr. Péter Kovács, Tamás Raff; Fourth official: Gergő Király

17 September 2006 6	Dunakanyar-Vác	2–2	Tatabánya	Vác
18:30 CEST (UTC+2)	Dudás (yellow card) 37'; Vámosi 50' (o.g.); Laskai 60'	Report	Kouemaha 9'; Gulyás (red card) 25'; Hajdú (yellow card) 45'; Dupai (yellow card) 66'; Vámosi (yellow card) 89'; Rajnay 90+2'	Stadium: Ligeti Stadion; Attendance: 2,000; Referee: Tamás Bognár; Assistant referees: Zoltán Kis, Attila Beidek; Fourth official: Tamás Bodac

23 September 2006 7	Tatabánya	2–1	Debrecen	Tatabánya
15:00 CEST (UTC+2)	Ndjodo 24'; Jezdimirović (yellow card) 40'; Megyesi 68'; Kouemaha (yellow card) 90+4'	Report	Komlósi (yellow card) 67'; T. Sándor 70'	Stadium: Városi Stadion; Attendance: 2,800; Referee: Sándor Gergely; Assistant referees: Zoltán Szalai, Szabolcs Deutsch; Fourth official: Miklós Dmeter

30 September 2006 8	Tatabánya	1–2	Honvéd	Tatabánya
16:00 CEST (UTC+2)	Jezdimirović (yellow card) 6' (yellow-red card) 35'; Hajdú (yellow card) 56'; Vámosi 58'; Megyesi (yellow card) 90'	Report	Hercegfalvi 44'; Angoua (yellow card) 56' (yellow-red card) 56'; Schrancz 73'; Koós (yellow card) 90+2'	Stadium: Városi Stadion; Attendance: 2,500; Referee: Csaba Imre Sápi; Assistant referees: Gábor Takács, Balázs Huszár; Fourth official: Gábor Bendik

13 October 2006 9	Fehérvár	2–0	Tatabánya	Székesfehérvár
19:00 CEST (UTC+2)	Sitku 18'; Farkas (yellow card) 63'; Alumona 69'	Report	Nečas (yellow card) 18'; Kerényi (yellow card) 66'; Filó (yellow card) 77'	Stadium: Sóstói Stadion; Attendance: 1,500; Referee: Mihály Fábián; Assistant referees: Dr. Péter Kovács, Imre Attila Nagy; Fourth official: Zsolt Kovács

21 October 2006 10	Tatabánya	2–4	MTK	Tatabánya
14:30 CEST (UTC+2)	Kouemaha 32', (yellow card) 35'; Poleksić (yellow card) 36'; Bakrač (yellow card) 45'; Ndjodo 48'; Mile (yellow card) 59'	Report	Kriston (yellow card) 20'; Kanta 37', 47', (yellow card) 41'; Hrepka 60'; Németh 62'; Rodenbücher (yellow card) 66'	Stadium: Városi Stadion; Attendance: 2,000; Referee: Ferenc Bede; Assistant referees: Zoltán Tompos, Tibor Vámos; Fourth official: Gábor Oláh

29 October 2006 11	Diósgyőr	3–1	Tatabánya	Miskolc
17:00 CET (UTC+1)	Filó 16' (o.g.); Farkas (yellow card) 43'; Binder 81'; Kéthévoama 90'	Report	Ndjodo (yellow card) 20'; Vámosi 39'	Stadium: Diósgyőri Stadion; Attendance: 3,000; Referee: Tamás Arany; Assistant referees: István Tóth, Zsolt Butkai; Fourth official: Tamás Bodac

4 November 2006 12	Tatabánya	2–1	Győr	Tatabánya
13:30 CET (UTC+1)	Ndjodo (yellow card) 37', (goal) 38'; Bakrač (yellow card) 50'; Hajdú 90'	Report	Bajzát 67'; P. Tóth (yellow card) 71'; Müller (yellow card) 75'	Stadium: Városi Stadion; Attendance: 1,500; Referee: Sándor Gergely; Assistant referees: Gyula Ortó, Dr. Zsolt Varga; Fourth official: Gábor Oláh

10 November 2006 13	Újpest	2–0	Tatabánya	Budapest
19:00 CET (UTC+1)	Vaskó (yellow card) 55'; Tisza 73'; Kőhalmi 90'	Report	Nečas (yellow card) 27'; Rajnay (yellow card) 41'; G. Gulyás (yellow card) 69'; Ndjodo (red card) 75'	Stadium: Szusza Ferenc Stadion; Attendance: 2,372; Referee: Péter Solmyosi; Assistant referees: Zoltán Szalai, Gábor Takács; Fourth official: Ákos Telek

18 November 2006 14	Tatabánya	2–3	Rákospalota	Tatabánya
13:00 CET (UTC+1)	Vámosi (yellow card) 35', (goal) 58'; Megyesi 81'	Report	Nyerges 11', 57'; Polonkai (yellow card) 70'; Torma 85'	Stadium: Városi Stadion; Attendance: 1,500; Referee: Károly Török; Assistant referees: Vencel Tóth II, Zsolt Butkai; Fourth official: Miklós Demeter

25 November 2006 15	Zalaegerszeg	1–0	Tatabánya	Zalaegerszeg
15:00 CET (UTC+1)	V. Sebők (yellow card) 7'; Francišković 90+9'	Report	Nečas (yellow card) 16'; Mile (yellow card) 61'	Stadium: ZTE Arena; Attendance: 5,000; Referee: István Mészáros; Assistant referees: László Viszokai, Zoltán Kovács; Fourth official: Krisztián Király

2 December 2006 16	Sopron	1–0	Tatabánya	Sopron
15:00 CET (UTC+1)	Feczesin 48' (pen.); Szabó (yellow card) 90'	Report	Bakrač (yellow card) 15'	Stadium: Káposztás utcai Stadion; Attendance: 1,000; Referee: Szabolcs Szilasi; Assistant referees: Oszkár Lémon, Gábor Takács; Fourth official: Krisztián Király

10 December 2006 17	Tatabánya	4–0	Pécs	Tatabánya
13:30 CET (UTC+1)	Ndjodo 34'; Kerényi (yellow card) 41'; Kouemaha 45'; Hajdú 71'; Vámosi 88'	Report	Lantos (red card) 62'; Sipos (yellow card) 80'	Stadium: Városi Stadion; Attendance: 1,500; Referee: Csaba Imre Sápi; Assistant referees: Imre Attila Nagy, Zoltán Szalai; Fourth official: Péter Berettyán

24 February 2007 18	Paks	0–1	Tatabánya	Paks
14:00 CET (UTC+1)		Report	Kouemaha 1'; Balogh (yellow card) 10'; Balázs (yellow card) 87'	Stadium: Fehérvári úti Stadion; Attendance: 1,500; Referee: Ferenc Bede; Assistant referees: Balázs Farkas, Zsolt Márton; Fourth official: Péter Herbály

3 March 2007 19	Tatabánya	1–3	Vasas	Tatabánya
15:00 CET (UTC+1)	Megyesi (yellow card) 26'; Szőke 28'	Report	Kenesei (yellow card) 38', (goal) 42'; Pintér (yellow card) 63'; Lázok 78'; Kincses 90+3'	Stadium: Városi Stadion; Attendance: 1,500; Referee: István Mészáros; Assistant referees: Imre Attila Nagy, László Viszokai; Fourth official: Gábor Oláh

10 March 2007 20	Kaposvár	4–0	Tatabánya	Kaposvár
16:00 CET (UTC+1)	Vasiljević 8'; P. Szakály 18'; Maróti (yellow card) 61'; Alves 71'; Oláh 83'	Report	Szilágyi (yellow card) 13'; Vámosi (yellow card) 50'; Kerényi (yellow card) 54'	Stadium: Rákóczi Stadion; Attendance: 1,500; Referee: Zoltán Iványi; Assistant referees: István Albert, Dr. Ádám Vári; Fourth official: Csaba Ursprung

17 March 2007 21	Tatabánya	1–2	Dunakanyar-Vác	Tatabánya
15:00 CET (UTC+1)	Filó (yellow card) 85'; Takács 90+2'	Report	Rusvay 34'; Palásthy 37'	Stadium: Városi Stadion; Attendance: 1,200; Referee: Csaba Imre Sápi; Assistant referees: Gyula Fehér, Tamás Raff; Fourth official: László Varga

30 March 2007 22	Debrecen	2–0	Tatabánya	Debrecen
19:00 CEST (UTC+2)	Sidibe 23', 50'; Bíró (yellow card) 55'; Zsolnai (yellow card) 88'	Report	Kichi (yellow card) 66'	Stadium: Oláh Gábor utcai Stadion; Attendance: 5,000; Referee: Richard Havrilla (Slovakia); Assistant referees: Rusbarski (Slovakia), Laskovsky (Slovakia); Fourth official: Mihály Fábián

7 April 2007 23	Honvéd	2–0	Tatabánya	Budapest
17:00 CEST (UTC+2)	Smiljanić (yellow card) 26' (yellow-red card) 88'; Mogyorósi (yellow card) 32'; Ivancsics 53'; Bogdanović 90+2'	Report	Balogh (yellow card) 8'; Rajnay (yellow card) 45'	Stadium: Bozsik József Stadion; Attendance: 4,000; Referee: Mihály Fábián; Assistant referees: Zoltán Pápai, Dr. Zsolt Varga; Fourth official: Gergely Sulyok

14 April 2007 24	Tatabánya	3–2	Fehérvár	Tatabánya
17:00 CEST (UTC+2)	Vámosi 53', (red card) 71'; Filó (yellow card) 59'; Kouemaha 65'; Kichi 89'	Report	Dajić 18', 42', (yellow card) 77'; G. Horváth II (yellow card) 55'	Stadium: Városi Stadion; Attendance: 1,200; Referee: István Vad; Assistant referees: Gyula Ortó, Tamás Márkus; Fourth official: Attila Tóth

21 April 2007 25	MTK	4–0	Tatabánya	Budapest
15:00 CEST (UTC+2)	Pál 4'; Németh 35', 77'; Pollák (red card) 68'; Rodenbücher 73'	Report	Nečas (yellow card) 12'	Stadium: Hidegkuti Nándor Stadion; Attendance: 2,000; Referee: Mihály Fábián; Assistant referees: Jozsef Heibl, Attila Forgács; Fourth official: Róbert Nagy

28 April 2007 26	Tatabánya	5–3	Diósgyőr	Tatabánya
16:00 CEST (UTC+2)	Hajdú 13', 30'; Kouemaha 36', 56'; Szilágyi 88'	Report	Simon 51'; Kéthévoama 85', 90+1'	Stadium: Városi Stadion; Attendance: 1,200; Referee: Zsolt Szabó; Assistant referees: Róbert Kispál, Zsolt Márton; Fourth official: Gergő Király

5 May 2007 27	Győr	0–0	Tatabánya	Győr
17:30 CEST (UTC+2)	Kovács (yellow card) 13'; Bank (yellow card) 19'; Mátyus (yellow card) 86'	Report	Rajnay (yellow card) 75'	Stadium: ETO Park; Attendance: 3,000; Referee: Csaba Imre Sápi; Assistant referees: Zoltán Tompos, Péter Berettyán; Fourth official: Gábor Oláh

12 May 2007 28	Tatabánya	3–2	Újpest	Tatabánya
15:00 CEST (UTC+2)	Filó 50'; Megyesi 72'; Kouemaha 90+3'	Report	Tisza 26'; Z. Kovács I (yellow card) 26', (goal) 87'; Erős (red card) 90+3'	Stadium: Városi Stadion; Attendance: 3,000; Referee: Zoltán Iványi; Assistant referees: Balázs Farkas, Dr. Ádám Vári; Fourth official: Attila Tóth

19 May 2007 29	Rákospalota	2–4	Tatabánya	Budapest
18:00 CEST (UTC+2)	Nyerges 38', 80'; Kapcsos (yellow card) 42'; Polonkai (yellow card) 50'; Sallai (yellow card) 62'	Report	Kichi 22', 56'; Filó (yellow card) 54'; Balogh 65'; Hajdú 84'	Stadium: Budai II. László Stadion; Attendance: 1,200; Referee: Tamás Arany; Assistant referees: László Viszokai, Attila Forgács; Fourth official: Gábor Oláh

26 May 2007 30	Tatabánya	0–3	Zalaegerszeg	Tatabánya
18:00 CEST (UTC+2)	Filó (yellow card) 52'; Vámosi (yellow card) 70'; Weisz (red card) 80'	Report	Balázs 21', 63'; Kocsárdi 81' (pen.)	Stadium: Városi Stadion; Attendance: 3,000; Referee: Mihály Fábián; Assistant referees: Dr. Péter Kovács, Attila Kelemen; Fourth official: Róbert Nagy

=== Magyar Kupa ===
20 September 2006 Third round	Vasas Pápa	1–2	Tatabánya	Pápa
15:30 CEST (UTC+2)	Stall	Report	Takács; Mile	Stadium: Vasas Pálya; Attendance: 300; Referee: Attila Lidi

25 October 2006 Round of 32	Pápa Termál	3–0	Tatabánya	Pápa
17:00 CEST (UTC+2)	Kozarek 4'; Farkas (yellow card) 21'; Ornoch 39', 73'	Report	Vámosi (yellow card) 8'; Gulyás (yellow card) 18' (yellow-red card) 40'; Rajnay (yellow card) 31' (yellow-red card) 37'; Bakrač (yellow card) 82'; Mile (yellow card) 87'	Stadium: Perutz Stadion; Attendance: 700; Referee: Miklós Demeter; Assistant referees: V. Kovács, Tamás Raff

== Statistics ==
=== Overall ===
Appearances (Apps) numbers are for appearances in competitive games only, including sub appearances.
Source: Competitions

No.	Player	Pos.	Nemzeti Bajnokság I				Magyar Kupa				Total			
No.	Player	Pos.	Apps	Goal	Booked	Sent off (straight red)	Apps	Goal	Booked	Sent off (straight red)	Apps	Goal	Booked	Sent off (straight red)
1	(Slovakia) Marián Postrk	GK	6				2				8			
2	(Hungary) Norbert Kerényi	DF	22		3		2				24		3	
3	(Hungary) Marcell Takács	MF	14	1			1	1			15	2		
4	(Serbia) Goran Jezdimirović	MF	11		4	2	2				13		4	2
5	(Hungary) Norbert Hajdú	MF	30	6	2		1				31	6	2	
6	(Hungary) Tamás Filó	DF	27	1	8		2				29	1	8	
7	(Hungary) István Csopaki	FW	8	1			1				9	1		
7	(Hungary) Tamás Romhányi	MF	1								1			
8	(Hungary) Viktor Simon	MF	3				1				4			
9	(Czech Republic) Jan Nečas	DF	27		5		1				28		5	
10	(Cameroon) Dorge Kouemaha	FW	25	13	4		1				26	13	4	
11	(Hungary) Attila Hullám	MF	7								7			
11	(Hungary) Tamás Nagy	FW	4		1		1				5		1	
13	(Hungary) Csaba Vámosi	DF	23	6	4	1	2		1		25	6	5	1
14	(Hungary) Attila Rajnay	DF	22	1	2		2		1	1	24	1	3	1
15	(Hungary) István Kovács	MF												
16	(Hungary) Krisztián Mile	MF	13		2		2	1	1		15	1	3	
16	(Hungary) Gábor Szilágyi	FW	10	1	1						10	1	1	
17	(Cameroon) Edouard Ndjodo	FW	12	4	2	1	2				14	4	2	1
18	(Hungary) Tibor Márkus	FW	2	3							2	3		
19	(Mexico) Kichi	FW	9	3	1						9	3	1	
21	(Hungary) Péter Ábel	MF	2								2			
21	(Hungary) Gábor Gulyás	MF	14		2	1	2		1	1	16		3	2
22	(Hungary) Viktor Dombai	FW	4				1				5			
30	(Cameroon) Joseph Ngalle	MF	9								9			
30	(Hungary) Tamás Weisz	MF	5			1					5			1
32	(Montenegro) Vojislav Bakrač	DF	13		5		1		1		14		6	
33	(Hungary) Zoltán Balogh	MF	12	1	2						12	1	2	
79	(Hungary) László Megyesi	MF	26	4	2						26	4	2	
82	(Montenegro) Vukašin Poleksić	GK	25		1						25		1	
84	(Hungary) József Balázs	FW	1		1						1		1	
87	(Hungary) János Szőke	FW	9	1							9	1		
88	(Hungary) Richárd Nagy	MF												
99	(Hungary) János Dupai	MF	6		1		1				7		1	
99	(Hungary) István Sándor	MF	8								8			
Own goals														
Totals				46	53	6		2	5	2		48	58	8

=== Clean sheets ===
			Clean sheets		
No.	Player	Games Played	Nemzeti Bajnokság I	Magyar Kupa	Total
82	(Montenegro) Vukašin Poleksić	25	4		4
1	(Slovakia) Marián Postrk	8	1		1
Totals			5		5
