= 2005–06 FC Tatabánya season =

Tatabánya
2005–06 season
- Manager: Tibor Sisa
- Stadium: Városi Stadion
- Nemzeti Bajnokság I: 5th
- Magyar Kupa: Round of 16
- Highest home attendance: 6,000 v Ferencváros (4 December 2005, Nemzeti Bajnokság I)
- Lowest home attendance: 1,500 (multiple competitive matches)
- Average home league attendance: 3,147
- Biggest win: 5–0 v Pápa (Away, 25 February 2006, Nemzeti Bajnokság I)
- Biggest defeat: 1–5 v Újpest (Away, 24 September 2005, Nemzeti Bajnokság I); 1–5 v Sopron (Away, 26 November 2005, Nemzeti Bajnokság I)

The 2005–06 season was Football Club Tatabánya's 43rd competitive season, 93rd season in existence as a football club and first season in the Nemzeti Bajnokság I after winning the second division in the previous season. In addition to the domestic league, Tatabánya participated in that season's editions of the Magyar Kupa.

== Squad ==
Squad at end of season

Note: Flags indicate national team as defined under FIFA eligibility rules; some limited exceptions apply. Players may hold more than one non-FIFA nationality.

No.	Pos.	Nation	Player
1	GK	SVK	Marían Postrk
2	DF	HUN	Norbert Kerényi
3	MF	HUN	Zoltán Balogh
5	MF	HUN	Norbert Hajdú
6	DF	HUN	Tamás Filó
7	MF	HUN	Imre Deme
8	MF	KOS	Ilir Nallbani
9	MF	HUN	János Dupai
10	MF	HUN	Zoltán Tóth
11	FW	HUN	Tamás Nagy
12	GK	HUN	Gábor Sándor
14	DF	HUN	Attila Rajnay
15	DF	HUN	Zoltán Vati

No.	Pos.	Nation	Player
16	MF	HUN	Krisztián Mile
18	FW	HUN	Tibor Márkus
20	MF	CMR	Nana Ahidjo
22	MF	HUN	Balázs Németh
25	FW	BRA	Jerson
30	MF	CMR	Joseph Ngalle
32	DF	MNE	Vojislav Bakrač
34	DF	HUN	Csaba Vámosi
40	FW	CMR	Dorge Kouemaha
77	FW	CMR	Edouard Ndjodo
79	MF	HUN	László Megyesi
82	GK	MNE	Vukašin Poleksić

== Competitions ==
=== Overview ===
Competition	First match	Last match	Starting round	Final position	Record							
Competition	First match	Last match	Starting round	Final position	Pld	W	D	L	GF	GA	GD	Win %
Nemzeti Bajnokság I	30 July 2005	3 June 2006	Matchday 1	5th	30	11	8	11	46	45	+1	36.67
Magyar Kupa	10 September 2005	9 November 2005	Second round	Round of 16	4	2	0	2	8	4	+4	50.00
Total					34	13	8	13	54	49	+5	38.24

Source: Competitions

=== Nemzeti Bajnokság I ===
==== League table ====
Pos	Team	Pld	W	D	L	GF	GA	GD	Pts	Qualification or relegation
3	Fehérvár	30	19	7	4	52	24	+28	64	Qualification for UEFA Cup first qualifying round (Note: Videoton FC Fehérvár won the 2005–06 Hungarian Cup and thereby qualified for the first qualifying round of the UEFA Cup.)
4	MTK	30	18	6	6	65	33	+32	60	
5	Tatabánya	30	11	8	11	46	45	+1	41	
6	Ferencváros (R)	30	10	11	9	43	38	+5	41	Relegated to Nemzeti Bajnokság II (Note: Ferencvárosi TC were relegated to the Nemzeti Bajnokság II because the club failed to comply with UEFA licensing rules.)
7	Kaposvár	30	10	7	13	35	41	−6	37	

Source: RSSSF
(R) Relegated

==== Results summary ====
Overall								Home						Away					
Pld	W	D	L	GF	GA	GD	Pts	W	D	L	GF	GA	GD	W	D	L	GF	GA	GD
30	11	8	11	46	45	+1	41	6	5	4	27	20	+7	5	3	7	19	25	−6

Source: Competitions

==== Results by round ====
Round	1	2	3	4	5	6	7	8	9	10	11	12	13	14	15	16	17	18	19	20	21	22	23	24	25	26	27	28	29	30
Ground	H	A	H	A	H	A	H	A	H	A	H	H	A	H	A	A	H	A	H	A	H	A	H	A	H	A	A	H	A	H
Result	D	L	W	L	D	L	W	D	W	W	D	L	L	L	W	W	L	D	L	D	D	L	D	W	W	L	L	W	W	W
Position	7	14	10	11	11	12	10	10	9	7	7	8	9	10	7	6	9	10	12	12	12	12	13	11	8	10	10	8	6	5
Points	1	1	4	4	5	5	8	9	12	15	16	16	16	16	19	22	22	23	23	24	25	25	26	29	32	32	32	35	38	41

A = Away; H = Home; W = Win; D = Draw; L = Loss

==== Matches ====
30 July 2005 1	Tatabánya	1–1	Pápa	Tatabánya
18:00 CEST (UTC+2)	Dupai (yellow card) 2'; Márkus 12'	Report	Újhegyi 16'; Müller (yellow card) 35'	Stadium: Városi Stadion; Attendance: 2,500; Referee: Attila Dubraviczky; Assistant referees: Kispál, I. A. Nagy

6 August 2005 2	Zalaegerszeg	3–0	Tatabánya	Zalaegerszeg
19:00 CEST (UTC+2)	V. Sebők 19' (pen.), 60' (pen.); Spalević (red card) 45'; Józsi 69'	Report	Filó (yellow card) 18' (yellow-red card) 60'; Kerényi (yellow card) 22'; Márkus (yellow card) 74'	Stadium: ZTE Arena; Attendance: 3,500; Referee: József Erdős; Assistant referees: P. Kovács, Z. Kovács

20 August 2005 3	Tatabánya	1–0	Kaposvár	Tatabánya
17:00 CEST (UTC+2)	Kerényi (yellow card) 8'; Márkus 74' (pen.); Dupai (yellow card) 90+1'	Report	Zsolnai (yellow card) 6'; Balajcza (yellow card) 73'; Petrók (yellow card) 77'; P. Máté I (yellow card) 83'; Kovácsevics (red card) 90+1'	Stadium: Városi Stadion; Attendance: 2,500; Referee: Attila Hanacsek; Assistant referees: P. Kovács, P. Szabó

27 August 2005 4	MTK	1–0	Tatabánya	Budapest
19:00 CEST (UTC+2)	Kanta (yellow card); Z. Szabó I 79' (o.g.)	Report	Filó (yellow card)	Stadium: Hidegkuti Nándor Stadion; Attendance: 1,200; Referee: István Vad; Assistant referees: Vámos, I. Tóth; Fourth official: Arany

18 September 2005 5	Tatabánya	3–3	Győr	Tatabánya
11:30 CEST (UTC+2)	Z. Tóth 43'; Rajnay (yellow card) 55'; Márkus 60', 78'; K. Németh I (yellow card) 86'	Report	Lendvai (yellow card) 13'; Priskin 28', 37', 90+3'; Mátyus (yellow card) 39'; Z. Varga II (yellow card) 76'	Stadium: Városi Stadion; Attendance: 1,500; Referee: Tamás Arany; Assistant referees: Z. Szalai, R. Kispál

24 September 2005 6	Újpest	5–1	Tatabánya	Budapest
19:00 CEST (UTC+2)	Erős 22'; G. Sándor 28'; Rajczi 32', 74'; Z. Kovács I 80'	Report	Z. Balogh (yellow card) 72'; Márkus 75'; Jerson (yellow card) 88'	Stadium: Szusza Ferenc Stadion; Attendance: 4,345; Referee: Péter Solymosi; Assistant referees: G. Takács, T. Vígh

1 October 2005 7	Tatabánya	2–1	Diósgyőr	Tatabánya
15:00 CEST (UTC+2)	Megyesi 80'; Márkus 88'	Report	Vitelki (yellow card) 11'; F. Horváth 28'; Mogyoródi (yellow card) 37'; Gašpar (yellow card) 80'; N. Farkas (yellow card) 84'	Stadium: Városi Stadion; Attendance: 2,000; Referee: János Makai; Assistant referees: I. Mészáros, I. Tóth

15 October 2005 8	Vasas	1–1	Tatabánya	Budapest
18:00 CEST (UTC+2)	Waltner 79', (yellow card) 85'	Report	Jerson (yellow card) 31'; Filó 33'	Stadium: Illovszky Rudolf Stadion; Attendance: 3,500; Referee: Sándor Gergely; Assistant referees: L. Varga II, I. A. Nagy

22 October 2005 9	Tatabánya	4–0	Rákospalota	Tatabánya
14:30 CEST (UTC+2)	Márkus 23', 66'; Kerényi (yellow card) 28'; Hajdú (yellow card) 42', (goal) 60'; Rajnay (yellow card) 51'; T. Nagy 74'	Report	Kapcsos (yellow card) 16'	Stadium: Városi Stadion; Attendance: 2,000; Referee: Szabolcs Saskőy; Assistant referees: Székely, Heibl

29 October 2005 10	Pécs	0–1	Tatabánya	Pécs
18:00 CEST (UTC+2)	Schindler (yellow card) 80'	Report	T. Nagy 19'; Megyesi (yellow card) 32'	Stadium: Stadion PMFC; Attendance: 1,500; Referee: Zoltán Szarka; Assistant referees: P. Szabó, Z. Kovács

6 November 2005 11	Tatabánya	3–3	Debrecen	Tatabánya
13:30 CET (UTC+1)	Filó (yellow card) 11'; T. Nagy 54'; Márkus 59', 84' (pen.); Vati (yellow card) 67'	Report	Z. Kiss I (yellow card) 13', (goal) 80'; Halmosi 50', (yellow card) 84'; Madar (yellow card) 64'; Ferenczi 67' (pen.)	Stadium: Városi Stadion; Attendance: 3,500; Referee: Mihály Fábián; Assistant referees: Gy. Ortó, R. Kispál

20 November 2005 12	Tatabánya	0–1	Fehérvár	Tatabánya
11:30 CET (UTC+1)	Filó (yellow card) 17'; Rizvanolli (yellow card) 83'	Report	B. Farkas II (yellow card) 21'; Sitku (yellow card) 44'; K. Németh I 67' (o.g.)	Stadium: Városi Stadion; Attendance: 3,500; Referee: Attila Hanacsek; Assistant referees: P. Kovács, I. A. Nagy

26 November 2005 13	Sopron	5–1	Tatabánya	Sopron
17:00 CET (UTC+1)	Bagoly 15', 51', 61'; A. Horváth I 28'; Demjén 33'; Fehér (yellow card) 43'	Report	Kerényi (yellow card) 1'; Márkus 47'; Jerson (yellow card) 75'; Z. Balogh (yellow card) 88'	Stadium: Káposztás utcai Stadion; Attendance: 1,500; Referee: István Vad; Assistant referees: Tompos, Takács

4 December 2005 14	Tatabánya	2–3	Ferencváros	Tatabánya
13:30 CET (UTC+1)	Z. Balogh (yellow card) 30'; Deme 33'; Márkus 60'	Report	Bartha (yellow card) 8'; Timár 13', (yellow card) 13'; Csepregi (yellow card) 44'; Jovánczai 68'; Szalai 82'	Stadium: Városi Stadion; Attendance: 6,000; Referee: Péter Solymosi; Assistant referees: P. Szabó, Z. Kovács

10 December 2005 15	Honvéd	1–3	Tatabánya	Budapest
15:00 CET (UTC+1)	Venczel 5'; Genito (yellow card) 8'; Bojtor (yellow card) 9'; Z. Kovács II (yellow card) 39'	Report	Z. Szabó I (yellow card) 11'; Jerson 18', (yellow card) 51'; Filó (yellow card) 19', (goal) 72'; Márkus 80'	Stadium: Bozsik József Stadion; Attendance: 2,000; Referee: Attila Dubraviczky; Assistant referees: I. A. Nagy, I. Tóth

25 February 2006 16	Pápa	0–5	Tatabánya	Pápa
16:00 CET (UTC+1)	L. Gaál (yellow card) 28' (yellow-red card) 46'; D. Varga (yellow card) 85'	Report	Hajdú 5', 44'; Mumba 20' (o.g.); Kouemaha 35'; Deme 36'; Filó (yellow card) 87'	Stadium: Perutz Stadion; Attendance: 1,600; Referee: István Vad; Assistant referees: Kispál, Szalay

4 March 2006 17	Tatabánya	0–1	Zalaegerszeg	Tatabánya
14:30 CET (UTC+1)		Report	L. Nagy 78'	Stadium: Városi Stadion; Attendance: 2,500; Referee: Attila Hanacsek; Assistant referees: Szpisják, P. Tóth

11 March 2006 18	Kaposvár	1–1	Tatabánya	Kaposvár
16:00 CET (UTC+1)	Zsolnai 26'; Vasiljević (yellow card) 27'	Report	Márkus 12'; Z. Balogh (yellow card) 78'; Deme (yellow card) 90'	Stadium: Rákóczi Stadion; Attendance: 1,500; Referee: Ferenc Bede; Assistant referees: L. Varga II, Z. Tompos

18 March 2006 19	Tatabánya	0–1	MTK	Tatabánya
15:00 CET (UTC+1)		Report	B. Balogh (yellow card) 10'; Hrepka 70'	Stadium: Városi Stadion; Attendance: 3,000; Referee: János Makai; Assistant referees: Kispál, Székely

24 March 2006 20	Győr	0–0	Tatabánya	Győr
19:00 CET (UTC+1)		Report	Rajnay (yellow card) 64'; Z. Tóth (yellow card) 77'	Stadium: Stadion ETO; Attendance: 1,500; Referee: Péter Solymosi; Assistant referees: P. Hegyi, Kispál

1 April 2006 21	Tatabánya	1–1	Újpest	Tatabánya
15:00 CEST (UTC+2)	Z. Tóth 26'; Deme (yellow card) 58'; Z. Balogh (yellow card) 89'	Report	Hullám (yellow card) 42'; B. Tóth (yellow card) 64'; N. Tóth 74'	Stadium: Városi Stadion; Attendance: 5,000; Referee: István Vad; Assistant referees: P. Szabó, Z. Kovács

8 April 2006 22	Diósgyőr	1–0	Tatabánya	Miskolc
17:00 CEST (UTC+2)	Binder 65'	Report	Z. Balogh (yellow card) 55'; Z. Tóth (yellow card) 67'; Rajnay (yellow card) 90'	Stadium: Diósgyőri Stadion; Attendance: 3,000; Referee: István Mészáros; Assistant referees: Gaál, Z. Szalai

15 April 2006 23	Tatabánya	2–2	Vasas	Tatabánya
15:00 CEST (UTC+2)	Nallbani (yellow card) 7'; Kerényi 36', 77'; Ngalle (yellow card) 90'	Report	Vámosi (yellow card) 15'; Z. Pintér (yellow card) 27'; Fehér (yellow card) 44'; Filó 58' (o.g.); H. Rósa (yellow card) 87'; Waltner 90'	Stadium: Városi Stadion; Attendance: 3,500; Referee: Mihály Fábián; Assistant referees: Ortó, Márkus

22 April 2006 24	Rákospalota	0–2	Tatabánya	Budapest
17:00 CEST (UTC+2)	Dinka (yellow card) 26'; Sallai (yellow card) 40'; G. Nagy I (yellow card) 48'	Report	Vámosi 5'; Ngalle 18'; Megyesi (yellow card) 38'	Stadium: Budai II. László Stadion; Attendance: 1,200; Referee: Csaba Imre Sápi; Assistant referees: Hegyi, P. Szabó

29 April 2006 25	Tatabánya	2–0	Pécs	Tatabánya
17:00 CEST (UTC+2)	Filó (yellow card) 34'; Márkus 48', 70'	Report	Szekeres (yellow card) 68'	Stadium: Városi Stadion; Attendance: 2,200; Referee: Szabolcs Szilasi; Assistant referees: T. Vígh, Világi

6 May 2006 26	Debrecen	1–0	Tatabánya	Debrecen
19:00 CEST (UTC+2)	Bogdanović 32'; Szatmári (yellow card) 33'	Report	Megyesi (yellow card) 59'; Bakrač (yellow card) 69'; Kerényi (yellow card) 76'	Stadium: Oláh Gábor utcai Stadion; Attendance: 9,000; Referee: Károly Török; Assistant referees: T. Márkus, Z. Márton

13 May 2006 27	Fehérvár	4–1	Tatabánya	Székesfehérvár
15:00 CEST (UTC+2)	G. Horváth II (yellow card) 15'; Koller (yellow card) 21'; Sitku 24'; Kuttor 33'; Alumona (red card) 39'; Csizmadia 54' (pen.); Schwarcz 76'; B. Farkas II (yellow card) 82'	Report	Vámosi 14' (pen.); Z. Balogh (yellow card) 30' (yellow-red card) 39'; Mile (yellow card) 49'	Stadium: Sóstói Stadion; Attendance: 2,925; Referee: Mihály Fábián; Assistant referees: J. Heibl, T. Vámos

20 May 2006 28	Tatabánya	3–2	Sopron	Tatabánya
18:00 CEST (UTC+2)	Márkus 17', 53'; Filó (yellow card) 32'; Kouemaha 85'	Report	Costișor 11'; Rajnay 24' (o.g.); Sifter (yellow card) 40'; Demjén (yellow card) 46'	Stadium: Városi Stadion; Attendance: 4,000; Referee: József Erdős; Assistant referees: P. Szabó, R. Kispál

27 May 2006 29	Ferencváros	2–3	Tatabánya	Budapest
19:00 CEST (UTC+2)	Lipcsei 28' (pen.); Lazić (yellow card) 82'; Bajevski 90'; Timár (red card) 90+1'	Report	Filó (yellow card) 28'; Megyesi 31'; Deme 35', 45'; Dupai (yellow card) 62'; Kerényi (yellow card) 87'	Stadium: Üllői úti Stadion; Attendance: 2,500; Referee: Sándor Andó-Szabó; Assistant referees: István Albert, Lajos L. Tóth

3 June 2006 30	Tatabánya	3–1	Honvéd	Tatabánya
18:00 CEST (UTC+2)	Filó 34'; Márkus 68'; Z. Tóth 74', (yellow card) 74'; Bakrač (yellow card) 78'; Kerényi (yellow card) 87'	Report	Angoua (yellow card) 33'; Csobánki 35'	Stadium: Városi Stadion; Attendance: 3,500; Referee: Tamás Bognár; Assistant referees: I. A. Nagy, Raff

=== Magyar Kupa ===
10 September 2005 Second round	Pénzügyőr	0–3	Tatabánya	Budapest
16:00 CEST (UTC+2)		Report	Z. Tóth (yellow card); Márkus; Hajdú; Jerson	Stadium: Pasaréti út Attendance: 200; Referee: Károly Török; Assistant referees: Tompos, K. Selmeczi

21 September 2005 Third round	Gyirmót	0–4	Tatabánya	Győr
15:30 CEST (UTC+2)	Füsi (yellow card); A. Tóth (yellow card)	Report	K. Németh I (yellow card); T. Nagy 3'; Z. Tóth 37'; Hajdú 62', 84'	Stadium: Ménfői úti Stadion; Attendance: 500; Referee: József Erdős; Assistant referees: B. Gaál, Kerékgyártó

==== Round of 16 ====
26 October 2005 First leg	Tatabánya	0–2	Debrecen	Tatabánya
14:00 CEST (UTC+2)	Deme (yellow card); T. Nagy (yellow card)	Report	B. Virág (yellow card); Éger (yellow card); Hegedűs (yellow card); Hristov 14'; Dzsudzsák 54', (yellow card)	Stadium: Városi Stadion; Attendance: 1,500; Referee: Attila Dubraviczky; Assistant referees: I. Nagy I, J. Balogh

9 November 2005 Second leg	Debrecen	2–1 (4–1 agg.)	Tatabánya	Debrecen
18:00 CET (UTC+1)	Szatmári (yellow card); Sidibe 7'; Hegedűs 88', (yellow card)	Report	Filó (yellow card); Forgó (yellow card); Z. Balogh (yellow card); Kerényi (yellow card); Dupai 66' (pen.)	Stadium: Oláh Gábor utcai Stadion; Attendance: 7,500; Referee: József Erdős; Assistant referees: I. Tóth, Z. Szalai
Note: Debrecen won 4–1 on aggregate.
