= István Csopaki =

Hungarian footballer (born 1983)

Personal information
- Date of birth: 3 September 1983 (age 43)
- Place of birth: Budapest, Hungary
- Height: 1.70 m (5 ft 7 in)
- Positions: Midfielder; striker

Youth career
- –2001: Ferencváros
- 2001–2002: Vasas

Senior career*
| Years | Team | Apps | (Gls) |
| 2002–2003 | Újpest-Fót | 31 | (5) |
| 2003–2004 | BKV Előre | 34 | (8) |
| 2004–2006 | Rákospalota | 48 | (9) |
| 2006–2007 | Tatabánya | 8 | (1) |
| 2007 | Dunakanyar-Vác | 7 | (0) |
| 2007–2008 | Siófok | 11 | (1) |
| 2007–2008 | Siófok II | 8 | (5) |
| 2008–2011 | BKV Előre | 80 | (44) |
| 2011–2012 | Gyirmót | 7 | (3) |
| 2012–2013 | Mank | 24 | (4) |
| 2013–2014 | Újbuda | 14 | (6) |
| 2014–2015 | Diósd | 1 | (0) |
| 2015 | Tököl | 3 | (0) |
| 2021 | Mány | 2 | (0) |
| Total | | 278 | (86) |

International career
| 2000 | Hungary U16 | 3 | (0) |
| 2000–2001 | Hungary U17 | 13 | (3) |
| 2001 | Hungary U19 | 5 | (1) |
| 2002–2003 | Hungary U20 | 8 | (1) |
| 2004–2005 | Hungary U21 | 2 | (0) |
- * Club domestic league appearances and goals

István Csopaki (born 3 September 1983) is a Hungarian former professional footballer who played as a midfielder and striker. He represented Hungary at multiple youth levels from U16 through U21.

== Career ==
In the first half of the 2006–07 Nemzeti Bajnokság I season, Csopaki was with Tatabánya after joining the club from fellow top-flight side Rákospalota on 15 June 2006. In the second half of the season, he transferred to fellow Nemzeti Bajnokság I club Dunakanyar-Vác from Tatabánya as part of the club's efforts to avoid relegation.

On 21 January 2013, Csopaki signed for Nemzeti Bajnokság III Bakony group club Újbuda after deciding against a move to Nemzeti Bajnokság II side BKV Előre.

== Personal life ==
Following his playing career, Csopaki began working as the official team bus driver for MTK in 2017, a position previously held by his father. He has continued in this role into the mid-2020s, driving the squad to away matches while maintaining a close connection to the technical staff and players.

== Career statistics ==
=== Club ===
Appearances and goals by club, season and competition
| Club | Season | League | | | National cup (Note: Includes Magyar Kupa) | | League cup (Note: Includes Ligakupa) | | Other | | Total | |
| Club | Season | Division | Apps | Goals | Apps | Goals | Apps | Goals | Apps | Goals | Apps | Goals |
|---|---|---|---|---|---|---|---|---|---|---|---|---|
| Újpest-Fót | 2002–03 | Nemzeti Bajnokság II | 31 | 5 | 2 | 0 | — | | — | | 33 | 5 |
| BKV Előre | 2003–04 | Nemzeti Bajnokság II | 34 | 8 | 3 | 0 | — | | — | | 37 | 8 |
| Rákospalota | 2004–05 | Nemzeti Bajnokság II | 24 | 9 | 1 | 0 | — | | — | | 25 | 9 |
| Rákospalota | 2005–06 | Nemzeti Bajnokság I | 24 | 0 | 4 | 3 | — | | — | | 28 | 3 |
| Rákospalota | Total | | 48 | 9 | 5 | 3 | — | | — | | 53 | 12 |
| Tatabánya | 2006–07 | Nemzeti Bajnokság I | 8 | 1 | 1 | 0 | — | | — | | 9 | 1 |
| Dunakanyar-Vác | 2006–07 | Nemzeti Bajnokság I | 7 | 0 | — | | — | | — | | 7 | 0 |
| Siófok | 2007–08 | Nemzeti Bajnokság I | 11 | 1 | — | | 11 | 1 | — | | 22 | 2 |
| Siófok II | 2007–08 | Nemzeti Bajnokság III | 8 | 5 | — | | — | | — | | 8 | 5 |
| BKV Előre | 2008–09 | Nemzeti Bajnokság II | 30 | 17 | 1 | 1 | — | | — | | 31 | 18 |
| BKV Előre | 2009–10 | Nemzeti Bajnokság II | 20 | 8 | 1 | 1 | — | | — | | 21 | 9 |
| BKV Előre | 2010–11 | Nemzeti Bajnokság II | 30 | 19 | 2 | 0 | — | | — | | 32 | 19 |
| BKV Előre | Total | | 80 | 44 | 4 | 2 | — | | — | | 84 | 46 |
| Gyirmót | 2011–12 | Nemzeti Bajnokság II | 7 | 3 | 1 | 1 | 2 | 0 | — | | 10 | 4 |
| Mank | 2011–12 | Gebietsliga West | 12 | 3 | — | | — | | — | | 12 | 3 |
| Mank | 2012–13 | Gebietsliga West | 12 | 1 | — | | — | | — | | 12 | 1 |
| Mank | Total | | 24 | 4 | — | | — | | — | | 24 | 4 |
| Újbuda | 2012–13 | Nemzeti Bajnokság III | 11 | 6 | — | | — | | 1 (Note: Appearance in Magyar Kupa qualifying rounds) | 0 | 12 | 6 |
| Újbuda | 2013–14 | Nemzeti Bajnokság III | 3 | 0 | — | | — | | — | | 3 | 0 |
| Újbuda | Total | | 14 | 6 | — | | — | | 1 | 0 | 15 | 6 |
| Diósd | 2014–15 | Nemzeti Bajnokság III | 1 | 0 | — | | — | | — | | 1 | 0 |
| Tököl | 2014–15 | Nemzeti Bajnokság III | 3 | 0 | — | | — | | — | | 3 | 0 |
| Mány | 2020–21 | Megyei Bajnokság I | 2 | 0 | — | | — | | — | | 2 | 0 |
| Career total | | | 278 | 86 | 16 | 6 | 13 | 1 | 1 | 0 | 308 | 93 |

=== International ===
Appearances and goals by national team and year
| Team | Year | Total | |
| Team | Year | Apps | Goals |
|---|---|---|---|
| Hungary U16 | 2000 | 3 | 0 |
| Hungary U17 | 2000 | 5 | 0 |
| Hungary U17 | 2001 | 8 | 3 |
| Hungary U17 | Total | 13 | 3 |
| Hungary U19 | 2001 | 5 | 1 |
| Hungary U20 | 2002 | 2 | 0 |
| Hungary U20 | 2003 | 6 | 1 |
| Hungary U20 | Total | 8 | 1 |
| Hungary U21 | 2004 | 1 | 0 |
| Hungary U21 | 2005 | 1 | 0 |
| Hungary U21 | Total | 2 | 0 |
| Career total | | 31 | 5 |

Results list Hungary's goal tally first.

List of youth international goals scored by István Csopaki
| No. | Team | Cap | Date | Venue | Opponent | Result | Competition | Ref. |
|---|---|---|---|---|---|---|---|---|
| 1 | Hungary U17 | 8 | 6 March 2001 | Dekani, Slovenia | Slovenia U17 | 2–1 | Friendly | |
| 2 | Hungary U17 | 10 | 4 April 2001 | Csepel, Hungary | England U17 Schoolboys | 2–0 | Friendly | |
| 3 | Hungary U17 | 13 | 10 May 2001 | Myjava, Slovakia | Turkey U17 | 2–3 | Piešťany International Youth Tournament | |
| 1 | Hungary U19 | 1 | 4 September 2001 | Bajmok, FR Yugoslavia | Netherlands U19 | 1–3 | Subotica International Youth Tournament | |
| 1 | Hungary U20 | 7 | 18 November 2003 | Szentgotthárd, Hungary | Slovenia U20 | 2–2 | Alps–Adriatic MIROP Cup | |

== Honours ==
Individual

- Nemzeti Bajnokság II – West top scorer: 2010–11 (shared)
