= Milan Pastva =

Slovak footballer

Personal information
- Full name: Milan Pastva
- Date of birth: 1 July 1980 (age 46)
- Place of birth: Čadca, Czechoslovakia
- Height: 1.70 m (5 ft 7 in)
- Position: Midfielder

Team information
- Current team: FC Baník Horná Nitra

Youth career
- ŠKF Baník Handlová
- 1993–1999: Prievidza

Senior career*
| Years | Team | Apps | (Gls) |
| 2000–2001 | Prievidza | | |
| 2001–2003 | Rimavská Sobota | | |
| 2003 | FBK Kaunas | | |
| 2004 | FK Šilutė | | |
| 2005–2007 | AS Trenčín | 62 | (1) |
| 2007 | FC Tatabánya | 10 | (1) |
| 2008 | PŠC Pezinok | | |
| 2008–2009 | Prievidza | | |
| 2009 | Honvéd | 4 | (0) |
| 2012– | Horná Nitra | | |

Managerial career
- 2010–: Horná Nitra (youth)
- * Club domestic league appearances and goals as of 9 August 2012

Milan Pastva (born 1 July 1980 in Čadca) is a Slovak football midfielder who currently plays for the Majstrovstvá regiónu club FC Baník Horná Nitra.

== Club career ==
Pastva was born in Čadca, but moved to Handlova at the age of one. He also started playing football there, and at the age of 13 he moved to the Prievidza academy.

=== FBK Kaunas ===
After playing for local clubs Prievidza and Rimavská Sobota, Pastva moved to the Lithuanian club FBK Kaunas. With the club, he lifted the championship cup twice and in the 2003/04 season he also appeared in two preliminary rounds of the Champions League against HB Torshavn and the Scottish Celtic Glasgow.

In 2005, Pastva played with AS Trenčín.

=== Honvéd Budapest ===
In 2009, Pastva joined Hungarian club Honvéd Budapest, signing a three-and-a-half-year contract. With the club, he also appeared in the UEFA Cup qualifiers against Fenerbahce Istanbul.

=== After football ===
After getting into a serious carcrash, Pastva decided to quit playing professional football and later became a youth coach for Banik Prievidza.

== Honours ==
=== FBK Kaunas ===
- A Lyga (2): 2003, 2004
