= Tamás Ferenc Béres =

Hungarian footballer

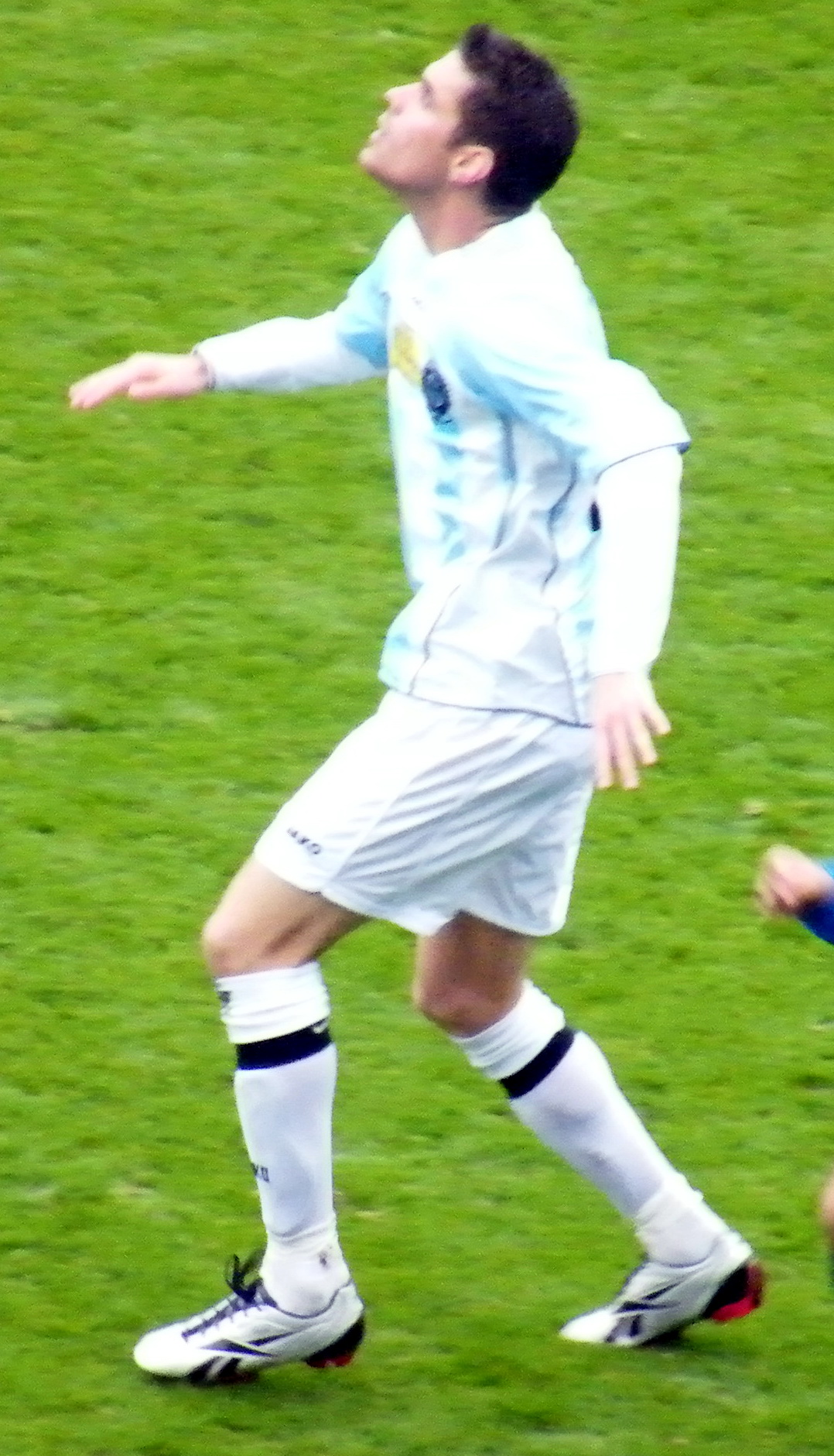

Personal information
- Full name: Tamás Ferenc Béres
- Date of birth: 15 April 1982 (age 44)
- Place of birth: Hungary
- Height: 1.85 m (6 ft 1 in)
- Position: Striker

Team information
- Current team: Lombard-Pápa TFC
- Number: 11

Senior career*
Years	Team	Apps	(Gls)
2007–2009	FC Tatabánya	38	(16)
2009–	Lombard-Pápa TFC	1	(0)
- * Club domestic league appearances and goals

Tamás Ferenc Béres (born 15 April 1982) is a Hungarian football player who currently plays for Lombard-Pápa TFC.
