= Jan Nečas =

Czech footballer

Personal information
- Date of birth: 24 February 1977 (age 49)
- Place of birth: Brno, Czechoslovakia
- Height: 1.82 m (6 ft 0 in)
- Position: Midfielder

Senior career*
Years	Team	Apps	(Gls)
1995–1996	FC Zbrojovka Brno	10	(1)
1996–1997	FC Slovan Liberec	1	(0)
1996–1997	SK LeRK Prostějov	14	(2)
1998–1999	FK Arsenal Česká Lípa	15	(0)
1998–1999	FK Mladá Boleslav	10	(0)
1999–2000	FC Slovan Liberec	18	(0)
2000–2001	FC Viktoria Plzeň	12	(0)
2000–2003	Dukla Trenčín	64	(1)
2003–2004	FC Zbrojovka Brno	1	(0)
2003–2004	FC Zbrojovka Brno B	9	(0)
2004–2006	FC Nitra	53	(2)
2006–2007	FC Tatabánya	27	(0)
2007–2008	Kelantan FA	0	(0)
- * Club domestic league appearances and goals

Jan Nečas (born 24 February 1977) is a Czech former football player. He played in the Gambrinus liga for multiple teams and also played in the top flights of Slovakia and Hungary.
