= Balázs Balogh (footballer, born 1982) =

Hungarian footballer

Personal information
- Date of birth: 21 July 1982 (age 44)
- Place of birth: Budapest, Hungary
- Height: 1.92 m (6 ft 4 in)
- Position: Centre-back

Youth career
- 1994–2001: Újpest FC
- 2001–2002: Vasas SC

Senior career*
Years	Team	Apps	(Gls)
2002–2003	Pilisvörösvári LSE	30	(2)
2003–2006	Kiskunhalasi FC		
2006–2007	Vasas SC		
2007	1. FC Pforzheim	10	(0)
2007–2009	FC Tatabánya	18	(0)
2009–2012	KuPS	70	(1)
2012–2013	Lombard-Pápa TFC	15	(0)
2014	Ilves		
- * Club domestic league appearances and goals

Balázs Balogh (Hungarian pronunciation: [ˈbɒlaːʒ ˈbɒloɡ], born 21 July 1982) is a Hungarian former professional footballer who played as a centre-back for Vác FC.
