= Imre Deme =

Hungarian footballer

Personal information
- Full name: Imre Deme
- Date of birth: 3 August 1983 (age 43)
- Place of birth: Zalaegerszeg, Hungary
- Height: 1.78 m (5 ft 10 in)
- Position: Midfielder

Youth career
- 1993–1999: Ferencváros
- 1999–2000: Újpest

Senior career*
Years	Team	Apps	(Gls)
2000–2003	Újpest	12	(0)
2003	Marcali		
2003–2006	Tatabánya	54	(5)
2006–2009	Ferencváros	47	(2)
2009–2012	Tatabánya	78	(15)
2012–2017	Sopron	116	(25)
2017	USC Wallern		
2018–2020	ATSV Wöllersdorf		
2020–2021	SC Zillingtal		

International career
1999–2000	Hungary U-16	13	(1)
2001–2002	Hungary U-19		
2002–2003	Hungary U-21	12	(0)
- * Club domestic league appearances and goals

Imre Deme (born 3 August 1983, in Zalaegerszeg) is a retired Hungarian football player.

== Club career ==
=== Ferencváros ===
In 2006, Deme joined Ferencváros from Tatabánya. He played for the team from 2006 to 2009.
