= Norbert Kerényi =

Hungarian footballer

Personal information
- Full name: Norbert Kerényi
- Date of birth: 10 April 1976 (age 50)
- Place of birth: Budapest, Hungary
- Height: 1.84 m (6 ft 0 in)
- Position: Defender

Team information
- Current team: Rákosmenti KSK
- Number: 2

Senior career*
Years	Team	Apps	(Gls)
1997–1999	Békéscsaba 1912 Előre SE	56	(4)
1999–2001	Újpest FC	31	(1)
2001–2002	Vasas SC	30	(0)
2003–2004	RoPS	46	(1)
2005–2007	FC Tatabánya	57	(3)
2007–2008	Lombard-Pápa TFC	23	(2)
2008–2009	BFC Siófok	6	(0)
2009	SC Ortmann	?	(?)
2009–2011	Törteli KS	18	(3)
2011–	Rákosmenti KSK	24	(2)
- * Club domestic league appearances and goals as of 10 July 2012

Norbert Kerényi (born 10 April 1976) is a Hungarian football (defender) player who currently plays for Rákosmenti KSK.
