= Kichi (footballer) =

Mexican footballer (born 1985)

Personal information
- Full name: Juan Manuel Pérez Bernal
- Date of birth: 5 May 1985 (age 41)
- Place of birth: Tijuana, Mexico
- Height: 5 ft 1 in (1.55 m)
- Position: Forward

Team information
- Current team: Los Angeles Blues

Senior career*
Years	Team	Apps	(Gls)
2008	Dorados	4	(0)
2008–2010	FC Tatabánya	56	(22)
2013	Los Angeles Blues	21	(3)
2014–2015	San Diego Flash		
2016	North County Battalion		
- * Club domestic league appearances and goals

Juan Manuel Pérez Bernal (Note: In this Spanish name, the first or paternal surname is Pérez and the second or maternal family name is Bernal.) (born 5 May 1985), also known simply as Kichi, is a Mexican football player who played as a forward for the North County Battalion of the National Premier Soccer League in San Diego, California.
