= Gábor Szilágyi =

Hungarian footballer

Personal information
- Date of birth: 4 September 1981 (age 45)
- Place of birth: Eger, Hungary
- Height: 1.73 m (5 ft 8 in)
- Position: Striker

Senior career*
Years	Team	Apps	(Gls)
1998–2000	BVSC	15	(0)
2000	Jokerit	7	(1)
2001	HJK	4	(0)
2002	Hämeenlinna		
2003	KooTeePee	26	(13)
2004–2005	TPS	37	(8)
2006	KooTeePee	17	(2)
2007–2008	Tatabánya	16	(1)
2008–2009	Gyöngyös		
2009–2010	Jászfényszaru		
2010–2011	Szurdokpüspöki		
2011–2012	Gyöngyös		
2012	Markaz		
2012–2015	Domoszló		

International career
1998–1999	Hungary U-17	7	(0)
1999–2000	Hungary U-18	1	(0)
- * Club domestic league appearances and goals

Gábor Szilágyi (born 4 September 1981) is a Hungarian former footballer who played as striker.
