= Miroslav Kozák =

Slovak footballer

Personal information
- Date of birth: 30 October 1976 (age 50)
- Place of birth: Slovakia
- Position: Forward

Senior career*
Years	Team	Apps	(Gls)
–2000	ŠK Futura Humenné		
2000–2001	Žižkov	5	(0)
2001–2003	Žilina		
2002–2003	→ DAC (loan)		
2003	Trenčín		
2004	FC Petržalka		
2004–2005	Oghab		
2005–2007	Sanat Naft		
2007	Tatabánya	6	(0)
2008–2009	FK Bodva Moldava nad Bodvou		
- * Club domestic league appearances and goals

Miroslav Kozák (born 30 October 1976) is a Slovak former professional footballer who played as a forward. Besides Slovakia, he has played in the Czech Republic, Iran and Hungary.

== Career ==
In 2000, Kozák signed for Czech side Žižkov. In 2001, he signed for Žilina in the Slovak top flight. In 2002, he was sent on loan to Slovak second tier club DAC. Before the second half of 2003–04, Kozák signed for FC Petržalka in the Slovak top flight, helping them win the 2003–04 Slovak Cup. In 2004, he signed for Iranian second tier team Oghab.

In 2007, Kozák signed for Tatabánya in the Hungarian top flight, where he made six league appearances without scoring any goal. On 25 August 2007, he debuted for Tatabánya during a 7–0 loss to Fehérvár. In 2008, Kozák signed for Slovak third tier club FK Bodva Moldava nad Bodvou.
