= Gyula Grosics Stadium =

Stadium in Tatabánya, Hungary

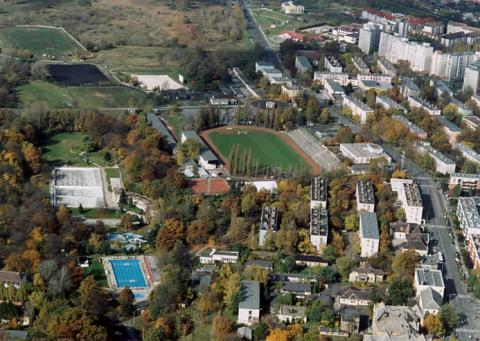
Városi Stadion

Gyula Grosics Stadium (Hungarian: Grosics Gyula Stadion, formerly Városi Stadion, literally Town Stadium) is a multi-use stadium in Tatabánya, Hungary. It is used mostly for football matches and is the home stadium of FC Tatabánya. The stadium is able to hold 15,500 people.

The stadium was named for Hungarian footballer Gyula Grosics in 2011.
