= Tamás Nagy (footballer, born 1976) =

Hungarian footballer

Personal information
- Full name: Tamás Nagy
- Date of birth: 6 June 1976 (age 50)
- Place of birth: Hungary
- Height: 1.80 m (5 ft 11 in)
- Position: Striker

Team information
- Current team: Rákospalotai EAC
- Number: 9

Senior career*
Years	Team	Apps	(Gls)
1993–1998	Csepel SC	–	(–)
1998	Slovan Bratislava	–	(–)
1998–1999	Csepel SC	9	(6)
1999–2001	Dunaújváros FC	53	(6)
2001–2002	FC Sopron	42	(3)
2002–2004	Győri ETO FC	28	(2)
2005–2007	FC Tatabánya	19	(3)
2007–2008	Rákospalotai EAC	10	(0)
2008	B36 Tórshavn	–	(–)
2008–2009	Rákospalotai EAC	–	(-)

International career
2000–2001	Hungary	2	(0)
- * Club domestic league appearances and goals

Tamás Nagy (born 6 June 1976) is a Hungarian football player who currently plays for Rákospalotai EAC.
