= László Megyesi =

Hungarian footballer

Personal information
- Date of birth: 2 May 1977 (age 49)
- Place of birth: Tatabánya, Hungary
- Height: 1.81 m (5 ft 11 in)
- Position: Midfielder

Youth career
- Tatabánya FC

Senior career*
| Years | Team | Apps | (Gls) |
| 2002–2005 | Békéscsabai Előre FC | 23 | (7) |
| 2005– | FC Tatabánya | | |
| 2008-February 2009 | Pécsi MFC | | |
- * Club domestic league appearances and goals as of 31 May 2003

László Megyesi (born 2 May 1977) is a Hungarian footballer who plays for FC Tatabánya as a midfielder.
