= Csaba Vámosi =

Hungarian footballer

Personal information
- Date of birth: 28 September 1975 (age 51)
- Height: 1.96 m (6 ft 5 in)
- Position: Defender

Team information
- Current team: Mezőkeresztes SE

Senior career*
| Years | Team | Apps | (Gls) |
| –1997 | Vác FC | | |
| 1997–1999 | Ferencvárosi TC | | |
| 1999–2000 | Győri ETO FC | | |
| 2001–2003 | FC Tatabánya | | |
| 2003–2005 | Budapest Honvéd FC | | |
| 2005 | Kecskeméti TE | | |
| 2005–2006 | Diósgyőri VTK | | |
| 2006–2007 | FC Tatabánya | | |
| 2007–2008 | Diósgyőri VTK | | |
| 2008–2009 | FC Tatabánya | | |
| 2009–2012 | Mezőkövesd-Zsóry SE | | |
| 2012–2013 | Nagybátonyi SC | | |
| 2013–2014 | Nyíradony VVTK | | |
| 2014–2016 | Nagyecsed RSE | | |
| 2016–2018 | Füzesabonyi SC | | |
| 2018–2019 | Parasznya SC | | |
| 2019– | Mezőkeresztes SE | | |
- * Club domestic league appearances and goals

Csaba Vámosi (born 28 September 1975) is a Hungarian football defender.
