= 2010–11 Szombathelyi Haladás season =

Haladás
2010–11 season
- Manager: Aurél Csertői (until 15 October); Zoltán Aczél (from 16 October)
- Stadium: Rohonci út
- Nemzeti Bajnokság I: 8th
- Magyar Kupa: Round of 16
- Ligakupa: Semi-finals
- Top goalscorer: League: Krisztián Kenesei (11); All: Krisztián Kenesei (14)
- Highest home attendance: 6,000 (multiple Nemzeti Bajnokság I matches)
- Lowest home attendance: 150 v Videoton (2 March 2011, Magyar Kupa)
- Average home league attendance: 3,966
- Biggest win: 4–0 v Siófok (Home, 23 October 2010, Nemzeti Bajnokság I)
- Biggest defeat: 1–5 v Pápa (Away, 20 August 2010, Nemzeti Bajnokság I)

The 2010–11 season was Szombathelyi Haladás's 55th competitive season, 3rd consecutive season in the Nemzeti Bajnokság I and 91st year in existence as a football club. In addition to the domestic league, Haladás participated in that season's editions of the Magyar Kupa and the Ligakupa.

The team started the season under new management by Aurél Csertői, who replaced Antal Róth on 23 July 2010. On 15 October, Csertői was sacked after failing to meet the four points required to retain his position. A day later, Zoltán Aczél was appointed as the successor who last managed Szigetszentmiklós.

== Squad ==
Squad at end of season

Note: Flags indicate national team as defined under FIFA eligibility rules; some limited exceptions apply. Players may hold more than one non-FIFA nationality.

No.	Pos.	Nation	Player
1	GK	HUN	Dániel Totka
2	MF	HUN	Zoltán Csontos
3	DF	HUN	Gábor Nagy I
4	MF	HUN	Gábor Rajos
5	MF	HUN	Gábor Korolovszky
6	DF	HUN	Dániel Lengyel
7	MF	HUN	Balázs Molnár
8	MF	HUN	Gábor Nagy II
9	FW	HUN	Márton Oross
10	MF	HUN	István Kovács
11	MF	HUN	Ignác Irhás
12	DF	HUN	Szilárd Devecseri
13	MF	HUN	Péter Halmosi
14	FW	HUN	Roland Ugrai
15	DF	HUN	Péter Tóth
16	FW	HUN	Máté Skriba
17	FW	HUN	Attila Simon
18	MF	HUN	Norbert Sipos

No.	Pos.	Nation	Player
19	MF	HUN	Bence Gyurján
20	FW	HUN	Krisztián Kenesei
21	MF	HUN	Attila Szakály
22	DF	HUN	Richárd Guzmics
23	MF	HUN	Szabolcs Schimmer
25	MF	SVK	Branislav Fodrek
26	MF	HUN	Márk Jagodics
27	DF	HUN	Szabolcs Szvoboda
29	MF	SVK	Marián Sluka
32	MF	HUN	Tamás Szeles
33	DF	HUN	Márk Farkas
37	FW	HUN	Csaba Lenkó
46	MF	HUN	Ádám Simon
66	GK	HUN	Dániel Rózsa
84	MF	HUN	Norbert Lattenstein
90	DF	HUN	Bence Iszlai
91	GK	HUN	Roland Mursits

== Transfers ==
=== Transfers in ===
Transfer window	Pos.	No.	Player	From
Summer	MF	5	(Hungary) Gábor Korolovszky	(Cyprus) Aris Limassol
Summer	MF	13	(Serbia) Nemanja Obrić	(Serbia) Red Star Belgrade
Summer	MF	25	(Slovakia) Branislav Fodrek	(Slovakia) Petržalka
Winter	GK	1	(Hungary) Dániel Totka	(Cyprus) APEP
Winter	DF	3	(Hungary) Gábor Nagy I	(Cyprus) APEP
Winter	MF	13	(Hungary) Péter Halmosi	(England) Hull City
Winter	MF	19	(Hungary) Bence Gyurján	Illés Akadémia
Winter	DF	27	(Hungary) Szabolcs Szvoboda	Illés Akadémia
Winter	DF	33	(Hungary) Márk Farkas	Illés Akadémia

=== Transfers out ===
Transfer window	Pos.	No.	Player	To
Summer	FW	55	(Serbia) Igor Bogdanović	Hajdúböszörmény
Summer	DF	77	(Hungary) Attila Kuttor	Retired
Winter	GK	1	(Hungary) Tamás Szép	(Austria) ASK Mannersdorf
Winter	MF	13	(Serbia) Nemanja Obrić	Released (Note: Joined Al-Hazem.)
Winter	DF	26	(Hungary) Zsolt Kovács	Released

=== Loans in ===
Transfer window	Pos.	No.	Player	From	End date

=== Loans out ===
Transfer window	Pos.	No.	Player	To	End date
Summer	FW	16	(Hungary) Máté Skriba	MTK	Middle of season
Summer	DF	26	(Hungary) Zsolt Kovács	Bük	Middle of season
Summer	GK	30	(Hungary) Gergő Gőcze	Kozármisleny	End of season
Winter	DF	21	(Hungary) Zoltán Nagy	Tatabánya	End of season
Winter	FW	32	(Hungary) Ferenc Rácz	Ajka	End of season

== Pre-season and friendlies ==
3 July 2010 Friendly	Mattersburg (Austria)	1–1	(Hungary) Haladás	Deutsch Schützen-Eisenberg, Austria
	Seidl		Ugrai	Attendance: 500; Referee: Schmiedt (Austria)

6 July 2010 Friendly	Haladás (Hungary)	1–0	(Slovakia) Košice	Lanzenkirchen, Austria
	Molnár (pen.)			Attendance: 50; Referee: Hanzl (Austria)

21 July 2010 Friendly	Haladás	2–1	Ajka	Szombathely
18:00 CEST (UTC+2)	Kenesei; Ugrai		Mihalecz	Stadium: Rohonci út Attendance: 300; Referee: Á. Papp

31 July 2010 Friendly	Haladás (Hungary)	2–1	(Germany) Werder Bremen	Szombathely, Hungary
19:00 CEST (UTC+2)	Oross 8'; G. Nagy II 41'		Almeida 76'	Stadium: Rohonci út Attendance: 2,000; Referee: Krisztián Király (Hungary); Assistant referees: J. Zoltán Kovács (Hungary), Péter Szabó (Hungary)

=== Király-kupa ===
10 July 2010 Semi-finals	Haladás (Hungary)	2–0	(Romania) Baia Mare	Szombathely, Hungary
14:00 CEST (UTC+2)	Kenesei 2x			Stadium: Király-sportlétesítmény; Attendance: 600; Referee: Tamás Bognár (Hungary)

10 July 2010 Final	Haladás (Hungary)	1–0	(Hungary) Paks	Szombathely, Hungary
17:30 CEST (UTC+2)	Kenesei			Stadium: Király-sportlétesítmény; Attendance: 600; Referee: Krisztián Király (Hungary)

=== Duna Takarék-torna ===
17 July 2010 Semi-finals	Gyirmót	1–2	Haladás	Mosonmagyaróvár
18:00 CEST (UTC+2)	L. Nagy		Sipos 2x	Stadium: Wittmann Antal park Attendance: 500; Referee: István Bálintfi

18 July 2010 Final	Haladás	1–0	Győr II	Mosonmagyaróvár
18:00 CEST (UTC+2)				Stadium: Wittmann Antal park

== Competitions ==
=== Overview ===
Competition	First match	Last match	Starting round	Final position	Record							
Competition	First match	Last match	Starting round	Final position	Pld	W	D	L	GF	GA	GD	Win %
Nemzeti Bajnokság I	7 August 2010	22 May 2011	Matchday 1	8th	30	11	8	11	42	36	+6	36.67
Magyar Kupa	21 September 2010	2 March 2011	Third round	Round of 16	4	2	0	2	8	9	−1	50.00
Ligakupa	24 July 2010	30 March 2011	Group stage	Semi-finals	8	3	4	1	9	8	+1	37.50
Total					42	16	12	14	59	53	+6	38.10

Source: Competitions

=== Nemzeti Bajnokság I ===
==== League table ====
Pos	Team	Pld	W	D	L	GF	GA	GD	Pts
6	Újpest	30	13	6	11	50	38	+12	45
7	Kaposvár	30	13	4	13	41	42	−1	43
8	Haladás	30	11	8	11	42	36	+6	41
9	Győr	30	10	11	9	40	35	+5	41
10	Honvéd	30	11	7	12	36	39	−3	40

Source: soccerway.com
Rules for classification: 1st points; 2nd overall wins; 3rd goal difference; 4th goals scored

==== Results summary ====
Overall								Home						Away					
Pld	W	D	L	GF	GA	GD	Pts	W	D	L	GF	GA	GD	W	D	L	GF	GA	GD
30	11	8	11	42	36	+6	41	9	4	2	27	10	+17	2	4	9	15	26	−11

Source: Hungarian Football Federation

==== Results by round ====
Round	1	2	3	4	5	6	7	8	9	10	11	12	13	14	15	16	17	18	19	20	21	22	23	24	25	26	27	28	29	30
Ground	A	H	A	A	H	A	H	A	H	A	H	A	H	A	H	H	A	H	H	A	H	A	H	A	H	A	H	A	H	A
Result	D	D	L	L	L	L	D	L	D	L	W	L	W	L	W	W	D	W	W	L	W	L	W	D	L	D	W	W	D	W
Position	10	10	13	16	16	16	16	16	16	16	16	16	15	15	15	15	14	14	12	13	12	13	11	13	13	13	13	10	9	8
Points	1	2	2	2	2	2	3	3	4	4	7	7	10	10	13	16	17	20	23	23	26	26	29	30	30	31	34	37	38	41

Source: Matches
A = Away; H = Home; W = Win; D = Draw; L = Loss

==== Matches ====
7 August 2010 2	Haladás	0–0	Zalaegerszeg	Szombathely
19:00 CEST (UTC+2)	Molnár (yellow card) 21'; Tóth (yellow card) 34'; Á. Simon (yellow card) 52'; Rajos (yellow card) 85'	Report	Panikvar (red card) 82'	Stadium: Rohonci út Attendance: 6,000; Referee: Álvaro García Miquel; Assistant referees: Vencel Tóth II, Tamás Péter; Fourth official: Gergely Szőts

14 August 2010 3	Kaposvár	1–0	Haladás	Kaposvár
19:00 CEST (UTC+2)	Jawad 9'; Gujić (yellow card) 22'; Pavlović (yellow card) 58'; Okuka (yellow card) 80'	Report	Iszlai (yellow card) 68'; G. Nagy II (yellow card) 85'	Stadium: Rákóczi Stadion; Attendance: 2,500; Referee: Zsolt Szabó; Assistant referees: Róbert Kispál, László Viszokai; Fourth official: Gábor Péter Kovács

20 August 2010 4	Pápa	5–1	Haladás	Pápa
19:00 CEST (UTC+2)	Rajnay (yellow card) 25'; Bárányos 32'; Marić 50', 88'; Rebryk (yellow card) 74'; Germán 81'; Gyömbér 84'	Report	Á. Simon (yellow card) 17'; Tóth 22'; Lengyel (yellow card) 34'; Rajos (yellow card) 50'; G. Nagy II (red card) 56'; Molnár (red card) 57'; Lattenstein (red card) 68'	Stadium: Perutz Stadion; Attendance: 2,300; Referee: Álvaro García Miquel; Assistant referees: Tibor Vámos, Arnold Kepe; Fourth official: Gergő Janitz

28 August 2010 5	Haladás	1–2	Paks	Szombathely
19:00 CEST (UTC+2)	Kenesei 40'	Report	Sifter (yellow card) 2', (goal) 29'; Bartha (yellow card) 12'; Heffler (yellow card) 82'; Vayer 89'; Magasföldi (yellow card) 90'	Stadium: Rohonci út Attendance: 3,500; Referee: Ádám Németh; Assistant referees: Vencel Tóth II, Tamás Péter; Fourth official: Balázs Böcskei

4 September 2010 1	Szolnok	0–0	Haladás	Szolnok
16:00 CEST (UTC+2)	Remili (yellow card) 38'; Ngalle (yellow card) 65'	Report	D. Lengyel (yellow card) 21'; Kenesei (yellow card) 85'; Á. Simon (yellow card) 87'	Stadium: Tiszaligeti Stadion; Attendance: 1,500; Referee: János Takács; Assistant referees: János Demeter, Tamás Márkus; Fourth official: Ádám Radványi
Note: The match was originally scheduled for 31 July 2010, but was postponed due to a friendly between Haladás and Werder Bremen.

18 September 2010 7	Haladás	1–1	Honvéd	Szombathely
18:00 CEST (UTC+2)	P. Tóth 28'; Kenesei (yellow card) 60'; Á. Simon (yellow card) 87'	Report	Dieng (yellow card) 52'; Cuerda (yellow card) 60'; Coira 61'	Stadium: Rohonci út Attendance: 2,500; Referee: Ferenc Bede; Assistant referees: Tibor Vámos, Tamás Péter; Fourth official: Attila Molnár

24 September 2010 8	Videoton	3–1	Haladás	Székesfehérvár
17:00 CEST (UTC+2)	Alves 12', 60'; D. Nagy (yellow card) 38'; Elek (yellow card) 51'; Gosztonyi 75'	Report	Tóth (yellow card) 30'; G. Nagy II (yellow card) 35'; Á. Simon (yellow card) 36'; Kenesei 51'	Stadium: Sóstói Stadion; Attendance: 2,875; Referee: József Berger; Assistant referees: Attila Forgács, Tibor Vígh; Fourth official: Ákos Pákolicz

2 October 2010 9	Haladás	3–3	Győr	Szombathely
17:30 CEST (UTC+2)	Sipos 13', (yellow card) 89'; Lengyel (yellow card) 21', (goal) 49'; Schimmer 70'; Kenesei (yellow card) 76'	Report	Pilibaitis 5', (yellow card) 54'; Trajković 41'; Aleksidze 47', (yellow card) 64'; Đorđević (yellow card) 71'	Stadium: Rohonci út Attendance: 2,500; Referee: Zoltán Iványi; Assistant referees: Vencel Tóth II, Balázs Farkas; Fourth official: J. Zoltán Kovács

9 October 2010 6	Kecskemét	1–0	Haladás	Kecskemét
16:30 CEST (UTC+2)	Tököli (yellow card) 4'; Némedi 79'	Report	Irhás (yellow card) 12'; Molnár (yellow card) 20'	Stadium: Széktói Stadion; Attendance: 1,700; Referee: Péter Solymosi; Assistant referees: Attila Kelemen, Róbert Horváth; Fourth official: László Varga
Note: The match was originally scheduled for 11 September 2010, but was postponed due to heavy rain having left the pitch unplayable.

15 October 2010 10	Újpest	3–1	Haladás	Budapest
19:00 CEST (UTC+2)	Mitrović (yellow card) 39'; Szokol (yellow card) 45'; Tisza 51'; Takács (yellow card) 71'; Rajczi 72'; Barczi 75'	Report	Irhás (yellow card) 11'; Lattenstein 81'; Tóth (yellow card) 89'	Stadium: Szusza Ferenc Stadion; Attendance: 3,557; Referee: Roland Veizer; Assistant referees: Péter Berettyán, Tamás Márkus; Fourth official: Ádám Radványi

23 October 2010 11	Haladás	4–0	Siófok	Szombathely
16:00 CEST (UTC+2)	Kenesei 35'; Sipos (yellow card) 44'; P. Tóth 74', (yellow card) 86'; G. Nagy II 79', 90'	Report	Fehér (yellow card) 34'; Kecskés (red card) 65'; Tusori (yellow card) 73'; Kocsis (yellow card) 83'	Stadium: Rohonci út Attendance: 3,500; Referee: Péter Solymosi; Assistant referees: Oszkár Lémon, Gábor Takács; Fourth official: Dávid Ákos

30 October 2010 12	Vasas	2–1	Haladás	Budapest
17:00 CEST (UTC+2)	Pantskhava 25'; Mileusnić (yellow card) 64'; Pavičević (yellow card) 87'; Németh 90+1'	Report	Sipos 23'; Tóth (yellow card) 35'; Kenesei (yellow card) 83'	Stadium: Illovszky Rudolf Stadion; Attendance: 2,000; Referee: Mihály Fábián; Assistant referees: Dr. Zsolt Varga, János Demeter; Fourth official: Róbert Nagy

6 November 2010 13	Haladás	2–0	MTK	Szombathely
16:00 CET (UTC+1)	Á. Simon 24'; Kenesei 45'; Oross (yellow card) 47'; Guzmics (yellow card) 86'	Report	Ladányi (yellow card) 48'; Vadnai (yellow card) 55'; Vukmir (yellow card) 65'	Stadium: Rohonci út Attendance: 3,000; Referee: István Vad; Assistant referees: Róbert Kispál, László Viszokai; Fourth official: Gergő Janitz

14 November 2010 14	Ferencváros	2–1	Haladás	Budapest
17:30 CET (UTC+1)	Heinz 40'; Maróti (yellow card) 52', (goal) 62'	Report	G. Nagy II (yellow card) 42'; Oross (yellow card) 55'; Kenesei 84', (red card) 90+3'	Stadium: Stadion Albert Flórián; Attendance: 5,000; Referee: Zsolt Szabó; Assistant referees: Péter Berettyán, Róbert Horváth; Fourth official: Krisztián Pánczél

20 November 2010 15	Haladás	3–0	Debrecen	Szombathely
15:00 CET (UTC+1)	Fodrek 3', 45', (yellow card) 70'; Á. Simon (yellow card) 34'; Tóth 72'; Oross (yellow card) 77'; Korolovszky (yellow card) 82'	Report	Kiss (yellow card) 25'; Rezes (yellow card) 41'; Komlósi (yellow card) 52'; Mijadinoski (yellow card) 65'; Malinauskas (yellow card) 71'	Stadium: Rohonci út Attendance: 2,000; Referee: Viktor Kassai; Assistant referees: Tibor Vámos, Vencel Tóth II; Fourth official: Balázs Böcskei

27 November 2010 16	Haladás	3–1	Szolnok	Szombathely
16:00 CET (UTC+1)	Irhás (yellow card) 20'; Tóth (yellow card) 32'; Á. Simon (yellow card) 48'; Oross 54'; G. Nagy II 61'; Kenesei 80'	Report	Antal (yellow card) 26'; Remili 58', (red card) 64'; Szalai (yellow card) 67'	Stadium: Rohonci út Attendance: 2,500; Referee: Gergely Sulyok; Assistant referees: Péter Berettyán, Zsolt Márton; Fourth official: Szabolcs Fenyvesi

26 February 2011 17	Zalaegerszeg	1–1	Haladás	Zalaegerszeg
16:00 CET (UTC+1)	Balázs 40'	Report	Kenesei 3'; Sipos (yellow card) 73'	Stadium: ZTE Arena; Attendance: 6,780; Referee: Sándor Andó-Szabó; Assistant referees: Balázs Farkas, Zsolt Butkai; Fourth official: J. Zoltán Kovács

5 March 2011 18	Haladás	2–0	Kaposvár	Szombathely
16:00 CET (UTC+1)	Oross 4'; Irhás 66'; Sipos (yellow card) 82'; Guzmics (yellow card) 90+2'	Report	Grúz (yellow card) 15'; Oláh (yellow card) 17'; Sass (yellow card) 65'	Stadium: Rohonci út Attendance: 4,000; Referee: Gábor Oláh; Assistant referees: Péter Berettyán, Zsolt Márton; Fourth official: Tibor Farkas

12 March 2011 19	Haladás	1–0	Pápa	Szombathely
16:00 CET (UTC+1)	Kenesei 36'; G. Nagy II (yellow card) 59'; Fodrek (yellow card) 71'; Schimmer (yellow card) 88'	Report	N. Tóth (yellow card) 55'; Dlusztus (yellow card) 69'; S. Nagy (yellow card) 83'	Stadium: Rohonci út Attendance: 5,000; Referee: István Vad; Assistant referees: Vencel Tóth II, Zoltán Kis; Fourth official: Tibor Gyarmati II

19 March 2011 20	Paks	2–1	Haladás	Paks
16:00 CET (UTC+1)	Báló (yellow card) 21'; Kiss 48'; Heffler (yellow card) 73'; Szabó (yellow card) 75'; Vayer 84'	Report	Tóth (yellow card) 16'; Halmosi 29'; Sipos (yellow card) 48'; Korolovszky (yellow card) 56'; Irhás (yellow card) 63'	Stadium: Fehérvári úti Stadion; Attendance: 600; Referee: Péter Solymosi; Assistant referees: István Albert, Attila Forgács; Fourth official: Zoltán Iványi

2 April 2011 21	Haladás	1–0	Kecskemét	Szombathely
17:00 CEST (UTC+2)	Fodrek (yellow card) 65'; Halmosi (yellow card) 74'; Tóth (yellow card) 76', (goal) 90+3'; Oross (yellow card) 80'	Report	Ebala (yellow card) 26'; Radanović (yellow card) 68'	Stadium: Rohonci út Attendance: 5,000; Referee: Roland Veizer; Assistant referees: Attila Kelemen, János Demeter; Fourth official: László Varga

9 April 2011 22	Honvéd	3–1	Haladás	Budapest
17:30 CEST (UTC+2)	Lovrić 40', 69', (yellow card) 47'; Sadjo (yellow card) 56'; Ivancsics 78'	Report	G. Nagy I (yellow card) 25'; Á. Simon (yellow card) 34'; Lengyel (yellow card) 43'; Sipos (yellow card) 72'; Halmosi 75'	Stadium: Bozsik József Stadion; Attendance: 700; Referee: István Vad; Assistant referees: György Ring, Dr. Zsolt Varga; Fourth official: Ádám Radványi

17 April 2011 23	Haladás	2–0	Videoton	Szombathely
17:30 CEST (UTC+2)	G. Nagy II (yellow card) 55'; Halmosi 78'; Kenesei 86'	Report	Elek (yellow card) 30'; Alves (yellow card) 89'	Stadium: Rohonci út Attendance: 5,000; Referee: Péter Solymosi; Assistant referees: Oszkár Lémon, Gábor Takács; Fourth official: Norbert Kiss

22 April 2011 24	Győr	2–2	Haladás	Győr
17:00 CEST (UTC+2)	Völgyi (yellow card) 40'; Aleksidze 55', 58'	Report	Tóth (yellow card) 11', (goal) 90+1'; Kenesei 81'; Rózsa (yellow card) 90+3'	Stadium: ETO Park; Attendance: 2,500; Referee: Roland Veizer; Assistant referees: Dr. Zsolt Varga, Zoltán Pápai; Fourth official: Róbert Nagy

26 April 2011 25	Haladás	0–2	Újpest	Szombathely
16:30 CEST (UTC+2)	Rózsa (yellow card) 13'; Á. Simon (yellow card) 54'; Halmosi (red card) 63'; Guzmics (yellow card) 73'; Kenesei (yellow card) 83'	Report	Szokol (yellow card) 27'; Lázár 44'; Balogh (yellow card) 58'; Balajti 73'; Pollák (yellow card) 89'	Stadium: Rohonci út Attendance: 3,000; Referee: Mihály Fábián; Assistant referees: Péter Berettyán, Tamás Márkus; Fourth official: Róbert Nagy

30 April 2011 26	Siófok	0–0	Haladás	Siófok
18:00 CEST (UTC+2)	Graszl (yellow card) 37'; Lukács (yellow card) 86'	Report	Iszlai (yellow card) 7'; Á. Simon (yellow card) 61'; Korolovszky (yellow card) 77'	Stadium: Révész Géza utcai Stadion; Attendance: 750; Referee: Ádám Németh; Assistant referees: Gábor Takács, Zsolt Márton; Fourth official: Béla Botló

7 May 2011 27	Haladás	3–0	Vasas	Szombathely
19:00 CEST (UTC+2)	Oross 31', 35', 90'; Kenesei (yellow card) 86'	Report	N. Németh (yellow card) 77'	Stadium: Rohonci út Attendance: 6,000; Referee: Péter Solymosi; Assistant referees: Balázs Farkas, Tamás Péter; Fourth official: Tibor Gyarmati II

11 May 2011 28	MTK	0–3	Haladás	Budapest
20:00 CEST (UTC+2)	Hajdú (yellow card) 6'; Ladányi (yellow card) 11'; Hrepka (red card) 58'; Sütő (red card) 68'	Report	Oross (yellow card) 4'; Kenesei (yellow card) 6', (goal) 33'; Lengyel (yellow card) 22'; Schimmer (yellow card) 24'; Fodrek 81'; Halmosi 87'	Stadium: Hidegkuti Nándor Stadion; Attendance: 1,200; Referee: István Vad; Assistant referees: Zsolt Szpisják, Zsolt Butkai; Fourth official: Gábor Fajkusz

15 May 2011 29	Haladás	1–1	Ferencváros	Szombathely
17:30 CEST (UTC+2)	Fodrek (yellow card) 24'; Iszlai 51'; G. Nagy I (red card) 77'; Rózsa (yellow card) 90'	Report	Tutorić (yellow card) 14'; Stanić (yellow card) 31'; Rósa 61'; Heinz (red card) 90'	Stadium: Rohonci út Attendance: 6,000; Referee: Sándor Andó-Szabó; Assistant referees: Péter Berettyán, Gábor Takács; Fourth official: Tibor Farkas

22 May 2011 30	Debrecen	1–2	Haladás	Debrecen
17:30 CEST (UTC+2)	Coulibaly 26'; Szakály (yellow card) 32'; Illés (yellow card) 49'; Ramos (yellow card) 65'	Report	Iszlai (yellow card) 27'; Sipos 57'; Lengyel (yellow card) 59'; Halmosi 67'; Oross (yellow card) 87'	Stadium: Oláh Gábor utcai Stadion; Attendance: 5,000; Referee: Józzef Berger; Assistant referees: Zsolt Szpisják, Attila Forgács; Fourth official: László Lovas

=== Magyar Kupa ===
21 September 2010 Third round	Győrszemere	1–2	Haladás	Győrszemere
15:30 CEST (UTC+2)	Sági 55'; Regner (yellow card) 73'; Török (yellow card) 75'; Barabás (yellow card) 88'	Report	A. Simon 17'; Devecseri (yellow card) 29'; Iszlai (yellow card) 44'; Rácz 77', (yellow card) 77'	Stadium: Győrszemerei Sportpálya; Attendance: 150; Referee: Dániel Becséri; Assistant referees: Gergely Becséri, László Szücs

27 October 2010 Round of 32	Lipót	2–5	Haladás	Lipót
14:30 CEST (UTC+2)	Tóth 3' (o.g.); Lappints 9'; Lakatos (yellow card) 33'	Report	Sipos (yellow card) 39'; G. Nagy II 40'; Kenesei 55', 58'; Tóth 70'; Oross 76'	Stadium: Lipóti Sportpálya; Attendance: 300; Referee: Gábor Barna; Assistant referees: Balázs Kiss, Tamás Kulman

==== Round of 16 ====
9 November 2010 First leg	Videoton	3–0	Haladás	Székesfehérvár
18:00 CET (UTC+1)	Djordjic (yellow card) 12'; Alves 60'; Vasiljević 72'; Elek 83'	Report	Oross (yellow card) 33'; G. Nagy II (yellow card) 45'; Irhás (yellow card) 64'; Guzmics (yellow card) 66'	Stadium: Sóstói Stadion; Attendance: 1,040; Referee: Zoltán Iványi; Assistant referees: István Albert, János Medovarszki

2 March 2011 Second leg	Haladás	1–3 (1–6 agg.)	Videoton	Szombathely
16:00 CET (UTC+1)	Devecseri (yellow card) 41'; Gyurján 44'; Jagodics (yellow card) 51'	Report	Nikolić 37'; Vasiljević 52', (yellow card) 62'; Lencse 69'	Stadium: Rohonci út Attendance: 150; Referee: Balázs Böcskei; Assistant referees: Tamás Péter, Roland Hofbauer
Note: Videoton won 6–1 on aggregate.

=== Ligakupa ===
==== Group stage ====
Pos	Team	Pld	W	D	L	GF	GA	GD	Pts	Qualification	SZO	FTC	LOP
1	Haladás	4	2	2	0	6	4	+2	8	Advance to knockout phase	—	1–1	2–1
2	Ferencváros	4	1	3	0	5	3	+2	6		0–0	—	4–2
3	Pápa	4	0	1	3	5	9	−4	1		2–3	0–0	—

24 July 2010 1	Haladás	2–1	Pápa	Szombathely
19:00 CEST (UTC+2)	G. Nagy II (yellow card) 26'; P. Tóth 38'; Lengyel (yellow card) 43'; Sipos 59'; A. Simon (yellow card) 77'	Report	Abwo 31'; Venczel (yellow card) 35'; Heffler (yellow card) 82'	Stadium: Rohonci út Attendance: 1,000; Referee: Ádám Németh; Assistant referees: Zsolt Márton, Dániel Szalai

3 November 2010 2	Ferencváros	0–0	Haladás	Budapest
18:00 CET (UTC+1)	Jakimovski (yellow card) 14'; Vattai (yellow card) 27'	Report	Lengyel (yellow card) 50'; Tóth (yellow card) 58'; Devecseri (yellow card) 90'	Stadium: Stadion Albert Flórián; Attendance: 250; Referee: Ádám Radványi; Assistant referees: Tamás Márkus, Zoltán Pápai

1 December 2010 4	Pápa	2–3	Haladás	Pápa
13:00 CET (UTC+1)	Bali 4'; G. Tóth 42'; Bíró (yellow card) 66'; Venczel (yellow card) 87'	Report	Rácz 9'; Lattenstein 44'; A. Simon 65'	Stadium: Perutz Stadion; Attendance: 50; Referee: J. Zoltán Kovács; Assistant referees: Dániel Szalai, Roland Hofbauer

16 February 2011 3	Haladás	1–1	Ferencváros	Szombathely
12:45 CET (UTC+1)	Sipos 43'; Á. Simon (yellow card) 58'	Report	Papp (yellow card) 43'; Pölöskei 90+3'	Stadium: Illés Akadémia Sporttelep; Attendance: 0 Referee: Szabolcs Szilasi; Assistant referees: Gábor Takács, Gábor Gyürüsi
Note: The match was originally scheduled for 24 November 2010, but was postponed due to the pitch's unplayable condition.

==== Knockout phase ====
===== Quarter-finals =====
19 February 2011 First leg	Győr	1–2	Haladás	Győr
15:00 CET (UTC+1)	Pilibaitis 32'; Völgyi (yellow card) 61'; Trajković (yellow card) 62'; Koltai (yellow card) 68'	Report	Guzmics (yellow card) 18'; Kenesei 20'; Fodrek (yellow card) 36'; Halmosi (yellow card) 58'; Tóth 66', (yellow card) 81'	Stadium: ETO Park; Attendance: 600; Referee: Ádám Németh; Assistant referees: Zsolt Butkai, Dániel Szalai

22 February 2011 Second leg	Haladás	1–1 (3–2 agg.)	Győr	Szombathely
14:30 CET (UTC+1)	Gyurján 50'; Rajos (yellow card) 79'; Ugrai (red card) 90'	Report	Ji-Paraná 39'; Windecker (yellow card) 40'; Völgyi (yellow card) 54'; Molnár (yellow card) 83'	Stadium: Illés Akadémia Sporttelep; Attendance: 200; Referee: J. Zoltán Kovács; Assistant referees: Oszkár Lémon, Milán Mohos
Note: Haladás won 3–2 on aggregate.

===== Semi-finals =====
27 March 2011 First leg	Haladás	0–2	Debrecen	Szombathely
17:30 CET (UTC+1)	G. Nagy I (yellow card) 44'; Tóth (yellow card) 61'; Csontos (yellow card) 84'	Report	Mbengono (yellow card) 8'; Coulibaly 45', 62'; Ramos (yellow card) 71'; Fodor (yellow card) 85'	Stadium: Rohonci út Attendance: 800; Referee: Szabolcs Szilasi; Assistant referees: Oszkár Lémon, Gábor Takács

30 March 2011 Second leg	Debrecen	0–0 (2–0 agg.)	Haladás	Debrecen
16:30 CET (UTC+1)	Spitzmüller (yellow card) 47'	Report		Stadium: Oláh Gábor utcai Stadion; Attendance: 2,000; Referee: J. Zoltán Kovács; Assistant referees: István Tóth, Dániel Szalai
Note: Debrecen won 2–0 on aggregate.

== Statistics ==
=== Overall ===
Appearances (Apps) numbers are for appearances in competitive games only, including sub appearances.
Source: Competitions

No.	Player	Pos.	Nemzeti Bajnokság I				Magyar Kupa				Ligakupa				Total			
No.	Player	Pos.	Apps	Goal	Booked	Sent off (straight red)	Apps	Goal	Booked	Sent off (straight red)	Apps	Goal	Booked	Sent off (straight red)	Apps	Goal	Booked	Sent off (straight red)
1	(Hungary) Tamás Szép	GK									1				1			
1	(Hungary) Dániel Totka	GK																
2	(Hungary) Zoltán Csontos	MF	6				3				6		1		15		1	
3	(Hungary) Gábor Nagy I	DF	9		1	1					2		1		11		2	1
4	(Hungary) Gábor Rajos	MF	15		2		1				6			1	22		2	1
5	(Hungary) Gábor Korolovszky	MF	20		3		3				4				27		3	
6	(Hungary) Dániel Lengyel	DF	13	1	6		1				5		2		19	1	8	
7	(Hungary) Balázs Molnár	MF	12		2	1	1				3				16		2	1
8	(Hungary) Gábor Nagy II	MF	26	3	5	1	2	1	1		5		1		33	4	7	1
9	(Hungary) Márton Oross	FW	25	5	6		3	1	1		5				33	6	7	
10	(Hungary) István Kovács	MF	1				1				1				3			
11	(Hungary) Ignác Irhás	MF	21	1	4		3		1		4				28	1	5	
12	(Hungary) Szilárd Devecseri	DF	2				2		2		4		1		8		3	
13	(Romania) Andrei Enescu	MF									1				1			
13	(Hungary) Péter Halmosi	MF	12	5	1	1					2		1		14	5	2	1
13	(Serbia) Nemanja Obrić	MF	3				2				1				6			
14	(Hungary) Roland Ugrai	FW	4				1				3		1		8		1	
15	(Hungary) Péter Tóth	DF	28	6	9		2	1			5	2	3		35	9	12	
16	(Hungary) Máté Skriba	FW									1				1			
17	(Hungary) Attila Simon	FW	5				1	1			4	1	1		10	2	1	
18	(Hungary) Norbert Sipos	MF	23	3	6		3		1		5	2			31	5	7	
19	(Hungary) Richárd Czafit	FW									1				1			
19	(Hungary) Bence Gyurján	MF	1				1	1			3	1			5	2		
20	(Hungary) Krisztián Kenesei	FW	23	11	7	1	2	2			3	1			28	14	7	1
21	(Hungary) Zoltán Nagy	DF					1				1				2			
21	(Hungary) Attila Szakály	MF					1				3				4			
22	(Hungary) Richárd Guzmics	DF	28		3		2		1		2		1		32		5	
23	(Hungary) Szabolcs Schimmer	MF	26	1	2		2				2				30	1	2	
25	(Slovakia) Branislav Fodrek	MF	20	3	4		2				4		1		26	3	5	
26	(Hungary) Máté Hanzl	DF									1				1			
26	(Hungary) Márk Jagodics	MF	1				2		1		2				5		1	
27	(Hungary) Szabolcs Szvoboda	DF									3				3			
29	(Slovakia) Marián Sluka	MF	8								1				9			
30	(Hungary) Dávid Dombó	GK																
32	(Hungary) Bálint Nagy	MF									1				1			
32	(Hungary) Ferenc Rácz	FW	4				2	1	1		2	1			8	2	1	
32	(Hungary) Tamás Szeles	MF																
33	(Hungary) Márk Farkas	DF	1				1				1				3			
37	(Hungary) Dániel Bezdi	DF					1								1			
37	(Hungary) Milán Kalász	MF																
37	(Hungary) Levente László																	
37	(Hungary) Csaba Lenkó	FW																
46	(Hungary) Ádám Simon	MF	27	1	10		2				3		1		32	1	11	
66	(Hungary) Dániel Rózsa	GK	30		3		3				4				37		3	
84	(Hungary) Norbert Lattenstein	MF	9	1		1	2				8	1			19	2		1
90	(Hungary) Bence Iszlai	DF	7	1	3		1		1		4				12	1	4	
90	(Hungary) András Radó	MF	1				1				1				3			
91	(Hungary) Roland Mursits	GK					1				4				5			
Own goals																		
Totals				42	77	6		8	10			9	15	1		59	102	7

=== Hat-tricks ===
No.	Player	Against	Result	Date	Competition
9	(Hungary) Márton Oross	Vasas	3–0	7 May 2011	Nemzeti Bajnokság I

=== Clean sheets ===
			Clean sheets			
No.	Player	Games Played	Nemzeti Bajnokság I	Magyar Kupa	Ligakupa	Total
66	(Hungary) Dániel Rózsa	37	12			12
91	(Hungary) Roland Mursits	5			2	2
1	(Hungary) Tamás Szép	1			1	1
1	(Hungary) Dániel Totka	0				0
30	(Hungary) Dávid Dombó	0				0
Totals			12		3	15
