= 2011–12 Szombathelyi Haladás season =

Szombathelyi Haladás
2011–12 season
- Chairman: (Hungary) Béla Illés
- Manager: (Hungary) Zoltán Aczél (until 14 December 2011) (Hungary) Tamás Artner
- NB 1: 8.
- Hungarian Cup: Round of 16
- Hungarian League Cup: Group Stage
- Top goalscorer: League: (Hungary) Krisztián Kenesei (7); All: (Hungary) Krisztián Kenesei (10)
- Highest home attendance: 8,000 v FTC (25 March 2012)
- Lowest home attendance: 500 v ZTE (31 August 2011); 500 v Pápa (5 October 2011); 500 v Győr (9 November 2011)
Home colours	Away colours

The 2011–12 season will be Szombathelyi Haladás's 56th competitive season, 4th consecutive season in the OTP Bank Liga and 92nd year in existence as a football club.

== First team squad ==
Note: Flags indicate national team as defined under FIFA eligibility rules; some limited exceptions apply. Players may hold more than one non-FIFA nationality.

No.	Pos.	Nation	Player
2	MF	HUN	Zoltán Búrány
4	MF	HUN	Gábor Rajos
5	DF	HUN	Gábor Korolovszky
6	MF	HUN	Attila Szakály
7	MF	HUN	András Horváth
8	MF	HUN	Gábor Nagy
9	FW	HUN	Márton Oross
10	MF	HUN	Kornél Kulcsár
12	DF	HUN	Szilárd Devecseri
13	MF	HUN	Péter Halmosi
14	FW	HUN	Roland Ugrai
15	DF	HUN	Péter Tóth
16	FW	HUN	Máté Skriba
18	MF	HUN	Norbert Sipos

No.	Pos.	Nation	Player
19	MF	HUN	Bence Gyurján
20	FW	HUN	Krisztián Kenesei
21	MF	HUN	Dániel Nagy (on loan from Videoton)
22	DF	HUN	Richárd Guzmics
23	DF	HUN	Szabolcs Schimmer
24	FW	MNE	Goran Vujović (on loan from Videoton)
26	DF	HUN	Márk Jagodics
29	MF	SVK	Marián Sluka
30	GK	HUN	Gergő Gőcze
32	FW	HUN	András Radó
66	GK	HUN	Dániel Rózsa
90	MF	HUN	Bence Iszlai
91	GK	HUN	Roland Mursits

== Transfers ==
=== Summer ===
In: Note: Flags indicate national team as defined under FIFA eligibility rules; some limited exceptions apply. Players may hold more than one non-FIFA nationality.

No.	Pos.	Nation	Player
2	MF	HUN	Zoltán Búrány (from Szolnoki MÁV FC)
7	MF	HUN	András Horváth (from Zalaegerszegi TE)
8	MF	HUN	Gábor Nagy (from MTK Budapest FC)
24	FW	MNE	Goran Vujović (loan from Videoton FC)
30	GK	HUN	Gergő Gőcze (loan return from Kozármisleny SE)

Out: Note: Flags indicate national team as defined under FIFA eligibility rules; some limited exceptions apply. Players may hold more than one non-FIFA nationality.

No.	Pos.	Nation	Player
2	DF	HUN	Zoltán Csontos (to Soproni VSE)
6	MF	HUN	Dániel Lengyel (to BFC Siófok)
7	MF	HUN	Balázs Molnár (to Zalaegerszegi TE)
11	MF	HUN	Ignác Irhás (loan to Mezőkövesd-Zsóry SE)
25	FW	SVK	Branislav Fodrek (to (Slovakia) FK DAC 1904 Dunajská Streda)
32	FW	HUN	Ferenc Rácz (to Kozármisleny SE)
46	MF	HUN	Ádám Simon (to (Italy) U.S. Città di Palermo)
84	MF	HUN	Norbert Lattenstein (to BFC Siófok)
––	GK	HUN	Dániel Totka (to BKV Előre SC)

=== Winter ===
In: Note: Flags indicate national team as defined under FIFA eligibility rules; some limited exceptions apply. Players may hold more than one non-FIFA nationality.

No.	Pos.	Nation	Player
10	MF	HUN	Kornél Kulcsár (from Kaposvári Rákóczi FC)
21	MF	HUN	Dániel Nagy (on loan from Videoton FC)

Out: Note: Flags indicate national team as defined under FIFA eligibility rules; some limited exceptions apply. Players may hold more than one non-FIFA nationality.

No.	Pos.	Nation	Player
3	DF	HUN	Gábor Nagy (to Gyirmót SE)
10	MF	HUN	István Kovács (to Videoton FC)
14	DF	HUN	Szabolcs Szvodoba (on loan to Budaörsi SC)
17	FW	HUN	Attila Simon (loan to Ceglédi VSE)

- List of Hungarian football transfer summer 2011
- List of Hungarian football transfers winter 2011–12

== Statistics ==
=== Appearances and goals ===
Last updated on 27 May 2012.

No.	Pos	Nat	Player	Total		OTP Bank Liga		Hungarian Cup		League Cup	
No.	Pos	Nat	Player	Apps	Goals	Apps	Goals	Apps	Goals	Apps	Goals
2	MF	(Hungary) HUN	Zoltán Búrány	27	0	21	0	3	0	3	0
4	MF	(Hungary) HUN	Gábor Rajos	26	0	21	0	3	0	2	0
5	DF	(Hungary) HUN	Gábor Korolovszky	22	0	21	0	1	0	0	0
6	MF	(Hungary) HUN	Attila Szakály	7	0	2	0	0	0	5	0
7	MF	(Hungary) HUN	András Horváth	14	0	11	0	2	0	1	0
8	MF	(Hungary) HUN	Gábor Nagy	22	3	20	3	2	0	0	0
9	FW	(Hungary) HUN	Márton Oross	28	2	22	2	4	0	2	0
10	MF	(Hungary) HUN	Kornél Kulcsár	8	1	8	1	0	0	0	0
12	DF	(Hungary) HUN	Szilárd Devecseri	7	0	2	0	1	0	4	0
13	MF	(Hungary) HUN	Péter Halmosi	30	5	27	5	2	0	1	0
14	FW	(Hungary) HUN	Roland Ugrai	15	3	9	1	1	0	5	2
15	DF	(Hungary) HUN	Péter Tóth	31	2	26	2	4	0	1	0
16	FW	(Hungary) HUN	Máté Skriba	10	2	4	0	2	0	4	2
18	MF	(Hungary) HUN	Norbert Sipos	15	1	8	0	3	1	4	0
19	MF	(Hungary) HUN	Bence Gyurján	3	0	1	0	0	0	2	0
20	FW	(Hungary) HUN	Krisztián Kenesei	22	10	19	7	3	3	0	0
21	MF	(Hungary) HUN	Dániel Nagy	11	2	11	2	0	0	0	0
22	DF	(Hungary) HUN	Richárd Guzmics	31	0	27	0	2	0	2	0
23	DF	(Hungary) HUN	Szabolcs Schimmer	31	1	25	1	4	0	2	0
24	FW	(Montenegro) MNE	Goran Vujović	17	7	13	6	1	0	3	1
26	DF	(Hungary) HUN	Márk Jagodics	5	0	1	0	0	0	4	0
29	MF	(Slovakia) SVK	Marián Sluka	21	1	16	1	3	0	2	0
30	GK	(Hungary) HUN	Gergő Gőcze	7	-4	2	-1	2	0	3	-3
32	FW	(Hungary) HUN	András Radó	16	2	12	2	1	0	3	0
66	GK	(Hungary) HUN	Dániel Rózsa	28	-36	26	-35	2	-1	0	0
90	MF	(Hungary) HUN	Bence Iszlai	27	1	25	1	2	0	0	0
91	GK	(Hungary) HUN	Roland Mursits	4	-7	1	-1	0	0	3	-6
Youth players
4	MF	(Hungary) HUN	Máté Baranyai	1	0	0	0	0	0	1	0
11	MF	(Hungary) HUN	Benjámin Gugcsó	2	0	0	0	0	0	2	0
12	MF	(Hungary) HUN	Tamás Szeles	1	0	0	0	0	0	1	0
15	FW	(Hungary) HUN	Attila Tóth	1	0	0	0	0	0	1	0
16	FW	(Hungary) HUN	Erik Németh	1	0	0	0	0	0	1	0
19	MF	(Hungary) HUN	Máté Hanzl	2	0	0	0	0	0	2	0
21	FW	(Hungary) HUN	Richárd Czafit	2	1	0	0	0	0	2	1
21	DF	(Hungary) HUN	Bálint Nagy	2	0	0	0	0	0	2	0
32	FW	(Hungary) HUN	Detre Horváth	4	0	0	0	0	0	4	0
33	DF	(Hungary) HUN	Márk Farkas	5	0	0	0	0	0	5	0
37	FW	(Hungary) HUN	Milán Kalász	3	0	0	0	0	0	3	0
––	DF	(Hungary) HUN	Krisztián Tar	1	0	0	0	0	0	1	0
Players currently out on loan
11	MF	(Hungary) HUN	Ignác Irhás	7	0	6	0	0	0	1	0
14	DF	(Hungary) HUN	Szabolcs Szvoboda	1	0	0	0	0	0	1	0
17	FW	(Hungary) HUN	Attila Simon	12	1	5	0	2	0	5	1
Players no longer at the club:
3	DF	(Hungary) HUN	Gábor Nagy	13	1	7	1	4	0	2	0
7	MF	(Hungary) HUN	Balázs Molnár	2	0	2	0	0	0	0	0
10	MF	(Hungary) HUN	István Kovács	18	2	15	2	2	0	1	0

=== Top scorers ===
Includes all competitive matches. The list is sorted by shirt number when total goals are equal.

Last updated on 27 May 2012

Position	Nation	Number	Name	OTP Bank Liga	Hungarian Cup	League Cup	Total
1	(Hungary)	20	Krisztián Kenesei	7	3	0	10
2	(Montenegro)	24	Goran Vujović	6	0	1	7
3	(Hungary)	13	Péter Halmosi	5	0	0	5
4	(Hungary)	8	Gábor Nagy	3	0	0	3
5	(Hungary)	14	Roland Ugrai	1	0	2	3
6	(Hungary)	10	István Kovács	2	0	0	2
7	(Hungary)	15	Péter Tóth	2	0	0	2
8	(Hungary)	9	Márton Oross	2	0	0	2
9	(Hungary)	32	András Radó	2	0	0	2
10	(Hungary)	21	Dániel Nagy	2	0	0	2
11	(Hungary)	16	Máté Skriba	0	0	2	2
12	(Hungary)	23	Szabolcs Schimmer	1	0	0	1
13	(Slovakia)	29	Marián Sluka	1	0	0	1
14	(Hungary)	3	Gábor Nagy	1	0	0	1
15	(Hungary)	90	Bence Iszlai	1	0	0	1
16	(Hungary)	10	Kornél Kulcsár	1	0	0	1
17	(Hungary)	18	Norbert Sipos	0	1	0	1
18	(Hungary)	17	Attila Simon	0	0	1	1
19	(Hungary)	7	Richárd Czafit	0	0	1	1
/	/	/	Own Goals	2	0	0	2
			TOTALS	39	4	7	50

=== Disciplinary record ===
Includes all competitive matches. Players with 1 card or more included only.

Last updated on 27 May 2012

Position	Nation	Number	Name	OTP Bank Liga		Hungarian Cup		League Cup		Total (Hu Total)	
Position	Nation	Number	Name	Booked	Sent off (straight red)	Booked	Sent off (straight red)	Booked	Sent off (straight red)	Booked	Sent off (straight red)
MF	(Hungary) (Serbia)	2	Zoltán Búrány	1	0	0	0	1	0	2 (1)	0 (0)
DF	(Hungary)	3	Gábor Nagy	1	0	0	0	0	0	1 (1)	0 (0)
MF	(Hungary)	4	Gábor Rajos	3	1	0	0	1	0	4 (3)	1 (1)
DF	(Hungary)	5	Gábor Korolovszky	3	0	0	0	0	0	3 (3)	0 (0)
MF	(Hungary)	6	Attila Szakály	0	0	0	0	1	0	1 (0)	0 (0)
MF	(Hungary)	7	András Horváth	1	0	0	0	0	0	1 (1)	0 (0)
MF	(Hungary)	8	Gábor Nagy	4	0	0	0	0	0	4 (4)	0 (0)
FW	(Hungary)	9	Márton Oross	4	0	2	0	0	0	6 (4)	0 (0)
MF	(Hungary)	10	Kornél Kulcsár	2	0	0	0	0	0	2 (2)	0 (0)
MF	(Hungary)	10	István Kovács	4	0	0	0	0	0	4 (4)	0 (0)
MF	(Hungary)	11	Ignác Irhás	2	0	0	0	0	0	2 (2)	0 (0)
DF	(Hungary)	12	Szilárd Devecseri	1	0	0	0	0	0	1 (1)	0 (0)
MF	(Hungary)	13	Péter Halmosi	9	1	0	0	1	0	10 (9)	1 (1)
DF	(Hungary)	14	Roland Ugrai	0	0	1	0	1	0	2 (0)	0 (0)
DF	(Hungary)	15	Péter Tóth	7	2	0	0	0	0	7 (7)	2 (2)
FW	(Hungary)	16	Máté Skriba	2	0	0	0	0	0	2 (2)	0 (0)
MF	(Hungary)	18	Norbert Sipos	1	0	0	0	2	0	3 (1)	0 (0)
MF	(Hungary)	19	Máté Hanzl	0	0	0	0	1	0	1 (0)	0 (0)
FW	(Hungary)	20	Krisztián Kenesei	2	0	1	0	0	0	3 (2)	0 (0)
MF	(Hungary)	21	Dániel Nagy	3	0	0	0	0	0	3 (3)	0 (0)
DF	(Hungary)	21	Bálint Nagy	0	0	0	0	1	0	1 (0)	0 (0)
DF	(Hungary)	22	Richárd Guzmics	8	1	0	1	0	0	8 (8)	2 (1)
DF	(Hungary)	23	Szabolcs Schimmer	1	0	1	0	0	0	2 (1)	0 (0)
FW	(Montenegro)	24	Goran Vujović	3	1	0	0	1	0	4 (3)	1 (1)
DF	(Hungary)	26	Márk Jagodics	1	0	0	0	2	0	3 (1)	0 (0)
MF	(Slovakia)	29	Marián Sluka	0	1	1	0	0	0	1 (0)	1 (1)
FW	(Hungary)	32	András Radó	2	1	0	0	0	0	2 (2)	1 (1)
FW	(Hungary)	32	Detre Horváth	0	0	0	0	2	0	2 (0)	0 (0)
DF	(Hungary)	33	Márk Farkas	0	0	0	0	3	0	3 (0)	0 (0)
FW	(Hungary)	37	Milán Kalász	0	0	0	0	1	0	1 (0)	0 (0)
GK	(Hungary)	66	Dániel Rózsa	3	0	0	0	0	0	3 (3)	0 (0)
MF	(Hungary)	90	Bence Iszlai	9	1	0	0	0	0	9 (9)	1 (1)
			TOTALS	77	9	6	1	18	0	101 (77)	10 (9)

=== Overall ===
Games played	40 (30 OTP Bank Liga, 4 Hungarian Cup and 6 Hungarian League Cup)
Games won	13 (9 OTP Bank Liga, 2 Hungarian Cup and 2 Hungarian League Cup)
Games drawn	13 (11 OTP Bank Liga, 1 Hungarian Cup and 1 Hungarian League Cup)
Games lost	14 (10 OTP Bank Liga, 1 Hungarian Cup and 3 Hungarian League Cup)
Goals scored	50
Goals conceded	47
Goal difference	+3
Yellow cards	101
Red cards	10
Worst discipline	(Hungary) Péter Halmosi (10 (yellow card) , 1 (red card) )
Worst discipline	(Hungary) Richárd Guzmics (8 (yellow card) , 2 (red card) )
Best result	5–0 (H) v Paksi SE - OTP Bank Liga - 05-05-2012
Worst result	1–4 (A) v Újpest FC - OTP Bank Liga - 24-09-2011
Worst result	0–3 (A) v Zalaegerszegi TE - League Cup - 16-11-2011
Most appearances	(Hungary) Péter Tóth (31 appearances)
Most appearances	(Hungary) Richárd Guzmics (31 appearances)
Most appearances	(Hungary) Szabolcs Schimmer (31 appearances)
Top scorer	(Hungary) Krisztián Kenesei (10 goal)
Points	52/120 (43.33%)

Last updated: 27 May 2012

== Nemzeti Bajnokság I ==
=== Matches ===
16 July 2011 1	Pécsi Mecsek FC	1–0	Szombathelyi Haladás	Pécs, Baranya County
19:00 CET (UTC+01)	Horváth 80'	(Report)		Stadium: Stadion PMFC; Attendance: 2,500; Referee: (Hungary) Ádám Németh

23 July 2011 2	Szombathelyi Haladás	2–4	Budapest Honvéd FC	Szombathely, Vas County
19:00 CET (UTC+01)	Tóth 23'; Kenesei 51' (pen.)	(Report)	Danilo 16' (pen.) 36' (pen.); Novák 64'; Lovrić 71'	Stadium: Rohonci Street Stadium; Attendance: 3,000; Referee: (Hungary) Szabolcs Szilasi

29 July 2011 3	Győri ETO FC	1–0	Szombathelyi Haladás	Győr, Győr-Moson-Sopron County
19:00 CET (UTC+01)	Dudás 5'	(Report)		Stadium: ETO Park; Attendance: 7,000; Referee: (Hungary) Viktor Kassai

6 August 2011 4	Vasas SC	0–0	Szombathelyi Haladás	Budapest, Pest County
17:30 CET (UTC+01)		(Report)		Stadium: Stadion Rudolf Illovszky; Attendance: 500; Referee: (Hungary) Zsolt Szabó

13 August 2011 5	Szombathelyi Haladás	1–0	Zalaegerszegi TE	Szombathely, Vas County
19:00 CET (UTC+01)	Kenesei 70'	(Report)		Stadium: Rohonci Street Stadium; Attendance: 7,000; Referee: (Hungary) Péter Solymosi

21 August 2011 6	Ferencvárosi TC	1–2	Szombathelyi Haladás	Budapest, Pest County
18:00 CET (UTC+01)	Rósa 72' (pen.)	(Report)	Vujović 5'; Halmosi 56'	Stadium: Stadion Albert Flórián; Attendance: 3,500; Referee: (Hungary) Zoltán Iványi

28 August 2011 7	Szombathelyi Haladás	2–2	Kecskeméti TE	Szombathely, Vas County
18:00 CET (UTC+01)	Vujović 19'; Balogh 73' (o.g.)	(Report)	Bertus 21'; Mohl 78'	Stadium: Rohonci Street Stadium; Attendance: 5,500; Referee: (Hungary) István Vad

10 September 2011 8	Videoton FC	1–0	Szombathelyi Haladás	Székesfehérvár, Fejér County
17:30 CET (UTC+01)	Vaskó 90'	(Report)		Stadium: Sóstói Stadion; Attendance: 3,447; Referee: (Hungary) Mihály Fábián

17 September 2011 9	Szombathelyi Haladás	2–1	Lombard-Pápa TFC	Szombathely, Vas County
19:00 CET (UTC+01)	Kovács 87'; Kenesei 90+2'	(Report)	Ferenczi 53'	Stadium: Rohonci Street Stadium; Attendance: 6,000; Referee: (Hungary) József Berger

24 September 2011 10	Újpest FC	4–1	Szombathelyi Haladás	Budapest, Pest County
17:30 CET (UTC+01)	Rajczi 34' (pen.) 37'; Balogh 52' 90+2'	(Report)	Schimmer 56'	Stadium: Szusza Ferenc Stadium; Attendance: 3,700; Referee: (Hungary) Roland Veizer

1 October 2011 11	Szombathelyi Haladás	2–1	BFC Siófok	Szombathely, Vas County
18:00 CET (UTC+01)	Kovács 5'; Sluka 14'	(Report)	Lattenstein 71'	Stadium: Rohonci Street Stadium; Attendance: 5,000; Referee: (Hungary) Balázs Berke

15 October 2011 12	Paksi SE	3–2	Szombathelyi Haladás	Paks, Tolna County
18:00 CET (UTC+01)	Hrepka 35'; Böde 53'; Sifter 55'	(Report)	Vujović 47'; Nagy 68'	Stadium: Stadion PSE; Attendance: 1,560; Referee: (Hungary) Ádám Radványi

22 October 2011 13	Szombathelyi Haladás	1–1	Kaposvári Rákóczi FC	Szombathely, Vas County
17:00 CET (UTC+01)	Vujović 45'	(Report)	Perić 83'	Stadium: Rohonci Street Stadium; Attendance: 5,000; Referee: (Hungary) József Berger

28 October 2011 14	Diósgyőri VTK	1–0	Szombathelyi Haladás	Miskolc, Borsod-Abaúj-Zemplén County
18:00 CET (UTC+01)	Luque 43'	(Report)		Stadium: DVTK Stadion; Attendance: 9,000; Referee: (Hungary) Balázs Böcskei

5 November 2011 15	Szombathelyi Haladás	0–1	Debreceni VSC	Szombathely, Vas County
17:30 CET (UTC+01)		(Report)	Rezes 20'	Stadium: Rohonci Street Stadium; Attendance: 4,500; Referee: (Hungary) Zsolt Szabó

19 November 2011 16	Szombathelyi Haladás	0–0	Pécsi Mecsek FC	Szombathely, Vas County
16:00 CET (UTC+01)		(Report)		Stadium: Rohonci Street Stadium; Attendance: 2,500; Referee: (Hungary) Viktor Kassai

25 November 2011 17	Budapest Honvéd FC	2–2	Szombathelyi Haladás	Budapest, Pest County
18:00 CET (UTC+01)	Danilo 1'; Tchami 36'	(Report)	Vujović 46'; Tóth 90'	Stadium: Bozsik Stadion; Attendance: 3,000; Referee: (Hungary) Roland Veizer

4 March 2012 18	Szombathelyi Haladás	1–1	Győri ETO FC	Szombathely, Vas County
18:00 CET (UTC+01)	Fehér 48' (o.g.)	(Report)	Ahjupera 12'	Stadium: Rohonci Street Stadium; Attendance: 6,000; Referee: (Hungary) Sándor Andó-Szabó

10 March 2012 19	Szombathelyi Haladás	3–0	Vasas SC	Szombathely, Vas County
16:00 CET (UTC+01)	Nagy 19'; Vujović 26' (pen.); Oross 77'	(Report)		Stadium: Rohonci Street Stadium; Attendance: 5,000; Referee: (Hungary) Balázs Berke

17 March 2012 20	Zalaegerszegi TE	1–1	Szombathelyi Haladás	Zalaegerszeg, Zala County
17:30 CET (UTC+01)	Balázs 35'	(Report)	Halmosi 13'	Stadium: ZTE Arena; Attendance: 6,082; Referee: (Hungary) István Vad

25 March 2012 21	Szombathelyi Haladás	2–1	Ferencvárosi TC	Szombathely, Vas County
18:00 CET (UTC+01)	Kenesei 86' (pen.) 90+2'	(Report)	Kulcsár 56'	Stadium: Rohonci Street Stadium; Attendance: 8,000; Referee: (Hungary) Viktor Kassai

31 March 2012 22	Kecskeméti TE	2–2	Szombathelyi Haladás	Kecskemét, Bács-Kiskun County
16:00 CET (UTC+01)	Lencse 26' (pen.); Tököli 75'	(Report)	Kenesei 35'; Nagy 72'	Stadium: Széktói Stadion; Attendance: 3,000; Referee: (Hungary) Roland Veizer

7 April 2012 23	Szombathelyi Haladás	2–2	Videoton FC	Szombathely, Vas County
18:00 CET (UTC+01)	Radó 65'; Halmosi 79'	(Report)	Oliveira 40'; Sándor 59' (pen.)	Stadium: Rohonci Street Stadium; Attendance: 5,000; Referee: (Hungary) Ádám Németh

14 April 2012 24	Lombard-Pápa TFC	1–0	Szombathelyi Haladás	Pápa, Veszprém County
18:00 CET (UTC+01)	Seye 88'	(Report)		Stadium: Stadion Várkerti; Attendance: 2,000; Referee: (Hungary) János Takács

21 April 2012 25	Szombathelyi Haladás	1–1	Újpest FC	Szombathely, Vas County
18:00 CET (UTC+01)	Kenesei 13'	(Report)	Balogh 80'	Stadium: Rohonci Street Stadium; Attendance: 6,000; Referee: (Hungary) Szabolcs Szilasi

28 April 2012 26	BFC Siófok	0–2	Szombathelyi Haladás	Siófok, Somogy County
18:00 CET (UTC+01)		(Report)	Halmosi 52'; Oross 83'	Stadium: Révész Street Stadium; Attendance: 500; Referee: (Hungary) Balázs Böcskei

5 May 2012 27	Szombathelyi Haladás	5–0	Paksi SE	Szombathely, Vas County
17:00 CET (UTC+01)	Radó 4'; Nagy 9'; Iszlai 27' (pen.); Ugrai 82'; Kulcsár 90'	(Report)		Stadium: Rohonci Street Stadium; Attendance: 4,000; Referee: (Hungary) Dániel Becséri

12 May 2012 28	Kaposvári Rákóczi FC	1–1	Szombathelyi Haladás	Kaposvár, Somogy County
18:00 CET (UTC+01)	Grumić 51'	(Report)	Nagy 15'	Stadium: Stadion Kaposvár Rákóczi; Attendance: 2,000; Referee: (Hungary) Balázs Berke

20 May 2012 29	Szombathelyi Haladás	2–1	Diósgyőri VTK	Szombathely, Vas County
15:00 CET (UTC+01)	Nagy 20'; Halmosi 89'	(Report)	Takács 3'	Stadium: Rohonci Street Stadium; Attendance: 4,000; Referee: (Hungary) Péter Solymosi

26 May 2012 30	Debreceni VSC	2–0	Szombathelyi Haladás	Debrecen, Hajdú-Bihar County
18:00 CET (UTC+01)	Mészáros 21'; Coulibaly 54' (pen.)	(Report)		Stadium: Stadion Oláh Gábor Út; Attendance: 10,000; Referee: (Hungary) István Vad

=== Classification ===
Pos	Team	Pld	W	D	L	GF	GA	GD	Pts
6	Paks	30	12	9	9	47	51	−4	45
7	Diósgyőr	30	13	4	13	42	43	−1	43
8	Haladás	30	9	11	10	39	37	+2	38
9	Siófok	30	9	9	12	30	41	−11	36
10	Kaposvár	30	7	14	9	35	42	−7	35

Source: MLSZ (in Hungarian)
Rules for classification: 1st points; 2nd overall wins; 3rd goal difference; 4th goals scored

=== Results summary ===
Overall								Home						Away					
Pld	W	D	L	GF	GA	GD	Pts	W	D	L	GF	GA	GD	W	D	L	GF	GA	GD
30	9	11	10	39	37	+2	38	7	6	2	26	16	+10	2	5	8	13	21	−8

Last updated: 27 May 2012.
Source: NB1

=== Results by round ===
Round	1	2	3	4	5	6	7	8	9	10	11	12	13	14	15	16	17	18	19	20	21	22	23	24	25	26	27	28	29	30
Ground	A	H	A	A	H	A	H	A	H	A	H	A	H	A	H	H	A	H	H	A	H	A	H	A	H	A	H	A	H	A
Result	L	L	L	D	W	W	D	L	W	L	W	L	D	L	L	D	D	D	W	D	W	D	D	L	D	W	W	D	W	L
Position	14	14	13	13 December 2011	11	11	9	9	9	10	10	11	12	12	11	12	10	10	9	10	10	11	11	10	8	8	8	8		

Updated to match(es) played on 27 May 2012. Source: Matches
A = Away; H = Home; W = Win; D = Draw; L = Loss

== Hungarian Cup ==
21 September 2011 3	Soproni VSE	0–2	Szombathelyi Haladás	Sopron, Győr-Moson-Sopron County
18:00		(Report)	Kenesei 19' 90+1'	Stadium: Stadion Városi; Attendance: 800; Referee: (Hungary) Balázs Berke

25 October 2011 4	Veszprém FC	0–2	Szombathelyi Haladás	Veszprém, Veszprém County
14:00		(Report)	Kenesei 76'; Sipos 90'	Stadium: Egyetemi Stadion; Attendance: 300; Referee: (Hungary) Béla Botló

=== Round of 16 ===
30 November 2011 1st leg	Videoton FC	1–0	Szombathelyi Haladás	Székesfehérvár, Fejér County
18:00	Vasiljević 22' (pen.)	(Report)		Stadium: Sóstói Stadion; Attendance: 923; Referee: (Hungary) József Berger

3 December 2011 2nd leg	Szombathelyi Haladás	0–0 (0–1 agg.)	Videoton FC	Szombathely, Vas County
15:00		(Report)		Stadium: Rohonci Street Stadium; Attendance: 2,000; Referee: (Hungary) Zsolt Szabó

== League Cup ==
=== Matches ===
31 August 2011 1	Szombathelyi Haladás	2–1	Zalaegerszegi TE	Szombathely, Vas County
18:00	Simon 67'; Czafit 77'	(Report)	Kovács 36'	Stadium: Rohonci Street Stadium; Attendance: 500; Referee: (Hungary) Krisztián Pánczél

6 September 2011 2	Győri ETO FC	2–2	Szombathelyi Haladás	Győr, Győr-Moson-Sopron County
16:30	Dudás 31'; Molnár 74'	(Report)	Ugrai 76'; Vujović 88' (pen.)	Stadium: ETO Park; Attendance: 300; Referee: (Hungary) Dániel Becséri

5 October 2011 3	Szombathelyi Haladás	2–0	Lombard-Pápa TFC	Szombathely, Vas County
18:00	Ugrai 22'; Skriba	(Report)		Stadium: Rohonci Street Stadium; Attendance: 500; Referee: (Hungary) Krisztián Pánczél

12 October 2011 4	Lombard-Pápa TFC	1–0	Szombathelyi Haladás	Pápa, Veszprém County
16:00	Tóth 81'	(Report)		Stadium: Stadion Várkerti; Attendance: 200; Referee: (Hungary) Dániel Becséri

9 November 2011 5	Szombathelyi Haladás	1–2	Győri ETO FC	Szombathely, Vas County
16:30	Skriba 84'	(Report)	Aleksidze 36'; Ceolin 55'	Stadium: Rohonci Street Stadium; Attendance: 500; Referee: (Hungary) Gábor Oláh

16 November 2011 6	Zalaegerszegi TE	3–0	Szombathelyi Haladás	Zalaegerszeg, Zala County
13:00	Kovács 25' 44'; Bujor 73'	(Report)		Stadium: ZTE Arena; Attendance: 150; Referee: (Hungary) Gábor Barna

==== Classification ====
Pos	Team	Pld	W	D	L	GF	GA	GD	Pts	Qualification
1	Lombard-Pápa	6	4	1	1	16	3	+13	13	Advance to knockout phase
2	Győri ETO FC	6	2	3	1	9	8	+1	9	
3	Szombathelyi Haladás	6	2	1	3	7	9	−2	7	
4	Zalaegerszegi TE	6	1	1	4	6	18	−12	4	

Rules for classification: 1) points; 2) goal difference; 3) number of goals scored.

== Pre Season (Winter) ==
21 January 2012	Szombathelyi Haladás	3–1	Szombathelyi Haladás II	Szombathely, Vas County
	Radó; Oross (pen.)	(Report)		Stadium: Rohonci Street Stadium; Attendance: 100

22 January 2012	Szombathelyi Haladás	1–1	FC Baník Ostrava (Czech Republic)	Lipót, Győr-Moson-Sopron County
	Halmosi 38'	(Report)	Greguš 20'

25 January 2012	Pécsi Mecsek FC	1–1	Szombathelyi Haladás	Siófok, Somogy County
	Regedei	(Report)	Ugrai

28 January 2012	Szombathelyi Haladás	5–1	Ajka FC	Szombathely, Vas County
	Halmosi 11'; Sipos 35'; Nagy 38'; Ugrai 79'; Tóth 83'	(Report)	Gaál 85'	Stadium: Rohonci Street Stadium; Attendance: 200; Referee: (Hungary) Király

1 February 2012	Szombathelyi Haladás	4–0	Soproni VSE	Szombathely, Vas County
	Tóth 15'; Oross 28' 32' 35'	(Report)		Stadium: Rohonci Street Stadium

4 February 2012	(Austria) FC Admira Wacker Mödling	5–0	Szombathelyi Haladás	Schwadorf, Wien-Umgebung District
	Regedei	(Report)

8 February 2012	Budapest Honvéd FC	5–1	Szombathelyi Haladás	Budapest, Pest County
	Ceolin 9'; Hadžić 10'; Apostu 25'; Ivancsics 46'; Horváth 56' (o.g.)	(Report)	Oross 90' (pen.)	Stadium: Bozsik Stadion; Attendance: 100; Referee: (Hungary) Antal

11 February 2012	Szombathelyi Haladás	0–1	Videoton FC II	Szombathely, Vas County
		(Report)	Máté 8' (pen.)	Stadium: Rohonci Street Stadium

11 February 2012	Szombathelyi Haladás	0–1	Gyirmót SE	Szombathely, Vas County
		(Report)	Nagy 54'	Stadium: Rohonci Street Stadium

14 February 2012	(Austria) SC Ritzing	2–7	Szombathelyi Haladás	Ritzing, Oberpullendorf District
		(Report)	Kenesei; Iszlai; Tóth; Horváth; Halmosi

18 February 2012	(Slovenia) NK Nafta Lendava	1–2	Szombathelyi Haladás	Lendava, Slovenia
	Gabriel (pen.)	(Report)	Kenesei; Ugrai

25 February 2012	Szombathelyi Haladás	3–1	Szombathelyi Haladás II	Szombathely, Vas County
	Radó 26'; Vujović 60' (pen.) 80'	(Report)	Czafit 24'	Stadium: Rohonci Street Stadium; Attendance: 200; Referee: (Hungary) Vass
