= Tamás Szép =

Hungarian footballer

Personal information
- Full name: Tamás Szép
- Date of birth: 14 October 1973 (age 53)
- Place of birth: Ajka, Hungary
- Height: 1.83 m (6 ft 0 in)
- Position: Goalkeeper

Senior career*
| Years | Team | Apps | (Gls) |
| 1998–2002 | Celldömölki VSE | 52 | (0) |
| 2002–2005 | Lombard-Pápa TFC | 76 | (0) |
| 2005–2007 | Celldömölki VSE | 41 | (0) |
| 2007–2008 | Ajka FC | 26 | (1) |
| 2008–2010 | Szombathelyi Haladás | 0 | (0) |
- * Club domestic league appearances and goals as of 3 March 2010

Tamás Szép (born 14 October 1973) is a Hungarian football player.
