= 2010–11 Ligakupa =

Tournament details
- Country: Hungary

The 2010–11 Ligakupa was the fourth edition of the Hungarian League Cup, the Ligakupa.

== Group stage ==
=== Group A ===
Pos	Team	Pld	W	D	L	GF	GA	GD	Pts	Qualification	KEC	SZL	HON
1	Kecskemét	4	3	1	0	11	3	+8	10	Advance to knockout phase	—	4–0	4–2
2	Szolnok	4	1	1	2	6	10	−4	4		1–1	—	3–4
3	Honvéd	4	1	0	3	7	11	−4	3		0–2	1–2	—

=== Group B ===
Pos	Team	Pld	W	D	L	GF	GA	GD	Pts	Qualification	PAK	VAS	MTK
1	Paks	4	3	0	1	12	5	+7	9	Advance to knockout phase	—	2–0	4–0
2	Vasas	4	2	0	2	7	8	−1	6		1–4	—	4–1
3	MTK	4	1	0	3	6	12	−6	3		4–2	1–2	—

=== Group C ===
Pos	Team	Pld	W	D	L	GF	GA	GD	Pts	Qualification	SZO	FTC	LOP
1	Haladás	4	2	2	0	6	4	+2	8	Advance to knockout phase	—	1–1	2–1
2	Ferencváros	4	1	3	0	5	3	+2	6		0–0	—	4–2
3	Pápa	4	0	1	3	5	9	−4	1		2–3	0–0	—

=== Group D ===
Pos	Team	Pld	W	D	L	GF	GA	GD	Pts	Qualification	SIÓ	ÚJP	KAP
1	Siófok	4	3	1	0	8	3	+5	10	Advance to knockout phase	—	1–0	1–1
2	Újpest	4	1	1	2	6	6	0	4		2–3	—	3–1
3	Kaposvár	4	0	2	2	3	8	−5	2		0–3	1–1	—

== Knockout phase ==
Quarter-finals
Győr	1	1	2
Haladás	2	1	3
Debrecen	2	0	2
Kecskemét	0	1	1
Zalaegerszeg	0	4	4
Siófok	2	0	2
Videoton	1	0	1
Paks (a)	1	0	1

Semi-finals
Haladás	0	0	0
Debrecen	2	0	2
Zalaegerszeg	1	1	2
Paks	2	2	4

Final
Debrecen	2	0	2
Paks	1	3	4

=== Quarter-finals ===
The matches will be played on 19 February and 9 March 2011.

Team 1	Agg.	Team 2	1st leg	2nd leg
Debrecen	2–1	Kecskemét	2–0	0–1
Videoton	1–1 (a)	Paks	1–1	0–0
Győr	2–3	Haladás	1–2	1–1
Zalaegerszeg	4–2	Siófok	0–2	4–0

=== Semi-finals ===
The matches were played on 26, 27 and 30 March 2011.

Team 1	Agg.	Team 2	1st leg	2nd leg
Zalaegerszeg	2–4	Paks	1–2	1–2
Haladás	0–2	Debrecen	0–2	0–0

=== Final ===
==== First leg ====
6 April 2011
17:30 (UTC+2)

Debrecen	2–1	Paks
Salami 14'; Yannick 41'		Vári 23'

Stadion Oláh Gábor Út, Debrecen
Referee: Ádám Farkas

==== Second leg ====
13 April 2011
17:30 (UTC+2)

Paks	3–0	Debrecen
Magasföldi 35', 72'; Bartha 65'

Fehérvári úti Stadion, Paks
Referee: Ádám Németh

Paks won 4–2 on aggregate.
