= Gábor Rajos =

Hungarian footballer

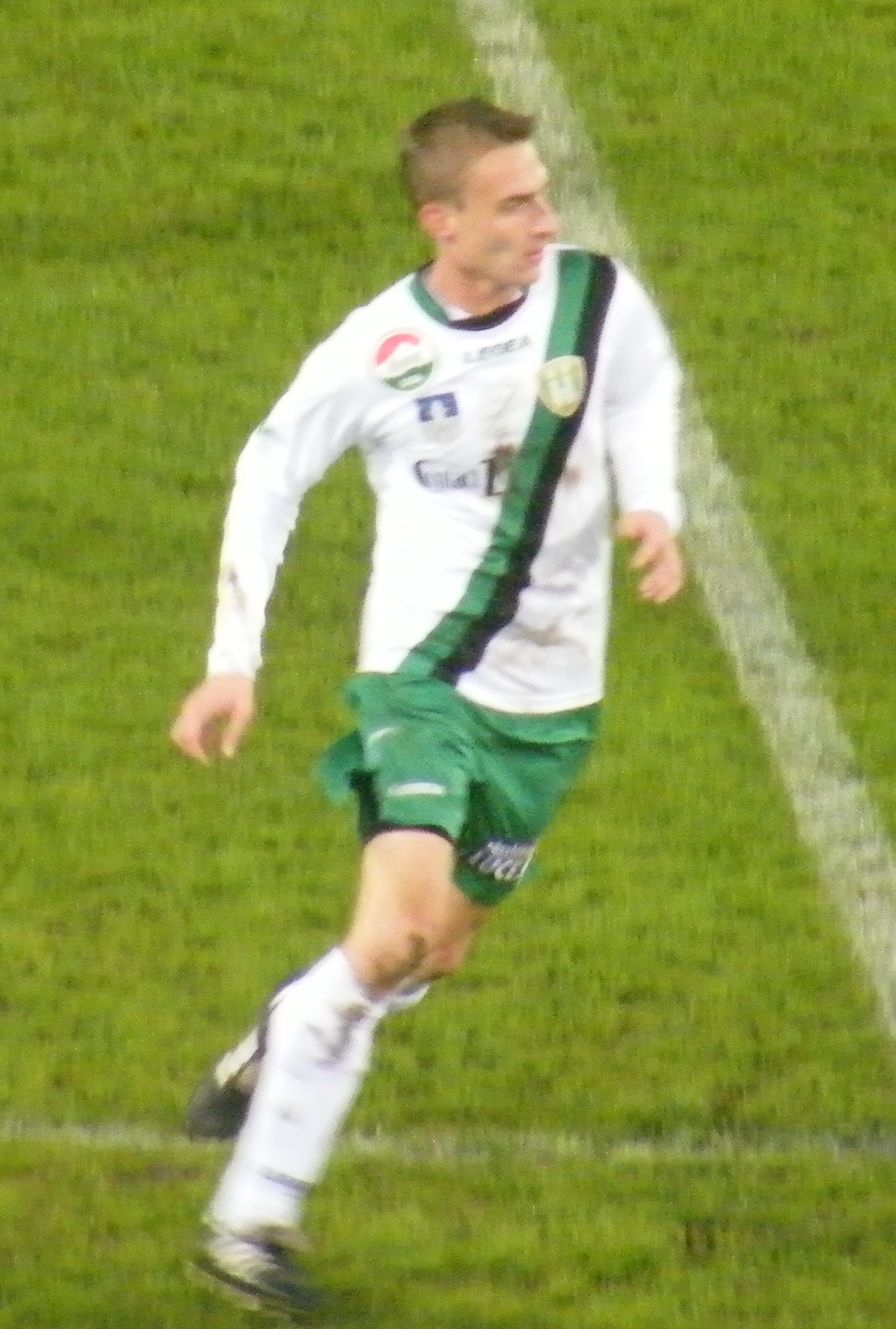
- Rajos in 2009

Personal information
- Full name: Gábor Rajos
- Date of birth: 17 March 1984 (age 42)
- Place of birth: Szombathely, Hungary
- Height: 1.80 m (5 ft 11 in)
- Position: Midfielder

Team information
- Current team: Ajka
- Number: 17

Youth career
- 1998–2003: Haladás

Senior career*
Years	Team	Apps	(Gls)
2003–2013	Haladás	187	(14)
2013–2014	Ajka	7	(0)
2015–2018	Sárvári	78	(9)
- * Club domestic league appearances and goals as of 1 June 2014

Gábor Rajos (born 17 March 1984 in Szombathely) was a Hungarian football player who won the Hungarian Championship bronze medal, playing as a midfielder.

== Career ==
He played for Szombathelyi Haladás between 2004 and 2013, where he was a member of the Hungarian Championship bronze medal team in the 2008–09 season. He spent three years in the Hungarian Second Division appearing in 57 matches and scoring two goals before his team was promoted to the Hungarian First Division.

He played for FC Ajka in 2013–14 and for Sárvári FC between 2015 and 2018.

He played in a total of 99 top-flight matches, 95 NB II matches and 61 NB III matches.

== Honours ==
Hungarian Second Division:
Winner: 2008

== Career statistics ==
Appearances and goals by club, season and competition
Club	Season	League		Cup		League Cup		Europe		Total	
Club	Season	Apps	Goals	Apps	Goals	Apps	Goals	Apps	Goals	Apps	Goals
Haladás
Haladás	2003–04	5	0	0	0	0	0	0	0	5	0
Haladás	2004–05	16	1	1	0	0	0	0	0	17	1
Haladás	2005–06	25	1	0	0	0	0	0	0	25	1
Haladás	2006–07	29	4	0	0	0	0	0	0	29	4
Haladás	2007–08	18	0	0	0	0	0	0	0	18	0
Haladás	2008–09	23	7	1	0	3	0	0	0	27	7
Haladás	2009–10	18	1	2	0	3	0	2	0	25	1
Haladás	2010–11	15	0	1	0	6	0	0	0	22	0
Haladás	2011–12	21	0	3	0	2	0	0	0	26	0
Haladás	2012–13	15	0	2	0	4	0	0	0	21	0
Haladás	2013–14	2	0	2	0	5	0	0	0	9	0
Haladás	Total	187	14	12	0	23	0	2	0	224	14
Ajka
Ajka	2013–14	7	0	0	0	0	0	0	0	7	0
Ajka	Total	7	0	0	0	0	0	0	0	7	0
Career total		194	14	12	0	23	0	2	0	231	14

Updated to games played as of 1 June 2014.
