= Rohonci út =

Former multi-purpose stadium in Hungary

Coordinates: 47.234762°N 16.607117°E

Rohonci Street Stadium
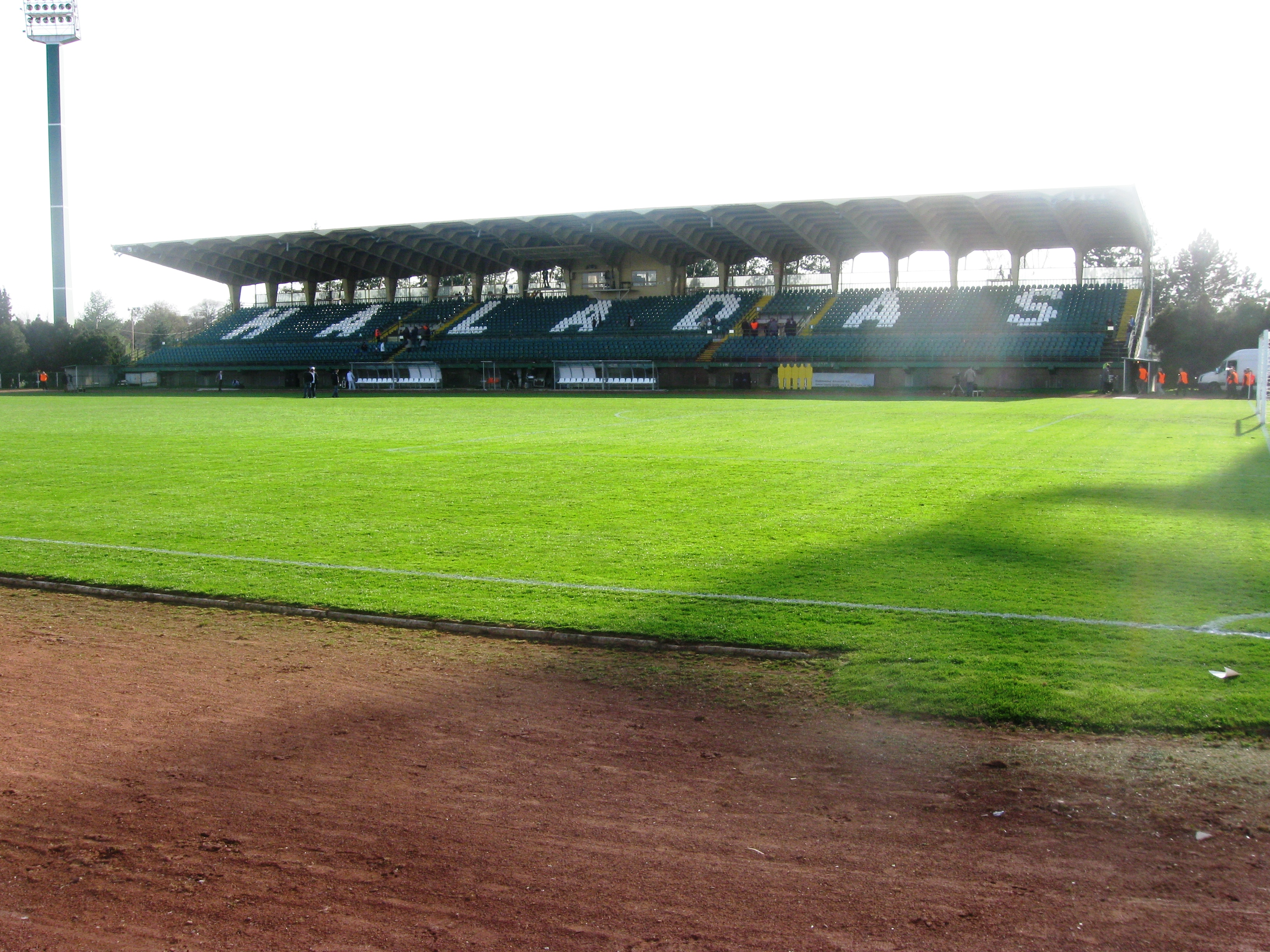
- Interactive map of Rohonci Street Stadium
- Location: Szombathely, Hungary
- Owner: Hungarian State
- Capacity: 9,500
- Surface: Grass; Field
- Field size: 105 × 68 m (344 × 223 ft)

Construction
- Groundbreaking: 1923
- Built: 1923
- Opened: 1923
- Renovated: 2008
- Demolished: 2016

Tenant
- Szombathelyi Haladás

Stadion Rohonci Út (Hungarian: Rohonci úti stadion) was a multi-purpose stadium in Szombathely, Hungary. It was home to Szombathelyi Haladás. The stadium was able to hold 12,500 people and was built in 1923. It hosted the hammer throw events for the IAAF World Athletics Final as the Stade Louis II in Monaco is too small.

== History ==
=== Demolition ===
On 19 January 2016, the seats were removed from the old stadium. Some of these seats were purchased by the club's supporters and the rest was acquired by smaller clubs based in Vas County.

On 23 February the flood lights were demolished.

== Gallery ==
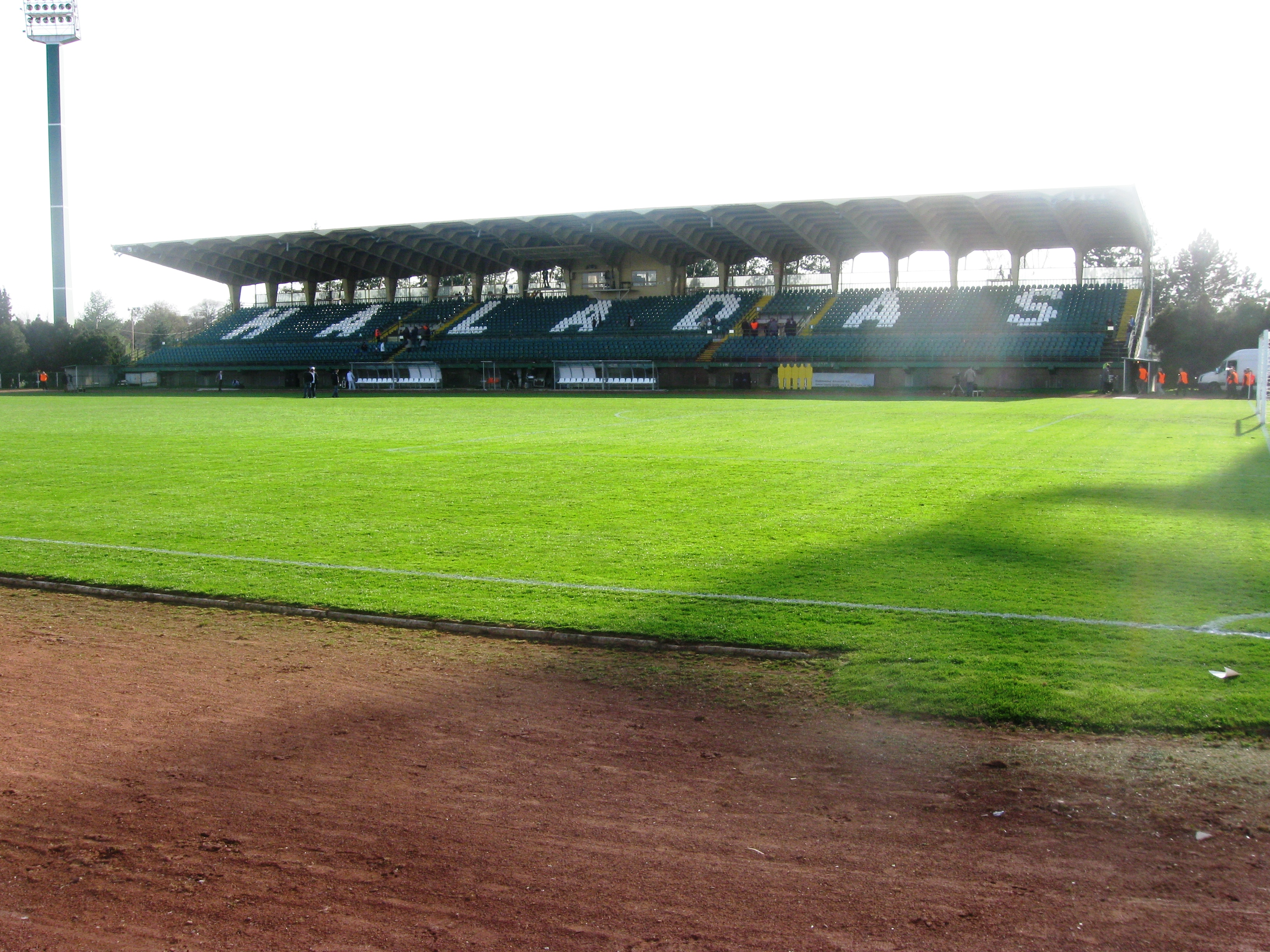
The former main stand (demolished in 2016)

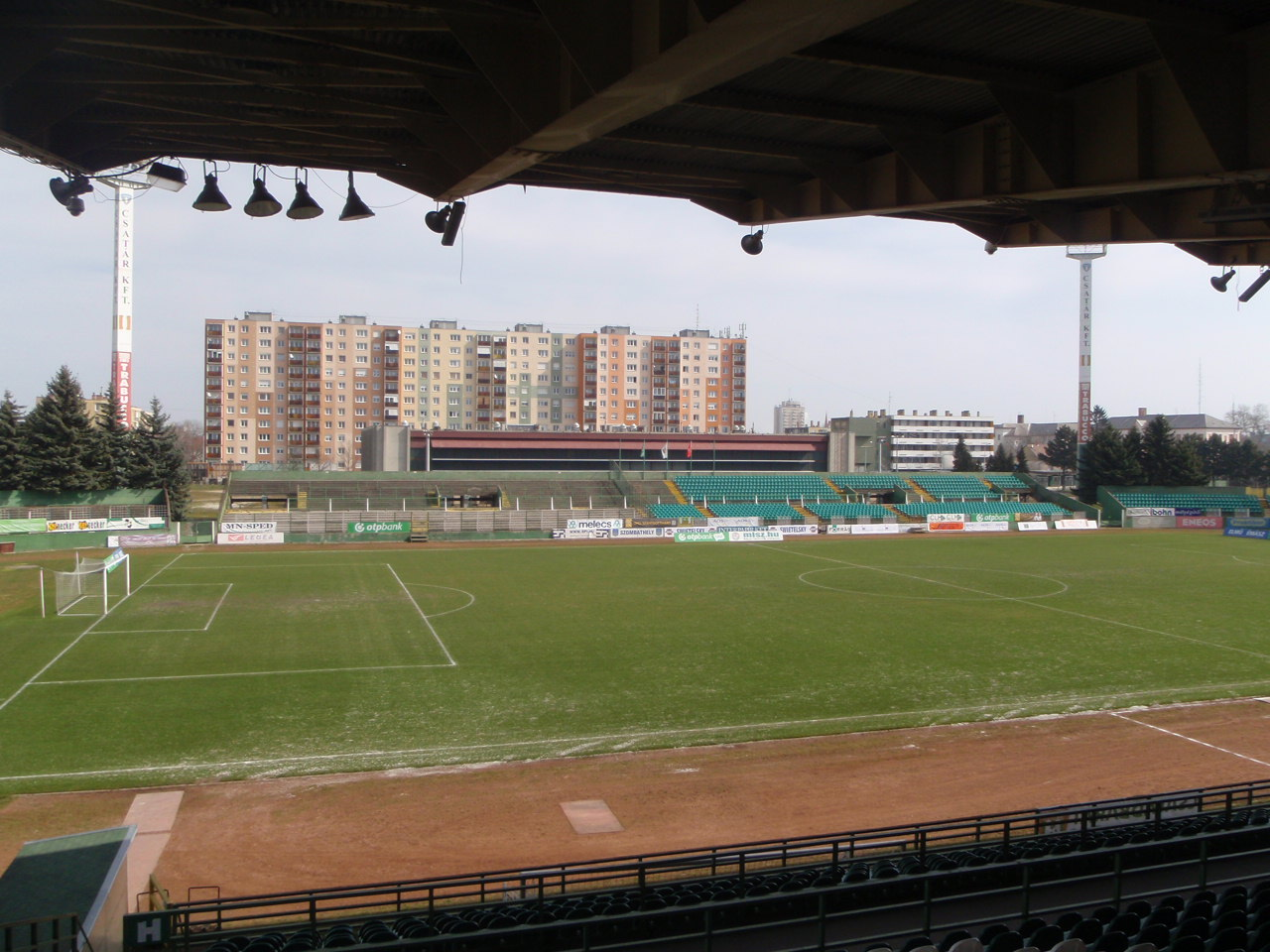
The view from the former main stand (demolished in 2016)

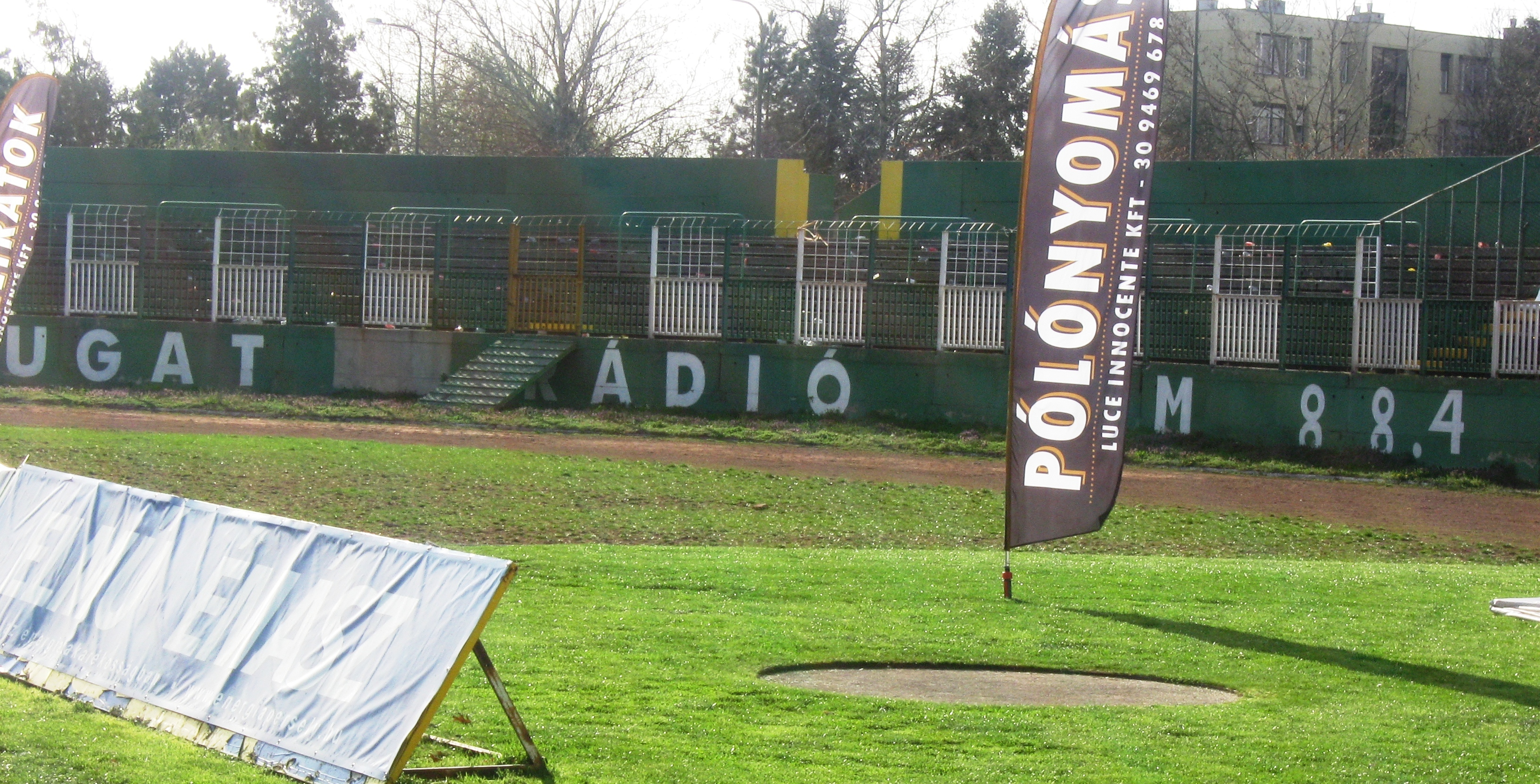
The former away stand (demolished in 2016)

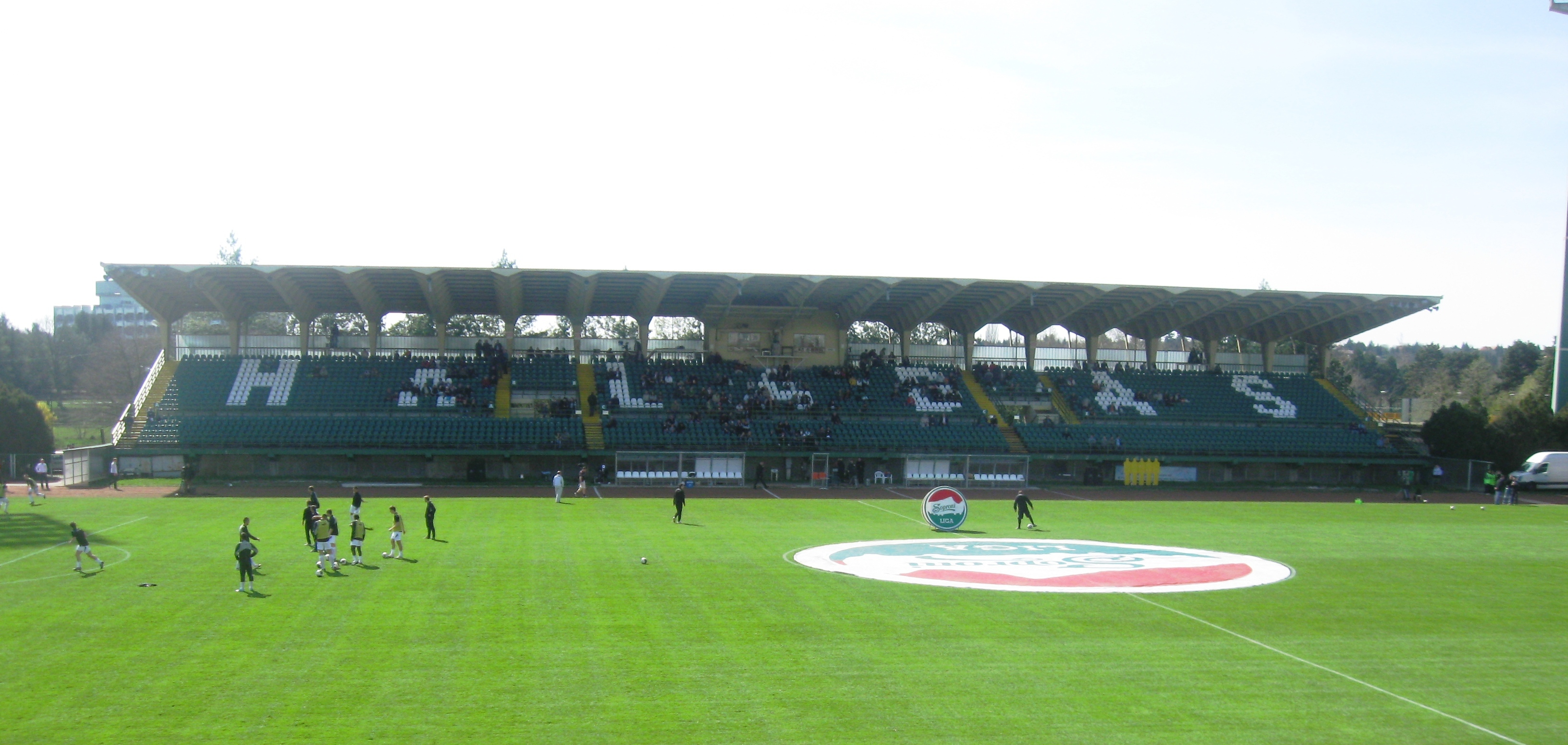
The former main stand (demolished in 2016)

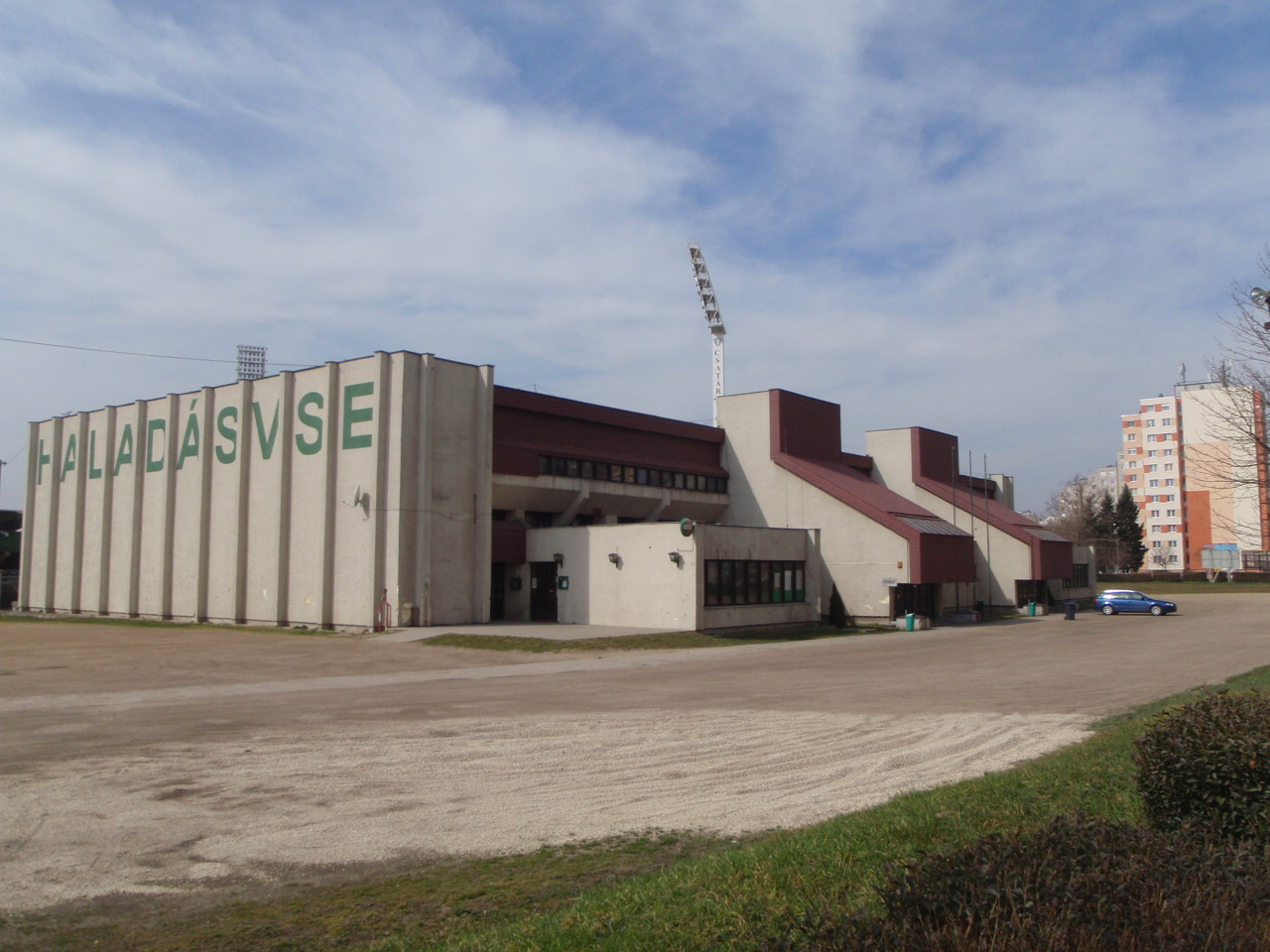
The former sports hall (demolished in 2016)

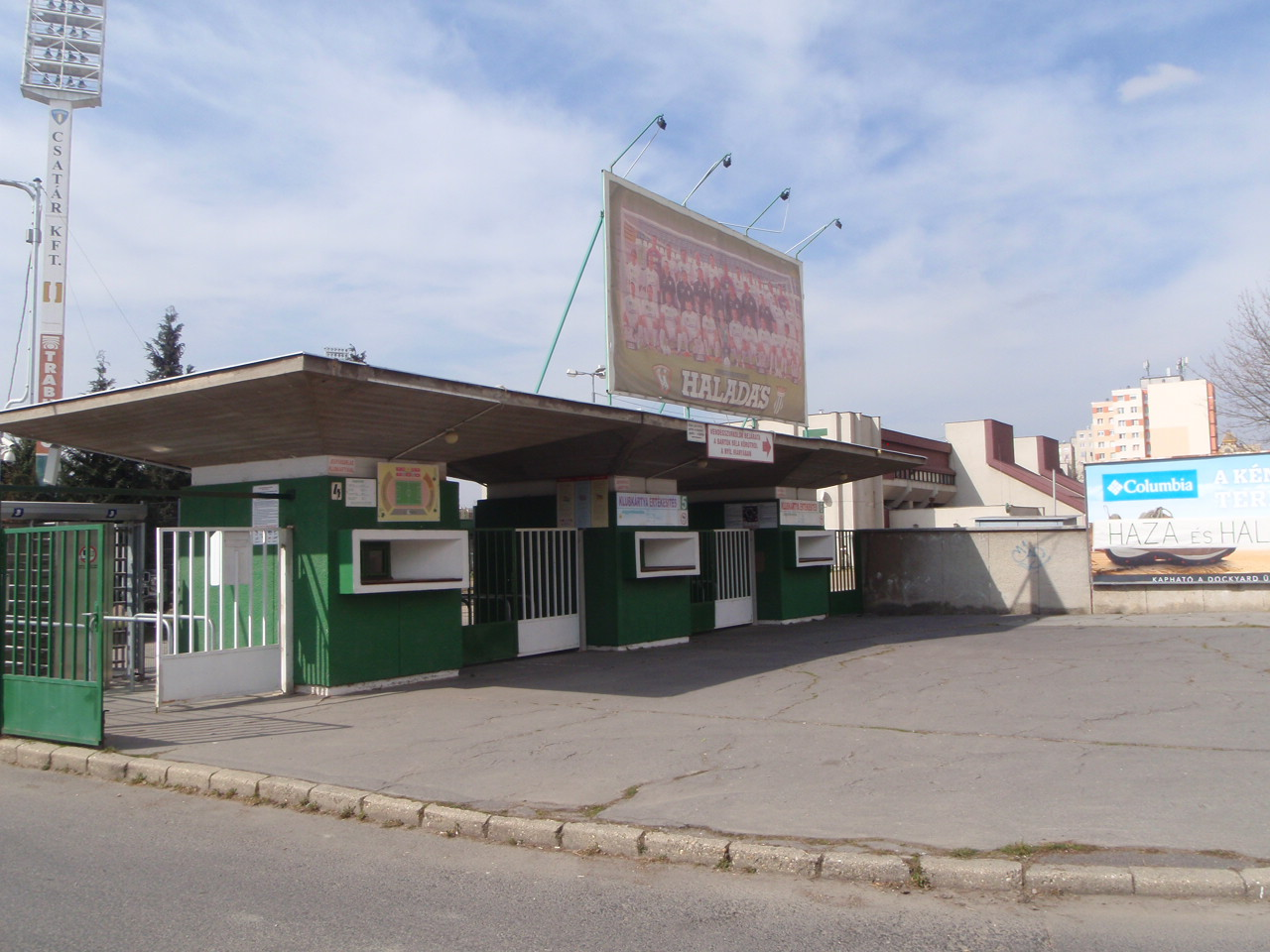
The former cashier and entrance (demolished in 2016)
