= Péter Tóth (footballer, born 1977) =

Hungarian footballer

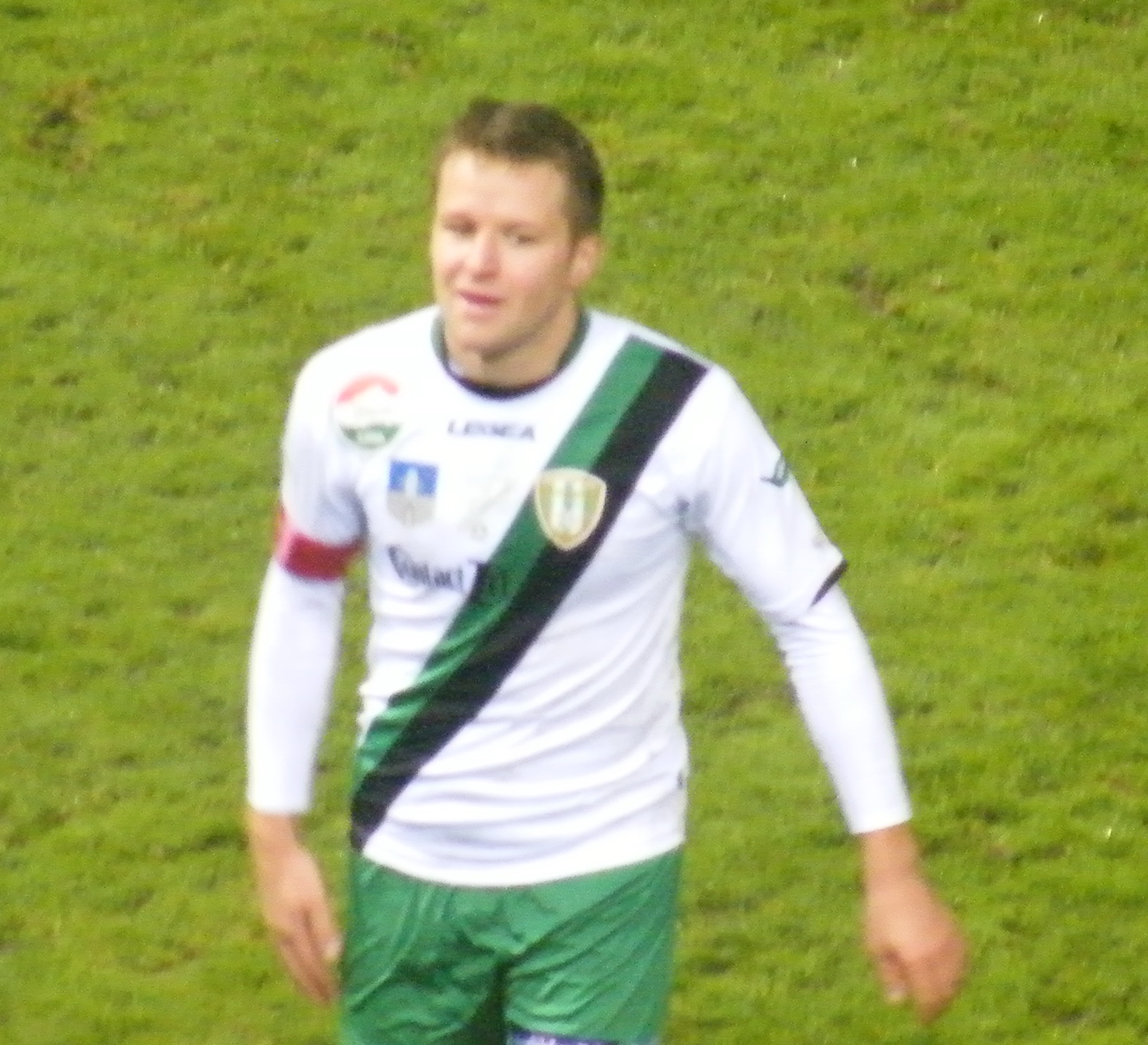

Personal information
- Full name: Péter Tóth
- Date of birth: 25 June 1977 (age 49)
- Place of birth: Szombathely, Hungary
- Height: 1.79 m (5 ft 10 in)
- Position: Defender

Team information
- Current team: SC Dörfl
- Number: 15

Senior career*
| Years | Team | Apps | (Gls) |
| 1996–2004 | Haladás | 154 | (14) |
| 2004–2007 | Győr | 60 | (3) |
| 2007–2014 | Haladás | 180 | (22) |
| 2014–2015 | SC Pinkafeld | 26 | (4) |
| 2015–2016 | UFC Jennersdorf | 30 | (6) |
| 2016–2017 | SC Lockenhaus | 24 | (2) |
| 2017–2018 | SV Oberloisdorf | 31 | (4) |
| 2019–2020 | SC Lockenhaus | 27 | (4) |
| 2020– | SC Dörfl | 7 | (4) |

Managerial career
- 2017–2018: SV Oberloisdorf (player-coach)
- 2019–2020: SC Lockenhaus (player-coach)
- * Club domestic league appearances and goals as of 12:42, 17 January 2021 (UTC)

Péter Tóth (born 25 June 1977 in Szombathely) is a Hungarian football player who currently plays for SC Dörfl.

== Coaching career ==
After spells in Austria at SC Pinkafeld, UFC Jennersdorf and SC Lockenhaus, Tóth was appointed player-coach at fellow Austrian club SV Oberloisdorf in the summer 2017. In January 2019, Tóth returned to SC Lockenhaus, this time in a role as a player-coach.

In the summer 2020, Tóth joined SC Dörfl.
