= Dániel Rózsa =

Hungarian footballer

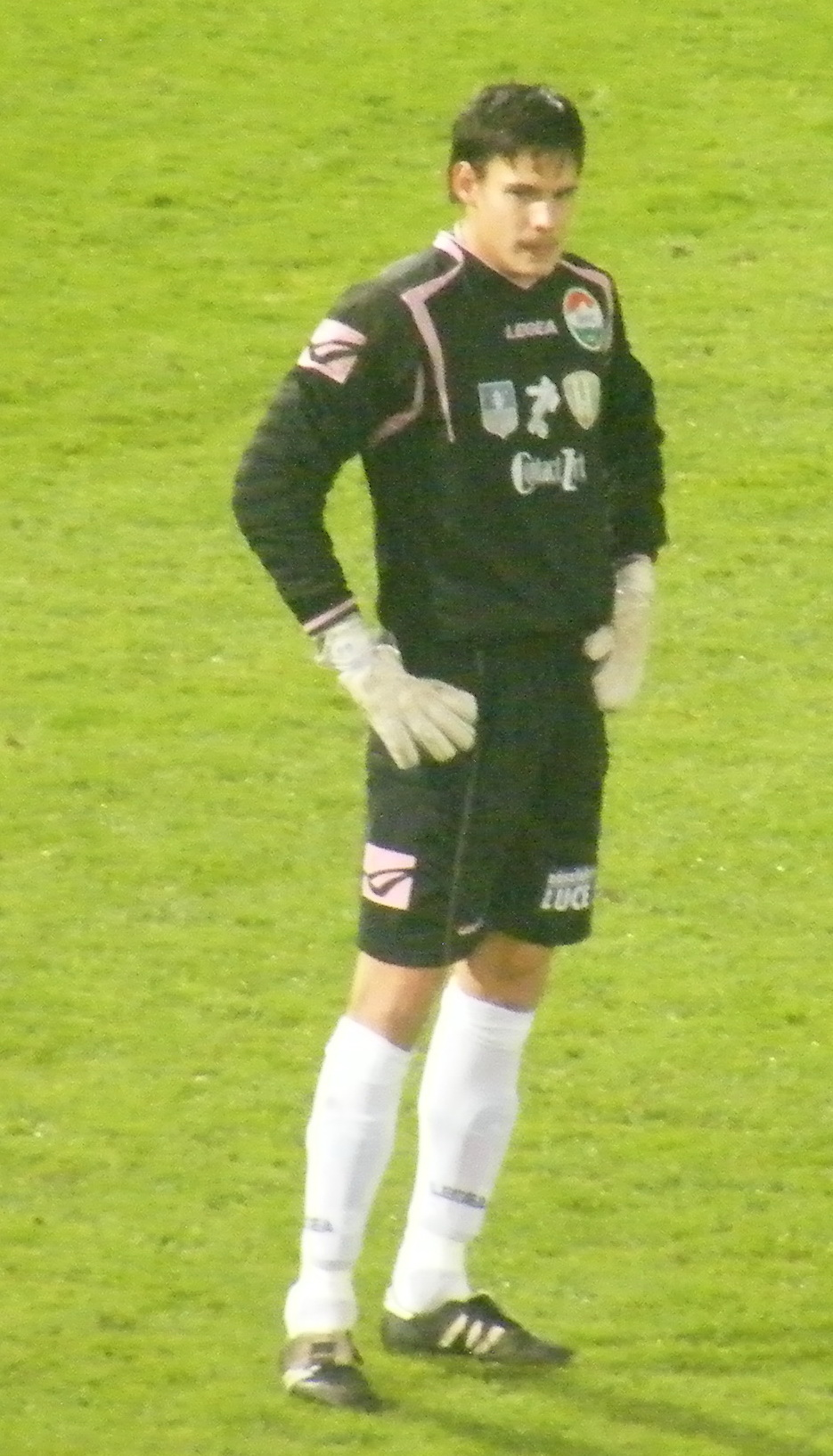
- Rózsa in 2009

Personal information
- Date of birth: 24 November 1984 (age 41)
- Place of birth: Szombathely, Hungary
- Height: 1.88 m (6 ft 2 in)
- Position: Goalkeeper

Team information
- Current team: USC Pilgersdorf

Youth career
- Haladás

Senior career*
Years	Team	Apps	(Gls)
2003	Haladás	0	(0)
2003–2004	Pápa		
2004–2022	Haladás	297	(0)
2022	Répcelak		
2023–	USC Pilgersdorf		

International career^{‡}
1999–2000	Hungary U-15	1	(0)
2014	Hungary	2	(0)
- * Club domestic league appearances and goals as of 19 May 2019 ‡ National team caps and goals as of 5 August 2015

Dániel Rózsa (born 24 November 1984) is a Hungarian footballer who plays for Austrian club USC Pilgersdorf.

== Honours ==
Hungarian Second Division:
Winner: 2008

== Career statistics ==
Appearances and goals by club, season and competition
Club	Season	League		Cup		League Cup		Europe		Total	
Club	Season	Apps	Goals	Apps	Goals	Apps	Goals	Apps	Goals	Apps	Goals
Haladás
Haladás	2004–05	3	0	0	0	0	0	0	0	3	0
Haladás	2005–06	15	0	0	0	0	0	0	0	15	0
Haladás	2006–07	3	0	0	0	0	0	0	0	3	0
Haladás	2007–08	20	0	0	0	0	0	0	0	23	1
Haladás	2008–09	30	0	4	0	1	0	0	0	35	0
Haladás	2009–10	30	0	1	0	1	0	4	0	36	0
Haladás	2010–11	30	0	3	0	4	0	0	0	37	0
Haladás	2011–12	27	0	2	0	0	0	0	0	29	1
Haladás	2012–13	25	0	1	0	2	0	0	0	28	0
Haladás	2013–14	30	0	2	0	2	0	0	0	34	0
Haladás	2014–15	25	0	2	0	0	0	0	0	27	0
Haladás	2015–16	0	0	5	0	–	–	–	–	5	0
Haladás	2016–17	12	0	1	0	–	–	–	–	13	0
Haladás	2017–18	2	0	1	0	–	–	–	–	3	0
Haladás	2018–19	12	0	1	0	–	–	–	–	13	0
Haladás	Total	264	0	23	0	10	0	4	0	301	0
Career total		264	0	21	0	10	0	4	0	301	0

Updated to games played as of 19 May 2019.
