= Máté Skriba =

Hungarian footballer

Personal information
- Full name: Máté Skriba
- Date of birth: 13 March 1992 (age 34)
- Place of birth: Celldömölk, Hungary
- Height: 1.72 m (5 ft 7 1/2 in)
- Position: Striker

Team information
- Current team: Pápa
- Number: 32

Youth career
- 2003–2006: Celldömölk
- 2006–2009: Haladás

Senior career*
Years	Team	Apps	(Gls)
2009–2015	Haladás	27	(0)
2010–2011	→ MTK (loan)	2	(0)
2012–2013	→ Tatabánya (loan)	24	(4)
2013–2014	→ Ajka (loan)	24	(3)
2014	→ Veszprém (loan)	13	(2)
2015–2016	Budafok	39	(14)
2016–2017	Ajka	25	(3)
2017–2018	Pápa	16	(4)
2018–2020	Sárvár	46	(13)
2020–	Pápa	48	(10)

International career^{‡}
2008–2009	Hungary U-17	?	(?)
2009–2012	Hungary U-19	7	(4)
2010–2011	Hungary U-20	2	(1)
2012–2014	Hungary U-21	2	(0)
- * Club domestic league appearances and goals as of 7 February 2022 ‡ National team caps and goals as of 14 November 2012

Máté Skriba (born 13 March 1992) is a Hungarian football player who currently plays for FC Ajka on loan from Haladás.

== Career statistics ==
As of 7 February 2022

Appearances and goals by club, season and competition
Club	Season	League			Cup		Continental		Other		Total	
Club	Season	Division	Apps	Goals	Apps	Goals	Apps	Goals	Apps	Goals	Apps	Goals
Szombathely II	2008–09	Nemzeti Bajnokság III	20	10	—		—		—		20	10
Szombathely II	2009–10	Nemzeti Bajnokság III	12	4	—		—		—		12	4
Szombathely II	2010–11	Nemzeti Bajnokság III	6	2	—		—		—		6	2
Szombathely II	2011–12	Nemzeti Bajnokság III	23	17	—		—		—		23	17
Szombathely II	Total		61	33	0	0	0	0	0	0	61	33
Szombathely	2008–09	Nemzeti Bajnokság I	9	0	0	0	—		8	4	17	4
Szombathely	2009–10	Nemzeti Bajnokság I	14	0	2	0	—		5	1	21	1
Szombathely	2010–11	Nemzeti Bajnokság I	0	0	0	0	—		1	0	1	0
Szombathely	2011–12	Nemzeti Bajnokság I	4	0	2	0	—		4	2	10	2
Szombathely	Total		27	0	4	0	0	0	18	7	49	7
MTK Budapest II	2010–11	Nemzeti Bajnokság III	9	1	—		—		—		9	1
MTK Budapest II	Total		9	1	0	0	0	0	0	0	9	1
MTK Budapest	2010–11	Nemzeti Bajnokság I	2	0	0	0	—		2	1	4	1
MTK Budapest	Total		2	0	0	0	0	0	2	1	4	1
Tatabánya	2012–13	Nemzeti Bajnokság II	24	4	1	0	—		1	0	26	4
Tatabánya	Total		24	4	1	0	0	0	1	0	26	4
Ajka	2013–14	Nemzeti Bajnokság II	24	3	4	2	—		2	0	30	5
Ajka	2016–17	Nemzeti Bajnokság III	25	3	0	0	—		—		25	3
Ajka	Total		49	6	4	2	0	0	2	0	55	8
Veszprém	2014–15	Nemzeti Bajnokság III	13	2	1	0	—		—		14	2
Veszprém	Total		13	2	1	0	0	0	0	0	14	2
Budafok	2014–15	Nemzeti Bajnokság III	12	6	0	0	—		—		12	6
Budafok	2015–16	Nemzeti Bajnokság III	27	8	2	0	—		—		29	8
Budafok	Total		39	14	2	0	0	0	0	0	41	14
Sárvár	2018–19	Nemzeti Bajnokság III	28	7	1	0	—		—		29	7
Sárvár	2019–20	Nemzeti Bajnokság III	18	6	1	0	—		—		19	6
Sárvár	Total		46	13	2	0	0	0	0	0	48	13
Pápa	2017–18	Nemzeti Bajnokság III	16	4	0	0	—		—		16	4
Pápa	2020–21	Nemzeti Bajnokság III	30	9	1	0	—		—		31	9
Pápa	2021–22	Nemzeti Bajnokság III	18	1	2	4	—		—		20	5
Pápa	Total		64	14	3	4	0	0	0	0	67	18
Career total			334	87	17	6	0	0	23	8	374	101
