= Szabolcs Schimmer =

Hungarian footballer

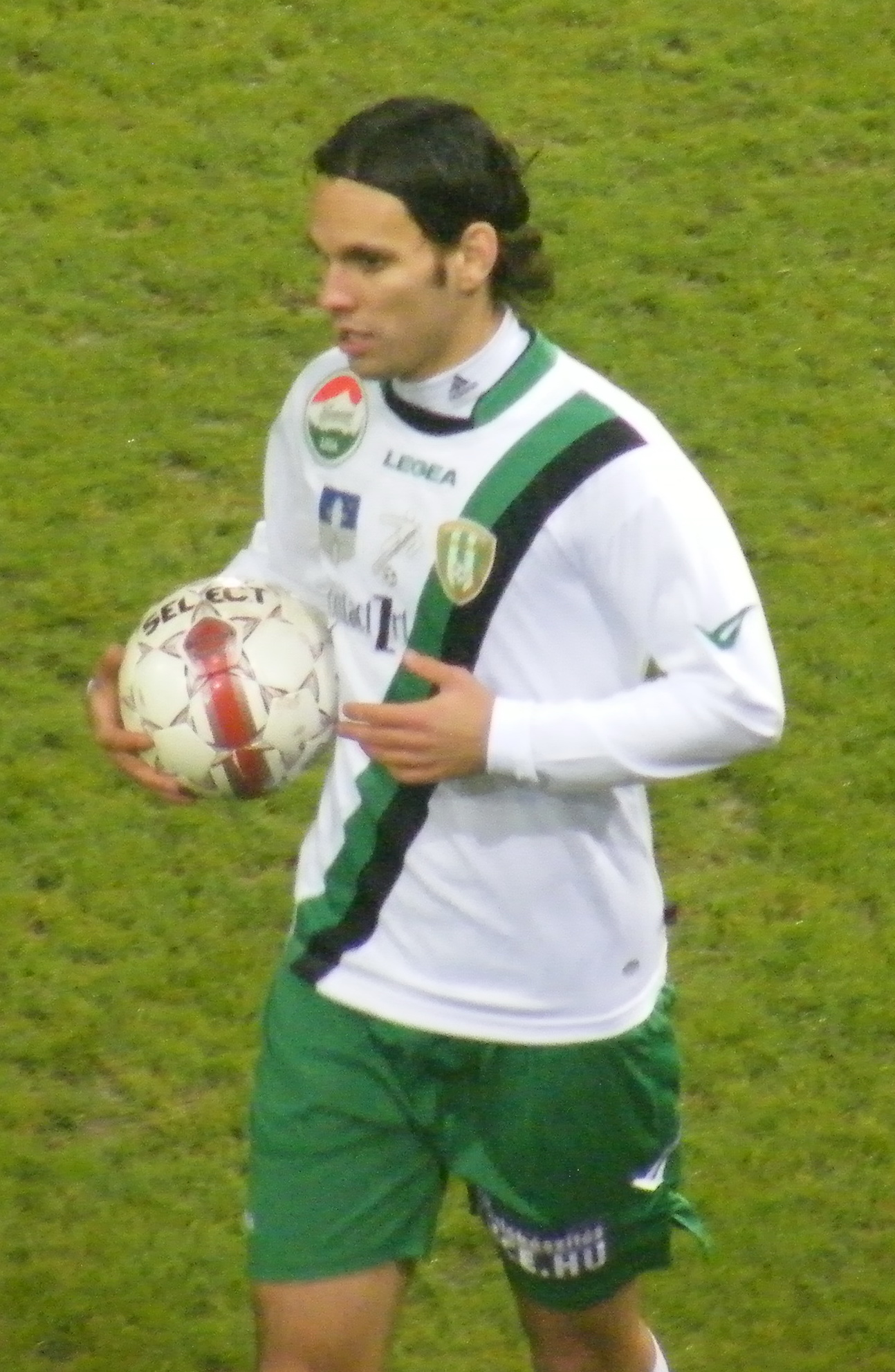
- Hungarian football player, Szabolcs Schimmer holding a ball

Personal information
- Full name: Szabolcs Gábor Schimmer
- Date of birth: 24 February 1984 (age 42)
- Place of birth: Szombathely, Hungary
- Height: 1.80 m (5 ft 11 in)
- Positions: Right back; centre back

Team information
- Current team: Király
- Number: 5

Youth career
- 1998–2003: Haladás

Senior career*
Years	Team	Apps	(Gls)
2003–2019	Haladás	327	(13)
2019	Sárvár	11	(1)
2020–2021	Haladás	25	(0)
2021–	Király	0	(0)
- * Club domestic league appearances and goals as of 16 May 2021

Szabolcs Gábor Schimmer (born 24 February 1984) is a Hungarian football player who plays for Király.

== Career ==
After 16 years at Szombathelyi Haladás, Schimmer's contract expired in the summer of 2019 and he then joined Sárvári FC. However, on 10 January 2020, he returned to Haladás.

== Career statistics ==
Appearances and goals by club, season and competition
Club	Season	League		Cup		League Cup		Europe		Total	
Club	Season	Apps	Goals	Apps	Goals	Apps	Goals	Apps	Goals	Apps	Goals
Haladás
Haladás	2003–04	9	1	0	0	0	0	0	0	9	1
Haladás	2004–05	17	4	1	0	0	0	0	0	18	4
Haladás	2005–06	27	1	0	0	0	0	0	0	27	1
Haladás	2006–07	24	2	0	0	0	0	0	0	24	2
Haladás	2007–08	23	1	0	0	0	0	0	0	23	1
Haladás	2008–09	23	0	1	0	6	1	0	0	30	1
Haladás	2009–10	26	1	1	0	0	0	4	0	31	1
Haladás	2010–11	26	1	2	0	2	0	0	0	30	1
Haladás	2011–12	25	1	4	0	2	0	0	0	31	1
Haladás	2012–13	27	0	2	0	0	0	0	0	29	0
Haladás	2013–14	25	0	1	0	7	0	0	0	33	0
Haladás	2014–15	21	0	3	0	1	0	0	0	25	0
Haladás	2015–16	13	0	5	0	–	–	–	–	18	0
Haladás	2016–17	15	1	3	0	–	–	–	–	18	1
Haladás	2017–18	17	0	2	1	–	–	–	–	19	1
Haladás	2018–19	9	0	5	0	–	–	–	–	14	0
Haladás	Total	327	13	30	1	18	1	4	0	379	15
Career total		327	13	30	1	18	1	4	0	379	15

Updated to games played as of 16 March 2019.
