= Márton Oross =

Hungarian footballer

Personal information
- Date of birth: 3 March 1981 (age 45)
- Place of birth: Győr, Hungary
- Height: 1.88 m (6 ft 2 in)
- Position: Striker

Team information
- Current team: Hungary U-18 (manager)

Youth career
- 1993–1995: Győr
- 1995–1997: Mosonmagyaróvár

Senior career*
Years	Team	Apps	(Gls)
1997–2004	Győr	55	(2)
1999–2000	→ Mosonmagyaróvár (loan)	17	(11)
2002–2003	→ Kecskemét (loan)	28	(11)
2004–2006	Integrál-DAC	60	(32)
2006–2008	Gyirmót	45	(29)
2008–2012	Szombathely	106	(22)
2012–2015	Gyirmót	85	(31)
2015–2021	UFC Pamhagen		

International career
1996–1997	Hungary U-16	19	(9)
1998–1999	Hungary U-17	7	(3)
1998–1999	Hungary U-18	4	(0)

Managerial career
- 2021–: Hungary U-18
- * Club domestic league appearances and goals

Márton Oross (born 3 March 1981) is a Hungarian football coach and a former player. He is the head coach of the Hungary national under-18 team.
