= Marián Sluka =

Slovak footballer

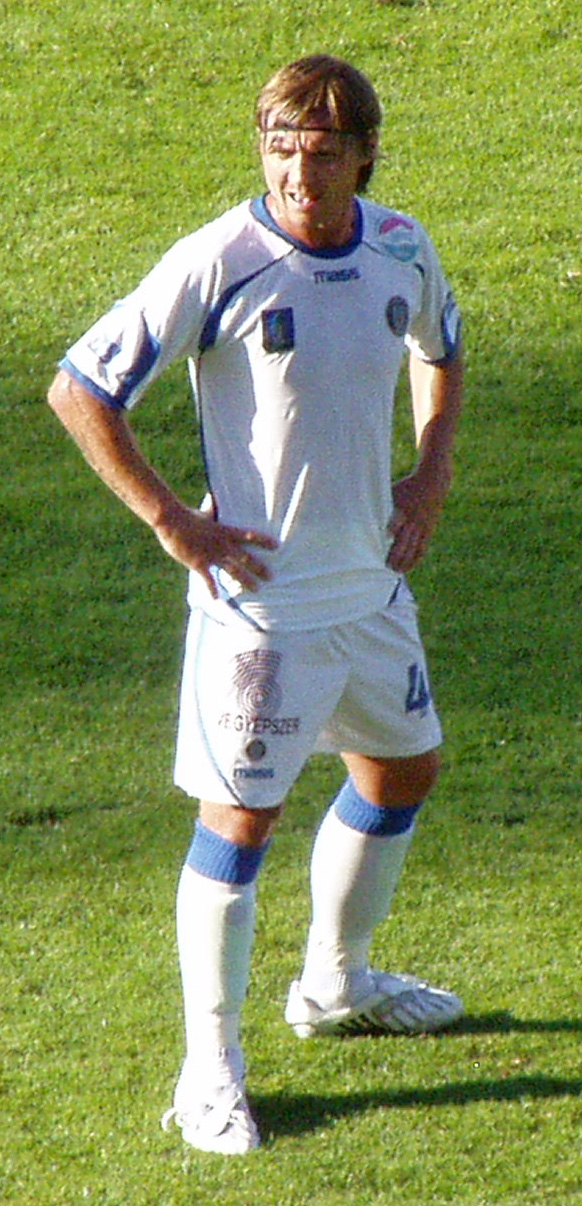

Personal information
- Date of birth: 22 July 1979 (age 47)
- Place of birth: Rimavská Sobota, Czechoslovakia
- Height: 1.75 m (5 ft 9 in)
- Position: Midfielder

Senior career*
Years	Team	Apps	(Gls)
1997–2003	Žiar nad Hronom		
2003–2005	Rimavska Sobota	54	(1)
2005–2007	Skonto Rīga	43	(2)
2007–2008	Senec	11	(1)
2008–2010	Zalaegerszeg	43	(5)
2010	Neman Grodno	5	(1)
2011–2012	Szombathelyi Haladás	24	(1)
2012	Siófok	5	(0)
2013–2014	Zalaegerszeg	28	(0)
2014–2015	Pápa	21	(1)
2015–2016	Velika Polana	19	(5)
2016–2017	Baník Veľký Krtíš		

Managerial career
- 2019: Nafta 1903
- * Club domestic league appearances and goals

Marián Sluka (born 22 July 1979) is a Slovak former football midfielder.
