= Gábor Korolovszky =

Hungarian footballer (born 1979)

Personal information
- Full name: Gábor Korolovszky
- Date of birth: 11 July 1979 (age 47)
- Place of birth: Budapest, Hungary
- Height: 1.86 m (6 ft 1 in)
- Positions: Central defender; defensive midfielder

Senior career*
Years	Team	Apps	(Gls)
1997–1998	MTK Hungária	16	(0)
1998–1999	BKV Előre	22	(3)
1999–2000	Real Madrid B	0	(0)
2000	Toledo	7	(0)
2000–2003	Újpest	74	(1)
2003–2006	Omonia	48	(2)
2006–2008	Apollon Limassol	54	(3)
2009–2010	Aris Limassol	18	(0)
2010–2013	Szombathelyi Haladás	44	(0)
2013	Nyíregyháza Spartacus	0	(0)
2015	Örkény	0	(0)
Total		283	(9)

International career
1996–1997	Hungary U17	5	(0)
1998–2000	Hungary U21	4	(0)
2002–2003	Hungary	6	(0)
- * Club domestic league appearances and goals

Gábor Korolovszky (born 11 July 1979 ) is a Hungarian former professional footballer who played as a defender.
