= Norbert Sipos =

Hungarian footballer

Personal information
- Date of birth: 21 March 1981 (age 45)
- Place of birth: Szombathely, Hungary
- Height: 1.70 m (5 ft 7 in)
- Position: Midfielder

Team information
- Current team: Ajka
- Number: 18

Youth career
- 1994–1999: Haladás

Senior career*
Years	Team	Apps	(Gls)
1999–2001	Haladás	14	(0)
2001	Bük		
2001–2002	Celldömölki VSE		
2002–2003	Pápa	31	(0)
2003–2004	Sopron	5	(0)
2004–2005	Tatabánya	7	(0)
2005	Nyíregyháza	11	(0)
2005–2006	Pécs	20	(1)
2006–2009	Haladás	66	(6)
2009–2010	Nea Salamina	6	(0)
2010–2012	Haladás	43	(4)
2012–2013	Siófok	9	(1)
2013–2014	Ajka	38	(2)
2014–2017	ASK Kaisersdorf		
2017–2020	SV Rechnitz		

International career
1996–1997	Hungary U-15	6	(0)
- * Club domestic league appearances and goals

Norbert Sipos (born 21 March 1981) is a Hungarian former football player.

== Honours ==
Hungarian second division:
Winner: 2008
