= Dániel Lengyel =

Hungarian footballer

Personal information
- Full name: Dániel Lengyel
- Date of birth: 1 March 1989 (age 37)
- Place of birth: Budapest, Hungary
- Height: 1.93 m (6 ft 4 in)
- Position: Defender

Youth career
- 2002–2003: Vasas
- 2003–2007: MTK

Senior career*
Years	Team	Apps	(Gls)
2007–2009	MTK	0	(0)
2009–2011	Haladás	28	(2)
2011–2012	Siófok	19	(0)
2012–2013	Békéscsaba	24	(2)
2013–2018	Gyirmót	47	(1)

International career
2006–2007	Hungary U-17	17	(3)
2007–2008	Hungary U-19	19	(4)
2008–2009	Hungary U-20	7	(0)
- * Club domestic league appearances and goals

Dániel Lengyel (born 1 March 1989 in Budapest) is a retired Hungarian football player.
