= Gábor Nagy (footballer, born 1985) =

Hungarian footballer

Personal information
- Full name: Gábor Nagy
- Date of birth: 16 October 1985 (age 41)
- Place of birth: Szombathely, Hungary
- Height: 1.83 m (6 ft 0 in)
- Position: Midfielder

Team information
- Current team: ZTE
- Number: 14

Youth career
- Haladás

Senior career*
Years	Team	Apps	(Gls)
2004–2008	Haladás	104	(20)
2008–2011	MTK	26	(2)
2009–2011	→ Haladás (loan)	54	(9)
2011–2014	Haladás	75	(4)
2014–2017	Újpest	42	(0)
2017–	ZTE	9	(0)

International career
2014	Hungary	1	(0)
- * Club domestic league appearances and goals as of 19 November 2017

Gábor Nagy (born 16 October 1985) is a Hungarian international football player who currently plays for Zalaegerszegi TE.
