= Ignác Irhás =

Hungarian footballer

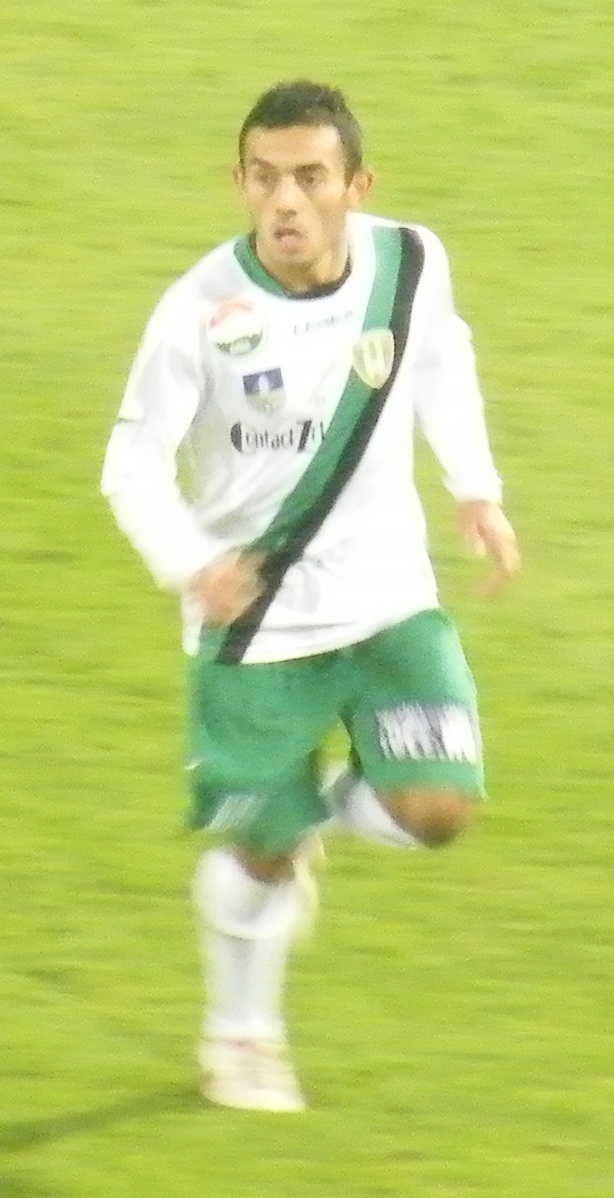
- Irhás Ignác in 2009

Personal information
- Full name: Ignác Irhás
- Date of birth: 18 March 1985 (age 41)
- Place of birth: Miskolc, Hungary
- Height: 1.69 m (5 ft 6 1/2 in)
- Position: Midfielder

Youth career
- 2003–2005: Bőcs

Senior career*
Years	Team	Apps	(Gls)
2005–2009	Bőcs	109	(18)
2009–2012	Haladás	51	(3)
2011–2012	→ Mezőkövesd (loan)	23	(3)
2012–2014	Mezőkövesd	9	(1)
2014	Kisvárda	14	(1)
2014–2016	Kazincbarcika		
2016–2018	Tállya		
2018–2019	Tiszafüred		
2019–	Bőcs		
- * Club domestic league appearances and goals as of 18 July 2023

Ignác Irhás (born 18 March 1985 in Miskolc) is a Hungarian football player who currently plays for Mezőkövesd-Zsóry SE.
