= Roland Mursits =

Hungarian footballer

Personal information
- Date of birth: 14 March 1991 (age 35)
- Place of birth: Szombathely, Hungary
- Height: 1.87 m (6 ft 1 1/2 in)
- Position: Goalkeeper

Team information
- Current team: Haladás
- Number: 1

Youth career
- 2003–2011: Haladás

Senior career*
Years	Team	Apps	(Gls)
2012–2015	Haladás	4	(0)
2015–2018	Békéscsaba	27	(0)
2017	→ Cegléd (loan)	18	(0)
2017–2018	→ Cegléd (loan)	35	(0)
2018–2019	Cegléd	36	(0)
2019–2022	Dorogi	71	(0)
2022–	Haladás	10	(0)

International career
2010–2012	Hungary U-19	9	(0)
2012	Hungary U-21	1	(0)
- * Club domestic league appearances and goals as of 31 May 2023

Roland Mursits (born 14 March 1991) is a Hungarian football player who plays for Haladás.

== Club career ==
In June 2022, Mursits returned to Haladás.
