= Szilárd Devecseri =

Hungarian footballer

Personal information
- Full name: Szilárd Devecseri
- Date of birth: 13 February 1990 (age 36)
- Place of birth: Szombathely, Hungary
- Height: 1.82 m (6 ft 0 in)
- Position: Centre-back

Youth career
- Haladás

Senior career*
Years	Team	Apps	(Gls)
2007–2018	Haladás	80	(1)
2015–2016	→ Mezőkövesd (loan)	31	(1)
2018–2020	Zalaegerszeg	61	(1)
2020–2023	Haladás	60	(1)

International career
2010–2011	Hungary U-21	1	(0)
2013	Hungary	3	(0)
- * Club domestic league appearances and goals as of 31 May 2023

Szilárd Devecseri (born 13 February 1990) is a Hungarian football player.

== Career statistics ==
Appearances and goals by club, season and competition
Club	Season	League			Cup		League Cup		Europe		Total	
Club	Season	Division	Apps	Goals	Apps	Goals	Apps	Goals	Apps	Goals	Apps	Goals
Szombathely
Szombathely	2007–08	Nemzeti Bajnokság II	1	0	0	0	—		—		1	0
Szombathely	2008–09	Nemzeti Bajnokság I	0	0	1	0	8	0	—		9	0
Szombathely	2009–10	Nemzeti Bajnokság I	0	0	2	0	5	0	—		7	0
Szombathely	2010–11	Nemzeti Bajnokság I	2	0	2	0	4	0	—		8	0
Szombathely	2011–12	Nemzeti Bajnokság I	2	0	1	0	4	0	—		7	0
Szombathely	2012–13	Nemzeti Bajnokság I	18	0	2	0	4	0	—		24	0
Szombathely	2013–14	Nemzeti Bajnokság I	19	0	3	0	2	0	—		24	0
Szombathely	2014–15	Nemzeti Bajnokság I	22	1	3	0	3	0	—		28	1
Szombathely	2015–16	Nemzeti Bajnokság I	0	0	1	0	—		—		28	1
Szombathely	2016–17	Nemzeti Bajnokság I	11	0	0	0	—		—		11	0
Szombathely	2017–18	Nemzeti Bajnokság I	5	0	0	0	—		—		5	0
Szombathely	Total		80	1	15	0	30	0	0	0	125	1
Mezőkövesd
Mezőkövesd	2015–16	Nemzeti Bajnokság II	18	1	1	0	—		—		19	1
Mezőkövesd	2016–17	Nemzeti Bajnokság I	13	0	3	0	—		—		16	0
Mezőkövesd	Total		31	1	4	0	0	0	0	0	35	1
Zalaegerszeg
Zalaegerszeg	2017–18	Nemzeti Bajnokság II	15	0	2	0	—		—		17	0
Zalaegerszeg	2018–19	Nemzeti Bajnokság II	37	0	0	0	—		—		37	0
Zalaegerszeg	2019–20	Nemzeti Bajnokság I	10	1	3	0	—		—		13	1
Zalaegerszeg	Total		62	1	5	0	0	0	0	0	67	1
Career total			173	3	24	0	30	0	0	0	227	3

Updated to games played as of 29 February 2020.
