= Attila Simon (footballer, born 1988) =

Hungarian footballer

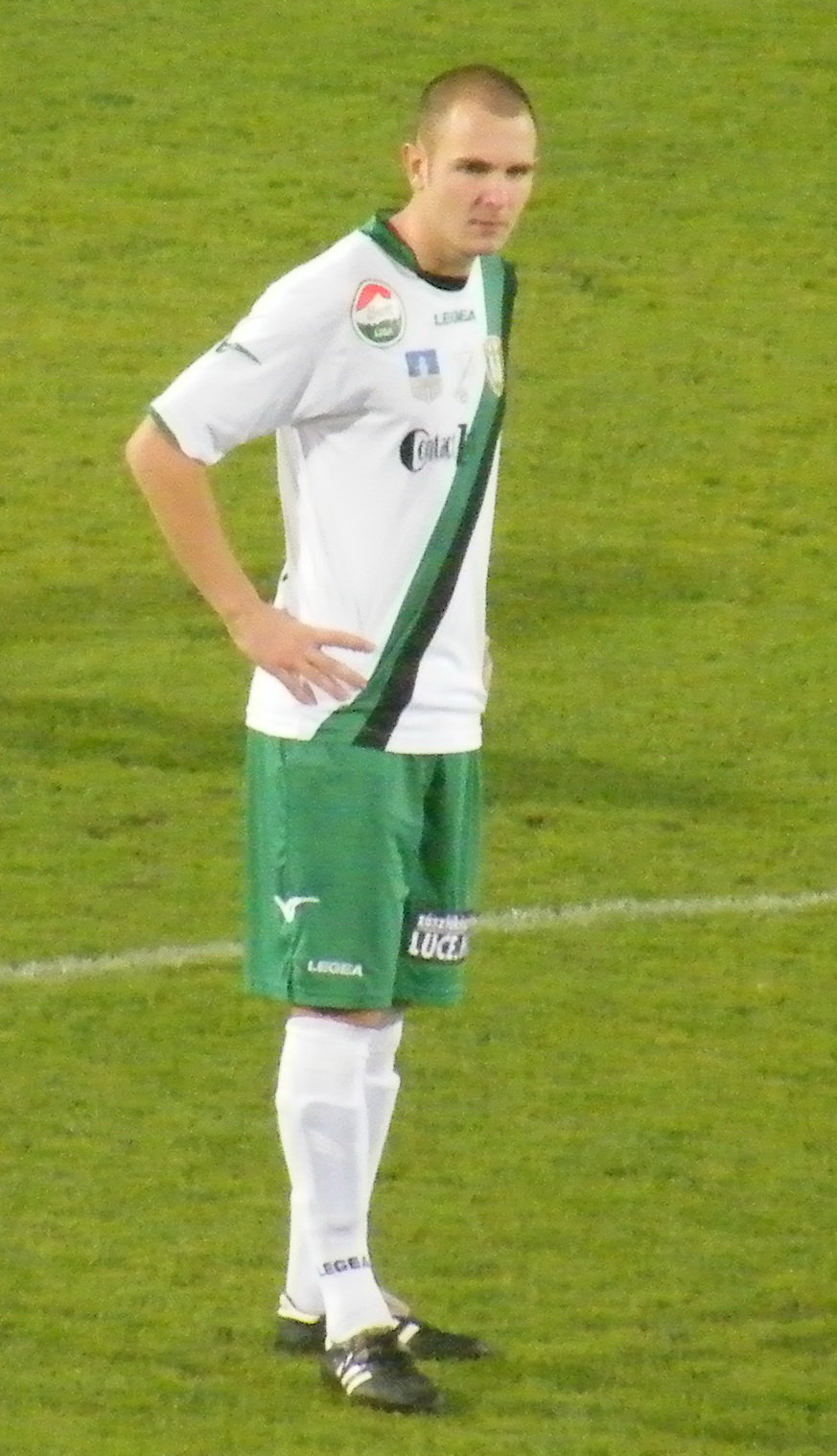

Personal information
- Full name: Attila Simon
- Date of birth: 23 September 1988 (age 38)
- Place of birth: Salgótarján, Hungary
- Height: 1.84 m (6 ft 0 in)
- Position: Striker

Team information
- Current team: Nyíregyháza Spartacus
- Number: 90

Senior career*
| Years | Team | Apps | (Gls) |
| 2006–2007 | MTK Hungária FC | 2 | (0) |
| 2007–2012 | Szombathelyi Haladás | 46 | (5) |
| 2012 | → Soproni VSE (loan) | 13 | (1) |
| 2012 | Nyíregyháza Spartacus | 10 | (0) |
| 2013– | Répcelaki SE | 0 | (0) |

International career
| 2006–2007 | Hungary U-19 | 2 | (0) |
- * Club domestic league appearances and goals as of 17 August 2012

Attila Simon (born 23 September 1988 in Salgótarján) is a Hungarian football player who currently plays for Répcelaki SE. He has a younger brother, András, who currently plays for Győri ETO.

== Honours ==
Nemzeti Bajnokság I:
Runner-up: 2007
Hungarian Second Division:
Winner: 2008
