= 2010–11 Rákospalotai EAC season =

Rákospalota
2010–11 season
- Owner: József Forgács
- Chairman: Róbert Kutasi
- Manager: János Mátyus
- Stadium: Budai II. László Stadion
- Nemzeti Bajnokság II (East): 10th
- Magyar Kupa: Round of 32
- Top goalscorer: League: Zsolt Szabó (6); All: Gergő Cseri (7)
- Highest home attendance: 700 (vs Ferencváros, 27 October 2010)
- Lowest home attendance: 100 (multiple league matches)
- Average home league attendance: 223
Home colours	Away colours

The 2010–11 season was Rákospalotai Egyetértés Atlétikai Club's or shortly REAC's 64th competitive season, 2nd consecutive season in the Nemzeti Bajnokság II and 98th year in existence as a football club. In addition to the domestic league, Rákospalota participated in this season's editions of the Magyar Kupa.

== First team squad ==
The players listed had league appearances and stayed until the end of the season.

Note: Flags indicate national team as defined under FIFA eligibility rules; some limited exceptions apply. Players may hold more than one non-FIFA nationality.

No.	Pos.	Nation	Player
1	GK	HUN	Csaba Somogyi
2	DF	HUN	Balázs Dinka
3	DF	HUN	Imre Hibó
4	DF	HUN	Máté Tóth
5	DF	HUN	János Birtalan (loaned from Ferencváros)
6	MF	HUN	Máté Gulyás
7	MF	HUN	Gergő Cseri
8	MF	HUN	Tamás Kiss
9	FW	HUN	János Olasz
10	FW	HUN	Gábor Torma
11	FW	HUN	Krisztián Nyerges
12	GK	HUN	Péter Tóth
13	DF	HUN	Dániel Ferenc

No.	Pos.	Nation	Player
14	MF	HUN	Balázs Kovács
15	MF	HUN	Roland Dancs
17	MF	HUN	Richárd Gamal
18	MF	HUN	Balázs Gáspár
19	MF	HUN	Márton Borsi
20	MF	HUN	Attila Menyhárt
22	FW	HUN	Zoltán Jovánczai
23	MF	HUN	Márk Bogdán
24	FW	HUN	Kornél Bubori
25	MF	HUN	Sándor Maczó
28	DF	HUN	Gergő Menyhért
29	MF	HUN	Márton Göntér
30	MF	HUN	Károly Illés

== Transfers ==
=== Transfers in ===
Date	Pos.	No.	Player	From	Ref
1 July 2010	GK	16	(Hungary) Gellért Vajda	Pomázi Focisuli SE	
4 August 2010	MF	19	(Hungary) Márton Borsi	Rákosmente	
4 August 2010	FW	24	(Hungary) Kornél Bubori	Cegléd	
4 August 2010	DF	13	(Hungary) Dániel Ferenc	Tatabánya	
4 August 2010	MF	20	(Hungary) Attila Menyhárt	Kecskemét	
4 August 2010	FW	9	(Hungary) János Olasz	MTK	
9 August 2010	DF	6	(Hungary) Máté Gulyás	Pécs	
9 August 2010	MF	23	(Hungary) Tamás Nagy	Vác	
26 August 2010	MF	–	(Hungary) Balázs Olay	MTK	
16 February 2011	FW	22	(Hungary) Zoltán Jovánczai	Free agent (Note: Previous club: Pápa.)	
24 February 2011	MF	23	(Hungary) Márk Bogdán	Újpest	
24 February 2011	DF	3	(Hungary) Imre Hibó	Újpest	
24 February 2011	MF	8	(Hungary) Tamás Kiss	Budaörs	
1 March 2011	DF	28	(Hungary) Gergő Menyhért	Kaposvölgye	

=== Transfers out ===
Date	Pos.	No.	Player	To	Ref
30 June 2010	DF	8	(Hungary) Vince Kapcsos	End of contract	
2 August 2010	MF	8	(Hungary) Tamás Kiss	Budaörs	
2 August 2010	MF	25	(Hungary) Attila Szili	Baja	
1 February 2011	MF	23	(Hungary) Tamás Nagy	(Austria) FC Sankt Andrä	
1 February 2011	DF	5	(Hungary) Balázs Sallai	Szigetszentmiklós	
21 February 2011	MF	21	(Hungary) Roland Lipcsei	Budaörs	

=== Loans in ===
Start date	End date	Pos.	No.	Player	From	Ref
25 August 2010	30 November 2010	DF	22	(Hungary) Márk Mészáros	Pápa	
25 August 2010	30 November 2010	FW	8	(Hungary) Zsolt Szabó	Pápa	
21 February 2011	End of season	DF	5	(Hungary) János Birtalan	Ferencváros	

=== Loans out ===
Start date	End date	Pos.	No.	Player	To	Ref

== Competitions ==
=== Overview ===
Competition	First match	Last match	Starting round	Final position	Record							
Competition	First match	Last match	Starting round	Final position	Pld	W	D	L	GF	GA	GD	Win %
Nemzeti Bajnokság II	15 August 2010	11 June 2011	Matchday 1	10th	30	9	6	15	30	38	−8	30.00
Magyar Kupa	18 August 2010	27 October 2010	Second round	Round of 32	3	2	0	1	6	5	+1	66.67
Total					33	11	6	16	36	43	−7	33.33

Source: Competitions

=== Nemzeti Bajnokság II ===
==== League table ====
Pos	Team	Pld	W	D	L	GF	GA	GD	Pts
8	Debrecen II	30	10	7	13	37	45	−8	37
9	Újpest II	30	9	8	13	43	58	−15	35
10	Rákospalota	30	9	6	15	30	38	−8	33
11	Kazincbarcika	30	8	8	14	37	60	−23	31 (Note: Kazincbarcika were docked 1 point.)
12	Cegléd	30	8	6	16	46	61	−15	30

Source: Soccerway
Rules for classification: 1) Points; 2) Matches won; 3) Goal difference; 4) Goals scored; 5) Head-to-head points; 6) Head-to-head goal difference; 7) Head-to-head away goals scored; 8) Fair play ranking; 9) Drawing of lots.

==== Results summary ====
Overall								Home						Away					
Pld	W	D	L	GF	GA	GD	Pts	W	D	L	GF	GA	GD	W	D	L	GF	GA	GD
30	9	6	15	30	38	−8	33	3	6	6	14	16	−2	6	0	9	16	22	−6

Source: HFF

==== Results by round ====
Round	1	2	3	4	5	6	7	8	9	10	11	12	13	14	15	16	17	18	19	20	21	22	23	24	25	26	27	28	29	30
Ground	H	A	H	A	H	A	H	A	H	A	H	A	H	H	A	A	H	A	H	A	H	A	H	A	H	A	H	A	A	H
Result	D	L	W	W	D	L	L	L	L	W	D	W	W	D	L	L	D	W	D	L	L	L	L	W	L	L	W	W	L	L
Position	8	15	10	6	7	10	13	13	14	12	13	10	8	8	10	11	11	8	9	11	11	11	13	10	11	11	10	9	10	10
Points	1	1	4	7	8	8	8	8	8	11	12	15	18	19	19	19	20	23	24	24	24	24	24	27	27	27	30	33	33	33

Source: Matches
A = Away; H = Home; W = Win; D = Draw; L = Loss

==== Score overview ====
Opposition	Home score	Away score	Aggregate score	Double
Békéscsaba	0–1	0–3	0–4	No
Bőcs	2–0	1–0	3–0	Yes
Cegléd	3–2	2–0	5–2	Yes
Debrecen II	0–0	1–0	1–0	No
Diósgyőr	2–2	0–3	2–5	No
Hajdúböszörmény	0–1	1–0	1–1	No
Kazincbarcika	0–1	4–2	4–3	No
Makó	0–1	2–3	2–4	No
Mezőkövesd	1–1	0–1	1–2	No
MTK II	2–4	0–1	2–5	No
Nyíregyháza	0–0	0–1	0–1	No
Orosháza	2–0	3–1	5–1	Yes
Újpest II	2–2	1–2	3–4	No
Vác	0–1	0–1	0–2	No
Vecsés	0–0	1–4	1–4	No

==== Matches ====
15 August 2010 1	Rákospalota	2–2	Diósgyőr	Budapest
19:00 CEST (UTC+2)	Menyhárt 21'; T. Nagy (yellow card) 38'; Gulyás 50'	Report	Lippai 39' (pen.); Roszel 69'	Stadium: Budai II. László Stadion; Attendance: 500; Referee: Zoltán Iványi

21 August 2010 2	Vecsés	4–1	Rákospalota	Vecsés
17:30 CEST (UTC+2)	K. Kiss 17', 56'; B. Lannert (yellow card) 30', (goal) 50'; T. Ponczok 46'	Report	Gulyás 21', (yellow card) 61'; D. Ferenc (yellow card) 56'; Sallai (yellow card) 74'	Stadium: Stadion Dózsa György út Attendance: 300; Referee: Viktor Kassai

29 August 2010 3	Rákospalota	2–0	Bőcs	Budapest
19:00 CEST (UTC+2)	Cseri 10'; D. Ferenc (yellow card) 11'; Z. Szabó (yellow card) 27', (goal) 82'	Report	Rubint (yellow card) 22'; Sipos (yellow card) 31'	Stadium: Budai II. László Stadion; Attendance: 200; Referee: Álvaro García Miquel

4 September 2010 4	Debrecen II	0–1	Rákospalota	Debrecen
16:30 CEST (UTC+2)		Report	Gulyás (yellow card) 20', (goal) 82'; T. Nagy (yellow card) 75'	Stadium: Dóczy József utcai Sportpálya; Attendance: 500; Referee: László Varga

14 September 2010 5	Rákospalota	0–0	Nyíregyháza	Budapest
18:00 CEST (UTC+2)	B. Kovács (yellow card) 32'; Mészáros (yellow card) 69'; Dinka (yellow card) 74'	Report	Andorka (yellow card) 62'; Batizi-Pócsi (yellow card) 83'; N. Szilágyi (yellow card) 88'	Stadium: Budai II. László Stadion; Attendance: 400; Referee: Viktor Kassai

19 September 2010 6	Makó	3–2	Rákospalota	Makó
16:00 CEST (UTC+2)	Z. Rakonczai (yellow card) 19'; R. Varga 35'; L. Schreiber 38'; T. Fülöp 55'; C. Puskás (red card) 80'	Report	Torma 12', 72'; Lipcsei (yellow card) 24'; Gulyás (yellow card) 30'	Stadium: Stadium Erdei Ferenc tér Attendance: 200; Referee: Roland Veizer

25 September 2010 7	Rákospalota	0–1	Vác	Budapest
18:00 CEST (UTC+2)	Gulyás (yellow card) 26'; Sallai (yellow card) 79'	Report	Rob 4'	Stadium: Budai II. László Stadion; Attendance: 300; Referee: József Erdős

2 October 2010 8	MTK II	1–0	Rákospalota	Budapest
15:00 CEST (UTC+2)	Kelemen (yellow card) 39'; Eppel 62'	Report	Cseri (yellow card) 12'; Sallai (yellow card) 74'; Dancs (yellow card) 77'; Somogyi (yellow card) 90'	Stadium: Promontor utcai Stadion; Attendance: 50; Referee: Balázs Böcskei

9 October 2010 9	Rákospalota	0–1	Kazincbarcika	Budapest
17:00 CEST (UTC+2)	Gulyás (yellow card) 19'; Z. Szabó (red card) 29'; B. Kovács (yellow card) 34'; Mészáros (yellow card) 72'; Cseri (yellow card) 83'	Report	Stevica 17'; B. Fehér (yellow card) 27'	Stadium: Budai II. László Stadion; Attendance: 100; Referee: Zoltán J. Kovács

16 October 2010 10	Hajdúböszörmény	0–1	Rákospalota	Hajdúböszörmény
14:30 CEST (UTC+2)	C. Giura (red card) 52'; K. Szilágyi (yellow card) 67'	Report	Cseri 68' (pen.); J. Olasz (red card) 81'; M. Tóth (red card) 88'; Dancs (yellow card) 90+4'	Stadium: Városi Stadion; Attendance: 200; Referee: Ádám Farkas

23 October 2010 11	Rákospalota	1–1	Mezőkövesd	Budapest
16:00 CEST (UTC+2)	B. Kovács (yellow card) 19'; Dancs 21', (yellow card) 72'; R. Gamal (yellow card) 64'; Mészáros (yellow card) 82'	Report	N. Kaszás (yellow card) 17'; S. Sivák (yellow card) 17', (goal) 33'	Stadium: Budai II. László Stadion; Attendance: 150; Referee: Sándor Andó-Szabó

30 October 2010 12	Cegléd	0–2	Rákospalota	Cegléd
14:30 CEST (UTC+2)	D. Juhász (yellow card) 24'; L. Nagy (yellow card) 39'; G. Villányi (yellow card) 45'; S. Rebecsák (yellow card) 54'; L. Szabó (yellow card) 68'	Report	Z. Szabó 35', 70'; D. Ferenc (yellow card) 66'	Stadium: Malomtó széli stadion Attendance: 150; Referee: János Takács

6 November 2010 13	Rákospalota	2–0	Orosháza	Budapest
16:00 CET (UTC+1)	Z. Szabó 24', 53'; Menyhárt (yellow card) 25'; Nyerges (yellow card) 89'	Report	I. Kerekes (yellow card) 6'; Futaki (yellow card) 19'; N. Szabó (yellow card) 60'; C. Kerepeczki (yellow card) 77'	Stadium: Budai II. László Stadion; Attendance: 200; Referee: Álvaro García Miquel

13 November 2010 14	Rákospalota	2–2	Újpest II	Budapest
16:00 CET (UTC+1)	Nyerges 16'; Menyhárt (yellow card) 50'; Z. Szabó 85'	Report	Lázár 11', (yellow card) 80'; B. Banai (yellow card) 12'; Balogh 27'; Á. Privigyei (yellow card) 63'; B. Szabó (red card) 72'; Szalai (red card) 83'; Esterházy (yellow card) 90+2'	Stadium: Budai II. László Stadion; Attendance: 100; Referee: Balázs Böcskei

20 November 2010 15	Békéscsaba	3–0	Rákospalota	Békéscsaba
14:00 CET (UTC+1)	Z. Csiszár (yellow card) 20', (goal) 86'; Oláh (yellow card) 39'; Pozsár 45'; P. Berki 74'	Report	B. Kovács (yellow card) 11'; Menyhárt (yellow card) 30'; Gulyás (yellow card) 61'; Lipcsei (red card) 86'	Stadium: Kórház utcai Stadion; Attendance: 200; Referee: József Berger

5 March 2011 16	Diósgyőr	3–0	Rákospalota	Miskolc
17:00 CET (UTC+1)	Menougong 30'; Granát (yellow card) 45', (goal) 48', 50'; Gal (yellow card) 75'	Report	M. Tóth (yellow card) 53'; I. Hibó (red card) 67'; Jovánczai (yellow card) 75'	Stadium: Diósgyőri Stadion; Attendance: 2,200; Referee: Roland Veizer

13 March 2011 17	Rákospalota	0–0	Vecsés	Budapest
15:00 CET (UTC+1)	B. Kovács (yellow card) 69'; Menyhért (yellow card) 70'	Report	Fritz (yellow card) 42'	Stadium: Budai II. László Stadion; Attendance: 300; Referee: László Varga

19 March 2011 18	Bőcs	0–1	Rákospalota	Mezőkövesd
15:00 CET (UTC+1)	Z. Molnár (yellow card) 7'; B. Bakos (yellow card) 32'	Report	T. Kiss 17'; Gulyás (yellow card) 24'; M. Bogdán (yellow card) 32'; Jovánczai (yellow card) 52'; Dancs (yellow card) 79'	Stadium: Régi Mezőkövesdi Városi Stadion; Attendance: 100; Referee: Gergely Szőts

26 March 2011 19	Rákospalota	0–0	Debrecen II	Budapest
15:00 CET (UTC+1)	Jovánczai (yellow card) 12'; T. Kiss (yellow card) 46'; D. Ferenc (yellow card) 75'; M. Tóth (yellow card) 86'	Report	Ludánszki (yellow card) 50'; Z. Nagy (yellow card) 76'	Stadium: Budai II. László Stadion; Attendance: 150; Referee: Dániel Becséri

2 April 2011 20	Nyíregyháza	1–0	Rákospalota	Nyíregyháza
13:00 CEST (UTC+2)	Germán 19'; Abdelali (yellow card) 46'; Kovačević (yellow card) 76'; Pákolicz (yellow card) 76'; A. P. Pérez (yellow card) 82'	Report	D. Ferenc (yellow card) 11'; Jovánczai (yellow card) 47'	Stadium: Városi Stadion; Attendance: 1,100; Referee: Ádám Farkas

10 April 2011 21	Rákospalota	0–1	Makó	Budapest
17:00 CEST (UTC+2)	Nyerges (yellow card) 37'; I. Hibó (yellow card) 50'; Jovánczai (yellow card) 52'; M. Bogdán (yellow card) 66'; B. Kovács (red card) 89'	Report	R. Varga (yellow card) 30'; G. Magyar (yellow card) 49'; B. Faragó 78'	Stadium: Budai II. László Stadion; Attendance: 200; Referee: Álvaro García Miquel

16 April 2011 22	Vác	1–0	Rákospalota	Vác
17:00 CEST (UTC+2)	G. Tányéros (yellow card) 39'; V. Michel 50'	Report	Cseri (yellow card) 10'; Menyhért (yellow card) 28'	Stadium: Ligeti Stadion; Attendance: 250; Referee: Zsolt Szabó

24 April 2011 23	Rákospalota	2–4	MTK II	Budapest
18:00 CEST (UTC+2)	Cseri 3', 64'; Jovánczai (red card) 43'; Gulyás (yellow card) 71'; Menyhárt (yellow card) 80'; Dancs (yellow card) 88'	Report	Pölöskei 15'; Á. Szentgyörgyi 45'; Gál (yellow card) 60'; Kornis 69'; D. Kákonyi (yellow card) 69', (goal) 74'; B. Szurkos (yellow card) 83'	Stadium: Budai II. László Stadion; Attendance: 100; Referee: István Mészáros

30 April 2011 24	Kazincbarcika	2–4	Rákospalota	Kazincbarcika
17:00 CEST (UTC+2)	P. Kovács (yellow card) 34', (goal) 65', 78'; Müller (yellow card) 61'; B. Fehér (yellow card) 69'; Á. Mező (yellow card) 77'; Z. Hamar (red card) 81'; K. Orlóczki (red card) 83'; V. Vasas (yellow card) 90+1'	Report	T. Kiss 22'; Á. Mező 37' (o.g.); Cseri 40'; Nyerges 55' (pen.); I. Hibó (yellow card) 72'; Gulyás (red card) 81'; J. Olasz (yellow card) 84'	Stadium: Pete András Stadion; Attendance: 200; Referee: Roland Veizer

8 May 2011 25	Rákospalota	0–1	Hajdúböszörmény	Budapest
18:00 CEST (UTC+2)	T. Kiss (yellow card) 63'	Report	L. Kiss (yellow card) 31'; D. Nagy (yellow card) 40'; Bogdanović 63', (red card) 80'; A. Bellon (yellow card) 88'	Stadium: Budai II. László Stadion; Attendance: 150; Referee: Gábor Barna

15 May 2011 26	Mezőkövesd	1–0	Rákospalota	Mezőkövesd
17:30 CEST (UTC+2)	Vámosi (yellow card) 31'; P. Husanik (yellow card) 34'; Lakatos (yellow card) 68'; V. Szabó 80'	Report	Dancs (yellow card) 8'	Stadium: Régi Mezőkövesdi Városi Stadion; Attendance: 800; Referee: Gábor Oláh

22 May 2011 27	Rákospalota	3–2	Cegléd	Budapest
18:00 CEST (UTC+2)	Jovánczai (yellow card) 6', (goal) 58'; Menyhárt 36'; B. Kovács (red card) 72'; Menyhért 81'; Gulyás (yellow card) 90+2'	Report	Odrobéna (yellow card) 9'; T. Nagy (yellow card) 14'; V. Buzás (yellow card) 41'; L. Nagy 61'; Balog 77'; L. Szabó (yellow card) 88'	Stadium: Budai II. László Stadion; Attendance: 200; Referee: Ádám Farkas

28 May 2011 28	Orosháza	1–3	Rákospalota	Orosháza
18:00 CEST (UTC+2)	Ranđelović 20'; N. Szabó (yellow card) 65'	Report	Nyerges 11' (pen.), 51'; Futaki 55' (o.g.); Somogyi (yellow card) 68'; M. Tóth (yellow card) 76'; Gulyás (yellow card) 89'; Dancs (red card) 90+2'	Stadium: Mátrai- Stadion; Attendance: 400; Referee: Gergely Szőts

3 June 2011 29	Újpest II	2–1	Rákospalota	Budapest
16:00 CEST (UTC+2)	B. Szabó 12', (yellow card) 26'; Popovics 35' (pen.); Á. Privigyei (yellow card) 47'; J. Nagy (yellow card) 73'	Report	B. Gáspár 43'; Menyhért (yellow card) 71'	Stadium: Promontor utcai Stadion; Attendance: 100; Referee: Róbert Nagy

11 June 2011 30	Rákospalota	0–1	Békéscsaba	Budapest
18:00 CEST (UTC+2)	I. Hibó (yellow card) 15'; J. Birtalan (yellow card) 26'; Cseri (yellow card) 62'	Report	Z. Csiszár 9', (yellow card) 27'	Stadium: Budai II. László Stadion; Attendance: 300; Referee: Tibor II Gyarmati

=== Magyar Kupa ===
18 August 2010 Second round	Dunaújváros	0–3	Rákospalota	Dunaújváros
16:30 CEST (UTC+2)	Sztanó (yellow card) 50'; G. Szabó (red card) 52'; T. Bartha (yellow card) 54'; Kóczián (yellow card) 60'; Balaskó (yellow card) 67'	Report	Cseri 10', 81'; B. Gáspár (yellow card) 23'; M. Tóth (yellow card) 27'; J. Olasz 43'; D. Ferenc (yellow card) 48'	Stadium: Dunaújvárosi Stadion; Referee: Balázs Berke

22 September 2010 Third round	Rákospalota	3–0	Szigetszentmiklós	Budapest
15:30 CEST (UTC+2)	J. Olasz (yellow card) 42', (goal) 43', 86'; Gulyás (yellow card) 57'; M. Borsi 90'	Report	M. Rédei (yellow card) 22'; G. Szamosszegi (yellow card) 25'; Kincses (yellow card) 44'; Pintér (yellow card) 49'	Stadium: Budai II. László Stadion; Attendance: 303; Referee: Sándor Andó-Szabó

27 October 2010 Round of 32	Rákospalota	0–5	Ferencváros	Budapest
18:00 CEST (UTC+2)	Gulyás (yellow card) 14'	Report	Morales 21'; Rósa 29'; Miljković 38', 55'; Józsi 61'	Stadium: Budai II. László Stadion; Attendance: 700; Referee: Gábor Oláh

== Statistics ==
=== Overall ===
Appearances (Apps) numbers are for appearances in competitive games only, including sub appearances.
Source: Competitions

No.	Player	Pos.	Nemzeti Bajnokság II				Magyar Kupa				Total			
No.	Player	Pos.	Apps	Goal	Booked	Sent off (straight red)	Apps	Goal	Booked	Sent off (straight red)	Apps	Goal	Booked	Sent off (straight red)
1	(Hungary) Csaba Somogyi	GK	29		2		2				31		2	
2	(Hungary) Balázs Dinka	DF	21		1		3				24		1	
3	(Hungary) Imre Hibó	DF	11		3	1					11		3	1
4	(Hungary) Máté Tóth	DF	19		3	1	3		1		22		4	1
5	(Hungary) János Birtalan	DF	7		1						7		1	
5	(Hungary) Balázs Sallai	DF	8		3		2				10		3	
6	(Hungary) Máté Gulyás	MF	27	3	10	1	2		2		29	3	12	1
7	(Hungary) Gergő Cseri	MF	29	5	4		3	2			32	7	4	
8	(Hungary) Tamás Kiss	MF	15	2	2						15	2	2	
8	(Hungary) Zsolt Szabó	FW	10	6	1	1	2				12	6	1	1
9	(Hungary) János Olasz	FW	12		1	1	3	3	1		15	3	2	1
10	(Hungary) Gábor Torma	FW	7	2			1				8	2		
11	(Hungary) Krisztián Nyerges	FW	23	4	2		1				24	4	2	
12	(Hungary) Péter Tóth	GK	1				1				2			
13	(Hungary) Dániel Ferenc	DF	19		5		2		1		21		6	
14	(Hungary) Balázs Kovács	MF	24		5	2	1				25		5	2
15	(Hungary) Roland Dancs	MF	24	1	6	1	2				26	1	6	1
16	(Hungary) Gellért Vajda	GK												
17	(Hungary) Richárd Gamal	MF	6		1						6		1	
18	(Hungary) Balázs Gáspár	MF	15	1			2		1		17	1	1	
19	(Hungary) Márton Borsi	MF	11				2	1			13	1		
20	(Hungary) Attila Menyhárt	MF	30	2	4		3				33	2	4	
21	(Hungary) Roland Lipcsei	MF	7		1	1	2				9		1	1
22	(Hungary) Zoltán Jovánczai	FW	12	1	6	1					12	1	6	1
22	(Hungary) Márk Mészáros	DF	9		3		2				11		3	
23	(Hungary) Márk Bogdán	MF	9		2						9		2	
23	(Hungary) Tamás Nagy	MF	7		2		1				8		2	
24	(Hungary) Kornél Bubori	FW	6								6			
25	(Hungary) Sándor Maczó	MF	2				2				4			
27	(Hungary) Bence Bacskai	FW												
28	(Hungary) Gergő Menyhért	DF	12	1	3						12	1	3	
29	(Hungary) Márton Göntér	MF	1								1			
30	(Hungary) Károly Illés	MF	2								2			
Own goals				2								2		
Totals				30	71	10		6	6			36	77	10

=== Clean sheets ===
			Clean sheets		
No.	Player	Games Played	Nemzeti Bajnokság II	Magyar Kupa	Total
1	(Hungary) Csaba Somogyi	31	9	1	10
12	(Hungary) Péter Tóth	2	0	1	1
16	(Hungary) Gellért Vajda	0			0
Totals			9	2	11
