= 2008–09 Szombathelyi Haladás season =

Haladás
2008–09 season
- Manager: Aurél Csertői
- Stadium: Rohonci út (Home stadium); Illés Akadémia (Note: The match against Siófok in the Ligakupa was played at the Illés Akadémia in Szombathely, instead of Haladás regular stadium, the Rohonci út.) (Temporary stadium)
- Nemzeti Bajnokság I: 3rd
- Magyar Kupa: Round of 16
- Ligakupa: Quarter-finals
- Highest home attendance: 12,500 v Zalaegerszeg (30 May 2009, Nemzeti Bajnokság I)
- Lowest home attendance: 200 v Siófok (7 February 2009, Ligakupa)
- Average home league attendance: 6,700
- Biggest win: 5–0 v Siófok (Home, 22 August 2008, Nemzeti Bajnokság I)
- Biggest defeat: 0–4 v Győr (Away, 1 October 2008, Ligakupa); 0–4 v Győr (Away, 22 October 2008, Magyar Kupa)

The 2008–09 season was Szombathelyi Haladás's 52nd competitive season, 91st season in existence as a football club and first season in the Nemzeti Bajnokság I after winning the West group of the second division in the previous season. In addition to the domestic league, Haladás participated in that season's editions of the Magyar Kupa and the Ligakupa.

== Squad ==
Squad at end of season

Note: Flags indicate national team as defined under FIFA eligibility rules; some limited exceptions apply. Players may hold more than one non-FIFA nationality.

No.	Pos.	Nation	Player
1	GK	HUN	Tamás Szép
2	MF	HUN	Zoltán Csontos
4	MF	HUN	Gábor Rajos
5	MF	BRA	Thiago Maikel
6	DF	HUN	Dániel Lengyel
9	FW	HUN	Márton Oross
10	FW	HUN	Péter Andorka
11	DF	HUN	Bence Iszlai
12	DF	HUN	Szilárd Devecseri
13	DF	HUN	Péter Balassa
14	MF	HUN	Péter Vörös
15	DF	HUN	Péter Tóth
16	FW	HUN	Máté Skriba
17	FW	HUN	Attila Simon

No.	Pos.	Nation	Player
18	MF	HUN	Norbert Sipos
19	FW	HUN	Krisztián Kenesei
20	MF	HUN	Norbert Tóth
21	MF	HUN	Balázs Molnár
22	DF	HUN	Richárd Guzmics
23	MF	HUN	Szabolcs Schimmer
25	FW	HUN	Péter Bonifert
26	DF	HUN	Zsolt Kovács
30	GK	HUN	Gergő Gőcze
32	FW	HUN	Ferenc Rácz
46	MF	HUN	Ádám Simon
66	GK	HUN	Dániel Rózsa
77	DF	HUN	Attila Kuttor
—	MF	HUN	István Kovács

== Competitions ==
=== Overview ===
Competition	First match	Last match	Starting round	Final position	Record							
Competition	First match	Last match	Starting round	Final position	Pld	W	D	L	GF	GA	GD	Win %
Nemzeti Bajnokság I	26 July 2008	30 May 2009	Matchday 1	3rd	30	16	5	9	44	29	+15	53.33
Magyar Kupa	3 September 2008	22 October 2008	Third round	Round of 16	4	3	0	1	6	7	−1	75.00
Ligakupa	1 October 2008	17 March 2009	Group stage	Quarter-finals	12	7	1	4	26	17	+9	58.33
Total					46	26	6	14	76	53	+23	56.52

Source: Competitions

=== Nemzeti Bajnokság I ===
==== League table ====
Pos	Team	Pld	W	D	L	GF	GA	GD	Pts	Qualification or relegation
1	Debrecen (C)	30	21	5	4	70	29	+41	68	Qualification for Champions League second qualifying round
2	Újpest	30	17	8	5	61	38	+23	59	Qualification for Europa League second qualifying round
3	Haladás	30	16	5	9	44	29	+15	53	Qualification for Europa League first qualifying round
4	Zalaegerszeg	30	15	7	8	52	44	+8	52	
5	Kecskemét	30	14	6	10	55	44	+11	48	

Source: soccerway.com
Rules for classification: 1st points; 2nd overall wins; 3rd goal difference; 4th goals scored
(C) Champions

==== Results summary ====
Overall								Home						Away					
Pld	W	D	L	GF	GA	GD	Pts	W	D	L	GF	GA	GD	W	D	L	GF	GA	GD
30	16	5	9	44	29	+15	53	9	2	4	22	11	+11	7	3	5	22	18	+4

Source: Hungarian Football Federation

==== Results by round ====
Round	1	2	3	4	5	6	7	8	9	10	11	12	13	14	15	16	17	18	19	20	21	22	23	24	25	26	27	28	29	30
Ground	H	A	H	A	H	H	A	H	A	H	A	H	A	H	A	A	H	A	H	A	A	H	A	H	A	H	A	H	A	H
Result	W	L	W	L	W	W	D	W	W	D	W	D	L	L	L	D	W	W	L	W	D	L	L	W	W	W	W	W	W	L
Position	4	6	2	7	5	3	4	3	2	3	3	4	4	4	4	4	4	4	4	3	3	4	4	4	4	3	3	3	3	3
Points	3	3	6	6	9	12	13	16	19	20	23	24	24	24	24	25	28	31	31	34	35	35	35	38	41	44	47	50	53	53

Source: Matches
A = Away; H = Home; W = Win; D = Draw; L = Loss

==== Matches ====
26 July 2008 1	Haladás	2–1	Győr	Szombathely
20:00 CEST (UTC+2)	Rajos (yellow card) 30'; P. Tóth I 42'; Kuttor 45'; B. Molnár (yellow card) 49'	Report	Šupić (yellow card) 41'; Bicák 50'; Bajzát (yellow card) 65'; Zo. Kovács II (yellow card) 67'	Stadium: Rohonci út Attendance: 6,500; Referee: Ferenc Bede; Assistant referees: Balázs Farkas, Zoltán Szalai; Fourth official: Gábor Oláh

2 August 2008 2	Fehérvár	1–0	Haladás	Székesfehérvár
20:00 CET (UTC+1)	Romero 24'; G. Horváth II (yellow card) 30'; Dvéri (yellow card) 72'; Csobánki (yellow card) 87'	Report	B. Molnár (yellow card) 42'; Rajos (yellow card) 48'; Schimmer (yellow card) 57'; Kenesei (yellow card) 70'	Stadium: Sóstói Stadion; Attendance: 3,000; Referee: Ádám Németh; Assistant referees: Szabolcs Deutsch, Arnold Kepe; Fourth official: Norbert Kiss

9 August 2008 3	Haladás	3–0	Nyíregyháza	Szombathely
20:00 CEST (UTC+2)	Oross 39'; Rajos 41', 50'	Report	Lippai (yellow card) 24'; Miskolczi (yellow card) 73'	Stadium: Rohonci út Attendance: 6,000; Referee: Szabolcs Szilasi; Assistant referees: Oszkár Lémon, István Iványi; Fourth official: Dávid Ákos

15 August 2008 4	Újpest	1–0	Haladás	Budapest
19:00 CEST (UTC+2)	Rajczi 9'; Dudić (yellow card) 24'; Lipták (yellow card) 32'; Vaskó (yellow card) 90'	Report	Rajos (yellow card) 8'; A. Simon II (yellow card) 81'; Kuttor (yellow card) 86'	Stadium: Szusza Ferenc Stadion; Attendance: 3,424; Referee: Zoltán Iványi; Assistant referees: István Albert, János Medovarszki; Fourth official: Tibor Csatári

22 August 2008 5	Haladás	5–0	Siófok	Szombathely
20:00 CEST (UTC+2)	Guzmics 21'; Rajos 26'; Kenesei 48' (pen.), 73'; Oross 56'	Report	Basara (yellow card) 38'; Mogyorósi (yellow card) 48'; Forgács (yellow card) 51'	Stadium: Rohonci út Attendance: 7,000; Referee: Sándor Andó-Szabó; Assistant referees: Róbert Kispál, Balázs Farkas; Fourth official: Csaba Molnár

30 August 2008 6	Haladás	1–0	Vasas	Szombathely
20:00 CEST (UTC+2)	Rajos 34'	Report	Balog (yellow card) 69'	Stadium: Rohonci út Attendance: 8,000; Referee: Tamás Arany; Assistant referees: Zsolt Márton, István Iványi; Fourth official: Balázs Böcskei

12 September 2008 7	Debrecen	2–2	Haladás	Debrecen
19:00 CEST (UTC+2)	Rudolf 18', (yellow card) 49'; N. Mészáros (yellow card) 53'; Bíró (red card) 59'; Oláh 80'; Leandro (yellow card) 90+2'	Report	P. Tóth I 59'; Z. Takács 86' (o.g.); Zs. Kovács (yellow card) 90+2'	Stadium: Oláh Gábor utcai Stadion; Attendance: 4,500; Referee: Ferenc Bede; Assistant referees: Zsolt Butkai, Zoltán Szalai; Fourth official: János Takács

20 September 2008 8	Haladás	3–1	Kecskemét	Szombathely
19:00 CEST (UTC+2)	Rajos 15'; Guzmics (yellow card) 29'; P. Tóth I 35', (yellow card) 56'; Kenesei 61'	Report	I. Farkas (yellow card) 43'; Koncz 68'; Menyhárt (yellow card) 79'	Stadium: Rohonci út Attendance: 6,000; Referee: Gergely Sulyok; Assistant referees: Vencel Tóth II, György Ring; Fourth official: Gergely Szőts

28 September 2008 9	Rákospalota	1–2	Haladás	Budapest
19:00 CEST (UTC+2)	Szántai (yellow card) 27'; Rása (yellow card) 29'; Torma 62'	Report	Kenesei 28' (pen.); Vörös 54'	Stadium: Budai II. László Stadion; Attendance: 600; Referee: Szabolcs Szilasi; Assistant referees: Zsolt Márton, Gábor Kormányos II; Fourth official: Gábor Fajkusz

4 October 2008 10	Haladás	1–1	Kaposvár	Szombathely
18:00 CEST (UTC+2)	Oross 27'; P. Tóth I (yellow card) 86'; N. Tóth (yellow card) 90+3'	Report	Grúz (yellow card) 50'; Kovácsevics (yellow card) 55'; Zahorecz (yellow card) 63', (goal) 86' (pen.)	Stadium: Rohonci út Attendance: 6,500; Referee: Sándor Andó-Szabó; Assistant referees: Oszkár Lémon, Gábor Takács; Fourth official: Gábor Oláh

18 October 2008 11	Honvéd	0–1	Haladás	Budapest
15:00 CEST (UTC+2)	Genito (yellow card) 44'	Report	N. Sipos 63'	Stadium: Bozsik József Stadion; Attendance: 1,200; Referee: József Berger; Assistant referees: Dr. Péter Hegyi, Attila Forgács; Fourth official: Ferenc Szöllősi

25 October 2008 12	Haladás	0–0	MTK	Szombathely
17:00 CEST (UTC+2)	Oross (yellow card) 53'; P. Tóth I (red card) 89'	Report	Lencse (yellow card) 83'; Zsidai (yellow card) 88'	Stadium: Rohonci út Attendance: 6,000; Referee: Zsolt Szabó; Assistant referees: Róbert Kispál, Imre Attila Nagy; Fourth official: Gergely Szőts

1 November 2008 13	Diósgyőr	1–0	Haladás	Miskolc
18:00 CET (UTC+1)	Kamber 25'; P. Takács (yellow card) 26'; Miličić (yellow card) 73'; Búrány (yellow card) 85'	Report	B. Molnár (yellow card) 5'; Vörös (yellow card) 35'; Rajos (yellow card) 62'; Kuttor (red card) 82'; N. Tóth (yellow card) 87'; N. Sipos (yellow card) 90+1'	Stadium: Diósgyőri Stadion; Attendance: 2,500; Referee: János Takács; Assistant referees: Lajos L. Tóth, Péter Berettyán; Fourth official: Gábor Bendik

8 November 2008 14	Haladás	0–1	Paks	Szombathely
18:00 CET (UTC+1)	B. Molnár (yellow card) 81'	Report	Tököli 4', (yellow card) 75'; Heffler (yellow card) 18'; Pandur (yellow card) 35'	Stadium: Rohonci út Attendance: 5,500; Referee: Gergely Sulyok; Assistant referees: Vencel Tóth II, Arnold Kepe; Fourth official: Balázs Berke

15 November 2008 15	Zalaegerszeg	3–2	Haladás	Zalaegerszeg
18:00 CET (UTC+1)	Méyé 28'; Waltner 32' (pen.); P. Máté I (yellow card) 53'; Z. Tóth I 87', (yellow card) 87'	Report	Schimmer (yellow card) 45'; Oross (yellow card) 53'; Andorka 76'; Rajos 80'	Stadium: ZTE Arena; Attendance: 8,857; Referee: Péter Solymosi; Assistant referees: Oszkár Lémon, István Iványi; Fourth official: Dávid Ákos

7 March 2009 18	Nyíregyháza	0–2	Haladás	Nyíregyháza
18:00 CET (UTC+1)	Perenyi (yellow card) 43'; Goia (red card) 75'; Mboussi (red card) 90+2'	Report	N. Sipos 53'; Kenesei 76' (pen.); Andorka (yellow card) 86'	Stadium: Városi Stadion; Attendance: 2,000; Referee: Viktor Kassai; Assistant referees: Gábor Erős, Tibor Vámos; Fourth official: Gergely Szőts

13 March 2009 19	Haladás	0–2	Újpest	Szombathely
19:00 CET (UTC+1)	P. Tóth I (yellow card) 55'; N. Sipos (yellow card) 83'	Report	Tisza 8'; Bori (yellow card) 20'; Kéthévoama 58'; Mijadinoski (yellow card) 61'; Simek (red card) 87'	Stadium: Rohonci út Attendance: 7,000; Referee: Zsolt Szabó; Assistant referees: György Ring, Vencel Tóth II; Fourth official: József Erdős

21 March 2009 20	Siófok	0–1	Haladás	Siófok
18:00 CET (UTC+1)	G. Horváth I (yellow card) 30'; L. Nagy (yellow card) 41'; G. Hegedűs (yellow card) 68'; Ndjodo (yellow card) 78'	Report	B. Molnár (yellow card) 34'; Vörös 90+2'	Stadium: Révész Géza utcai Stadion; Attendance: 500; Referee: Szabolcs Szilasi; Assistant referees: Oszkár Lémon, István Iványi; Fourth official: Dávid Ákos

5 April 2009 21	Vasas	1–1	Haladás	Budapest
17:30 CEST (UTC+2)	Dobrić (yellow card) 13'; Somorjai (yellow card) 33'; Paripović (red card) 40'; Unierzyski (yellow card) 58'; Vukelja 71'	Report	Kenesei 41'; Zs. Kovács (yellow card) 45'; N. Sipos (yellow card) 53'; N. Tóth (yellow card) 77'	Stadium: Illovszky Rudolf Stadion; Attendance: 2,000; Referee: István Mészáros; Assistant referees: Zsolt Szpisják, János Medovarszki; Fourth official: Balázs Böcskei

11 April 2009 22	Haladás	1–2	Debrecen	Szombathely
15:00 CEST (UTC+2)	Kenesei 60'; B. Molnár (yellow card) 83'	Report	Czvitkovics 32', 64' (pen.); Komlósi (yellow card) 75'	Stadium: Rohonci út Attendance: 7,000; Referee: Péter Solymosi; Assistant referees: Oszkár Lémon, Gábor Takács; Fourth official: Dávid Ákos

18 April 2009 23	Kecskemét	3–2	Haladás	Kecskemét
20:00 CEST (UTC+2)	Csordás 39' (pen.), 77'; Čukić (yellow card) 75'; Némedi 81'	Report	Mitrović 13' (o.g.); Oross 72'	Stadium: Széktói Stadion; Attendance: 4,000; Referee: Tamás Arany; Assistant referees: László Viszokai, Dr. Péter Kovács; Fourth official: Dániel Becséri

25 April 2009 24	Haladás	1–0	Rákospalota	Szombathely
19:00 CEST (UTC+2)	Rajos 21'; Kuttor (yellow card) 30'	Report	Ambrusz (yellow card) 21'; Sallai (yellow card) 25'; Zo. Kovács II (yellow card) 30'; Pomper (yellow card) 77'; Z. Pintér (yellow card) 79'	Stadium: Rohonci út Attendance: 4,000; Referee: Sándor Andó-Szabó; Assistant referees: Zsolt Butkai, Arnold Kepe; Fourth official: Norbert Kiss

28 April 2009 25	Kaposvár	2–3	Haladás	Kaposvár
19:00 CEST (UTC+2)	Nikolić (yellow card) 52', (goal) 56'; Pest (yellow card) 65'; Zahorecz 71'	Report	Schimmer (yellow card) 32'; Rajos (yellow card) 34'; N. Sipos (yellow card) 54'; Kenesei 60', 65'; Iszlai (yellow card) 71'; Oross 88'	Stadium: Rákóczi Stadion; Attendance: 2,000; Referee: Roland Veizer; Assistant referees: Péter Berettyán, Róbert Horváth; Fourth official: László Varga

1 May 2009 26	Haladás	1–0	Honvéd	Szombathely
19:00 CEST (UTC+2)	Kenesei 40'; Vörös (yellow card) 80'	Report	Debreceni (yellow card) 37'; Vólent (yellow card) 76'; Vukmir (yellow card) 77'	Stadium: Rohonci út Attendance: 6,500; Referee: Viktor Kassai; Assistant referees: Gábor Erős, Tibor Vámos; Fourth official: József Erdős

5 May 2009 17	Haladás	2–1	Fehérvár	Szombathely
19:00 CEST (UTC+2)	Kenesei 49'; Iszlai (yellow card) 65'; Vörös 70'	Report	Oross 15' (o.g.); B. Farkas (yellow card) 75'	Stadium: Rohonci út Attendance: 6,000; Referee: Péter Solymosi; Assistant referees: Oszkár Lémon, Gábor Takács; Fourth official: Szabolcs Szilasi
Note: The matches of the 17th round were postponed due to HFF decision.

8 May 2009 27	MTK	0–1	Haladás	Budapest
19:00 CEST (UTC+2)	Urbán (yellow card) 48'; Hrepka (yellow card) 72'	Report	Kenesei 26'; B. Molnár (yellow card) 81'	Stadium: Hidegkuti Nándor Stadion; Attendance: 800; Referee: Ferenc Bede; Assistant referees: Róbert Kispál, István Tóth; Fourth official: József Erdős

13 May 2009 16	Győr	3–3	Haladás	Győr
19:00 CEST (UTC+2)	Bajzát 27'; Bicák (yellow card) 40'; Kink 46'; Aleksidze 77'	Report	N. Sipos 61', 90+1', (yellow card) 90+1'; Csontos 90+2'	Stadium: ETO Park; Attendance: 6,000; Referee: Tamás Arany; Assistant referees: Gábor Erős, Zsolt Butkai; Fourth official: Dániel Becséri

16 May 2009 28	Haladás	1–0	Diósgyőr	Szombathely
19:00 CEST (UTC+2)	Rajos (yellow card) 63'; Oross 88', (yellow card) 88'	Report	Lakatos (yellow card) 33'; Miličić (red card) 90+1'	Stadium: Rohonci út Attendance: 6,000; Referee: István Vad; Assistant referees: Balázs Farkas, Roland Schuszter; Fourth official: Balázs Böcskei

23 May 2009 29	Paks	0–2	Haladás	Paks
19:00 CEST (UTC+2)	Zováth (yellow card) 47'; J. Szabó (yellow card) 86'	Report	Kenesei (yellow card) 44', (goal) 47'; Oross 56'; Rózsa (yellow card) 68'	Stadium: Fehérvári úti Stadion; Attendance: 3,000; Referee: Zoltán Iványi; Assistant referees: Zsolt Szpisják, István Albert; Fourth official: Gábor Oláh

30 May 2009 30	Haladás	1–2	Zalaegerszeg	Szombathely
19:00 CEST (UTC+2)	B. Molnár (yellow card) 18'; P. Tóth I (yellow card) 27'; Oross 71'	Report	Botiș (yellow card) 35'; Pavićević 90'; Balázs 90+2'	Stadium: Rohonci út Attendance: 12,500; Referee: Viktor Kassai; Assistant referees: György Ring, Zsolt Márton; Fourth official: J. Zoltán Kovács

=== Magyar Kupa ===
3 September 2008 Third round	Integrál-DAC	0–1	Haladás	Győr
15:30 CEST (UTC+2)	Pásztor (yellow card) 37'; Laki (yellow card) 83'	Report	Vörös (yellow card) 39', (goal) 70'; Balassa (yellow card) 65'	Stadium: Nádorvárosi Stadion; Attendance: 600; Referee: Szabolcs Szilasi; Assistant referees: Gábor Takács, Gábor Gyürüsi

25 September 2008 Round of 32	Ferencváros	1–2	Haladás	Budapest
18:00 CEST (UTC+2)	Dragóner (yellow card) 41'; B. Tóth (yellow card) 62'; Ferenczi 66'	Report	Kenesei 11'; Guzmics 19'; Rózsa (yellow card) 81'	Stadium: Üllői úti Stadion; Attendance: 7,000; Referee: Zsolt Szabó; Assistant referees: Róbert Kispál, Tibor Vámos

==== Round of 16 ====
10 October 2008 First leg	Haladás	3–2	Győr	Szombathely
18:00 CEST (UTC+2)	Zs. Kovács (yellow card) 24', (goal) 77'; N. Sipos (yellow card) 29'; Oross (yellow card) 70'	Report	Böőr 18'; Stark 32' (pen.); Nikolov (yellow card) 53'; Bank (yellow card) 58'	Stadium: Rohonci út Attendance: 3,500; Referee: Péter Solymosi; Assistant referees: Vencel Tóth II, László Viszokai

22 October 2008 Second leg	Győr	4–0 (6–3 agg.)	Haladás	Győr
18:00 CEST (UTC+2)	Bank 14'; Józsi 24'; Böőr 71'; Šupić (yellow card) 75'; Brnović (yellow card) 86'; Bajzát 90+1'	Report	Maikel (yellow card) 44'; P. Tóth I (yellow card) 60'; Balassa (yellow card) 69'	Stadium: ETO Park; Attendance: 1,800; Referee: Ferenc Bede; Assistant referees: Balázs Farkas, Zsolt Márton
Note: Győr won 6–3 on aggregate.

=== Ligakupa ===
==== Group stage ====
Pos	Team	Pld	W	D	L	GF	GA	GD	Pts	Qualification	HAL	GYO	MTK	SIO	BUD	PAP
1	Haladás	10	7	1	2	23	10	+13	22	Advance to knockout phase	—	2–0	2–0	3–0	3–0	5–2
2	Győr	10	5	1	4	23	19	+4	16	Advance to knockout phase	4–0	—	1–1	3–0	6–0	0–4
3	MTK	10	4	3	3	13	17	−4	15		0–0	3–0	—	1–8	1–2	2–1
4	Siófok	10	4	2	4	20	16	+4	14		2–1	4–2	1–2	—	1–2	2–2
5	Budaörs	10	3	1	6	10	22	−12	10		2–5	0–1	0–1	0–2	—	3–1
6	Pápa	10	1	4	5	18	23	−5	7		0–2	5–6	2–2	0–0	1–1	—

Source: HFF

1 October 2008 1	Győr	4–0	Haladás	Győr
15:30 CEST (UTC+2)	M. Tóth 2'; Brnović 39', 44'; Csermelyi 78'	Report	Zs. Kovács (yellow card) 43'	Stadium: ETO Park; Attendance: 300; Referee: Norbert Kiss; Assistant referees: Balázs Farkas, Gábor Varga Jr.

15 October 2008 2	Haladás	5–2	Pápa	Szombathely
15:00 CEST (UTC+2)	Balassa 24'; Andorka (yellow card) 28', (goal) 61'; Skriba 34'; Schimmer 75'; Major 90+2'	Report	Zs. Fehér 39'; Lelkes (yellow card) 43'; Nyári 85'	Stadium: Rohonci út Attendance: 600; Referee: Gábor Oláh; Assistant referees: Szabolcs Deutsch, Arnold Kepe

29 October 2008 3	Haladás	3–0	Budaörs	Szombathely
15:00 CET (UTC+1)	Andorka 23'; N. Tóth 42'; Maikel 53'	Report	D. Varga (yellow card) 17'; Bálint (yellow card) 23'	Stadium: Rohonci út Attendance: 400; Referee: Tibor Gyarmati II; Assistant referees: Dr. Péter Kovács, Andrea Hima

12 November 2008 5	Haladás	2–0	MTK	Szombathely
15:30 CET (UTC+1)	N. Tóth 23'; Maikel 44'; Á. Simon (yellow card) 60'; Iszlai (yellow card) 87'	Report	Présinger (yellow card) 43'; L. Szabó (yellow card) 61'; Kornis (red card) 72'; Radulović (yellow card) 87'	Stadium: Rohonci út Attendance: 300; Referee: Tamás Arany; Assistant referees: Roland Schuszter, Brigitta Makkosné Petz

19 November 2008 4	Siófok	2–1	Haladás	Siófok
13:00 CET (UTC+1)	Magasföldi 32'; Ndjodo 44'; Tusori (yellow card) 90'	Report	Andorka 24'; Zs. Kovács (yellow card) 40'	Stadium: Révész Géza utcai Stadion; Attendance: 100; Referee: Ádám Németh; Assistant referees: Gergő Janitz, Ferenc Varga

23 November 2008 6	Haladás	2–0	Győr	Szombathely
16:30 CET (UTC+1)	Iszlai (yellow card) 21'; An. Simon II 51', 74'	Report	A. Pintér (yellow card) 18'; M. Tóth (yellow card) 45'; Fomumbod (yellow card) 53'; Böőr (yellow card) 80'	Stadium: Rohonci út Attendance: 400; Referee: Ferenc Bede; Assistant referees: György Ring, Zsolt Márton

29 November 2008 7	Pápa	0–2	Haladás	Pápa
15:00 CET (UTC+1)	A. Farkas (yellow card) 30'; Venczel (red card) 54'; Császár (yellow card) 55'; Z. Szabó (yellow card) 57'; Granát (yellow card) 72'; G. Varga (yellow card) 76'; Germán (yellow card) 82'	Report	Skriba 7'; Kaj (yellow card) 40'; N. Tóth 65'; Maikel (yellow card) 72'	Stadium: Perutz Stadion; Attendance: 400; Referee: István Mészáros; Assistant referees: László Viszokai, Zoltán Kis

6 December 2008 8	Budaörs	2–5	Haladás	Budaörs
13:00 CET (UTC+1)	R. Nagy 8'; Tüske 44'	Report	Skriba 6', 33'; Andorka 9'; Kaj 53'; Devecseri (yellow card) 65'; Csontos (yellow card) 77'; Maikel 83'	Stadium: Árok utcai Stadion; Attendance: 250; Referee: József Erdős; Assistant referees: Tibor Vámos, Balázs Farkas

22 January 2009 10	MTK	0–0	Haladás	Budapest (Note: The match was played at the Promontor utcai Stadion in Budapest, instead of MTK regular stadium, the Hidegkuti Nándor Stadion.)
13:00 CET (UTC+1)	Á. Szabó (yellow card) 68'	Report		Stadium: Promontor utcai Stadion; Attendance: 100; Referee: Gergő Király; Assistant referees: Zsolt Butkai, Ferenc Varga

7 February 2009 9	Haladás	3–0	Siófok	Szombathely
13:30 CET (UTC+1)	An. Simon II 23', 90'; Maikel (yellow card) 60'; Rácz 73'	Report	Hollósi (yellow card) 23'	Stadium: Illés Akadémia; Attendance: 200; Referee: Gábor Oláh; Assistant referees: Balázs Farkas, Andrea Hima

==== Knockout phase ====
===== Quarter-finals =====
4 March 2009 First Leg	Pécs	3–2	Haladás	Pécs
17:00 CET (UTC+1)	G. Kovács 75'; Z. Horváth 84'; Wittrédi (yellow card) 85'; Berdó 90+2', (yellow card) 90+2'	Report	Kenesei 44'; Kuttor 47'; Á. Simon (yellow card) 52'; Bonifert (yellow card) 71'; Devecseri (yellow card) 90+2'	Stadium: Stadion PMFC; Attendance: 600; Referee: István Mészáros; Assistant referees: László Viszokai, Zoltán Kis

17 March 2009 Second leg	Haladás	1–4 (3–7 agg.)	Pécs	Szombathely
17:00 CET (UTC+1)	Andorka 49'	Report	O. Nagy 10'; Szalai 22'; Lovrencsics 70'; Kulcsár 80'	Stadium: Rohonci út Attendance: 800; Referee: Gergely Sulyok; Assistant referees: Zsolt Butkai, Zsolt Márton
Note: Pécs won 7–3 on aggregate.
