= 2010–11 Szigetszentmiklósi TK season =

Szigetszentmiklós
2010–11 season
- Manager: Péter Várhidi
- Stadium: Sport utcai Stadion
- Nemzeti Bajnokság II (West): 10th
- Magyar Kupa: Third Round
- Top goalscorer: League: Árpád Majoros (9); All: Árpád Majoros (9)
- Highest home attendance: 600 v Gyirmót (9 October 2010, Nemzeti Bajnokság II)
- Lowest home attendance: 150 v (multiple Nemzeti Bajnokság II matches)
- Average home league attendance: 297
- Biggest win: 5–0 v Barcs (Home, 5 March 2011, Nemzeti Bajnokság II)
- Biggest defeat: 1–5 v Ferencváros II (Away, 16 April 2011, Nemzeti Bajnokság II)

The 2010–11 season was Szigetszentmiklósi Testgyakorlók Köre's 2nd consecutive season in the Nemzeti Bajnokság II and 60th year in existence as a football club. In addition to the domestic league, Szigetszentmiklós participated in that season's editions of the Magyar Kupa.

== Squad ==
Players with league appearances

Note: Flags indicate national team as defined under FIFA eligibility rules; some limited exceptions apply. Players may hold more than one non-FIFA nationality.

No.	Pos.	Nation	Player
1	GK	HUN	Kálmán Szabó
2	DF	HUN	Tamás Szamosi
3	DF	HUN	Gábor Szamosszegi
5	DF	HUN	Balázs Koszó
5	DF	HUN	Balázs Sallai
6	MF	HUN	Zoltán Csurka
7	DF	HUN	Károly Csák
8	MF	HUN	Tamás Somorjai
9	FW	HUN	Ádám Fekete
9	MF	HUN	Péter Kincses
10	FW	HUN	Tamás Ferenc Béres
10	DF	HUN	Máté Madar
11	FW	HUN	Zoltán Varga
13	MF	HUN	István Kozma
13	DF	HUN	Tibor Pomper
13	DF	HUN	István Ribi
14	FW	HUN	Péter Bonifert

No.	Pos.	Nation	Player
14	MF	HUN	György Zsömlye
15	MF	HUN	András Király
17	FW	COD	Noah Makutima
17	FW	HUN	György Mojzer
18	DF	HUN	Milán Rédei
19	FW	HUN	Mihály Tóth
20	GK	HUN	Zsolt Dénes
20	N/A	HUN	Krisztián Kiss
21	DF	HUN	Dániel Kollár
21	MF	HUN	Árpád Majoros
23	GK	HUN	Pál Tarczy
26	GK	HUN	Milán Balikó
27	MF	HUN	Richárd Csepregi
28	FW	HUN	László Szekeres
29	FW	HUN	Patrik Krómer
66	MF	HUN	Zoltán Pintér

== Transfers ==
=== Transfers in ===
Date	Pos.	No.	Player	From	Ref.
14 June 2010	DF	2	(Hungary) Tamás Szamosi	(Hungary) Pécs	
18 June 2010	MF	8	(Hungary) Tamás Somorjai	Free agent (Note: Previous club Diósgyőr.)	
18 June 2010	DF	3	(Hungary) Gábor Szamosszegi	(Hungary) Makó	
1 July 2010	MF	9	(Hungary) Péter Kincses	(Hungary) Vasas	
8 July 2010	DF	13	(Hungary) Tibor Pomper	Free agent (Note: Previous club Hévíz.)	
9 July 2010	DF	10	(Hungary) Máté Madar	(Hungary) Honvéd II	
21 July 2010	FW	11	(Hungary) Zoltán Varga	Free agent (Note: Previous club Pécs.)	
21 January 2011	GK	23	(Hungary) Pál Tarczy	Free agent (Note: Previous club Szolnok.)	
12 February 2011	FW	10	(Hungary) Tamás Ferenc Béres	Free agent (Note: Previous club Pápa.)	
22 February 2011	DF	5	(Hungary) Balázs Sallai	(Hungary) Rákospalota	
22 February 2011	GK	20	(Hungary) Zsolt Dénes	(Hungary) Békéscsaba	
22 February 2011	N/A	20	(Hungary) Krisztián Kiss	(Hungary) Rákosszentmihály	
22 February 2011	DF	21	(Hungary) Dániel Kollár	(Hungary) Tatabánya	

=== Transfers out ===
Date	Pos.	No.	Player	To	Ref.
13 August 2010	MF	11	(Hungary) Balázs Schrancz	(Hungary) Törtel	
13 August 2010	MF	23	(Hungary) József Bozsik	(Hungary) Pécs	
11 December 2010	MF	9	(Hungary) Péter Kincses	Released (Note: Joined Honvéd II.)	
11 December 2010	MF	14	(Hungary) György Zsömlye	Released (Note: Joined Veszprém on 15 January 2011.)	
11 January 2011	GK	1	(Hungary) Kálmán Szabó	(Hungary) Retired	
10 February 2011	FW	19	(Hungary) Mihály Tóth	(Hungary) Törtel	
22 February 2011	DF	13	(Hungary) Tibor Pomper	(Hungary) Released (Note: Joined Solt.)	

=== Loans in ===
Date	Pos.	No.	Player	From	End date	Ref.
12 August 2010	DF	5	(Hungary) Balázs Koszó	(Hungary) Kecskemét	Middle of season	
25 January 2011	FW	9	(Hungary) Ádám Fekete	(Hungary) Nyíregyháza	End of season	

=== Loans out ===
Date	Pos.	No.	Player	To	End date	Ref.
22 February 2011	MF	13	(Hungary) István Kozma	(Hungary) Soroksár	End of season	
22 February 2011	FW	17	(Democratic Republic of the Congo) Noah Makutima	(Hungary) Sárisáp	End of season	
24 January 2011	DF	10	(Hungary) Máté Madar	(Hungary) Honvéd II	End of season	
24 January 2011	FW	17	(Hungary) György Mojzer	(Hungary) Csepel	End of season	

== Competitions ==
=== Overview ===
Competition	First match	Last match	Starting round	Final position	Record							
Competition	First match	Last match	Starting round	Final position	Pld	W	D	L	GF	GA	GD	Win %
Nemzeti Bajnokság II	15 August 2010	11 June 2011	Matchday 1	10th	30	12	6	12	45	40	+5	40.00
Magyar Kupa	18 August 2010	22 September 2010	Second Round	Third Round	2	1	0	1	1	3	−2	50.00
Total					32	13	6	13	46	43	+3	40.63

Source: Competitions

=== Nemzeti Bajnokság II ===
==== League table ====
Pos	Team	Pld	W	D	L	GF	GA	GD	Pts
8	Kozármisleny	30	13	6	11	41	37	+4	45
9	Győr II	30	13	3	14	42	47	−5	42
10	Szigetszentmiklós	30	12	6	12	45	40	+5	42
11	Budaörs	30	11	8	11	42	41	+1	41
12	Ferencváros II	30	10	4	16	36	35	+1	34

Source: Soccerway
Rules for classification: 1) Points; 2) Matches won; 3) Goal difference; 4) Goals scored; 5) Head-to-head points; 6) Head-to-head goal difference; 7) Head-to-head away goals scored; 8) Fair play ranking; 9) Drawing of lots.

==== Results summary ====
Overall								Home						Away					
Pld	W	D	L	GF	GA	GD	Pts	W	D	L	GF	GA	GD	W	D	L	GF	GA	GD
30	12	6	12	45	40	+5	42	9	3	3	26	12	+14	3	3	9	19	28	−9

Source: Hungarian Football Federation

==== Results by round ====
Round	1	2	3	4	5	6	7	8	9	10	11	12	13	14	15	16	17	18	19	20	21	22	23	24	25	26	27	28	29	30
Ground	A	H	A	A	H	A	H	A	H	A	H	A	H	A	H	H	A	H	H	A	H	A	H	A	H	A	H	A	H	A
Result	D	L	W	L	D	L	W	L	W	D	D	L	W	L	W	W	L	W	W	L	W	L	L	D	W	L	D	L	L	W
Position	9	13	9	11	14	13	13	15	10	11	12	12	11	12	9	8	10	9	8	6	6	7	7	8	7	9	9	9	11	10
Points	1	1	4	4	5	5	8	8	11	12	13	13	16	16	19	22	22	25	28	31	34	34	34	35	38	38	39	39	39	42

Source: Matches
A = Away; H = Home; W = Win; D = Draw; L = Loss

==== Matches ====
15 August 2010 1	Barcs	2–2	Szigetszentmiklós	Barcs
17:30 CEST (UTC+2)	Šćepanović 43', 73'; Bernardo (yellow card) 58'; P. Horváth (yellow card) 84'; K. Koller (yellow card) 84'; Hock (yellow card) 86'	Report	Szamosszegi (yellow card) 33'; Majoros 63'; M. Tóth 85'	Stadium: Barcsi Szabadidőközpont; Attendance: 500; Referee: Norbert Kiss; Assistant referees: Arnold Kepe, Tamás Kulman

21 August 2010 2	Szigetszentmiklós	1–3	Győr II	Szigetszentmiklós
17:30 CEST (UTC+2)	M. Tóth 45'; Balikó (yellow card) 63'; Szamosszegi (yellow card) 66'	Report	Windecker (yellow card) 13'; Ahjupera 18', 40', 90+2'	Stadium: Sport utcai Stadion; Attendance: 300; Referee: Gábor Barna; Assistant referees: Balázs Kiss, Tímea Nagy

28 August 2010 3	Budaörs	0–1	Szigetszentmiklós	Budaörs
17:30 CEST (UTC+2)	Hegedűs (yellow card) 24'; T. Kiss (yellow card) 56'; Mihályi (yellow card) 87'	Report	Z. Pintér (yellow card) 39', (goal) 54'; Szamosi (yellow card) 62'	Stadium: Árok utca Attendance: 200; Referee: Balázs Berke; Assistant referees: István Tóth, Dániel Szalai

4 September 2010 4	Veszprém	2–1	Szigetszentmiklós	Veszprém
16:30 CEST (UTC+2)	Z. Kollár (yellow card) 51'; Tatai (yellow card) 56'; Karakai 75'; Szamosi 90+2' (o.g.)	Report	Majoros (yellow card) 11'; M. Tóth 51'	Stadium: Városi Stadion; Attendance: 200; Referee: Csaba Pintér; Assistant referees: Krisztián Király, Dr. Tamás Bede

11 September 2010 5	Szigetszentmiklós	0–0	Tatabánya	Szigetszentmiklós
16:30 CEST (UTC+2)	Z. Pintér (yellow card) 74'	Report	Köntös (yellow card) 78'; Bencze (yellow card) 90+1'	Stadium: Sport utcai Stadion; Attendance: 250; Referee: Róbert Nagy; Assistant referees: Tamás Márkus, János Demeter

18 September 2010 6	Kozármisleny	2–1	Szigetszentmiklós	Kozármisleny
16:00 CEST (UTC+2)	Kollega 8'; Andruskó (yellow card) 38'; T. Kovács (yellow card) 81'; Z. Tóth 90' (pen.)	Report	Mojzer (yellow card) 45'; Pomper (red card) 73'; Majoros (yellow card) 75'; Rédei (yellow card) 81'; Z. Pintér (yellow card) 89'; M. Tóth 90+2'	Stadium: Alkotmány tér Attendance: 400; Referee: István Mészáros; Assistant referees: Zoltán Kis, László Sebestyén

25 September 2010 7	Szigetszentmiklós	1–0	Ferencváros II	Szigetszentmiklós
16:00 CEST (UTC+2)	Majoros (yellow card) 32'; K. Szabó (not on pitch) (yellow card) 32'; Szamosszegi (yellow card) 78'; M. Tóth 81'; Szamosi (yellow card) 88'	Report	Peszmeg (yellow card) 58'; Haber (yellow card) 60'	Stadium: Sport utcai Stadion; Attendance: 500; Referee: Balázs Böcskei; Assistant referees: Tamás Péter, Roland Hofbauer

2 October 2010 8	Videoton II	3–0	Szigetszentmiklós	Felcsút
15:00 CEST (UTC+2)	Móri (yellow card) 16'; Kayongo-Mutumba 23'; Rédei 30' (o.g.); Szolnoki (yellow card) 34'; Vujović 57', (yellow card) 80'	Report	Koszó (yellow card) 15'; Z. Pintér (yellow card) 66'; Rédei (red card) 90'	Stadium: Felcsút Sporttelep; Attendance: 200; Referee: Szabolcs Szilasi; Assistant referees: Gábor Gyürüsi, Brigitta Makossné Petz

9 October 2010 9	Szigetszentmiklós	3–1	Gyirmót	Szigetszentmiklós
15:00 CEST (UTC+2)	Csák (yellow card) 23'; Szamosi (yellow card) 32'; Majoros 54'; Király 85'; Csurka 87', (yellow card) 87'	Report	Weitner 25'; Laki (yellow card) 67'	Stadium: Sport utcai Stadion; Attendance: 600; Referee: Ferenc Bede; Assistant referees: Arnold Kepe, Tamás Kulman

17 October 2010 10	BKV Előre	1–1	Szigetszentmiklós	Budapest
14:30 CEST (UTC+2)	Csikós (yellow card) 36'; Makrai 63'; Cseri (yellow card) 85'	Report	Majoros 64'; Szamosszegi (yellow card) 90'	Stadium: Sport utcai stadium Attendance: 200; Referee: Mihály Fábián; Assistant referees: Dr. Zsolt Varga, Roland Galán

23 October 2010 11	Szigetszentmiklós	1–1	Ajka	Szigetszentmiklós
14:30 CEST (UTC+2)	Pákai 77' (o.g.)	Report	Mihalecz 69'; Kottán (yellow card) 84'	Stadium: Sport utcai Stadion; Attendance: 500; Referee: Balázs Böcskei; Assistant referees: Tamás Péter, Dr. Ferenc Bede

30 October 2010 12	Baja	3–1	Szigetszentmiklós	Baja
14:30 CEST (UTC+2)	Kormos 18'; Balázs 22'; Micskó (yellow card) 61'; Frőhlich 85', (yellow card) 85'	Report	Koszó (yellow card) 35'; Szamosszegi (yellow card) 44'; Csepregi 62'	Stadium: Városi Sporttelep; Attendance: 600; Referee: István Vad; Assistant referees: György Ring, István Iványi

6 November 2010 13	Szigetszentmiklós	4–0	Kaposvölgye	Szigetszentmiklós
13:30 CET (UTC+1)	Szamosi (yellow card) 7'; Z. Pintér (yellow card) 12'; Kincses 48', (yellow card) 88'; Majoros 58', 75'; Csurka 67'	Report	Vaskó (yellow card) 37'; Dóczi (yellow card) 54'; Fellai (yellow card) 77'	Stadium: Sport utcai Stadion; Attendance: 200; Referee: Ádám Radványi; Assistant referees: Attila Forgács, László Sebestyén

13 November 2010 14	Pécs	2–1	Szigetszentmiklós	Pécs
16:00 CET (UTC+1)	Gyánó 11'; Stark (yellow card) 43'; Lantos (yellow card) 60'; Stojanovski 65'; A. Horváth (yellow card) 87'	Report	Kincses 73'	Stadium: Stadion PMFC; Attendance: 600; Referee: Krisztián Pánczél; Assistant referees: Zoltán Kis, Balázs Kiss

20 November 2010 15	Szigetszentmiklós	2–1	Honvéd II	Szigetszentmiklós
13:00 CET (UTC+1)	Bonifert 57'; Csurka 90' (pen.)	Report	Vólent 76', (yellow card) 80'; Cséke (yellow card) 90+1'	Stadium: Sport utcai Stadion; Attendance: 150; Referee: Gábor Péter Kovács; Assistant referees: Arnold Kepe, Tamás Kulman

5 March 2011 16	Szigetszentmiklós	5–0	Barcs	Szigetszentmiklós
14:30 CET (UTC+1)	Bonifert 30', 50', 61'; Fekete 40', 53'; Király (yellow card) 41'	Report		Stadium: Sport utcai Stadion; Attendance: 300; Referee: László Lovas; Assistant referees: János Medovarszki, Balázs Buzás

12 March 2011 17	Győr II	2–1	Szigetszentmiklós	Győr
14:30 CET (UTC+1)	Totadze 4'; Nagy (red card) 61'; Molnár 70'	Report	Szamosszegi (red card) 42'; Béres 63'	Stadium: ETO Park; Attendance: 350; Referee: Tibor Farkas; Assistant referees: Gábor Takács, József Aradi

26 March 2011 19	Szigetszentmiklós	2–1	Veszprém	Szigetszentmiklós
15:00 CET (UTC+1)	Király (yellow card) 15'; Fekete 25', (yellow card) 90'; Béres 55'; Csák (yellow card) 77'	Report	Grósz (yellow card) 14'; Lang (yellow card) 54'; Szöllőskei 80'	Stadium: Sport utcai Stadion; Attendance: 300; Referee: Balázs Berke; Assistant referees: Gyula Punyi, Norbert Szilágyi

2 April 2011 20	Tatabánya	1–4	Szigetszentmiklós	Tatabánya
16:30 CEST (UTC+2)	Kocsis 18', (yellow card) 51'; Deme (red card) 56'; Módi (yellow card) 76'	Report	Somorjai 10', 48'; Bonifert 27', 65'; Z. Pintér (yellow card) 39'; Majoros (yellow card) 51'	Stadium: Városi Stadion; Attendance: 500; Referee: Csaba Pintér; Assistant referees: Tamás Péter, Brigitta Makkosné Petz

9 April 2011 21	Szigetszentmiklós	2–0	Kozármisleny	Szigetszentmiklós
16:30 CEST (UTC+2)	Fekete 40'; Majoros 44'; Sallai (yellow card) 46'; Z. Pintér (yellow card) 69'; Béres (yellow card) 71'	Report	Petrók (yellow card) 40'; Fellai (yellow card) 43'	Stadium: Sport utcai Stadion; Attendance: 200; Referee: Róbert Nagy; Assistant referees: Zolzán Pápai, Katalin Török

13 April 2011 17	Szigetszentmiklós	2–1	Budaörs	Szigetszentmiklós
16:30 CEST (UTC+2)	Majoros (yellow card) 34'; Fekete 71'; Mihályi 75' (o.g.)	Report	Pleván 50'	Stadium: Sport utcai Stadion; Attendance: 150; Referee: Krisztián Pánczél; Assistant referees: Dániel Szalai, Gergely Becséri
Note: The match was postponed from 19 March 2011, due to a widespread illness that left the home side with only six available players, and was rescheduled to 13 April at 16:30 (UTC+2).

16 April 2011 22	Ferencváros II	5–1	Szigetszentmiklós	Budapest
17:00 CEST (UTC+2)	Pölöskei 9'; B. Tóth 11'; B. Varga 48'; Papp 51'; Is. Kovács 82'	Report	Fekete 25'; Z. Pintér (yellow card) 49'; Tarczy (yellow card) 49'; Béres (yellow card) 76'	Stadium: Stadion Albert Flórián; Attendance: 200; Referee: J. Zoltán Kovács; Assistant referees: Milán Mohos, Gábor Gyürüsi

23 April 2011 23	Szigetszentmiklós	1–3	Videoton II	Szigetszentmiklós
17:00 CEST (UTC+2)	Majoros 37'; Sallai (red card) 54'; Z. Pintér (yellow card) 72'	Report	Babos (yellow card) 32', (goal) 58'; Margitics (yellow card) 43'; Papucsek (yellow card) 54', (goal) 70'; Fejes 82'	Stadium: Sport utcai Stadion; Attendance: 200; Referee: János Takács; Assistant referees: Lajos L. Tóth, Dr. Judit Kulcsár

30 April 2011 24	Gyirmót	0–0	Szigetszentmiklós	Győr
18:00 CEST (UTC+2)	Weitner (yellow card) 43'	Report	Krómer (yellow card) 67'; Csák (yellow card) 80'	Stadium: Ménfői úti Stadion; Attendance: 600; Referee: Mihály Fábián; Assistant referees: Tamás Márkus, Roland Galán

8 May 2011 25	Szigetszentmiklós	2–0	BKV Előre	Szigetszentmiklós
16:00 CEST (UTC+2)	Majoros 6', (yellow card) 34'; Z. Pintér (yellow card) 44'; Bonifert (yellow card) 63'; Csepregi 83'	Report	Csikós (yellow card) 43'; Baranyai (yellow card) 52'; Fazakas (yellow card) 73'	Stadium: Sport utcai Stadion; Attendance: 200; Referee: Dániel Becséri; Assistant referees: Roland Hofbauer, Andrea Hima

14 May 2011 26	Ajka	1–0	Szigetszentmiklós	Ajka
17:30 CEST (UTC+2)	L. Szabó 6'; Norbert Major (yellow card) 19'; Sallér (yellow card) 29'	Report	Béres (yellow card) 3'; Szamosszegi (yellow card) 45'; Z. Varga (yellow card) 61'; Tarczy (yellow card) 88'; Majoros (yellow card) 90+3'	Stadium: Városi Szabadidő- és Sportcentrum; Attendance: 200; Referee: Ádám Farkas; Assistant referees: Balázs Huszár, Katalin Török

21 May 2011 27	Szigetszentmiklós	0–0	Baja	Szigetszentmiklós
18:00 CEST (UTC+2)	Szamosi (yellow card) 61'; Király (yellow card) 80'	Report	Császár (red card) 37'; Szauter (yellow card) 63'; Kormos (yellow card) 86'	Stadium: Sport utcai Stadion; Attendance: 200; Referee: Gergely Szőts; Assistant referees: Zoltán Pápai, Roland Galán

27 May 2011 28	Kaposvölgye	2–1	Szigetszentmiklós	Nagyberki
18:00 CEST (UTC+2)	Burai (yellow card) 36'; Sowunmi 66'; Im. Kovács 73'	Report	Király (yellow card) 26'; Majoros (yellow card) 35'; Z. Pintér (yellow card) 43'; Csák 45'	Stadium: Arany János utca Attendance: 50; Referee: Béla Botló; Assistant referees: Gábor Gyürüsi, József Aradi

4 June 2011 29	Szigetszentmiklós	0–1	Pécs	Szigetszentmiklós
18:00 CEST (UTC+2)	Szamosi (yellow card) 28'; Sallai (yellow card) 30'	Report	Törtei (yellow card) 49'; Gyánó 54'; Wittrédi (yellow card) 59'; A. Pintér (yellow card) 87'; Z. Horváth (yellow card) 90+1'	Stadium: Sport utcai Stadion; Attendance: 400; Referee: Rolnd Veizer; Assistant referees: István Tóth, János Demeter

11 June 2011 30	Honvéd II	2–4	Szigetszentmiklós	Budapest
18:00 CEST (UTC+2)	Remes 35', (yellow card) 43'; Vólent 56', (yellow card) 76'	Report	Bonifert 33'; Somorjai 59'; Fekete 60'; Ribi (yellow card) 73'; Majoros 85'; Szamosi (yellow card) 88'	Stadium: Bozsik József Stadion; Attendance: 150; Referee: Krisztián Pánczél; Assistant referees: Roland Hofbauer, Brigitta Makkosné Petz

=== Magyar Kupa ===
18 Augusztus 2010 Second round	Tát	0–1	Szigetszentmiklós	Tát
16:30 CEST (UTC+2)	Szalay (yellow card) 18'; Lohner (yellow card) 26'; Kaptás (yellow card) 74'; F. Koller (red card) 87'	Report	Mojzer 7'; Pomper (yellow card) 90+2'	Stadium: Táti Sportpálya; Referee: Katalin Kulcsár; Assistant referees: Dr. Tamás Bede, Péter Szabó

22 September 2010 Third round	Rákospalota	3–0	Szigetszentmiklós	Budapest
15:30 CEST (UTC+2)	Olasz (yellow card) 42'; Gulyás (yellow card) 52'	Report	Rédei (yellow card) 22'; Szamosszegi (yellow card) 25'; Kincses (yellow card) 44'; Z. Pintér (yellow card) 49'	Stadium: Budai II. László Stadion; Referee: Sándor Andó-Szabó; Assistant referees: Attila Kelemen, Gábor Varga Jr.

== Statistics ==
=== Overall ===
Appearances (Apps) numbers are for appearances in competitive games only, including sub appearances.
Source: Competitions

No.	Player	Pos.	Nemzeti Bajnokság I				Magyar Kupa				Total			
No.	Player	Pos.	Apps	Goal	Yellow card	Red card	Apps	Goal	Yellow card	Red card	Apps	Goal	Yellow card	Red card
1	(Hungary) Kálmán Szabó	GK	4		1						4		1	
2	(Hungary) Tamás Szamosi	DF	26		7		2				28		7	
3	(Hungary) Gábor Szamosszegi	DF	27		6	1	2		1		29	0	7	1
5	(Hungary) Dominic Bödő	N/A												
5	(Hungary) Balázs Koszó	DF	6		2						6		2	
5	(Hungary) Balázs Sallai	DF	12		2	1					12		2	1
6	(Hungary) Zoltán Csurka	MF	18	3	1		2				20	3	1	
7	(Hungary) Károly Csák	DF	22	1	3		1				23	1	3	
8	(Hungary) Tamás Somorjai	MF	28	3			2				30	3		
9	(Hungary) Ádám Fekete	FW	14	7	1						14	7	1	
9	(Hungary) Péter Kincses	MF	21	2	1		1		1		22	2	2	
10	(Hungary) Tamás Ferenc Béres	FW	14	2	3						14	2	3	
10	(Hungary) Máté Madar	DF	8				1				9			
11	(Hungary) Zoltán Varga	FW	6		1						6		1	
13	(Hungary) István Kozma	MF	5				1				6			
13	(Hungary) Tibor Pomper	DF	11			1	2		1		13		1	1
13	(Hungary) István Ribi	DF	4		1						4		1	
14	(Hungary) Péter Bonifert	FW	21	7	1						21	7	1	
14	(Hungary) György Zsömlye	MF	1				1				2			
15	(Hungary) András Király	MF	29	1	4		1				30	1	4	
17	(Democratic Republic of the Congo) Noah Makutima	FW	4								4			
17	(Hungary) György Mojzer	FW	13		1		2	1			15	1	1	
18	(Hungary) Milán Rédei	DF	12		1	1	1		1		13		2	1
19	(Hungary) Mihály Tóth	FW	11	5			2				13	5		
20	(Hungary) Zsolt Dénes	GK	1								1			
20	(Hungary) Krisztián Kiss	N/A	1								1			
20	(Hungary) Krisztián Pálvölgyi	N/A												
21	(Hungary) Dániel Kollár	DF	2								2			
21	(Hungary) Árpád Majoros	MF	27	9	8		1				28	9	8	
22	(Hungary) Norbert Hara	N/A												
23	(Hungary) Balázs Borsos	MF												
23	(Hungary) Pál Tarczy	GK	14		2						14		2	
26	(Hungary) Milán Balikó	GK	11		1		2				13		1	
27	(Hungary) Richárd Csepregi	MF	22	2			1				23	2		
28	(Hungary) László Szekeres	FW	1								1			
29	(Hungary) Patrik Krómer	FW	2		1						2		1	
66	(Hungary) Zoltán Pintér	MF	28	1	11		2		1		30	1	12	
Own goals				2										
Totals				45	59	4		1	5			46	64	4

=== Hat-tricks ===
No.	Player	Against	Result	Date	Competition
14	(Hungary) Péter Bonifert	Barcs (H)	5–0	5 March 2011	Nemzeti Bajnokság II

=== Clean sheets ===
			Clean sheets		
No.	Player	Games Played	Nemzeti Bajnokság II	Magyar Kupa	Total
23	(Hungary) Pál Tarczy	14	5		5
26	(Hungary) Milán Balikó	13	3	1	4
1	(Hungary) Kálmán Szabó	4	1		1
20	(Hungary) Zsolt Dénes	1			
Totals			9	1	10
