= List of Szombathelyi Haladás players =

This is a list of Szombathelyi Haladás players.

== A ==
- (Brazil) (Hungary) Leandro Marcolini Pedroso de Almeida
- (Hungary) Péter Andorka
- (Brazil) Michael Thiago Barbosa de Araujo

== B ==
- (Hungary) Ferenc Babati
- (Hungary) Péter Balassa
- (Hungary) Csaba Balog
- (Federal Republic of Yugoslavia) (Serbia) Igor Bogdanović
- (Hungary) Péter Bonifert

== C ==
- (Liberia) Victor Pony Carr
- (Hungary) Zoltán Csontos

== D ==
- (Hungary) Szilárd Devecseri
- (Senegal) El Hadji Diouf

== F ==
- (Hungary) Márk Farkas

== G ==
- (Austria) (Hungary) György Garics
- (Hungary) Richárd Guzmics
- (Hungary) Bence Gyurján
- (Hungary) Márton Gyurján

== H ==
- (Hungary) Péter Halmosi

== I ==
- (Hungary) Béla Illés
- (Hungary) Ignác Irhás
- (Hungary) Bence Iszlai

== K ==
- (Hungary) András Kaj
- (Hungary) Milán Kalász
- (Hungary) Krisztián Kenesei
- (Hungary) Gábor Király
- (Ukraine) (Hungary) Vladimir Koman
- (Hungary) István Kovács
- (Hungary) Zsolt Kovács
- (Hungary) Attila Kuttor

== L ==
- (Hungary) Norbert Lattenstein
- (Hungary) Dániel Lengyel

== M ==
- (Hungary) Balázs Molnár

== N ==
- (Hungary) Gábor Nagy

== O ==
- (Hungary) Márton Oross

== P ==
- (France) Jean-Baptiste Paternotte
- (Hungary) Péter Pölöskey

== R ==
- (Hungary) Ferenc Rácz
- (Hungary) Gábor Rajos
- (Hungary) Dániel Rózsa

== S ==
- (Hungary) Szabolcs Schimmer
- (Romania) Tibor Selymes
- (Brazil) Nélio da Silva Melo
- (Hungary) Ádám Simon
- (Hungary) Attila Simon
- (Hungary) Norbert Sipos
- (Hungary) Máté Skriba
- (Hungary) Zoltán Szarka
- (Hungary) Tamás Szép

== T ==
- (Hungary) Béla Takács
- (Hungary) Norbert Tóth
- (Hungary) Péter Tóth

== U ==
- (Hungary) Roland Ugrai

== V ==
- (Hungary) Péter Vörös
