= Krisztián =

Krisztián is a given name. Notable people with the name include:

- Krisztián Adorján (born 1993), Hungarian footballer
- Krisztián Balázs (born 2002), Hungarian gymnast
- Krisztián Bártfai (born 1974), Hungarian sprint canoeist
- Krisztián Berki (born 1985), Hungarian artistic gymnast
- Krisztián Budovinszky (born 1976), Hungarian footballer
- Krisztián Cser (born 1977), Hungarian opera singer and physicist
- Krisztián Csillag (born 1975), Hungarian footballer
- Krisztián Dóczi (born 1989), Hungarian footballer
- Krisztián Éder (born 1988), Hungarian singer/rapper
- Krisztián Forró (born 1976), Slovak businessman and politician
- Krisztián Füzi (born 1975), Hungarian footballer
- Krisztián Futaki (born 1979), Hungarian footballer
- Krisztian Gardos (born 1975), Hungarian-Austrian para table tennis player
- Krisztián Géresi (born 1994), Hungarian footballer
- Krisztián Grecsó (born 1976), Hungarian writer
- Krisztián Hegyi (born 2002), Hungarian footballer
- Krisztián Jordanov (born 1976), Hungarian gymnast
- Krisztián Kapus (born 1974), Hungarian politician
- Krisztián Kenesei (born 1977), Hungarian footballer
- Krisztián Keresztes (born 2000), Hungarian footballer
- Krisztián Kollega (born 1985), Hungarian footballer
- Krisztián Koller (born 1983), Hungarian footballer
- Krisztián Kovács (born 2000), Hungarian footballer
- Krisztián Kulcsár (born 1971), Hungarian fencer
- Krisztián Kuti (born 1992), Hungarian footballer
- Krisztián Lisztes, multiple people
- Krisztián Lovassy (born 1988), Hungarian racing cyclist
- Krisztián Manhercz (born 1997), Hungarian water polo player
- Krisztián Nagy, multiple people
- Krisztián Németh (born 1989), Hungarian footballer
- Krisztián Németh (Slovak footballer) (born 1975), Slovak football manager and player
- Krisztián Nyerges (born 1977), Hungarian footballer
- Krisztián Palkovics (born 1975), Hungarian ice hockey player
- Krisztián Pars (born 1982), Hungarian hammer thrower
- Krisztián Pest (born 1975), Hungarian footballer
- Krisztián Pogacsics (born 1985), Hungarian-Slovene footballer
- Krisztián Póti (born 1988), Hungarian footballer
- Krisztián Rabb (born 2001), Hungarian fencer
- Krisztián Sárneczky (born 1974), Hungarian amateur astronomer
- Krisztián Simon (born 1991), Hungarian footballer
- Krisztián Szabó (speed skater) (1974–2024), Hungarian speed skater
- Krisztián Szollár (born 1980), Hungarian footballer
- Krisztián Takács (born 1985), Hungarian swimmer
- Krisztián Tamás (born 1995), Hungarian footballer
- Krisztián Tiber (born 1972), Hungarian footballer
- Krisztián Tímár (born 1979), Hungarian football manager and player
- Krisztián Tölgyesi (born 1975), Hungarian judoka
- Krisztián Tóth (born 1994), Hungarian judoka
- Krisztián Ungváry (born 1969), Hungarian historian
- Krisztián Vadócz (born 1985), Hungarian footballer
- Krisztián Veréb (1977–2020), Hungarian sprint canoeist
- Krisztián Vermes (born 1985), Hungarian footballer
- Krisztián Vida, Hungarian astronomer
- Krisztián Wittmann (born 1985), Hungarian basketball player
- Krisztián Zahorecz (1975–2019), Hungarian footballer

== See also ==
- Christian (given name)
