= 2010–11 Magyar Kupa =

Tournament details
- Country: Hungary
- Teams: 154

Final positions
- Champions: Kecskemét (1st title)
- Runners-up: Videoton

Tournament statistics
- Matches played: 165
- Goals scored: 638 (3.87 per match)
- Top goal scorer(s): (Hungary) László Kormos (Central African Republic) Foxi Kethevoama (6 each)

The 2010–11 Magyar Kupa (English: Hungarian Cup) was the 71st season of Hungary's annual knock-out cup football competition. It started with the first match of Round 1 on 7 August 2010 and ended with the final held on 17 May 2011 at Stadium Puskás Ferenc, Budapest. The winners, Kecskemét, earned a place in the second qualifying round of the 2011–12 UEFA Europa League. Debrecen were the defending champions, having won their fourth cup competition last season.

== Qualifying phase ==
=== Round 1 ===
Matches were played on 7 and 8 August 2009 and involved the teams qualified through the local cup competitions during the previous season and the Nemzeti Bajnokság III teams.

Team #1	Score	Team #2
Bölcskei SE	1–2	Tököl VSK
Nagyatád	2–3	NTE 1866 MÁV
Rákosmenti KSK	1–2	Érdi VSE
Kulcs SE	2–3	Hartai SE
Miskolci VSC	0–4	Egri FC
Pétervására SE	7–0	Nagybátonyi SC
Pálmonostora SE	0–4	Pálhalma SE
Kiskanizsai Sáskák SE	0–1	Mezőcsokonya SE
Csillaghegyi MTE	1–4	Tát SE
Kiskőrösi LC	1–3	Szegedi VSE
Oroszlányi SZE	1–6	Győrszemere KSK
Egyházasfalu SE	0–3	Körmendi FC
Lébény SE	1–3	Kemenesmagasi SE
Esztergom SC	0–6	Újbuda FC
Szentlőrinc SE	0–3	Bajai LSE
Siklósi FC	0–2	Szekszárdi UFC
Dunaharaszti MTK	6–0	Jánoshidai SE
Újfehértó SE	1–2	Cigánd SE
Öttevény TC	1–0	Ugod SE
Lövő SE	1–2 a.e.t.	Király
Szentpéterfai SE	0–5	Let's Do It Technoroll
Kávás KSE	1–9	Angol Foci Suli Páterdomb
Gázművek MTE	1–1 a.e.t.; 4–5 pen	Gödöllői SK
Balatonszárszó KSE	2–3 a.e.t.	Úrkút SK
Dunaszeg SE	1–3	ETE SE
Aszód FC	0–3 (w/o)	Újpest II

Team #1	Score	Team #2
Ladánybenei FC	2–4	Csepel FC
Gyomaendrődi FC	1–4	Püspökladányi LE
Fehérgyarmati FC	0–1	Nagyecsed RSE
KÉK SE	1–4	Tiszalúc NKSE
Tállya KSE	3–1	Nyírmadai ISE
Encs Városi SC	1–3	Tiszakanyár SE
Demecseri SE	0–4	FC Tiszaújváros
Szécsény VSE	1–2	Putnok VSE
Novaj-Ostoros SE	3–2	Sajókaza SE
Rum KSC	0–2	Soproni VSE
Várvölgy SE	1–3	Veszprém FC
Szentantalfa Nivegy-Völgy	2–5	Csákvári TK
Zalakomár Egyetértés SE	0–2	Balatonlelle SE
Egerág SE	1–2	Kakasd SE
Bácsborsódi SK	0–0 a.e.t.; 4–5 pen	Hódmezővásárhelyi FC
Ásotthalom TE	0–3	Gyulai FC
Tótkomlósi TC	1–2	Tisza Volán SC
Verőce SE	2–1	Pénzügyőr SE
Törteli KSK	2–0	Szolnoki Spartacus
Szajol KLK	1–2	Felsőpakony SK
Bárándi KSE	6–1	Füzesgyarmati SK
Körösszegapáti SE	3–5	Karcagi SE
KSE Karancslapujtő	1–4	Felsőtárkány SC
Hajdúsámson SE	0–3	Tiszabecs LC
Rábapatyi KSK	1–4	Lipót SE
Satelit FC Somogytarnóca	0–6	Komlói Bányász SK

=== Round 2 ===
These matches were played between 17 and 18 August 2010 and involved the winners of Round 1 and the 2010–11 Nemzeti Bajnokság II teams.

Team #1	Score	Team #2
Felsőtárkány SC	2–0	FC Tiszaújváros
Pálhalma SE	0–3	Rákospalota
ETE SE	0–5	Győr II
Úrkút SK	1–4	Soproni VSE
Öttevény TC	1–2	Tatabánya
ZTE II	4–4 a.e.t.; 4–5 pen	Veszprém FC
Let's Do It Technoroll	3–0	Körmendi FC
Angol Foci Suli Páterdomb	0–5	Kaposvölgye
Hartai SE	2–4	Bajai LSE
Mezőcsokonya SE	0–2	Kakasd SE
Tisza Volán SC	3–2	Gyulai FC
Szegedi VSE	1–3	Békéscsaba
Törteli KSK	1–5	Budaörs
Csákvári TK	2–2 a.e.t.; 5–6 pen	MTK II
Csepel FC	0–5	Dunaharaszti MTK
Püspökladányi LE	0–2	Debreceni EAC
Karcagi SE	2–3	Bárándi KSE
Cigánd SE	0–3	Nyíregyháza
Tállya KSE	5–6 a.e.t.	Nagyecsed RSE
Tiszalúc NKSE	0–3	Tiszakanyár SE
Baktalórántháza	0–3	Bőcs

Team #1	Score	Team #2
Tiszabecs LC	4–3	Hajdúböszörményi TE
Pétervására SE	1–0	Kazincbarcikai SC
Tököl VSK	3–2	Vecsési FC
Novaj-Ostoros SE	0–3	Putnok VSE
Verőce SE	1–3	Videoton-Puskás Akadémia
Győrszemere KSK	4–1	FC Ajka
Velence SE	2–6	BKV Előre
Tát SE	0–1	Szigetszentmiklósi TK
Balatonlelle SE	2–1	Hévíz FC
Gödöllői SK	2–4 a.e.t.	Honvéd II
Király SZE	2–3 a.e.t.	Lipót SE
Szekszárdi UFC	2–1	Kozármisleny
Felsőpakony SK	1–4 a.e.t.	Dunakanyar-Vác
NTE 1866 MÁV	0–7	Pécs
Komlói Bányász SK	1–2	Bonyhád VLC
Hódmezővásárhelyi FC	0–1	Makói FC
Érdi VSE	0–1	Ceglédi VSE
Egri FC	3–2 a.e.t.	Diósgyőr
Pásztó SK	0–6	Mezőkövesd-Zsóry SE
Újbuda FC	5–1	Újpest II
Kemenesmagasi SE	2–5	Gyirmót

=== Round 3 ===
These matches were played between 21 September 2010 and 5 October 2010. The winners of Round 2 were joined by the majority of the 2010–11 Nemzeti Bajnokság I teams; sides involved in a European cup competition were given a bye to the next round.

Team 1	Score	Team 2
Győrszemere KSK	1–2	Haladás
Tisza Volán SC	2–1	Szolnok
Győr II	1–2	Pápa
Lipót SK	2–1 (a.e.t.)	Veszprém FC
Bonyhád VLC	0–2	Siófok
Pécs	7–1	Kaposvölgye
Kakasd SE	1–7	Bajai LSE
Szekszárdi UFC	1–3	Kaposvár
Balatonlelle SE	0–4	Paks
Let's Do It Technoroll	0–1	Barcs
Budaörs	1–2	Honvéd
Újbuda FC	1–8	Ferencváros
Videoton-Puskás Akadémia	0–4	MTK
Tököl VSK	2–4	Vasas
Dunaharaszti MTK	2–1	MTK II
Honvéd II	2–1	Tatabánya
BKV Előre	1–0 (a.e.t.)	Dunakanyar-Vác
Rákospalota	3–0	Szigetszentmiklósi TC
Békéscsaba	1–2	Kecskemét
Ceglédi VSE	1–0	Makói FC
Egri FC	2–0	Mezőkövesd-Zsóry SE
Putnok VSE	2–1	Felsőtárkány SC
Pétervására SE	0–3	Bőcs
Tiszakanyár SE	2–1	DVSC-DEAC
Bárándi KSE	1–2	Nagyecsed RSE
Tiszabecs LC	4–1	Nyíregyháza
Újpest	–	Szigetszentmiklósi TK
Soproni VSE	0–1	Gyirmót

== Round of 32 ==
Entering this stage of the competition were the 28 winners from the previous round and the four clubs which competed in Europe this season. These matches took place between 6 October 2010 and 2 November 2010.

Team 1	Score	Team 2
Honvéd II	1–2	Zalaegerszeg
Putnok VSE	1–3 (a.e.t.)	Honvéd
BKV Előre	1–2	Siófok
Pécs	0–1	Paks
Ceglédi VSE	0–5	MTK
Bőcs	1–5	Újpest
Tisza Volán SC	1–3	Vasas
Dunaharaszti MTK	1–2 (a.e.t.)	Kaposvár
Nagyecsed RSE	1–1 (7–8 p.)	Debrecen
Tiszakanyár SE	0–3	Kecskemét
Lipót SE	2–5	Haladás
Tiszabecs LC	1–3	Egri FC
Barcs	1–7	Győr
Gyirmót	1–1 (2–3 p.)	Pápa
Rákospalota	0–5	Ferencváros
Bajai LSE	2–4	Videoton

== Final stage ==
=== Bracket ===
First round
1	Debrecen	0	1	1
16	Kecskemét	3	3	6
8	Siófok	3	1	4
9	Ferencváros	1	2	3
5	MTK (a)	0	1	1
12	Győr	0	1	1
4	Vasas	0	0	0
13	ZTE	6	3	9
6	Pápa	1	1	2
11	Újpest	3	3	6
3	Kaposvár	1	1	2
14	Paks	0	0	0
7	Egri FC	0	0	0
10	Honvéd	3	7	10
2	Videoton	3	3	6
15	Haladás	0	1	1

Quarter-finals
Kecskemét	5	1	6
Siófok	1	1	2
MTK	0	1	1
ZTE	0	2	2
Újpest	2	2	4
Kaposvár	3	2	5
Honvéd	1	0	1
Videoton	1	4	5

Semi-finals
Kecskemét	5	0	5
ZTE	1	0	1
Kaposvár	0	0	0
Videoton	1	4	5

Final
Kecskemét	3
Videoton	2

== Round of 16 ==
The sixteen winners of the previous round were drawn into eight two-legged matches. The winners on aggregate advanced to the next round. The first leg matches were played on 9–10 November 2010 with the exception of Kaposvár-Paks, which was played on 16 February 2011; the return legs were played on 1–2 March 2011 with the exception of Honvéd–Eger, which was played on 23 November 2010.

Team 1	Agg.	Team 2	1st leg	2nd leg
Egri FC	0–10	Honvéd	0–3	0–7
MTK	1–1 (a)	Győr	0–0	1–1
Pápa	2–6	Újpest	1–3	1–3
Videoton	6–1	Haladás	3–0	3–1
Vasas	0–9	ZTE	0–6	0–3
Debrecen	1–6	Kecskemét	0–3	1–3
Siófok	4–3	Ferencváros	3–1	1–2
Kaposvár	2–0	Paks	1–0	1–0

== Quarter-finals ==
As in the previous round, ties were played over two legs. The winners advanced to the semi-finals. The first legs were played on 8–9 March 2011, with the return legs to be played on 15–16 March 2011.

Team 1	Agg.	Team 2	1st leg	2nd leg
MTK	1–2	Zalaegerszeg	0–0	1–2
Újpest	4–5	Kaposvár	2–3	2–2
Kecskemét	6–2	Siófok	5–1	1–1
Honvéd	1–5	Videoton	1–1	0–4

=== First leg ===
8 March 2011
18:00 (UTC+1)

MTK	0–0	ZTE
	Report (in Hungarian)

Hidegkuti Nándor Stadium, Budapest
Referee: István Vad II

8 March 2011
18:00 (UTC+1)

Újpest	2–3	Kaposvár
Lázár 33'; Ahjupera 60'	Report (in Hungarian)	Grumić 20', 38'; Balázs 64'

Szusza Ferenc Stadium, Budapest
Referee: Viktor Kassai

9 March 2011
17:00 (UTC+1)

Kecskemét	5–1	Siófok
Tököli 8'; Vujović 10', 23'; Savić 41'; Fehér 49' (o.g.)	Report (in Hungarian)	Márton 46'

Széktói Stadion, Kecskemét
Attendance: 1,500
Referee: Roland Veizer

9 March 2011
18:00 (UTC+1)

Honvéd	1–1	Videoton
Zelenka 22'	Report (in Hungarian)	Nikolić 71'

Bozsik Stadion, Budapest
Referee: Zsolt Szabó

=== Second leg ===
15 March 2011
14:00 (UTC+1)

Siófok	1–1	Kecskemét
Melczer 15'	Report (in Hungarian)	Dosso 12'

Révész Street Stadium, Siófok
Attendance: 150
Referee: Katalin Kulcsár

Kecskemét won 6–2 on aggregate.

15 March 2011
17:00 (UTC+1)

ZTE	2–1	MTK
Delic 36'; Turkovs 48'	Report (in Hungarian)	Könyves 43'

ZTE Arena, Zalaegerszeg
Attendance: 4,000
Referee: Viktor Kassai

ZTE won 2–1 on aggregate.

15 March 2011
18:00 (UTC+1)

Videoton	4–0	Honvéd
Gosztonyi 3'; Lencse 27', 80'; Gyurcsó 90'	Report (in Hungarian)

Stadion Sóstói, Székesfehérvár
Attendance: 2,000
Referee: Zoltán Iványi

Videoton won 5–1 on aggregate.

16 March 2011
17:00 (UTC+1)

Kaposvár	2–2	Újpest
Zsók 20'; Kulcsár 73'	Report (in Hungarian)	Rajczi (red card) 47'; Böőr 62'; Sitku 86'; Mitrović (red card) 88'

Stadion Kaposvár Rákóczi, Kaposvár
Attendance: 600
Referee: Péter Solymosi

Kaposvár won 5–4 on aggregate.

== Semi-finals ==
Ties in the semi-finals were also played over two legs.

Team 1	Agg.	Team 2	1st leg	2nd leg
Kecskemét	5–1	Zalaegerszeg	5–1	0–0
Kaposvár	0–5	Videoton	0–1	0–4

=== First leg ===
19 April 2011
18:00 (UTC+2)

Kecskemét	5–1	ZTE
Kethevoama 7', 89'; Tököli 18'; Litsingi 29', 34'	Report (in Hungarian)	Kamber 79'

Széktói Stadion, Kecskemét
Attendance: 2,200
Referee: Alvaro Garcia Miquel (Chile)

20 April 2011
18:00 (UTC+2)

Kaposvár	0–1	Videoton
	Report (in Hungarian)	Lipták 48'; Farkas (red card) 72'

Stadion Kaposvár Rákóczi, Kaposvár
Attendance: 4,000
Referee: Mihály Fábián

=== Second leg ===
3 May 2011
17:00 (UTC+2)

Zalaegerszeg	0–0	Kecskemét
	Report (in Hungarian)

ZTE Arena, Zalaegerszeg
Referee: Gyöngyi Gaál

Kecskemét won 5–1 on aggregate.

4 May 2011
17:00 (UTC+2)

Videoton	4–0	Kaposvár
Vasiljević 11', 56'; Vaskó 17'; Nikolić 90+2'	Report (in Hungarian)

Stadion Sóstói, Székesfehérvár
Attendance: 1,200
Referee: Péter Solymosi

Videoton won 5–0 on aggregate.

== Final ==
17 May 2011
19:00 (UTC+2)

Kecskemét	3–2	Videoton
Foxi 2', 14', 80'	Report (in Hungarian)	Čukić 48' (o.g.); Nikolić 82'

Stadium Puskás Ferenc, Budapest
Attendance: 5,000
Referee: Zoltán Iványi

Magyar Kupa
2010–11 Winners
Kecskemét
1st Title

== Top goalscorers ==
Rank	Scorer	Club	Goals
1	(Hungary) László Kormos	Bajai LSE	6
1	(Central African Republic) Foxi Kethevoama	Kecskemét	6
3	(Hungary) Ferenc Germán	Győrszemere KSK	5
3	(Hungary) Attila Simon	ZTE	5
3	(Hungary) Ádám Hamar	Egri FC	5
3	(Hungary) Gergő Lovrencsics	Pécs	5
3	(Serbia) Dušan Vasiljević	Videoton	5
3	(Serbia) Nemanja Nikolić	Videoton	5
9	(Hungary) László Ascsillán	Nagyecsed RSE	4
9	(Hungary) Dávid Kovács	Újbuda TC	4
9	(Hungary) Tibor Tisza	Újpest	4
9	(Hungary) Norbert Tóth	Gyirmót	4
9	(Hungary) Gábor Kaszai	Dunaharaszti MTK	4
9	(Ukraine) Replyuk Mykhaylo	Tiszabecs LC	4
9	(Republic of the Congo) Francis Litsingi	Kecskemét	4
9	(Bosnia and Herzegovina) Emil Miljković	Ferencváros	4

Source: MLSZ (Click on "Góllövő lista", from the third combo box on the left select "Magyar Kupa", from the fourth combo box select "8. forduló" and click on "Lekérés indítása")

== See also ==
- 2010–11 Nemzeti Bajnokság I
- 2010–11 Nemzeti Bajnokság II
- 2010–11 Nemzeti Bajnokság III
- 2010–11 Ligakupa
