= Ádám Fekete =

Hungarian footballer

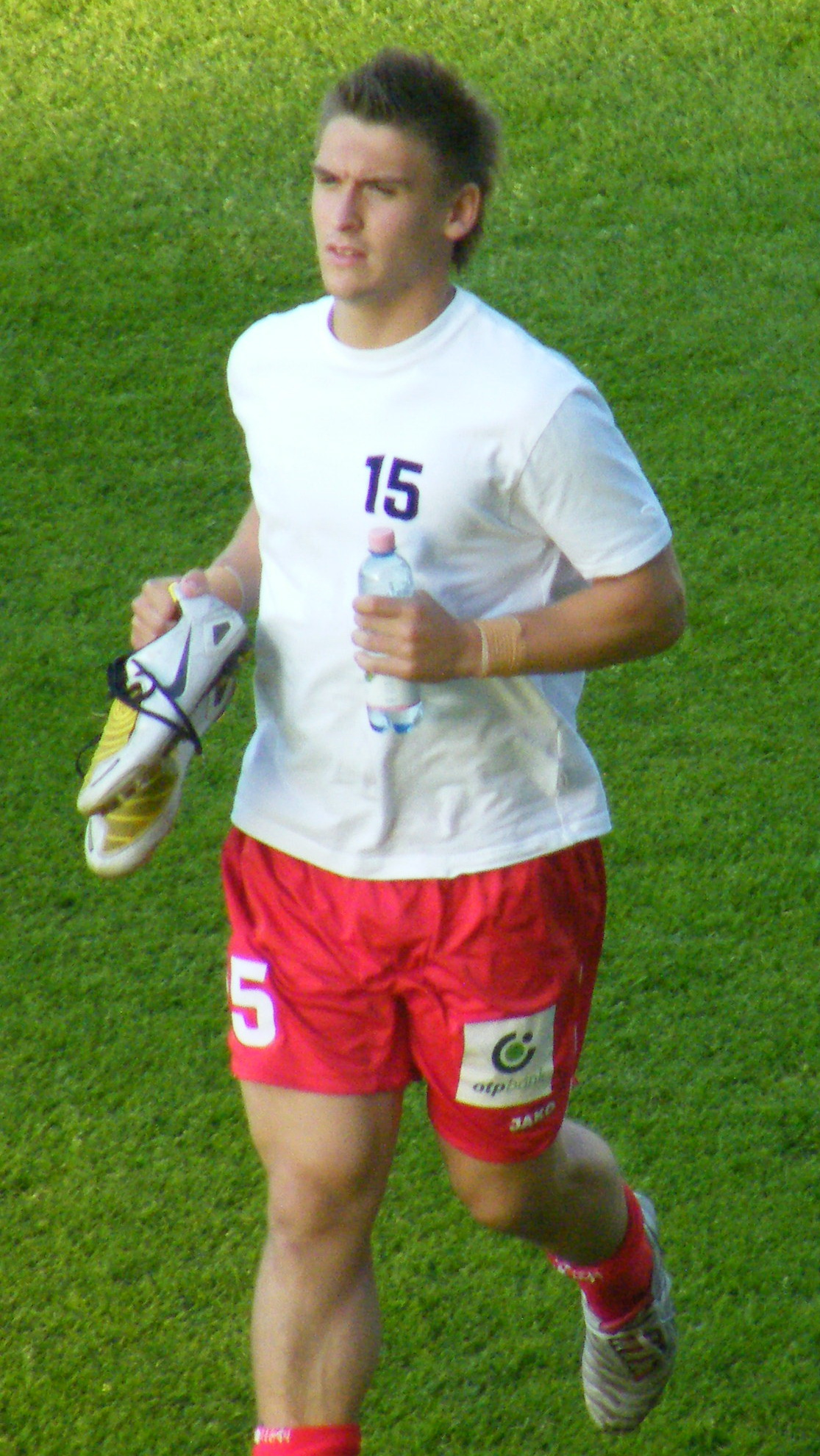

Personal information
- Full name: Ádám Fekete
- Date of birth: 22 January 1988 (age 38)
- Place of birth: Nyíregyháza, Hungary
- Position: Forward

Team information
- Current team: Kazincbarcikai
- Number: 26

Youth career
- 2004–2005: Stoke City

Senior career*
Years	Team	Apps	(Gls)
2006–2011	Nyíregyháza	21	(2)
2006–2007	→ Baktalórántháza (loan)	12	(0)
2007–2008	→ Tuzsér (loan)	26	(2)
2011	→ Szigetszentmiklós (loan)	14	(7)
2011–2012	Szigetszentmiklós	12	(10)
2012–2013	Leoben	6	(0)
2013–2015	Szigetszentmiklós	51	(4)
2015–2019	Balmazújváros	73	(12)
2019–	Kazincbarcikai	2	(0)
- * Club domestic league appearances and goals as of 22:15, 16 October 2019 (UTC)

Ádám Fekete (born 22 January 1988) is a footballer who plays in Hungary for Kazincbarcikai SC. He has previously played for English club Stoke City in their youth Academy before returning to play professional football with his home town club.

== Career statistics ==
Appearances and goals by club, season and competition
Club	Season	League			Cup		League Cup		Europe		Total	
Club	Season	Division	Apps	Goals	Apps	Goals	Apps	Goals	Apps	Goals	Apps	Goals
Baktalórántháza	2005–06	Nemzeti Bajnokság II	12	0	0	0	—		—		12	0
Tuzsér	2007–08	Nemzeti Bajnokság II	26	2	0	0	—		—		26	2
Nyíregyháza
Nyíregyháza	2006–07	Nemzeti Bajnokság II	3	0	0	0	-	-	—		3	0
Nyíregyháza	2008–09	Nemzeti Bajnokság I	6	1	0	0	2	1	—		8	2
Nyíregyháza	2009–10	Nemzeti Bajnokság I	7	1	1	0	9	0	—		17	1
Nyíregyháza	2010–11	Nemzeti Bajnokság II	5	0	2	0	—		—		7	0
Nyíregyháza	Total		21	2	3	0	11	1	0	0	35	3
Leoben
Leoben	2011–12	Austrian Football Championship	14	3	0	0	—		—		14	3
Leoben	2012–13	Austrian Football Championship	6	0	1	0	—		—		7	0
Leoben	Total		20	3	1	0	0	0	0	0	21	3
Szigetszentmiklós
Szigetszentmiklós	2010–11	Nemzeti Bajnokság II	14	7	0	0	-	-	—		14	7
Szigetszentmiklós	2011–12	Nemzeti Bajnokság II	12	10	2	1	—		—		14	11
Szigetszentmiklós	2012–13	Nemzeti Bajnokság II	13	2	0	0	—		—		13	2
Szigetszentmiklós	2013–14	Nemzeti Bajnokság II	24	2	1	0	8	1	—		33	3
Szigetszentmiklós	2014–15	Nemzeti Bajnokság II	14	0	2	2	7	4	—		23	6
Szigetszentmiklós	Total		77	21	5	3	15	5	0	0	97	29
Balmazújváros
Balmazújváros	2015–16	Nemzeti Bajnokság II	18	2	2	2	—		—		20	4
Balmazújváros	2016–17	Nemzeti Bajnokság II	29	8	0	0	—		—		29	8
Balmazújváros	2017–18	Nemzeti Bajnokság I	8	2	1	0	—		—		9	2
Balmazújváros	2018–19	Nemzeti Bajnokság II	17	0	0	0	—		—		17	0
Balmazújváros	Total		72	12	3	2	0	0	0	0	75	14
Career total			228	38	12	5	26	6	0	0	266	49

Updated to games played as of 19 May 2019.
