= Krisztián Kollega =

Hungarian footballer

Personal information
- Date of birth: 5 October 1985 (age 41)
- Place of birth: Pécs, Hungarian People's Republic
- Position: Midfielder

Team information
- Current team: Érdi VSE

Senior career*
Years	Team	Apps	(Gls)
2003–2007	Kaposvári Rákóczi FC	2	(0)
2005–2006	→Pécsi MFC (loan)		
2006–2007	→Kaposvölgye VSC (loan)	29	(1)
2007–2009	Barcsi SC	48	(10)
2010–2012	Budaörsi SC	43	(11)
2012	Mississauga Eagles FC		
2012–2014	Szigetszentmiklósi TK	65	(4)
2015–2016	FC Ajka	10	(0)
2016–2019	Kaposvári Rákóczi FC	79	(20)
2019–	Érdi VSE	31	(13)
- * Club domestic league appearances and goals as of 4 November 2020

Krisztián Kollega (born October 5, 1985) is a Hungarian footballer plays with Érdi VSE in the Nemzeti Bajnokság III.

== Career ==
Kollega began his career in 2003 at the youth level with Kaposvári Rákóczi FC, and in 2006 made his first team debut in the Nemzeti Bajnokság I. Throughout his time with Kaposvari he was loaned out to Pécsi MFC, and Kaposvölgye VSC. In 2007, he played in the Nemzeti Bajnokság II with Barcsi SC, and later with Budaörsi SC in 2010. In 2012, he played abroad in the Canadian Soccer League with Mississauga Eagles FC.

The following season he returned to Hungary to sign with Szigetszentmiklósi TK, and after played with FC Ajka in 2015. He returned to Kaposvari in 2016 to play in the Nemzeti Bajnokság III. In 2019, he signed with Érdi VSE.

== Later career ==
After playing for Érdi VSE between 2019 and 2022, Kollega joined Marcali VFC in July 2022. He subsequently transferred to Juta SE on 26 January 2024. During the 2024–25 season, he recorded 39 goals in 30 appearances across competitions, according to the Hungarian Football Federation's official database.
