= Árpád Majoros =

Hungarian footballer (born 1983)

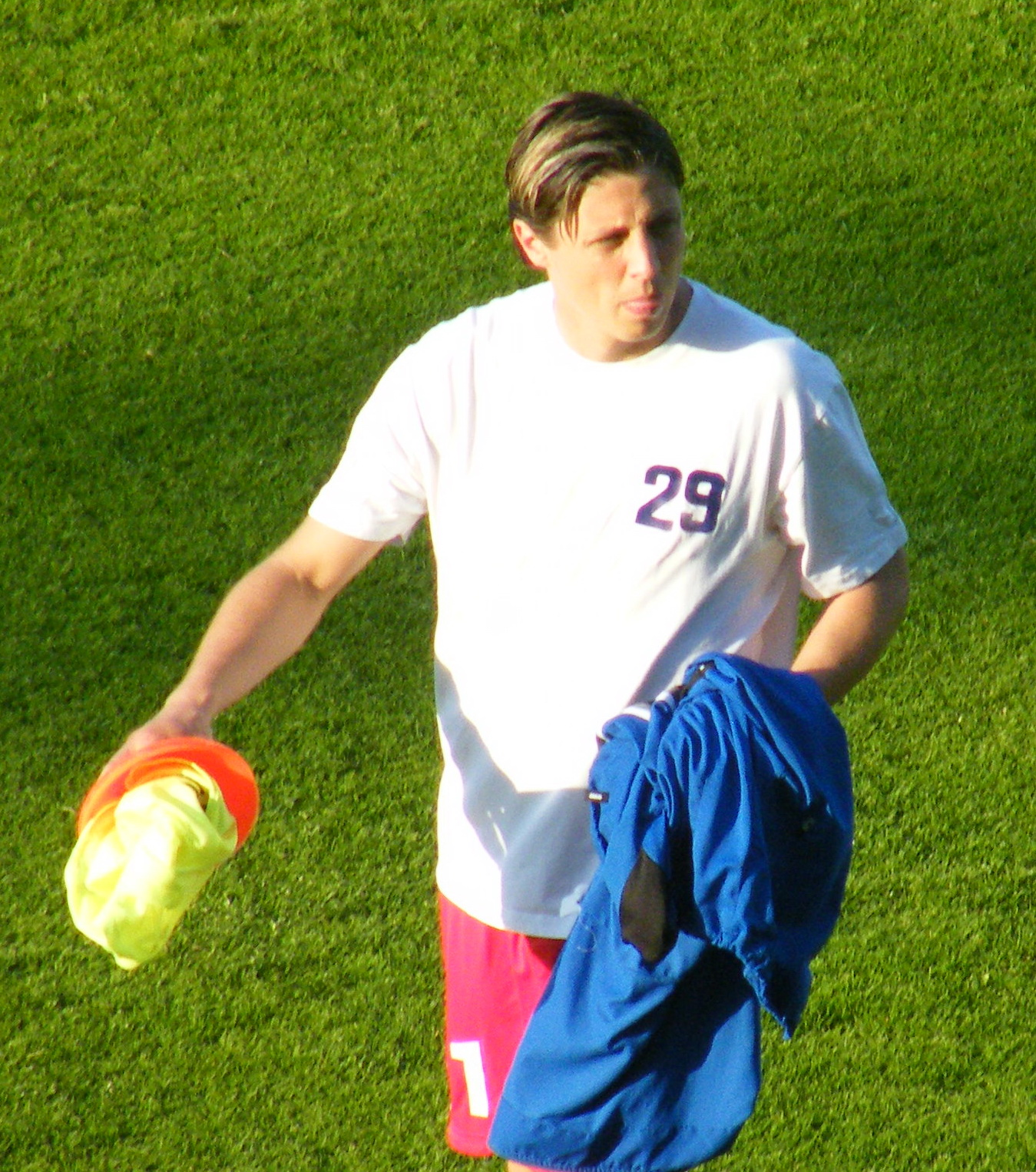

Personal information
- Date of birth: 21 December 1983 (age 42)
- Place of birth: Szolnok, Hungary
- Height: 1.82 m (6 ft 0 in)
- Position: Midfielder

Team information
- Current team: Jamina

Youth career
- 2003: Szabadkígyós
- 2003–2005: Orosháza

Senior career*
Years	Team	Apps	(Gls)
2005–2007	Vasas	46	(0)
2007–2008	Zalaegerszeg	2	(0)
2008–2009	Cracovia	12	(0)
2009	Nyíregyháza	5	(0)
2009–2010	SZTK	14	(2)
2010–2012	Vasas	14	(0)
2010–2011	→ SZTK (loan)	28	(9)
2012–2013	Békéscsaba	31	(5)
2013–2014	BKV Előre	9	(2)
2014	SZTK	11	(1)
2014–2015	Cegléd	20	(1)
2015–2017	Vác	31	(2)
2017–2018	Pénzügyőr	6	(0)
2018–2020	Mezőmegyer	6	(2)
2020	Kétegyházi		
2020–	Jamina		

International career
2005	Hungary	1	(0)
- * Club domestic league appearances and goals as of 20 December 2023

Árpád Majoros (born 21 December 1983 in Szolnok) is a Hungarian professional footballer who plays as a midfielder for Jamina.
