= Csaba Somogyi =

Hungarian footballer

Personal information
- Full name: Csaba Somogyi
- Date of birth: 7 April 1985 (age 41)
- Place of birth: Dunaújváros, Hungary
- Height: 1.90 m (6 ft 3 in)
- Position: Goalkeeper

Team information
- Current team: SV Großpetersdorf

Senior career*
Years	Team	Apps	(Gls)
2003–2007	Győr ETO	3	(0)
2007	→ Integrál-DAC (loan)	5	(0)
2008–2009	Integrál-DAC	13	(0)
2009–2010	Hévíz	6	(0)
2010–2011	Rákospalota	43	(0)
2011–2013	Fulham	0	(0)
2013	→ Dartford (loan)	8	(0)
2014–2016	Gyirmót	46	(0)
2016–2017	Szolnok	15	(0)
2017	Budapest Honvéd	0	(0)
2017–2018	Budafok	21	(0)
2018–2019	Mosonmagyaróvár	23	(0)
2019–	SV Großpetersdorf	13	(0)
- * Club domestic league appearances and goals as of 26 November 2017

Csaba Somogyi (born 7 April 1985) is a Hungarian football player who plays as a goalkeeper for Austrian club SV OK Haus Großpetersdorf.

== Career ==
After playing for several years in his native Hungary, on 8 July 2011 Somogyi signed for English club Fulham from Hungarian side Rákospalotai EAC on a one-year deal, with the option to extend his contract by a further year until 2013, after having impressed the new Fulham manager Martin Jol during an earlier trial at Jol's former club Ajax.

Somogyi made the bench for the first time as substitute goalkeeper for Fulham's away Premier League game against West Bromwich Albion at The Hawthorns on 1 January 2013.

On 28 March 2013, Somogyi joined Conference National side Dartford on loan until the end of the season. He kept a clean sheet on his debut, a 0–0 away draw with Newport County.

Somogyi was one of twelve players released by Fulham at the end of the 2012–2013 Premier League season.

In August 2019, Somogyi joined Austrian club SV OK Haus Großpetersdorf.
