= 2010–11 Nemzeti Bajnokság II =

Nemzeti Bajnokság II
- Season: 2010–11
- Champions: Pécs (West); Diósgyőr (East)
- Promoted: Pécs (West); Diósgyőr (East)
- Relegated: Veszprém (West); Honvéd II (West); Kaposvölgye (West); Hajdúböszörmény (East); Orosháza (East); Bőcs (East)
- All statistics correct as of 15 July 2011.

The 2010–11 Nemzeti Bajnokság II was Hungary's the 113th season of the Nemzeti Bajnokság II, the second tier of the Hungarian football league system.

== League table ==
=== Eastern group ===
Pos	Team	Pld	W	D	L	GF	GA	GD	Pts	Promotion or relegation
1	Diósgyőr (C, P)	30	22	2	6	66	23	+43	68	Promotion to Nemzeti Bajnokság I
2	Mezőkövesd	30	19	5	6	48	20	+28	62	
3	Nyíregyháza	30	18	6	6	66	23	+43	60	
4	Vác	30	18	6	6	47	27	+20	60	
5	MTK II (Note: MTK refused to participate in NB III with reserve team after the first team was eliminated from NB I.)	30	16	7	7	48	34	+14	55	Not competed in any division next season
6	Békéscsaba	30	11	10	9	45	40	+5	43	
7	Vecsés	30	10	8	12	36	37	−1	38	
8	Debrecen II	30	10	7	13	37	45	−8	37	
9	Újpest II	30	9	8	13	43	58	−15	35	
10	Rákospalota	30	9	6	15	30	38	−8	33	
11	Kazincbarcika	30	8	8	14	37	60	−23	31 (Note: Kazincbarcika were docked 1 point.)	
12	Cegléd	30	8	6	16	46	61	−15	30	
13	Makó (R)	30	8	6	16	30	54	−24	30	Relegation to Nemzeti Bajnokság III
14	Hajdúböszörmény (R)	30	7	9	14	29	42	−13	30	Relegation to Nemzeti Bajnokság III
15	Orosháza	30	7	9	14	32	52	−20	30	
16	Bőcs (Note: Bőcs handed over the license to Balmazújváros.) (R)	28	5	5	18	27	53	−26	20	Relegation to Megyei Bajnokság III

Source: Soccerway
Rules for classification: 1) Points; 2) Matches won; 3) Goal difference; 4) Goals scored; 5) Head-to-head points; 6) Head-to-head goal difference; 7) Head-to-head away goals scored; 8) Fair play ranking; 9) Drawing of lots.
(C) Champions; (P) Promoted; (R) Relegated

=== Western group ===
Pos	Team	Pld	W	D	L	GF	GA	GD	Pts	Promotion or relegation
1	Pécs (C, P)	30	21	3	6	55	17	+38	66	Promotion to Nemzeti Bajnokság I
2	Gyirmót	30	19	6	5	62	29	+33	63	
3	Videoton II	30	18	4	8	58	32	+26	58	
4	Baja	30	17	3	10	51	38	+13	54	
5	BKV Előre	30	13	9	8	38	37	+1	48	
6	Ajka	30	13	7	10	47	35	+12	46	
7	Tatabánya	30	13	7	10	47	39	+8	46	
8	Kozármisleny	30	13	6	11	41	37	+4	45	
9	Győr II	30	13	3	14	42	47	−5	42	
10	Szigetszentmiklós	30	12	6	12	45	40	+5	42	
11	Budaörs	30	11	8	11	42	41	+1	41	
12	Ferencváros II	30	10	4	16	36	35	+1	34	
13	Barcs (R)	30	9	6	15	35	61	−26	33	Relegation to Nemzeti Bajnokság III
14	Veszprém	30	10	0	20	33	54	−21	30	
15	Honvéd II	30	4	6	20	24	57	−33	18	
16	Kaposvölgye (R)	30	4	2	24	21	78	−57	14	Relegation to Megyei Bajnokság I

Source: Soccerway
Rules for classification: 1) Points; 2) Matches won; 3) Goal difference; 4) Goals scored; 5) Head-to-head points; 6) Head-to-head goal difference; 7) Head-to-head away goals scored; 8) Fair play ranking; 9) Drawing of lots.
(C) Champions; (P) Promoted; (R) Relegated

== See also ==
- 2010–11 Magyar Kupa
- 2010–11 Nemzeti Bajnokság I
- 2010–11 Nemzeti Bajnokság III
