= Krisztián Lisztes =

Krisztián Lisztes may refer to:

- Krisztián Lisztes (footballer, born 1976), Hungarian football midfielder
- Krisztián Lisztes (footballer, born 2005), Hungarian football midfielder and son of the above
