= Krisztián Nagy =

Krisztián Nagy may refer to:

- Krisztián Nagy (footballer, born 1992), Hungarian football player
- Krisztián Nagy (footballer, born 1995), Hungarian footballer
