= Márk Mészáros =

Hungarian footballer

Personal information
- Date of birth: 26 February 1988 (age 38)
- Place of birth: Miskolc, Hungary
- Height: 1.80 m (5 ft 11 in)
- Position: Left back

Team information
- Current team: Jamina SE

Youth career
- 2002–2006: Újpest

Senior career*
Years	Team	Apps	(Gls)
2006–2008	Újpest	13	(1)
2008–2011	Pápa	27	(1)
2010	→ REAC (loan)	9	(0)
2011	Kazincbarcikai	10	(0)
2011–2013	Nyíregyháza Spartacus	24	(2)
2013	Soproni	9	(0)
2013–2014	Nyírbátor		
2014–2017	Szeged	72	(3)
2017–2022	Békéscsaba	83	(7)
2022–	Jamina SE	0	(0)

International career
2006–2007	Hungary U-19		
- * Club domestic league appearances and goals as of 3 October 2021

Márk Mészáros (born 26 February 1988) is a Hungarian football player who plays for Jamina SE.
