= Zsolt Kovács (footballer) =

Hungarian footballer

Personal information
- Full name: Zsolt Kovács
- Date of birth: 4 July 1986 (age 40)
- Place of birth: Szombathely, Hungary
- Height: 1.81 m (5 ft 11 in)
- Position: Defender

Team information
- Current team: Büki TK
- Number: 5

Senior career*
Years	Team	Apps	(Gls)
2006–2011	Szombathelyi Haladás	26	(0)
2010	→ Büki TK (loan)	12	(0)
2011–	Büki TK	0	(0)
- * Club domestic league appearances and goals as of 3 March 2010

Zsolt Kovács (born 4 July 1986) is a Hungarian football player, who is currently playing for Büki TK.
