= Máté Tóth (footballer, born 1991) =

Hungarian footballer

Personal information
- Full name: Máté Tóth
- Date of birth: 22 January 1991 (age 35)
- Place of birth: Budapest, Hungary
- Height: 1.87 m (6 ft 2 in)
- Position: Centre back

Team information
- Current team: Sopron
- Number: 69

Youth career
- 2003–2005: III. Kerület
- 2005–2007: Ferencváros
- 2007–2008: Újpest
- 2008: Empoli

Senior career*
Years	Team	Apps	(Gls)
2008–2009	Győr	1	(0)
2008–2009	→ Győr II	6	(1)
2008–2012	Rákospalota	27	(1)
2011	→ Hradec Králové (loan)	0	(0)
2012–2013	Vasas	5	(0)
2013	BKV Előre	13	(0)
2013–	Sopron	10	(0)

International career
2008–2009	Hungary U-19	3	(1)
- * Club domestic league appearances and goals as of 27 October 2013

Máté Tóth (born 22 January 1991 in Budapest) is a Hungarian football player who plays for Vasas SC. From 2012 Augustus played for REAC Budapest.

== Career ==
Starting out with Budapest outfit III. Kerületi TUE, he moved on to Sheffield United's link club Ferencvárosi TC and then made a switch to their arch rivals Újpest FC. Máté's talents then saw him transferred to Italian side Empoli F.C., but he failed to settle and switched back to his home land in July with Győri. Moment Club is REAC (Rákospalotai Egyettértés Atlétikai Club, Budapest ) - middle defender.

At 188 cm he is an imposing prospect but also blessed with all the qualities of a modern-day defender. The Hungary under 19 International is an A.C. Milan supporter, and lists Rossoneri stalwart Alessandro Nesta as his idol. Tottenham Hotspur F.C. are also said to be keen to have a look at Máté, but Steve Rowley brokered a deal first.
