= Balázs Molnár =

Hungarian footballer (born 1977)

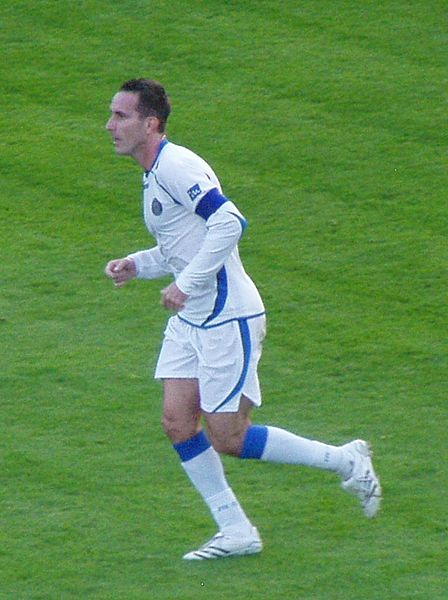

Personal information
- Date of birth: 1 July 1977 (age 49)
- Place of birth: Zalaegerszeg, Hungary
- Height: 1.87 m (6 ft 2 in)
- Position: Defensive midfielder

Team information
- Current team: Zalaegerszeg (manager)

Youth career
- 1993–1994: Zala Volán
- 1994–1995: Zalaegerszegi TE

Senior career*
| Years | Team | Apps | (Gls) |
| 1995–1996 | Szombathelyi TK Raszter | 14 | (1) |
| 1996–1999 | Zalaegerszegi TE | 84 | (2) |
| 1999–2000 | Espanyol | 4 | (0) |
| 2000 | Elche | 6 | (0) |
| 2000–2001 | FC Tatabánya | 14 | (0) |
| 2001–2004 | Zalaegerszegi TE | 77 | (3) |
| 2004–2005 | Ankaraspor | 34 | (1) |
| 2005–2008 | Zalaegerszegi TE | 59 | (0) |
| 2008–2011 | Szombathelyi Haladás | 65 | (1) |
| 2011 | Zalaegerszegi TE | 0 | (0) |
| 2011–2012 | Gyirmót SE | 24 | (0) |
| Total | | 381 | (8) |

International career
| 1998–2000 | Hungary U-21 | 11 | (0) |
| 2002–2006 | Hungary | 14 | (0) |

Managerial career
- 2013-2018: Zalaegerszeg (academy coach)
- 2018-: Zalaegerszeg (academy director)
- 2021: Zalaegerszeg (assistant manager)
- 2022: Zalaegerszeg
- * Club domestic league appearances and goals

Balázs Molnár (born 1 July 1977) is a Hungarian former football coach and a former defensive midfielder. He is the head coach of Zalaegerszeg.

== Coaching career ==
Molnár was appointed manager of Zalaegerszeg on 29 March 2022, after working at the club as the academy director.

== Honours ==
Zalaegerszegi TE

- Nemzeti Bajnokság I: 2002
- Szuperkupa: runner-up 2002

Espanyol

- Copa del Rey: 2000
- Ciutat de Barcelona Trophy: 2000
