= Péter Balassa =

Hungarian footballer

Personal information
- Date of birth: 18 March 1975 (age 51)
- Place of birth: Sárvár, Hungary
- Height: 1.85 m (6 ft 1 in)
- Position: Defender

Senior career*
Years	Team	Apps	(Gls)
1993–2000	Szombathelyi Haladás	98	(9)
1995	→ Püspökmolnári KSK (loan)	?	(?)
1996	→ Keszthelyi HSE (loan)	?	(?)
1996	→ Körmend FC (loan)	?	(?)
2000–2001	Debreceni VSC	?	(?)
2001–2002	FC Fehérvár	?	(?)
2002–2009	Szombathelyi Haladás	86	(11)
- * Club domestic league appearances and goals

Péter Balassa (born 18 March 1975) is a Hungarian football player and politician. Balassa retired at end of 2008–2009 season, he became a Member of Parliament in 2022.

Balassa has played in the Hungarian NB I for Videoton FC Fehérvár during the 2000–01 season.

== Haladas ==
From 2005 to 2008, he has spent 3 seasons with Szombathelyi Haladás appearing in 57 matches and scoring 10 goals for the Szombathely-based team in the NB II; and in the season 2007/08, he managed to win the NB II and hence, Haladas was promoted to the NB I for the 2008/09 season.

== Honours ==
Hungarian second division:
Winner: 2007/08
