= László Kormos =

Hungarian footballer

Personal information
- Full name: László Kormos
- Date of birth: 24 June 1986 (age 40)
- Place of birth: Mezőtúr, Hungary
- Height: 1.89 m (6 ft 2 1/2 in)
- Position: Striker

Team information
- Current team: Cegléd
- Number: 19

Youth career
- 2002–2005: Túrkeve

Senior career*
Years	Team	Apps	(Gls)
2005–2007	Túrkeve	17	(15)
2007–2010	Kecskemét	37	(11)
2009	→ Szolnok (loan)	5	(0)
2010	→ Vecsés (loan)	13	(6)
2010–2012	Baja	53	(22)
2012–	Cegléd	48	(18)
- * Club domestic league appearances and goals as of 1 June 2014

László Kormos (born 24 June 1986 in Mezőtúr) is a Hungarian football player who currently plays for Ceglédi VSE.
