= Péter Vörös =

Hungarian footballer

Personal information
- Full name: Péter Vörös
- Date of birth: 14 December 1977 (age 48)
- Place of birth: Budapest, Hungary
- Height: 1.76 m (5 ft 9 in)
- Position: Midfielder

Team information
- Current team: Pálhalma SE

Youth career
- 1991–1996: MTK Budapest FC

Senior career*
Years	Team	Apps	(Gls)
1996–1997	Veszprémi LC	2	(0)
1997–1998	Békéscsaba 1912 Előre SE	23	(0)
1998–2000	Szeged LC	44	(10)
2000–2001	MTK Budapest FC	15	(1)
2001–2002	Lombard-Pápa TFC	?	(?)
2002–2003	BKV Előre SC	36	(3)
2003–2004	BFC Siófok	30	(1)
2004–2006	Lombard-Pápa TFC	20	(1)
2005	→ Johor FC (loan)	?	(?)
2006–2007	Viktoria Aschaffenburg	25	(3)
2007	Gyirmót SE	10	(0)
2007–2009	Szombathelyi Haladás	57	(5)
2009–2010	Lokomotiv Tashkent	12	(4)
2010	Kecskeméti TE	7	(0)
2010–2011	Szolnoki MÁV FC	10	(0)
2011–2012	Rákosmenti KSK	6	(1)
2012–	Pálhalma SE	15	(1)

International career
1996–1997	Hungary U-19	6	(0)
1997	Hungary U-20	1	(0)
- * Club domestic league appearances and goals as of 26 July 2012

Péter Vörös (born 14 December 1977) is a Hungarian football player who currently plays for Lokomotiv Tashkent.

== FIFA World Youth Championship ==
In 1997, Péter Vörös was a participant in the FIFA World Youth Championship which was held in Malaysia, where Hungary failed to reach the second round. In this tournament, Péter made his only appearance against Canada where Hungary was defeated by 2–1 in front of 4000 spectators.

== Honours ==
Hungarian Second Division:
Winner: 2008
