= Krisztián Futaki =

Hungarian footballer

Personal information
- Date of birth: 2 February 1979 (age 47)
- Place of birth: Békéscsaba, Hungary
- Height: 1.83 m (6 ft 0 in)
- Position: Defender

Team information
- Current team: Békéscsaba 1912 Előre SE
- Number: 3

Youth career
- 1992–1997: Békéscsaba 1912 Előre SE

Senior career*
| Years | Team | Apps | (Gls) |
| 1997–2003 | Békéscsaba 1912 Előre SE | 56 | (0) |
| 2003–2006 | Gyulai Termál FC | ? | (?) |
| 2006–2008 | Orosháza FC | 19 | (0) |
| 2008– | Békéscsaba 1912 Előre SE | 22 | (0) |
- * Club domestic league appearances and goals

Krisztián Futaki (born 2 February 1979) is a Hungarian football (defender) player who currently plays for Békéscsaba 1912 Előre SE.
