= Attila Menyhárt =

Hungarian footballer

Personal information
- Date of birth: 26 November 1984 (age 41)
- Place of birth: Budapest, Hungary
- Height: 1.73 m (5 ft 8 in)
- Position: Midfielder

Youth career
- 2000–2003: Ferencváros
- 2003–2005: Vecsés

Senior career*
Years	Team	Apps	(Gls)
2005–2008	Vecsés	76	(13)
2008–2010	Kecskemét	15	(1)
2009–2010	→ Vecsés (loan)	23	(5)
2010–2012	Rákospalota	56	(4)
2012–2013	Ferencváros	0	(0)
2012–2013	→ Ferencváros II	4	(0)
2013–2014	Siófok	6	(0)
2014–2015	Vasas	8	(0)
2015–2021	Budaörs	144	(6)
- * Club domestic league appearances and goals

Attila Menyhárt (born 26 November 1984) is a Hungarian former football player.
