= Thiago Maikel =

Brazilian footballer

Personal information
- Full name: Michael Thiago Barbosa de Araujo
- Date of birth: October 31, 1984 (age 42)
- Place of birth: Recife, Brazil
- Height: 1.77 m (5 ft 10 in)
- Position: Midfielder

Senior career*
Years	Team	Apps	(Gls)
2008–2010	Szombathelyi Haladás	5	(0)
2010	Feirense	9	(1)
2010	Guijuelo	5	(0)
2012–2013	US Sandweiler		
2013–2014	FC Jeunesse Canach	23	(3)
- * Club domestic league appearances and goals

Michael Thiago Barbosa de Araujo (born October 31, 1984, in Recife), known as just Thiago Maikel, is a retired Brazilian football player.
