= Zoltán Csontos =

Hungarian footballer

Personal information
- Full name: Zoltán Csontos
- Date of birth: 30 May 1986 (age 40)
- Place of birth: Sopron, Hungary
- Height: 1.73 m (5 ft 8 in)
- Position: Defender

Team information
- Current team: Soproni VSE
- Number: 27

Senior career*
Years	Team	Apps	(Gls)
2004–2008	FC Sopron	19	(0)
2008–2011	Szombathelyi Haladás	40	(1)
2011–	Soproni VSE	24	(0)
- * Club domestic league appearances and goals as of 22 May 2010

Zoltán Csontos (born 30 May 1986) is a Hungarian football player who currently plays for Soproni VSE.

== Honours ==
Hungarian Second Division:
Winner: 2008
