= Barcsi SC =

Hungarian football club

- Full name: Barcsi Előre Sportklub
- Founded: 1910
- Ground: BSC-pálya, Barcs, Hungary
- Capacity: 2,745
- Chairman: Ott József
- Manager: Hamarics Miklós
- League: NB II (western group)
- 2008–09: 12th
| Home colours | Away colours |

Barcsi SC was a Hungarian football club located in Barcs, Hungary. It played in Hungarian National Championship II before 2010. The team's colors were white and red.
