= Szigetszentmiklósi TK =

Hungarian football club

- Full name: Szigetszentmiklósi Testgyakorlók Köre
- Founded: 1922
- Ground: Stadium Sport Street; Szigetszentmiklós, Hungary
- Capacity: 1,200
- Chairman: Péter Becz
- Manager: Zoran Kuntić
- League: Nemzeti Bajnokság III
- 2016–17: Nemzeti Bajnokság III, 3rd
Home colours	Away colours

Szigetszentmiklósi TK is a Hungarian football club located in Szigetszentmiklós, Hungary. It currently plays in Hungarian National Championship III. The team's colors are green and white.

== Honours ==
- Nemzeti Bajnokság III:
  - Winners (1): 2008–09
