= 2013–14 Szombathelyi Haladás season =

Szombathelyi Haladás
2013–14 season
- Chairman: (Hungary) Béla Illés
- Manager: (Hungary) Tamás Artner
- NB 1: 6th
- Hungarian Cup: Round of 16
- Hungarian League Cup: Round of 16
- Top goalscorer: League: (Hungary) András Radó (14); All: (Hungary) András Radó (14)
- Highest home attendance: 6,126 vs Ferencváros (18 May 2014)
- Lowest home attendance: 50 vs Pápa (13 November 2013)
Home colours	Away colours

The 2013–14 season will be Szombathelyi Haladás's 58th competitive season, 6th consecutive season in the OTP Bank Liga and 94th year in existence as a football club.

== First team squad ==
Note: Flags indicate national team as defined under FIFA eligibility rules; some limited exceptions apply. Players may hold more than one non-FIFA nationality.

No.	Pos.	Nation	Player
3	DF	HUN	Zoltán Fehér
5	DF	HUN	Martin Zsirai
6	MF	HUN	Attila Szakály
7	MF	HUN	András Radó
8	MF	HUN	Gábor Nagy
9	FW	HUN	Ádám Hrepka
13	MF	HUN	Bence Gyurján
14	DF	HUN	Gábor Dvorschák
15	DF	HUN	Péter Tóth
22	DF	HUN	Richárd Guzmics
23	DF	HUN	Szabolcs Schimmer

No.	Pos.	Nation	Player
35	DF	SRB	Predrag Bošnjak
37	MF	HUN	Milán Kalász
45	MF	HUN	Márió Németh
46	MF	HUN	Ádám Simon
66	GK	HUN	Dániel Rózsa
68	MF	HUN	Ramon Halmai
69	DF	HUN	Szilárd Devecseri
77	MF	HUN	Zoltán Medgyes
79	MF	HUN	Péter Halmosi
90	MF	HUN	Bence Iszlai

== Transfers ==
=== Summer ===
In: Note: Flags indicate national team as defined under FIFA eligibility rules; some limited exceptions apply. Players may hold more than one non-FIFA nationality.

No.	Pos.	Nation	Player
1	GK	HUN	Dávid Dombó (from Haladás II)
16	FW	HUN	Máté Skriba (loan return from Tatabánya)
35	DF	SRB	Predrag Bošnjak (from Veszprém)
46	MF	HUN	Ádám Simon (loan from (Italy) Palermo)
77	FW	HUN	Zoltán Medgyes (from Haladás II)

Out: Note: Flags indicate national team as defined under FIFA eligibility rules; some limited exceptions apply. Players may hold more than one non-FIFA nationality.

No.	Pos.	Nation	Player
2	MF	HUN	Zoltán Búrány (to Mezőkövesd)
10	MF	HUN	Kornél Kulcsár (loan to Zalaegerszeg)
11	FW	HUN	András Simon (loan return to Győr)
16	FW	HUN	Máté Skriba (loan to Ajka)
19	MF	HUN	Máté Hanzl (loan to Ajka)
20	FW	HUN	Krisztián Kenesei (to Pápa)
26	DF	HUN	Márk Jagodics (loan to Ajka)
30	GK	HUN	Gergő Gőcze (to Pécs)
33	DF	HUN	Márk Farkas (loan to Gyirmót)

=== Winter ===
In: Note: Flags indicate national team as defined under FIFA eligibility rules; some limited exceptions apply. Players may hold more than one non-FIFA nationality.

No.	Pos.	Nation	Player
9	FW	HUN	Ádám Hrepka (from (Israel) Bnei Yehuda)
14	DF	HUN	Gábor Dvorschák (from (Germany) Jena)
75	GK	HUN	László Gyűrű (from (Slovakia) Veľký Meder)
—	FW	HUN	Richárd Czafit (loan return from Körmend)

Out: Note: Flags indicate national team as defined under FIFA eligibility rules; some limited exceptions apply. Players may hold more than one non-FIFA nationality.

No.	Pos.	Nation	Player
4	DF	HUN	Gábor Rajos (to Ajka)
9	FW	HUN	Péter Andorka (to Gyirmót)
10	MF	HUN	Kornél Kulcsár (loan to Pápa)
20	FW	HUN	Roland Ugrai (to Ferencváros)
—	FW	HUN	Richárd Czafit (loan to Balatonfüred)

- List of Hungarian football transfers summer 2013
- List of Hungarian football transfers winter 2013–14

== Statistics ==
=== Appearances and goals ===
Last updated on 1 June 2014.

No.	Pos	Nat	Player	Total		OTP Bank Liga		Hungarian Cup		League Cup	
No.	Pos	Nat	Player	Apps	Goals	Apps	Goals	Apps	Goals	Apps	Goals
3	DF	(Hungary) HUN	Zoltán Fehér	33	4	27	4	1	0	5	0
5	DF	(Hungary) HUN	Martin Zsirai	5	0	1	0	0	0	4	0
6	MF	(Hungary) HUN	Attila Szakály	18	0	13	0	3	0	2	0
7	MF	(Hungary) HUN	András Radó	33	14	29	14	3	0	1	0
8	MF	(Hungary) HUN	Gábor Nagy	35	1	28	1	1	0	6	0
9	FW	(Hungary) HUN	Ádám Hrepka	12	2	10	2	0	0	2	0
13	MF	(Hungary) HUN	Bence Gyurján	34	3	26	1	3	0	5	2
14	DF	(Hungary) HUN	Gábor Dvorschák	6	2	4	2	0	0	2	0
15	DF	(Hungary) HUN	Péter Tóth	26	1	16	0	3	0	7	1
22	DF	(Hungary) HUN	Richárd Guzmics	30	1	26	1	1	0	3	0
23	DF	(Hungary) HUN	Szabolcs Schimmer	33	0	25	0	1	0	7	0
35	DF	(Serbia) SRB	Predrag Bošnjak	34	0	26	0	1	0	7	0
37	MF	(Hungary) HUN	Milán Kalász	5	0	3	0	0	0	2	0
45	MF	(Hungary) HUN	Márió Németh	30	3	25	2	2	0	3	1
46	MF	(Hungary) HUN	Ádám Simon	35	0	26	0	3	0	6	0
66	GK	(Hungary) HUN	Dániel Rózsa	34	-33	30	-31	2	-2	2	0
68	MF	(Hungary) HUN	Ramon Halmai	6	0	1	0	0	0	5	0
69	DF	(Hungary) HUN	Szilárd Devecseri	24	0	19	0	3	0	2	0
77	MF	(Hungary) HUN	Zoltán Medgyes	13	0	10	0	1	0	2	0
79	MF	(Hungary) HUN	Péter Halmosi	30	9	25	6	2	1	3	2
90	MF	(Hungary) HUN	Bence Iszlai	35	0	25	0	3	0	7	0
Youth players:
1	GK	(Hungary) HUN	Dávid Dombó	1	-2	0	0	0	0	1	-2
2	FW	(Hungary) HUN	Ádám Fider	2	0	0	0	0	0	2	0
10	FW	(Hungary) HUN	László Tóth	2	0	0	0	0	0	2	0
10	MF	(Hungary) HUN	Barnabás Rácz	1	0	0	0	0	0	1	0
17	DF	(Hungary) HUN	Zsolt Angyal	3	0	0	0	0	0	3	0
20	DF	(Hungary) HUN	Patrik Füredi	1	0	0	0	0	0	1	0
91	GK	(Hungary) HUN	Roland Mursits	5	-6	0	0	1	0	4	-6
95	GK	(Hungary) HUN	Márton Gyurján	2	-3	0	0	0	0	2	-3
Out to loan:
16	DF	(Hungary) HUN	Bence Jagodics	1	0	0	0	0	0	1	0
Players no longer at the club:
4	MF	(Hungary) HUN	Gábor Rajos	9	0	2	0	2	0	5	0
9	FW	(Hungary) HUN	Péter Andorka	14	8	5	0	3	1	6	7
20	FW	(Hungary) HUN	Roland Ugrai	15	5	12	3	3	2	0	0

=== Top scorers ===
Includes all competitive matches. The list is sorted by shirt number when total goals are equal.

Last updated on 1 June 2014

Position	Nation	Number	Name	OTP Bank Liga	Hungarian Cup	League Cup	Total
1	(Hungary)	7	András Radó	14	0	0	14
2	(Hungary)	79	Péter Halmosi	6	1	2	9
3	(Hungary)	9	Péter Andorka	0	1	7	8
4	(Hungary)	20	Roland Ugrai	3	2	0	5
5	(Hungary)	3	Zoltán Fehér	4	0	0	4
6	(Hungary)	45	Márió Németh	2	0	1	3
7	(Hungary)	13	Bence Gyurján	1	0	2	3
8	(Hungary)	9	Ádám Hrepka	2	0	0	2
9	(Hungary)	14	Gábor Dvorschák	2	0	0	2
10	(Hungary)	8	Gábor Nagy	1	0	0	1
11	(Hungary)	22	Richárd Guzmics	1	0	0	1
12	(Hungary)	15	Péter Tóth	0	0	1	1
/	/	/	Own Goals	1	0	1	2
			TOTALS	37	4	14	55

=== Disciplinary record ===
Includes all competitive matches. Players with 1 card or more included only.

Last updated on 1 June 2014

Position	Nation	Number	Name	OTP Bank Liga		Hungarian Cup		League Cup		Total (Hu Total)	
Position	Nation	Number	Name	Booked	Sent off (straight red)	Booked	Sent off (straight red)	Booked	Sent off (straight red)	Booked	Sent off (straight red)
DF	(Hungary)	3	Zoltán Fehér	6	2	0	0	2	0	8 (6)	2 (2)
DF	(Hungary)	4	Gábor Rajos	0	1	0	0	0	0	0 (0)	1 (1)
DF	(Hungary)	5	Martin Zsirai	0	0	0	0	2	0	2 (0)	0 (0)
MF	(Hungary)	6	Attila Szakály	1	0	0	0	0	0	1 (1)	0 (0)
MF	(Hungary)	7	András Radó	5	0	0	0	0	0	5 (5)	0 (0)
MF	(Hungary)	8	Gábor Nagy	10	0	0	0	2	0	12 (10)	0 (0)
FW	(Hungary)	9	Ádám Hrepka	2	0	0	0	0	0	2 (2)	0 (0)
FW	(Hungary)	9	Péter Andorka	1	0	1	0	1	0	3 (1)	0 (0)
MF	(Hungary)	13	Bence Gyurján	4	0	0	0	0	0	4 (4)	0 (0)
DF	(Hungary)	14	Gábor Dvorschák	1	0	0	0	0	0	1 (1)	0 (0)
DF	(Hungary)	15	Péter Tóth	5	0	1	0	1	0	7 (5)	0 (0)
DF	(Hungary)	16	Bence Jagodics	0	0	0	0	1	0	1 (0)	0 (0)
FW	(Hungary)	20	Roland Ugrai	3	1	1	0	0	0	4 (3)	1 (1)
DF	(Hungary)	22	Richárd Guzmics	8	1	0	1	1	0	9 (8)	2 (1)
DF	(Hungary)	23	Szabolcs Schimmer	1	0	0	0	0	0	1 (1)	0 (0)
DF	(Serbia)	35	Predrag Bošnjak	6	0	0	1	0	0	6 (6)	1 (0)
MF	(Hungary)	45	Márió Németh	2	1	0	0	0	0	2 (2)	1 (1)
MF	(Hungary)	46	Ádám Simon	13	0	1	0	3	0	17 (13)	0 (0)
GK	(Hungary)	66	Dániel Rózsa	2	0	0	0	0	0	2 (2)	0 (0)
DF	(Hungary)	69	Szilárd Devecseri	8	0	2	0	0	0	10 (8)	0 (0)
MF	(Hungary)	79	Péter Halmosi	7	2	0	0	3	0	10 (7)	2 (2)
MF	(Hungary)	90	Bence Iszlai	3	2	0	1	4	0	7 (3)	3 (2)
GK	(Hungary)	91	Roland Mursits	0	0	0	0	0	1	0 (0)	1 (0)
			TOTALS	89	10	6	3	20	1	115 (89)	14 (10)

=== Overall ===
Games played	41 (30 OTP Bank Liga, 3 Hungarian Cup and 8 Hungarian League Cup)
Games won	17 (12 OTP Bank Liga, 2 Hungarian Cup and 3 Hungarian League Cup)
Games drawn	13 (10 OTP Bank Liga, 0 Hungarian Cup and 3 Hungarian League Cup)
Games lost	11 (8 OTP Bank Liga, 1 Hungarian Cup and 2 Hungarian League Cup)
Goals scored	55
Goals conceded	44
Goal difference	+11
Yellow cards	115
Red cards	14
Worst discipline	(Hungary) Ádám Simon (17 (yellow card) , 0 (red card) )
Best result	7–2 (H) v Ajka – Ligakupa – 15-10-2013
Worst result	0–2 (A) v Videoton – OTP Bank Liga – 28-07-2013
Worst result	0–2 (A) v Pápa – Ligakupa – 11-09-2013
Worst result	1–3 (H) v Pécs – OTP Bank Liga – 23-11-2013
Worst result	0–2 (H) v Nyíregyháza – Magyar Kupa – 04-12-2013
Worst result	0–2 (A) v Ferencváros – Ligakupa – 04-03-2014
Worst result	0–2 (A) v Debrecen – OTP Bank Liga – 09-03-2014
Worst result	0–2 (A) v Kaposvár – OTP Bank Liga – 19-04-2014
Most appearances	(Hungary) Gábor Nagy (35 appearances)
Most appearances	(Hungary) Ádám Simon (35 appearances)
Most appearances	(Hungary) Bence Iszlai (35 appearances)
Top scorer	(Hungary) András Radó (14 goals)
Points	64/123 (52.03%)

Last updated: 1 June 2014

== Nemzeti Bajnokság I ==
=== Matches ===
28 July 2013 1	Videoton	2–0	Haladás	Székesfehérvár, Fejér County
16:30 CEST	Kleinheisler 25'; Nikolić 46'	(Report)		Stadium: Sóstói Stadion; Attendance: 4,047; Referee: (Hungary) Sándor Andó-Szabó

3 August 2013 2	Haladás	2–2	Győri ETO	Szombathely, Vas County
19:00 CET	Radó 9' (pen.) 58'	(Report)	Martínez 33'; Kink 54' (pen.)	Stadium: Rohonci Street Stadium; Attendance: 2,490; Referee: (Hungary) Péter Solymosi

9 August 2013 3	MTK	0–1	Haladás	Budapest, Pest County
19:00 CEST		(Report)	Ugrai 42'	Stadium: Hidegkuti Nándor Stadium; Attendance: 800; Referee: (Hungary) Viktor Kassai

18 August 2013 4	Haladás	1–1	Debrecen	Szombathely, Vas County
20:30 CEST	Németh 90+4'	(Report)	Szakály 55' (pen.)	Stadium: Rohonci úti Stadion; Attendance: 3,210; Referee: (Hungary) Mihály Fábián

23 August 2013 5	Kecskemét	1–1	Haladás	Kecskemét, Bács-Kiskun County
19:00 CEST	Forró 26'	(Report)	Fehér 49'	Stadium: Széktói Stadion; Attendance: 2,048; Referee: (Hungary) Zsolt Szabó

30 August 2013 6	Haladás	3–2	Lombard Pápa	Szombathely, Vas County
19:00 CEST	Radó 13', 47' (pen.); Halmosi 36'	(Report)	Griffiths 21'; Arsić 89'	Stadium: Rohonci úti Stadion; Attendance: 3,510; Referee: (Hungary) Ádám Farkas

14 September 2013 7	Újpest	1–1	Haladás	Budapest, Pest County
14:00 CEST	Vasiljević 59'	(Report)	Fehér 82'	Stadium: Szusza Ferenc Stadium; Attendance: 2,117; Referee: (Hungary) József Erdős

21 September 2013 8	Haladás	2–1	Puskás Akadémia	Szombathely, Vas County
16:00 CET	Halmosi 10'; Radó 71' (pen.)	(Report)	Lencse 56'	Stadium: Rohonci Street Stadium; Attendance: 2,840; Referee: (Hungary) Sándor Andó-Szabó

28 September 2013 9	Budapest Honvéd	2–1	Haladás	Budapest, Pest County
18:00 CEST	Daud 44' (pen.), 56' (pen.)	(Report)	Radó 71'	Stadium: Bozsik Stadion; Attendance: 1,021; Referee: (Hungary) Péter Solymosi

5 October 2013 10	Haladás	4–1	Kaposvár	Szombathely, Vas County
20:00 CEST	Halmosi 5'; Radó 50' 80' (pen.); Fehér 82'	(Report)	Lucas 39'	Stadium: Rohonci Street Stadium; Attendance: 1,780; Referee: (Hungary) Ádám Németh

18 October 2013 11	Mezőkövesd	0–2	Haladás	Mezőkövesd, Borsod-Abaúj-Zemplén County
19:00 CEST		(Report)	Fótyik 7' (o.g.); Radó 64'	Stadium: Városi Stadion; Attendance: 1,800; Referee: (Hungary) Zsolt Szabó

26 October 2013 12	Haladás	2–2	Diósgyőr	Szombathely, Vas County
20:00 CEST	Nagy G. 24'; Németh M. 61'	(Report)	Abdouraman 11', 89'	Stadium: Rohonci úti Stadion; Attendance: 3,525; Referee: (Hungary) Ádám Farkas

2 November 2013 13	Paks	0–1	Haladás	Paks, Tolna County
20:00 CET		(Report)	Halmosi 77'	Stadium: Stadion PSE; Attendance: 500; Referee: (Hungary) Viktor Kassai

10 November 2013 14	Ferencváros	0–3	Haladás	Budapest, Pest County
16:30 CET		(Report)	Halmosi 10' 65'; Ugrai 22'	Stadium: Ferenc Puskás Stadium; Attendance: 6,758; Referee: (Hungary) Mihály Fábián

23 November 2013 15	Haladás	1–3	Pécs	Szombathely, Vas County
16:00 CET	Fehér 7'	(Report)	Romić 40'; Szatmári 69'; Koller 86'	Stadium: Rohonci Street Stadium; Attendance: 1,850; Referee: (Hungary) József Erdős

1 December 2013 16	Haladás	1–1	Videoton	Szombathely, Vas County
18:30 CEST	Ugrai 61'	(Report)	Nikolić 40' (pen.)	Stadium: Stadion Rohonci Út; Attendance: 2,200; Referee: (Hungary) Viktor Kassai

8 December 2013 17	Győri ETO	2–1	Haladás	Győr, Győr-Moson-Sopron County
18:30 CET	Martínez 69'; Andrić 74'	(Report)	Radó 36' (pen.)	Stadium: ETO Park; Attendance: 1,700; Referee: (Hungary) Zoltán Iványi

1 March 2014 18	Haladás	0–0	MTK	Szombathely, Vas County
16:00 CET		(Report)		Stadium: Rohonci Street Stadium; Attendance: 2,480; Referee: (Hungary) Ádám Farkas

9 March 2014 19	Debrecen	2–0	Haladás	Debrecen, Hajdú-Bihar County
16:30 CET	Máté 60'; Bódi 83'	(Report)		Stadium: Stadion Oláh Gábor Út; Attendance: 6,000; Referee: (Hungary) József Erdős

14 March 2014 20	Haladás	1–0	Kecskemét	Szombathely, Vas County
17:00 CET	Gyurján 55'	(Report)		Stadium: Rohonci Street Stadium; Attendance: 2,320; Referee: (Hungary) Dániel Becséri

21 March 2014 21	Lombard Pápa	1–1	Haladás	Pápa, Veszprém County
19:00 CET	Marić 86'	(Report)	Radó 26'	Stadium: Stadion Várkerti; Attendance: 2,500; Referee: (Hungary) Ádám Németh

30 March 2014 22	Haladás	1–0	Újpest	Szombathely, Vas County
18:30 CEST	Radó 45'	(Report)		Stadium: Rohonci Street Stadium; Attendance: 3,723; Referee: (Hungary) Sándor Andó-Szabó

4 April 2014 23	Puskás Akadémia	1–2	Haladás	Székesfehérvár, Fejér County
17:00 CEST	Czvitkovics 42'	(Report)	Guzmics 33'; Radó 43'	Stadium: Sóstói Stadion; Attendance: 200; Referee: (Hungary) István Vad

13 April 2014 24	Haladás	2–0	Budapest Honvéd	Szombathely, Vas County
16:30 CEST	Hrepka 24' 54'	(Report)		Stadium: Rohonci Street Stadium; Attendance: 3,020; Referee: (Hungary) Sándor Andó-Szabó

19 April 2014 25	Kaposvár	2–0	Haladás	Kaposvár, Somogy County
20:00 CEST	Kink 21' 71' (pen.)	(Report)		Stadium: Stadion Kaposvár Rákóczi; Attendance: 1,200; Referee: (Hungary) Péter Solymosi

26 April 2014 26	Haladás	1–0	Mezőkövesd	Szombathely, Vas County
16:00 CEST	Radó 79'	(Report)		Stadium: Rohonci Street Stadium; Attendance: 2,420; Referee: (Hungary) Dániel Becséri

4 May 2014 27	Diósgyőr	1–1	Haladás	Miskolc, Borsod-Abaúj-Zemplén County
16:30 CEST	Kostić 17'	(Report)	Dvorschák 32'	Stadium: DVTK Stadion; Attendance: 2,869; Referee: (Hungary) József Erdős

11 May 2014 28	Haladás	0–1	Paks	Szombathely, Vas County
18:30 CET		(Report)	Simon A. 23' (pen.)	Stadium: Rohonci Street Stadium; Attendance: 1,122; Referee: (Hungary) Zsolt Szabó

18 May 2014 29	Haladás	0–1	Ferencváros	Szombathely, Vas County
16:30 CET		(Report)	Diallo 55'	Stadium: Rohonci Street Stadium; Attendance: 6,126; Referee: (Hungary) Sándor Andó-Szabó

30 May 2014 30	Pécs	1–1	Haladás	Pécs, Baranya County
19:00 CEST	Pölöskey 6'	(Report)	Dvorschák 14'	Stadium: Stadion PMFC; Attendance: 1,000; Referee: (Hungary) Dániel Becséri

=== Classification ===
Pos	Team	Pld	W	D	L	GF	GA	GD	Pts	Qualification or relegation
4	Videoton	30	15	8	7	52	31	+21	53	
5	Diósgyőr	30	12	11	7	45	38	+7	47	Qualification for Europa League first qualifying round (Note: Diósgyőr qualified for the Europa League first qualifying round as the 2013–14 Magyar Kupa runners-up since the winners, Újpest, failed to receive the UEFA license to participate in European competitions.)
6	Haladás	30	12	10	8	37	31	+6	46	
7	Pécs	30	12	9	9	41	38	+3	45	
8	MTK	30	11	7	12	42	36	+6	40	

Source: mlsz.hu (in Hungarian)
Rules for classification: 1st points; 2nd overall wins; 3rd goal difference; 4th head-to-head points; 5th head-to-head goal difference; 6th head-to-head away goals scored; 7th fair-play points; 8th drawing of lots

=== Results summary ===
Overall								Home						Away					
Pld	W	D	L	GF	GA	GD	Pts	W	D	L	GF	GA	GD	W	D	L	GF	GA	GD
30	12	10	8	37	31	+6	46	7	5	3	21	15	+6	5	5	5	16	16	0

Last updated: 1 June 2014.
Source: NB1

=== Results by round ===
Round	1	2	3	4	5	6	7	8	9	10	11	12	13	14	15	16	17	18	19	20	21	22	23	24	25	26	27	28	29	30
Ground	A	H	A	H	A	H	A	H	A	H	A	H	A	A	H	H	A	H	A	H	A	H	A	H	A	H	A	H	H	A
Result	L	D	W	D	D	W	D	W	L	W	W	D	W	W	L	D	L	D	L	W	D	W	W	W	L	W	D	L	L	D
Position	14	12	9	8	8	6	9	8	8	6	6	7	5	3	4	4	6	6	8	6	7	4	4	3	6	5	5	5	6	6

Updated to match(es) played on 1 June 2014. Source: Matches
A = Away; H = Home; W = Win; D = Draw; L = Loss

== Hungarian Cup ==
30 October 2013 Round of 32	Csákvári TK	0–3	Haladás	Csákvár, Fejér County
12:30 CEST		(Report)	Ugrai 22' 27'; Andorka 51'	Stadium: Tersztyánszky Ödön Sportközpont; Attendance: 200; Referee: (Hungary) Ádám Radványi

27 November 2013 Round of 16 (1st leg)	Nyíregyháza	0–1	Haladás	Nyíregyháza, Szabolcs-Szatmár-Bereg County
17:00 CET		(Report)	Halmosi 11'	Stadium: Városi Stadion; Attendance: 800; Referee: (Hungary) Péter Solymosi

4 December 2013 Round of 16 (2nd leg)	Haladás	0–2 (1–2 agg.)	Nyíregyháza	Szombathely, Vas County
17:30 CET		(Report)	Kákonyi 27'; Törtei 75'	Stadium: Rohonci Street Stadium; Attendance: 1,000; Referee: (Hungary) Dániel Becséri

== League Cup ==
=== Group stage ===
4 September 2013 1	Haladás	2–2	Gyirmót	Szombathely, Vas County
17:00 CEST	Andorka 11' (pen.) 43'	(Report)	Beliczky 80' 83'	Stadium: Rohonci úti Stadion; Attendance: 300; Referee: (Hungary) Zoltán J. Kovács

11 September 2013 2	Lombard Pápa	2–0	Haladás	Pápa, Veszprém County
17:00 CEST	Eszlátyi 34'; Sekour 88'	(Report)		Stadium: Stadion Várkerti; Attendance: 300; Referee: (Hungary) Béla Botló

9 October 2013 3	Ajka	1–2	Haladás	Ajka, Veszprém County
15:00 CEST	Lattenstein 79'	(Report)	Pákai 31' (o.g.); Gyurján 84'	Stadium: Stadium Sport Street; Attendance: 150; Referee: (Hungary) Zoltán J. Kovács

15 October 2013 4	Haladás	7–2	Ajka	Szombathely, Vas County
16:00 CEST	Andorka 13' 31' 37' 78' 82'; Németh 83'; Gyurján 87'	(Report)	Kanta 52'; Dancsecs 60'	Stadium: Rohonci úti Stadion; Attendance: 150; Referee: (Hungary) Gábor Barna

13 November 2013 5	Haladás	0–0	Lombard Pápa	Szombathely, Vas County
13:30 CET		(Report)		Stadium: Illés Akadémia; Attendance: 50; Referee: (Hungary) Gergely Szőts

19 November 2012 6	Gyirmót	2–3	Haladás	Győr, Győr-Moson-Sopron County
15:00 CET	Tóth 14'; Kardos 33'	(Report)	Halmosi 28' 51'; Tóth 45'	Stadium: Ménfői úti sporttelep Attendance: 200; Referee: (Hungary) Béla Botló

==== Classification ====
Pos	Team	Pld	W	D	L	GF	GA	GD	Pts	Qualification
1	Pápa	6	3	3	0	9	5	+4	12	Advance to knockout phase
2	Szombathely	6	3	2	1	14	9	+5	11	Advance to knockout phase
3	Gyirmót	6	2	2	2	13	11	+2	8	
4	Ajka	6	0	1	5	7	18	−11	1	

Rules for classification: 1) points; 2) goal difference; 3) number of goals scored.

==== Knockout phase ====
22 February 2014 Round of 16 (1st leg)	Haladás	0–0	Ferencváros	Szombathely, Vas County
14:00 CET		(Report)		Stadium: Rohonci Street Stadium; Attendance: 1,700; Referee: (Hungary) Gábor Oláh

4 March 2014 Round of 16 (2nd leg)	Ferencváros	2–0 (2–0 agg.)	Haladás	Budapest, Pest County
18:00 CET	Jenner 76' 90'	(Report)		Stadium: Ferenc Puskás Stadium; Attendance: 600; Referee: (Hungary) Zoltán Iványi

== Pre Season (Summer) ==
28 June 2013	SC Wiener Neustadt (Austria)	2–0	Szombathelyi Haladás	Sonnhofen, Hartberg District
18:45 CET (UTC+01)	Maderner 71'; Fröschl 87'	(Report)		Attendance: 150; Referee: (Austria) Kramer

2 July 2013	RNK Split (Croatia)	2–1	Szombathelyi Haladás	Stinatz, Güssing District
17:00 CET (UTC+01)	Vojnović 30'; A. Majstorović 54'	(Report)	Gyurján 5'	Attendance: 50; Referee: (Austria) Pethő

5 July 2013	SV Mattersburg (Austria)	0–1	Szombathelyi Haladás	Oberdorf, Oberwart District
18:00 CET (UTC+01)		(Report)	Radó 10'	Attendance: 200; Referee: (Austria) Paukovits

9 July 2013	Szombathelyi Haladás	6–1	Admira Wacker Amateure (Austria)	Szombathely, Vas County
18:00 CET (UTC+01)	Radó 2' 15'; Guzmics 32'; Andorka 68' 90'; Németh M. 77'	(Report)	Pranjic 8'	Stadium: Rohonci Street Stadium; Attendance: 100; Referee: (Hungary) Szabolcs Szilasi

12 July 2013 Király kupa	Szombathelyi Haladás	3–1	FK Slavija (Bosnia and Herzegovina)	Szombathely, Vas County
14:00 CET (UTC+01)	Németh M. 20'; Radó 23' (pen.); Andorka 36'	(Report)	Dudić 45' (pen.)	Stadium: Király Sportlétesítmény; Attendance: 400; Referee: (Hungary) Tamás Bognár

12 July 2013 Király kupa	Szombathelyi Haladás	2–1	DVTK	Szombathely, Vas County
19:00 CET (UTC+01)	Andorka 18'; Ugrai 38'	(Report)	Gohér 54'	Stadium: Király Sportlétesítmény; Attendance: 500; Referee: (Hungary) Tamás Bognár

17 July 2013	Szombathelyi Haladás	1–1	FC Ajka	Szombathely, Vas County
18:00 CET (UTC+01)	Ugrai 59'	(Report)	Hanzl 80'	Stadium: Rohonci Street Stadium; Attendance: 200; Referee: (Hungary) Pintér

20 July 2013	Szombathelyi Haladás	1–1	ZTE	Szombathely, Vas County
11:00 CET (UTC+01)	Gyurján 17'	(Report)	Frizoni 5'	Stadium: Rohonci Street Stadium; Attendance: 500; Referee: (Hungary) Kovács G.

31 July 2013	Szombathelyi Haladás	2–3	FC Ajka	Szombathely, Vas County
18:00 CET (UTC+01)	N. Bastajic 38'; Radó 54' (pen.)	(Report)	Horváth A. 15'; Major N. 48'; Varga T. 75'	Stadium: Rohonci Street Stadium; Attendance: 300; Referee: (Hungary) Melinda Szvorda

6 August 2013	Szombathelyi Haladás	2–1	Sampdoria (Italy)	Szombathely, Vas County
19:00 CET (UTC+01)	Andorka 84'; Ugrai 87'	(Report)	Wszolek 36'	Stadium: Rohonci Street Stadium; Attendance: 1,300; Referee: (Hungary) Szabolcs Szilasi

== Pre Season (Winter) ==
15 January 2014	Sturm Graz (Austria)	4–2	Szombathelyi Haladás	Graz, Austria
17:00 CET (UTC+01)	Beichler 30'; Vujadinović 35'; Madl 42'; Kanz 49'	(Report)	Gyurján 32'; Ugrai 39'	Stadium: Trainingszentrum Messendorf; Attendance: 400; Referee: (Austria)

21 January 2014	NK Maribor (Slovenia)	5–0	Szombathelyi Haladás	Lendava, Slovenia
14:00 CET (UTC+01)	Mezga 14'; Arghus 55'; Zahovič 66' 77'; Tavares 67'	(Report)		Attendance: 50; Referee: (Slovenia) Grolet

27 January 2014	Szombathelyi Haladás	0–2	Shandong Luneng (China)	Belek, Turkey
14:30 CET (UTC+01)		(Report)	Li Songyi 6' 39' (pen.)	Referee: (Russia) Sokolov

31 January 2014	Szombathelyi Haladás	0–1	Viitorul Constanta (Romania)	Antalya, Turkey
16:30 CET (UTC+01)		(Report)	Dică 23'	Stadium: WOW Sport Center

2 February 2014	Szombathelyi Haladás	2–3	Slavia Praha (Czech Republic)	Antalya, Turkey
14:00 CET (UTC+01)	Radó 44' (pen.) 60'	(Report)	Necid 25'; Juhar 26'; Prošek 86'	Stadium: WOW Sport Center; Attendance: 50

4 February 2014	Szombathelyi Haladás	1–1	1. FC Slovácko (Czech Republic)	Belek, Turkey
14:15 CET (UTC+01)	Radó 31'	(Report)	Došek 55'	Attendance: 50; Referee: (Austria) Seiter

14 February 2014	FC Ajka	1–2	Szombathelyi Haladás	Ajka, Veszprém County
15:00 CET (UTC+01)	Hanzl 91'	(Report)	Halmosi 44'; Guzmics 75'	Attendance: 50; Referee: (Hungary) Lovasi

== Spring ==
28 May 2014	Kemenesalja FC	0–5	Szombathelyi Haladás	Vönöck, Vas County
17:00 CET (UTC+01)		(Report)	Hoós P. 1' 46'; Hrepka 4' 25'; Gyurján 9'	Attendance: 500; Referee: (Hungary) Pintér
