= 2012–13 Szombathelyi Haladás season =

Szombathelyi Haladás
2012–13 season
- Chairman: (Hungary) Béla Illés
- Manager: (Hungary) Tamás Artner
- NB 1: 8.
- Hungarian Cup: 3. round
- Hungarian League Cup: Group Stage
- Top goalscorer: League: András Radó (7); All: Péter Andorka (13)
- Highest home attendance: 5,205 v Ferencváros (6 April 2013)
- Lowest home attendance: 100 v Győr (13 November 2012)
Home colours	Away colours

The 2012–13 season will be Szombathelyi Haladás's 57th competitive season, 5th consecutive season in the OTP Bank Liga and 93rd year in existence as a football club.

== First team squad ==
Note: Flags indicate national team as defined under FIFA eligibility rules; some limited exceptions apply. Players may hold more than one non-FIFA nationality.

No.	Pos.	Nation	Player
2	MF	HUN	Zoltán Búrány
3	DF	HUN	Zoltán Fehér
4	MF	HUN	Gábor Rajos
6	MF	HUN	Attila Szakály
8	MF	HUN	Gábor Nagy
9	FW	HUN	Péter Andorka
10	MF	HUN	Kornél Kulcsár
12	DF	HUN	Szilárd Devecseri
13	MF	HUN	Péter Halmosi
14	FW	HUN	Roland Ugrai
15	MF	HUN	Péter Tóth
16	MF	HUN	Márió Németh
18	MF	HUN	Bence Gyurján

No.	Pos.	Nation	Player
20	FW	HUN	Krisztián Kenesei
22	DF	HUN	Richárd Guzmics
23	DF	HUN	Szabolcs Schimmer
26	DF	HUN	Márk Jagodics
30	GK	HUN	Gergő Gőcze
32	MF	HUN	András Radó
33	DF	HUN	Márk Farkas
37	MF	HUN	Milán Kalász
46	MF	HUN	Ádám Simon (loan from Palermo)
66	GK	HUN	Dániel Rózsa
90	MF	HUN	Bence Iszlai
91	GK	HUN	Roland Mursits

== Transfers ==
=== Summer ===
In: Note: Flags indicate national team as defined under FIFA eligibility rules; some limited exceptions apply. Players may hold more than one non-FIFA nationality.

No.	Pos.	Nation	Player
3	DF	HUN	Zoltán Fehér (from Győr)
9	FW	HUN	Péter Andorka (from Pécs)
11	MF	HUN	Ignác Irhás (loan return from Mezőkövesd)
17	FW	HUN	Attila Simon (loan return from Sopron)
46	MF	HUN	Ádám Simon (loan from (Italy) Palermo)

Out: Note: Flags indicate national team as defined under FIFA eligibility rules; some limited exceptions apply. Players may hold more than one non-FIFA nationality.

No.	Pos.	Nation	Player
7	MF	HUN	András Horváth (to Sopron)
9	FW	HUN	Márton Oross (to Gyirmót)
11	MF	HUN	Ignác Irhás (to Mezőkövesd)
16	FW	HUN	Máté Skriba (loan to Tatabánya)
17	FW	HUN	Attila Simon (to Nyíregyháza)
18	MF	HUN	Norbert Sipos (to Siófok)
24	FW	MNE	Goran Vujović (loan return to Videoton)
29	MF	SVK	Marián Sluka (to Siófok)

=== Winter ===
In: Note: Flags indicate national team as defined under FIFA eligibility rules; some limited exceptions apply. Players may hold more than one non-FIFA nationality.

No.	Pos.	Nation	Player
—	FW	HUN	András Simon (loan from Győr)

Out: Note: Flags indicate national team as defined under FIFA eligibility rules; some limited exceptions apply. Players may hold more than one non-FIFA nationality.

No.	Pos.	Nation	Player
5	DF	HUN	Gábor Korolovszky (to Nyíregyháza)
21	MF	HUN	Dániel Nagy (loan return to Videoton)

- List of Hungarian football transfers summer 2012
- List of Hungarian football transfers winter 2012–13

== Statistics ==
=== Appearances and goals ===
Last updated on 2 June 2013.

No.	Pos	Nat	Player	Total		OTP Bank Liga		Hungarian Cup		League Cup	
No.	Pos	Nat	Player	Apps	Goals	Apps	Goals	Apps	Goals	Apps	Goals
2	MF	(Hungary) HUN	Zoltán Búrány	22	0	17	0	2	0	3	0
3	DF	(Hungary) HUN	Zoltán Fehér	26	0	22	0	2	0	2	0
4	MF	(Hungary) HUN	Gábor Rajos	22	0	16	0	2	0	4	0
6	MF	(Hungary) HUN	Attila Szakály	10	0	7	0	1	0	2	0
8	MF	(Hungary) HUN	Gábor Nagy	32	0	27	0	2	0	3	0
9	FW	(Hungary) HUN	Péter Andorka	30	13	25	6	1	1	4	6
10	MF	(Hungary) HUN	Kornél Kulcsár	8	0	6	0	1	0	1	0
12	DF	(Hungary) HUN	Szilárd Devecseri	24	0	18	0	2	0	4	0
13	MF	(Hungary) HUN	Péter Halmosi	25	6	23	5	2	1	0	0
14	FW	(Hungary) HUN	Roland Ugrai	24	3	21	3	2	0	1	0
15	DF	(Hungary) HUN	Péter Tóth	14	0	14	0	0	0	0	0
16	MF	(Hungary) HUN	Márió Németh	9	0	6	0	0	0	3	0
18	MF	(Hungary) HUN	Bence Gyurján	11	0	10	0	0	0	1	0
20	FW	(Hungary) HUN	Krisztián Kenesei	14	6	13	6	1	0	0	0
22	DF	(Hungary) HUN	Richárd Guzmics	29	0	28	0	0	0	1	0
23	DF	(Hungary) HUN	Szabolcs Schimmer	29	0	27	0	2	0	0	0
26	DF	(Hungary) HUN	Márk Jagodics	14	0	10	0	1	0	3	0
30	GK	(Hungary) HUN	Gergő Gőcze	4	-4	2	-1	1	0	1	-3
32	MF	(Hungary) HUN	András Radó	29	8	27	7	1	0	1	1
33	DF	(Hungary) HUN	Márk Farkas	7	0	2	0	0	0	5	0
37	MF	(Hungary) HUN	Milán Kalász	15	2	13	2	0	0	2	0
46	MF	(Hungary) HUN	Ádám Simon	19	1	17	1	1	0	1	0
66	GK	(Hungary) HUN	Dániel Rózsa	29	-30	26	-25	1	-2	2	-3
90	MF	(Hungary) HUN	Bence Iszlai	30	5	27	5	2	0	1	0
91	GK	(Hungary) HUN	Roland Mursits	5	-8	2	-1	0	0	3	-7
Youth players:
11	MF	(Hungary) HUN	Detre Horváth	1	0	0	0	0	0	1	0
17	FW	(Hungary) HUN	Richárd Czafit	4	0	0	0	0	0	4	0
19	MF	(Hungary) HUN	Máté Hanzl	4	0	0	0	0	0	4	0
19	DF	(Hungary) HUN	Martin Zsirai	1	0	0	0	0	0	1	0
	GK	(Hungary) HUN	Dániel Jurak	1	-5	0	0	0	0	1	-5
	DF	(Hungary) HUN	Zsolt Angyal	1	0	0	0	0	0	1	0
	DF	(Hungary) HUN	Bence Jagodics	1	0	0	0	0	0	1	0
	MF	(Hungary) HUN	Dominik Tóth	1	0	0	0	0	0	1	0
	DF	(Hungary) HUN	Tibor Ambrus	1	0	0	0	0	0	1	0
	FW	(Hungary) HUN	Ádám Fider	2	0	0	0	0	0	2	0
	DF	(Hungary) HUN	Patrik Füredi	1	0	0	0	0	0	1	0
	FW	(Hungary) HUN	László Tóth	2	2	0	0	0	0	2	2
	MF	(Hungary) HUN	Alex Sándor	1	0	0	0	0	0	1	0
	FW	(Hungary) HUN	Máté Dallos	2	0	0	0	0	0	2	0
	MF	(Hungary) HUN	Roland Rába	1	0	0	0	0	0	1	0
	FW	(Hungary) HUN	Zoltán Medgyes	2	0	0	0	0	0	2	0
	MF	(Hungary) HUN	Barnabás Rácz	1	0	0	0	0	0	1	0
	DF	(Hungary) HUN	Tamás Szeles	2	0	0	0	0	0	2	0
	DF	(Hungary) HUN	Zoltán Nagy	1	0	0	0	0	0	1	0
	MF	(Hungary) HUN	László Kaiser	1	1	0	0	0	0	1	1
Players no longer at the club:
5	DF	(Hungary) HUN	Gábor Korolovszky	5	0	3	0	0	0	2	0
7	MF	(Hungary) HUN	András Horváth	1	0	1	0	0	0	0	0
21	MF	(Hungary) HUN	Dániel Nagy	13	1	9	1	1	0	3	0

=== Top scorers ===
Includes all competitive matches. The list is sorted by shirt number when total goals are equal.

Last updated on 2 June 2013

Position	Nation	Number	Name	OTP Bank Liga	Hungarian Cup	League Cup	Total
1	(Hungary)	9	Péter Andorka	6	1	6	13
2	(Hungary)	32	András Radó	7	0	1	8
3	(Hungary)	20	Krisztián Kenesei	6	0	0	6
4	(Hungary)	13	Péter Halmosi	5	1	0	6
5	(Hungary)	90	Bence Iszlai	5	0	0	5
6	(Hungary)	14	Roland Ugrai	3	0	0	3
7	(Hungary)	37	Milán Kalász	2	0	0	2
8	(Hungary)	7	László Tóth	0	0	2	2
9	(Hungary)	21	Dániel Nagy	1	0	0	1
10	(Hungary)	46	Ádám Simon	1	0	0	1
11	(Hungary)	10	László Kaiser	0	0	1	1
/	/	/	Own Goals	0	0	1	1
			TOTALS	36	2	11	49

=== Disciplinary record ===
Includes all competitive matches. Players with 1 card or more included only.

Last updated on 2 June 2013

Position	Nation	Number	Name	OTP Bank Liga		Hungarian Cup		League Cup		Total (Hu Total)	
Position	Nation	Number	Name	Booked	Sent off (straight red)	Booked	Sent off (straight red)	Booked	Sent off (straight red)	Booked	Sent off (straight red)
DF	(Hungary)	2	Zoltán Búrány	1	0	1	0	0	0	2 (1)	0 (0)
DF	(Hungary)	3	Zoltán Fehér	4	2	0	0	0	0	4 (4)	2 (2)
MF	(Hungary)	4	Gábor Rajos	5	0	0	0	0	0	5 (5)	0 (0)
DF	(Hungary)	5	Gábor Korolovszky	2	0	0	0	1	0	3 (2)	0 (0)
MF	(Hungary)	8	Gábor Nagy	10	0	0	0	1	0	11 (10)	0 (0)
FW	(Hungary)	9	Péter Andorka	4	0	0	1	1	0	5 (4)	1 (0)
MF	(Hungary)	10	Kornél Kulcsár	2	0	1	0	0	0	3 (2)	0 (0)
DF	(Hungary)	12	Szilárd Devecseri	5	0	1	0	3	0	9 (5)	0 (0)
MF	(Hungary)	13	Péter Halmosi	10	0	0	0	0	0	10 (10)	0 (0)
FW	(Hungary)	14	Roland Ugrai	3	0	1	0	0	0	4 (3)	0 (0)
DF	(Hungary)	15	Péter Tóth	6	0	0	0	0	0	6 (6)	0 (0)
MF	(Hungary)	18	Bence Gyurján	3	0	0	0	0	0	3 (3)	0 (0)
MF	(Hungary)	19	Máté Hanzl	0	0	0	0	1	0	1 (0)	0 (0)
FW	(Hungary)	20	Krisztián Kenesei	1	0	0	0	0	0	1 (1)	0 (0)
DF	(Hungary)	22	Richárd Guzmics	3	1	0	0	0	0	3 (3)	1 (1)
DF	(Hungary)	23	Szabolcs Schimmer	2	0	0	0	0	0	2 (2)	0 (0)
MF	(Hungary)	26	Márk Jagodics	0	0	0	0	2	0	2 (0)	0 (0)
MF	(Hungary)	32	András Radó	4	0	0	0	0	0	4 (4)	0 (0)
DF	(Hungary)	33	Márk Farkas	1	0	0	0	2	0	3 (1)	0 (0)
MF	(Hungary)	37	Milán Kalász	1	0	0	0	0	0	1 (1)	0 (0)
MF	(Hungary)	46	Ádám Simon	7	1	0	0	1	0	8 (7)	1 (1)
GK	(Hungary)	66	Dániel Rózsa	0	0	0	0	0	1	0 (0)	1 (0)
MF	(Hungary)	90	Bence Iszlai	10	1	2	0	0	0	12 (10)	1 (1)
MF	(Hungary)		Barnabás Rácz	0	0	0	0	1	0	1 (0)	0 (0)
			TOTALS	84	5	6	1	13	1	103 (84)	7 (5)

=== Overall ===
Games played	38 (30 OTP Bank Liga, 2 Hungarian Cup and 6 Hungarian League Cup)
Games won	13 (11 OTP Bank Liga, 1 Hungarian Cup and 1 Hungarian League Cup)
Games drawn	13 (11 OTP Bank Liga, 0 Hungarian Cup and 2 Hungarian League Cup)
Games lost	12 (8 OTP Bank Liga, 1 Hungarian Cup and 3 Hungarian League Cup)
Goals scored	49
Goals conceded	47
Goal difference	+2
Yellow cards	103
Red cards	7
Worst discipline	(Hungary) Bence Iszlai (12 (yellow card) , 1 (red card) )
Best result	3–0 (A) v BFC Siófok - OTP Bank Liga - 11–08–2012
Best result	3–0 (H) v MTK Budapest FC - OTP Bank Liga - 21–09–2012
Worst result	1–5 (A) v Győri ETO FC - Ligakupa - 09–09–2012
Most appearances	(Hungary) Gábor Nagy (32 appearances)
Top scorer	(Hungary) Péter Andorka (12 goal)
Points	52/114 (45.61%)

Last updated: 2 June 2013

== Nemzeti Bajnokság I ==
=== Matches ===
27 July 2012 1	Haladás	4–2	Eger	Szombathely, Vas County
17:00 CEST	Kenesei 50'; Halmosi 52'; Iszlai 58' (pen.); Andorka 63' (pen.)	(Report)	Pisanjuk 45'; Németh 74'	Stadium: Rohonci úti Stadion; Attendance: 5,000; Referee: (Hungary) József Berger

4 August 2012 2	Győr	1–1	Haladás	Győr, Győr-Moson-Sopron County
19:00 CEST	Kronaveter 27'	(Report)	Radó 55'	Stadium: ETO Park; Attendance: 2,500; Referee: (Hungary) Péter Solymosi

10 August 2012 3	Siófok	0–3	Haladás	Siófok, Somogy County
19:00 CEST		(Report)	Radó 3'; Iszlai 29' (pen.); Kenesei 76'	Stadium: Révész Street Stadium; Attendance: 1,000; Referee: (Hungary) Balázs Berke

18 August 2012 4	Haladás	0–0	Diósgyőr	Szombathely, Vas County
14:00 CEST		(Report)		Stadium: Rohonci úti Stadion; Attendance: 5,000; Referee: (Hungary) Viktor Kassai

26 August 2012 5	Videoton	2–1	Haladás	Székesfehérvár, Fejér County
18:30 CEST	Gyurcsó 61', 63'	(Report)	Andorka 80'	Stadium: Sóstói Stadion; Attendance: 3,000; Referee: (Hungary) Sándor Andó-Szabó

1 September 2012 6	Haladás	1–2	Paks	Szombathely, Vas County
16:00 CEST	Kenesei 18'	(Report)	Lázok 40'; Kenesei 67' (o.g.)	Stadium: Rohonci úti Stadion; Attendance: 4,500; Referee: (Hungary) Balázs Böcskei

14 September 2012 7	Ferencváros	2–1	Haladás	Budapest, Pest County
19:00 CEST	Somália 10'; Čukić 87'	(Report)	Andorka 90+3'	Stadium: Stadion Albert Flórián; Attendance: 4,500; Referee: (Hungary) Ádám Farkas

21 September 2012 8	Haladás	3–0	MTK Budapest	Szombathely, Vas County
17:00 CEST	Iszlai 24' (pen.); Kenesei 27'; Halmosi 55'	(Report)		Stadium: Rohonci Street Stadium; Attendance: 3,000; Referee: (Hungary) Péter Solymosi

29 September 2012 9	Debrecen	2–0	Haladás	Debrecen, Hajdú-Bihar County
16:00 CEST	Rezes 38'; Kulcsár 80'	(Report)		Stadium: Stadion Oláh Gábor Út; Attendance: 4,000; Referee: (Hungary) Zoltán Iványi

6 October 2012 10	Haladás	0–0	Kaposvár	Szombathely, Vas County
18:30 CEST		(Report)		Stadium: Rohonci Street Stadium; Attendance: 4,500; Referee: (Hungary) Szabolcs Szilasi

20 October 2012 11	Kecskemét	2–1	Haladás	Kecskemét, Bács-Kiskun County
16:00 CEST	Tarabai 84'; Litsingi 90+3'	(Report)	Nagy D. 43'	Stadium: Széktói Stadion; Attendance: 1,000; Referee: (Hungary) József Erdős

27 October 2012 12	Haladás	1–1	Pécs	Szombathely, Vas County
16:00 CEST	Kenesei 84' (pen.)	(Report)	Čaušić 75'	Stadium: Rohonci Street Stadium; Attendance: 4,500; Referee: (Hungary) István Vad

3 November 2012 13	Pápa	1–0	Haladás	Pápa, Veszprém County
16:00 CET	Marić 29' (pen.)	(Report)		Stadium: Stadion Várkerti; Attendance: 3,200; Referee: (Hungary) Roland Veizer

10 November 2012 14	Haladás	2–0	Újpest	Szombathely, Vas County
14:00 CET	Iszlai 70' (pen.); Kenesei 90+3'	(Report)		Stadium: Rohonci Street Stadium; Attendance: 1,800; Referee: (Hungary) Sándor Andó-Szabó

18 November 2012 15	Budapest Honvéd	1–1	Haladás	Budapest, Pest County
18:30 CET	Vécsei 51'	(Report)	Ugrai 66'	Stadium: Bozsik Stadion; Attendance: 1,000; Referee: (Hungary) Dániel Becséri

24 November 2012 16	Eger	1–2	Haladás	Budapest, Pest County
16:00 CEST	Németh 83'	(Report)	Ugrai 53'; Andorka 58'	Stadium: Stadion Rudolf Illovszky; Attendance: 100; Referee: (Hungary) Mihály Fábián

1 December 2012 17	Haladás	1–1	Győr	Szombathely, Vas County
14:00 CET	Kalász 28'	(Report)	Trajković 21'	Stadium: Rohonci Street Stadium; Attendance: 3,500; Referee: (Hungary) Péter Solymosi

2 March 2013 18	Haladás	2–1	Siófok	Szombathely, Vas County
16:00 CET	Iszlai 69' (pen.); Halmosi 77' (pen.)	(Report)	Nagy 38'	Stadium: Stadion Rohonci Út; Attendance: 2,247; Referee: (Hungary) Gábor Oláh

9 March 2013 19	Diósgyőr	1–1	Haladás	Miskolc, Borsod-Abaúj-Zemplén County
14:00 CET	Luque 22'	(Report)	Halmosi 12' (pen.)	Stadium: DVTK Stadion; Attendance: 4,597; Referee: (Hungary) Sándor Andó-Szabó

10 April 2013 20	Haladás	0–1	Videoton	Szombathely, Vas County
16:00 CEST		(Report)	Alvarez 33'	Stadium: Stadion Rohonci Út; Attendance: 1,972; Referee: (Hungary) Péter Solymosi

30 March 2013 21	Paks	0–0	Haladás	Paks, Tolna County
15:00 CET		(Report)		Stadium: Stadion PSE; Attendance: 600; Referee: (Hungary) Viktor Kassai

6 April 2013 22	Haladás	0–0	Ferencváros	Szombathely, Vas County
16:00 CEST		(Report)		Stadium: Stadion Rohonci Út; Attendance: 5,205; Referee: (Hungary) Sándor Andó-Szabó

13 April 2013 23	MTK Budapest	0–1	Haladás	Budapest, Pest County
16:00 CET		(Report)	Radó 5'	Stadium: Hidegkuti Nándor Stadium; Attendance: 700; Referee: (Hungary) Dániel Becséri

21 April 2012 24	Haladás	1–0	Debrecen	Szombathely, Vas County
18:30 CEST	Halmosi 51'	(Report)		Stadium: Rohonci úti Stadion; Attendance: 2,459; Referee: (Hungary) Zoltán Iványi

27 April 2013 25	Kaposvár	3–2	Haladás	Kaposvár, Somogy County
16:00 CET	Hegedűs 34'; Oláh 47', 60' (pen.)	(Report)	Andorka 46'; Ugrai 90'	Stadium: Stadion Kaposvár Rákóczi; Attendance: 2,000; Referee: (Hungary) Ádám Németh

3 May 2013 26	Haladás	1–1	Kecskemét	Szombathely, Vas County
19:00 CEST	Andorka 82'	(Report)	Mogyorósi 85'	Stadium: Rohonci úti Stadion; Attendance: 1,869; Referee: (Hungary) Szabolcs Szilasi

11 May 2013 27	Pécs	0–2	Haladás	Pécs, Baranya County
16:00 CEST		(Report)	Radó 81', 85' (pen.)	Stadium: Stadion PMFC; Attendance: 800; Referee: (Qatar) Hamisz Mohammed al-Marri

17 May 2013 28	Haladás	2–1	Pápa	Szombathely, Vas County
17:00 CEST	Kalász 54'; Radó 88' (pen.)	(Report)	Quintero 21'	Stadium: Rohonci úti Stadion; Attendance: 1,950; Referee: (Hungary) Zoltán Iványi

24 May 2013 29	Újpest	0–1	Haladás	Budapest, Pest County
17:00 CEST		(Report)	Radó 90'	Stadium: Szusza Ferenc Stadium; Attendance: 2,284; Referee: (Hungary) József Erdős

1 June 2012 30	Haladás	1–1	Budapest Honvéd	Szombathely, Vas County
16:00 CEST	Simon 30'	(Report)	Vernes 15'	Stadium: Rohonci úti Stadion; Attendance: 2,600; Referee: (Hungary) Mihály Fábián

=== Classification ===
Pos	Team	Pld	W	D	L	GF	GA	GD	Pts	Qualification or relegation
6	Debrecen	30	14	4	12	47	36	+11	46	Qualification for Europa League second qualifying round (Note: Debrecen qualified for the Europa League second qualifying round as the 2012–13 Magyar Kupa winners.)
7	Kecskemét	30	12	8	10	42	42	0	44	
8	Haladás	30	11	11	8	36	27	+9	44	
9	Újpest	30	11	8	11	40	42	−2	41	
10	Diósgyőr	30	9	11	10	31	39	−8	38	

Source: mlsz.hu (in Hungarian)
Rules for classification: 1st points; 2nd overall wins; 3rd goal difference; 4th head-to-head points; 5th head-to-head goal difference; 6th head-to-head away goals scored; 7th fair-play points; 8th drawing of lots

=== Results summary ===
Overall								Home						Away					
Pld	W	D	L	GF	GA	GD	Pts	W	D	L	GF	GA	GD	W	D	L	GF	GA	GD
30	11	11	8	36	27	+9	44	6	7	2	19	11	+8	5	4	6	17	16	+1

Last updated: 2 June 2013.
Source: NB1

=== Results by round ===
Round	1	2	3	4	5	6	7	8	9	10	11	12	13	14	15	16	17	18	19	20	21	22	23	24	25	26	27	28	29	30
Ground	H	A	A	H	A	H	A	H	A	H	A	H	A	H	A	A	H	H	A	H	A	H	A	H	A	H	A	H	A	H
Result	W	D	W	D	L	L	L	W	L	D	L	D	L	W	D	W	D	W	D	L	D	D	W	W	L	D	W	W	W	D
Position	2	2	2	3	7	7	9	7	9	9	12	12	14	12	12	10	11	9	9	11	11	12	10	8	10	10	8	8	7	8

Updated to match(es) played on 2 June 2013. Source: Matches
A = Away; H = Home; W = Win; D = Draw; L = Loss

== Hungarian Cup ==
26 September 2012 2	Ferencváros	0–2	Haladás	Budapest, Pest County
18:00 CEST		(Report)	Halmosi 47'; Andorka 48'	Stadium: Stadion Albert Flórián; Attendance: 1,000; Referee: (Hungary) Zsolt Szabó

31 October 2012 3	Videoton	2–0 (a.e.t.)	Haladás	Székesfehérvár, Fejér County
18:00 CET	Nikolić 95', 100'	(Report)		Stadium: Sóstói Stadion; Attendance: 1,571; Referee: (Hungary) Péter Solymosi

== League Cup ==
=== Group stage ===
5 September 2012 1	Haladás	3–3	Gyirmót	Szombathely, Vas County
18:00 CEST	Andorka 38' (pen.) 57'; Regedei 83' (o.g.)	(Report)	Nagy L. 76'; Ferenczi 82' 88'	Stadium: Rohonci úti Stadion; Attendance: 400; Referee: (Hungary) József Erdős

9 September 2012 2	Győr	5–1	Haladás	Győr, Győr-Moson-Sopron County
16:30 CEST	Kronaveter 33', 53'; Dudás 59'; Aleksidze 67'; Střeštík 74'	(Report)	Tóth L. 49'	Stadium: ETO Park; Attendance: 600; Referee: (Hungary) István Vad

10 October 2012 3	Haladás	3–3	Budapest Honvéd	Szombathely, Vas County
17:00 CEST	Andorka 2', 6'; Radó 18'	(Report)	Faggyas 31'; Hidi 75'; Abass 84'	Stadium: Rohonci úti Stadion; Attendance: 400; Referee: (Hungary) Zoltán J. Kovács

13 October 2012 4	Budapest Honvéd	2–0	Haladás	Budapest, Pest County
16:00 CEST	Faggyas 33'; Délczeg 87'	(Report)		Stadium: Bozsik Stadion; Attendance: 200; Referee: (Hungary) László Varga

13 November 2012 5	Haladás	2–1	Győr	Szombathely, Vas County
16:00 CET	Andorka 60', 89'	(Report)	Kalmár Zs. 28'	Stadium: Illés Akadémia; Attendance: 100; Referee: (Hungary) Norbert Kiss

28 November 2012 6	Gyirmót	4–2	Haladás	Győr, Győr-Moson-Sopron County
15:00 CET	Cseri T. 28'; Nagy 45'; Varga 53'; Laki B. 67'	(Report)	Tóth L. 65'; Kaiser L. 76'	Stadium: Ménfői úti sporttelep Attendance: 100; Referee: (Hungary) Balázs Berke

==== Classification ====
Pos	Team	Pld	W	D	L	GF	GA	GD	Pts	Qualification
1	Győr	6	3	2	1	18	8	+10	11	Advance to knockout phase
2	Honvéd	6	3	2	1	13	9	+4	11	Advance to knockout phase
3	Gyirmót	6	1	2	3	11	18	−7	5	
4	Haladás	6	1	2	3	11	18	−7	5	

Rules for classification: 1) points; 2) goal difference; 3) number of goals scored.

== Pre Season (Summer) ==
23 June 2012	Zalalövői TK	0–3	Szombathelyi Haladás	Zalalövő, Zala County
16:30 CET (UTC+01)		(Report)	Guzmics 36'; Kalász 48'; Ugrai 60'	Attendance: 300; Referee: (Hungary) Pető

26 June 2012	SK Sturm Graz (Austria)	1–2	Szombathelyi Haladás	Söchau, Fürstenfeld District
18:30 CET (UTC+01)	Szabics 53'	(Report)	Kulcsár 49' 72'	Attendance: 800

28 June 2012	FC Metalurh Donetsk (Ukraine)	1–1	Szombathelyi Haladás	Bad Tatzmannsdorf, Oberwart District
17:00 CET (UTC+01)	Ivanko 80'	(Report)	Radó 8'	Attendance: 100; Referee: (Austria) König

30 June 2012	Szombathelyi Haladás	2–0	FC Ceahlăul Piatra Neamț (Romania)	Szombathely, Vas County
11:30 CET (UTC+01)	Iszlai 45' (pen.); Ugrai 62'	(Report)		Stadium: Rohonci Street Stadium; Attendance: 200; Referee: (Hungary) Szilasi

3 July 2012	FC Chornomorets Odesa (Ukraine)	0–3	Szombathelyi Haladás	Wien
14:00 CET (UTC+01)		(Report)	Andorka 48' (pen.) 60'; Nagy D. 85'	Stadium: Wienerberger Arena; Attendance: 100; Referee: (Austria) Kaiser

6 July 2012 Király kupa	Szombathelyi Haladás	0–1	Kaposvári Rákóczi FC	Szombathely, Vas County
14:00 CET (UTC+01)		(Report)	Farkas P. 58'	Stadium: Király Sportlétesítmény; Attendance: 300; Referee: (Hungary) Gaál

6 July 2012 Király kupa	Szombathelyi Haladás	0–0 (2–1 p)	FC Mordovia Saransk (Russia)	Szombathely, Vas County
17:00 CET (UTC+01)		(Report)		Stadium: Király Sportlétesítmény; Attendance: 300; Referee: (Hungary) Király K.
	Penalties
	Horváth A. (penalty scored); Farkas M. (penalty missed); Andorka (penalty missed); Ugrai (penalty missed); Jagodics M. (penalty scored)		(penalty scored) Budnikov; (penalty missed) Ponomaryov; (penalty missed) Rustem Mukhametshin; (penalty missed) Zhestkov; (penalty missed) Ruslan Mukhametshin

11 July 2012	Szombathelyi Haladás	2–2	ACF Gloria 1922 Bistrița (Romania)	Gerersdorf bei Güssing, Güssing District
17:30 CET (UTC+01)	Kenesei 20'; Nagy D. 50'		Layo dos Santos 43'; Stan 85'	Attendance: 100; Referee: (Hungary) Pethő

14 July 2012	FC Rostov (Russia)	2–1	Szombathelyi Haladás	Unterschützen, Oberwart District
17:00 CET (UTC+01)	Dyakov 39'; Adamov 48'	(Report)	Andorka 26'	Attendance: 50; Referee: (Austria) Windisch

18 July 2012	Szombathelyi Haladás	6–1	Veszprém FC	Szombathely, Vas County
19:00 CET (UTC+01)	Kenesei 6' 30'; Radó 57' (pen.) 76' 86'; Ugrai 82'	(Report)	Makrai 15'	Stadium: Rohonci Street Stadium; Attendance: 300; Referee: (Hungary) Tóth R.

22 July 2012	Szombathelyi Haladás	0–1	TSV 1860 München (Germany)	Szombathely, Vas County
17:00 CET (UTC+01)		(Report)	Lauth 34'	Stadium: Rohonci Street Stadium; Attendance: 3000; Referee: (Hungary) Bognár T.

1 August 2012	Szombathelyi Haladás	1–2	1. FSV Mainz 05 (Germany)	Szombathely, Vas County
19:00 CET (UTC+01)	Iszlai 30' (pen.)	(Report)	Kirchhoff 56'; Ivanschitz 68'	Stadium: Rohonci Street Stadium; Attendance: 1000; Referee: (Hungary) Becséri

== Pre Season (Winter) ==
23 January 2013	Szombathelyi Haladás	5–1	FC Ajka	Szombathely, Vas County
15:00 CET (UTC+01)	Andorka 34' (pen.) 44' (pen.); Radó 37' (pen.); Kenesei 47' (pen.); Czafit 62'	(Report)	Sowunmi 78'	Attendance: 50; Referee: (Hungary) Takács R.

25 January 2013	FC Admira Wacker (Austria)	2–0	Szombathelyi Haladás	Wien
14:00 CET (UTC+01)	Toth 32'; Auer 90'	(Report)		Attendance: 150; Referee: (Austria) Nastl

26 January 2013	Szombathelyi Haladás	4–1	Zalaegerszegi TE	Szombathely, Vas County
11:00 CET (UTC+01)	Andorka 30'; Iszlai 50' (pen.); Kulcsár 62'; Gyurján 73'		Sluka 3'	Attendance: 100; Referee: (Hungary) Papp

30 January 2013	FC Ajka	2–4	Szombathelyi Haladás	Ajka, Veszprém County
16:00 CET (UTC+01)	Kovács Zs. 60'; Major N. 65'	(Report)	Andorka 25'; Schimmer 40'; Radó 72' 85'	Attendance: 300; Referee: (Hungary) Szabó

2 February 2013	Szombathelyi Haladás	2–0	Veszprém FC	Szombathely, Vas County
11:00 CET (UTC+01)	Devecseri 29'; Kenesei 72' (pen.)	(Report)		Attendance: 100; Referee: (Hungary) Király K.

6 February 2013	Soproni VSE	3–2	Szombathelyi Haladás	Sopron, Győr-Moson-Sopron County
11:00 CET (UTC+01)	Varga G. 57' 75'; Gaál B. 65' (pen.)	(Report)	Halmosi 28'; Andorka 45'	Attendance: 50; Referee: (Hungary) Ábrahám

9 February 2013	SV Mattersburg (Austria)	1–1	Szombathelyi Haladás	Mattersburg, Mattersburg District
15:00 CET (UTC+01)	Klemen 72'	(Report)	Andorka 29'	Attendance: 250; Referee: (Austria) Flasch

15 February 2013	Szombathelyi Haladás	0–2	Gyirmót SE	Szombathely, Vas County
15:00 CET (UTC+01)		(Report)	Magasföldi 35' 57'	Stadium: 100; Referee: (Hungary) ifj. Tuczai

20 February 2013	Szombathelyi Haladás	2–1	Szigetszentmiklósi TK	Szombathely, Vas County
13:00 CET (UTC+01)	Halmosi 25'; Iszlai 58'		G. Khous 75' (pen.)	Attendance: 100; Referee: (Hungary) Vass

== Spring ==
20 March 2013	Szombathelyi Haladás	1–2	Azerbaijan U21	Szombathely, Vas County
16:00 CET (UTC+01)	Búrány 44'		Abdullayev 8'; Yunuszadə 41'	Attendance: 50; Referee: (Hungary) Pintér
