= András Radó =

Hungarian footballer (born 1993)

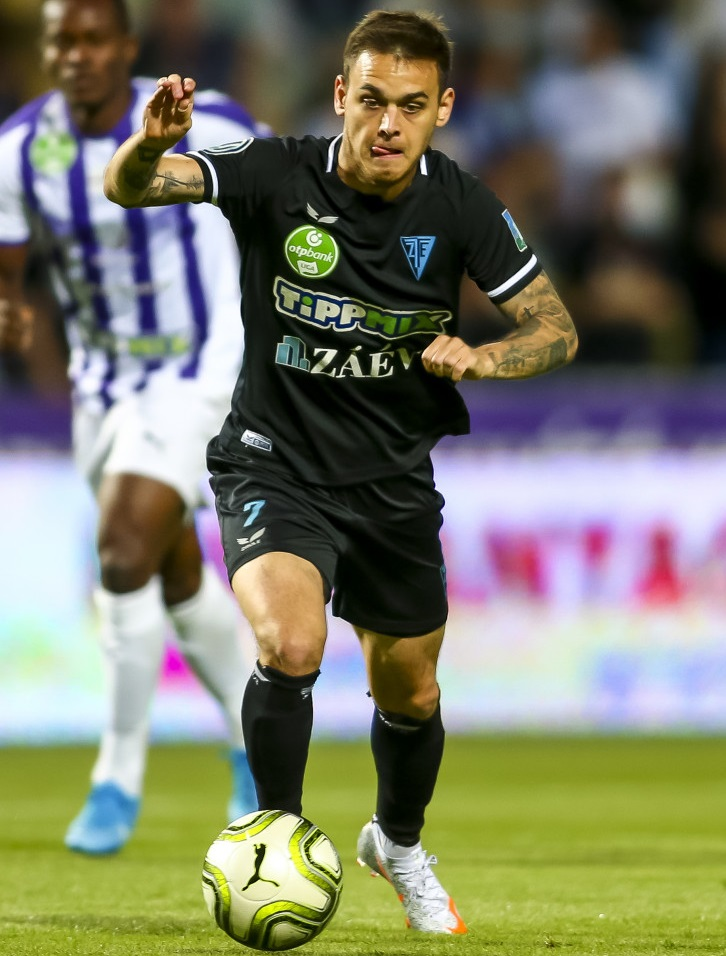
- Radó playing for Zalaegerszeg in 2020

Personal information
- Date of birth: 9 September 1993 (age 33)
- Place of birth: Pápa, Hungary
- Height: 1.69 m (5 ft 7 in)
- Position: Attacking midfielder

Team information
- Current team: Vasas
- Number: 7

Youth career
- 2003–2008: Pápa
- 2008–2012: Haladás

Senior career*
| Years | Team | Apps | (Gls) |
| 2009–2011 | Haladás II | 42 | (16) |
| 2010–2015 | Haladás | 91 | (29) |
| 2015–2017 | Ferencváros | 38 | (6) |
| 2017–2019 | Puskás Akadémia | 42 | (7) |
| 2019–2020 | Zalaegerszeg | 33 | (13) |
| 2020– | Vasas | 171 | (46) |
| 2023 | Vasas II | 6 | (2) |

International career
| 2012–2014 | Hungary U19 | 10 | (3) |
| 2012–2015 | Hungary U21 | 9 | (6) |
- * Club domestic league appearances and goals as of 31 May 2026

András Radó (born 9 September 1993) is a Hungarian professional footballer who plays as an attacking midfielder for Nemzeti Bajnokság II club Vasas.

== Career ==
=== Haladás ===
In his first full season with Szombathelyi Haladás Radó scored two goals, and made eight assists. In the 2012–13 season he had seven goals and seven assists.

=== Ferencváros ===
On 2 April 2016, Radó became Hungarian League champion with Ferencváros after losing to Debrecen 2–1 at the Nagyerdei Stadion in the 2015–16 Nemzeti Bajnokság I season.

=== Puskás Akadémia ===
On 3 July 2017, Nemzeti Bajnokság I side Puskás Akadémia announced the signing of András Radó.

=== Zalaegerszeg ===
On 3 July 2019, Radó signed a "1+1" contract with newly promoted Nemzeti Bajnokság I club Zalaegerszeg.

At the end of the 2019–20 Nemzeti Bajnokság I season, he had appeared in all 33 matches and scored 13 goals, becoming the league's top scorer.

=== Vasas ===
On 20 July 2020, Radó signed a four-year contract with Vasas in the Nemzeti Bajnokság II after his contract expired, opting for the move despite receiving several foreign and domestic top-flight offers.

== Career statistics ==
As of match played 1 February 2026

Appearances and goals by club, season and competition
| Club | Season | League | | | Magyar Kupa | | Ligakupa | | Europe | | Total | |
| Club | Season | Division | Apps | Goals | Apps | Goals | Apps | Goals | Apps | Goals | Apps | Goals |
|---|---|---|---|---|---|---|---|---|---|---|---|---|
| Haladás II | 2008–09 | Nemzeti Bajnokság III | 2 | 0 | — | | — | | — | | 2 | 0 |
| Haladás II | 2009–10 | Nemzeti Bajnokság III | 17 | 8 | — | | — | | — | | 17 | 8 |
| Haladás II | 2010–11 | Nemzeti Bajnokság III | 16 | 6 | — | | — | | — | | 16 | 6 |
| Haladás II | 2011–12 | Nemzeti Bajnokság III | 7 | 2 | — | | — | | — | | 7 | 2 |
| Haladás II | Total | | 42 | 16 | — | | — | | — | | 42 | 16 |
| Haladás | 2010–11 | Nemzeti Bajnokság I | — | | 1 | 0 | 2 | 0 | — | | 3 | 0 |
| Haladás | 2011–12 | Nemzeti Bajnokság I | 12 | 2 | 1 | 0 | 3 | 0 | — | | 16 | 2 |
| Haladás | 2012–13 | Nemzeti Bajnokság I | 27 | 7 | 1 | 0 | 1 | 1 | — | | 29 | 8 |
| Haladás | 2013–14 | Nemzeti Bajnokság I | 29 | 14 | 3 | 0 | 1 | 0 | — | | 33 | 14 |
| Haladás | 2014–15 | Nemzeti Bajnokság I | 23 | 6 | — | | — | | — | | 23 | 6 |
| Haladás | Total | | 91 | 29 | 6 | 0 | 7 | 1 | — | | 104 | 30 |
| Ferencváros | 2015–16 | Nemzeti Bajnokság I | 25 | 6 | 6 | 0 | — | | 1 (Note: Appearance in UEFA Europa League) | 0 | 32 | 6 |
| Ferencváros | 2016–17 | Nemzeti Bajnokság I | 13 | 0 | 5 | 3 | — | | 1 (Note: Appearance in UEFA Champions League) | 0 | 19 | 3 |
| Ferencváros | 2017–18 | Nemzeti Bajnokság I | — | | — | | — | | 1 | 0 | 1 | 0 |
| Ferencváros | Total | | 38 | 6 | 11 | 3 | — | | 3 | 0 | 50 | 9 |
| Puskás Akadémia | 2017–18 | Nemzeti Bajnokság I | 14 | 4 | 3 | 0 | — | | — | | 17 | 4 |
| Puskás Akadémia | 2018–19 | Nemzeti Bajnokság I | 28 | 3 | 5 | 4 | — | | — | | 33 | 7 |
| Puskás Akadémia | Total | | 42 | 7 | 8 | 4 | — | | — | | 50 | 11 |
| Zalaegerszeg | 2019–20 | Nemzeti Bajnokság I | 33 | 13 | 4 | 0 | — | | — | | 37 | 13 |
| Vasas | 2020–21 | Nemzeti Bajnokság II | 37 | 13 | 1 | 0 | — | | — | | 38 | 13 |
| Vasas | 2021–22 | Nemzeti Bajnokság II | 38 | 14 | 1 | 1 | — | | — | | 39 | 15 |
| Vasas | 2022–23 | Nemzeti Bajnokság I | 18 | 1 | 4 | 0 | — | | — | | 22 | 1 |
| Vasas | 2023–24 | Nemzeti Bajnokság II | 34 | 8 | 4 | 1 | — | | — | | 38 | 9 |
| Vasas | 2024–25 | Nemzeti Bajnokság II | 23 | 5 | 1 | 0 | — | | — | | 24 | 5 |
| Vasas | 2025–26 | Nemzeti Bajnokság II | 12 | 1 | 2 | 0 | — | | — | | 14 | 1 |
| Vasas | Total | | 162 | 42 | 13 | 2 | — | | — | | 175 | 44 |
| Vasas II | 2022–23 | Nemzeti Bajnokság III | 6 | 2 | — | | — | | — | | 6 | 2 |
| Career total | | | 414 | 115 | 42 | 9 | 7 | 1 | 3 | 0 | 466 | 125 |

== Honours ==
Ferencváros

- Nemzeti Bajnokság I: 2015–16
- Magyar Kupa: 2015–16, 2016–17

Puskás Akadémia

- Magyar Kupa runner-up: 2017–18

Vasas

- Nemzeti Bajnokság II: 2021–22

Individual

- Nemzeti Bajnokság I top goalscorer: 2019–20
