= Bence Iszlai =

Hungarian footballer (born 1990)

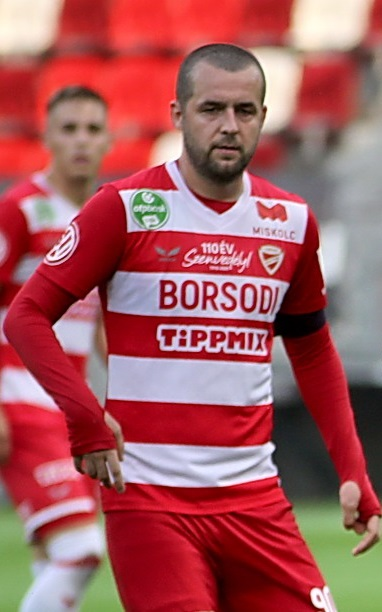
- Iszlai playing for Diósgyőr in 2020

Personal information
- Date of birth: 29 May 1990 (age 36)
- Place of birth: Veszprém, Hungary
- Height: 1.82 m (6 ft 0 in)
- Position: Midfielder

Youth career
- 2003–2007: Veszprém

Senior career*
Years	Team	Apps	(Gls)
2007–2008	Veszprém	22	(2)
2008–2014	Haladás II	27	(8)
2008–2017	Haladás	186	(16)
2017–2019	Mezőkövesd	30	(1)
2019	Mezőkövesd II	1	(0)
2019–2021	Diósgyőr	43	(8)
2021	Diósgyőr II	2	(1)
2022–2023	Veszprém	33	(6)
Total		344	(42)

International career
2007–2009	Hungary U-19	9	(0)
2011–2012	Hungary U-21	4	(1)
- * Club domestic league appearances and goals

Bence Iszlai (born 29 May 1990) is a Hungarian former professional footballer who played as a midfielder.

== Career ==
On 10 September 2019, Iszlai signed for Nemzeti Bajnokság I club Diósgyőr as a free agent.

== Career statistics ==
Appearances and goals by club, season and competition
Club	Season	League			Magyar Kupa		Ligakupa		Europe		Total	
Club	Season	Division	Apps	Goals	Apps	Goals	Apps	Goals	Apps	Goals	Apps	Goals
Veszprém	2007–08	Nemzeti Bajnokság III	22	2	2	1	—		—		24	3
Haladás II	2008–09	Nemzeti Bajnokság III	6	0	—		—		—		6	0
Haladás II	2009–10	Nemzeti Bajnokság III	6	4	—		—		—		6	4
Haladás II	2010–11	Nemzeti Bajnokság III	11	4	—		—		—		11	4
Haladás II	2012–13	Nemzeti Bajnokság II	3	0	—		—		—		3	0
Haladás II	2013–14	Nemzeti Bajnokság III	1	0	—		—		—		1	0
Haladás II	Total		27	8	—		—		—		27	8
Haladás	2008–09	Nemzeti Bajnokság I	5	0	—		7	0	—		12	0
Haladás	2009–10	Nemzeti Bajnokság I	15	0	2	0	4	2	2 (Note: Appearances in UEFA Europa League)	0	23	2
Haladás	2010–11	Nemzeti Bajnokság I	7	1	1	0	4	0	—		12	1
Haladás	2011–12	Nemzeti Bajnokság I	24	1	2	0	—		—		26	1
Haladás	2012–13	Nemzeti Bajnokság I	27	5	2	0	1	0	—		30	5
Haladás	2013–14	Nemzeti Bajnokság I	25	0	3	0	7	0	—		35	0
Haladás	2014–15	Nemzeti Bajnokság I	25	1	1	0	1	0	—		27	1
Haladás	2015–16	Nemzeti Bajnokság I	28	2	3	1	—		—		31	3
Haladás	2016–17	Nemzeti Bajnokság I	30	6	1	1	—		—		31	7
Haladás	Total		186	16	15	2	24	2	2	0	227	20
Mezőkövesd	2017–18	Nemzeti Bajnokság I	22	1	—		—		—		22	1
Mezőkövesd	2018–19	Nemzeti Bajnokság I	8	0	2	0	—		—		10	0
Mezőkövesd	2019–20	Nemzeti Bajnokság I	0	0	—		—		—		0	0
Mezőkövesd	Total		30	1	2	0	—		—		32	1
Mezőkövesd II	2018–19	Megyei Bajnokság I	1	0	—		—		—		1	0
Diósgyőr	2019–20	Nemzeti Bajnokság I	26	6	3	0	—		—		29	6
Diósgyőr	2020–21	Nemzeti Bajnokság I	17	2	2	0	—		—		19	2
Diósgyőr	Total		43	8	5	0	—		—		48	8
Diósgyőr II	2020–21	Nemzeti Bajnokság III	2	1	—		—		—		2	1
Veszprém	2022–23	Nemzeti Bajnokság III	33	6	1	0	—		—		34	6
Career total			344	42	25	3	24	2	2	0	395	47

== Honours ==
Veszprém

- Nemzeti Bajnokság III – West: 2022–23
