= Oliver Pranjic =

Austrian footballer

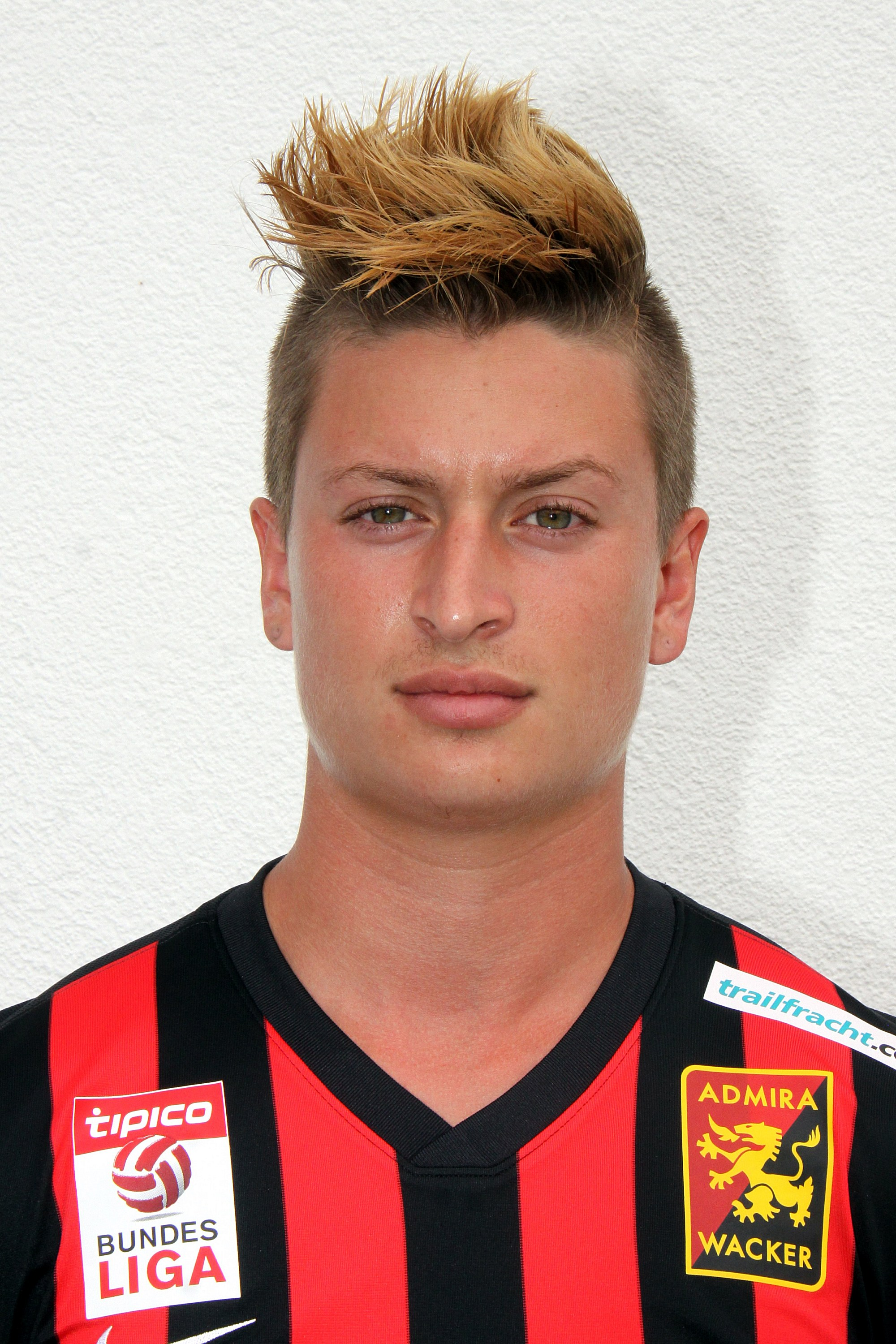
- Pranjic in 2015

Personal information
- Date of birth: 29 September 1994 (age 32)
- Place of birth: Vienna, Austria
- Height: 1.79 m (5 ft 10 in)
- Position: Midfielder

Team information
- Current team: SV Leobendorf
- Number: 11

Youth career
- 2002–2008: Rapid Wien
- 2008: Team Wiener Linien
- 2008: Rapid Wien
- 2008–2009: First Vienna
- 2009–2013: Rapid Wien

Senior career*
Years	Team	Apps	(Gls)
2012	1. Simmeringer SC	24	(1)
2013–2015	Admira Wacker	8	(0)
2014–2015	→ TSV Hartberg (loan)	12	(1)
2016–2017	SV Horn	14	(3)
2017–2018	SV Stripfing	15	(2)
2018–2022	SV Leobendorf	76	(20)
2022–2023	TWL Elektra	26	(7)
2023–	SV Leobendorf	80	(34)
- * Club domestic league appearances and goals as of 28 June 2026

Oliver Pranjic (born 29 September 1994) is an Austrian footballer who plays for SV Leobendorf.
