= Sonnhofen =

- Former municipality
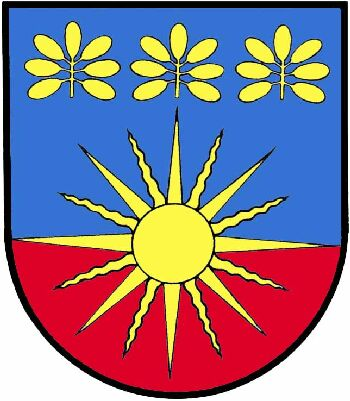
- Coat of arms

- Location within Austria
- Coordinates: 47°20′52″N 15°48′37″E
- Country: Austria
- State: Styria
- District: Hartberg-Fürstenfeld

Area
  - Total: 21.24 km^{2} (8.20 sq mi)
- Elevation: 760 m (2,490 ft)

Population (1 January 2016)
  - Total: 1,026
  - Density: 48.31/km^{2} (125.1/sq mi)
- Time zone: UTC+1 (CET)
  - Summer (DST): UTC+2 (CEST)
- Postal code: 8225, 8250
- Area code: +43 3335
- Vehicle registration: HB
- Website: www.sonnhofen. steiermark.at

Sonnhofen is a former municipality in the district of Hartberg-Fürstenfeld in Styria, Austria. Since the 2015 Styria municipal structural reform, it is part of the municipality Pöllau.
