= Vönöck =

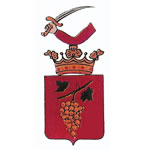
- Coat of arms

- Location of Vönöck in Hungary
- Coordinates: 47°18′46.22″N 17°9′29.92″E
- Country: Hungary
- Region: Western Transdanubia
- County: Vas
- Subregion: Celldömölki
- Rank: Village

Area
  - Total: 17.60 km^{2} (6.80 sq mi)

Population (1 January 2008)
  - Total: 768
  - Density: 43.6/km^{2} (113/sq mi)
- Time zone: UTC+1 (CET)
  - Summer (DST): UTC+2 (CEST)
- Postal code: 9516
- Area code: +36 95
- KSH code: 03142
- Website: http://www.vonock.hu/

Vönöck is a village in Vas county, Hungary.
