= Bence Gyurján =

Hungarian footballer

Personal information
- Date of birth: 21 February 1992 (age 34)
- Place of birth: Nyíregyháza, Hungary
- Height: 1.70 m (5 ft 7 in)
- Position: Midfielder

Team information
- Current team: Tiszakécske
- Number: 70

Youth career
- 2002–2007: Nyíregyháza
- 2007–2010: Haladás

Senior career*
Years	Team	Apps	(Gls)
2010–2015	Haladás	44	(2)
2015–2017	Gyirmót	23	(2)
2017–2018	Békéscsaba	33	(3)
2018–2020	Nyíregyháza	40	(2)
2020–	Tiszakécske	78	(7)

International career^{‡}
2012	Hungary U-20	2	(0)
2012–2014	Hungary U-21	7	(1)
- * Club domestic league appearances and goals as of 21 December 2023 ‡ National team caps and goals as of 5 March 2014

Bence Gyurján (born 21 February 1992) is a Hungarian football player who plays for Tiszakécske. His brother Márton is a footballer too.

== Career statistics ==
Appearances and goals by club, season and competition
Club	Season	League			Cup		League Cup		Europe		Total	
Club	Season	Division	Apps	Goals	Apps	Goals	Apps	Goals	Apps	Goals	Apps	Goals
Haladás
Haladás	2008–09	Nemzeti Bajnokság I	0	0	0	0	1	0	0	0	1	0
Haladás	2009–10	Nemzeti Bajnokság I	0	0	1	0	3	0	0	0	4	0
Haladás	2010–11	Nemzeti Bajnokság I	1	0	1	1	3	1	0	0	5	2
Haladás	2011–12	Nemzeti Bajnokság I	1	0	0	0	2	0	0	0	3	0
Haladás	2012–13	Nemzeti Bajnokság I	10	0	0	0	1	0	0	0	11	0
Haladás	2013–14	Nemzeti Bajnokság I	26	1	3	0	5	2	0	0	34	3
Haladás	2014–15	Nemzeti Bajnokság I	6	1	2	3	3	0	0	0	11	4
Haladás	Total		44	2	7	4	18	3	0	0	69	9
Career total			44	2	7	4	18	3	0	0	69	9

Updated to games played as of 26 October 2014.
