= Milán Kalász =

Hungarian footballer

Personal information
- Full name: Milán Kalász
- Date of birth: 30 April 1992 (age 34)
- Place of birth: Ajka, Hungary
- Height: 1.78 m (5 ft 10 in)
- Position: Midfielder

Youth career
- 2003–2007: Ajka
- 2007–2012: Haladás

Senior career*
Years	Team	Apps	(Gls)
2012–2014	Haladás	16	(2)
- * Club domestic league appearances and goals as of 22 September 2013

Milán Kalász (born 30 April 1992 in Ajka) is a Hungarian football player. He is currently a free agent.

== Career statistics ==
Appearances and goals by club, season and competition
Club	Season	League			Cup		League Cup		Europe		Total	
Club	Season	Division	Apps	Goals	Apps	Goals	Apps	Goals	Apps	Goals	Apps	Goals
Szombathely
Szombathely	2008–09	Nemzeti Bajnokság I	0	0	0	0	4	0	0	0	4	0
Szombathely	2009–10	Nemzeti Bajnokság I	0	0	0	0	0	0	0	0	0	0
Szombathely	2010–11	Nemzeti Bajnokság I	0	0	0	0	0	0	0	0	0	0
Szombathely	2011–12	Nemzeti Bajnokság I	0	0	0	0	3	0	0	0	3	0
Szombathely	2012–13	Nemzeti Bajnokság I	13	2	0	0	2	0	0	0	15	2
Szombathely	2013–14	Nemzeti Bajnokság I	3	0	0	0	2	0	0	0	5	0
Szombathely	Total		16	2	0	0	11	0	0	0	27	2
Career total			16	2	0	0	11	0	0	0	27	2

Updated to games played as of 22 September 2013.
