= Márió Németh =

Hungarian footballer (born 1995)

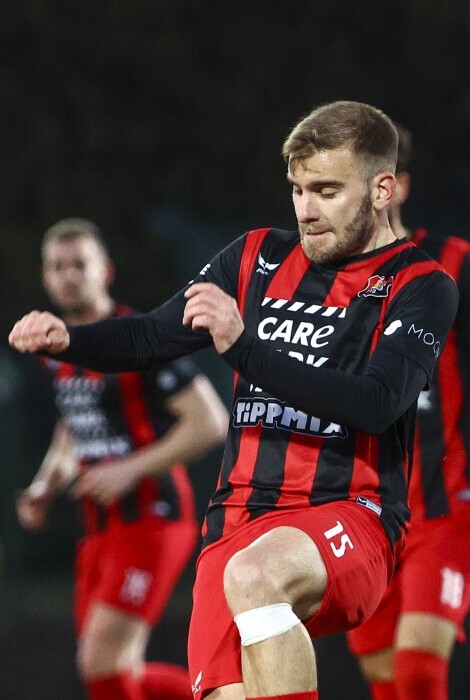
- Németh playing for Budafok in 2023

Personal information
- Date of birth: 1 May 1995 (age 31)
- Place of birth: Sárvár, Hungary
- Height: 1.70 m (5 ft 7 in)
- Position: Midfielder

Team information
- Current team: Budafok
- Number: 8

Youth career
- 2003–2006: Répcelak
- 2006–2012: Haladás

Senior career*
Years	Team	Apps	(Gls)
2012–2021	Haladás	186	(27)
2021–2022	Diósgyőr	26	(2)
2022–	Budafok	116	(3)

International career^{‡}
2011–2013	Hungary U-17	1	(0)
2013–2014	Hungary U-19	4	(1)
2015	Hungary U-20	5	(2)
- * Club domestic league appearances and goals as of 31 May 2026 ‡ National team caps and goals as of 24 September 2015

Márió Németh (born 1 May 1995) is a Hungarian professional footballer who plays as a midfielder for Nemzeti Bajnokság II club Szentlőrinc.

== Club career ==
After spending the first 10 seasons of his senior career with Haladás, on 2 June 2021 Németh moved to Diósgyőr.

On 1 July 2022, Németh signed with Budafok.

== International career ==
He was part of the Hungarian U-19 at the 2014 UEFA European Under-19 Championship and U-20 team at the 2015 FIFA U-20 World Cup.

== Career statistics ==
Appearances and goals by club, season and competition
Club	Season	League			Cup		League Cup		Europe		Total	
Club	Season	Division	Apps	Goals	Apps	Goals	Apps	Goals	Apps	Goals	Apps	Goals
Haladás	2012–13	Nemzeti Bajnokság I	6	0	0	0	3	0	0	0	9	0
Haladás	2013–14	Nemzeti Bajnokság I	25	2	2	0	3	1	0	0	30	3
Haladás	2014–15	Nemzeti Bajnokság I	15	1	3	2	5	0	0	0	23	3
Haladás	2015–16	Nemzeti Bajnokság I	31	7	1	0	—		—		32	7
Haladás	2016–17	Nemzeti Bajnokság I	11	1	0	0	—		—		11	1
Haladás	2017–18	Nemzeti Bajnokság I	21	2	1	0	—		—		22	2
Haladás	2018–19	Nemzeti Bajnokság I	20	1	3	0	—		—		23	1
Career total			129	14	10	2	11	1	0	0	150	17

Updated to games played as of 19 May 2019.
