= Zoltán Búrány =

Hungarian footballer

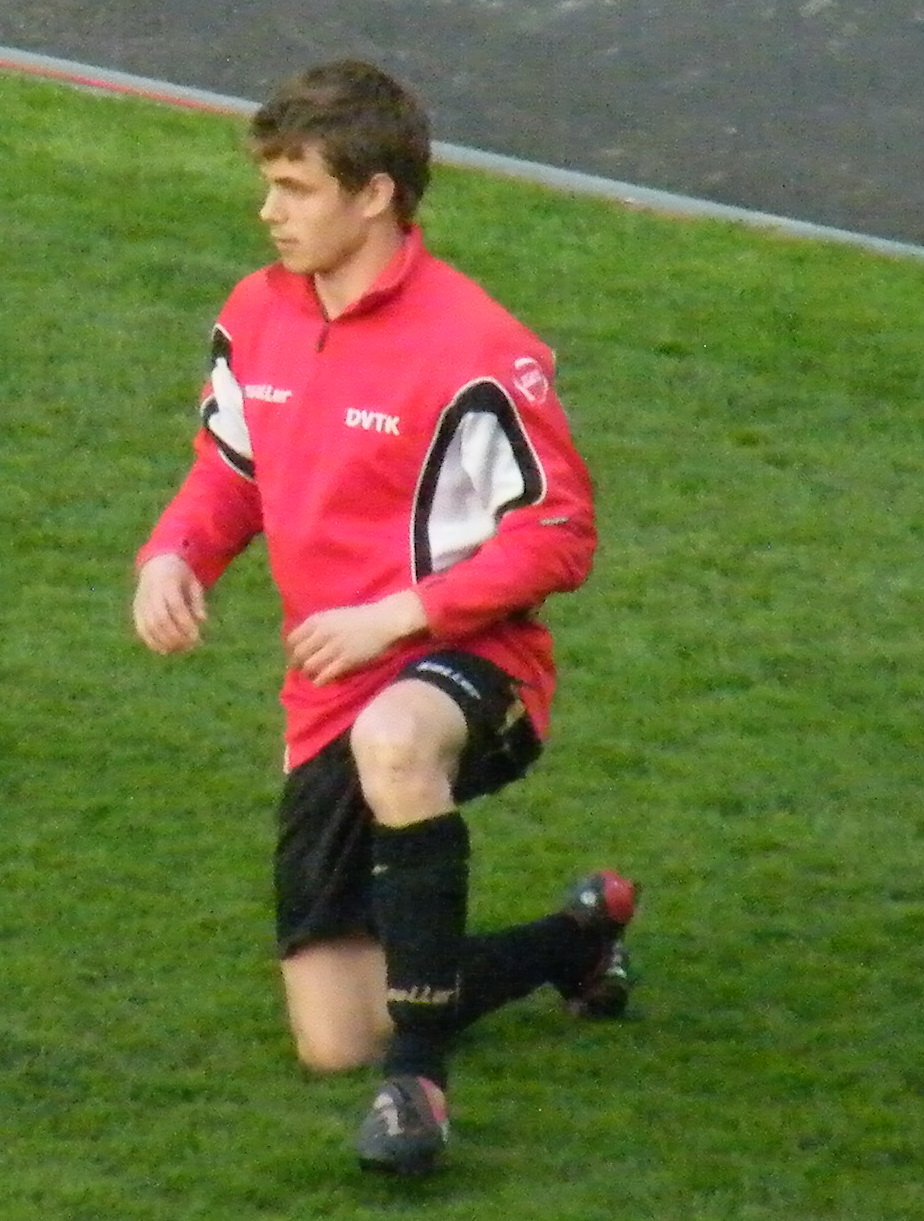

Personal information
- Full name: Zoltán Búrány
- Date of birth: 26 July 1989 (age 37)
- Place of birth: Subotica, SFR Yugoslavia
- Height: 1.75 m (5 ft 9 in)
- Position: Defensive midfielder

Team information
- Current team: Taksony

Senior career*
Years	Team	Apps	(Gls)
2006–2008	Tisza Volán	55	(11)
2008–2010	Diósgyőr	39	(1)
2010–2011	Szolnok	24	(0)
2011–2013	Haladás	38	(0)
2013–2015	Mezőkövesd	32	(0)
2015–2016	Szolnok	13	(0)
2016–2017	SZEOL	20	(0)
2017–2019	Vác	52	(0)
2019–	Taksony		

International career
2008–2009	Hungary U-19		
- * Club domestic league appearances and goals as of 9 November 2017

Zoltán Búrány (Serbian: Золтан Бурањ, Zoltan Buranj; born 26 July 1989) is a Hungarian football player who plays for Taksony SE.
