= Ádám Simon =

Hungarian footballer

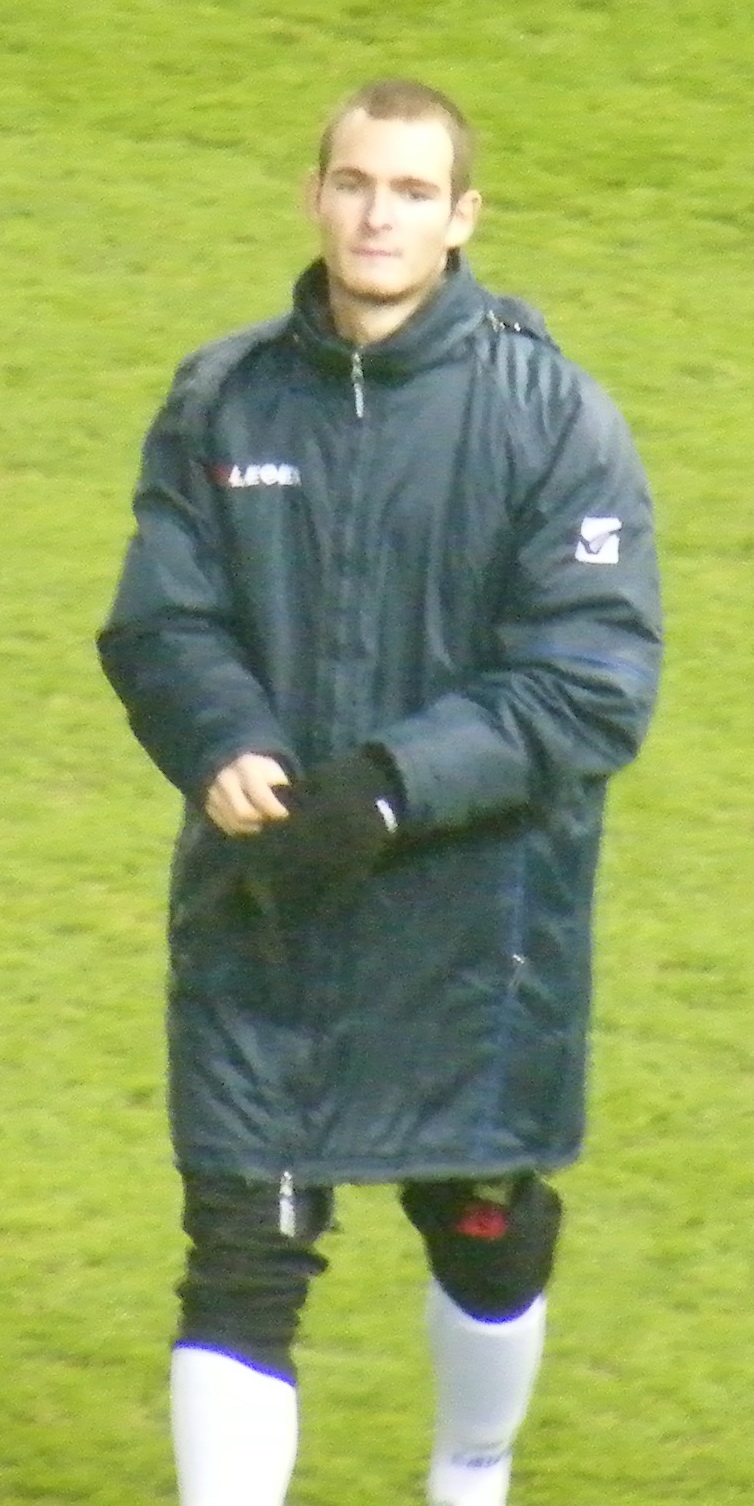

Personal information
- Full name: Ádám Simon
- Date of birth: 30 March 1990 (age 36)
- Place of birth: Salgótarján, Hungary
- Height: 1.78 m (5 ft 10 in)
- Position: Defensive midfielder

Youth career
- –2004: Salgótarján
- 2004–2006: MTK
- 2006–2008: Haladás

Senior career*
Years	Team	Apps	(Gls)
2008–2011	Haladás	44	(3)
2011–2014	Palermo	0	(0)
2012	→ Bari (loan)	2	(0)
2012–2014	→ Haladás (loan)	47	(1)
2014–2017	Videoton	49	(1)
2017	→ Gyirmót (loan)	10	(0)
2017	Haladás	7	(0)
2017–2020	Paks	36	(2)
2020	Győr	4	(0)
2020–2023	Szeged-Csanád	80	(3)

International career
2006–2007	Hungary U17	8	(0)
2008–2009	Hungary U19	5	(0)
2009	Hungary U20	6	(0)
2010–2012	Hungary U21	13	(0)
2014–2015	Hungary	3	(0)
Medal record
Representing Hungary
Men's football
FIFA U-20 World Cup
Third place	2009 Egypt
- * Club domestic league appearances and goals

Ádám Simon (born 30 March 1990) is a Hungarian former footballer. He is the twin brother of ex-Liverpool player, András Simon.

== Career ==
=== Szombathelyi Haladás ===
He played his first match in Szombathely on 15 November 2008. He played 44 matches in the Hungarian National Championship I and scored 3 goals, one of which was elected the most beautiful goal of the 2010–11 Nemzeti Bajnokság I season. He scored a goal from 30 meters.

=== Palermo ===
On 8 June 2011, Simon officially moved to Palermo for €980,000. On 24 January 2012, he went on loan to Bari in Serie B, in the transfer that leads to Palermo Massimo Donati. In January 2012, Simon was transferred to Serie B club Bari on loan. Simon made his debut against Nocerina on 4 February 2012 in the 81st minute. In August 2012, he returned to Szombathelyi Haladás on loan. The loan was extended for one more season in July 2013.

On 15 July 2014, Palermo announced to have released Simon for free.

=== Videoton ===
On 16 July 2014, Simon was signed by Hungarian League club Videoton FC. Simon signes a four-year contract with the Székesfehérvár-based club.

== International career ==
Simon was a stable member of U-17, U-19, and also the U-21 teams of Hungary. He was a member of the U-20 Hungary team which won a bronze medal in the FIFA U-20 World Cup in 2009 in Egypt. He participated in the 2011 Toulon Tournament with the U-21.

== Career statistics ==
Appearances and goals by club, season and competition
Club	Season	League			Cup		League Cup		Europe		Total	
Club	Season	Division	Apps	Goals	Apps	Goals	Apps	Goals	Apps	Goals	Apps	Goals
Haladás
Haladás	2008–09	Nemzeti Bajnokság I	2	0	1	0	8	0	—		11	0
Haladás	2009–10	Nemzeti Bajnokság I	16	2	1	0	2	0	0	0	19	2
Haladás	2010–11	Nemzeti Bajnokság I	27	1	2	0	3	0	—		32	1
Haladás	2012–13	Nemzeti Bajnokság I	17	1	1	0	1	0	—		19	1
Haladás	2013–14	Nemzeti Bajnokság I	26	0	3	0	6	0	—		35	0
Haladás	2017–18	Nemzeti Bajnokság I	7	0	0	0	—		—		7	0
Haladás	Total		95	4	8	0	20	0	0	0	123	4
Bari	2011–12	Serie B	2	0	0	0	—		—		2	0
Videoton
Videoton	2014–15	Nemzeti Bajnokság I	28	0	4	0	5	0	0	0	37	0
Videoton	2015–16	Nemzeti Bajnokság I	20	1	3	0	—		4	0	27	1
Videoton	2016–17	Nemzeti Bajnokság I	1	0	0	0	—		3	0	4	0
Videoton	Total		49	1	7	0	5	0	7	0	68	1
Gyirmót	2016–17	Nemzeti Bajnokság I	10	0	0	0	—		—		10	0
Paks
Paks	2017–18	Nemzeti Bajnokság I	23	2	2	0	—		—		25	2
Paks	2018–19	Nemzeti Bajnokság I	4	0	0	0	—		—		4	0
Paks	2019–20	Nemzeti Bajnokság I	9	0	0	0	—		—		9	0
Paks	Total		36	2	2	0	0	0	0	0	38	2
Career total			192	7	17	0	25	0	7	0	241	7

Updated to games played as of 15 December 2019.

== Honours ==
- FIFA U-20 World Cup:
  - Third place: 2009
