= Attila Szakály =

Hungarian footballer (born 1992)

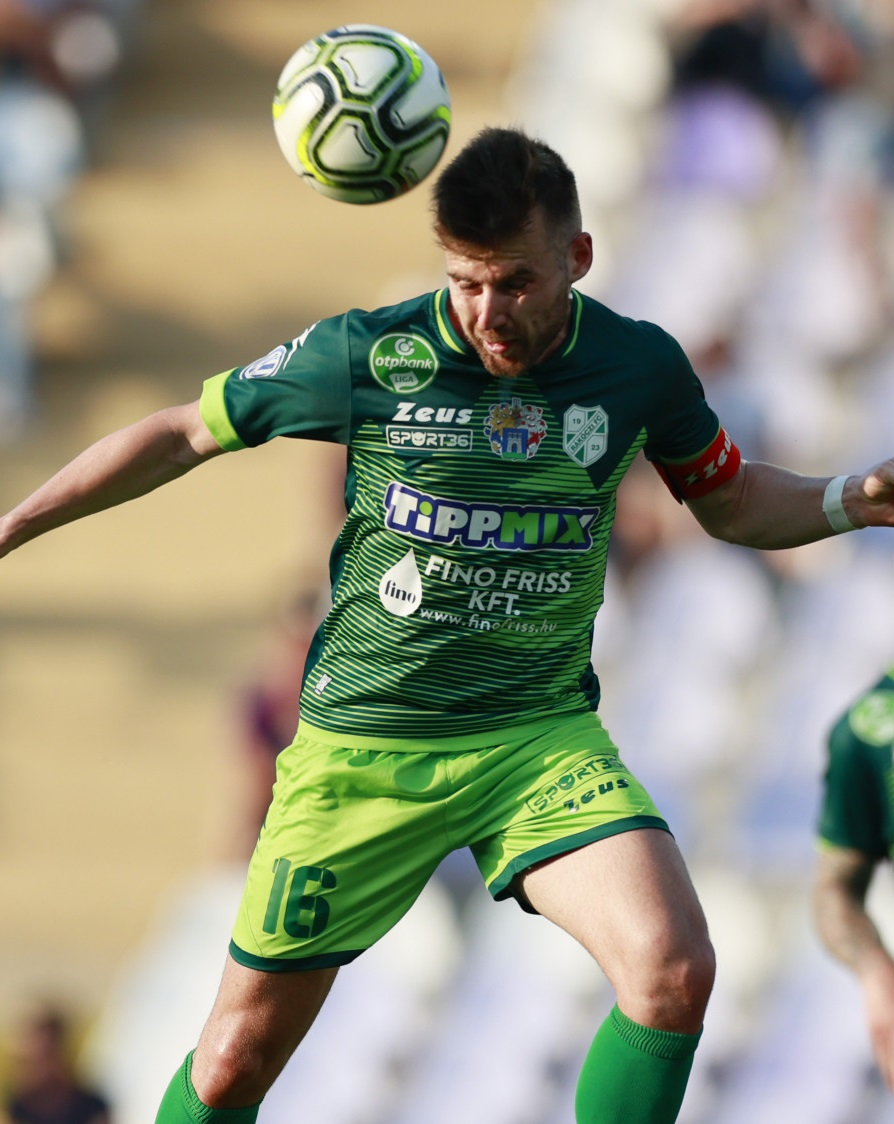
- Szakály playing for Kaposvár in 2020

Personal information
- Date of birth: 30 June 1992 (age 34)
- Place of birth: Körmend, Hungary
- Height: 1.81 m (5 ft 11 in)
- Position: Midfielder

Team information
- Current team: Haladás
- Number: 6

Youth career
- 2007–2012: Haladás

Senior career*
Years	Team	Apps	(Gls)
2012–2015	Haladás	34	(0)
2015–2017	Zalaegerszeg	53	(2)
2017–2021	Kaposvár	113	(12)
2021–2023	Siófok	82	(7)
2023–	Haladás	14	(0)

International career
2012–2014	Hungary U-21	9	(0)
- * Club domestic league appearances and goals as of 21 December 2023

Attila Szakály (born 30 June 1992) is a Hungarian football player who plays for Szombathelyi Haladás.

== Career statistics ==
Appearances and goals by club, season and competition
Club	Season	League		Cup		League Cup		Europe		Total	
Club	Season	Apps	Goals	Apps	Goals	Apps	Goals	Apps	Goals	Apps	Goals
Szombathely
Szombathely	2008–09	0	0	0	0	2	0	–	–	2	0
Szombathely	2009–10	0	0	0	0	4	0	–	–	4	0
Szombathely	2010–11	0	0	1	0	3	0	–	–	4	0
Szombathely	2011–12	2	0	0	0	5	0	–	–	7	0
Szombathely	2012–13	8	0	1	0	2	0	–	–	11	0
Szombathely	2013–14	13	0	3	0	2	0	–	–	18	0
Szombathely	2014–15	11	0	3	0	6	0	–	–	20	0
Szombathely	Total	34	0	8	0	24	0	0	0	66	0
Zalaegerszeg
Zalaegerszeg	2014–15	12	0	0	0	0	0	–	–	12	0
Zalaegerszeg	2015–16	28	1	2	2	–	–	–	–	30	3
Zalaegerszeg	2016–17	13	1	3	2	–	–	–	–	16	3
Zalaegerszeg	Total	53	2	5	4	0	0	0	0	58	6
Kaposvár
Kaposvár	2016–17	15	5	0	0	–	–	–	–	15	5
Kaposvár	2017–18	28	4	1	0	–	–	–	–	29	4
Kaposvár	2018–19	36	5	1	0	–	–	–	–	37	5
Kaposvár	2019–20	31	2	4	0	–	–	–	–	35	2
Kaposvár	Total	110	16	6	0	0	0	0	0	116	16
Career total		197	18	19	4	24	0	0	0	240	22

Updated to games played as of 27 June 2020.
