= Richárd Guzmics =

Hungarian footballer

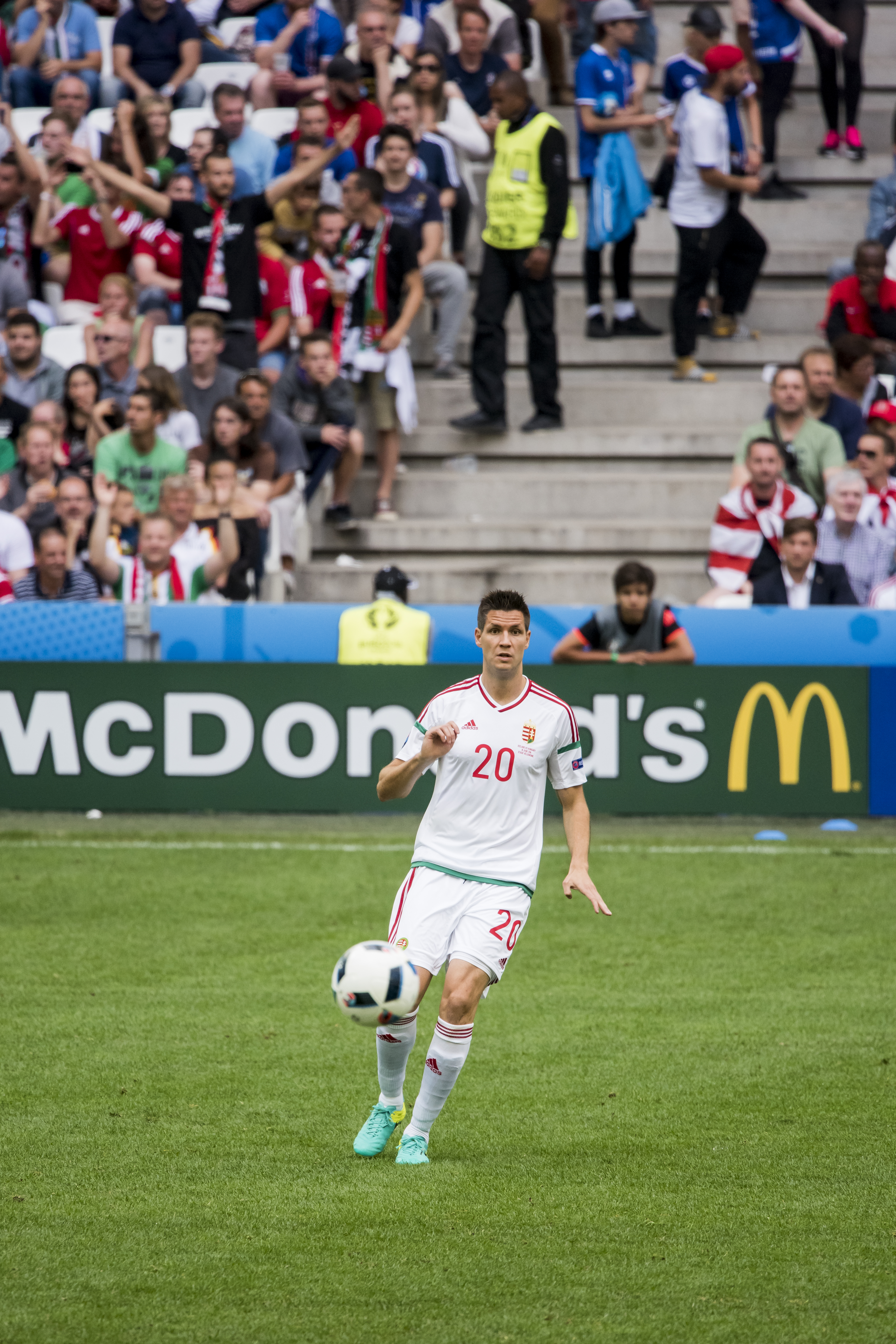
- Guzmics with Hungary at UEFA Euro 2016

Personal information
- Date of birth: 16 April 1987 (age 39)
- Place of birth: Szombathely, Hungary
- Height: 1.90 m (6 ft 3 in)
- Position: Centre-back

Youth career
- 2002–2005: Szombathelyi Haladás

Senior career*
Years	Team	Apps	(Gls)
2005–2014	Szombathelyi Haladás	247	(8)
2014–2017	Wisła Kraków	65	(1)
2017–2019	Yanbian Funde	37	(2)
2019–2020	Slovan Bratislava	14	(0)
2020–2021	Mezőkövesd	6	(0)
2021–2022	Szombathelyi Haladás	17	(0)
Total		386	(11)

International career
2005–2006	Hungary U19	18	(1)
2007–2008	Hungary U21	1	(0)
2012–2018	Hungary	27	(2)
- * Club domestic league appearances and goals

Richárd Guzmics (Hungarian pronunciation: [ˈriɦaːrd ˈɡuzmit͡ʃ], born 16 April 1987) is a Hungarian former professional footballer who plays as a centre-back. He is a product of the Szombathelyi Haladás youth academy.

== Club career ==
=== Wisla Krakow ===
On 10 September 2014, Guzmics was signed by Ekstraklasa club Wisla Krakow.

On 18 December 2014, Guzmics suffered a knee injury on the last match of the year against Ruch Chorzów in the 2014–15 Ekstraklasa season.

=== Yanbian Funde ===
On 5 January 2017, it was officially announced that Guzmics had signed for Yanbian Funde

=== Slovan Bratislava ===
On 26 January 2019, Guzmics returned to Europa signing for Slovan Bratislava.

== International career ==
Guzmics gained notoriety in his international career against an ill-fated match against arch-rivals Romania, when in the second minute his defensive fumble allowed Ciprian Marica to score an early goal - the match would end with 3–0, with Guzmics being universally blamed for it, a blame he accepted. On 7 September 2015, Guzmics scored his first goal for Hungary in a 1–1 draw against Northern Ireland at the Windsor Park, in Belfast, Northern Ireland. After his performance against Norway, he was selected as one of the best defenders of the playoffs.

Guzmics was selected for Hungary's Euro 2016 squad.

On 14 June 2016, Guzmics played in the first group match in a 2–0 victory over Austria at the UEFA Euro 2016 Group F match at Nouveau Stade de Bordeaux, Bordeaux, France. Three days later on 18 June 2016 he played in a 1–1 draw against Iceland at the Stade Vélodrome, Marseille. He also played in the last group match in a 3–3 draw against Portugal at the Parc Olympique Lyonnais, Lyon on 22 June 2016.

== Career statistics ==
=== Club ===
Appearances and goals by club, season and competition
Club	Season	League			Cup		League Cup		Europe		Total	
Club	Season	Division	Apps	Goals	Apps	Goals	Apps	Goals	Apps	Goals	Apps	Goals
Szombathely	2004–05	Nemzeti Bajnokság II	5	0	0	0	0	0	—		5	0
Szombathely	2005–06	Nemzeti Bajnokság II	24	1	0	0	0	0	—		24	1
Szombathely	2006–07	Nemzeti Bajnokság II	25	2	0	0	0	0	—		25	2
Szombathely	2007–08	Nemzeti Bajnokság II	25	2	0	0	0	0	—		25	2
Szombathely	2008–09	Nemzeti Bajnokság I	30	1	4	1	1	0	—		35	2
Szombathely	2009–10	Nemzeti Bajnokság I	29	1	3	0	1	0	4	0	37	1
Szombathely	2010–11	Nemzeti Bajnokság I	28	0	2	0	2	0	—		32	0
Szombathely	2011–12	Nemzeti Bajnokság I	27	0	2	0	2	0	—		31	0
Szombathely	2012–13	Nemzeti Bajnokság I	28	0	0	0	1	0	—		29	0
Szombathely	2013–14	Nemzeti Bajnokság I	26	1	1	0	3	0	—		30	1
Szombathely	Total		247	8	12	1	10	0	4	0	273	9
Wisła Kraków	2014–15	Ekstraklasa	21	0	1	0	—		—		22	0
Wisła Kraków	2015–16	Ekstraklasa	33	0	0	0	—		—		33	0
Wisła Kraków	2016–17	Ekstraklasa	11	1	2	0	—		—		13	1
Wisła Kraków	Total		65	1	3	0	—		—		68	1
Yanbian Funde	2017	Chinese Super League	19	1	0	0	—		—		19	1
Yanbian Funde	2018	China League One	18	1	0	0	—		—		18	1
Yanbian Funde	Total		37	2	0	0	—		—		37	2
Slovan Bratislava	2018–19	Slovak Super Liga	10	0	0	0	—		—		10	0
Slovan Bratislava	2019–20	Slovak Super Liga	4	0	0	0	—		0	0	4	0
Slovan Bratislava	Total		14	0	0	0	—		0	0	14	0
Mezőkövesd	2019–20	Nemzeti Bajnokság I	3	0	0	0	—		—		3	0
Mezőkövesd	2020–21	Nemzeti Bajnokság I	3	0	0	0	—		—		3	0
Mezőkövesd	Total		6	0	0	0	—		—		6	0
Szombathely	2021–22	Nemzeti Bajnokság II	17	0	0	0	—		—		17	0
Career total			386	11	15	1	10	0	4	0	415	12

=== International ===
Appearances and goals by national team and year
National team	Year	Apps	Goals
Hungary	2012	1	0
Hungary	2013	6	0
Hungary	2014	0	0
Hungary	2015	5	1
Hungary	2016	10	0
Hungary	2017	4	1
Total		26	2

Scores and results list Hungary's goal tally first, score column indicates score after each Guzmics goal.

List of international goals scored by Richárd Guzmics
No.	Date	Venue	Opponent	Score	Result	Competition
1	7 September 2015	Windsor Park, Belfast, Northern Ireland	Northern Ireland	1–0	1–1	UEFA Euro 2016 qualification
2	7 October 2017	St. Jakob-Park, Basel, Switzerland	Switzerland	1–4	2–5	2018 FIFA World Cup qualification

== Honours ==
Slovan Bratislava

- Slovak Super Liga: 2018–19
