= Zoltán Fehér =

Hungarian footballer

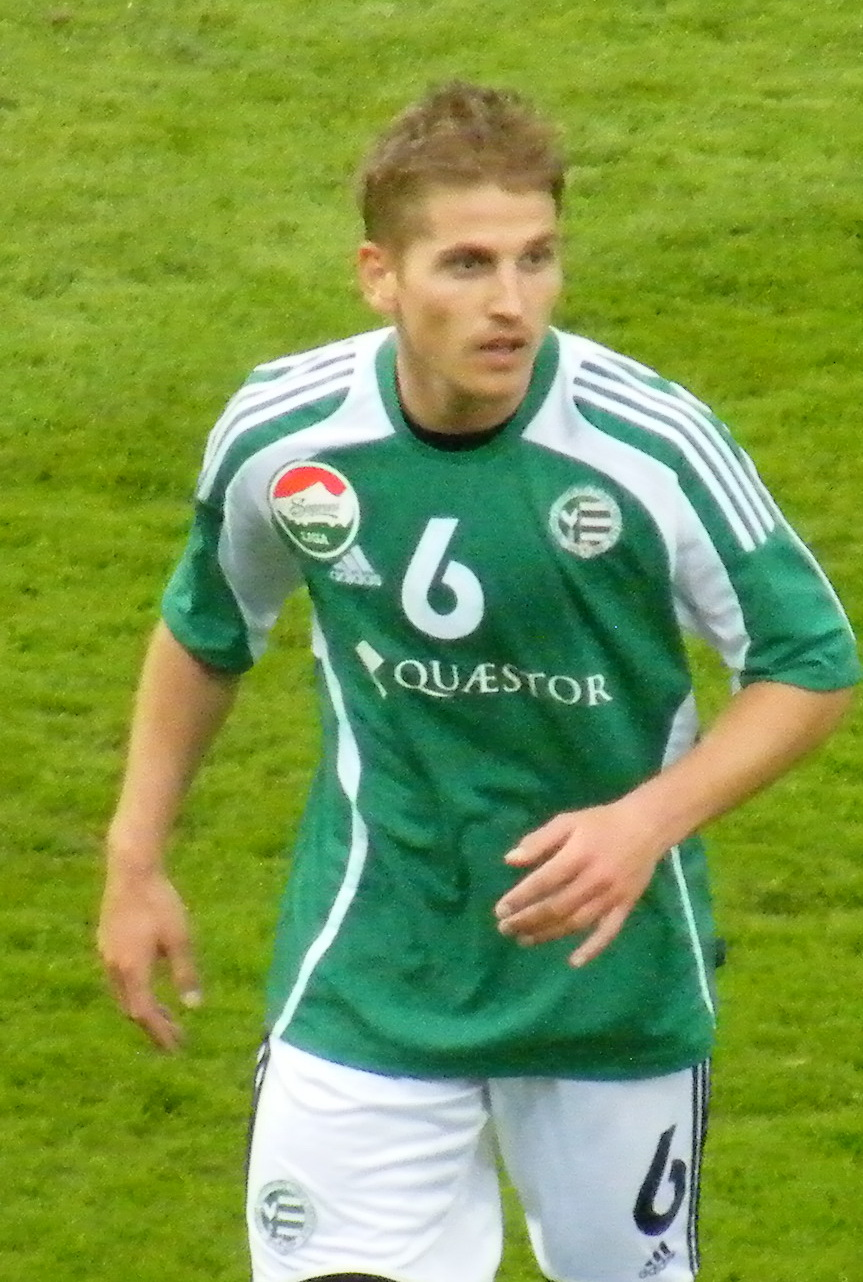

Personal information
- Date of birth: 12 June 1981 (age 45)
- Place of birth: Szabadszállás, Hungary
- Height: 1.78 m (5 ft 10 in)
- Position: Centre back

Youth career
- 1997–1998: Ferencváros
- 1998–2000: BVSC

Senior career*
| Years | Team | Apps | (Gls) |
| 2000–2002 | Rákospalota | 37 | (0) |
| 2002–2006 | Sopron | 92 | (1) |
| 2006–2007 | Vasas | 27 | (0) |
| 2007–2008 | Sopron | 13 | (0) |
| 2008–2009 | Vihren Sandanski | 28 | (3) |
| 2009–2012 | Győr | 65 | (0) |
| 2012–2017 | Haladás | 72 | (5) |
| 2016–2017 | → Soproni (loan) | 11 | (0) |
| 2017–2018 | Soproni | 12 | (0) |
| 2018 | ASK Tschurndorf/Kalkgruben | | |

International career
| 1999–2000 | Hungary U-18 | 1 | (0) |
- * Club domestic league appearances and goals

Zoltán Fehér (born 12 June 1981) is a Hungarian former football defender.

Fehér started his career in the well known Ferencvárosi TC soccer team. In 2000, he signed over to Rákospalotai EAC. In June 2002, he transferred to FC Sopron. Three years later Zoltán played for the now dissolved Vasas SC, from which he eventually went back to his early team, the FC Sopron. In January 2008 he signed a contract with the Bulgarian club FC Vihren Sandanski, where he performed quite well. Currently (2013) plays at Szombathelyi Haladás.
