= Péter Andorka =

Hungarian footballer

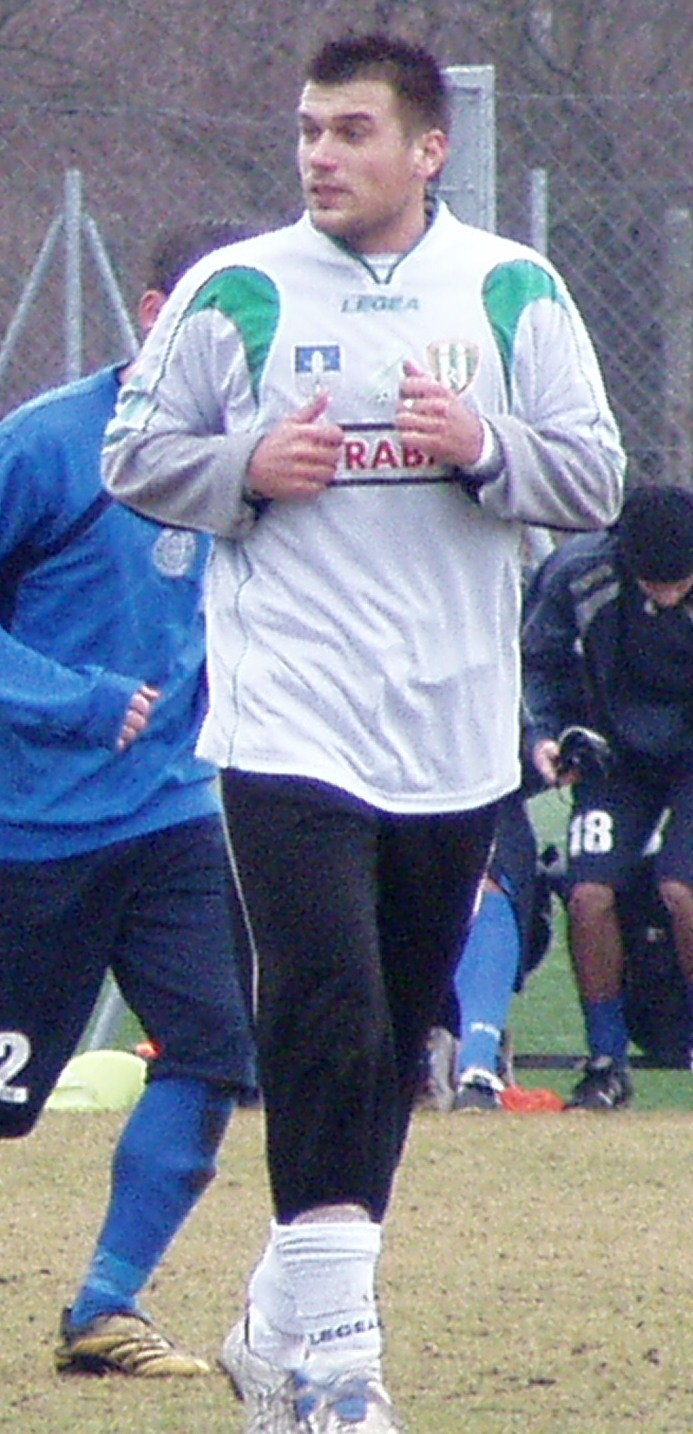

Personal information
- Date of birth: 19 July 1984 (age 42)
- Place of birth: Veszprém, Hungary
- Height: 1.83 m (6 ft 0 in)
- Position: Striker

Youth career
- 1998–2000: Veszprém
- 2000–2002: Haladás

Senior career*
Years	Team	Apps	(Gls)
2002–2005	Debrecen	25	(3)
2005–2006	Zalaegerszeg	14	(3)
2006	Pécs	10	(0)
2006–2009	Haladás	87	(64)
2009–2011	Nyíregyháza	53	(22)
2011–2012	Pécs	21	(4)
2012–2014	Haladás	30	(6)
2014–2015	Gyirmót	22	(4)
2015	BFC Siófok	14	(8)
2015–2017	Szeged	46	(4)
2017–2019	Kaposvár	35	(12)
2019–2020	Szeged-Csanád	30	(6)

International career
2002–2003	Hungary U-19	6	(2)
2003–2004	Hungary U-20	5	(2)
2004–2005	Hungary U-21	2	(0)
- * Club domestic league appearances and goals

Péter Andorka (born 19 July 1984) is a Hungarian former football player.

== Club career ==
Andorka started his career at Debreceni VSC. Over a four-year period he netted three times in twenty-five games. On 24 January 2005 Andorka moved to Zalaegerszegi TE on a free transfer where he scored three goals in his only season with the club. A short and unsuccessful move to Pécsi MFC followed with Andorka failing to find the net in ten games. This led to his transfer on 26 January 2006 to Szombathelyi Haladás VSE. This was Andorka's most successful spell in club football. Over a four-year period he scored 64 times, endearing himself to the fans in the process.

Andorka currently plays for Kaposvári Rákóczi FC who operate in the second division of Hungarian football.

Despite making appearances for Hungary at youth level, Andorka has failed to break into the senior side at any point during his professional career.

== Honours ==
- Debreceni VSC:
  - NB I:
    Third place: 2002/2003 2003/2004
  - Hungarian Cup:
    Runners-up: 2003
- Szombathelyi Haladás:
  - NB I:
    Third place: 2008/2009
  - NB II Nyugat:
    Winner: 2007/2008
