= 2015–16 Szombathelyi Haladás season =

2015–16 season
- Chairman: Béla Illés
- Manager: Géza Mészöly
- NB 1: 5th
- Hungarian Cup: Round of 16
- Top goalscorer: League: Márió Németh (7); Bálint Gaál (7); All: Bálint Gaál (9)
- Highest home attendance: 4,395 vs Ferencváros (19 July 2015)
- Lowest home attendance: 1,117 vs Vasas (6 April 2016)
Home colours	Away colours

Karlo Lovric

== Players ==
As of 20 January 2014. Note: Flags indicate national team as defined under FIFA eligibility rules; some limited exceptions apply. Players may hold more than one non-FIFA nationality.

No.	Pos.	Nation	Player
1	GK	HUN	Gábor Király
3	DF	HUN	Zoltán Fehér
4	DF	HUN	Gábor Jánvári
6	DF	BEL	Stef Wils
7	MF	HUN	Gergely Gyürki
8	MF	HUN	Ádám Dudás
10	FW	ITA	Leandro Martínez
11	FW	AUS	David Williams
14	MF	HUN	Bálint Gaál
15	MF	HUN	Bence Iszlai
17	MF	HUN	Patrik Nagy
20	MF	BEL	Thomas Wils
23	DF	HUN	Szabolcs Schimmer
24	DF	HUN	Zsolt Angyal

No.	Pos.	Nation	Player
25	MF	CRO	Ante Batarelo
26	DF	HUN	Márk Jagodics
27	MF	HUN	Lóránt Kovács
31	MF	HUN	Márió Németh
35	DF	HUN	Predrag Bošnjak
44	GK	HUN	Márton Gyurján
66	GK	HUN	Dániel Rózsa
70	FW	HUN	Roland Ugrai
77	FW	HUN	Zoltán Medgyes
79	MF	HUN	Péter Halmosi (captain)
80	MF	HUN	Balázs Petró
89	FW	ROU	Sasa Popin
90	DF	HUN	Máté Katona

=== Summer ===
In: Note: Flags indicate national team as defined under FIFA eligibility rules; some limited exceptions apply. Players may hold more than one non-FIFA nationality.

No.	Pos.	Nation	Player
—	GK	HUN	Gábor Király (from (England) Fulham F.C.)
—	DF	HUN	Predrag Bošnjak (from Ferencvárosi TC)
—	DF	HUN	Martin Zsirai (return loan from FC Ajka)
—	DF	BEL	Stef Wils (from (Belgium) Cercle Bruges)
—	DF	ITA	Raffaele Alcibiade (from Budapest Honvéd)
—	DF	HUN	Márk Farkas (return loan from Várda SE)
—	MF	UKR	Andriy Efremov (return loan from (Slovakia) TJ OFC Gabčíkovo)
—	MF	HUN	Olivér Nagy (return loan from (Romania) FC Ceahlăul Piatra Neamț)
—	MF	HUN	Kornél Kulcsár (return loan from Mezőkövesd-Zsóry SE)
—	MF	HUN	András Gosztonyi (from Diósgyőri VTK)
—	MF	BEL	Thomas Wils (from (Belgium) Lierse S.K.)
—	MF	CRO	Ante Batarelo (from Balmazújvárosi FC)
—	FW	HUN	Zoltán Medgyes (return loan from Mezőkövesd-Zsóry SE)
—	FW	HUN	Roland Ugrai (from Ferencvárosi TC)
—	FW	ROU	Sasa Popin (to Lombard-Pápa TFC)

Out: Note: Flags indicate national team as defined under FIFA eligibility rules; some limited exceptions apply. Players may hold more than one non-FIFA nationality.

No.	Pos.	Nation	Player
—	GK	ROU	Laurențiu Brănescu (loan return to (Italy) Juventus FC)
—	GK	HUN	László Gyűrű (loan to Soproni VSE)
—	DF	SUI	Arnaud Bühler (to (Switzerland) FC Lausanne-Sport)
—	DF	HUN	Martin Zsirai (loan to FC Ajka)
—	DF	HUN	János Hegedűs (loan to Budaörsi SC)
—	DF	HUN	Máté Czingráber (to Vasas SC)
—	DF	HUN	Péter Grabant (loan to Soproni VSE)
—	DF	HUN	Noel Bedi (loan to Soproni VSE)
—	DF	HUN	Márk Farkas (to Nyíregyháza Spartacus)
—	DF	HUN	Bence Hirschler (loan to Soproni VSE)
—	MF	HUN	Szilárd Devecseri (loan to Mezőkövesd-Zsóry SE)
—	DF	HUN	Máté Katona (loan to Soproni VSE)
—	MF	ITA	Andrea Mancini (to (United States) D.C. United)
—	MF	UKR	Andriy Efremov (to free transfer)
—	MF	HUN	Olivér Nagy (to Szigetszentmiklósi TK)
—	MF	HUN	Kornél Kulcsár (to Várda SE)
—	MF	HUN	Bence Grabant (loan to Soproni VSE)
—	MF	HUN	Barnabás Rácz (loan to Soproni VSE)
—	MF	HUN	András Jancsó (to Soproni VSE)
—	MF	HUN	Martin Tóth (loan to Soproni VSE)
—	MF	HUN	Barnabás Soltész (loan to Soproni VSE)
—	FW	ITA	Tommaso Rocchi (to FC Tatabánya)
—	FW	HUN	András Radó (to Ferencvárosi TC)
—	FW	HUN	Olivér Tihanyi (loan to Soproni VSE)
—	FW	HUN	Máté Dallos (loan to Soproni VSE)

=== Winter ===
In: Note: Flags indicate national team as defined under FIFA eligibility rules; some limited exceptions apply. Players may hold more than one non-FIFA nationality.

No.	Pos.	Nation	Player
—	GK	HUN	László Gyűrű (return loan from Soproni VSE)
—	DF	HUN	Noel Bedi (return loan from Soproni VSE)
—	DF	HUN	Bence Hirschler (return loan from Soproni VSE)
—	DF	HUN	Máté Katona (return loan from Soproni VSE)
—	DF	HUN	Martin Zsirai (return loan from FC Ajka)
—	MF	HUN	Gergely Gyürki (from Pénzügyőr SE)
—	MF	HUN	Barnabás Soltész (return loan from Soproni VSE)
—	MF	HUN	Lóránt Kovács (from (Romania) FC Universitatea Cluj)
—	FW	HUN	Máté Dallos (return loan from Soproni VSE)
—	FW	AUS	David Williams (from (Australia) Melbourne City FC)

Out: Note: Flags indicate national team as defined under FIFA eligibility rules; some limited exceptions apply. Players may hold more than one non-FIFA nationality.

No.	Pos.	Nation	Player
—	GK	HUN	Martin Gyécsek (loan to Sárvár FC)
—	GK	HUN	László Gyűrű (to Petőházi SE)
—	DF	HUN	Noel Bedi (loan to Sárvár FC)
—	DF	HUN	Olivér Lempeg (loan to Sárvár FC)
—	DF	ITA	Raffaele Alcibiade (to (Italy) US Lecce)
—	DF	HUN	Bence Hirschler (to Felsőtárkány SC)
—	DF	HUN	Martin Zsirai (to Mosonmagyaróvári TE)
—	MF	HUN	András Gosztonyi (to (Poland) Śląsk Wrocław)
—	MF	HUN	Barnabás Soltész (to Felsőtárkány SC)
—	FW	HUN	Milán Török (loan to Sárvár FC)
—	FW	HUN	Máté Dallos (to Szekszárdi UFC)

== Nemzeti Bajnokság I ==
=== League table ===
Pos	Team	Pld	W	D	L	GF	GA	GD	Pts	Qualification or relegation
3	Debrecen	33	14	11	8	48	34	+14	53	Qualification for the Europa League first qualifying round (Note: Since the winners of the 2015–16 Magyar Kupa, Ferencváros, qualified for European competition based on league position, the spot awarded to the cup winners (Europa League first qualifying round) was passed to the fourth-placed team.)
4	MTK Budapest	33	14	9	10	39	37	+2	51	Qualification for the Europa League first qualifying round
5	Haladás	33	13	11	9	33	37	−4	50	
6	Újpest	33	11	13	9	42	37	+5	46	
7	Paks	33	12	7	14	41	40	+1	43	

Source: Soccerway
Rules for classification: 1) Points; 2) Matches won; 3) Goal difference; 4) Goals scored; 5) Head-to-head points; 6) Head-to-head goal difference; 7) Head-to-head away goals scored; 8) Fairplay; 9) Draw.

=== Matches ===
19 July 2015 1	Haladás	0 – 2	Ferencváros	Szombathely, Vas County
18:00 CEST		(Report)	Lamah 10'; Šesták 95'	Stadium: Rohonci Street Stadium; Attendance: 4,395; Referee: (Hungary) Viktor Kassai

25 July 2015 2	Videoton	0 – 1	Haladás	Székesfehérvár, Fejér County
18:00 CEST		(Report)	Juhász R. 49' (o.g.)	Stadium: Sóstói Stadion; Attendance: 1,598; Referee: (Hungary) Péter Solymosi

1 August 2015 3	Haladás	2 – 2	MTK	Szombathely, Vas County
18:00 CEST	Ugrai 14'; Jagodics 36'	(Report)	Hrepka 50'; Thiam 93'	Stadium: Rohonci Street Stadium; Attendance: 3,130; Referee: (Hungary) Balázs Berke

9 August 2015 4	Debrecen	0 – 1	Haladás	Debrecen, Hajdú-Bihar County
20:15 CEST		(Report)	Halmosi 53'	Stadium: Nagyerdei Stadion; Attendance: 3,418; Referee: (Hungary) István Vad

15 August 2015 5	Haladás	1 – 0	Paks	Szombathely, Vas County
18:00 CEST	Németh M. 29'	Report		Stadium: Rohonci Street Stadium; Attendance: 3,148; Referee: (Hungary) József Erdős

22 August 2015 6	Újpest	0 – 0	Haladás	Budapest, Pest County
18:00 CEST		(Report)		Stadium: Szusza Ferenc Stadium; Attendance: 3,200; Referee: (Hungary) Sándor Andó-Szabó

29 August 2015 7	Békéscsaba	0 – 1	Haladás	Békéscsaba, Békés County
18:00 CEST		Report	Németh M. 27'	Stadium: Stadion Kórház utcai Attendance: 1,422; Referee: (Hungary) Balázs Berke

12 September 2015 8	Puskás Akadémia	1 – 1	Haladás	Felcsút, Fejér County
18:00 CEST	Pekár 62'	(Report)	Németh M. 28'	Stadium: Pancho Arena; Attendance: 2,225; Referee: (Hungary) István Vad

19 September 2015 9	Haladás	0 – 0	Budapest Honvéd	Szombathely, Vas County
18:00 CEST		(Report)		Stadium: Rohonci Street Stadium; Attendance: 3,439; Referee: (Hungary) Ádám Farkas

26 September 2015 10	Haladás	1 – 1	Vasas	Szombathely, Vas County
18:00 CEST	Gaál B. 52'	(Report)	Kenesei 87' (pen.)	Stadium: Rohonci Street Stadium; Attendance: 4,085; Referee: (Hungary) Péter Solymosi

3 October 2015 11	DVTK	1 – 1	Haladás	Miskolc, Borsod-Abaúj-Zemplén County
18:00 CEST	Novothny 16'	(Report)	Németh M. 26'	Stadium: DVTK Stadion; Attendance: 3,409; Referee: (Hungary) Zoltán Iványi

17 October 2015 12	Ferencváros	3 – 1	Haladás	Budapest, Pest County
20:30 CEST	Šesták 19'; Varga R. 37'; Ramírez 79'	(Report)	Nagy P. 59'	Stadium: Groupama Arena; Attendance: 7,700; Referee: (Hungary) József Erdős

24 October 2015 13	Haladás	1 – 0	Videoton	Szombathely, Vas County
17:30 CEST	Gaál B. 24'	(Report)		Stadium: Stadion Rohonci Út; Attendance: 4,200; Referee: (Hungary) Viktor Kassai

31 October 2015 14	MTK	0 – 1	Haladás	Budapest, Pest County
18:00 CET		(Report)	Gaál B. 75'	Stadium: Stadion Rudolf Illovszky; Attendance: 714; Referee: (Hungary) Zoltán Iványi

2 December 2015 15	Haladás	2 – 2	Debrecen	Szombathely, Vas County
18:30 CET	Martínez 56'; Németh M. 78'	(Report)	Brković 54'; Gaál B. 86' (o.g.)	Stadium: Rohonci úti Stadion; Attendance: 1,866; Referee: (Hungary) József Erdős

21 November 2015 16	Paks	2 – 0	Haladás	Paks, Tolna County
15:30 CET	Lenzsér 49'; Bajner 84'	(Report)		Stadium: Stadion PSE; Attendance: 1,078; Referee: (Hungary) István Vad

28 November 2015 17	Haladás	0 – 3	Újpest	Szombathely, Vas County
15:30 CET		(Report)	Hazard 9'; Litauszki 30'; Diagne 60'	Stadium: Rohonci Street Stadium; Attendance: 2,817; Referee: (Hungary) Péter Solymosi

5 December 2015 18	Haladás	1 – 1	Békéscsaba	Szombathely, Vas County
15:30 CET	Iszlai 73'	(Report)	Calvente 66'	Stadium: Rohonci Street Stadium; Attendance: 2,147; Referee: (Hungary) Ádám Németh

12 December 2015 19	Haladás	2 – 1	Puskás Akadémia	Szombathely, Vas County
15:30 CET	Németh M. 22'; Halmosi 50'	(Report)	Lencse 41'	Stadium: Rohonci Street Stadium; Attendance: 4,280; Referee: (Hungary) Szabolcs Szilasi

13 February 2016 20	Honvéd	0 – 1	Haladás	Budapest, Pest County
15:30 CET		(Report)	S. Wils 44'	Stadium: Bozsik Stadion; Attendance: 1,570; Referee: (Hungary) Sándor Andó-Szabó

20 February 2016 21	Vasas	1 – 0	Haladás	Budapest, Pest County
15:30 CET	Ferenczi I. 82' (pen.)	(Report)		Stadium: Stadion Rudolf Illovszky; Attendance: 2,032; Referee: (Hungary) Ádám Németh

27 February 2015 22	Haladás	2 – 1	DVTK	Sopron, Győr-Moson-Sopron County
15:30 CET	S. Wils 32'; Ugrai 92'	(Report)	Barczi 29' (pen.)	Stadium: Káposztás utcai Stadion; Attendance: 2,127; Referee: (Hungary) József Erdős

5 March 2016 23	Videoton	2 – 1	Haladás	Felcsút, Fejér County
18:00 CEST	Simon Á. 10'; Feczesin 71' (pen.)	(Report)	Popin 65'	Stadium: Pancho Arena; Attendance: 1,298; Referee: (Hungary) István Vad

9 March 2016 24	Haladás	1 – 1	Újpest	Sopron, Győr-Moson-Sopron County
18:00 CET	Williams 11'	(Report)	Lencse 29'	Stadium: Káposztás utcai Stadion; Attendance: 1,728; Referee: (Hungary) Zoltán Iványi

12 March 2016 25	MTK	3 – 1	Haladás	Dunaújváros, Fejér County
15:30 CET	Thiam 16'; Střeštík 59' 77' (pen.)	(Report)	Ugrai 12'	Stadium: Dunaferr Arena; Attendance: 348; Referee: (Hungary) Sándor Andó-Szabó

19 March 2016 26	DVTK	3 – 0	Haladás	Miskolc, Borsod-Abaúj-Zemplén County
15:30 CEST	Elek Á. 12' 72'; Novothny 52'	(Report)		Stadium: DVTK Stadion; Attendance: 3,072; Referee: (Hungary) Ádám Farkas

9 April 2016 27	Haladás	1 – 0	Békéscsaba	Sopron, Győr-Moson-Sopron County
18:00 CEST	Williams 56'	(Report)		Stadium: Káposztás utcai Stadion; Attendance: 1,187; Referee: (Hungary) Ferenc Karakó

2 April 2016 28	Puskás Akadémia	1 – 1	Haladás	Felcsút, Fejér County
18:30 CEST	Márkvárt 13'	(Report)	Gaál B. 34'	Stadium: Pancho Arena; Attendance: 956; Referee: (Hungary) Viktor Kassai

6 April 2016 29	Haladás	2 – 1	Vasas	Sopron, Győr-Moson-Sopron County
19:00 CEST	Németh M. 56'; Gaál B. 63'	(Report)	Müller 37'	Stadium: Káposztás utcai Stadion; Attendance: 1,117; Referee: (Hungary) Péter Solymosi

16 April 2016 30	Honvéd	0 – 1	Haladás	Budapest, Pest County
18:00 CEST		(Report)	Iszlai 65' (pen.)	Stadium: Bozsik Stadion; Attendance: 1,447; Referee: (Hungary) Gergely Szőts

19 April 2016 31	Haladás	2 – 2	Debrecen	Sopron, Győr-Moson-Sopron County
18:00 CEST	Gaál B. 28'; Halmosi 59'	(Report)	Jovanović 51'; Takács T. 66'	Stadium: Káposztás utcai Stadion; Attendance: 1,327; Referee: (Hungary) József Erdős

23 April 2016 32	Paks	2 – 3	Haladás	Paks, Tolna County
18:00 CEST	Gévay 27'; Papp K. 78'	(Report)	T. Wils 73'; Rodenbücher 83' (o.g.); Gaál B. 93'	Stadium: Stadion PSE; Attendance: 1,114; Referee: (Hungary) Ferenc Karakó

30 April 2016 33	Haladás	0 – 1	Ferencváros	Sopron, Győr-Moson-Sopron County
16:30 CEST		(Report)	Kovács L. 31' (o.g.)	Stadium: Káposztás utcai Stadion; Attendance: 4,137; Referee: (Hungary) Sándor Andó-Szabó

== Hungarian Cup ==
12 August 2015 Round 1	Nyúl SC	1 – 3	Haladás	Nyúl, Győr-Moson-Sopron County
18:00 CEST	Rigó 66' (pen.)	Report	Popin 28' 36'; Ugrai 87'	Stadium: Nyúl SC Sporttelep; Attendance: 900; Referee: (Hungary) Miklós Bereczki

23 September 2015 Round 2	Pénzügyőr SE	1 – 3	Haladás	Budapest, Pest County
15:00 CEST	Luczek D. 51'	Report	Iszlai 39' (pen.); Gaál B. 57'; Szőke D. 92'	Stadium: Pénzügyőr SE Sporttelep; Attendance: 400; Referee: (Hungary) József Berger

14 October 2015 Round 3	Somos SE	1 – 3	Haladás	Salgótarján, Nógrád County
14:00 CEST	Novák J. 88'	Report	Gaál B. 2'; Fehér Z. 69'; Nagy P. 85'	Stadium: Szojka Ferenc Stadion; Attendance: 300; Referee: (Hungary) Ferenc Karakó

28 October 2015 Round of 16 (1st leg)	Haladás	0 – 1	Videoton FC	Szombathely, Vas County
18:00 CEST		Report	Kovács I. 54'	Stadium: Rohonci Street Stadium; Attendance: 1,138; Referee: (Hungary) Péter Solymosi

18 November 2015 Round of 16 (2nd leg)	Videoton FC	1 – 1 (2 – 1 agg.)	Haladás	Székesfehérvár, Fejér County
20:15 CET	Feczesin 58'	Report	Ugrai 61'	Stadium: Sóstói Stadion; Attendance: 1,415; Referee: (Hungary) Zsolt Szabó

== Friendly games (2015) ==
26 June 2015	SV Mattersburg (Austria)	3 – 1	Szombathelyi Haladás	Birkfeld, Styria
19:00 CEST (UTC+01)	F. Templ 36' (pen.); Pink 67' 73' (pen.)	(Report)	Halmosi 8'	Attendance: 350; Referee: (Austria) Steindl

28 June 2015	Szombathelyi Haladás	0 – 7	FC Terek Grozny (Russia)	Bad Tatzmannsdorf, Burgenland
17:00 CEST (UTC+01)		(Report)	Mitrishev 23' 25' 31'; Mirzov 48'; Mbengue 51' 65'; Rybus 62'	Attendance: 200; Referee: (Austria)

4 July 2015 Király kupa	Szombathelyi Haladás	0 – 0 (5-4 p)	Diósgyőri VTK	Szombathely, Vas County
14:00 CEST (UTC+01)		(Report)		Stadium: Király Sportlétesítmény; Attendance: 800; Referee: (Hungary) Miklós Tuczai
	Penalties
	Gosztonyi (penalty scored); Jancsó (penalty scored); S. Wils (penalty scored); M. Czingráber (penalty scored); Török M. (penalty scored)		(penalty scored) Egerszegi; (penalty scored) Koman; (penalty scored) Takács T. (penalty scored) Kovács G. (penalty missed) Bognár I.

4 July 2015 Király kupa	Szombathelyi Haladás	0 – 1	Vasas SC	Szombathely, Vas County
19:00 CEST (UTC+01)		(Report)	Novák Cs. 12'	Stadium: Király Sportlétesítmény; Attendance: 800; Referee: (Hungary) Csaba Pintér

7 July 2015	Szombathelyi Haladás	1 – 3	Zalaegerszegi TE	Szombathely, Vas County
18:00 CEST (UTC+01)	Popin 78'	(Report)	Szegleti G. 58'; Horváth R. 60'; Szöllősi F. 78'	Stadium: Rohonci Street Stadium; Attendance: 500; Referee: (Hungary)

10 July 2015	SV Oberwart (Austria)	0 – 3	Szombathelyi Haladás	Oberwart, Burgenland
19:00 CEST (UTC+01)		(Report)	Devecseri 38'; Popin 41'; Medgyes 58'	Attendance: 150; Referee: (Austria)

11 July 2015	Szombathelyi Haladás	1 – 2	Mezőkövesd-Zsóry SE	Szombathely, Vas County
10:00 CEST (UTC+01)	Bosnjak 19'	(Report)	Máté J. 4'; Tajthy 77'	Stadium: Rohonci Street Stadium; Attendance: 500; Referee: (Hungary) Balázs Huszár

22 July 2015	Szombathelyi Haladás	2 – 1	BFC Siófok	Szombathely, Vas County
10:00 CEST (UTC+01)	Medgyes 42'; Németh M. 47'	(Report)	Nagy J. 39' (pen.)	Stadium: Rohonci Street Stadium; Attendance: 100; Referee: (Hungary)

3 September 2015	Szombathelyi Haladás	3 – 3	Soproni VSE	Szombathely, Vas County
16:30 CEST (UTC+01)	Popin 22'; Petró 30'; Gosztonyi 71'	(Report)	Szabó L. 23'; Holdampf G. 36'; Zamostny 68' (pen.)	Stadium: Rohonci Street Stadium; Attendance: 300; Referee: (Hungary) Csaba Pintér

7 October 2015	FC Ajka	3 – 2	Szombathelyi Haladás	Ajka, Veszprém County
18:00 CEST (UTC+01)	Zsirai 12'; Major N. 22' (pen.); Sándor I. 47'	(Report)	Popin 49' (pen.) 52'	Stadium: Ajkai Városi Szabadidő- és Sportcentrum; Attendance: 300; Referee: (Hungary) Szabolcs Szilasi

9 October 2015	Sturm Graz (Austria)	2 – 0	Szombathelyi Haladás	Graz, Austria
15:00 CEST (UTC+01)	Schick 18'; Edomwonyi 47'	(Report)		Stadium: Trainingszentrum Messendorf; Attendance: 300; Referee: (Austria) Kolleger

13 November 2015	Soproni VSE	1 – 2	Szombathelyi Haladás	Sopron, Győr-Moson-Sopron County
11:00 CET (UTC+01)	Batizi-Pócsi B. 78'	(Report)	Gaál B. 8'; Martínez 39'	Stadium: Káposztás utcai Stadion; Attendance: 100; Referee: (Hungary) Kovács G.

== Friendly games (2016) ==
16 January 2016	NK Ankaran (Slovenia)	0 – 2	Szombathelyi Haladás	Ankaran, Slovene Littoral
14:00 CET (UTC+01)		(Report)	Popin 48' 60'	Attendance: 30; Referee: (Slovenia) Antic

20 January 2016	Szombathelyi Haladás	6 – 1	FC Ajka	Szombathely, Vas County
14:30 CET (UTC+01)	Iszlai 14' (pen.); Németh M. 29'; Kaufmann 48'; Ugrai 68'; Petró 80'	(Report)	Olasz D. 60'	Stadium: Illés Akadémia; Attendance: 50; Referee: (Hungary) Bálint Juhász

24 January 2016	Szombathelyi Haladás	0 – 2	Zagłębie Lubin (Poland)	Belek, Turkey
16:00 CET (UTC+01)		(Report)	Papadopulos 37'; Woźniak 45'	Attendance: 50; Referee: (Turkey)

27 January 2016	Szombathelyi Haladás	1 – 0	FC Voluntari (Romania)	Belek, Turkey
14:30 CET (UTC+01)	Gaál B. 48'	(Report)		Referee: (Turkey)

29 January 2016	Szombathelyi Haladás	3 – 4	LASK Linz (Austria)	Belek, Turkey
13:00 CET (UTC+01)	Williams 3'; Gaál B. 8'; Ugrai 56'	(Report)	P. Michorl 23'; R. Ranftl 35'; Hinum 46'; Fröschl 60'	Referee: (Turkey)

6 February 2016	Szombathelyi Haladás	2 – 2	FC Ajka	Bük, Vas County
10:00 CET (UTC+01)	T. Wils 10'; Ugrai 90'	(Report)	Kollega K. 44' 58'	Stadium: Sportcentrum Bük; Referee: (Hungary) Ákos Gaál

26 March 2015	Soproni VSE	0 – 1	Szombathelyi Haladás	Sopron, Győr-Moson-Sopron County
11:00 CET (UTC+01)		(Report)	Iszlai 78' (pen.)	Stadium: Káposztás utcai Stadion; Attendance: 150; Referee: (Hungary) Pintér
