= 2016–17 BFC Siófok season =

Siófok
2016–17 season
- Owner: Tamás György
- Manager: Goran Kopunović (until 10 February 2017); László Disztl (from 10 February)
- Stadium: Révész Géza utcai Stadion
- Nemzeti Bajnokság II: 14th
- Magyar Kupa: Round of 128
- Top goalscorer: League: Márk Petneházi (12); All: Márk Petneházi (12)
- Highest home attendance: 800 v Puskás Akadémia (30 April 2017, Nemzeti Bajnokság II)
- Lowest home attendance: 100 v Sopron (7 May 2017, Nemzeti Bajnokság II)
- Average home league attendance: 298
- Biggest win: 5–0 v SZEOL (Away, 20 November 2016, Nemzeti Bajnokság II)
- Biggest defeat: 1–6 v Soroksár (Away, 25 September 2016, Nemzeti Bajnokság II)

The 2016–17 season was Bodajk Football Club Siófok's 4th consecutive season in the Nemzeti Bajnokság II and 86th year in existence as a football club. In addition to the domestic league, Siófok participated in that season's editions of the Magyar Kupa.

== Squad ==
Squad at end of season

Note: Flags indicate national team as defined under FIFA eligibility rules; some limited exceptions apply. Players may hold more than one non-FIFA nationality.

No.	Pos.	Nation	Player
1	GK	HUN	Norbert Tajti
2	DF	HUN	József Mogyorósi
3	DF	HUN	Ádám Tamaskó
4	DF	HUN	Máté Czingráber
5	MF	HUN	Zsombor Futó
6	N/A	HUN	Kevin Körmendy
7	MF	HUN	Dániel Nagy
9	FW	HUN	Péter Berki
10	FW	HUN	Bence Elek
12	MF	HUN	Péter Czvitkovics
14	DF	HUN	Zoltán Szilágyi
15	MF	HUN	Márk Petneházi
16	GK	HUN	Bálint Filipánics

No.	Pos.	Nation	Player
18	FW	HUN	Alexander Pendl
19	FW	HUN	Gábor Gréczi
21	MF	HUN	Norbert Farkas
22	MF	HUN	Richárd Kozma
23	DF	HUN	Vilmos Szalai
26	GK	HUN	Tamás Kis
27	MF	HUN	István Berde
28	MF	HUN	Miklós Micsinai
55	MF	HUN	Mátyás Gál
73	FW	HUN	Dávid Kovács
77	MF	HUN	Zsolt Lázár
97	MF	HUN	Richárd Nagy
—	MF	HUN	Jérémy Tóth

== Transfers ==
=== Transfers in ===
Transfer window	Pos.	No.	Player	From
Summer	GK	1	(Hungary) Norbert Tajti	(Hungary) Felsőtárkány
Summer	DF	3	(Hungary) Ádám Tamaskó	(Hungary) Dunaújváros
Summer	MF	15	(Hungary) Márk Petneházi	(Hungary) Ajka
Summer	FW	18	(Hungary) Alexander Pendl	(Cyprus) Nikos & Sokratis Erimis
Summer	DF	23	(Hungary) Vilmos Szalai	Free agent (Note: Previous club Nyíregyháza.)
Summer	MF	27	(Hungary) István Berde	(Hungary) Szeged
Winter	MF	–	(Hungary) Jérémy Tóth	Free agent (Note: Previous club Sopron.)
Winter	MF	12	(Hungary) Péter Czvitkovics	Free agent (Note: Previous club Vasas.)

=== Transfers out ===
Transfer window	Pos.	No.	Player	To
Summer	MF	23	(Hungary) Gellért Ivancsics	Released (Note: Joined Szeged.)

=== Loans in ===
Transfer window	Pos.	No.	Player	From	End date
Summer	DF	14	(Hungary) Zoltán Szilágyi	(Hungary) Vasas Kubala Akadémia	End of season
Summer	FW	73	(Hungary) Dávid Kovács	(Hungary) Vasas Kubala Akadémia	End of season
Winter	MF	77	(Hungary) Zsolt Lázár	(Hungary) Győr	End of season

=== Loans out ===
Transfer window	Pos.	No.	Player	To	End date

== Pre-season and friendlies ==
Friendly	Apollon Limassol (Cyprus)	2–2	(Hungary) Siófok
	Lopes; Alex	Report	R. Nagy II 2x

Friendly	MTK	2–2	Siófok
	Torghelle 2x	Report	Petneházi; Kozma

Friendly	Újpest	1–1	Siófok
	Diarra	Report	Elek

15 January 2017 Friendly	Dunaújváros	–	Siófok	Dunaújváros
Note: The match was called off due to unplayable pitch conditions caused by adverse weather, following agreement between the two clubs and the match officials to prevent injuries.

18 January 2017 Friendly	Paks	1–0	Siófok	Szekszárd
	Hajdú 85'	Report

21 January 2017 Friendly	Rákospalota	1–3	Siófok	Budapest
	T. Kiss	Report	Elek; Gál; Gréczi	Stadium: Szántóföld Sportcentrum

25 January 2017 Friendly	Vác	1–0	Siófok	Budapest
	Dlusztus	Report		Stadium: Promontor utcai Stadion

28 January 2017 Friendly	Siófok (Hungary)	2–1	(Slovakia) Zlaté Moravce	Budapest, Hungary
	Gréczi (pen.); Berki 83'	Report	Nurković	Stadium: Promontor utcai Stadion

1 February 2017 Friendly	Siófok	4–0	Szigetszentmiklós	Siófok
	Berki; Gréczi (pen.); Petneházi; Micsinai	Report

5 February 2017 Friendly	Siófok (Hungary)	3–4	(Croatia) Slaven Belupo	Hévíz, Hungary
	Berki 10'; Petneházi 51' (pen.); Berde 68'; N. Farkas (penalty missed) 84'	Report	Radić 34', 42', 51'; Bistrović 49'	Referee: Szabolcs Szilasi (Hungary)

11 February 2017 Friendly	Kaposvár	2–5	Siófok	Kaposvár
	Mayer 23' (pen.); Kertész 90'	Report	Gréczi 3'; Lázár 11'; D. Nagy 56'; Dáv. Kovács 78'; Elek 85'	Stadium: Bene Ferenc Labdarúgó Akadémia

== Competitions ==
=== Overview ===
Competition	First match	Last match	Starting round	Final position	Record							
Competition	First match	Last match	Starting round	Final position	Pld	W	D	L	GF	GA	GD	Win %
Nemzeti Bajnokság II	31 July 2016	4 June 2017	Matchday 1	14th	38	13	9	16	43	51	−8	34.21
Magyar Kupa	21 September 2016	21 September 2016	Round of 128	Round of 128	1	0	0	1	0	2	−2	0.00
Total					39	13	9	17	43	53	−10	33.33

Source: Competitions

=== Nemzeti Bajnokság II ===
==== League table ====
Pos	Team	Pld	W	D	L	GF	GA	GD	Pts
12	Nyíregyháza	38	14	8	16	48	50	−2	50
13	Sopron	38	11	16	11	37	38	−1	49
14	Siófok	38	13	9	16	43	51	−8	48
15	Budaörs	38	13	8	17	48	56	−8	47
16	Csákvár	38	8	16	14	44	57	−13	40

Source: (in Hungarian)
Rules for classification: 1st points; 2nd overall wins; 3rd goal difference; 4th head-to-head points; 5th head-to-head goal difference; 6th head-to-head away goals scored; 7th fair-play points; 8th drawing of lots

==== Results summary ====
Overall								Home						Away					
Pld	W	D	L	GF	GA	GD	Pts	W	D	L	GF	GA	GD	W	D	L	GF	GA	GD
38	13	9	16	43	51	−8	48	8	5	6	27	24	+3	5	4	10	16	27	−11

Source: Hungarian Football Federation

==== Results by round ====
Round	1	2	3	4	5	6	7	8	9	10	11	12	13	14	15	16	17	18	19	20	21	22	23	24	25	26	27	28	29	30	31	32	33	34	35	36	37	38
Ground	H	A	H	H	A	H	A	H	A	H	A	H	A	H	A	H	A	H	A	A	H	A	A	H	A	H	A	H	A	H	A	H	A	H	A	H	A	H
Result	W	L	W	W	L	L	L	W	W	W	L	L	L	D	D	L	W	L	L	L	D	W	L	L	D	D	D	W	W	W	W	L	L	D	L	W	D	D
Position	6	13	6	3	6	10	15	6	5	3	7	9	10	11	12	15	11	13	14	14	15	13	13	14	15	15	15	14	12	12	11	12	13	13	15	14	15	14
Points	3	3	6	9	9	9	9	12	15	18	18	18	18	19	20	20	23	23	23	23	24	27	27	27	28	29	30	33	36	39	42	42	42	43	43	46	47	48

Source: Matches
A = Away; H = Home; W = Win; D = Draw; L = Loss

==== Matches ====
31 July 2016 1	Siófok	1–0	Vác	Siófok
19:00 CEST (UTC+2)	N. Farkas (yellow card) 41'; Futó (yellow card) 49'; Petneházi (yellow card) 73'; Gréczi (yellow card) 81', (goal) 90+1'	Report	Földi (yellow card) 22'; Kákonyi (yellow card) 85'	Stadium: Révész Géza utcai Stadion; Attendance: 350; Referee: Dr. Gergely Kovács; Assistant referees: József Aradi, Tamás Kulman; Fourth official: Ákos Gaál

7 August 2016 2	Zalaegerszeg	4–1	Siófok	Zalaegerszeg
19:00 CEST (UTC+2)	Daru 7'; Deutsch 23'; Gottfried 42'; Forgács 67'	Report	Gréczi 35'; Futó (red card) 37'; Szalai (yellow card) 43'	Stadium: ZTE Arena; Attendance: 1,115; Referee: Ádám Radványi; Assistant referees: Gergő Vígh-Tarsonyi, Gábor Kovács II; Fourth official: Bálint Dolnegó

10 August 2016 3	Siófok	2–1	Mosonmagyaróvár	Siófok
19:00 CEST (UTC+2)	Czingráber (yellow card) 14'; Elek 17', 62'; Petneházi (yellow card) 39'; Gréczi (yellow card) 85'; Tamaskó (yellow card) 87'	Report	Darázs (yellow card) 30'; Magasföldi 36'; Bohner (yellow card) 37'	Stadium: Révész Géza utcai Stadion; Attendance: 180; Referee: Péter Zierkelbach; Assistant referees: Theodoros Georgiou, István Iványi; Fourth official: Attila Szommer

14 August 2016 4	Siófok	4–1	Kozármisleny	Siófok
19:00 CEST (UTC+2)	N. Farkas (yellow card) 23', (goal) 55'; Elek 49', (yellow card) 73'; Gál (yellow card) 56'; Berki 67', 88'; D. Nagy (yellow card) 71'; Gréczi (yellow card) 73'	Report	Beke 24'; A. Tóth (yellow card) 28'; Gubacsi (yellow card) 61'	Stadium: Révész Géza utcai Stadion; Attendance: 350; Referee: J. Zoltán Kovács; Assistant referees: Oszkár Lémon, Milán Mohos; Fourth official: László Szalai

21 August 2016 5	Nyíregyháza	1–0	Siófok	Nyíregyháza
17:30 CEST (UTC+2)	Harsányi 28'; Tamási (yellow card) 36'; Ur (yellow card) 78'	Report	Szalai (yellow card) 26'; Elek (yellow card) 33'; Gréczi (yellow card) 51'	Stadium: Városi Stadion; Attendance: 1,900; Referee: László Lovas; Assistant referees: Gyula Punyi, Tibor Csatári; Fourth official: Tamás Takács

24 August 2016 6	Siófok	0–2	Dorog	Siófok
19:00 CEST (UTC+2)	Berde (yellow card) 26'; Futó (yellow card) 81'	Report	Á. Mészáros (yellow card) 6'; Perović 42' (pen.); M. Tóth 59'; Szemerédi (yellow card) 63'; Medgyes (yellow card) 79'	Stadium: Révész Géza utcai Stadion; Attendance: 400; Referee: Balázs Berke; Assistant referees: Attila Kelemen, Balázs Szert; Fourth official: Tibor Gyarmati II

28 August 2016 7	Szeged	1–0	Siófok	Gyula
17:30 CEST (UTC+2)	M. Mészáros (yellow card) 45'; Király (yellow card) 54'; Zádori 83'; Germán (yellow card) 90+3'	Report	N. Farkas (yellow card) 56'	Stadium: Grosics Gyula Labdarúgó Akadémia; Attendance: 300; Referee: Gergő Bogár; Assistant referees: István Albert, Gergő Vígh-Tarsonyi; Fourth official: Attila Bálint

11 September 2016 8	Siófok	4–2	Cegléd	Siófok
15:00 CEST (UTC+2)	Kozma 23'; N. Farkas (yellow card) 49'; G. Horváth 52' (o.g.); Gréczi (yellow card) 58'; Futó 68'; Nánási 86' (o.g.)	Report	Makrai 40'; Csordás 48'; Popovics (yellow card) 74'; Peres (yellow card) 77'	Stadium: Révész Géza utcai Stadion; Attendance: 300; Referee: Tamás Berényi; Assistant referees: József Aradi, Zoltán Kis; Fourth official: Ádám Leél-Őssy

14 September 2016 9	Balmazújváros	0–1	Siófok	Balmazújváros
18:00 CEST (UTC+2)	Hadházi (yellow card) 33'	Report	Czingráber (yellow card) 60'; Kozma 65'	Stadium: Városi Sportpálya; Attendance: 600; Referee: Gergely Szőts; Assistant referees: Gábor Erős, Dániel Szaéai; Fourth official: Bálint Dolnegó

18 September 2016 10	Siófok	2–0	Budaörs	Siófok
18:00 CEST (UTC+2)	Petneházi 15' (pen.), (yellow card) 32'; Kozma 67'; Szalai (yellow card) 79'	Report	Ordasi (yellow card) 14'; Ferkó (yellow card) 32'; Kinyik (yellow card) 89'	Stadium: Révész Géza utcai Stadion; Attendance: 400; Referee: Ákos Gaál; Assistant referees: Balázs Huszár, Péter Kóbor; Fourth official: Dr. Gergely Kovács

25 September 2016 11	Soroksár	6–1	Siófok	Budapest
16:00 CEST (UTC+2)	Gengeliczki (yellow card) 10', (goal) 56'; Lovrencsics 13', 27'; Gyepes 37'; Sándor (yellow card) 62', (goal) 90+2'; P. Szilágyi 82'	Report	Gréczi 29'; Szalai (red card) 53'	Stadium: Szamosi Mihály Sporttelep; Attendance: 400; Referee: Attila Molnár; Assistant referees: Zoltán Horváth, Dávid Bertalan; Fourth official: Balázs Böcskei

2 October 2016 12	Siófok	0–1	Szolnok	Siófok
17:00 CEST (UTC+2)	Czingráber (yellow card) 34'	Report	Papp 31'; Csirmaz (yellow card) 80'	Stadium: Révész Géza utcai Stadion; Attendance: 350; Referee: Ádám Farkas; Assistant referees: Attila Kelemen, Balázs Szert; Fourth official: László Mencsik

16 October 2016 13	Puskás Akadémia	1–0	Siófok	Felcsút
17:00 CEST (UTC+2)	Vanczák (yellow card) 14', (goal) 36'; Márkvárt (yellow card) 44'; Fényes (yellow card) 72'; Hegedűs (yellow card) 82'; Heffler (yellow card) 90+1'	Report	Petneházi (yellow card) 34'; Czingráber (yellow card) 85'; Berde (yellow card) 90'; N. Farkas (yellow card) 90+2'	Stadium: Pancho Aréna; Attendance: 671; Referee: Péter Zierkelbach; Assistant referees: Arnold Kepe, Tamás Kulman; Fourth official: Ádám Leél-Őssy

22 October 2016 14	Siófok	0–0	Kisvárda	Siófok
14:30 CEST (UTC+2)	Szilágyi (yellow card) 62'; Czingráber (yellow card) 66'; Petneházi (yellow card) 69'	Report	Vári (yellow card) 38'; Papucsek (yellow card) 56'; G. Oláh (yellow card) 69'	Stadium: Révész Géza utcai Stadion; Attendance: 250; Referee: J. Zoltán Kovács; Assistant referees: Gábor Takács, József Aradi; Fourth official: Ádám Radványi

30 October 2016 15	Sopron	1–1	Siófok	Sopron
17:00 CET (UTC+1)	G. Kovács 26'; Popin (yellow card) 89'	Report	Gál 11'; Elek (yellow card) 33'; N. Farkas (yellow card) 63'; Szalai (red card) 89'	Stadium: Káposztás utcai Stadion; Attendance: 400; Referee: Gergő Bogár; Assistant referees: László Viszokai, Milán Mohos; Fourth official: Tibor Farkas

6 November 2016 16	Siófok	0–2	Békéscsaba	Siófok
13:30 CET (UTC+1)		Report	I. Nagy 25', 59'	Stadium: Révész Géza utcai Stadion; Attendance: 200; Referee: Gergely Szőts; Assistant referees: Oszkár Lémon, Krisztián Király; Fourth official: Balázs Böcskei

20 November 2016 17	SZEOL	0–5	Siófok	Szeged
13:00 CET (UTC+1)	Péter (yellow card) 17'; Ikonomou (yellow card) 19'; Vágó (yellow card) 23'; Gajág (yellow card) 38'	Report	Czingráber (yellow card) 9'; Petneházi 34' (pen.), 55', 59', 76' (pen.); N. Farkas (yellow card) 35'; Gréczi 40'; Szilágyi (yellow card) 90'	Stadium: Szegedi Vasutas SE Sporttelep; Attendance: 300; Referee: Gábor Oláh; Assistant referees: Péter Garai, Norbert Bornemissza; Fourth official: Árpád Jakab

27 November 2016 18	Siófok	0–2	Cigánd	Siófok
13:00 CET (UTC+1)	N. Farkas (yellow card) 25'; D. Nagy (yellow card) 65'; Kozma (yellow card) 67'; Elek (yellow card) 75'; Mogyorósi (yellow card) 89'	Report	Balogh 22', (yellow card) 80'; Katona 28'; Oltean (yellow card) 54'; Roszel (yellow card) 89'	Stadium: Révész Géza utcai Stadion; Attendance: 200; Referee: József Ducsai; Assistant referees: Arnold Kepe, Gergő Vígh-Tarsonyi; Fourth official: Tibor Gyarmati II

4 December 2016 19	Csákvár	3–0	Siófok	Csákvár
15:00 CET (UTC+1)	Paudits 20' (pen.), 31' (pen.); Pintér (yellow card) 45'; Lőrincz 52'	Report	Szalai (yellow card) 28'; Kozma (yellow card) 61'; N. Farkas (yellow card) 63'; Elek (yellow card) 67'; Czingráber (yellow card) 75'	Stadium: Tersztyánszky Ödön Sportközpont; Attendance: 300; Referee: János Takács; Assistant referees: Zoltán Horváth, Norert Szilágyi; Fourth official: Norbert Nagy

11 December 2016 20	Vác	1–0	Siófok	Dunaújváros (Note: The match was played at the Dunaújvárosi Stadion in Dunaújváros, instead of Vác regular stadium, the Ligeti Stadion in Vác.)
13:00 CET (UTC+1)	Balajti 25' (pen.)	Report	Gál (yellow card) 24'; Petneházi (red card) 83'; N. Farkas (yellow card) 89'	Stadium: Dunaújvárosi Stadion; Attendance: 100; Referee: Róbert Nagy; Assistant referees: Gyula Punyi, Roland Galán; Fourth official: Balázs Böcskei

19 February 2017 21	Siófok	1–1	Zalaegerszeg	Siófok
14:00 CET (UTC+1)	Elek 1'; Berki (yellow card) 87'; Szalai (yellow card) 90'	Report	Babati (yellow card) 15'; Forgács (yellow card) 78'; Bobál 89'	Stadium: Révész Géza utcai Stadion; Attendance: 400; Referee: Ákos Gaál; Assistant referees: Roland Hofbauer, Dávid Bertalan; Fourth official: Dr. Gergely Kovács

26 February 2017 22	Mosonmagyaróvár	1–2	Siófok	Mosonmagyaróvár
14:00 CET (UTC+1)	Lázár 55'; Zsirai (not on pitch) (yellow card) 57'; Schmatovich (yellow card) 75'	Report	Petneházi 27' (pen.); D. Nagy 52', (yellow card) 61'	Stadium: Wittmann Antal park Attendance: 800; Referee: Ádám Radványi; Assistant referees: Tamás Kulman, Zsolt Király; Fourth official: Árpád Jakab

5 March 2017 23	Kozármisleny	1–0	Siófok	Pécs (Note: The match was played at the Stadion PMFC in Pécs, instead of Kozármisleny regular stadium, the Alkotmány tér in Kozármisleny, which was demolished to make way to the newly built Kozármislenyi Stadion.)
14:30 CET (UTC+1)	E. Nagy (yellow card) 43'; Varga 57'; Kirchner (yellow card) 76'; D. Horváth (yellow card) 88'	Report	Elek (yellow card) 58'; Czingráber (yellow card) 65'	Stadium: Stadion PMFC; Attendance: 200; Referee: Bálint Dolnegó; Assistant referees: Gergő Vígh-Tarsonyi, Tibor Gyarmati II; Fourth official: Gergő Bogár

12 March 2017 24	Siófok	0–1	Nyíregyháza	Siófok
12:30 CET (UTC+1)	N. Farkas (yellow card) 6'; Czingráber (yellow card) 25'; Elek (yellow card) 56'; Mogyorósi (yellow card) 63'	Report	Kónya (yellow card) 29'; Rudolf (yellow card) 40'; Kártik 50'; Törtei (yellow card) 83'; Holdampf (yellow card) 86'	Stadium: Révész Géza utcai Stadion; Attendance: 200; Referee: Péter Zierkelbach; Assistant referees: Dániel Szalai, József Aradi; Fourth official: Ádám Radványi

16 March 2017 25	Dorog	0–0	Siófok	Dorog
15:00 CET (UTC+1)	M. Tóth (yellow card) 68'; Lénárth (yellow card) 74'; Sitku (yellow card) 75'; Bor (yellow card) 84'	Report	Tamaskó (yellow card) 58'; N. Farkas (yellow card) 63'; Lázár (yellow card) 82'	Stadium: Buzánszky Jenő Stadion; Attendance: 350; Referee: Gábor Oláh; Assistant referees: László Viszokai, Gergely Becséri; Fourth official: Attila Molnár

19 March 2017 26	Siófok	1–1	Szeged	Siófok
15:00 CET (UTC+1)	D. Nagy 8'; Mogyorósi (red card) 78'	Report	Achim (yellow card) 58'; Geiger (yellow card) 63' (red card) 63'; Germán 86' (pen.), (yellow card) 90+2'; Király (yellow card) 90'	Stadium: Révész Géza utcai Stadion; Attendance: 300; Referee: Gergő Bogár; Assistant referees: Zoltán Pápai, Gergő Vígh-Tarsonyi; Fourth official: Balázs Böcskei

2 April 2017 27	Cegléd	1–1	Siófok	Albertirsa (Note: Cegléd played the 2016–17 season at the Ecsedi László Sportcentrum in Albertirsa, instead of their regular stadium, the Malomtó széli stadion in Cegléd, which did not meet the competition requirements in the Nemzeti Bajnokság II.)
16:30 CEST (UTC+2)	S. Nagy (yellow card) 67'; Szabó 90+3'	Report	Dáv. Kovács 44', (yellow card) 79'; Kozma (yellow card) 52'; N. Farkas (red card) 73'; D. Nagy (yellow card) 81'; Elek (yellow card) 90+3'	Stadium: Ecsedi László Sportcentrum; Attendance: 500; Referee: Sándor Szilágyi; Assistant referees: Péter Garai, Norbert Bornemisza; Fourth official: Dr. Bence Csonka

9 April 2017 28	Siófok	2–1	Balmazújváros	Siófok
16:30 CEST (UTC+2)	D. Nagy 59'; Elek (yellow card) 77', (goal) 84'; Lázár (yellow card) 90+2'	Report	Bakos (yellow card) 48'; K. Kapacina 90'; Vachtler (yellow card) 90+1'	Stadium: Révész Géza utcai Stadion; Attendance: 300; Referee: Ákos Gaál; Assistant referees: Péter Kóbor, Balázs Huszár; Fourth official: Ádám Radványi

12 April 2017 29	Budaörs	0–2	Siófok	Tatabánya (Note: The match was played at the Városi Stadion in Tatabánya, instead of Budaörs regular stadium, the Árok utca in Budaörs, which was demolished to make way to the newly built Budaörsi Stadion.)
16:30 CEST (UTC+2)	L. Horváth (yellow card) 90+2'	Report	Petneházi 56'; Gréczi 89'	Stadium: Városi Stadion; Attendance: 50; Referee: Dr. Bence Csonka; Assistant referees: Zoltán Horváth, Tibor Csatári; Fourth official: Tamás Takács

16 April 2017 30	Siófok	3–2	Soroksár	Siófok
16:30 CEST (UTC+2)	Petneházi 6'; Elek 59'; D. Nagy 66'; Berki (yellow card) 90+3'	Report	Lovrencsics 12', 84'	Stadium: Révész Géza utcai Stadion; Attendance: 300; Referee: Szabolcs Szilasi; Assistant referees: Zoltán Kis, Milán Mohos; Fourth official: Dr. Gergely Kovács

23 April 2017 31	Szolnok	0–1	Siófok	Szolnok
16:00 CEST (UTC+2)	Csirmaz (yellow card) 59'; Papp (yellow card) 72'	Report	Petneházi 21'; N. Farkas (yellow card) 82'	Stadium: Tiszaligeti Stadion; Attendance: 700; Referee: Tamás Nazsa; Assistant referees: Róbert Horváth, Ákos Berényi; Fourth official: Dr. Bence Csonka

30 April 2017 32	Siófok	1–2	Puskás Akadémia	Siófok
19:00 CEST (UTC+2)	N. Farkas 18', (red card) 90+1'; Gál (yellow card) 74'	Report	Vanczák 49'; Zsidai (yellow card) 59'; Márkvárt 65', (yellow card) 83'; Prosser (yellow card) 70'; Sándor (yellow card) 90'	Stadium: Révész Géza utcai Stadion; Attendance: 800; Referee: Péter Solymosi; Assistant referees: Zoltán Pápai, Gábor Kovács II; Fourth official: Gergő Bogár

3 May 2017 33	Kisvárda	2–0	Siófok	Kisvárda
17:30 CEST (UTC+2)	Gosztonyi 6' (pen.); Lucas 35'; Izing (yellow card) 56'	Report	Berde (yellow card) 5'	Stadium: Várkert Sportpálya; Attendance: 800; Referee: József Erdős; Assistant referees: Gábor Varga Jr., Balázs Szert; Fourth official: Ádám Radványi

7 May 2017 34	Siófok	1–1	Sopron	Siófok
18:00 CEST (UTC+2)	Gál 40'; Tamaskó (yellow card) 85'	Report	Fazakas (yellow card) 66'; Szilágyi 76' (o.g.); Kapacina (yellow card) 81'	Stadium: Révész Géza utcai Stadion; Attendance: 100; Referee: J. Zoltán Kovács; Assistant referees: Arnold Kepe, József Aradi; Fourth official: Tamás Berényi

14 May 2017 35	Békéscsaba	3–0	Siófok	Békéscsaba
17:30 CEST (UTC+2)	Birtalan (yellow card) 24', (goal) 77'; Pilán 61'; Viczián (yellow card) 72'; Kelemen 83'; Guarú (yellow card) 87'	Report	Lázár (yellow card) 75'	Stadium: Kórház utcai Stadion; Attendance: 951; Referee: Ádám Németh; Assistant referees: Gergő Vígh-Tarsonyi, Zoltán Pápai; Fourth official: Gábor Oláh

21 May 2017 36	Siófok	2–1	SZEOL	Siófok
18:00 CEST (UTC+2)	Petneházi 5'; Elek 27'; N. Farkas (yellow card) 45'; Mogyorósi (yellow card) 87'; Szilágyi (yellow card) 87'; Micsinai (yellow card) 90+4'	Report	Búrány (yellow card) 56'; Vágó (yellow card) 72'; Beretka 83'; R. Nagy I (yellow card) 90'	Stadium: Révész Géza utcai Stadion; Attendance: 300; Referee: Bálint Dolnegó; Assistant referees: Isván Iványi, Milán Mohos; Fourth official: Ádám Radványi

28 May 2017 37	Cigánd	1–1	Siófok	Cigánd
18:00 CEST (UTC+2)	Angyal 81'; L. Oláh (yellow card) 82'	Report	D. Nagy (yellow card) 78'; Gál 83'	Stadium: Városi Stadion; Attendance: 200; Referee: Balázs Böcskei; Assistant referees: Roland Hofbauer, Norbert Szilágyi; Fourth official: Mátyás Farkas

4 June 2017 38	Siófok	3–3	Csákvár	Siófok
18:00 CEST (UTC+2)	Berde 2'; Tajti (yellow card) 20'; Petneházi 55' (pen.), 87' (pen.); Elek (yellow card) 90+4'	Report	C. Molnár (yellow card) 5'; Fényes 31', (yellow card) 90+3'; T. Molnár 33'; Bakos (yellow card) 36'; D. Mészáros (yellow card) 60'; Kiprich (yellow card) 73', (goal) 90+1'; Kékesi (yellow card) 90+3'; Dán. Kovács (yellow card) 90+4'	Stadium: Révész Géza utcai Stadion; Attendance: 300; Referee: Ferenc Karakó; Assistant referees: Gyula Punyi, Norbert Szilágyi; Fourth official: Róbert Nagy

=== Magyar Kupa ===
21 September 2016 Round of 128	Rákospalota	2–0	Siófok	Budapest
17:00 CEST (UTC+2)	Pesti (yellow card) 41'; Dán. Kovács 52'; Kiss 71'; Pataki (yellow card) 81'; Balázs (yellow card) 84'; G. Nagy (yellow card) 87'	Report	Körmendy (red card) 90'; R. Nagy II (yellow card) 90+4'	Stadium: Budai II. László Stadion; Referee: Péter Antal; Assistant referees: Norbert Bornemissza, Mátyás Tamás Mohos

== Statistics ==
=== Overall ===
Appearances (Apps) numbers are for appearances in competitive games only, including sub appearances.
Source: Competitions

No.	Player	Pos.	Nemzeti Bajnokság II				Magyar Kupa				Total			
No.	Player	Pos.	Apps	Goal	Booked	Sent off (straight red)	Apps	Goal	Booked	Sent off (straight red)	Apps	Goal	Booked	Sent off (straight red)
1	(Hungary) Norbert Tajti	GK	34		1						34		1	
2	(Hungary) József Mogyorósi	DF	19		3	1	1				20		3	1
3	(Hungary) Ádám Tamaskó	DF	30		3		1				31		3	
4	(Hungary) Máté Czingráber	DF	36		9						36		9	
5	(Hungary) Zsombor Futó	MF	6	1	2	1					6	1	2	1
6	(Hungary) Kevin Körmendy	N/A					1			1	1			1
7	(Hungary) Dániel Nagy	MF	31	4	5		1				32	4	5	
8	(Hungary) János Nagy	DF	3								3			
9	(Hungary) Péter Berki	FW	32	2	2		1				33	2	2	
10	(Hungary) Bence Elek	FW	36	7	10		1				37	7	10	
12	(Hungary) Péter Czvitkovics	MF	12								12			
14	(Hungary) Zoltán Szilágyi	DF	12		3		1				13		3	
15	(Hungary) Márk Petneházi	MF	31	12	5	1					31	12	5	1
16	(Hungary) Bálint Filipánics	GK	4				1				5			
18	(Hungary) Alexander Pendl	FW	5				1				6			
19	(Hungary) Gábor Gréczi	FW	29	5	5		1				30	5	5	
21	(Hungary) Norbert Farkas	MF	32	2	14	2					32	2	14	2
22	(Hungary) Richárd Kozma	MF	27	3	3						27	3	3	
23	(Hungary) Vilmos Szalai	DF	20		5	2					20		5	2
26	(Hungary) Tamás Kis	GK												
27	(Hungary) István Berde	MF	28	1	3		1				29	1	3	
28	(Hungary) Miklós Micsinai	MF	2		1		1				3		1	
55	(Hungary) Mátyás Gál	MF	35	3	3						35	3	3	
73	(Hungary) Dávid Kovács	FW	24	1	1		1				25	1	1	
77	(Hungary) Zsolt Lázár	MF	16		3						16		3	
97	(Hungary) Richárd Nagy	MF	11				1		1		12		1	
Own goals				2								2		
Totals				43	81	7			1	1		43	82	8

=== Hat-tricks ===
No.	Player	Against	Result	Date	Competition
15	(Hungary) Márk Petneházi^{4}	SZEOL (A)	5–0	20 November 2016	Nemzeti Bajnokság II

^{4} – Player scored four goals.

=== Clean sheets ===
			Clean sheets		
No.	Player	Games Played	Nemzeti Bajnokság II	Magyar Kupa	Total
1	(Hungary) Norbert Tajti	34	7	0	8
16	(Hungary) Bálint Filipánics	5	1		1
26	(Hungary) Tamás Kis				
Totals			1		8
