= 2014–15 Szombathelyi Haladás season =

Szombathelyi Haladás
2014–15 season
- Chairman: (Hungary) Béla Illés
- Manager: (Hungary) Tamás Artner, (Hungary) Lázár Szentes, (Hungary) Attila Kuttor, (Hungary) Géza Mészöly
- Hungarian Cup: Round 3
- Hungarian League Cup: Round of 16
Home colours	Away colours

The 2014–15 season will be Szombathelyi Haladás's 59th competitive season, 7th consecutive season in the OTP Bank Liga and 95th year in existence as a football club.

== Players ==
As of 20 January 2014. Note: Flags indicate national team as defined under FIFA eligibility rules; some limited exceptions apply. Players may hold more than one non-FIFA nationality.

No.	Pos.	Nation	Player
1	GK	ROU	Laurențiu Brănescu
3	DF	HUN	Zoltán Fehér
4	DF	HUN	Gábor Jánvári
7	MF	HUN	András Radó
8	MF	HUN	Ádám Dudás
9	FW	ITA	Leandro Martínez
10	MF	ITA	Andrea Mancini
12	MF	HUN	András Jancsó
13	DF	ITA	Raffaele Alcibiade
15	MF	HUN	Bence Iszlai
16	MF	HUN	Barnabás Rácz
17	MF	HUN	Patrik Nagy
18	FW	ITA	Tommaso Rocchi
19	DF	HUN	Máté Czingráber
21	FW	HUN	Olivér Tihanyi
23	DF	HUN	Szabolcs Schimmer

No.	Pos.	Nation	Player
24	DF	HUN	Zsolt Angyal
26	DF	HUN	Márk Jagodics
28	MF	HUN	Balázs Petró
30	MF	HUN	Bence Grabant
32	FW	HUN	Bálint Gaál
35	DF	HUN	János Hegedűs
45	MF	HUN	Márió Németh
66	GK	HUN	Dániel Rózsa
69	DF	HUN	Szilárd Devecseri
75	GK	HUN	László Gyűrű
79	MF	HUN	Péter Halmosi (captain)
85	DF	SUI	Arnaud Bühler
90	DF	HUN	Máté Katona
96	MF	HUN	Milán Török
98	MF	HUN	Bálint Kretz

== Transfers ==
=== Summer ===
In: Note: Flags indicate national team as defined under FIFA eligibility rules; some limited exceptions apply. Players may hold more than one non-FIFA nationality.

No.	Pos.	Nation	Player
—	GK	HUN	Márton Gyurján (from Haladás II)
—	DF	HUN	Márk Jagodics (loan return from FC Ajka)
—	DF	HUN	Márk Farkas (loan return from Gyirmót SE)
—	DF	HUN	Máté Katona (from Soproni VSE)
—	DF	HUN	Zsolt Angyal (from Haladás II)
—	MF	HUN	Máté Hanzl (loan return from FC Ajka)
—	MF	HUN	Viktor Városi (from Pécs)
—	MF	HUN	Olivér Nagy (from Paks)
—	MF	HUN	Gábor Varga (from Soproni VSE)
—	MF	HUN	Máté Skriba (loan return from FC Ajka)
—	MF	HUN	Kornél Kulcsár (loan return from Lombard-Pápa TFC)
—	MF	HUN	Barnabás Rácz (from Haladás II)
—	MF	HUN	András Jancsó (from Haladás II)
—	MF	HUN	Martin Tóth (from Haladás II)
—	MF	SVK	Kamil Kopúnek (from (Azerbaijan) Ravan Baku)
—	MF	UKR	Andriy Efremov (from (Ukraine) Chaika Kievo-Svyatoshynsky Rayon)
—	FW	HUN	Olivér Tihanyi (from Haladás II)
—	FW	HUN	Richárd Czafit (loan return from Balatonfüredi FC)
—	FW	HUN	Balázs Zamostny (loan from Újpest)
—	FW	ITA	Tommaso Rocchi (from (Italy) Padova)

Out: Note: Flags indicate national team as defined under FIFA eligibility rules; some limited exceptions apply. Players may hold more than one non-FIFA nationality.

No.	Pos.	Nation	Player
—	GK	HUN	Dávid Dombó (to (Austria) SV Lafnitz)
—	DF	HUN	Predrag Bošnjak (to Ferencváros)
—	DF	HUN	Richárd Guzmics (to (Poland) Wisła Kraków)
—	DF	HUN	Péter Tóth (to (Austria) SC Pinkafeld)
—	MF	HUN	Gábor Nagy (to Újpest)
—	MF	HUN	Kornél Kulcsár (loan to Mezőkövesd-Zsóry SE)
—	MF	HUN	Ramon Halmai (to MTK Budapest)
—	MF	HUN	Milán Kalász (to FC Ajka)
—	MF	HUN	Máté Skriba (to FC Veszprém)
—	MF	HUN	Máté Hanzl (to Mezőkövesd-Zsóry SE)
—	MF	HUN	Ádám Simon (loan return to (Italy) Palermo)
—	MF	HUN	Gábor Varga (loan to FC Ajka)
—	FW	HUN	Ádám Hrepka (to MTK Budapest)

=== Winter ===
In: Note: Flags indicate national team as defined under FIFA eligibility rules; some limited exceptions apply. Players may hold more than one non-FIFA nationality.

No.	Pos.	Nation	Player
—	GK	ROU	Laurențiu Brănescu (loan from Juventus FC)
—	DF	ITA	Raffaele Alcibiade (loan from Budapest Honvéd)
—	DF	HUN	Gábor Jánvári (from Nyíregyháza Spartacus)
—	DF	SUI	Arnaud Bühler (from (Switzerland) FC Sion)
—	MF	HUN	Patrik Nagy (from (Germany) SV Seligenporten)
—	MF	HUN	Ádám Dudás (from Győri ETO FC)
—	MF	ITA	Andrea Mancini (from Budapest Honvéd)
—	FW	ITA	Leandro Martínez (from Győri ETO FC)

Out: Note: Flags indicate national team as defined under FIFA eligibility rules; some limited exceptions apply. Players may hold more than one non-FIFA nationality.

No.	Pos.	Nation	Player
—	GK	HUN	Roland Mursits (to Békéscsaba 1912 Előre SE)
—	DF	HUN	Gábor Dvorschák (to Mezőkövesd-Zsóry SE)
—	DF	HUN	Márk Farkas (loan to Várda SE)
—	DF	HUN	Martin Zsirai (loan to FC Ajka)
—	MF	HUN	Attila Szakály (to Zalaegerszegi TE)
—	MF	UKR	Andriy Efremov (loan to (Slovakia) TJ OFC Gabčíkovo)
—	FW	HUN	Viktor Városi (to Zalaegerszegi TE)
—	MF	HUN	Olivér Nagy (loan to (Romania) FC Ceahlăul Piatra Neamț)
—	MF	SVK	Kamil Kopúnek (to (Czech Republic) FC Zbrojovka Brno)
—	MF	HUN	Bence Gyurján (to Gyirmót SE)
—	FW	HUN	Balázs Zamostny (loan return to Újpest FC)
—	FW	HUN	Zoltán Medgyes (loan to Mezőkövesd-Zsóry SE)

== Statistics ==
=== Appearances and goals ===
Last updated on 26 October 2014.

No.	Pos	Nat	Player	Total		OTP Bank Liga		Hungarian Cup		League Cup	
No.	Pos	Nat	Player	Apps	Goals	Apps	Goals	Apps	Goals	Apps	Goals
3	DF	(Hungary) HUN	Zoltán Fehér	10	0	8	0	2	0	0	0
6	MF	(Hungary) HUN	Attila Szakály	16	0	10	0	3	0	3	0
7	FW	(Hungary) HUN	András Radó	5	0	5	0	0	0	0	0
8	MF	(Ukraine) UKR	Andriy Efremov	1	0	1	0	0	0	0	0
9	MF	(Hungary) HUN	Viktor Városi	10	1	4	0	2	0	4	1
10	MF	(Hungary) HUN	Olivér Nagy	13	1	11	1	1	0	1	0
11	MF	(Hungary) HUN	Gábor Varga	4	0	3	0	1	0	0	0
12	MF	(Hungary) HUN	András Jancsó	9	0	7	0	0	0	2	0
13	MF	(Hungary) HUN	Bence Gyurján	11	4	6	1	2	3	3	0
14	DF	(Hungary) HUN	Gábor Dvorschák	12	0	8	0	2	0	2	0
15	MF	(Hungary) HUN	Bence Iszlai	11	0	10	0	1	0	0	0
18	FW	(Italy) ITA	Tommaso Rocchi	7	3	6	1	0	0	1	2
23	DF	(Hungary) HUN	Szabolcs Schimmer	15	0	11	0	3	0	1	0
26	DF	(Hungary) HUN	Márk Jagodics	13	0	9	0	3	0	1	0
32	FW	(Hungary) HUN	Bálint Gaál	15	5	11	1	3	3	1	1
33	DF	(Hungary) HUN	Márk Farkas	7	0	1	0	2	0	4	0
41	MF	(Slovakia) SVK	Kamil Kopúnek	6	0	3	0	1	0	2	0
45	MF	(Hungary) HUN	Márió Németh	11	2	5	0	3	2	3	0
66	GK	(Hungary) HUN	Dániel Rózsa	14	-17	12	-16	2	-1	0	0
69	DF	(Hungary) HUN	Szilárd Devecseri	16	0	12	0	3	0	1	0
77	FW	(Hungary) HUN	Zoltán Medgyes	6	0	3	0	1	0	2	0
79	MF	(Hungary) HUN	Péter Halmosi	12	1	9	1	1	0	2	0
90	DF	(Hungary) HUN	Máté Katona	11	0	9	0	2	0	0	0
92	FW	(Hungary) HUN	Balázs Zamostny	11	5	4	0	3	3	4	2
Youth players:
2	MF	(Hungary) HUN	Bence Grabant	1	0	0	0	0	0	1	0
4	FW	(Hungary) HUN	Milán Bölcsföldi	1	0	0	0	0	0	1	0
5	DF	(Hungary) HUN	Martin Zsirai	4	0	0	0	0	0	4	0
6	MF	(Hungary) HUN	János Hegedűs	1	0	0	0	0	0	1	0
8	MF	(Hungary) HUN	Milán Török	1	0	0	0	0	0	1	0
11	MF	(Hungary) HUN	Áron Németh	1	0	0	0	0	0	1	0
12	DF	(Hungary) HUN	Patrik Füredi	1	0	0	0	0	0	1	0
14	MF	(Hungary) HUN	Barnabás Soltész	1	0	0	0	0	0	1	0
16	MF	(Hungary) HUN	Barnabás Rácz	2	0	0	0	0	0	2	0
16	DF	(Hungary) HUN	Alex Dedics	1	0	0	0	0	0	1	0
24	DF	(Hungary) HUN	Zsolt Angyal	4	0	0	0	0	0	4	0
30	GK	(Hungary) HUN	Márton Gyurján	4	-4	0	0	1	-2	3	-2
88	MF	(Hungary) HUN	Martin Tóth	2	0	0	0	0	0	2	0
91	GK	(Hungary) HUN	Roland Mursits	2	-1	0	0	0	0	2	-1
Players no longer at the club:

=== Top scorers ===
Includes all competitive matches. The list is sorted by shirt number when total goals are equal.

Last updated on 26 October 2014

Position	Nation	Number	Name	OTP Bank Liga	Hungarian Cup	League Cup	Total
1	(Hungary)	32	Bálint Gaál	1	3	1	5
2	(Hungary)	92	Balázs Zamostny	0	3	2	5
3	(Hungary)	13	Bence Gyurján	1	3	0	4
4	(Italy)	18	Tommaso Rocchi	1	0	2	3
5	(Hungary)	45	Márió Németh	0	2	0	2
6	(Hungary)	10	Olivér Nagy	1	0	0	1
7	(Hungary)	79	Péter Halmosi	1	0	0	1
8	(Hungary)	9	Viktor Városi	0	0	1	1
/	/	/	Own Goals	0	0	0	0
			TOTALS	5	11	6	23

=== Disciplinary record ===
Includes all competitive matches. Players with 1 card or more included only.

Last updated on 26 October 2014

Position	Nation	Number	Name	OTP Bank Liga		Hungarian Cup		League Cup		Total (Hu Total)	
Position	Nation	Number	Name	Booked	Sent off (straight red)	Booked	Sent off (straight red)	Booked	Sent off (straight red)	Booked	Sent off (straight red)
DF	(Hungary)	3	Zoltán Fehér	3	0	1	0	0	0	4 (3)	0 (0)
DF	(Hungary)	5	Martin Zsirai	0	0	0	0	1	0	1 (0)	0 (0)
MF	(Hungary)	6	Attila Szakály	3	0	0	0	0	0	3 (3)	0 (0)
MF	(Hungary)	10	Olivér Nagy	2	0	1	0	0	0	3 (2)	0 (0)
MF	(Hungary)	12	András Jancsó	2	0	0	0	0	0	2 (2)	0 (0)
MF	(Hungary)	13	Bence Gyurján	1	0	1	0	1	0	3 (1)	0 (0)
DF	(Hungary)	14	Gábor Dvorschák	2	0	0	0	0	0	2 (2)	0 (0)
MF	(Hungary)	15	Bence Iszlai	5	0	0	0	0	0	5 (5)	0 (0)
FW	(Italy)	18	Tommaso Rocchi	1	0	0	0	0	0	1 (1)	0 (0)
DF	(Hungary)	23	Szabolcs Schimmer	3	0	0	0	0	0	3 (3)	0 (0)
DF	(Hungary)	26	Márk Jagodics	2	0	1	0	0	0	3 (2)	0 (0)
FW	(Hungary)	32	Bálint Gaál	1	0	1	0	0	0	2 (1)	0 (0)
DF	(Hungary)	33	Márk Farkas	1	0	0	0	0	0	1 (1)	0 (0)
MF	(Slovakia)	41	Kamil Kopúnek	0	1	0	0	0	0	0 (0)	1 (1)
MF	(Hungary)	45	Márió Németh	0	0	0	0	1	0	1 (0)	0 (0)
GK	(Hungary)	66	Dániel Rózsa	1	0	0	0	0	0	1 (1)	0 (0)
DF	(Hungary)	69	Szilárd Devecseri	5	0	2	0	0	0	7 (5)	0 (0)
MF	(Hungary)	79	Péter Halmosi	3	1	0	1	0	0	3 (3)	2 (1)
DF	(Hungary)	90	Máté Katona	6	0	0	0	0	0	6 (6)	0 (0)
FW	(Hungary)	92	Balázs Zamostny	0	0	0	0	1	0	1 (0)	0 (0)
			TOTALS	41	2	7	1	4	0	52 (41)	3 (2)

=== Overall ===
Games played	19 (12 OTP Bank Liga, 3 Hungarian Cup and 4 Hungarian League Cup)
Games won	6 (2 OTP Bank Liga, 2 Hungarian Cup and 2 Hungarian League Cup)
Games drawn	3 (2 OTP Bank Liga, 0 Hungarian Cup and 1 Hungarian League Cup)
Games lost	10 (8 OTP Bank Liga, 1 Hungarian Cup and 1 Hungarian League Cup)
Goals scored	22
Goals conceded	22
Goal difference	0
Yellow cards	52
Red cards	3
Worst discipline	(Hungary) Péter Halmosi (3 (yellow card) , 2 (red card) )
Worst discipline	(Hungary) Szilárd Devecseri (7 (yellow card) , 0 (red card) )
Best result	7-0 (A) v Fertőszentmiklós - Magyar Kupa - 10-09-2014
Worst result	0–3 (A) v Diósgyőr - OTP Bank Liga - 10-08-2014
Most appearances	(Hungary) Attila Szakály (16 appearances)
Most appearances	(Hungary) Szilárd Devecseri (16 appearances)
Top scorer	(Hungary) Bálint Gaál (5 goals)
Top scorer	(Hungary) Balázs Zamostny (5 goals)
Points	21/57 (36.84%)

Last updated: 26 October 2014

== Nemzeti Bajnokság I ==
=== Matches ===
26 July 2014 1	Haladás	0 – 1	Újpest	Szombathely, Vas County
20:30 CEST		Report	Suljić 83'	Stadium: Rohonci Street Stadium; Attendance: 2,950; Referee: (Hungary) Péter Solymosi

2 August 2014 2	Kecskemét	0 – 1	Haladás	Kecskemét, Bács-Kiskun County
20:30 CEST		Report	Nagy O. 2'	Stadium: Széktói Stadion; Attendance: 1,411; Referee: (Hungary) Ádám Farkas

10 August 2014 3	DVTK	3 – 0	Haladás	Miskolc, Borsod-Abaúj-Zemplén County
18:30 CEST	Jagodics 68' (o.g.); Németh 82'; Fehér 90' (o.g.)	Report		Stadium: DVTK Stadion; Attendance: 5,156; Referee: (Hungary) Ádám Németh

17 August 2014 4	Haladás	1 – 1	Pécs	Szombathely, Vas County
18:30 CEST	Halmosi 64'	Report	Heffler 75'	Stadium: Rohonci Street Stadium; Attendance: 2,450; Referee: (Hungary) István Vad

24 August 2014 5	Debrecen	1 – 0	Haladás	Debrecen, Hajdú-Bihar County
20:30 CEST	Kulcsár 50'	Report		Stadium: Nagyerdei Stadion; Attendance: 3,930; Referee: (Hungary) Mihály Fábián

29 August 2014 6	Haladás	1 – 3	Paks	Szombathely, Vas County
19:00 CEST	Gaál 42'	Report	Fiola 30'; Könyves 51', 77'	Stadium: Rohonci Street Stadium; Attendance: 2,250; Referee: (Hungary) Péter Solymosi

13 September 2014 7	Honvéd	2 – 0	Haladás	Budapest, Pest County
16:30 CEST	Portilla 13'; Hidi 43'	Report		Stadium: Bozsik Stadion; Attendance: 800; Referee: (Hungary) Ádám Németh

20 September 2014 8	Haladás	0 – 2	Videoton	Szombathely, Vas County
18:30 CEST		Report	Nikolić 21', 33'	Stadium: Stadion Rohonci Út; Attendance: 2,120; Referee: (Hungary) Sándor Andó-Szabó

28 September 2014 9	Ferencváros	0 – 0	Haladás	Budapest, Pest County
18:30 CET		Report		Stadium: Groupama Arena; Attendance: 7,400; Referee: (Hungary) Mihály Fábián

5 October 2014 10	Haladás	2 – 0	Pápa	Szombathely, Vas County
18:30 CEST	Rocchi 31'; Gyurján 84'	Report		Stadium: Rohonci úti Stadion; Attendance: 2,240; Referee: (Hungary) Viktor Kassai

17 October 2014 11	Dunaújváros	1 – 0	Haladás	Dunaújváros, Fejér County
19:00 CEST	Nikházi 28'	Report		Stadium: Dunaferr Arena; Attendance: 2,241; Referee: (Hungary) Péter Solymosi

26 October 2014 12	Haladás	0 – 2	Győri ETO	Szombathely, Vas County
18:30 CET		Report	Varga R. 36'; Völgyi 42'	Stadium: Rohonci Street Stadium; Attendance: 1,630; Referee: (Hungary) István Vad

1 November 2014 13	Nyíregyháza	2 – 0	Haladás	Nyíregyháza, Szabolcs-Szatmár-Bereg County
16:00 CET	Koller 64'; Törtei 76'	(Report)		Stadium: Városi Stadion; Attendance: 1,561; Referee: (Hungary) Ádám Németh

9 November 2014 14	Haladás	0 – 3	MTK	Szombathely, Vas County
16:30 CET		(Report)	Hrepka 4'; Torghelle 85'; Bese 88'	Stadium: Rohonci Street Stadium; Attendance: 1,300; Referee: (Hungary) Sándor Andó-Szabó

22 November 2014 15	Puskás Akadémia	1 – 0	Haladás	Felcsút, Fejér County
16:00 CEST	Tischler 35'	(Report)		Stadium: Pancho Arena; Attendance: 400; Referee: (Hungary) Ádám Németh

29 November 2014 16	Újpest	1 – 0	Haladás	Budapest, Pest County
14:00 CEST	Stanisavljević 76'	(Report)		Stadium: Szusza Ferenc Stadium; Attendance: 1,806; Referee: (Hungary) Ádám Farkas

6 December 2014 17	Haladás	3 – 1	Kecskemét	Szombathely, Vas County
18:00 CET	Iszlai 8' (pen.); Varga R. 16' (o.g.); Devecseri 60'	(Report)	Novák Cs. 90+1'	Stadium: Rohonci Street Stadium; Attendance: 1,000; Referee: (Hungary) Péter Solymosi

28 February 2015 18	Haladás	1 – 1	DVTK	Szombathely, Vas County
14:00 CEST	Németh M. 64'	Report	Krstić 17'	Stadium: Rohonci Street Stadium; Attendance: 2,130; Referee: (Hungary) Zsolt Szabó

7 March 2015 19	Pécs	2 – 1	Haladás	Pécs, Baranya County
16:00 CEST	Pauljević 5'; Uzoma 62'	(Report)	Martínez 75'	Stadium: Stadion PMFC; Attendance: 1,428; Referee: (Hungary) Ádám Farkas

14 March 2015 20	Haladás	2 – 0	Debrecen	Szombathely, Vas County
18:00 CEST	Martínez 33' 42'	(Report)		Stadium: Rohonci úti Stadion; Attendance: 1,738; Referee: (Hungary) Zoltán Iványi

20 March 2015 21	Paks	1 – 2	Haladás	Paks, Tolna County
19:00 CET	Balázs Zs. 47'	(Report)	Halmosi 45'; Martínez 66' (pen.)	Stadium: Stadion PSE; Attendance: 1,148; Referee: (Hungary) István Vad

5 April 2015 22	Haladás	1 – 3	Budapest Honvéd	Szombathely, Vas County
16:30 CEST	Radó 21'	(Report)	Ignjatović 14'; Prosser 40'; Punoševac 42'	Stadium: Rohonci Street Stadium; Attendance: 2,135; Referee: (Hungary) Péter Solymosi

12 April 2015 23	Videoton	7 – 0	Haladás	Székesfehérvár, Fejér County
18:30 CEST	Nikolić 23'; Feczesin 53' 63'; Trebotić 70' 73'; Oliveira 86'; Fehér Z. 87' (o.g.)	(Report)		Stadium: Sóstói Stadion; Attendance: 2,510; Referee: (Hungary) Ádám Farkas

18 April 2015 24	Haladás	0 – 3	Ferencváros	Szombathely, Vas County
16:00 CET		(Report)	Böde 22' 33'; Varga R. 51'	Stadium: Rohonci Street Stadium; Attendance: 2,980; Referee: (Hungary) Zsolt Szabó

25 April 2015 25	Lombard Pápa	2 – 2	Haladás	Pápa, Veszprém County
18:30 CET	Popin 4'; Seye 7'	(Report)	Jagodics M. 17'; Radó 49'	Stadium: Stadion Várkerti; Attendance: 1,800; Referee: (Hungary) Viktor Kassai

2 May 2015 26	Haladás	1 – 4	Dunaújváros	Szombathely, Vas County
18:30 CEST	Rocchi 71'	Report	Eppel 45' 48' 79'; Jakab D. 53'	Stadium: Rohonci Street Stadium; Attendance: 2,436; Referee: (Hungary) József Erdős

9 May 2015 27	Győri ETO	3 – 2	Haladás	Győr, Győr-Moson-Sopron County
18:30 CET	Rudolf 8'; Koltai 39'; Lipták 48'	(Report)	Martínez 28'; Radó 66'	Stadium: ETO Park; Attendance: 1,600; Referee: (Hungary) Zoltán Iványi

15 May 2015 28	Haladás	3 – 1	Nyíregyháza	Szombathely, Vas County
19:00 CEST	Radó 52' 90'; Halmosi 73'	Report	Halenár 34'	Stadium: Rohonci Street Stadium; Attendance: 1,945; Referee: (Hungary) Péter Solymosi

23 May 2015 29	MTK	2 – 0	Haladás	Budapest, Pest County
16:00 CEST	Torghelle 35' 87'	(Report)		Stadium: Bozsik Stadion; Attendance: 768; Referee: (Hungary) Viktor Kassai

30 May 2015 30	Haladás	3 – 0	Puskás Akadémia	Szombathely, Vas County
19:00 CET	Martínez 27' (pen.); Rocchi 80'; Radó 86'	(Report)		Stadium: Rohonci Street Stadium; Attendance: 3,087; Referee: (Hungary) Sándor Andó-Szabó

== League table ==
Pos	Team	Pld	W	D	L	GF	GA	GD	Pts	Qualification or relegation
12	Nyíregyháza (R)	30	8	6	16	33	49	−16	30	Relegation to Nemzeti Bajnokság III (Note: Kecskemét, Nyíregyháza and Pécs won't be members of 2015–16 Nemzeti Bajnokság I due to licence problems)
13	Honvéd	30	6	10	14	26	36	−10	28	
14	Haladás	30	7	4	19	26	53	−27	25	
15	Dunaújváros (Note: Dunaújváros deducted 1 point) (R)	30	5	8	17	26	49	−23	22	Relegation to Nemzeti Bajnokság II
16	Pápa (R)	30	4	7	19	14	57	−43	19	Dissolved - Pápai PFC in the Veszprém County Football League One as successor

Source: mlsz.hu (in Hungarian)
Rules for classification: 1st points; 2nd overall wins; 3rd goal difference; 4th head-to-head points; 5th head-to-head goal difference; 6th head-to-head away goals scored; 7th fair-play points; 8th drawing of lots
(R) Relegated

=== Results summary ===
Overall								Home						Away					
Pld	W	D	L	GF	GA	GD	Pts	W	D	L	GF	GA	GD	W	D	L	GF	GA	GD
30	7	4	19	26	53	−27	25	5	2	8	18	25	−7	2	2	11	8	28	−20

Last updated: 26 October 2014.
Source: NB1

=== Results by round ===
Round	1	2	3	4	5	6	7	8	9	10	11	12	13	14	15	16	17	18	19	20	21	22	23	24	25	26	27	28	29	30
Ground	H	A	A	H	A	H	A	H	A	H	A	H	A	H	A	A	H	H	A	H	A	H	A	H	A	H	A	H	A	H
Result	L	W	L	D	L	L	L	L	D	W	L	L	L	L	L	L	W	D	L	W	W	L	L	L	D	L	L	W	L	W
Position	11	9	12	9	11	13	14	15	15	15	15	15	16	16	16	16	15	16	16	14	12	12	13	14	14	15	15	14	14	14

Updated to match(es) played on 26 October 2014. Source: Matches
A = Away; H = Home; W = Win; D = Draw; L = Loss

== Hungarian Cup ==
13 August 2014 Round 1	Dorog	1 – 4	Haladás	Dorog, Komárom-Esztergom County
17:00 CEST	Fürjes 36' (pen.)	Report	Zamostny 45' (pen.); Gaál 55' 79'; Németh 69'	Stadium: Jenő Buzánszky Stadium; Attendance: 200; Referee: (Hungary) Ádám Radványi

10 September 2014 Round 2	Fertőszentmiklós	0 – 7	Haladás	Fertőszentmiklós, Győr-Moson-Sopron County
15:30 CEST		Report	Gaál 62'; Németh 68'; Zamostny 74', 79'; Gyurján 76', 85', 89'	Stadium: Városi Sporttelep; Attendance: 500; Referee: (Hungary) Szabolcs Szilasi

24 September 2014 Round 3	Újpest	2 – 0	Haladás	Budapest, Pest County
17:00 CEST	Vasiljević 22', 78'	Report		Stadium: Szusza Ferenc Stadium; Attendance: 700; Referee: (Hungary) István Vad

== Ligakupa ==
=== Group stage ===
2 September 2014 1	Pápa	0 – 2	Haladás	Pápa, Veszprém County
17:00 CEST		Report	Gaál 11'; Városi 20'	Stadium: Stadion Várkerti; Attendance: 200; Referee: (Hungary) Gergely Szőts

16 September 2014 2	Haladás	2 – 0	Siófok	Szombathely, Vas County
14:00 CEST	Rocchi 30', 45'	Report		Stadium: Illés Akadémia; Attendance: 150; Referee: (Hungary) Tibor Farkas

7 October 2014 3	Haladás	1 – 1	Sopron	Szombathely, Vas County
17:00 CEST	Zamostny 60' (pen.)	Report	Kovács Á. 68'	Stadium: Rohonci úti Stadion; Attendance: 100; Referee: (Hungary) Attila Molnár

15 October 2014 4	Sopron	2 – 1	Haladás	Sopron, Győr-Moson-Sopron County
17:00 CEST	Szabó 9' (pen.); Erdélyi 52' (pen.)	Report	Zamostny 40' (pen.)	Stadium: Káposztás utcai Stadion; Attendance: 300; Referee: (Hungary) Ádám Radványi

11 November 2014 5	Siófok	0 – 4	Haladás	Siófok, Somogy County
13:00 CEST		(Report)	Gyurján B. 49'; Nagy O. 57'; Efremov 68'; Városi 78'	Stadium: Révész Street Stadium; Attendance: 50; Referee: (Hungary) Zoltán J. Kovács

18 November 2014 6	Haladás	2 – 1	Lombard Pápa	Szombathely, Vas County
14:30 CEST	Nagy O. 40' (pen.); Zamostny 48'	(Report)	Hirschler B. 38' (o.g.)	Stadium: Illés Akadémia; Attendance: 100; Referee: (Hungary) Attila Molnár

Pos	Team	Pld	W	D	L	GF	GA	GD	Pts	Qualification	HAL	SOP	PÁP	SIÓ
1	Haladás	6	4	1	1	12	4	+8	13	Advance to knockout phase	—	1–1	2–1	2–0
2	Sopron	6	3	1	2	7	5	+2	10	Advance to knockout phase	2–1	—	2–0	0–2
3	Pápa	6	2	1	3	5	7	−2	7		0–2	1–0	—	2–0
4	Siófok	6	1	1	4	3	11	−8	4		0–4	0–2	1–1	—

Source: Soccerway

=== Knockout phase ===
2 December 2014 Round of 16 (1st leg)	Pécs	0 – 0	Haladás	Pécs, Baranya County
16:00 CET		(Report)		Stadium: Stadion PMFC; Attendance: 100; Referee: (Hungary) István Vad

9 December 2014 Round of 16 (2nd leg)	Haladás	1 – 2 (1 – 2 agg.)	Pécs	Szombathely, Vas County
16:00 CET	Rocchi 41'	(Report)	Wittrédi 17', 31'	Stadium: Rohonci úti Stadion; Attendance: 100; Referee: (Hungary) Zsolt Szabó

== Friendly games (2014) ==
28 June 2014	Szombathelyi Haladás	2 – 3	FC Spartak Trnava (Slovakia)	Szombathely, Vas County
11:00 CET (UTC+01)	Tihanyi O. 17'; Zamostny 24'	(Report)	Mikovič 36'; Špalek 68'; Casado 87'	Stadium: Rohonci Street Stadium; Attendance: 200; Referee: (Hungary) Tamás Bognár

2 July 2014	Szombathelyi Haladás	0 – 5	FC Terek Grozny (Russia)	Oberschützen, Oberwart District
18:00 CET (UTC+01)		(Report)	Aílton 4' 29'; Rybus 28'; Bokila 53'; Kadiyev 75'	Attendance: 50; Referee: (Austria) Braunschwill

4 July 2014 Király kupa	Szombathelyi Haladás	1 – 0	CS Concordia Chiajna (Romania)	Szombathely, Vas County
14:00 CET (UTC+01)	Zamostny 52'	(Report)		Stadium: Király Sportlétesítmény; Attendance: 200; Referee: (Hungary) Norbert Kiss

4 July 2014 Király kupa	Szombathelyi Haladás	2 – 2 (5-4 p)	Puskás Akadémia FC	Szombathely, Vas County
19:00 CET (UTC+01)	Nagy O. 23'; Radó 75'	(Report)	Czvitkovics 29' (pen.); Lencse 51'	Stadium: Király Sportlétesítmény; Attendance: 400; Referee: (Hungary) Ádám Radványi
	Penalties
	Iszlai (penalty scored); Zamostny (penalty scored); Varga G. (penalty scored); Dvorschák (penalty scored); Radó (penalty scored)		(penalty scored) Lencse; (penalty missed) Gohér; (penalty scored) Tar; (penalty scored) Szakály D. (penalty scored) Czvitkovics

7 July 2014	Szombathelyi Haladás	1 – 4	FC Ural Sverdlovsk Oblast (Russia)	Olbendorf, Güssing District
17:00 CET (UTC+01)	Nagy O. 12'		Gogniev 10'; Acevedo 31' 77'; Lungu 39'	Attendance: 100; Referee: (Austria) Paukovits

10 July 2014	Szombathelyi Haladás	3 – 1	Zalaegerszegi TE	Szombathely, Vas County
17:00 CET (UTC+01)	Radó 39' 56' (pen.) 84'	(Report)	Babati B. 63'	Stadium: Rohonci Street Stadium; Attendance: 300; Referee: (Hungary) István Mód

16 July 2014	Szombathelyi Haladás	3 – 0	Szolnoki MÁV FC	Szombathely, Vas County
17:00 CET (UTC+01)	Szakály A. 25'; Radó 47' (pen.); Efremov 70'	(Report)		Stadium: Rohonci Street Stadium; Attendance: 300; Referee: (Hungary) Norbert Kiss

19 July 2014	Szombathelyi Haladás	1 – 0	Soproni VSE	Szombathely, Vas County
10:00 CET (UTC+01)	Jancsó 61'	(Report)		Stadium: Király Sportlétesítmény; Attendance: 200; Referee: (Hungary) Attila Molnár

5 August 2014	Kasımpaşa Spor Kulübü (Turkey)	4 – 0	Szombathelyi Haladás	Wien, Austria
19:00 CET (UTC+01)	Öztürk 14' 52'; M. Kula 61'; Büyük 90'	(Report)		Stadium: Sportplatz Donau; Referee: (Austria)

14 November 2014	SK Sturm Graz (Austria)	4 – 2	Szombathelyi Haladás	Wildon, Leibnitz District
17:00 CET (UTC+01)	Madl 24'; Stanković 51'; Tadić 54' 80'	(Report)	Gaál B. 34'; Városi 70'	Stadium: Stadion Wildon; Attendance: 220; Referee: (Austria) Eisner

== Friendly games (2015) ==
22 January 2015	Szombathelyi Haladás	2 – 0	FC Terek Grozny (Russia)	Manavgat, Turkey
16:00 CET (UTC+01)	Radó 58'; Gaál B. 64'	(Report)		Referee: (Turkey)

23 January 2015	Szombathelyi Haladás	1 – 4	FC Gazovik Orenburg (Russia)	Manavgat, Turkey
14:30 CET (UTC+01)	Rocchi 74'	(Report)	Afonin 3'; Kabutov 34'; Kobyalko 53' 60' (pen.)	Attendance: 50; Referee: (Turkey)

25 January 2015	Szombathelyi Haladás	0 – 2	Gabala FK (Azerbaijan)	Manavgat, Turkey
16:00 CET (UTC+01)		(Report)	Mendy 28'; E. Zamanov 69'	Referee: (Turkey)

27 January 2015	Szombathelyi Haladás	1 – 2	Pakhtakor Tashkent FK (Uzbekistan)	Manavgat, Turkey
16:00 CET (UTC+01)	Németh M. 40' (pen.)	(Report)	Makharadze 80' (pen.) 85'	Referee: (Turkey)

29 January 2015	Szombathelyi Haladás	1 – 1	FC Universitatea Cluj (Romania)	Manavgat, Turkey
14:00 CET (UTC+01)	Martínez 66' (pen.)	(Report)	Lemnaru 84' (pen.)	Referee: (Turkey)

10 February 2015	A.C. Bareggio San Martino (Italy)	1 – 5	Szombathelyi Haladás	Bareggio, Italy
20:00 CET (UTC+01)	44'	(Report)	A. Mancini 9'; Petró B. 30'; P. Vieira 55'; Rácz B. 72'; Gaál B. 80'	Referee: (Italy)

11 February 2015	Internazionale (Italy)	2 – 2	Szombathelyi Haladás	La Pinetina, Italy
15:15 CET (UTC+01)	Hernanes 15'; Pușcaș 62'	(Report)	Radó 50'; Martínez 60'	Stadium: Angelo Moratti Sports Centre; Referee: (Italy)

14 February 2015	SV Lafnitz (Austria)	3 – 4	Szombathelyi Haladás	Rohrbach an der Lafnitz, Hartberg-Fürstenfeld District
16:00 CET (UTC+01)	H. Ritter 10'; D. Beslic 54'; M. Kölbl 69'	(Report)	Gaál B. 7'; Alcibiade 17'; Rocchi 38'; Martínez 85'	Attendance: 200; Referee: (Austria)

21 February 2015	FC Spartak Trnava (Slovakia)	3 – 2	Szombathelyi Haladás	Trnava, Slovakia
14:30 CET (UTC+01)	Cléber 43' 55'; Mikovič 71'	(Report)	Martínez 30'; Németh M. 86'	Stadium: Štadión Antona Malatinského; Attendance: 1,554; Referee: (Slovakia)

25 March 2015	Zalaegerszegi TE	0 – 1	Szombathelyi Haladás	Zalaegerszeg, Zala County
18:00 CET (UTC+01)		(Report)	Radó 78'	Stadium: ZTE Arena; Attendance: 800; Referee: (Hungary)
