= Máté Czingráber =

Hungarian footballer (born 1997)

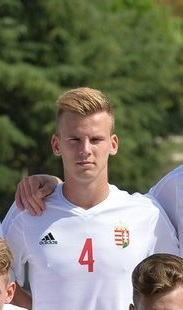
- Czingráber with Hungary U19 in 2015

Personal information
- Date of birth: 13 June 1997 (age 29)
- Place of birth: Sopron, Hungary
- Height: 1.83 m (6 ft 0 in)
- Position: Defender

Team information
- Current team: Mosonmagyaróvár
- Number: 4

Youth career
- 2005–2009: Soproni VSE
- 2009–2011: SC Sopron
- 2011–2015: Illés Akadémia

Senior career*
Years	Team	Apps	(Gls)
2014–2015	Haladás	2	(0)
2015–2018	Vasas	0	(0)
2015–2017	→ Siófok (loan)	59	(0)
2018	Soproni VSE	13	(0)
2018–2019	Pápa	2	(0)
2019–2020	Ózd	7	(0)
2020	Deutschkreutz	1	(0)
2020–	Mosonmagyaróvár	157	(11)
2022–2024	Mosonmagyaróvár II	5	(0)

International career
2015	Hungary U18	1	(0)
2015	Hungary U19	5	(0)
- * Club domestic league appearances and goals as of 29 March 2026

Máté Czingráber (born 13 June 1997) is a Hungarian professional footballer who plays as a defender for Nemzeti Bajnokság III club Mosonmagyaróvár.

== Career ==
Czingráber, aged 17, made his Nemzeti Bajnokság I debut in the 2014–15 season with Haladás.

On 20 January 2018, he signed with Nemzeti Bajnokság II club Soproni VSE.

== Career statistics ==
=== Club ===
As of match played 29 March 2026

Appearances and goals by club, season and competition
Club	Season	League			Magyar Kupa		Ligakupa		Other		Total	
Club	Season	Division	Apps	Goals	Apps	Goals	Apps	Goals	Apps	Goals	Apps	Goals
Haladás	2014–15	Nemzeti Bajnokság I	2	0	—		3	0	—		5	0
Siófok (loan)	2015–16	Nemzeti Bajnokság II	23	0	1	0	—		—		24	0
Siófok (loan)	2016–17	Nemzeti Bajnokság II	36	0	0	0	—		—		36	0
Siófok (loan)	Total		59	0	1	0	—		—		60	0
Vasas	2017–18	Nemzeti Bajnokság I	—		0	0	—		—		0	0
Soproni VSE	2017–18	Nemzeti Bajnokság II	13	0	—		—		—		13	0
Pápa	2018–19	Nemzeti Bajnokság III	2	0	—		—		—		2	0
Ózd	2019–20	Nemzeti Bajnokság III	7	0	2	0	—		—		9	0
Deutschkreutz	2019–20	Burgenlandliga	1	0	—		—		—		1	0
Mosonmagyaróvár	2020–21	Nemzeti Bajnokság III	29	3	1	0	—		—		30	3
Mosonmagyaróvár	2021–22	Nemzeti Bajnokság III	35	3	2	0	—		—		37	3
Mosonmagyaróvár	2022–23	Nemzeti Bajnokság II	21	0	1	0	—		—		22	0
Mosonmagyaróvár	2023–24	Nemzeti Bajnokság II	30	2	1	0	—		—		31	2
Mosonmagyaróvár	2024–25	Nemzeti Bajnokság III	20	2	3	2	—		2 (Note: Appearances in Nemzeti Bajnokság III promotion play-offs)	0	25	4
Mosonmagyaróvár	2025–26	Nemzeti Bajnokság III	22	1	2	0	—		—		24	1
Mosonmagyaróvár	Total		157	11	10	2	—		2	0	169	13
Mosonmagyaróvár II	2022–23	Megyei Bajnokság I	4	0	—		—		—		4	0
Mosonmagyaróvár II	2023–24	Megyei Bajnokság I	1	0	—		—		—		1	0
Mosonmagyaróvár II	Total		5	0	—		—		—		5	0
Career total			246	11	13	2	3	0	2	0	264	13

=== International ===
Appearances and goals by national team and year
Team	Year	Total	
Team	Year	Apps	Goals
Hungary U18	2015	1	0
Hungary U19	2015	5	0
Career total		6	0

== Honours ==
Mosonmagyaróvár

- Nemzeti Bajnokság III – West: 2021–22
- Nemzeti Bajnokság III – Northwest: 2024–25
