= Thomas Wils =

Belgian footballer

Personal information
- Full name: Thomas Wils
- Date of birth: 24 April 1990 (age 36)
- Place of birth: Turnhout, Belgium
- Height: 1.81 m (5 ft 11 in)
- Position: Defensive midfielder

Team information
- Current team: Royal Antwerp (youth coach)

Youth career
- 1997–2000: KVV Vosselaar
- 2000–2007: Lierse
- 2007–2009: Westerlo

Senior career*
Years	Team	Apps	(Gls)
2009–2015	Lierse	115	(0)
2010–2011	→ Turnhout	33	(0)
2015–2016	Haladás	28	(1)
2016–2018	Lierse	85	(0)
2018–2020	Lierse Kempenzonen	47	(1)
2020–2023	Turnhout		

Managerial career
- 2023–: Royal Antwerp (youth)
- * Club domestic league appearances and goals

Thomas Wils (born 24 April 1990) is a retired Belgian professional footballer who played as a defensive midfielder.

Wils made his debut during the 2009–10 season. He was loaned out to K.V. Turnhout during the 2010–11 season.

== Coaching career ==
After retiring, Wils began his coaching career at Royal Antwerp's academy. He also managed the Antwerps youth team that competed in the 2023-24 UEFA Youth League.
