= Richárd Kozma =

Hungarian footballer

Personal information
- Full name: Richárd Kozma
- Date of birth: 1 October 1994 (age 32)
- Place of birth: Nyíregyháza, Hungary
- Position: Midfielder

Team information
- Current team: Budapest Honvéd
- Number: 29

Youth career
- 2004–2009: Nyíregyháza
- 2009–2013: Budapest Honvéd

Senior career*
Years	Team	Apps	(Gls)
2013–	Budapest Honvéd	1	(0)
- * Club domestic league appearances and goals as of 28 July 2013

Richárd Kozma (born 1 October 1994 in Nyíregyháza) is a Hungarian football player who currently plays for Budapest Honvéd FC.
