= Norbert Farkas (footballer, born 1992) =

Hungarian professional footballer

Personal information
- Date of birth: 29 June 1992 (age 34)
- Place of birth: Székesfehérvár, Hungary
- Height: 1.84 m (6 ft 0 in)
- Position: Left back

Team information
- Current team: Iváncsa

Youth career
- 2004–2010: Videoton

Senior career*
Years	Team	Apps	(Gls)
2010–2014	Puskás	45	(0)
2014–2015	Zalaegerszeg	17	(0)
2015–2018	Siófok	82	(6)
2018–2019	Balmazújváros	17	(1)
2019	MTK Budapest	0	(0)
2019	→ Monori SE (loan)	15	(5)
2019–2020	MTE	7	(1)
2020–2023	Tiszakécske	91	(5)
2023–	Iváncsa	7	(1)

International career
2010–2011	Hungary U-19	4	(0)
2012–2013	Hungary U-21	5	(0)
- * Club domestic league appearances and goals as of 1 October 2023

Norbert Farkas (born 29 June 1992) is a Hungarian professional footballer who plays for Iváncsa.

== Career statistics ==
Appearances and goals by club, season and competition
Club	Season	League			Cup		League Cup		Europe		Total	
Club	Season	Division	Apps	Goals	Apps	Goals	Apps	Goals	Apps	Goals	Apps	Goals
Puskás
Puskás	2010–11	Nemzeti Bajnokság II	1	0	0	0	—		—		1	0
Puskás	2011–12	Nemzeti Bajnokság II	17	0	0	0	—		—		17	0
Puskás	2012–13	Nemzeti Bajnokság II	18	0	0	0	0	0	—		18	0
Puskás	2013–14	Nemzeti Bajnokság I	9	0	1	0	4	0	—		14	0
Puskás	Total		45	0	1	0	4	0	—		50	0
Zalaegerszeg	2014–15	Nemzeti Bajnokság II	17	0	1	0	5	0	—		23	0
Siófok
Siófok	2015–16	Nemzeti Bajnokság II	27	3	1	0	—		—		28	3
Siófok	2016–17	Nemzeti Bajnokság II	32	2	0	0	—		—		32	2
Siófok	2017–18	Nemzeti Bajnokság II	23	1	4	0	—		—		27	1
Siófok	Total		82	6	5	0	—		—		87	6
Balmazújváros	2018–19	Nemzeti Bajnokság II	17	1	1	0	—		—		18	1
Career total			161	7	8	0	9	0	0	0	178	7

Updated to games played as of 16 December 2018.
