= Gábor Gréczi =

Hungarian footballer

Personal information
- Full name: Gábor János Gréczi
- Date of birth: 3 May 1993 (age 33)
- Place of birth: Szeged, Hungary
- Height: 1.85 m (6 ft 1 in)
- Position: Winger

Youth career
- 2002–2011: Kecskemét

Senior career*
Years	Team	Apps	(Gls)
2013–2015	Kecskemét	35	(4)
2015–2017	Siófok	46	(9)
2017–2018	Nyíregyháza	6	(1)
2018–2022	Tiszakécske	45	(4)
- * Club domestic league appearances and goals as of 24 April 2022

Gábor Gréczi (born 3 May 1993) is a Hungarian professional footballer.

== Career statistics ==
Appearances and goals by club, season and competition
Club	Season	League			Cup		League Cup		Europe		Total	
Club	Season	Division	Apps	Goals	Apps	Goals	Apps	Goals	Apps	Goals	Apps	Goals
Kecskemét	2013–14	Nemzeti Bajnokság I	20	4	2	0	4	0	0	0	26	4
Kecskemét	2014–15	Nemzeti Bajnokság I	10	0	2	0	6	1	0	0	18	1
Career total			30	4	4	0	10	1	0	0	44	5

Updated to games played as of 6 December 2014.
