= Birkfeld =

- Municipality
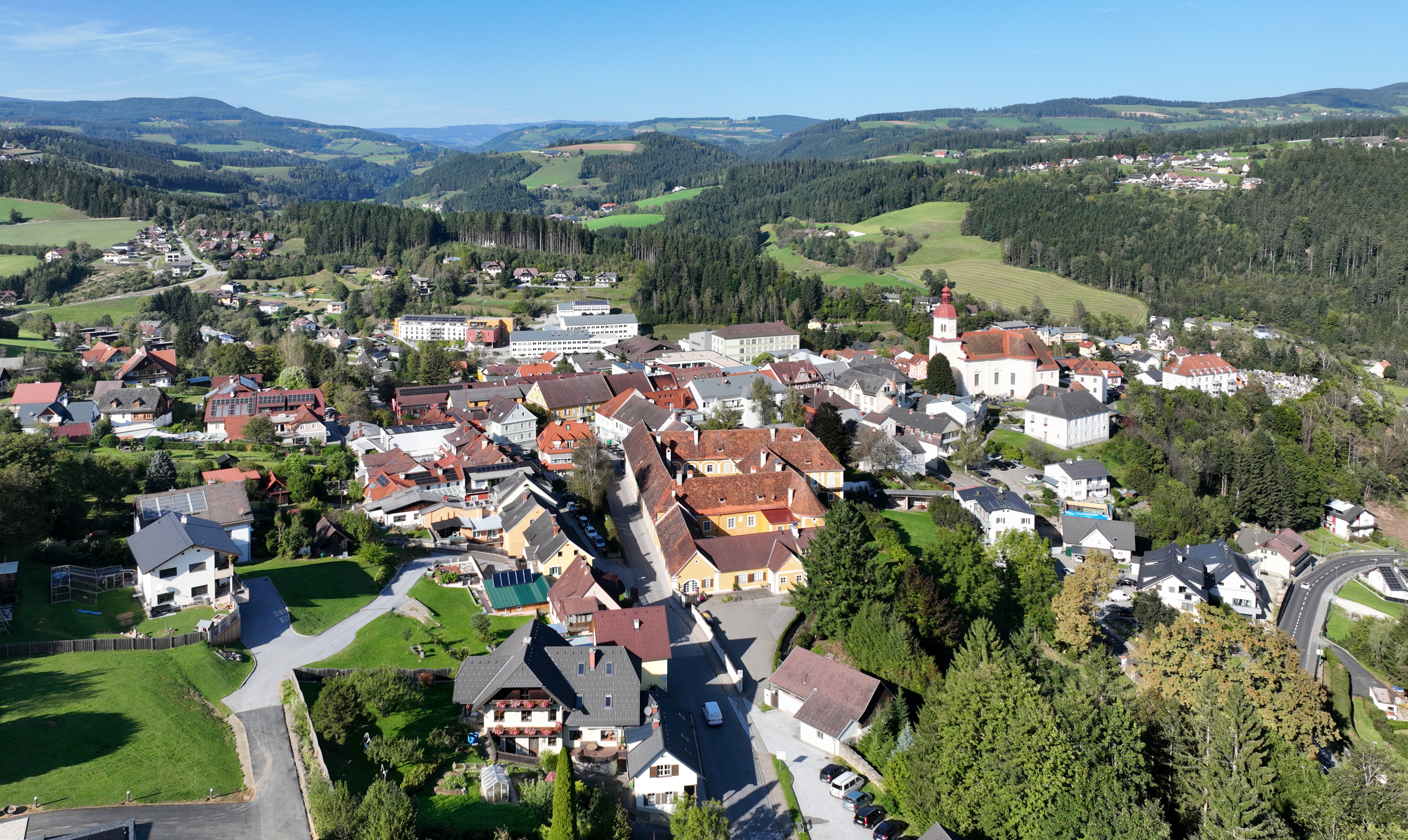
- Aerial view of Birkfeld

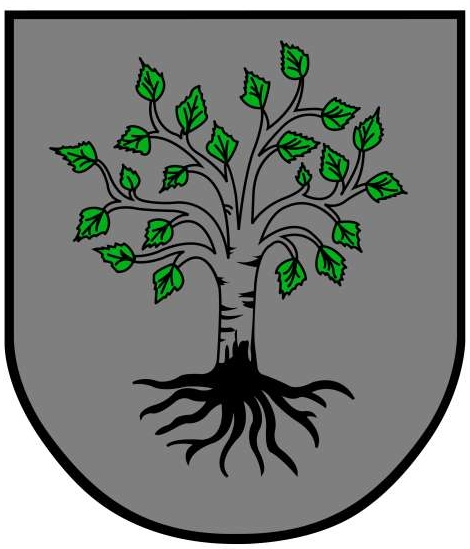
- Coat of arms

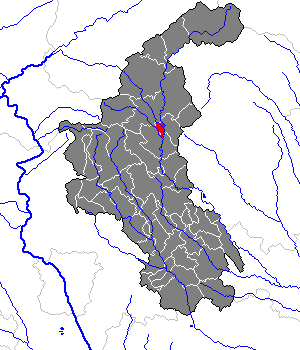
- Location within Weiz district

- Location within Austria
- Coordinates: 47°21′00″N 15°40′00″E
- Country: Austria
- State: Styria
- District: Weiz

Government
  - Mayor: Franz Derler (ÖVP)

Area
  - Total: 89.67 km^{2} (34.62 sq mi)
- Elevation: 639 m (2,096 ft)

Population (2018-01-01)
  - Total: 4,992
  - Density: 55.67/km^{2} (144.2/sq mi)
- Time zone: UTC+1 (CET)
  - Summer (DST): UTC+2 (CEST)
- Postal code: 8190
- Area code: 03174
- Vehicle registration: WZ
- Website: www.birkfeld.at

Birkfeld is a market town in the district of Weiz in the Austrian state of Styria.

== Geography ==
It lies in the valley of the Feistritz river.
