= Pavel Vieira =

Bissau-Guinean footballer (born 1992)

Personal information
- Full name: Pavel Pinto Vieira
- Date of birth: 15 February 1992 (age 34)
- Place of birth: Bissau, Guinea-Bissau
- Height: 1.84 m (6 ft 0 in)
- Position: Midfielder

Youth career
- 2006–2007: Mem Martins
- 2008–2009: Estoril Praia
- 2009–2010: Farense
- 2010–2011: Olhanense

Senior career*
Years	Team	Apps	(Gls)
2010–2011	Olhanense	1	(0)
2011–2012	Moura	11	(3)
2012–2013	At. Reguengos	2	(1)
2013–2014	Prescot Cables	16	(1)
2014	Cultural Leonesa	3	(0)
2015	Roccella		
2015–2016	Nelson		
2016–2017	Bangor City	5	(0)
2017–2019	Airbus UK Brougton	20	(5)
2019–2020	Bangor City	19	(2)
2020	Aberystwyth Town	5	(0)
2020	Prestatyn Town	0	(0)
2021–2022	Cefn Druids	3	(0)

International career
2011	Guinea-Bissau	1	(0)
- * Club domestic league appearances and goals as of 20:08, 19 May 2020 (UTC)

Pavel Pinto Vieira (born 15 February 1992) is a retired Bissau-Guinean footballer.

After making is appearance in the Primeira Liga for Olhanense in May 2011, he spent the rest of his career in the lower leagues of Portugal, England, Italy and Wales. He earned one international cap for Guinea-Bissau in August 2011

== Career ==
Born in Guinea-Bissau, Vieira spent his youth career in Portugal, with Mem Martins F.C., G.D. Estoril Praia, S.C. Farense and S.C. Olhanense. He made his professional debut in his only game for the last of those teams, on 14 May 2011 in the last game of the Primeira Liga season, coming on as a last-minute substitute for Jean Paul Yontcha in a 2–2 home draw with Rio Ave FC. On 10 August 2011 he made his only appearance for the Guinea-Bissau national team, a 4–1 friendly win over Equatorial Guinea at the Estádio do Restelo in Lisbon.

Vieira subsequently played in the third and fourth tiers of Portuguese football for several clubs. He also played at a similar level for Prescot Cables in England, Cultural y Deportiva Leonesa in Spain and AS Roccella in Italy. In August 2015 he played three games for Nelson – two in the league and a cup match.

On 31 August 2016, the last day of the transfer window, Vieira joined Bangor City in the Welsh Premier League. The following July, he dropped one level on the Welsh football league system to Airbus UK Broughton of the Cymru Alliance.

Vieira returned to Bangor in May 2019, with the club now in the second-tier Cymru North. On 27 September, he was one of three players sent off in a 7–0 loss at Prestatyn Town. On 8 January 2020, Viera joined Cymru Premier side Aberystwyth Town.

== Personal life ==
On 30 March 2018, Vieira took a video recording of himself being racially abused on a bus in Kirkdale, Liverpool. The following month, 52-year-old Kevin Brophy pleaded guilty to a racially aggravated public order offence, having already a 2015 conviction for the same crime. He was given an eight-week prison sentence suspended for a year, and fined £115 victim surcharge, £100 in compensation to Vieira and £85 in court costs.
