= István Berde =

Romanian footballer

Personal information
- Full name: István Berde
- Date of birth: 14 December 1988 (age 37)
- Place of birth: Sfântu Gheorghe, Romania
- Height: 1.89 m (6 ft 2 in)
- Position: Midfielder

Youth career
- 2005–2007: Győr

Senior career*
Years	Team	Apps	(Gls)
2005–2012	Győr	3	(0)
2007–2012	→ Győr II	78	(15)
2012	Gyirmót	6	(0)
2012	BKV Előre	5	(1)
2013	Veszprém	9	(0)
2015–2016	Szeged	37	(3)
2016–2018	Siófok	39	(1)
2018–2019	FK Csíkszereda	4	(0)
Total		181	(20)
- * Club domestic league appearances and goals as of 9 December 2019

István Berde (born 14 December 1988) is a Romanian professional footballer who plays as a midfielder. From 2013 to 2015, he spent time in Romania. He did not play any professional football during this time.

== Honours ==
FK Csíkszereda

- Liga III: 2018–19
