= Márk Petneházi =

Hungarian footballer

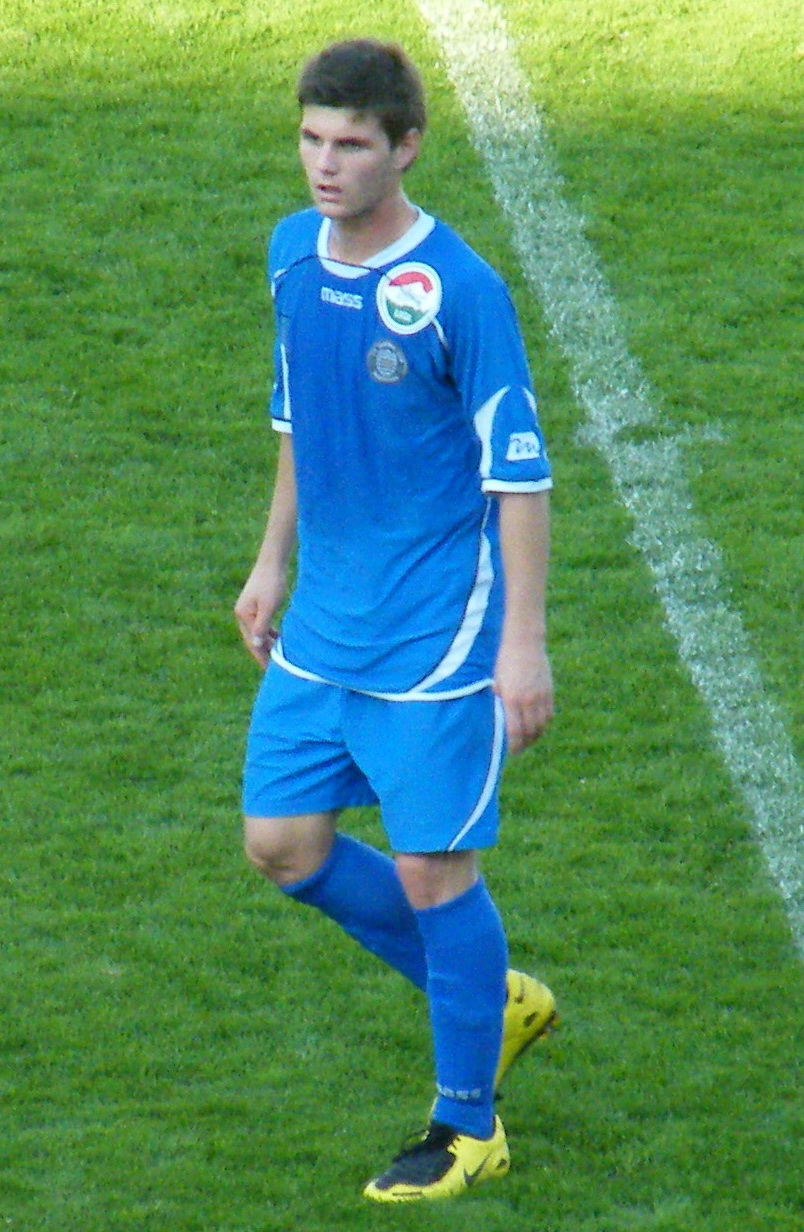
- Petneházi in 2008

Personal information
- Full name: Márk Petneházi
- Date of birth: 4 October 1988 (age 38)
- Place of birth: Hódmezővásárhely, Hungary
- Height: 1.76 m (5 ft 9 in)
- Position: Midfielder

Team information
- Current team: Budaörs
- Number: 8

Youth career
- 2003–2006: Grund
- 2004–2005: → MAC (loan)
- 2006–2007: Plymouth

Senior career*
Years	Team	Apps	(Gls)
2007–2008	Orosháza	29	(10)
2008–2011	Zalaegerszeg	17	(0)
2010	→ Orosháza (loan)	24	(5)
2011–2012	Orosháza	29	(6)
2012–2013	Nyíregyháza	13	(3)
2013–2014	Mezőkövesd	20	(7)
2014–2016	Dunaújváros	54	(7)
2016	Ajka	13	(0)
2016–2019	Siófok	78	(22)
2019–2020	III. Kerület	33	(5)
2020–	Budaörs	55	(11)
- * Club domestic league appearances and goals as of 19:50, 3 February 2022 (UTC)

Márk Petneházi (born 4 October 1988 in Hódmezővásárhely) is a Hungarian football player who currently plays for Budaörsi SC.
