= Gergely Gyürki =

Hungarian football manager (born 1993)

- Gyürki managing Mosonmagyaróvár in 2026

Personal information
- Date of birth: 3 October 1993 (age 33)
- Place of birth: Budapest, Hungary
- Height: 1.73 m (5 ft 8 in)
- Position: Midfielder

Team information
- Current team: Mosonmagyaróvár (manager)

Senior career*
Years	Team	Apps	(Gls)
–2012	Ferencváros	1	(0)
2012–2013	Pénzügyőr		
2013–2014	Tatabánya	13	(0)
2014–2015	Pénzügyőr		
2016	Haladás	3	(0)
2016–2018	Soproni VSE	65	(9)
2018	Ceglédi VSE	4	(0)
2019	Vác	14	(1)
2019–2023	Tatabánya	86	(36)

International career
- Kárpátalja

Managerial career
- 2022–2025: Tatabánya
- 2025–: Mosonmagyaróvár
- * Club domestic league appearances and goals

Gergely Gyürki (born 3 October 1993) is a Hungarian professional football manager and former player, who is currently the manager of Nemzeti Bajnokság III club Mosonmagyaróvár.

== Early life ==
Gyürki attended the Hungarian University of Physical Education and Sports Sciences.

== Club career ==
In 2014, Gyürki signed for Hungarian side Pénzügyőr, where he was regarded as an important played for the club and helped them win the league and Budapest Cup. In 2018, he signed for Hungarian side Ceglédi VSE.

== International career ==
Gyürki played for the Kárpátalja football team, helping the team win the 2018 CONIFA World Football Cup.

== Style of play ==
Gyürki mainly operates as a midfielder or striker and is right-footed.

== Managerial career ==
Gyürki obtained a UEFA B License. In 2022, Gyürki was appointed manager of Hungarian side Tatabánya. He was regarded to have been one of the youngest managers in Hungarian professional football at the time and was regarded to have performed well with the club. On 17 February 2025, Gyürki was sacked after a 4–1 home defeat against Honvéd with Attila Dragóner, executive director.

On 21 June 2025, he was appointed as the manager of the promotion play-offs losing Nemzeti Bajnokság III Northwest group winning club Mosonmagyaróvár.

== Personal life ==
Gyürki has enjoyed fishing as a hobby. He has been a supporter of the Hungary national football team and Portugal national football team.
