= Andriy Yefremov =

Ukrainian footballer

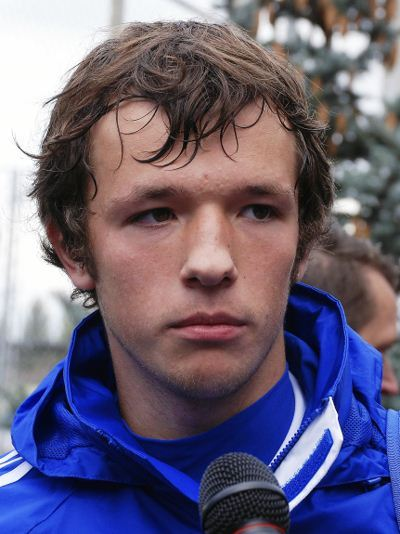

Personal information
- Full name: Andriy Yuriyovych Yefremov
- Date of birth: 14 February 1993 (age 33)
- Place of birth: Kyiv, Ukraine
- Height: 1.80 m (5 ft 11 in)
- Position: Midfielder

Team information
- Current team: Chaika Petropavlivska Borshchahivka
- Number: 22

Youth career
- 2011–2013: Dynamo Kyiv
- 2013–2014: UkrAhroKom Holovkivka
- 2014: Chaika Kyiv-Sviatoshyn Raion

Senior career*
Years	Team	Apps	(Gls)
2014–2015	Szombathelyi Haladás	3	(0)
2015	→ Gabčíkovo	0	(0)
2018	Hirnyk-Sport Horishni Plavni	26	(0)
2019–	Chaika Petropavlivska Borshchahivka	0	(0)

International career^{‡}
2008–2010	Ukraine U16	10	(2)
2010–2012	Ukraine U18	7	(1)
2012	Ukraine U19	1	(0)
- * Club domestic league appearances and goals as of 10 April 2019 ‡ National team caps and goals as of 18 March 2018

Andriy Yuriyovych Yefremov (Ukrainian: Андрій Юрійович Єфремов; born 14 February 1993) is a Ukrainian football player who plays for Chaika Petropavlivska Borshchahivka.

== Club statistics ==
Club	Season	League		Cup		League Cup		Europe		Total	
Club	Season	Apps	Goals	Apps	Goals	Apps	Goals	Apps	Goals	Apps	Goals
Chaika
Chaika	2014–15	0	0	2	0	0	0	0	0	2	0
Chaika	Total	0	0	2	0	0	0	0	0	0	0
Szombathely
Szombathely	2014–15	1	0	0	0	0	0	0	0	1	0
Szombathely	Total	1	0	0	0	0	0	0	0	1	0
Career Total		1	0	2	0	0	0	0	0	3	0

Updated to games played as of 19 October 2014.
