= Balázs Zamostny =

Hungarian footballer

Personal information
- Date of birth: 31 January 1992 (age 34)
- Place of birth: Pécs, Hungary
- Height: 1.89 m (6 ft 2 in)
- Position: Forward

Team information
- Current team: Kozármisleny
- Number: 70

Youth career
- 2004–2007: Pécs
- 2007–2008: MTK

Senior career*
Years	Team	Apps	(Gls)
2008–2011	Pécs	4	(0)
2011–2015	Újpest	17	(1)
2012–2013	→ Siófok (loan)	11	(2)
2013–2014	→ Vasas (loan)	13	(0)
2014	→ Haladás (loan)	7	(0)
2015–2016	Sopron	45	(12)
2016–2018	Győr	65	(20)
2018–2020	Siófok	41	(5)
2020–2021	Ajka	25	(5)
2021–2022	Nyíregyháza	53	(9)
2022–2024	Tiszakécske	69	(19)
2024–2025	BVSC	14	(0)
2025–	Kozármisleny	20	(4)

International career
2012	Hungary U-20	2	(1)
2012–2013	Hungary U-21	2	(1)
- * Club domestic league appearances and goals as of 31 May 2026

Balázs Zamostny (born 31 January 1992) is a Hungarian forward who plays for Kozármisleny.

== Club career ==
On 28 June 2022, Zamostny moved to Tiszakécske.

== Career statistics ==
As of 9 August 2020.

Appearances and goals by club, season and competition
Club	Season	League			Cup		Continental		Other		Total	
Club	Season	Division	Apps	Goals	Apps	Goals	Apps	Goals	Apps	Goals	Apps	Goals
Pécs	2010–11	Nemzeti Bajnokság II	4	0	2	0	—		—		6	0
Pécs	Total		4	0	2	0	0	0	0	0	6	0
Újpest II	2010–11	Nemzeti Bajnokság II	12	3	0	0	—		—		12	3
Újpest II	2011–12	Nemzeti Bajnokság II	12	2	0	0	—		—		12	2
Újpest II	2012–13	Nemzeti Bajnokság II	15	6	0	0	—		—		15	6
Újpest II	Total		39	11	0	0	0	0	0	0	39	11
Újpest	2011–12	Nemzeti Bajnokság I	6	0	2	0	—		3	0	11	0
Újpest	2012–13	Nemzeti Bajnokság I	4	1	0	0	—		—		4	1
Újpest	2013–14	Nemzeti Bajnokság I	7	0	4	2	—		—		11	2
Újpest	Total		17	1	6	2	0	0	3	0	26	3
Siófok	2012–13	Nemzeti Bajnokság I	11	2	3	0	—		3	1	17	3
Siófok	2018–19	Nemzeti Bajnokság II	28	5	3	0	—		—		31	5
Siófok	2019–20	Nemzeti Bajnokság II	13	0	3	3	—		—		16	3
Siófok	Total		52	7	9	3	0	0	3	1	64	11
Vasas	2013–14	Nemzeti Bajnokság II	13	0	1	0	—		3	0	17	0
Vasas	Total		13	0	1	0	0	0	3	0	17	0
Haladás	2014–15	Nemzeti Bajnokság I	7	0	3	3	—		8	3	18	6
Haladás	Total		7	0	3	3	0	0	8	3	18	6
Sopron	2014–15	Nemzeti Bajnokság II	14	4	0	0	—		—		14	4
Sopron	2015–16	Nemzeti Bajnokság II	30	8	4	5	—		—		34	13
Sopron	2016–17	Nemzeti Bajnokság II	1	0	0	0	—		—		1	0
Sopron	Total		45	12	4	5	0	0	0	0	49	17
Győr	2016–17	Nemzeti Bajnokság III	29	13	1	0	—		—		30	13
Győr	2017–18	Nemzeti Bajnokság II	36	7	3	0	—		—		39	7
Győr	Total		65	20	4	0	0	0	0	0	69	20
Ajka	2019–20	Nemzeti Bajnokság II	6	2	0	0	—		—		6	2
Ajka	2020–21	Nemzeti Bajnokság II	3	1	0	0	—		—		3	1
Ajka	Total		9	3	0	0	0	0	0	0	9	3
Career total			251	54	29	13	0	0	17	4	297	71

== Honours ==
Újpest

- Hungarian Cup (1): 2013–14
