= Martin Zsirai =

Hungarian footballer

Personal information
- Date of birth: 19 March 1994 (age 32)
- Place of birth: Pápa, Hungary
- Height: 1.83 m (6 ft 0 in)
- Position: Defender

Team information
- Current team: Pápa

Youth career
- 2004–2008: Pápa
- 2008–2012: Haladás

Senior career*
Years	Team	Apps	(Gls)
2012–2014	Haladás II	33	(1)
2014–2016	Haladás	3	(0)
2015	→ Ajka (loan)	17	(0)
2016–2019	Mosonmagyaróvár	93	(9)
2019–2021	Pápa	30	(0)
2021	Kaposvár	12	(0)
2021–	Pápa	31	(3)

International career
2010–2011	Hungary U-17		
2012–2013	Hungary U-19		
- * Club domestic league appearances and goals as of 8 May 2022

Martin Zsirai (born 19 March 1994) is a Hungarian football player who plays for Pápa.

== Career statistics ==
Appearances and goals by club, season and competition
Club	Season	League			Cup		League Cup		Europe		Total	
Club	Season	Division	Apps	Goals	Apps	Goals	Apps	Goals	Apps	Goals	Apps	Goals
Haladás II
Haladás II	2012–13	Nemzeti Bajnokság I	19	1	0	0	0	0	0	0	19	1
Haladás II	2013–14	Nemzeti Bajnokság I	14	0	0	0	0	0	0	0	14	0
Haladás II	Total		33	1	0	0	0	0	0	0	33	1
Haladás
Haladás	2012–13	Nemzeti Bajnokság I	0	0	0	0	1	0	0	0	1	0
Haladás	2013–14	Nemzeti Bajnokság I	1	0	0	0	4	0	0	0	5	0
Haladás	2014–15	Nemzeti Bajnokság I	2	0	0	0	6	0	0	0	8	0
Haladás	Total		3	0	0	0	11	0	0	0	14	0
Ajka
Ajka	2014–15	Nemzeti Bajnokság II	7	0	0	0	2	0	0	0	9	0
Ajka	2015–16	Nemzeti Bajnokság II	10	0	2	0	0	0	0	0	12	0
Ajka	Total		17	0	2	0	2	0	0	0	21	0
Career total			53	1	2	0	13	0	0	0	68	1

Updated to games played as of 22 January 2016.
