= 2006–07 FC Sopron season =

Sopron
2006–07 season
- Owner: Marius Vizer
- Manager: László Vass (caretaker, until 19 June 2006); Tibor Selymes (from 19 June until 9 August); Roberto Landi (from 9 August to 14 September); Tibor Selymes (from 14 September to 27 November); Aurél Csertői (from 27 November to 19 March 2007); Dario Bonetti (from 19 March)
- Stadium: Káposztás utcai Stadion
- Nemzeti Bajnokság I: 10th
- Magyar Kupa: Round of 16
- UEFA Intertoto Cup: Second round
- Highest home attendance: 3,500 (multiple Nemzeti Bajnokság I matches)
- Lowest home attendance: 600 v Diósgyőr (8 November 2006, Magyar Kupa)
- Average home league attendance: 2,335
- Biggest win: 6–1 v Bonyhád (Away, 18 October 2006, Magyar Kupa)
- Biggest defeat: 1–6 v Debrecen (Home, 25 November 2006, Nemzeti Bajnokság I)

The 2006–07 season was Football Club Sopron's 7th competitive season, 7th consecutive season in the Nemzeti Bajnokság I and 64th season in existence as a football club. In addition to the domestic league, Sopron participated in that season's editions of the Magyar Kupa and the UEFA Intertoto Cup.

== Squad ==
Squad at end of season

Note: Flags indicate national team as defined under FIFA eligibility rules; some limited exceptions apply. Players may hold more than one non-FIFA nationality.

| No. | Pos. | Nation | Player |
|---|---|---|---|
| 1 | GK | HUN | Márk Heinrich |
| 3 | DF | ROU | Marius Radu |
| 5 | DF | ROU | Ion Ibric |
| 6 | FW | HUN | István Sira |
| 7 | MF | HUN | András Horváth |
| 8 | FW | HUN | Róbert Feczesin |
| 9 | FW | ROU | Cristian Cigan |
| 10 | MF | BUL | Georgi Korudzhiev |
| 12 | GK | HUN | Tamás Takács |
| 13 | DF | HUN | Pál Lázár |
| 14 | MF | ROU | Cristian Lucian Munteanu |
| 17 | MF | HUN | Zoltán Csontos |
| 18 | FW | HUN | Bence Faragó |

| No. | Pos. | Nation | Player |
|---|---|---|---|
| 20 | FW | HUN | József Magasföldi |
| 21 | DF | ROU | Laurențiu Rus |
| 22 | MF | BRA | Fábio Kolling |
| 23 | FW | HUN | Botond Birtalan |
| 24 | DF | ROU | Alexandru Dragomir |
| 27 | FW | HUN | Gábor Demjén |
| 28 | MF | HUN | Zoltán Varga |
| 29 | DF | HUN | Sándor Csikós |
| 30 | MF | GHA | Felix Ankamah |
| 31 | MF | HUN | Roland Dancs |
| 33 | MF | HUN | Tamás Sifter |
| 38 | GK | GHA | William Amamoo |

== Competitions ==
=== Overview ===
| Competition | First match | Last match | Starting round | Final position | Record | | | | | | | |
| Competition | First match | Last match | Starting round | Final position | Pld | W | D | L | GF | GA | GD | Win % |
|---|---|---|---|---|---|---|---|---|---|---|---|---|
| Nemzeti Bajnokság I | 30 July 2006 | 26 May 2007 | Matchday 1 | 10th | 30 | 11 | 4 | 15 | 33 | 46 | −13 | 36.67 |
| Magyar Kupa | 20 September 2006 | 22 November 2006 | Third round | Round of 16 | 4 | 2 | 0 | 2 | 9 | 7 | +2 | 50.00 |
| UEFA Intertoto Cup | 1 July 2006 | 8 July 2006 | Second round | Second round | 2 | 0 | 1 | 1 | 3 | 4 | −1 | 0.00 |
| Total | | | | | 36 | 13 | 5 | 18 | 45 | 57 | −12 | 36.11 |

Source: Competitions

=== Nemzeti Bajnokság I ===
==== League table ====
| Pos | Team | Pld | W | D | L | GF | GA | GD | Pts | Qualification or relegation |
|---|---|---|---|---|---|---|---|---|---|---|
| 8 | Honvéd | 30 | 11 | 8 | 11 | 48 | 43 | +5 | 41 | Qualification for the UEFA Cup first qualifying round (Note: Honvéd qualified for the UEFA Cup first qualifying round as the 2006–07 Magyar Kupa winners.) |
| 9 | Diósgyőr | 30 | 11 | 5 | 14 | 40 | 52 | −12 | 38 | |
| 10 | Sopron | 30 | 11 | 4 | 15 | 33 | 46 | −13 | 37 | |
| 11 | Paks | 30 | 10 | 7 | 13 | 34 | 38 | −4 | 37 | |
| 12 | Tatabánya | 30 | 11 | 3 | 16 | 46 | 58 | −12 | 36 | |

Source: soccerway.com

==== Results summary ====
| Overall | | | | | | | | Home | | | | | | Away | | | | | |
| Pld | W | D | L | GF | GA | GD | Pts | W | D | L | GF | GA | GD | W | D | L | GF | GA | GD |
|---|---|---|---|---|---|---|---|---|---|---|---|---|---|---|---|---|---|---|---|
| 30 | 11 | 4 | 15 | 33 | 46 | −13 | 37 | 7 | 1 | 7 | 18 | 24 | −6 | 4 | 3 | 8 | 15 | 22 | −7 |

Source: Hungarian Football Federation

==== Results by round ====
| Round | 1 | 2 | 3 | 4 | 5 | 6 | 7 | 8 | 9 | 10 | 11 | 12 | 13 | 14 | 15 | 16 | 17 | 18 | 19 | 20 | 21 | 22 | 23 | 24 | 25 | 26 | 27 | 28 | 29 | 30 |
|---|---|---|---|---|---|---|---|---|---|---|---|---|---|---|---|---|---|---|---|---|---|---|---|---|---|---|---|---|---|---|
| Ground | A | H | A | H | A | H | A | H | A | A | H | A | H | A | H | H | A | H | A | H | A | H | A | H | H | A | H | A | H | A |
| Result | L | W | L | W | L | L | W | L | L | D | L | D | W | W | L | W | L | L | W | L | L | L | W | D | W | L | W | D | W | L |
| Position | 14 | 10 | 11 | 8 | 10 | 12 | 9 | 10 | 11 | 13 | 14 | 14 | 13 | 12 | 12 | 10 | 11 | 11 | 10 | 13 | 14 | 15 | 14 | 14 | 11 | 13 | 11 | 10 | 10 | 10 |
| Points | 0 | 3 | 3 | 6 | 6 | 6 | 9 | 9 | 9 | 10 | 10 | 11 | 14 | 17 | 17 | 20 | 20 | 20 | 23 | 23 | 23 | 23 | 26 | 27 | 30 | 30 | 33 | 34 | 37 | 37 |

Source: Matches
A = Away; H = Home; W = Win; D = Draw; L = Loss

==== Matches ====
| 30 July 2006 1 | Tatabánya | 2–0 | Sopron | Tatabánya |
| 18:00 CEST (UTC+2) | Filó (yellow card) 21'; Jezdimirović (yellow card) 32'; Márkus 71', 82' | Report | Feczesin (yellow card) 52'; Sira (yellow card) 53'; Homei (red card) 84' | Stadium: Városi Stadion; Attendance: 3,000; Referee: Mihály Fábián; Assistant referees: Gyula Ortó, Oszkár Lémon; Fourth official: Gábor Péter Kovács |

| 5 August 2006 2 | Sopron | 2–1 | Fehérvár | Sopron |
| 20:00 CEST (UTC+2) | Munteanu (yellow card) 6'; Bagoly (red card) 12'; A. Horváth I 45', 90+3', (yellow card) 83' | Report | Koller (yellow card) 33'; Božić (yellow card) 53'; G. Horváth II 78' | Stadium: Káposztás utcai Stadion; Attendance: 3,200; Referee: István Vad; Assistant referees: Zoltán Kovács, Szabolcs Deutsch; Fourth official: Péter Herbály |

| 19 August 2006 3 | MTK | 4–1 | Sopron | Budapest |
| 19:00 CEST (UTC+2) | Lambulić (yellow card) 20'; Hrepka 27', 31'; Kanta 47'; K. Németh 88' | Report | Radu 8'; Ibric (yellow card) 49'; A. Horváth I (yellow card) 85' | Stadium: Hidegkuti Nándor Stadion; Attendance: 2,000; Referee: Sándor Andó-Szabó; Assistant referees: Zsolt Szpisják, Jénos Medovarszki; Fourth official: Attila Hegedűs |

| 26 August 2006 4 | Sopron | 1–0 | Diósgyőr | Sopron |
| 19:00 CEST (UTC+2) | Demjén (yellow card) 19'; Magasföldi (yellow card) 32', (goal) 58'; Munteanu (yellow card) 86' | Report | Mogyorósi (yellow card) 17' | Stadium: Káposztás utcai Stadion; Attendance: 3,100; Referee: Ferenc Bede; Assistant referees: Tibor Vámos, Vencel Tóth II; Fourth official: Gergely Sulyok |

| 10 September 2006 5 | Győr | 2–0 | Sopron | Tatabánya (Note: The match was played at the Városi Stadion in Tatabánya, instead of Győr regular stadium, the Stadion ETO in Győr, which was demolished to make way to the newly built ETO Park.) |
| 16:30 CEST (UTC+2) | Zs. Szabó 25'; Nyári (yellow card) 68', (goal) 90'; G. Varga (yellow card) 71' | Report | Trkulja (yellow card) 43'; A. Horváth I (yellow card) 86'; Magasföldi (yellow card) 90+1' | Stadium: Városi Stadion; Attendance: 2,200; Referee: Sándor Gergely; Assistant referees: Szabolcs Deutsch, Zsolt Szalai; Fourth official: Nortbert Kiss |

| 18 September 2006 6 | Sopron | 0–2 | Újpest | Sopron |
| 18:00 CEST (UTC+2) | Ibric (yellow card) 79' | Report | Rajczi (yellow card) 11'; Tisza 75', 80' | Stadium: Káposztás utcai Stadion; Attendance: 2,000; Referee: Péter Solymosi; Assistant referees: Balázs Huszár, Zoltán Kovács; Fourth official: Krisztián Király |

| 23 September 2006 7 | Rákospalota | 1–3 | Sopron | Budapest |
| 16:00 CEST (UTC+2) | G. Nagy I (yellow card) 7' (yellow-red card) 81'; Pusztai (yellow card) 39'; Somorjai 54'; Bárányos (yellow card) 65' | Report | Feczesin 13', 23', 41'; Radu (yellow card) 71' | Stadium: Budai II. László Stadion; Attendance: 400; Referee: István Mészáros; Assistant referees: Attila Kelemen, László Viszokai; Fourth official: Tamás Bodac |

| 2 October 2006 8 | Sopron | 1–2 | Zalaegerszeg | Sopron |
| 18:00 CEST (UTC+2) | Lekić (yellow card) 17'; Feczesin 82' | Report | J. Sebők 33'; L. Nagy (yellow card) 38'; V. Sebők (yellow card) 51'; Botiș 84' | Stadium: Káposztás utcai Stadion; Attendance: 2,800; Referee: János Megyebíró; Assistant referees: István Albert, János Medovarszki; Fourth official: Attila Hegedűs |

| 14 October 2006 9 | Honvéd | 2–0 | Sopron | Budapest (Note: The match was played at the Béke téri Stadion in Budapest, instead of Honvéd regular stadium, the Bozsik József Stadion in Budapest, due to the renovation work.) |
| 18:00 CEST (UTC+2) | Hercegfalvi 42'; László 45'; Budovinszky (red card) 73' | Report | Ianc (yellow card) 21'; Munteanu (yellow card) 45'; Magasföldi (yellow card) 84' | Stadium: Béke téri Stadion; Attendance: 900; Referee: Tamás Arany; Assistant referees: Dr. Péter Hegyi, Zoltán Szalai; Fourth official: Gergely Sulyok |

| 21 October 2006 10 | Pécs | 0–0 | Sopron | Pécs |
| 15:00 CEST (UTC+2) | Balaskó (yellow card) 37'; Pavičević (yellow card) 52' | Report | Demjén (yellow card) 37'; Sifter (yellow card) 43' | Stadium: Stadion PMFC; Attendance: 1,000; Referee: Károly Török; Assistant referees: Ferenc Székely, Zsolt Márton; Fourth official: Gábor Péter Kovács |

| 28 October 2006 11 | Sopron | 1–3 | Paks | Sopron |
| 18:00 CEST (UTC+2) | Bagoly (yellow card) 24', (goal) 45'; Demjén (yellow card) 40'; A. Horváth I (red card) 78' | Report | Kóczián 25'; Belényesi 30'; Tamási (yellow card) 43'; P. Tóth II (yellow card) 54'; L. Varga 79' | Stadium: Káposztás utcai Stadion; Attendance: 2,425; Referee: Tamás Bognár; Assistant referees: Balázs Huszár, Gábor Takács; Fourth official: Csaba Pintér |

| 4 November 2006 12 | Vasas | 0–0 | Sopron | Budapest |
| 17:00 CET (UTC+1) | Z. Pintér (yellow card) 52' | Report | Ankamah (yellow card) 56'; Magasföldi (yellow card) 81' | Stadium: Illovszky Rudolf Stadion; Attendance: 600; Referee: Krisztián Pánczél; Assistant referees: Tibor Vígh, Tamás Márkus; Fourth official: Róbert Nagy |

| 11 November 2006 13 | Sopron | 1–0 | Kaposvár | Sopron |
| 17:00 CET (UTC+1) | A. Horváth I (yellow card) 34'; Feczesin 38'; Demjén (yellow card) 59'; Bagoly (yellow card) 89' | Report | Andruskó (yellow card) 82'; Oláh (red card) 87' | Stadium: Káposztás utcai Stadion; Attendance: 1,500; Referee: Sándor Gergely; Assistant referees: Szabolcs Deutsch, Zsolt Szalai; Fourth official: Norbert Kiss |

| 18 November 2006 14 | Dunakanyar-Vác | 1–2 | Sopron | Vác |
| 16:00 CET (UTC+1) | T. Kulcsár 40'; Dudás (yellow card) 63'; Páles (red card) 69'; Udvari (yellow card) 73'; Sinkó (yellow card) 90+2' | Report | Munteanu (yellow card) 22'; Sifter (yellow card) 49'; Feczesin 60'; Bagoly (red card) 68'; Demjén 74' | Stadium: Ligeti Stadion; Attendance: 1,000; Referee: Mihály Fábián; Assistant referees: Dr. Zsolt Varga, Gyula Ortó; Fourth official: Gergő Király |

| 25 November 2006 15 | Sopron | 1–6 | Debrecen | Sopron |
| 16:00 CET (UTC+1) | Birtalan 6'; Feczesin (yellow card) 42'; Demjén (yellow card) 49'; Radu (yellow card) 63'; Munteanu (yellow card) 67' | Report | Z. Kiss 17', (yellow card) 43'; Halmosi 23'; Szatmári (yellow card) 40'; Leandro 68'; Sidibe 75', 89'; Zsolnai 84' | Stadium: Káposztás utcai Stadion; Attendance: 1,500; Referee: Zsolt Szabó; Assistant referees: Róbert Kispál, Balázs Huszár; Fourth official: Gábor Oláh |

| 2 December 2006 16 | Sopron | 1–0 | Tatabánya | Sopron |
| 15:00 CET (UTC+1) | Feczesin 48' (pen.); T. Szabó (yellow card) 90' | Report | Bakrač (yellow card) 15' | Stadium: Káposztás utcai Stadion; Attendance: 1,000; Referee: Szabolcs Szilasi; Assistant referees: Oszkár Lémon, Gábor Takács; Fourth official: Krisztián Király |

| 10 December 2006 17 | Fehérvár | 3–1 | Sopron | Székesfehérvár |
| 15:00 CET (UTC+1) | Sitku 10'; Božić 18'; Terjék 55', (yellow card) 55'; D. Nagy (yellow card) 90'; Kocsis (yellow card) 90+2' | Report | T. Szabó (yellow card) 45'; Feczesin 78' | Stadium: Sóstói Stadion; Attendance: 1,500; Referee: Tamás Bognár; Assistant referees: Zoltán Kis, Zsolt Szalai; Fourth official: Zsolt Kovács |

| 24 February 2007 18 | Sopron | 0–3 | MTK | Sopron |
| 15:00 CET (UTC+1) | Cigan (yellow card) 33'; A. Horváth I (yellow card) 39'; Magasföldi (yellow card) 61'; Demjén (yellow card) 68'; Munteanu (yellow card) 81' | Report | Hrepka 27'; K. Németh 38', 59'; Pál (yellow card) 45' | Stadium: Káposztás utcai Stadion; Attendance: 1,500; Referee: Viktor Kassai; Assistant referees: Gábor Erős, Tibor Vámos; Fourth official: József Erdős |

| 3 March 2007 19 | Diósgyőr | 0–2 | Sopron | Miskolc |
| 16:00 CET (UTC+1) | | Report | Ibric (yellow card) 38'; Rus (yellow card) 51'; Feczesin 63'; Cigan 88' | Stadium: Diósgyőri Stadion; Attendance: 5,000; Referee: Csaba Imre Sápi; Assistant referees: Gyula Fehér, Tibor Vígh; Fourth official: Péter Berettyán |

| 10 March 2007 20 | Sopron | 0–1 | Győr | Sopron |
| 16:00 CET (UTC+1) | | Report | Bajzát 82' | Stadium: Káposztás utcai Stadion; Attendance: 3,500; Referee: Tamás Arany; Assistant referees: Zoltán Tompos, Gábor Takács; Fourth official: J. Zoltán Kovács |

| 17 March 2007 21 | Újpest | 1–0 | Sopron | Budapest |
| 16:00 CET (UTC+1) | Tisza 28' (pen.) | Report | Dragomir (yellow card) 22'; A. Horváth I (red card) 28'; Radu (yellow card) 29'; Cigan (yellow card) 48'; Dancs (yellow card) 90+1' | Stadium: Szusza Ferenc Stadion; Attendance: 3,000; Referee: István Vad; Assistant referees: Vencel Tóth II, Gyula Ortó; Fourth official: Róbert Nagy |

| 31 March 2007 22 | Sopron | 2–3 | Rákospalota | Sopron |
| 16:00 CEST (UTC+2) | Ankamah (red card) 18'; Sira 21'; Magasföldi 37', (yellow card) 63'; Ibric (yellow card) 60' | Report | Somorjai 8'; Kapcsos (red card) 18'; Cseri (yellow card) 25'; Regedei 42'; Torma 59' (pen.); Polonkai (yellow card) 90' | Stadium: Káposztás utcai Stadion; Attendance: 2,500; Referee: Tamás Bognár; Assistant referees: Zoltán Szalai, György Ring; Fourth official: Ádám Németh |

| 7 April 2007 23 | Zalaegerszeg | 1–3 | Sopron | Zalaegerszeg |
| 17:00 CEST (UTC+2) | Lipčák (yellow card) 30'; Lekić 37' | Report | Feczesin 17' (pen.), 31' (pen.); Lázár (yellow card) 61'; Rus (yellow card) 75'; Cigan 76' | Stadium: ZTE Arena; Attendance: 5,500; Referee: Tamás Arany; Assistant referees: Zoltán Tompos, Balázs Farkas; Fourth official: Csaba Ursprung |

| 14 April 2007 24 | Sopron | 1–1 | Honvéd | Sopron |
| 17:00 CEST (UTC+2) | Dancs (yellow card) 29'; Sira 67'; Feczesin (red card) 85' | Report | Koós 52'; Angoua (yellow card) 66'; László (yellow card) 85' | Stadium: Káposztás utcai Stadion; Attendance: 3,500; Referee: Zsolt Szabó; Assistant referees: Róbert Kispál, Zsolt Márton; Fourth official: Tibor Farkas |

| 21 April 2007 25 | Sopron | 3–1 | Pécs | Sopron |
| 18:00 CEST (UTC+2) | Radu 8'; Munteanu (yellow card) 33'; Rus 38', (yellow card) 62'; Magasföldi (yellow card) 79', (goal) 89' | Report | Z. Varga II (yellow card) 47'; Szabados (yellow card) 54'; Sipos 65' | Stadium: Káposztás utcai Stadion; Attendance: 2,000; Referee: Péter Solmyosi; Assistant referees: Oszkár Lémon, Gábor Takács; Fourth official: Krisztián Marton |

| 28 April 2007 26 | Paks | 1–0 | Sopron | Paks |
| 16:00 CEST (UTC+2) | Buzás 86' | Report | Sifter (yellow card) 63' | Stadium: Fehérvári úti Stadion; Attendance: 1,500; Referee: Zoltán Iványi; Assistant referees: István Albert, Zsolt Szpisják; Fourth official: Gábor Péter Kovács |

| 5 May 2007 27 | Sopron | 1–0 | Vasas | Sopron |
| 18:00 CEST (UTC+2) | Sira (yellow card) 52' (yellow-red card) 63'; Magasföldi 74'; Dragomir (yellow card) 84' | Report | G. Kovács (yellow card) 7'; Z. Pintér (yellow card) 90' | Stadium: Káposztás utcai Stadion; Attendance: 2,000; Referee: Sándor Gergely; Assistant referees: Zoltán Szalai, Balázs Farkas; Fourth official: Tibor Gyarmati II |

| 12 May 2007 28 | Kaposvár | 2–2 | Sopron | Kaposvár |
| 18:00 CEST (UTC+2) | Vasiljević 3'; A. Pintér (yellow card) 71', (goal) 88'; Petrók (yellow card) 76' | Report | Magasföldi 7'; Ibric (yellow card) 75'; Demjén 89'; Cigan (yellow card) 90+2' | Stadium: Rákóczi Stadion; Attendance: 2,800; Referee: Csaba Imre Sápi; Assistant referees: László Viszokai, Szabolcs Deutsch; Fourth official: Csaba Ursprung |

| 19 May 2007 29 | Sopron | 3–1 | Dunakanyar-Vác | Sopron |
| 19:00 CEST (UTC+2) | A. Horváth I 3'; Magasföldi 32'; Kolling 66'; Munteanu (yellow card) 82' | Report | Palásthy 36' | Stadium: Káposztás utcai Stadion; Attendance: 2,500; Referee: István Mészáros; Assistant referees: Gábor Takács, Zsolt Márton; Fourth official: József Erdős |

| 26 May 2007 30 | Debrecen | 2–1 | Sopron | Debrecen |
| 17:00 CEST (UTC+2) | Dzsudzsák 25'; T. Sándor 71'; Vukmir (yellow card) 90' | Report | Cigan 37' | Stadium: Oláh Gábor utcai Stadion; Attendance: 10,500; Referee: Zoltán Iványi; Assistant referees: István Albert, Zsolt Szpisják; Fourth official: János Takács |

=== Magyar Kupa ===
| 20 September 2006 Third round | Sárszentmiklós | 0–1 | Sopron | Sárszentmiklós |
| 15:30 CEST (UTC+2) | | Report | Demjén | Stadium: Sárszentmiklósi Sporttelep; Attendance: 500; Referee: Sultok |

| 18 October 2006 Round of 32 | Bonyhád | 1–6 | Sopron | Bonyhád |
| 13:30 CEST (UTC+2) | Bíró | Report | Feczesin 4x; Ivancsics 2x | Stadium: Sport úti Pálya; Attendance: 700; Referee: Herbály; Assistant referees: Márton, Butkai |

==== Round of 16 ====
| 8 November 2006 First leg | Sopron | 1–2 | Diósgyőr | Sopron |
| 14:00 CET (UTC+1) | Ankamah (yellow card) 12'; Feczesin 21' (pen.) | Report | A. Simon 31'; Kéthévoama 73'; Mogyorósi (yellow card) 90+1' | Stadium: Káposztás utcai Stadion; Attendance: 600; Referee: István Mészáros; Assistant referees: Dr. Péter Szabó, László Viszokai |

| 22 November 2006 Second leg | Diósgyőr | 4–1 (6–2 agg.) | Sopron | Miskolc |
| 18:00 CET (UTC+1) | Vitelki (yellow card) 34'; Rubint (yellow card) 50'; Sipeki 61'; Elek (yellow card) 62'; Farkas (yellow card) 63'; Szögedi 67' (pen.); Kerényi (yellow card) 69'; Abdou 75'; A. Simon 84' | Report | Feczesin 37', (yellow card) 75'; Radu (yellow card) 48'; Bagoly (red card) 65' | Stadium: Diósgyőri Stadion; Attendance: 3,000; Referee: Sándor Andó-Szabó; Assistant referees: Rischák, Gábor Kormányos II |
Note: Diósgyőr won 6–2 on aggregate.

=== UEFA Intertoto Cup ===
==== Second round ====
| 1 July 2006 First leg | Sopron (Hungary) | 3–3 | (Turkey) Kayserispor | Sopron, Hungary |
| 19:00 CEST (UTC+2) | Bagoly (yellow card) 28'; Sifter (yellow card) 29'; Rabóczki (yellow card) 36'; Feczesin 47'; Korudzhiev 65'; A. Horváth I (yellow card) 66'; Ibric 70' | Report | Başdağ (yellow card) 36'; Gökhan 37' (pen.), 44'; Topuz 59'; Ceylan (yellow card) 69' | Stadium: Káposztás utcai Stadion; Attendance: 2,500; Referee: Igor Zakharov (Russia); Assistant referees: Oleg Antoskin (Russia), Lev Antonov (Russia) |

| 8 July 2006 Second leg | Kayserispor (Turkey) | 1–0 (4–3 agg.) | (Hungary) Sopron | Kayseri, Turkey |
| 20:00 EEST (UTC+3) | Ceylan 82' | Report | Munteanu (yellow card) 17'; Bagoly (yellow card) 75'; Homei (yellow card) 78'; Radu (yellow card) 81' | Stadium: Kayseri Atatürk Stadium; Attendance: 12,000; Referee: Pavel Olšiak (Slovakia); Assistant referees: Radomir Sluk (Slovakia), Vladimír Medved (Slovakia) |
Note: Kayserispor won 4–3 on aggregate.
