= 2006–07 Diósgyőri VTK season =

Diósgyőr
2006–07 season
- Manager: János Csank
- Stadium: Diósgyőri Stadion
- Nemzeti Bajnokság I: 9th
- Magyar Kupa: Semi-finals
- Top goalscorer: League: Attila Simon (9); All: Attila Simon (17)
- Highest home attendance: 8,000 v Újpest (30 July 2006, Nemzeti Bajnokság I)
- Lowest home attendance: 2,000 v Vasas (22 September 2006, Nemzeti Bajnokság I)
- Average home league attendance: 4,267
- Biggest win: 4–1 v Sopron (Home, 22 November 2006, Magyar Kupa); 3–0 v Újpest (Away, 4 December 2006, Nemzeti Bajnokság I)
- Biggest defeat: 1–5 v Debrecen (Home, 20 April 2007, Nemzeti Bajnokság I); 0–4 v Győr (Away, 26 May 2007, Nemzeti Bajnokság I)

The 2006–07 season was Diósgyőri Vasgyárak Testgyakorló Köre's 43rd competitive season, 3rd consecutive season in the Nemzeti Bajnokság I and 95th season in existence as a football club. In addition to the domestic league, Diósgyőr participated in that season's editions of the Magyar Kupa.

== Squad ==
Squad at end of season

Note: Flags indicate national team as defined under FIFA eligibility rules; some limited exceptions apply. Players may hold more than one non-FIFA nationality.

| No. | Pos. | Nation | Player |
|---|---|---|---|
| 3 | DF | (Hungary) HUN | Norbert Elek |
| 5 | MF | (Romania) ROU | Ciprian Binder |
| 7 | MF | (Hungary) HUN | Ádám Horváth |
| 8 | MF | (Hungary) HUN | Zoltán Vitelki |
| 9 | FW | (Hungary) HUN | Milán Faggyas |
| 10 | MF | (Central African Republic) CTA | Foxi Kéthévoama |
| 13 | DF | (Slovakia) SVK | Richárd Rubint |
| 14 | FW | (Cameroon) CMR | Halidou Douva Abdou |
| 16 | MF | (Hungary) HUN | Tibor Halgas |
| 18 | DF | (Hungary) HUN | Gábor Kerényi |

| No. | Pos. | Nation | Player |
|---|---|---|---|
| 21 | MF | (Hungary) HUN | Szilárd Rebecsák |
| 22 | MF | (Hungary) HUN | Ádám Kovács |
| 23 | MF | (Hungary) HUN | István Sipeki |
| 25 | GK | (Hungary) HUN | Pál Szalma |
| 66 | DF | (Hungary) HUN | Viktor Farkas |
| 81 | MF | (Hungary) HUN | Attila Katona |
| 83 | FW | (Hungary) HUN | Attila Simon |
| 87 | GK | (Hungary) HUN | István Verpecz |
| 88 | MF | (Hungary) HUN | Tamás Huszák |
| 89 | DF | (Hungary) HUN | Gergő Menyhért |

== Competitions ==
=== Overview ===
| Competition | First match | Last match | Starting round | Final position | Record | | | | | | | |
| Competition | First match | Last match | Starting round | Final position | Pld | W | D | L | GF | GA | GD | Win % |
|---|---|---|---|---|---|---|---|---|---|---|---|---|
| Nemzeti Bajnokság I | 30 July 2006 | 26 May 2007 | Matchday 1 | 9th | 30 | 11 | 5 | 14 | 40 | 52 | −12 | 36.67 |
| Magyar Kupa | 26 September 2006 | 25 April 2007 | Third round | Semi-finals | 8 | 5 | 2 | 1 | 17 | 10 | +7 | 62.50 |
| Total | | | | | 38 | 16 | 7 | 15 | 57 | 62 | −5 | 42.11 |

Source: Competitions

=== Nemzeti Bajnokság I ===
==== League table ====
| Pos | Team | Pld | W | D | L | GF | GA | GD | Pts | Qualification or relegation |
|---|---|---|---|---|---|---|---|---|---|---|
| 7 | Kaposvár | 30 | 12 | 5 | 13 | 40 | 36 | +4 | 41 | |
| 8 | Honvéd | 30 | 11 | 8 | 11 | 48 | 43 | +5 | 41 | Qualification for the UEFA Cup first qualifying round (Note: Honvéd qualified for the UEFA Cup first qualifying round as the 2006–07 Magyar Kupa winners.) |
| 9 | Diósgyőr | 30 | 11 | 5 | 14 | 40 | 52 | −12 | 38 | |
| 10 | Sopron | 30 | 11 | 4 | 15 | 33 | 46 | −13 | 37 | |
| 11 | Paks | 30 | 10 | 7 | 13 | 34 | 38 | −4 | 37 | |

Source: soccerway.com

==== Results summary ====
| Overall | | | | | | | | Home | | | | | | Away | | | | | |
| Pld | W | D | L | GF | GA | GD | Pts | W | D | L | GF | GA | GD | W | D | L | GF | GA | GD |
|---|---|---|---|---|---|---|---|---|---|---|---|---|---|---|---|---|---|---|---|
| 30 | 11 | 5 | 14 | 40 | 52 | −12 | 38 | 8 | 1 | 6 | 21 | 25 | −4 | 3 | 4 | 8 | 19 | 27 | −8 |

Source: Hungarian Football Federation

==== Results by round ====
| Round | 1 | 2 | 3 | 4 | 5 | 6 | 7 | 8 | 9 | 10 | 11 | 12 | 13 | 14 | 15 | 16 | 17 | 18 | 19 | 20 | 21 | 22 | 23 | 24 | 25 | 26 | 27 | 28 | 29 | 30 |
|---|---|---|---|---|---|---|---|---|---|---|---|---|---|---|---|---|---|---|---|---|---|---|---|---|---|---|---|---|---|---|
| Ground | H | A | H | A | H | A | H | A | H | A | H | A | H | H | H | A | H | A | H | A | H | A | H | A | H | A | H | A | A | A |
| Result | W | W | L | L | L | L | L | W | W | D | W | L | L | W | W | W | W | D | L | L | W | D | D | L | L | L | W | L | D | L |
| Position | 7 | 1 | 5 | 7 | 9 | 11 | 12 | 9 | 9 | 9 | 7 | 9 | 10 | 8 | 6 | 6 | 6 | 5 | 6 | 7 | 5 | 6 | 6 | 6 | 7 | 8 | 7 | 8 | 9 | 9 |
| Points | 3 | 6 | 6 | 6 | 6 | 6 | 6 | 9 | 12 | 13 | 16 | 16 | 16 | 19 | 22 | 25 | 28 | 29 | 29 | 29 | 32 | 33 | 34 | 34 | 34 | 34 | 37 | 37 | 38 | 38 |

Source: Matches
A = Away; H = Home; W = Win; D = Draw; L = Loss

==== Matches ====
| 30 July 2006 1 | Diósgyőr | 1–0 | Újpest | Miskolc |
| 17:30 CEST (UTC+2) | Farkas (yellow card) 22', (goal) 58' | Report | Tisza (yellow card) 38'; Hullám (yellow card) 47'; B. Tóth (yellow card) 47' | Stadium: Diósgyőri Stadion; Attendance: 8,000; Referee: Viktor Kassai; Assistant referees: Gábor Erős, István Tóth; Fourth official: Péter Herbály |

| 5 August 2006 2 | Rákospalota | 0–2 | Diósgyőr | Budapest |
| 17:30 CEST (UTC+2) | Cseri (yellow card) 18'; Pusztai (yellow card) 90+2' | Report | V. Farkas (yellow card) 19'; Szögedi (yellow card) 28'; A. Simon 74'; Stanić 76' | Stadium: Budai II. László Stadion; Attendance: 2,000; Referee: Péter Solymosi; Assistant referees: István Tóth, Tamás Raff; Fourth official: Gábor Takács |

| 18 August 2006 3 | Diósgyőr | 1–4 | Zalaegerszeg | Miskolc |
| 19:00 CEST (UTC+2) | Mogyorósi (yellow card) 19'; Csóka 26' (o.g.); Rubint (yellow card) 53' | Report | Ferenczi 2', 81'; L. Nagy 31', 55', (yellow card) 32'; B. Molnár (yellow card) 38'; Simonfalvi (yellow card) 90+1' | Stadium: Diósgyőri Stadion; Attendance: 6,500; Referee: Csaba Imre Sápi; Assistant referees: Attila Kelemen, Gyula Fehér; Fourth official: Roland Veizer |

| 26 August 2006 4 | Sopron | 1–0 | Diósgyőr | Sopron |
| 19:00 CEST (UTC+2) | Demjén (yellow card) 19'; Magasföldi (yellow card) 32', (goal) 58'; Munteanu (yellow card) 86' | Report | Mogyorósi (yellow card) 17' | Stadium: Káposztás utcai Stadion; Attendance: 3,100; Referee: Ferenc Bede; Assistant referees: Tibor Vámos, Vencel Tóth II; Fourth official: Gergely Sulyok |

| 8 September 2006 5 | Diósgyőr | 1–3 | Pécs | Miskolc |
| 19:00 CEST (UTC+2) | A. Simon 90+1' | Report | Kulcsár 1'; Pest 3'; Dienes (yellow card) 17'; Pavičević (yellow card) 29'; Finta (yellow card) 56'; Balaskó 78' | Stadium: Diósgyőri Stadion; Attendance: 2,500; Referee: István Mészáros; Assistant referees: Ferenc Székely, László Viszokai; Fourth official: János Takács |

| 16 September 2006 6 | Paks | 2–1 | Diósgyőr | Paks |
| 16:00 CEST (UTC+2) | Báló 12'; Z. Molnár (yellow card) 15'; Belényesi 19'; Benedeczki (yellow card) 44' | Report | A. Simon 5'; Farkas (yellow card) 34'; Buz (yellow card) 49'; Elek (yellow card) 66'; Katona (red card) 89' | Stadium: Fehérvári úti Stadion; Attendance: 1,000; Referee: István Vad; Assistant referees: Dr. Péter Kovács, Imre Attila Nagy; Fourth official: Gergő Király |

| 22 September 2006 7 | Diósgyőr | 1–2 | Vasas | Miskolc |
| 19:00 CEST (UTC+2) | Sipeki (yellow card) 32'; Elek (yellow card) 40'; Mogyorósi (yellow card) 46'; Szögedi 50' | Report | Unierzyski 30', (yellow card) 86'; Lázok (yellow card) 45'; Tóth 51'; Fehér (yellow card) 83' | Stadium: Diósgyőri Stadion; Attendance: 2,000; Referee: Zsolt Szabó; Assistant referees: Róbert Kispál, Dr. Péter Hegyi; Fourth official: Ákos Telek |

| 30 September 2006 8 | Kaposvár | 1–2 | Diósgyőr | Kaposvár |
| 18:00 CEST (UTC+2) | Zahorecz (yellow card) 9'; Grúz (yellow card) 65' (yellow-red card) 69'; Alves 75' | Report | Farkas (yellow card) 15'; Buz (yellow card) 45' (yellow-red card) 47'; Szögedi 52'; Kéthévoama (yellow card) 81', (goal) 90+3' | Stadium: Rákóczi Stadion; Attendance: 2,000; Referee: Zoltán Szarka; Assistant referees: Zoltán Kovács, Dr. Péter Szabó; Fourth official: Tamás Bognár |

| 14 October 2006 9 | Diósgyőr | 1–0 | Dunakanyar-Vác | Miskolc |
| 14:00 CEST (UTC+2) | Binder 29'; Sipeki (yellow card) 83' | Report | Kunzo (yellow card) 32'; Rusvay (yellow card) 53' | Stadium: Diósgyőri Stadion; Attendance: 3,000; Referee: Krisztián Pánczél; Assistant referees: Zoltán Tompos, Vencel Tóth II; Fourth official: János Takács |

| 20 October 2006 10 | Debrecen | 1–1 | Diósgyőr | Debrecen |
| 19:00 CEST (UTC+2) | T. Sándor 26' | Report | Mogyorósi (yellow card) 66'; Abdou (yellow card) 77'; A. Simon 81' | Stadium: Oláh Gábor utcai Stadion; Attendance: 8,500; Referee: Zoltán Iványi; Assistant referees: István Albert, Jozsef Heibl; Fourth official: Gábor Bendik |

| 29 October 2006 11 | Diósgyőr | 3–1 | Tatabánya | Miskolc |
| 17:00 CET (UTC+1) | Filó 16' (o.g.); Farkas (yellow card) 43'; Binder 81'; Kéthévoama 90' | Report | Ndjodo (yellow card) 20'; Vámosi 39' | Stadium: Diósgyőri Stadion; Attendance: 3,000; Referee: Tamás Arany; Assistant referees: István Tóth, Zsolt Butkai; Fourth official: Tamás Bodac |

| 3 November 2006 12 | Fehérvár | 2–0 | Diósgyőr | Székesfehérvár |
| 19:00 CET (UTC+1) | Sitku 54', 89'; Božić (yellow card) 76' | Report | Buz (yellow card) 23' | Stadium: Sóstói Stadion; Attendance: 1,200; Referee: Zoltán Iványi; Assistant referees: István Albert, János Medovarszki; Fourth official: Zsolt Kovács |

| 11 November 2006 13 | Diósgyőr | 0–1 | MTK | Miskolc |
| 17:00 CET (UTC+1) | Abdou (yellow card) 40' | Report | Rodenbücher (yellow card) 25'; Pollák (yellow card) 32'; Kriston (yellow card) 55'; Hrepka 68' | Stadium: Diósgyőri Stadion; Attendance: 5,000; Referee: István Vad; Assistant referees: Attila Kelemen, Gyula Fehér; Fourth official: János Takács |

| 18 November 2006 14 | Diósgyőr | 2–1 | Honvéd | Miskolc |
| 16:00 CET (UTC+1) | Farkas 17'; Mogyorósi (yellow card) 36'; Abdou 55'; Szögedi (yellow card) 68'; Elek (yellow card) 85' | Report | Angoua (red card) 40'; Zana (yellow card) 59'; Schindler 74' | Stadium: Diósgyőri Stadion; Attendance: 4,500; Referee: Sorin Corpodean (Romania); Assistant referees: M. Nagy (Romania), G. Szabó (Romania); Fourth official: Csaba Imre Sápi (Hungary) |

| 25 November 2006 15 | Diósgyőr | 4–3 | Győr | Miskolc |
| 16:00 CET (UTC+1) | Elek 2'; Kéthévoama 22', (yellow card) 22'; Vitelki 51'; Abdou (yellow card) 60' (yellow-red card) 87'; Farkas 74', (yellow card) 74' | Report | Bajzát 16', 32', 57', (yellow card) 77'; Tokody (yellow card) 64'; P. Tóth (yellow card) 84'; Bank (yellow card) 90+1' | Stadium: Diósgyőri Stadion; Attendance: 4,500; Referee: Csaba Imre Sápi; Assistant referees: Zoltán Szalai, Tibor Vígh; Fourth official: Roland Veizer |

| 4 December 2006 16 | Újpest | 0–3 | Diósgyőr | Budapest |
| 18:00 CET (UTC+1) | Erős (yellow card) 41'; Völgyi (yellow card) 85' | Report | Kéthévoama 5'; A. Simon 43'; Halgas 66', (yellow card) 66'; Szögedi (yellow card) 81'; Mogyorósi (yellow card) 83' | Stadium: Szusza Ferenc Stadion; Attendance: 3,000; Referee: Tamás Bognár; Assistant referees: Dr. Péter Szabó, Dr. Péter Kovács; Fourth official: Gábor Oláh |

| 10 December 2006 17 | Diósgyőr | 1–0 | Rákospalota | Miskolc |
| 15:00 CET (UTC+1) | Kéthévoama 5'; Szögedi (yellow card) 79'; Katona (yellow card) 84' | Report | Pusztai (yellow card) 4' (yellow-red card) 67' | Stadium: Diósgyőri Stadion; Attendance: 5,500; Referee: Sándor Andó-Szabó; Assistant referees: István Albert, István Tóth; Fourth official: László Varga |

| 24 February 2007 18 | Zalaegerszeg | 2–2 | Diósgyőr | Zalaegerszeg |
| 15:00 CET (UTC+1) | Máté 25'; Rubint 41' (o.g.); B. Molnár (yellow card) 86' | Report | Halgas 24', (yellow card) 24'; A. Simon 27'; Elek (yellow card) 32'; Farkas (yellow card) 87'; Vitelki (yellow card) 90+1' | Stadium: ZTE Arena; Attendance: 4,000; Referee: Szabolcs Szilasi; Assistant referees: Oszkár Lémon, Zoltán Kovács; Fourth official: Norbert Ferencz |

| 3 March 2007 19 | Diósgyőr | 0–2 | Sopron | Miskolc |
| 16:00 CET (UTC+1) | | Report | Ibric (yellow card) 38'; Rus (yellow card) 51'; Feczesin 63'; Cigan 88' | Stadium: Diósgyőri Stadion; Attendance: 5,000; Referee: Csaba Imre Sápi; Assistant referees: Gyula Fehér, Tibor Vígh; Fourth official: Péter Berettyán |

| 10 March 2007 20 | Pécs | 1–0 | Diósgyőr | Pécs |
| 16:00 CET (UTC+1) | Sztipánovics 34'; Kulcsár (yellow card) 61'; Lantos (yellow card) 81' | Report | Kéthévoama (yellow card) 24'; Binder (yellow card) 85'; Halgas (yellow card) 90+3' | Stadium: Stadion PMFC; Attendance: 800; Referee: István Mészáros; Assistant referees: László Viszokai, Vencel Tóth II; Fourth official: Norbert Ferencz |

| 17 March 2007 21 | Diósgyőr | 2–1 | Paks | Miskolc |
| 15:00 CET (UTC+1) | Rubint 21'; Farkas 34'; Huszák (yellow card) 72' | Report | Mészáros (yellow card) 38'; Heffler (yellow card) 54'; Böde (yellow card) 63'; Katona 87' (o.g.) | Stadium: Diósgyőri Stadion; Attendance: 3,500; Referee: Krisztián Pánczél; Assistant referees: Balázs Farkas, István Tóth; Fourth official: Gábor Péter Kovács |

| 31 March 2007 22 | Vasas | 2–2 | Diósgyőr | Budapest |
| 16:00 CEST (UTC+2) | Lázok 60', 77' | Report | Abdou 79'; Halgas 89'; Sadjo (yellow card) 90+1' | Stadium: Illovszky Rudolf Stadion; Attendance: 4,000; Referee: József Berger; Assistant referees: Zsolt Márton, Attila Forgács; Fourth official: Gábor Oláh |

| 7 April 2007 23 | Diósgyőr | 1–1 | Kaposvár | Miskolc |
| 17:00 CEST (UTC+2) | Kéthévoama 32'; Katona (yellow card) 80' | Report | Zahorecz (yellow card) 18'; Alves 28'; P. Szakály (yellow card) 78' | Stadium: Diósgyőri Stadion; Attendance: 4,500; Referee: István Vad; Assistant referees: Attila Kelemen, Gyula Fehér; Fourth official: János Takács |

| 14 April 2007 24 | Dunakanyar-Vác | 1–0 | Diósgyőr | Vác |
| 17:00 CEST (UTC+2) | Makrai (yellow card) 11'; Thomas (red card) 27'; Rusvay 41'; Geovanni (yellow card) 66'; Gulyás (yellow card) 70' | Report | Hegedűs (yellow card) 4'; Sadjo (yellow card) 88' | Stadium: Ligeti Stadion; Attendance: 1,200; Referee: Gergely Sulyok; Assistant referees: Zoltán Tompos, Gábor Erős; Fourth official: Gábor Oláh |

| 20 April 2007 25 | Diósgyőr | 1–5 | Debrecen | Miskolc |
| 19:00 CEST (UTC+2) | A. Simon 56'; Huszák (yellow card) 66' | Report | Dzsudzsák 8', 62'; Leandro (yellow card) 26', (goal) 29'; Mészáros 38'; Sidibe 70' | Stadium: Diósgyőri Stadion; Attendance: 4,000; Referee: Sándor Andó-Szabó; Assistant referees: Zoltán Szalai, Zsolt Butkai; Fourth official: Attila Hegedűs |

| 28 April 2007 26 | Tatabánya | 5–3 | Diósgyőr | Tatabánya |
| 16:00 CEST (UTC+2) | Hajdú 13', 30'; Kouemaha 36', 56'; Szilágyi 88' | Report | A. Simon 51'; Kéthévoama 85', 90+1' | Stadium: Városi Stadion; Attendance: 1,200; Referee: Zsolt Szabó; Assistant referees: Róbert Kispál, Zsolt Márton; Fourth official: Gergő Király |

| 5 May 2007 27 | Diósgyőr | 2–1 | Fehérvár | Miskolc |
| 18:00 CEST (UTC+2) | Sadjo 6'; Katona (yellow card) 62'; Abdou 66' | Report | G. Horváth II (yellow card) 25' (yellow-red card) 89'; Dajić 41'; Koller (yellow card) 45'; D. Nagy (yellow card) 90' | Stadium: Diósgyőri Stadion; Attendance: 2,500; Referee: Gergely Sulyok; Assistant referees: Jozsef Heibl, Attila Forgács; Fourth official: Ádám Farkas |

| 8 May 2007 28 | MTK | 4–2 | Diósgyőr | Budapest |
| 18:00 CEST (UTC+2) | Czvitkovics (yellow card) 33'; Pintér 36'; L. Horváth 55', (yellow card) 89'; Lambulić 72'; Szabó (yellow card) 81', (goal) 83' | Report | Hegedűs (yellow card) 11'; A. Simon 52'; Binder 89' | Stadium: Hidegkuti Nándor Stadion; Attendance: 1,000; Referee: Viktor Kassai; Assistant referees: Gábor Erős, Tibor Vámos; Fourth official: Ádám Németh |

| 19 May 2007 29 | Honvéd | 1–1 | Diósgyőr | Budapest |
| 19:00 CEST (UTC+2) | Bogdanović 12'; Smiljanić (yellow card) 71' | Report | Sipeki 52'; Halgas (yellow card) 53'; Farkas (yellow card) 85' | Stadium: Bozsik József Stadion; Attendance: 3,800; Referee: Sándor Andó-Szabó; Assistant referees: István Albert, János Medovarszki; Fourth official: Péter Pető |

| 26 May 2007 30 | Győr | 4–0 | Diósgyőr | Győr |
| 18:00 CEST (UTC+2) | Brnović 20', (yellow card) 45'; Bajzát 22', 79'; Böőr 87' | Report | Sadjo (yellow card) 52' | Stadium: ETO Park; Attendance: 4,000; Referee: Tamás Arany; Assistant referees: Attila Forgács, Gábor Takács; Fourth official: Krisztián Király |

=== Magyar Kupa ===
| 26 September 2006 Third round | Baktalórántháza | 1–3 | Diósgyőr | Baktalórántháza |
| | Ádámszki | Report | A. Simon 3x | Stadium: Városi Stadion; Attendance: 800; Referee: Bodacz |

| 25 October 2006 Round of 32 | Budafok | 0–1 | Diósgyőr | Budapest |
| 13:30 CEST (UTC+2) | Fűzfa (yellow card) 8'; Langer (yellow card) 27'; Kővári (yellow card) 32' | Report | Vitelki (yellow card) 18', (goal) 36'; Mogyorósi (yellow card) 60' | Stadium: Promontor utcai Stadion; Attendance: 150; Referee: Szabolcs Szilasi; Assistant referees: Oszkár Lémon, Gábor Takács |

==== Round of 16 ====
| 8 November 2006 First leg | Sopron | 1–2 | Diósgyőr | Sopron |
| 14:00 CET (UTC+1) | Ankamah (yellow card) 12'; Feczesin 21' (pen.) | Report | A. Simon 31'; Kéthévoama 73'; Mogyorósi (yellow card) 90+1' | Stadium: Káposztás utcai Stadion; Attendance: 600; Referee: István Mészáros; Assistant referees: Dr. Péter Szabó, László Viszokai |

| 22 November 2006 Second leg | Diósgyőr | 4–1 (6–2 agg.) | Sopron | Miskolc |
| 18:00 CET (UTC+1) | Vitelki (yellow card) 34'; Rubint (yellow card) 50'; Sipeki 61'; Elek (yellow card) 62'; Farkas (yellow card) 63'; Szögedi 67' (pen.); Kerényi (yellow card) 69'; Abdou 75'; A. Simon 84' | Report | Feczesin 37', (yellow card) 75'; Radu (yellow card) 48'; Bagoly (red card) 65' | Stadium: Diósgyőri Stadion; Attendance: 3,000; Referee: Sándor Andó-Szabó; Assistant referees: Rischák, Gábor Kormányos II |
Note: Diósgyőr won 6–2 on aggregate.

==== Quarter-finals ====
| 21 March 2007 First leg | Diósgyőr | 2–1 | Zalaegerszeg | Miskolc |
| 17:00 CET (UTC+1) | Kéthévoama (yellow card) 2'; A. Simon 29', 46' | Report | Botiș (yellow card) 77' (yellow-red card) 90+1'; Waltner 80' | Stadium: Diósgyőri Stadion; Attendance: 3,500; Referee: Tamás Arany; Assistant referees: Zoltán Tompos, Zsolt Butkai |

| 11 April 2007 Second leg | Zalaegerszeg | 3–3 (4–5 agg.) | Diósgyőr | Zalaegerszeg |
| 18:00 CEST (UTC+2) | Ljubojević 8'; B. Molnár (yellow card) 25'; Lekić 52', (yellow card) 62'; Waltner 62' | Report | Abdou 6', 32'; A. Simon 17'; Sadjo (yellow card) 40'; Huszák (yellow card) 66'; Kéthévoama (yellow card) 85' | Stadium: ZTE Arena; Attendance: 2,500; Referee: Tamás Bognár; Assistant referees: Dr. Péter Szabó, Balázs Huszár; Fourth official: Krisztián Király |
Note: Diósgyőr won 5–4 on aggregate.

==== Semi-finals ====
| 17 April 2007 First leg | Diósgyőr | 0–1 | Debrecen | Miskolc |
| 18:00 CEST (UTC+2) | Rubint (yellow card) 34' | Report | Takács (yellow card) 26'; Sidibe (yellow card) 57', (goal) 85' | Stadium: Diósgyőri Stadion; Attendance: 6,000; Referee: Sándor Gergely; Assistant referees: Róbert Kispál, Balázs Farkas; Fourth official: Tibor Gyarmati II |

| 25 April 2007 Second leg | Debrecen | 2–2 (3–2 agg.) | Diósgyőr | Debrecen |
| 18:00 CEST (UTC+2) | Stojkov 17'; Komlósi (yellow card) 53', (goal) 79' | Report | Katona (yellow card) 42'; Kéthévoama 59'; Farkas 89' | Stadium: Oláh Gábor utcai Stadion; Attendance: 7,000; Referee: Zoltán Iványi; Assistant referees: Zsolt Szpisják, István Albert; Fourth official: János Takács |
Note: Debrecen won 3–2 on aggregate.

== Statistics ==
=== Overall ===
Appearances (Apps) numbers are for appearances in competitive games only, including sub appearances.
Source: Competitions

| No. | Player | Pos. | Nemzeti Bajnokság I | | | | Magyar Kupa | | | | Total | | | |
| No. | Player | Pos. | Apps | Goal | Booked | Sent off (straight red) | Apps | Goal | Booked | Sent off (straight red) | Apps | Goal | Booked | Sent off (straight red) |
|---|---|---|---|---|---|---|---|---|---|---|---|---|---|---|
| 2 | (Hungary) József Mogyorósi | DF | 14 | | 6 | | 3 | | 2 | | 17 | | 8 | |
| 3 | (Hungary) Norbert Elek | DF | 21 | 1 | 4 | | 5 | | 1 | | 26 | 1 | 5 | |
| 4 | (Cameroon) Haman Sadjo | DF | 12 | 1 | 3 | | 4 | | 1 | | 16 | 1 | 4 | |
| 5 | (Romania) Ciprian Binder | MF | 26 | 3 | 1 | | 6 | | | | 32 | 3 | 1 | |
| 8 | (Hungary) Zoltán Vitelki | MF | 28 | 1 | 1 | | 7 | 1 | 2 | | 35 | 2 | 3 | |
| 9 | (Hungary) Milán Faggyas | FW | 16 | | | | 4 | | | | 20 | | | |
| 10 | (Central African Republic) Foxi Kéthévoama | MF | 23 | 8 | 3 | | 6 | 2 | 2 | | 29 | 10 | 5 | |
| 11 | (Bosnia and Herzegovina) Tomislav Stanić | FW | 10 | 1 | | | 2 | | | | 12 | 1 | | |
| 13 | (Slovakia) Richárd Rubint | DF | 25 | 1 | 1 | | 7 | | 2 | | 32 | 1 | 3 | |
| 14 | (Cameroon) Halidou Douva Abdou | FW | 22 | 3 | 3 | 1 | 7 | 3 | | | 29 | 6 | 3 | 1 |
| 16 | (Hungary) Tibor Halgas | MF | 12 | 3 | 4 | | 2 | | | | 14 | 3 | 4 | |
| 17 | (Hungary) Tibor Bokros | DF | | | | | | | | | | | | |
| 18 | (Hungary) Gábor Kerényi | DF | 7 | | | | 2 | | 1 | | 9 | | 1 | |
| 19 | (Hungary) Norbert Lipusz | MF | 6 | | | | 3 | | | | 9 | | | |
| 21 | (Hungary) Szilárd Rebecsák | MF | 5 | | | | | | | | 5 | | | |
| 22 | (Hungary) Ádám Kovács | MF | | | | | | | | | | | | |
| 23 | (Hungary) István Sipeki | MF | 29 | 1 | 2 | | 7 | 1 | | | 36 | 2 | 2 | |
| 25 | (Hungary) Pál Szalma | GK | 28 | | | | 6 | | | | 34 | | | |
| 26 | (Hungary) Zsolt Dénes | GK | 1 | | | | | | | | 1 | | | |
| 26 | (Hungary) Levente Szántai | GK | 2 | | | | 2 | | | | 4 | | | |
| 33 | (Hungary) Gyula Hegedűs | DF | 11 | | 2 | | 4 | | | | 15 | | 2 | |
| 47 | (Argentina) Jeremías Buz | DF | 8 | | 3 | 1 | 2 | | | | 10 | | 3 | 1 |
| 66 | (Hungary) Viktor Farkas | DF | 27 | 4 | 8 | | 7 | 1 | 1 | | 34 | 5 | 9 | |
| 79 | (Hungary) Szilárd Szögedi | MF | 16 | 2 | 4 | | 3 | 1 | | | 19 | 3 | 4 | |
| 81 | (Hungary) Attila Katona | MF | 28 | | 3 | 1 | 8 | | 1 | | 36 | | 4 | 1 |
| 83 | (Hungary) Attila Simon | FW | 30 | 9 | | | 8 | 8 | | | 38 | 17 | | |
| 87 | (Hungary) István Verpecz | GK | | | | | | | | | | | | |
| 88 | (Hungary) Tamás Huszák | MF | 8 | | 2 | | 3 | | 1 | | 11 | | 3 | |
| 89 | (Hungary) Gergő Menyhért | DF | 2 | | | | 1 | | | | 3 | | | |
| Own goals | | | | 2 | | | | | | | | 2 | | |
| Totals | | | | 40 | 50 | 3 | | 17 | 14 | | | 57 | 64 | 3 |

=== Hat-tricks ===
| No. | Player | Against | Result | Date | Competition |
|---|---|---|---|---|---|
| 83 | (Hungary) Attila Simon | Baktalórántháza (A) | 1–3 | 26 September 2006 | Magyar Kupa |

=== Clean sheets ===
| | | | Clean sheets | | |
| No. | Player | Games Played | Nemzeti Bajnokság I | Magyar Kupa | Total |
|---|---|---|---|---|---|
| 25 | (Hungary) Pál Szalma | 34 | 5 | | 5 |
| 26 | (Hungary) Levente Szántai | 4 | | 1 | 1 |
| 26 | (Hungary) Zsolt Dénes | 1 | 1 | | 1 |
| 87 | (Hungary) István Verpecz | | | | |
| Totals | | | 6 | 1 | 7 |
