= 2005–06 Diósgyőri VTK season =

Diósgyőr
2005–06 season
- Manager: György Gálhidi (until 22 September 2005); György Veréb (caretaker, from 22 September 2005 to 26 September 2005); Zoran Kuntić (from 26 September 2005 to 21 October 2005); János Pajkos (from 21 October 2005)
- Stadium: Diósgyőri Stadion
- Nemzeti Bajnokság I: 8th
- Magyar Kupa: Third round
- Highest home attendance: 8,500 v Ferencváros (23 April 2006, Nemzeti Bajnokság I)
- Lowest home attendance: 2,000 v Kaposvár (19 May 2006, Nemzeti Bajnokság I)
- Average home league attendance: 5,033
- Biggest win: 5–1 v Gyöngyös (Away, 11 September 2005, Magyar Kupa)
- Biggest defeat: 0–5 v Pécs (Away, 17 September 2005, Nemzeti Bajnokság I); 0–5 v Fehérvár (Away, 3 March 2006, Nemzeti Bajnokság I)

The 2005–06 season was Diósgyőri Vasgyárak Testgyakorló Köre's 42nd competitive season, 2nd consecutive season in the Nemzeti Bajnokság I and 94th season in existence as a football club. In addition to the domestic league, Diósgyőr participated in that season's editions of the Magyar Kupa.

== Squad ==
Squad at end of season

Note: Flags indicate national team as defined under FIFA eligibility rules; some limited exceptions apply. Players may hold more than one non-FIFA nationality.

No.	Pos.	Nation	Player
1	GK	(Hungary) HUN	Krisztián Berki
2	DF	(Hungary) HUN	József Mogyorósi
3	DF	(Hungary) HUN	Norbert Elek
4	DF	(Hungary) HUN	Marcell Fodor
5	FW	(Romania) ROU	Ciprian Binder
6	MF	(Hungary) HUN	László Almási
7	MF	(Hungary) HUN	Attila Simon
8	MF	(Hungary) HUN	Zoltán Vitelki
9	FW	(Hungary) HUN	László Lőrincz
10	MF	(Hungary) HUN	Szilárd Szögedi
14	DF	(Hungary) HUN	Viktor Farkas
16	MF	(Hungary) HUN	Tibor Halgas

No.	Pos.	Nation	Player
17	MF	(Hungary) HUN	Ádám Horváth
18	FW	(Hungary) HUN	Péter Urbin
19	MF	(Hungary) HUN	Norbert Lipusz
20	MF	(Hungary) HUN	Gergő Jeremiás
22	FW	(Hungary) HUN	Milán Faggyas
23	MF	(Hungary) HUN	István Sipeki
25	GK	(Hungary) HUN	Pál Szalma
26	MF	(Hungary) HUN	Norbert Farkas
29	FW	(Hungary) HUN	Gergely Balázs
66	GK	(Hungary) HUN	István Kövesfalvi
81	MF	(Hungary) HUN	Attila Katona
89	MF	(Hungary) HUN	Gergő Menyhért

== Competitions ==
=== Overview ===
Competition	First match	Last match	Starting round	Final position	Record							
Competition	First match	Last match	Starting round	Final position	Pld	W	D	L	GF	GA	GD	Win %
Nemzeti Bajnokság I	31 July 2005	3 June 2006	Matchday 1	8th	30	10	7	13	33	44	−11	33.33
Magyar Kupa	11 September 2005	21 September 2005	Second round	Third round	2	1	1	0	7	3	+4	50.00
Total					32	11	8	13	40	47	−7	34.38

Source: Competitions

=== Nemzeti Bajnokság I ===
==== League table ====
Pos	Team	Pld	W	D	L	GF	GA	GD	Pts	Qualification or relegation
6	Ferencváros (R)	30	10	11	9	43	38	+5	41	Relegated to Nemzeti Bajnokság II (Note: Ferencvárosi TC were relegated to the Nemzeti Bajnokság II because the club failed to comply with UEFA licensing rules.)
7	Kaposvár	30	10	7	13	35	41	−6	37	
8	Diósgyőr	30	10	7	13	33	44	−11	37	
9	Győr	30	9	9	12	47	50	−3	36	
10	Sopron	30	9	8	13	39	39	0	35	Qualification for Intertoto Cup second round

Source: RSSSF
(R) Relegated

==== Results summary ====
Overall								Home						Away					
Pld	W	D	L	GF	GA	GD	Pts	W	D	L	GF	GA	GD	W	D	L	GF	GA	GD
30	10	7	13	33	44	−11	37	5	6	4	17	13	+4	5	1	9	16	31	−15

Source: Competitions

==== Results by round ====
Round	1	2	3	4	5	6	7	8	9	10	11	12	13	14	15	16	17	18	19	20	21	22	23	24	25	26	27	28	29	30
Ground	H	H	A	A	A	A	A	H	A	H	A	H	A	H	A	A	A	H	H	H	H	H	A	H	A	H	A	H	A	H
Result	L	W	L	W	L	L	L	D	D	W	W	W	W	D	W	L	L	L	D	D	D	W	L	L	W	L	L	W	L	D
Position	15	8	12	7	10	10	11	11	12	10	8	7	6	5	5	5	6	7	8	8	8	6	7	9	7	8	8	6	7	8
Points	0	3	3	6	6	6	6	7	8	11	14	17	20	21	24	24	24	24	25	26	27	30	30	30	33	33	33	36	36	37

A = Away; H = Home; W = Win; D = Draw; L = Loss

==== Matches ====
31 July 2005 1	Diósgyőr	0–1	Újpest	Miskolc
11:00 CEST (UTC+2)	Halgas (yellow card) 56'; Z. Pintér (yellow card) 71'	Report	Erős (yellow card) 18'; G. Sándor (yellow card) 31'; Vanczák (red card) 52'; Mogyorósi 58' (o.g.); Feczesin (yellow card) 82'	Stadium: Diósgyőri Stadion; Attendance: 7,000; Referee: János Megyebíró; Assistant referees: Szpisják, P. Tóth

6 August 2005 2	Diósgyőr	1–0	Fehérvár	Miskolc
19:00 CEST (UTC+2)	V. Farkas (yellow card) 31'; F. Horváth 44' (pen.), (yellow card) 44'; Halgas (yellow card) 51'	Report	Simon (yellow card) 21'; Tudor (yellow card) 53'; G. Horváth II (yellow card) 60'; Bartyik (yellow card) 62'	Stadium: Diósgyőri Stadion; Attendance: 6,000; Referee: István Vad; Assistant referees: L. Tóth L., I. Tóth

21 August 2005 3	Vasas	2–0	Diósgyőr	Budapest
19:00 CEST (UTC+2)	Z. Molnár (yellow card) 5'; Elek 15'; Bárányos 87'	Report		Stadium: Illovszky Rudolf Stadion; Attendance: 4,000; Referee: Sándor Gergely; Assistant referees: P. Tóth, Albert

28 August 2005 4	Rákospalota	0–2	Diósgyőr	Budapest
17:00 CEST (UTC+2)	G. Nagy I (yellow card) 19'; Virágh (yellow card) 33'	Report	Tisza (yellow card) 21', (goal) 89'; Kövesfalvi (yellow card) 55'; Mogyorósi (yellow card) 75'; Katona (red card) 80'; F. Horváth 85'	Stadium: Budai II. László Stadion; Attendance: 4,000; Referee: Viktor Kassai; Assistant referees: G. Erős, A. Kelemen

17 September 2005 5	Pécs	5–0	Diósgyőr	Pécs
19:00 CEST (UTC+2)	Szekeres 9'; Balaskó (yellow card) 29', (goal) 72'; Schindler 51'; G. Horváth 57'; Kulcsár 65'	Report	Halgas (yellow card) 24', (red card) 70'; Siminic (yellow card) 26'; V. Farkas (yellow card) 54'; Vámosi (red card) 61'; Z. Pintér (yellow card) 66', (red card) 90'	Stadium: Stadion PMFC; Attendance: 2,000; Referee: Szabolcs Saskőy; Assistant referees: Székely, Heibl

24 September 2005 6	Debrecen	2–0	Diósgyőr	Debrecen
19:00 CEST (UTC+2)	B. Virág 16'; Dzsudzsák (yellow card) 62'; Éger (yellow card) 81'; Z. Kiss I 89'	Report	Tisza (yellow card) 13'; Vitelki (yellow card) 34'; Mogyoródi (yellow card) 79'; V. Farkas (yellow card) 82'	Stadium: Oláh Gábor utcai Stadion; Attendance: 8,500; Referee: János Megyebíró; Assistant referees: P. Tóth, I. Albert

1 October 2005 7	Tatabánya	2–1	Diósgyőr	Tatabánya
15:00 CEST (UTC+2)	Megyesi 80'; Márkus 88'	Report	Vitelki (yellow card) 11'; F. Horváth 28'; Mogyoródi (yellow card) 37'; Gašpar (yellow card) 80'; N. Farkas (yellow card) 84'	Stadium: Városi Stadion; Attendance: 2,000; Referee: János Makai; Assistant referees: I. Mészáros, I. Tóth

15 October 2005 8	Diósgyőr	1–1	Sopron	Miskolc
18:00 CEST (UTC+2)	Gašpar 26'	Report	Gašpar 3' (o.g.); A. Horváth I (yellow card) 41'; Bagoly (yellow card) 67'; Sifter (yellow card) 83'	Stadium: Diósgyőri Stadion; Attendance: 5,500; Referee: Csaba Imre Sápi; Assistant referees: L. Tóth L., T. Vígh

21 October 2005 9	Ferencváros	1–1	Diósgyőr	Budapest
18:00 CEST (UTC+2)	Zo. Balog (yellow card) 29'; Jovánczai 68'	Report	N. Farkas (yellow card) 63'; Katona (yellow card) 77'; Tisza 86'	Stadium: Üllői úti Stadion; Attendance: 4,000; Referee: Péter Solymosi; Assistant referees: G. Takács, I. Albert

29 October 2005 10	Diósgyőr	1–0	Honvéd	Miskolc
18:00 CEST (UTC+2)	F. Horváth 87'	Report		Stadium: Diósgyőri Stadion; Attendance: 8,000; Referee: Tamás Arany; Assistant referees: G. Erőss, A. Kelemen

5 November 2005 11	Pápa	1–3	Diósgyőr	Pápa
18:00 CET (UTC+1)	Lászka (yellow card) 28'; Kovrig 84'; Müller (yellow card) 90'	Report	V. Farkas (yellow card) 2'; F. Horváth 21'; Tisza 29' (pen.), 74', (yellow card) 55'; Vámosi (yellow card) 83'	Stadium: Perutz Stadion; Attendance: 1,200; Referee: Sándor Gergely; Assistant referees: Tompos, L. Varga II

19 November 2005 12	Diósgyőr	3–0	Zalaegerszeg	Miskolc
17:00 CET (UTC+1)	Z. Pintér (yellow card) 4'; F. Horváth 34' (pen.); Vitelki 70'; Katona (yellow card) 82'; Sipeki 86'	Report	Spalević (yellow card) 14'; Kriston (yellow card) 34'; Kaj (yellow card) 53'; Kozmér (yellow card) 73'	Stadium: Diósgyőri Stadion; Attendance: 5,000; Referee: Zsolt Szabó; Assistant referees: Kispál, Dr. Hegyi

26 November 2005 13	Kaposvár	1–3	Diósgyőr	Kaposvár
17:00 CET (UTC+1)	Mező (yellow card) 37'; P. Máté I (yellow card) 55'; P. Szakály (yellow card) 66'; Zsolnai 82'	Report	F. Horváth 35'; Vitelki 42'; Tisza 52'; V. Farkas (yellow card) 77'	Stadium: Rákóczi Stadion; Attendance: 1,500; Referee: János Makai; Assistant referees: I. Mészáros, P. Szabó

3 December 2005 14	Diósgyőr	0–0	MTK	Miskolc
15:00 CET (UTC+1)	Tisza (yellow card) 31'; V. Farkas (yellow card) 42'	Report		Stadium: Diósgyőri Stadion; Attendance: 7,000; Referee: Attila Dubraviczky; Assistant referees: I. A. Nagy, I. Tóth

10 December 2005 15	Győr	1–2	Diósgyőr	Győr
15:00 CET (UTC+1)	Lendvai (yellow card) 6'; Granát 87'; Regedei (yellow card) 90'	Report	Katona 24'; Halgas (yellow card) 38'; F. Horváth 74'; Z. Pintér (yellow card) 79'	Stadium: Stadion ETO; Attendance: 1,000; Referee: József Erdős; Assistant referees: G. Takács, Z. Szalai

25 February 2006 16	Újpest	3–2	Diósgyőr	Budapest
15:00 CET (UTC+1)	Rajczi 7', 69'; Tisza 19'	Report	Elek 76'; Sipeki 86'	Stadium: Szusza Ferenc Stadion; Attendance: 4,086; Referee: Attila Hanacsek; Assistant referees: P. Kovács, I. A. Nagy

3 March 2006 17	Fehérvár	5–0	Diósgyőr	Székesfehérvár
19:00 CET (UTC+1)	Dvéri 45'; Sitku 60', 78' (pen.); Györök 74'; G. Horváth II (yellow card) 80'; Lattenstein 89'	Report	Vitelki (yellow card) 8'; V. Farkas (yellow card) 32'; Simon (yellow card) 87'	Stadium: Sóstói Stadion; Attendance: 2,500; Referee: Szabolcs Saskőy; Assistant referees: Székely, Heibl

11 March 2006 18	Diósgyőr	0–2	Vasas	Miskolc
16:00 CET (UTC+1)	Simon (yellow card) 48'	Report	H. Rósa 12'; O. Szabó 77'; Kapič (yellow card) 80'	Stadium: Diósgyőri Stadion; Attendance: 4,000; Referee: József Erdős; Assistant referees: Kelemen, L. Tóth L.

18 March 2006 19	Diósgyőr	1–1	Rákospalota	Miskolc
16:00 CET (UTC+1)	Mogyorósi (yellow card) 13'; Vitelki (yellow card) 41'; Szögedi 76'; Fodor (yellow card) 90'	Report	Polonkai (yellow card) 28', (goal) 82'; Cseri (yellow card) 57'; Földvári (yellow card) 89' (yellow-red card) 90'	Stadium: Diósgyőri Stadion; Attendance: 3,000; Referee: Péter Solymosi; Assistant referees: G. Takács, B. Gaál

25 March 2006 20	Diósgyőr	0–0	Pécs	Miskolc
17:00 CET (UTC+1)	Sipeki (yellow card) 78'	Report	Lantos (yellow card) 90'	Stadium: Diósgyőri Stadion; Attendance: 3,000; Referee: Csaba Imre Sápi; Assistant referees: Z. Tompos, L. Tóth L.

1 April 2006 21	Diósgyőr	3–3	Debrecen	Miskolc
17:00 CEST (UTC+2)	Sipeki 28', 44'; Szögedi (yellow card) 56'; P. Máté II 77' (o.g.)	Report	T. Sándor 15'; Dzsudzsák 19'; Dombi (yellow card) 32'; Bogdanović 54', (yellow card) 54'; Komlósi (yellow card) 70'; B. Virág (yellow card) 90'	Stadium: Diósgyőri Stadion; Attendance: 6,000; Referee: Szabolcs Saskőy; Assistant referees: P. Kovács, Heibl

8 April 2006 22	Diósgyőr	1–0	Tatabánya	Miskolc
17:00 CEST (UTC+2)	Binder 65'	Report	Z. Balogh (yellow card) 55'; Z. Tóth (yellow card) 67'; Rajnay (yellow card) 90'	Stadium: Diósgyőri Stadion; Attendance: 3,000; Referee: István Mészáros; Assistant referees: Gaál, Z. Szalai

15 April 2006 23	Sopron	2–1	Diósgyőr	Sopron
18:00 CEST (UTC+2)	Radu (yellow card) 16'; Cigan 18'; Signori (yellow card) 35'; Feczesin (yellow card) 49'; A. Horváth I 77', (yellow card) 86'	Report	Halgas (yellow card) 23'; N. Farkas (yellow card) 31'; Binder 87'	Stadium: Káposztás utcai Stadion; Attendance: 3,400; Referee: Zsolt Szabó; Assistant referees: Kispál, Z. Kovács

23 April 2006 24	Diósgyőr	0–1	Ferencváros	Miskolc
11:30 CEST (UTC+2)	Mogyorósi (yellow card) 50'; Halgas (yellow card) 64'	Report	Bajevski 12'; Jovánczai (yellow card) 50'; Lipcsei (yellow card) 58'; Zo. Balog (yellow card) 59'; Leandro (yellow card) 74'	Stadium: Diósgyőri Stadion; Attendance: 8,500; Referee: József Erdős; Assistant referees: Szpisják, L. Tóth L.

29 April 2006 25	Honvéd	0–1	Diósgyőr	Budapest
18:00 CEST (UTC+2)	Udvari (yellow card) 23'; Pomper (yellow card) 29'; N. Kovács (yellow card) 41'	Report	Binder 18'; Szögedi (yellow card) 69'; Vitelki (yellow card) 71'	Stadium: Bozsik József Stadion; Attendance: 1,000; Referee: Tamás Arany; Assistant referees: Hegyi, Heibl

6 May 2006 26	Diósgyőr	0–1	Pápa	Miskolc
19:00 CEST (UTC+2)	Vitelki (yellow card) 29'	Report	Zo. Szabó II 8'; Élder (yellow card) 16'; L. Gaál (yellow card) 65'	Stadium: Diósgyőri Stadion; Attendance: 3,500; Referee: Sándor Andó-Szabó; Assistant referees: Szpisják, P. Tóth

13 May 2006 27	Zalaegerszeg	2–0	Diósgyőr	Zalaegerszeg
19:00 CEST (UTC+2)	Bogunović 21'; J. Sebők 25'	Report	Mogyorósi (yellow card) 30'; Szögedi (yellow card) 76'; Almási (yellow card) 82'	Stadium: ZTE Arena; Attendance: 2,200; Referee: Tamás Bognár; Assistant referees: Dr. P. Szabó, Lémon

19 May 2006 28	Diósgyőr	5–2	Kaposvár	Miskolc
19:00 CEST (UTC+2)	Sipeki 33', 54'; Binder 45', 90+2'; Elek (yellow card) 61'; Jeremiás 71'; Faggyas (yellow card) 82'	Report	Tereánszki-Tóth (yellow card) 26'; Oláh 34', 90+1', (yellow card) 48'; Kriston (yellow card) 61'	Stadium: Diósgyőri Stadion; Attendance: 2,000; Referee: Péter Solymosi; Assistant referees: L. Tóth L., I. Tóth

27 May 2006 29	MTK	4–0	Diósgyőr	Budapest
19:00 CEST (UTC+2)	Czvitkovics 31'; Kanta 34', 53'; Jezdimirović (yellow card) 49'; Illés 90'	Report	Vitelki (yellow card) 39'	Stadium: Hidegkuti Nándor Stadion; Attendance: 1,000; Referee: Sándor Gergely; Assistant referees: Szalai, T. Márkus

3 June 2006 30	Diósgyőr	1–1	Győr	Miskolc
18:00 CEST (UTC+2)	V. Farkas (yellow card) 43'; Katona 72'	Report	Zs. Szabó 42'	Stadium: Diósgyőri Stadion; Attendance: 4,000; Referee: István Mészáros; Assistant referees: Kispál, V. Tóth

=== Magyar Kupa ===
11 September 2005 Second round	Gyöngyös	1–5	Diósgyőr	Gyöngyös
16:00 CEST (UTC+2)	Ivitz (yellow card)	Report	Katona (yellow card); N. Farkas (yellow card); Vámosi 2x; Tisza 2x; Siminic	Stadium: Kömlei Károly Városi Sporttelep; Attendance: 1,200; Referee: Á. Telek; Assistant referees: I. Tóth, R. Olasz

21 September 2005 Third round	Szentlőrinc	2–2 (a.e.t.) (4–2 p)	Diósgyőr	Szentlőrinc
15:30 CEST (UTC+2)	Laki 88'; Leipold 105'	Report	Binder 26'; Z. Pintér 102'	Stadium: Szentlőrinci Sportpálya; Attendance: 500; Referee: András Sóthy; Assistant referees: Beidek, Z. Kiss
	Penalties
	Lóth (penalty missed); Laki (penalty scored); Leipold (penalty scored); Wittrédi (penalty scored); Berkics (penalty scored)		(penalty missed) Mogyoródi; (penalty scored) Vámosi; (penalty scored) Sipeki; (penalty missed) Halgas
Note: Szentlőrinc won 4–2 on penalties.
