= Szalma =

Szalma ([ˈsɒlmɒ], its literal meaning in the Hungarian language being straw) is a Hungarian surname. It may refer to:

- István Szalma (1886–1919), Hungarian printer
- József Szalma (born 1966), Hungarian footballer
- László Szalma (born 1957), retired Hungarian long jumper
- Pál Szalma (born 1982), Hungarian goalkeeper
- Tamás Szalma (born 1958), Hungarian actor
