= Gergely Balázs =

Hungarian footballer

Personal information
- Date of birth: 21 December 1982 (age 43)
- Place of birth: Debrecen, Hungary
- Height: 1.86 m (6 ft 1 in)
- Position: Forward

Youth career
- 1996–2000: Debreceni VSC

Senior career*
Years	Team	Apps	(Gls)
2000–2002	Debreceni VSC	2	(0)
2002–2003	Diósgyőri VTK	17	(2)
2003–2004	Nyíregyháza Spartacus	?	(?)
2004–2005	Győri ETO FC	8	(0)
2005–2006	Diósgyőri VTK	8	(0)
2006–2010	Hajdúböszörményi TE	80	(43)
- * Club domestic league appearances and goals

Gergely Balázs (born 21 December 1982) is a Hungarian former football forward.
