= Fábio Kolling =

Brazilian footballer (born 1985)

Personal information
- Date of birth: 9 October 1985 (age 41)
- Place of birth: Dois Irmãos, Brazil
- Height: 1.91 m (6 ft 3 in)
- Position: Midfielder

Team information
- Current team: Avenida

Senior career*
| Years | Team | Apps | (Gls) |
| 2006 | Novo Hamburgo | 1 | (0) |
| 2006 | → São Paulo (RS) (loan) | 0 | (0) |
| 2006 | São Paulo (RS) | 0 | (0) |
| 2007 | Sopron | 7 | (1) |
| 2007–2009 | Concordia Basel | 44 | (4) |
| 2010 | Avenida | 0 | (0) |
| 2010 | Passo Fundo | 0 | (0) |
| 2010 | Gramadense (amateur) | 0 | (0) |
| 2011 | Avenida | 0 | (0) |
| 2011 | São Luiz | 0 | (0) |
| Total | | 52 | (5) |
- * Club domestic league appearances and goals

Fábio Kolling, nickname Pinho (born 9 October 1985) is a Brazilian footballer who plays for São Luiz. He spent most of season in Rio Grande do Sul, Brazil.

== Biography ==
Kolling signed a contract with Novo Hamburgo in January 2006 until the end of 2006 Campeonato Gaúcho. In March, he left for São Paulo de Rio Grande of Campeonato Gaúcho Segunda Divisão. He extended his contract with Novo Hamburgo in July (until the end of Série C) but returned to São Paulo de Rio Grande in September, for Copa FGF. He played his only Série C match on 6 August 2006, winning Marcílio Dias 2–0, the last group stage of the league, as substitute.

Kolling was transferred to FC Sopron in 2007. He then spent 2 seasons in Challenge League side Concordia Basel.

Kolling returned to Brazil in December 2009 and played for Avenida in 2010 Campeonato Gaúcho. In April, he left for Passo Fundo and in August for amateur side Gramadense. In November 2010 he was re-signed by Avenida until the end of 2011 Campeonato Gaúcho but left for São Luiz in January 2011.
