= Fatih Ceylan =

Turkish footballer (born 1980)

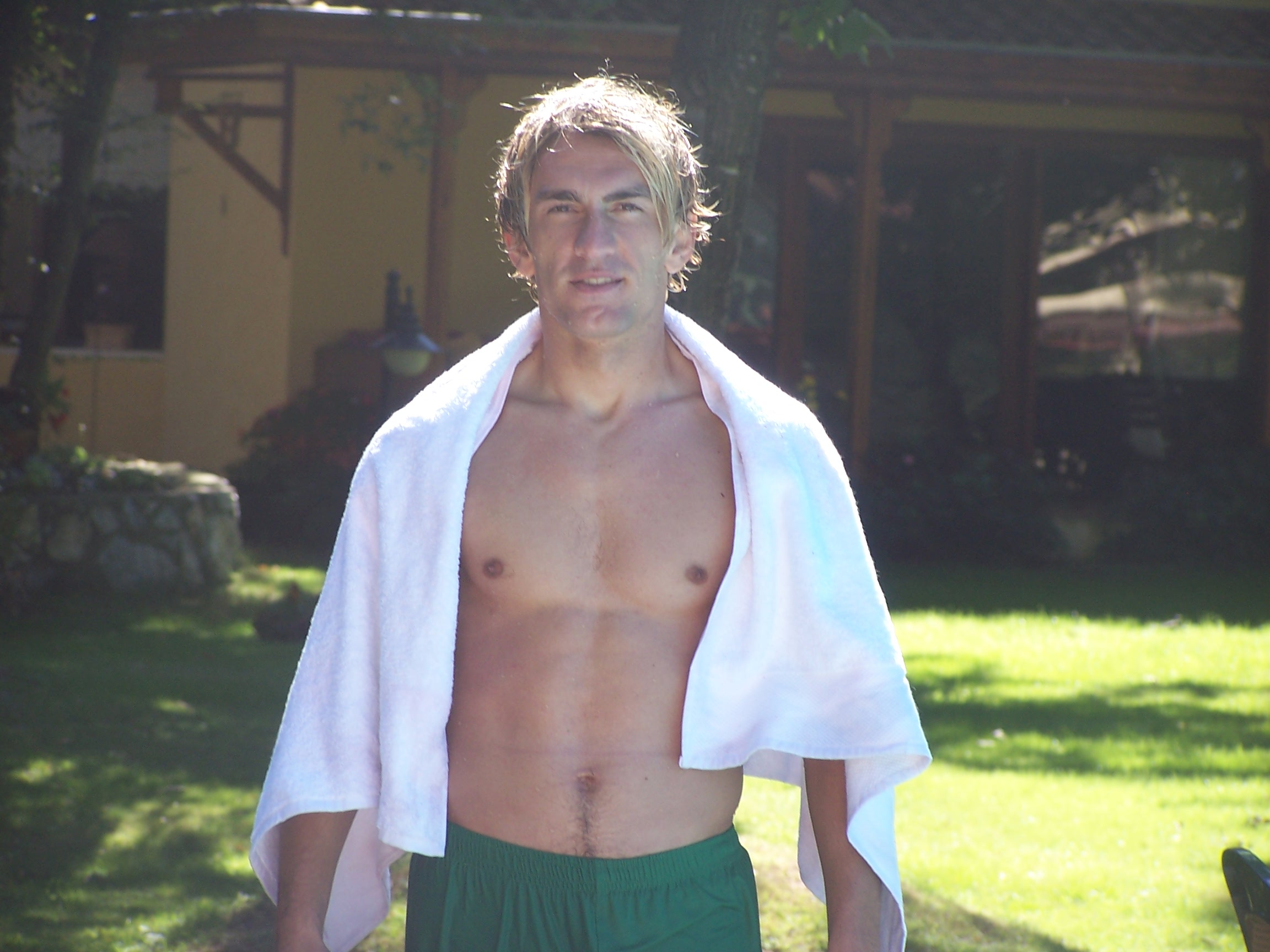
- Fatih Ceylan in 2004

Personal information
- Date of birth: November 25, 1980 (age 45)
- Place of birth: Düzce, Turkey
- Height: 1.80 m (5 ft 11 in)
- Position: Left winger

Team information
- Current team: 1. CfR Pforzheim
- Number: 81

Senior career*
Years	Team	Apps	(Gls)
2001–2005	Sakaryaspor	60	(10)
2005–2009	Kayserispor	58	(7)
2009–2010	Antalyaspor	27	(3)
2010–2011	Karabükspor	3	(0)
2011	Denizlispor	23	(4)
2013–2014	TSV Grunbach	50	(8)
2014–2020	1. CfR Pforzheim	27	(7)

Managerial career
- 2018–2019: 1. CfR Pforzheim (assistant)
- 2019–2022: 1. CfR Pforzheim
- * Club domestic league appearances and goals as of 10 August 2015

Fatih Ceylan (born 25 November 1980) is a Turkish professional footballer who last played as a left winger for 1. CfR Pforzheim. He also managed 1. CfR Pforzheim.

== Honours ==
- Kayserispor
  - Turkish Cup (1): 2008
