= Ognjen Lekić =

Serbian footballer

Ognjen Lekić Огњен Лекић
Personal information
- Full name: Ognjen Lekić
- Date of birth: 7 January 1982 (age 44)
- Place of birth: Šabac, SFR Yugoslavia
- Height: 1.87 m (6 ft 2 in)
- Position: Midfielder

Youth career
- 2000–2001: Marseille
- 2001–2002: Vojvodina

Senior career*
Years	Team	Apps	(Gls)
2001–2002	Vojvodina	1	(0)
2002–2004	Zemun	1	(0)
2002–2003	→ Zmaj Zemun (loan)	14	(3)
2004–2005	Železnik	11	(0)
2005	Hapoel Tel Aviv	4	(0)
2005	Maccabi Petach Tikva	6	(0)
2006	Mačva Šabac	5	(0)
2006	Sopron	6	(0)
2007	Primorje	16	(0)
2007–2008	Celje	20	(0)
2009	Aris Limassol	3	(0)
2010	Leotar	4	(1)
2011	Arieșul Turda	5	(1)
2011–2012	Leotar	14	(1)
2012–2013	Mačva Šabac	26	(5)
2013	Krka	8	(0)
2014	Proleter Novi Sad	14	(1)
2015	Mačva Šabac	8	(1)
Total		166	(13)
- * Club domestic league appearances and goals

Ognjen Lekić (Serbian Cyrillic: Огњен Лекић; born 7 January 1982) is a Serbian professional footballer. As he grew up in France, he also holds French nationality.

Born in Šabac, SR Serbia, SFR Yugoslavia, he had previously played with Serbian clubs Vojvodina, Zemun, Zmaj Zemun, Železnik and Mačva Šabac, Israeli Hapoel Tel Aviv and Maccabi Petah Tikva, Hungarian Sopron Slovenian Primorje, Celje and Krka, Romanian FCM Turda, and Cypriot Aris Limassol F.C.
