= Marius Siminic =

Romanian footballer

Personal information
- Full name: Marius Văleanu Siminic
- Date of birth: 14 September 1981 (age 45)
- Place of birth: Oradea, Romania
- Height: 1.82 m (6 ft 0 in)
- Position: Striker

Youth career
- Bihor Oradea

Senior career*
| Years | Team | Apps | (Gls) |
| 1998–2004 | Bihor Oradea | 54 | (6) |
| 2004 | Liberty Salonta | 7 | (0) |
| 2005 | Diósgyőr | 19 | (3) |
| 2006 | Olimpia Satu Mare | ? | (?) |
| 2006 | Unirea Alba Iulia | ? | (?) |
| 2007 | Bihor Oradea | 0 | (0) |
| 2008 | Arieșul Turda | ? | (?) |
| 2009–2010 | Jiul Rovinari | ? | (?) |
| 2010–2012 | Pandurii II Târgu Jiu | ? | (?) |
| 2012 | Crișul Sântandrei | ? | (?) |
| Total | | 80+ | (9+) |
- * Club domestic league appearances and goals as of 15 November 2017

Marius Văleanu Siminic (born 14 September 1981) is a Romanian former professional footballer who played as a striker.
