= Felix Ankamah =

Ghanaian former footballer (born 1984)

Personal information
- Date of birth: 30 September 1984 (age 42)
- Place of birth: Ghana
- Height: 1.74 m (5 ft 9 in)
- Position: Midfielder

Youth career
- Twente

Senior career*
Years	Team	Apps	(Gls)
2004	KooTeePee	6	(0)
2005	Hämeenlinna		
2006–2007	Sopron	17	(1)
2007–2009	Bechem United		
- * Club domestic league appearances and goals

Felix Ankamah (born 30 September 1984) is a Ghanaian former professional footballer who played as a midfielder. He played in Finnish Veikkausliiga with KooTeePee and in Hungarian NB I with Sopron.
