= Ion Ibric =

Romanian footballer and manager

Personal information
- Date of birth: 27 May 1974 (age 52)
- Place of birth: Pitești, Romania
- Height: 1.80 m (5 ft 11 in)
- Position: Defender

Senior career*
Years	Team	Apps	(Gls)
1995–2003	CSM Reșița	170	(2)
2003–2005	Liberty Salonta	26	(1)
2005–2007	FC Sopron	47	(2)
Total		243	(5)

Managerial career
- 2011–2012: Caransebeș
- 2012–2013: Caransebeș II
- * Club domestic league appearances and goals as of 13 November 2019

Ion Ibric (born 27 May 1974) is a Romanian former professional footballer who played as a defender for teams such as: CSM Reșița, Liberty Salonta and FC Sopron. After retirement, he was for a short period the manager of FC Caransebeș.

== Honours ==
CSM Reșița

- Divizia B: 1996–97
