= Attila Katona =

Hungarian footballer

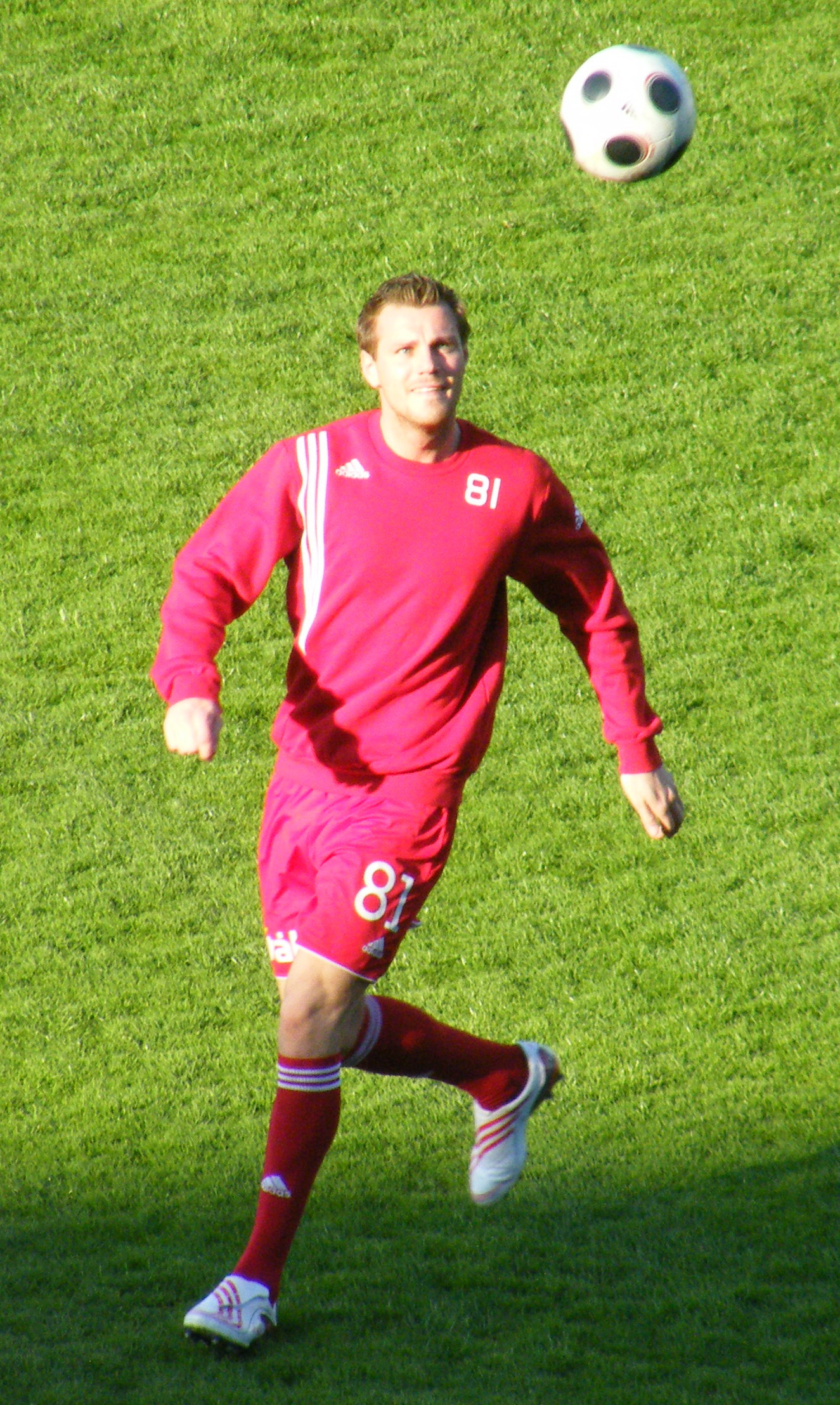

Personal information
- Date of birth: 16 June 1981 (age 45)
- Place of birth: Eger, Hungary
- Height: 1.87 m (6 ft 2 in)
- Position: Defender

Team information
- Current team: THSE Szabadkikötő

Youth career
- 1994–2000: Eger

Senior career*
Years	Team	Apps	(Gls)
2000–2001	Eger	2	(0)
2001–2003	Veszprém		
2003–2004	Besenyőtelek		
2004–2008	Diósgyőr	93	(3)
2008	Thể Công		
2008–2011	Debrecen	14	(0)
2010	→ Bőcs (loan)	12	(0)
2011	Siófok	5	(0)
2011–2013	Eger	33	(2)
2013–2014	Felsőtárkány	22	(1)
2014–2015	Kazincbarcika	22	(1)
2015–2016	Rákosmente	14	(0)
2016	BKV Előre	12	(0)
2016–2017	Tatabánya	17	(4)
2017–2020	Komárom	55	(4)
2020–2022	Eger	45	(2)
2022	Balatonfüred	18	(1)
2022–2023	Komárom	14	(0)
2023–	THSE Szabadkikötő		
- * Club domestic league appearances and goals as of 4 December 2022

Attila Katona (Hungarian: [ˈɒtillɒ ˈkɒtonɒ]; born 16 June 1981) is a Hungarian football player who plays for THSE Szabadkikötő.
