= Halidou Douva Abdou =

Cameroonian footballer

Abdou Douva
Personal information
- Full name: Abdou Halidou Douva
- Date of birth: February 2, 1986 (age 40)
- Place of birth: Maroua, Cameroon
- Height: 1.75 m (5 ft 9 in)
- Position: Forward

Team information
- Current team: US Douala
- Number: 12

Senior career*
| Years | Team | Apps | (Gls) |
| 2003–2006 | Sahel FC | ? | (?) |
| 2006–2008 | Diósgyőri VTK | 22 | (4) |
| 2008–2009 | Cotonsport Garoua | | |
| 2009– | US Douala | | |
- * Club domestic league appearances and goals as of February 7, 2007

Abdou Halidou Douva (born February 2, 1986) is a Cameroonian footballer who is a midfielder who plays for US Douala.

== Career ==
He began his career at Sahel FC in September 2006 transferred to Hungary club Diósgyőri VTK, later in January 2008 moved to Cameroon and signs a contract by Cotonsport Garoua. After one season with Cotonsport Garoua signed in September 2009 with league rival Union Douala.
