= Pál Szalma =

Hungarian footballer

Personal information
- Full name: Pál Szalma
- Date of birth: 12 March 1982 (age 44)
- Place of birth: Vásárosnamény, Hungary
- Height: 1.88 m (6 ft 2 in)
- Position: Goalkeeper

Team information
- Current team: Balmazújváros
- Number: 1

Youth career
- 1998–2000: Nyíregyháza

Senior career*
Years	Team	Apps	(Gls)
1995–2000	Nyíregyháza	0	(0)
1998	→ Záhonyi VSC (loan)		
1999	→ Nyírbátori FC (loan)		
2000–2008	Diósgyőr	42	(0)
2008	Újpest	0	(0)
2008–2009	Jászberényi SE	15	(0)
2009–2011	Siófok	28	(0)
2011–	Balmazújváros	62	(0)

International career
1998–1999	Hungary U-16	1	(0)
1999–2000	Hungary U-17	1	(0)
- * Club domestic league appearances and goals as of 5 August 2015

Pál Szalma (born 12 March 1982 in Vásárosnamény) is a Hungarian association football goalkeeper. He currently plays for Balmazújvárosi FC.
