= Viktor Farkas =

Hungarian football player

Personal information
- Full name: Viktor Farkas
- Date of birth: 5 October 1978 (age 48)
- Place of birth: Pyongyang, North Korea
- Height: 1.86 m (6 ft 1 in)
- Position: Defender

Team information
- Current team: Dunaújváros
- Number: 6

Youth career
- 1992–1995: BVSC Budapest
- 1995–1998: MTK Budapest

Senior career*
Years	Team	Apps	(Gls)
1998–2000	MTK	9	(1)
2000–2001	BKV Előre		(0)
2001–2002	Tatabánya		(0)
2002–2004	Haladás	48	(0)
2004–2005	Pápa	22	(0)
2004	→ Honvéd (loan)	5	(0)
2005–2007	Diósgyőr	55	(5)
2007–2012	Tatabánya	111	(8)
2012	Vecsés	15	(0)
2012–	Dunaújváros	54	(0)
- * Club domestic league appearances and goals as of 7 December 2014

Viktor Farkas (born 5 October 1978 in Pyongyang) is a Hungarian football player who currently plays for Dunaújváros PASE.
