= István Sipeki =

Hungarian footballer

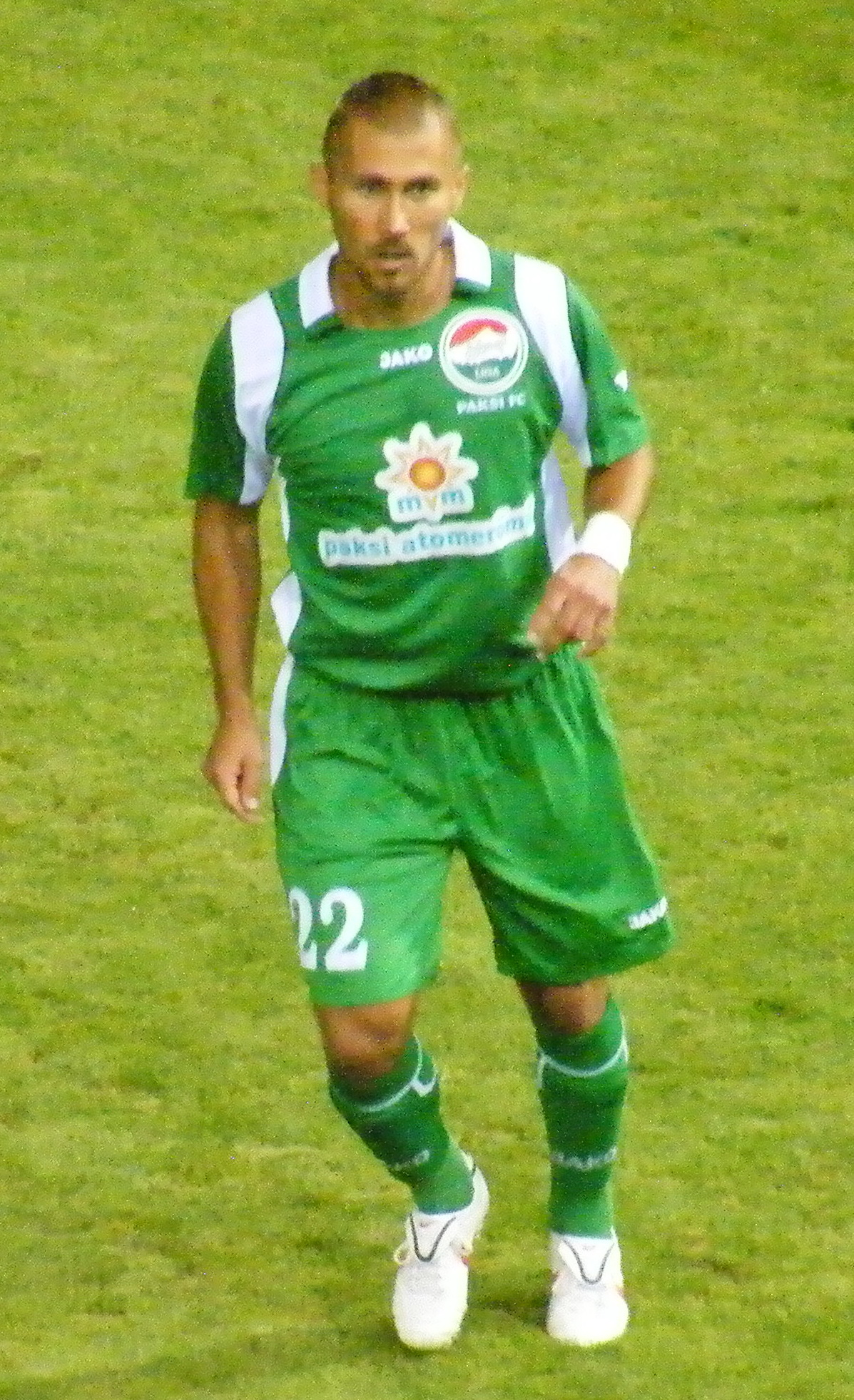

Personal information
- Full name: István Sipeki
- Date of birth: 17 February 1979 (age 47)
- Place of birth: Eger, Hungary
- Height: 1.67 m (5 ft 5 1/2 in)
- Position: Midfielder

Youth career
- 1993–1996: Eger

Senior career*
| Years | Team | Apps | (Gls) |
| 1996–2000 | Vác | 67 | (4) |
| 2000–2002 | Videoton | 33 | (0) |
| 2002–2004 | Siófok | 31 | (0) |
| 2004–2008 | Diósgyőr | 98 | (13) |
| 2008 | Panachaiki | ? | (?) |
| 2008–2013 | Paks | 121 | (3) |
| 2013–2014 | Szolnok | 29 | (0) |
| 2015 | Veresegyház VSK | | |
| 2015–2017 | Vác FC | 27 | (1) |
- * Club domestic league appearances and goals

István Sipeki (born 17 February 1979 in Eger) is a Hungarian football player who last played for Vác FC.
