= 2011–12 MTK Budapest FC season =

MTK Budapest FC
2011–12 season
- Chairman: Tamás Deutsch
- Manager: József Garami
- Stadium: Hidegkuti Nándor Stadion
- NB II: Winner
- Hungarian Cup: Runners-up
- League Cup: Quarter-final
Home colours	Away colours

The 2011–12 season will be MTK Budapest FC's 5th competitive season, 1st consecutive season in the OTP Bank Liga and 123rd year in existence as a football club.

== First team squad ==
Note: Flags indicate national team as defined under FIFA eligibility rules; some limited exceptions apply. Players may hold more than one non-FIFA nationality.

No.	Pos.	Nation	Player
1	GK	HUN	Lajos Hegedűs
2	MF	HUN	András Gál
3	DF	HUN	Sándor Hajdú
4	DF	HUN	Dániel Vadnai
5	DF	HUN	Dávid Csikortás
7	MF	HUN	László Zsidai
8	FW	HUN	Norbert Csiki
9	FW	HUN	András Pál
11	DF	HUN	Szilveszter Hangya
11	MF	HUN	Tibor Ladányi
12	DF	HUN	Dávid Kálnoki-Kis
13	DF	HUN	Adrián Szekeres
14	DF	HUN	Dávid Kelemen
15	FW	HUN	Norbert Könyves
16	MF	HUN	Zsolt Pölöskei
17	FW	HUN	Patrik Vass
17	FW	HUN	Dániel Gera
18	DF	HUN	Barnabás Bese
18	FW	HUN	Krisztián Németh
18	MF	HUN	András Pintér

No.	Pos.	Nation	Player
19	MF	HUN	József Kanta
20	DF	SRB	Dragan Vukmir
21	FW	HUN	Marcell Molnár
22	MF	AUS	Sasa Macura
22	FW	HUN	Dávid Asztalos
23	MF	HUN	Ádám Szabó
24	DF	HUN	Patrik Poór
24	MF	HUN	Ádám Hajdú
25	MF	HUN	Márk Nikházi
26	GK	HUN	György Scheilinger
27	FW	HUN	Richárd Frank
28	GK	ITA	Federico Groppioni
30	MF	HUN	Bence Zámbó
30	FW	HUN	Patrik Tischler
39	DF	JAM	Rafe Wolfe
91	FW	HUN	Ádám Balajti (loan from Debrecen)
—	FW	HUN	Tamás Hujber

== Transfers ==
=== Summer ===
In: Note: Flags indicate national team as defined under FIFA eligibility rules; some limited exceptions apply. Players may hold more than one non-FIFA nationality.

No.	Pos.	Nation	Player
—	FW	HUN	Norbert Csiki (from youth sector)
—	MF	HUN	Zsolt Pölöskei (from youth sector)
—	FW	HUN	Patrik Vass (from youth sector)
—	FW	HUN	Krisztián Németh (from (Greece) Olympiacos)
—	FW	HUN	Ádám Balajti (loan from Debrecen)
—	MF	HUN	László Zsidai (loan return from (Netherlands) Volendam)
—	MF	HUN	Gábor Nagy (loan return from Szombathelyi Haladás)

Out: Note: Flags indicate national team as defined under FIFA eligibility rules; some limited exceptions apply. Players may hold more than one non-FIFA nationality.

No.	Pos.	Nation	Player
—	MF	HUN	Gábor Nagy (to Szombathelyi Haladás)
—	FW	HUN	Gábor Urbán (to Kecskemét)
—	MF	MNE	Dejan Vukadinović (to Kecskemét)
—	FW	HUN	Márton Eppel (to (Netherlands) NEC Nijmegen)
—	FW	HUN	Ádám Hrepka (loan to Paks)
—	DF	HUN	László Sütő (loan to Vasas)
—	FW	HUN	Balázs Batizi-Pócsi (loan to Nyíregyháza)
—	GK	HUN	Zoltán Szatmári
—	MF	HUN	Bence Zámbó (loan return to Győr)

=== Winter ===
In: Note: Flags indicate national team as defined under FIFA eligibility rules; some limited exceptions apply. Players may hold more than one non-FIFA nationality.

No.	Pos.	Nation	Player
—	FW	HUN	Ádám Balajti (from Debrecen)
—	DF	HUN	László Sütő (loan return from Vasas)
—	MF	HUN	Péter Németh (loan return from Budaörs)

Out: Note: Flags indicate national team as defined under FIFA eligibility rules; some limited exceptions apply. Players may hold more than one non-FIFA nationality.

No.	Pos.	Nation	Player
—	FW	HUN	Krisztián Németh (to (Netherlands) Waalwijk)
—	MF	HUN	Máté Pátkai (to Győr)
—	MF	HUN	Ádám Szabó (loan to Mezőkövesd)
—	DF	HUN	László Sütő (released)

== Competitions ==
=== Overview ===
Competition	First match	Last match	Starting round	Final position	Record							
Competition	First match	Last match	Starting round	Final position	Pld	W	D	L	GF	GA	GD	Win %
Nemzeti Bajnokság II	20 August 2011	3 June 2012	Matchday 1	Winner	30	21	6	3	67	20	+47	70.00
Hungarian Cup	13 August 2011	1 May 2012	Round of 128	Runners-up	10	7	1	2	25	9	+16	70.00
League Cup	31 August 2011	7 March 2012	Group stage	Quarter-final	8	3	3	2	8	8	+0	37.50
Total					48	31	10	7	100	37	+63	64.58

Last updated: 3 June 2012
Source: Competitions

=== Nemzeti Bajnokság II ===
==== League table ====
Pos	Team	Pld	W	D	L	GF	GA	GD	Pts	Promotion or relegation
1	MTK Budapest (P)	30	21	6	3	67	20	+47	67 (Note: MTK Budapest were deducted 2 points.)	Promotion to Nemzeti Bajnokság I and qualification to Europa League first qualifying round (Note: As the 2011–12 Hungarian Cup winners, Debrecen qualified for the Champions League that year, their Europa League berth was carried down to finalists, MTK Budapest.)
2	Kozármisleny	30	17	4	9	50	30	+20	55	
3	Gyirmót	30	15	7	8	50	43	+7	52	
4	Ajka	30	14	8	8	48	34	+14	50	
5	Tatabánya	30	15	6	9	50	34	+16	49 (Note: Tatabánya were deducted 2 points.)	

Source: soccerway.com
Rules for classification: 1st points; 2nd overall wins; 3rd goal difference; 4th goals scored
(P) Promoted

==== Results summary ====
Overall								Home						Away					
Pld	W	D	L	GF	GA	GD	Pts	W	D	L	GF	GA	GD	W	D	L	GF	GA	GD
30	21	6	3	67	20	+47	69	9	4	2	35	9	+26	12	2	1	32	11	+21

Last updated: 3 June 2012.
Source: Soccerway

==== Results by round ====
Round	1	2	3	4	5	6	7	8	9	10	11	12	13	14	15	16	17	18	19	20	21	22	23	24	25	26	27	28	29	30
Ground	H	A	H	A	H	A	H	H	A	H	A	H	A	H	A	A	H	A	H	A	H	A	A	H	A	H	A	H	A	H
Result	W	W	W	W	L	W	W	W	W	W	W	W	W	D	D	W	D	W	D	W	W	W	W	W	W	L	D	W	L	D
Position	7	4	2	2	2	1	1	1	1	1	1	1	1	1	1	1	1	1	1	1	1	1	1	1	1	1	1	1	1	1

Updated to match(es) played on 3 June 2012. Source: Matches
A = Away; H = Home; W = Win; D = Draw; L = Loss

==== Matches ====
20 August 2011 1	MTK Budapest	1–0	Budaörs	Budapest
17:30 CEST	Tischler 40'	Report		Stadium: Hidegkuti Nándor Stadion; Attendance: 600; Referee: Balázs Berke

28 August 2011 2	Puskás Akadémia	1–2	MTK Budapest	Felcsút
17:30 CEST	Szakály 90'	Report	Zsidai 26'; Tischler 67'	Stadium: Városi Sportpálya; Attendance: 500; Referee: Péter Solymosi

3 September 2011 3	MTK Budapest	2–0	BKV Előre	Budapest
16:30 CEST	Kanta 76'; Könyves 82'	Report		Stadium: Hidegkuti Nándor Stadion; Attendance: 500; Referee: Roland Veizer

10 September 2011 4	Gyirmót	1–3	MTK Budapest	Győr
19:00 CEST	Weitner 84'	Report	Wolfe 8'; Frank 28'; Tischler 67'	Stadium: Ménfői úti Stadion; Attendance: 1,100; Referee: Tamás Bognár

17 September 2011 5	MTK Budapest	1–2	Ajka	Budapest
16:00 CEST	Könyves 85'	Report	Subicz 56'; Mihalecz 65'	Stadium: Hidegkuti Nándor Stadion; Attendance: 600; Referee: Balázs Böcskei

24 September 2011 6	Kozármisleny	3–5	MTK Budapest	Kozármisleny
16:00 CEST	Nagy 12'; Rácz 37'; Ato 66'	Report	Kanta 4'; Nikházi 48'; Frank 53'; Tischler 77'; Wolfe 90'	Stadium: Városi Stadion; Attendance: 400; Referee: Tamás Bognár

1 October 2011 7	MTK Budapest	4–0	Dunaújváros	Budapest
15:00 CEST	Ladányi 13'; Pál 29'; Nikházi 41'; Tischler 90'	Report		Stadium: Hidegkuti Nándor Stadion; Attendance: 500; Referee: Ferenc Karakó

9 October 2011 8	MTK Budapest	5–1	Veszprém	Budapest
15:00 CEST	Tischler 3'; Nikházi 8'; Csiki 31', 66', 90'	Report	Alex 62'	Stadium: Hidegkuti Nándor Stadion; Attendance: 500; Referee: Ádám Radványi

16 October 2011 9	Paks II	0–1	MTK Budapest	Paks
14:30 CEST		Report	Csiki 88'	Stadium: Fehérvári úti Stadion; Attendance: 300; Referee: Dániel Becséri

22 October 2011 10	MTK Budapest	1–0	Tatabánya	Budapest
14:30 CEST	Csiki 68'	Report		Stadium: Hidegkuti Nándor Stadion; Attendance: 500; Referee: Gábor Oláh

29 October 2011 11	Baja	1–4	MTK Budapest	Baja
14:30 CET	Micskó 63'	Report	Nikházi 28'; Kanta 34'; Wolfe 59'; Tischler 86'	Stadium: Városi Sporttelep; Attendance: 600; Referee: Sándor Andó-Szabó

5 November 2011 12	MTK Budapest	4–0	Sopron	Budapest
13:30 CEST	Frank 48'; Németh 58'; Pölöskei 79', 90'	Report		Stadium: Hidegkuti Nándor Stadion; Attendance: 600; Referee: Krisztián Pánczél

23 November 2011 13	Ferencváros II	0–1	MTK Budapest	Budapest
13:00 CET		Report	Tischler 89'	Stadium: Albert Flórián Stadion; Attendance: 150; Referee: János Takács

19 November 2011 14	MTK Budapest	0–0	Szigetszentmiklós	Budapest
13:00 CEST		Report		Stadium: Hidegkuti Nándor Stadion; Attendance: 500; Referee: Ferenc Karakó

27 November 2011 15	Győr II	0–0	MTK Budapest	Győr
13:00 CET		Report		Stadium: ETO Park; Attendance: 300; Referee: Dániel Becséri

9 May 2012 16	Budaörs	0–3	MTK Budapest	Budaörs
17:30 CEST		Report	Kanta 7'; Tischler 63'; Balajti 80'	Stadium: Városi Stadion; Attendance: 500; Referee: Ádám Radványi

3 March 2012 17	MTK Budapest	1–1	Puskás Akadémia	Budapest
14:30 CET	Kálnoki-Kis 57'	Report	Perić 9'	Stadium: Hidegkuti Nándor Stadion; Attendance: 500; Referee: Gergely Szőts

11 March 2012 18	BKV Előre	0–4	MTK Budapest	Budaörs
14:30 CET		Report	Tischler 18', 26'; Frank 31'; Könyves 52'	Stadium: BKV Előre Stadion; Attendance: 400; Referee: József Berger

18 March 2012 19	MTK Budapest	1–1	Gyirmót	Budapest
15:00 CET	Kanta 74'	Report	Kardos 81'	Stadium: Hidegkuti Nándor Stadion; Attendance: 1,200; Referee: Tamás Bognár

24 March 2012 20	Ajka	0–1	MTK Budapest	Ajka
15:00 CET		Report	Tischler 56'	Stadium: Városi Stadion; Attendance: 400; Referee: Csaba Pintér

1 April 2012 21	MTK Budapest	1–0	Kozármisleny	Budapest
16:00 CEST	Nikházi 78'	Report		Stadium: Hidegkuti Nándor Stadion; Attendance: 800; Referee: Dániel Becséri

7 April 2012 22	Dunaújváros	1–2	MTK Budapest	Dunaújváros
16:30 CEST	Kocsis 51'	Report	Tischler 37'; Ladányi 38'	Stadium: Dunaferr Arena; Attendance: 400; Referee: Balázs Böcskei

14 April 2012 23	Veszprém	0–1	MTK Budapest	Veszprém
16:30 CEST		Report	Tischler 68'	Stadium: Városi Stadion; Attendance: 600; Referee: Balázs Berke

21 April 2012 24	MTK Budapest	5–0	Paks II	Budapest
17:00 CEST	Nikházi 16'; Vass 26'; Balajti 47', 86'; Kanta 80'	Report		Stadium: Hidegkuti Nándor Stadion; Attendance: 500; Referee: Krisztián Pánczél

28 April 2012 25	Tatabánya	1–3	MTK Budapest	Tatabánya
17:00 CEST	Farkas 17'	Report	Könyves 29', 50'; Vass 90+1'	Stadium: Városi Stadion; Attendance: 800; Referee: János Takács

5 May 2012 26	MTK Budapest	2–3	Baja	Budapest
17:30 CEST	Kanta 12'; Tischler	Report	Čović 32', 37'; Lógó 70'	Stadium: Hidegkuti Nándor Stadion; Attendance: 1,000; Referee: Szabolcs Szilasi

12 May 2012 27	Sopron	1–1	MTK Budapest	Sopron
18:30 CEST	Beršnjak 27'	Report	Kanta 24'	Stadium: Káposztás utcai Stadion; Attendance: 400; Referee: Dániel Becséri

19 May 2012 28	MTK Budapest	7–1	Ferencváros II	Budapest
17:30 CEST	Balajti 6', 36', 63', 71'; Vass 13'; Kálnoki-Kis 42'; Hajdú 82'	Report	Vass 38'	Stadium: Hidegkuti Nándor Stadion; Attendance: 500; Referee: Ferenc Karakó

26 May 2012 29	Szigetszentmiklós	2–1	MTK Budapest	Szigetszentmiklós
18:00 CEST	Hullám 54', 80'	Report	Pintér 83'	Stadium: Városi Sporttelep; Attendance: 300; Referee: József Berger

3 June 2012 30	MTK Budapest	0–0	Győr II	Budapest
15:30 CEST		Report		Stadium: Hidegkuti Nándor Stadion; Attendance: 600; Referee: István Mészáros

=== Hungarian Cup ===
13 August 2011 Round of 128	Diósd	0–4	MTK Budapest	Diósd
17:00 CEST		Report	Kanta 25'; Molnár 30'; Tischler 47'; Könyves 82'	Stadium: Városi Sporttelep; Referee: Krisztián Pánczél

21 September 2011 Round of 64	MTK Budapest	4–0	Rákospalota	Budapest
15:00 CEST	Molnár 20'; Csiki 22'; Kanta 33'; Frank 37'	Report		Stadium: Hidegkuti Nándor Stadion; Attendance: 100; Referee: József Erdős

26 October 2011 Round of 32	Balmazújváros	1–2	MTK Budapest	Balmazújváros
14:00 CEST	Urbin 49'	Report	Kanta 53'; Tischler 88'	Stadium: Balmazújvárosi Városi Sportpálya; Attendance: 800; Referee: Ádám Németh

30 November 2011 Round of 16 (L1)	MTK Budapest	0–1	Pécs	Budapest
17:30 CET		Report	Regedei 66'	Stadium: Hidegkuti Nándor Stadion; Attendance: 400; Referee: Zoltán Iványi

3 December 2011 Round of 16 (L2)	Pécs	1–2 (2–2 (a) agg.)	MTK Budapest	Pécs
16:00 CET	Nagy 89'	Report	Vadnai 15'; Németh 68'	Stadium: Stadion PMFC; Attendance: 2,000; Referee: Gábor Oláh

25 February 2012 Quarter-final (L1)	Békéscsaba	0–3	MTK Budapest	Békéscsaba
14:00 CET		Report	Tischler 15'; Könyves 32'; Kanta 78'	Stadium: Kórház utcai Stadion; Attendance: 1,500; Referee: Roland Veizer

14 March 2012 Quarter-final (L2)	MTK Budapest	3–0 (6–0 agg.)	Békéscsaba	Budapest
17:30 CET	Könyves 33'; Gál 70'; Molnár 88'	Report		Stadium: Hidegkuti Nándor Stadion; Attendance: 300; Referee: Norbert Kiss

21 March 2012 Semi-final (L1)	MTK Budapest	2–3	Videoton	Budapest
17:00 CET	Könyves 6', 26'	Report	Nikolić 52', 85'; Torghelle 63'	Stadium: Hidegkuti Nándor Stadion; Attendance: 600; Referee: Mihály Fábián

10 April 2012 Semi-final (L2)	Videoton	0–2 (3–4 agg.)	MTK Budapest	Székesfehérvár
18:00 CEST		Report	Kanta 22'; Tischler 31'	Stadium: Sóstói Stadion; Attendance: 1,200; Referee: Ádám Farkas

1 May 2012 Final	MTK Budapest	3–3 (7–8 p)	Debrecen	Budapest
18:00 CEST	Könyves 45'; Ladányi 62'; Zsidai 87'	Report	Bouadla 51'; Szakály 55', 89'	Stadium: Puskás Ferenc Stadion; Attendance: 5,000; Referee: Zsolt Szabó
	Penalties
	Vukmir (penalty scored); Zsidai (penalty scored); Vass (penalty scored); Wolfe (penalty missed); Kanta (penalty scored); Szekeres (penalty scored); Pál (penalty scored); Könyves (penalty scored); Kálnoki-Kis (penalty missed)		Szakály (penalty scored); Nagy (penalty scored); Bouadla (penalty scored); Lucas (penalty scored); Coulibaly (penalty missed); Korhut (penalty scored); Šimac (penalty scored); Varga (penalty scored); Mészáros (penalty scored)

=== League Cup ===
==== Group stage ====
Pos	Team	Pld	W	D	L	GF	GA	GD	Pts	Qualification
1	Videoton	6	3	2	1	11	7	+4	11	Advance to knockout phase
2	MTK Budapest	6	3	2	1	6	5	+1	11	Advance to knockout phase
3	Budapest Honvéd	6	2	1	3	8	8	0	7	
4	Gyirmót	6	1	1	4	9	11	−2	4	

Rules for classification: 1) points; 2) goal difference; 3) number of goals scored.

31 August 2011 1	MTK Budapest	1–0	Videoton	Budapest
17:00 CEST	Könyves 73'	Report		Stadium: Hidegkuti Nándor Stadion; Referee: (Chile) Alvaro Garcia

7 September 2011 2	Budapest Honvéd	0–2	MTK Budapest	Budapest
17:30 CEST		Report	Kelemen 28'; Frank 41'	Stadium: Bozsik József Stadion; Referee: László Lovas

5 October 2011 3	MTK Budapest	2–1	Gyirmót	Budapest
15:00 CEST	Tischler 54'; Csiki 61'	Report	Tóth 69'	Stadium: Hidegkuti Nándor Stadion; Referee: Szabolcs Fenyvesi

12 October 2011 4	Gyirmót	1–1	MTK Budapest	Győr
17:00 CEST	Vukmir 45' (o.g.)	Report	Vass 79'	Stadium: Ménfői úti Stadion; Referee: Balázs Berke

9 November 2011 5	MTK Budapest	0–3	Budapest Honvéd	Budapest
13:30 CET		Report	Danilo 21'; Torghelle 37'; Abass 89'	Stadium: Hidegkuti Nándor Stadion; Referee: Katalin Kulcsár

16 November 2011 6	Videoton	0–0	MTK Budapest	Székesfehérvár
16:00 CEST		Report		Stadium: Sóstói Stadion; Referee: Balázs Berke

==== Quarter-final ====
21 February 2012 Quarter-final (L1)	MTK Budapest	2–2	Kecskemét	Budapest
13:00 CET	Tischler 64'; Könyves 67'	Report	Bori 4'; Litsingi 71'	Stadium: Promontor utcai Stadion; Referee: Ádám Radványi

7 March 2012 Quarter-final (L2)	Kecskemét	1–0 (3–2 agg.)	MTK Budapest	Kecskemét
18:00 CET	Litsingi 74'	Report		Stadium: Széktói Stadion; Referee: Zsolt Szabó

=== Appearances and goals ===
Last updated on 3 June 2012.

No.	Pos	Nat	Player	Total		Nemzeti Bajnokság II		Hungarian Cup		League Cup	
No.	Pos	Nat	Player	Apps	Goals	Apps	Goals	Apps	Goals	Apps	Goals
1	GK	(Hungary) HUN	Lajos Hegedűs	32	-20	28	-17	4	-3	0	-0
2	MF	(Hungary) HUN	András Gál	23	1	13	0	2	1	8	0
3	DF	(Hungary) HUN	Sándor Hajdú	18	0	7	0	4	0	7	0
4	DF	(Hungary) HUN	Dániel Vadnai	35	1	19	0	9	1	7	0
5	DF	(Hungary) HUN	Dávid Csikortás	2	0	2	0	0	0	0	0
7	MF	(Hungary) HUN	László Zsidai	27	2	19	1	6	1	2	0
8	FW	(Hungary) HUN	Norbert Csiki	19	7	13	5	3	1	3	1
9	FW	(Hungary) HUN	András Pál	17	1	13	1	4	0	0	0
11	MF	(Hungary) HUN	Tibor Ladányi	31	3	18	2	7	1	6	0
12	DF	(Hungary) HUN	Dávid Kálnoki-Kis	35	2	25	2	9	0	1	0
13	DF	(Hungary) HUN	Adrián Szekeres	44	0	28	0	10	0	6	0
14	DF	(Hungary) HUN	Dávid Kelemen	11	1	4	0	0	0	7	1
15	FW	(Hungary) HUN	Norbert Könyves	33	13	18	5	9	6	6	2
16	MF	(Hungary) HUN	Zsolt Pölöskei	13	2	9	2	1	0	3	0
17	FW	(Hungary) HUN	Patrik Vass	33	4	20	3	7	0	6	1
19	MF	(Hungary) HUN	József Kanta	41	13	27	8	8	5	6	0
20	DF	(Serbia) SRB	Dragan Vukmir	35	0	21	0	9	0	5	0
21	FW	(Hungary) HUN	Marcell Molnár	17	3	8	0	4	3	5	0
22	MF	(Australia) AUS	Sasa Macura	12	0	4	0	2	0	6	0
23	FW	(Hungary) HUN	Ádám Balajti	16	7	13	7	3	0	0	0
24	MF	(Hungary) HUN	Ádám Hajdú	2	1	2	1	0	0	0	0
25	MF	(Hungary) HUN	Márk Nikházi	32	6	20	6	5	0	7	0
26	GK	(Hungary) HUN	György Scheilinger	1	-1	1	-1	0	-0	0	-0
27	FW	(Hungary) HUN	Richárd Frank	36	6	19	4	9	1	8	1
28	GK	(Italy) ITA	Federico Groppioni	16	-16	2	-2	6	-6	8	-8
30	FW	(Hungary) HUN	Patrik Tischler	37	21	25	15	6	4	6	2
39	DF	(Jamaica) JAM	Rafe Wolfe	38	3	25	3	8	0	5	0
Youth players:
	DF	(Hungary) HUN	Szilveszter Hangya	2	0	2	0	0	0	0	0
	MF	(Hungary) HUN	András Pintér	2	1	2	1	0	0	0	0
	DF	(Hungary) HUN	Patrik Poór	1	0	1	0	0	0	0	0
	DF	(Hungary) HUN	Barnabás Bese	3	0	2	0	0	0	1	0
	FW	(Hungary) HUN	Dániel Gera	1	0	1	0	0	0	0	0
	MF	(Hungary) HUN	Krisztián Póti	1	0	0	0	0	0	1	0
	MF	(Hungary) HUN	Bence Zámbó	1	0	0	0	0	0	1	0
	DF	(Hungary) HUN	Milán Földes	1	0	0	0	0	0	1	0
	MF	(Hungary) HUN	István Kállai	1	0	0	0	0	0	1	0
	MF	(Hungary) HUN	Gergely Tóth	0	0	0	0	0	0	0	0
	MF	(Hungary) HUN	Tamás Hujber	0	0	0	0	0	0	0	0
	DF	(Hungary) HUN	Dávid Asztalos	0	0	0	0	0	0	0	0
	MF	(Hungary) HUN	Dávid Zámbó	0	0	0	0	0	0	0	0
Out to loan:
23	MF	(Hungary) HUN	Ádám Szabó	0	0	0	0	0	0	0	0
Players no longer at the club:
18	FW	(Hungary) HUN	Krisztián Németh	3	2	1	1	2	1	0	0

=== Top scorers ===
Includes all competitive matches. The list is sorted by shirt number when total goals are equal.

Last updated on 3 June 2012

Position	Nation	Number	Name	OTP Bank Liga	Hungarian Cup	League Cup	Total
1	(Hungary)	30	Patrik Tischler	15	4	2	21
2	(Hungary)	19	József Kanta	8	5	0	13
3	(Hungary)	15	Norbert Könyves	5	6	2	13
4	(Hungary)	23	Ádám Balajti	7	0	0	7
5	(Hungary)	8	Norbert Csiki	5	1	1	7
6	(Hungary)	25	Márk Nikházi	6	0	0	6
7	(Hungary)	27	Richárd Frank	4	1	1	6
8	(Hungary)	17	Patrik Vass	3	0	1	4
9	(Jamaica)	39	Rafe Wolfe	3	0	0	3
10	(Hungary)	11	Tibor Ladányi	2	1	0	3
11	(Hungary)	21	Marcell Molnár	0	3	0	3
12	(Hungary)	16	Zsolt Pölöskei	2	0	0	2
13	(Hungary)	12	Dávid Kálnoki-Kis	2	0	0	2
14	(Hungary)	18	Krisztián Németh	1	1	0	2
15	(Hungary)	7	László Zsidai	1	1	0	2
16	(Hungary)	9	András Pál	1	0	0	1
17	(Hungary)	24	Ádám Hajdú	1	0	0	1
18	(Hungary)	TBA	András Pintér	1	0	0	1
19	(Hungary)	4	Dániel Vadnai	0	1	0	1
20	(Hungary)	2	András Gál	0	1	0	1
21	(Hungary)	14	Dávid Kelemen	0	0	1	1
/	/	/	Own Goals	0	0	0	0
			TOTALS	67	25	8	100

=== Disciplinary record ===
Includes all competitive matches. Players with 1 card or more included only.

Last updated on 3 June 2012

Position	Nation	Number	Name	OTP Bank Liga		Hungarian Cup		League Cup		Total (Hu Total)	
Position	Nation	Number	Name	Yellow card	Red card	Yellow card	Red card	Yellow card	Red card	Yellow card	Red card
MF	(Hungary)	2	András Gál	3	0	1	0	2	0	6 (3)	0 (0)
DF	(Hungary)	3	Sándor Hajdú	0	1	0	0	0	0	0 (0)	1 (1)
DF	(Hungary)	4	Dániel Vadnai	1	0	1	0	0	0	2 (1)	0 (0)
DF	(Hungary)	5	Dávid Csikortás	2	0	0	0	0	0	2 (2)	0 (0)
MF	(Hungary)	7	László Zsidai	0	0	2	1	1	0	3 (0)	1 (0)
FW	(Hungary)	9	András Pál	1	0	0	0	0	0	1 (1)	0 (0)
MF	(Hungary)	11	Tibor Ladányi	0	0	1	1	3	0	4 (0)	1 (0)
DF	(Hungary)	12	Dávid Kálnoki-Kis	4	0	3	0	0	0	7 (4)	0 (0)
DF	(Hungary)	13	Adrián Szekeres	1	0	3	0	1	0	5 (2)	0 (0)
FW	(Hungary)	15	Norbert Könyves	2	0	1	0	0	1	3 (2)	1 (0)
MF	(Hungary)	16	Zsolt Pölöskei	0	0	1	0	0	0	1 (0)	0 (0)
FW	(Hungary)	17	Patrik Vass	1	0	0	0	0	0	1 (1)	0 (0)
FW	(Hungary)	18	Krisztián Németh	0	0	1	0	0	0	1 (0)	0 (0)
MF	(Hungary)	19	József Kanta	3	0	2	0	2	0	7 (3)	0 (0)
DF	(Serbia)	20	Dragan Vukmir	8	0	2	0	2	0	12 (8)	0 (0)
FW	(Hungary)	21	Marcell Molnár	1	0	1	0	1	0	3 (1)	0 (0)
MF	(Australia)	22	Sasa Macura	0	1	0	0	1	0	1 (0)	1 (1)
FW	(Hungary)	23	Ádám Balajti	1	0	1	0	0	0	2 (1)	0 (0)
MF	(Hungary)	25	Márk Nikházi	6	0	1	1	0	0	7 (6)	1 (0)
FW	(Hungary)	27	Richárd Frank	1	0	2	0	0	0	3 (1)	0 (0)
GK	(Italy)	28	Federico Groppioni	0	1	0	0	0	0	0 (0)	1 (1)
FW	(Hungary)	30	Patrik Tischler	1	0	0	1	1	0	2 (1)	1 (0)
DF	(Jamaica)	39	Rafe Wolfe	5	0	1	1	0	0	6 (5)	1 (0)
			TOTALS	41	3	24	5	14	1	79 (41)	9 (3)

=== Clean sheets ===
Last updated on 3 June 2012

Position	Nation	Number	Name	OTP Bank Liga	Hungarian Cup	League Cup	Total
1	(Hungary)	1	Lajos Hegedűs	16	3	0	19
2	(Italy)	28	Federico Groppioni	0	2	3	5
3	(Hungary)	26	György Scheilinger	0	0	0	0
			TOTALS	16	5	3	24
