= 2010–11 MTK Budapest FC season =

MTK Budapest FC
2010–11 season
- Chairman: László Domonyai
- Manager: József Garami
- NB 1: 15th (relegated)
- Hungarian Cup: Quarter-final
- Hungarian League Cup: Group stage
- Top goalscorer: League: Patrik Tischler (12); All: Patrik Tischler (13)

The 2010–11 season will be MTK Budapest FC's 102nd competitive season, 16th consecutive season in the Nemzeti Bajnokság I and 122nd year in existence as a football club.

== Team kit and logo ==
The team kits for the 2010–11 season are produced by Jako and the shirt sponsor is Fotex. The home kit is purple and white colour and the away kit is white colour.

Home	Away

== Transfers ==
=== Summer ===
In: Note: Flags indicate national team as defined under FIFA eligibility rules; some limited exceptions apply. Players may hold more than one non-FIFA nationality.

No.	Pos.	Nation	Player
1	GK	HUN	Lajos Hegedűs (loan return from Pécs)
2	MF	HUN	András Gál (from youth sector)
5	DF	HUN	László Sütő (loan return from Pécs)
7	MF	MNE	Dejan Vukadinovic (from Diósgyőr)
12	DF	HUN	Dávid Kálnoki-Kis (from youth sector)
14	DF	HUN	Dávid Kelemen (from youth sector)
16	MF	HUN	Máté Skriba (loan from Szombathely)
24	DF	HUN	Bence Zámbó (loan from Győr)
30	FW	HUN	Patrik Tischler (from youth sector)
—	FW	HUN	András Gosztonyi (loan return from (Italy) Bari)
—	MF	HUN	Gábor Bori (loan return from Kecskemét)
—	DF	MNE	Marko Radulović (loan return from (Montenegro) Petrovac)
—	MF	HUN	Tamás Kecskés (loan return from Pécs)

Out: Note: Flags indicate national team as defined under FIFA eligibility rules; some limited exceptions apply. Players may hold more than one non-FIFA nationality.

No.	Pos.	Nation	Player
1	GK	HUN	Levente Szántai (to Mezőkövesd)
5	DF	HUN	Béla Balogh (to Kecskemét)
5	DF	HUN	András Vági (to (Switzerland) Aarau)
7	DF	HUN	Sándor Hidvégi (to Videoton)
8	MF	HUN	András Gosztonyi (to Videoton)
8	MF	HUN	Tamás Kecskés (to Siófok)
9	FW	HUN	Ádám Hrepka (loan to Vasas)
10	FW	HUN	János Lázok (loan return to Vasas)
11	FW	HUN	Vilmos Melczer (to Budaörs)
16	MF	HUN	Péter Bonifert (to Szigetszentmiklós)
17	MF	HUN	László Zsidai (loan to (Netherlands) Volendam)
20	GK	SRB	Nenad Filipović (loan return to Videoton)
22	DF	HUN	István Rodenbücher (to Ferencváros)
23	DF	MNE	Marko Radulović (to (Montenegro) Titograd)
27	DF	HUN	Ádám Pintér (to (Spain) Real Zaragoza)
32	MF	HUN	Lóránd Szatmári (loan return to (Italy) Reggina)
33	GK	HUN	Viktor Szentpéteri (to (Malta) Sliema Wanderers)
77	MF	HUN	Tamás Kulcsár (loan return to (Poland) Polonia Warsaw)

=== Winter ===
In: Note: Flags indicate national team as defined under FIFA eligibility rules; some limited exceptions apply. Players may hold more than one non-FIFA nationality.

No.	Pos.	Nation	Player
27	FW	HUN	Richárd Frank (loan from Újpest II)
28	GK	ITA	Federico Groppioni (from (Italy) Manfredonia)
31	FW	HUN	Gábor Urbán (loan return from Paks)
33	FW	HUN	Ádám Hrepka (loan return from Vasas)
39	DF	JAM	Rafe Wolfe (from (Jamaica) Portmore United)
—	FW	HUN	Balázs Batizi-Pócsi (from Nyíregyháza)

Out: Note: Flags indicate national team as defined under FIFA eligibility rules; some limited exceptions apply. Players may hold more than one non-FIFA nationality.

No.	Pos.	Nation	Player
—	MF	HUN	Dániel Hauser (to Tápiószecső)
16	MF	HUN	Máté Skriba (loan return to Szombathely)

== Club ==
=== Coaching staff ===
Position	Staff
Manager	(Hungary) József Garami
Head coach	(Hungary) András Cseh
Head coach	(Hungary) Sándor Fedor
Head coach	(Hungary) Tamás Petres
Head coach	(Hungary) (Greece) Teodoru Vaszilisz
Goalkeeping coach	(Hungary) Miklós Józsa
Goalkeeping coach	(Hungary) László Pleskó
Masseur	(Hungary) János Kiss
Masseur	(Hungary) István Molnár
Masseur	(Hungary) Szilárd Purger
Doctor	(Hungary) Dr. György Szilágyi
Reserve team manager	(Hungary) Zsolt Tamási

Last updated: 13 July 2010

=== Other information ===
General Manager	(Hungary) László Domonyai
Reserves president	(Hungary) Ferenc Bukor
Technical Leader	(Hungary) Sándor Schneider
Communication Leader	(Hungary) Judit Heves
Ground (capacity and dimensions)	Stadion Hidegkuti Nándor (7,515 / 105x68 meters)

Updated to match played 13 July 2010

== Squad ==
=== First-team squad ===
Updated 16 October 2010.

Note: Flags indicate national team as defined under FIFA eligibility rules; some limited exceptions apply. Players may hold more than one non-FIFA nationality.

No.	Pos.	Nation	Player
2	MF	HUN	András Gál
4	DF	HUN	Dániel Vadnai
5	DF	HUN	László Sütő
6	MF	HUN	Máté Pátkai
7	DF	MNE	Dejan Vukadinović
8	FW	HUN	Norbert Csiki
9	FW	HUN	András Pál
11	MF	HUN	Tibor Ladányi
12	DF	HUN	Dávid Kálnoki-Kis
13	DF	HUN	Adrián Szekeres
14	DF	HUN	Dávid Kelemen
15	FW	SRB	Norbert Könyves

No.	Pos.	Nation	Player
16	MF	HUN	Máté Skriba
17	FW	HUN	Márton Eppel
19	MF	HUN	József Kanta
20	DF	SRB	Dragan Vukmir
21	MF	HUN	Marcell Molnár
23	MF	HUN	Ádám Szabó
24	DF	HUN	Bence Zámbó (on loan from Győri ETO)
25	MF	HUN	Márk Nikházi
27	DF	HUN	Ádám Pintér
29	GK	HUN	Zoltán Szatmári
30	FW	HUN	Patrik Tischler

== Competitions ==
=== Overview ===
Competition	First match	Last match	Starting round	Final position	Record							
Competition	First match	Last match	Starting round	Final position	Pld	W	D	L	GF	GA	GD	Win %
Nemzeti Bajnokság I	31 July 2010	21 May 2011	Matchday 1	15th	29	8	6	15	35	49	−14	27.59
Hungarian Cup	22 September 2010	15 March 2011	Round of 64	Quarter-final	6	2	3	1	11	3	+8	33.33
League Cup	24 July 2010	8 December 2010	Group stage	Group stage	4	1	0	3	6	12	−6	25.00
Total					39	11	9	19	52	64	−12	28.21

Last updated: 21 May 2011
Source: Competitions

=== Nemzeti Bajnokság I ===
==== Classification ====
Pos	Team	Pld	W	D	L	GF	GA	GD	Pts	Qualification or relegation
12	Kecskemét	30	11	3	16	51	56	−5	36	Qualification for Europa League second qualifying round (Note: Kecskemét have qualified for the second qualifying round of the 2011–12 UEFA Europa League after winning the 2010–11 Hungarian Cup.)
13	Pápa	30	10	5	15	39	52	−13	35	
14	Siófok	30	8	10	12	29	41	−12	34	
15	MTK (R)	30	8	6	16	35	49	−14	30	Relegation to Nemzeti Bajnokság II
16	Szolnok (R)	30	5	6	19	26	56	−30	21	Relegation to Nemzeti Bajnokság II

Source: soccerway.com
Rules for classification: 1st points; 2nd overall wins; 3rd goal difference; 4th goals scored
(R) Relegated

==== Results summary ====
Overall								Home						Away					
Pld	W	D	L	GF	GA	GD	Pts	W	D	L	GF	GA	GD	W	D	L	GF	GA	GD
30	8	6	16	35	49	−14	30	6	2	7	23	25	−2	2	4	9	12	24	−12

Last updated: 21 May 2011.
Source: NB1

==== Results by round ====
Round	1	2	3	4	5	6	7	8	9	10	11	12	13	14	15	16	17	18	19	20	21	22	23	24	25	26	27	28	29	30
Ground	H	A	H	A	H	A	H	H	A	H	A	H	A	H	A	A	H	A	H	A	H	A	A	H	A	H	A	H	A	H
Result	W	W	L	D	W	D	W	L	L	D	L	L	L	W	D	L	W	L	D	L	L	D	L	L	L	W	L	L	W	L
Position	2	1	4	4	5	4	2	4	8	8	10	12	12	10	10	12	11	12	14	14	14	14	15	15	15	15	15	15	15	15

Updated to match(es) played on 21 May 2011. Source: Matches
A = Away; H = Home; W = Win; D = Draw; L = Loss

=== Matches ===
31 July 2010 1	MTK Budapest	4–2	Kecskemét	Budapest
19:00 CEST	Tischler 6'; Kanta 28'; Pintér 63'; Könyves 71'	Report	Litsingi 32'; Tököli 33'	Stadium: Hidegkuti Stadion; Attendance: 1,000; Referee: István Vad

7 August 2010 2	Budapest Honvéd	1–2	MTK Budapest	Budapest
17:30 CEST	Botiș 62'	Report	Kanta 10' (pen.); Tischler 73'	Stadium: Bozsik József Stadion; Attendance: 1,500; Referee: Zoltán Iványi

14 August 2010 3	MTK Budapest	0–3	Videoton	Budapest
17:30 CEST		Report	Alves 10', 51'; Vasiljević 65'	Stadium: Hidegkuti Stadion; Attendance: 1,500; Referee: Ferenc Bede

22 August 2010 4	Győr	1–1	MTK Budapest	Győr
20:00 CEST	Trajković 48'	Report	Kanta 28'	Stadium: ETO Park; Attendance: 2,500; Referee: János Takács

27 August 2010 5	MTK Budapest	1–0	Újpest	Budapest
19:00 CEST	Tischler 89'	Report		Stadium: Hidegkuti Stadion; Attendance: 1,800; Referee: Viktor Kassai

11 September 2010 6	BFC Siófok	0–0	MTK Budapest	Siófok
18:00 CEST		Report		Stadium: Révész Géza Stadion; Attendance: 500; Referee: Zsolt Szabó

16 September 2010 7	MTK Budapest	4–0	Vasas	Budapest
19:00 CEST	Tischler 18', 36' (pen.); Gál 28'; Pál 86'	Report		Stadium: Hidegkuti Stadion; Attendance: 1,000; Referee: János Takács

9 October 2010 8	MTK Budapest	0–2	Kaposvár	Budapest
17:00 CEST		Report	Perić 31'; Oláh 70'	Stadium: Hidegkuti Stadion; Attendance: 800; Referee: Mihály Fábián
Note: The original time of the match was interrupted due to bad weather on 25 September 2010.

1 October 2010 9	Ferencváros	3–0	MTK Budapest	Budapest
19:00 CEST	Sütő 8', 25' (o.g.); Csizmadia 84'	Report		Stadium: Stadion Albert Flórián; Attendance: 4,000; Referee: Zsolt Szabó

16 October 2010 10	MTK Budapest	0–0	Debrecen	Budapest
15:00 CEST		Report		Stadium: Hidegkuti Stadion; Attendance: 1,100; Referee: Viktor Kassai

23 October 2010 11	Szolnok	2–1	MTK Budapest	Szolnok
13:00 CEST	Stanišić 17'; Remili 68' (pen.)	Report	Patrik Tischler 50'	Stadium: Tiszaligeti Stadion; Attendance: 1,200; Referee: Ádám Németh

30 October 2010 12	MTK Budapest	3–4	Zalaegerszeg	Budapest
17:00 CET	Könyves 53'; Ladányi 64'; Eppel 84'	Report	Balázs 10'; Simon 34'; Rajcomar 42' (pen.); Panikvar 90'	Stadium: Hidegkuti Stadion; Attendance: 800; Referee: Szabolcs Szilasi

6 November 2010 13	Szombathely	2–0	MTK Budapest	Szombathely
16:00 CET	Á. Simon 24'; Kenesei 45'	Report		Stadium: Rohonci úti Stadion; Attendance: 3,000; Referee: István Vad

12 November 2010 14	MTK Budapest	2–1	Pápa	Budapest
17:00 CET	Könyves 75'; Eppel 79'	Report	Abwo 17'	Stadium: Hidegkuti Stadion; Attendance: 800; Referee: János Takács

20 November 2010 15	Paks	1–1	MTK Budapest	Paks
16:00 CET	Böde 81'	Report	Norbert Könyves 73'	Stadium: Fehérvári úti Stadion; Attendance: 1,300; Referee: Ádám Farkas

27 November 2010 16	Kecskemét	3–0	MTK Budapest	Kecskemét
16:00 CET	Tököli 14', 31'; Savić 17' (pen.)	Report		Stadium: Széktói Stadion; Attendance: 1,800; Referee: Ferenc Bede

26 February 2011 17	MTK Budapest	3–1	Budapest Honvéd	Budapest
15:00 CET	Sütő 43'; Urbán 76'; Eppel 90+1'	Report	Lovrić 25'	Stadium: Hidegkuti Stadion; Attendance: 1,500; Referee: Tamás Bognár

5 March 2011 18	Videoton	2–1	MTK Budapest	Székesfehérvár
17:30 CET	Alves 45' (pen.); Elek 78'	Report	Frank 28'	Stadium: Sóstói Stadion; Attendance: 3,075; Referee: Sándor Andó-Szabó

11 March 2011 19	MTK Budapest	0–0	Győr	Budapest
17:00 CET		Report		Stadium: Hidegkuti Stadion; Attendance: 1,000; Referee: (Chile) Alvaro Garcia

20 March 2011 20	Újpest	2–1	MTK Budapest	Budapest
17:30 CET	Ahjupera 24'; Balajti 58'	Report	Kanta 74'	Stadium: Szusza Ferenc Stadion; Attendance: 2,354; Referee: István Vad

2 April 2011 21	MTK Budapest	1–2	Siófok	Budapest
17:00 CEST	Sütő 57'	Report	Délczeg 39', 78'	Stadium: Hidegkuti Stadion; Attendance: 500; Referee: Mihály Fábián

8 April 2011 22	Vasas	1–1	MTK Budapest	Budapest
17:00 CEST	Ferenczi 65' (pen.)	Report	Tischler 37'	Stadium: Illovszky Rudolf Stadion; Attendance: 2,000; Referee: Roland Veizer

16 April 2011 23	Kaposvár	2–1	MTK Budapest	Kaposvár
18:00 CEST	Oláh 38'; Máté 83'	Report	Tischler 14'	Stadium: Rákóczi Stadion; Attendance: 3,000; Referee: Sándor Andó-Szabó

24 April 2011 24	MTK Budapest	1–3	Ferencváros	Budapest
17:30 CEST	Könyves 65'	Report	Schembri 66', 72'; Maróti 86'	Stadium: Hidegkuti Stadion; Attendance: 3,300; Referee: Viktor Kassai

27 April 2011 25	Debrecen	3–1	MTK Budapest	Debrecen
18:30 CEST	Šimac 27'; Ramos 28'; Coulibaly 75'	Report	Pátkai 15'	Stadium: Oláh Gábor utcai Stadion; Attendance: 4,000; Referee: Szabolcs Szilasi

30 April 2011 26	MTK Budapest	1–0	Szolnok	Budapest
18:00 CEST	Pál 35'	Report		Stadium: Hidegkuti Stadion; Attendance: 600; Referee: Zsolt Szabó

6 May 2011 27	Zalaegerszeg	1–0	MTK Budapest	Zalaegerszeg
19:00 CEST	Turkovs 57'	Report		Stadium: ZTE Arena; Attendance: 2,000; Referee: Mihály Fábián

11 May 2011 28	MTK Budapest	0–3	Szombathely	Budapest
20:00 CEST		Report	Kenesei 33'; Fodrek 81'; Halmosi 87'	Stadium: Hidegkuti Stadion; Attendance: 500; Referee: István Vad

14 May 2011 29	Pápa	0–2	MTK Budapest	Pápa
19:00 CEST		Report	Tischler 30'; Pátkai 77'	Stadium: Perutz Stadion; Attendance: 1,500; Referee: Viktor Kassai

21 May 2011 30	MTK Budapest	3–4	Paks	Budapest
17:30 CEST	Tischler 37', 52', 65'	Report	Csehi 2'; Magasföldi 63'; Böde 67', 78'	Stadium: Hidegkuti Stadion; Attendance: 1,000; Referee: Gábor Oláh

=== Hungarian Cup ===
22 September 2010 Round of 64	Puskás Akadémia	0–4	MTK Budapest	Székesfehérvár
15:30 CEST		Report	Á. Szabó 16'; Pátkai 23'; Szekeres 30'; Nikházi 81'	Stadium: Sóstói Stadion; Attendance: 300; Referee: Gábor Oláh

26 October 2010 Round of 32	Cegléd	0–5	MTK Budapest	Cegléd
14:30 CEST		Report	Kanta 24' (pen.); Sütő 54'; Pátkai 66'; Csiki 83'; Tischler 86'	Stadium: Malomtó-széli Stadion; Attendance: 200; Referee: Sándor Andó-Szabó

9 November 2010 Round of 16 (leg 1)	MTK Budapest	0–0	Győr	Budapest
17:00 CET		Report		Stadium: Hidegkuti Stadion; Attendance: 196; Referee: Roland Veizer

2 March 2011 Round of 16 (leg 2)	Győr	1–1 (1–1 agg.)	MTK Budapest	Győr
18:00 CET	Völgyi 34'	Report	Pátkai 39'	Stadium: ETO Park; Attendance: 1,200; Referee: Zoltán Iványi
Note: Next up is Mtk Budapest FC, with a goal scored abroad.

8 March 2011 Quarter-final (leg 1)	MTK Budapest	0–0	Zalaegerszeg	Budapest
18:00 CET		Report		Stadium: Hidegkuti Stadion; Attendance: 500; Referee: István Vad

15 March 2011 Quarter-final (leg 2)	Zalaegerszeg	2–1 (2–1 agg.)	MTK Budapest	Zalaegerszeg
17:00 CET	Delić 36'; Turkovs 48'	Report	Könyves 43'	Stadium: ZTE Arena; Attendance: 4,352; Referee: Viktor Kassai

=== Hungarian League Cup ===
==== Group stage ====
Pos	Team	Pld	W	D	L	GF	GA	GD	Pts	Qualification
1	Paks	4	3	0	1	12	5	+7	9	Advance to knockout phase
2	Vasas	4	2	0	2	7	8	−1	6	
3	MTK	4	1	0	3	6	12	−6	3	

24 July 2010 1	MTK Budapest	4–2	Paks	Budapest
17:00 CEST	Pál 6', 14'; Molnár 31', 39'	Report	Bartha 41'; Lisztes 63'	Stadium: Hidegkuti Nándor Stadion; Referee: Zoltán J. Kovács

28 July 2010 2	Vasas	4–1	MTK Budapest	Budapest
15:00 CEST	Pavičević 9'; Ferenczi 11', 59'; Benounes 38'	Report	Skriba 35'	Stadium: Illovszky Rudolf Stadion; Referee: Tamás Bognár

1 December 2010 5	Paks	4–0	MTK Budapest	Paks
16:00 CET	Nagy 40'; Magasföldi 68'; Haraszti 80'; Pap 89'	Report		Stadium: Fehérvári úti Stadion; Referee: Szabolcs Szilasi

8 December 2010 6	MTK Budapest	1–2	Vasas	Budapest
13:00 CET	Eppel 61'	Report	Ferenczi 3', 69'	Stadium: Hidegkuti Nándor Stadion; Referee: János Takács

=== Appearances and goals ===
Last updated on 21 May 2011.

No.	Pos	Nat	Player	Total		NB 1		Hungarian Cup		League Cup	
No.	Pos	Nat	Player	Apps	Goals	Apps	Goals	Apps	Goals	Apps	Goals
1	GK	(Hungary) HUN	Lajos Hegedűs	10	-11	7	-9	2	-0	1	-2
2	MF	(Hungary) HUN	András Gál	20	1	15	1	2	0	3	0
3	MF	(Hungary) HUN	Sándor Hajdú	14	0	10	0	1	0	3	0
4	DF	(Hungary) HUN	Dániel Vadnai	25	0	21	0	3	0	1	0
5	DF	(Hungary) HUN	László Sütő	31	3	25	2	6	1	0	0
6	MF	(Hungary) HUN	Máté Pátkai	32	5	27	2	4	3	1	0
7	DF	(Montenegro) MNE	Dejan Vukadinović	31	0	25	0	5	0	1	0
8	FW	(Hungary) HUN	Norbert Csiki	7	1	1	0	3	1	3	0
9	FW	(Hungary) HUN	András Pál	32	2	27	2	5	0	0	0
11	MF	(Hungary) HUN	Tibor Ladányi	31	1	24	1	6	0	1	0
12	DF	(Hungary) HUN	Dávid Kálnoki-Kis	7	0	5	0	0	0	2	0
13	DF	(Hungary) HUN	Adrián Szekeres	36	1	29	0	6	1	1	0
14	DF	(Hungary) HUN	Dávid Kelemen	7	0	3	0	0	0	4	0
15	FW	(Hungary) HUN	Norbert Könyves	31	6	25	5	5	1	1	0
16	MF	(Hungary) HUN	Zsolt Pölöskei	0	0	0	0	0	0	0	0
17	FW	(Hungary) HUN	Márton Eppel	26	4	21	3	4	0	1	1
19	MF	(Hungary) HUN	József Kanta	32	5	27	4	5	1	0	0
20	DF	(Serbia) SRB	Dragan Vukmir	22	0	16	0	6	0	0	0
21	FW	(Hungary) HUN	Marcell Molnár	5	2	1	0	0	0	4	2
22	MF	(Australia) AUS	Sasa Macura	7	0	0	0	4	0	3	0
23	MF	(Hungary) HUN	Ádám Szabó	17	1	14	0	3	1	0	0
24	DF	(Hungary) HUN	Bence Zámbó	2	0	1	0	0	0	1	0
25	MF	(Hungary) HUN	Márk Nikházi	16	1	11	0	3	1	2	0
26	GK	(Hungary) HUN	András Horváth	2	-6	0	-0	0	-0	2	-6
27	FW	(Hungary) HUN	Richárd Frank	7	1	5	1	2	0	0	0
28	GK	(Italy) ITA	Federico Groppioni	0	0	0	-0	0	-0	0	-0
29	GK	(Hungary) HUN	Zoltán Szatmári	29	-43	25	-40	4	-3	0	-0
30	FW	(Hungary) HUN	Patrik Tischler	35	13	29	12	5	1	1	0
31	FW	(Hungary) HUN	Gábor Urbán	6	1	4	1	2	0	0	0
33	FW	(Hungary) HUN	Ádám Hrepka	7	0	7	0	0	0	0	0
39	DF	(Jamaica) JAM	Rafe Wolfe	5	0	5	0	0	0	0	0
Youth players:
	DF	(Hungary) HUN	Tibor Nagy	1	0	0	0	0	0	1	0
	DF	(Hungary) HUN	Csaba Aradi	1	0	0	0	0	0	1	0
	DF	(Hungary) HUN	Attila Kornis	3	0	0	0	0	0	3	0
	MF	(Hungary) HUN	Dániel Kákonyi	3	0	0	0	0	0	3	0
	DF	(Hungary) HUN	Norbert Ódé	3	0	0	0	0	0	3	0
	FW	(Hungary) HUN	Szabolcs Pál	3	2	0	0	0	0	3	2
	MF	(Hungary) HUN	Attila Besztercei	0	0	0	0	0	0	0	0
	DF	(Hungary) HUN	Bence Szurkos	2	0	0	0	0	0	2	0
	FW	(Hungary) HUN	Ákos Szentgyörgyi	1	0	0	0	0	0	1	0
	DF	(Hungary) HUN	Gyula Forró	3	0	0	0	0	0	3	0
	DF	(Hungary) HUN	Szabolcs Csordás	0	0	0	0	0	0	0	0
	FW	(Hungary) HUN	László Szabó	2	0	0	0	0	0	2	0
	GK	(Hungary) HUN	György Scheilinger	1	-4	0	-0	0	-0	1	-4
	GK	(Hungary) HUN	Zoltán Berhidai	0	0	0	-0	0	-0	0	-0
Players no longer at the club:
16	MF	(Hungary) HUN	Máté Skriba	4	1	2	0	0	0	2	1
27	DF	(Hungary) HUN	Ádám Pintér	4	1	4	1	0	0	0	0

=== Top scorers ===
Includes all competitive matches. The list is sorted by shirt number when total goals are equal.

Last updated on 21 May 2011

Position	Nation	Number	Name	Soproni Liga	Hungarian Cup	League Cup	Total
1	(Hungary)	30	Patrik Tischler	12	1	0	13
2	(Hungary)	15	Norbert Könyves	5	1	0	6
3	(Hungary)	19	József Kanta	4	1	0	5
4	(Hungary)	6	Máté Pátkai	2	3	0	5
5	(Hungary)	17	Márton Eppel	3	0	1	4
6	(Hungary)	5	László Sütő	2	1	0	3
7	(Hungary)	9	András Pál	2	0	0	2
8	(Hungary)	11	Szabolcs Pál	0	0	2	2
9	(Hungary)	21	Marcell Molnár	0	0	2	2
10	(Hungary)	27	Ádám Pintér	1	0	0	1
11	(Hungary)	2	András Gál	1	0	0	1
12	(Hungary)	11	Tibor Ladányi	1	0	0	1
13	(Hungary)	31	Gábor Urbán	1	0	0	1
14	(Hungary)	27	Richárd Frank	1	0	0	1
15	(Hungary)	23	Ádám Szabó	0	1	0	1
16	(Hungary)	13	Adrián Szekeres	0	1	0	1
17	(Hungary)	25	Márk Nikházi	0	1	0	1
18	(Hungary)	8	Norbert Csiki	0	1	0	1
19	(Hungary)	6	Máté Skriba	0	0	1	1
/	/	/	Own Goals	0	0	0	0
			TOTALS	34	11	6	51

=== Disciplinary record ===
Includes all competitive matches. Players with 1 card or more included only.

Last updated on 21 May 2011

Position	Nation	Number	Name	Soproni Liga		Hungarian Cup		League Cup		Total (Hu Total)	
Position	Nation	Number	Name	Booked	Sent off (straight red)	Booked	Sent off (straight red)	Booked	Sent off (straight red)	Booked	Sent off (straight red)
GK	(Hungary)	1	Lajos Hegedűs	0	1	0	0	0	0	0 (0)	1 (1)
MF	(Hungary)	2	András Gál	2	0	1	1	1	0	4 (2)	1 (0)
DF	(Hungary)	3	Sándor Hajdú	2	0	0	0	0	0	2 (2)	0 (0)
DF	(Hungary)	4	Dániel Vadnai	3	0	0	0	0	0	3 (3)	0 (0)
DF	(Hungary)	5	László Sütő	4	3	0	0	0	0	4 (4)	3 (3)
MF	(Hungary)	6	Máté Pátkai	6	0	0	0	0	0	6 (6)	0 (0)
MF	(Montenegro)	7	Dejan Vukadinović	5	0	2	0	0	0	7 (5)	0 (0)
FW	(Hungary)	9	András Pál	3	0	1	0	0	0	4 (3)	0 (0)
MF	(Hungary)	11	Tibor Ladányi	6	0	1	0	0	0	7 (6)	0 (0)
DF	(Hungary)	13	Adrián Szekeres	1	0	1	0	0	0	2 (1)	0 (0)
DF	(Hungary)	14	Dávid Kelemen	1	0	0	0	0	0	1 (1)	0 (0)
FW	(Serbia)	15	Norbert Könyves	3	1	0	0	0	0	3 (3)	1 (1)
MF	(Hungary)	16	Máté Skriba	0	0	0	0	1	0	1 (0)	0 (0)
FW	(Hungary)	18	László Szabó	0	0	0	0	1	0	1 (0)	0 (0)
MF	(Hungary)	19	József Kanta	4	0	1	0	0	0	5 (4)	0 (0)
DF	(Serbia)	20	Dragan Vukmir	5	0	1	0	0	0	6 (5)	0 (0)
FW	(Hungary)	21	Marcell Molnár	0	0	0	0	1	0	1 (0)	0 (0)
MF	(Australia)	22	Sasa Macura	0	0	1	0	1	0	2 (0)	0 (0)
MF	(Hungary)	23	Ádám Szabó	4	0	0	0	0	0	4 (4)	0 (0)
MF	(Hungary)	25	Márk Nikházi	1	0	0	0	0	0	1 (1)	0 (0)
FW	(Hungary)	27	Richárd Frank	1	0	0	0	0	0	1 (1)	0 (0)
GK	(Hungary)	29	Zoltán Szatmári	1	0	0	0	0	0	1 (1)	0 (0)
FW	(Hungary)	30	Patrik Tischler	4	0	0	0	0	0	4 (4)	0 (0)
FW	(Hungary)	31	Gábor Urbán	2	0	0	0	0	0	2 (2)	0 (0)
FW	(Hungary)	33	Ádám Hrepka	0	1	0	0	0	0	0 (0)	1 (1)
DF	(Hungary)		Attila Kornis	0	0	0	0	0	1	0 (0)	1 (1)
FW	(Hungary)		Szabolcs Pál	0	0	0	0	0	1	0 (0)	1 (1)
			TOTALS	58	6	9	1	5	2	72 (58)	9 (6)

=== Clean sheets ===
Last updated on 21 May 2011

Position	Nation	Number	Name	OTP Bank Liga	Hungarian Cup	League Cup	Total
1	(Hungary)	29	Zoltán Szatmári	5	2	0	7
2	(Hungary)	1	Lajos Hegedűs	3	2	0	5
3	(Hungary)	26	András Horváth	0	0	0	0
4	(Italy)	28	Federico Groppioni	0	0	0	0
5	(Hungary)	#	György Scheilinger	0	0	0	0
6	(Hungary)	#	Zoltán Berhidai	0	0	0	0
			TOTALS	8	4	0	12
