= 2013–14 MTK Budapest FC season =

MTK Budapest FC
2013–14 season
- Chairman: (Hungary) Tamás Deutsch
- Manager: (Hungary) József Garami
- NB 1: 8th
- Hungarian Cup: Semi-final
- Hungarian League Cup: Group stage
- Top goalscorer: League: (Hungary) József Kanta (10); All: (Hungary) József Kanta (15)
- Highest home attendance: 5,000 vs Ferencváros (8 March 2014)
- Lowest home attendance: 100 vs Kisvárda (8 October 2013)
Home colours	Away colours

The 2013–14 season will be MTK Budapest FC's 104th competitive season, 2nd consecutive season in the OTP Bank Liga and 125th year in existence as a football club.

== First team squad ==
Note: Flags indicate national team as defined under FIFA eligibility rules; some limited exceptions apply. Players may hold more than one non-FIFA nationality.

No.	Pos.	Nation	Player
1	GK	HUN	Lajos Hegedűs
2	DF	HUN	Tibor Nagy
4	DF	HUN	Ákos Baki
5	DF	HUN	Dávid Kelemen
6	MF	HUN	Ádám Hajdú
7	FW	HUN	Zsolt Horváth
8	FW	HUN	Norbert Csiki
9	FW	HUN	András Pál
11	MF	HUN	Tibor Ladányi
12	DF	HUN	Dávid Kálnoki-Kis
14	DF	HUN	András Fejes (loan to Videoton II)
15	MF	HUN	Bence Sipos
16	MF	HUN	Zsolt Pölöskei
17	MF	HUN	Patrik Vass
18	FW	HUN	Barnabás Bese

No.	Pos.	Nation	Player
19	MF	HUN	József Kanta
20	DF	HUN	István Rodenbücher
21	DF	SRB	Dragan Vukmir
22	DF	HUN	Dávid Asztalos
24	DF	HUN	Patrik Poór
25	MF	ESP	Ayub
27	MF	HUN	Bence Batik (loan from Ferencváros)
28	GK	ITA	Federico Groppioni
30	FW	HUN	Sándor Torghelle
31	MF	HUN	András Pintér
32	FW	HUN	Richárd Frank
33	MF	HUN	Szilveszter Hangya
38	MF	HUN	Ádám Vass
45	FW	HUN	Márton Eppel (loan from Paks)

== Transfers ==
=== Summer ===
In: Note: Flags indicate national team as defined under FIFA eligibility rules; some limited exceptions apply. Players may hold more than one non-FIFA nationality.

No.	Pos.	Nation	Player
7	MF	HUN	Zsolt Horváth (from Pécs)
14	DF	HUN	András Fejes (loan from Videoton II)
23	MF	HUN	Szabolcs Varga (from MTK Academy)
25	MF	ESP	Ayub (from (Spain) Mataró)
27	MF	HUN	Bence Batik (loan from Ferencváros)
29	GK	HUN	Attila Abu (from MTK II)
32	FW	HUN	Richárd Frank (loan return from Tatabánya)
39	FW	HUN	Péter Horváth (from MTK II)
45	FW	HUN	Márton Eppel (loan from Paks)
—	DF	HUN	Bence Deutsch (from MTK Academy)
—	MF	SRB	Đorđe Đurić (loan return from Tatabánya)

Out: Note: Flags indicate national team as defined under FIFA eligibility rules; some limited exceptions apply. Players may hold more than one non-FIFA nationality.

No.	Pos.	Nation	Player
4	DF	HUN	Sándor Hidvégi (to Ferencváros)
7	MF	HUN	László Zsidai (to Debrecen)
9	FW	HUN	András Pál
20	FW	HUN	Ferenc Rácz (loan to Pécs)
23	DF	HUN	Dániel Vadnai (to Debrecen)
25	MF	HUN	Márk Nikházi (to Diósgyőr)
30	FW	HUN	Patrik Tischler (to Puskás)
39	DF	JAM	Rafe Wolfe (to Győr)
91	FW	HUN	Ádám Balajti (loan return to Debrecen)
—	DF	HUN	Bence Deutsch (loan to Pécs)
—	MF	SRB	Đorđe Đurić

=== Winter ===
In: Note: Flags indicate national team as defined under FIFA eligibility rules; some limited exceptions apply. Players may hold more than one non-FIFA nationality.

No.	Pos.	Nation	Player
22	DF	HUN	István Rodenbücher (from Pápa)
26	GK	HUN	György Scheilinger (loan return from Vecsés)
30	FW	HUN	Sándor Torghelle (from Videoton)
38	MF	HUN	Ádám Vass (from (Belgium) Oostende)
—	DF	HUN	Bence Deutsch (loan return from Pécs)

Out: Note: Flags indicate national team as defined under FIFA eligibility rules; some limited exceptions apply. Players may hold more than one non-FIFA nationality.

No.	Pos.	Nation	Player
20	FW	HUN	Balázs Batizi-Pócsi (loan to Tatabánya)
23	MF	HUN	Szabolcs Varga (to (Netherlands) Heerenveen)
39	FW	HUN	Péter Horváth (loan to Siófok)
—	DF	HUN	Bence Deutsch (loan to Szigetszentmiklós)

- List of Hungarian football transfers summer 2013
- List of Hungarian football transfers winter 2013–14

== Statistics ==
=== Appearances and goals ===
Last updated on 1 June 2014.

No.	Pos	Nat	Player	Total		OTP Bank Liga		Hungarian Cup		League Cup	
No.	Pos	Nat	Player	Apps	Goals	Apps	Goals	Apps	Goals	Apps	Goals
1	GK	(Hungary) HUN	Lajos Hegedűs	28	-34	24	-28	1	-3	3	-3
2	DF	(Hungary) HUN	Tibor Nagy	22	0	17	0	3	0	2	0
4	DF	(Hungary) HUN	Ákos Baki	11	0	4	0	2	0	5	0
5	DF	(Hungary) HUN	Dávid Kelemen	14	0	8	0	5	0	1	0
6	MF	(Hungary) HUN	Ádám Hajdú	13	0	6	0	1	0	6	0
7	FW	(Hungary) HUN	Zsolt Horváth	22	5	15	3	6	1	1	1
8	FW	(Hungary) HUN	Norbert Csiki	12	0	8	0	3	0	1	0
9	FW	(Hungary) HUN	András Pál	6	0	6	0	0	0	0	0
11	MF	(Hungary) HUN	Tibor Ladányi	24	1	18	1	5	0	1	0
12	DF	(Hungary) HUN	Dávid Kálnoki-Kis	37	0	29	0	6	0	2	0
14	DF	(Hungary) HUN	András Fejes	29	1	22	1	5	0	2	0
15	MF	(Hungary) HUN	Bence Sipos	6	0	1	0	0	0	5	0
16	MF	(Hungary) HUN	Zsolt Pölöskei	36	6	28	6	7	0	1	0
17	MF	(Hungary) HUN	Patrik Vass	33	3	24	2	7	1	2	0
18	FW	(Hungary) HUN	Barnabás Bese	27	4	21	4	4	0	2	0
19	MF	(Hungary) HUN	József Kanta	35	15	27	10	7	5	1	0
20	DF	(Hungary) HUN	István Rodenbücher	8	0	6	0	2	0	0	0
21	DF	(Serbia) SRB	Dragan Vukmir	31	1	28	1	2	0	1	0
22	DF	(Hungary) HUN	Dávid Asztalos	3	0	1	0	0	0	2	0
24	DF	(Hungary) HUN	Patrik Poór	32	0	25	0	6	0	1	0
25	MF	(Spain) ESP	Ayub	9	0	4	0	0	0	5	0
27	MF	(Hungary) HUN	Bence Batik	19	1	15	1	4	0	0	0
28	GK	(Italy) ITA	Federico Groppioni	13	-14	6	-8	6	-3	1	-3
30	FW	(Hungary) HUN	Sándor Torghelle	12	8	10	7	2	1	0	0
31	MF	(Hungary) HUN	András Pintér	7	0	2	0	0	0	5	0
32	FW	(Hungary) HUN	Richárd Frank	9	1	4	0	2	0	3	1
33	MF	(Hungary) HUN	Szilveszter Hangya	5	1	1	0	0	0	4	1
38	MF	(Hungary) HUN	Ádám Vass	15	1	11	1	4	0	0	0
45	FW	(Hungary) HUN	Márton Eppel	31	5	22	1	6	2	3	2
Youth players:
3	DF	(Hungary) HUN	Ferenc Tóth	5	0	0	0	0	0	5	0
20	MF	(Hungary) HUN	Dániel Gera	4	1	0	0	0	0	4	1
22	MF	(Hungary) HUN	Milán Sági	2	0	0	0	0	0	2	0
23	MF	(Hungary) HUN	Ádám Szabó	1	0	0	0	0	0	1	0
29	GK	(Hungary) HUN	Attila Abu	3	-3	0	0	0	0	3	-3
Out to loan:
20	FW	(Hungary) HUN	Balázs Batizi-Pócsi	1	0	0	0	0	0	1	0
39	FW	(Hungary) HUN	Péter Horváth	15	2	10	0	0	0	5	2
Players no longer at the club:
23	MF	(Hungary) HUN	Szabolcs Varga	10	3	8	2	1	1	1	0

=== Top scorers ===
Includes all competitive matches. The list is sorted by shirt number when total goals are equal.

Last updated on 1 June 2014

Position	Nation	Number	Name	OTP Bank Liga	Hungarian Cup	League Cup	Total
1	(Hungary)	19	József Kanta	10	5	0	15
2	(Hungary)	30	Sándor Torghelle	7	1	0	8
3	(Hungary)	16	Zsolt Pölöskei	6	0	0	6
4	(Hungary)	7	Zsolt Horváth	3	1	1	5
5	(Hungary)	45	Márton Eppel	1	2	2	5
6	(Hungary)	18	Barnabás Bese	4	0	0	4
7	(Hungary)	23	Szabolcs Varga	2	1	0	3
8	(Hungary)	17	Patrik Vass	2	1	0	3
9	(Hungary)	39	Péter Horváth	0	0	2	2
10	(Hungary)	11	Tibor Ladányi	1	0	0	1
11	(Hungary)	14	András Fejes	1	0	0	1
12	(Hungary)	27	Bence Batik	1	0	0	1
13	(Serbia)	21	Dragan Vukmir	1	0	0	1
14	(Hungary)	38	Ádám Vass	1	0	0	1
15	(Hungary)	20	Dániel Gera	0	0	1	1
16	(Hungary)	33	Szilveszter Hangya	0	0	1	1
17	(Hungary)	32	Richárd Frank	0	0	1	1
/	/	/	Own Goals	2	0	0	2
			TOTALS	41	11	8	60

=== Disciplinary record ===
Includes all competitive matches. Players with 1 card or more included only.

Last updated on 1 June 2014

Position	Nation	Number	Name	OTP Bank Liga		Hungarian Cup		League Cup		Total (Hu Total)	
Position	Nation	Number	Name	Booked	Sent off (straight red)	Booked	Sent off (straight red)	Booked	Sent off (straight red)	Booked	Sent off (straight red)
DF	(Hungary)	2	Tibor Nagy	6	0	2	0	0	0	8 (6)	0 (0)
DF	(Hungary)	4	Ákos Baki	0	0	1	0	1	0	2 (0)	0 (0)
DF	(Hungary)	5	Dávid Kelemen	0	0	1	0	0	0	1 (0)	0 (0)
FW	(Hungary)	7	Zsolt Horváth	2	0	0	0	0	0	2 (2)	0 (0)
FW	(Hungary)	8	Norbert Csiki	1	0	0	0	0	0	1 (1)	0 (0)
MF	(Hungary)	11	Tibor Ladányi	4	0	0	0	0	0	4 (4)	0 (0)
DF	(Hungary)	12	Dávid Kálnoki-Kis	7	0	2	0	0	0	9 (7)	0 (0)
DF	(Hungary)	14	András Fejes	5	0	1	0	0	0	6 (5)	0 (0)
MF	(Hungary)	15	Bence Sipos	0	0	0	0	1	0	1 (0)	0 (0)
FW	(Hungary)	16	Zsolt Pölöskei	3	0	0	0	0	0	3 (3)	0 (0)
FW	(Hungary)	18	Barnabás Bese	0	0	1	0	0	0	1 (0)	0 (0)
MF	(Hungary)	19	József Kanta	8	0	1	0	1	0	10 (8)	0 (0)
DF	(Hungary)	20	István Rodenbücher	0	1	0	0	0	0	0 (0)	1 (1)
MF	(Hungary)	20	Dániel Gera	0	0	0	0	1	0	1 (0)	0 (0)
DF	(Serbia)	21	Dragan Vukmir	6	0	0	0	0	0	6 (6)	0 (0)
DF	(Hungary)	22	Dávid Asztalos	1	0	0	0	0	0	1 (1)	0 (0)
DF	(Hungary)	24	Patrik Poór	9	0	1	0	0	0	10 (9)	0 (0)
MF	(Spain)	25	Ayub	2	0	0	0	1	0	3 (2)	0 (0)
MF	(Hungary)	27	Bence Batik	0	0	2	0	0	0	2 (0)	0 (0)
FW	(Hungary)	30	Sándor Torghelle	3	0	0	1	0	0	3 (3)	1 (0)
MF	(Hungary)	31	András Pintér	0	0	0	0	1	0	1 (0)	0 (0)
MF	(Hungary)	33	Szilveszter Hangya	0	0	0	0	1	0	1 (0)	0 (0)
MF	(Hungary)	38	Ádám Vass	3	0	1	1	0	0	4 (3)	1 (0)
FW	(Hungary)	39	Péter Horváth	1	0	0	0	0	0	1 (1)	0 (0)
FW	(Hungary)	45	Márton Eppel	2	0	0	0	0	0	2 (2)	0 (0)
			TOTALS	62	1	13	2	8	0	83 (62)	3 (1)

=== Overall ===
Games played	43 (30 OTP Bank Liga, 7 Hungarian Cup and 6 Hungarian League Cup)
Games won	17 (11 OTP Bank Liga, 4 Hungarian Cup and 2 Hungarian League Cup)
Games drawn	10 (7 OTP Bank Liga, 2 Hungarian Cup and 1 Hungarian League Cup)
Games lost	16 (12 OTP Bank Liga, 1 Hungarian Cup and 3 Hungarian League Cup)
Goals scored	61
Goals conceded	51
Goal difference	+10
Yellow cards	83
Red cards	3
Worst discipline	(Hungary) József Kanta (10 (yellow card) , 0 (red card) )
Worst discipline	(Hungary) Patrik Poór (10 (yellow card) , 0 (red card) )
Best result	4–0 (A) v Újpest – OTP Bank Liga – 03-05-2014
Worst result	0–3 (A) v Győr – OTP Bank Liga – 29-03-2014
Worst result	0–3 (A) v Kecskemét – OTP Bank Liga – 19-04-2014
Worst result	0–3 (A) v Újpest – Magyar Kupa – 06-05-2014
Most appearances	(Hungary) Dávid Kálnoki-Kis (37 appearances)
Top scorer	(Hungary) József Kanta (15 goals)
Points	61/129 (47.29%)

Last updated: 1 June 2014

== Nemzeti Bajnokság I ==
=== Matches ===
27 July 2013 1	MTK	3–0	Mezőkövesd	Budapest, Pest County
19:00 CEST	Pölöskei 51'; Ladányi 79'; Varga 88'	(Report)		Stadium: Hidegkuti Nándor Stadium; Attendance: 1,500; Referee: (Hungary) Dániel Becséri

3 August 2013 2	Diósgyőr	2–2	MTK	Miskolc, Borsod-Abaúj-Zemplén County
16:30 CEST	Alves 40'; Tisza 54'	(Report)	Pölöskei 14'; Bese 67'	Stadium: DVTK Stadion; Attendance: 4,000; Referee: (Hungary) Tamás Bognár

9 August 2013 3	MTK	0–1	Szombathely	Budapest, Pest County
19:00 CEST		(Report)	Ugrai 42'	Stadium: Hidegkuti Nándor Stadium; Attendance: 800; Referee: (Hungary) Viktor Kassai

17 August 2013 4	Ferencváros	2–0	MTK	Budapest, Pest County
21:00 CEST	Józsi 24' (pen.); Holman 56'	(Report)		Stadium: Ferenc Puskás Stadium; Attendance: 8,490; Referee: (Hungary) Ádám Farkas

24 August 2013 5	MTK	0–1	Pécs	Budapest, Pest County
19:00 CEST		(Report)	Pölöskey 46'	Stadium: Hidegkuti Nándor Stadium; Attendance: 1,500; Referee: (Hungary) Ádám Németh

1 September 2013 6	Videoton	2–0	MTK	Székesfehérvár, Fejér County
20:30 CEST	Kálnoki-Kis 39' (o.g.); Nikolić 42'	(Report)		Stadium: Sóstói Stadion; Attendance: 2,850; Referee: (Hungary) Tamás Bognár

15 September 2013 7	MTK	1–2	Győr	Budapest, Pest County
18:30 CEST	Kanta 18'	(Report)	Rudolf 65'; Lázok 89'	Stadium: Hidegkuti Nándor Stadium; Attendance: 500; Referee: (Hungary) Sándor Andó-Szabó

21 September 2013 8	MTK	2–0	Paks	Budapest, Pest County
18:00 CEST	Kanta 47'; Pölöskei 88'	(Report)		Stadium: Hidegkuti Nándor Stadium; Attendance: 900; Referee: (Hungary) Tamás Bognár

29 September 2013 9	Debrecen	1–0	MTK	Debrecen, Hajdú-Bihar County
16:30 CEST	Szakály 65'	(Report)		Stadium: Stadion Oláh Gábor Út; Attendance: 4,000; Referee: (Hungary) József Erdős

5 October 2013 10	MTK	2–2	Kecskemét	Budapest, Pest County
18:00 CEST	Fejes 20'; Batik 84'	(Report)	Savić 63'; Nagy 73'	Stadium: Hidegkuti Nándor Stadium; Attendance: 1,000; Referee: (Hungary) Zsolt Szabó

19 October 2013 11	Pápa	0–2	MTK	Pápa, Veszprém County
16:00 CEST		(Report)	Bese 54'; Pölöskei 57'	Stadium: Stadion Várkerti; Attendance: 1,200; Referee: (Hungary) Viktor Kassai

25 October 2013 12	MTK	0–1	Újpest	Budapest, Pest County
19:00 CEST		(Report)	Juanan 23'	Stadium: Hidegkuti Nándor Stadium; Attendance: 1,500; Referee: (Hungary) Sándor Andó-Szabó

2 November 2013 13	Puskás	1–1	MTK	Székesfehérvár, Fejér County
18:00 CET	Tischler 50'	(Report)	Varga 90+3'	Stadium: Sóstói Stadion; Attendance: 300; Referee: (Hungary) József Erdős

9 November 2013 14	MTK	1–1	Honvéd	Budapest, Pest County
20:00 CET	Kanta 83'	(Report)	Hidi 84'	Stadium: Hidegkuti Nándor Stadium; Attendance: 1,500; Referee: (Hungary) Ádám Farkas

23 November 2013 15	Kaposvár	2–2	MTK	Kaposvár, Somogy County
16:00 CET	Babić 58'; Mărkuş 83'	(Report)	Kanta 5'; Eppel 30'	Stadium: Stadion Kaposvár Rákóczi; Attendance: 1,800; Referee: (Hungary) Sándor Andó-Szabó

30 November 2013 16	Mezőkövesd	1–0	MTK	Mezőkövesd, Borsod-Abaúj-Zemplén County
28:00 CET	Melczer 58'	(Report)		Stadium: Mezőkövesdi Városi Stadion; Attendance: 2,000; Referee: (Hungary) József Erdős

7 December 2013 17	MTK	2–2	Diósgyőr	Budapest, Pest County
18:00 CET	Kanta 50'; Horváth 53'	(Report)	Bacsa 55'; Nikházi 81'	Stadium: Hidegkuti Nándor Stadium; Attendance: 600; Referee: (Hungary) Tamás Bognár

1 March 2014 18	Haladás	0–0	MTK	Szombathely, Vas County
16:00 CET		(Report)		Stadium: Rohonci Street Stadium; Attendance: 2,480; Referee: (Hungary) Ádám Farkas

8 March 2014 19	MTK	3–2	Ferencváros	Budapest, Pest County
16:00 CET	Pölöskei 1'; Kanta 60'; Torghelle 65'	(Report)	Somália 18', 76'	Stadium: Hidegkuti Nándor Stadium; Attendance: 5,000; Referee: (Hungary) Sándor Andó-Szabó

16 March 2014 20	Pécs	1–0	MTK	Pécs, Baranya County
16:30 CET	Koller 44' (pen.)	(Report)		Stadium: Stadion PMFC; Attendance: 2,500; Referee: (Hungary) Zsolt Szabó

22 March 2014 21	MTK	1–2	Videoton	Budapest, Pest County
16:00 CET	Torghelle 83' (pen.)	(Report)	Alvarez 71'; Petrolina 74'	Stadium: Hidegkuti Nándor Stadium; Attendance: 1,000; Referee: (Hungary) Viktor Kassai

29 March 2014 22	Győr	3–0	MTK	Győr, Győr-Moson-Sopron County
20:00 CET	Rudolf 12'; Lipták 67'; Andrić 71'	(Report)		Stadium: ETO Park; Attendance: 2,800; Referee: (Hungary) Ádám Farkas

5 April 2014 23	Paks	1–3	MTK	Paks, Tolna County
16:00 CEST	Heffler 67'	(Report)	Vass 16'; Torghelle 37', 60'	Stadium: Stadion PSE; Attendance: 700; Referee: (Hungary) Zoltán Iványi

12 April 2014 24	MTK	5–2	Debrecen	Budapest, Pest County
20:00 CEST	Horváth 11'; Vass 14'; Pölöskei 48'; Kanta 62' (pen.); Vukmir 82'	(Report)	Vadnai 22'; Kulcsár 40'	Stadium: Hidegkuti Nándor Stadium; Attendance: 1,500; Referee: (Hungary) István Vad

19 April 2014 25	Kecskemét	3–0	MTK	Kecskemét, Bács-Kiskun County
16:00 CEST	Simon 12'; Savić 29'; Pavićević 90+2'	(Report)		Stadium: Széktói Stadion; Attendance: 2,120; Referee: (Hungary) Sándor Andó-Szabó

26 April 2014 26	MTK	2–0	Pápa	Budapest, Pest County
16:00 CEST	Torghelle 10', 26'	(Report)		Stadium: Hidegkuti Nándor Stadium; Attendance: 600; Referee: (Hungary) József Erdős

3 May 2014 27	Újpest	0–4	MTK	Budapest, Pest County
16:00 CEST		(Report)	Nagy 6' (o.g.); Vass 56'; Kanta 77' (pen.); Torghelle 87'	Stadium: Szusza Ferenc Stadium; Attendance: 1,601; Referee: (Hungary) Sándor Andó-Szabó

9 May 2014 28	MTK	2–1	Puskás	Budapest, Pest County
19:00 CEST	Szekeres 36' (o.g.); Horváth 46'	(Report)	Lencse 76'	Stadium: Hidegkuti Nándor Stadium; Attendance: 500; Referee: (Hungary) Péter Solymosi

17 May 2014 29	Honvéd	0–2	MTK	Budapest, Pest County
14:00 CEST		(Report)	Kanta 56', 62'	Stadium: Bozsik Stadion; Attendance: 500; Referee: (Hungary) József Erdős

31 May 2014 30	MTK	2–0	Kaposvár	Budapest, Pest County
18:00 CEST	Bese 34', 43'	(Report)		Stadium: Hidegkuti Nándor Stadium; Attendance: 2,000; Referee: (Hungary) Csaba Pintér

=== Classification ===
Pos	Team	Pld	W	D	L	GF	GA	GD	Pts
6	Haladás	30	12	10	8	37	31	+6	46
7	Pécs	30	12	9	9	41	38	+3	45
8	MTK	30	11	7	12	42	36	+6	40
9	Honvéd	30	10	6	14	37	39	−2	36
10	Kecskemét	30	9	9	12	36	51	−15	36

Source: mlsz.hu (in Hungarian)
Rules for classification: 1st points; 2nd overall wins; 3rd goal difference; 4th head-to-head points; 5th head-to-head goal difference; 6th head-to-head away goals scored; 7th fair-play points; 8th drawing of lots

=== Results summary ===
Overall								Home						Away					
Pld	W	D	L	GF	GA	GD	Pts	W	D	L	GF	GA	GD	W	D	L	GF	GA	GD
30	11	7	12	42	36	+6	40	7	3	5	26	17	+9	4	4	7	16	19	−3

Last updated: 1 June 2014.
Source: NB1

=== Results by round ===
Round	1	2	3	4	5	6	7	8	9	10	11	12	13	14	15	16	17	18	19	20	21	22	23	24	25	26	27	28	29	30
Ground	H	A	H	A	H	A	H	H	A	H	A	H	A	H	A	A	H	A	H	A	H	A	A	H	A	H	A	H	A	H
Result	W	D	L	L	L	L	L	W	L	D	W	L	D	D	D	L	D	D	W	L	L	L	W	W	L	W	W	W	W	W
Position	2	5	7	10	11	14	14	14	14	15	11	13	13	13	14	15	15	15	14	14	14	15	14	13	13	12	10	9	8	8

Updated to match(es) played on 1 June 2014. Source: Matches
A = Away; H = Home; W = Win; D = Draw; L = Loss

== Hungarian Cup ==
29 October 2013 Round of 32	Szeged	0–2	MTK	Gyula, Békés County
12:30 CET		(Report)	Eppel 15'; Varga 74'	Stadium: Academy Grosics Stadium; Attendance: Closed; Referee: (Hungary) Roland Veizer

26 November 2013 Round of 16 (1st leg)	Kecskemét	0–3	MTK	Kecskemét, Bács-Kiskun County
17:00 CET		(Report)	Vass 48'; Horváth 63'; Kanta 90+2' (pen.)	Stadium: Széktói Stadion; Attendance: 200; Referee: (Hungary) Viktor Kassai

3 December 2013 Round of 16 (2nd leg)	MTK	1–0 (4–0 agg.)	Kecskemét	Budapest, Pest County
17:30 CET	Kanta 63'	Report		Stadium: Hidegkuti Nándor Stadium; Attendance: 200; Referee: (Hungary) Ádám Németh

12 March 2014 Quarter-final (1st leg)	MTK	2–0	Győr	Budapest, Pest County
17:30 CET	Torghelle 37'; Kanta 67'	(Report)		Stadium: Hidegkuti Nándor Stadium; Attendance: 500; Referee: (Hungary) József Erdős

26 March 2014 Quarter-final (2nd leg)	Győr	3–3 (3–5 agg.)	MTK	Győr, Győr-Moson-Sopron County
18:00 CET	Pátkai 21'; Varga 23'; Andrić 85'	Report	Kanta 45', 87'; Eppel 47'	Stadium: ETO Park; Attendance: 1,200; Referee: (Hungary) Sándor Andó-Szabó

16 April 2014 Semi-final (1st leg)	MTK	0–0	Újpest	Budapest, Pest County
18:00 CEST		(Report)		Stadium: Hidegkuti Nándor Stadium; Attendance: 1,500; Referee: (Hungary) Péter Solymosi

6 May 2014 Semi-final (2nd leg)	Újpest	3–0 (3–0 agg.)	MTK	Budapest, Pest County
18:00 CEST	Juanan 57'; Balogh 79'; Kabát 84'	Report		Stadium: Szusza Ferenc Stadium; Attendance: 1,797; Referee: (Hungary) Ádám Farkas

== League Cup ==
=== Group stage ===
4 September 2013 1	MTK	3–1	Vasas	Budapest, Pest County
16:30 CEST	Eppel 37', 45'; Horváth 50'	(Report)	Boka 79'	Stadium: Hidegkuti Nándor Stadium; Attendance: 100; Referee: (Hungary) Ádám Radványi

11 September 2013 2	Diósgyőr	3–1	MTK	Miskolc, Borsod-Abaúj-Zemplén County
19:30 CEST	Bacsa 20', 32'; Debreceni 30'	(Report)	Gera 75' (pen.)	Stadium: DVTK Stadion; Attendance: 1,000; Referee: (Hungary) Gábor Oláh

8 October 2013 3	MTK	0–0	Kisvárda	Budapest, Pest County
15:00 CEST		(Report)		Stadium: Hidegkuti Nándor Stadium; Attendance: 100; Referee: (Hungary) Róbert Nagy

15 October 2013 4	Kisvárda	3–1	MTK	Kisvárda, Szabolcs-Szatmár-Bereg County
14:30 CEST	Varga 30'; Barzó 58'; Oláh 70'	(Report)	Hangya 35'	Stadium: Stadion Várkerti; Attendance: 200; Referee: (Hungary) László Varga

13 November 2013 5	MTK	2–0	Diósgyőr	Budapest, Pest County
13:00 CET	Zs. Horváth 45'; P. Horváth 59'	(Report)		Stadium: Hidegkuti Nándor Stadium; Attendance: 100; Referee: (Hungary) Szabolcs Szilasi

20 November 2013 6	Vasas	2–1	MTK	Budapest, Pest County
14:00 CET	Görgényi 8'; Boka 78'	(Report)	Frank 19'	Stadium: Stadion Rudolf Illovszky; Attendance: 150; Referee: (Hungary) Balázs Böcskei

==== Classification ====
Pos	Team	Pld	W	D	L	GF	GA	GD	Pts	Qualification
1	Diósgyőr	6	3	1	2	15	8	+7	10	Advance to knockout phase
2	Vasas	6	3	0	3	8	10	−2	9	Advance to knockout phase
3	Kisvárda	6	2	2	2	7	11	−4	8	
4	MTK	6	2	1	3	8	9	−1	7	

Rules for classification: 1) points; 2) goal difference; 3) number of goals scored.

== Pre-season ==
2 July 2013 1	MTK Budapest FC (Hungary)	1–0	(Slovakia) MŠK Rimavská Sobota	Agárd, Fejér County
CEST	Tischler	(Report)		Stadium: Városi Stadion; Attendance: 50; Referee: (Hungary) Dániel Becséri

6 July 2013 2	MTK Budapest FC (Hungary)	3–0	(Slovakia) FC ŠTK 1914 Šamorín	Agárd, Fejér County
CEST	Horváth; Frank	(Report)		Stadium: Városi Stadion

9 July 2013 3	MTK Budapest FC (Hungary)	3–1	(Hungary) Gyirmót SE	Budapest, Pest County
CEST	Kanta; Vass; Horváth	(Report)	Magasföldi	Stadium: Hidegkuti Nándor Stadium; Attendance: 200; Referee: (Hungary) Tamás Berényi

13 July 2013 4	MTK Budapest FC (Hungary)	3–4	(Slovakia) ŽP Šport Podbrezová	Budapest, Pest County
CEST	Kanta; Vass	(Report)		Stadium: Hidegkuti Nándor Stadium

16 July 2013 5	MTK Budapest FC (Hungary)	3–1	(Hungary) Vasas SC	Budapest, Pest County
17:00 CEST	Pölöskei 4'; Horváth 12'; Tischler 16'	(Report)	Zamostny 86'	Stadium: Hidegkuti Nándor Stadium; Attendance: 500; Referee: (Hungary) M. Bereczki

20 July 2013 6	MTK Budapest FC (Hungary)	3–1	(Hungary) BFC Siófok	Budapest, Pest County
CEST	Pölöskei 4'; Kanta (pen.)	(Report)	Vólent	Stadium: Hidegkuti Nándor Stadium
