= 2012–13 MTK Budapest FC season =

MTK Budapest FC
2012–13 season
- Chairman: (Hungary) Tamás Deutsch
- Manager: (Hungary) József Garami
- NB 1: 3.
- UEFA Europa League: First qualifying round
- Hungarian Cup: 1. Round
- Hungarian League Cup: Group Stage
- Top goalscorer: League: József Kanta (9); All: József Kanta (10)
- Highest home attendance: 4,000 v Ferencváros (3 November 2012)
- Lowest home attendance: 50 v Szolnok (16 October 2012)
Home colours	Away colours

The 2012–13 season will be MTK Budapest FC's 103rd competitive season, 1st consecutive season in the OTP Bank Liga and 124th year in existence as a football club.

== First team squad ==
Note: Flags indicate national team as defined under FIFA eligibility rules; some limited exceptions apply. Players may hold more than one non-FIFA nationality.

No.	Pos.	Nation	Player
1	GK	HUN	Lajos Hegedűs
2	DF	HUN	Tibor Nagy
4	DF	HUN	Sándor Hidvégi
5	DF	HUN	Dávid Kelemen
7	MF	HUN	László Zsidai
8	FW	HUN	Norbert Csiki
9	FW	HUN	András Pál
11	MF	HUN	Tibor Ladányi
12	DF	HUN	Dávid Kálnoki-Kis
16	MF	HUN	Zsolt Pölöskei
17	FW	HUN	Patrik Vass
18	FW	HUN	Barnabás Bese

No.	Pos.	Nation	Player
19	MF	HUN	József Kanta
20	FW	HUN	Ferenc Rácz
21	DF	SRB	Dragan Vukmir
23	DF	HUN	Dániel Vadnai
24	DF	HUN	Patrik Poór
25	FW	HUN	Márk Nikházi
27	MF	HUN	Szabolcs Varga
28	GK	ITA	Federico Groppioni
30	FW	HUN	Patrik Tischler
39	DF	JAM	Rafe Wolfe
91	FW	HUN	Ádám Balajti (loan from Debrecen)

== Transfers ==
=== Summer ===
In: Note: Flags indicate national team as defined under FIFA eligibility rules; some limited exceptions apply. Players may hold more than one non-FIFA nationality.

No.	Pos.	Nation	Player
2	DF	HUN	Tibor Nagy (loan return from Szigetszentmiklós)
4	DF	HUN	Sándor Hidvégi (from Zalaegerszeg)
10	MF	HUN	János Lázok (from (Germany) Duisburg)
13	FW	HUN	Ádám Hrepka (loan return from Paksi SE)
20	FW	HUN	Ferenc Rácz (from Kozármisleny)
31	FW	HUN	Balázs Batizi-Pócsi (from Nyíregyháza)
—	FW	HUN	Roland Frőhlich (loan from Pécs)

Out: Note: Flags indicate national team as defined under FIFA eligibility rules; some limited exceptions apply. Players may hold more than one non-FIFA nationality.

No.	Pos.	Nation	Player
3	MF	HUN	Sándor Hajdú (to Csákvár)
6	DF	HUN	András Gál (to Siófok)
13	DF	HUN	Adrián Szekeres (to Videoton)
21	FW	HUN	Marcell Molnár (loan to Siófok)
27	FW	HUN	Richárd Frank (loan to Tatabánya)
—	FW	HUN	Roland Frőhlich (to Pécs)

=== Winter ===
In: Note: Flags indicate national team as defined under FIFA eligibility rules; some limited exceptions apply. Players may hold more than one non-FIFA nationality.

No.	Pos.	Nation	Player
18	DF	HUN	Barnabás Bese (from youth sector)

Out: Note: Flags indicate national team as defined under FIFA eligibility rules; some limited exceptions apply. Players may hold more than one non-FIFA nationality.

No.	Pos.	Nation	Player
10	MF	HUN	János Lázok (to Paks)
13	FW	HUN	Ádám Hrepka (to (Israel) Bnei Yehuda)
15	FW	SRB	Norbert Könyves (to Paks)
27	MF	SRB	Đorđe Đurić (loan to Tatabánya)

- List of Hungarian football transfers summer 2012
- List of Hungarian football transfers winter 2012–13

== Statistics ==
=== Appearances and goals ===
Last updated on 2 June 2013.

No.	Pos	Nat	Player	Total		OTP Bank Liga		UEFA Europa League		Hungarian Cup		League Cup	
No.	Pos	Nat	Player	Apps	Goals	Apps	Goals	Apps	Goals	Apps	Goals	Apps	Goals
1	GK	(Hungary) HUN	Lajos Hegedűs	23	-23	20	-20	2	-3	0	0	1	0
2	DF	(Hungary) HUN	Tibor Nagy	10	0	5	0	0	0	1	0	4	0
4	DF	(Hungary) HUN	Sándor Hidvégi	37	3	30	3	2	0	1	0	4	0
5	DF	(Hungary) HUN	Dávid Kelemen	23	0	17	0	2	0	1	0	3	0
7	MF	(Hungary) HUN	László Zsidai	33	0	28	0	2	0	1	0	2	0
8	FW	(Hungary) HUN	Norbert Csiki	22	8	17	6	2	0	1	2	2	0
9	FW	(Hungary) HUN	András Pál	10	0	7	0	0	0	0	0	3	0
11	MF	(Hungary) HUN	Tibor Ladányi	20	2	16	1	0	0	1	0	3	1
12	DF	(Hungary) HUN	Dávid Kálnoki-Kis	13	1	12	1	1	0	0	0	0	0
16	MF	(Hungary) HUN	Zsolt Pölöskei	19	2	14	2	0	0	0	0	5	0
17	MF	(Hungary) HUN	Patrik Vass	28	4	21	4	1	0	0	0	6	0
18	FW	(Hungary) HUN	Barnabás Bese	12	0	11	0	0	0	0	0	1	0
19	MF	(Hungary) HUN	József Kanta	31	10	27	9	2	1	0	0	2	0
20	FW	(Hungary) HUN	Ferenc Rácz	14	0	6	0	2	0	1	0	5	0
21	DF	(Serbia) SRB	Dragan Vukmir	34	0	30	0	2	0	1	0	1	0
23	DF	(Hungary) HUN	Dániel Vadnai	33	0	27	0	1	0	1	0	4	0
24	DF	(Hungary) HUN	Patrik Poór	13	0	8	0	0	0	0	0	5	0
25	MF	(Hungary) HUN	Márk Nikházi	22	1	16	1	2	0	0	0	4	0
27	MF	(Hungary) HUN	Szabolcs Varga	1	0	1	0	0	0	0	0	0	0
28	GK	(Italy) ITA	Federico Groppioni	16	-19	10	-10	0	0	1	-2	5	-7
30	FW	(Hungary) HUN	Patrik Tischler	32	7	28	7	1	0	1	0	2	0
39	DF	(Jamaica) JAM	Rafe Wolfe	26	2	24	2	2	0	0	0	0	0
91	FW	(Hungary) HUN	Ádám Balajti	28	6	22	2	0	0	1	0	5	4
Youth players:
3	DF	(Hungary) HUN	Ferenc Tóth	2	0	0	0	0	0	0	0	2	0
6	MF	(Hungary) HUN	Ádám Hajdú	2	0	0	0	0	0	0	0	2	0
29	MF	(Hungary) HUN	Szilveszter Hangya	1	0	0	0	0	0	0	0	1	0
31	FW	(Hungary) HUN	Balázs Batizi-Pócsi	2	0	0	0	0	0	0	0	2	0
Players currently out on loan
27	DF	(Serbia) SRB	Đorđe Đurić	5	0	0	0	0	0	0	0	5	0
Players no longer at the club:
10	FW	(Hungary) HUN	János Lázok	6	1	3	0	2	1	1	0	0	0
13	FW	(Hungary) HUN	Ádám Hrepka	2	0	2	0	0	0	0	0	0	0
15	FW	(Hungary) HUN	Norbert Könyves	17	3	13	3	1	0	1	0	2	0

=== Top scorers ===
Includes all competitive matches. The list is sorted by shirt number when total goals are equal.

Last updated on 2 June 2013

Position	Nation	Number	Name	OTP Bank Liga	European League	Hungarian Cup	League Cup	Total
1	(Hungary)	19	József Kanta	9	1	0	0	10
2	(Hungary)	8	Norbert Csiki	6	0	2	0	8
3	(Hungary)	30	Patrik Tischler	7	0	0	0	7
4	(Hungary)	91	Ádám Balajti	2	0	0	4	6
5	(Hungary)	17	Patrik Vass	4	0	0	0	4
6	(Hungary)	15	Norbert Könyves	3	0	0	0	3
7	(Hungary)	4	Sándor Hidvégi	3	0	0	0	3
8	(Jamaica)	39	Rafe Wolfe	2	0	0	0	2
9	(Hungary)	16	Zsolt Pölöskei	2	0	0	0	2
10	(Hungary)	11	Tibor Ladányi	1	0	0	1	2
11	(Hungary)	10	János Lázok	0	1	0	0	1
12	(Hungary)	25	Márk Nikházi	1	0	0	0	1
13	(Hungary)	12	Dávid Kálnoki-Kis	1	0	0	0	1
/	/	/	Own Goals	2	0	0	0	2
			TOTALS	43	2	2	5	52

=== Disciplinary record ===
Includes all competitive matches. Players with 1 card or more included only.

Last updated on 2 June 2013

Position	Nation	Number	Name	OTP Bank Liga		Europea League		Hungarian Cup		League Cup		Total (Hu Total)	
Position	Nation	Number	Name	Booked	Sent off (straight red)	Booked	Sent off (straight red)	Booked	Sent off (straight red)	Booked	Sent off (straight red)	Booked	Sent off (straight red)
GK	(Hungary)	1	Lajos Hegedűs	1	0	0	0	0	0	0	0	1 (1)	0 (0)
DF	(Hungary)	2	Tibor Nagy	3	0	0	0	0	0	1	0	4 (3)	0 (0)
DF	(Hungary)	4	Sándor Hidvégi	2	0	0	0	0	0	0	0	2 (2)	0 (0)
DF	(Hungary)	5	Dávid Kelemen	1	1	0	0	1	0	0	0	2 (1)	1 (1)
MF	(Hungary)	7	László Zsidai	6	0	1	0	0	0	0	0	7 (6)	0 (0)
FW	(Hungary)	8	Norbert Csiki	1	0	0	0	1	0	0	0	2 (1)	0 (0)
FW	(Hungary)	10	János Lázok	0	0	1	0	0	0	0	0	1 (0)	0 (0)
MF	(Hungary)	11	Tibor Ladányi	0	0	0	0	1	0	0	0	1 (0)	0 (0)
DF	(Hungary)	12	Dávid Kálnoki-Kis	0	0	0	1	0	0	0	0	0 (0)	1 (0)
FW	(Hungary)	15	Norbert Könyves	0	0	0	0	0	0	1	0	1 (0)	0 (0)
MF	(Hungary)	16	Zsolt Pölöskei	1	0	0	0	0	0	0	0	1 (1)	0 (0)
MF	(Hungary)	17	Patrik Vass	2	0	0	0	0	0	1	0	3 (2)	0 (0)
MF	(Hungary)	19	József Kanta	3	0	0	0	0	0	0	0	3 (3)	0 (0)
FW	(Hungary)	20	Ferenc Rácz	1	0	0	0	0	0	0	0	1 (1)	0 (0)
DF	(Serbia)	21	Dragan Vukmir	3	0	1	0	0	0	0	0	4 (3)	0 (0)
DF	(Hungary)	23	Dániel Vadnai	1	0	0	1	0	0	0	0	1 (1)	1 (0)
DF	(Hungary)	24	Patrik Poór	2	0	0	0	0	0	0	0	2 (2)	0 (0)
MF	(Hungary)	25	Márk Nikházi	2	0	0	0	0	0	1	0	3 (2)	0 (0)
DF	(Serbia)	27	Đorđe Đurić	0	0	0	0	0	0	1	0	1 (0)	0 (0)
GK	(Italy)	28	Federico Groppioni	1	0	0	0	0	0	0	0	1 (1)	0 (0)
FW	(Hungary)	30	Patrik Tischler	1	0	0	0	0	0	0	0	1 (1)	0 (0)
DF	(Jamaica)	39	Rafe Wolfe	7	0	0	0	0	0	0	0	7 (7)	0 (0)
FW	(Hungary)	91	Ádám Balajti	1	0	0	0	1	0	1	0	3 (1)	0 (0)
			TOTALS	39	1	3	2	4	0	6	0	52 (39)	3 (1)

=== Overall ===
Games played	39 (30 OTP Bank Liga, 2 UEFA Europa League, 1 Hungarian Cup and 6 Hungarian League Cup)
Games won	16 (15 OTP Bank Liga, 0 UEFA Europa League, 0 Hungarian Cup and 1 Hungarian League Cup)
Games drawn	10 (6 OTP Bank Liga, 1 UEFA Europa League, 1 Hungarian Cup and 2 Hungarian League Cup)
Games lost	13 (9 OTP Bank Liga, 1 UEFA Europa League, 0 Hungarian Cup and 3 Hungarian League Cup)
Goals scored	52
Goals conceded	42
Goal difference	+10
Yellow cards	52
Red cards	3
Worst discipline	(Hungary) László Zsidai (7 (yellow card) , 0 (red card) )
Worst discipline	(Jamaica) Rafe Wolfe (7 (yellow card) , 0 (red card) )
Best result	3–0 (H) v Egri FC - OTP Bank Liga - 15-09-2012
Best result	3–0 (A) v Egri FC - OTP Bank Liga - 06-04-2012
Worst result	0–3 (A) v Szombathelyi Haladás - OTP Bank Liga - 21-09-2012
Most appearances	(Hungary) Sándor Hidvégi (37 appearances)
Top scorer	(Hungary) József Kanta (10 goals)
Points	58/117 (49.57%)

Last updated: 2 June 2013

== Nemzeti Bajnokság I ==
=== Matches ===
29 July 2012 1	MTK Budapest	3–1	Kaposvár	Budapest, Pest County
15:30 CEST	Tischler 12'; Wolfe 67'; Könyves 77'	(Report)	Waltner 90'	Stadium: Hidegkuti Nándor Stadium; Attendance: 1,000; Referee: (Hungary) Roland Veizer

5 August 2012 2	Kecskemét	1–1	MTK Budapest	Kecskemét, Bács-Kiskun County
17:00 CEST	Sós 43'	(Report)	Könyves 75'	Stadium: Széktói Stadion; Attendance: 1,700; Referee: (Hungary) Tamás Bognár

12 August 2012 3	MTK Budapest	0–0	Pécs	Budapest, Pest County
17:00 CEST		(Report)		Stadium: Hidegkuti Nándor Stadium; Attendance: 1,000; Referee: (Hungary) Viktor Kassai

19 August 2012 4	Pápa	0–2	MTK Budapest	Pápa, Veszprém County
16:30 CEST		(Report)	Nikházi 85'; Hidvégi 90+5'	Stadium: Stadion Várkerti; Attendance: 400; Referee: (Hungary) István Vad

24 August 2012 5	MTK Budapest	2–1	Újpest	Budapest, Pest County
19:00 CEST	Iandoli 55' (o.g.); Csiki 73'	(Report)	Kabát 47'	Stadium: Hidegkuti Nándor Stadium; Attendance: 2,000; Referee: (Hungary) Dániel Becséri

31 August 2012 6	Budapest Honvéd	1–2	MTK Budapest	Budapest, Pest County
19:00 CEST	Diaby 89'	(Report)	Kanta 41', 56' (pen.)	Stadium: Bozsik Stadion; Attendance: 2,000; Referee: (Hungary) Ádám Radványi

15 September 2012 7	MTK Budapest	3–0	Eger	Budapest, Pest County
18:30 CEST	Tischler 61', 77', 82'	(Report)		Stadium: Hidegkuti Nándor Stadium; Attendance: 1,500; Referee: (Hungary) Zoltán Iványi

21 September 2012 8	Szombathely	3–0	MTK Budapest	Szombathely, Vas County
17:00 CEST	Iszlai 24' (pen.); Kenesei 27'; Halmosi 55'	(Report)		Stadium: Rohonci Street Stadium; Attendance: 3,000; Referee: (Hungary) Péter Solymosi

28 September 2012 9	MTK Budapest	1–1	Siófok	Budapest, Pest County
19:00 CEST	Kanta 81'	(Report)	Kiss 58'	Stadium: Hidegkuti Nándor Stadium; Attendance: 800; Referee: (Hungary) Tamás Bognár

5 October 2012 10	Diósgyőr	2–1	MTK Budapest	Miskolc, Borsod-Abaúj-Zemplén County
19:00 CEST	Tisza 10'; Elek 66'	(Report)	Kanta 41' (pen.)	Stadium: DVTK Stadion; Attendance: 8,000; Referee: (Hungary) Ádám Farkas

19 October 2012 11	MTK Budapest	3–2	Videoton	Budapest, Pest County
17:00 CEST	Tischler 21', 86'; Csiki 33'	(Report)	Nikolić 81' (pen.); Sándor 90+2'	Stadium: Hidegkuti Nándor Stadium; Attendance: 1,000; Referee: (Hungary) Ádám Németh

27 October 2012 12	Paks	0–0	MTK Budapest	Paks, Tolna County
18:30 CEST		(Report)		Stadium: Stadion PSE; Attendance: 1,000; Referee: (Hungary) Sándor Andó-Szabó

3 November 2012 13	MTK Budapest	4–2	Ferencváros	Budapest, Pest County
14:00 CET	Csiki 10', 44'; Hidvégi 90'; Könyves 90+2'	(Report)	Józsi 37'; Böde 80'	Stadium: Hidegkuti Nándor Stadium; Attendance: 4,000; Referee: (Hungary) Viktor Kassai

10 November 2012 14	MTK Budapest	1–3	Győr	Budapest, Pest County
18:30 CET	Balajti 75'	(Report)	Varga 30'; Trajković 39'; Völgyi 65'	Stadium: Hidegkuti Nándor Stadium; Attendance: 1,500; Referee: (Hungary) Péter Solymosi

17 November 2012 15	Debrecen	0–2	MTK Budapest	Debrecen, Hajdú-Bihar County
16:00 CET		(Report)	Kanta 9'; Korhut 77' (o.g.)	Stadium: Stadion Oláh Gábor Út; Attendance: 6,000; Referee: (Hungary) István Vad

23 November 2012 16	Kaposvár	0–0	MTK Budapest	Kaposvár, Somogy County
17:00 CET		(Report)		Stadium: Stadion Kaposvár Rákóczi; Attendance: 2,000; Referee: (Hungary) Ádám Farkas

1 December 2012 17	MTK Budapest	3–1	Kecskemét	Budapest, Pest County
16:30 CET	Csiki 11', 30'; Vass 40'	(Report)	Litsingi 72'	Stadium: Hidegkuti Nándor Stadium; Attendance: 1,100; Referee: (Hungary) Zsolt Szabó

1 March 2013 18	Pécs	2–1	MTK Budapest	Pécs, Baranya County
17:00 CET	Zeljkovič 8'; Grumić 25'	(Report)	Ladányi 36'	Stadium: Stadion PMFC; Attendance: 2,500; Referee: (Hungary) Péter Solymosi

9 March 2013 19	MTK Budapest	2–0	Pápa	Budapest, Pest County
16:00 CET	Wolfe 52'; Hidvégi 84'	(Report)		Stadium: Hidegkuti Nándor Stadium; Attendance: 800; Referee: (Hungary) József Berger

30 April 2013 20	Újpest	1–1	MTK Budapest	Budapest, Pest County
18:00 CEST	Vasiljević 12'	(Report)	Kanta 90'	Stadium: Szusza Ferenc Stadium; Attendance: 2,500; Referee: (Hungary) Sándor Andó-Szabó

30 March 2013 21	MTK Budapest	1–0	Budapest Honvéd	Budapest, Pest County
14:00 CET	Pölöskei 47'	(Report)		Stadium: Hidegkuti Nándor Stadium; Attendance: 1,500; Referee: (Hungary) Zsolt Szabó

6 April 2013 22	Eger	0–3	MTK Budapest	Vác, Pest County
18:30 CEST		(Report)	Vass 4'; Kanta 18' (pen.), 39'	Stadium: Stadion Városi Vác; Attendance: 300; Referee: (Hungary) Gergely Szőts

13 April 2013 23	MTK Budapest	0–1	Szombathely	Budapest, Pest County
16:00 CEST		(Report)	Radó 5'	Stadium: Hidegkuti Nándor Stadium; Attendance: 1,000; Referee: (Hungary) Dániel Becséri

19 April 2013 24	Siófok	2–1	MTK Budapest	Siófok, Somogy County
17:00 CEST	Pál 77'; Timár 90+2'	(Report)	Tischler 62'	Stadium: Révész Street Stadium; Attendance: 150; Referee: (Hungary) Ádám Németh

27 April 2013 25	MTK Budapest	2–0	Diósgyőr	Budapest, Pest County
14:00 CEST	Vass 41'; Balajti 87'	(Report)		Stadium: Hidegkuti Nándor Stadium; Attendance: 1,600; Referee: (Hungary) István Vad

3 May 2013 26	Videoton	2–0	MTK Budapest	Székesfehérvár, Fejér County
17:00 CEST	Mitrović 5'; Nikolić 84'	(Report)		Stadium: Stadion Sóstói; Attendance: 2,800; Referee: (Hungary) Tamás Bognár

10 May 2013 27	MTK Budapest	1–0	Paks	Budapest, Pest County
17:00 CEST	Pölöskei 86'	(Report)		Stadium: Hidegkuti Nándor Stadium; Attendance: 200; Referee: (Hungary) Viktor Kassai

18 May 2013 28	Ferencváros	2–0	MTK Budapest	Győr, Győr-Moson-Sopron County
14:00 CEST	Somália 52'; Böde 68'	(Report)		Stadium: ETO Park; Attendance: 2,500; Referee: (Hungary) Viktor Kassai

25 May 2013 29	Győr	1–0	MTK Budapest	Győr, Győr-Moson-Sopron County
16:00 CEST	Trajković 20'	(Report)		Stadium: ETO Park; Attendance: 4,500; Referee: (Hungary) Zsolt Szabó

1 June 2013 30	MTK Budapest	3–1	Debrecen	Budapest, Pest County
16:00 CEST	Kálnoki-Kis 20'; Kanta 52'; Vass 70'	(Report)	Bódi 86'	Stadium: Hidegkuti Nándor Stadium; Attendance: 1,400; Referee: (Hungary) Szabolcs Szilasi

=== Classification ===
Pos	Team	Pld	W	D	L	GF	GA	GD	Pts	Qualification or relegation
2	Videoton	30	16	6	8	52	24	+28	54	Qualification for Europa League first qualifying round
3	Honvéd	30	15	7	8	50	36	+14	52	Qualification for Europa League first qualifying round
4	MTK	30	15	6	9	43	30	+13	51	
5	Ferencváros	30	13	10	7	51	36	+15	49	
6	Debrecen	30	14	4	12	47	36	+11	46	Qualification for Europa League second qualifying round (Note: Debrecen qualified for the Europa League second qualifying round as the 2012–13 Magyar Kupa winners.)

Source: mlsz.hu (in Hungarian)
Rules for classification: 1st points; 2nd overall wins; 3rd goal difference; 4th head-to-head points; 5th head-to-head goal difference; 6th head-to-head away goals scored; 7th fair-play points; 8th drawing of lots

=== Results summary ===
Overall								Home						Away					
Pld	W	D	L	GF	GA	GD	Pts	W	D	L	GF	GA	GD	W	D	L	GF	GA	GD
30	15	6	9	43	30	+13	51	11	2	2	29	13	+16	4	4	7	14	17	−3

Last updated: 2 June 2013.
Source: NB1

=== Results by round ===
Round	1	2	3	4	5	6	7	8	9	10	11	12	13	14	15	16	17	18	19	20	21	22	23	24	25	26	27	28	29	30
Ground	H	A	H	A	H	A	H	A	H	A	H	A	H	H	A	A	H	A	H	A	H	A	A	A	H	A	H	A	A	H
Result	W	D	D	W	W	W	W	L	D	L	W	D	W	L	W	D	W	L	W	D	W	W	L	L	W	L	W	L	L	W
Position	3	3	6	4	3	1	1	2	3	3	3	3	3	3	2	2	2	2	2	2	2	2	2	2	3	3	3	3	4	4

Updated to match(es) played on 2 June 2013. Source: Matches
A = Away; H = Home; W = Win; D = Draw; L = Loss

== Hungarian Cup ==
8 August 2012 1	Dunakanyar-Vác FC	2–2 (a.e.t.) (3–0 p)	MTK Budapest FC	Vác, Pest County
17:00 CEST	Farkas 64'; Palásthy 90+2'	(Report)	Csiki 49', 57'	Stadium: Stadion Városi Vác; Attendance: 400; Referee: (Hungary) Zoltán J. Kovács

== League Cup ==
=== Group stage ===
5 September 2012 1	MTK Budapest	0–1	Ferencváros	Budapest, Pest County
18:00 CEST		(Report)	Somália 12'	Stadium: Hidegkuti Nándor Stadium; Attendance: 400; Referee: (Hungary) Balázs Böcskei

11 September 2012 2	Szolnok	0–0	MTK Budapest	Szolnok, Jász-Nagykun-Szolnok County
16:30 CEST		(Report)		Stadium: Tiszaligeti Stadion; Attendance: 100; Referee: (Hungary) Ferenc Karakó

10 October 2012 3	MTK Budapest	0–1	Kecskemét	Budapest, Pest County
15:00 CEST		(Report)	Salami 66'	Stadium: Stadion Hidegkuti Nándor; Attendance: 100; Referee: (Hungary) Krisztián Pánczél

16 October 2012 4	MTK Budapest	4–2	Szolnok	Budapest, Pest County
13:00 CEST	Balajti 9', 41' (pen.), 50'; Ladányi 68'	(Report)	Kocsis 6', 45'	Stadium: Stadion Hidegkuti Nándor; Attendance: 50; Referee: (Hungary) Roland Veizer

13 November 2012 5	Kecskemét	1–1	MTK Budapest	Kecskemét, Bács-Kiskun County
18:00 CET	Burgos 46'	(Report)	Balajti 80' (pen.)	Stadium: Széktói Stadion; Attendance: 200; Referee: (Hungary) Zoltán J. Kovács

5 December 2012 6	Ferencváros	2–0	MTK Budapest	Budapest, Pest County
17:00 CEST	Perić 1'; Máté 16'	(Report)		Stadium: Stadion Albert Flórián; Attendance: 300; Referee: (Hungary) Viktor Kassai

==== Classification ====
Pos	Team	Pld	W	D	L	GF	GA	GD	Pts	Qualification
1	Ferencváros	6	5	1	0	14	4	+10	16	Advance to knockout phase
2	Kecskemét	6	2	3	1	12	7	+5	9	
3	MTK	6	1	2	3	5	7	−2	5	
4	Szolnok	6	0	2	4	5	18	−13	2	

Rules for classification: 1) points; 2) goal difference; 3) number of goals scored.

== UEFA Europa League ==
The First and Second Qualifying Round draws took place at UEFA headquarters in Nyon, Switzerland on 25 June 2012.

5 July 2012 Q1 Leg 1	MTK Budapest FC (Hungary)	1–1	(Slovakia) FK Senica	Budapest
20:15 CEST	Lázok 30'	(Report)	Blackburn 58'	Stadium: Hidegkuti Nándor Stadium; Attendance: 3,000; Referee: (Portugal) João Ferreira

12 July 2012 Q1 Leg 2	FK Senica (Slovakia)	2–1 (3–2 agg.)	(Hungary) MTK Budapest FC	Senica
19:30 CEST	Blackburn 72'; Kalabiška 87'	(Report)	Kanta 51' (pen.)	Stadium: Štadión FK Senica; Attendance: 2,684; Referee: (Ukraine) Oleksandr Derdo
