= Ayub El Harrak =

Spanish footballer

Ayub
Personal information
- Full name: Ayub El Harrak Rouas
- Date of birth: 26 August 1994 (age 32)
- Place of birth: Barcelona, Spain
- Height: 1.88 m (6 ft 2 in)
- Position: Midfielder

Team information
- Current team: Guijuelo

Youth career
- Argentona
- Premià de Mar
- Vilassar de Mar
- Mataró

Senior career*
Years	Team	Apps	(Gls)
2012–2013	Mataró	5	(2)
2013–2014	MTK	4	(0)
2014–2015	Valladolid B	21	(3)
2015–2016	Girona	0	(0)
2015–2016	→ Marbella (loan)	7	(0)
2016	→ Guijuelo (loan)	15	(3)
2016–2017	Guijuelo	0	(0)
2017	CR Al Hoceima	?	(?)
2018–	Guijuelo	5	(0)

International career
2014	Morocco U23		
- * Club domestic league appearances and goals as of 17 February 2018

Ayub El Harrak Rouas (born 26 August 1994), simply known as Ayub, is a Moroccan footballer who plays for CD Guijuelo as a central midfielder.

== Club career ==
Born in Barcelona, Catalonia, Ayub graduated from CE Mataró's youth setup, and made his senior debuts in the 2012–13 campaign, in the regional leagues. On 19 July 2013 he signed a two-year deal with Hungarian Nemzeti Bajnokság I side MTK Budapest FC.

Ayub played his first match as a professional on 9 August, coming on as a late substitute in a 0–1 home loss against Szombathelyi Haladás. He appeared in further three matches during his first and only season at the club, totalling 136 minutes of action.

On 21 July 2014 Ayub returned to Spain, joining Segunda División B side Real Valladolid B. On 13 July of the following year he moved to Girona FC, being immediately loaned to Marbella FC also in the third tier.

== International career ==
On 10 December 2014, Ayub was called to the Morocco U-23 national team.

== Career statistics ==
As of 18 April 2015

Club	Season	League		Cup		League Cup		Europe		Total	
Club	Season	Apps	Goals	Apps	Goals	Apps	Goals	Apps	Goals	Apps	Goals
Mataró	2012–13	5	2	—						5	2
MTK	2013–14	4	0	0	0	5	0	—		9	0
Valladolid B	2014–15	21	3	—						21	3
Career Total		30	5	0	0	5	0	0	0	35	5
