= Sasa Macura =

Australian football player (born 1991)

Personal information
- Full name: Sasa Macura
- Date of birth: 28 November 1991 (age 34)
- Place of birth: Knin, Croatia
- Position: Midfielder

Youth career
- Dee Why Swans
- Northern Tigers
- APIA Leichhardt Tigers
- Bonnyrigg White Eagles

Senior career*
Years	Team	Apps	(Gls)
2010–2013	MTK Budapest	4	(0)
2010–2011	MTK Budapest II	33	(1)
2013	→ Szigetszentmiklósi (loan)	3	(0)
2014–2016	Blacktown City	71	(11)
2017–2018	Manly United	44	(3)
2019	Rockdale City	20	(1)
2020	Manly United	2	(0)
- * Club domestic league appearances and goals as of 1 June 2020

Sasa Macura is an Australian football (soccer) player who plays as a midfielder for Manly United in the National Premier Leagues NSW.

Born in Australia, Macura played youth football for Northern Tigers, APIA Leichhardt and Bonnyrigg White Eagles before moving to Hungary. There, he made his professional debut for MTK Budapest as well as playing in the Nemzeti Bajnokság II for MTK's reserve team and Szigetszentmiklósi. In 2014, he returned to Australia to play for Blacktown City. He moved to Manly United in 2017.

== Early life ==
Macura was born in Knin, Croatia. He moved to Sydney as a child and attended Narrabeen Sports High School. He first played football for Dee Why Swans on Sydney's Northern Beaches.

== Club career ==
Macura played youth football for Northern Tigers FC, APIA Leichhardt Tigers and Bonnyrigg White Eagles.

Aged 18, Macura moved to Europe, initially to trial with Serbian club FK Vojvodina, where he was offered a contract. However, on the advice of his manager, Macura instead accepted a contract with Hungarian Nemzeti Bajnokság I club MTK Budapest. He made his competitive first-team debut for MTK in the 2010–11 Ligakupa in a loss to fellow top-tier side Vasas in July 2010. In early 2013, Macura moved on loan to Szigetszentmiklósi in the Nemzeti Bajnokság II.

In 2014, Macura returned to Sydney to play for Blacktown City in the National Premier Leagues NSW.
