= András Pintér =

Hungarian footballer

Personal information
- Full name: András Pintér
- Date of birth: 1 April 1994 (age 32)
- Place of birth: Kecskemét, Hungary
- Position: Midfielder

Youth career
- 2003–2008: Kecskemét
- 2008–2011: MTK Budapest

Senior career*
Years	Team	Apps	(Gls)
2011–2018	MTK Budapest	4	(1)
2012–2016	→ MTK Budapest II	52	(4)
2014–2015	→ Sopron (loan)	25	(1)
2016–2017	→ Kaposvár (loan)	25	(2)
2018–	Tiszakécske	10	(0)

International career^{‡}
2010–2011	Hungary U17		
2012–2013	Hungary U19		
2014–	Hungary U20	1	(0)
- * Club domestic league appearances and goals as of 7 February 2022 ‡ National team caps and goals as of 11 May 2014

András Pintér (born 1 April 1994) is a Hungarian football player who currently plays for MTK Hungaria FC.

== Club statistics ==
Appearances and goals by club, season and competition
Club	Season	League			Cup		League Cup		Europe		Total	
Club	Season	Division	Apps	Goals	Apps	Goals	Apps	Goals	Apps	Goals	Apps	Goals
MTK Budapest II
MTK Budapest II	2012–13	Nemzeti Bajnokság III	23	3	—		—|–		–	23	3	
MTK Budapest II	2015–16	Nemzeti Bajnokság III	29	1	—		—		—		29	1
MTK Budapest II	Total		52	4	0	0	0	0	0	0	52	4
MTK Budapest
MTK Budapest	2011–12	Nemzeti Bajnokság II	2	1	0	0	0	0	—		2	1
MTK Budapest	2013–14	Nemzeti Bajnokság I	2	0	0	0	5	0	—		7	0
MTK Budapest	2015–16	Nemzeti Bajnokság I	0	0	1	0	—		—		7	0
MTK Budapest	Total		4	1	1	0	5	0	0	0	10	1
Sopron	2014–15	Nemzeti Bajnokság II	25	1	1	0	4	0	—		30	1
Kaposvár	2016–17	Nemzeti Bajnokság III	25	2	0	0	—		—		25	2
Tiszakécske	2017–18	Nemzeti Bajnokság III	10	0	0	0	—		—		10	0
Career total			113	8	2	0	9	0	0	0	127	8

Updated to games played as of 7 February 2022.
