= Ádám Szabó (footballer) =

Hungarian footballer

Personal information
- Full name: Ádám Imre Szabó
- Date of birth: 2 January 1988 (age 38)
- Place of birth: Budapest, Hungary
- Height: 1.80 m (5 ft 11 in)
- Position: Midfielder

Team information
- Current team: Szentendre
- Number: 5

Youth career
- 1997–2001: BVSC Budapest
- 2001–2006: MTK Budapest

Senior career*
| Years | Team | Apps | (Gls) |
| 2006–2012 | MTK Budapest | 80 | (8) |
| 2012 | Mezőkövesd | 9 | (0) |
| 2012–2014 | Putnok | 30 | (5) |
| 2014–2015 | Kazincbarcika | 21 | (2) |
| 2020–2021 | Csep-Gól | 8 | (0) |
| 2021– | Szentendre | 10 | (2) |

International career
| 2004–2005 | Hungary U-17 | 3 | (0) |
| 2007– | Hungary U-21 | 6 | (1) |
- * Club domestic league appearances and goals as of 7 February 2022

Ádám Szabó (born 2 January 1988 in Budapest) is a Hungarian football player who currently plays for Putnok VSE. Szabó retired in July 2015.
