= Marcell Molnár =

Hungarian footballer

Personal information
- Full name: Marcell Molnár
- Date of birth: 26 August 1990 (age 36)
- Place of birth: Sátoraljaújhely, Hungary
- Height: 1.87 m (6 ft 2 in)
- Position: Striker

Team information
- Current team: Nyíregyháza
- Number: 12

Youth career
- 2003–2004: Karcsa
- 2004–2009: MTK Budapest

Senior career*
Years	Team	Apps	(Gls)
2007–2012	MTK Budapest	25	(1)
2007–2012	MTK Budapest II	63	(32)
2012–2013	Siófok	8	(0)
2013–2014	BKV Előre	23	(6)
2014–2015	Nyíregyháza	5	(1)
2015	Siófok	9	(0)
2015–2016	Mezőkövesd	21	(5)
2016–2019	Veszprém	33	(5)
2019–2020	Balatonfüred	8	(4)
2020–2021	Gyöngyös	27	(5)
2021–	Dabas-Gyón		
- * Club domestic league appearances and goals as of 27 May 2021

Marcell Molnár (born 26 August 1990) is a Hungarian football player who currently plays for the Austrian club TSU Jeging (Coach Erwin Dankl).

== Career statistics ==
As of 19 December 2021

Appearances and goals by club, season and competition
Club	Season	League			Cup		Continental		Other		Total	
Club	Season	Division	Apps	Goals	Apps	Goals	Apps	Goals	Apps	Goals	Apps	Goals
MTK Budapest II	2007–08	Nemzeti Bajnokság III	15	11	—		—		—		15	11
MTK Budapest II	2008–09	Nemzeti Bajnokság II	17	10	—		—		—		17	10
MTK Budapest II	2009–10	Nemzeti Bajnokság II	13	6	—		—		—		13	6
MTK Budapest II	2010–11	Nemzeti Bajnokság II	18	5	—		—		—		18	5
MTK Budapest II	Total		63	32	0	0	0	0	0	0	63	32
MTK Budapest	2007–08	Nemzeti Bajnokság I	4	0	0	0	—		8	1	12	1
MTK Budapest	2008–09	Nemzeti Bajnokság I	3	0	0	0	—		6	0	9	0
MTK Budapest	2009–10	Nemzeti Bajnokság I	9	1	3	2	—		2	2	14	5
MTK Budapest	2010–11	Nemzeti Bajnokság I	1	0	1	0	—		4	2	6	2
MTK Budapest	2011–12	Nemzeti Bajnokság II	8	0	4	3	—		5	0	17	3
MTK Budapest	Total		25	1	8	5	0	0	25	5	58	11
Siófok	2012–13	Nemzeti Bajnokság I	8	0	4	0	—		4	0	16	0
Siófok	2014–15	Nemzeti Bajnokság II	9	0	0	0	—		—		9	0
Siófok	Total		17	0	4	0	0	0	4	0	25	0
BKV Előre	2012–13	Nemzeti Bajnokság II	9	2	0	0	—		—		9	2
BKV Előre	2013–14	Nemzeti Bajnokság III	14	4	2	2	—		—		16	6
BKV Előre	Total		23	6	2	2	0	0	0	0	25	8
Nyíregyháza	2013–14	Nemzeti Bajnokság II	0	0	2	0	—		—		2	0
Nyíregyháza	2014–15	Nemzeti Bajnokság I	5	1	1	1	—		6	0	12	2
Nyíregyháza	Total		5	1	3	1	0	0	6	0	14	2
Mezőkövesd	2015–16	Nemzeti Bajnokság III	21	5	1	1	—		—		22	6
Mezőkövesd	Total		21	5	1	1	0	0	0	0	22	6
Veszprém	2016–17	Nemzeti Bajnokság III	25	1	0	0	—		—		25	1
Veszprém	2017–18	Megyei Bajnokság I	21	11	0	0	—		2	2	23	13
Veszprém	Total		46	12	0	0	0	0	2	2	48	14
Balatonfüred	2019–20	Megyei Bajnokság I	8	4	0	0	—		—		8	4
Balatonfüred	Total		8	4	0	0	0	0	0	0	8	4
Gyöngyös	2020–21	Nemzeti Bajnokság III	27	5	2	1	—		—		29	6
Gyöngyös	Total		27	5	2	1	0	0	0	0	29	6
Career total			235	66	20	10	0	0	37	7	292	83
