= Sándor Hajdú =

Hungarian footballer

Personal information
- Full name: Sándor Hajdú
- Date of birth: 21 January 1985 (age 41)
- Place of birth: Budapest, Hungary
- Position: Midfielder

Youth career
- 2003–2006: MTK Budapest
- 2004: → Siófok (loan)

Senior career*
| Years | Team | Apps | (Gls) |
| 2006–2012 | MTK Budapest | 17 | (0) |
| 2006–2008 | → Soroksár (loan) | 25 | (2) |
| 2008–2012 | → MTK Budapest II | 54 | (1) |
| 2012–2017 | Csákvár | 88 | (1) |
- * Club domestic league appearances and goals as of 29 January 2021

Sándor Hajdú (born 21 January 1985 in Budapest) is a Hungarian football player who currently plays for MTK Hungária FC.

== Career statistics ==
As of 19 December 2021

Appearances and goals by club, season and competition
| Club | Season | League | | | Cup | | Continental | | Other | | Total | |
| Club | Season | Division | Apps | Goals | Apps | Goals | Apps | Goals | Apps | Goals | Apps | Goals |
|---|---|---|---|---|---|---|---|---|---|---|---|---|
| Soroksár | 2006–07 | Nemzeti Bajnokság II | 20 | 2 | 1 | 0 | — | | — | | 21 | 2 |
| Soroksár | 2007–08 | Nemzeti Bajnokság II | 5 | 0 | 1 | 0 | — | | — | | 6 | 0 |
| Soroksár | Total | | 25 | 2 | 2 | 0 | 0 | 0 | 0 | 0 | 27 | 2 |
| MTK Budapest II | 2007–08 | Nemzeti Bajnokság III | 13 | 0 | — | | — | | — | | 13 | 0 |
| MTK Budapest II | 2008–09 | Nemzeti Bajnokság II | 14 | 0 | — | | — | | — | | 14 | 0 |
| MTK Budapest II | 2009–10 | Nemzeti Bajnokság II | 12 | 0 | — | | — | | — | | 12 | 0 |
| MTK Budapest II | 2010–11 | Nemzeti Bajnokság II | 15 | 1 | — | | — | | — | | 15 | 1 |
| MTK Budapest II | Total | | 54 | 1 | 0 | 0 | 0 | 0 | 0 | 0 | 54 | 1 |
| MTK Budapest | 2007–08 | Nemzeti Bajnokság I | 0 | 0 | 0 | 0 | — | | 4 | 0 | 4 | 0 |
| MTK Budapest | 2008–09 | Nemzeti Bajnokság I | 1 | 0 | 0 | 0 | — | | 6 | 0 | 7 | 0 |
| MTK Budapest | 2010–11 | Nemzeti Bajnokság I | 10 | 0 | 3 | 0 | — | | 3 | 0 | 16 | 0 |
| MTK Budapest | 2011–12 | Nemzeti Bajnokság II | 7 | 0 | 4 | 0 | — | | 7 | 0 | 18 | 0 |
| MTK Budapest | Total | | 17 | 0 | 7 | 0 | 0 | 0 | 20 | 0 | 44 | 0 |
| Csákvár | 2012–13 | Nemzeti Bajnokság II | 25 | 1 | 0 | 0 | — | | — | | 25 | 1 |
| Csákvár | 2013–14 | Nemzeti Bajnokság III | 25 | 0 | 3 | 0 | — | | — | | 28 | 0 |
| Csákvár | 2014–15 | Nemzeti Bajnokság II | 21 | 0 | 5 | 0 | — | | 6 | 0 | 32 | 0 |
| Csákvár | 2015–16 | Nemzeti Bajnokság II | 13 | 0 | 3 | 0 | — | | — | | 16 | 0 |
| Csákvár | 2016–17 | Nemzeti Bajnokság II | 4 | 0 | 2 | 0 | — | | — | | 6 | 0 |
| Csákvár | Total | | 88 | 1 | 13 | 0 | 0 | 0 | 6 | 0 | 107 | 1 |
| Career total | | | 184 | 4 | 22 | 0 | 0 | 0 | 26 | 0 | 232 | 4 |
