= Márk Nikházi =

Hungarian footballer

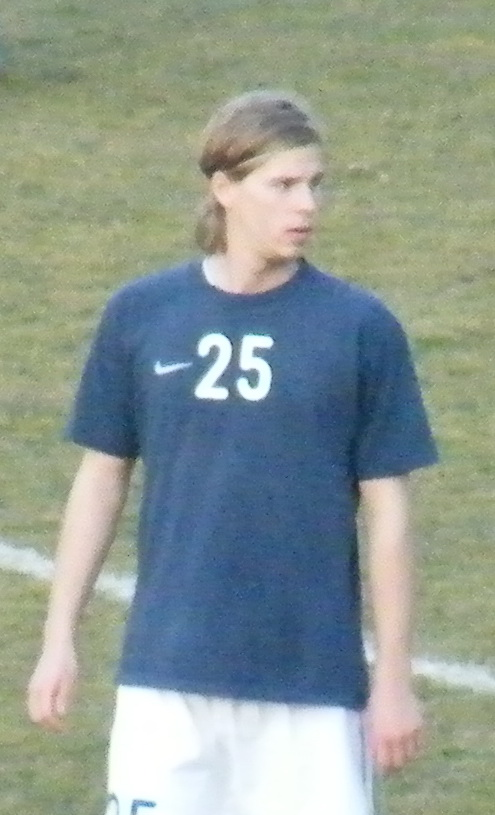

Personal information
- Date of birth: 2 February 1989 (age 37)
- Place of birth: Mosonmagyaróvár, Hungary
- Height: 1.71 m (5 ft 7 1/2 in)
- Position: Midfielder

Team information
- Current team: Budafok (manager)

Youth career
- 2003–2004: Győr
- 2004–2007: MTK

Senior career*
Years	Team	Apps	(Gls)
2007–2013	MTK Budapest	58	(7)
2013–2017	Diósgyőr	54	(6)
2014–2015	→ Dunaújváros (loan)	23	(6)
2017	MTK Budapest	6	(0)
2017–2018	Paks	10	(0)
2019–2020	III. Kerületi	22	(3)
2020–2023	Siófok	57	(4)

International career
2005–2006	Hungary U-17	6	(2)
2007–2008	Hungary U-19	4	(1)
2008–2009	Hungary U-20	2	(0)

Managerial career
- 2024: Budafok (caretaker)
- 2024–2025: Budafok
- 2025: Zalaegerszeg (assistant)
- 2025: Dorog
- 2025–: Budafok
- * Club domestic league appearances and goals

Márk Nikházi (born 2 February 1989) is a Hungarian football coach and a former player who is the current manager of Budafok.

Márk Nikházi was a member of the Hungary squad that reached the 2006 UEFA European Under-17 Football Championship finals in Luxembourg.

== Career ==
On 1 February 2019, Nikházi joined III. Kerületi TVE.

== Club statistics ==
As of 7 February 2022

Appearances and goals by club, season and competition
Club	Season	League			Cup		League Cup		Europe		Total	
Club	Season	Division	Apps	Goals	Apps	Goals	Apps	Goals	Apps	Goals	Apps	Goals
MTK Budapest	2007–08	Nemzeti Bajnokság I	0	0	0	0	1	0	0	0	1	0
MTK Budapest	2008–09	Nemzeti Bajnokság I	4	0	1	0	8	3	0	0	13	3
MTK Budapest	2009–10	Nemzeti Bajnokság I	7	0	4	0	5	1	0	0	16	1
MTK Budapest	2010–11	Nemzeti Bajnokság I	11	0	3	1	2	0	0	0	16	1
MTK Budapest	2011–12	Nemzeti Bajnokság II	20	6	5	0	7	0	0	0	32	6
MTK Budapest	2012–13	Nemzeti Bajnokság I	16	1	0	0	4	0	2	0	22	1
MTK Budapest	Total		58	7	13	1	27	4	2	0	100	12
Diósgyőr	2013–14	Nemzeti Bajnokság I	22	4	5	0	7	1	0	0	34	5
Diósgyőr	2014–15	Nemzeti Bajnokság I	4	0	0	0	0	0	3	0	7	0
Diósgyőr	2015–16	Nemzeti Bajnokság I	16	1	0	0	—		—		16	1
Diósgyőr	2016–17	Nemzeti Bajnokság I	12	1	2	1	—		—		14	2
Diósgyőr	Total		54	6	7	1	7	1	3	0	71	8
Dunaújváros (loan)	2014–15	Nemzeti Bajnokság I	23	6	0	0	3	2	0	0	26	8
MTK Budapest	2016–17	Nemzeti Bajnokság I	6	0	0	0	—		—		6	0
Paks	2017–18	Nemzeti Bajnokság I	10	0	4	1	—		—		14	1
III. Kerület	2018–19	Nemzeti Bajnokság III	9	1	0	0	—		—		9	1
III. Kerület	2019–20	Nemzeti Bajnokság III	13	2	2	0	—		—		15	2
III. Kerület	Total		22	3	2	0	0	0	0	0	24	3
Siófok	2020–21	Nemzeti Bajnokság II	22	1	2	0	—		—		23	1
Siófok	2021–22	Nemzeti Bajnokság II	16	1	0	0	—		—		16	1
Siófok	Total		38	2	2	0	0	0	0	0	40	2
Career total			201	24	28	3	37	7	5	0	281	34

== Honours ==
Diósgyőr

- Hungarian League Cup (1): 2013–14
