= Richárd Frank =

Hungarian footballer

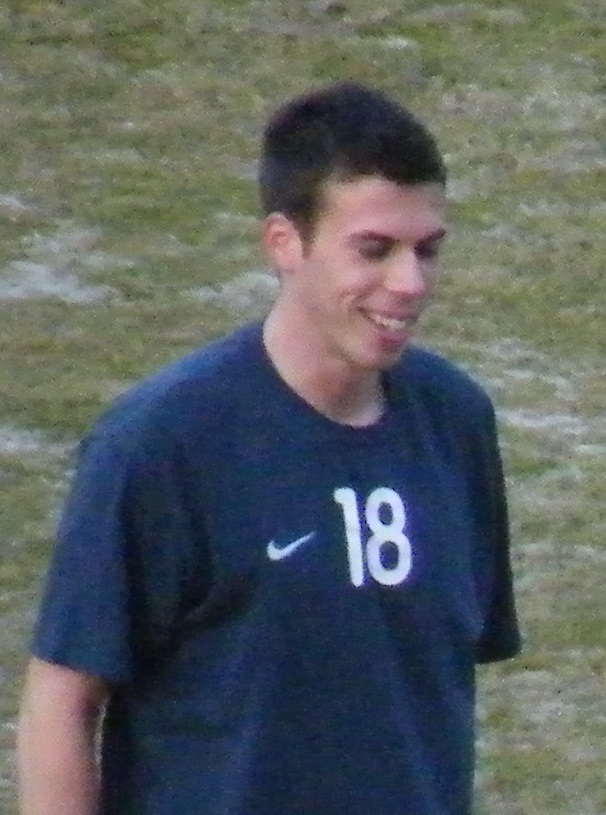
- Richárd Frank in 2011

Personal information
- Date of birth: 28 September 1990 (age 36)
- Place of birth: Pécs, Hungary
- Height: 1.82 m (5 ft 11 1/2 in)
- Position: Striker

Team information
- Current team: Pécs

Youth career
- 2002–2007: Pécs
- 2007–2010: Újpest

Senior career*
Years	Team	Apps	(Gls)
2010–2011	Újpest II	64	(30)
2011–2014	MTK	34	(6)
2012–2013	→ Tatabánya (loan)	20	(0)
2014–2015	Pécs	10	(2)
2015–2016	Vác	19	(2)
2016–2018	Pécs	23	(5)
- * Club domestic league appearances and goals as of 7 February 2022

Richárd Frank (born 28 August 1990) is a Hungarian striker who plays for Pécsi Mecsek FC.

== Career statistics ==
As of 19 December 2021

Appearances and goals by club, season and competition
Club	Season	League			Cup		Continental		Other		Total	
Club	Season	Division	Apps	Goals	Apps	Goals	Apps	Goals	Apps	Goals	Apps	Goals
Újpest II	2007–08	Nemzeti Bajnokság III	10	0	—		—		—		10	0
Újpest II	2008–09	Nemzeti Bajnokság III	25	12	1	2	—		—		26	14
Újpest II	2009–10	Nemzeti Bajnokság III	21	16	1	1	—		—		22	17
Újpest II	2010–11	Nemzeti Bajnokság II	8	2	1	0	—		—		9	2
Újpest II	Total		64	30	3	3	0	0	0	0	67	33
Újpest	2007–08	Nemzeti Bajnokság I	1	0	0	0	—		1	0	2	0
Újpest	2008–09	Nemzeti Bajnokság I	0	0	0	0	—		0	0	0	0
Újpest	2009–10	Nemzeti Bajnokság I	0	0	0	0	—		3	0	3	0
Újpest	2010–11	Nemzeti Bajnokság I	0	0	0	0	—		1	0	1	0
Újpest	Total		1	0	0	0	0	0	5	0	6	0
MTK Budapest II	2010–11	Nemzeti Bajnokság II	6	0	—		—		—		6	0
MTK Budapest II	2011–12	Nemzeti Bajnokság II	19	4	—		—		—		19	4
MTK Budapest II	Total		25	4	0	0	0	0	0	0	25	4
MTK Budapest	2010–11	Nemzeti Bajnokság I	5	1	2	0	—		0	0	7	1
MTK Budapest	2011–12	Nemzeti Bajnokság II	19	4	9	1	—		8	1	36	6
MTK Budapest	2013–14	Nemzeti Bajnokság I	4	0	2	0	—		3	0	9	1
MTK Budapest	2014–15	Nemzeti Bajnokság I	6	1	1	0	—		0	0	7	1
MTK Budapest	Total		34	6	14	1	0	0	11	1	59	9
Tatabánya	2012–13	Nemzeti Bajnokság II	20	0	0	0	—		1	0	21	0
Tatabánya	Total		20	0	0	0	0	0	1	0	21	0
Vác	2015–16	Nemzeti Bajnokság II	19	2	2	1	—		—		21	3
Vác	Total		19	2	2	1	0	0	0	0	21	3
Pécs	2014–15	Nemzeti Bajnokság I	10	2	2	0	—		4	1	16	3
Pécs	2016–17	Nemzeti Bajnokság III	13	5	0	0	—		—		13	5
Pécs	2017–18	Nemzeti Bajnokság III	10	0	0	0	—		—		10	0
Pécs	Total		33	7	2	0	0	0	4	1	39	8
Career total			196	49	12	5	0	0	21	2	238	56
