= Tibor Ladányi =

Hungarian footballer (born 1991)

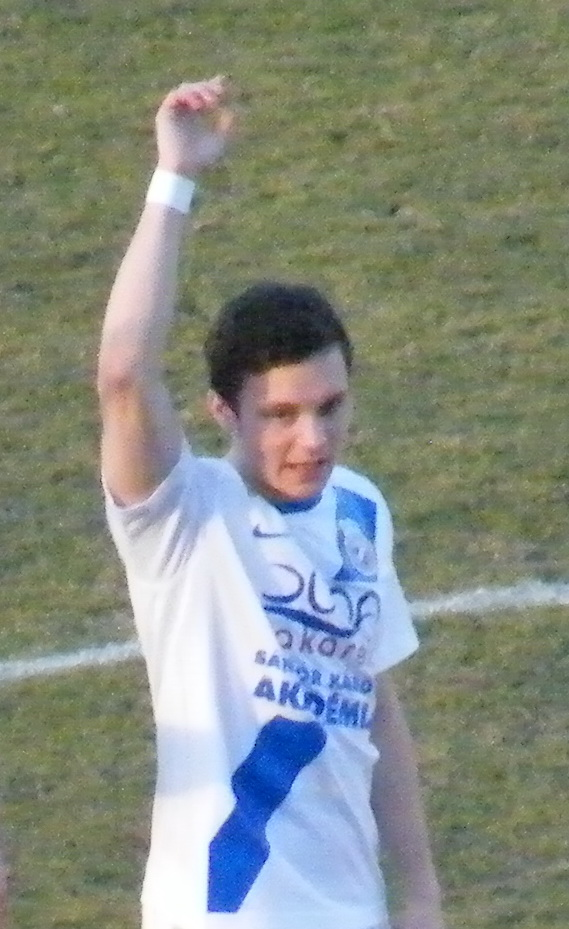

Personal information
- Date of birth: 21 November 1991 (age 34)
- Place of birth: Budapest, Hungary
- Height: 1.77 m (5 ft 10 in)
- Position: Midfielder

Team information
- Current team: Gyöngyös
- Number: 10

Youth career
- 2002–2003: BVSC Budapest
- 2003–2010: MTK Budapest

Senior career*
Years	Team	Apps	(Gls)
2010–2017	MTK Budapest	75	(5)
2015	→ Szigetszentmiklós (loan)	0	(0)
2016	→ Biberbach (loan)	8	(1)
2016–2017	→ Budafok (loan)	16	(2)
2017	Dabas	4	(0)
2017–2020	Kölleda	39	(7)
2020–2021	Dunavarsány	12	(2)
2021–	Gyöngyös	4	(3)
- * Club domestic league appearances and goals as of 7 February 2022

Tibor Ladányi (born 21 November 1991) is a Hungarian football player who currently plays for MTK Hungaria FC.

== Club statistics ==
Appearances and goals by club, season and competition
Club	Season	League		Cup		League Cup		Europe		Total	
Club	Season	Apps	Goals	Apps	Goals	Apps	Goals	Apps	Goals	Apps	Goals
MTK Budapest
MTK Budapest	2008–09	0	0	0	0	2	1	0	0	2	1
MTK Budapest	2009–10	0	0	2	0	2	0	–	–	4	0
MTK Budapest	2010–11	24	1	6	0	1	0	–	–	31	1
MTK Budapest	2011–12	18	2	7	1	6	0	–	–	31	3
MTK Budapest	2012–13	15	1	1	0	3	1	0	0	19	2
MTK Budapest	2013–14	18	1	5	0	1	0	–	–	24	1
MTK Budapest	Total	75	5	21	1	15	2	0	0	111	8
Career total		75	5	21	1	15	2	0	0	111	8

Updated to games played as of 1 June 2014.
