= Federico Groppioni =

Italian footballer (born 1984)

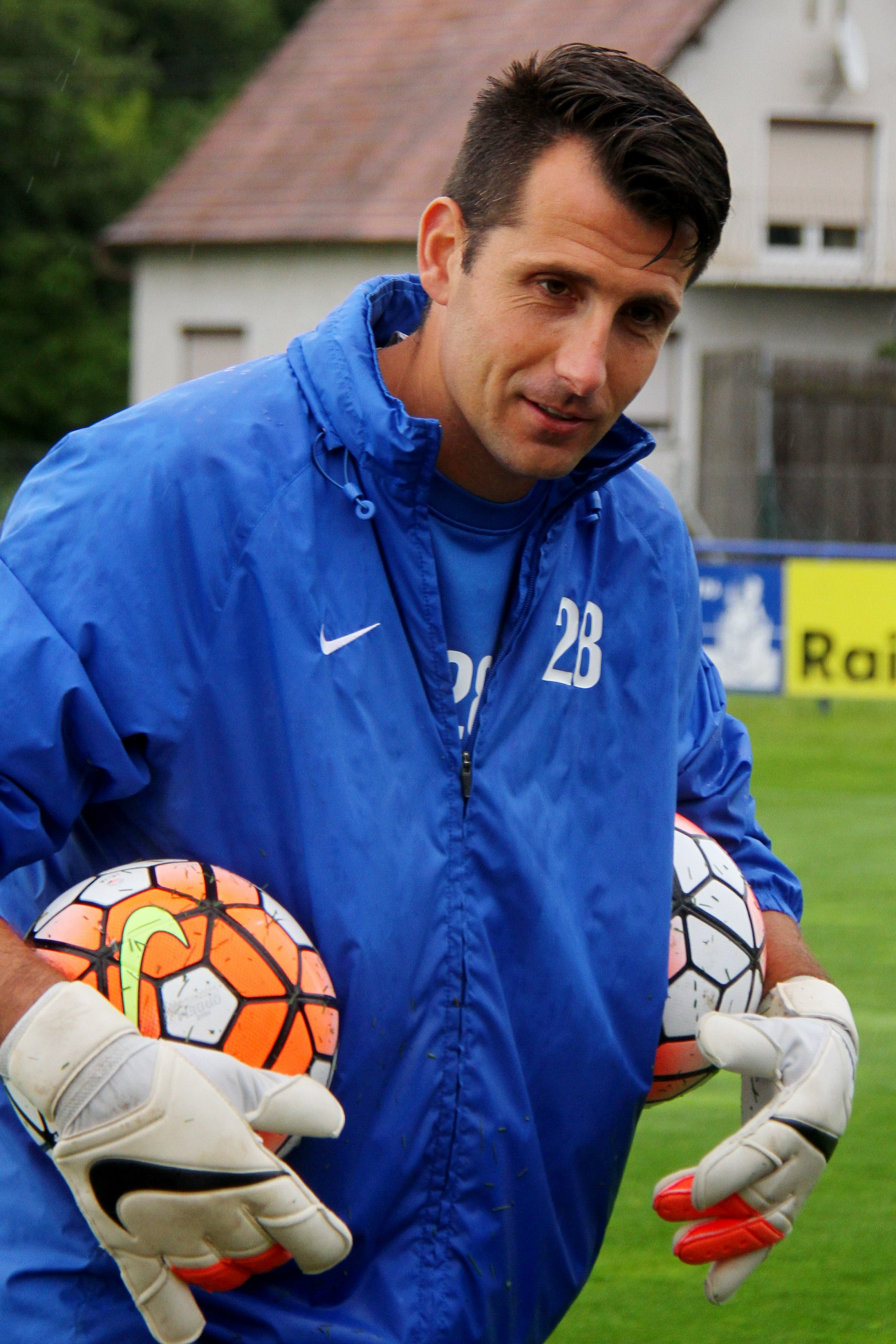

Personal information
- Full name: Federico Groppioni
- Date of birth: 17 June 1984 (age 42)
- Place of birth: Rome, Italy
- Height: 1.86 m (6 ft 1 in)
- Position: Goalkeeper

Team information
- Current team: MTK
- Number: 28

Youth career
- –2002: Napoli

Senior career*
| Years | Team | Apps | (Gls) |
| 2002–2003 | Tivoli | 2 | (0) |
| 2003–2004 | Cisco Roma | 25 | (0) |
| 2004–2005 | Frascati | 36 | (0) |
| 2005–2007 | Rieti | 48 | (0) |
| 2007–2010 | Bari | 0 | (0) |
| 2007–2008 | → Gubbio (loan) | 33 | (0) |
| 2008–2009 | → Potenza (loan) | 29 | (0) |
| 2009–2010 | → Manfredonia (loan) | 4 | (0) |
| 2010–2017 | MTK | 19 | (0) |
| 2017– | Csep-Gól FC | | |
- * Club domestic league appearances and goals as of 6 May 2016

Federico Groppioni (born 17 June 1984 in Rome) is an Italian professional football player who is currently playing for Csep-Gól FC.
