= 2005–06 MTK Budapest FC season =

MTK
2005–06 season
- Manager: József Garami
- Stadium: Hidegkuti Nándor Stadion
- Nemzeti Bajnokság I: 4th
- Magyar Kupa: Round of 16
- Highest home attendance: 4,000 v Újpest (26 November 2005, Nemzeti Bajnokság I)
- Lowest home attendance: 500 (multiple competitive matches)
- Average home league attendance: 1,343
- Biggest win: 7–0 v Pápa (Home, 15 October 2005, Nemzeti Bajnokság I)
- Biggest defeat: 0–2 v Újpest (Home, 26 November 2005, Nemzeti Bajnokság I); 2–4 v Debrecen (Home, 12 March 2006, Nemzeti Bajnokság I)

The 2005–06 season was Magyar Testgyakorlók Köre Budapest Futball Club's 97th competitive season, 11th consecutive season in the Nemzeti Bajnokság I and 101st season in existence as a football club. In addition to the domestic league, MTK participated in that season's editions of the Magyar Kupa.

== Squad ==
Squad at end of season

Note: Flags indicate national team as defined under FIFA eligibility rules; some limited exceptions apply. Players may hold more than one non-FIFA nationality.

No.	Pos.	Nation	Player
1	GK	HUN	Zoltán Végh
2	DF	SRB	Mišo Koljenović
3	DF	HUN	László Sütő
4	MF	SRB	Goran Jezdimirović
5	DF	HUN	Béla Balogh
6	FW	HUN	Ákos Kozmor
7	MF	HUN	Péter Czvitkovics
8	MF	HUN	Attila Zabos
9	FW	HUN	András Pál
10	MF	HUN	Béla Illés
11	MF	HUN	András Selei
12	DF	HUN	István Ribi
13	FW	HUN	Ádám Hrepka

No.	Pos.	Nation	Player
15	DF	HUN	Levente Horváth
17	MF	HUN	László Zsidai
18	FW	HUN	Krisztián Németh
19	MF	HUN	József Kanta
20	DF	MNE	Mladen Lambulić
21	MF	HUN	Gábor Bori
22	DF	HUN	István Rodenbücher
24	DF	HUN	Zoltán Pollák
26	GK	HUN	Levente Szántai
27	MF	HUN	Péter Bonifert
28	FW	HUN	Gábor Urbán
30	MF	HUN	Roland Lipcsei
—	GK	HUN	Zoltán Szatmári

== Competitions ==
=== Overview ===
Competition	First match	Last match	Starting round	Final position	Record							
Competition	First match	Last match	Starting round	Final position	Pld	W	D	L	GF	GA	GD	Win %
Nemzeti Bajnokság I	30 July 2005	3 June 2006	Matchday 1	4th	30	18	6	6	65	33	+32	60.00
Magyar Kupa	10 September 2005	6 December 2005	Second round	Round of 16	4	2	1	1	8	4	+4	50.00
Total					34	20	7	7	73	37	+36	58.82

Source: Competitions

=== Nemzeti Bajnokság I ===
==== League table ====
Pos	Team	Pld	W	D	L	GF	GA	GD	Pts	Qualification or relegation
2	Újpest	30	20	5	5	74	37	+37	65	Qualification for UEFA Cup first qualifying round (Note: Videoton FC Fehérvár won the 2005–06 Hungarian Cup and thereby qualified for the first qualifying round of the UEFA Cup.)
3	Fehérvár	30	19	7	4	52	24	+28	64	Qualification for UEFA Cup first qualifying round
4	MTK	30	18	6	6	65	33	+32	60	
5	Tatabánya	30	11	8	11	46	45	+1	41	
6	Ferencváros (R)	30	10	11	9	43	38	+5	41	Relegated to Nemzeti Bajnokság II (Note: Ferencvárosi TC were relegated to the Nemzeti Bajnokság II because the club failed to comply with UEFA licensing rules.)

Source: RSSSF
(R) Relegated

==== Results summary ====
Overall								Home						Away					
Pld	W	D	L	GF	GA	GD	Pts	W	D	L	GF	GA	GD	W	D	L	GF	GA	GD
30	18	6	6	65	33	+32	60	10	2	3	37	15	+22	8	4	3	28	18	+10

Source: Competitions

==== Results by round ====
Round	1	2	3	4	5	6	7	8	9	10	11	12	13	14	15	16	17	18	19	20	21	22	23	24	25	26	27	28	29	30
Ground	A	H	A	H	A	H	A	H	A	H	A	A	H	A	H	H	A	H	A	H	A	H	A	H	A	H	H	A	H	A
Result	W	W	D	W	W	D	D	W	W	W	L	W	L	D	W	W	D	L	W	W	L	D	W	W	W	L	W	W	W	L
Position	1	1	1	2	1	3	3	2	2	2	3	4	4	4	4	2	4	4	4	3	3	4	4	4	3	4	4	4	4	4
Points	3	6	7	10	13	14	15	18	21	24	24	27	27	28	31	34	35	35	38	41	41	42	45	48	51	51	54	57	60	60

A = Away; H = Home; W = Win; D = Draw; L = Loss

==== Matches ====
30 July 2005 1	Rákospalota	1–2	MTK	Budapest
18:00 CEST (UTC+2)	B. Balogh 43' (o.g.); Kapcsos (yellow card) 53'	Report	Kanta 27', (yellow card) 41'; Czvitkovics 74'	Stadium: Budai II. László Stadion; Attendance: 3,000; Referee: József Erdős; Assistant referees: P. Erős, G Erős

6 August 2005 2	MTK	2–0	Pécs	Budapest
19:00 CEST (UTC+2)	Lambulić 50'; Illés 90'	Report	Pavičević (yellow card) 26'; M. Gaál (yellow card) 59'	Stadium: Hidegkuti Nándor Stadion; Attendance: 1,000; Referee: János Megyebíró; Assistant referees: Szpisják, P. Tóth

20 August 2005 3	Debrecen	2–2	MTK	Debrecen
19:00 CEST (UTC+2)	Bogdanović 13'; Nikolov (yellow card) 43'; T. Sándor 59'; Bernáth (yellow card) 88'	Report	Jezdimirović (yellow card) 44'; Kanta 51'; B. Balogh (yellow card) 77'; Bonifert 79'	Stadium: Oláh Gábor utcai Stadion; Attendance: 9,000; Referee: Viktor Kassai

27 August 2005 4	MTK	1–0	Tatabánya	Budapest
19:00 CEST (UTC+2)	Kanta (yellow card); Z. Szabó I 79' (o.g.)	Report	Filó (yellow card)	Stadium: Hidegkuti Nándor Stadion; Attendance: 1,200; Referee: István Vad; Assistant referees: Vámos, I. Tóth; Fourth official: Arany

17 September 2005 5	Sopron	0–3	MTK	Sopron
19:00 CEST (UTC+2)	Bagoly (yellow card) 40'; Coțan (yellow card) 70'; Sifter (yellow card) 78'; Vén (yellow card) 79'; Landerl (yellow card) 80'	Report	Czvitkovics 15'; Hrepka 32', 52'; Lambulić (yellow card) 36'; Selei (yellow card) 86'	Stadium: Káposztás utcai Stadion; Attendance: 1,800; Referee: János Makai; Assistant referees: L. Varga II, Z. Kovács

25 September 2005 6	MTK	2–2	Ferencváros	Budapest
11:30 CEST (UTC+2)	B. Balogh (yellow card) 40'; Hrepka 57', (yellow card) 76'; Kanta 58' (pen.)	Report	Tőzsér (yellow card) 18', (goal) 39'; D. Rósa 40' (pen.), (yellow card) 73'; Laczkó (yellow card) 58'	Stadium: Hidegkuti Nándor Stadion; Attendance: 3,500; Referee: Zsolt Szabó; Assistant referees: B. Gaál, Hegyi

15 October 2005 8	MTK	7–0	Pápa	Budapest
18:00 CEST (UTC+2)	Kanta 4', 59' (pen.); Mutică 17' (o.g.); B. Balogh 22'; Lambulić 56'; Bori 73'; Czvitkovics 88'	Report	A. Farkas (yellow card) 58'	Stadium: Hidegkuti Nándor Stadion; Attendance: 1,000; Referee: Attila Hanacsek; Assistant referees: P. Kovács, I. Tóth

23 October 2005 9	Zalaegerszeg	3–4	MTK	Zalaegerszeg
11:30 CEST (UTC+2)	Kocsárdi (yellow card) 5'; László 33'; V. Sebők (yellow card) 49', (goal) 90+3' (pen.); Montvai (yellow card) 50'; Sabo 64'	Report	Pollák (yellow card) 1'; Hrepka 5', 66'; Czvitkovics 38'; Rodenbücher (yellow card) 75'; Bori 84'	Stadium: ZTE Arena; Attendance: 4,000; Referee: Viktor Kassai; Assistant referees: G. Erős, Z. Tompos

29 October 2005 10	MTK	2–1	Kaposvár	Budapest
18:00 CEST (UTC+2)	Zabos (yellow card) 45'; Illés 55'; Petrók 90' (o.g.)	Report	Szakály 14'; Kovácsevics (yellow card) 62'; Zsolnai (yellow card) 73'; Tereánszki-Tóth (yellow card) 90+1'	Stadium: Hidegkuti Nándor Stadion; Attendance: 800; Referee: Attila Dubraviczky; Assistant referees: I. A. Nagy, Hegyi

5 November 2005 11	Fehérvár	1–0	MTK	Székesfehérvár
18:00 CET (UTC+1)	Csizmadia (yellow card) 31', (goal) 74' (pen.); Schwarcz (yellow card) 89'	Report	Jezdimirović (yellow card) 47'	Stadium: Sóstói Stadion; Attendance: 6,000; Referee: Szabolcs Saskőy; Assistant referees: Székely, Heibl

19 November 2005 12	Győr	1–3	MTK	Győr
17:00 CET (UTC+1)	Perić (yellow card) 25'; O. Vincze 59' (pen.)	Report	Kanta 14' (pen.), 33'; B. Balogh 26'; Zsidai (yellow card) 56'	Stadium: Stadion ETO; Attendance: 800; Referee: Péter Solymosi; Assistant referees: G. Takács, Z. Kovács

26 November 2005 13	MTK	0–2	Újpest	Budapest
17:00 CET (UTC+1)	Jezdimirović (yellow card) 7'; Pollák (yellow card) 75'	Report	Rajczi 20', 52'; Vanczák (yellow card) 28'	Stadium: Hidegkuti Nándor Stadion; Attendance: 4,000; Referee: Csaba Imre Sápi; Assistant referees: Tibor Vígh, Lajos L. Tóth

29 November 2005 7	Honvéd	2–2	MTK	Budapest
18:00 CET (UTC+1)	Genito (yellow card) 15'; Z. Kovács II (yellow card) 17' (yellow-red card) 83'; Venczel (yellow card) 29'; Udvari (yellow card) 51'; Z. Takács (yellow card) 64'; Miró 67'; Alves 81'; Dobos (yellow card) 90'; Schultz (red card) 90+6'; Borgulya (red card) (after the match)	Report	Kanta 32' (pen.); Lambulić (yellow card) 44', (goal) 90+8'	Stadium: Bozsik József Stadion; Attendance: 1,500; Referee: Szabolcs Saskőy; Assistant referees: Székely, Heibl

3 December 2005 14	Diósgyőr	0–0	MTK	Miskolc
15:00 CET (UTC+1)	Tisza (yellow card) 31'; V. Farkas (yellow card) 42'	Report		Stadium: Diósgyőri Stadion; Attendance: 7,000; Referee: Attila Dubraviczky; Assistant referees: I. A. Nagy, I. Tóth

10 December 2005 15	MTK	3–0	Vasas	Budapest
15:00 CET (UTC+1)	Hrepka 25', 45'; B. Balogh 37'	Report	Majoros (yellow card) 35'	Stadium: Hidegkuti Nándor Stadion; Attendance: 700; Referee: János Makai; Assistant referees: Kispál, I. Mészáros

25 February 2006 16	MTK	1–0	Rákospalota	Budapest
16:00 CET (UTC+1)	K. Németh II 65'	Report	G. Nagy I (yellow card) 59'	Stadium: Hidegkuti Nándor Stadion; Attendance: 600; Referee: Ferenc Bede; Assistant referees: Z. Tompos, T. Vámos

4 March 2006 17	Pécs	2–2	MTK	Pécs
16:00 CET (UTC+1)	Szekeres 20'; Szabados (yellow card) 30'; Balaskó 70' (pen.), (yellow card) 72'	Report	Bonifert 7'; B. Balogh 36'; Hrepka (yellow card) 86'	Stadium: Stadion PMFC; Attendance: 2,000; Referee: Sándor Gergely; Assistant referees: L. Varga II, G. Takács

12 March 2006 18	MTK	2–4	Debrecen	Budapest
14:30 CET (UTC+1)	Bori (yellow card) 27'; Hrepka 30'; Koljenović (yellow card) 37'; Czvitkovics 65'	Report	Sidibe 26', 67'; Bogdanović 40'; Nikolov (yellow card) 69'; Éger 78'; Tomić (yellow card) 81'; Ferenczi (yellow card) 90+3'	Stadium: Hidegkuti Nándor Stadion; Attendance: 0 Referee: Zsolt Szabó; Assistant referees: Hegyi, Szpisják
Note: Budapest Metropolitan Police ordered a closed-door match due to security deficiencies at the stadium.

18 March 2006 19	Tatabánya	0–1	MTK	Tatabánya
15:00 CET (UTC+1)		Report	B. Balogh (yellow card) 10'; Hrepka 70'	Stadium: Városi Stadion; Attendance: 3,000; Referee: János Makai; Assistant referees: Kispál, Székely

25 March 2006 20	MTK	2–0	Sopron	Budapest
17:00 CET (UTC+1)	Zabos 19' (pen.), 82'; Lambulić (yellow card) 90+2'	Report	Munteanu (yellow card) 45'; László (yellow card) 81'	Stadium: Hidegkuti Nándor Stadion; Attendance: 1,000; Referee: Mihály Fábián; Assistant referees: G. Ortó, T. Márkus

2 April 2006 21	Ferencváros	1–0	MTK	Budapest
11:30 CEST (UTC+2)	Bognár (yellow card) 39'; Botiș (yellow card) 69'; Lipcsei 80' (pen.)	Report	Kanta (yellow card) 56'; L. Horváth (yellow card) 90+1'	Stadium: Üllői úti Stadion; Attendance: 4,779; Referee: Viktor Kassai; Assistant referees: G. Erős, Z. Szalai

7 April 2006 22	MTK	0–0	Honvéd	Budapest
19:00 CEST (UTC+2)	Lambulić (yellow card) 33'; Pollák (yellow card) 51'	Report	Pomper (yellow card) 27'; Z. Kovács II (yellow card) 49'; Mbengono (yellow card) 88'	Stadium: Hidegkuti Nándor Stadion; Attendance: 1,500; Referee: István Vad; Assistant referees: P. Tóth, I. A. Nagy

15 April 2006 23	Pápa	1–3	MTK	Pápa
18:00 CEST (UTC+2)	D’Arrigo (yellow card) 74', (red card) (after the match); L. Gaál (yellow card) 83'; Élder 90'	Report	Czvitkovics 6'; Lambulić 22'; Lipcsei (yellow card) 64'; B. Balogh (yellow card) 75'; Hrepka 90'	Stadium: Perutz Stadion; Attendance: 1,700; Referee: Tamás Arany; Assistant referees: P. Szabó, B. Gaál

22 April 2006 24	MTK	6–3	Zalaegerszeg	Budapest
18:00 CEST (UTC+2)	Kanta 2' (pen.), 16' (pen.), 37'; Végh (yellow card) 22'; Czvitkovics 24', 33'; L. Horváth 30', (yellow card) 90+1'; Selei (yellow card) 65'	Report	Simonfalvi (yellow card) 16'; V. Sebők 22' (pen.), (yellow card) 81'; Kónya (yellow card) 36'; Lambulić 55' (o.g.); Kottán 83'	Stadium: Hidegkuti Nándor Stadion; Attendance: 1,000; Referee: Mihály Fábián; Assistant referees: Z. Szalai, Heibl

29 April 2006 25	Kaposvár	1–3	MTK	Kaposvár
18:00 CEST (UTC+2)	Oláh 31'; Kriston (yellow card) 67'	Report	Czvitkovics 36'; Kanta 45'; Hrepka 76'; Rodenbücher (yellow card) 88'	Stadium: Rákóczi Stadion; Attendance: 2,200; Referee: Sándor Gergely; Assistant referees: I. A. Nagy, Tompos

6 May 2006 26	MTK	0–1	Fehérvár	Budapest
19:00 CEST (UTC+2)	Lambulić (yellow card) 42'; Zsidai (yellow card) 77'; L. Horváth (yellow card) 81'	Report	Lattenstein (yellow card) 53'; Csizmadia (yellow card) 75'; F. Horváth 86'	Stadium: Hidegkuti Nándor Stadion; Attendance: 1,000; Referee: Péter Solymosi; Assistant referees: I. A. Nagy, G. Ortó

13 May 2006 27	MTK	5–2	Győr	Budapest
19:00 CEST (UTC+2)	Kanta 4', 15', 49'; Regedei 60' (o.g.); K. Németh II 90+2'	Report	Zsók (yellow card) 41'; O. Vincze (yellow card) 51'; Bajzát 62'; Granát 67'	Stadium: Hidegkuti Nándor Stadion; Attendance: 500; Referee: József Erdős; Assistant referees: T. Vígh, T. Márkus

20 May 2006 28	Újpest	1–2	MTK	Budapest
15:00 CEST (UTC+2)	Rajczi 36', (yellow card) 39'; Vanczák (yellow card) 76' (yellow-red card) 89'; Hullám (red card) 88'	Report	B. Balogh (yellow card) 19'; L. Horváth (yellow card) 69'; Jezdimirović (yellow card) 75'; Kanta 88', (yellow card) 88'; Lambulić 90'	Stadium: Szusza Ferenc Stadion; Attendance: 7,855; Referee: Ferenc Bede; Assistant referees: I. A. Nagy, P. Tóth

27 May 2006 29	MTK	4–0	Diósgyőr	Budapest
19:00 CEST (UTC+2)	Czvitkovics 31'; Kanta 34', 53'; Jezdimirović (yellow card) 49'; Illés 90'	Report	Vitelki (yellow card) 39'	Stadium: Hidegkuti Nándor Stadion; Attendance: 1,000; Referee: Sándor Gergely; Assistant referees: Szalai, T. Márkus

3 June 2006 30	Vasas	2–1	MTK	Budapest
16:20 CEST (UTC+2)	Bárányos (yellow card) 29'; Z. Molnár (yellow card) 35', (goal) 74'; G. Hegedűs (yellow card) 38'; Zs. Balog 58'	Report	Hrepka 15'; Rodenbücher (yellow card) 63'	Stadium: Illovszky Rudolf Stadion; Attendance: 700; Referee: Csaba Imre Sápi; Assistant referees: T. Vígh, Schuszter

=== Magyar Kupa ===
10 September 2005 Second round	Cegléd	0–3	MTK	Cegléd
16:00 CEST (UTC+2)		Report	Czvitkovics 2x; Selei	Stadium: Malomtó széli stadion Attendance: 1,500; Referee: József Erdős; Assistant referees: Kispál, T. Vígh

21 September 2005 Third round	Jászapáti	1–3 (a.e.t.)	MTK	Jászapáti
15:30 CEST (UTC+2)	Dani (yellow card); Vígh 76'	Report	Hrepka (yellow card); Kanta 58'; Urbán 105'; Selei 118'	Stadium: Városi Stadion; Attendance: 1,800; Referee: Csaba Imre Sápi; Assistant referees: Á. Telek, I. Tóth

==== Round of 16 ====
26 October 2005 First leg	Fehérvár	1–1	MTK	Székesfehérvár
18:00 CEST (UTC+2)	Sitku 3'	Report	Jezdimirović (yellow card) 52'; Pollák (yellow card) 54'; Hrepka 64', (yellow card) 72'	Stadium: Sóstói Stadion; Attendance: 4,000; Referee: Zoltán Szarka; Assistant referees: P. Szabó, Z. Kovács

6 December 2005 Second leg	MTK	1–2 (2–3 agg.)	Fehérvár	Budapest
17:00 CET (UTC+1)	B. Balogh (yellow card) 83', (goal) 90+2' (pen.); Zabos (yellow card) 85'	Report	Kuttor 12'; Sitku 29'; Bartyik (yellow card) 88'	Stadium: Hidegkuti Nándor Stadion; Attendance: 500; Referee: Mihály Fábián; Assistant referees: Ortó, T. Márkus
Note: Fehérvár won 3–2 on aggregate.
