= 2006–07 MTK Budapest FC season =

MTK
2006–07 season
- Manager: József Garami
- Stadium: Hidegkuti Nándor Stadion
- Nemzeti Bajnokság I: 2nd
- Magyar Kupa: Quarter-finals
- Top goalscorer: League: József Kanta (16); All: József Kanta (24)
- Highest home attendance: 2,400 v Debrecen (14 October 2006, Nemzeti Bajnokság I)
- Lowest home attendance: 800 v Győr (29 November 2006, Magyar Kupa)
- Average home league attendance: 1,487
- Biggest win: 8–0 v Törökszentmiklós (Away, 20 September 2006, Magyar Kupa)
- Biggest defeat: 0–3 v Debrecen (Away, 14 April 2007, Nemzeti Bajnokság I)

The 2006–07 season was Magyar Testgyakorlók Köre Budapest Futball Club's 98th competitive season, 12th consecutive season in the Nemzeti Bajnokság I and 102nd season in existence as a football club. In addition to the domestic league, MTK participated in that season's editions of the Magyar Kupa.

== Squad ==
Squad at end of season

Note: Flags indicate national team as defined under FIFA eligibility rules; some limited exceptions apply. Players may hold more than one non-FIFA nationality.

No.	Pos.	Nation	Player
1	GK	HUN	Zoltán Végh
3	DF	HUN	Attila Kriston
5	DF	HUN	Béla Balogh
7	MF	HUN	Péter Czvitkovics
9	FW	HUN	András Pál
11	MF	HUN	András Selei
13	FW	HUN	Ádám Hrepka
15	DF	HUN	Levente Horváth
16	DF	HUN	Ádám Pintér
17	MF	HUN	László Zsidai

No.	Pos.	Nation	Player
18	FW	HUN	Krisztián Németh
19	MF	HUN	József Kanta
20	DF	MNE	Mladen Lambulić
21	MF	HUN	Gábor Bori
22	DF	HUN	István Rodenbücher
24	DF	HUN	Zoltán Pollák
27	MF	HUN	Péter Bonifert
28	FW	HUN	Gábor Urbán
29	GK	HUN	Zoltán Szatmári
30	MF	HUN	Roland Lipcsei

== Competitions ==
=== Overview ===
Competition	First match	Last match	Starting round	Final position	Record							
Competition	First match	Last match	Starting round	Final position	Pld	W	D	L	GF	GA	GD	Win %
Nemzeti Bajnokság I	29 July 2006	28 May 2007	Matchday 1	2nd	30	19	4	7	61	33	+28	63.33
Magyar Kupa	20 September 2006	11 April 2007	Third round	Quarter-finals	6	4	1	1	25	5	+20	66.67
Total					36	23	5	8	86	38	+48	63.89

Source: Competitions

=== Nemzeti Bajnokság I ===
==== League table ====
Pos	Team	Pld	W	D	L	GF	GA	GD	Pts	Qualification or relegation
1	Debrecen (C)	30	22	3	5	63	21	+42	69	Qualification for the Champions League second qualifying round
2	MTK	30	19	4	7	61	33	+28	61	Qualification for the UEFA Cup first qualifying round
3	Zalaegerszeg	30	17	4	9	54	38	+16	55	Qualification for the Intertoto Cup second round
4	Újpest	30	15	4	11	39	32	+7	46 (Note: Újpest were deducted three points due to federation decision.)	
5	Vasas	30	13	6	11	43	41	+2	45	

Source: soccerway.com
(C) Champions

==== Results summary ====
Overall								Home						Away					
Pld	W	D	L	GF	GA	GD	Pts	W	D	L	GF	GA	GD	W	D	L	GF	GA	GD
30	19	4	7	61	33	+28	61	11	3	1	32	8	+24	8	1	6	29	25	+4

Source: Hungarian Football Federation

==== Results by round ====
Round	1	2	3	4	5	6	7	8	9	10	11	12	13	14	15	16	17	18	19	20	21	22	23	24	25	26	27	28	29	30
Ground	H	A	H	A	H	A	H	A	H	A	H	H	A	H	A	A	H	A	H	A	H	A	H	A	H	A	A	H	A	H
Result	W	L	W	W	W	W	W	W	W	W	L	D	W	W	W	D	W	W	D	L	D	L	W	L	W	L	L	W	W	W
Position	1	7	4	3	3	3	2	2	2	1	2	1	1	1	1	1	1	1	1	2	1	2	2	2	2	2	2	2	2	2
Points	3	3	6	9	12	15	18	21	24	27	27	28	31	34	37	38	41	44	45	45	46	46	49	49	52	52	52	55	58	61

Source: Matches
A = Away; H = Home; W = Win; D = Draw; L = Loss

==== Matches ====
29 July 2006 1	MTK	4–0	Rákospalota	Budapest
20:00 CEST (UTC+2)	Hrepka 9', 41', 70'; Rodenbücher 60'; Kanta (yellow card) 62'	Report	G. Horváth I (yellow card) 50'; Pusztai (yellow card) 58'; Polonkai (yellow card) 79'	Stadium: Hidegkuti Nándor Stadion; Attendance: 1,000; Referee: Zsolt Szabó; Assistant referees: Dr. Péter Hegyi, Róbert Kispál; Fourth official: Balázs Világi

4 August 2006 2	Zalaegerszeg	1–0	MTK	Zalaegerszeg
19:00 CEST (UTC+2)	Ljubojević 5'; Z. Varga I (yellow card) 90+2'	Report	Pál (yellow card) 14'; L. Horváth (yellow card) 46'; Bori (yellow card) 82'	Stadium: ZTE Arena; Attendance: 5,000; Referee: Attila Hanacsek; Assistant referees: Imre Attila Nagy, Dr. Péter Kovács; Fourth official: Attila Lidi

19 August 2006 3	MTK	4–1	Sopron	Budapest
19:00 CEST (UTC+2)	Lambulić (yellow card) 20'; Hrepka 27', 31'; Kanta 47'; K. Németh 88'	Report	Radu 8'; Ibric (yellow card) 49'; A. Horváth (yellow card) 85'	Stadium: Hidegkuti Nándor Stadion; Attendance: 2,000; Referee: Sándor Andó-Szabó; Assistant referees: Zsolt Szpisják, Jénos Medovarszki; Fourth official: Attila Hegedűs

26 August 2006 4	Pécs	0–1	MTK	Pécs
17:00 CEST (UTC+2)	Balaskó (yellow card) 29'	Report	Czvitkovics 58'; Zsidai (yellow card) 83'	Stadium: Stadion PMFC; Attendance: 2,000; Referee: Tamás Bognár; Assistant referees: Dr. Péter Szabó, Zoltán Kovács; Fourth official: Norbert Ferencz

10 September 2006 5	MTK	1–0	Paks	Budapest
19:00 CEST (UTC+2)	Hrepka (yellow card) 23'; Pollák (yellow card) 59'; Urbán 78'	Report	Barics (yellow card) 37'; S. Horváth (red card) 90+4'	Stadium: Hidegkuti Nándor Stadion; Attendance: 1,000; Referee: Mihály Fábián; Assistant referees: Attila Kelemen, Dr. Zsolt Varga; Fourth official: László Varga

16 September 2006 6	Vasas	1–5	MTK	Budapest
15:00 CEST (UTC+2)	Skita 63'	Report	Kanta 4', (yellow card) 33'; Hrepka 28'; Rodenbücher (yellow card) 30'; K. Németh 65', 84', 87'; L. Horváth (yellow card) 70'	Stadium: Illovszky Rudolf Stadion; Attendance: 1,500; Referee: Viktor Kassai; Assistant referees: Gábor Erős, Tibor Vámos; Fourth official: Balázs Világi

23 September 2006 7	MTK	2–0	Kaposvár	Budapest
19:00 CEST (UTC+2)	Kanta 42'; Bori 50'; L. Horváth (yellow card) 90'	Report	Suljić (yellow card) 44'; Petrók (yellow card) 60'; Z. Varga II (yellow card) 69'	Stadium: Hidegkuti Nándor Stadion; Attendance: 1,500; Referee: István Vad; Assistant referees: Tamás Márkus, Gyula Ortó; Fourth official: József Berger

30 September 2006 8	Dunakanyar-Vác	2–3	MTK	Vác
18:00 CEST (UTC+2)	Rob 11'; P. Kovács (yellow card) 57'; Gáspár (yellow card) 62'; Palásthy 80'	Report	Lipcsei (yellow card) 22'; Kanta 27'; Bori 58'; Rodenbücher 73'; Á. Pintér (yellow card) 90+1'	Stadium: Ligeti Stadion; Attendance: 2,000; Referee: Károly Török; Assistant referees: Dr. Péter Kovács, Balázs Világi; Fourth official: Attila Lidi

14 October 2006 9	MTK	1–0	Debrecen	Budapest
15:00 CEST (UTC+2)	Kanta 68' (pen.)	Report	Szatmári (yellow card) 10'; Dzsudzsák (yellow card) 54'; Brnović (yellow card) 77'	Stadium: Hidegkuti Nándor Stadion; Attendance: 2,400; Referee: Péter Solymosi; Assistant referees: Ferenc Székely, Gábor Takács; Fourth official: Bence Gaál

21 October 2006 10	Tatabánya	2–4	MTK	Tatabánya
14:30 CEST (UTC+2)	Kouemaha 32', (yellow card) 35'; Poleksić (yellow card) 36'; Bakrač (yellow card) 45'; Ndjodo 48'; Mile (yellow card) 59'	Report	Kriston (yellow card) 20'; Kanta 37', 47', (yellow card) 41'; Hrepka 60'; K. Németh 62'; Rodenbücher (yellow card) 66'	Stadium: Városi Stadion; Attendance: 2,000; Referee: Ferenc Bede; Assistant referees: Zoltán Tompos, Tibor Vámos; Fourth official: Gábor Oláh

27 October 2006 11	MTK	0–1	Fehérvár	Budapest
19:00 CEST (UTC+2)	Pál (yellow card) 89'	Report	Mohl (yellow card) 9'; Kocsis (yellow card) 50'; Dvéri 56'; Farkas (yellow card) 65'; Terjék (yellow card) 79'	Stadium: Hidegkuti Nándor Stadion; Attendance: 2,000; Referee: Sándor Andó-Szabó; Assistant referees: Zsolt Szpisják, Tibor Vígh; Fourth official: András Sóthy

4 November 2006 12	MTK	2–2	Honvéd	Budapest
17:00 CET (UTC+1)	Kanta 54', 74'	Report	Dancs (yellow card) 19'; László 21'; Hercegfalvi 58'; Angoua (yellow card) 85'	Stadium: Hidegkuti Nándor Stadion; Attendance: 1,000; Referee: Szabolcs Szilasi; Assistant referees: Ferenc Székely, Zoltán Kis; Fourth official: László Varga

11 November 2006 13	Diósgyőr	0–1	MTK	Miskolc
17:00 CET (UTC+1)	Abdou (yellow card) 40'	Report	Rodenbücher (yellow card) 25'; Pollák (yellow card) 32'; Kriston (yellow card) 55'; Hrepka 68'	Stadium: Diósgyőri Stadion; Attendance: 5,000; Referee: István Vad; Assistant referees: Attila Kelemen, Gyula Fehér; Fourth official: János Takács

20 November 2006 14	MTK	1–0	Győr	Budapest
18:00 CET (UTC+1)	B. Balogh 68'; Pollák (yellow card) 84'	Report	Z. Kovács II (yellow card) 38'; Dudás (yellow card) 84'; Z. Szabó (yellow card) 90+1'	Stadium: Hidegkuti Nándor Stadion; Attendance: 1,000; Referee: Péter Solymosi; Assistant referees: Jozsef Heibl, István Tóth; Fourth official: Gábor Oláh

24 November 2006 15	Újpest	2–3	MTK	Budapest
19:00 CET (UTC+1)	Tisza 23', 73'; Gulyás (yellow card) 80'	Report	K. Németh 33'; Hrepka 41', 63', (yellow card) 50'; Bori (yellow card) 69'	Stadium: Szusza Ferenc Stadion; Attendance: 2,500; Referee: Viktor Kassai; Assistant referees: Gábor Erős, Tibor Vámos; Fourth official: Károly Török

2 December 2006 16	Rákospalota	0–0	MTK	Budapest
13:30 CET (UTC+1)	Kapcsos (yellow card) 59'; Török (yellow card) 82'	Report	Kanta (yellow card) 52'; Czvitkovics (yellow card) 90+1'	Stadium: Budai II. László Stadion; Attendance: 700; Referee: Tamás Arany; Assistant referees: Dr. Zsolt Varga, Gyula Ortó; Fourth official: Ákos Telek

8 December 2006 17	MTK	2–0	Zalaegerszeg	Budapest
19:00 CET (UTC+1)	Czvitkovics 49'; Pál 88'	Report	B. Molnár (yellow card) 45'; V. Sebők (yellow card) 50'; Botiș (yellow card) 74'	Stadium: Hidegkuti Nándor Stadion; Attendance: 900; Referee: Zsolt Szabó; Assistant referees: Dr. Péter Hegyi, Zoltán Tompos; Fourth official: András Sóthy

24 February 2007 18	Sopron	0–3	MTK	Sopron
15:00 CET (UTC+1)	Cigan (yellow card) 33'; A. Horváth (yellow card) 39'; Magasföldi (yellow card) 61'; Demjén (yellow card) 68'; Munteanu (yellow card) 81'	Report	Hrepka 27'; K. Németh 38', 59'; Pál (yellow card) 45'	Stadium: Káposztás utcai Stadion; Attendance: 1,500; Referee: Viktor Kassai; Assistant referees: Gábor Erős, Tibor Vámos; Fourth official: József Erdős

2 March 2007 19	MTK	0–0	Pécs	Budapest
19:00 CET (UTC+1)	Zsidai (yellow card) 65'	Report	Szatmári (yellow card) 4'; Lantos (yellow card) 85'; Pavičević (yellow card) 90'	Stadium: Hidegkuti Nándor Stadion; Attendance: 2,000; Referee: Péter Solymosi; Assistant referees: Dr. Péter Kovács, Gábor Takács; Fourth official: Péter Herbály

10 March 2007 20	Paks	3–1	MTK	Paks
14:30 CET (UTC+1)	Lambulić 1' (o.g.); Kiss 30'; Tamási (yellow card) 58'; Molnár (yellow card) 67'; Belényesi 74'	Report	K. Németh (yellow card) 38'; Kanta (yellow card) 60', (goal) 61'; Kriston (red card) 65'; Végh (yellow card) 74'	Stadium: Fehérvári úti Stadion; Attendance: 2,000; Referee: Tamás Bognár; Assistant referees: Balázs Huszár, Dr. Péter Szabó; Fourth official: Csaba Pintér

19 March 2007 21	MTK	2–2	Vasas	Budapest
18:00 CET (UTC+1)	Kanta 39'; Bori 53'; Pollák (yellow card) 62'; B. Balogh (yellow card) 89'; K. Németh (yellow card) 90+1'	Report	Kovács 58'; Z. Pintér (yellow card) 75'; Bali 85'	Stadium: Hidegkuti Nándor Stadion; Attendance: 1,500; Referee: Mihály Fábián; Assistant referees: György Ring, Tamás Márkus; Fourth official: Róbert Nagy

31 March 2007 22	Kaposvár	1–0	MTK	Kaposvár
16:00 CEST (UTC+2)	Alves 43'; Kovácsevics (yellow card) 67'; Mező (red card) 75'; Maróti (yellow card) 90+1'	Report	Á. Pintér (yellow card) 62'; L. Horváth (yellow card) 83'; Urbán (yellow card) 88'	Stadium: Rákóczi Stadion; Attendance: 2,500; Referee: Sándor Gergely; Assistant referees: Zoltán Kis, László Viszokai; Fourth official: András Sóthy

8 April 2007 23	MTK	3–0	Dunakanyar-Vác	Budapest
15:00 CEST (UTC+2)	Pál 1'; Kanta 52', 58'	Report	Dudás (yellow card) 34'; Farkas (yellow card) 37'; R. Balogh (red card) 57'; Đokić (yellow card) 58'; Prado (yellow card) 73'	Stadium: Hidegkuti Nándor Stadion; Attendance: 1,500; Referee: Zoltán Iványi; Assistant referees: Zsolt Szpisják, István Albert; Fourth official: Péter Herbály

14 April 2007 24	Debrecen	3–0	MTK	Debrecen
15:00 CEST (UTC+2)	Komlósi 41'; Stojkov 50'; Sidibe 65'	Report	Á. Pintér (yellow card) 37'; Á. Szabó (yellow card) 47'; Lipcsei (yellow card) 58'; Pál (yellow card) 90+2'	Stadium: Oláh Gábor utcai Stadion; Attendance: 10,500; Referee: Péter Solymosi; Assistant referees: Imre Attila Nagy, István Tóth; Fourth official: Gábor Bendik

21 April 2007 25	MTK	4–0	Tatabánya	Budapest
15:00 CEST (UTC+2)	Pál 4'; K. Németh 35', 77'; Pollák (red card) 68'; Rodenbücher 73'	Report	Nečas (yellow card) 12'	Stadium: Hidegkuti Nándor Stadion; Attendance: 2,000; Referee: Mihály Fábián; Assistant referees: Jozsef Heibl, Attila Forgács; Fourth official: Róbert Nagy

29 April 2007 26	Fehérvár	5–3	MTK	Székesfehérvár
16:00 CEST (UTC+2)	Dajić 19', 48'; Julinho 33' (pen.), 58' (pen.), (yellow card) 64'; Mohl (yellow card) 53'; D. Nagy 77'	Report	L. Horváth (yellow card) 14'; Kanta 25'; B. Balogh (yellow card) 33'; K. Németh 38'; Lambulić 54', (yellow card) 58'; Kriston (yellow card) 64'	Stadium: Sóstói Stadion; Attendance: 1,580; Referee: Szabolcs Szilasi; Assistant referees: Dr. Péter Kovács, Tamás Raff; Fourth official: Gábor Oláh

5 May 2007 27	Honvéd	2–1	MTK	Budapest
15:00 CEST (UTC+2)	Dobos 44'; Schindler (yellow card) 73'; Guié 82'	Report	K. Németh (yellow card) 12', (goal) 31'; Á. Szabó (yellow card) 23'; Pollák (yellow card) 72'	Stadium: Bozsik József Stadion; Attendance: 2,500; Referee: István Vad; Assistant referees: Vencel Tóth II, Zsolt Butkai; Fourth official: József Erdős

8 May 2007 28	MTK	4–2	Diósgyőr	Budapest
18:00 CEST (UTC+2)	Czvitkovics (yellow card) 33'; Á. Pintér 36'; L. Horváth 55', (yellow card) 89'; Lambulić 72'; Á. Szabó (yellow card) 81', (goal) 83'	Report	Hegedűs (yellow card) 11'; A. Simon 52'; Binder 89'	Stadium: Hidegkuti Nándor Stadion; Attendance: 1,000; Referee: Viktor Kassai; Assistant referees: Gábor Erős, Tibor Vámos; Fourth official: Ádám Németh

22 May 2007 29	Győr	3–4	MTK	Győr
18:00 CEST (UTC+2)	Bajzát 19', (yellow card) 43'; Jäkl (yellow card) 35'; Mátyus (yellow card) 39'; Böőr 46', (yellow card) 46'; Z. Szabó 74'	Report	Á. Pintér (yellow card) 28'; Kanta 38'; Pátkai 53'; Urbán 76'; Pál 90+2'	Stadium: ETO Park; Attendance: 3,500; Referee: Péter Solmyosi; Assistant referees: Zoltán Kovács, Oszkár Lémon; Fourth official: Norbert Kiss

28 May 2007 30	MTK	2–0	Újpest	Budapest
18:00 CEST (UTC+2)	L. Horváth 5', (yellow card) 90+1' (yellow-red card) 90+3'; Kanta 65'	Report	Erős (yellow card) 90+1' (yellow-red card) 90+3'	Stadium: Hidegkuti Nándor Stadion; Attendance: 1,500; Referee: István Mészáros; Assistant referees: Zoltán Szalai, Tibor Vígh; Fourth official: Gábor Oláh

=== Magyar Kupa ===
20 September 2006 Third round	Törökszentmiklós	0–8	MTK	Törökszentmiklós
15:30 CEST (UTC+2)		Report	Kanta 2x; K. Németh 2x; Zsidai; Pál; Bori; Bonifert	Stadium: Városi Sporttelep; Attendance: 1,000; Referee: Attila Hegedűs; Assistant referees: Albert, Pataki

18 October 2006 Round of 32	Makó	0–6	MTK	Makó
13:30 CEST (UTC+2)	Mórocz (yellow card) 38'	Report	Hrepka 2X; Czvitkovics; Kanta; Bori; k. Németh	Stadium: Erdei Ferenc téri Sporttelep; Attendance: 1,000; Referee: Oláh; Assistant referees: V. Tóth, G. Ring

==== Round of 16 ====
8 November 2006 First leg	Győr	1–3	MTK	Győr (Note: The match was played at the Nádorvárosi Stadion in Győr, instead of Győr regular stadium, the Stadion ETO in Győr, which was demolished to make way to the newly built ETO Park.)
13:30 CET (UTC+1)	P. Tóth (yellow card) 36'; Tokody 80'	Report	Kanta 57', 59', 63'	Stadium: Nádorvárosi Stadion; Attendance: 2,200; Referee: Zoltán Iványi; Assistant referees: Á. Vári, János Medovarszki

29 November 2006 Second leg	MTK	5–0 (8–1 agg.)	Győr	Budapest
17:00 CET (UTC+1)	Kanta 12'; Czvitkovics 35', 83'; Pál 66', 85'	Report	Jäkl (yellow card) 24' (yellow-red card) 50'	Stadium: Hidegkuti Nándor Stadion; Attendance: 800; Referee: Krisztián Pánczél; Assistant referees: István Tóth, Balázs Farkas
Note: MTK won 8–1 on aggregate.

==== Quarter-finals ====
13 March 2007 First leg	MTK	2–2	Honvéd	Budapest
18:00 CET (UTC+1)	Kanta 3'; Pollák (yellow card) 28'; Bori (yellow card) 29', (goal) 44'; Kriston (yellow card) 76'	Report	Bogdanović 7'; Dobos (yellow card) 24'; Genito (yellow card) 42'; Ndjodo 49'; Ivancsics (yellow card) 78'; Pomper (yellow card) 84'	Stadium: Hidegkuti Nándor Stadion; Attendance: 2,000; Referee: Sándor Andó-Szabó; Assistant referees: Zoltán Tompos, Dr. Ádám Vári

11 April 2007 Second leg	Honvéd	2–1 (4–3 agg.)	MTK	Budapest
18:00 CEST (UTC+2)	Dobos (yellow card) 44', (goal) 90'; Smiljanić 62'; T. Szabó (yellow card) 82'	Report	Pollák 5'; Hrepka (yellow card) 54'; L. Horváth (yellow card) 57'; Czvitkovics (yellow card) 67'	Stadium: Bozsik József Stadion; Attendance: 4,000; Referee: Ferenc Bede; Assistant referees: Tibor Vígh, Balázs Farkas; Fourth official: Csaba Pintér
Note: Honvéd won 4–3 on aggregate.

== Statistics ==
=== Overall ===
Appearances (Apps) numbers are for appearances in competitive games only, including sub appearances.
Source: Competitions

No.	Player	Pos.	Nemzeti Bajnokság I				Magyar Kupa				Total			
No.	Player	Pos.	Apps	Goal	Yellow card	Red card	Apps	Goal	Yellow card	Red card	Apps	Goal	Yellow card	Red card
1	(Hungary) Zoltán Végh	GK	30		1		6				36		1	
2	(Hungary) Máté Pátkai	MF	3	1			2				5	1		
3	(Hungary) Attila Kriston	DF	13		3	1	6		1		19		4	1
4	(Hungary) Imre Tóth	DF												
5	(Hungary) Béla Balogh	DF	24	1	2		4				28	1	2	
6	(Hungary) Ádám Szabó	MF	6	1	3						6	1	3	
7	(Hungary) Péter Czvitkovics	MF	29	2	2		5	3	1		34	5	3	
8	(Hungary) Dániel Vadnai	DF	2								2			
8	(Hungary) Attila Zabos	MF	4								4			
9	(Hungary) András Pál	FW	25	4	4		5	3			30	7	4	
11	(Hungary) András Selei	MF	2				1				3			
12	(Hungary) László Lencse	FW												
13	(Hungary) Ádám Hrepka	FW	27	11	2		5	2	1		32	13	3	
14	(Hungary) Attila Busai	MF	1								1			
15	(Hungary) Levente Horváth	DF	19	2	7	1	2		1		21	2	8	1
16	(Hungary) Ádám Pintér	DF	20	1	4		4				24	1	4	
17	(Hungary) László Zsidai	MF	17		2		4	1			21	1	2	
18	(Hungary) Krisztián Németh	FW	25	12	3		4	3			29	15	3	
19	(Hungary) József Kanta	MF	27	16	5		6	8			33	24	5	
20	(Montenegro) Mladen Lambulić	DF	30	2	2		6				36	2	2	
21	(Hungary) Gábor Bori	MF	24	3	2		6	3	1		30	6	3	
22	(Hungary) István Rodenbücher	DF	25	3	3		5				30	3	3	
23	(Hungary) András Simon	FW	1								1			
24	(Hungary) Zoltán Pollák	DF	26		5	1	6	1	1		32	1	6	1
25	(Hungary) Attila Simon	FW	2				1				3			
27	(Hungary) Péter Bonifert	MF	4				1	1			5	1		
28	(Hungary) Gábor Urbán	FW	10	2	1		1				11	2	1	
29	(Hungary) Zoltán Szatmári	GK												
30	(Hungary) Roland Lipcsei	MF	9		2		4				13		2	
31	(Hungary) András Vági	DF												
Own goals														
Totals				61	53	3		25	6			86	59	3

=== Hat-tricks ===
No.	Player	Against	Result	Date	Competition
13	(Hungary) Ádám Hrepka	Rákospalota (H)	4–0	29 July 2006	Nemzeti Bajnokság I
18	(Hungary) Krisztián Németh	Vasas (A)	1–5	16 September 2006	Nemzeti Bajnokság I
19	(Hungary) József Kanta	Győr (A)	1–3	29 November 2006	Magyar Kupa

=== Clean sheets ===
			Clean sheets		
No.	Player	Games Played	Nemzeti Bajnokság I	Magyar Kupa	Total
1	(Hungary) Zoltán Végh	36	14	3	17
29	(Hungary) Zoltán Szatmári				
Totals			14	3	17
