= 2007–08 MTK Budapest FC season =

MTK
2007–08 season
- Chairman: Gábor Várszegi
- Manager: József Garami
- Stadium: Hidegkuti Nándor Stadion
- Nemzeti Bajnokság I: 1st
- Magyar Kupa: Round of 32
- Ligakupa: Autumn season: Group stage Spring season: Semi-finals
- UEFA Cup: First qualifying round
| Home colours | Away colours |

The 2007–08 season was Magyar Testgyakorlók Köre Budapest Futball Club's 99th competitive season, 13th consecutive season in the Nemzeti Bajnokság I and 119th year in existence as a football club. In addition to the domestic league, MTK participated in that season's editions of the Magyar Kupa, the Ligakupa and the UEFA Cup.

== Squad ==
Note: Flags indicate national team as defined under FIFA eligibility rules; some limited exceptions apply. Players may hold more than one non-FIFA nationality.

| No. | Pos. | Nation | Player |
|---|---|---|---|
| 1 | GK | HUN | Zoltán Végh |
| 2 | MF | HUN | Máté Pátkai |
| 3 | DF | HUN | Adrián Szekeres |
| 4 | DF | HUN | Dániel Vadnai |
| 6 | MF | HUN | Ádám Szabó |
| 7 | FW | HUN | Tamás Kulcsár |
| 8 | MF | HUN | Tamás Kecskés |
| 9 | FW | HUN | András Pál |
| 11 | MF | HUN | István Ladóczki |
| 12 | FW | HUN | László Lencse |
| 13 | FW | HUN | Ádám Hrepka |
| 15 | DF | HUN | Levente Horváth |

| No. | Pos. | Nation | Player |
|---|---|---|---|
| 16 | DF | HUN | Ádám Pintér |
| 17 | MF | HUN | László Zsidai |
| 18 | DF | HUN | Endre Bajúsz |
| 19 | MF | HUN | József Kanta |
| 20 | DF | SRB | Mladen Lambulić |
| 22 | DF | HUN | István Rodenbücher |
| 24 | DF | HUN | Zoltán Pollák |
| 25 | FW | HUN | Attila Simon |
| 26 | GK | HUN | Péter Gulácsi |
| 28 | FW | HUN | Gábor Urbán |
| 29 | GK | HUN | Zoltán Szatmári |

== Competitions ==
=== Overview ===
| Competition | First match | Last match | Starting round | Final position | Record | | | | | | | |
| Competition | First match | Last match | Starting round | Final position | Pld | W | D | L | GF | GA | GD | Win % |
|---|---|---|---|---|---|---|---|---|---|---|---|---|
| Nemzeti Bajnokság I | 23 July 2007 | 1 June 2008 | Matchday 1 | Winners | 30 | 20 | 6 | 4 | 67 | 23 | +44 | 66.67 |
| Magyar Kupa | 26 September 2007 | 26 September 2007 | Round of 32 | Round of 32 | 1 | 0 | 1 | 0 | 0 | 0 | +0 | 0.00 |
| Ligakupa (Autumn season) | 15 August 2007 | 10 October 2007 | Group stage | Group stage | 6 | 2 | 1 | 3 | 8 | 9 | −1 | 33.33 |
| Ligakupa (Spring season) | 1 December 2007 | 23 April 2008 | Group stage | Semi-finals | 10 | 6 | 3 | 1 | 23 | 9 | +14 | 60.00 |
| UEFA Cup | 19 July 2007 | 2 August 2007 | First qualifying round | First qualifying round | 2 | 1 | 0 | 1 | 2 | 2 | +0 | 50.00 |
| Total | | | | | 49 | 29 | 11 | 9 | 100 | 43 | +57 | 59.18 |

Source: Competitions

=== Nemzeti Bajnokság I ===
==== League table ====
| Pos | Team | Pld | W | D | L | GF | GA | GD | Pts | Qualification or relegation |
|---|---|---|---|---|---|---|---|---|---|---|
| 1 | MTK (C) | 30 | 20 | 6 | 4 | 67 | 23 | +44 | 66 | Qualification for Champions League second qualifying round |
| 2 | Debrecen | 30 | 19 | 7 | 4 | 67 | 29 | +38 | 64 | Qualification for UEFA Cup first qualifying round |
| 3 | Győr | 30 | 16 | 10 | 4 | 64 | 35 | +29 | 58 | Qualification for UEFA Cup first qualifying round |
| 4 | Újpest | 30 | 16 | 7 | 7 | 58 | 40 | +18 | 55 | |
| 5 | Fehérvár | 30 | 17 | 3 | 10 | 48 | 32 | +16 | 54 | |

Source: soccerway.com
(C) Champions

==== Results summary ====
| Overall | | | | | | | | Home | | | | | | Away | | | | | |
| Pld | W | D | L | GF | GA | GD | Pts | W | D | L | GF | GA | GD | W | D | L | GF | GA | GD |
|---|---|---|---|---|---|---|---|---|---|---|---|---|---|---|---|---|---|---|---|
| 30 | 20 | 6 | 4 | 67 | 23 | +44 | 66 | 9 | 4 | 2 | 33 | 14 | +19 | 11 | 2 | 2 | 34 | 9 | +25 |

Source: Hungarian Football Federation

==== Matches ====
| 23 July 2007 1 | MTK | 2–0 | Fehérvár | Budapest |
| | Bori 52'; Urbán 60' | Report | | Stadium: Hidegkuti Nándor Stadion; Referee: Ferenc Bede |

| 28 July 2007 2 | Paks | 1–4 | MTK | Paks |
| | Márkus 2' | Report | Pátkai 9'; Kanta 75'; Zsidai 82'; Hrepka 90+2' | Stadium: Fehérvári úti Stadion; Referee: Csaba Imre Sápi |

| 6 August 2007 3 | MTK | 0–0 | Újpest | Budapest |
| | | Report | | Stadium: Hidegkuti Nándor Stadion; Referee: Viktor Kassai |

| 10 August 2007 4 | Diósgyőr | 2–2 | MTK | Miskolc |
| | Carr 30'; Elek 90+2' | Report | Urbán 45', 55' | Stadium: Diósgyőri Stadion; Referee: Tamás Arany |

| 17 August 2007 5 | MTK | 3–2 | Debrecen | Budapest |
| | Kanta 20'; Urbán 67'; Kulcsár 72' | Report | Rudolf 40'; Kouemaha 45' | Stadium: Hidegkuti Nándor Stadion; Referee: Sándor Andó-Szabó |

| 25 August 2007 6 | Siófok | 1–1 | MTK | Siófok |
| | Fülöp 27' | Report | J. Kanta 68' | Stadium: Révész Géza utcai Stadion; Referee: Csaba Imre Sápi |

| 3 September 2007 7 | MTK | 4–1 | Zalaegerszeg | Budapest |
| | Urbán 22'; Kulcsár (yellow card) 37'; Bori 75', (yellow card) 75'; Kanta 85'; Szabó 90' | Report | Pekič 13'; Vulin (yellow card) 40'; P. Máté I (yellow card) 41' | Stadium: Hidegkuti Nándor Stadion; Referee: Ferenc Bede |

| 17 September 2007 8 | MTK | 2–2 | Győr | Budapest |
| | Lambulić 17'; Szabó 50' | Report | Nikolov 44'; Brnović 82' | Stadium: Hidegkuti Nándor Stadion; Referee: Tamás Bognár |

| 22 September 2007 9 | Kaposvár | 0–3 | MTK | Kaposvár |
| | | Report | Urbán 19'; Kanta 36'; Lambulić 52' | Stadium: Rákóczi Stadion; Referee: Sándor Andó-Szabó |

| 1 October 2007 10 | MTK | 1–2 | Honvéd | Budapest |
| | Bori 24' | Report | Guié 5'; Dieng 65' | Stadium: Hidegkuti Nándor Stadion; Referee: Ferenc Bede |

| 8 October 2007 11 | Vasas | 0–3 | MTK | Budapest |
| | | Report | Kulcsár 9', 41'; Pátkai 62' | Stadium: Illovszky Rudolf Stadion; Referee: Mihály Fábián |

| 22 October 2007 12 | MTK | 2–0 | Nyíregyháza | Budapest |
| | Bori 43'; Szabó 50' | Report | | Stadium: Hidegkuti Nándor Stadion; Referee: Tamás Bognár |

| 3 November 2007 13 | Tatabánya | 1–3 | MTK | Tatabánya |
| | Caugherty 64' | Report | Pátkai 10'; Pintér 80'; Urbán 82' | Stadium: Stadion Városi; Referee: Szabolcs Szilasi |

| 12 November 2007 14 | MTK | 3–0 | Rákospalota | Budapest |
| | Pátkai 17'; Zsidai (yellow card) 21'; Pál 60'; Bori 70' | Report | Madar (yellow card) 14'; Pusztai (yellow card) 83' | Stadium: Hidegkuti Nándor Stadion; Attendance: 500; Referee: Ferenc Bede |

| 29 November 2007 15 | Sopron | 1–5 | MTK | Sopron |
| | C. Galliano (yellow card) 32'; Tchana 45'; Fehér (yellow card) 60' | Report | Urbán 13', 20', 66', 90+1'; C. Galliano 75' (o.g.) | Stadium: Káposztás utcai Stadion; Referee: István Mészáros |

| 25 February 2008 16 | Fehérvár | 1–0 | MTK | Székesfehérvár |
| | Sitku 33' | Report | | Stadium: Sóstói Stadion; Referee: Péter Solymosi |

| 1 March 2008 17 | MTK | 1–1 | Paks | Budapest |
| | Kanta 78' | Report | Báló 28' | Stadium: Hidegkuti Nándor Stadion; Referee: Viktor Kassai |

| 8 March 2008 18 | Újpest | 1–3 | MTK | Budapest |
| | Ebala 51' | Report | Lambulić 29'; Kanta 68', 71' | Stadium: Szusza Ferenc Stadion; Referee: Zsolt Szabó |

| 17 March 2008 19 | MTK | 1–1 | Diósgyőr | Budapest |
| | Kanta 55' | Report | Honma 90' | Stadium: Hidegkuti Nándor Stadion; Referee: Tamás Bognár |

| 22 March 2008 20 | Debrecen | 0–2 | MTK | Debrecen |
| | | Report | Pál 78'; Pollák 88' | Stadium: Oláh Gábor utcai Stadion; Referee: Viktor Kassai |

| 29 March 2008 21 | MTK | 3–0 | Siófok | Budapest |
| | Urbán 23', 77'; Lambulić 56' | Report | | Stadium: Hidegkuti Nándor Stadion; Referee: Szabolcs Szilasi |

| 4 April 2008 22 | Zalaegerszeg | 0–1 | MTK | Zalaegerszeg |
| | B. Molnár (yellow card) 65' | Report | Hrepka 14'; Á. Pintér II (yellow card) 37'; Pál (yellow card) 55'; Pollák (yellow card) 57' | Stadium: ZTE Arena; Referee: Ferenc Bede |

| 12 April 2008 23 | Győr | 1–0 | MTK | Győr |
| | Nikolov 51' | Report | | Stadium: ETO Park; Referee: Péter Solymosi |

| 18 April 2008 24 | MTK | 3–2 | Kaposvár | Budapest |
| | Urbán 4'; Lambulić 15'; Szabó 51' | Report | Obrić 75'; Nikolić 86' | Stadium: Hidegkuti Nándor Stadion; Referee: István Mészáros |

| 27 April 2008 25 | Honvéd | 0–2 | MTK | Budapest |
| | | Report | Pátkai 44'; Szabó 90+3' | Stadium: Bozsik József Stadion; Referee: Ferenc Bede |

| 3 May 2008 26 | MTK | 0–2 | Vasas | Budapest |
| | | Report | Pavičević 61'; Divić 90+2' | Stadium: Hidegkuti Nándor Stadion; Referee: Viktor Kassai |

| 9 May 2008 27 | Nyíregyháza | 0–2 | MTK | Nyíregyháza |
| | | Report | Kanta 29'; Urbán 51' | Stadium: Városi Stadion; Referee: Tamás Arany |

| 17 May 2008 28 | MTK | 5–1 | Tatabánya | Budapest |
| | Pollák 9'; Pintér 42'; Kanta 48', 81'; Urbán 83' | Report | Lázár 25' | Stadium: Hidegkuti Nándor Stadion; Referee: Zoltán Iványi |

| 26 May 2008 29 | Rákospalota | 0–3 | MTK | Sopron (Note: The match was played at the Káposztás utcai Stadion in Sopron, instead of REAC regular stadium, the Budai II. László Stadion in Budapest, which did not meet HFF requirements.) |
| | Sallai (yellow card) 24'; Dancs (yellow card) 36'; Kapcsos (yellow card) 40'; Zana (yellow card) 76' | Report | Lambulić 48', 90'; Kanta (yellow card) 58'; Urbán 67' | Stadium: Káposztás utcai Stadion; Attendance: 2,000; Referee: Ferenc Bede |

| 1 June 2008 30 | MTK | 3–0 (Awarded) | Sopron | Budapest |
| | | Report | | Stadium: Hidegkuti Nándor Stadion |
Note: After the exclusion of Sopron, the matches were registered with a goal difference of 3–0.

=== Magyar Kupa ===
| 26 September 2007 Round of 32 | Putnok | 0–0 | MTK | Putnok |
| | | Report | | Stadium: Várady Béla Sportközpont; Referee: János Takács |
Note: Putnok won as lower division team.

=== Ligakupa ===
==== Autumn season ====
===== Group stage =====
| Pos | Team | Pld | W | D | L | GF | GA | GD | Pts | Qualification | GYO | TAT | MTK | SOP |
|---|---|---|---|---|---|---|---|---|---|---|---|---|---|---|
| 1 | Győr | 6 | 4 | 0 | 2 | 13 | 8 | +5 | 12 | Advance to knockout phase | — | 3–0 | 1–0 | 1–2 |
| 2 | Tatabánya | 6 | 3 | 1 | 2 | 13 | 9 | +4 | 10 | Advance to knockout phase | 3–1 | — | 0–0 | 8–1 |
| 3 | MTK Budapest | 6 | 2 | 1 | 3 | 8 | 9 | −1 | 7 | | 2–3 | 4–1 | — | 2–1 |
| 4 | Sopron | 6 | 2 | 0 | 4 | 8 | 16 | −8 | 6 | | 1–4 | 0–1 | 3–0 | — |

Source: HFF

| 15 August 2007 1 | Tatabánya | 0–0 | MTK | Tatabánya |
| 17:30 CEST (UTC+2) | | Report | | Stadium: Stadion Városi; Referee: Szabolcs Szilasi |

| 22 August 2007 2 | MTK | 2–3 | Győr | Budapest |
| 16:00 CEST (UTC+2) | Szabó 54', 79' | Report | L. Varga 43', 64'; Granát 45' | Stadium: Hidegkuti Nándor Stadion; Referee: Mihály Fábián |

| 9 September 2007 3 | MTK | 2–1 | Sopron | Budapest |
| 19:00 CEST (UTC+2) | Lencse 30'; Kecskés 85' | Report | Györök 90+2' | Stadium: Hidegkuti Nándor Stadion; Referee: Tamás Arany |

| 19 September 2007 4 | Sopron | 3–0 | MTK | Sopron |
| 17:00 CEST (UTC+2) | Zana 25' (pen.); Csikós 66'; Birtalan 75' | Report | | Stadium: Káposztás utcai Stadion; Referee: István Vad |

| 3 October 2007 5 | MTK | 4–1 | Tatabánya | Budapest |
| 16:00 CEST (UTC+2) | M. Tóth 57'; Kecskés 60'; Simon 61'; Ladóczki 64' (pen.) | Report | Kozák 72' | Stadium: Hidegkuti Nándor Stadion; Referee: Róbert Nagy |

| 10 October 2007 6 | Győr | 1–0 | MTK | Győr |
| 15:00 CEST (UTC+2) | Brnović 48' | Report | | Stadium: ETO Park; Referee: Viktor Kassai |

==== Spring season ====
===== Group stage =====
| Pos | Team | Pld | W | D | L | GF | GA | GD | Pts | Qualification | MTK | UJP | VAS | DIO |
|---|---|---|---|---|---|---|---|---|---|---|---|---|---|---|
| 1 | MTK Budapest | 6 | 4 | 2 | 0 | 12 | 6 | +6 | 14 | Advance to knockout phase | — | 2–0 | 3–2 | 2–1 |
| 2 | Újpest | 6 | 3 | 0 | 3 | 14 | 9 | +5 | 9 | Advance to knockout phase | 1–3 | — | 1–2 | 3–1 |
| 3 | Vasas | 6 | 2 | 1 | 3 | 9 | 16 | −7 | 7 | | 1–1 | 0–7 | — | 4–1 |
| 4 | Diósgyőr | 6 | 1 | 1 | 4 | 8 | 12 | −4 | 4 | | 1–1 | 1–2 | 3–0 | — |

Source: HFF

| 1 December 2007 1 | Újpest | 1–3 | MTK | Budapest |
| 13:00 CET (UTC+1) | Moldovan 88' | Report | Pollák 29'; Kulcsár 55', 78' | Stadium: Szusza Ferenc Stadion; Referee: Csaba Imre Sápi |

| 5 December 2007 2 | MTK | 3–2 | Vasas | Budapest |
| 18:00 CET (UTC+1) | Bori 11'; Kanta 70', 73' | Report | | Stadium: Hidegkuti Nándor Stadion; Referee: Tamás Bognár |

| 8 December 2007 3 | MTK | 2–1 | Diósgyőr | Budapest |
| 13:00 CET (UTC+1) | Urbán 28'; Bori 66' | Report | Lipusz 40' | Stadium: Hidegkuti Nándor Stadion; Referee: Péter Pető |

| 16 February 2008 4 | Vasas | 1–1 | MTK | Budapest |
| 13:00 CET (UTC+1) | Németh 58' | Report | Kanta 75' | Stadium: Promontor utcai Stadion; Referee: Ferenc Bede |

| 20 February 2008 5 | MTK | 2–0 | Újpest | Budapest |
| 18:00 CET (UTC+1) | Lambulić 52'; Szabó 78' | Report | | Stadium: Hidegkuti Nándor Stadion; Referee: Roland Veizer |

| 27 February 2008 6 | Diósgyőr | 1–1 | MTK | Miskolc |
| 14:00 CET (UTC+1) | Simon 18' | Report | Rodenbücher 90+1' | Stadium: Diósgyőri Stadion; Referee: Csaba Imre Sápi |

===== Knockout phase =====
====== Quarter-finals ======
| 5 March 2008 First leg | Rákospalota | 0–4 | MTK | Budapest |
| | Erős (yellow card) 24' | Report | Gosztonyi 13'; M. Molnár 16'; Kecskés 62' (pen.); Vadnai 77' | Stadium: Stadion Budai II. Laszló; Attendance: 100; Referee: István Mészáros |

| 12 March 2008 Second leg | MTK | 6–0 (10–0 agg.) | Rákospalota | Budapest |
| | Lencse 6', 54'; Kecskés 44' (pen.); Gosztonyi 51'; L. Horváth 55'; P. Boda 81' | Report | Rása (yellow card) 43'; F. Baghy (yellow card) 90' | Stadium: Hidegkuti Nándor Stadion; Attendance: 100; Referee: Ádám Németh |
Note: MTK won 10-0 on aggregate.

====== Semi-finals ======
| 15 April 2008 First leg | MTK | 1–1 | Győr | Budapest |
| | Rodenbücher 53' | Report | Kovács 64' | Stadium: Hidegkuti Nándor Stadion; Referee: Zsolt Szabó |

| 23 April 2008 Second leg | Győr | 2–0 (3–1 agg.) | MTK | Győr |
| | L. Varga 11'; Dudás 70' | Report | | Stadium: ETO Park; Referee: Tamás Arany |
Note: Győr won 3–1 on aggregate.

=== UEFA Cup ===
==== Qualifying rounds ====
===== First qualifying round =====
| 19 July 2007 First leg | MTK (Hungary) | 2–1 | (Armenia) Mika | Budapest, Hungary |
| 20:30 CEST (UTC+2) | Pintér 20'; Urbán 57' | Report | Rodrigues 45' | Stadium: Szusza Ferenc Stadion; Attendance: 1,050; Referee: Garðar Örn Hinriksson (Iceland) |

| 2 August 2007 Second leg | Mika (Armenia) | 1–0 ((a) 2–2 agg.) | (Hungary) MTK | Yerevan, Armenia |
| 19:00 AMST (UTC+5) | A. Adamyan 26'; I. Ristic (yellow card) 70' | Report | | Stadium: Hanrapetakan Stadium; Attendance: 6,000; Referee: Augustus Viorel Constantin (Romania) |
Note: 2–2 on aggregate. Mika won on away goals.
