= Levente Horváth =

Hungarian footballer (born 1982)

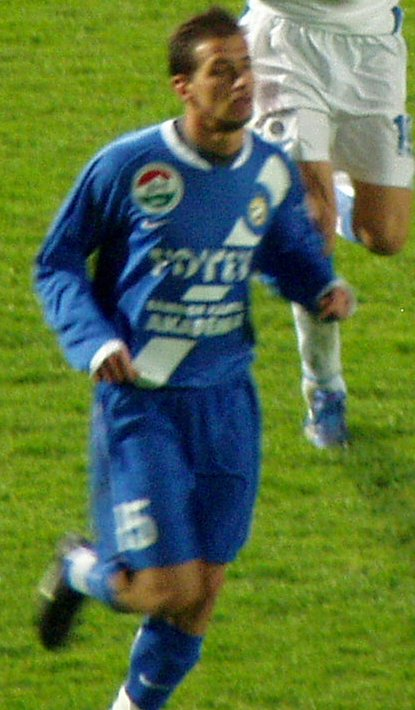
- Horváth playing for MTK in 2008

Personal information
- Date of birth: 13 April 1982 (age 44)
- Place of birth: Budapest, Hungary
- Height: 1.77 m (5 ft 10 in)
- Positions: Defender; midfielder

Youth career
- 1996–1997: Újpest
- 1997–2000: MTK

Senior career*
Years	Team	Apps	(Gls)
2000–2009	MTK	129	(3)
2002	→ BKV Előre (loan)	2	(0)
2003–2004	→ Bodajk (loan)	23	(0)
2009–2010	Paks	41	(1)
2010–2011	Nyíregyháza	16	(0)
2011–2013	Pápa	32	(0)
2013–2014	Vasas	25	(1)
2014–2017	Budaörs	66	(3)
2017–2022	Rákospalota	105	(4)
2022	Ajka Kristály	12	(0)
2023–2024	Testvériség	19	(0)
2024	Testvériség II	1	(0)
Total		471	(12)
- * Club domestic league appearances and goals

Levente Horváth (born 13 April 1982) is a Hungarian former professional footballer who played as a defender and midfielder.

== Career statistics ==
Appearances and goals by club, season and competition
Club	Season	League			Magyar Kupa		Ligakupa		Europe		Other		Total	
Club	Season	Division	Apps	Goals	Apps	Goals	Apps	Goals	Apps	Goals	Apps	Goals	Apps	Goals
MTK	2000–01	Nemzeti Bajnokság I	2	0	—		—		—		—		2	0
MTK	2001–02	Nemzeti Bajnokság I	26	0	1	0	—		—		—		27	0
MTK	2002–03	Nemzeti Bajnokság I	9	0	1	0	—		—		—		10	0
MTK	2004–05	Nemzeti Bajnokság I	23	0	2	0	—		—		—		25	0
MTK	2005–06	Nemzeti Bajnokság I	24	1	3	0	—		—		—		27	1
MTK	2006–07	Nemzeti Bajnokság I	19	2	2	0	—		—		—		21	2
MTK	2007–08	Nemzeti Bajnokság I	24	0	1	0	4	1	2 (Note: Appearances in UEFA Cup)	0	—		31	1
MTK	2008–09	Nemzeti Bajnokság I	2	0	—		—		2 (Note: Appearances in UEFA Champions League)	0	1 (Note: Appearance in Szuperkupa)	0	5	0
MTK	Total		129	3	10	0	4	1	4	0	1	0	148	4
BKV Előre (loan)	2001–02	Nemzeti Bajnokság II	2	0	—		—		—		—		2	0
Bodajk (loan)	2003–04	Nemzeti Bajnokság II	23	0	2	0	—		—		—		25	0
Paks	2008–09	Nemzeti Bajnokság I	13	1	—		2	0	—		—		15	1
Paks	2009–10	Nemzeti Bajnokság I	28	0	2	0	4	0	—		—		34	0
Paks	Total		41	1	2	0	6	0	—		—		49	1
Nyíregyháza	2010–11	Nemzeti Bajnokság II	16	0	—		—		—		—		16	0
Pápa	2011–12	Nemzeti Bajnokság I	24	0	2	0	6	0	—		—		32	0
Pápa	2012–13	Nemzeti Bajnokság I	8	0	1	0	2	0	—		—		11	0
Pápa	Total		32	0	3	0	8	0	—		—		43	0
Vasas	2013–14	Nemzeti Bajnokság II	25	1	1	0	5	0	—		—		31	1
Budaörs	2014–15	Nemzeti Bajnokság III	23	2	0	0	—		—		—		23	2
Budaörs	2015–16	Nemzeti Bajnokság II	22	0	—		—		—		—		22	0
Budaörs	2016–17	Nemzeti Bajnokság II	21	1	1	0	—		—		—		22	1
Budaörs	Total		66	3	1	0	—		—		—		67	3
Rákospalota	2017–18	Megyei Bajnokság I	25	0	—		—		—		7 (Note: Five appearances in Budapest Kupa, two appearances in Megyei Bajnokság I promotion play-offs)	0	32	0
Rákospalota	2018–19	Megyei Bajnokság I	26	0	—		—		—		2 (Note: Appearances in Budapest Kupa)	0	28	0
Rákospalota	2019–20	Megyei Bajnokság I	18	0	—		—		—		3 (Note: Two appearances in Magyar Kupa qualifying rounds, one appearance in Budapest Kupa)	0	21	0
Rákospalota	2020–21	Megyei Bajnokság I	23	1	—		—		—		2 (Note: One appearance in Magyar Kupa qualifying rounds, one appearance in Budapest Kupa)	0	25	1
Rákospalota	2021–22	Megyei Bajnokság I	13	3	—		—		—		—		13	3
Rákospalota	Total		105	4	—		—		—		14	0	119	4
Ajka Kristály	2021–22	Megyei Bajnokság I	12	0	—		—		—		—		12	0
Testvériség	2023–24	Megyei Bajnokság I	19	0	—		—		—		1 (Note: Appearance in Magyar Kupa qualifying rounds)	0	20	0
Testvériség II	2023–24	Megyei Bajnokság II	1	0	—		—		—		—		1	0
Career total			471	12	19	0	23	1	4	0	16	0	533	13

== Honours ==
MTK

- Nemzeti Bajnokság I: 2002–03, 2007–08
- Szuperkupa: 2008

Paks

- Ligakupa runner-up: 2009–10

Budaörs

- Nemzeti Bajnokság III – West: 2014–15

Rákospalota

- Megyei Bajnokság I – Budapest: 2017–18
- Budapest Kupa: 2017–18; runner-up: 2018–19
