= Goran Jezdimirović =

Serbian footballer

Personal information
- Full name: Goran Jezdimirović
- Date of birth: 19 April 1967 (age 59)
- Place of birth: Vrnjačka Banja, SR Serbia, SFR Yugoslavia
- Height: 1.80 m (5 ft 11 in)
- Position: Midfielder

Youth career
- Sloga Kraljevo

Senior career*
Years	Team	Apps	(Gls)
1986–1990	Napredak Kruševac	108	(8)
1990–1996	Vojvodina	144	(13)
1996–1997	Écija	11	(0)
1998–2000	Milicionar	47	(0)
2000–2006	MTK Budapest	151	(2)
2006	Tatabánya	11	(0)
2007	Dunaújváros	4	(0)
Total		476	(23)
- * Club domestic league appearances and goals

Goran Jezdimirović (Serbian Cyrillic: Горан Јездимировић; born 19 April 1967) is a Serbian former professional footballer who played as a midfielder.

== Career ==
After playing for Sloga Kraljevo, Jezdimirović joined Napredak Kruševac in 1986. He spent four seasons at the club, making over 100 league appearances. In 1990, Jezdimirović switched to Vojvodina. He would later play for Spanish club Écija, as well as for Hungarian clubs MTK Budapest, Tatabánya and Dunaújváros, before retiring at the age of 40.

== Career statistics ==
Club	Season	League	
Club	Season	Apps	Goals
Napredak Kruševac	1986–87	29	1
Napredak Kruševac	1987–88	31	2
Napredak Kruševac	1988–89	31	4
Napredak Kruševac	1989–90	17	1
Napredak Kruševac	Total	108	8
Vojvodina	1990–91	13	1
Vojvodina	1991–92	23	1
Vojvodina	1992–93	30	5
Vojvodina	1993–94	27	3
Vojvodina	1994–95	28	1
Vojvodina	1995–96	23	2
Vojvodina	Total	144	13
Milicionar	1998–99	17	0
Milicionar	1999–2000	30	0
Milicionar	Total	47	0

== Honours ==
Napredak Kruševac

- Yugoslav Second League: 1987–88

MTK Budapest

- Nemzeti Bajnokság I: 2002–03
- Szuperkupa: 2003
