= András Selei =

Hungarian footballer (born 1985)

Personal information
- Full name: András Selei
- Date of birth: 5 May 1985 (age 41)
- Place of birth: Budapest, Hungary
- Height: 1.80 m (5 ft 11 in)
- Position: Midfielder

Youth career
- 2002–2004: Ferencváros

Senior career*
Years	Team	Apps	(Gls)
2004–2005	Zalaegerszeg	14	(0)
2005–2008	MTK	10	(0)
2007	→ Siófok (loan)	4	(0)
2007	→ Siófok II (loan)	2	(0)
2008	→ Rákospalota (loan)	6	(0)
2008	→ Rákospalota II (loan)	5	(2)
2008–2010	Cegléd	57	(13)
2010–2012	BKV Előre	43	(5)
2012–2016	Monor	90	(26)
2016–2021	BÜSKE	41	(35)
Total		272	(81)

International career
2001–2002	Hungary U17	6	(1)
2003–2004	Hungary U19	4	(0)
- * Club domestic league appearances and goals

András Selei (born 5 May 1985) is a Hungarian former professional footballer, who played as a midfielder, and is now the director of Football of Nemzeti Bajnokság I club MTK.

== Club career ==
=== Zalaegerszeg ===
On 2 July 2004, Selei signed his first professional contract with Zalaegerszeg as a 40 time Hungary youth international.

On 1 August 2004, he played his first match in a 1–0 win against Pécs in the Nemzeti Bajnokság I.

=== MTK ===
On 20 June 2005, it was reported that Selei joined MTK.

=== Siófok ===
On 10 July 2007, he moved to Siófok.

=== Rákospalota ===
Selei has been on trial at Rákospalota since the first trainings for the second half of the 2007–08 season. He was officially signed on 31 January 2008.

== Executive career ==
On 23 June 2022, Selei was appointed as club director during the management renewal at MTK. He was already working for the club as a legal manager for many years, and before that past two seasons he has been overseeing the U19 team, which has won two gold medals in the last two seasons, and the reserve team as a sports manager.

== Career statistics ==
=== Club ===
Appearances and goals by club, season and competition
Club	Season	League			National cup (Note: Includes Magyar Kupa)		League cup (Note: Includes Ligakupa)		Total	
Club	Season	Division	Apps	Goals	Apps	Goals	Apps	Goals	Apps	Goals
Zalaegerszeg	2004–05	Nemzeti Bajnokság I	14	0	1	0	—		15	0
MTK	2005–06	Nemzeti Bajnokság I	8	0	4	2	—		12	2
MTK	2006–07	Nemzeti Bajnokság I	2	0	1	0	—		3	0
MTK	Total		10	0	5	2	—		11	0
Siófok (loan)	2007–08	Nemzeti Bajnokság I	4	0	—		2	0	6	0
Siófok II (loan)	2007–08	Nemzeti Bajnokság III	2	0	—		—		2	0
Rákospalota (loan)	2007–08	Nemzeti Bajnokság I	6	0	—		5	0	11	0
Rákospalota II (loan)	2007–08	Nemzeti Bajnokság III	5	2	—		—		5	2
Cegléd	2008–09	Nemzeti Bajnokság II	30	4	1	0	—		31	4
Cegléd	2009–10	Nemzeti Bajnokság II	27	9	3	1	—		30	10
Cegléd	Total		57	13	4	1	—		61	14
BKV Előre	2010–11	Nemzeti Bajnokság II	23	2	3	0	—		26	2
BKV Előre	2011–12	Nemzeti Bajnokság II	20	3	1	0	—		21	3
BKV Előre	Total		43	5	4	0	—		47	5
Monor	2012–13	Nemzeti Bajnokság III	25	15	—		—		25	15
Monor	2013–14	Nemzeti Bajnokság III	24	7	—		—		24	7
Monor	2014–15	Nemzeti Bajnokság III	15	3	—		—		15	3
Monor	2015–16	Nemzeti Bajnokság III	26	1	0	0	—		26	1
Monor	Total		90	26	0	0	—		90	26
BÜSKE	2016–17	Megyei Bajnokság III	14	17	—		—		14	17
BÜSKE	2017–18	Megyei Bajnokság III	10	7	—		—		10	7
BÜSKE	2018–19	Megyei Bajnokság III	12	11	—		—		12	11
BÜSKE	2019–20	Megyei Bajnokság III	3	0	—		—		3	0
BÜSKE	2020–21	Megyei Bajnokság III	2	0	—		—		2	0
BÜSKE	Total		41	35	—		—		41	35
Career total			272	81	14	3	7	0	293	84

== Honours ==
MTK

- Ligabajnokság: 2005–06, 2006–07
