= Péter Bonifert =

Hungarian footballer

Personal information
- Date of birth: 4 July 1985 (age 41)
- Place of birth: Budapest, Hungary
- Height: 1.79 m (5 ft 10 in)
- Position: Forward

Team information
- Current team: Szigetszentmiklós
- Number: 14

Youth career
- 2003–2004: Vasas

Senior career*
Years	Team	Apps	(Gls)
2004–2010	MTK	14	(2)
2007–2008	→ Siófok (loan)	12	(2)
2008–2009	→ Haladás (loan)	0	(0)
2009–2010	→ MTK II	13	(5)
2010–2012	Szigetszentmiklós	47	(10)
2012–2013	Leoben	24	(3)
2013–	Szigetszentmiklós	10	(1)
- * Club domestic league appearances and goals as of 1 March 2014

Péter Bonifert (born 4 July 1985) is a Hungarian football player who currently plays for DSV Leoben.
