= Béla Balogh (footballer) =

Hungarian footballer (born 1984)

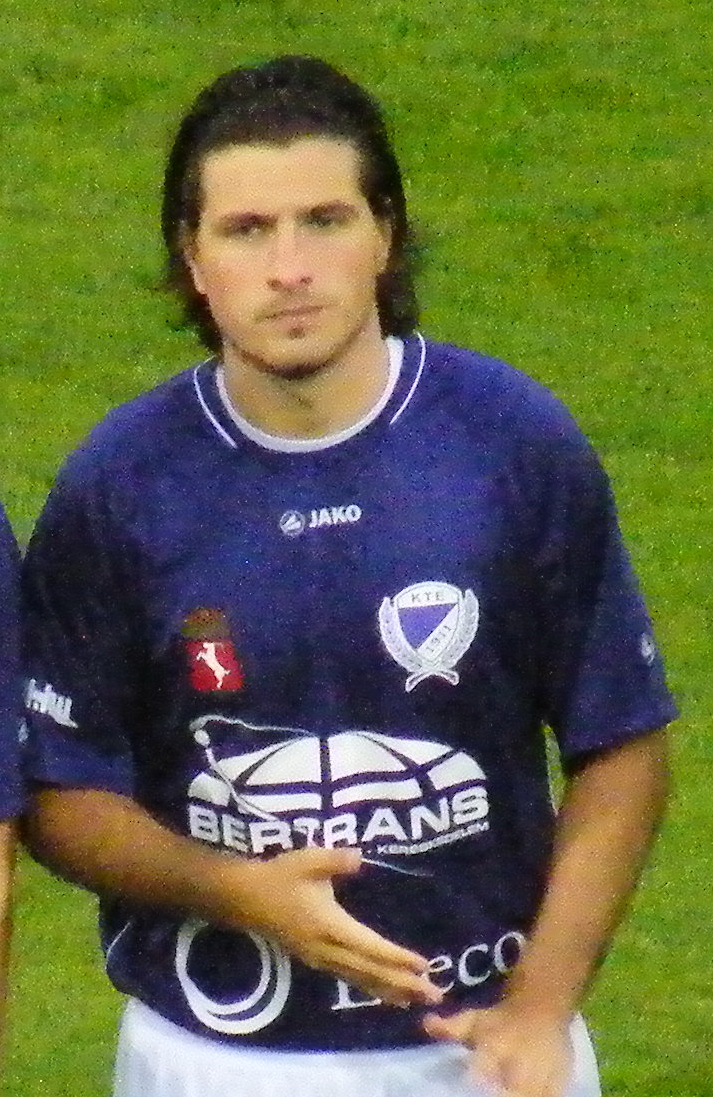
- Balogh playing for Kecskeméti TE in August 2010.

Personal information
- Full name: Béla Balogh
- Date of birth: 30 December 1984 (age 41)
- Place of birth: Budapest, Hungary
- Height: 6 ft 1 in (1.85 m)
- Position: Centre back

Senior career*
Years	Team	Apps	(Gls)
2002–2010	MTK Budapest	104	(10)
2002–2004	→ Siófok (loan)	20	(1)
2007–2008	→ Colchester United (loan)	17	(0)
2008–2009	→ Real Murcia (loan)	6	(0)
2010–2013	Kecskemét	64	(2)
2013–2015	Pécsi	58	(1)
2015–2017	Gyirmót	35	(4)
2017	Mezőkövesd	3	(1)
2017–2019	MTK Budapest	47	(4)
2019–2021	Budapesti VSC		

International career
2006–2007	Hungary	9	(0)
- * Club domestic league appearances and goals as of 23:15, 16 November 2019 (UTC)

Béla Balogh (born 30 December 1984) is a Hungarian footballer who plays as a centre back.

Balogh has represented MTK Hungária, BFC Siófok, Kecskeméti TE and Pécsi MFC in Hungary and has also played for Colchester United in England and Real Murcia in Spain. He has also represented Hungary nine times at full international level.

== Career ==
Born in Budapest, Hungary, Balogh began his career with MTK Hungária in 2002, being loaned out to BFC Siófok for two seasons between 2002 and 2004. He made over 100 league appearances for MTK between 2002 and 2010.

In August 2007, Balogh signed on loan for English Championship club Colchester United with a view to a permanent move. He returned to MTK after his loan in May 2008 having made 17 appearances for the U's. He signed on loan with Spanish club Real Murcia for the 2008–09 season.

In 2010, Balogh signed for Kecskeméti TE. He spent three seasons with the club, making 64 appearances. In 2013, he joined Pécsi MFC.

== International statistics ==
Between 2006 and 2007, Balogh made nine appearances for the Hungary national football team.

Hungary national team
Year	Apps	Goals
2006	1	0
2007	8	0
Total	9	0
