= Gábor Urbán =

Hungarian footballer

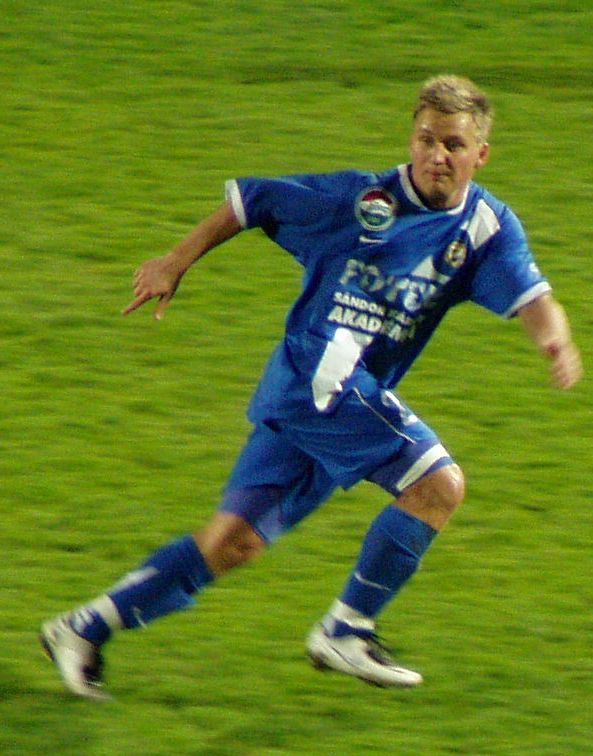

Personal information
- Full name: Gábor Urbán
- Date of birth: 30 December 1984 (age 41)
- Place of birth: Budapest, Hungary
- Height: 1.74 m (5 ft 8 1/2 in)
- Position: Striker

Team information
- Current team: Alsónémedi
- Number: 7

Youth career
- 1998–2002: Ferencváros
- 2002–2004: MTK

Senior career*
Years	Team	Apps	(Gls)
2004–2005	Siófok	23	(8)
2005–2011	MTK	66	(27)
2009–2010	→ Paks (loan)	14	(0)
2011–2012	Kecskemét	1	(0)
2012–2013	Szigetszentmiklós	34	(9)
2013–2014	Dunaújváros	12	(3)
2014–2015	Hofstetten-Grünau	26	(15)
2015	Gyula	6	(0)
2015–2016	Budafok	9	(1)
2016–2018	Monor	44	(22)
2018–	Alsónémedi	51	(37)
- * Club domestic league appearances and goals as of 7 February 2022

Gábor Urbán (born 30 December 1984) is a Hungarian football player.

== Honours ==
MTK

- Nemzeti Bajnokság I: 2007–08

Paksi FC

- Ligakupa: 2009–10
