= András Pál =

Hungarian footballer

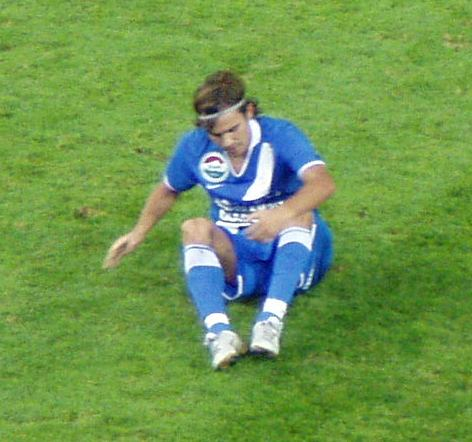

Personal information
- Date of birth: 19 August 1985 (age 41)
- Place of birth: Budapest, Hungary
- Height: 1.80 m (5 ft 11 in)
- Position: Striker

Youth career
- 1994–2001: Újpest
- 2001–2003: Vasas

Senior career*
Years	Team	Apps	(Gls)
2002–2003	Vasas	7	(0)
2003–2013	MTK	138	(22)
2004–2005	→ Bodajk (loan)	16	(6)
2013–2014	Siófok	13	(0)
2014–2020	Soroksár	135	(20)
2020–2022	Tiszakécske	40	(10)

International career
2001–2002	Hungary U-17	4	(0)
2003–2004	Hungary U-19	3	(0)
- * Club domestic league appearances and goals as of 8 May 2022

András Pál (born 19 August 1985) is a Hungarian soccer player.

== Career statistics ==
As of 7 February 2022

Appearances and goals by club, season and competition
Club	Season	League			Cup		Continental		Other		Total	
Club	Season	Division	Apps	Goals	Apps	Goals	Apps	Goals	Apps	Goals	Apps	Goals
Vasas	2002–03	Nemzeti Bajnokság II	7	0	0	0	—		—		7	0
Vasas	Total		7	0	0	0	0	0	0	0	7	0
Bodajk	2003–04	Nemzeti Bajnokság II	?	?	3	0	—		—		3	0
Bodajk	2004–05	Nemzeti Bajnokság II	16	6	3	1	—		—		19	7
Bodajk	Total		16	6	6	1	0	0	0	0	22	7
MTK Budapest	2005–06	Nemzeti Bajnokság I	14	0	0	0	—		—		14	0
MTK Budapest	2006–07	Nemzeti Bajnokság I	25	4	4	2	—		—		29	6
MTK Budapest	2007–08	Nemzeti Bajnokság I	17	2	0	0	2	0	2	0	21	2
MTK Budapest	2008–09	Nemzeti Bajnokság I	7	5	0	0	2	0	1	0	10	5
MTK Budapest	2009–10	Nemzeti Bajnokság I	21	8	6	0	—		1	1	28	9
MTK Budapest	2010–11	Nemzeti Bajnokság I	28	2	5	0	—		0	0	33	2
MTK Budapest	2011–12	Nemzeti Bajnokság II	13	1	4	0	—		0	0	17	1
MTK Budapest	2012–13	Nemzeti Bajnokság I	7	0	0	0	0	0	3	0	10	0
MTK Budapest	2013–14	Nemzeti Bajnokság I	6	0	0	0	—		0	0	6	0
MTK Budapest	Total		138	22	19	2	4	0	7	1	168	25
Siófok	2013–14	Nemzeti Bajnokság II	13	0	3	3	—		—		16	3
Siófok	Total		13	0	3	3	0	0	0	0	16	3
Soroksár	2014–15	Nemzeti Bajnokság II	15	4	0	0	—		—		15	4
Soroksár	2015–16	Nemzeti Bajnokság II	28	5	2	1	—		—		30	6
Soroksár	2016–17	Nemzeti Bajnokság II	28	4	0	0	—		—		28	4
Soroksár	2017–18	Nemzeti Bajnokság II	30	7	3	3	—		—		33	10
Soroksár	2018–19	Nemzeti Bajnokság II	22	0	6	0	—		—		28	0
Soroksár	2019–20	Nemzeti Bajnokság II	12	0	2	1	—		—		14	1
Soroksár	Total		135	20	13	5	0	0	0	0	148	25
Tiszakécske	2020–21	Nemzeti Bajnokság III	26	9	0	0	—		—		26	9
Tiszakécske	2021–22	Nemzeti Bajnokság II	0	0	0	0	—		—		0	0
Tiszakécske	Total		26	9	0	0	0	0	0	0	26	9
Career total			335	57	44	11	4	0	7	1	390	69
