= Gábor Bori =

Hungarian footballer (born 1984)

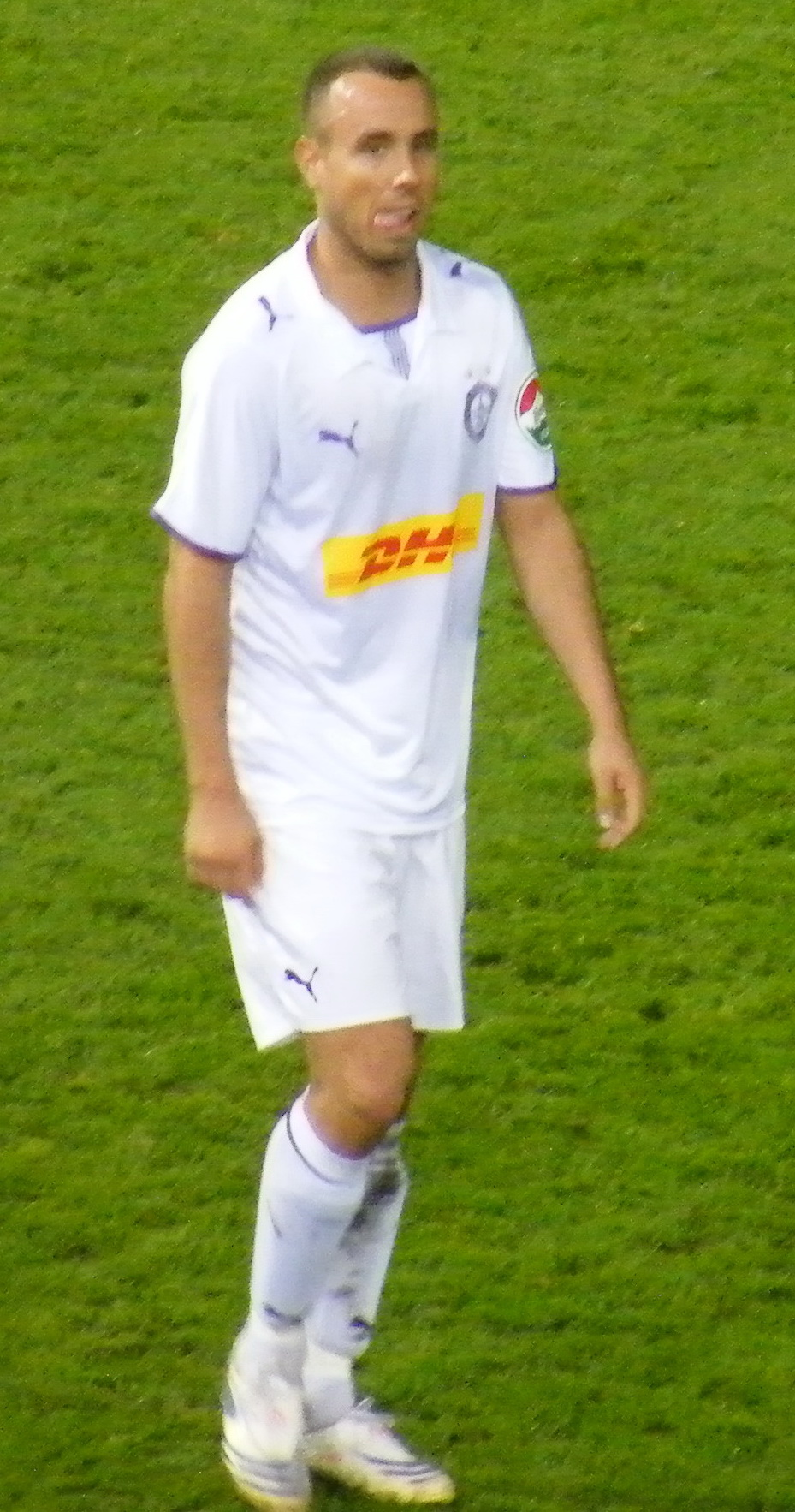
- Bori playing for Bicskei

Personal information
- Date of birth: 16 January 1984 (age 42)
- Place of birth: Szombathely, Hungary
- Height: 1.78 m (5 ft 10 in)
- Position: Right back

Team information
- Current team: Usc Pilgersdorf

Youth career
- Szombathely
- Győr
- MTK

Senior career*
Years	Team	Apps	(Gls)
2001–2010	MTK	106	(14)
2002–2004	→ Bodajk (loan)	21	(4)
2008	→ Leicester City (loan)	6	(0)
2008–2009	→ Újpest (loan)	22	(1)
2010	→ Kecskemét (loan)	15	(0)
2010	→ Volendam (loan)	0	(0)
2010–2012	Kecskemét	52	(3)
2012–2014	Paks	37	(0)
2014–2015	Diósgyőr	7	(0)
2014–2015	→ Vasas (loan)	15	(0)
2015	Vasas	17	(0)
2015–2017	Gyirmót	39	(0)
2017–2018	MTK	24	(0)
2018–2019	Monor	36	(3)
2019–2022	III. Kerület	7	(0)
2022–	Bicske		

International career^{‡}
1998–1999	Hungary U-14	3	(0)
1999–2000	Hungary U-15	12	(0)
2005	Hungary	1	(0)
- * Club domestic league appearances and goals as of 21 September 2019 ‡ National team caps and goals as of 20 October 2009

Gábor Bori (born 16 January 1984) is a Hungarian professional footballer who plays for Usc Pilgersdorf.

== Club career ==
Bori was born in Szombathely, Hungary. He was given a trial by Leicester City manager Ian Holloway on 17 December 2007, and he signed a loan deal on 8 January 2008 until the end of the season, linking up with compatriot Zsolt Laczkó, who arrived four days earlier. Part of his motivation for joining Leicester was Hungarian goalkeeper Márton Fülöp, who before being recalled to his parent club, helped him "a lot" during his trial period. Issued the number 34 shirt, both he and Laczkó were keen to earn permanent deals to stay at the club. Bori made his debut against Coventry City at the Walkers Stadium on 12 January, making four crosses and five shots in a 2–0 victory. He played a total of six league games as Leicester were relegated at the end of the season; a permanent deal never took place.

== International career ==
Bori made his senior debut in a 3–0 friendly win over Antigua and Barbuda on 18 December 2005 at the Florida International University in Miami, earning his first and only cap courtesy of then-manager Lothar Matthäus. His last call up to the national team was on 28 March 2007, as an unused substitute in a 2–0 Euro 2008 qualifying win over Moldova.
