= Mladen Lambulić =

Montenegrin football manager and player

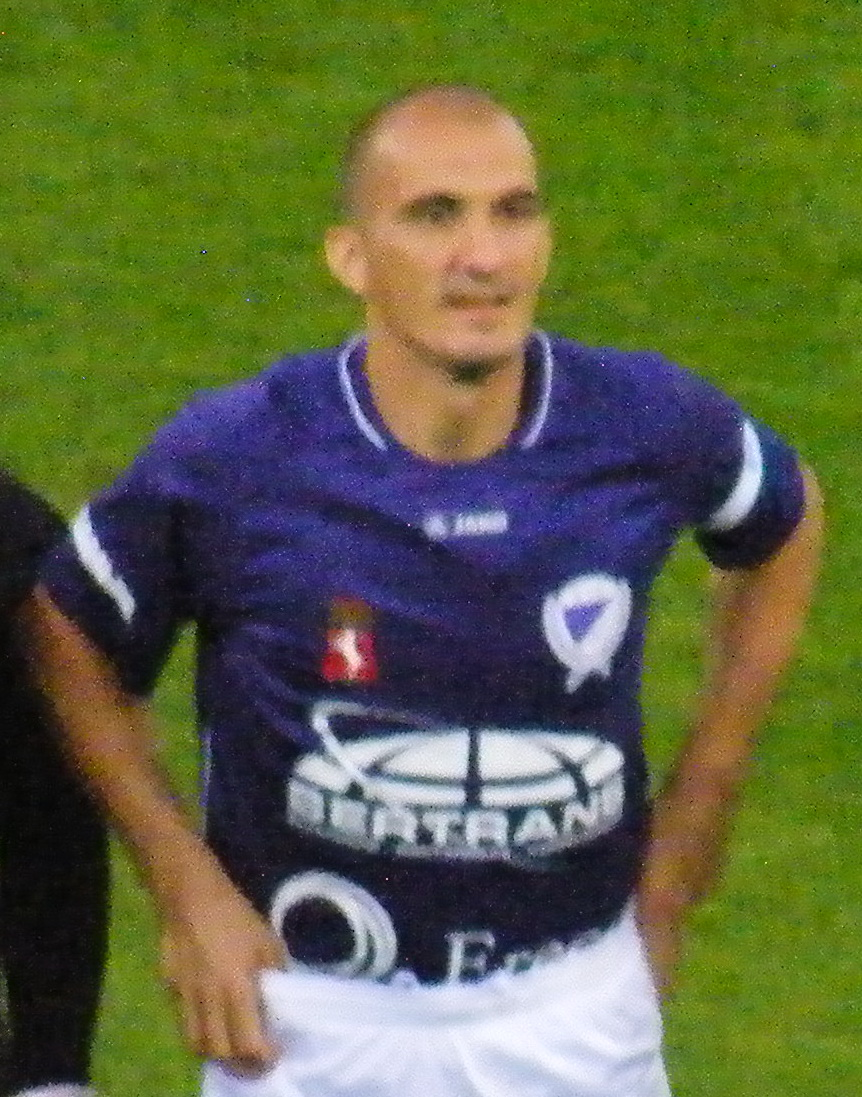
- Lambulić with Kecskemét in 2010

Personal information
- Full name: Mladen Lambulić
- Date of birth: 9 July 1972 (age 54)
- Place of birth: Titograd, SR Montenegro, SFR Yugoslavia
- Height: 1.84 m (6 ft 0 in)
- Position: Defender

Youth career
- Zeta

Senior career*
Years	Team	Apps	(Gls)
1993 Autumn	Lovćen Cetinje		
1994–1996	Radnički Beograd	59	(6)
1996–1999	Zemun	59	(2)
1999–2000	Denderleeuw		
2000–2001	Zeta	22	(3)
2002–2009	MTK Budapest	149	(19)
2003–2004	→ Sopron (loan)	40	(1)
2009	Újpest	6	(0)
2010	Kecskemét	24	(0)
Total		359+	(31+)

Managerial career
- 2014–2015: Zeta
- 2016–2017: Jezero
- 2020–2021: Jedinstvo Bijelo Polje
- 2021–2022: Jezero
- 2022–2023: Petrovac
- 2025: Rudar Pljevlja
- * Club domestic league appearances and goals

Mladen Lambulić (Serbian Cyrillic: Младен Ламбулић; born 9 July 1972) is a Montenegrin football manager and former player.

== Playing career ==
Lambulić played for Radnički Beograd and Zemun in the First League of FR Yugoslavia, before moving abroad to Belgium and signing with Denderleeuw in 1999. He subsequently returned to FR Yugoslavia and joined his mother club Zeta in 2000. During the 2002 winter transfer window, Lambulić moved abroad for the second time and signed with Hungarian side MTK Budapest. He spent the next seven and a half years with the club, winning the Nemzeti Bajnokság I in the 2007–08 season.

== Managerial career ==
After hanging up his boots, Lambulić started his managerial career at Zeta in 2014.

== Honours ==
MTK Budapest

- Nemzeti Bajnokság I: 2007–08
- Szuperkupa: 2008
