= Hidegkuti Nándor Stadion (1947) =

Former stadium in Budapest, Hungary

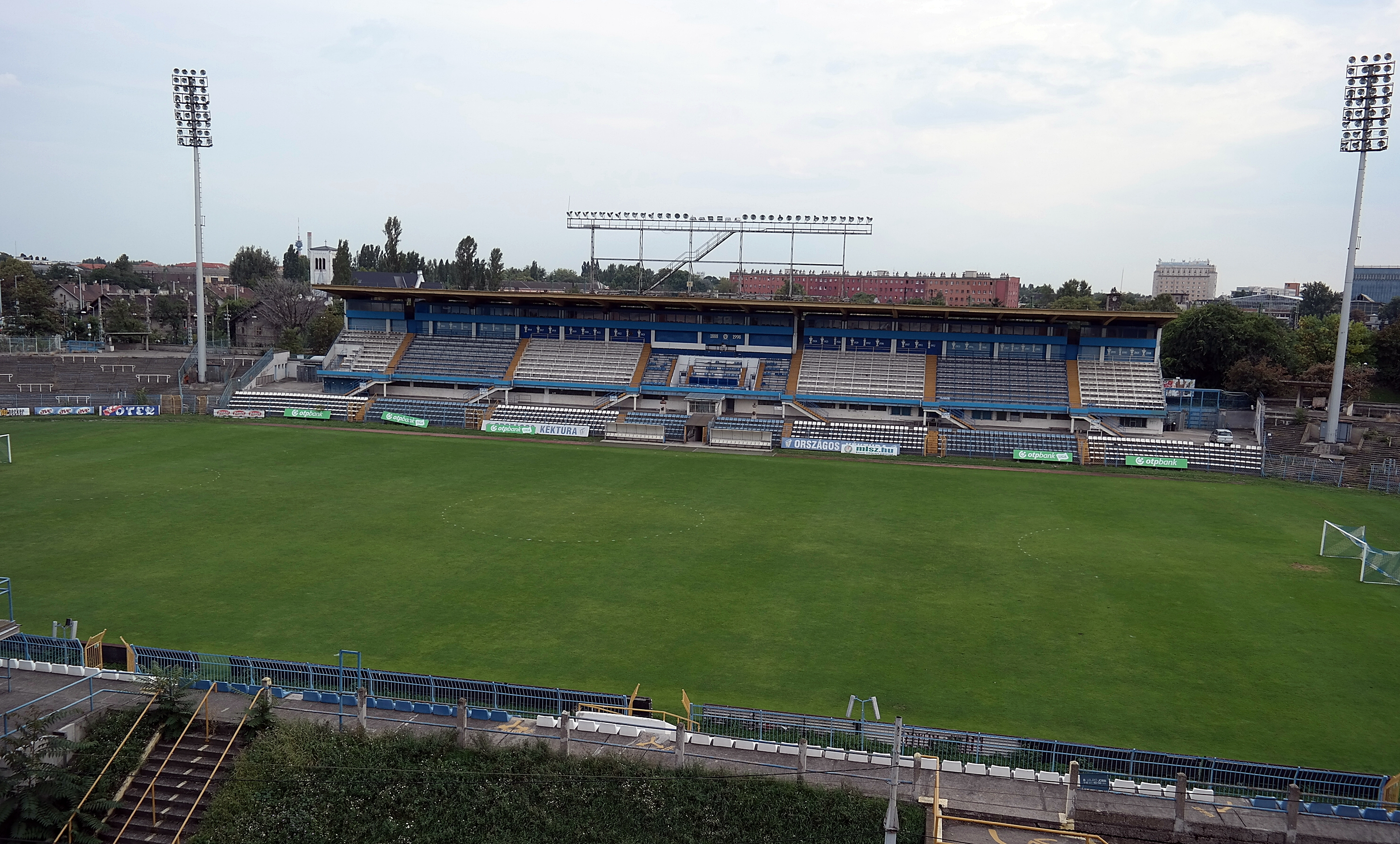
- Interactive map of Hidegkuti Nándor Stadion
- Full name: Hidegkuti Nándor Stadion
- Location: Budapest, Hungary
- Coordinates: 47°29′27″N 19°6′24″E
- Owner: MTK Budapest
- Operator: MTK Budapest
- Capacity: 12,700
- Surface: Grass; Field
- Field size: 105 m × 68 m (344 ft × 223 ft)

Construction
- Groundbreaking: 1946
- Built: 1946-47
- Opened: 1947
- Closed: 2014
- Demolished: 2015

Tenant
- MTK Budapest

Hidegkuti Nándor Stadion was a stadium in Budapest, Hungary. The stadium was opened on 1947 and it served as the home for the MTK Budapest FC until 2014. In 2015 the stadium was demolished, and a completely new arena was built between 2015 and 2016, named Hidegkuti Nándor Stadion.

== History ==
=== Construction ===
During the World War II the original MTK stadium was damaged, therefore a new stadium had to be built. Between 1945 and 1947 MTK played their home matches at their rivals' stadiums, namely Ferencváros and Újpest. In 1953 a concrete edge was built around the running tracks.

=== Demolition ===
On 6 November 2014, the demolition of the stadium started. First the floodlights system was uninstalled and then the seats were removed.

In May 2015 the demolition of the main stand started.

== Milestone matches ==
31 May 2014	MTK Budapest FC (Hungary)	2–0	(Hungary) Kaposvári Rákóczi FC	2013–14 Nemzeti Bajnokság I Last match
	Bese 34', 43'	(Report)		Attendance: 3,000; Referee: Pintér

== Other uses ==
=== Concerts ===
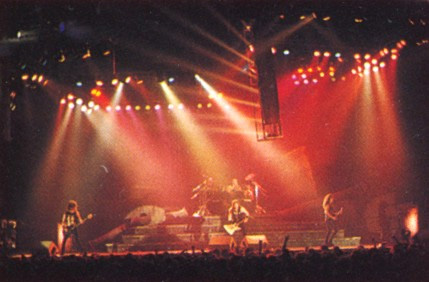
Metallica playing at the MTK stadium in 1988

In the 80es and 90es the stadium has become an important venue for international artists and band of the rock and metal genre, among them Santana, David Bowie, Tina Turner, Alice Cooper, Scorpions, Iron Maiden and Metallica. The latter one began their Damaged Justice tour at the stadium on September 11, 1988, while Scorpions played on 27 August 1986 its very first show in the Eastern Bloc.

=== Film location ===
The stadium was used in the 1981 football film Escape to Victory directed by John Huston, about Allied prisoners of war interned in a German prison camp during World War II who play an exhibition match against a German team.

== Photo gallery ==
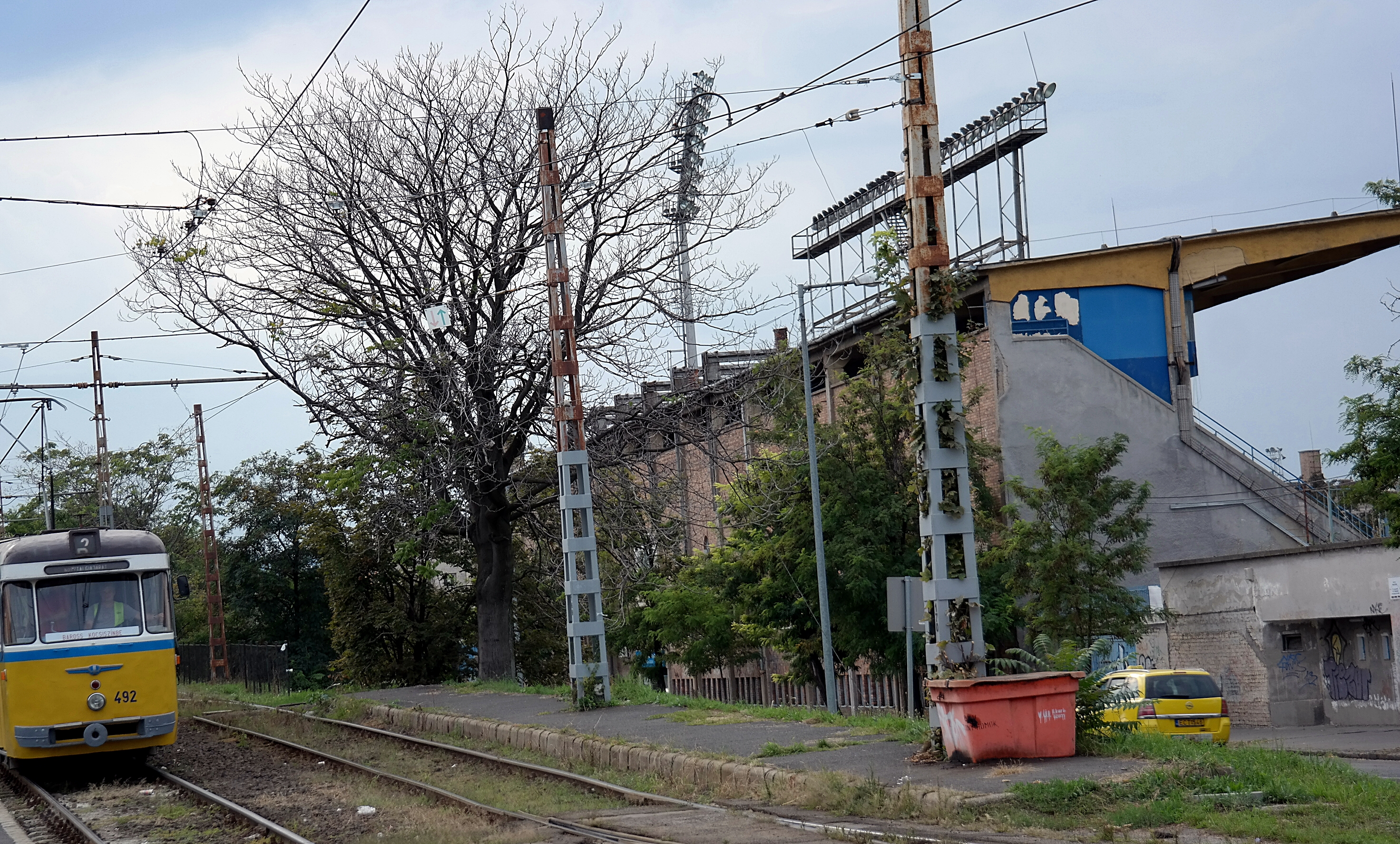
The demolished stadium in 2014

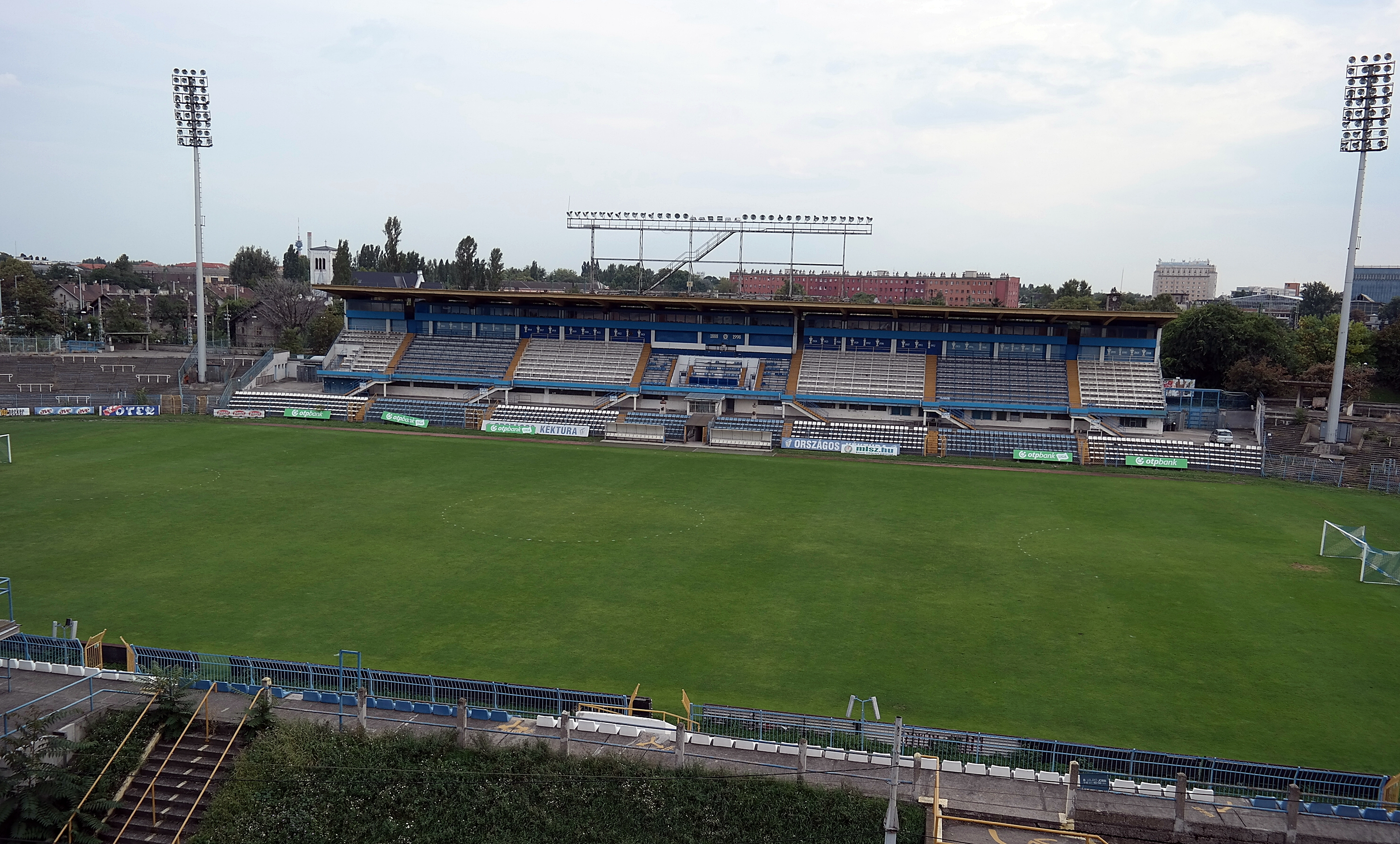

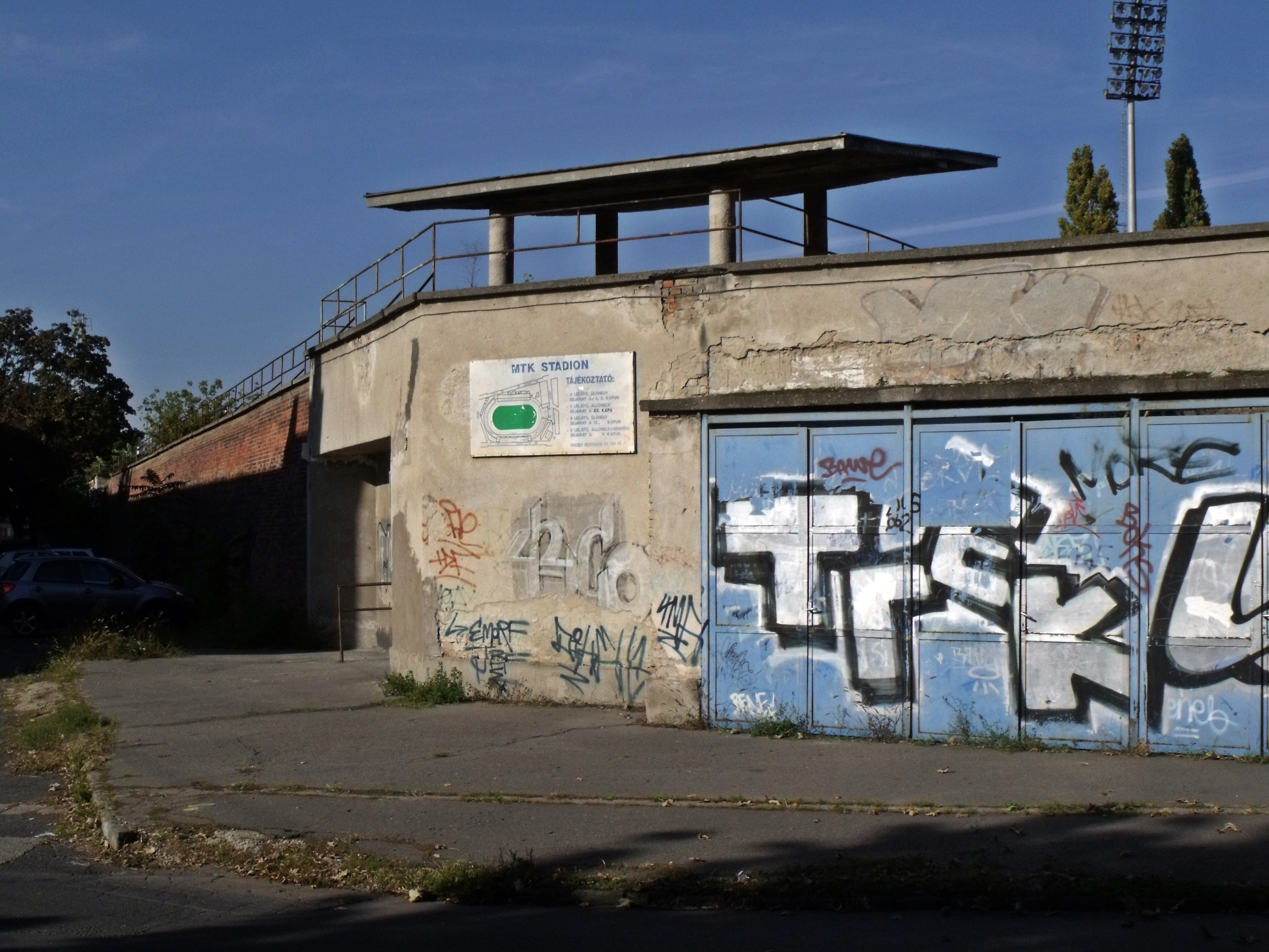
