= Zoltán Pollák =

Hungarian footballer

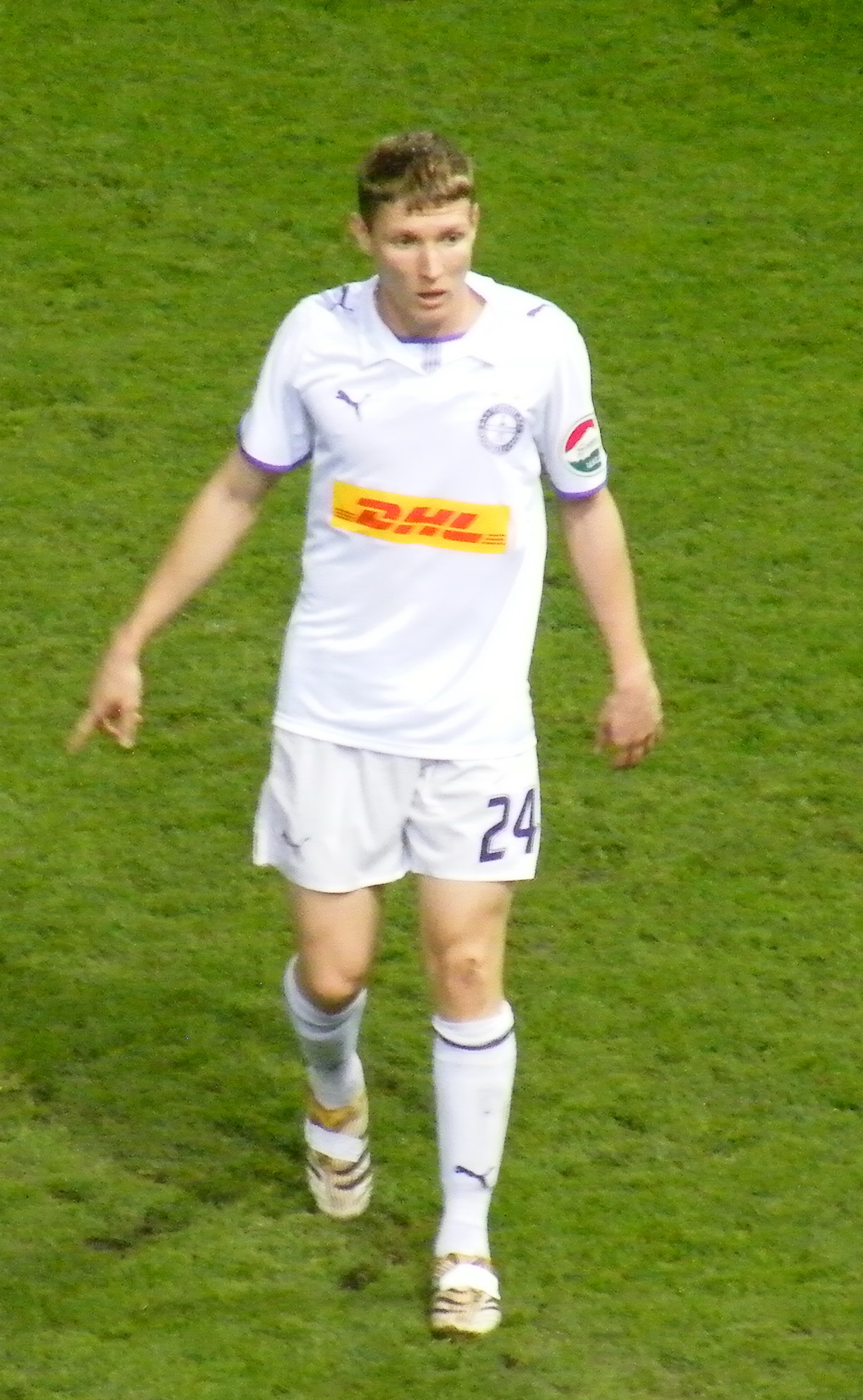

Personal information
- Full name: Zoltán Pollák
- Date of birth: 13 January 1984 (age 42)
- Place of birth: Miskolc, Hungary
- Height: 1.79 m (5 ft 10 in)
- Position: Defender

Team information
- Current team: Szigetszentmiklós
- Number: 24

Senior career*
Years	Team	Apps	(Gls)
2002–2003	Siófok	17	(1)
2003–2008	MTK	105	(3)
2008–2013	Újpest	103	(2)
2013–	Szigetszentmiklós	12	(0)

International career^{‡}
2004	Hungary	2	(1)
- * Club domestic league appearances and goals as of 1 March 2014 ‡ National team caps and goals as of 17 January 2010

Zoltán Pollák (born 13 January 1984) is a Hungarian international footballer currently playing for Szigetszentmiklósi TK.

He plays defender both for his country and his club Újpest FC, which he joined from his previous club, BFC Siófok.

He made his international debut against Estonia on 2 December 2004.
