= Zoltán Végh =

Hungarian footballer

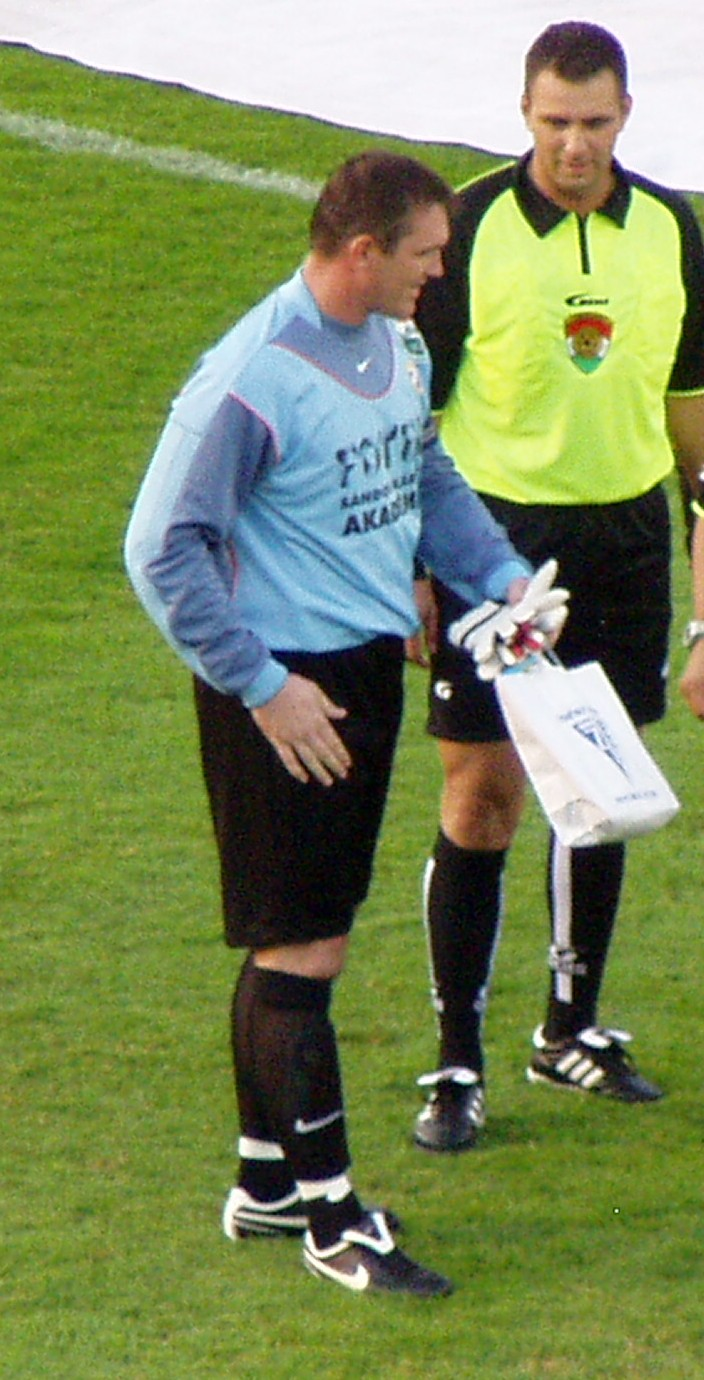

Personal information
- Date of birth: 7 April 1971 (age 55)
- Place of birth: Veszprém, Hungary
- Height: 1.86 m (6 ft 1 in)
- Position: Goalkeeper

Senior career*
Years	Team	Apps	(Gls)
1989–1991	FC Veszprém	53	(0)
1991–1995	Győri ETO FC	114	(0)
1995–1996	Hapoel Haifa	30	(0)
1996–1997	BVSC	30	(0)
1997–2000	Vasas SC	83	(0)
2000–2001	MTK Budapest	1	(0)
2001–2003	Videoton FCF	63	(0)
2003–2009	MTK Budapest	180	(0)
2009–2011	Újpest FC	0	(0)
2009–2010	→ Vasas SC (loan)	45	(0)
2011–2012	Ferencvárosi TC	1	(0)
Total		600	(0)

International career^{‡}
1991–2007	Hungary	25	(0)
- * Club domestic league appearances and goals as of 28 June 2012 ‡ National team caps and goals as of 28 March 2007

Zoltán Végh (born 7 April 1971) is a Hungarian former professional goalkeeper who last played for Ferencvárosi TC.

He was the first-choice goalkeeper for Hungary for several years in the late 1990s, but no longer figures in the national team setup.

== Honours ==
=== Club Honours ===
- Hungarian League: 2008
  - Runner-up: 2007
- Hungarian Cup
  - Runners-up: 1997, 2000

=== Personal Honours ===
- Hungarian League Goalkeeper of the Year: 2006
