= József Kanta =

Hungarian footballer

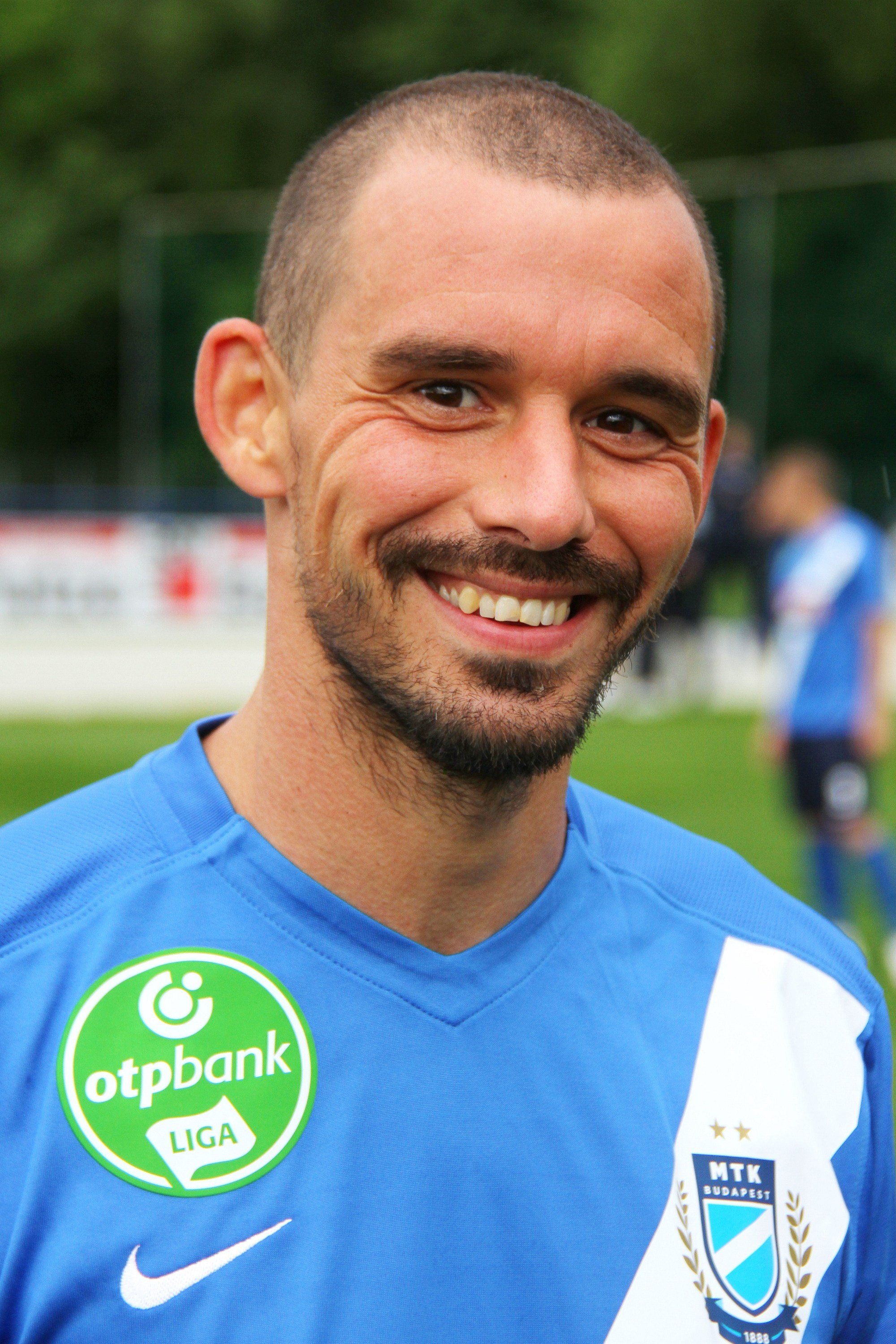
- Kanta with MTK Budapest in 2016

Personal information
- Date of birth: 24 March 1984 (age 42)
- Place of birth: Keszthely, Hungary
- Height: 1.70 m (5 ft 7 in)
- Position: Midfielder

Team information
- Current team: MTK Budapest (U19 coach)

Senior career*
Years	Team	Apps	(Gls)
2001–2021	MTK Budapest	377	(122)
2002–2004	→ Siófok (loan)	58	(48)

International career
1998–1999	Hungary U14	3	(1)
1999–2000	Hungary U15	12	(2)
- Hungary U16
2007–2013	Hungary	3	(0)

Managerial career
- 2021–: MTK Budapest (U19)
- * Club domestic league appearances and goals

József Kanta (born 24 March 1984) is a Hungarian professional football coach and a former player. He is the coach of the Under-19 squad of MTK Budapest. He represented the Hungary national football team. He won the first of his two caps against Cyprus on 6 February 2007.

In 2006, he got the Ferenc Puskás prize and, in 2008, he got the József Bozsik prize from the Hungarian Football Federation.

== Honours ==
MTK Hungária FC

- Hungarian League: 2008
  - Runner-up: 2007
- Ferenc Puskás prize: 2006
- József Bozsik prize: 2008

== Career statistics ==
Appearances and goals by club, season and competition
Club	Season	League			Cup		League Cup		Europe		Total	
Club	Season	Division	Apps	Goals	Apps	Goals	Apps	Goals	Apps	Goals	Apps	Goals
Siófok
Siófok	2002–03	Nemzeti Bajnokság III	29	24	3	2	—		—		32	26
Siófok	2003–04	Nemzeti Bajnokság II	29	24	5	1	0	0	0	0	34	25
Siófok	Total		58	48	8	3	—		—		66	51
MTK Budapest
MTK Budapest	2004–05	Nemzeti Bajnokság I	28	8	2	0	—		—		30	8
MTK Budapest	2005–06	Nemzeti Bajnokság I	24	18	?	?	—		—		24	18
MTK Budapest	2006–07	Nemzeti Bajnokság I	27	16	5	6	—		—		32	22
MTK Budapest	2007–08	Nemzeti Bajnokság I	26	12	0	0	6	3	2	0	34	15
MTK Budapest	2008–09	Nemzeti Bajnokság I	6	5	3	0	1	0	0	0	10	5
MTK Budapest	2009–10	Nemzeti Bajnokság I	3	0	0	0	0	0	—		3	0
MTK Budapest	2010–11	Nemzeti Bajnokság I	27	4	5	1	—		—		32	5
MTK Budapest	2011–12	Nemzeti Bajnokság II	27	8	8	5	6	0	—		41	13
MTK Budapest	2012–13	Nemzeti Bajnokság I	26	9	0	0	2	0	2	1	30	10
MTK Budapest	2013–14	Nemzeti Bajnokság I	27	10	7	5	1	0	—		35	15
MTK Budapest	2014–15	Nemzeti Bajnokság I	29	8	4	3	5	1	—		38	12
MTK Budapest	2015–16	Nemzeti Bajnokság I	27	7	2	0	—		2	0	31	7
MTK Budapest	2016–17	Nemzeti Bajnokság I	32	3	1	0	—		4	0	37	3
MTK Budapest	2017–18	Nemzeti Bajnokság II	25	6	4	3	—		—		29	9
MTK Budapest	2018–19	Nemzeti Bajnokság I	27	6	3	1	—		—		30	7
MTK Budapest	2019–20	Nemzeti Bajnokság II	11	2	7	1	—		—		18	3
MTK Budapest	2020–21	Nemzeti Bajnokság II	5	0	5	1	—		—		10	1
MTK Budapest	Total		377	122	56	26	21	4	10	1	464	133
Career total			435	170	64	26	21	4	10	1	530	183

Updated to games played as of 15 May 2021.
