= Zoltán Szatmári =

Hungarian footballer

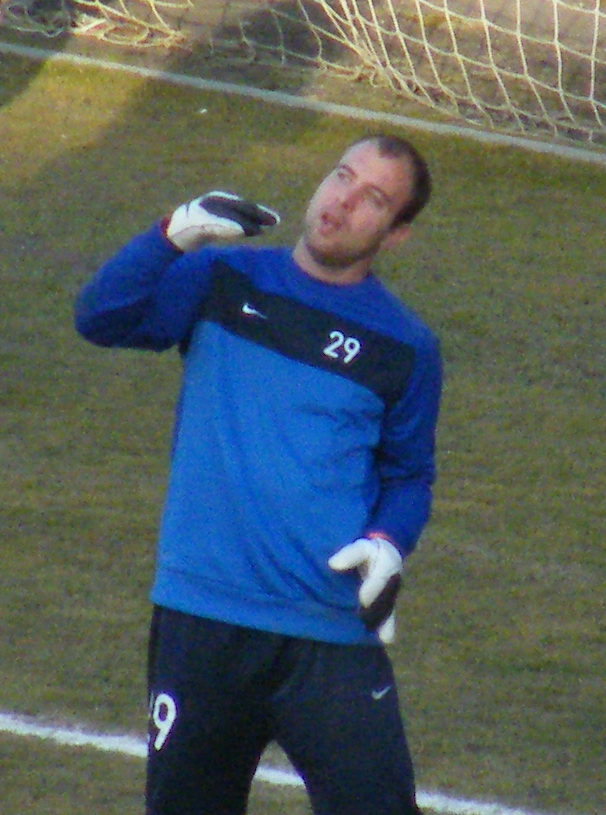

Personal information
- Full name: Zoltán Attila Szatmári
- Date of birth: 2 May 1979 (age 47)
- Place of birth: Budapest, Hungary
- Height: 1.84 m (6 ft 0 in)
- Position: Goalkeeper

Team information
- Current team: ETO Győr
- Number: 1

Senior career*
Years	Team	Apps	(Gls)
2002–2004	Dabas	18	(0)
2004–2011	MTK	40	(0)
2011–2012	Siófok	1	(0)
2012	Lyngby	1	(0)
2012	Siófok	4	(0)
2012–2013	Vasas	26	(0)
2013–2015	Jászberény	42	(0)
2015–2016	III. Kerület	30	(0)
2016–2017	Tatabánya	18	(0)
2017	Komárom	15	(0)
2017–2018	ETO Győr	17	(0)
- * Club domestic league appearances and goals as of 19 November 2017

Zoltán Szatmári (born 2 May 1979 in Budapest) is a Hungarian football player who plays for Győri ETO FC.
