= Ádám Hrepka =

Hungarian footballer

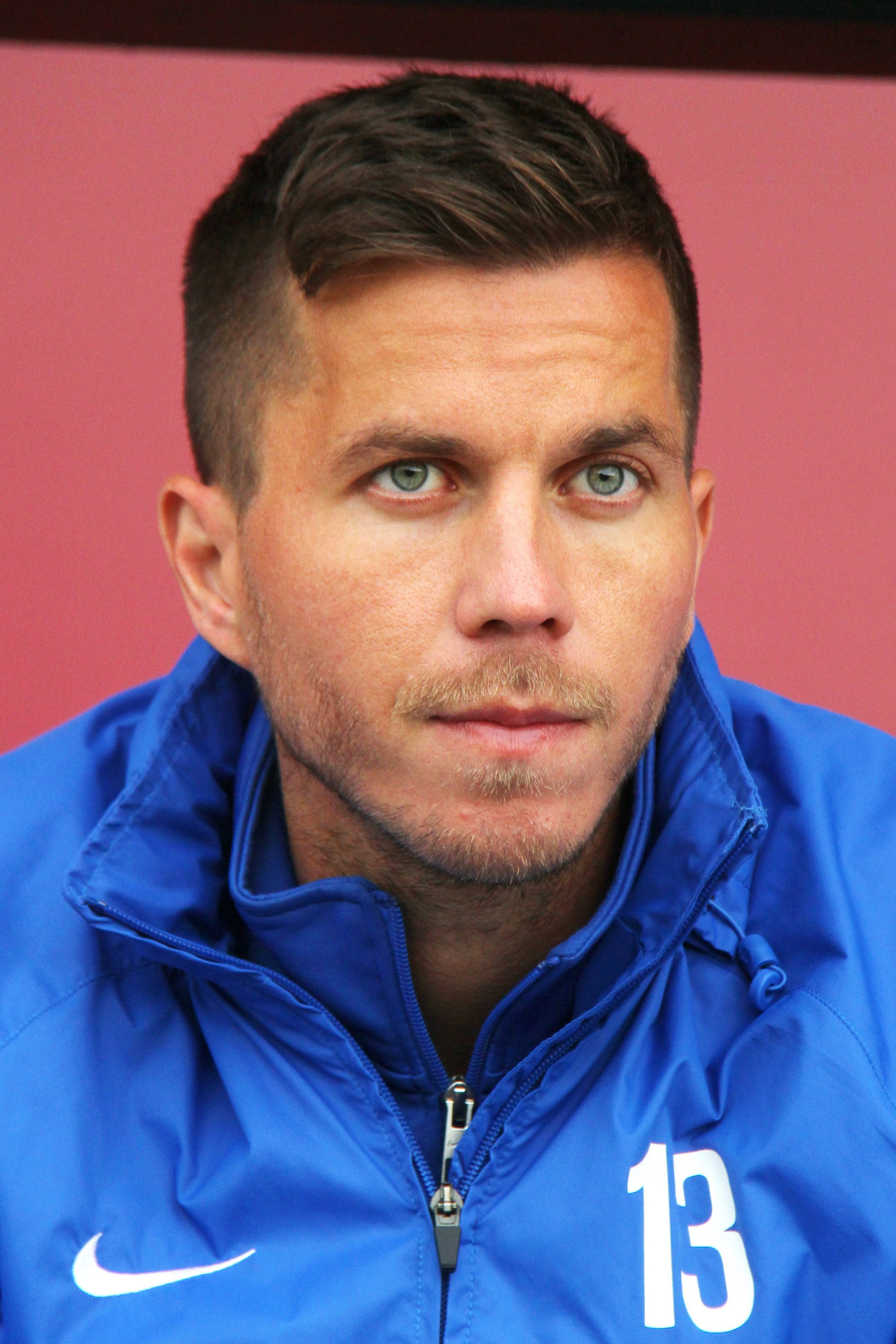
- Hrepka with MTK Budapest in 2016

Personal information
- Date of birth: 15 April 1987 (age 39)
- Place of birth: Szeged, Hungary
- Height: 1.83 m (6 ft 0 in)
- Position: Forward

Youth career
- 1996–2001: Szeged
- 2001–2004: Újpest

Senior career*
Years	Team	Apps	(Gls)
2004–2012	MTK	114	(32)
2007	→ NEC (loan)	7	(0)
2009–2010	→ Budapest Honvéd (loan)	13	(5)
2010	→ Vasas (loan)	19	(4)
2011–2012	→ Paks (loan)	23	(7)
2012–2013	Bnei Yehuda	29	(8)
2013–2014	Haladás	10	(2)
2014–2018	MTK	70	(14)
2018–2019	Vasas	19	(1)
2019–2020	Monor	8	(3)
2020–2021	Budapesti VSC	25	(8)

International career
2006–2007	Hungary	3	(0)
- * Club domestic league appearances and goals

Ádám Hrepka (born 15 April 1987) is a Hungarian former football player. He is a striker and has also played for the Hungary national team.

== Club career ==
Born in Szeged, Csongrád in Southern Hungary, Hrepka was with local side Szeged, before joining Újpest where he stayed until 2004 as a youth player. In 2004, he joined Hungarian National Championship I side MTK Hungária, making nine appearances and scoring two goals in his first season. In 2005–06 he scored twelve goals in 24 appearances, and a further 11 goals in 27 appearances the following season as MTK finished as runners-up in the league.

He spent a short time in 2007–08 on loan at Dutch Eredivisie club, NEC, making seven appearances. He also made 17 appearances back at MTK, scoring twice, as the club won the league title. He then made 27 appearances, scoring five goals in 2008–09. On 8 October 2008 he scored all four goals in MTK's 4–2 victory over Kaposvári Rákóczi in the 1st leg and added two more in the 6–1 win in the 2nd leg of their Hungarian Cup, Round 5 tie.

In the 2009–10 season Hrepka was loaned to Budapest Honvéd. In late-January 2010, during the league's winter break, he was linked with a move to English Championship club Blackpool. MTK confirmed on 24 January on the club's official website that Hrepka had travelled to Blackpool to discuss a possible move.

== International career ==
Hrekpa has made three appearances for Hungary.

== Honours ==
MTK Hungária

- Hungarian National Championship I champion: 2007–08
- Hungarian National Championship I runner-up: 2006–07
