= István Rodenbücher =

Hungarian footballer

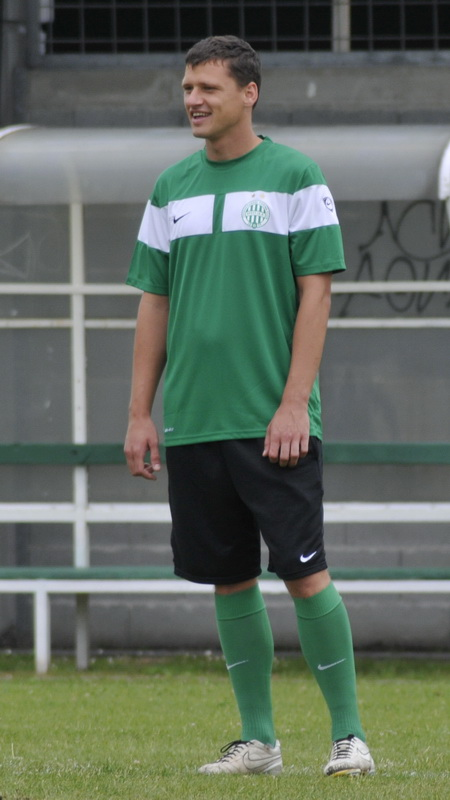

Personal information
- Full name: István Rodenbücher
- Date of birth: 22 February 1984 (age 42)
- Place of birth: Szekszárd, Hungary
- Height: 1.84 m (6 ft 0 in)
- Position: Centre back

Team information
- Current team: Gárdony VSC

Youth career
- Németkér
- Szekszárd
- Györköny

Senior career*
Years	Team	Apps	(Gls)
1997–2010	MTK	109	(3)
2002–2004	→ Siófok (loan)	31	(2)
2010–2011	Ferencváros	20	(2)
2011–2014	Pápa	60	(0)
2014–2015	MTK	6	(0)
2015–2016	Paks	14	(0)
2016–2017	SZTK	?	(?)
2017–	Gárdony VSC	?	(?)

International career
1998–1999	Hungary U-14	2	(0)
1999–2000	Hungary U-15	6	(0)
1999–2000	Hungary U-16	11	(1)
2006–2007	Hungary	2	(0)
- * Club domestic league appearances and goals

István Rodenbücher (born 22 February 1984) is a Hungarian football player of German origin who currently plays for Gárdony VSC.
