= 2008–09 MTK Budapest FC season =

MTK Budapest
2008–09 season
- Chairman: Gábor Várszegi
- Manager: József Garami
- Stadium: Hidegkuti Nándor Stadion; Promontor utcai Stadion (Note: Played the last three Ligakupa match.); Szusza Ferenc Stadium (Note: Played the Champions League qualifying matches.)
- Nemzeti Bajnokság I: 7th
- Magyar Kupa: Semi-finals
- Ligakupa: Group stage
- Szuperkupa: Winners
- UEFA Champions League: Second qualifying round
- Top goalscorer: League: Gábor Urbán (7); All: Ádám Hrepka (12)
- Average home league attendance: 940
- Biggest win: 6–1 vs Kaposvár (H) (15 October 2008); Magyar Kupa
- Biggest defeat: 1–8 vs Siófok (H) (21 October 2008); Ligakupa

The 2008–09 season was MTK Budapest Football Club's 100nd competitive season, 14th consecutive season in the Nemzeti Bajnokság I and 120nd year in existence as a football club. In addition to the domestic league, MTK Budapest participated in this season's editions of the Magyar kupa, Ligakupa, Szuperkupa and UEFA Champions League, entering the competition after 5 years. The season covered the period from 25 July 2008 to 30 May 2009.

== First team squad ==
Note: Flags indicate national team as defined under FIFA eligibility rules; some limited exceptions apply. Players may hold more than one non-FIFA nationality.

No.	Pos.	Nation	Player
1	GK	HUN	Zoltán Végh (captain)
2	MF	HUN	Máté Pátkai
3	DF	HUN	Adrián Szekeres
4	DF	HUN	Dániel Vadnai
5	MF	HUN	Sándor Hajdú
6	MF	HUN	Ádám Szabó
7	DF	HUN	Sándor Hidvégi
8	MF	HUN	Tamás Kecskés
9	FW	HUN	András Pál
11	MF	HUN	Vilmos Melczer
12	FW	HUN	László Lencse
13	FW	HUN	Ádám Hrepka
14	MF	HUN	Attila Busai
15	MF	HUN	Norbert Könyves

No.	Pos.	Nation	Player
16	MF	HUN	Gábor Nagy
17	FW	HUN	László Zsidai
18	DF	HUN	Endre Bajúsz
19	MF	HUN	József Kanta
20	DF	MNE	Mladen Lambulić
21	DF	HUN	András Vági
22	DF	HUN	István Rodenbücher
23	DF	MNE	Marko Radulović
25	MF	HUN	Márk Nikházi
27	MF	HUN	Ádám Pintér
28	FW	HUN	Gábor Urbán
29	GK	HUN	Zoltán Szatmári
30	MF	HUN	András Gosztonyi
31	FW	HUN	Marcell Molnár

== Transfers ==
=== Summer ===
In: Note: Flags indicate national team as defined under FIFA eligibility rules; some limited exceptions apply. Players may hold more than one non-FIFA nationality.

No.	Pos.	Nation	Player
4	DF	HUN	Béla Balogh (loan return from (England) Colchester United)
5	MF	HUN	Róbert Kis (loan return from Soroksár)
16	MF	HUN	Gábor Nagy (from Haladás)
21	DF	HUN	Gábor Bori (loan return from (England) Leicester City)
23	DF	MNE	Marko Radulović (from (Montenegro) Petrovac)
25	FW	HUN	Márk Nikházi (from MTK Budapest U19)
30	MF	HUN	András Gosztonyi (from MTK Budapest U19)

Out: Note: Flags indicate national team as defined under FIFA eligibility rules; some limited exceptions apply. Players may hold more than one non-FIFA nationality.

No.	Pos.	Nation	Player
4	DF	HUN	Béla Balogh (loan to (Spain) Real Murcia)
7	FW	HUN	Tamás Kulcsár (loan to Fehérvár)
21	DF	HUN	Gábor Bori (loan to Újpest)
24	DF	HUN	Zoltán Pollák (to Újpest)

=== Winter ===
In: Note: Flags indicate national team as defined under FIFA eligibility rules; some limited exceptions apply. Players may hold more than one non-FIFA nationality.

No.	Pos.	Nation	Player
7	DF	HUN	Sándor Hidvégi (from Jászberény)
15	MF	HUN	Norbert Könyves (from MTK Budapest II)
31	FW	HUN	Marcell Molnár (from MTK Budapest II)

Out: Note: Flags indicate national team as defined under FIFA eligibility rules; some limited exceptions apply. Players may hold more than one non-FIFA nationality.

No.	Pos.	Nation	Player
5	DF	HUN	Ádám Présinger (loan to Pécs)
15	MF	HUN	Levente Horváth (to Paks)

== Competitions ==
=== Overview ===
Competition	First match	Last match	Starting round	Final position	Record							
Competition	First match	Last match	Starting round	Final position	Pld	W	D	L	GF	GA	GD	Win %
Nemzeti Bajnokság I	25 July 2008	30 May 2009	Matchday 1	7th	30	13	6	11	43	41	+2	43.33
Magyar Kupa	23 September 2008	22 April 2009	Round of 32	Semi-finals	7	3	2	2	19	13	+6	42.86
Ligakupa	1 October 2008	7 February 2009	Group stage	Group stage	10	4	3	3	13	17	−4	40.00
Hungarian Super Cup	20 July 2008		Final	Winners	1	0	1	0	0	0	+0	0.00
UEFA Champions League	30 July 2008	6 August 2008	Second qualifying round	Second qualifying round	2	0	0	2	0	7	−7	0.00
Total					50	20	12	18	75	78	−3	40.00

Source: Competitions

=== Nemzeti Bajnokság I ===
==== League table ====
Pos	Team	Pld	W	D	L	GF	GA	GD	Pts
5	Kecskemét	30	14	6	10	55	44	+11	48
6	Fehérvár	30	14	6	10	42	34	+8	48
7	MTK Budapest	30	13	6	11	43	41	+2	45
8	Győr	30	11	10	9	57	41	+16	43
9	Kaposvár	30	11	7	12	51	46	+5	40

Source: soccerway.com
Rules for classification: 1st points; 2nd overall wins; 3rd goal difference; 4th goals scored

==== Results summary ====
Overall								Home						Away					
Pld	W	D	L	GF	GA	GD	Pts	W	D	L	GF	GA	GD	W	D	L	GF	GA	GD
30	13	6	11	43	41	+2	45	6	2	7	19	24	−5	7	4	4	24	17	+7

Source: Hungarian Football Federation

==== Results by round ====
Round	1	2	3	4	5	6	7	8	9	10	11	12	13	14	15	16	17	18	19	20	21	22	23	24	25	26	27	28	29	30
Ground	A	H	A	A	H	A	H	A	H	A	H	A	H	A	H	H	A	H	H	A	H	A	H	A	H	A	H	A	H	A
Result	L	D	W	W	W	L	D	W	L	L	W	D	L	D	L	W	W	W	W	W	L	L	L	D	W	W	L	D	L	W
Position	16	14	7	4	3	5	5	5	6	9	7	8	9	10	10	9	7	5	5	4	5	5	5	5	5	5	6	7	8	7

Source: Matches
A = Away; H = Home; W = Win; D = Draw; L = Loss

==== Matches ====
25 July 2008 1	Kaposvár	3–1	MTK Budapest	Kaposvár
19:00 CEST (UTC+2)	Zahorecz 31' (pen.), 35' (pen.); Božović 41'	Report	Bori 85'	Stadium: Rákóczi Stadion; Attendance: 3,000; Referee: Zsolt Szabó

3 August 2008 2	MTK Budapest	1–1	Budapest Honvéd	Budapest
20:00 CEST (UTC+2)	Pál 33'; Pintér (yellow card) 63'	Report	Hercegfalvi 23'; Smiljanić (yellow card) 33'; Gebro (yellow card) 45'; Genito (yellow card) 89'	Stadium: Hidegkuti Nándor Stadion; Attendance: 1,500; Referee: István Mészáros

9 August 2008 3	Vasas	0–4	MTK Budapest	Budapest
20:00 CEST (UTC+2)		Report	Urbán 8'; Pál 30'; Lambulić (red card) 37'; Kecskés 52'; Hrepka 74'	Stadium: Stadion Rudolf Illovszky; Attendance: 3,000; Referee: Sándor Andó-Szabó

16 August 2008 4	Diósgyőr	2–3	MTK Budapest	Miskolc
20:00 CEST (UTC+2)	Mihály Tóth 10'; Miličić 79'	Report	G. Nagy 3'; Pátkai 60'; Miličić 62' (o.g.)	Stadium: Diósgyőri Stadion; Attendance: 7,800; Referee: Roland Veizer

23 August 2008 5	MTK Budapest	3–2	Paks	Budapest
20:00 CEST (UTC+2)	Pál 23', 90'; Lencse 86'	Report	Tököli 28'; Tamás Kiss 81'	Stadium: Hidegkuti Nándor Stadion; Attendance: 500; Referee: Ferenc Bede

29 August 2008 6	Zalaegerszeg	3–1	MTK Budapest	Zalaegerszeg
19:00 CEST (UTC+2)	Méyé 45'; Balázs 48'; Hajdú 51'	Report	Pál 80'	Stadium: ZTE Arena; Attendance: 1,200; Referee: Péter Solymosi

13 September 2008 7	MTK Budapest	1–1	Győr	Budapest
15:00 CEST (UTC+2)	Lambulić (pen.), 49'	Report	Zoltán Kovács 34'	Stadium: Hidegkuti Nándor Stadion; Attendance: 1,200; Referee: Zoltán Iványi

19 September 2008 8	Fehérvár	0–2	MTK Budapest	Székesfehérvár
19:00 CEST (UTC+2)		Report	Lambulić 66'; Á. Szabó 49'	Stadium: Sóstói Stadion; Attendance: 1,500; Referee: Tamás Bognár

28 September 2008 9	MTK Budapest	1–2	Nyíregyháza	Budapest
17:30 CEST (UTC+2)	Urbán 44'	Report	Apostu 33' (pen.); Stojkov 47'	Stadium: Hidegkuti Nándor Stadion; Attendance: 700; Referee: Ádám Németh

4 October 2008 10	Újpest	4–1	MTK Budapest	Budapest
15:00 CEST (UTC+2)	Božić 19', 58'; Bori 51'; Kabát 90+1'	Report	G. Nagy 84'	Stadium: Szusza Ferenc Stadium; Attendance: 4,289; Referee: Péter Solymosi

18 October 2008 11	MTK Budapest	2–1	Siófok	Budapest
18:00 CEST (UTC+2)	Hrepka 85'; Lencse 90'	Report	Sütő (red card) 53'; Ndjodo 62'	Stadium: Hidegkuti Nándor Stadion; Attendance: 500; Referee: Viktor Kassai

25 October 2008 12	Haladás	0–0	MTK Budapest	Szombathely
17:00 CEST (UTC+2)	P. Tóth (red card) 89'	Report		Stadium: Rohonci Street Stadium; Attendance: 6,000; Referee: Zsolt Szabó

2 November 2008 13	MTK Budapest	0–1	Debrecen	Budapest
18:00 CET (UTC+1)	Rodenbücher (red card) 89'	Report	Kiss 84'	Stadium: Hidegkuti Nándor Stadion; Attendance: 1,200; Referee: Mihály Fábián

8 November 2008 14	Kecskemét	0–0	MTK Budapest	Kecskemét
15:00 CET (UTC+1)	Čukić (red card) 68'	Report		Stadium: Széktói Stadion; Attendance: 3,500; Referee: Roland Veizer

15 November 2008 15	MTK Budapest	0–2	Rákospalota	Budapest
15:00 CET (UTC+1)		Report	Nyerges 47'; Kiss 76'	Stadium: Hidegkuti Nándor Stadion; Attendance: 1,000; Referee: István Vad

21 February 2009 16	MTK Budapest	2–1	Kaposvár	Budapest
17:00 CET (UTC+1)	Hrepka 51'; Kanta 59'	Report	Zahorecz 66' (pen.)	Stadium: Hidegkuti Nándor Stadion; Attendance: 1,000; Referee: Ádám Farkas

5 May 2009 17	Budapest Honvéd	0–3	MTK Budapest	Budapest
19:00 CEST (UTC+2)	Debreceni (yellow card) 17'; Filó (yellow card) 58'; Fazakas (yellow card) 69'	Report	Lencse (yellow card) 16'; Urbán 77', 90+4'; Hrepka 82'	Stadium: Bozsik Stadion; Attendance: 1,100; Referee: István Vad

7 March 2009 18	MTK Budapest	3–0	Vasas	Budapest
15:00 CET (UTC+1)	Kanta 49' (pen.); Urbán 86'; Hrepka 89'	Report	Laczkó (red card) 36'; Paripovic (red card) 71'	Stadium: Hidegkuti Nándor Stadion; Attendance: 1,200; Referee: Mihály Fábián

15 March 2009 19	MTK Budapest	2–0	Diósgyőr	Budapest
17:30 CET (UTC+1)	Kanta 4' (pen.); Zsidai 16'	Report		Stadium: Hidegkuti Nándor Stadion; Attendance: 800; Referee: Zoltán Iványi

21 March 2009 20	Paks	0–1	MTK Budapest	Paks
18:00 CET (UTC+1)		Report	Kanta 90'	Stadium: Fehérvári úti Stadion; Attendance: 1,253; Referee: József Berger

4 April 2009 21	MTK Budapest	0–2	Zalaegerszeg	Budapest
19:00 CEST (UTC+2)		Report	Alomerović 50'; Sluka 65'	Stadium: Hidegkuti Nándor Stadion; Attendance: 800; Referee: István Vad

10 April 2009 22	Győr	3–1	MTK Budapest	Győr
19:00 CEST (UTC+2)	Brnović 40', 63', 66'	Report	Kanta 84' (pen.)	Stadium: ETO Park; Referee: Viktor Kassai

17 April 2009 23	MTK Budapest	0–4	Fehérvár	Budapest
19:00 CEST (UTC+2)	Pintér (red card) 51'	Report	Szakály 44'; Vujović 53', 76', 87'	Stadium: Hidegkuti Nándor Stadion; Attendance: 600; Referee: Mihály Fábián

25 April 2009 24	Nyíregyháza	0–0	MTK Budapest	Nyíregyháza
19:00 CEST (UTC+2)	Mboussi (red card) 74'	Report		Stadium: Városi Stadion; Attendance: 5,000; Referee: Ferenc Bede

29 April 2009 25	MTK Budapest	3–2	Újpest	Budapest
18:00 CEST (UTC+2)	Pátkai 42', 78'; Urbán 88'	Report	Korcsmár 45'; Tisza 46'	Stadium: Hidegkuti Nándor Stadion; Attendance: 2,000; Referee: Zoltán Iványi

2 May 2009 26	Siófok	0–1	MTK Budapest	Siófok
19:00 CEST (UTC+2)		Report	Lencse 90+1'	Stadium: Révész Street Stadium; Attendance: 900; Referee: József Berger

8 May 2009 27	MTK Budapest	0–1	Haladás	Budapest
19:00 CEST (UTC+2)		Report	Kenesei 26'	Stadium: Hidegkuti Nándor Stadion; Attendance: 500; Referee: Ferenc Bede

17 May 2009 28	Debrecen	2–2	MTK Budapest	Debrecen
17:30 CEST (UTC+2)	Leandro 57'; Mészáros 82'	Report	Pátkai 71'; Szekeres 90+3'	Stadium: Stadion Oláh Gábor Út; Attendance: 7,000; Referee: Zsolt Szabó

23 May 2009 29	MTK Budapest	1–4	Kecskemét	Budapest
19:00 CEST (UTC+2)	Pátkai 76'	Report	Csordás 25'; Farkas 29'; Savić 43'; Montvai 55'	Stadium: Hidegkuti Nándor Stadion; Attendance: 600; Referee: Ádám Németh

30 May 2009 30	Rákospalota	0–4	MTK Budapest	Budapest
19:00 CEST (UTC+2)		Report	Hidvégi 35'; Urbán 37'; Pátkai 69'; Tischler 86'	Stadium: Stadion Budai II. Laszló; Attendance: 620; Referee: Zoltán Iványi

=== Magyar Kupa ===
23 September 2008 Round of 32	Kozármisleny	2–2 (a.e.t.) (1–4 p)	MTK Budapest	Kozármisleny
16:00 CEST (UTC+2)	Laki 88'; Müller 110'	Report	Pátkai (yellow card) 10', (goal) 98'; Lambulić 75'	Stadium: Alkotmány tér stadion Attendance: 1,000; Referee: Gábor Oláh
	Penalties
	I. Tóth (penalty scored); Müller (penalty missed); Kutyáncsánin (penalty missed)		(penalty scored) Pintér; (penalty scored) Gosztonyi; (penalty scored) Lambulić; (penalty scored) Urbán
Note: MTK Budapest won on penalty kicks 4–1.

Round of 16

8 October 2008 First leg	Kaposvár	2–4	MTK Budapest	Kaposvár
17:00 CEST (UTC+2)	Zahorecz (yellow card) 20'; Božović 24'; Petrók 33', (yellow card) 52'; Gujić (yellow card) 34'	Report	G. Nagy (yellow card) 14'; Hrepka (yellow card) 31', (goal) 43', 50', 59'; Gosztonyi 61'	Stadium: Rákóczi Stadion; Referee: József Berger

21 October 2008 Second leg	MTK Budapest	6–1 (10–3 agg.)	Kaposvár	Budapest
17:00 CEST (UTC+2)	Kecskés 21'; Hrepka 53', 89'; G. Nagy 64', 85'; Lencse 88'	Report	Božović 83'	Stadium: Hidegkuti Nándor Stadion; Referee: Gábor Kovács
Note: MTK Budapest won 10-3 on aggregate.

Quarter-finals

11 March 2009 First leg	MTK Budapest	1–2	Újpest	Budapest
18:00 CET (UTC+1)	Vadnai (yellow card) 15'; Pintér (red card) 26'; Zsidai (yellow card) 53'; Lencse 66'	Report	Kabát 26' (pen.); A. Simon 38'; Remili (yellow card) 55'; Ćutuk (yellow card) 69'; Malone (yellow card) 71'; Stokes (yellow card) 89'	Stadium: Hidegkuti Nándor Stadion; Attendance: 2,000; Referee: Tamás Bognár

17 March 2009 Second leg	Újpest	2–3 (4–4 (a) agg.)	MTK Budapest	Budapest
	A. Simon 19', 35'; Kéthévoama (yellow card) 56'; Gaucho (yellow card) 82'; Korcsmár (yellow card) 90'	Report	Lencse 36'; Kanta (yellow card) 55'; Hrepka 76'; Lambulić (yellow card) 81'; Á. Szabó 85', (red card) 86'	Stadium: Szusza Ferenc Stadium; Attendance: 2,373; Referee: Péter Solymosi
Note: 4–4 on aggregate. MTK Budapest won on away goals.

Semi-finals

22 April 2009 First leg	Győr	2–1	MTK Budapest	Győr
18:00 CEST (UTC+2)	Bajzát 25'; Tokody 34'	Report	Lencse 20'; Zsidai (yellow card) 27'; Melczer (yellow card) 36'; Radulović (yellow card) 74'	Stadium: ETO Park; Attendance: 2,000; Referee: Tamás Arany

22 April 2009 Second leg	MTK Budapest	2–2 (3–4 agg.)	Győr	Budapest
17:00 CEST (UTC+2)	Könyves 16'; Á. Szabó (yellow card) 38'; Pintér (yellow card) 67', (goal) 80'	Report	Böőr 38'; Völgyi (yellow card) 45'; Stanišić (yellow card) 47'; Šupić (yellow card) 84'; Stark 87'	Stadium: Hidegkuti Nándor Stadion; Attendance: 1,000; Referee: Zsolt Szabó
Note: Győr won 4-3 on aggregate.

=== Ligakupa ===
==== Group stage ====
Pos	Team	Pld	W	D	L	GF	GA	GD	Pts	Qualification	HAL	GYO	MTK	SIO	BUD	PAP
1	Haladás	10	7	1	2	23	10	+13	22	Advance to knockout phase	—	2–0	2–0	3–0	3–0	5–2
2	Győr	10	5	1	4	23	19	+4	16	Advance to knockout phase	4–0	—	1–1	3–0	6–0	0–4
3	MTK	10	4	3	3	13	17	−4	15		0–0	3–0	—	1–8	1–2	2–1
4	Siófok	10	4	2	4	20	16	+4	14		2–1	4–2	1–2	—	1–2	2–2
5	Budaörs	10	3	1	6	10	22	−12	10		2–5	0–1	0–1	0–2	—	3–1
6	Pápa	10	1	4	5	18	23	−5	7		0–2	5–6	2–2	0–0	1–1	—

Source: HFF

1 October 2008 1	Pápa	2–2	MTK Budapest	Pápa
17:30 CEST (UTC+2)	Germán 45'; Imrik 54'; G. Tóth (yellow card) 87'	Report	Hauser (yellow card) 23'; Bajúsz 61'; Nikházi 65'; Gosztonyi (yellow card) 65'; Kis (yellow card) 81'	Stadium: Stadion Várkerti; Referee: Tamás Arany

15 October 2008 2	MTK Budapest	1–8	Siófok	Budapest
15:00 CEST (UTC+2)	Nikházi 72'	Report	Takács 4'; Magasföldi 35', 41'; Ndjodo 44'; Fülöp 49', 80'; Gajda 52', 75'	Stadium: Hidegkuti Nándor Stadion; Attendance: 150; Referee: Gergely Szőts

29 October 2008 3	Győr	1–1	MTK Budapest	Győr
14:00 CET (UTC+1)	Brnović 52'; Z. Kovács (yellow card) 74'	Report	Lencse (yellow card) 47'; Szatmári (yellow card) 52'; Ladányi 74'	Stadium: ETO Park; Referee: Krisztián Pánczél

5 November 2008 4	MTK Budapest	1–2	Budaörs	Budapest
13:30 CET (UTC+1)	Lencse (red card) 40'; Nikházi 45'; Gál (yellow card) 85'	Report	Mihályi (yellow card) 12'; Farkas 23'; D. Varga 34', (yellow card) 40'; Csengő (yellow card) 75'; Lászka (yellow card) 90'	Stadium: Hidegkuti Nándor Stadion; Referee: Gyöngyi Gaál

12 November 2008 5	Haladás	2–0	MTK Budapest	Szombathely
15:30 CET (UTC+1)	N. Tóth 23'; Maikel 44'; Á. Simon (yellow card) 60'; Iszlai (yellow card) 87'	Report	Présinger (yellow card) 43'; L. Szabó (yellow card) 61'; Kornis (red card) 72'; Radulović (yellow card) 87'	Stadium: Rohonci Street Stadium; Referee: Tamás Arany

23 November 2008 6	MTK Budapest	2–1	Pápa	Budapest
13:00 CET (UTC+1)	Szekeres 80'; Gál 87'	Report	Sipos (yellow card) 39'; Gyömbér 72'; Szabó (yellow card) 89'	Stadium: Promontor utcai Stadion; Referee: Ádám Farkas

29 November 2008 7	Siófok	1–2	MTK Budapest	Siófok
13:00 CET (UTC+1)	Tusori 57'	Report	Molnár (yellow card) 16'; Rodenbücher 50'; Kis 70'	Stadium: Révész Street Stadium; Referee: József Berger

6 December 2008 8	MTK Budapest	3–0	Győr	Budapest
13:00 CET (UTC+1)	Hrepka 35'; Hidvégi 53'; Gosztonyi 84'	Report		Stadium: Promontor utcai Stadion; Referee: Róbert Nagy

7 February 2009 9	Budaörs	0–1	MTK Budapest	Budaörs
14:00 CET (UTC+1)	Farkas (yellow card) 57'; D. Varga (yellow card) 68'	Report	Könyves 72'	Stadium: Városi Stadion; Referee: László Varga

22 January 2009 10	MTK Budapest	0–0	Haladás	Budapest
13:00 CET (UTC+1)	Á. Szabó (yellow card) 68'	Report		Stadium: Promontor utcai Stadion; Referee: Gergő Király

=== Szuperkupa ===
20 July 2008 Final	Debrecen	0–0 (a.e.t.) (2–3 p)	MTK Budapest	Debrecen
	Komlósi (yellow card) 22'; Szakály (yellow card) 40'; Huszák (yellow card) 64'; Kiss (yellow card) 114'; Kerekes (yellow card) 117'	Report	G. Nagy (yellow card) 45'; Lambulić (yellow card) 94'	Stadium: Stadion Oláh Gábor Út; Attendance: 5,000; Referee: Ferenc Bede
	Penalties
	Takács (penalty missed); Huszák (penalty scored); Leandro (penalty missed); Rudolf (penalty scored); Kerekes (penalty missed)		(penalty missed) Lambulić; (penalty missed) L. Horváth; (penalty scored) Pátkai; (penalty scored) Pollák; (penalty scored) Zsidai
Note: MTK Budapest won on penalty kicks 3–2.

=== UEFA Champions League ===
Second qualifying round

30 July 2008 First leg	Fenerbahçe (Turkey)	2–0	(Hungary) MTK Budapest	Istanbul, Turkey
21:00 EEST (UTC+3)	Roberto Carlos 15'; Şahin (yellow card) 55', (goal) 58'	Report	Bori (yellow card) 40'; Pollák (yellow card) 62'; Balogh (yellow card) 85'	Stadium: Şükrü Saracoğlu Stadium; Attendance: 33,591; Referee: Serge Gumienny (Belgium)

6 August 2008 Second leg	MTK Budapest (Hungary)	0–5 (0–7 agg.)	(Turkey) Fenerbahçe	Budapest, Hungary
20:45 CEST (UTC+2)	Urbán (yellow card) 23'; Pintér (yellow card) 39'	Report	Şentürk 5', 61', 79', 80'; Gönül (yellow card) 38'; Kazim-Richards (yellow card) 45'; Belözoğlu 66' (pen.); Yılmaz (yellow card) 89'	Stadium: Szusza Ferenc Stadium; Attendance: 2,048; Referee: Martin Atkinson (England)
Note: Fenerbahçe won 7–0 on aggregate.

== Statistics ==
=== Appearances and goals ===
No.	Pos	Nat	Player	Total		Nemzeti Bajnokság I		Magyar Kupa		Ligakupa		Szuperkupa		UEFA Champions League	
No.	Pos	Nat	Player	Apps	Goals	Apps	Goals	Apps	Goals	Apps	Goals	Apps	Goals	Apps	Goals
1	GK	(Hungary) HUN	Zoltán Végh	42	-61	30	-41	7	-13	2	-0	1	-0	2	-7
2	MF	(Hungary) HUN	Máté Pátkai	30	7	23	6	3	1	2	0	1	0	1	0
3	DF	(Hungary) HUN	Adrián Szekeres	21	2	14	1	4	0	3	1	0	0	0	0
4	DF	(Hungary) HUN	Dániel Vadnai	13	0	8	0	4	0	1	0	0	0	0	0
5	MF	(Hungary) HUN	Sándor Hajdú	7	0	1	0	0	0	6	0	0	0	0	0
6	MF	(Hungary) HUN	Ádám Szabó	31	2	21	1	5	1	3	0	1	0	1	0
7	DF	(Hungary) HUN	Sándor Hidvégi	19	2	12	1	2	0	5	1	0	0	0	0
8	MF	(Hungary) HUN	Tamás Kecskés	29	2	19	1	4	1	5	0	1	0	0	0
9	FW	(Hungary) HUN	András Pál	10	5	7	5	0	0	0	0	1	0	2	0
11	MF	(Hungary) HUN	Vilmos Melczer	23	0	18	0	4	0	1	0	0	0	0	0
12	FW	(Hungary) HUN	László Lencse	34	7	22	3	6	4	6	0	0	0	0	0
13	FW	(Hungary) HUN	Ádám Hrepka	38	12	27	5	7	6	3	1	0	0	1	0
14	MF	(Hungary) HUN	Attila Busai	2	0	0	0	0	0	2	0	0	0	0	0
15	MF	(Hungary) HUN	Norbert Könyves	13	2	11	0	1	1	1	1	0	0	0	0
16	MF	(Hungary) HUN	Gábor Nagy	35	4	26	2	6	2	0	0	1	0	2	0
17	MF	(Hungary) HUN	László Zsidai	42	1	29	1	7	0	3	0	1	0	2	0
18	DF	(Hungary) HUN	Endre Bajúsz	8	1	6	0	1	0	1	1	0	0	0	0
19	MF	(Hungary) HUN	József Kanta	10	5	6	5	3	0	1	0	0	0	0	0
20	DF	(Montenegro) MNE	Mladen Lambulić	36	3	24	2	6	1	3	0	1	0	2	0
21	DF	(Hungary) HUN	András Vági	7	0	1	0	0	0	6	0	0	0	0	0
22	DF	(Hungary) HUN	István Rodenbücher	35	1	22	0	7	0	6	1	0	0	0	0
23	DF	(Montenegro) MNE	Marko Radulović	26	0	15	0	4	0	7	0	0	0	0	0
25	MF	(Hungary) HUN	Márk Nikházi	13	3	4	0	1	0	8	3	0	0	0	0
27	MF	(Hungary) HUN	Ádám Pintér	26	1	16	0	5	1	2	0	1	0	2	0
28	FW	(Hungary) HUN	Gábor Urbán	24	7	18	7	3	0	0	0	1	0	2	0
29	GK	(Hungary) HUN	Zoltán Szatmári	5	-15	0	-0	0	-0	5	-15	0	-0	0	-0
30	MF	(Hungary) HUN	András Gosztonyi	21	2	11	0	4	1	6	1	0	0	0	0
31	FW	(Hungary) HUN	Marcell Molnár	9	0	3	0	0	0	6	0	0	0	0	0
Youth players:
1	GK	(Hungary) HUN	Milán Balikó	1	0	0	-0	0	-0	1	-0	0	-0	0	-0
1	GK	(Hungary) HUN	György Scheilinger	1	0	0	-0	0	-0	1	-0	0	-0	0	-0
3	DF	(Hungary) HUN	Imre Tóth	1	0	0	0	0	0	1	0	0	0	0	0
3	MF	(Hungary) HUN	Tibor Ladányi	2	1	0	0	0	0	2	1	0	0	0	0
5	MF	(Hungary) HUN	Róbert Kis	5	1	0	0	0	0	5	1	0	0	0	0
6	DF	(Hungary) HUN	Alex Szeleczki	1	0	0	0	0	0	1	0	0	0	0	0
7	MF	(Hungary) HUN	Dániel Kákonyi	4	0	0	0	0	0	4	0	0	0	0	0
12	FW	(Hungary) HUN	Szabolcs Csorba	1	0	0	0	0	0	1	0	0	0	0	0
12	MF	(Hungary) HUN	Zsolt Hajdu	1	0	0	0	0	0	1	0	0	0	0	0
13	FW	(Hungary) HUN	Márton Eppel	14	0	6	0	0	0	8	0	0	0	0	0
14	FW	(Hungary) HUN	Patrik Tischler	4	1	1	1	0	0	3	0	0	0	0	0
14	MF	(Hungary) HUN	Csaba Ponczók	3	0	0	0	0	0	3	0	0	0	0	0
15	MF	(Hungary) HUN	Tamás Nagy	2	0	0	0	0	0	2	0	0	0	0	0
17	DF	(Hungary) HUN	Attila Kornis	5	0	1	0	0	0	4	0	0	0	0	0
19	DF	(Hungary) HUN	Norbert Csiki	1	0	0	0	0	0	1	0	0	0	0	0
20	MF	(Hungary) HUN	Dániel Hauser	4	0	0	0	0	0	4	0	0	0	0	0
23	DF	(Hungary) HUN	László Szabó	8	0	3	0	0	0	5	0	0	0	0	0
26	GK	(Hungary) HUN	András Horváth	2	-2	0	-0	0	-0	2	-2	0	-0	0	-0
28	DF	(Hungary) HUN	András Gál	3	1	0	0	0	0	3	1	0	0	0	0
31	DF	(Hungary) HUN	Krisztián Ladiszlai	5	0	0	0	0	0	5	0	0	0	0	0
Players loaned out (for fall):
Players loaned out (for spring):
5	DF	(Hungary) HUN	Ádám Présinger	2	0	0	0	0	0	2	0	0	0	0	0
Players loaned out (for full season):
5	DF	(Hungary) HUN	Béla Balogh	3	0	1	0	0	0	0	0	0	0	2	0
7	FW	(Hungary) HUN	Tamás Kulcsár	5	0	3	0	0	0	0	0	1	0	1	0
21	DF	(Hungary) HUN	Gábor Bori	4	1	2	1	0	0	0	0	0	0	2	0
Players left the club (from summer):
24	DF	(Hungary) HUN	Zoltán Pollák	5	0	2	0	0	0	0	0	1	0	2	0
Players left the club (from winter):
15	MF	(Hungary) HUN	Levente Horváth	5	0	2	0	0	0	0	0	1	0	2	0

=== Top scorers ===
Includes all competitive matches. The list is sorted by shirt number when total goals are equal.

Position	Nation	Number	Name	Nemzeti Bajnokság I	Magyar Kupa	Ligakupa	Szuperkupa	UEFA Champions League	Total
1	(Hungary)	13	Ádám Hrepka	5	6	1	0	0	12
2	(Hungary)	2	Máté Pátkai	6	1	0	0	0	7
2	(Hungary)	12	László Lencse	3	4	0	0	0	7
2	(Hungary)	28	Gábor Urbán	7	0	0	0	0	7
5	(Hungary)	9	András Pál	5	0	0	0	0	5
5	(Hungary)	19	József Kanta	5	0	0	0	0	5
7	(Hungary)	16	Gábor Nagy	2	2	0	0	0	4
8	(Montenegro)	20	Mladen Lambulić	2	1	0	0	0	3
8	(Hungary)	25	Márk Nikházi	0	0	3	0	0	3
10	(Hungary)	3	Adrián Szekeres	1	0	1	0	0	2
10	(Hungary)	6	Ádám Szabó	1	1	0	0	0	2
10	(Hungary)	7	Sándor Hidvégi	1	0	1	0	0	2
10	(Hungary)	8	Tamás Kecskés	1	1	0	0	0	2
10	(Hungary)	15	Norbert Könyves	0	1	1	0	0	2
10	(Hungary)	30	András Gosztonyi	0	1	1	0	0	2
16	(Hungary)	3	Tibor Ladányi	0	0	1	0	0	1
16	(Hungary)	5	Róbert Kis	0	0	1	0	0	1
16	(Hungary)	14	Patrik Tischler	1	0	0	0	0	1
16	(Hungary)	17	László Zsidai	1	0	0	0	0	1
16	(Hungary)	18	Endre Bajúsz	0	0	1	0	0	1
16	(Hungary)	21	Gábor Bori	1	0	0	0	0	1
16	(Hungary)	22	István Rodenbücher	0	0	1	0	0	1
16	(Hungary)	27	Ádám Pintér	0	1	0	0	0	1
16	(Hungary)	28	András Gál	0	0	1	0	0	1
			Own Goals	1	0	0	0	0	1
			TOTALS	43	19	13	0	0	75

=== Hat-tricks ===
Player	Against	Result	Date	Competition	Round
(Hungary) Ádám Hrepka	Kaposvár	4–2 (A)	8 October 2008	Magyar Kupa	Round of 16

=== Disciplinary record ===
Includes all competitive matches. Players with 1 card or more included only.

Position	Nation	Number	Name	Nemzeti Bajnokság I		Magyar Kupa		Ligakupa		Szuperkupa		UEFA Champions League		Total (Hu Total)	
Position	Nation	Number	Name	Yellow card	Red card	Yellow card	Red card	Yellow card	Red card	Yellow card	Red card	Yellow card	Red card	Yellow card	Red card
MF	(Hungary)	2	Máté Pátkai	3	0	1	0	0	0	0	0	0	0	4 (3)	0 (0)
DF	(Hungary)	4	Dániel Vadnai	1	0	1	0	0	0	0	0	0	0	2 (1)	0 (0)
MF	(Hungary)	5	Róbert Kis	0	0	0	0	1	0	0	0	0	0	1 (0)	0 (0)
DF	(Hungary)	5	Ádám Présinger	0	0	0	0	1	0	0	0	0	0	1 (0)	0 (0)
DF	(Hungary)	5	Béla Balogh	0	0	0	0	0	0	0	0	1	0	1 (0)	0 (0)
MF	(Hungary)	6	Ádám Szabó	0	0	1	1	1	0	0	0	0	0	2 (0)	1 (0)
MF	(Hungary)	8	Tamás Kecskés	3	0	0	0	0	0	0	0	0	0	3 (3)	0 (0)
MF	(Hungary)	11	Vilmos Melczer	4	0	1	0	0	0	0	0	0	0	5 (4)	0 (0)
FW	(Hungary)	12	László Lencse	5	0	0	0	1	1	0	0	0	0	6 (5)	1 (0)
FW	(Hungary)	13	Ádám Hrepka	3	0	1	0	0	0	0	0	0	0	4 (3)	0 (0)
FW	(Hungary)	13	Márton Eppel	1	0	0	0	0	0	0	0	0	0	1 (1)	0 (0)
MF	(Hungary)	15	Levente Horváth	1	0	0	0	0	0	0	0	0	0	1 (1)	0 (0)
MF	(Hungary)	15	Norbert Könyves	2	0	0	0	0	0	0	0	0	0	2 (2)	0 (0)
MF	(Hungary)	16	Gábor Nagy	5	0	1	0	0	0	1	0	0	0	7 (5)	0 (0)
DF	(Hungary)	17	Attila Kornis	0	0	0	0	0	1	0	0	0	0	0 (0)	1 (0)
MF	(Hungary)	17	László Zsidai	9	0	2	0	0	0	0	0	0	0	11 (9)	0 (0)
DF	(Hungary)	18	Endre Bajúsz	1	0	0	0	0	0	0	0	0	0	1 (1)	0 (0)
MF	(Hungary)	19	József Kanta	1	0	1	0	0	0	0	0	0	0	2 (1)	0 (0)
DF	(Montenegro)	20	Mladen Lambulić	4	1	1	0	0	0	1	0	0	0	6 (4)	1 (1)
MF	(Hungary)	20	Dániel Hauser	0	0	0	0	1	0	0	0	0	0	1 (0)	0 (0)
DF	(Hungary)	21	Gábor Bori	0	0	0	0	0	0	0	0	1	0	1 (0)	0 (0)
DF	(Hungary)	22	István Rodenbücher	4	1	0	0	0	0	0	0	0	0	4 (4)	1 (1)
DF	(Montenegro)	23	Marko Radulović	2	0	1	0	1	0	0	0	0	0	4 (2)	0 (0)
DF	(Hungary)	23	László Szabó	0	0	0	0	1	0	0	0	0	0	1 (0)	0 (0)
DF	(Hungary)	24	Zoltán Pollák	1	0	0	0	0	0	0	0	1	0	2 (1)	0 (0)
MF	(Hungary)	27	Ádám Pintér	2	1	1	1	0	0	0	0	1	0	4 (2)	2 (1)
DF	(Hungary)	28	András Gál	0	0	0	0	1	0	0	0	0	0	1 (0)	0 (0)
FW	(Hungary)	28	Gábor Urbán	4	0	0	0	0	0	0	0	1	0	5 (4)	0 (0)
GK	(Hungary)	29	Zoltán Szatmári	0	0	0	0	1	0	0	0	0	0	1 (0)	0 (0)
MF	(Hungary)	30	András Gosztonyi	1	0	0	0	1	0	0	0	0	0	2 (1)	0 (0)
FW	(Hungary)	31	Marcell Molnár	0	0	0	0	1	0	0	0	0	0	1 (0)	0 (0)
			TOTALS	57	3	12	2	11	2	2	0	5	0	87 (57)	7 (3)

=== Clean sheets ===
Position	Nation	Number	Name	Nemzeti Bajnokság I	Magyar Kupa	Ligakupa	Szuperkupa	UEFA Champions League	Total
1	(Hungary)	1	Zoltán Végh	11	0	2	1	0	14
2	(Hungary)	1	Milán Balikó	0	0	1	0	0	1
2	(Hungary)	1	György Scheilinger	0	0	1	0	0	1
4	(Hungary)	26	András Horváth	0	0	0	0	0	0
4	(Hungary)	29	Zoltán Szatmári	0	0	0	0	0	0
			TOTALS	11	0	4	1	0	16
