= 2008–09 Újpest FC season =

Újpest
2008–09 season
- Manager: Lázár Szentes
- Stadium: Szusza Ferenc Stadion
- Nemzeti Bajnokság I: 2nd
- Magyar Kupa: Quarter-finals
- Ligakupa: Quarter-finals
- Top goalscorer: League: Péter Kabát (16); All: Péter Kabát (21)
- Highest home attendance: 10,265 v Debrecen (20 March 2009, Nemzeti Bajnokság I)
- Lowest home attendance: 300 v Zalaegerszeg (12 November 2008, Ligakupa)
- Average home league attendance: 5,168
- Biggest win: 7–0 v Bőcs (Home, 22 October 2008, Magyar Kupa)
- Biggest defeat: 2–4 v Vasas (Away, 1 August 2008, Nemzeti Bajnokság I); 2–4 v Kaposvár (Home, 22 November 2008, Ligakupa ) 1–3 v Paks (Away, 29 November 2008, Ligakupa); 1–3 v Paks (Away, 9 May 2009, Nemzeti Bajnokság I)

The 2008–09 season was Újpest Football Club's 104th competitive season, 98th consecutive season in the Nemzeti Bajnokság I and 109th season in existence as a football club. In addition to the domestic league, Újpest participated in that season's editions of the Magyar Kupa and the Ligakupa.

== Squad ==
Squad at end of season

Note: Flags indicate national team as defined under FIFA eligibility rules; some limited exceptions apply. Players may hold more than one non-FIFA nationality.

No.	Pos.	Nation	Player
1	GK	HUN	Szabolcs Balajcza
2	DF	SRB	Ivan Dudić
3	DF	CRO	Josip Ćutuk
4	DF	ENG	Scott Malone
5	DF	HUN	Tamás Tóvizi
6	MF	ENG	Tony Stokes
7	MF	BIH	Mario Božić
8	FW	HUN	Péter Rajczi
9	FW	HUN	Attila Simon
10	FW	HUN	Tibor Tisza
11	MF	HUN	Péter Simek
13	MF	HUN	Gábor Bori
14	MF	HUN	Péter Kincses
15	DF	HUN	Zoltán Kiss
16	MF	HUN	Márk Bogdán
17	DF	HUN	Róbert Litauszki

No.	Pos.	Nation	Player
18	DF	MKD	Mirsad Mijadinoski
19	FW	HUN	Bence Szabó
20	MF	CAF	Foxi Kéthévoama
21	DF	HUN	Zsolt Korcsmár
22	FW	HUN	Péter Kabát
23	GK	HUN	András Dombai
24	DF	HUN	Zoltán Pollák
25	DF	HUN	Gábor Dvorschák
26	DF	HUN	Wilson Electo
27	MF	HUN	Mohamed Remili
28	MF	BRA	Jucemar
29	MF	HUN	Bertold Popovics
30	MF	HUN	Richárd Frank
31	DF	HUN	Dávid Barczi
33	FW	HUN	Bence Lázár
36	GK	HUN	Tamás Horváth

== Competitions ==
=== Overview ===
Competition	First match	Last match	Starting round	Final position	Record							
Competition	First match	Last match	Starting round	Final position	Pld	W	D	L	GF	GA	GD	Win %
Nemzeti Bajnokság I	26 July 2008	29 May 2009	Matchday 1	2nd	30	17	8	5	61	38	+23	56.67
Magyar Kupa	3 September 2008	17 March 2009	Third round	Quarter-finals	6	4	1	1	17	6	+11	66.67
Ligakupa	1 October 2008	26 March 2009	Group stage	Quarter-finals	12	6	2	4	28	20	+8	50.00
Total					48	27	11	10	106	64	+42	56.25

Source: Competitions

=== Nemzeti Bajnokság I ===
==== League table ====
Pos	Team	Pld	W	D	L	GF	GA	GD	Pts	Qualification or relegation
1	Debrecen (C)	30	21	5	4	70	29	+41	68	Qualification for Champions League second qualifying round
2	Újpest	30	17	8	5	61	38	+23	59	Qualification for Europa League second qualifying round
3	Haladás	30	16	5	9	44	29	+15	53	Qualification for Europa League first qualifying round
4	Zalaegerszeg	30	15	7	8	52	44	+8	52	
5	Kecskemét	30	14	6	10	55	44	+11	48	

Source: soccerway.com
Rules for classification: 1st points; 2nd overall wins; 3rd goal difference; 4th goals scored
(C) Champions

==== Results summary ====
Overall								Home						Away					
Pld	W	D	L	GF	GA	GD	Pts	W	D	L	GF	GA	GD	W	D	L	GF	GA	GD
30	17	8	5	61	38	+23	59	12	2	1	35	14	+21	5	6	4	26	24	+2

Source: Hungarian Football Federation

==== Results by round ====
Round	1	2	3	4	5	6	7	8	9	10	11	12	13	14	15	16	17	18	19	20	21	22	23	24	25	26	27	28	29	30
Ground	H	A	A	H	A	H	A	H	A	H	A	H	A	H	A	A	H	H	A	H	A	H	A	H	A	H	A	H	A	H
Result	W	L	W	W	D	W	W	W	D	W	D	W	D	D	D	W	W	W	W	W	D	W	W	W	L	D	L	W	L	L
Position	6	12	5	2	4	2	1	1	1	1	2	2	2	2	2	2	1	1	1	1	1	1	1	1	2	2	2	2	2	2
Points	3	3	6	9	10	13	16	19	20	23	24	27	28	29	30	33	36	39	42	45	46	49	52	55	55	56	56	59	59	59

Source: Matches
A = Away; H = Home; W = Win; D = Draw; L = Loss

==== Matches ====
26 July 2008 1	Újpest	1–0	Nyíregyháza	Budapest
20:00 CEST (UTC+2)	Kabát 40'; Vaskó (yellow card) 43'; Remili (yellow card) 50'	Report	Belényesi (yellow card) 17'; Goia (yellow card) 26'; Dosso (yellow card) 43'; Lăzăreanu (red card) 66'	Stadium: Szusza Ferenc Stadion; Attendance: 4,449; Referee: Sándor Andó-Szabó; Assistant referees: György Ring, Zsolt Butkai; Fourth official: Gergely Szőts

1 August 2008 2	Vasas	4–2	Újpest	Budapest
19:00 CEST (UTC+2)	Dobrić 11'; N. Németh 12', (yellow card) 61'; Paripović (yellow card) 36'; Divić 47'; Piller (yellow card) 47'; Lázok 68'	Report	Vaskó (yellow card) 27', (goal) 82'; Božić (yellow card) 39'; Kabát 61'; Lipták (yellow card) 68'	Stadium: Illovszky Rudolf Stadion; Attendance: 5,000; Referee: István Vad; Assistant referees: Vencel Tóth II, Balázs Farkas; Fourth official: József Erdős

9 August 2008 3	Siófok	0–1	Újpest	Siófok
20:00 CEST (UTC+2)	Fülöp (yellow card) 60'; Sütő (yellow card) 65'; Mogyorósi (red card) 83'	Report	Jucemar (yellow card) 26'; Kabát (yellow card) 41'; Rajczi 83'	Stadium: Révész Géza utcai Stadion; Attendance: 5,000; Referee: József Berger; Assistant referees: Attila Forgács, Szabolcs Deutsch; Fourth official: Balázs Berke

15 August 2008 4	Újpest	1–0	Haladás	Budapest
19:00 CEST (UTC+2)	Rajczi 9'; Dudić (yellow card) 24'; Lipták (yellow card) 32'; Vaskó (yellow card) 90'	Report	Rajos (yellow card) 8'; A. Simon II (yellow card) 81'; Kuttor (yellow card) 86'	Stadium: Szusza Ferenc Stadion; Attendance: 3,424; Referee: Zoltán Iványi; Assistant referees: István Albert, János Medovarszki; Fourth official: Tibor Csatári

23 August 2008 5	Debrecen	1–1	Újpest	Debrecen
20:00 CEST (UTC+2)	Kerekes (yellow card) 59'; I. Szűcs (yellow card) 63'; Oláh 76'	Report	A. Simon I 70'	Stadium: Oláh Gábor utcai Stadion; Attendance: 7,500; Referee: István Mészáros; Assistant referees: László Viszokai, Tibor Vígh; Fourth official: János Takács

30 August 2008 6	Újpest	4–3	Kecskemét	Budapest
15:00 CEST (UTC+2)	Ćutuk 7'; Božić 20', (yellow card) 75'; Mijadinoski (yellow card) 21'; G. Sándor (yellow card) 57'; Kabát 73', 88', (yellow card) 89'; Széki (yellow card) 90+1'	Report	Grkinić (yellow card) 61'; Litsingi 68'; Csordás 70', 80'; Čukić (yellow card) 83'; Mitrović (yellow card) 84'	Stadium: Szusza Ferenc Stadion; Attendance: 5,212; Referee: Viktor Kassai; Assistant referees: Gábor Erős, Tibor Vámos; Fourth official: Gergő Janitz

14 September 2008 7	Rákospalota	1–3	Újpest	Budapest
17:30 CEST (UTC+2)	Nyerges 3'; B. Kovács (yellow card) 72'; G. Horváth I (red card) 77'; Balaskó (yellow card) 90+2'	Report	Ćutuk 5'; Mijadinoski 18'; Kabát 44'; Remili (yellow card) 81'	Stadium: Budai II. László Stadion; Attendance: 2,000; Referee: Péter Solymosi; Assistant referees: Gábor Takács, Oszkár Lémon; Fourth official: Dávid Ákos

21 September 2008 8	Újpest	3–2	Kaposvár	Budapest
20:00 CEST (UTC+2)	Mijadinoski 6', (yellow card) 52'; Ćutuk 25'; Rajczi 64'	Report	Bogdán (yellow card) 16'; Graszl (yellow card) 19'; Pest (yellow card) 41'; Nikolić 60'; Zahorecz 83', (yellow card) 90'	Stadium: Szusza Ferenc Stadion; Attendance: 4,813; Referee: József Berger; Assistant referees: Attila Forgács, István Tóth; Fourth official: János Kőrösi

27 September 2008 9	Honvéd	1–1	Újpest	Budapest
15:00 CEST (UTC+2)	Guié 11'; Smiljanić (yellow card) 23'	Report	Z. Kiss (yellow card) 17'; Lipták (yellow card) 26'; Maróti 41' (o.g.)	Stadium: Bozsik József Stadion; Attendance: 3,000; Referee: István Mészáros; Assistant referees: László Viszokai, Balázs Farkas; Fourth official: Gergő Janitz

4 October 2008 10	Újpest	4–1	MTK	Budapest
15:00 CEST (UTC+2)	Božić 19', 58'; Bori 51'; G. Sándor (yellow card) 60'; Kabát 90+1'	Report	Zsidai (yellow card) 23'; G. Nagy (yellow card) 26', (goal) 84'	Stadium: Szusza Ferenc Stadion; Attendance: 4,289; Referee: Péter Solymosi; Assistant referees: Tibor Vámos, Vencel Tóth II; Fourth official: Dávid Ákos

19 October 2008 11	Diósgyőr	0–0	Újpest	Miskolc
17:30 CEST (UTC+2)		Report	Bori (yellow card) 35'; Pollák (yellow card) 77'; Rajczi (yellow card) 90'	Stadium: Diósgyőri Stadion; Attendance: 6,000; Referee: Tamás Arany; Assistant referees: Róbert Kispál, László Viszokai; Fourth official: Balázs Lak

26 October 2008 12	Újpest	3–1	Paks	Budapest
17:30 CET (UTC+1)	Božić (yellow card) 3'; Kabát (yellow card) 23', (goal) 55', 89'; Korcsmár 82'	Report	Böde (yellow card) 26'; Kriston (yellow card) 34'; T. Kiss I 52'	Stadium: Szusza Ferenc Stadion; Attendance: 4,355; Referee: Tamás Bognár; Assistant referees: Dr. Zsolt Varga, Zoltán Pápai; Fourth official: Róbert Nagy

31 October 2008 13	Zalaegerszeg	2–2	Újpest	Zalaegerszeg
19:00 CET (UTC+1)	Waltner 24', 71', (yellow card) 26'; Szamosi (yellow card) 63'	Report	Korcsmár 4'; Dudić (yellow card) 21'; Rajczi 43'; Lipták (red card) 66'; Božić (yellow card) 73'	Stadium: ZTE Arena; Attendance: 6,431; Referee: Viktor Kassai; Assistant referees: Gábor Erős, Tibor Vámos; Fourth official: Péter Tamási

7 November 2008 14	Újpest	1–1	Győr	Budapest
17:30 CET (UTC+1)	Šupić 2' (o.g.); Rajczi (yellow card) 49'; Kabát (yellow card) 69'; Bori (yellow card) 84'	Report	Tokody 20'; Völgyi (yellow card) 55'; Zámbó (red card) 76'; Bicák (yellow card) 81'	Stadium: Szusza Ferenc Stadion; Attendance: 5,500; Referee: István Mészáros; Assistant referees: Róbert Kispál, György Ring; Fourth official: Balázs Lak

16 November 2008 15	Fehérvár	0–0	Újpest	Székesfehérvár
17:30 CET (UTC+1)	Koller (yellow card) 75'	Report	Dudić (yellow card) 79'	Stadium: Sóstói Stadion; Attendance: 3,628; Referee: Ferenc Bede; Assistant referees: Vencel Tóth II, Zoltán Kis; Fourth official: Gergő Janitz

22 February 2009 16	Nyíregyháza	1–3	Újpest	Nyíregyháza
17:30 CET (UTC+1)	Apostu 4', (yellow card) 56'; Imedashvili (yellow card) 68'	Report	Kabát 25'; Dudić (yellow card) 30'; Božić (yellow card) 31'; Korcsmár (yellow card) 39'; Mijadinoski (yellow card) 63', (goal) 66'; Rajczi 83'	Stadium: Városi Stadion; Attendance: 3,500; Referee: Zoltán Iványi; Assistant referees: István Albert, János Medovarszki; Fourth official: Gábor Fajkusz

7 March 2009 18	Újpest	2–0	Siófok	Budapest
18:00 CET (UTC+1)	Rajczi (yellow card) 2', (goal) 52'; Kabát (yellow card) 63'; Dudić (yellow card) 77'; Tisza 90'	Report	Sütő (yellow card) 12'; S. Kanta (yellow card) 40'; Ribeiro (yellow card) 68'; Magasföldi (yellow card) 82'	Stadium: Szusza Ferenc Stadion; Attendance: 4,667; Referee: Roland Veizer; Assistant referees: Péter Berettyán, Attila Kelemen; Fourth official: Tibor Gyarmati II

13 March 2009 19	Haladás	0–2	Újpest	Szombathely
19:00 CET (UTC+1)	P. Tóth I (yellow card) 55'; Sipos (yellow card) 83'	Report	Tisza 8'; Bori (yellow card) 20'; Kéthévoama 58'; Mijadinoski (yellow card) 61'; Simek (red card) 87'	Stadium: Rohonci út Attendance: 7,000; Referee: Zsolt Szabó; Assistant referees: György Ring, Vencel Tóth II; Fourth official: József Erdős

20 March 2009 20	Újpest	2–0	Debrecen	Budapest
19:00 CET (UTC+1)	Kabát 7'; Rajczi 58', (yellow card) 75'; Pollák (yellow card) 73'; Kéthévoama (yellow card) 78'	Report	Komlósi (yellow card) 51'	Stadium: Szusza Ferenc Stadion; Attendance: 10,265; Referee: Viktor Kassai; Assistant referees: Tibor Vámos, Gábor Erős; Fourth official: Ádám Németh

4 April 2009 21	Kecskemét	2–2	Újpest	Kecskemét
15:00 CEST (UTC+2)	Gyagya 8'; Csordás 49'	Report	Rajczi 33'; Bori (yellow card) 62'; Dudić (yellow card) 62'; Korcsmár 67'; Mijadinoski (yellow card) 71'	Stadium: Széktói Stadion; Attendance: 6,000; Referee: Sándor Andó-Szabó; Assistant referees: Zsolt Butkai, Tibor Vígh; Fourth official: Gábor Oláh

11 April 2009 22	Újpest	3–0	Rákospalota	Budapest
19:00 CEST (UTC+2)	Kabát 19', (yellow card) 34'; Božić 74'; A. Simon I 87'	Report	Z. Varga (yellow card) 15'; Ambrusz (yellow card) 36'	Stadium: Szusza Ferenc Stadion; Attendance: 5,027; Referee: Ádám Németh; Assistant referees: István Tóth, Balázs Farkas; Fourth official: László Varga

18 April 2009 23	Kaposvár	2–3	Újpest	Kaposvár
15:00 CEST (UTC+2)	Zsolnai 4'; Zahorecz 32'; Hegedűs (yellow card) 33'; Gujić (yellow card) 52'; Zo. Kovács (yellow card) 54'	Report	Stokes (yellow card) 27'; Kabát (yellow card) 29'; Božić (yellow card) 30'; Pollák 44'; Tisza (yellow card) 54', (goal) 84'; Rajczi 70'	Stadium: Rákóczi Stadion; Attendance: 3,500; Referee: Viktor Kassai; Assistant referees: Gábor Erős, Zoltán Szalai; Fourth official: Gábor Péter Kovács

24 April 2009 24	Újpest	3–0	Honvéd	Budapest
19:00 CEST (UTC+2)	Kabát 12', 86'; Pollák (red card) 38'; Tisza (yellow card) 43'; Malone 49', (yellow card) 50'	Report	Debreceni (yellow card) 26'; Angoua (red card) 69'	Stadium: Szusza Ferenc Stadion; Attendance: 8,196; Referee: Mihály Fábián; Assistant referees: Dr. Zsolt Varga, Tamás Márkus; Fourth official: Balázs Böcskei

29 April 2009 25	MTK	3–2	Újpest	Budapest
18:00 CEST (UTC+2)	Pátkai 42', 78'; Urbán (yellow card) 62', (goal) 88'	Report	Korcsmár 45'; Tisza 46'	Stadium: Hidegkuti Nándor Stadion; Attendance: 2,000; Referee: Zoltán Iványi; Assistant referees: Zsolt Szpisják, János Medovarszki; Fourth official: Sándor Andó-Szabó

3 May 2009 26	Újpest	2–2	Diósgyőr	Budapest
17:30 CEST (UTC+2)	Kéthévoama 55'; Korcsmár (yellow card) 63', (goal) 69'	Report	M. Tóth 56'; Honma 67'; Búrány (yellow card) 73'; Višković (yellow card) 82'	Stadium: Szusza Ferenc Stadion; Attendance: 5,617; Referee: Sándor Andó-Szabó; Assistant referees: Vencel Tóth II, Attila Kelemen; Fourth official: László Varga

6 May 2009 17	Újpest	3–1	Vasas	Budapest
18:00 CEST (UTC+2)	Tisza 14'; Simek (red card) 17'; Kabát 22', 45'; Pollák (yellow card) 35'; Malone (yellow card) 77'	Report	Dobrić 4'; G. Németh (yellow card) 21'; Vujović (yellow card) 55'; Laczkó (red card) 67'	Stadium: Szusza Ferenc Stadion; Attendance: 3,168; Referee: Zsolt Szabó; Assistant referees: Róbert Kispál, Tibor Vígh; Fourth official: Tibor Gyarmati II

9 May 2009 27	Paks	3–1	Újpest	Paks
19:00 CEST (UTC+2)	Éger 49', (yellow card) 50'; L. Horváth 55'; Tököli (yellow card) 76'; Vári 90+1'	Report	Tisza 12'; Korcsmár (yellow card) 43'; Malone (yellow card) 72'; Dudić (yellow card) 76'; Kabát (red card) 79'	Stadium: Fehérvári úti Stadion; Attendance: 5,500; Referee: Tamás Arany; Assistant referees: Tibor Vámos, Zsolt Butkai; Fourth official: J. Zoltán Kovács

15 May 2009 28	Újpest	2–1	Zalaegerszeg	Budapest
19:00 CEST (UTC+2)	Tisza (yellow card) 35'; Lipták 36'; A. Simon I 59'; Božić (yellow card) 67'	Report	Sluka (yellow card) 44'; Szamosi (yellow card) 67'; G. Kovács (yellow card) 84'; Pavićević 86'; A. Horváth II (yellow card) 90+2'	Stadium: Szusza Ferenc Stadion; Attendance: 4,238; Referee: Péter Solymosi; Assistant referees: László Viszokai, Gábor Takács; Fourth official: Gergely Sulyok

23 May 2009 29	Győr	4–3	Újpest	Győr
15:00 CEST (UTC+2)	Brnović 24'; Božić 42' (o.g.); M. Kiss 58'; Dorogi (yellow card) 71'; Aleksidze 89'	Report	Tisza 13'; A. Simon I 17'; Božić (yellow card) 35'; Pollák 41'; Stokes (yellow card) 64'; Bori (yellow card) 88'	Stadium: ETO Park; Attendance: 4,000; Referee: Sándor Andó-Szabó; Assistant referees: Vencel Tóth II, Balázs Farkas; Fourth official: Gergő Janitz

29 May 2009 30	Újpest	1–2	Fehérvár	Budapest
19:00 CEST (UTC+2)	Lipták (yellow card) 49'; Dudić (yellow card) 57'; Kabát 69'; Božić (red card) 90+3'	Report	Alves 30'; Vujović 45', (red card) 90+3'	Stadium: Szusza Ferenc Stadion; Attendance: 4,293; Referee: Zsolt Szabó; Assistant referees: Zsolt Butkai, István Tóth; Fourth official: Balázs Böcskei

=== Magyar Kupa ===
3 September 2008 Third round	Vecsés	1–1 (a.e.t.) (3–5 p)	Újpest	Vecsés
15:30 CEST (UTC+2)	Hungler (yellow card) 12'; Csillag (yellow card) 30'; Mészáros (yellow card) 56'; Lukács 104'	Report	Széki (yellow card) 21'; Božić (yellow card) 40'; Z. Kiss (yellow card) 42'; Ćutuk (red card) 60'; Remili (yellow card) 63'; A. Simon I 120'	Stadium: Stadion Dózsa György út Attendance: 1,200; Referee: Roland Veizer; Assistant referees: Péter Berettyán, Zoltán Pápai

24 September 2008 Round of 32	Tuzsér	1–2	Újpest	Nyíregyháza (Note: The match was played at the Városi Stadion in Nyíregyháza, instead of Tuzsér regular stadium, the Lónyay Kastélykerti pálya in Tuzsér.)
15:30 CEST (UTC+2)	Orgován 64'; Lovas (yellow card) 69'; Iván (yellow card) 85'	Report	Széki (yellow card) 18', (goal) 58'; Jucemar (yellow card) 63'; Remili 74'; Lipták (yellow card) 76'	Stadium: Városi Stadion; Attendance: 700; Referee: Ádám Farkas; Assistant referees: Attila Kelemen, Gyula Fehér

==== Round of 16 ====
8 October 2008 First leg	Bőcs	0–3	Újpest	Miskolc (Note: The match was played at the Diósgyőri Stadion in Miskolc, instead of Bőcs regular stadium, the Szabadság utcai Stadion in Bőcs.)
17:30 CEST (UTC+2)	Jeney (yellow card) 33'; Martis (yellow card) 60'	Report	A. Simon I 61'; Božić 62'; Jucemar 89'	Stadium: Diósgyőri Stadion; Attendance: 1,200; Referee: Ferenc Bede; Assistant referees: Tibor Vígh, János Agócs

22 October 2008 Second leg	Újpest	7–0 (10–0 agg.)	Bőcs	Budapest
18:00 CEST (UTC+2)	Kéthévoama 24', 42', 66'; A. Simon I 35'; Üveges 37'; Remili 58', 81'	Report		Stadium: Szusza Ferenc Stadion; Attendance: 1.029; Referee: Ádám Farkas; Assistant referees: Attila Kelemen, Gábor Varga Jr.
Note: Újpest won 10–0 on aggregate.

==== Quarter-finals ====
11 March 2009 First leg	MTK	1–2	Újpest	Budapest
18:00 CET (UTC+1)	Vadnai (yellow card) 15'; Pintér (red card) 26'; Zsidai (yellow card) 53'; Lencse 66'	Report	Kabát 26' (pen.); A. Simon I 38'; Remili (yellow card) 55'; Ćutuk (yellow card) 69'; Malone (yellow card) 71'; Stokes (yellow card) 89'	Stadium: Hidegkuti Nándor Stadion; Attendance: 400; Referee: Tamás Bognár; Assistant referees: László Viszokai, Gábor Takács

17 March 2009 Second leg	Újpest	2–3 (4–4 (a) agg.)	MTK	Budapest
18:00 CET (UTC+1)	A. Simon I 19', 35'; Kéthévoama (yellow card) 56'; Gaucho (yellow card) 82'; Korcsmár (yellow card) 90'	Report	Lencse 36'; Kanta (yellow card) 55'; Hrepka 76'; Lambulić (yellow card) 81'; Á. Szabó 85', (red card) 86'	Stadium: Szusza Ferenc Stadion; Attendance: 2,773; Referee: Péter Solymosi; Assistant referees: Oszkár Lémon, István Tóth; Fourth official: Zoltán Szalai
Note: 4–4 on aggregate. MTK won on away goals.

=== Ligakupa ===
==== Group stage ====
Pos	Team	Pld	W	D	L	GF	GA	GD	Pts	Qualification	UJP	PEC	KAP	ZAL	PAK	DUN
1	Újpest	10	6	2	2	25	15	+10	20	Advance to knockout phase	—	4–0	2–4	2–1	0–0	5–1
2	Pécs	10	6	2	2	24	14	+10	20	Advance to knockout phase	1–1	—	2–4	2–0	3–1	3–1
3	Kaposvár	10	6	1	3	26	20	+6	19		2–4	1–4	—	1–0	2–1	2–2
4	Zalaegerszeg	10	4	1	5	15	15	0	13		2–3	0–0	0–5	—	3–1	5–0
5	Paks	10	3	2	5	17	14	+3	11		3–1	0–1	4–0	0–2	—	2–2
6	Dunaújváros	10	0	2	8	11	40	−29	2		1–3	2–8	1–5	1–2	0–5	—

Source: HFF

1 October 2008 1	Kaposvár	2–4	Újpest	Kaposvár
16:00 CEST (UTC+2)	Reszli 24'; Tabi 78'	Report	Kéthévoama 14'; Lázár 29'; B. Szabó 35', 60'	Stadium: Rákóczi Stadion; Attendance: 200; Referee: Krisztián Pánczél; Assistant referees: Szabolcs Deutsch, Arnold Kepe

14 October 2008 2	Újpest	0–0	Paks	Budapest
19:00 CEST (UTC+2)	Szekér (yellow card) 57'	Report		Stadium: Szusza Ferenc Stadion; Attendance: 600; Referee: László Varga; Assistant referees: István Tóth, János Demeter

29 October 2008 3	Pécs	1–1	Újpest	Pécs
17:00 CET (UTC+1)	Z. Horváth 14'; Lantos (yellow card) 23'	Report	Remili (yellow card) 39'; A. Simon I 53'	Stadium: Stadion PMFC; Attendance: 600; Referee: Gergely Sulyok; Assistant referees: Zoltán Szalai, Zoltán Kis

5 November 2008 4	Dunaújváros	1–3	Újpest	Dunaújváros
13:30 CET (UTC+1)	A. Nagy (yellow card) 13'; Facskó (yellow card) 22'; Simpson 63'	Report	Kéthévoama 4', 57', (yellow card) 31'; K. Simon 34'; Bogdán (yellow card) 63'	Stadium: Dunaújvárosi Stadion; Attendance: 300; Referee: József Berger; Assistant referees: Attila Forgács, Attila Beidek

12 November 2008 5	Újpest	2–1	Zalaegerszeg	Budapest
19:00 CET (UTC+1)	Üveges (yellow card) 44'; Szekér 51'; Remili 72'	Report	Pekič 86'	Stadium: Szusza Ferenc Stadion; Attendance: 300; Referee: Ádám Németh; Assistant referees: Zoltán Szalai, Gábor Varga Jr.

22 November 2008 6	Újpest	2–4	Kaposvár	Budapest
15:00 CET (UTC+1)	Kéthévoama 34'; Rajczi 87', (red card) 90+3'	Report	Petrók 13'; Nikolić 16', 42'; Ćutuk 39' (o.g.); Grúz (yellow card) 74'	Stadium: Szusza Ferenc Stadion; Attendance: 500; Referee: Péter Solmyosi; Assistant referees: Gábor Takács, Oszkár Lémon

29 November 2008 7	Paks	3–1	Újpest	Paks
15:00 CET (UTC+1)	Vári (yellow card) 6'; S. Horváth (yellow card) 45'; T. Kiss I 47', 90'; Heffler 76'	Report	Kéthévoama 25', (yellow card) 45'; Üveges (yellow card) 58'	Stadium: Fehérvári úti Stadion; Attendance: 150; Referee: Tamás Arany; Assistant referees: Imre Attila Nagy, Petz Brigitta Makkosné

7 December 2008 8	Újpest	4–0	Pécs	Budapest
13:00 CET (UTC+1)	Lipták 27'; Remili (yellow card) 28', (goal) 71'; Kéthévoama 56'; A. Simon I 67'	Report	Lantos (yellow card) 44'	Stadium: Szusza Ferenc Stadium; Attendance: 1,000; Referee: Zoltán Iványi; Assistant referees: István Albert, János Medovarszki

7 February 2009 9	Újpest	5–1	Dunaújváros	Budapest
19:00 CET (UTC+1)	Tisza 14'; Božić 20', (yellow card) 71'; Rajczi 24'; Kabát 39'; Remili (yellow card) 70'; A. Simon I 88'	Report	A. Nagy (yellow card) 22'; Marques 34'; Homonyik (yellow card) 47'	Stadium: Szusza Ferenc Stadion; Attendance: 800; Referee: Balázs Böcskei; Assistant referees: Péter Berettyán, Lajos L. Tóth

14 February 2009 10	Zalaegerszeg	2–3	Újpest	Zalaegerszeg
15:00 CET (UTC+1)	Kocsárdi (yellow card) 34'; Pavićević (yellow card) 45'; Balázs 59'; Botiș (yellow card) 63'; Waltner 90+3'	Report	Kabát 10', 68'; Božić (yellow card) 80'; Kéthévoama 90'	Stadium: ZTE Arena; Attendance: 300; Referee: Zsolt Szabó; Assistant referees: Róbert Kispál, Vencel Tóth II

==== Knockout phase ====
===== Quarter-finals =====
4 March 2009 First leg	Győr	3–2	Újpest	Győr
14:30 CET (UTC+1)	Bicák (yellow card) 19'; Pákolicz 25'; M. Kiss 27'; Jäkl (yellow card) 62'; Aleksidze 88'	Report	Privigyei (yellow card) 39'; A. Simon I 51'; Popovics 85'	Stadium: ETO Park; Attendance: 600; Referee: Viktor Kassai; Assistant referees: Gábor Erős, Tibor Vámos

26 March 2009 Second leg	Újpest	1–2 (3–5 agg.)	Győr	Budapest
18:00 CET (UTC+1)	Rajczi (yellow card) 39'; Kabát 82'; Božić (yellow card) 87'	Report	Bicák 15', (yellow card) 16'; Sánta (yellow card) 36', (goal) 45'; Stevanović (yellow card) 39'; Dorogi (yellow card) 44'	Stadium: Szusza Ferenc Stadion; Attendance: 800; Referee: Szabolcs Szilasi; Assistant referees: Róbert Kispál, Gábor Takács
Note: Győr won 5–3 on aggregate.

== Statistics ==
=== Overall ===
Appearances (Apps) numbers are for appearances in competitive games only, including sub appearances.
Source: Competitions

No.	Player	Pos.	Nemzeti Bajnokság I				Magyar Kupa				Ligakupa				Total			
No.	Player	Pos.	Apps	Goal	Yellow card	Red card	Apps	Goal	Yellow card	Red card	Apps	Goal	Yellow card	Red card	Apps	Goal	Yellow card	Red card
1	(Hungary) Szabolcs Balajcza	GK	30				5				4				39			
2	(Serbia) Ivan Dudić	DF	28		8		3				5				36		8	
3	(Croatia) Josip Ćutuk	DF	6	3			4		1	1	5				15	3	1	1
4	(England) Scott Malone	DF	8	1	3		2		1		2				12	1	4	
5	(Hungary) György Sándor	MF	15		2		2				1				18		2	
5	(Hungary) Tamás Tóvizi	DF					1				3				4			
6	(England) Tony Stokes	MF	13		2		2		1		1				16		3	
6	(Hungary) Szabolcs Üveges	MF					1	1			7		2		8	1	2	
7	(Bosnia and Herzegovina) Mario Božić	MF	27	4	8	1	5	1	1		6	1	3		38	6	12	1
8	(Hungary) Péter Rajczi	FW	23	9	4						5	2	1	1	28	11	5	1
9	(Hungary) Attila Simon	FW	23	4			6	6			8	4			37	14		
10	(Hungary) Tibor Tisza	FW	16	7	3		1				3	1			20	8	3	
11	(Hungary) Péter Simek	MF	12			2	2				2				16			2
11	(Hungary) Attila Széki	FW	3		1		2	1	2		5				10	1	3	
13	(Hungary) Gábor Bori	MF	22	1	5		4				6				32	1	5	
14	(Hungary) Péter Kincses	MF	3												3			
15	(Hungary) Zoltán Kiss	DF	6		1		4		1		4				14		2	
16	(Hungary) Márk Bogdán	MF									3		1		3		1	
16	(Hungary) Dávid Szekér	MF									5	1	1		5	1	1	
17	(Hungary) Attila Hullám	MF	1								1				2			
17	(Hungary) Ádám Kisznyér	FW									2				2			
17	(Hungary) Zoltán Lipták	DF	19	1	4	1	2		1		4	1			25	2	5	1
17	(Hungary) Róbert Litauszki	DF									5				5			
17	(Hungary) Sándor Mihalecz	N/A									1				1			
18	(North Macedonia) Mirsad Mijadinoski	DF	26	3	5		4				5				35	3	5	
19	(Hungary) Bence Szabó	FW	1				1				5	2			7	2		
19	(Hungary) Tamás Vaskó	DF	5	1	3										5	1	3	
20	(Central African Republic) Foxi Kéthévoama	MF	23	2	1		5	3	1		10	7	2		38	12	4	
21	(Hungary) Zsolt Korcsmár	DF	24	5	3		3		1		3				30	5	4	
22	(Hungary) Péter Kabát	FW	25	16	7	1	2	1			3	4			30	21	7	1
23	(Hungary) András Dombai	GK									2				2			
24	(Hungary) Zoltán Pollák	DF	21	2	3	1	4				3				28	2	3	1
24	(Hungary) Marcell Takács	MF																
25	(Hungary) Gábor Dvorschák	DF									6				6			
26	(Hungary) Wilson Electo	DF	1				3				2				6			
26	(Hungary) László Gyürü	MF					1				4				5			
26	(Hungary) Imre Hibó	MF									4				4			
27	(Hungary) Mohamed Remili	MF	10		2		6	3	2		7	2	3		23	5	7	
28	(Brazil) Jucemar	MF	23		1		5	1	2		6				34	1	3	
29	(Hungary) Bertold Popovics	MF	2				1				1	1			4	1		
29	(Hungary) Ádám Privigyei	DF									4		1		4		1	
31	(Hungary) Dávid Barczi	DF									5				5			
31	(Hungary) Péter Tóth	FW									3				3			
33	(Hungary) Bence Lázár	FW					2				7	1			9	1		
33	(Hungary) Krisztián Simon	MF									6	1			6	1		
34	(Hungary) Artur Papizsanszkij	DF									1				1			
36	(Hungary) Tamás Horváth	GK																
36	(Hungary) Péter Kurucz	GK					1				6				7			
Own goals				2												2		
Totals				61	66	6		17	14	1		28	14	1		106	94	8

=== Hat-tricks ===
No.	Player	Against	Result	Date	Competition
20	(Central African Republic) Foxi Kéthévoama	Bőcs (H)	7–0	22 October 2008	Magyar Kupa

=== Clean sheets ===
			Clean sheets			
No.	Player	Games Played	Nemzeti Bajnokság I	Magyar Kupa	Ligakupa	Total
1	(Hungary) Szabolcs Balajcza	39	10	1	1	12
36	(Hungary) Péter Kurucz	7		1	1	2
23	(Hungary) András Dombai	2				
36	(Hungary) Tamás Horváth					
Totals			10	2	2	14
