= 2016 OKC Energy FC season =

OKC Energy FC
2016 season
- Chairman: Bob Funk, Jr.
- Manager: Jimmy Nielsen
- Stadium: Taft Stadium
- USL Playoffs: Conference Semi-finals vs Vancouver Whitecaps FC 2
- U.S. Open Cup: Fourth round vs FC Dallas
- Top goalscorer: Wojciech Wojcik (4)
- Highest home attendance: League: 6,455 (Apr.9 vs. Saint Louis); All: 7,075 (Feb. 27 vs. Dallas)
- Lowest home attendance: 3,753 (Aug. 2 vs. Sacramento)
- Average home league attendance: League: 4,950; All: 5,140
Home colors	Away colors

The 2016 Oklahoma City Energy FC season was the club's third season in existence, and their third season playing in the United Soccer League (USL), the third tier of the American soccer pyramid.

== Background ==
This is the second season where Oklahoma City Energy FC plays its full season at Taft Stadium. KSBI-TV will air all Energy FC matches this season. Energy FC qualified for the playoffs again this season as a 7th seed but lost to Vancouver Whitecaps FC 2 in the Conference Semi-finals.

== Roster ==
As of 8/20/2016

No.	Position	Nation	Player
1	GK	PUR	Cody Laurendi
2	DF	USA	Jacob VanCompernolle (on loan from Swope Park Rangers)
3	DF	USA	Kyle Hyland
4	DF	CMR	Cyprian Hedrick
6	MF	USA	Jose Cuevas (on loan from Arizona United SC)
7	MF	DEN	Sebastian Dalgaard
8	DF	USA	Michael Thomas
9	FW	DEN	Danni König
10	FW	NED	Tim Janssen
12	MF	USA	Daniel Gonzalez
13	FW	SWE	Linus Olsson
14	MF	USA	Coy Craft (on loan from FC Dallas)
15	DF	GER	Timo Pitter (on loan from FC Dallas)
16	GK	USA	Jacob Lissek
17	MF	HUN	Péter Tóth
18	GK	USA	C. J. Cochran
19	DF	USA	Michael Harris
20	FW	USA	Daniel Jackson
21	FW	ENG	Jordan Rideout
22	DF	USA	Kalen Ryden
23	MF	MEX	Luis Martinez
24	GK	USA	Ray Clark
25	MF	DEN	Michael Byskov
26	DF	USA	Coady Andrews
27	FW	USA	Colin Bonner (on loan from FC Dallas)
28	FW	POL	Wojciech Wojcik (on loan from Indy Eleven)
30	FW	USA	Andy Craven
32	DF	USA	Devante Dubose

== Competitions ==
February 12, 2016 Friendly	New York City FC	1–0	Oklahoma City Energy FC	Bradenton, Florida
12:00 PM CST	Villa 18'	Report		Stadium: IMG Academy

February 17, 2016 Friendly	Oklahoma City Energy FC (United States)	1–0	(Denmark) HB Køge	Bradenton, Florida
2:00 PM CST	Frimpong 58'	Report		Stadium: IMG Academy
Note: Played in two 35-minute halves.

February 21, 2016 Friendly	Oklahoma City Energy FC	1–0	Orlando City B	Bradenton, Florida
12:00 PM CST	Townsend 8'; Ryden (yellow card)	Report		Stadium: IMG Academy

February 27, 2016 Friendly	Oklahoma City Energy FC	1–2	FC Dallas	Oklahoma City, Oklahoma
7:00 PM CST	Byskov (yellow card) 17', (goal) 28'	Report	Harris 5'; Pitter 15'; Ortiz (yellow card) 82'	Stadium: Taft Stadium; Attendance: 7,075

March 6, 2016 Friendly	FC Dallas Reserves	2–1	Oklahoma City Energy FC	Frisco, Texas
4:15 PM CST	Jara 4'; Lizarazo 74' (pen.); Hernandez (red card) 77'	Report	Byskov 16'	Stadium: Toyota Stadium

March 13, 2016 Friendly	Saint Louis FC	0–0	Oklahoma City Energy FC	Springfield, Missouri
2:00 PM CDT		Report		Stadium: Greenwood Field, Lake Country Soccer Complex

March 19, 2016 Friendly	Oklahoma City Energy FC	1–1	Omaha Mavericks	Norman, Oklahoma
2:00 PM CDT	Townsend 21'	Report	Hamadi 56'	Stadium: Norman North Soccer Field

June 28, 2016 Friendly	Oklahoma City Energy FC (United States)	0–1	(Mexico) Chivas	Oklahoma City, Oklahoma
7:00 PM CDT	Dubose (yellow card) 84'	Report	Bravo 29'	Stadium: Taft Stadium; Attendance: 6,687

=== Results summary ===
Overall								Home						Away					
Pld	W	D	L	GF	GA	GD	Pts	W	D	L	GF	GA	GD	W	D	L	GF	GA	GD
30	10	13	7	32	30	+2	43	5	7	3	19	16	+3	5	6	4	13	14	−1

Source: Match reports

Round	1	2	3	4	5	6	7	8	9	10	11	12	13	14	15	16	17	18	19	20	21	22	23	24	25	26	27	28	29	30
Stadium	H	H	H	A	A	H	A	H	A	A	A	H	H	A	A	H	H	A	H	A	H	A	A	H	A	A	H	H	A	H
Result	L	D	W	D	D	D	W	W	W	L	W	D	D	D	W	W	W	D	L	D	D	W	L	W	D	L	D	L	L	D

Updated to match(es) played on February 9, 2016. Source: Match reports
A = Away; H = Home; W = Win; D = Draw; L = Loss

March 26, 2016 1	Oklahoma City Energy FC	1–2	Colorado Springs Switchbacks FC	Oklahoma City, Oklahoma
7:00 PM CDT	Evans (yellow card) 11'; König 63'	Report	Maybin 32'; Gonzalez 54'; Gorrick (yellow card) 85'	Stadium: Taft Stadium; Attendance: 5,646; Referee: Leszek Stalmach

April 9, 2016 2	Oklahoma City Energy FC	2–2	Saint Louis FC	Oklahoma City, Oklahoma
7:00 PM CDT	Dalgaard 9'; Gonzalez (yellow card) 38'; Craft 60'	Report	Cicciarelli 23'; Fink 36', (yellow card) 80'; Bushue (yellow card) 64'	Stadium: Taft Stadium; Attendance: 6,455; Referee: Younes Marrakchi

April 23, 2016 3	Oklahoma City Energy FC	1–0	Swope Park Rangers	Oklahoma City, Oklahoma
7:00 PM CDT	Ryden 79'	Report	Duke (yellow card) 30'; Selbol (yellow card) 63'; Oliveria (yellow card) 82'	Stadium: Taft Stadium; Attendance: 5,690; Referee: Luis Guardia

May 1, 2016 4	Seattle Sounders FC 2	1–1	Oklahoma City Energy FC	Tukwila, Washington
9:00 PM CDT	Mansaray 20', (yellow card) 71'; Schweitzer (yellow card) 62'; Fisher (yellow card) 78' (yellow-red card) 81'	Report	Dalgaard (yellow card) 56'; Craft (yellow card) 59'; Rideout (yellow card) 90', (goal) 90+'	Stadium: Starfire Sports Complex; Referee: Ekaterina Koroleva

May 7, 2016 5	Arizona United SC	0–0	Oklahoma City Energy FC	Peoria, Arizona
9:30 PM CDT	Rooney (yellow card) 73'; Woszcynski (yellow card) 90+'	Report	König (yellow card) 56'; Thomas (yellow card) 90+'; Rideout (yellow card) 90+'	Stadium: Peoria Sports Complex; Attendance: 3,108; Referee: Malik Badawi

May 15, 2016 6	Oklahoma City Energy FC	1–1	San Antonio FC	Oklahoma City, Oklahoma
6:00 PM CDT	König 37'	Report	Garcia 18'	Stadium: Taft Stadium; Attendance: 5,393; Referee: Luigi Lazareno

May 21, 2016 7	San Antonio FC	0–1	Oklahoma City Energy FC	San Antonio, Texas
7:30 PM CDT	Garcia (yellow card) 27'	Report	Bonner 58'; Gonzalez (yellow card) 86'; Byskov (yellow card) 89'	Stadium: Toyota Field; Attendance: 6,165; Referee: Alejandro Mariscal

May 24, 2016 8	Oklahoma City Energy FC	3–1	Real Monarchs SLC	Oklahoma City, Oklahoma
7:00 PM CDT	König 28'; Andrews 37'; Hyland 90+'	Report	Sandoval 23'; McGovern (yellow card) 65'	Stadium: Taft Stadium; Attendance: 4,219; Referee: Greg Dopka

June 4, 2016 9	Tulsa Roughnecks FC	0–2	Oklahoma City Energy FC	Tulsa, Oklahoma
7:00 PM CDT	Peters (yellow card) 73'	Report	Wojcik 21'; Gonzalez 28'; Rideout (yellow card) 85'	Stadium: ONEOK Field; Attendance: 4,913; Referee: Patrick Rosas

June 11, 2016 10	Rio Grande Valley FC Toros	3–0	Oklahoma City Energy FC	Edinburg, Texas
7:30 PM CDT	Escalante 14', (red card) 52'; Murphy 40'; Malki (yellow card) 45'; James (yellow card) 83'; Bird 90+'	Report	Hyland (yellow card) 53'	Stadium: RGVFC Stadium; Referee: Luis Guardia

June 18, 2016 11	Swope Park Rangers	1–3	Oklahoma City Energy FC	Kansas City, Missouri
7:30 PM CDT	Ayrton 8', (yellow card) 38'; Kelly (yellow card) 43'; Ualefi (yellow card) 75'	Report	Thomas 45+'; Wojcik 64'; Gonzalez 74'; König (yellow card) 80'	Stadium: Swope Soccer Village; Attendance: 1,314; Referee: Matthew Kreitzer

June 25, 2016 12	Oklahoma City Energy FC	1–1	Vancouver Whitecaps FC 2	Oklahoma City, Oklahoma
7:00 PM CDT	Craft 45+'; Byskov (yellow card) 63'	Report	Safiu 26'; Flores (yellow card) 77'; Sandhu (yellow card) 90+'	Stadium: Taft Stadium; Attendance: 4,905; Referee: Michael Zapata

July 2, 2016 13	Oklahoma City Energy FC	0–0	Rio Grande Valley FC Toros	Oklahoma City, Oklahoma
7:30 PM CDT	Byskov (yellow card) 62'; Wojcik (yellow card) 67'; Hyland (yellow card) 89'	Report	Bird (yellow card) 45'; Garcia (red card) 70'; James (yellow card) 73'; Rodríguez (yellow card) 90+'	Stadium: Taft Stadium; Attendance: 3,956; Referee: Malik Badawi

July 9, 2016 14	San Antonio FC	0–0	Oklahoma City Energy FC	San Antonio, Texas
7:30 PM CDT	Morgan (yellow card) 21'; Ford (red card) 69'	Report	Dalgaard (yellow card) 60'; Thomas (red card) 69'	Stadium: Toyota Field; Attendance: 5,855; Referee: Younes Marrakchi

July 12, 2016 15	Swope Park Rangers	0–2	Oklahoma City Energy FC	Kansas City, Missouri
7:30 PM CDT	Duke (yellow card) 6'	Report	Craft 84'; Pitter 89'	Stadium: Swope Soccer Village; Attendance: 1,233; Referee: Rosendo Mendoza

July 16, 2016 16	Oklahoma City Energy FC	2–1	Orange County Blues FC	Oklahoma City, Oklahoma
7:30 PM CDT	Thomas 23'; Wojcik 34'; Hedrick (yellow card) 40'; Andrews (yellow card) 58'	Report	Bjurman 26'; Griffiths (yellow card) 39'; Pluntke (yellow card) 89'	Stadium: Taft Stadium; Attendance: 4,513; Referee: Kyle Burkhardt

July 23, 2016 17	Oklahoma City Energy FC	3–0	Tulsa Roughnecks FC	Oklahoma City, Oklahoma
7:30 PM CDT	Thomas 45' (pen.); Dalgaard 52'; Bonner 89'; Byskov (yellow card) 90+'	Report	Ochoa (yellow card) 45' (yellow-red card) 71'; Manhebo (yellow card) 63'; Mata (yellow card) 78'; Schafer (yellow card) 83'	Stadium: Taft Stadium; Referee: Andrew Musashe

July 30, 2016 18	Saint Louis FC	0–0	Oklahoma City Energy FC	Fenton, Missouri
7:30 PM CDT	Roberts (yellow card) 69'	Report	Andrews (yellow card) 35'; Thomas (yellow card) 36'	Stadium: World Wide Technology Soccer Park; Referee: Dule Durasevic

August 2, 2016 19	Oklahoma City Energy FC	0–1	Sacramento Republic FC	Oklahoma City, Oklahoma
7:30 PM CDT	Hyland (yellow card) 54' (yellow-red card) 90+'; Andrews (yellow card) 71'; König (yellow card) 90+'	Report	Kiffe 83'	Stadium: Taft Stadium; Attendance: 3,753; Referee: Luis Guardia

August 6, 2016 20	Rio Grande Valley FC Toros	0–0	Oklahoma City Energy FC	Edinburg, Texas
7:30 PM CDT		Report	Thomas (yellow card) 64'; Olsson (yellow card) 90+'	Stadium: RGVFC Stadium; Referee: Robi Hullner

August 13, 2016 21	Oklahoma City Energy FC	0–0	LA Galaxy II	Oklahoma City, Oklahoma
7:30 PM CDT	Dalgaard (yellow card) 34'; Thomas (yellow card) 43'; Wojcik (yellow card) 83'	Report		Stadium: Taft Stadium; Attendance: 4,216; Referee: Rosendo Mendoza

August 20, 2016 22	Tulsa Roughnecks FC	0–2	Oklahoma City Energy FC	Tulsa, Oklahoma
7:30 PM CDT	Davoren (yellow card) 29'		Pitter 7'; Byskov (yellow card) 56'; König 65'	Stadium: ONEOK Field; Attendance: 4,170; Referee: Jon Freemon

August 24, 2016 23	Colorado Springs Switchbacks FC	2–0	Oklahoma City Energy FC	Colorado Springs, Colorado
8:00 PM CDT	Taeseong (yellow card) 19'; Gonzalez 30'; Durr 90+'	Report	Andrews (yellow card) 21'; Gonzalez (yellow card) 81'	Stadium: Sand Creek Stadium; Referee: Adam Finney

August 27, 2016 24	Oklahoma City Energy FC	1–0	Tulsa Roughnecks FC	Oklahoma City, Oklahoma
8:00 PM CDT	Wojcik 45+'	Report	Manhebo (yellow card) 44'; Khan (yellow card) 68'	Stadium: Taft Stadium; Attendance: 5,933; Referee: Travis Haight

August 31, 2016 25	Saint Louis FC	1–1	Oklahoma City Energy FC	Fenton, Missouri
7:00 PM CDT	Tshuma 20'; David (yellow card) 32'; Musa (yellow card) 76'	Report	Andrews 32'; Gonzalez 58', (yellow card) 66'	Stadium: World Wide Technology Soccer Park; Attendance: 4,209; Referee: Brandon Artis

September 4, 2016 26	Portland Timbers 2	4–0	Oklahoma City Energy FC	Portland, Oregon
9:00 PM CDT	Lewis (yellow card) 28'; Bijev 34' (pen.), 46', (yellow card) 62'; Bodily 71'; Williams 74' (pen.)	Report		Stadium: Merlo Field; Attendance: 1,732; Referee: Baboucarr Jallow

September 11, 2016 27	Oklahoma City Energy FC	2–2	Seattle Sounders FC 2	Oklahoma City, Oklahoma
6:00 PM CDT	Hyland 11'; König (yellow card) 41'; Olsson 59'	Report	Ojong (yellow card) 45'; Alfaro (yellow card) 41', (goal) 90+'; Mansaray 55'	Stadium: Taft Stadium; Referee: Nima Saghafi

September 18, 2016 28	Oklahoma City Energy FC	0–3	Swope Park Rangers	Oklahoma City, Oklahoma
6:00 PM CDT	Hedrick (yellow card) 58'	Report	Kelly 16'; Gonzalez 25'; Pasher 37'; Tyrpak (yellow card) 43'; Zendejas (yellow card) 45'	Stadium: Taft Stadium; Attendance: 4,412; Referee: Matt Trotter

September 21, 2016 29	Vancouver Whitecaps FC 2	2–1	Oklahoma City Energy FC	Langley, British Columbia
9:00 PM CDT	Bustos 16' (pen.), 74' (yellow card) 81'; Chung (yellow card) 30'	Report	Wojcik (yellow card) 22'; Byskov (yellow card) 30'; Andrews (yellow card) 40'; Thomas 81'	Stadium: McLeod Athletic Park; Attendance: 1,183

September 24, 2016 30	Oklahoma City Energy FC	2–2	Saint Louis FC	Oklahoma City, Oklahoma
6:00 PM CDT	Pitter 1'; König 26'; Craven (yellow card) 30'	Report	Roberts (yellow card) 16'; Tshuma 21'; David 23'	Stadium: Taft Stadium; Attendance: 5,712; Referee: Travis Haight

=== First round ===
October 1, 2016	Rio Grande Valley FC Toros	2–3	Oklahoma City Energy FC	Edinburg, Texas
7:30 PM CDT	Luna 34'; Ward (yellow card) 53'; Bird 76'	Report	Ryden (yellow card) 72'; Olsson 72'; Bonner 90+3', 90+5'	Stadium: H-E-B Park; Attendance: 2,701; Referee: Rosendo Mendoza

=== Conference Semi-finals ===
October 8, 2016	Vancouver Whitecaps FC 2	3–2	Oklahoma City Energy FC	Vancouver, British Columbia
2:00 PM CDT	Seymore (yellow card) 21'; Froese 27'; Greig 49'; Haber 89'	Report	Thomas (yellow card) 23'; König 61'; Andrews (yellow card) 62'; Pitter 80'	Stadium: Thunderbird Stadium; Attendance: 1,308; Referee: Pierre-Luc Lauziere

==== Standings ====
Pos	Team	Pld	W	D	L	GF	GA	GD	Pts	Qualification
5	LA Galaxy II	30	12	11	7	52	42	+10	47	Conference Playoffs
6	Vancouver Whitecaps 2	30	12	9	9	44	44	0	45	Conference Playoffs
7	Oklahoma City Energy	30	10	13	7	32	30	+2	43	Conference Playoffs
8	Orange County Blues	30	12	4	14	39	41	−2	40	Conference Playoffs
9	Portland Timbers 2	30	12	4	14	38	42	−4	40	

Source: 2016 USL Standings
Rules for classification: 1) total wins; 2) total goal differential; 3) total goals scored; 4) points earned against top four Conference finishers; 5) disciplinary points; 6) coin toss or drawing of lots

=== U.S. Open Cup ===
Oklahoma City Energy FC will enter Open Cup in the second round.

May 18 Second round	Mississippi Brilla	0–0 (a.e.t.) (9–10 p)	Oklahoma City Energy FC	Clinton, Mississippi
7:00 PM CDT		Report		Stadium: Traceway Park

June 1 Third round	Rayo OKC	1–2 (a.e.t.)	Oklahoma City Energy FC	Yukon, Oklahoma
8:00 PM CDT	Juanan (yellow card) 40'; Forbes 43'; Boateng (yellow card) 115' (red card); Michel (red card) 119'		Thomas (yellow card) 11'; Cuevas (yellow card) 36'; Dalgaard 45+'; Hyland 107'; Laurendi (yellow card) 119'	Stadium: Miller Stadium; Attendance: 4,385; Referee: Andrew Musashe

June 15 Fourth round	FC Dallas	2–2 (a.e.t.) (6–5 p)	Oklahoma City Energy FC	Dallas, Texas
7:30 PM CDT	Ortiz (yellow card) 34'; Lizarazo 38', 44'	Report	Rideout 26'; König (yellow card) 87'; Thomas 90'; Harris (yellow card) 105'; Tóth (yellow card) 118'	Stadium: Westcott Field; Referee: Guido Gonzalez Jr.
	Penalties
	(penalty scored) Lizarazo; (penalty scored) Acosta; (penalty scored) Díaz; (penalty missed) Hedges; (penalty scored) Harris; (penalty scored) Ortiz; (penalty scored) Bonner		König (penalty scored); Cuevas (penalty scored); Thomas (penalty scored); Wojcik (penalty missed); Tóth (penalty scored); Andrews (penalty scored); Hendrick (penalty missed)

== Transfers ==
=== Loans in ===
Start date	End date	Position	No.	Player	From club
8 April 2016	8 October 2016	MF	6	(United States) Jose Cuevas	(United States) Arizona United SC
8 April 2016	31 July 2016	MF	14	(United States) Coy Craft	(United States) FC Dallas
29 April 2016	8 October 2016	F	27	(United States) Colin Bonner	(United States) FC Dallas
18 May 2016	8 October 2016	F	28	(Poland) Wojciech Wojcik	(United States) Indy Eleven
28 June 2016	8 October 2016	D	2	(United States) Jacob VanCompernolle	(United States) Swope Park Rangers
28 June 2016	8 October 2016	D	15	(Germany) Timo Pitter	(United States) FC Dallas
