= Byskov =

Byskov is a surname. Notable people with the surname include:

- Michael Byskov (born 1988), Danish footballer
- Valdemar Byskov (born 2005), Danish footballer
