= Péter Tóth (footballer, born 1989) =

Hungarian footballer

Personal information
- Date of birth: April 17, 1989 (age 37)
- Place of birth: Budapest, Hungary
- Height: 1.83 m (6 ft 0 in)
- Positions: Forward; attacking midfielder

Youth career
- 2002–2004: Pécs
- 2004–2005: MTK
- 2005–2006: Újpest

Senior career*
Years	Team	Apps	(Gls)
2006–2009	Újpest	0	(0)
2007–2009	Újpest II	27	(5)
2009	Újbuda	10	(5)
2009–2011	Nea Salamis Famagusta	9	(0)
2011	Honvéd II	2	(0)
2011–2012	Rákospalota	25	(6)
2012–2013	Zalaegerszeg	7	(1)
2015–2016	Oklahoma City Energy	26	(2)
Total		106	(19)

International career
2005–2006	Hungary U17	6	(1)
- * Club domestic league appearances and goals

Péter Tóth (born 17 April 1989) is a Hungarian former professional footballer who played as a midfielder.

== Club career ==
Tóth played with Hungarian sides Újpest, Honvéd, Rákospalota and Zalaegerszeg between 2008 and 2013, before moving to the United States to join USL side Oklahoma City Energy.

Ahead of the 2017 season, OKC Energy decided not to extend his contract.

== International career ==
Tóth has represented Hungary at youth international levels, featuring for the U17s. He played at the 2006 UEFA European Under-17 Championship after a strong qualification campaign.

== Career statistics ==
Appearances and goals by club, season and competition
Club	Season	League			National cup (Note: Includes Magyar Kupa, U.S. Open Cup)		League cup (Note: Includes Ligakupa)		Total	
Club	Season	Division	Apps	Goals	Apps	Goals	Apps	Goals	Apps	Goals
Újpest	2006–07	Nemzeti Bajnokság I	0	0	—		—		0	0
Újpest	2007–08	Nemzeti Bajnokság I	—		—		1	0	1	0
Újpest	2008–09	Nemzeti Bajnokság I	—		—		3	0	3	0
Újpest	Total		0	0	—		4	0	4	0
Újpest II	2007–08	Nemzeti Bajnokság III	18	3	—		—		18	3
Újpest II	2008–09	Nemzeti Bajnokság III	9	2	2	0	—		11	2
Újpest II	Total		27	5	2	0	—		29	5
Újbuda	2008–09	Nemzeti Bajnokság III	10	5	—		—		10	5
Nea Salamis Famagusta	2009–10	Cypriot First Division	9	0	—		—		9	0
Honvéd II	2010–11	Nemzeti Bajnokság II	2	0	—		—		2	0
Rákospalota	2011–12	Nemzeti Bajnokság II	25	6	1	0	—		26	6
Zalaegerszeg	2012–13	Nemzeti Bajnokság II	7	1	2	4	3	2	12	7
Oklahoma City Energy	2015	USL	20	2	2	1	—		22	3
Oklahoma City Energy	2016	USL	6	0	2	0	—		8	0
Oklahoma City Energy	Total		26	2	4	1	—		30	3
Career total			106	19	9	5	7	2	122	26
