= Ivan Dudić =

Serbian footballer

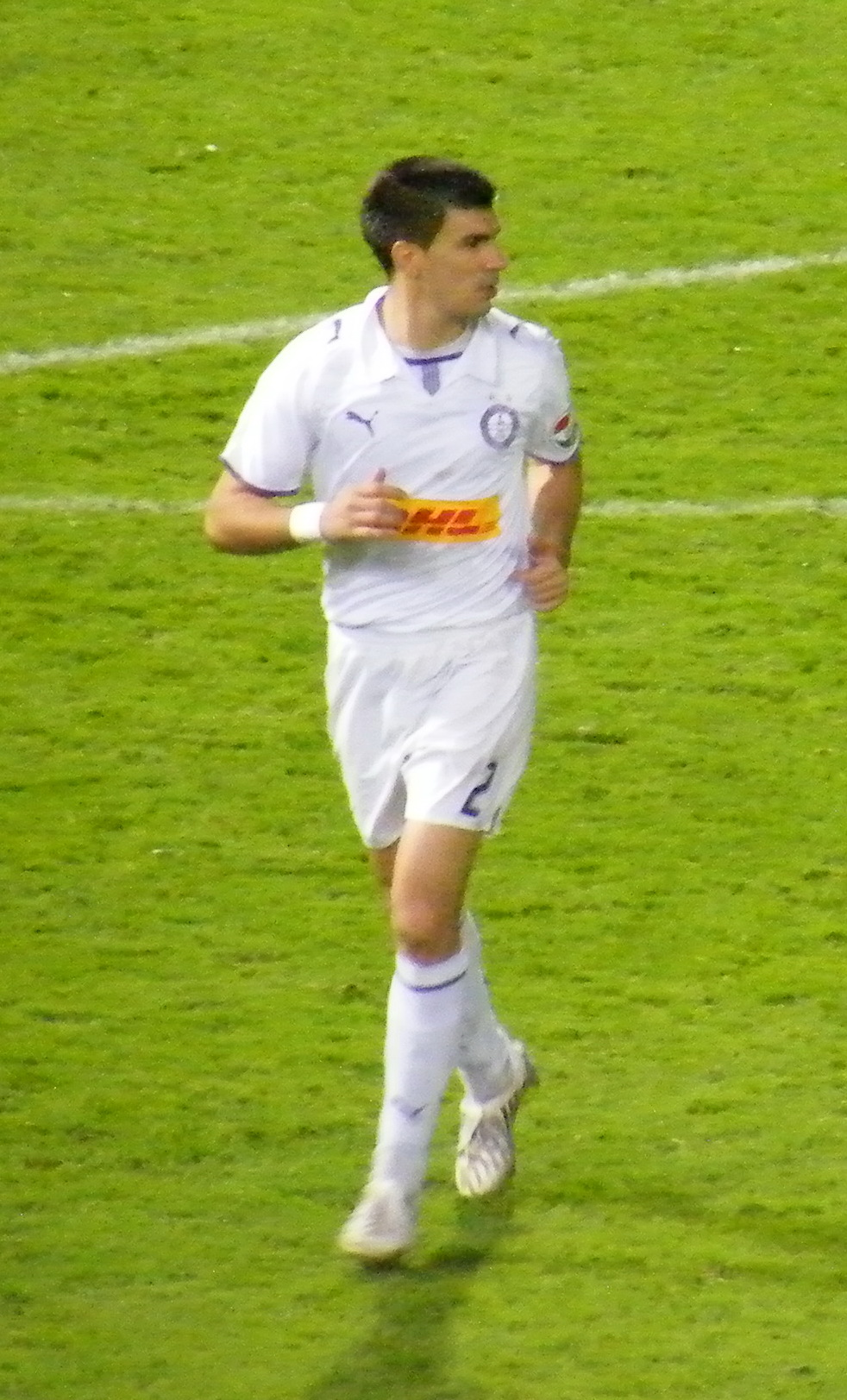
- Dudić playing for Újpest in 2008

Personal information
- Full name: Ivan Dudić
- Date of birth: 13 February 1977 (age 49)
- Place of birth: Zemun, SFR Yugoslavia
- Height: 1.80 m (5 ft 11 in)
- Position: Right-back

Youth career
- Red Star Belgrade

Senior career*
Years	Team	Apps	(Gls)
1995–2000	Red Star Belgrade	65	(0)
1996–1997	→ Jedinstvo Paraćin (loan)		
1998	→ Železnik (loan)	7	(0)
2000–2005	Benfica	20	(0)
2002–2003	→ Rad (loan)	0	(0)
2005–2006	Mons	27	(0)
2006–2007	Bežanija	7	(0)
2007	Zalaegerszeg	12	(0)
2008–2010	Újpest	50	(1)
Total		188	(1)

International career
2000–2001	FR Yugoslavia	7	(0)
- * Club domestic league appearances and goals

Ivan Dudić (Serbian Cyrillic: Иван Дудић, born 13 February 1977) is a Serbian retired footballer who played as a right-back.

He represented several clubs, including Red Star Belgrade, Benfica and Újpest FC. He was an international for FR Yugoslavia, receiving 7 caps and participating in the UEFA Euro 2000.

== Club career ==
Born in Zemun, Dudić started at Red Star Belgrade, from whom he debut in 1995, appearing in just one game as Red Star finished second in the league. After spending the next season on loan with Jedinstvo Paraćin, he returned to Red Star and appeared in six more matches in the first half of the 1997–98 season. In the winter of 1998, he was sent on a six-month loan to Železnik. His breakthrough arrived upon return to Red Star in 1998 at age 21, playing the majority of the league matches in 1998–99 and 1999–2000, winning the title in the latter.

His performance attracted attention from abroad, with Benfica signing him on 18 May 2000, for a fee that Record announced to be in the region of €2M. Dudić was scouted by Michel Preud'homme on two different games: 29 March 2000 in a Euro under-21 qualification match against England and in the eternal derby on 2 April, receiving positive feedback on both times. His signing was meant to solve the problematic right-back position that was occupied on different spells by either, Okonuwo, Andrade or Ricardo Esteves, but Dudić struggled to perform to expectations, playing just 20 league games and being transfer listed within a year.

He refused to play for Benfica B, saying: "I do not care about that! I am a Benfica player, but I want to play in a club that allows me to progress in my career.". He later acknowledged receiving interest from Tottenham, Leeds United, West Ham and Everton, but could not get the necessary workers permit, so he spent the entire 2001–02 season without playing.

On 14 August 2002, he agreed a loan deal to Rad, a club competing in the First League of FR Yugoslavia. He returned to Benfica in July 2003, but was only released on 29 January 2005, after spending 18 months sidelined on the reserve team. Dudić immediately joined Mons and helped them win the Belgian Second Division. He later passed through Bežanija, Zalaegerszeg, finally settling at Újpest, retiring after two seasons.

== International career ==
Dudić played six matches for FR Yugoslavia under-21 in the 2000 UEFA European Under-21 Championship qualification, including the playoff against England, losing 3–0. He was selected by Vujadin Boškov for a friendly against China on 25 May 2000, and received his first cap during the match. Just days later, he was confirmed on the squad for the UEFA Euro 2000, playing the opening game against Slovenia on 13 June, in a 3–3 draw. His last appearance for his national team was on 25 April 2001 in match against Russia, for the 2002 FIFA World Cup qualification.
