= Danni König =

Danish footballer (born 1986)

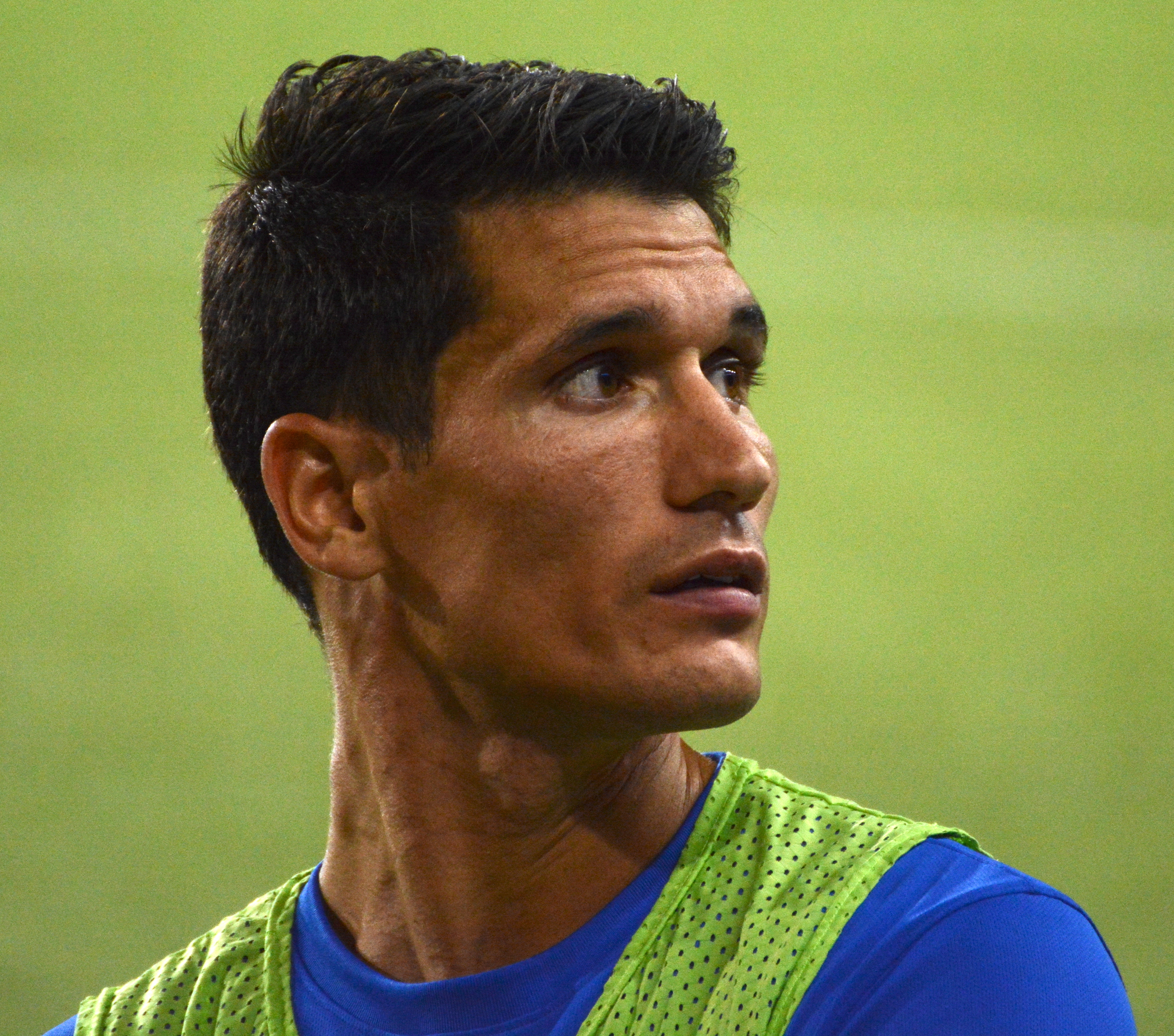
- König with FC Cincinnati in 2017

Personal information
- Full name: Danni König
- Date of birth: 17 December 1986 (age 39)
- Place of birth: Tingbjerg, Denmark
- Height: 1.89 m (6 ft 2 in)
- Position: Forward

Youth career
- –2005: Brønshøj BK

Senior career*
Years	Team	Apps	(Gls)
2005–2009	Randers	7	(0)
2009–2010	Valur	13	(5)
2010–2011	Brønshøj BK	29	(17)
2011–2014	FC Vestsjælland	46	(6)
2013–2014	→ Brønshøj BK (loan)	14	(0)
2015–2017	Oklahoma City Energy	61	(26)
2017–2018	FC Cincinnati	51	(22)
2019	Lyngby BK	13	(4)
2019	Brønshøj BK	10	(1)
Total		254	(81)
- * Club domestic league appearances and goals

Danni König (born 17 December 1986) is a Danish former professional footballer.

== Career ==
Born in Tingbjerg, König played as a youth player with Brønshøj BK U-19 team before signing with the Brønshøj BK pro team in 2005. He played with them for four years before being traded to Randers FC in 2009. In April 2010, he signed with Valur before re-signing with Brønshøj BK in August 2010. He signed with FC Vestsjælland in 2011. On 26 July 2013, König was loaned back to Brønshøj BK. His loan ended on 31 December 2013.

König signed with Oklahoma City Energy FC on 12 February 2015. He was named USL Player of the Week for the week of 7 April 2015.

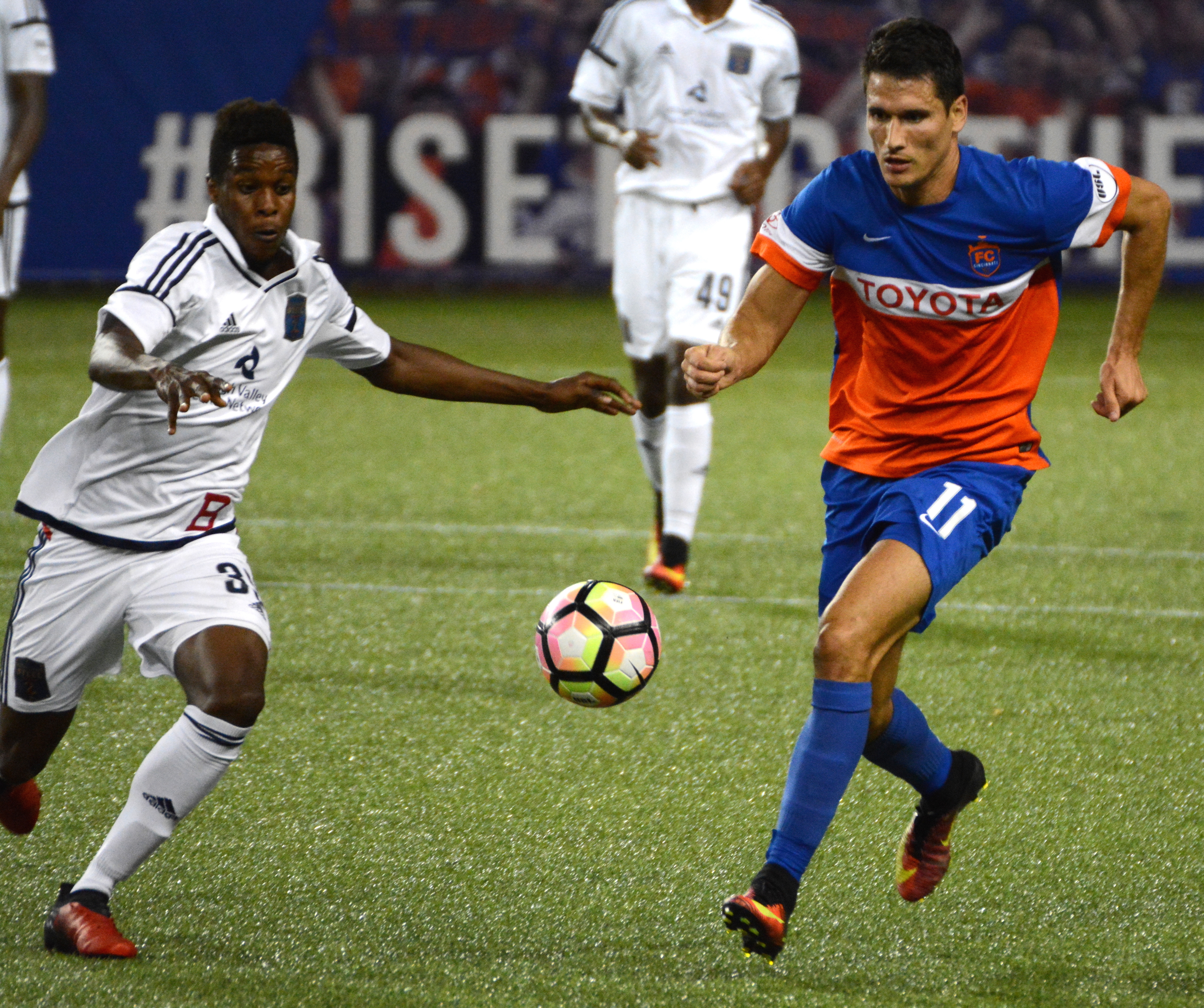
König challenging Bethlehem Steel forward Amoy Brown in 2017

On 10 May 2017, König was traded from Oklahoma City Energy to FC Cincinnati in exchange for Andy Craven. On 25 October 2017, the club confirmed that König would return for the 2018 season.

König signed with Danish 1st Division club Lyngby BK on 31 January 2019 for six months. He left the club at the end of the season.

On 7 July 2019, Brønshøj BK announced that König had returned to the club. On 10 January 2020 it was confirmed, that he had left the club and would retire from football.
