= László Szabó (footballer) =

Hungarian footballer

Personal information
- Full name: László Szabó
- Date of birth: 7 February 1989 (age 37)
- Place of birth: Kapuvár, Hungary
- Height: 1.83 m (6 ft 0 in)
- Position: Left-back

Team information
- Current team: Sopron
- Number: 29

Youth career
- 2003–2004: Győr
- 2004–2008: MTK

Senior career*
Years	Team	Apps	(Gls)
2008–2013	MTK	1	(0)
2008–2010	→ MTK II	40	(14)
2009–2010	→ Pécs (loan)	10	(0)
2010–2011	→ Cegléd (loan)	22	(5)
2011–2013	→ Sopron (loan)	23	(7)
2013–	Sopron	148	(8)
- * Club domestic league appearances and goals as of 7 February 2022

László Szabó (born 7 February 1989) is a Hungarian professional footballer who plays as a left-back for Nemzeti Bajnokság III club Sopron.
