= Jordan Rideout =

English footballer

Personal information
- Date of birth: 26 February 1993 (age 33)
- Place of birth: Southport, England
- Position: Forward

Youth career
- 2007–2010: Sporting Kansas City

College career
Years	Team	Apps	(Gls)
2011–2014	UMKC Kangaroos	66	(28)

Senior career*
Years	Team	Apps	(Gls)
2012–2013	Kansas City Brass	8	(5)
2014	Ventura County Fusion	6	(8)
2015	Arizona United	7	(1)
2016	Oklahoma City Energy FC	21	(7)
- * Club domestic league appearances and goals as of 4 October 2016

Jordan Rideout (born 26 February 1993) is an English footballer. He is the son of former Everton legend Paul Rideout who scored the winning goal in the 1995 FA Cup Final vs. Manchester United.

Jordan Rideout's professional career was cut short after suffering an ankle ligament tear in February 2017 while with Saint Louis FC (USL Championship). Rideout played 6 games for Saint Louis FC including the inaugural match that opened Exploria Stadium against Orlando City in a team with Kaka and Nocerino (MLS).

== Career ==
=== College and amateur ===
Rideout spent time with Sporting Kansas City youth team for four years, before playing college soccer for four years at the University of Missouri-Kansas City.

While at college, Rideout appeared for USL PDL side Kansas City Brass in 2012 and 2013, and later Ventura County Fusion in 2014.

=== Professional ===
Rideout signed his first professional contract with United Soccer League club Arizona United on 19 May 2015. He signed with Oklahoma City Energy FC the following season.

== Personal life ==
Rideout is the son of, Paul, who played professional football for the likes Swindon Town, Aston Villa, Bari, Southampton, Everton and Kansas City Wizards.
