= András Gál =

Hungarian footballer

Personal information
- Full name: András Gál
- Date of birth: 20 April 1989 (age 37)
- Place of birth: Budapest, Hungary
- Height: 1.83 m (6 ft 0 in)
- Position: Defender

Team information
- Current team: SV Petzenkirchen
- Number: 8

Youth career
- 2000–2003: BVSC
- 2003: Vasas
- 2003–2008: MTK

Senior career*
Years	Team	Apps	(Gls)
2008–2012	MTK	29	(1)
2012–2013	Siófok	23	(0)
2013–2017	SV Scheibbs	123	(23)
2017–2019	Union Kopfing	22	(7)
2019–	SV Petzenkirchen		

International career
2006–2007	Hungary U-17	?	(?)
2007–2008	Hungary U-19	?	(?)
2008–2009	Hungary U-20	3	(1)
- * Club domestic league appearances and goals as of 2 June 2013

András Gál (born 20 May 1989, in Budapest) is a Hungarian football player who plays for Austrian club SV Petzenkirchen.

== Career statistics ==
Appearances and goals by club, season and competition
Club	Season	League			Cup		League Cup		Europe		Total	
Club	Season	Division	Apps	Goals	Apps	Goals	Apps	Goals	Apps	Goals	Apps	Goals
MTK
MTK	2007–08	Nemzeti Bajnokság I	0	0	0	0	4	0	0	0	4	0
MTK	2008–09	Nemzeti Bajnokság I	0	0	1	0	3	1	0	0	4	0
MTK	2009–10	Nemzeti Bajnokság I	0	0	3	0	8	0	0	0	11	0
MTK	2010–11	Nemzeti Bajnokság I	15	1	2	0	3	0	0	0	20	1
MTK	2011–12	Nemzeti Bajnokság II	13	0	2	1	8	0	0	0	23	1
MTK	Total		28	0	8	1	26	1	0	0	62	2
Siófok	2012–13	Nemzeti Bajnokság I	23	0	1	0	3	0	0	0	27	0
Career total			51	0	9	1	29	1	0	0	89	2

Updated to games played as of 2 June 2013.
