= Sándor Hidvégi =

Hungarian footballer

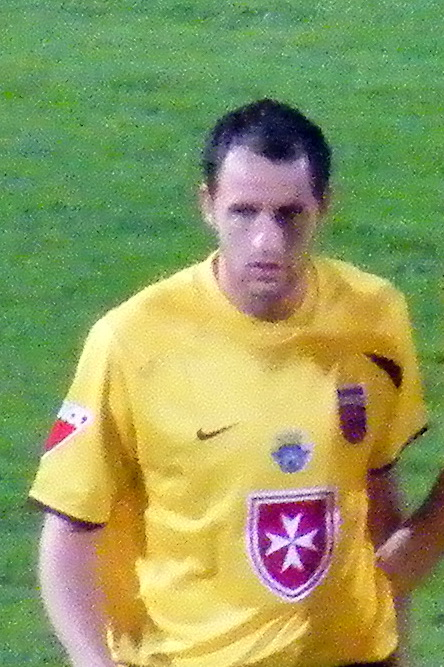
- Sándor Hidvégi Hungarian football player, 2010

Personal information
- Full name: Sándor Hidvégi
- Date of birth: 9 April 1983 (age 43)
- Place of birth: Budapest, Hungary
- Height: 1.82 m (5 ft 11 1/2 in)
- Position: Defender

Youth career
- 2003–2004: Rákosszentmihály

Senior career*
Years	Team	Apps	(Gls)
2004–2005	Győr	0	(0)
2006–2007	Soroksár	6	(0)
2007–2009	Jászberény	40	(3)
2009–2010	MTK	42	(2)
2010–2011	Videoton	10	(0)
2011–2012	Zalaegerszeg	19	(0)
2012–2013	MTK	30	(3)
2013–2014	Ferencváros	3	(0)
2014–2015	→ MTK (loan)	13	(1)
2015	Dunaújváros	12	(1)
2015–2016	Szigetszentmiklósi TK	1	(0)
2016–2017	Szombathelyi Haladás	2	(0)
2017–2019	BFC Siófok	34	(1)
- * Club domestic league appearances and goals as of 27 March 2019

Sándor Hidvégi (born 9 April 1983, in Budapest) is a Hungarian football player who most recently played for BFC Siófok.
