= Dániel Hauser =

Hungarian footballer

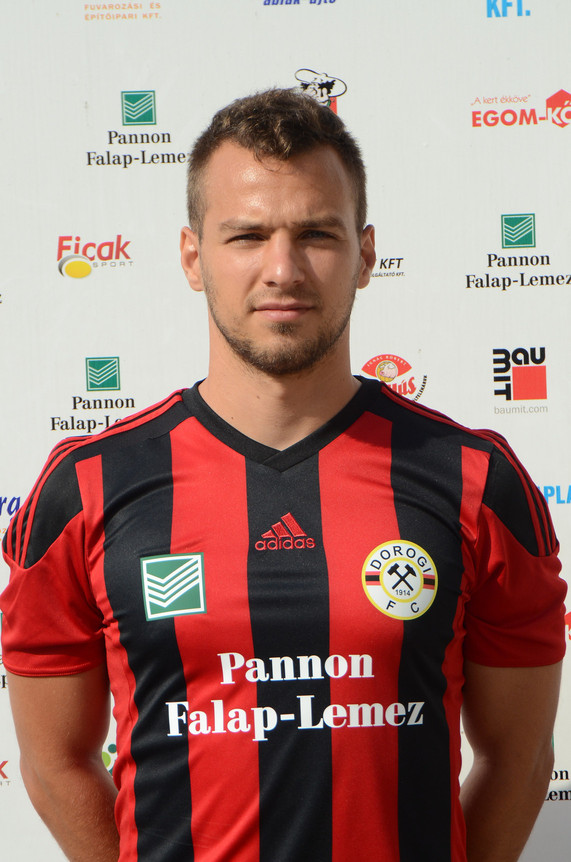

Personal information
- Full name: Dániel Hauser
- Date of birth: 22 August 1986 (age 40)
- Place of birth: Budapest, Hungary
- Height: 1.82 m (5 ft 11 1/2 in)
- Position: Midfielder

Team information
- Current team: MTK Hungária FC
- Number: 3

Senior career*
Years	Team	Apps	(Gls)
2005–	MTK Hungária FC	5	(0)
2006–2008	→ Soroksár SC (loan)	56	(0)
2008–	→ MTK Budapest FC II	29	(0)

International career
2002–2003	Hungary U-17	15	(0)
- * Club domestic league appearances and goals as of 27 March 2010

Dániel Hauser (born 22 August 1986) is a Hungarian football player who currently plays for MTK Hungária FC.

In the 2002/03 season, he was a member of the Hungary under -17 squad that reach the 2003 UEFA European Under-17 Football Championship.

== Honours ==
Hungary
UEFA European Under-17 Football Championship:
Final Tournament 2003
