= András Dombai =

Hungarian footballer

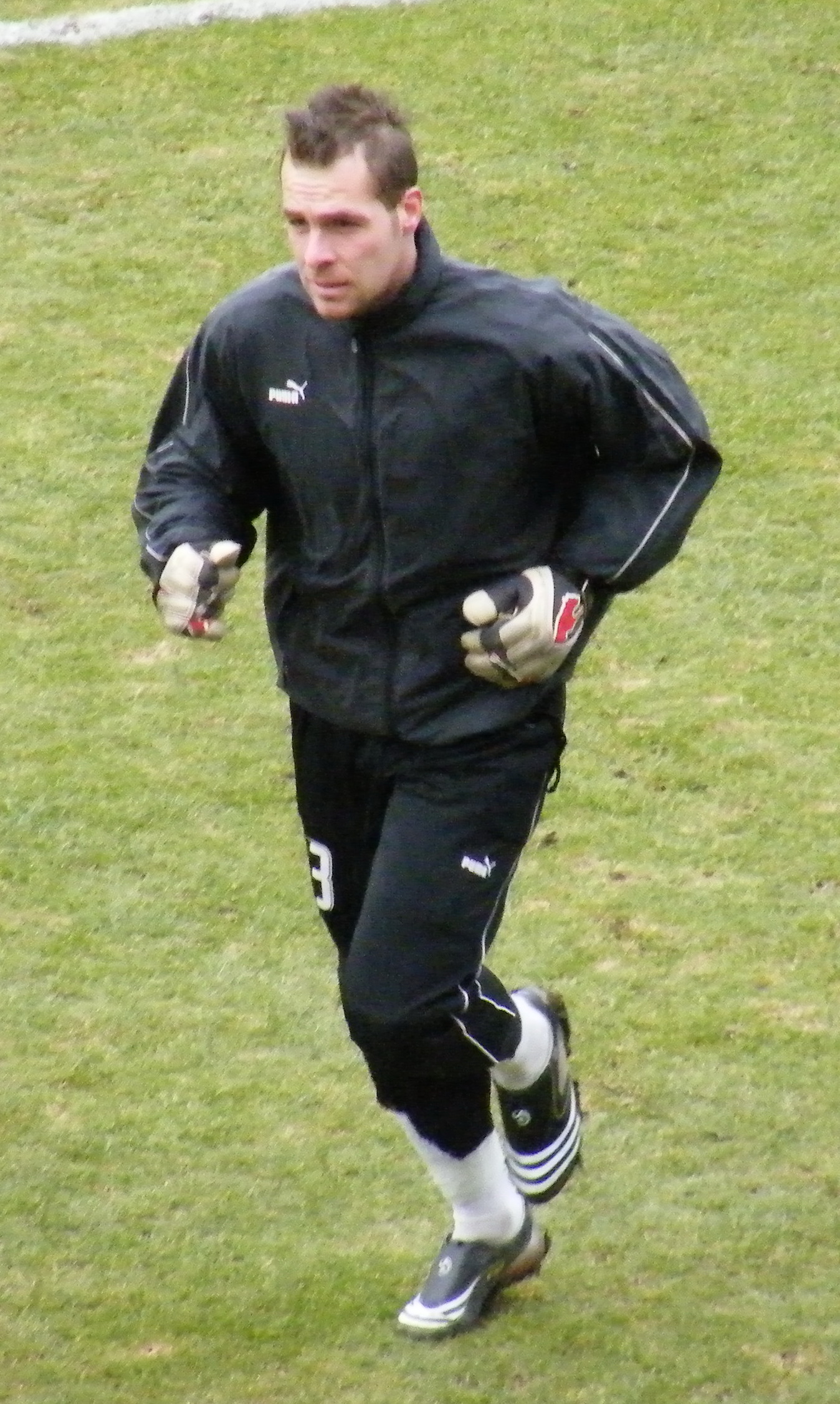

Personal information
- Full name: András Dombai
- Date of birth: 17 September 1979 (age 47)
- Place of birth: Tatabánya, Hungary
- Height: 1.89 m (6 ft 2 in)
- Position: Goalkeeper

Team information
- Current team: Tatabánya

Youth career
- 2002–2004: Haladás

Senior career*
Years	Team	Apps	(Gls)
2004–2005	Haladás	0	(0)
2004–2005	→ Mosonmagyaróvári TE (loan)	23	(0)
2005–2007	Pápa	11	(0)
2006–2007	→ Budafoki LC (loan)	21	(0)
2007–2009	Újpest	0	(0)
2009–2015	Tatabánya	123	(0)
2015–2019	Nickelsdorf		
2019–	Tatabánya		
- * Club domestic league appearances and goals as of 9 May 2015

András Dombai (born 17 September 1979) is a Hungarian footballer who currently plays as a goalkeeper for FC Tatabánya.
