= Josip Ćutuk =

Bosnian-Herzegovinian footballer

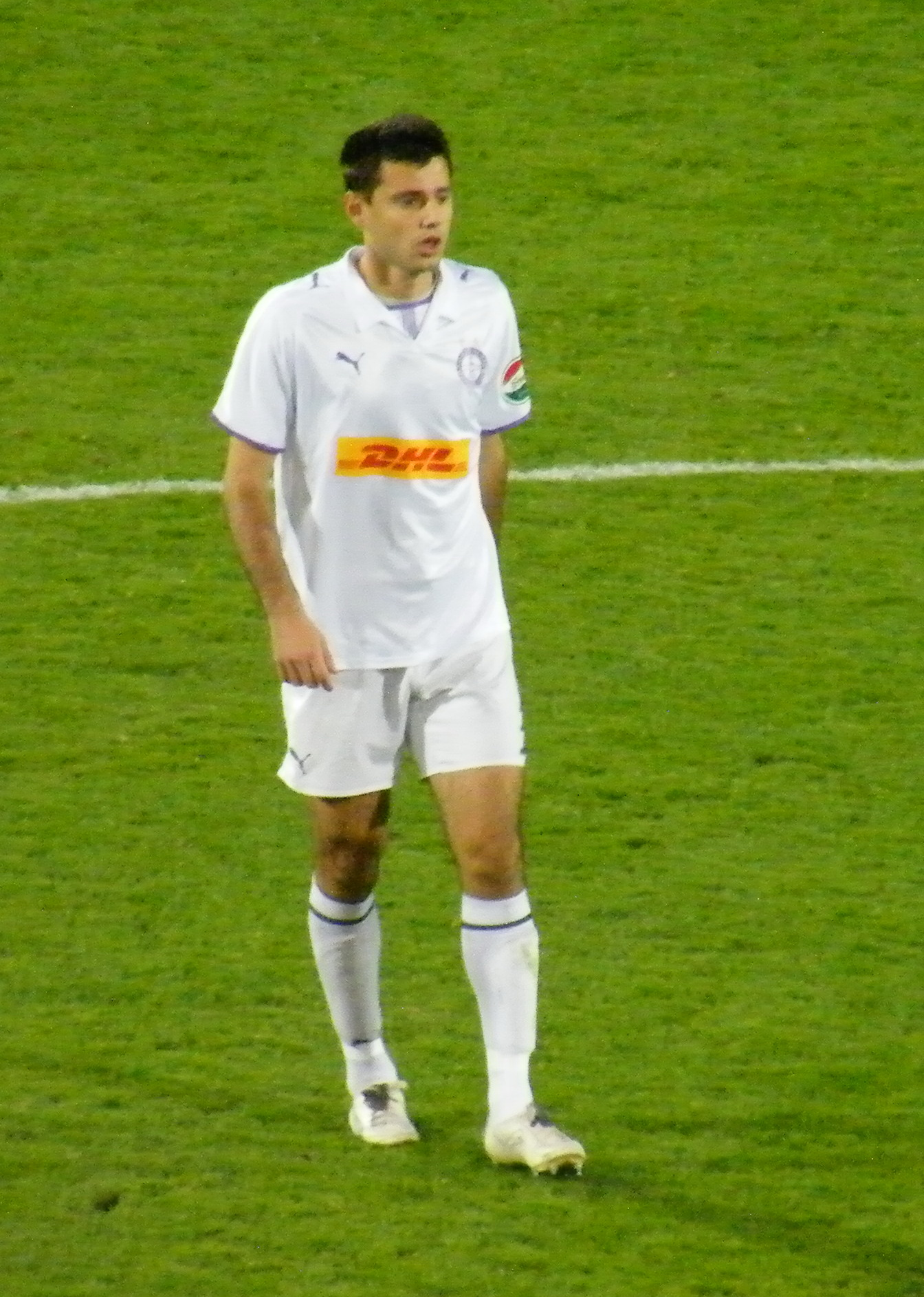

Personal information
- Full name: Josip Ćutuk
- Date of birth: 4 May 1985 (age 41)
- Place of birth: Mostar, SFR Yugoslavia (now Bosnia and Herzegovina)
- Height: 1.95 m (6 ft 5 in)
- Position: Defender

Youth career
- 1992-2000: HNK Grude
- 2000-2002: HNK Brotnjo Čitluk
- 2002–2004: Hajduk Split

Senior career*
Years	Team	Apps	(Gls)
2001-2002	Brotnjo Čitluk	20	(2)
2004-2006	Hajduk Split	36	(6)
2005	→ Žepče (loan)	15	(2)
2006–2007	Kamen Ingrad	17	(0)
2007–2008	Imotski	34	(5)
2008–2009	Újpest	23	(6)
2009–2011	Široki Brijeg	54	(2)
2011–2013	Željezničar	23	(3)
2013–2014	Zmaj Makarska		
2015	RWB Adria	8	(3)
- * Club domestic league appearances and goals as of 10 January 2018

Josip Ćutuk (born 4 May 1985) is a Bosnian-Herzegovinian footballer who most recently played as a defender for RWB Adria.
