= Michael Byskov =

Danish footballer (born 1988)

Personal information
- Full name: Michael Byskov
- Date of birth: 20 February 1988 (age 38)
- Place of birth: Denmark
- Height: 1.89 m (6 ft 2 in)
- Position: Midfielder

Team information
- Current team: AaB II (player-assistant)

Youth career
- Randers FC

Senior career*
Years	Team	Apps	(Gls)
2009–2010	Randers FC	4	(0)
2010–2015	Vendyssel	114	(13)
2015	Skive	8	(1)
2015–2016	Oklahoma City Energy	42	(0)
2017–2019	Jammerbugt FC	63	(6)
2019–	AaB II	0	(0)

Managerial career
- 2019–: AaB II (player-assistant)
- * Club domestic league appearances and goals as of 19:30, 31 July 2019 (UTC)

Michael Byskov (born 20 February 1988) is a Danish professional footballer who plays for the reserve team of AaB as a playing assistant manager.
