= Jucemar Gaucho =

Brazilian footballer

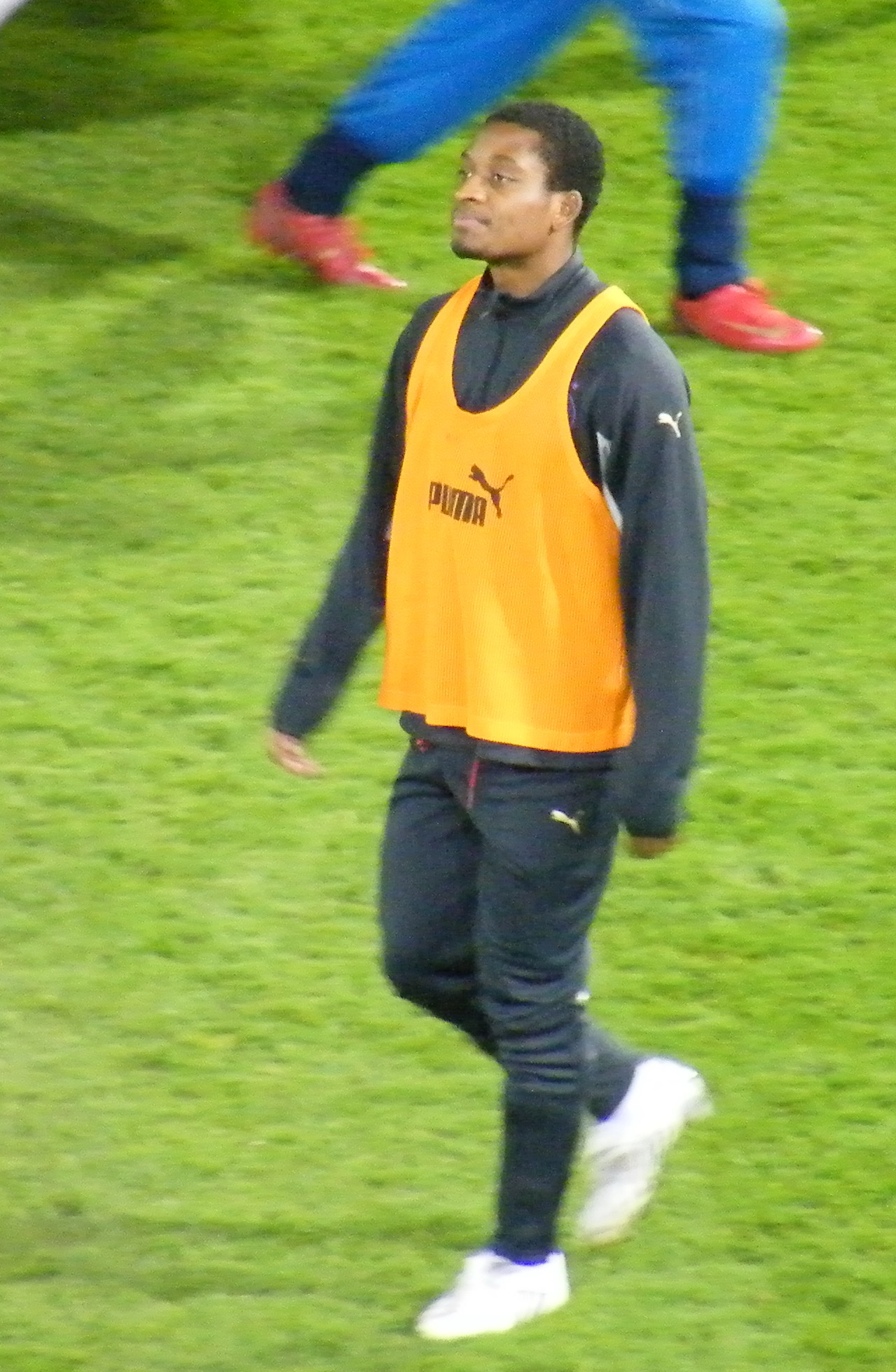

Personal information
- Full name: Jucemar Décio Ribeiro da Silva
- Date of birth: 10 August 1986 (age 40)
- Place of birth: Brazil
- Height: 1.74 m (5 ft 8 1/2 in)
- Position: Midfielder

Team information
- Current team: Lajeadense

Senior career*
Years	Team	Apps	(Gls)
–2008	Grêmio Esportivo Sapucaiense		
2008–2010	Újpest FC	31	(0)
2010	→ Pelotas (loan)		
2011	Villa Nova		
2011	Luverdense	1	(0)
2011-2012	Lajeadense		
2012	CSA		
2012, 2013	CRB		
2013	Veranopolis		
2014	Duque		
- * Club domestic league appearances and goals as of 30 April 2012

Jucemar Décio Ribeiro da Silva, known as Jucemar Gaucho, is a retired Brazilian footballer who last played for Sapucaiense.

Jucemar played for CRB in Serie B during 2012, on loan from CSA.
