= László Zsidai =

Hungarian footballer

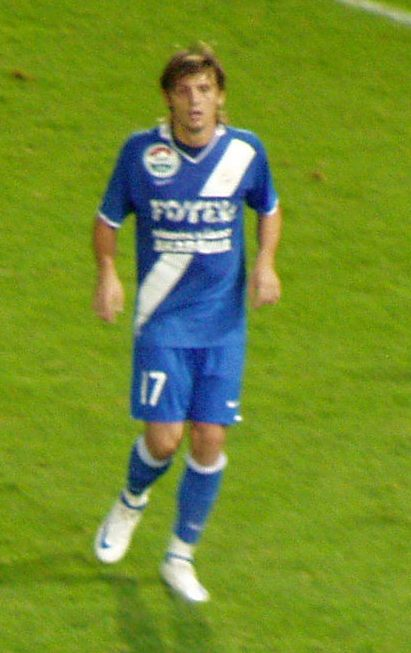

Personal information
- Date of birth: 16 July 1986 (age 40)
- Place of birth: Szombathely, Hungary
- Height: 1.79 m (5 ft 10 in)
- Position: Defensive midfielder

Team information
- Current team: Budaörs
- Number: 6

Youth career
- Bodajk
- 2002–2003: MTK Budapest

Senior career*
| Years | Team | Apps | (Gls) |
| 2003–2013 | MTK | 156 | (6) |
| 2004–2005 | → Siófok (loan) | 24 | (0) |
| 2010–2011 | → Volendam (loan) | 34 | (2) |
| 2013–2015 | Debrecen | 54 | (5) |
| 2016–2019 | Puskás Akadémia | 49 | (1) |
| 2019 | Paks | 8 | (0) |
| 2019– | Budaörs | 36 | (8) |

International career
| 2007–2014 | Hungary | 3 | (0) |
- * Club domestic league appearances and goals as of 7 February 2022

László Zsidai (born 16 July 1986) is a Hungarian footballer who plays for Budaörs and the Hungary national team. He usually plays as a defensive midfielder, and can also play as a defender.

On 19 June 2013, he signed for Debreceni VSC. He commented that he wants to win the Hungarian Championship and he didn't see a chance for that with MTK Budapest FC. Szombathelyi Haladás also wanted to sign the centre defensive midfielder but he chose Debreceni VSC] to reach his goal. He previously played for BFC Siofok, FC Volendam, Debrecen and Puskas Akademia FC. Full international since 2007, he has earned three caps for this country.

== International career ==
Zsidai made his first international appearance in February 2007 in a match against the Latvia national team. Hungary won 2–0. He later played several matches for qualifiers Euro 2016. He was named to the national squad but was cut before the tournament began.

== Career statistics ==
Appearances and goals by club, season and competition
| Club | Season | League | | | Cup | | League Cup | | Europe | | Total | |
| Club | Season | Division | Apps | Goals | Apps | Goals | Apps | Goals | Apps | Goals | Apps | Goals |
|---|---|---|---|---|---|---|---|---|---|---|---|---|
| Siófok | 2004–05 | Nemzeti Bajnokság II | 24 | 0 | 3 | 0 | 0 | 0 | 0 | 0 | 27 | 0 |
MTK
| MTK | 2005–06 | Nemzeti Bajnokság I | 16 | 0 | 0 | 0 | 0 | 0 | 0 | 0 | 16 | 0 |
| MTK | 2006–07 | Nemzeti Bajnokság I | 17 | 0 | 3 | 0 | 0 | 0 | 0 | 0 | 20 | 0 |
| MTK | 2007–08 | Nemzeti Bajnokság I | 26 | 1 | 0 | 0 | 5 | 0 | 0 | 0 | 31 | 1 |
| MTK | 2008–09 | Nemzeti Bajnokság I | 29 | 1 | 7 | 0 | 3 | 0 | 2 | 0 | 41 | 1 |
| MTK | 2009–10 | Nemzeti Bajnokság I | 21 | 3 | 4 | 1 | 2 | 1 | 0 | 0 | 27 | 5 |
| MTK | 2011–12 | Nemzeti Bajnokság II | 19 | 1 | 6 | 1 | 2 | 0 | 0 | 0 | 27 | 2 |
| MTK | 2012–13 | Nemzeti Bajnokság I | 28 | 0 | 1 | 0 | 2 | 0 | 2 | 0 | 33 | 0 |
| MTK | Total | | 156 | 6 | 21 | 2 | 14 | 1 | 4 | 0 | 195 | 9 |
| Volendam | 2010–11 | Eerste Divisie | 32 | 1 | 2 | 1 | 0 | 0 | 0 | 0 | 34 | 2 |
Debrecen
| Debrecen | 2013–14 | Nemzeti Bajnokság I | 29 | 2 | 1 | 0 | 0 | 0 | 2 | 0 | 32 | 2 |
| Debrecen | 2014–15 | Nemzeti Bajnokság I | 12 | 2 | 3 | 0 | 8 | 0 | 6 | 0 | 29 | 2 |
| Debrecen | 2015–16 | Nemzeti Bajnokság I | 13 | 1 | 0 | 0 | — | | 4 | 0 | 17 | 1 |
| Debrecen | Total | | 54 | 5 | 4 | 0 | 8 | 0 | 12 | 0 | 88 | 5 |
Puskás Akadémia
| Puskás Akadémia | 2015–16 | Nemzeti Bajnokság I | 12 | 0 | 0 | 0 | — | | — | | 12 | 0 |
| Puskás Akadémia | 2016–17 | Nemzeti Bajnokság II | 21 | 1 | 1 | 0 | — | | — | | 22 | 1 |
| Puskás Akadémia | 2017–18 | Nemzeti Bajnokság I | 11 | 0 | 7 | 0 | — | | — | | 18 | 0 |
| Puskás Akadémia | 2018–19 | Nemzeti Bajnokság I | 5 | 0 | 2 | 1 | — | | — | | 7 | 1 |
| Puskás Akadémia | Total | | 49 | 1 | 10 | 1 | 0 | 0 | 0 | 0 | 59 | 2 |
| Paks | 2018–19 | Nemzeti Bajnokság I | 8 | 0 | 1 | 0 | — | | — | | 9 | 0 |
Budaörs
| Budaörs | 2019–20 | Nemzeti Bajnokság II | 11 | 4 | 0 | 0 | — | | — | | 11 | 4 |
| Budaörs | 2020–21 | Nemzeti Bajnokság II | 25 | 4 | 1 | 1 | — | | — | | 26 | 5 |
| Budaörs | 2021–22 | Nemzeti Bajnokság II | 0 | 0 | 0 | 0 | — | | — | | 0 | 0 |
| Budaörs | Total | | 36 | 8 | 1 | 1 | 0 | 0 | 0 | 0 | 37 | 9 |
| Career total | | | 359 | 21 | 42 | 5 | 22 | 1 | 16 | 0 | 439 | 27 |

Updated to games played as of 19 May 2019.

== Honours ==
MTK Hungária FC

- Hungarian League: 2008
  - Runner-up: 2007
