= 2014–15 Dunaújváros PASE season =

Dunaújváros PASE
2013–14 season
- Chairman: (Hungary) György Vígh
- Manager: (Hungary) Barna Dobos
Home colours	Away colours

The 2014–15 season will be Dunaújváros PASE's 1st competitive season, 1st consecutive season in the Nemzeti Bajnokság I and 16th year in existence as a football club.

== First team squad ==
Note: Flags indicate national team as defined under FIFA eligibility rules; some limited exceptions apply. Players may hold more than one non-FIFA nationality.

No.	Pos.	Nation	Player
1	GK	HUN	Árpád Milinte
2	DF	HUN	Balázs Villám
3	FW	SRB	Milan Perić (loan from Videoton)
4	DF	CRO	Dino Gavrić
6	DF	HUN	Viktor Farkas
7	MF	HUN	Zsolt Lázár
8	MF	HUN	György Józsi
9	DF	HUN	Tamás Csehi
10	MF	HUN	Zoltán Böőr
11	MF	HUN	Tamás Szalai
12	MF	HUN	Norbert Sárközi
13	FW	HUN	Péter Urbin
14	MF	HUN	Gábor Kocsis
15	MF	HUN	Márk Petneházi

No.	Pos.	Nation	Player
16	MF	BRA	Thiago
17	FW	NGA	Egejuru Godslove
19	MF	ESP	Bruno Pascua
20	MF	HUN	Donát Zsótér (loan from Videoton)
21	FW	HUN	Tibor Sóron
23	MF	SVN	Timotej Dodlek
24	MF	MLT	Rowen Muscat
25	MF	HUN	Dávid Jakab
28	MF	HUN	Szilveszter Hangya (loan from MTK)
29	MF	HUN	Márk Orosz
30	MF	HUN	Márk Nikházi (loan from Diósgyőr)
32	DF	HUN	Adrián Szekeres (loan from Videoton)
33	GK	HUN	Gergely Nagy

== Transfers ==
=== Summer ===
In: Note: Flags indicate national team as defined under FIFA eligibility rules; some limited exceptions apply. Players may hold more than one non-FIFA nationality.

No.	Pos.	Nation	Player
3	FW	SRB	Milan Perić (loan from Videoton)
4	DF	CRO	Dino Gavrić (from (Cyprus) Paralimni)
8	MF	HUN	György Józsi (from Ferencváros)
13	FW	HUN	Péter Urbin (from Balmazújváros)
19	MF	ESP	Bruno Pascua (from (Spain) Gimnástica)
20	MF	HUN	Donát Zsótér (loan from Videoton)
23	MF	SVN	Timotej Dodlek (from (Slovenia) Maribor)
24	MF	MLT	Rowen Muscat (from (Malta) Birkirkara)
28	MF	HUN	Szilveszter Hangya (loan from MTK II)
29	MF	HUN	Márk Orosz (from Ferencváros)
30	MF	HUN	Márk Nikházi (loan from Diósgyőr)
32	DF	HUN	Adrián Szekeres (loan from Videoton)
33	GK	HUN	Gergely Nagy (from Győr)

Out: Note: Flags indicate national team as defined under FIFA eligibility rules; some limited exceptions apply. Players may hold more than one non-FIFA nationality.

No.	Pos.	Nation	Player
4	DF	SRB	Goran Beleuc
8	MF	GHA	Samuel Ato (to Nagykőrös)
12	MF	HUN	Máté Papp (loan return to Videoton II)
13	FW	HUN	Péter Urbin (to Szolnok)
13	MF	HUN	Ádám Galambos (loan to Szolnok)
14	MF	HUN	Gábor Kocsis (to Csákvár)
18	FW	HUN	Gábor Urbán (to (Austria) Hofstetten-Grünau)
19	DF	HUN	István Szauter
20	MF	SRB	David Perović (to Dorog)
22	GK	HUN	Balázs Bartus (to Dabas)

=== Winter ===
In: Note: Flags indicate national team as defined under FIFA eligibility rules; some limited exceptions apply. Players may hold more than one non-FIFA nationality.

No.	Pos.	Nation	Player
—	DF	HUN	Tamás Vaskó (from Puskás)
—	MF	HUN	Máté Papp (loan from Videoton)
—	FW	SRB	Goran Marić (from Pápa)
—	GK	SVN	Safet Jahič (from Kaposvár)
—	DF	JAM	Rafe Wolfe (from Győr)

Out: Note: Flags indicate national team as defined under FIFA eligibility rules; some limited exceptions apply. Players may hold more than one non-FIFA nationality.

No.	Pos.	Nation	Player
1	GK	HUN	Árpád Milinte (loan to Csákvár)
3	FW	SRB	Milan Perić (loan return to Videoton)
8	MF	HUN	György Józsi
11	MF	HUN	Tamás Szalai (to Csákvár)
20	MF	HUN	Donát Zsótér (loan return to Videoton)
23	MF	SVN	Timotej Dodlek
24	MF	MLT	Rowen Muscat (to (Malta) Birkirkara)
28	MF	HUN	Szilveszter Hangya (loan return to MTK II)

- List of Hungarian football transfers summer 2014
- List of Hungarian football transfers winter 2014–15

== Statistics ==
=== Appearances and goals ===
Last updated on 9 December 2014.

No.	Pos	Nat	Player	Total		OTP Bank Liga		Hungarian Cup		League Cup	
No.	Pos	Nat	Player	Apps	Goals	Apps	Goals	Apps	Goals	Apps	Goals
1	GK	(Hungary) HUN	Árpád Milinte	10	-20	9	-18	0	0	1	-2
2	DF	(Hungary) HUN	Balázs Villám	18	0	13	0	0	0	5	0
3	FW	(Serbia) SRB	Milan Perić	13	3	7	2	1	0	5	1
4	DF	(Croatia) CRO	Dino Gavrić	11	0	9	0	0	0	2	0
6	DF	(Hungary) HUN	Viktor Farkas	16	0	9	0	0	0	7	0
7	MF	(Hungary) HUN	Zsolt Lázár	18	0	11	0	0	0	7	0
8	MF	(Hungary) HUN	György Józsi	12	0	9	0	0	0	3	0
9	DF	(Hungary) HUN	Tamás Csehi	21	0	17	0	1	0	3	0
10	MF	(Hungary) HUN	Zoltán Böőr	21	7	17	6	1	0	3	1
11	MF	(Hungary) HUN	Tamás Szalai	10	1	3	0	1	0	6	1
12	MF	(Hungary) HUN	Norbert Sárközi	13	0	7	0	0	0	6	0
13	FW	(Hungary) HUN	Péter Urbin	3	0	3	0	0	0	0	0
14	MF	(Hungary) HUN	Gábor Kocsis	3	0	2	0	1	0	0	0
15	MF	(Hungary) HUN	Márk Petneházi	20	3	13	1	1	0	6	2
16	MF	(Brazil) BRA	Thiago	17	1	11	0	0	0	6	1
17	FW	(Nigeria) NGA	Egejuru Godslove	15	4	7	1	1	0	7	3
19	MF	(Spain) ESP	Bruno Pascua	14	1	6	0	1	0	7	1
20	MF	(Hungary) HUN	Donát Zsótér	19	0	14	0	1	0	4	0
21	FW	(Hungary) HUN	Tibor Sóron	13	0	5	0	0	0	8	0
23	MF	(Slovenia) SVN	Timotej Dodlek	9	3	6	0	0	0	3	3
24	MF	(Malta) MLT	Rowen Muscat	10	1	7	0	1	0	2	1
25	MF	(Hungary) HUN	Dávid Jakab	15	2	7	0	1	0	7	2
28	MF	(Hungary) HUN	Szilveszter Hangya	8	0	1	0	0	0	7	0
29	MF	(Hungary) HUN	Márk Orosz	21	4	14	2	0	0	7	2
30	MF	(Hungary) HUN	Márk Nikházi	14	5	11	3	0	0	3	2
32	DF	(Hungary) HUN	Adrián Szekeres	10	0	9	0	1	0	0	0
33	GK	(Hungary) HUN	Gergely Nagy	13	-21	8	-14	1	-1	4	-6
Youth players:
18	DF	(Hungary) HUN	István Szauter	2	0	0	0	0	0	2	0
22	GK	(Hungary) HUN	Dániel Csaba	4	-4	0	0	0	0	4	-4
26	MF	(Hungary) HUN	Péter Hosszú	1	0	0	0	0	0	1	0
Players no longer at the club:

=== Top scorers ===
Includes all competitive matches. The list is sorted by shirt number when total goals are equal.

Last updated on 9 December 2014

Position	Nation	Number	Name	OTP Bank Liga	Hungarian Cup	League Cup	Total
1	(Hungary)	10	Zoltán Böőr	6	0	1	7
2	(Hungary)	30	Márk Nikházi	3	0	2	5
3	(Hungary)	29	Márk Orosz	2	0	2	4
4	(Nigeria)	17	Egejuru Godslove	1	0	3	4
5	(Serbia)	3	Milan Perić	2	0	1	3
6	(Hungary)	15	Márk Petneházi	1	0	2	3
7	(Slovenia)	23	Timotej Dodlek	0	0	3	3
8	(Hungary)	25	Dávid Jakab	0	0	2	2
9	(Spain)	19	Bruno Pascua	0	0	1	1
10	(Hungary)	11	Tamá Szalai	0	0	1	1
11	(Brazil)	16	Thiago	0	0	1	1
12	(Malta)	24	Rowen Muscat	0	0	1	1
/	/	/	Own Goals	0	0	1	1
			TOTALS	15	0	21	36

=== Disciplinary record ===
Includes all competitive matches. Players with 1 card or more included only.

Last updated on 9 December 2014

Position	Nation	Number	Name	OTP Bank Liga		Hungarian Cup		League Cup		Total (Hu Total)	
Position	Nation	Number	Name	Booked	Sent off (straight red)	Booked	Sent off (straight red)	Booked	Sent off (straight red)	Booked	Sent off (straight red)
GK	(Hungary)	1	Árpád Milinte	1	0	0	0	1	0	2 (1)	0 (0)
DF	(Hungary)	2	Balázs Villám	0	1	0	0	1	0	1 (0)	1 (1)
DF	(Croatia)	4	Dino Gavrić	1	0	0	0	0	0	1 (1)	0 (0)
DF	(Hungary)	6	Viktor Farkas	1	0	0	0	0	0	1 (1)	0 (0)
MF	(Hungary)	7	Zsolt Lázár	3	0	0	0	0	0	3 (3)	0 (0)
DF	(Hungary)	9	Tamás Csehi	3	0	0	0	0	0	3 (3)	0 (0)
MF	(Hungary)	10	Zoltán Böőr	1	0	0	0	0	0	1 (1)	0 (0)
MF	(Hungary)	11	Tamás Szalai	0	0	1	0	0	0	1 (0)	0 (0)
MF	(Hungary)	12	Norbert Sárközi	2	0	0	0	0	0	2 (2)	0 (0)
FW	(Hungary)	13	Péter Urbin	1	0	0	0	0	0	1 (1)	0 (0)
MF	(Hungary)	14	Gábor Kocsis	1	0	0	0	0	0	1 (1)	0 (0)
MF	(Hungary)	15	Márk Petneházi	3	0	0	0	1	0	4 (3)	0 (0)
FW	(Nigeria)	17	Egejuru Godslove	2	0	0	0	0	0	2 (2)	0 (0)
MF	(Spain)	19	Bruno Pascua	0	0	1	0	0	0	1 (0)	0 (0)
MF	(Hungary)	20	Donát Zsótér	1	0	0	0	0	0	1 (1)	0 (0)
GK	(Hungary)	22	Csaba Dániel	0	0	0	0	1	0	1 (0)	0 (0)
MF	(Malta)	24	Rowen Muscat	1	1	0	0	0	0	1 (1)	1 (1)
MF	(Hungary)	25	Dávid Jakab	2	1	0	0	2	0	4 (2)	1 (1)
MF	(Hungary)	28	Szilveszter Hangya	0	0	0	0	1	0	1 (0)	0 (0)
MF	(Hungary)	30	Márk Nikházi	3	0	0	0	1	0	4 (3)	0 (0)
DF	(Hungary)	32	Adrián Szekeres	1	0	0	0	0	0	1 (1)	0 (0)
			TOTALS	27	3	2	0	8	0	37 (27)	3 (3)

=== Overall ===
Games played	26 (17 OTP Bank Liga, 1 Hungarian Cup and 8 Hungarian League Cup)
Games won	8 (3 OTP Bank Liga, 0 Hungarian Cup and 5 Hungarian League Cup)
Games drawn	6 (5 OTP Bank Liga, 0 Hungarian Cup and 1 Hungarian League Cup)
Games lost	12 (9 OTP Bank Liga, 1 Hungarian Cup and 2 Hungarian League Cup)
Goals scored	36
Goals conceded	45
Goal difference	-9
Yellow cards	37
Red cards	3
Worst discipline	(Hungary) Dávid Jakab (4 (yellow card) , 1 (red card) )
Best result	6–1 (H) v Mezőkövesd – Ligakupa – 14-10-2014
Worst result	0–3 (A) v Budapest Honvéd – OTP Bank Liga – 26-07-2014
Worst result	0–3 (A) v Videoton – OTP Bank Liga – 02-08-2014
Worst result	0–3 (A) v Újpest – OTP Bank Liga – 04-10-2014
Worst result	1–4 (H) v Videoton – OTP Bank Liga – 06-12-2014
Most appearances	(Hungary) Tamás Csehi (21 appearances)
Most appearances	(Hungary) Zoltán Böőr (21 appearances)
Most appearances	(Hungary) Márk Orosz (21 appearances)
Top scorer	(Hungary) Zoltán Böőr (7 goals)
Points	30/78 (38.46%)

Last updated: 9 December 2014

== OTP Bank Liga ==
=== Matches ===
26 July 2014 1	Honvéd	3–0	Dunaújváros	Budapest, Pest County
16:30 CEST	Holender 75'; Youla 87'; Traoré 90+3'	Report		Stadium: Bozsik Stadion; Attendance: 1,100; Referee: (Hungary) Ádám Farkas

2 August 2014 2	Videoton	3–0	Dunaújváros	Székesfehérvár, Fejér County
16:30 CEST	Oliveira 19'; Sándor 56'; Nikolić 62'	Report		Stadium: Sóstói Stadion; Attendance: 2,310; Referee: (Hungary) Tamás Bognár

27 August 2014 3	Ferencváros	2–0	Dunaújváros	Budapest, Pest County
18:30 CEST	Ugrai 30'; Böde 44'	Report		Stadium: Groupama Arena; Attendance: 7,789; Referee: (Hungary) József Erdős

16 August 2014 4	Dunaújváros	1–1	Pápa	Székesfehérvár, Fejér County
18:30 CEST	Orosz 33'	Report	Nagy 37'	Stadium: Sóstói Stadion; Attendance: 443; Referee: (Hungary) Mihály Fábián

23 August 2014 5	Kecskemét	0–0	Dunaújváros	Kecskemét, Bács-Kiskun County
18:30 CEST		Report		Stadium: Széktói Stadion; Attendance: 1,411; Referee: (Hungary) Csaba Pintér

31 August 2014 6	Győr	4–3	Dunaújváros	Győr, Győr-Moson-Sopron County
18:30 CEST	Rudolf 25' (pen.); Pátkai 53', 59', 69'	Report	Perić 17'; Böőr 63' (pen.), 83' (pen.)	Stadium: ETO Park; Attendance: 2,525; Referee: (Hungary) Ádám Farkas

13 September 2014 7	Nyíregyháza	0–0	Dunaújváros	Nyíregyháza, Szabolcs-Szatmár-Bereg County
18:30 CEST		Report		Stadium: Városi Stadion; Attendance: 2,108; Referee: (Hungary) Tamás Bognár

20 September 2014 8	MTK	2–0	Dunaújváros	Budapest, Pest County
18:30 CEST	Pölöskei 36'; Kanta 64' (pen.)	Report		Stadium: Hidegkuti Nándor Stadium; Attendance: 500; Referee: (Hungary) Viktor Kassai

27 September 2014 9	Puskás	3–2	Dunaújváros	Felcsút, Fejér County
18:30 CEST	Lorentz 61'; Szakály 69'; Tischler 78'	Report	Orosz 40'; Perić 45'	Stadium: Pancho Arena; Attendance: 800; Referee: (Hungary) István Vad

4 October 2014 10	Újpest	3–0	Dunaújváros	Budapest, Pest County
20:00 CEST	Vasiljević 37' (pen.); Simon 87'; Stanisavljević 90+3'	Report		Stadium: Szusza Ferenc Stadium; Attendance: 2,050; Referee: (Hungary) Csaba Pintér

17 October 2014 11	Dunaújváros	1–0	Haladás	Dunaújváros, Fejér County
19:00 CEST	Nikházi 28'	Report		Stadium: Dunaferr Arena; Attendance: 2,241; Referee: (Hungary) Peter Solymosi

25 October 2014 12	Diósgyőr	3–3	Dunaújváros	Diósgyőr, Borsod-Abaúj-Zemplén County
18:00 CEST	Bacsa 47'; Grumić 63'; Marjanović 89'	Report	Böőr 16' (pen.), 25'; Nikházi 25'	Stadium: DVTK Stadion; Attendance: 3,170; Referee: (Hungary) Sándor Andó-Szabó

1 November 2014 13	Dunaújváros	3–2	Pécs	Dunaújváros, Fejér County
16:00 CET	Petneházi 55'; Böőr 79'; Godslove 82'	Report	Balogh 29'; Márkvárt 63'	Stadium: Dunaferr Arena; Attendance: 1,411; Referee: (Hungary) Peter Solymosi

8 November 2014 14	Debrecen	2–0	Dunaújváros	Debrecen, Hajdú-Bihar County
20:00 CET	Máté 60'; Brković 79'	Report		Stadium: Nagyerdei Stadion; Attendance: 2,657; Referee: (Hungary) Csaba Pintér

22 November 2014 15	Dunaújváros	1–0	Paks	Dunaújváros, Fejér County
16:00 CET	Nikházi 61'	Report		Stadium: Dunaferr Arena; Attendance: 1,511; Referee: (Hungary) Sándor Andó-Szabó

28 November 2014 16	Dunaújváros	0–0	Honvéd	Dunaújváros, Fejér County
19:00 CET		Report		Stadium: Dunaferr Arena; Attendance: 1,420; Referee: (Hungary) Zoltán Iványi

6 December 2014 17	Dunaújváros	1–4	Videoton	Dunaújváros, Fejér County
16:00 CET	Böőr 65' (pen.)	Report	Nikolić 10'; Gyurcsó 29'; Alvarez 53'; Vinícius 86'	Stadium: Dunaferr Arena; Attendance: 1,268; Referee: (Hungary) István Vad

=== Classification ===
Pos	Team	Pld	W	D	L	GF	GA	GD	Pts	Qualification or relegation
12	Nyíregyháza (R)	30	8	6	16	33	49	−16	30	Relegation to Nemzeti Bajnokság III (Note: Kecskemét, Nyíregyháza and Pécs won't be members of 2015–16 Nemzeti Bajnokság I due to licence problems)
13	Honvéd	30	6	10	14	26	36	−10	28	
14	Haladás	30	7	4	19	26	53	−27	25	
15	Dunaújváros (Note: Dunaújváros deducted 1 point) (R)	30	5	8	17	26	49	−23	22	Relegation to Nemzeti Bajnokság II
16	Pápa (R)	30	4	7	19	14	57	−43	19	Dissolved - Pápai PFC in the Veszprém County Football League One as successor

Source: mlsz.hu (in Hungarian)
Rules for classification: 1st points; 2nd overall wins; 3rd goal difference; 4th head-to-head points; 5th head-to-head goal difference; 6th head-to-head away goals scored; 7th fair-play points; 8th drawing of lots
(R) Relegated

=== Results summary ===
Overall								Home						Away					
Pld	W	D	L	GF	GA	GD	Pts	W	D	L	GF	GA	GD	W	D	L	GF	GA	GD
17	3	5	9	15	32	−17	14	3	2	1	7	7	0	0	3	8	8	25	−17

Last updated: 7 December 2014.
Source: NB1

=== Results by round ===
Round	1	2	3	4	5	6	7	8	9	10	11	12	13	14	15	16	17	18	19	20	21	22	23	24	25	26	27	28	29	30
Ground	A	A	A	H	A	A	A	A	A	A	H	A	H	A	H	H	H													
Result	L	L	L	D	D	L	D	L	L	L	W	D	W	L	W	D	L													
Position	16	16	16	16	16	16	16	16	16	16	16	16	15	15	14	14	14													

Updated to match(es) played on 7 December 2014. Source: Matches
A = Away; H = Home; W = Win; D = Draw; L = Loss

== Hungarian Cup ==
9 August 2014 Round 1	Orosháza	1–0	Dunaújváros	Orosháza, Békés County
17:00 CEST	Ferenczi 82'	Report		Stadium: Mátrai- Stadion; Referee: (Hungary) József Berger

== League Cup ==
=== Group stage ===
3 September 2014 1	MTK	2–3	Dunaújváros	Budapest, Pest County
14:00 CEST	Csiki 31'; Horváth 50'	Report	Jakab 8'; Pascua 14'; Godslove 87'	Stadium: Hidegkuti Nándor Stadium; Attendance: 200; Referee: (Hungary) János Takács

16 September 2014 2	Dunaújváros	1–1	Balmazújváros	Dunaújváros, Fejér County
15:00 CEST	Szalai 15'	Report	Kiss 65'	Stadium: Dunaferr Arena; Attendance: 200; Referee: (Hungary) Tamás Takács

7 October 2014 3	Mezőkövesd	0–4	Dunaújváros	Mezőkövesd, Borsod-Abaúj-Zemplén County
17:00 CEST		Report	Orosz 11', 13'; Böőr 45' (pen.); Petneházi 74'	Stadium: Városi Stadion; Attendance: 400; Referee: (Hungary) Roland Veizer

14 September 2014 4	Dunaújváros	6–1	Mezőkövesd	Dunaújváros, Fejér County
14:00 CEST	Godslove 15', 39'; Petneházi 21'; Thiago 27'; Jakab 83'; Perić 89'	Report	Máté 50'	Stadium: Dunaferr Arena; Attendance: 100; Referee: (Hungary) Péter Zierkelbach

11 November 2014 5	Balmazújváros	2–3	Dunaújváros	Balmazújváros, Hajdú-Bihar County
13:30 CET	Angyal 45'; Kondás 53'	Report	Nikházi 37', 75'; Virágh 88' (o.g.)	Stadium: Batthyány utcai Sportpálya; Attendance: 200; Referee: (Hungary) Ferenc Karakó

18 November 2014 6	Dunaújváros	1–2	MTK	Dunaújváros, Fejér County
18:00 CET	Dodlek 32'	Report	Hrepka 21'; Vass 60'	Stadium: Dunaferr Arena; Attendance: 400; Referee: (Hungary) Gábor Oláh

Pos	Team	Pld	W	D	L	GF	GA	GD	Pts	Qualification	MTK	DUN	MEZ	BAL
1	MTK Budapest	6	5	0	1	16	8	+8	15	Advance to knockout phase	—	2–3	2–1	2–1
2	Dunaújváros	6	4	1	1	18	8	+10	13	Advance to knockout phase	1–2	—	6–1	1–1
3	Mezőkövesd	6	2	0	4	13	20	−7	6		2–5	0–4	—	4–2
4	Balmazújváros	6	0	1	5	7	18	−11	1		0–3	2–3	1–5	—

Source: Soccerway

=== Knockout phase ===
2 December 2014 Round of 16	Dunaújváros	2–1	Videoton	Dunaújváros, Fejér County
13:00 CET	Dodlek 23'; Muscat 44'	Report	Feczesin 85' (pen.)	Stadium: Dunaferr Arena; Attendance: 300; Referee: (Hungary) Ádám Németh

9 December 2014 Round of 16	Videoton	3–1 (4–3 agg.)	Dunaújváros	Székesfehérvár, Fejér County
17:00 CET	Feczesin 43' (pen.), 72'; Oliveira 68'	Report	Dodlek 40'	Stadium: Sóstói Stadion; Attendance: 620; Referee: (Hungary) Tamás Bognár
