= 2014–15 MTK Budapest FC season =

MTK Budapest FC
2014–15 season
- Chairman: (Hungary) Tamás Deutsch
- Manager: (Hungary) József Garami
Home colours	Away colours

The 2014–15 season will be MTK Budapest FC's 105th competitive season, 3rd consecutive season in the OTP Bank Liga and 126th year in existence as a football club.

== First team squad ==
Note: Flags indicate national team as defined under FIFA eligibility rules; some limited exceptions apply. Players may hold more than one non-FIFA nationality.

No.	Pos.	Nation	Player
1	GK	HUN	Lajos Hegedűs
2	DF	HUN	Tibor Nagy
5	DF	HUN	Dávid Kelemen
6	MF	HUN	Ádám Hajdú
7	FW	HUN	Zsolt Horváth
8	MF	HUN	Norbert Csiki
9	FW	ESP	Sergio Tamayo
12	DF	HUN	Dávid Kálnoki-Kis
13	FW	HUN	Ádám Hrepka
14	FW	HUN	Sándor Torghelle
15	MF	SEN	Khaly Thiam

No.	Pos.	Nation	Player
16	MF	HUN	Zsolt Pölöskei
17	MF	HUN	Patrik Vass
18	FW	HUN	Barnabás Bese
19	MF	HUN	József Kanta
21	DF	SRB	Dragan Vukmir
22	MF	HUN	Benjámin Cseke
24	DF	HUN	Patrik Poór
25	DF	HUN	Sándor Hidvégi
32	FW	HUN	Richárd Frank
38	MF	HUN	Ádám Vass

== Transfers ==
=== Summer ===
In: Note: Flags indicate national team as defined under FIFA eligibility rules; some limited exceptions apply. Players may hold more than one non-FIFA nationality.

No.	Pos.	Nation	Player
3	DF	HUN	Bence Deutsch (loan return from Szigetszentmiklós)
9	FW	ESP	Sergio Tamayo (from (Spain) Logroñés)
13	FW	HUN	Ádám Hrepka (from Haladás)
15	MF	SEN	Khaly Thiam (from Kaposvár)
20	FW	HUN	Balázs Batizi-Pócsi (loan return from Tatabánya)
22	MF	HUN	Benjámin Cseke (from Vasas)
25	DF	HUN	Sándor Hidvégi (loan from Ferencváros)
27	MF	HUN	Ramon Halmai (from Haladás II)
39	FW	HUN	Péter Horváth (loan return from Siófok)
—	FW	BRA	Bouard Ramos (loan return from Kisvárda)
—	MF	HUN	Ferenc Rácz (loan return from Pécs)

Out: Note: Flags indicate national team as defined under FIFA eligibility rules; some limited exceptions apply. Players may hold more than one non-FIFA nationality.

No.	Pos.	Nation	Player
14	DF	HUN	András Fejes (loan return to Videoton II)
20	FW	HUN	Balázs Batizi-Pócsi (loan to Balmazújváros)
20	DF	HUN	István Rodenbücher (loan to Vasas)
25	MF	ESP	Ayub (to (Spain) Real Valladolid B)
27	MF	HUN	Bence Batik (loan return to Ferencváros)
32	FW	HUN	Richárd Frank (to Pécs)
39	FW	HUN	Péter Horváth (loan to Sopron)
45	FW	HUN	Márton Eppel (loan return to Paks)
—	FW	BRA	Bouard Ramos (loan to Kisvárda)
—	MF	HUN	Ferenc Rácz (loan to Pécs)

- List of Hungarian football transfers summer 2014

=== Winter ===
In: Note: Flags indicate national team as defined under FIFA eligibility rules; some limited exceptions apply. Players may hold more than one non-FIFA nationality.

No.	Pos.	Nation	Player
—	DF	HUN	Dániel Vadnai (from Debrecen)
—	LW	HUN	Dániel Gera (from youth sector)
—	DF	HUN	Attila Talabér (from youth sector)
—	DF	HUN	István Rodenbücher (loan return from Vasas)
—	FW	BRA	Myke Ramos (loan return from Kisvárda)

Out: Note: Flags indicate national team as defined under FIFA eligibility rules; some limited exceptions apply. Players may hold more than one non-FIFA nationality.

No.	Pos.	Nation	Player
—	DF	HUN	István Rodenbücher (to Paks)
—	LW	HUN	Patrik Vass (loan to Vasas)
—	MF	HUN	Tibor Ladányi (loan to Szigetszentmiklós)
—	FW	BRA	Myke Ramos (loan to Kisvárda)
—	DF	HUN	Sándor Hidvégi (loan return to Ferencváros)

- List of Hungarian football transfers winter 2014–15

== Statistics ==
=== Appearances and goals ===
Last updated on 31 May 2015.

No.	Pos	Nat	Player	Total		OTP Bank Liga		Hungarian Cup		League Cup	
No.	Pos	Nat	Player	Apps	Goals	Apps	Goals	Apps	Goals	Apps	Goals
1	GK	(Hungary) HUN	Lajos Hegedűs	32	-28	29	-24	1	-2	2	-2
2	DF	(Hungary) HUN	Tibor Nagy	28	0	18	0	2	0	8	0
4	DF	(Hungary) HUN	Ákos Baki	15	0	10	0	0	0	5	0
5	DF	(Hungary) HUN	Dávid Kelemen	17	0	10	0	3	0	4	0
6	MF	(Hungary) HUN	Ádám Hajdú	25	5	10	0	4	0	11	5
7	FW	(Hungary) HUN	Zsolt Horváth	39	10	28	4	4	4	7	2
8	MF	(Hungary) HUN	Norbert Csiki	24	10	17	6	1	1	6	3
9	FW	(Spain) ESP	Sergio Tamayo	15	3	6	0	2	1	7	2
11	DF	(Hungary) HUN	Dániel Vadnai	12	0	9	0	0	0	3	0
12	DF	(Hungary) HUN	Dávid Kálnoki-Kis	15	0	9	0	1	0	5	0
13	FW	(Hungary) HUN	Ádám Hrepka	25	9	15	2	3	2	7	5
14	FW	(Hungary) HUN	Sándor Torghelle	30	7	22	6	2	0	6	1
15	MF	(Senegal) SEN	Khaly Thiam	28	3	16	1	1	1	11	1
16	MF	(Hungary) HUN	Zsolt Pölöskei	35	8	28	5	3	3	4	0
18	FW	(Hungary) HUN	Barnabás Bese	38	3	27	2	2	1	9	0
19	MF	(Hungary) HUN	József Kanta	38	12	29	8	4	3	5	1
21	DF	(Serbia) SRB	Dragan Vukmir	36	0	27	0	4	0	5	0
22	MF	(Hungary) HUN	Benjámin Cseke	14	2	4	0	2	2	8	0
24	DF	(Hungary) HUN	Patrik Poór	29	1	21	1	3	0	5	0
26	MF	(Hungary) HUN	István Szatmári	2	0	1	0	0	0	1	0
27	MF	(Hungary) HUN	Ramon Halmai	9	0	1	0	1	0	7	0
28	GK	(Italy) ITA	Federico Groppioni	13	-11	1	-1	3	-2	9	-8
32	FW	(Hungary) HUN	Richárd Frank	7	1	6	1	1	0	0	0
33	LW	(Hungary) HUN	Dániel Gera	4	0	2	0	0	0	2	0
38	MF	(Hungary) HUN	Ádám Vass	35	0	27	0	0	0	8	0
39	FW	(Hungary) HUN	Ádám Schrammel	8	0	1	0	0	0	7	0
43	MF	(Hungary) HUN	Bálint Vogyicska	5	1	2	0	0	0	3	1
Youth players:
34	DF	(Hungary) HUN	Attila Talabér	4	0	0	0	0	0	4	0
41	MF	(Hungary) HUN	Milán Sági	2	0	0	0	0	0	2	0
47	DF	(Hungary) HUN	Imre Széles	2	0	0	0	0	0	2	0
49	FW	(Hungary) HUN	Sinan Sinanovic	2	0	0	0	0	0	2	0
	DF	(Hungary) HUN	Bence Deutsch	9	0	0	0	2	0	7	0
	DF	(Hungary) HUN	Máté Katona	1	0	0	0	0	0	1	0
	MF	(Greece) GRE	Konstantinos Ikonomou	1	0	0	0	0	0	1	0
	FW	(Hungary) HUN	Gergő Szántó	1	0	0	0	0	0	1	0
	GK	(Hungary) HUN	Attila Abu	4	-4	0	0	0	0	4	-4
	FW	(Hungary) HUN	Tamás Fadgyas	0	0	0	0	0	0	0	0
	MF	(Hungary) HUN	Tamás Hujber	3	0	0	0	1	0	2	0
Out to loan:
17	MF	(Hungary) HUN	Patrik Vass	18	5	11	1	1	1	6	3
Players no longer at the club:
25	DF	(Hungary) HUN	Sándor Hidvégi	17	1	13	1	4	0	0	0

=== Top scorers ===
Includes all competitive matches. The list is sorted by shirt number when total goals are equal.

Last updated on 31 May 2015

Position	Nation	Number	Name	OTP Bank Liga	Hungarian Cup	League Cup	Total
1	(Hungary)	19	József Kanta	8	3	1	12
2	(Hungary)	8	Norbert Csiki	6	1	3	10
3	(Hungary)	7	Zsolt Horváth	4	4	2	10
4	(Hungary)	13	Ádám Hrepka	2	2	5	9
5	(Hungary)	16	Zsolt Pölöskei	5	3	0	8
6	(Hungary)	14	Sándor Torghelle	6	0	1	7
7	(Hungary)	17	Patrik Vass	1	1	3	5
8	(Hungary)	6	Ádám Hajdú	0	0	5	5
9	(Hungary)	18	Barnabás Bese	2	1	0	3
10	(Senegal)	15	Khaly Thiam	1	1	1	3
11	(Spain)	9	Sergio Tamayo	0	1	2	3
12	(Hungary)	29	Benjámin Cseke	0	2	0	2
13	(Hungary)	32	Richárd Frank	1	0	0	1
14	(Hungary)	24	Patrik Poór	1	0	0	1
15	(Hungary)	25	Sándor Hidvégi	1	0	0	1
16	(Hungary)	19	Bálint Vogyicska	0	0	1	1
/	/	/	Own Goals	1	0	0	1
			TOTALS	39	19	24	81

=== Disciplinary record ===
Includes all competitive matches. Players with 1 card or more included only.

Last updated on 31 May 2015

Position	Nation	Number	Name	OTP Bank Liga		Hungarian Cup		League Cup		Total (Hu Total)	
Position	Nation	Number	Name	Yellow card	Red card	Yellow card	Red card	Yellow card	Red card	Yellow card	Red card
DF	(Hungary)	2	Tibor Nagy	5	0	0	0	0	0	5 (5)	0 (0)
DF	(Hungary)	4	Ákos Baki	5	0	0	0	0	0	5 (5)	0 (0)
DF	(Hungary)	5	Dávid Kelemen	0	0	1	0	0	0	1 (0)	0 (0)
MF	(Hungary)	6	Ádám Hajdú	1	0	0	0	2	0	3 (1)	0 (0)
FW	(Hungary)	7	Zsolt Horváth	1	0	0	0	0	0	1 (1)	0 (0)
FW	(Spain)	9	Sergio Tamayo	1	0	0	0	0	0	1 (1)	0 (0)
DF	(Hungary)	11	Dániel Vadnai	3	0	0	0	0	0	3 (3)	0 (0)
DF	(Hungary)	12	Dávid Kálnoki-Kis	0	1	0	0	1	0	1 (0)	1 (1)
FW	(Hungary)	13	Ádám Hrepka	2	0	1	0	0	0	3 (2)	0 (0)
FW	(Hungary)	14	Sándor Torghelle	5	0	0	0	0	0	5 (5)	0 (0)
MF	(Senegal)	15	Khaly Thiam	3	1	0	0	0	0	3 (3)	1 (1)
MF	(Hungary)	16	Zsolt Pölöskei	3	0	1	0	0	0	4 (3)	0 (0)
MF	(Greece)	16	Konstantinos Ikonomou	0	0	0	0	0	1	0 (0)	1 (0)
MF	(Hungary)	19	József Kanta	2	0	1	0	0	0	3 (2)	0 (0)
DF	(Serbia)	21	Dragan Vukmir	10	1	1	0	0	0	11 (10)	1 (1)
MF	(Hungary)	22	Benjámin Cseke	0	0	0	0	1	0	1 (0)	0 (0)
DF	(Hungary)	24	Patrik Poór	1	0	1	0	0	0	2 (1)	0 (0)
MF	(Hungary)	27	Ramon Halmai	0	0	0	0	1	0	1 (0)	0 (0)
GK	(Italy)	28	Federico Groppioni	0	0	0	0	1	0	1 (0)	0 (0)
FW	(Hungary)	32	Richárd Frank	1	0	0	0	0	0	1 (1)	0 (0)
MF	(Hungary)	38	Ádám Vass	4	0	0	0	1	0	5 (4)	0 (0)
			TOTALS	47	3	6	0	7	1	60 (47)	4 (3)

=== Overall ===
Games played	46 (30 OTP Bank Liga, 4 Hungarian Cup and 12 Hungarian League Cup)
Games won	30 (18 OTP Bank Liga, 3 Hungarian Cup and 9 Hungarian League Cup)
Games drawn	3 (3 OTP Bank Liga, 0 Hungarian Cup and 0 Hungarian League Cup)
Games lost	13 (9 OTP Bank Liga, 1 Hungarian Cup and 3 Hungarian League Cup)
Goals scored	82
Goals conceded	43
Goal difference	+39
Yellow cards	60
Red cards	4
Worst discipline	(Serbia) Dragan Vukmir (11 (yellow card) , 1 (red card) )
Best result	9–0 (A) v Jászapáti - Magyar Kupa - 09–09–2014
Worst result	0–5 (A) v Videoton - OTP Bank Liga - 23–08–2014
Most appearances	(Hungary) Zsolt Horváth (39 appearances)
Top scorer	(Hungary) József Kanta (12 goals)
Points	93/138 (67.39%)

Last updated: 31 May 2015

== Nemzeti Bajnokság I ==
=== Matches ===
26 July 2014 1	Pécs	0 – 4	MTK	Pécs, Baranya County
18:30 CEST		Report	Horváth 59'; Kanta 76', 90+2'; Frank 89'	Stadium: Stadion PMFC; Attendance: 1,320; Referee: (Hungary) Ádám Németh

1 August 2014 2	MTK	1 – 0	Debrecen	Budapest, Pest County
20:30 CEST	Horváth 90'	Report		Stadium: Bozsik József Stadion; Attendance: 737; Referee: (Hungary) Zoltán Iványi

8 August 2014 3	Paks	3 – 0	MTK	Paks, Tolna County
19:00 CEST	Bartha 3'; Eppel 58'; Könyves 84'	Report		Stadium: Stadion PSE; Attendance: 1,543; Referee: (Hungary) Péter Solymosi

16 August 2014 4	MTK	2 – 0	Honvéd	Felcsút, Fejér County
18:30 CEST	Kanta 34' 53' (pen.)	Report		Stadium: Pancho Arena; Attendance: 743; Referee: (Hungary) Viktor Kassai

23 August 2014 5	Videoton	5 – 0	MTK	Székesfehérvár, Fejér County
18:30 CEST	Kovács 2', 27'; Gyurcsó 12'; Nikolić 55'; Feczesin 90+1'	Report		Stadium: Sóstói Stadion; Attendance: 2,880; Referee: (Hungary) Ádám Farkas

31 August 2014 6	MTK	2 – 1	Ferencváros	Budapest, Pest County
16:30 CEST	Poór 25'; Horváth 80'	Report	Lauth 30'	Stadium: Bozsik József Stadion; Attendance: 948; Referee: (Hungary) Tamás Bognár

12 September 2014 7	Pápa	0 – 1	MTK	Pápa, Veszprém County
19:00 CEST		Report	Vass 45'	Stadium: Stadion Várkerti; Attendance: 754; Referee: (Hungary) István Vad

20 September 2014 8	MTK	2 – 0	Dunaújváros	Budapest, Pest County
18:30 CEST	Pölöskei 36'; Kanta 64' (pen.)	Report		Stadium: Bozsik József Stadion; Attendance: 500; Referee: (Hungary) Viktor Kassai

27 September 2014 9	Győr	1 – 2	MTK	Győr, Győr-Moson-Sopron County
16:30 CEST	Střeštík 56'	Report	Střeštík 81' (o.g.); Hrepka 86'	Stadium: ETO Park; Attendance: 2,562; Referee: (Hungary) Zoltán Iványi

5 October 2014 10	MTK	2 – 0	Nyíregyháza	Budapest, Pest County
16:30 CEST	Torghelle 27'; Hidvégi 76'	Report		Stadium: Bozsik József Stadion; Attendance: 500; Referee: (Hungary) Ádám Farkas

18 October 2014 11	Kecskemét	0 – 1	MTK	Kecskemét, Bács-Kiskun County
18:00 CEST		Report	Kanta 47' (pen.)	Stadium: Széktói Stadion; Attendance: 1,472; Referee: (Hungary) Tamás Bognár

25 October 2014 12	Puskás	0 – 1	MTK	Felcsút, Fejér County
14:00 CEST		Report	Pölöskei 26'	Stadium: Pancho Arena; Attendance: 1,457; Referee: (Hungary) Csaba Pintér

2 November 2014 13	MTK	0 – 1	Újpest	Budapest, Pest County
16:30 CET		Report	Balogh 85'	Stadium: Bozsik József Stadion; Attendance: 1,120; Referee: (Hungary) Zoltán Iványi

9 November 2014 14	Haladás	0 – 3	MTK	Szombathely, Vas County
16:30 CET		Report	Hrepka 4'; Torghelle 85'; Bese 88'	Stadium: Rohonci Street Stadium; Attendance: 1,300; Referee: (Hungary) Sándor Andó-Szabó

22 November 2014 15	MTK	0 – 2	Diósgyőr	Budapest, Pest County
14:00 CET		Report	Griffiths 9', 32'	Stadium: Bozsik József Stadion; Attendance: 825; Referee: (Hungary) Zsolt Szabó

29 November 2014 16	MTK	3 – 2	Pécs	Budapest, Pest County
16:00 CET	Torghelle 4'; Csiki 65', 87'	Report	Frank 24'; Nagy 45'	Stadium: Bozsik József Stadion; Attendance: 400; Referee: (Hungary) Csaba Pintér

7 December 2014 17	Debrecen	2 – 1	MTK	Debrecen, Hajdú-Bihar County
18:30 CET	Varga 11'; Tisza 82' (pen.)	Report	Pölöskei 61'	Stadium: Nagyerdei Stadion; Attendance: 2,423; Referee: (Hungary) Ádám Németh

27 February 2015 18	MTK Budapest	3 – 1	Paks	Budapest
19:00 CET	Bese 37'; Pölöskei 59'; Horváth 88'	Report	Báló 45'	Stadium: Bozsik József Stadion; Attendance: 314; Referee: Sándor Andó-Szabó

8 March 2015 19	Budapest Honvéd	0 – 2	MTK Budapest	Budapest
16:30 CET		Report	Kanta 64'; Csiki 68'	Stadium: Bozsik József Stadion; Attendance: 1,050; Referee: Csaba Pintér

14 March 2015 20	MTK Budapest	0 – 1	Videoton	Budapest
14:00 CET		Report	Feczesin 78'	Stadium: Bozsik József Stadion; Attendance: 825; Referee: Tamás Bognár

22 March 2015 21	Ferencváros	0 – 2	MTK Budapest	Budapest
16:30 CET	Mateos 36'; Busai 89'	Report		Stadium: Albert Flórián Stadion; Attendance: 8,973; Referee: József Erdős

4 April 2015 22	MTK Budapest	3 – 0	Pápa	Budapest
18:30 CEST	Kanta 19'; Torghelle 58'; Csiki 66'	Report		Stadium: Bozsik József Stadion; Attendance: 420; Referee: Ádám Farkas

11 April 2015 23	Dunaújváros	0 – 0	MTK Budapest	Dunaújváros
14:00 CEST		Report		Stadium: Dunaferr Arena; Attendance: 1,247; Referee: Zoltán Iványi

18 April 2015 24	MTK Budapest	2 – 1	Győr	Budapest
14:00 CEST	Pölöskei 29'; Csiki 60'	Report	Priskin 34'	Stadium: Bozsik József Stadion; Attendance: 1,091; Referee: Péter Solymosi

25 April 2015 25	Nyíregyháza	1 – 1	MTK Budapest	Nyíregyháza
16:00 CEST	Rezes 32'	Report	Thiam 60'	Stadium: Városi Stadion; Attendance: 2,480; Referee: Zoltán Iványi

2 May 2015 26	MTK Budapest	0 – 0	Kecskemét	Budapest
16:00 CEST		Report		Stadium: Bozsik József Stadion; Attendance: 821; Referee: Ferenc Karakó

8 May 2015 27	MTK Budapest	1 – 0	Puskás Akadémia	Budapest
16:00 CEST	Csiki 61'	Report		Stadium: Bozsik József Stadion; Attendance: 627; Referee: Szabolcs Szilasi

16 May 2015 28	Újpest	1 – 0	MTK Budapest	Budapest
14:00 CEST	Litauszki 74'	Report		Stadium: Szusza Ferenc Stadion; Attendance: 1,381; Referee: József Erdős

23 May 2015 29	MTK Budapest	2 – 0	Szombathelyi Haladás	Budapest
16:00 CEST	Torghelle 35', 87'	Report		Stadium: Bozsik József Stadion; Attendance: 768; Referee: Viktor Kassai

31 May 2015 30	Diósgyőr	1 – 0	MTK Budapest	Miskolc
16:30 CEST	Bacsa 18'	Report		Stadium: DVTK Stadion; Attendance: 3,749; Referee: Gábor Oláh

=== Classification ===
Pos	Team	Pld	W	D	L	GF	GA	GD	Pts	Qualification or relegation
1	Videoton (C)	30	22	5	3	64	14	+50	71	Qualification for Champions League second qualifying round
2	Ferencváros	30	19	7	4	49	19	+30	64	Qualification for Europa League first qualifying round
3	MTK	30	18	3	9	39	25	+14	57	Qualification for Europa League first qualifying round
4	Debrecen	30	15	9	6	44	19	+25	54	Qualification for Europa League first qualifying round
5	Paks	30	14	9	7	44	27	+17	51	

Source: mlsz.hu (in Hungarian)
Rules for classification: 1st points; 2nd overall wins; 3rd goal difference; 4th head-to-head points; 5th head-to-head goal difference; 6th head-to-head away goals scored; 7th fair-play points; 8th drawing of lots
(C) Champions

=== Results summary ===
Overall								Home						Away					
Pld	W	D	L	GF	GA	GD	Pts	W	D	L	GF	GA	GD	W	D	L	GF	GA	GD
30	18	3	9	39	25	+14	57	11	1	3	23	9	+14	7	2	6	16	16	0

Last updated: 31 May 2015.
Source: NB1

=== Results by round ===
Round	1	2	3	4	5	6	7	8	9	10	11	12	13	14	15	16	17	18	19	20	21	22	23	24	25	26	27	28	29	30
Ground	A	H	A	H	A	H	A	H	A	H	A	A	H	A	H	H	A	H	A	H	A	H	A	H	A	H	H	A	H	A
Result	W	W	L	W	L	W	W	W	W	W	W	W	L	W	L	W	L	W	W	L	L	W	D	W	D	D	W	L	W	L
Position	1	3	5	4	5	5	4	2	2	2	2	2	2	2	2	2	2	2	2	2	2	2	3	3	3	3	3	3	3	3

Updated to match(es) played on 31 May 2015. Source: Matches
A = Away; H = Home; W = Win; D = Draw; L = Loss

== Hungarian Cup ==
12 August 2014 Round 1	Szentlőrinc	0 – 2	MTK	Szentlőrinc, Baranya County
17:00 CEST		Report	Tamayo 68'; Kanta 85'	Stadium: Városi Sporttelep; Referee: (Hungary) Norbert Kiss

9 September 2014 Round 2	Tevel	2 – 7	MTK	Tevel, Tolna County
15:30 CEST	Ferenc 15'; Simon 81'	Report	Csiki 3'; Kanta 8', 35'; Cseke 13', 73'; Horváth 16', 62'	Stadium: Tevel Sporttelep; Attendance: 650; Referee: (Hungary) Katalin Sipos

24 September 2014 Round 3	Jászapáti	0 – 9	MTK	Jászapáti, Jász-Nagykun-Szolnok County
15:00 CEST		Report	Horváth 31', 89'; Vass 34'; Hrepka 67', 78'; Bese 68'; Pölöskei 72', 75'; Thiam 81'	Stadium: Jászapáti Sporttelep; Attendance: 200; Referee: (Hungary) Katalin Kulcsár

29 October 2014 Round 4	Szolnok	2 – 1	MTK	Szolnok, Jász-Nagykun-Szolnok County
17:00 CET	Nagy 64' (pen.); Rokszin 72'	Report	Pölöskei 28'	Stadium: Tiszaligeti Stadion; Attendance: 500; Referee: (Hungary) József Berger

== League Cup ==
3 September 2014 1	MTK	2 – 3	Dunaújváros	Budapest, Pest County
14:00 CEST	Csiki 31'; Horváth 50'	Report	Jakab 8'; Pascua 14'; Godslove 87'	Stadium: Hidegkuti Nándor Stadium; Attendance: 200; Referee: (Hungary) János Takács

16 September 2014 2	Mezőkövesd	2 – 5	MTK	Mezőkövesd, Borsod-Abaúj-Zemplén County
17:00 CEST	Kálnoki-Kis 43' (o.g.); George 88'	Report	Vass 3'; Csiki 34'; Thiam 54'; Tamayo 66'; Hrepka 80'	Stadium: Városi Stadion; Attendance: 500; Referee: (Hungary) Tamás Nazsa

8 October 2014 3	MTK	2 – 1	Balmazújváros	Budapest, Pest County
13:00 CEST	Hajdú 17'; Hrepka 32'	Report	Pintér 70'	Stadium: Hidegkuti Nándor Stadium; Attendance: on closed Referee: (Hungary) Tamás Takács

14 October 2014 4	Balmazújváros	0 – 3	MTK	Balmazújváros, Hajdú-Bihar County
14:00 CEST		Report	Hajdú 45', 69'; Kanta 67'	Stadium: Batthyány utcai Sportpálya; Attendance: 200; Referee: (Hungary) János Takács

12 November 2014 5	MTK	2 – 1	Mezőkövesd	Budapest, Pest County
13:00 CET	Vass 22'; Csiki 55'	Report	Kulcsár 30'	Stadium: Stadium Sport Street; Attendance: 100; Referee: (Hungary) Béla Botló

18 November 2014 6	Dunaújváros	1 – 2	MTK	Dunaújváros, Fejér County
18:00 CET	Dodlek 32'	Report	Hrepka 21'; Vass 60'	Stadium: Dunaferr Arena; Attendance: 400; Referee: (Hungary) Gábor Oláh

Pos	Team	Pld	W	D	L	GF	GA	GD	Pts	Qualification	MTK	DUN	MEZ	BAL
1	MTK Budapest	6	5	0	1	16	8	+8	15	Advance to knockout phase	—	2–3	2–1	2–1
2	Dunaújváros	6	4	1	1	18	8	+10	13	Advance to knockout phase	1–2	—	6–1	1–1
3	Mezőkövesd	6	2	0	4	13	20	−7	6		2–5	0–4	—	4–2
4	Balmazújváros	6	0	1	5	7	18	−11	1		0–3	2–3	1–5	—

Source: Soccerway
Legend: Blue = home team win; Yellow = draw; Red = away team win.

=== Knockout phase ===
2 December 2014 Round of 16 (leg 1)	Paks	0 – 3	MTK	Paks, Tolna County
13:00 CET		Report	Hajdú 6', 18'; Hrepka 28'	Stadium: Stadion PSE; Attendance: 50; Referee: (Hungary) Péter Solympsi

9 December 2014 Round of 16 (leg 2)	MTK	2 – 1 (5 – 1 agg.)	Paks	Budapest, Pest County
12:00 CET	Vogyicska 57'; Hrepka 75'	Report	Bartha 40'	Stadium: Ikarus Sporttelep; Attendance: 50; Referee: (Hungary) Tamás Nazsa

17 March 2015 Quarter-final (leg 1)	Pécs	0 – 1	MTK Budapest	Pécs
18:00 CET		Report	Tamayo 71'	Stadium: Stadion PMFC; Referee: Balázs Berke

21 April 2015 Quarter-final (leg 2)	MTK Budapest	1 – 0 (2 – 0 agg.)	Pécs	Budapest
17:00 CEST	Horváth 21'	Report		Stadium: Illovszky Rudolf Stadion; Referee: Ferenc Karakó

13 May 2015 Semi-final (leg 1)	Debrecen	3 – 1	MTK Budapest	Debrecen
18:00 CEST	Ludánszki 17'; Tisza 30'; Bereczki 74'	Report	Torghelle 33'	Stadium: Nagyerdei Stadion; Referee: József Erdős

26 May 2015 Semi-final (leg 2)	MTK Budapest	0 – 2 (1 – 5 agg.)	Debrecen	Budapest
18:00 CEST		Report	Ludánszki 82'; Kulcsár 90+1'	Stadium: Illovszky Rudolf Stadion; Referee: Balázs Berke
