= 2015–16 Paksi FC season =

Paks
2015–16 season
- Chairman: János Süli
- Manager: Aurél Csertői
- Stadium: Fehérvári úti Stadion
- Nemzeti Bajnokság I: 7th
- Magyar Kupa: Round of 32
- Top goalscorer: League: János Hahn (7); All: János Hahn (7)
- Highest home attendance: 4,113 (vs Ferencváros, 5 December 2015)
- Lowest home attendance: 743 (vs Debrecen, 26 September 2015)
Home colours	Away colours

The 2015–16 season was Paksi Futball Club's 10th competitive season, 10th consecutive season in the Nemzeti Bajnokság I and 63rd year in existence as a football club. In addition to the domestic league, Paks participated in this season's editions of the Magyar Kupa.

== First team squad ==
The players listed had league appearances and stayed until the end of the season.

Note: Flags indicate national team as defined under FIFA eligibility rules; some limited exceptions apply. Players may hold more than one non-FIFA nationality.

No.	Pos.	Nation	Player
1	GK	HUN	Péter Molnár
5	DF	HUN	Zsolt Gévay
6	MF	HUN	Kristóf Papp
7	MF	HUN	Tamás Báló (captain)
8	MF	HUN	Tamás Kecskés
9	FW	HUN	János Hahn
12	FW	HUN	Richárd Nagy
17	MF	HUN	Dénes Szakály
19	MF	HUN	Barna Kesztyűs
20	DF	HUN	István Rodenbücher
24	GK	HUN	Norbert Csernyánszki
25	GK	HUN	György Székely

No.	Pos.	Nation	Player
26	MF	HUN	Lajos Bertus
27	MF	HUN	Róbert Kővári
28	DF	HUN	Dávid Asztalos
29	FW	HUN	Tamás Koltai
30	DF	HUN	János Szabó
32	DF	HUN	Dávid Kelemen
39	MF	HUN	László Bartha
44	FW	HUN	Bálint Bajner
77	MF	HUN	Dávid Kulcsár
92	FW	HUN	Zsolt Balázs
96	DF	HUN	Bence Lenzsér

== Transfers ==
=== Transfers in ===
Transfer window	Pos.	No.	Player	From
Summer	MF	3	(Hungary) Roland Frőhlich	Pécs
Summer	MF	6	(Hungary) Kristóf Papp	Gyirmót
Summer	FW	15	(Hungary) Antal Péter	Free agent (Note: Previous club: Ferencváros.)
Summer	MF	17	(Hungary) Dénes Szakály	Puskás Akadémia
Summer	GK	25	(Hungary) György Székely	Újbuda
Summer	MF	27	(Hungary) Róbert Kővári	Pécs
Summer	DF	32	(Hungary) Dávid Kelemen	(Israel) Hapoel Tel Aviv
Summer	FW	44	(Hungary) Bálint Bajner	Free agent (Note: Previous club: Notts County.)
Winter	MF	—	(Hungary) Áron Fejős	Youth team

=== Transfers out ===
Transfer window	Pos.	No.	Player	To
Summer	FW	—	(Hungary) Dániel Tóth	Kozármisleny
Summer	MF	21	(Hungary) Zsolt Tamási	Mezőkövesd
Summer	FW	42	(Hungary) Norbert Könyves	Vasas
Summer	FW	46	(Hungary) András Simon	Released (Note: Joined Gyirmót.)
Summer	GK	54	(Hungary) Roland Máté	Ferencváros
Summer	MF	88	(Hungary) Zsolt Haraszti	Ferencváros
Winter	MF	3	(Hungary) Roland Frőhlich	Mezőkövesd
Winter	MF	10	(Hungary) Tamás Kiss	Paks II

=== Loans in ===
Transfer window	Pos.	No.	Player	From	End date
Summer	DF	28	(Hungary) Dávid Asztalos	MTK Budapest	End of season
Summer	FW	29	(Hungary) Tamás Koltai	Videoton	End of season

=== Loans out ===
Transfer window	Pos.	No.	Player	To	End date
Summer	MF	23	(Hungary) Tamás Szekszárdi	Siófok	January 2016
Winter	DF	14	(Hungary) Dávid Bor	Balmazújváros	End of season
Winter	DF	22	(Hungary) András Vági	Mezőkövesd	End of season

== Competitions ==
=== Overview ===
Competition	First match	Last match	Starting round	Final position	Record							
Competition	First match	Last match	Starting round	Final position	Pld	W	D	L	GF	GA	GD	Win %
Nemzeti Bajnokság I	18 July 2015	30 April 2016	Matchday 1	7th	33	12	7	14	41	40	+1	36.36
Magyar Kupa	12 August 2015	14 October 2015	Round of 128	Round of 32	3	2	0	1	11	5	+6	66.67
Total					36	14	7	15	52	45	+7	38.89

Source: Competitions

=== Nemzeti Bajnokság I ===
==== League table ====
Pos	Team	Pld	W	D	L	GF	GA	GD	Pts
5	Haladás	33	13	11	9	33	37	−4	50
6	Újpest	33	11	13	9	42	37	+5	46
7	Paks	33	12	7	14	41	40	+1	43
8	Honvéd	33	12	7	14	40	39	+1	43
9	Diósgyőr	33	10	8	15	37	47	−10	38

Source: Soccerway
Rules for classification: 1) Points; 2) Matches won; 3) Goal difference; 4) Goals scored; 5) Head-to-head points; 6) Head-to-head goal difference; 7) Head-to-head away goals scored; 8) Fairplay; 9) Draw.

==== Results summary ====
Overall								Home						Away					
Pld	W	D	L	GF	GA	GD	Pts	W	D	L	GF	GA	GD	W	D	L	GF	GA	GD
33	12	7	14	41	40	+1	43	9	3	5	29	18	+11	3	4	9	12	22	−10

Source: Hungarian Football Federation

==== Results by round ====
Round	1	2	3	4	5	6	7	8	9	10	11	12	13	14	15	16	17	18	19	20	21	22	23	24	25	26	27	28	29	30	31	32	33
Ground	A	H	A	H	A	H	A	H	H	H	A	H	A	H	A	H	A	H	A	A	A	H	H	A	H	A	H	H	A	H	A	H	A
Result	D	W	L	W	L	D	L	W	D	D	W	W	W	W	D	W	D	L	L	L	L	W	L	L	W	L	L	W	L	L	D	L	W
Position	6	3	5	4	6	6	7	5	6	6	3	3	2	2	2	2	2	2	4	7	7	7	7	7	6	6	7	7	7	7	8	8	7

Source: Matches
A = Away; H = Home; W = Win; D = Draw; L = Loss

==== Matches ====
18 July 2015 1	Újpest	0–0	Paks	Budapest
18:00 CEST (UTC+2)	Litauszki (yellow card) 42'; Kálnoki-Kis (red card) 90+3'	Report	Gévay (yellow card) 28'; Bartha (yellow card) 50'; Bertus (yellow card) 53'	Stadium: Ferenc Szusza Stadium; Attendance: 2,637; Referee: Zsolt Szabó

25 July 2015 2	Paks	4–0	Békéscsaba	Paks
18:00 CEST (UTC+2)	Gévay 9', 73'; Balázs 80'; Szakály 90+1' (pen.)	Report	Korudzhiev (yellow card) 86'; Szalai (yellow card) 90'	Stadium: Fehérvári úti Stadion; Attendance: 1,148; Referee: József Erdős

1 August 2015 3	Puskás Akadémia	1–0	Paks	Felcsút
18:00 CEST (UTC+2)	Pekár 40'; Sallai (yellow card) 77'	Report	Kecskés (yellow card) 51'	Stadium: Pancho Aréna; Attendance: 1,261; Referee: Péter Solymosi

8 August 2015 4	Paks	3–1	Budapest Honvéd	Paks
18:00 CEST (UTC+2)	Szabó 16'; Kulcsár (yellow card) 38'; Balázs 39', 63'; Lenzsér (yellow card) 81'	Report	G. Nagy (yellow card) 29'; Youla (yellow card) 38'; Bobál (yellow card) 79'; Ignjatović 89'; Vernes (yellow card) 90+2'; Baráth (yellow card) 90+4'	Stadium: Fehérvári úti Stadion; Attendance: 1,523; Referee: Tamás Bognár

15 August 2015 5	Haladás	1–0	Paks	Szombathely
18:00 CEST (UTC+2)	Németh 29'; Martínez (yellow card) 30'; Jagodics (yellow card) 55'; Gosztonyi (yellow card) 77'; T. Wils (yellow card) 87'	Report	Bertus (yellow card) 45'; Papp (yellow card) 71'; Kulcsár (yellow card) 82'; Gévay (yellow card) 90'	Stadium: Rohonci Street Stadium; Attendance: 3,148; Referee: József Erdős

22 August 2015 6	Paks	1–1	Diósgyőr	Paks
18:00 CEST (UTC+2)	Hahn 47'; Kulcsár (yellow card) 51'; Gévay (yellow card) 53'; Szabó (yellow card) 87'	Report	Lipták (yellow card) 5'; Nikházi 51' (pen.), (yellow card) 64'; Halmai (yellow card) 68'; Bacsa (yellow card) 73'	Stadium: Fehérvári úti Stadion; Attendance: 1,230; Referee: Csaba Pintér

29 August 2015 7	Ferencváros	2–0	Paks	Budapest
20:30 CEST (UTC+2)	Böde 14'; Lamah 24'; Čukić (yellow card) 89'	Report	Molnár (yellow card) 90+2'	Stadium: Groupama Arena; Attendance: 7,497; Referee: Péter Solymosi

12 September 2015 8	Paks	2–0	Videoton	Paks
18:00 CEST (UTC+2)	Vinícius 28' (o.g.); Papp (yellow card) 48'; Szabó (red card) 50'; Szakály 58' (pen.), (yellow card) 90+3'; Bartha (yellow card) 72'; Lenzsér (yellow card) 73'	Report	Danilović (yellow card) 9'; Suljić (yellow card) 48'; Oliveira (yellow card) 49'; Gyurcsó (yellow card) 83'	Stadium: Fehérvári úti Stadion; Attendance: 1,700; Referee: Zoltán Iványi

19 September 2015 9	Paks	0–0	MTK Budapest	Paks
18:00 CEST (UTC+2)		Report		Stadium: Fehérvári úti Stadion; Attendance: 1,141; Referee: József Erdős

26 September 2015 10	Paks	1–1	Debrecen	Paks
18:00 CEST (UTC+2)	Szabó (yellow card) 14'; Bartha 18'; Kecskés (yellow card) 41'; Balázs (yellow card) 45'; Lenzsér (yellow card) 60'	Report	Korhut (yellow card) 11'; Zsidai (yellow card) 50'; Tisza 63'; Balogh (yellow card) 80'	Stadium: Fehérvári úti Stadion; Attendance: 743; Referee: István Vad

3 October 2015 11	Vasas	1–2	Paks	Budapest
18:00 CEST (UTC+2)	Remili 60'; Osváth (yellow card) 67'; Pavlov (yellow card) 85'; Grúz (yellow card) 90+3'	Report	Koltai 23'; Rodenbücher (yellow card) 40'; Bartha 42'; Papp (yellow card) 90+1'	Stadium: Stadion Rudolf Illovszky; Attendance: 1,500; Referee: Tamás Bognár

17 October 2015 12	Paks	1–0	Újpest	Paks
18:00 CEST (UTC+2)	Kulcsár (yellow card) 64'; Bertus 70'; Bajner (yellow card) 85'	Report	T. Nagy (yellow card) 87'; Heris (yellow card) 90+2'	Stadium: Fehérvári úti Stadion; Attendance: 1,521; Referee: Sándor Andó-Szabó

24 October 2015 13	Békéscsaba	2–3	Paks	Békéscsaba
17:30 CEST (UTC+2)	Birtalan 7', 9'; Szalai (red card) 90+2'	Report	Papp (yellow card) 46', (goal) 54'; Szakály 82'; Bartha 90+7'; Balázs (yellow card) 90+7'	Stadium: Stadion Kórház utcai Attendance: 1,246; Referee: Balázs Berke

31 October 2015 14	Paks	4–2	Puskás Akadémia	Paks
15:30 CET (UTC+1)	Papp (yellow card) 21', (goal) 23', 67'; Hahn (yellow card) 25', (goal) 90+1'; Gévay (yellow card) 25'; Bačelić-Grgić 84' (o.g.)	Report	Márkvárt 27', (yellow card) 41'; Dinjar (yellow card) 72'; Tischler 80'; Herceg (yellow card) 83'	Stadium: Fehérvári úti Stadion; Attendance: 1,186; Referee: Ferenc Karakó

21 November 2015 16	Paks	2–0	Haladás	Paks
15:30 CET (UTC+1)	Lenzsér 49'; Bartha (yellow card) 60'; Kecskés (yellow card) 79'; Bajner 85'; Vági (yellow card) 90+2'	Report	Iszlai (yellow card) 62'; Halmosi (yellow card) 75'	Stadium: Fehérvári úti Stadion; Attendance: 1,078; Referee: István Vad

28 November 2015 17	Diósgyőr	1–1	Paks	Miskolc
15:30 CET (UTC+1)	Kitl (yellow card) 35'; Grumić (red card) 65'; Okuka (yellow card) 80'; Griffiths 87'	Report	Kesztyűs (yellow card) 25'; Balázs 31'; Lenzsér (yellow card) 41'; Kecskés (yellow card) 86'	Stadium: Diósgyőri Stadion; Attendance: 1,951; Referee: Ádám Farkas

2 December 2015 15	Budapest Honvéd	0–0	Paks	Budapest
18:30 CET (UTC+1)	Botka (yellow card) 38'; Hidi (red card) 49'	Report	Lenzsér (yellow card) 56'; Bartha (yellow card) 80'; Kulcsár (yellow card) 90+1'	Stadium: Bozsik József Stadion; Attendance: 500; Referee: Zoltán Iványi
Note: The matches of the 15th round were originally scheduled for 7 November 2015, but was postponed due to HFF decision.

5 December 2015 18	Paks	0–5	Ferencváros	Paks
15:30 CET (UTC+1)	Kecskés (yellow card) 35'; Papp (yellow card) 51'; Báló (yellow card) 59'; Bajner (yellow card) 77'	Report	Lamah 22', (yellow card) 63'; Z. Gera (yellow card) 53'; Šesták 56'; Böde 74'; Dilaver (yellow card) 77'; Busai 88'; Varga 90'	Stadium: Fehérvári úti Stadion; Attendance: 4,113; Referee: Zsolt Szabó

12 December 2015 19	Videoton	1–0	Paks	Székesfehérvár
15:30 CET (UTC+1)	Géresi 81', (yellow card) 88'	Report	Hahn (yellow card) 40'; Kesztyűs (yellow card) 89'	Stadium: Sóstói Stadion; Attendance: 2,531; Referee: Sándor Andó-Szabó

20 February 2016 21	Debrecen	2–0	Paks	Debrecen
15:30 CET (UTC+1)	Sidibe 21' (pen.); Lázár (yellow card) 35'; Holman 44'; Jovanović (yellow card) 70'	Report	Papp (yellow card) 11'; Szakály (yellow card) 88'	Stadium: Nagyerdei Stadion; Attendance: 2,518; Referee: Zoltán Iványi

27 February 2016 22	Paks	3–0	Vasas	Paks
15:30 CET (UTC+1)	Lenzsér (yellow card) 41', (goal) 45'; Kulcsár (yellow card) 50', (goal) 76'; Bartha 58'; Hahn (yellow card) 72'	Report	Adamović (yellow card) 29'; Vida (yellow card) 32'	Stadium: Fehérvári úti Stadion; Attendance: 1,136; Referee: Sándor Andó-Szabó

5 March 2016 23	Paks	0–2	Békéscsaba	Paks
18:00 CET (UTC+1)	Bartha (yellow card) 45'; Koltai (yellow card) 51'; Szakály (yellow card) 90+1'	Report	Eccleston 39'; Bényei (yellow card) 42'; Punoševac 62'; Laczkó (yellow card) 89'; Guarú (yellow card) 90+3'	Stadium: Fehérvári úti Stadion; Attendance: 1,048; Referee: Tamás Bognár

9 March 2016 24	Puskás Akadémia	2–1	Paks	Felcsút
16:00 CET (UTC+1)	Churko 54', (yellow card) 90'; Zsidai (yellow card) 61'; Mészáros 65'; Lyopa (red card) 90+2'	Report	Kecskés (yellow card) 37'; Gévay (yellow card) 61'; Lenzsér (yellow card) 69'; Hahn 84'	Stadium: Pancho Aréna; Attendance: 708; Referee: Ferenc Karakó

12 March 2016 25	Paks	2–0	Vasas	Paks
15:30 CET (UTC+1)	Bartha (yellow card) 17'; Papp (yellow card) 31'; Bertus 33'; Szakály (yellow card) 35'; Bajner (yellow card) 57'; Hahn 79'	Report	Ristevski (yellow card) 24'; Novák (yellow card) 55'; Hangya (yellow card) 83'; Ferenczi (yellow card) 87'; Vida (yellow card) 90+2'	Stadium: Fehérvári úti Stadion; Attendance: 1,072; Referee: Ádám Farkas

19 March 2016 26	Budapest Honvéd	2–0	Paks	Budapest
15:30 CET (UTC+1)	Eppel 7', 62'; Holender (yellow card) 69'	Report	Gévay (yellow card) 35'; Lenzsér (yellow card) 61'	Stadium: Bozsik József Stadion; Attendance: 1,307; Referee: Zsolt Szabó

2 April 2016 28	Paks	4–1	MTK Budapest	Paks
18:30 CEST (UTC+2)	Bertus 16'; D. Szakály 24'; Střeštík 55' (o.g.); Hahn 75', (yellow card) 81'	Report	Vogyicska (yellow card) 29'; Střeštík 50'; Poór (yellow card) 74'; Hrepka (yellow card) 90+2'; Vass (yellow card) 90+2'	Stadium: Fehérvári úti Stadion; Attendance: 1,069; Referee: Zoltán Iványi

6 April 2016 29	Ferencváros	5–2	Paks	Budapest
18:00 CEST (UTC+2)	Radó 6'; Hajnal 21'; Varga (yellow card) 30'; Gyömbér 66', (yellow card) 79'; Nalepa (yellow card) 74'; Kulcsár 82' (o.g.); Lamah 90+2'	Report	Lenzsér (yellow card) 21'; Szakály 34'; Szabó (yellow card) 42'; Kulcsár (yellow card) 43'; Bartha (yellow card) 45'; Hahn 60'; Gévay (yellow card) 66'; Balázs (red card) 67'	Stadium: Groupama Arena; Attendance: 7,594; Referee: Csaba Pintér

9 April 2016 27	Paks	0–1	Debrecen	Paks
20:45 CEST (UTC+2)	Bartha (yellow card) 67'; Bajner (yellow card) 79'	Report	Szabó 28' (o.g.); Lázár (yellow card) 39'; Máté (yellow card) 40'; Bódi (yellow card) 60'	Stadium: Fehérvári úti Stadion; Attendance: 835; Referee: Ádám Németh
Note: The matches of the 27th round were originally scheduled for 30 March 2016, but were postponed to ease the pressure on the tight schedule.

12 April 2016 20	MTK Budapest	1–0	Paks	Dunaújváros
18:00 CEST (UTC+2)	Thiam (yellow card) 23'; Vass (yellow card) 80'; Baki 90+3'	Report	Szabó (yellow card) 36'	Stadium: Dunaújvárosi Stadion; Attendance: 380; Referee: Sándor Andó-Szabó
Note: The match was originally scheduled for 13 February 2016, but was postponed (later a second time) due to the club's employees being diagnosed with bacterial infections.

16 April 2016 30	Paks	0–1	Videoton	Paks
18:00 CEST (UTC+2)	Bartha (yellow card) 40'; Gévay (yellow card) 41'; Kulcsár (yellow card) 53'	Report	Suljić (yellow card) 20'; Simon (yellow card) 28'; Oliveira (yellow card) 36'; Papp 69' (o.g.)	Stadium: Fehérvári úti Stadion; Attendance: 1,674; Referee: Zsolt Szabó

20 April 2016 31	Újpest	1–1	Paks	Budapest
19:00 CEST (UTC+2)	Kabát (yellow card) 51'; Windecker 90+1'	Report	Hahn 18'; Kecskés (yellow card) 76'; Bartha (yellow card) 90+3'	Stadium: Ferenc Szusza Stadium; Attendance: 1,048; Referee: Balázs Berke

23 April 2016 32	Paks	2–3	Haladás	Paks
18:00 CEST (UTC+2)	Hahn (yellow card) 18'; Gévay 26', (red card) 62'; Bertus (yellow card) 34'; Papp 77'; Kecskés (yellow card) 79'; Szabó (red card) 90+2'	Report	Jánvári (yellow card) 17'; Schimmer (yellow card) 31'; Williams (yellow card) 47'; Németh (yellow card) 59'; T. Wils 73'; Rodenbücher 82' (o.g.); Halmosi (yellow card) 83'; Bošnjak (yellow card) 90+1'; Gaál 90+3'	Stadium: Fehérvári úti Stadion; Attendance: 1,114; Referee: Ferenc Karakó

30 April 2016 33	Diósgyőr	0–2	Paks	Miskolc
19:00 CEST (UTC+2)	Nikházi (yellow card) 70'; Okuka (yellow card) 72'; Lipták (yellow card) 90+4'	Report	Kecskés (yellow card) 43', (goal) 90+3'; Bartha 45'; Rodenbücher (yellow card) 69'; Bertus (red card) 79'; Szakály (yellow card) 82'; Báló (yellow card) 90+4'	Stadium: Diósgyőri Stadion; Attendance: 3,268; Referee: József Erdős

=== Magyar Kupa ===
12 August 2015 Round of 128	Maglód	1–6	Paks	Maglód
17:00 CEST (UTC+2)	Rajz 71', (yellow card) 90'; Számpor (yellow card) 78'	Report	Kiss 14', 16'; Bor 26'; Frőhlich 36', 67'; Báló 38'	Stadium: Kertész Károly Stadion; Referee: Márió Görög

23 September 2015 Round of 64	Gyöngyös	0–2 (a.e.t.)	Paks	Gyöngyös
15:00 CEST (UTC+2)	Tarnai (yellow card) 43'; Nádudvari (yellow card) 45'; Czene (yellow card) 85'; Szilágyi (yellow card) 111'	Report	Kesztyűs (yellow card) 45'; Nagy (yellow card) 54', (goal) 116'; Varga (yellow card) 100'; Bor 113'; Rodenbücher (yellow card) 118'	Stadium: Kömlei Károly Városi Sporttelep; Attendance: 500; Referee: Gyöngyi Gaál

14 October 2015 Round of 32	Tiszaújváros	4–3	Paks	Tiszaújváros
14:00 CEST (UTC+2)	Bussy 7', 58'; S. Kovács 17'; L. Molnár (yellow card) 33'; Katona 79'; Czégel (yellow card) 83'	Report	Frőhlich 21' (pen.); Bor 22'; Bertus (yellow card) 30'; Asztalos (red card) 57'; Balázs 86'	Stadium: Tiszaújvárosi Sport Park; Attendance: 500; Referee: Gergely Szőts

== Statistics ==
=== Overall ===
Appearances (Apps) numbers are for appearances in competitive games only, including sub appearances.
Source: Competitions

No.	Player	Pos.	Nemzeti Bajnokság I				Magyar Kupa				Total			
No.	Player	Pos.	Apps	Goal	Booked	Sent off (straight red)	Apps	Goal	Booked	Sent off (straight red)	Apps	Goal	Booked	Sent off (straight red)
1	(Hungary) Péter Molnár	GK	26		1						26		1	
1	(Hungary) Krisztián Pámer	GK												
2	(Hungary) Patrik Bagó	DF					1				1			
3	(Hungary) Roland Frőhlich	FW	6				2	3			8	3		
5	(Hungary) Zsolt Gévay	DF	31	3	8	1					31	3	8	1
6	(Hungary) Kristóf Papp	MF	27	4	8		2				29	4	8	
7	(Hungary) Tamás Báló	MF	4		2		1	1			5	1	2	
8	(Hungary) Tamás Kecskés	MF	23	1	9		2				25	1	9	
9	(Hungary) János Hahn	FW	29	7	5		1				30	7	5	
10	(Hungary) Tamás Kiss	MF	1				1	2			2	2		
12	(Hungary) Richárd Nagy	FW	3				3	1	1		6	1	1	
14	(Hungary) Dávid Bor	DF	1				3	3			4	3		
15	(Hungary) Antal Péter	FW					1				1			
17	(Hungary) Dénes Szakály	MF	25	5	5						25	5	5	
19	(Hungary) Barna Kesztyűs	MF	19		2		2		1		21		3	
20	(Hungary) István Rodenbücher	DF	5		2		3		1		8		3	
21	(Hungary) Zsolt Rácz	MF					1				1			
22	(Hungary) András Vági	DF	6		1		3				9		1	
23	(Hungary) Tamás Szekszárdi	MF												
24	(Hungary) Norbert Csernyánszki	GK	1				1				2			
25	(Hungary) György Székely	GK	6				2				8			
26	(Hungary) Lajos Bertus	MF	33	3	3	1	1		1		34	3	4	1
27	(Hungary) Róbert Kővári	MF	10				3				13			
28	(Hungary) Dávid Asztalos	DF	4				3			1	7			1
29	(Hungary) Tamás Koltai	FW	25	1	1		1				26	1	1	
30	(Hungary) János Szabó	DF	30	1	4	2					30	1	4	2
32	(Hungary) Dávid Kelemen	DF	1								1			
39	(Hungary) László Bartha	MF	31	5	10						31	5	10	
42	(Hungary) Norbert Könyves	FW	3								3			
42	(Hungary) Milán Varga	DF					2		1		2		1	
44	(Hungary) Bálint Bajner	FW	14	1	4						14	1	4	
77	(Hungary) Dávid Kulcsár	MF	32	1	8		1				33	1	8	
92	(Hungary) Zsolt Balázs	FW	31	4	2	1	2	1			33	5	2	1
96	(Hungary) Bence Lenzsér	DF	27	2	9						27	2	9	
Own goals				3								3		
Totals				41	84	5		11	5	1		52	89	6

=== Clean sheets ===
			Clean sheets		
No.	Player	Games Played	Nemzeti Bajnokság I	Magyar Kupa	Total
1	(Hungary) Péter Molnár	26	10		10
25	(Hungary) György Székely	8	0	1	1
24	(Hungary) Norbert Csernyánszki	2	0	0	0
1	(Hungary) Krisztián Pámer	0			0
Totals			10	1	11
