= Balázs Villám =

Hungarian footballer (born 1989)

Personal information
- Full name: Balázs Villám
- Date of birth: 2 June 1989 (age 37)
- Place of birth: Kalocsa, Hungary
- Height: 1.85 m (6 ft 1 in)
- Position: Right back

Team information
- Current team: Iváncsa
- Number: 17

Youth career
- 1997–2006: Kalocsa
- 2006–2008: Vasas

Senior career*
Years	Team	Apps	(Gls)
2008–2010	Vasas	14	(0)
2010–2012	Baja	43	(1)
2012–2016	Dunaújváros	64	(1)
2016	Szolnok	13	(0)
2016–2017	Zalaegerszeg	11	(0)
2017–2018	Budapest Honvéd	7	(0)
2018–2020	Gyirmót	47	(1)
2020–	Iváncsa	7	(0)
- * Club domestic league appearances and goals as of 25 September 2020

Balázs Villám (born 2 June 1989) is a Hungarian football player who currently plays for Iváncsa.

== Career statistics ==
Appearances and goals by club, season and competition
Club	Season	League			Cup		League Cup		Europe		Total	
Club	Season	Division	Apps	Goals	Apps	Goals	Apps	Goals	Apps	Goals	Apps	Goals
Vasas
Vasas	2008–09	Nemzeti Bajnokság I	9	0	0	0	11	0	0	0	20	0
Vasas	2009–10	Nemzeti Bajnokság I	5	0	1	0	6	0	0	0	12	0
Vasas	Total		14	0	1	0	17	0	0	0	32	0
Baja
Baja	2010–11	Nemzeti Bajnokság II	22	0	2	0	0	0	0	0	24	0
Baja	2011–12	Nemzeti Bajnokság II	21	1	6	0	0	0	0	0	27	1
Baja	Total		43	1	8	0	0	0	0	0	51	1
Dunaújváros
Dunaújváros	2012–13	Nemzeti Bajnokság III	25	0	5	1	—		—		30	1
Dunaújváros	2013–14	Nemzeti Bajnokság II	26	1	4	1	1	0	—		31	2
Dunaújváros	2014–15	Nemzeti Bajnokság I	25	0	0	0	5	0	—		30	0
Dunaújváros	2015–16	Nemzeti Bajnokság II	13	0	0	0	—		—		13	0
Dunaújváros	Total		89	1	9	2	6	0	0	0	104	3
Szolnok	2015–16	Nemzeti Bajnokság II	13	0	0	0	—		—		13	0
Zalaegerszeg	2016–17	Nemzeti Bajnokság II	12	0	3	0	—		—		15	0
Budapest Honvéd
Budapest Honvéd	2016–17	Nemzeti Bajnokság I	5	0	0	0	—		—		5	0
Budapest Honvéd	2017–18	Nemzeti Bajnokság I	2	0	2	0	—		—		4	0
Budapest Honvéd	Total		7	0	2	0	0	0	0	0	9	0
Career total			178	2	23	2	23	0	0	0	224	4

Updated to games played as of 29 November 2017.
