= Norbert Sárközi =

Hungarian footballer

Personal information
- Full name: Norbert Sárközi
- Date of birth: 5 March 1993 (age 33)
- Place of birth: Budapest, Hungary
- Height: 1.81 m (5 ft 11 1/2 in)
- Position: Attacking midfielder

Youth career
- 2007–2011: Videoton

Senior career*
Years	Team	Apps	(Gls)
2014–2016	Dunaújváros	28	(0)
2016	FK Csíkszereda	?	(?)
2016–2017	Dabas	?	(?)
2017	FK Csíkszereda	?	(?)
- * Club domestic league appearances and goals as of 28 January 2018

Norbert Sárközi (born 5 March 1993 in Budapest) is a Hungarian football player.

== Career statistics ==
Appearances and goals by club, season and competition
Club	Season	League			Cup		League Cup		Europe		Total	
Club	Season	Division	Apps	Goals	Apps	Goals	Apps	Goals	Apps	Goals	Apps	Goals
Dunaújváros	2013–14	Nemzeti Bajnokság II	12	0	0	0	0	0	0	0	12	0
Dunaújváros	2014–15	Nemzeti Bajnokság I	7	0	0	0	6	0	0	0	13	0
Career total			19	0	0	0	6	0	0	0	25	0

Updated to games played as of 30 November 2014.
