= 2013–14 Nemzeti Bajnokság II =

Nemzeti Bajnokság II
- Season: 2013–14
- Champions: Nyíregyháza; Dunaújváros
- Relegated: Kisvárda; Kozármisleny; Tatabánya

The 2013–2014 Nemzeti Bajnokság II was the 116th season of the Nemzeti Bajnokság II, the second tier of the Hungarian football league.

The 2013–14 Nemzeti Bajnokság II football season was a single sixteen-team league, unlike previous years, which had two geographically-based sixteen-team groups. BFC Siofok and Egri FC were relegated from the 2012–13 Nemzeti Bajnokság I, but Egri FC did not receive a license for the national championship. Eight teams (the teams placed 2nd–5th in both the East and West groups) qualified directly from the 2012–13 Nemzeti Bajnokság II, while the teams placed 6th–8th place competed in play-offs with the group winners of the Nemzeti Bajnokság III to complete the line-up.

== Teams ==
Location of teams in 2013–14 Nemzeti Bajnokság II

=== Stadium and locations ===
Following is the list of clubs competing in 2013–14 Nemzeti Bajnokság II, with their location, stadium and stadium capacity.

| Team | Location | Stadium | Capacity |
|---|---|---|---|
| FC Ajka | Ajka | Stadium Sport Street | 5,000 |
| Balmazújvárosi FC | Balmazújváros | Batthyány utcai Sportpálya | 2,300 |
| Békéscsaba 1912 Előre SE | Békéscsaba | Stadion Kórház utcai | 10,432 |
| Ceglédi VSE | Cegléd | Stadion Malomtó széli | 4,000 |
| Dunaújváros PASE | Dunaújváros | Dunaferr Arena | 12,000 |
| Gyirmót SE | Győr | Ménfői út | 2,700 |
| Kozármisleny SE | Kozármisleny | Stadium Alkotmány Square | 1,500 |
| Nyíregyháza Spartacus | Nyíregyháza | Városi Stadion | 10,300 |
| BFC Siófok | Siófok | Révész Street Stadium | 6,500 |
| Soproni VSE | Sopron | Stadion Városi | 5,300 |
| Szigetszentmiklósi TK | Szigetszentmiklós | Stadium Sport Street | 1,200 |
| Szolnoki MÁV | Szolnok | Tiszaligeti Stadion | 4,000 |
| FC Tatabánya | Tatabánya | Stadion Városi | 5,021 |
| Vasas SC | Budapest | Stadion Rudolf Illovszky | 9,000 |
| Várda SE | Kisvárda | Várkerti Stadion | 2,000 |
| Zalaegerszegi TE | Zalaegerszeg | ZTE Arena | 9,300 |

=== Personnel and kits ===
Following is the list of clubs competing in 2013–14 Nemzeti Bajnokság II, with their manager, captain, kit manufacturer and shirt sponsor.

| Team | Manager | Captain | Kit manufacturer | Shirt sponsor |
|---|---|---|---|---|
| FC Ajka | (Hungary) István Mihalecz | | Legea | Polus Coop Zrt. |
| Balmazújvárosi FC | (Hungary) Gábor Híres | | Nike | |
| Békéscsaba | (Hungary) András Komjáti | | saller | Békés Drén |
| Ceglédi VSE | (Hungary) Zsolt Ványi | | Joma | |
| Dunaújváros PASE | (Hungary) Barna Dobos | | Nike | Epduferr |
| Gyirmót FC | (Hungary) Tibor Sisa | | Jako | Alcufer |
| Kozármisleny SE | (Hungary) Zsolt Szabó | | Royal | — |
| Nyíregyháza Spartacus | (Hungary) Tamás Lucsányszky | | Jako | Révész |
| BFC Siófok | (Hungary) Károly Horváth | | Puma | AVE |
| Soproni VSE | (Hungary) Zoltán Németh | | Givova | Goldschmidt Zrt. |
| Szigetszentmiklósi TK | (Serbia) Zoran Kuntić | | Erima | |
| Szolnoki MÁV | (Hungary) Károly Kis | | hummel | — |
| Tatabánya | (Hungary) László P. Nagy | | Jako | |
| Vasas SC | (Germany) Dirk Berger | | Dragon Sport | — |
| Várda SE | (Hungary) Attila Révész | | Adidas | |
| Zalaegerszegi TE | (Hungary) Antal Simon | | mass | — |

=== Managerial changes ===
| Team | Outgoing manager | Manner of departure | Date of vacancy | Incoming manager | Date of appointment | Note |
|---|---|---|---|---|---|---|
| Gyirmót FC | (Hungary) János Csank | Contract expired | 10 June 2013 | (Hungary) Tibor Sisa | 13 June 2013 | |
| FC Ajka | (Hungary) László Vass | | | (Hungary) István Mihalecz, jr. | 11 June 2013 | |
| Soproni VSE | (Hungary) Zsolt Bücs | Resigned | 17 June 2013 | (Hungary) Attila Supka | 1 July 2013 | |
| Békéscsaba 1912 Előre SE | (Hungary) József Pásztor | Became technical director | 2 July 2013 | (Hungary) András Komjáti | 2 July 2013 | |
| Zalaegerszegi TE | (Hungary) Antal Simon | Sacked | 17 September 2013 | (Hungary) Miklós Lendvai | 17 September 2013 | |
| FC Tatabánya | (Hungary) László P. Nagy | Became assistant | 9 October 2013 | (Hungary) Péter Bozsik | 9 October 2013 | |
| Szigetszentmiklósi TK | (Serbia) Zoran Kuntić | Sacked | 11 October 2013 | (Hungary) Zoltán Csurka | 11 October 2013 | |
| Ceglédi VSE | (Hungary) Zsolt Ványi | Sacked | 28 October 2013 | (Hungary) László Kiss | 28 October 2013 | |
| Kozármisleny SE | (Hungary) Zsolt Szabó | Mutual agreement | 17 November 2013 | (Hungary) Zsolt Németh | 17 November 2013 | |
| Vasas SC | (Germany) Dirk Berger | Resigned | 29 November 2013 | (Hungary) Károly Szanyó | 6 January 2014 | |
| Kozármisleny SE | (Hungary) Zsolt Németh | He was just caretaker | 14 December 2013 | (Portugal) Eduardo Almeida | 14 December 2013 | |
| FC Ajka | (Hungary) István Mihalecz, jr. | Resigned | 4 March 2014 | (Hungary) Péter Jákli | 4 March 2014 | |
| Ceglédi VSE | (Hungary) László Kiss | Sacked | 25 March 2014 | (Hungary) István Szabó | 25 March 2014 | |
| Balmazújvárosi FC | (Hungary) Gábor Híres | Mutual agreement | 7 April 2014 | (Hungary) János Pajkos | 7 April 2014 | |

== League table ==
| Pos | Team | Pld | W | D | L | GF | GA | GD | Pts | Promotion or relegation |
|---|---|---|---|---|---|---|---|---|---|---|
| 1 | Nyíregyháza (P) | 30 | 20 | 6 | 4 | 57 | 23 | +34 | 66 | Promotion to Nemzeti Bajnokság I |
| 2 | Dunaújváros (P) | 30 | 19 | 5 | 6 | 50 | 25 | +25 | 62 | Promotion to Nemzeti Bajnokság I |
| 3 | Gyirmót | 30 | 17 | 6 | 7 | 63 | 33 | +30 | 57 | |
| 4 | Vasas | 30 | 16 | 4 | 10 | 59 | 43 | +16 | 52 | |
| 5 | Siófok | 30 | 13 | 10 | 7 | 44 | 36 | +8 | 49 | |
| 6 | Békéscsaba | 30 | 12 | 7 | 11 | 50 | 43 | +7 | 43 | |
| 7 | Ajka | 30 | 12 | 7 | 11 | 46 | 44 | +2 | 43 | |
| 8 | Balmazújváros | 30 | 11 | 8 | 11 | 49 | 48 | +1 | 41 | |
| 9 | Zalaegerszeg | 30 | 9 | 12 | 9 | 43 | 48 | −5 | 39 | |
| 10 | Sopron | 30 | 10 | 8 | 12 | 40 | 47 | −7 | 38 | |
| 11 | Szigetszentmiklós | 30 | 10 | 7 | 13 | 31 | 41 | −10 | 37 | |
| 12 | Szolnok | 30 | 10 | 6 | 14 | 39 | 41 | −2 | 36 | |
| 13 | Cegléd | 30 | 9 | 4 | 17 | 33 | 53 | −20 | 31 | |
| 14 | Kisvárda (R) | 30 | 7 | 10 | 13 | 39 | 44 | −5 | 31 | Relegation to Nemzeti Bajnokság III |
| 15 | Kozármisleny (R) | 30 | 5 | 6 | 19 | 24 | 49 | −25 | 21 | Relegation to Nemzeti Bajnokság III |
| 16 | Tatabánya (R) | 30 | 4 | 6 | 20 | 24 | 73 | −49 | 18 | Relegation to Nemzeti Bajnokság III |

Source: mlsz.hu (in Hungarian)
Rules for classification: 1st points; 2nd overall wins; 3rd goal difference; 4th head-to-head points; 5th head-to-head goal difference; 6th head-to-head away goals scored; 7th fair-play points; 8th drawing of lots
(P) Promoted; (R) Relegated

=== Positions by round ===
| Team ╲ Round | 1 | 2 | 3 | 4 | 5 | 6 | 7 | 8 | 9 | 10 | 11 | 12 | 13 | 14 | 15 | 16 | 17 | 18 | 19 | 20 | 21 | 22 | 23 | 24 | 25 | 26 | 27 | 28 | 29 | 30 |
|---|---|---|---|---|---|---|---|---|---|---|---|---|---|---|---|---|---|---|---|---|---|---|---|---|---|---|---|---|---|---|
| Ajka | 15 | 15 | 13 | 10 | 6 | 8 | 5 | 4 | 6 | 9 | 7 | 7 | 7 | 6 | 5 | 6 | 6 | 5 | 5 | 5 | 7 | 7 | 6 | 6 | 7 | 7 | 6 | 6 | 7 | 7 |
| Balmazújváros | 14 | 14 | 6 | 3 | 7 | 9 | 6 | 6 | 4 | 2 | 2 | 3 | 5 | 5 | 4 | 4 | 4 | 4 | 4 | 4 | 5 | 6 | 9 | 9 | 9 | 9 | 9 | 8 | 9 | 8 |
| Békéscsaba | 1 | 3 | 5 | 11 | 11 | 6 | 9 | 7 | 10 | 5 | 5 | 5 | 3 | 4 | 7 | 7 | 7 | 7 | 7 | 6 | 4 | 4 | 5 | 5 | 6 | 6 | 7 | 7 | 6 | 6 |
| Cegléd | 12 | 6 | 8 | 6 | 5 | 7 | 10 | 13 | 13 | 13 | 13 | 13 | 14 | 14 | 14 | 13 | 13 | 13 | 14 | 14 | 14 | 14 | 14 | 14 | 14 | 13 | 13 | 13 | 13 | 13 |
| Dunaújváros | 4 | 8 | 4 | 7 | 4 | 4 | 3 | 3 | 3 | 3 | 3 | 2 | 2 | 2 | 2 | 2 | 2 | 2 | 2 | 2 | 2 | 2 | 2 | 2 | 2 | 2 | 2 | 2 | 2 | 2 |
| Gyirmót | 5 | 5 | 7 | 4 | 3 | 3 | 4 | 5 | 7 | 6 | 8 | 8 | 8 | 7 | 6 | 8 | 8 | 8 | 8 | 8 | 6 | 5 | 4 | 4 | 4 | 3 | 3 | 3 | 3 | 3 |
| Kozármisleny | 10 | 12 | 15 | 15 | 16 | 16 | 16 | 15 | 16 | 14 | 15 | 15 | 16 | 16 | 16 | 16 | 16 | 16 | 16 | 16 | 15 | 15 | 15 | 15 | 15 | 15 | 15 | 15 | 15 | 15 |
| Nyíregyháza | 3 | 1 | 1 | 1 | 1 | 1 | 1 | 1 | 1 | 1 | 1 | 1 | 1 | 1 | 1 | 1 | 1 | 1 | 1 | 1 | 1 | 1 | 1 | 1 | 1 | 1 | 1 | 1 | 1 | 1 |
| Siófok | 2 | 2 | 2 | 2 | 2 | 2 | 2 | 2 | 2 | 4 | 4 | 4 | 4 | 3 | 3 | 3 | 3 | 3 | 3 | 3 | 3 | 3 | 3 | 3 | 3 | 4 | 4 | 5 | 5 | 5 |
| Sopron | 7 | 4 | 3 | 5 | 8 | 10 | 12 | 14 | 14 | 15 | 14 | 14 | 13 | 13 | 11 | 9 | 10 | 10 | 10 | 10 | 11 | 12 | 10 | 11 | 11 | 11 | 10 | 11 | 10 | 10 |
| Szigetszentmiklós | 6 | 7 | 10 | 13 | 9 | 12 | 13 | 9 | 11 | 7 | 9 | 10 | 11 | 10 | 10 | 12 | 11 | 12 | 11 | 11 | 10 | 13 | 13 | 12 | 12 | 12 | 11 | 12 | 12 | 11 |
| Szolnok | 11 | 11 | 12 | 14 | 15 | 13 | 14 | 12 | 12 | 12 | 12 | 12 | 10 | 12 | 13 | 11 | 9 | 11 | 13 | 12 | 13 | 11 | 11 | 10 | 10 | 10 | 12 | 10 | 11 | 12 |
| Tatabánya | 16 | 16 | 9 | 12 | 14 | 15 | 15 | 16 | 15 | 16 | 16 | 16 | 15 | 15 | 15 | 15 | 15 | 15 | 15 | 15 | 16 | 16 | 16 | 16 | 16 | 16 | 16 | 16 | 16 | 16 |
| Vasas | 13 | 13 | 16 | 16 | 13 | 11 | 7 | 10 | 8 | 11 | 11 | 9 | 9 | 9 | 9 | 10 | 12 | 9 | 9 | 9 | 8 | 8 | 7 | 8 | 5 | 5 | 5 | 4 | 4 | 4 |
| Várda | 8 | 9 | 11 | 8 | 10 | 5 | 8 | 11 | 9 | 10 | 10 | 11 | 12 | 11 | 12 | 14 | 14 | 14 | 12 | 13 | 12 | 10 | 12 | 13 | 13 | 14 | 14 | 14 | 14 | 14 |
| Zalaegerszeg | 9 | 10 | 14 | 9 | 12 | 14 | 11 | 8 | 5 | 8 | 6 | 6 | 6 | 8 | 8 | 5 | 5 | 6 | 6 | 7 | 9 | 9 | 8 | 7 | 8 | 8 | 8 | 9 | 8 | 9 |

Updated to match(es) played on 1 June 2014. Source: mlsz.hu (in Hungarian)
= Promotion to 2014–15 Nemzeti Bajnokság I; = Relegation to 2014–15 Nemzeti Bajnokság III

== Results ==
| Home \ Away | AJK | BAL | BÉK | CEG | DUN | GYI | KOZ | NYÍ | SIÓ | SOP | SZI | SZL | TAT | VAS | VÁR | ZTE |
|---|---|---|---|---|---|---|---|---|---|---|---|---|---|---|---|---|
| Ajka | | 3–2 | 2–0 | 1–0 | 1–2 | 1–2 | 2–0 | 0–3 | 4–1 | 0–0 | 0–0 | 2–0 | 3–0 | | 2–5 | 1–1 |
| Balmazújváros | 1–1 | | 0–3 | 0–1 | 2–3 | 1–2 | 3–1 | 2–2 | 2–2 | 3–3 | 2–1 | 2–0 | 4–0 | 1–0 | 3–3 | 2–0 |
| Békéscsaba | 3–2 | 1–2 | | 3–3 | 0–3 | 1–2 | 2–1 | 2–3 | 2–2 | 2–0 | 0–1 | 1–1 | 4–0 | 1–1 | 2–1 | 0–0 |
| Cegléd | 0–0 | 0–1 | 2–7 | | 2–1 | 0–4 | 3–2 | 1–1 | 1–0 | 3–3 | 1–0 | 1–2 | 1–0 | 2–3 | 4–1 | 0–1 |
| Dunaújváros | 2–1 | 1–0 | | 2–0 | | 2–0 | 3–0 | 0–1 | 1–0 | 3–1 | 2–0 | 0–0 | 1–1 | 2–0 | 1–0 | 3–0 |
| Gyirmót | 3–0 | 4–1 | 1–2 | 3–0 | 1–0 | | 3–1 | 1–1 | 0–1 | 3–2 | 2–0 | 3–4 | | 4–0 | 1–1 | 5–1 |
| Kozármisleny | 0–1 | 1–1 | 2–1 | 2–3 | 0–1 | 1–2 | | | 0–1 | 0–1 | 1–1 | 2–1 | 1–0 | 1–3 | 3–1 | 0–0 |
| Nyíregyháza | 1–0 | 2–4 | 2–0 | 1–0 | 4–0 | 2–2 | 3–1 | | 2–2 | 0–1 | 6–1 | 1–0 | 2–0 | 4–0 | 1–0 | 3–0 |
| Siófok | 0–3 | 3–0 | 0–3 | 1–0 | 0–0 | 2–0 | 0–0 | 1–1 | | | 1–0 | 2–2 | 5–2 | 1–5 | 2–0 | 3–3 |
| Sopron | 3–4 | 2–1 | 1–2 | 2–3 | 1–2 | 1–1 | 1–1 | 0–1 | 1–0 | | 1–0 | 2–0 | 3–1 | 0–0 | 3–1 | 3–3 |
| Szigetszentmiklós | 3–0 | 0–3 | 0–3 | 1–0 | 2–1 | 1–1 | 2–0 | 1–0 | 2–2 | 1–0 | | 1–0 | 3–0 | 1–2 | 1–1 | |
| Szolnok | 1–0 | | 3–1 | 2–1 | 3–2 | 2–3 | 3–0 | 1–0 | 1–2 | 1–2 | 1–1 | | 4–0 | 3–1 | 1–3 | 0–1 |
| Tatabánya | 2–3 | 2–1 | 0–0 | 2–1 | 1–4 | 0–1 | 0–0 | 1–2 | 0–1 | 1–2 | 3–2 | 1–1 | | 3–2 | 1–1 | 1–2 |
| Vasas | 1–5 | 3–0 | 1–1 | 3–0 | 1–2 | 2–1 | 4–0 | 1–2 | 0–2 | 1–0 | 1–1 | 3–1 | 5–0 | | 4–1 | 2–0 |
| Várda | 0–0 | 1–1 | 1–2 | | 1–1 | 0–0 | 0–2 | 0–1 | 0–2 | 1–1 | 2–0 | 1–0 | 5–0 | 2–3 | | 3–1 |
| Zalaegerszegi TE | 2–2 | 2–2 | 3–1 | 2–0 | 2–2 | 3–1 | 2–1 | 1–4 | 1–1 | 4–0 | 4–2 | 0–0 | 2–2 | 0–1 | 1–1 | |

Updated to match(es) played on 27 May 2014. Source: mlsz.hu (in Hungarian)
Legend: Blue = home team win; Yellow = draw; Red = away team win.

== Top goalscorers ==
Including matches played on 1 June 2014; Source:

| Rank | Scorer | Club | Goals |
|---|---|---|---|
| 1 | (Hungary) Péter Bajzát | Nyíregyháza | 25 |
| 2 | (Hungary) Péter Urbin | Balmazújváros (15); Dunaújváros (7) | 22 |
| 3 | (Hungary) Mohamed Remili | Vasas SC | 17 |
| 4 | (Hungary) Márton Oross | Gyirmót | 14 |
| 4 | (Hungary) Thomas Sowunmi | FC Ajka | 14 |
| 4 | (Hungary) Gergő Beliczky | Gyirmót | 14 |
| 7 | (Serbia) Nikola Pantović | Békéscsaba | 12 |
| 8 | (Hungary) Norbert Major | FC Ajka | 11 |
| 9 | (Montenegro) Darko Pavićević | ZTE | 10 |
| 9 | (Serbia) Tamás Takács | SZTK | 10 |

== See also ==
- 2013–14 Magyar Kupa
- 2013–14 Nemzeti Bajnokság I
- 2013–14 Nemzeti Bajnokság III
