= Dávid Jakab =

Hungarian footballer (born 1993)

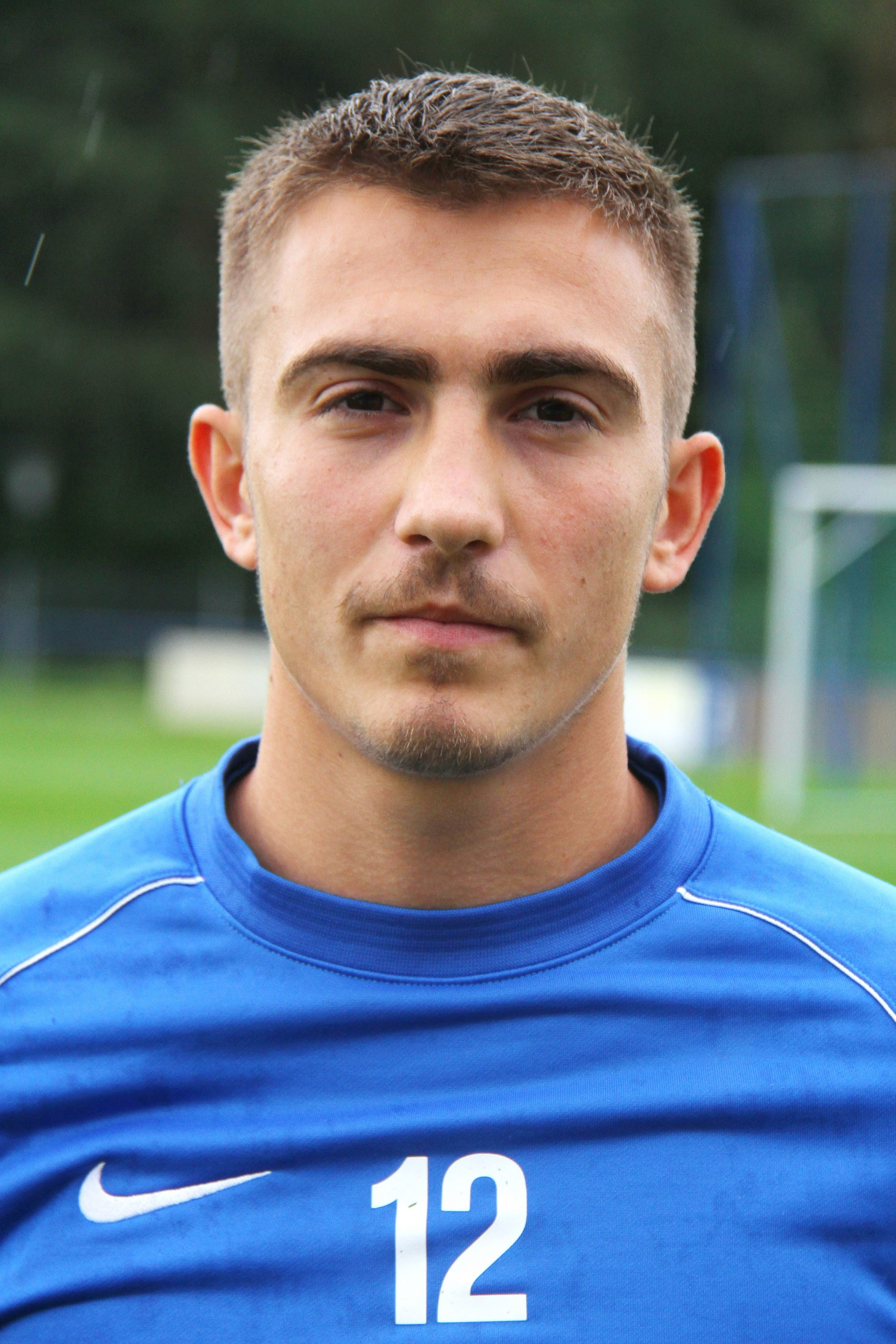
- Jakab with MTK Budapest in 2016

Personal information
- Date of birth: 21 May 1993 (age 33)
- Place of birth: Budapest, Hungary
- Height: 1.78 m (5 ft 10 in)
- Position: Attacking midfielder

Youth career
- 2002–2003: Rákosmenti KSK
- 2003–2010: Rákosmenti TK

Senior career*
Years	Team	Apps	(Gls)
2010–2012	Ecser	9	(2)
2012	Szentmártonkáta	12	(9)
2012–2013	Maglód	12	(4)
2013–2015	Dunaújváros	55	(8)
2013–2014	Dunaújváros II	7	(2)
2015–2017	MTK II	7	(4)
2016–2018	MTK	21	(0)
2016–2017	→ ZTE (loan)	20	(6)
2018–2020	Győr	16	(4)
2019	→ Mosonmagyaróvár (loan)	2	(0)
2020–2021	Kecskemét	29	(9)
2021–2023	Dunaújváros	48	(17)
2023–2024	Kazincbarcika	0	(0)
2023	Bánhorváti	2	(1)
2024	Dunaújváros	13	(1)
- * Club domestic league appearances and goals as of 26 May 2024

Dávid Jakab (born 21 May 1993) is a Hungarian professional footballer who last played for Dunaújváros.

== Club career ==
On 2 September 2016, Jakab joined Nemzeti Bajnokság II club ZTE on loan until the end of the 2016–17 season.

On 9 August 2019, he was sent on a half-season loan to Nemzeti Bajnokság III club Mosonmagyaróvár.

== Career statistics ==
As of match played 26 May 2024

Appearances and goals by club, season and competition
Club	Season	League			National cup (Note: Includes Magyar Kupa)		League cup (Note: Includes Ligakupa)		Europe		Other		Total	
Club	Season	Division	Apps	Goals	Apps	Goals	Apps	Goals	Apps	Goals	Apps	Goals	Apps	Goals
Ecser	2010–11	Megyei Bajnokság III	9	2	—		—		—		1 (Note: Appearances in Megyei Bajnokság III play-offs)	0	10	2
Szentmártonkáta	2011–12	Megyei Bajnokság I	12	9	—		—		—		—		12	9
Maglód	2012–13	Nemzeti Bajnokság III	12	4	1	2	—		—		—		13	6
Dunaújváros	2012–13	Nemzeti Bajnokság III	4	0	—		—		—		3 (Note: Appearances in Magyar Kupa qualifying rounds)	2	7	2
Dunaújváros	2013–14	Nemzeti Bajnokság II	17	4	2	0	4	0	—		—		23	4
Dunaújváros	2014–15	Nemzeti Bajnokság I	19	1	1	0	7	2	—		—		27	3
Dunaújváros	2015–16	Nemzeti Bajnokság II	15	3	1	0	—		—		—		16	3
Dunaújváros	Total		55	8	4	0	11	2	—		3	2	73	12
Dunaújváros II	2013–14	Megyei Bajnokság I	5	2	—		—		—		—		5	2
Dunaújváros II	2014–15	Megyei Bajnokság I	2	2	—		—		—		—		2	2
Dunaújváros II	Total		7	2	—		—		—		—		7	2
MTK II	2015–16	Nemzeti Bajnokság III	2	1	—		—		—		—		2	1
MTK II	2017–18	Nemzeti Bajnokság III	5	3	—		—		—		—		5	3
MTK II	Total		7	4	—		—		—		—		7	4
MTK	2016–17	Nemzeti Bajnokság I	4	0	—		—		2 (Note: Appearances in UEFA Europa League)	0	—		6	0
MTK	2017–18	Nemzeti Bajnokság II	17	0	7	0	—		—		—		24	0
MTK	Total		21	0	7	0	—		2	0	—		30	0
Zalaegerszeg (loan)	2016–17	Nemzeti Bajnokság II	20	6	4	1	—		—		—		24	7
Győr	2018–19	Nemzeti Bajnokság II	16	4	1	1	—		—		—		17	5
Mosonmagyaróvár (loan)	2019–20	Nemzeti Bajnokság III	2	0	—		—		—		—		2	0
Kecskemét	2020–21	Nemzeti Bajnokság III	29	9	1	0	—		—		—		30	9
Dunaújváros	2021–22	Nemzeti Bajnokság III	29	9	—		—		—		—		29	9
Dunaújváros	2022–23	Nemzeti Bajnokság III	19	8	2	2	—		—		—		21	10
Dunaújváros	Total		48	17	2	2	—		—		—		50	19
Kazincbarcika	2022–23	Nemzeti Bajnokság II	0	0	—		—		—		—		0	0
Bánhorváti	2022–23	Megyei Bajnokság I	2	1	—		—		—		—		2	1
Dunaújváros	2023–24	Nemzeti Bajnokság III	13	1	—		—		—		—		13	1
Career total			253	69	20	6	11	2	2	0	4	2	290	79
