= Dávid Kelemen =

Hungarian footballer (born 1992)

- Kelemen playing for Békéscsaba in 2026

Personal information
- Date of birth: 24 May 1992 (age 34)
- Place of birth: Békéscsaba, Hungary
- Height: 1.85 m (6 ft 1 in)
- Position: Defender

Team information
- Current team: Videoton
- Number: 5

Youth career
- 2002–2006: Békéscsaba
- 2006–2010: MTK Budapest

Senior career*
Years	Team	Apps	(Gls)
2010–2015	MTK Budapest	42	(0)
2015	Hapoel Tel Aviv	0	(0)
2015–2017	Paks	1	(0)
2016–2017	→ Békéscsaba (loan)	31	(3)
2017–2018	Nyíregyháza	25	(2)
2018–2022	Paks	10	(1)
2018–2019	→ Vasas (loan)	24	(0)
2020	→ Haladás (loan)	2	(0)
2020–2022	→ FK Csíkszereda (loan)	40	(1)
2022–2026	FK Csíkszereda	80	(3)
2026	Békéscsaba	13	(0)
2026–	Videoton	7	(0)

International career
2008–2009	Hungary U17		
2009–2011	Hungary U19	8	(0)
2011–2012	Hungary U20	2	(0)
2012–2014	Hungary U21	8	(0)
- * Club domestic league appearances and goals as of 19 September 2026

Dávid Kelemen (born 24 May 1992) is a Hungarian professional footballer who plays as a defender for Nemzeti Bajnokság II club Videoton.

== Career statistics ==
As of match played 2 August 2025

Appearances and goals by club, season and competition
Club	Season	League			National cup (Note: Includes Magyar Kupa, Cupa României)		League cup (Note: Includes Ligakupa)		Europe		Other		Total	
Club	Season	Division	Apps	Goals	Apps	Goals	Apps	Goals	Apps	Goals	Apps	Goals	Apps	Goals
MTK Budapest	2010–11	Nemzeti Bajnokság I	3	0	0	0	4	0	—		—		7	0
MTK Budapest	2011–12	Nemzeti Bajnokság II	4	0	0	0	7	1	—		—		11	1
MTK Budapest	2012–13	Nemzeti Bajnokság I	17	0	0	0	3	0	2 (Note: Appearances in UEFA Europa League)	0	—		22	0
MTK Budapest	2013–14	Nemzeti Bajnokság I	8	0	5	0	1	0	—		—		14	0
MTK Budapest	2014–15	Nemzeti Bajnokság I	10	0	1	0	4	0	—		—		15	0
MTK Budapest	Total		42	0	6	0	19	1	2	0	—		69	1
Paks	2015–16	Nemzeti Bajnokság I	1	0	0	0	—		—		—		1	0
Békéscsaba (loan)	2016–17	Nemzeti Bajnokság II	31	3	2	0	—		—		—		33	3
Nyíregyháza	2017–18	Nemzeti Bajnokság II	25	2	2	0	—		—		—		27	2
Paks	2019–20	Nemzeti Bajnokság I	10	1	3	0	—		—		—		13	1
Vasas (loan)	2018–19	Nemzeti Bajnokság II	24	0	2	0	—		—		—		26	0
Haladás (loan)	2020–21	Nemzeti Bajnokság II	2	0	1	0	—		—		—		3	0
FK Csíkszereda (loan)	2020–21	Liga II	21	1	1	0	—		—		—		22	1
FK Csíkszereda (loan)	2021–22	Liga II	19	0	1	0	—		—		—		16	0
FK Csíkszereda	2022–23	Liga II	21	2	1	0	—		—		—		22	2
FK Csíkszereda	2023–24	Liga II	26	1	0	0	—		—		2 (Note: Appearance in Liga I promotion/relegation play-offs)	0	28	1
FK Csíkszereda	2024–25	Liga II	29	0	3	0	—		—		—		32	0
FK Csíkszereda	2025–26	Liga I	4	0	0	0	—		—		—		4	0
FK Csíkszereda	Total		120	4	6	0	—		—		2	0	128	4
Career total			255	10	22	0	19	1	2	0	2	0	300	11

== Honours ==
MTK Budapest

- Magyar Kupa runner-up: 2011–12
