= Dávid Asztalos =

Hungarian footballer

Personal information
- Date of birth: 9 May 1995 (age 31)
- Place of birth: Cegléd, Hungary
- Height: 1.82 m (6 ft 0 in)
- Positions: Defender; forward

Team information
- Current team: Hódmezővásárhely

Youth career
- 2005–2009: Cegléd
- 2009–2014: MTK

Senior career*
Years	Team	Apps	(Gls)
2014–2015	MTK	1	(0)
2015–2016	→ Paks (loan)	4	(1)
2016–2017	→ Cegléd (loan)	27	(4)
2017–2018	→ Cegléd (loan)	36	(12)
2018–2019	Cegléd	14	(0)
2019	Monor	14	(3)
2019–2021	Kecskemét	47	(5)
2021–2022	Jászberény	19	(2)
2022–	Hódmezővásárhely	12	(2)

International career
2011–2012	Hungary U17	9	(2)
2013–2014	Hungary U19	6	(0)
2014	Hungary U20	2	(0)
- * Club domestic league appearances and goals as of 1 May 2022

Dávid Asztalos (born 9 May 1995) is a Hungarian football player who plays for Hódmezővásárhely.

== International career ==
He was part of the Hungarian U-19 at the 2014 UEFA European Under-19 Championship.
