= Péter Urbin =

Hungarian footballer (born 1984)

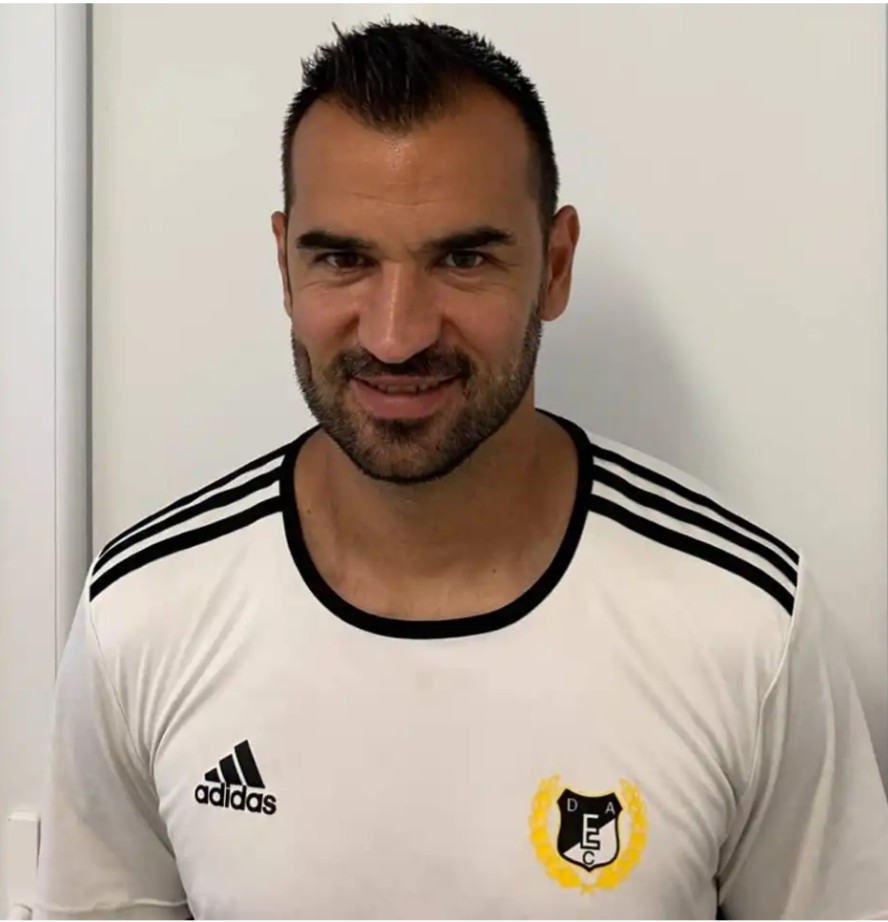
- Péter Urbin

Personal information
- Full name: Péter Urbin
- Date of birth: 17 September 1984 (age 42)
- Place of birth: Debrecen, Hungary
- Height: 1.86 m (6 ft 1 in)
- Position: Forward

Team information
- Current team: DEAC (manager)

Youth career
- 2002–2003: Újpest

Senior career*
Years	Team	Apps	(Gls)
2003–2006	Debrecen	1	(0)
2004–2005	→ Létavértes (loan)		
2005–2006	→ Nyíregyháza (loan)	11	(1)
2006	→ Diósgyőr (loan)	9	(0)
2006–2010	Bőcs	93	(46)
2008–2009	→ Debrecen II (loan)	12	(6)
2010–2011	Hajdúböszörmény	14	(2)
2011	Bőcs	14	(2)
2011–2014	Balmazújváros	74	(49)
2014	→ Dunaújváros (loan)	14	(7)
2014	Dunaújváros	3	(0)
2014–2016	Szolnok	28	(8)
2016–2019	Békéscsaba	97	(29)
2019–2021	DEAC	33	(6)
2021	Tiszafüred VSE	4	(1)

Managerial career
- 2023–: DEAC
- * Club domestic league appearances and goals as of 17:56, 24 March 2021 (UTC)

Péter Urbin (born 17 September 1984) is a Hungarian football manager and former professional player who is currently the manager of Nemzeti Bajnokság III club DEAC.

== Managerial career ==
On 27 June 2023, Urbin was appointed manager of Nemzeti Bajnokság III club DEAC, replacing Tamás Sándor, who departed after three years in charge.
