= Timotej Dodlek =

Slovenian football midfielder

Personal information
- Date of birth: 23 November 1989 (age 36)
- Place of birth: Maribor, SFR Yugoslavia
- Height: 1.83 m (6 ft 0 in)
- Position: Midfielder

Team information
- Current team: Rače

Youth career
- –2008: Maribor

Senior career*
Years	Team	Apps	(Gls)
2007–2014	Maribor	84	(1)
2008–2009	→ Nafta Lendava (loan)	13	(1)
2009	→ Šenčur (loan)	3	(0)
2011–2012	→ Mura 05 (loan)	27	(1)
2014	Dunaújváros	6	(0)
2016	Zavrč	12	(0)
2017	Utenis Utena	16	(1)
2017–2018	Hrvatski Dragovoljac	3	(0)
2018	Bačka BP	5	(2)
2019–2020	Fužinar	29	(2)
2020–2021	Koper	34	(0)
2021–2022	Aluminij	7	(0)
2022	ASK Voitsberg	11	(0)
2022–2024	SV Rottenmann	37	(11)
2024–	Rače		

International career
2007	Slovenia U18	1	(0)
- * Club domestic league appearances and goals

Timotej Dodlek (born 23 November 1989) is a Slovenian footballer who plays as a midfielder for Rače.

== Career ==
Dodlek started his senior career at Maribor, and played with the team between 2007 and 2014. In between he had loan spells with Slovenian sides Nafta Lendava, Šenčur and Mura 05.

In 2014, Dodlek left Maribor and moved to Hungary, where he played with Dunaújváros in the Nemzeti Bajnokság I. Then, after a short spell back in Slovenia with Zavrč, he joined Lithuanian A Lyga side Utenis Utena on 28 February 2017. Dodlek then returned to the region of former Yugoslavia. He played the first half of the 2017–18 season in Croatia with Hrvatski Dragovoljac, and the second half of the season in Serbia with Bačka Bačka Palanka, a newly promoted club of the Serbian SuperLiga.

== Personal life ==
His younger brother, Sven, is also a footballer.

== Honours ==
Maribor

- Slovenian PrvaLiga: 2010–11, 2012–13, 2013–14
- Slovenian Cup: 2010, 2013
- Slovenian Supercup: 2013, 2014
