= Bruno Pascua =

Spanish footballer

Personal information
- Full name: Bruno Pascua López
- Date of birth: 21 January 1990 (age 36)
- Place of birth: Santander, Spain
- Height: 1.70 m (5 ft 7 in)
- Position: Forward

Team information
- Current team: Vimenor

Youth career
- 2008–2012: Racing Santander

Senior career*
Years	Team	Apps	(Gls)
2012–2013	Racing Santander B	31	(3)
2013–2014	Gimnástica	10	(1)
2014–2015	Dunaújváros	6	(0)
2015	Grindavík	?	(?)
2015	Urraca	4	(0)
2016–2017	Nacional Potosí	54	(11)
2017–2018	Universitario de Sucre	33	(5)
2018	Ourense	14	(3)
2019	Nacional Potosí	47	(14)
2020–2021	Guabirá	42	(7)
2022	Real Tomayapo	4	(1)
2023–2024	Laredo	15	(0)
2024–	Vimenor	6	(0)
- * Club domestic league appearances and goals as of 12 October 2024

Bruno Pascua López (Note: In this Spanish name, the first or paternal surname is Pascua and the second or maternal family name is López.) (born 21 January 1990) is a Spanish football player who plays for Vimenor.

== Club statistics ==
Club	Season	League		Cup		League Cup		Europe		Total	
Club	Season	Apps	Goals	Apps	Goals	Apps	Goals	Apps	Goals	Apps	Goals
Dunaújváros
Dunaújváros	2014–15	6	0	1	0	7	1	0	0	14	1
Dunaújváros	Total	6	0	1	0	7	1	0	0	14	1
Career Total		6	0	1	0	7	1	0	0	14	1

Updated to games played as of 2 December 2014.
