= Zsolt Németh (footballer) =

Slovak footballer

Personal information
- Full name: Zsolt Németh
- Date of birth: 1 February 1991 (age 35)
- Place of birth: Czechoslovakia
- Height: 1.76 m (5 ft 9 1/2 in)
- Position: Left back

Team information
- Current team: Gyirmót SE
- Number: 88

Youth career
- Dunajská Streda

Senior career*
Years	Team	Apps	(Gls)
2008–2017	Dunajská Streda	40	(2)
2013–2015	→ Komárno (loan)		
2015	→ Veľký Meder (loan)		
2016	→ Komárno (loan)		
2017–	Gyirmót SE	4	(0)

International career
- Slovakia U-19
- * Club domestic league appearances and goals as of 3 September 2017

Zsolt Németh (born 1 February 1991) is a Slovak football defender of Hungarian ethnicity who plays for Gyirmót SE.
