= Egejuru Godslove Ukwuoma =

Nigerian footballer

Egejuru Godslove
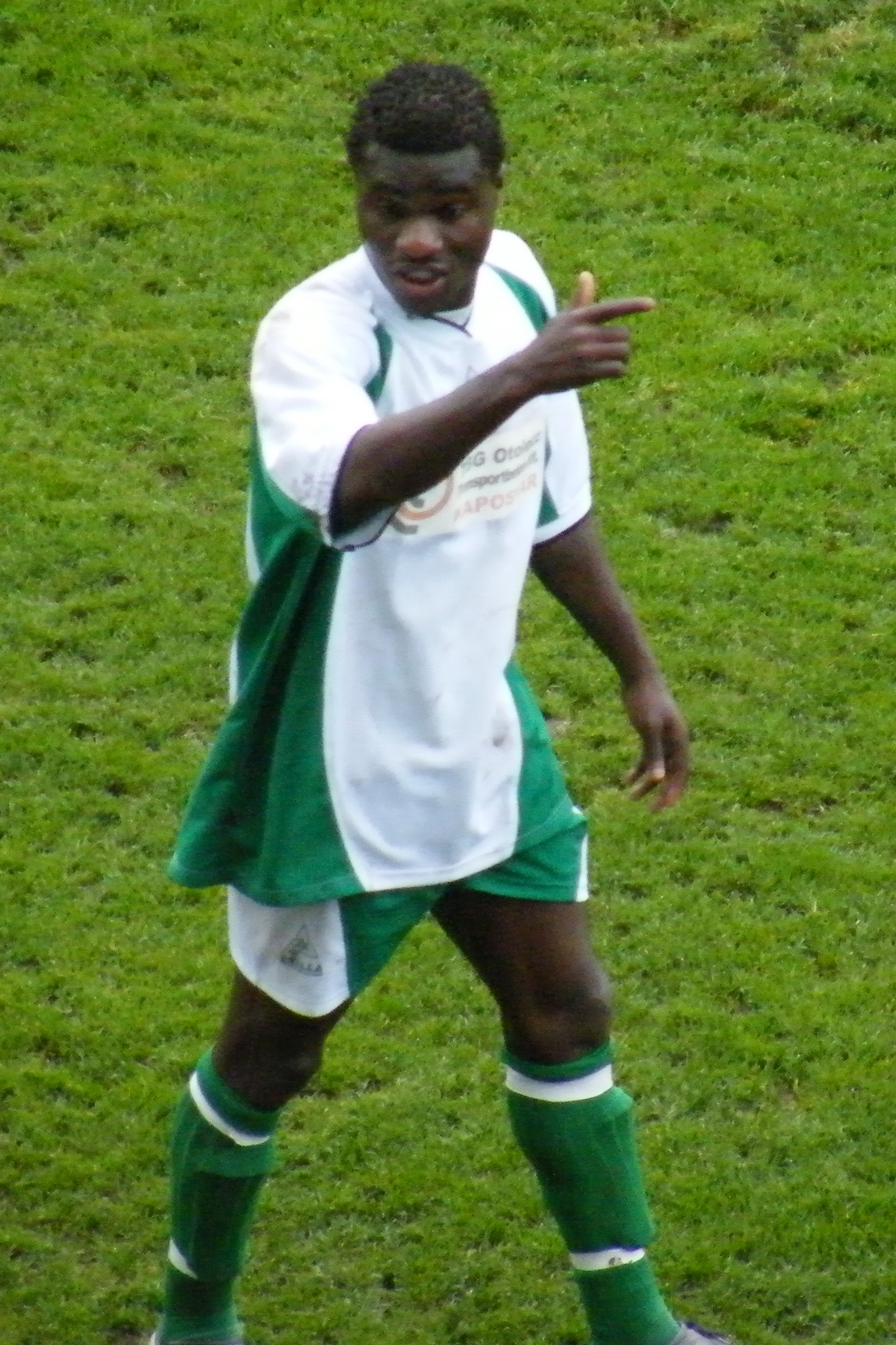

Personal information
- Full name: Egejuru Godslove Ukwuoma
- Date of birth: December 4, 1986 (age 39)
- Place of birth: Lagos, Nigeria
- Height: 1.78 m (5 ft 10 in)
- Position: Forward

Team information
- Current team: Dunaújváros
- Number: 17

Senior career*
Years	Team	Apps	(Gls)
2006–2007	Csurgó	1	(0)
2007–2010	Kaposvölgye	71	(21)
2010–2011	Kaposvár	18	(0)
2011–2012	Pécs	13	(0)
2011	→ Kozármisleny (loan)	15	(1)
2012–	Dunaújváros	74	(27)
- * Club domestic league appearances and goals as of 7 December 2014

Egejuru Godslove (born December 4, 1986, in Lagos) is a Nigerian footballer who currently plays for Dunaújváros PASE.
