= György Székely =

Hungarian footballer

Personal information
- Full name: György Zsolt Székely
- Date of birth: 2 June 1995 (age 31)
- Place of birth: Budapest, Hungary
- Height: 1.88 m (6 ft 2 in)
- Position: Goalkeeper

Team information
- Current team: 1860 Munich
- Number: 12

Youth career
- 2000–2002: Budapest Honvéd
- 2002–2005: MTK Budapest
- 2005–2007: Goldball '94 FC
- 2007–2009: TSV Milbertshofen
- 2009–2011: SV Planegg-Krailling
- 2011–2014: 1860 Munich

Senior career*
Years	Team	Apps	(Gls)
2014	1860 Munich II	0	(0)
2015	Újbuda	5	(0)
2015–2017	Paks II	20	(0)
2015–2017	Paks	8	(0)
2018	Schott Mainz	3	(0)
2018–2022	1860 Munich II	31	(0)
2020–2022	1860 Munich	0	(0)

International career
2011	Hungary U17	1	(0)
2013	Hungary U18	1	(0)
2014	Hungary U19	8	(0)
2015	Hungary U20	5	(0)
- * Club domestic league appearances and goals

György Zsolt Székely (born 2 June 1995) is a Hungarian former professional footballer who played as a goalkeeper.

== Career ==
Székely made his professional debut for Paks in the Nemzeti Bajnokság I on 5 December 2015, starting in the home match against Ferencváros, which finished as a 5–0 loss.
