= Sergio Tamayo =

Spanish footballer

Personal information
- Full name: Sergio Fernández Tamayo
- Date of birth: 28 March 1991 (age 35)
- Place of birth: Logroño, Spain
- Height: 1.77 m (5 ft 9 1/2 in)
- Position: Forward

Team information
- Current team: Varea

Senior career*
Years	Team	Apps	(Gls)
2012–2014	SD Logroñés	53	(2)
2014–2015	MTK	6	(0)
2015–2016	SD Logroñés		
2017–2022	Náxara	64	(25)
2022	Izarra	11	(1)
2023–2024	Berceo	40	(12)
2024–	Varea	6	(0)
- * Club domestic league appearances and goals as of 13 October 2024

Sergio Fernández Tamayo (born 28 March 1991) is a Spanish professional footballer who plays for Spanish Tercera Federación club Varea as a forward.
