= Zsolt Pölöskei =

Hungarian footballer

Personal information
- Full name: Zsolt Pölöskei
- Date of birth: 19 February 1991 (age 35)
- Place of birth: Budapest, Hungary
- Height: 1.85 m (6 ft 1 in)
- Position: Midfielder

Youth career
- 2002–2010: MTK
- 2008–2010: → Liverpool (loan)

Senior career*
Years	Team	Apps	(Gls)
2010–2015	MTK	80	(15)
2015–2017	Videoton	20	(0)
2017–2019	Budapest Honvéd	14	(0)

International career^{‡}
2009	Hungary U-19	2	(0)
- * Club domestic league appearances and goals as of 18:57, 8 July 2019 (UTC) ‡ National team caps and goals as of 28 October 2009

Zsolt Pölöskei (born 19 February 1991) is a retired Hungarian football player.

== Career statistics ==
Appearances and goals by club, season and competition
Club	Season	League			Cup		League Cup		Europe		Total	
Club	Season	Division	Apps	Goals	Apps	Goals	Apps	Goals	Apps	Goals	Apps	Goals
MTK
MTK	2011–12	Nemzeti Bajnokság II	9	2	1	0	3	0	0	0	13	2
MTK	2012–13	Nemzeti Bajnokság I	15	2	0	0	5	0	0	0	20	2
MTK	2013–14	Nemzeti Bajnokság I	28	6	7	0	1	0	0	0	36	6
MTK	2014–15	Nemzeti Bajnokság I	28	5	3	3	4	0	0	0	22	6
MTK	Total		80	15	11	3	13	0	0	0	104	18
Videoton
Videoton	2015–16	Nemzeti Bajnokság I	20	0	4	0	—		0	0	24	0
Videoton	2016–17	Nemzeti Bajnokság I	0	0	2	1	0	0	0	0	2	1
Videoton	Total		20	0	6	1	0	0	0	0	26	1
Budapest Honvéd
Budapest Honvéd	2017–18	Nemzeti Bajnokság I	13	0	4	0	—		2	0	19	0
Budapest Honvéd	2018–19	Nemzeti Bajnokság I	1	0	0	0	—		1	0	2	0
Budapest Honvéd	Total		14	0	4	0	0	0	3	0	21	0
Career total			114	15	21	4	13	0	3	0	151	19

Updated to games played as of 26 July 2018.
