= Dunaújvárosi Stadion =

Coordinates: 46°57′21″N 18°56′50.70″E

Dunaújváros Stadion
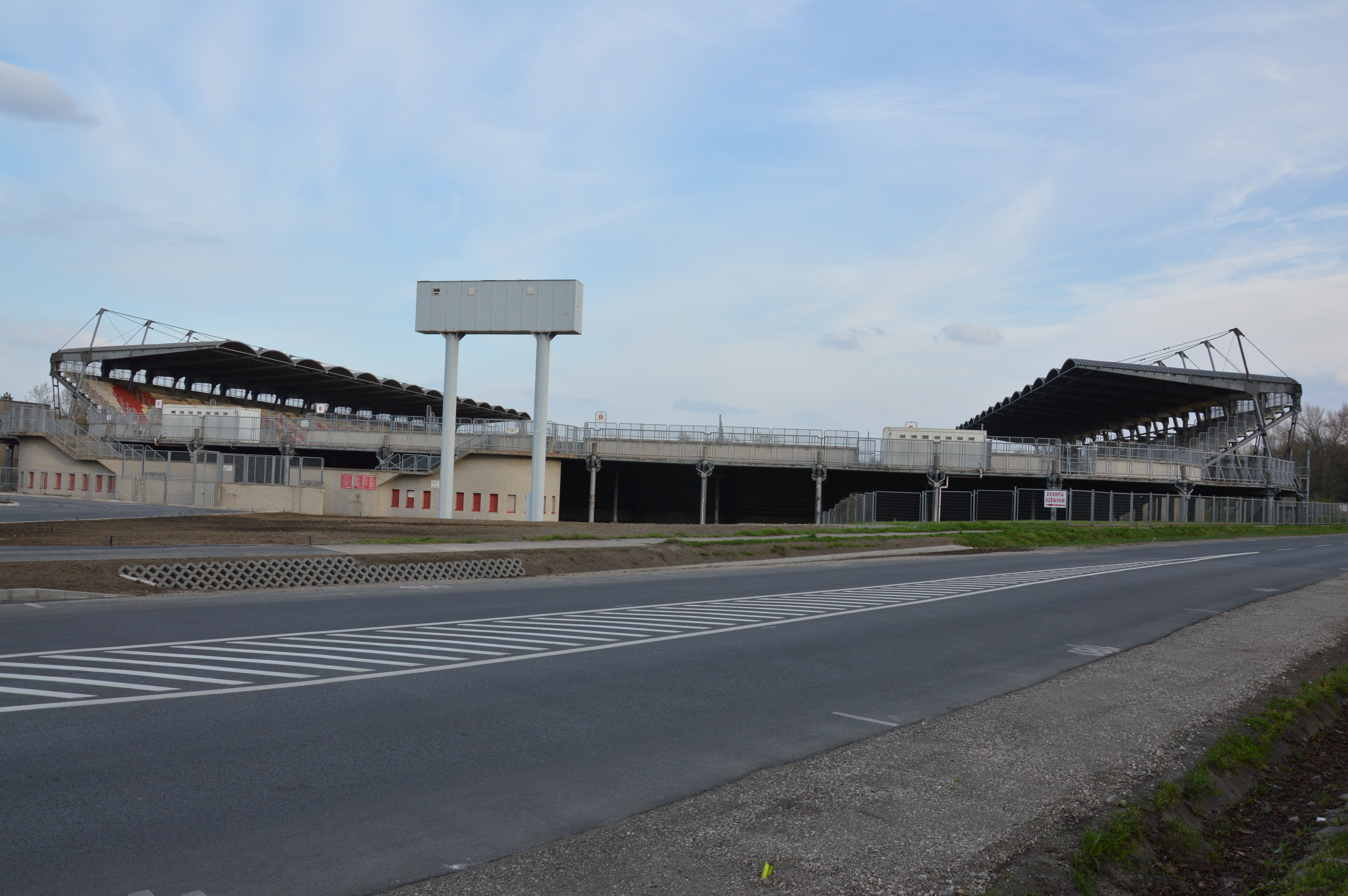
- Interior of the stadium
- Interactive map of Dunaújváros Stadion
- Full name: Dunaújváros Stadion
- Location: Dunaújváros, Hungary
- Owner: Dunaújváros Pálhalma
- Operator: Dunaújváros Pálhalma
- Capacity: 12,000
- Surface: Grass; Field
- Record attendance: (Hungary) Dunaújváros 2-2 (Hungary) Ferencváros (6,000 24 August 2002)
- Field size: 105 × 68 m (344 × 223 ft)

Construction
- Groundbreaking: 1951
- Built: 1951–52
- Opened: 1952
- Renovated: 2003; 2014

Tenants
- Dunaújváros (2002–2009); Dunaújváros Pálhalma (2002–); Dunakanyar-Vác FC (2016–); MTK Budapest FC (2016)

Dunaújvárosi Stadion also known as the Eszperantó úti Stadion is a multi-use stadium in Dunaújváros, Fejér, Hungary, with a capacity of 12,000. It is currently used mostly for football matches and is the home of football club Dunaújváros Pálhalma.

== History ==
On 23 March 2002, the stadium was inaugurated by the Dunaújváros-Debrecen in the 2001–02 season of the Hungarian League.

In 2009 the one-time Hungarian League champion, Dunaújváros FC dissolved.

== Milestone matches ==
23 March 2002

(Hungary) Dunaújváros	2–2	(Hungary) Debrecen
	(Report)

Opening match
