= Dunaújváros FC (1998) =

Hungarian football club

- Full name: Dunaújváros Futball Club
- Founded: 1998; 28 years ago
- Ground: Eszperantó úti Stadion; Dunaújváros
- Capacity: 12,000
- Chairman: György Vígh
- Manager: Tamás Artner
- League: NB III
- Website: dpase.hu
| Home colours | Away colours |

Dunaújváros Futball Club (previously known as Dunaújváros PASE) [ˈdunɒuːjvaːroʃ] is a Hungarian football club located in Dunaújváros, Hungary. It currently plays in the Hungarian National Championship. The team's colors are blue and yellow. The team name derives from sponsorship from local agricultural firm Pálhalmai Agrospeciál Kft.

== History ==
On 12 August 2026, the club was excluded from the 2026–27 Nemzeti Bajnokság III season since the club could not play their first three matches in the season.

== Honours ==
- Nemzeti Bajnokság III:
  - Winners (2): 2010–11, 2012–13

== Seasons ==
The table below shows the seasons of Dunaújváros.

| Season | Tier | Club's name | Position | Pts |
|---|---|---|---|---|
| 1998–99 | 7 | Pálhalma | 6 / 10 | 23 |
| 1999–00 | 7 | Pálhalma | 9 / 14 | 32 |
| 2000–01 | 7 | Pálhalma | 5 / 14 | 39 |
| 2001–02 | 7 | Pálhalma | 1 / 14 | 57 |
| 2002–03 | 6 | Pálhalma | 14 / 16 | 26 |
| 2003–04 | 6 | Pálhalma | 7 / 16 | 41 |
| 2004–05 | 6 | Pálhalma | 7 / 16 | 49 |
| 2005–06 | 5 | Pálhalma | 3 / 16 | 72 |
| 2006–07 | 5 | Pálhalma | 2 / 16 | 72 |
| 2007–08 | 5 | Pálhalma | 1 / 16 | 82 |
| 2008–09 | 4 | Pálhalma | 5 / 16 | 51 |
| 2009–10 | 4 | Dunaújváros-Pálhalmai Agrospeciál SE | 1 / 16 | 78 |
| 2010–11 | 3 | Dunaújváros-Pálhalmai Agrospeciál SE | 1 / 16 | 61 |
| 2011–12 | 2 | Dunaújváros Pálhalma Agrospeciál SE | 15 / 16 | 28 |
| 2012–13 | 3 | Dunaújváros Pálhalma Agrospeciál SE | 1 / 14 | 66 |
| 2013–14 | 2 | Dunaújváros Pálhalma Agrospeciál SE | 2 / 16 | 62 |
| 2014–15 | 1 | Dunaújváros PASE | 15 / 16 | 22 |
| 2015–16 | 2 | Dunaújváros Pálhalma Agrospeciál SE | 15 / 16 | 27 |
| 2016–17 | 3 | Dunaújváros Pálhalma Agrospeciál SE | 4 / 18 | 64 |
| 2017–18 | 3 | Dunaújváros Pálhalma Agrospeciál SE | 4 / 16 | 55 |
| 2018–19 | 3 | Dunaújváros PASE | 4 / 16 | 49 |
| 2019–20 | 3 | Dunaújváros PASE | 5 / 16 | 31 |
| 2020–21 | 3 | Dunaújváros PASE | 13 / 20 | 47 |
| 2021–22 | 3 | Dunaújváros PASE | 3 / 20 | 78 |
| 2022–23 | 3 | Dunaújváros FC | 8 / 20 | 51 |
| 2023–24 | 3 | Dunaújváros FC | 16 / 16 | 25 |
| 2024–25 | 4 | Dunaújváros FC | 1 / 14 | 71 |
| 2025–26 | 3 | Dunaújváros FC | 8 / 16 | 49 |
