= 2007–08 Kaposvári Rákóczi FC season =

Kaposvár
2007–08 season
- Manager: László Prukner
- Stadium: Rákóczi Stadion
- Nemzeti Bajnokság I: 6th
- Magyar Kupa: Semi-finals
- Ligakupa: Autumn season: Group Stage; Spring season: Group Stage

The 2007–08 season was Kaposvári Rákóczi Football Club's 9th competitive season, 4th consecutive season in the Nemzeti Bajnokság I and 84th year in existence as a football club. In addition to the domestic league, Kaposvár participated in this season's editions of the Magyar Kupa, and the Ligakupa.

== Squad ==
Note: Flags indicate national team as defined under FIFA eligibility rules; some limited exceptions apply. Players may hold more than one non-FIFA nationality.

No.	Pos.	Nation	Player
1	GK	HUN	Árpád Milinte
2	DF	HUN	Zsolt Radics
3	DF	HUN	Attila Pintér
6	DF	HUN	Róbert Kovácsevics
7	MF	HUN	Norbert Graszl
8	DF	HUN	István Ribi
9	FW	BRA	André Alves
11	MF	MNE	Bojan Božović
13	MF	SRB	Nemanja Nikolić
14	FW	SRB	Lóránt Oláh
16	FW	HUN	Gábor Reszli
17	DF	HUN	Viktor Petrók

No.	Pos.	Nation	Player
18	MF	HUN	László Balogh
19	MF	HUN	Krisztián Pest
20	MF	HUN	Zoltán Farkas
21	DF	HUN	Károly Graszl
22	MF	MNE	Srđan Tonković
24	MF	HUN	Dénes Szakály
25	MF	HUN	Béla Maróti
26	MF	HUN	Tamás Grúz
27	GK	HUN	László Horváth
28	DF	HUN	Krisztián Zahorecz
29	GK	HUN	Zoltán Kovács

== Competitions ==
=== Overview ===
Competition	First match	Last match	Starting round	Final position	Record							
Competition	First match	Last match	Starting round	Final position	Pld	W	D	L	GF	GA	GD	Win %
Nemzeti Bajnokság I	21 July 2007	1 June 2008	Matchday 1	6th	30	14	9	7	48	38	+10	46.67
Magyar Kupa	29 August 2007	9 April 2008	Third round	Semi-finals	8	5	1	2	22	13	+9	62.50
Ligakupa (Autumn season)	15 August 2007	10 October 2007	Group stage	Group Stage	6	0	2	4	6	16	−10	0.00
Ligakupa (Spring season)	1 December 2007	27 February 2008	Group stage	Group Stage	6	3	0	3	11	11	+0	50.00
Total					50	22	12	16	87	78	+9	44.00

Source: Competitions

=== Nemzeti Bajnokság I ===
==== League table ====
Pos	Team	Pld	W	D	L	GF	GA	GD	Pts	Qualification or relegation
4	Újpest	30	16	7	7	58	40	+18	55	
5	Fehérvár	30	17	3	10	48	32	+16	54	
6	Kaposvár	30	14	9	7	48	38	+10	51	
7	Zalaegerszeg	30	13	7	10	55	39	+16	46	
8	Honvéd	30	12	7	11	45	36	+9	43	Qualification for Intertoto Cup first round

Source: soccerway.com

==== Results summary ====
Overall								Home						Away					
Pld	W	D	L	GF	GA	GD	Pts	W	D	L	GF	GA	GD	W	D	L	GF	GA	GD
30	14	9	7	48	38	+10	51	7	5	3	22	20	+2	7	4	4	26	18	+8

Source: HFF

==== Matches ====
21 July 2007 1	Kaposvár	1–1	Sopron	Kaposvár
	P. Szakály 56'	Report	Sira 35'	Stadium: Rákóczi Stadion; Referee: Péter Solymosi

30 July 2007 2	Fehérvár	1–1	Kaposvár	Székesfehérvár
	Božić 44'	Report	Zahorecz 46'	Stadium: Sóstói Stadion; Referee: Tamás Bognár

4 August 2007 3	Kaposvár	2–1	Paks	Kaposvár
	Alves 9'; Zahorecz 88'	Report	Márkus 64'	Stadium: Rákóczi Stadion; Referee: József Berger

13 August 2007 4	Újpest	0–2	Kaposvár	Budapest
		Report	Oláh 56'; Vasiljević 70'	Stadium: Szusza Ferenc Stadion; Referee: Szabolcs Szilasi

18 August 2007 5	Kaposvár	1–1	Diósgyőr	Kaposvár
	Oláh 48'	Report	Simon 7'	Stadium: Rákóczi Stadion; Referee: Ferenc Bede

25 August 2007 6	Debrecen	4–0	Kaposvár	Debrecen
	Kerekes 47'; Kouemaha 48'; Sándor 68'; Leandro 73'	Report		Stadium: Oláh Gábor utcai Stadion; Referee: Gergely Sulyok

1 September 2007 7	Kaposvár	4–3	Siófok	Kaposvár
	Alves 1', 40'; Oláh 45'; Vasiljević 69'	Report	Kuttor 32'; Fülöp 48', 62'	Stadium: Rákóczi Stadion; Referee: Mihály Fábián

15 September 2007 8	Zalaegerszeg	2–1	Kaposvár	Zalaegerszeg
	Miljatovič (yellow card) 2'; Dudić (yellow card) 9'; Waltner 13', 32'; Polgár (yellow card) 19'; P. Máté I (yellow card) 51'	Report	Zahorecz 2', (red card) 86'; Maróti (yellow card) 41'	Stadium: ZTE Arena; Referee: István Vad

22 September 2007 9	Kaposvár	0–3	MTK	Kaposvár
		Report	Urbán 19'; Kanta 36'; Lambulić 52'	Stadium: Rákóczi Stadion; Referee: Sándor Andó-Szabó

29 September 2007 10	Kaposvár	1–1	Győr	Kaposvár
	Oláh 37'	Report	Jäkl 3'	Stadium: Rákóczi Stadion; Referee: Szabolcs Szilasi

6 October 2007 11	Honvéd	0–1	Kaposvár	Budapest
		Report	Oláh 86'	Stadium: Bozsik József Stadion; Referee: Roland Veizer

20 October 2007 12	Kaposvár	1–0	Vasas	Kaposvár
	Oláh 57'	Report		Stadium: Rákóczi Stadion; Referee: Ferenc Bede

3 November 2007 13	Nyíregyháza	0–2	Kaposvár	Nyíregyháza
		Report	Alves 30', 38'	Stadium: Városi Stadion; Referee: Gergely Sulyok

10 November 2007 14	Kaposvár	4–2	Tatabánya	Kaposvár
	Grúz 11'; Alves 29', 48'; Da Silva 74'	Report	Megyesi 19'; Takács 35'	Stadium: Rákóczi Stadion; Referee: Krisztián Pánczél

24 November 2007 15	Rákospalota	1–1	Kaposvár	Budapest
	G. Horváth (yellow card) 32'; Erős (yellow card) 35'; Torma 90'	Report	Da Silva 45'; Maróti (yellow card) 47'	Stadium: Budai II. László Stadion; Attendance: 1,000; Referee: Tamás Arany

23 February 2008 16	Sopron	0–3; Awarded	Kaposvár	Sopron
		Report		Stadium: Stadion Városi

1 March 2008 17	Kaposvár	1–0	Fehérvár	Kaposvár
	Nikolić 76'	Report		Stadium: Rákóczi Stadion; Referee: Gegely Sulyok

8 March 2008 18	Paks	1–1	Kaposvár	Siófok
	Tököli 72'	Report	Alves 80'	Stadium: Révész Géza utcai Stadion; Referee: István Vad

14 March 2008 19	Kaposvár	0–3	Újpest	Kaposvár
		Report	Tisza 47', 90+3'; Hajdú 83'	Stadium: Rákóczi Stadion; Referee: István Mészáros

22 March 2008 20	Diósgyőr	2–1	Kaposvár	Miskolc
	Sebők 66'; Cardozo 83'	Report	Da Silva 11'	Stadium: Diósgyőri Stadion; Referee: Roland Veizer

30 March 2008 21	Kaposvár	2–2	Debrecen	Kaposvár
	Szakály 23'; Oláh 63'	Report	Leandro 72'; Bíró 90+3'	Stadium: Rákóczi Stadion; Referee: Sándor Andó-Szabó

5 April 2008 22	Siófok	0–2	Kaposvár	Siófok
		Report	Oláh 41'; Grúz 86'	Stadium: Révész Géza utcai Stadion; Referee: Ádám Németh

14 April 2008 23	Kaposvár	0–2	Zalaegerszeg	Kaposvár
	A. Pintér (yellow card) 38'; Petrók (yellow card) 65'; Grúz (yellow card) 74'	Report	Méyé 5', (yellow card) 45'; Zatara (yellow card) 58'; Waltner 65'; P. Máté I (yellow card) 84'	Stadium: Rákóczi Stadion; Referee: Tamás Bognár

18 April 2008 24	MTK	3–2	Kaposvár	Budapest
	Urbán 4'; Lambulić 15'; Szabó 51'	Report	Obrić 75'; Nikolić 86'	Stadium: Hidegkuti Nándor Stadion; Referee: István Mészáros

26 April 2008 25	Győr	1–1	Kaposvár	Győr
	Brnović 48'	Report	Oláh 78'	Stadium: ETO Park; Referee: Mihály Fábián

5 May 2008 26	Kaposvár	1–0	Honvéd	Kaposvár
	Oláh 43'	Report		Stadium: Rákóczi Stadion; Referee: Zsolt Szabó

10 May 2008 27	Vasas	1–2	Kaposvár	Budapest
	Lázok 33'	Report	Alves 17'; Oláh 67'	Stadium: Illovszky Rudolf Stadion; Referee: Ádám Németh

17 May 2008 28	Kaposvár	1–1	Nyíregyháza	Kaposvár
	Alves 43'	Report	Miskolczi 70'	Stadium: Rákóczi Stadion; Referee: Viktor Kassai

25 May 2008 29	Tatabánya	2–6	Kaposvár	Budapest
	Vámosi (yellow card) 57'; Németh 69'; Almási (yellow card) 81'; Ferenczi 85'	Report	Alves 15'; Zahorecz (yellow card) 37'; Oláh 38', 46', 83'; Maróti (yellow card) 47'; Da Silva 56'; Nikolić 90+1'	Stadium: Szőnyi úti Stadion; Referee: Krisztián Pánczél

1 June 2008 30	Kaposvár	3–0	Rákospalota	Kaposvár
	Oláh 49', 58'; Nikolić 88'	Report	Kapcsos (yellow card) 80'	Stadium: Rákóczi Stadion; Attendance: 2,500; Referee: István Mészáros

=== Magyar Kupa ===
29 August 2007 Third round	Komló	1–3	Kaposvár	Komló
	G. Gelencsér 73'	Report	Alves 53'; Grúz 59'; Z. Farkas 90'	Stadium: Bányász Stadion; Referee: Gábor Péter Kovács

26 September 2007 Round of 32	Pénzügyőr	1–7	Kaposvár	Budapest
	G. Patkó 80'	Report	Oláh 21', 28', 60'; Vasiljević 23'; Alves 27', 55'; Božović 72'	Stadium: Pasaréti út Referee: Ádám Németh

==== Round of 16 ====
24 October 2007 First leg	Ferencváros	2–2	Kaposvár	Budapest
	Bartha 14'; Dragóner (yellow card) 27', (goal) 62'; Deme (yellow card) 42'	Report	Alves 39'; Zahorecz 45', (red card) 45'; Vasiljević (yellow card) 61'	Stadium: Üllői úti Stadion; Referee: Péter Solymosi

7 November 2007 Second leg	Kaposvár	2–1 (4–3 agg.)	Ferencváros	Kaposvár
	Oláh 30', 38'; Maróti (yellow card) 73'	Report	Mátyus (yellow card) 36'; Maróti (yellow card) 43'; Fitos 48'; Dragóner (red card) 90'	Stadium: Rákóczi Stadion; Referee: Tamás Arany
Note: Kaposvár won 4–3 on aggregate.

==== Quarter-finals ====
19 March 2008 First leg	Gyirmót	2–4	Kaposvár	Győr
19:00 CET (UTC+1)	G. Varga 7'; Oross 17'	Report	Pintér 40'; Grúz 53'; Oláh 67'; Nikolić 69'	Stadium: Ménfői úti Stadion; Referee: Zsolt Szabó

25 March 2008 Second leg	Kaposvár	3–0 (7–2 agg.)	Gyirmót	Kaposvár
18:00 CET (UTC+1)	Szakály 44'; Zahorecz 48'; Alves 55'	Report		Stadium: Rákóczi Stadion; Referee: Gyöngyi Gaál
Note: Kaposvár won 7–2 on aggregate.

==== Semi-finals ====
1 April 2008 First leg	Honvéd	4–0	Kaposvár	Budapest
	Dobos 19'; Hercegfalvi 54', 89'; Bárányos 67'	Report		Stadium: Bozsik József Stadion; Referee: Zoltán Iványi

9 April 2008 Second leg	Kaposvár	1–2 (1–6 agg.)	Honvéd	Kaposvár
	Pomper 83' (o.g.)	Report	Smiljanić 35'; Genito 44'	Stadium: Rákóczi Stadion; Referee: Szabolcs Szilasi
Note: Honvéd won 6–1 on aggregate.

=== Ligakupa ===
==== Autumn season ====
===== Group stage =====
Pos	Team	Pld	W	D	L	GF	GA	GD	Pts	Qualification	ZAL	RAK	SIO	KAP
1	Zalaegerszeg	6	5	1	0	18	7	+11	16	Advance to knockout phase	—	3–1	4–0	1–1
2	Rákospalota	6	2	2	2	14	12	+2	8	Advance to knockout phase	3–5	—	2–0	5–1
3	Siófok	6	2	1	3	9	12	−3	7		2–3	1–1	—	4–1
4	Kaposvár	6	0	2	4	6	16	−10	2		0–2	2–2	1–2	—

Source: HFF

15 August 2007 1	Kaposvár	0–2	Zalaegerszeg	Kaposvár
19:00 CEST (UTC+2)	Graszl (yellow card) 46'	Report	Lukács 29'; Kottán (yellow card) 70'; T. Molnár 73'	Stadium: Stadion Rákóczi; Attendance: 1,000; Referee: Tamás Bognár

22 August 2007 2	Rákospalota	5–1	Kaposvár	Budapest
16:00 CEST (UTC+2)	Délczeg 10'; F. Matondo (yellow card) 26'; Dinka 29'; Kőhalmi 31'; Rása (red card) 44'; T. Kiss 55'; G. Horváth 76'	Report	Suljic 22'; S. Tonković (yellow card) 29'; Milinte (yellow card) 31'; Mező (red card) 75'	Stadium: Budai II. László Stadion; Attendance: 500; Referee: Krisztián Pánczél

9 September 2007 3	Kaposvár	1–2	Siófok	Kaposvár
19:00 CEST (UTC+2)	Balogh 79'	Report	Lipcsei 16'; Z. Fülöp 73'	Stadium: Rákóczi Stadion; Referee: Szabolcs Szilasi

19 September 2007 4	Siófok	4–1	Kaposvár	Siófok
16:30 CEST (UTC+2)	Z. Fülöp 16'; Homonyik 28'; S. Kanta 55'; László 70'	Report	Reszli 40'	Stadium: Révész Géza utcai Stadion; Referee: Csaba Pintér

3 October 2007 5	Zalaegerszeg	1–1	Kaposvár	Zalaegerszeg
18:00 CEST (UTC+2)	Lukács 81'; Botiș (yellow card) 87'	Report	Graszl (yellow card) 12'; Tonkovic (yellow card) 66'; Suljic 77'; Szakály (red card) 90+2'	Stadium: ZTE Arena; Attendance: 800; Referee: Krisztián Király

10 October 2007 6	Kaposvár	2–2	Rákospalota	Kaposvár
18:00 CEST (UTC+2)	Da Silva (yellow card) 39'; Z. Farkas 43'; Reszli 64'; R. Horváth (yellow card) 66'	Report	F. Matondo 19'; Pusztai (yellow card) 42'; T. Kiss 70'; B. Kovács (yellow card) 73'	Stadium: Rákóczi Stadion; Attendance: 200; Referee: Tamás Bognár

==== Spring season ====
===== Group stage =====
Pos	Team	Pld	W	D	L	GF	GA	GD	Pts	Qualification	PAK	SIO	KAP	FEH
1	Paks	6	5	0	1	16	10	+6	15	Advance to knockout phase	—	3–0	2–1	3–1
2	Siófok	6	3	0	3	15	13	+2	9	Advance to knockout phase	4–2	—	1–2	4–2
3	Kaposvár	6	3	0	3	11	11	0	9		4–5	2–1	—	2–0
4	Fehérvár	6	1	0	5	7	15	−8	3		0–1	2–5	2–0	—

Source: HFF

1 December 2007 1	Siófok	1–2	Kaposvár	Kaposvár
13:00 CET (UTC+1)	Forgács 40'	Report	da Silva 48'; Szakály 60'	Stadium: Cseri úti Sporttelep; Referee: Tamás Bognár

5 December 2007 2	Kaposvár	4–5	Paks	Kaposvár
13:00 CET (UTC+1)	Grúz 43'; Alves 47'; Božović 55', 90+2'	Report	Éger 7'; Salamon 41'; Böde 62'; T. Kiss 69'; Vári 90'	Stadium: Rákóczi Stadion; Referee: Krisztián Király

8 December 2007 3	Kaposvár	2–0	Fehérvár	Kaposvár
13:00 CET (UTC+1)	Božović 44', 56'	Report		Stadium: Cseri úti Sporttelep; Referee: Gábor Oláh

16 February 2008 4	Fehérvár	2–0	Kaposvár	Székesfehérvár
14:00 CET (UTC+1)	Simek 19'; Farkas 62'	Report		Stadium: Sóstói Stadion; Referee: Szabolcs Szilasi

20 February 2008 5	Kaposvár	2–1	Siófok	Kaposvár
14:00 CET (UTC+1)	Nikolić 29', 38'	Report	Forgács 89'	Stadium: Rákóczi Stadion; Referee: Ádám Németh

27 February 2008 6	Paks	2–1	Kaposvár	Paks
14:00 CET (UTC+1)	Báló 25', 27'	Report	Božović 61' (pen.)	Stadium: Fehérvári úti Stadion; Referee: Krisztián Király
