= 2008–09 Kaposvári Rákóczi FC season =

Kaposvár
2008–09 season
- Owner: FC ownership share (66.7%); Private individuals (33.3%)
- Manager: László Prukner
- Stadium: Rákóczi Stadion (Home stadium); Cseri út (Note: The match against Dunaújváros and Paks in the Ligakupa were played at the Cseri út in Kaposvár, instead of Kaposvár regular stadium, the Rákóczi Stadion.) (Temporary stadium)
- Nemzeti Bajnokság I: 9th
- Magyar Kupa: Round of 16
- Ligakupa: Group stage
- Top goalscorer: League: Nemanja Nikolić (16); All: Nemanja Nikolić (24)
- Highest home attendance: 3,500 (multiple Nemzeti Bajnokság I matches)
- Lowest home attendance: 100 (multiple Ligakupa matches)
- Average home league attendance: 2,513
- Biggest win: 6–0 v Gránit Gyógyfürdő (Away, 24 September 2008, Magyar Kupa)
- Biggest defeat: 1–6 v MTK (Away, 21 October 2008, Nemzeti Bajnokság I)

The 2008–09 season was Kaposvári Rákóczi Football Club's 10th competitive season, 5th consecutive season in the Nemzeti Bajnokság I and 85th season in existence as a football club. In addition to the domestic league, Kaposvár participated in that season's editions of the Magyar Kupa and the Ligakupa.

== Squad ==
Squad at end of season

Note: Flags indicate national team as defined under FIFA eligibility rules; some limited exceptions apply. Players may hold more than one non-FIFA nationality.

No.	Pos.	Nation	Player
1	GK	HUN	László Horváth
2	FW	HUN	Zoltán Jovánczai
3	DF	HUN	László Pintér
4	DF	BIH	Boris Gujić
6	DF	HUN	Ádám Major
7	MF	SRB	Nemanja Obrić
8	MF	HUN	Krisztián Keczeli
9	FW	HUN	Krisztián Farkas
10	FW	SRB	Nemanja Nikolić
11	FW	MNE	Bojan Božović
13	FW	BRA	Aílton Júnior
14	FW	HUN	Milán Németh
15	FW	HUN	Róbert Zsolnai

No.	Pos.	Nation	Player
16	FW	HUN	Gábor Reszli
17	DF	HUN	Viktor Petrók
18	MF	HUN	Benjamin Balázs
19	MF	HUN	Krisztián Pest
20	MF	HUN	Zoltán Farkas
21	DF	HUN	Károly Graszl
22	DF	HUN	Szabolcs Szeles
23	GK	HUN	Tamás Horváth
24	MF	HUN	Dávid Hegedűs
25	DF	HUN	Gábor Bogdán
26	DF	HUN	Tamás Grúz
28	DF	HUN	Krisztián Zahorecz
29	GK	HUN	Zoltán Kovács

== Competitions ==
=== Overview ===
Competition	First match	Last match	Starting round	Final position	Record							
Competition	First match	Last match	Starting round	Final position	Pld	W	D	L	GF	GA	GD	Win %
Nemzeti Bajnokság I	25 July 2008	30 May 2009	Matchday 1	9th	30	11	7	12	51	46	+5	36.67
Magyar Kupa	3 September 2008	21 October 2008	Third round	Round of 16	4	2	0	2	10	10	+0	50.00
Ligakupa	1 October 2008	14 February 2009	Group stage	Group stage	10	6	1	3	26	20	+6	60.00
Total					44	19	8	17	87	76	+11	43.18

Source: Competitions

=== Nemzeti Bajnokság I ===
==== League table ====
Pos	Team	Pld	W	D	L	GF	GA	GD	Pts
7	MTK Budapest	30	13	6	11	43	41	+2	45
8	Győr	30	11	10	9	57	41	+16	43
9	Kaposvár	30	11	7	12	51	46	+5	40
10	Vasas	30	11	5	14	42	52	−10	38
11	Paks	30	9	8	13	38	51	−13	35

Source: soccerway.com
Rules for classification: 1st points; 2nd overall wins; 3rd goal difference; 4th goals scored

==== Results summary ====
Overall								Home						Away					
Pld	W	D	L	GF	GA	GD	Pts	W	D	L	GF	GA	GD	W	D	L	GF	GA	GD
30	11	7	12	51	46	+5	40	8	1	6	28	20	+8	3	6	6	23	26	−3

Source: Hungarian Football Federation

==== Results by round ====
Round	1	2	3	4	5	6	7	8	9	10	11	12	13	14	15	16	17	18	19	20	21	22	23	24	25	26	27	28	29	30
Ground	H	A	H	A	H	A	H	A	H	A	H	A	H	H	A	A	H	A	H	A	H	A	H	A	H	A	H	A	A	H
Result	W	L	L	D	L	D	W	L	W	D	L	W	W	W	L	L	W	D	L	D	D	W	L	W	L	L	W	D	L	W
Position	1	5	11	11	14	13	12	12	11	10	11	10	8	6	7	11	8	7	8	9	10	7	10	8	9	10	9	9	10	9
Points	3	3	3	4	4	5	8	8	11	12	12	15	18	21	21	21	24	25	25	26	27	30	30	33	33	33	36	37	37	40

Source: Matches
A = Away; H = Home; W = Win; D = Draw; L = Loss

==== Matches ====
25 July 2008 1	Kaposvár	3–1	MTK	Kaposvár
19:00 CEST (UTC+2)	Zahorecz 31' (pen.), 35' (pen.); Božović 41', (yellow card) 58'	Report	Hrepka (yellow card) 64'; Bori 85'; Pollák (yellow card) 87'; Le. Horváth (yellow card) 90+3'	Stadium: Rákóczi Stadion; Attendance: 3,000; Referee: Zsolt Szabó; Assistant referees: Róbert Kispál, Zsolt Márton; Fourth official: Tibor Gyarmati II

2 August 2008 2	Diósgyőr	1–0	Kaposvár	Miskolc
20:00 CEST (UTC+2)	Honma 18'; Mi. Tóth (yellow card) 77'; Kamber (yellow card) 82'	Report	Graszl (yellow card) 18'; Grúz (yellow card) 31'; Obrić (yellow card) 67'	Stadium: Diósgyőri Stadion; Attendance: 4,500; Referee: József Berger; Assistant referees: Attila Forgács, Gábor Kormányos II; Fourth official: Gábor Fajkusz

9 August 2008 3	Kaposvár	3–5	Paks	Kaposvár
20:00 CEST (UTC+2)	Graszl (yellow card) 18'; Zahorecz 30' (pen.), 51' (pen.); K. Farkas 75'	Report	Báló 7', 15', (yellow card) 45'; T. Kiss I 32'; Tököli 41'; Salamon (yellow card) 50'; Csehi 76'	Stadium: Rákóczi Stadion; Attendance: 2,500; Referee: Sándor Andó-Szabó; Assistant referees: Balázs Farkas, Zsolt Butkai; Fourth official: Csaba Molnár

16 August 2008 4	Zalaegerszeg	1–1	Kaposvár	Zalaegerszeg
20:00 CEST (UTC+2)	Waltner (yellow card) 51'; Petrók 71' (o.g.); Botiș (yellow card) 76'; Z. Tóth I (yellow card) 83'	Report	Božović 78'	Stadium: ZTE Arena; Attendance: 4,000; Referee: István Mészáros; Assistant referees: László Viszokai, István Iványi; Fourth official: Miklós Tuczai

23 August 2008 5	Kaposvár	0–1	Győr	Kaposvár
20:00 CEST (UTC+2)	Bogdán (yellow card) 61'	Report	Bajzát 76'; Pákolicz (red card) 84'	Stadium: Rákóczi Stadion; Attendance: 2,000; Referee: Ádám Németh; Assistant referees: Zsolt Márton, Attila Beidek; Fourth official: Attila Éreth

30 August 2023 6	Fehérvár	1–1	Kaposvár	Székesfehérvár
20:00 CEST (UTC+2)	Pavličić 31'; Romero (yellow card) 49'; Mohl (yellow card) 66'; D. Nagy (yellow card) 72'	Report	Bogdán 2'; K. Farkas (yellow card) 23'	Stadium: Sóstói Stadion; Attendance: 1,976; Referee: Szabolcs Szilasi; Assistant referees: Oszkár Lémon, Gyula Fehér; Fourth official: Dávid Ákos

13 September 2008 7	Kaposvár	1–0	Nyíregyháza	Kaposvár
20:00 CEST (UTC+2)	Zahorecz 19', (yellow card) 35'; Z. Farkas (yellow card) 46'; Obrić (yellow card) 77'; Grúz (red card) 84'	Report	Lippai (yellow card) 39'; Ramos (yellow card) 50'; Cornaci (red card) 71'; Miskolczi (yellow card) 77'; Mboussi (red card) 90+4'	Stadium: Rákóczi Stadion; Attendance: 2,500; Referee: Krisztián Király; Assistant referees: László Viszokai, Zoltán Kis; Fourth official: Balázs Lak

21 September 2008 8	Újpest	3–2	Kaposvár	Budapest
20:00 CEST (UTC+2)	Mijadinoski 6', (yellow card) 52'; Ćutuk 25'; Rajczi 64'	Report	Bogdán (yellow card) 16'; Graszl (yellow card) 19'; Pest (yellow card) 41'; Nem. Nikolić 60'; Zahorecz 83', (yellow card) 90'	Stadium: Szusza Ferenc Stadion; Attendance: 4,813; Referee: József Berger; Assistant referees: Attila Forgács, István Tóth; Fourth official: János Kőrösi

27 September 2008 9	Kaposvár	1–0	Siófok	Kaposvár
19:00 CEST (UTC+2)	Božović 82'	Report		Stadium: Rákóczi Stadion; Attendance: 2,500; Referee: Ferenc Bede; Assistant referees: Attila Beidek, István Iványi; Fourth official: Gábor Oláh

4 October 2008 10	Haladás	1–1	Kaposvár	Szombathely
18:00 CEST (UTC+2)	Oross 27'; P. Tóth I (yellow card) 86'; N. Tóth (yellow card) 90+3'	Report	Grúz (yellow card) 50'; Kovácsevics (yellow card) 55'; Zahorecz (yellow card) 63', (goal) 86' (pen.)	Stadium: Rohonci út Attendance: 6,500; Referee: Sándor Andó-Szabó; Assistant referees: Oszkár Lémon, Gábor Takács; Fourth official: Gábor Oláh

18 October 2008 11	Kaposvár	0–1	Debrecen	Kaposvár
18:00 CEST (UTC+2)	Grúz (yellow card) 21'; Božović (yellow card) 45'	Report	Rudolf 30'; Z. Kiss I (yellow card) 59'; Dombi (yellow card) 81'	Stadium: Rákóczi Stadion; Attendance: 3,500; Referee: István Vad; Assistant referees: Vencel Tóth II, Zoltán Kovács; Fourth official: Norbert Kiss

25 October 2008 12	Kecskemét	3–4	Kaposvár	Kecskemét
18:00 CEST (UTC+2)	Csordás 5'; Schindler (red card) 17'; Montvai (yellow card) 31', (goal) 31'; Alempijević 65'; Čukić (yellow card) 84'	Report	Nem. Nikolić 29', 62'; Zahorecz (yellow card) 43'; Obrić 46'; Božović 71'; Gujić (yellow card) 75'; Pest (yellow card) 84'	Stadium: Széktói Stadion; Attendance: 4,000; Referee: Viktor Kassai; Assistant referees: Gábor Erős, Tibor Vámos; Fourth official: Péter Tamási

1 November 2008 13	Kaposvár	4–1	Rákospalota	Kaposvár
18:00 CET (UTC+1)	Božović 15'; Zahorecz 43'; Nem. Nikolić 46'; Gujić (yellow card) 75'; Bogdán 88'	Report	Torma 62'; Rása (yellow card) 73'; Dancs (yellow card) 78'; Lisztes (yellow card) 78'	Stadium: Rákóczi Stadion; Attendance: 2,200; Referee: Tamás Arany; Assistant referees: Balázs Farkas, István Iványi; Fourth official: Gergő Király

8 November 2008 14	Kaposvár	4–0	Vasas	Kaposvár
18:00 CET (UTC+1)	Grúz 13'; Kovácsevics (yellow card) 18'; Zahorecz (yellow card) 38'; Nem. Nikolić 45', 67'; Obrić (yellow card) 84'; Reszli 90'	Report	Divić (yellow card) 33'; Sowunmi (yellow card) 42'; Pavičević (yellow card) 61'; A. Tóth (yellow card) 81'; Gyánó (yellow card) 84'	Stadium: Rákóczi Stadion; Attendance: 3,500; Referee: István Vad; Assistant referees: Zsolt Butkai, Zoltán Szalai; Fourth official: Csaba Molnár

15 November 2008 15	Honvéd	2–1	Kaposvár	Budapest
18:00 CET (UTC+1)	Hercegfalvi 36'; Rigonato 38'	Report	Petrók (yellow card) 36'; Pest (yellow card) 42'; Nem. Nikolić 90+3' (pen.)	Stadium: Bozsik József Stadion; Attendance: 1,000; Referee: István Mészáros; Assistant referees: Róbert Kispál, György Ring; Fourth official: Balázs Lak

21 February 2009 16	MTK	2–1	Kaposvár	Budapest
17:00 CET (UTC+1)	Gosztonyi (yellow card) 23'; Hrepka 51'; J. Kanta 59'; Lambulić (yellow card) 65'	Report	Zahorecz 66' (pen.); Grúz (yellow card) 90'	Stadium: Hidegkuti Nándor Stadion; Attendance: 700; Referee: Ádám Farkas; Assistant referees: Attila Kelemen, Gyula Fehér; Fourth official: László Varga

7 March 2009 18	Paks	0–0	Kaposvár	Paks
18:00 CET (UTC+1)	Zováth (yellow card) 36'	Report	Petrók (yellow card) 44'; D. Hegedűs (yellow card) 60'; Zo. Kovács I (yellow card) 84'	Stadium: Fehérvári úti Stadion; Attendance: 800; Referee: János Takács; Assistant referees: Lajos L. Tóth, István Iványi; Fourth official: Gábor Bendik

16 March 2009 19	Kaposvár	1–2	Zalaegerszeg	Kaposvár
19:00 CET (UTC+1)	Petrók (yellow card) 33'; Miljatovič 57' (o.g.); Pest (yellow card) 67'	Report	Waltner 26', (yellow card) 67'; An. Horváth I (yellow card) 44'; Kocsárdi 48'; Miljatovič (yellow card) 86'	Stadium: Rákóczi Stadion; Attendance: 1,500; Referee: Szabolcs Szilasi; Assistant referees: Gábor Erős, Dr. Péter Kovács; Fourth official: Dániel Becséri

21 March 2009 20	Győr	1–1	Kaposvár	Győr
18:00 CET (UTC+1)	Bajzát 14'; Stanišić (yellow card) 78'; Völgyi (yellow card) 85'	Report	Gujić (yellow card) 7'; Petrók (yellow card) 51'; Zsolnai 76'; Pest (yellow card) 78'	Stadium: ETO Park; Attendance: 2,000; Referee: Ádám Németh; Assistant referees: Zsolt Butkai, Zoltán Szalai; Fourth official: Gergely Szőts

4 April 2009 21	Kaposvár	1–1	Fehérvár	Kaposvár
19:00 CEST (UTC+2)	Obrić (yellow card) 31', (goal) 31'; Petrók (yellow card) 45'; Z. Kovács I (yellow card) 46'; Zahorecz (red card) 86'	Report	G. Horváth II (yellow card) 39'; B. Farkas 47' (pen.); D. Nagy (yellow card) 57'; Elek (yellow card) 62'; Koller (yellow card) 90+3'	Stadium: Rákóczi Stadion; Attendance: 3,000; Referee: Gergely Sulyok; Assistant referees: Róbert Kispál, István Iványi; Fourth official: József Erdős

11 April 2009 22	Nyíregyháza	0–1	Kaposvár	Nyíregyháza
19:00 CEST (UTC+2)	T. Hegedűs (yellow card) 37'; Ramos (yellow card) 87'	Report	Nem. Nikolić 27'; Bogdán (yellow card) 31'; Zsolnai (yellow card) 67'	Stadium: Városi Stadion; Attendance: 2,000; Referee: István Vad; Assistant referees: Dr. Zsolt Varga, János Demeter; Fourth official: Gergő Janitz

18 April 2009 23	Kaposvár	2–3	Újpest	Kaposvár
15:00 CEST (UTC+2)	Zsolnai 4'; Zahorecz 32'; D. Hegedűs (yellow card) 33'; Gujić (yellow card) 52'; Zo. Kovács I (yellow card) 54'	Report	Stokes (yellow card) 27'; Kabát (yellow card) 29'; Božić (yellow card) 30'; Pollák 44'; Tisza (yellow card) 54', (goal) 84'; Rajczi 70'	Stadium: Rákóczi Stadion; Attendance: 3,500; Referee: Viktor Kassai; Assistant referees: Gábor Erős, Zoltán Szalai; Fourth official: Gábor Péter Kovács

25 April 2009 24	Siófok	2–5	Kaposvár	Siófok
19:00 CEST (UTC+2)	Tusori (yellow card) 35'; Ribeiro (yellow card) 45', (goal) 75'; Magasföldi 54', (yellow card) 66'; G. Horváth I (red card) 76'	Report	Zsolnai 6', 28', 58'; Zahorecz (yellow card) 11'; Bogdán (yellow card) 50'; Nem. Nikolić 56', 90+2'; Petrók (yellow card) 63'; Grúz (yellow card) 84'	Stadium: Révész Géza utcai Stadion; Attendance: 1,200; Referee: Zoltán Iványi; Assistant referees: Vencel Tóth II, Zsolt Márton

28 April 2009 25	Kaposvár	2–3	Haladás	Kaposvár
19:00 CEST (UTC+2)	Nem. Nikolić (yellow card) 52', (goal) 56'; Pest (yellow card) 65'; Zahorecz 71'	Report	Schimmer (yellow card) 32'; Rajos (yellow card) 34'; N. Sipos (yellow card) 54'; Kenesei 60', 65'; Iszlai (yellow card) 71'; Oross 88'	Stadium: Rákóczi Stadion; Attendance: 2,000; Referee: Roland Veizer; Assistant referees: Péter Berettyán, Róbert Horváth; Fourth official: László Varga

1 May 2009 26	Debrecen	4–1	Kaposvár	Debrecen
19:00 CEST (UTC+2)	Czvitkovics 17'; N. Mészáros 22'; P. Szakály 30'; Rudolf 70'	Report	Zsolnai 75'	Stadium: Oláh Gábor utcai Stadion; Attendance: 4,000; Referee: Tamás Arany; Assistant referees: László Viszokai, János Medovarszki; Fourth official: Krisztián Pánczél

6 May 2009 17	Kaposvár	1–0	Diósgyőr	Kaposvár
19:00 CEST (UTC+2)	Z. Farkas (yellow card) 27'; Nem. Nikolić 44'; Aílton (yellow card) 80'	Report	B. Lakatos (yellow card) 38'; Bogunović (yellow card) 55'; Miličić (red card) 90'; Szélpál (yellow card) 90'	Stadium: Rákóczi Stadion; Attendance: 1,800; Referee: Ádám Németh; Assistant referees: György Ring, Balázs Farkas; Fourth official: Gergő Janitz
Note: The matches of the 17th round were postponed due to HFF decision.

9 May 2009 27	Kaposvár	2–1	Kecskemét	Kaposvár
19:00 CEST (UTC+2)	Petrók (yellow card) 30', (goal) 32'; Zsolnai 89'	Report	Némedi 22' (pen.); Ristić (yellow card) 37'	Stadium: Stadion Rákóczi; Attendance: 2,000; Referee: Szabolcs Szilasi; Assistant referees: Balázs Huszár, Zoltán Kis; Fourth official: Csaba Pintér

16 May 2009 28	Rákospalota	3–3	Kaposvár	Budapest
19:00 CEST (UTC+2)	Torma 29'; Zo. Kovács II (yellow card) 32'; Dancs 60', (yellow card) 66'; Kapcsos 63'	Report	Nem. Nikolić 14', (yellow card) 66'; Zsolnai 20'; Petrók 57'; Grúz (yellow card) 64'	Stadium: Budai II. László Stadion; Attendance: 500; Referee: Viktor Kassai; Assistant referees: Gábor Erős, Tibor Vámos; Fourth official: Gyöngyi Gaál

23 May 2009 29	Vasas	2–1	Kaposvár	Budapest
19:00 CEST (UTC+2)	Somorjai 38' (pen.), (yellow card) 55'; Laczkó (yellow card) 60'; Beliczky 84'	Report	Petrók (yellow card) 10'; Nem. Nikolić 27'; Obrić (yellow card) 37'; Grúz (yellow card) 57'	Stadium: Illovszky Rudolf Stadion; Attendance: 1,000; Referee: Roland Veizer; Assistant referees: Péter Berettyán, Róbert Horváth; Fourth official: HJózsef Erdős

30 May 2009 30	Kaposvár	3–1	Honvéd	Kaposvár
19:00 CEST (UTC+2)	Kovácsevics 11'; Nem. Nikolić 23', 83'	Report	Moreira 79'	Stadium: Rákóczi Stadion; Attendance: 2,200; Referee: Tamás Bognár; Assistant referees: Gábor Takács, István Iványi; Fourth official: Krisztián Király

=== Magyar Kupa ===
3 September 2008 Third round	Andráshida	0–1	Kaposvár	Zalaegerszeg
15:30 CEST (UTC+2)	Z. Németh (red card) 84'	Report	Zahorecz 84' (pen.)	Stadium: Andráshidai Sportpálya; Attendance: 150; Referee: Dávid Ákos; Assistant referees: Milán Mohos, Mihály Szepesi

24 September 2008 Round of 32	Gránit Gyógyfürdő	0–6	Kaposvár	Zalakaros
15:30 CEST (UTC+2)	Hajmási (yellow card) 80'	Report	Nem. Nikolić 37', (yellow card) 88'; Obrić 64', 72', 85'; Grúz 75'; Ato 86'	Stadium: Zalakarosi Sportpálya; Attendance: 700; Referee: Csaba Pintér; Assistant referees: Zoltán Kovács, Balázs Huszár

==== Round of 16 ====
8 October 2008 First leg	Kaposvár	2–4	MTK	Kaposvár
17:00 CEST (UTC+2)	Zahorecz (yellow card) 20'; Božović 24'; Petrók 33', (yellow card) 52'; Gujić (yellow card) 34'	Report	G. Nagy (yellow card) 14'; Hrepka (yellow card) 31', (goal) 43', 50', 59'; Gosztonyi 61'	Stadium: Rákóczi Stadion; Attendance: 1,500; Referee: József Berger; Assistant referees: Attila Forgács, Zoltán Kis

21 October 2008 Second leg	MTK	6–1 (10–3 agg.)	Kaposvár	Budapest
17:00 CEST (UTC+2)	Kecskés 21'; Hrepka 53', 89'; G. Nagy 64', 85'; Lencse 88'	Report	Božović 83'	Stadium: Hidegkuti Nándor Stadion; Attendance: 150; Referee: Gábor Péter Kovács; Assistant referees: László Viszokai, Zoltán Szalai
Note: MTK won 10–3 on aggregate.

=== Ligakupa ===
==== Group stage ====
Pos	Team	Pld	W	D	L	GF	GA	GD	Pts	Qualification	UJP	PEC	KAP	ZAL	PAK	DUN
1	Újpest	10	6	2	2	25	15	+10	20	Advance to knockout phase	—	4–0	2–4	2–1	0–0	5–1
2	Pécs	10	6	2	2	24	14	+10	20	Advance to knockout phase	1–1	—	2–4	2–0	3–1	3–1
3	Kaposvár	10	6	1	3	26	20	+6	19		2–4	1–4	—	1–0	2–1	2–2
4	Zalaegerszeg	10	4	1	5	15	15	0	13		2–3	0–0	0–5	—	3–1	5–0
5	Paks	10	3	2	5	17	14	+3	11		3–1	0–1	4–0	0–2	—	2–2
6	Dunaújváros	10	0	2	8	11	40	−29	2		1–3	2–8	1–5	1–2	0–5	—

Source: HFF

1 October 2008 1	Kaposvár	2–4	Újpest	Kaposvár
16:00 CEST (UTC+2)	Reszli 24'; Tabi 78'	Report	Kéthévoama 14'; Lázár 29'; B. Szabó 35', 60'	Stadium: Rákóczi Stadion; Attendance: 200; Referee: Krisztián Pánczél; Assistant referees: Szabolcs Deutsch, Arnold Kepe

15 October 2008 2	Dunaújváros	1–5	Kaposvár	Dunaújváros
14:30 CEST (UTC+2)	Simpson 37'	Report	Ato 47', 59', 78'; Szeles (yellow card) 63'; Jovánczai (yellow card) 65', (goal) 66'; Kerekes 75'	Stadium: Dunaújvárosi Stadion; Attendance: 300; Referee: Ferenc Szöllősi; Assistant referees: Tibor Vígh, János Agócs

29 October 2008 3	Kaposvár	1–0	Zalaegerszeg	Kaposvár
14:00 CET (UTC+1)	Kerekes 66'	Report		Stadium: Rákóczi Stadion; Attendance: 100; Referee: József Erdős; Assistant referees: Róbert Kispál, Ferenc Varga

5 November 2008 4	Kaposvár	1–4	Pécs	Kaposvár
14:00 CET (UTC+1)	Reszli 67' (pen.)	Report	A. Nagy 11'; Z. Horváth 23', 32', 35'; Finta (yellow card) 66'	Stadium: Rákóczi Stadion; Attendance: 150; Referee: Ádám Németh; Assistant referees: György Ring, Zsolt Márton

12 November 2008 5	Paks	4–0	Kaposvár	Paks (Note: The match was played at the Paksi ASE Spottelep in Paks, instead of Paks regular stadium, the Fehérvári úti Stadion.)
13:00 CET (UTC+1)	J. Szabó 32'; I. Mészáros (yellow card) 40'; Tamási 45'; Márkus 47'; Weitner (yellow card) 85'; Buzás 90'	Report	Jovánczai (yellow card) 25'; L. Balogh (yellow card) 28'; Lá. Horváth (yellow card) 89'	Stadium: Paksi ASE Spottelep; Attendance: 120; Referee: Gábor Oláh; Assistant referees: Gergő Janitz, Ferenc Varga

22 November 2008 6	Újpest	2–4	Kaposvár	Budapest
15:00 CET (UTC+1)	Kéthévoama 34'; Rajczi 87', (red card) 90+3'	Report	Petrók 13'; Nem. Nikolić 16', 42'; Ćutuk 39' (o.g.); Grúz (yellow card) 74'	Stadium: Szusza Ferenc Stadion; Attendance: 500; Referee: Péter Solmyosi; Assistant referees: Gábor Takács, Oszkár Lémon

26 November 2008 8	Zalaegerszeg	0–5	Kaposvár	Zalaegerszeg
13:00 CET (UTC+1)		Report	Nem. Nikolić 6'; Božović 35', 53'; L. Balogh 64'; Kerekes 81'	Stadium: ZTE Arena; Attendance: 200; Referee: Dávid Ákos; Assistant referees: Oszkár Lémon, Gábor Takács

29 November 2008 7	Kaposvár	2–2	Dunaújváros	Kaposvár
13:00 CET (UTC+1)	Nem. Nikolić 30'; Zahorecz (yellow card) 46'; Božović 83'; Kovácsevics (yellow card) 86'	Report	I. Nagy 26', 27'; G. Szabó (yellow card) 84'	Stadium: Cseri út Attendance: 200; Referee: Szabolcs Szilasi; Assistant referees: István Iványi, Gábor Gyürüsi

8 February 2009 9	Pécs	2–4	Kaposvár	Pécs
14:00 CET (UTC+1)	T. Szalai 11' (pen.); Á. Kulcsár (yellow card) 50'; Szabados 57'	Report	K. Farkas 65', 90'; Petrók (yellow card) 69'; Reszli 83'; Nem. Nikolić 85'; Graszl (yellow card) 87'	Stadium: Stadion PMFC; Attendance: 300; Referee: József Berger; Assistant referees: Attila Forgács, László Sebestyén

14 February 2009 10	Kaposvár	2–1	Paks	Kaposvár
13:00 CET (UTC+1)	Nem. Nikolić 18', 34'; L. Pintér (yellow card) 28'	Report	Nikolov (red card) 21'; A. Pintér 29'; T. Kiss I (yellow card) 38'; Heffler (yellow card) 45'; S. Horváth (yellow card) 61'	Stadium: Cseri út Attendance: 100; Referee: István Vad; Assistant referees: Balázs Farkas, Arnold Kepe

== Statistics ==
=== Overall ===
Appearances (Apps) numbers are for appearances in competitive games only, including sub appearances.
Source: Competitions

No.	Player	Pos.	Nemzeti Bajnokság I				Magyar Kupa				Ligakupa				Total			
No.	Player	Pos.	Apps	Goal	Yellow card	Red card	Apps	Goal	Yellow card	Red card	Apps	Goal	Yellow card	Red card	Apps	Goal	Yellow card	Red card
1	(Hungary) László Horváth	GK	8				3				5		1		16		1	
2	(Hungary) Zoltán Jovánczai	FW	20				2				7	1	2		29	1	2	
3	(Hungary) László Pintér	DF	6								4		1		10		1	
3	(Hungary) Miklós Szolomájer	DF									4				4			
4	(Bosnia and Herzegovina) Boris Gujić	DF	24		4		4		1		3				31		5	
4	(Hungary) András Márton	DF									5				5			
6	(Hungary) Róbert Kovácsevics	DF	20	1	2		3				5		1		28	1	3	
7	(Hungary) Norbert Graszl	FW	1				2				3				6			
7	(Serbia) Nemanja Obrić	MF	29	2	5		4	3			6				39	5	5	
8	(Hungary) Krisztián Keczeli	MF									4				4			
8	(Hungary) Péter Németh	N/A									3				3			
8	(Hungary) István Ribi	DF	4				1				2				7			
9	(Hungary) Krisztián Farkas	FW	17	1	1						5	2			22	3	1	
10	(Serbia) Nemanja Nikolić	FW	22	16	2		3	1	1		5	7			30	24	3	
11	(Montenegro) Bojan Božović	FW	20	5	2		4	2			3	3			27	10	2	
13	(Brazil) Aílton	FW	6		1										6		1	
13	(France) Willi Oueifio	DF	1				2				2				5			
13	(Hungary) Tibor Tabi	N/A									4	1			4	1		
14	(Hungary) Béla Zsolt Kerekes	FW									5	3			5	3		
14	(Hungary) Milán Németh	FW									5				5			
15	(Ghana) Ellis Samuel Ato	FW	3				3	1			8	3			14	4		
15	(Hungary) Róbert Zsolnai	FW	15	8	1										15	8	1	
16	(Hungary) Gábor Reszli	FW	7	1			2				8	3			17	4		
17	(Hungary) Viktor Petrók	DF	26	2	8		3	1	1		3	1	1		32	4	10	
18	(Hungary) Benjamin Balázs	MF									3				3			
18	(Hungary) László Balogh	MF					1				7	1	1		8	1	1	
19	(Hungary) Krisztián Pest	MF	24		6		2				1				27		6	
20	(Hungary) Zoltán Farkas	MF	23		2		3				4				30		2	
21	(Hungary) Károly Graszl	DF	18		3		4				8		1		30		4	
22	(Hungary) Szabolcs Szeles	DF					1				9		1		10		1	
23	(Hungary) Tamás Horváth	GK									1				1			
24	(Hungary) Dávid Hegedűs	MF	14		2						1				15		2	
24	(Hungary) Ferenc Keresztes	N/A									1				1			
24	(Hungary) Dénes Szakály	FW	5								4				9			
25	(Hungary) Gábor Bogdán	DF	22	2	4		2				1				25	2	4	
26	(Hungary) Tamás Grúz	DF	28	1	7	1	3	1			4		1		35	2	8	1
28	(Hungary) Krisztián Zahorecz	DF	28	11	6	1	3	1	1		6		1		37	12	8	1
29	(Hungary) Zoltán Kovács	GK	23		3		1				4				28		3	
Own goals				1								1				2		
Totals				51	59	2		10	4			26	11			87	74	2

=== Hat-tricks ===
No.	Player	Against	Result	Date	Competition
5	(Serbia) Nemanja Obrić	Gránit Gyógyfürdő (A)	6–0	24 September 2008	Magyar Kupa
15	(Ghana) Ellis Samuel Ato	Dunaújváros (A)	5–1	15 October 2008	Ligakupa
15	(Hungary) Róbert Zsolnai	Siófok (A)	5–2	25 April 2009	Nemzeti Bajnokság I

=== Clean sheets ===
			Clean sheets			
No.	Player	Games Played	Nemzeti Bajnokság I	Magyar Kupa	Ligakupa	Total
29	(Hungary) Zoltán Kovács	28	5		1	6
1	(Hungary) László Horváth	16	2	2	1	5
23	(Hungary) Tamás Horváth	1				
Totals			7	2	2	11
