= 2006–07 Kaposvári Rákóczi FC season =

Kaposvár
2006–07 season
- Owner: FC ownership share (66.7%); Private individuals (33.3%)
- Manager: László Prukner
- Stadium: Rákóczi Stadion
- Nemzeti Bajnokság I: 7th
- Magyar Kupa: Round of 16
- Top goalscorer: League: Lóránt Oláh (12); All: Lóránt Oláh (13)
- Highest home attendance: 3,000 (multiple Nemzeti Bajnokság I matches)
- Lowest home attendance: 1,000 v Honvéd (22 November 2006, Magyar Kupa)
- Average home league attendance: 2,487
- Biggest win: 4–0 v Tatabánya (Home, 10 March 2007, Nemzeti Bajnokság I)
- Biggest defeat: 0–4 v Honvéd (Home, 22 November 2006, Magyar Kupa)

The 2006–07 season was Kaposvári Rákóczi Football Club's 8th competitive season, 3rd consecutive season in the Nemzeti Bajnokság I and 83rd season in existence as a football club. In addition to the domestic league, Kaposvár participated in that season's editions of the Magyar Kupa.

== Squad ==
Squad at end of season

Note: Flags indicate national team as defined under FIFA eligibility rules; some limited exceptions apply. Players may hold more than one non-FIFA nationality.

No.	Pos.	Nation	Player
1	GK	HUN	Árpád Milinte
2	DF	SRB	Zsolt Radics
3	MF	HUN	Attila Pintér
5	MF	HUN	Péter Szakály
6	DF	HUN	Róbert Kovácsevics
8	DF	HUN	István Ribi
9	FW	BRA	André Alves
11	FW	MNE	Bojan Božović
13	DF	HUN	Tamás Mező
14	FW	HUN	Lóránt Oláh

No.	Pos.	Nation	Player
15	DF	SLO	Admir Suljić
16	FW	HUN	Gábor Reszli
17	DF	HUN	Viktor Petrók
18	MF	HUN	László Balogh
22	MF	SRB	Dušan Vasiljević
25	MF	HUN	Béla Maróti
26	DF	HUN	Tamás Grúz
27	FW	HUN	Dénes Szakály
28	DF	HUN	Krisztián Zahorecz
29	GK	HUN	Zoltán Kovács

== Competitions ==
=== Overview ===
Competition	First match	Last match	Starting round	Final position	Record							
Competition	First match	Last match	Starting round	Final position	Pld	W	D	L	GF	GA	GD	Win %
Nemzeti Bajnokság I	29 July 2006	26 May 2007	Matchday 1	7th	30	12	5	13	40	36	+4	40.00
Magyar Kupa	20 September 2006	22 November 2006	Third round	Round of 16	4	2	1	1	7	5	+2	50.00
Total					34	14	6	14	47	41	+6	41.18

Source: Competitions

=== Nemzeti Bajnokság I ===
==== League table ====
Pos	Team	Pld	W	D	L	GF	GA	GD	Pts	Qualification or relegation
5	Vasas	30	13	6	11	43	41	+2	45	
6	Fehérvár	30	13	5	12	45	43	+2	44	
7	Kaposvár	30	12	5	13	40	36	+4	41	
8	Honvéd	30	11	8	11	48	43	+5	41	Qualification for the UEFA Cup first qualifying round (Note: Honvéd qualified for the UEFA Cup first qualifying round as the 2006–07 Magyar Kupa winners.)
9	Diósgyőr	30	11	5	14	40	52	−12	38	

Source: soccerway.com

==== Results summary ====
Overall								Home						Away					
Pld	W	D	L	GF	GA	GD	Pts	W	D	L	GF	GA	GD	W	D	L	GF	GA	GD
30	12	5	13	40	36	+4	41	9	1	5	26	14	+12	3	4	8	14	22	−8

Source: Hungarian Football Federation

==== Results by round ====
Round	1	2	3	4	5	6	7	8	9	10	11	12	13	14	15	16	17	18	19	20	21	22	23	24	25	26	27	28	29	30
Ground	H	A	A	H	A	H	A	H	A	H	A	H	A	H	A	A	H	H	A	H	A	H	A	H	A	H	A	H	A	H
Result	L	D	W	L	L	W	L	L	L	W	D	W	L	L	L	L	L	W	L	W	W	W	D	W	D	W	L	D	W	W
Position	11	12	8	12	13	8	10	13	13	12	12	11	12	13	14	15	15	15	15	14	12	12	12	9	9	7	9	9	8	7
Points	0	1	4	4	4	7	7	7	7	10	11	14	14	14	14	14	14	17	17	20	23	26	27	30	31	34	34	35	38	41

Source: Matches
A = Away; H = Home; W = Win; D = Draw; L = Loss

==== Matches ====
29 July 2006 1	Kaposvár	0–1	Vasas	Kaposvár
20:00 CEST (UTC+2)	P. Szakály (yellow card) 3'; Vasiljević (yellow card) 47'; Andruskó (yellow card) 69'	Report	N. Németh (yellow card) 28'; Mogyoróssy (red card) 32'; A. Tóth 60'; Pandur (yellow card) 68'; G. Németh (yellow card) 85'; Lázok (yellow card) 89'	Stadium: Rákóczi Stadion; Attendance: 2,500; Referee: István Mészáros; Assistant referees: Dr. Péter Szabó, László Viszokai; Fourth official: Péter Tatai

5 August 2006 2	Honvéd	2–2	Kaposvár	Budapest (Note: The match was played at the Béke téri Stadion in Budapest, instead of Honvéd regular stadium, the Bozsik József Stadion in Budapest, due to the renovation work.)
20:00 CEST (UTC+2)	Genito (yellow card) 11'; Dobos 21' (pen.); Disztl 72'; Budovinszky (yellow card) 76'	Report	Vasiljević 39'; Grúz 80'	Stadium: Béke téri Stadion; Attendance: 2,000; Referee: János Megyebíró; Assistant referees: Zsolt Szpisják, István Albert; Fourth official: Miklós Demeter

19 August 2006 3	Dunakanyar-Vác	0–1	Kaposvár	Vác
19:00 CEST (UTC+2)	Palásthy (yellow card) 30'; P. Kovács (yellow card) 32'	Report	Zahorecz (yellow card) 19'; P. Szakály 47'; Grúz (yellow card) 50'	Stadium: Ligeti Stadion; Attendance: 1,500; Referee: Péter Solymosi; Assistant referees: Tibor Vámos, Zoltán Kis; Fourth official: Gábor Péter Kovács

25 August 2006 4	Kaposvár	1–2	Debrecen	Kaposvár
19:00 CEST (UTC+2)	Grúz (yellow card) 33'; Andruskó 55'; Kovácsevics (yellow card) 57'	Report	Bogdanović 15'; Bernáth (yellow card) 47'; B. Virág (yellow card) 51'; Sidibe (yellow card) 55'; Hegedűs (yellow card) 86'; Z. Kiss 87'	Stadium: Rákóczi Stadion; Attendance: 2,000; Referee: István Vad; Assistant referees: Róbert Kispál, Zoltán Kis; Fourth official: András Sóthy

9 September 2006 5	Tatabánya	4–2	Kaposvár	Tatabánya
16:30 CEST (UTC+2)	Kouemaha 27'; Megyesi 44'; Vámosi 48'; Hajdú 57'	Report	Alves 59'; Zahorecz 74'	Stadium: Városi Stadion; Attendance: 2,800; Referee: Sándor Andó-Szabó; Assistant referees: Dr. Péter Kovács, Tamás Raff; Fourth official: Gergő Király

16 September 2006 6	Kaposvár	1–0	Fehérvár	Kaposvár
19:00 CEST (UTC+2)	Zahorecz 15'; Suljić (yellow card) 16'; Andruskó (yellow card) 28'; Kovácsevics (yellow card) 52'; Vasiljević (red card) 78'	Report	Csizmadia (yellow card) 83'	Stadium: Rákóczi Stadion; Attendance: 2,000; Referee: Ferenc Bede; Assistant referees: Dr. Péter Szabó, Balázs Huszár; Fourth official: Gergely Sulyok

23 September 2006 7	MTK	2–0	Kaposvár	Budapest
19:00 CEST (UTC+2)	Kanta 42'; Bori 50'; L. Horváth (yellow card) 90'	Report	Suljić (yellow card) 44'; Petrók (yellow card) 60'; Z. Varga II (yellow card) 69'	Stadium: Hidegkuti Nándor Stadion; Attendance: 1,500; Referee: István Vad; Assistant referees: Tamás Márkus, Gyula Ortó; Fourth official: József Berger

30 September 2006 8	Kaposvár	1–2	Diósgyőr	Kaposvár
18:00 CEST (UTC+2)	Zahorecz (yellow card) 9'; Grúz (yellow card) 65' (yellow-red card) 69'; Alves 75'	Report	Farkas (yellow card) 15'; Buz (yellow card) 45' (yellow-red card) 47'; Szögedi 52'; Kéthévoama (yellow card) 81', (goal) 90+3'	Stadium: Rákóczi Stadion; Attendance: 2,000; Referee: Zoltán Szarka; Assistant referees: Zoltán Kovács, Dr. Péter Szabó; Fourth official: Tamás Bognár

14 October 2006 9	Győr	3–1	Kaposvár	Győr (Note: The match was played at the Nádorvárosi Stadion in Győr, instead of Győr regular stadium, the Stadion ETO in Győr, which was demolished to make way to the newly built ETO Park.)
15:00 CEST (UTC+2)	Mátyus 6'; Bajzát 15'; Dudás (yellow card) 35'; P. Tóth 65'; G. Varga (red card) 66'	Report	Vasiljević (yellow card) 32'; Kozmér (yellow card) 41'; Alves 67'; Venczel (yellow card) 79'	Stadium: Nádorvárosi Stadion; Attendance: 1,500; Referee: Tamás Bognár; Assistant referees: Dr. Péter Szabó, Balázs Huszár; Fourth official: Krisztián Király

23 October 2006 10	Kaposvár	1–0	Újpest	Kaposvár
18:00 CEST (UTC+2)	P. Szakály 45'; Grúz (yellow card) 55'; Vasiljević (yellow card) 60'	Report	Sándor (yellow card) 43'; Vermes (yellow card) 70'; B. Tóth (yellow card) 81'	Stadium: Rákóczi Stadion; Attendance: 3,000; Referee: Sándor Andó-Szabó; Assistant referees: Zsolt Szpisják, János Medovarszki; Fourth official: Attila Hegedűs

28 October 2006 11	Rákospalota	1–1	Kaposvár	Budapest
14:30 CEST (UTC+2)	Torma 40'; Sallai (yellow card) 57'; Makra (yellow card) 76'	Report	Petrók (yellow card) 37'; Oláh 89'; Maróti (red card) 89'	Stadium: Budai II. László Stadion; Attendance: 1,000; Referee: Károly Török; Assistant referees: Szabolcs Deutsch, Zsolt Szalai; Fourth official: Balázs Világi

4 November 2006 12	Kaposvár	3–1	Zalaegerszeg	Kaposvár
17:00 CET (UTC+1)	Oláh 6', 42'; Kovácsevics (yellow card) 38'; Suljić (yellow card) 60'; Alves 70'	Report	J. Sebők (yellow card) 32'; Waltner 69'; Z. Tóth (yellow card) 72'	Stadium: Rákóczi Stadion; Attendance: 2,500; Referee: Tamás Arany; Assistant referees: Oszkár Lémon, Zsolt Márton; Fourth official: Miklós Demeter

11 November 2006 13	Sopron	1–0	Kaposvár	Sopron
17:00 CET (UTC+1)	A. Horváth (yellow card) 34'; Feczesin 38'; Demjén (yellow card) 59'; Bagoly (yellow card) 89'	Report	Andruskó (yellow card) 82'; Oláh (red card) 87'	Stadium: Káposztás utcai Stadion; Attendance: 1,500; Referee: Sándor Gergely; Assistant referees: Szabolcs Deutsch, Zsolt Szalai; Fourth official: Norbert Kiss

18 November 2006 14	Kaposvár	1–2	Pécs	Kaposvár
16:00 CET (UTC+1)	Z. Varga II (yellow card) 17'; Zahorecz (yellow card) 29'; Radics (yellow card) 37'; Venczel 76'; Petrók (red card) 90+1'	Report	Balaskó (yellow card) 23'; Pavičević (yellow card) 28'; Kulcsár 56', 58', (yellow card) 90+2'; Dienes (yellow card) 90+3'	Stadium: Rákóczi Stadion; Attendance: 3,000; Referee: Viktor Kassai; Assistant referees: Gábor Erős, Tibor Vámos; Fourth official: Péter Herbály

25 November 2006 15	Paks	1–0	Kaposvár	Paks
13:00 CET (UTC+1)	Belényesi 20'; Fehér (yellow card) 68'	Report	Vasiljević (yellow card) 69'; Alves (yellow card) 90+1'	Stadium: Fehérvári úti Stadion; Attendance: 1,000; Referee: Zoltán Iványi; Assistant referees: Zsolt Szpisják, Dr. Péter Hegyi; Fourth official: Attila Hegedűs

2 December 2006 16	Vasas	1–0	Kaposvár	Budapest
15:00 CET (UTC+1)	Z. Pintér (yellow card) 45'; Lázok 61'; T. Nagy (yellow card) 63'; K. Kiss (yellow card) 71'; Skita (yellow card) 90+3'	Report	Grúz (yellow card) 39'; Zahorecz (yellow card) 74'; Kovácsevics (red card) 90+3'	Stadium: Illovszky Rudolf Stadion; Attendance: 1,000; Referee: Péter Solymosi; Assistant referees: Attila Kelemen, Zoltán Pápai; Fourth official: Róbert Nagy

8 December 2006 17	Kaposvár	1–2	Honvéd	Kaposvár
17:00 CET (UTC+1)	Suljić (yellow card) 6'; Andruskó (yellow card) 29'; Alves 45'; D. Szakály (yellow card) 68'; Zahorecz (yellow card) 76'	Report	Disztl 10', (yellow card) 81'; Koós 57'; Zana (yellow card) 60'	Stadium: Rákóczi Stadion; Attendance: 3,000; Referee: Ferenc Bede; Assistant referees: Zsolt Márton, Balázs Farkas; Fourth official: Gergely Sulyok

24 February 2007 18	Kaposvár	3–0	Dunakanyar-Vác	Kaposvár
15:00 CET (UTC+1)	Oláh 22', 76'; Alves 31', (yellow card) 40'; Maróti (yellow card) 62'	Report	Palásthy (yellow card) 66'	Stadium: Rákóczi Stadion; Attendance: 2,500; Referee: Gyöngyi Gaál; Assistant referees: Zoltán Tompos, Zoltán Szalai; Fourth official: Gergely Sulyok

5 March 2007 19	Debrecen	1–0	Kaposvár	Debrecen
18:00 CET (UTC+1)	Leandro (yellow card) 58'; Sidibe 71'; Z. Kiss (yellow card) 76'; Dzsudzsák (yellow card) 90'	Report	Oláh (yellow card) 20'; Božović (yellow card) 29'	Stadium: Oláh Gábor utcai Stadion; Attendance: 7,000; Referee: Mihály Fábián; Assistant referees: Gyula Ortó, Dr. Zsolt Varga; Fourth official: János Takács

10 March 2007 20	Kaposvár	4–0	Tatabánya	Kaposvár
16:00 CET (UTC+1)	Vasiljević 8'; P. Szakály 18'; Maróti (yellow card) 61'; Alves 71'; Oláh 83'	Report	Szilágyi (yellow card) 13'; Vámosi (yellow card) 50'; Kerényi (yellow card) 54'	Stadium: Rákóczi Stadion; Attendance: 1,500; Referee: Zoltán Iványi; Assistant referees: István Albert, Dr. Ádám Vári; Fourth official: Csaba Ursprung

17 March 2007 21	Fehérvár	1–2	Kaposvár	Székesfehérvár
16:00 CET (UTC+1)	F. Horváth 55'; Kuttor (red card) 59'	Report	Ribi (yellow card) 23'; Zahorecz 60'; Grúz (yellow card) 62'; Oláh 66'; Petrók (yellow card) 88'	Stadium: Sóstói Stadion; Attendance: 1,800; Referee: Sándor Andó-Szabó; Assistant referees: Zsolt Szpisják, János Medovarszki; Fourth official: József Erdős

31 March 2007 22	Kaposvár	1–0	MTK	Kaposvár
16:00 CEST (UTC+2)	Alves 43'; Kovácsevics (yellow card) 67'; Mező (red card) 75'; Maróti (yellow card) 90+1'	Report	Á. Pintér (yellow card) 62'; L. Horváth (yellow card) 83'; Urbán (yellow card) 88'	Stadium: Rákóczi Stadion; Attendance: 2,500; Referee: Sándor Gergely; Assistant referees: Zoltán Kis, László Viszokai; Fourth official: András Sóthy

7 April 2007 23	Diósgyőr	1–1	Kaposvár	Miskolc
17:00 CEST (UTC+2)	Kéthévoama 32'; Katona (yellow card) 80'	Report	Zahorecz (yellow card) 18'; Alves 28'; P. Szakály (yellow card) 78'	Stadium: Diósgyőri Stadion; Attendance: 4,500; Referee: István Vad; Assistant referees: Attila Kelemen, Gyula Fehér; Fourth official: János Takács

14 April 2007 24	Kaposvár	2–1	Győr	Kaposvár
17:00 CEST (UTC+2)	Oláh 47', 50'; Ribi (red card) 80'	Report	R. Varga 1'; Müller (yellow card) 33'; Dudás (yellow card) 36'; Jäkl (yellow card) 72'	Stadium: Rákóczi Stadion; Attendance: 3,000; Referee: Ferenc Bede; Assistant referees: Zoltán Szalai, Zoltán Kovács; Fourth official: Csaba Ursprung

21 April 2007 25	Újpest	0–0	Kaposvár	Budapest
18:00 CEST (UTC+2)	Erős (yellow card) 77'	Report	Maróti (yellow card) 54'; Petrók (yellow card) 86'; Zahorecz (yellow card) 86'	Stadium: Szusza Ferenc Stadion; Attendance: 2,500; Referee: Tamás Bognár; Assistant referees: Dr. Péter Szabó, Balázs Huszár; Fourth official: Csaba Pintér

28 April 2007 26	Kaposvár	3–1	Rákospalota	Kaposvár
18:00 CEST (UTC+2)	Maróti (yellow card) 50'; Oláh 53'; Vasiljević 67', 70'; Božović (yellow card) 81'; A. Pintér (yellow card) 82'	Report	Somorjai 17'; Pusztai (yellow card) 47'; Schrancz (yellow card) 74'; Makra (yellow card) 88'	Stadium: Rákóczi Stadion; Attendance: 2,500; Referee: Péter Solymosi; Assistant referees: Zoltán Kis, Oszkár Lémon; Fourth official: Krisztián Marton

7 May 2007 27	Zalaegerszeg	2–1	Kaposvár	Zalaegerszeg
18:00 CEST (UTC+2)	Dianu (yellow card) 12' (yellow-red card) 60'; Waltner 31'; Ljubojević 40', (yellow card) 81'; Ludánszki (yellow card) 64'; Z. Tóth (yellow card) 69'; Ramadani (yellow card) 90'	Report	Zahorecz 12' (pen.), (yellow card) 20'; Maróti (yellow card) 30'; Mező (yellow card) 35'; Grúz (yellow card) 81'	Stadium: ZTE Arena; Attendance: 2,800; Referee: Krisztián Pánczél; Assistant referees: György Ring, Gábor Takács; Fourth official: Csaba Pintér

12 May 2007 28	Kaposvár	2–2	Sopron	Kaposvár
18:00 CEST (UTC+2)	Vasiljević 3'; A. Pintér (yellow card) 71', (goal) 88'; Petrók (yellow card) 76'	Report	Magasföldi 7'; Ibric (yellow card) 75'; Demjén 89'; Cigan (yellow card) 90+2'	Stadium: Rákóczi Stadion; Attendance: 2,800; Referee: Csaba Imre Sápi; Assistant referees: László Viszokai, Szabolcs Deutsch; Fourth official: Csaba Ursprung

19 May 2007 29	Pécs	2–3	Kaposvár	Pécs
19:00 CEST (UTC+2)	Sztipánovics 4'; Pest (yellow card) 36'; Lukács 43'; Szabados (yellow card) 55'; Szekeres (yellow card) 72'	Report	Oláh 48'; Vasiljević 52', 74'; P. Szakály (yellow card) 79'; Maróti (yellow card) 86'	Stadium: Stadion PMFC; Attendance: 1,500; Referee: István Vad; Assistant referees: Tibor Vámos, Zoltán Szalai; Fourth official: Gábor Péter Kovács

26 May 2007 30	Kaposvár	2–0	Paks	Kaposvár
18:00 CEST (UTC+2)	Petrók (yellow card) 26'; Oláh 77'; Alves 84'	Report	Tamási (yellow card) 88'	Stadium: Rákóczi Stadion; Attendance: 2,500; Referee: Sándor Gergely; Assistant referees: Gábor Kormányos II, Zoltán Kovács; Fourth official: István Zoltán Fülöp

=== Magyar Kupa ===
20 September 2006 Third round	Csurgó	0–3	Kaposvár	Csurgó
15:30 CEST (UTC+2)		Report	Z. Varga II 2x; Andruskó	Stadium: Városi Sporttelep; Attendance: 200; Referee: Sándor Gergely

18 October 2006 Round of 32	Csesztreg	0–3	Kaposvár	Csesztreg
14:30 CEST (UTC+2)	Pilisi (yellow card) 77'	Report	Maróti (yellow card) 11'; Alves 36', 84'; P. Szakály (yellow card) 58'; Vasiljević 82' (pen.)	Stadium: Csesztregi Szabadidőközpont; Attendance: 300; Referee: Király; Assistant referees: Schuszter, Huszár

==== Round of 16 ====
8 November 2006 First leg	Honvéd	1–1	Kaposvár	Budapest
18:00 CET (UTC+1)	Hercegfalvi (yellow card) 28', (goal) 35'; Schindler (yellow card) 65'	Report	Kovácsevics (yellow card) 45'; Grúz (yellow card) 54'; Oláh 72'	Stadium: Béke téri Stadion; Attendance: 400; Referee: Csaba Imre Sápi; Assistant referees: Z. Szalai, István Tóth

22 November 2006 Second leg	Kaposvár	0–4 (1–5 agg.)	Honvéd	Kaposvár
17:00 CET (UTC+1)	Kozmér (yellow card) 34' (yellow-red card) 58'; Zahorecz (red card) 78'	Report	Dobos 33', 57'; Genito (yellow card) 45'; Kovácsevics 65' (o.g.); Pomper (yellow card) 71'; Hercegfalvi 69', (red card) 78'; Mészáros (yellow card) 78'	Stadium: Rákóczi Stadion; Attendance: 1,000; Referee: Tamás Bognár; Assistant referees: Dr. Péter Szabó, István Iványi
Note: Honvéd won 5–1 on aggregate.

== Statistics ==
=== Overall ===
Appearances (Apps) numbers are for appearances in competitive games only, including sub appearances.
Source: Competitions

No.	Player	Pos.	Nemzeti Bajnokság I				Magyar Kupa				Total			
No.	Player	Pos.	Apps	Goal	Yellow card	Red card	Apps	Goal	Yellow card	Red card	Apps	Goal	Yellow card	Red card
1	(Hungary) Árpád Milinte	GK	27								27			
2	(Serbia) Zsolt Radics	DF	14		1		3				17		1	
3	(Hungary) Attila Pintér	MF	18	1	2		2				20	1	2	
5	(Hungary) Péter Szakály	MF	27	3	3		4		1		31	3	4	
6	(Hungary) Róbert Kovácsevics	DF	24		4	1	3		1		27		5	1
8	(Hungary) István Ribi	DF	7		1	1					7		1	1
8	(Hungary) Balázs Venczel	FW	11	1	1		3				14	1	1	
9	(Brazil) André Alves	FW	30	10	2		4	2			34	12	2	
11	(Serbia) Attila Andruskó	MF	12	1	4		2	1			14	2	4	
11	(Montenegro) Bojan Božović	FW	7		2						7		2	
13	(Hungary) Tamás Mező	DF	13		1	1					13		1	1
14	(Hungary) Lóránt Oláh	FW	29	12	1	1	3	1			32	13	1	1
15	(Slovenia) Admir Suljić	DF	16		4		1				17		4	
16	(Hungary) Gábor Reszli	FW	1								1			
17	(Hungary) Viktor Petrók	DF	25		6	1	3				28		6	1
18	(Hungary) László Balogh	MF	1								1			
18	(Hungary) Gábor Huzmi	MF	1								1			
20	(Slovakia) Ladislav Kozmér	DF	14		1		3		1	1	17		2	1
21	(Hungary) Zoltán Varga	MF	15		2		3	2			18	2	2	
22	(Serbia) Dušan Vasiljević	MF	27	7	4	1	4	1			31	8	4	1
25	(Hungary) Béla Maróti	MF	20		7	1	3		1		23		8	1
26	(Hungary) Tamás Grúz	DF	22	1	7	1	4		1		26	1	8	1
27	(Hungary) Dénes Szakály	FW	18		1		2				20		1	
28	(Hungary) Krisztián Zahorecz	DF	27	4	8		3			1	30	4	8	1
29	(Hungary) László Horváth	GK												
29	(Hungary) Zoltán Kovács	GK	3				4				7			
Own goals														
Totals				40	62	8		7	5	2		47	67	10

=== Clean sheets ===
			Clean sheets		
No.	Player	Games Played	Nemzeti Bajnokság I	Magyar Kupa	Total
1	(Hungary) Árpád Milinte	27	7		7
29	(Hungary) Zoltán Kovács	7	1	2	3
29	(Hungary) László Horváth				
Totals			8	2	10
