= List of people from Kaposvár =

The following list includes notable people who were born or have lived in Kaposvár, Somogy County, Hungary.

== Arts ==
- Béla Babai (1914-1997), Romani-American musician
- László Babarczy (born 1941), Hungarian theater director.
- Aurél Bernáth (1895–1982), Hungarian painter, art theorist.
- István Bors (1938–2003), Hungarian sculptor.
- Béla Faragó (born 1961), Hungarian composer.
- Sándor Galimberti (1883–1915), Hungarian painter.
- János Gyenes (1912–1995), Hungarian photographer.
- Zsolt Homonnay (born 1971), Hungarian actor.
- Ilona Ivancsics (born 1960), Hungarian actress.
- Ferenc Martyn (1899–1986), Hungarian artist, sculptor, graphic designer.
- Zoltán Őszi (born 1967), Hungarian graphic designer, illustrator.
- Judit Pogány (born 1944), Hungarian actress.
- József Rippl-Rónai (1861–1927), Hungarian painter.
- Magdolna Szőnyi (1915–1992), Hungarian arts teacher, artist.
- Klári Varga (born 1970), Hungarian actress.
- Zsuzsanna Varga (born 1970), Hungarian actress.
- János Vaszary (1817–1939), Hungarian painter, graphic artist.

== Church ==
- Béla Balás (born 1941), Hungarian Bishop of Kaposvár.

== Literature ==
- Róbert Cey-Bert (born 1938), Hungarian writer, psychosociologist, food historian and a university professor.
- Éva Czipri (1943–1974), Hungarian chemist, poet.
- Kriszta D. Tóth (born 1975), Hungarian author, journalist, ambassador of UNICEF.
- Éva Fésűs (born 1926), Hungarian author.
- Árpád Papp (1937–2010), Hungarian poet, literature historian, translator, teacher.
- Gábor Rozsos (born 1965), Hungarian poet.
- István Kemsei (born 1944), Hungarian poet, essayist, teacher, librarian.
- Tamás Szabó Kimmel (born 1984), Hungarian actor.
- Manó Kónyi (1842–?), Hungarian stenographer, publicist.
- Manó Marton (1874–1928), Hungarian journalist, editor, poet.
- Ludwig Scharf (1864–1939), German lyricist, translator.
- Fruzina Szalay (1864–1926), Hungarian poet, translator.
- Atala Kisfaludy (1836–1911) Hungary poet, writer.
- Gyula Takáts (1911–2008), Hungarian poet, author, translator, teacher.

== Military ==
- Béla Király (1912–2009), Hungarian army officer.
- László Merész (1915–1997), Hungarian soldier.

== Politics ==
- István Gyenesei (born 1948), Hungarian politician.
- Imre Nagy (1896–1958), Hungarian politician.
- Alajos Záborszky (1805–1862), Hungarian politician, lawyer.

== Science ==
- Sándor Abday (1800–1882), Hungarian actor, theater director.
- György Buzsáki (born 1949), Hungarian neuroscientist.
- Péter Frankl (born 1953), Hungarian mathematician, street performer, columnist, educator.
- Péter Hanák (1921–1997), Hungarian historian, cultural historian.
- János Haraszti (1924–2007), Hungarian veterinarian, university teacher, researcher.
- Moritz Kaposi (1837–1902), Hungarian physician, dermatologist, discoverer of the skin tumor called Kaposi's sarcoma.
- Ernő Lendvai (1925–1993), Hungarian mathematician, music theorists.
- György Németh (born 1956), Hungarian historian, teacher.
- Lajos Papp (born 1948), Hungarian heart surgeon, professor.
- Virag Dora (born 1993), Hungarian medical doctor.

== Sports ==
=== Football ===
- Szabolcs Balajcza (born 1979), Hungarian football player.
- Benjamin Balázs (born 1990), Hungarian football player.
- István Bank (born 1984), Hungarian football player.
- Lukács Bőle (born 1990), Hungarian football player.
- Győző Burcsa (born 1954), Hungarian football player.
- Zoltán Czibor (1929–1997), Hungarian football player.
- Zoltán Farkas (born 1989), Hungarian football player.
- Zoltán Finta (born 1979), Hungarian football player.
- László Horváth (born 1988), Hungarian football player.
- Zoltán Jovánczai (born 1984), Hungarian football player.
- Béla Koplárovics (born 1981), Hungarian football player.
- Viktor Petrók (born 1981), Hungarian football player.
- Gábor Reszli (born 1988), Hungarian football player.
- Róbert Waltner (born 1977), Hungarian football player.

=== Other sports ===
- Antal Bolvári (born 1932), Hungarian water polo player.
- Ferenc Csik (1913–1945), Hungarian swimmer.
- Leila Gyenesei (born 1986), Hungarian modern pentathlete, cross-country skier.
- Árpád Lengyel (1915–1993), Hungarian swimmer.
- Attila May (born 1942), Hungarian fencer.
- Anna Pfeffer (born 1945), Hungarian sprint canoeist.
- László Sótonyi (born 1970), Hungarian handball player, coach.

== Technology ==
- Péter Horn (born 1942), Hungarian agricultural engineer, professor.
- György Szigetvári (1926–2018), Hungarian architect.

== Other ==
- Csilla Molnár (1969–1986), Hungarian beauty queen.
