= Haraszti =

Haraszti is a Hungarian surname. Notable people with the surname include:

- Emil Haraszti (1885–1958), Hungarian-born French music critic and writer
- Gábor Haraszti, Hungarian sprint canoeist
- János Haraszti (1924- 2007), Hungarian veterinarian, academic
- Mici Haraszti (1882–1964), Hungarian actress
- Miklós Haraszti (born 1945), Hungarian writer, journalist and academic
- Zsolt Haraszti (born 1991), Hungarian footballer
