= Kaposvölgye VSC =

Hungarian football club

Kaposvölgye
- Full name: Kaposvölgye VSC
- Nickname: Berki
- Founded: 1936
- Ground: Vásártéri Sporttelep, Nagyberki
- Capacity: 2,000
- Chairman: Róbert Pusztai
- Manager: Lajos Horváth
- League: NB II (Western Group)
- 2008–09: 6th
| Home colours | Away colours |

Kaposvölgye VSC is a Hungarian football team in Nagyberki.

== Squad ==
Note: Flags indicate national team as defined under FIFA eligibility rules; some limited exceptions apply. Players may hold more than one non-FIFA nationality.

| No. | Pos. | Nation | Player |
|---|---|---|---|
| 1 | GK | HUN | András Köllö |
| 2 | DF | HUN | Ádám Horváth |
| 5 | MF | HUN | József Fellai |
| 6 | DF | HUN | Gergö Menyhért |
| 7 | MF | HUN | Gábor Huzmi |
| 8 | MF | HUN | Bence Kalmár |
| 9 | MF | HUN | Gábor Ivusza |
| 11 | FW | UKR | Yuriy Shevel |
| 12 | MF | GHA | Ellis Samuel Ato |
| 13 | MF | HUN | László Pintér |
| 14 | MF | BRA | Sandro |
| 16 | FW | HUN | Gábor Reszli |
| 17 | DF | HUN | Krisztián Dóczi |
| 18 | MF | HUN | László Balogh |
| 23 | GK | HUN | László Horváth |
