= Attila Andruskó =

Serbian footballer

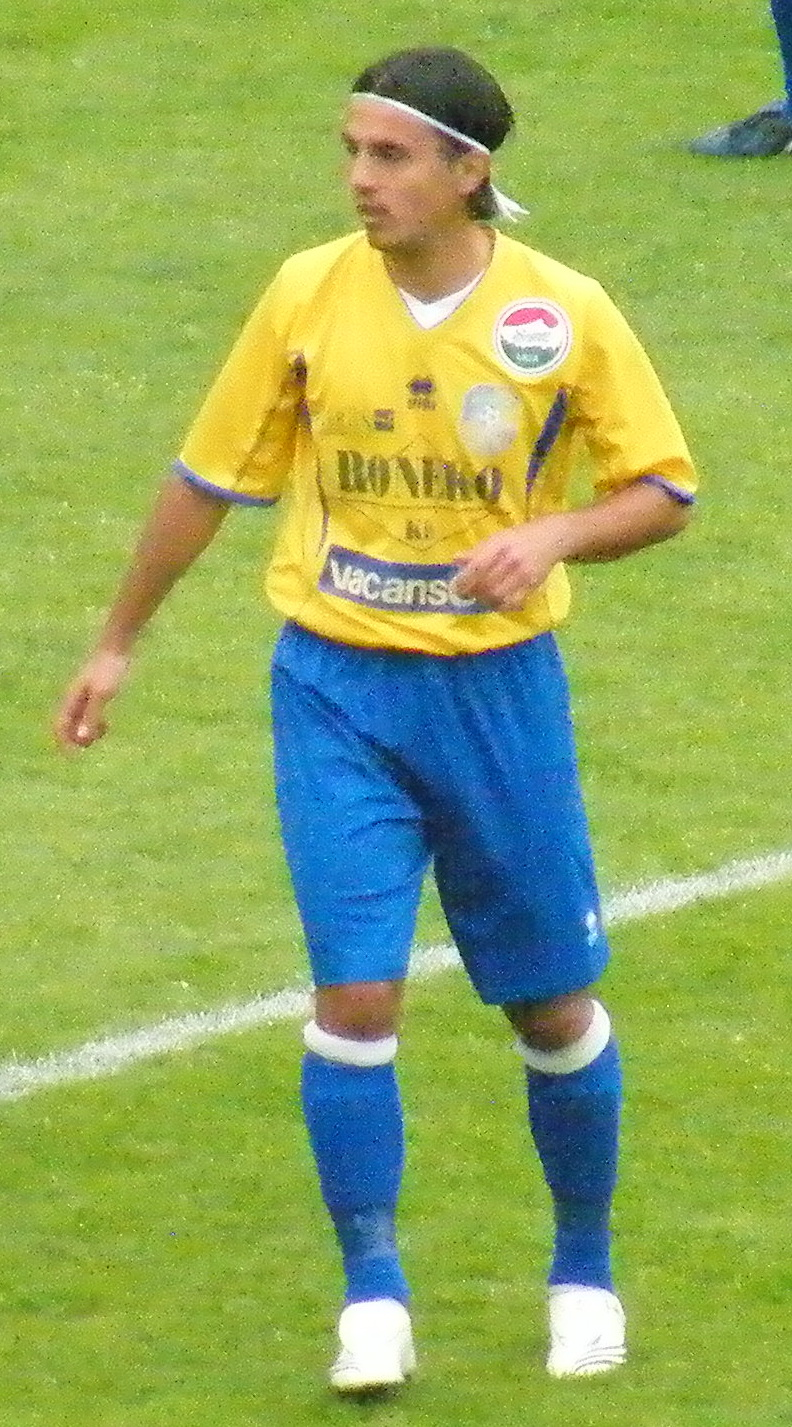
- Andruskó with Siófok in 2009

Personal information
- Full name: Attila Andruskó
- Date of birth: 12 October 1980 (age 46)
- Place of birth: Senta, SFR Yugoslavia
- Height: 1.78 m (5 ft 10 in)
- Position: Midfielder

Youth career
- Senta

Senior career*
Years	Team	Apps	(Gls)
2001–2002	Solunac Karađorđevo	28	(6)
2003–2006	Kaposvár	64	(1)
2007–2008	Primorje	20	(2)
2008	Kaposvölgye	15	(6)
2009	Siófok	10	(0)
2009	Kaposvölgye	11	(2)
2010	Szentlőrinc-PVSK	12	(3)
2010–2011	Kozármisleny	32	(1)
2012–2013	Senta		
2016–2017	Pécsváradi Spartacus	10	(9)
Total		202	(30)
- * Club domestic league appearances and goals

Attila Andruskó (Serbian: Атила Андрушко / Atila Andruško; born 12 October 1980) is a Serbian retired footballer who played as a midfielder.

== Career ==
After starting out at his hometown club Senta, Andruskó played regularly for Solunac Karađorđevo in the 2001–02 Second League of FR Yugoslavia. He subsequently moved to Hungary and joined Kaposvár. Between 2004 and 2006, Andruskó made 64 appearances and scored once in the top flight of Hungarian football.

In the summer of 2007, Andruskó switched to Slovenian club Primorje. He later moved back to Hungary and signed with Kaposvölgye in the summer of 2008.

In the summer of 2012, Andruskó returned to Serbia and joined his parent club Senta.
