= Gábor Bogdán =

Hungarian footballer

Personal information
- Date of birth: 30 August 1980 (age 46)
- Place of birth: Szarvas, Hungary
- Height: 1.80 m (5 ft 11 in)
- Position: Midfielder

Senior career*
Years	Team	Apps	(Gls)
2003–2006	Szarvas		
2006–2007	Békéscsaba	18	(4)
2007–2008	Szolnok	22	(2)
2008–2010	Kaposvár	32	(2)
2010–2012	Vasas	0	(0)
2010–2011	→ Békéscsaba (loan)	11	(1)
- * Club domestic league appearances and goals

Gábor Bogdán (born 30 August 1980) is a Hungarian former football player.
