= Ellis Samuel Ato =

Ghanaian footballer (born 1989)

Samuel Ato
Personal information
- Full name: Ellis Samuel Ato
- Date of birth: 29 April 1989 (age 37)
- Place of birth: Saltpond, Ghana
- Height: 1.70 m (5 ft 7 in)
- Position: Midfielder

Team information
- Current team: Dunaújváros
- Number: 8

Senior career*
Years	Team	Apps	(Gls)
2008–2009	Kaposvár	3	(0)
2009	→ Kaposvölgye (loan)	13	(2)
2009–2010	Győr II	14	(1)
2010–2011	Kaposvölgye	15	(2)
2011–2012	Pécs	3	(0)
2011–2012	→ Kozármisleny (loan)	11	(2)
2012–	Dunaújváros	31	(6)
- * Club domestic league appearances and goals as of 1 June 2014

Samuel Ato (born 29 April 1989 in Saltpond) is a Ghanaian football player who currently plays for Dunaújváros PASE.
