= Árpád Milinte =

Hungarian footballer (born 1976)

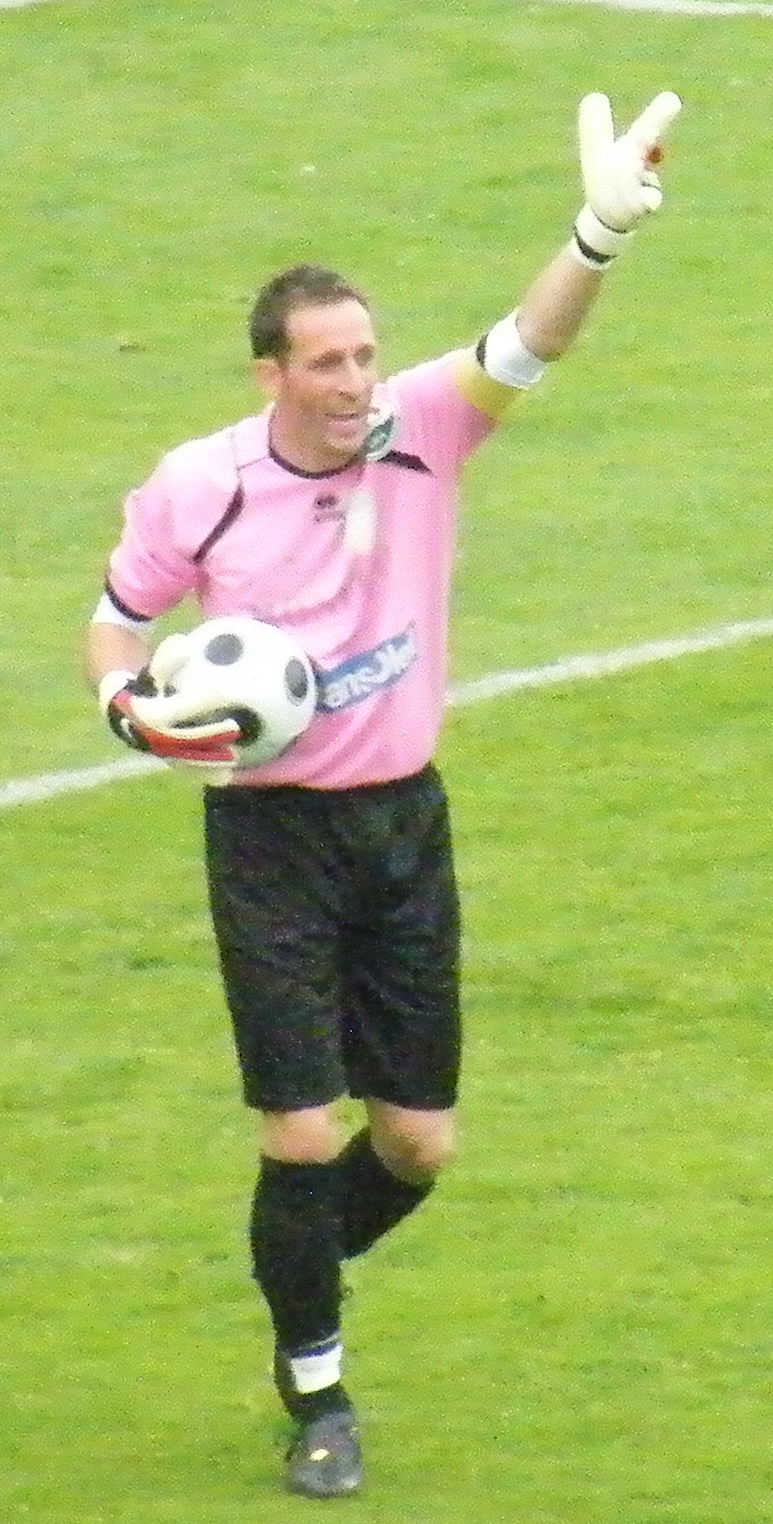

Personal information
- Full name: Árpád Milinte
- Date of birth: 4 May 1976 (age 50)
- Place of birth: Marcali, Hungary
- Height: 1.80 m (5 ft 11 in)
- Position: Goalkeeper

Team information
- Current team: Dunaújváros
- Number: 1

Senior career*
Years	Team	Apps	(Gls)
1996–1997	Kaposvár	24	(0)
1997–2003	Videoton	118	(0)
2003–2004	Sopron	22	(0)
2004–2005	Uniao Madeira	18	(0)
2005–2006	Zalaegerszeg	5	(0)
2006–2008	Kaposvár	56	(0)
2008–2009	Siófok	29	(0)
2009–2011	Kaposvár	35	(0)
2011–2012	Siófok	17	(0)
2012–	Dunaújváros	64	(0)

International career
1996–1997	Hungary U-21	1	(0)
- * Club domestic league appearances and goals as of 5 October 2014

Árpád Milinte (born 4 May 1976 in Marcali) is a Hungarian football (goalkeeper) player who currently plays for Pálhalma SE.
