= Béla Maróti =

Hungarian footballer

Personal information
- Full name: Béla Maróti
- Date of birth: 7 May 1979 (age 47)
- Place of birth: Veszprém, Hungary
- Height: 1.80 m (5 ft 11 in)
- Position: Midfielder

Team information
- Current team: Rákosmenti KSE
- Number: 25

Youth career
- 1993–1998: Veszprémi LC

Senior career*
Years	Team	Apps	(Gls)
1998–2000	Veszprémi LC	40	(7)
2000–2003	Vasas SC	22	(2)
2002	→ Csepel SC (loan)	?	(?)
2003	Veszprémi LC	8	(2)
2003–2004	Floridsdorfer FC	25	(5)
2004–2005	FC Kärnten	?	(?)
2005–2008	Kaposvári Rákóczi FC	95	(7)
2008–2009	Budapest Honvéd FC	26	(1)
2009–2010	Kaposvári Rákóczi FC	26	(6)
2010–2012	Ferencvárosi TC	47	(3)
2012–2013	Lombard-Pápa TFC	19	(2)
2015–	Rákosmenti KSE	0	(0)
- * Club domestic league appearances and goals as of 4 August 2015

Béla Maróti (born 7 May 1979 in Veszprém) is a Hungarian football player who currently plays for Lombard-Pápa TFC.
