= János Haraszti =

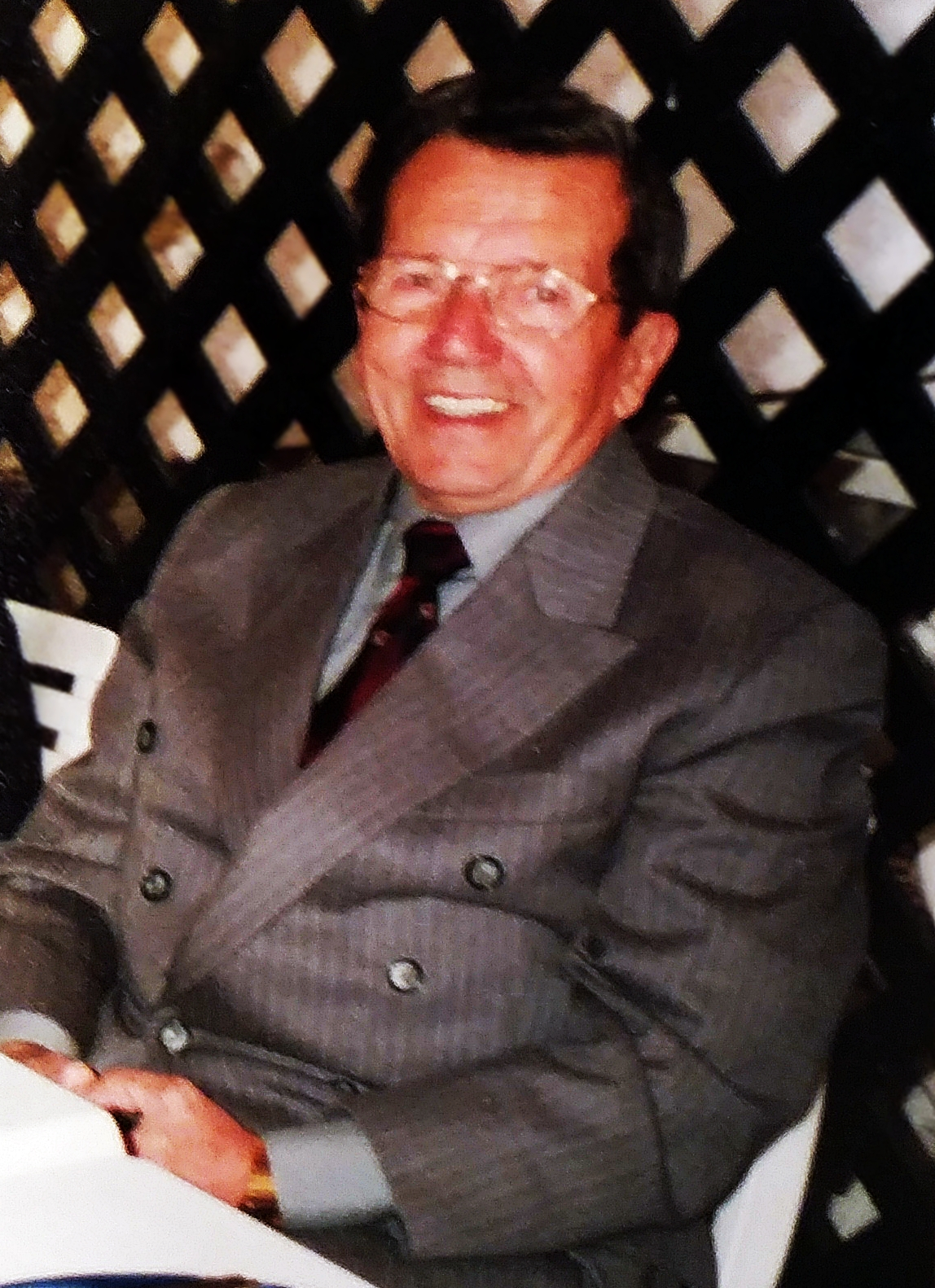
Dr. János Haraszti

János Haraszti, Dr. (Kaposvár, 29 October 1924 – Budapest, 22 October 2007) was a veterinarian, university teacher, and researcher. He used to be the key figure of Hungarian reproductive biology research. He became one of the first members of the Hungarian Academy of Sciences as a veterinarian. He was the Secretary of the Committee of Veterinary Medicine of the Hungarian Academy of Science and President of the Association of Hungarian Veterinarians.
