= Károly Graszl =

Hungarian footballer

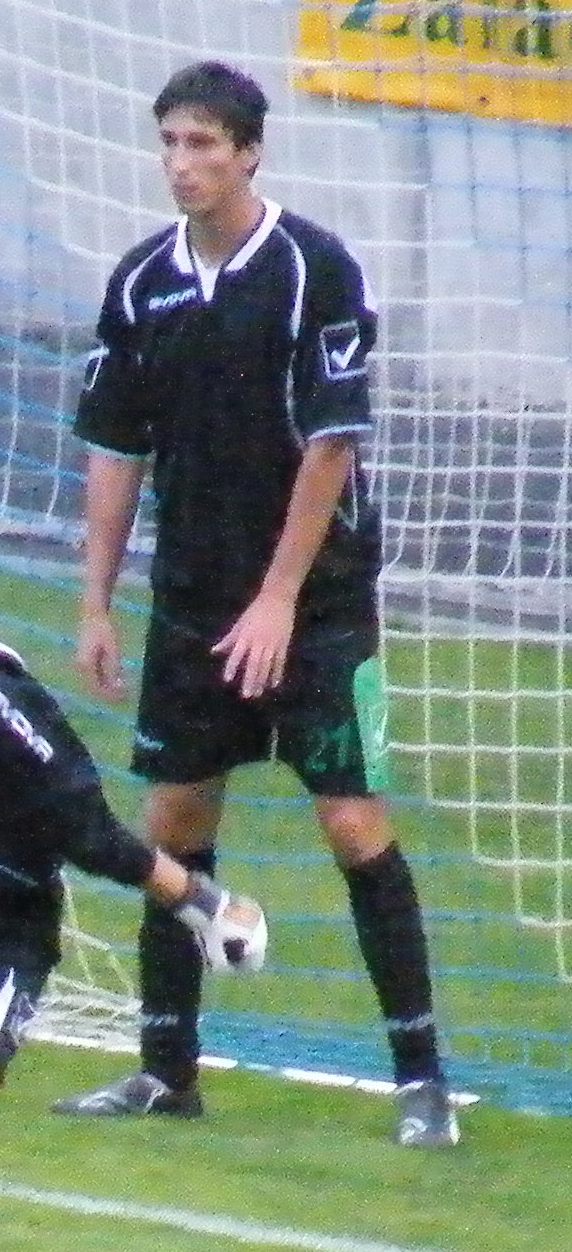

Personal information
- Full name: Károly Graszl
- Date of birth: 8 January 1985 (age 41)
- Place of birth: Balatonlelle, Hungary
- Height: 1.92 m (6 ft 3 1/2 in)
- Position: Defender

Team information
- Current team: Gyirmót
- Number: 28

Youth career
- 2002–2005: Balatonlelle

Senior career*
Years	Team	Apps	(Gls)
2005–2007	Balatonlelle	42	(1)
2007–2009	Kaposvár	36	(0)
2009–2011	Siófok	50	(2)
2011–2012	Kaposvár	19	(2)
2012–2013	Nea Salamis	26	(0)
2013–	Gyirmót	18	(0)
- * Club domestic league appearances and goals as of 27 May 2014

Károly Graszl (born 8 January 1985, in Balatonlelle) is a Hungarian football player who currently plays for Gyirmót SE.
