= Nemanja Obrić =

Serbian footballer

Personal information
- Full name: Nemanja Obrić
- Date of birth: 15 April 1984 (age 42)
- Place of birth: Sombor, SFR Yugoslavia
- Height: 1.84 m (6 ft 1/2 in)
- Position: Midfielder

Youth career
- Red Star Belgrade

Senior career*
Years	Team	Apps	(Gls)
2003–2005	Vrbas	43	(8)
2005–2007	Spartak Subotica	21	(2)
2007–2008	Mladost Apatin	5	(0)
2007–2009	Kaposvár Rákóczi	39	(3)
2009–2010	Red Star Belgrade	0	(0)
2010	→ Mladi Radnik (loan)	6	(0)
2010	Haladás	3	(0)
2011	Al-Hazem	6	(1)
2011–2012	Mitra Kukar	15	(6)
2012–2013	Pelita Bandung Raya	7	(1)
2016–2017	Stanišić	7	(3)
Total		152	(24)
- * Club domestic league appearances and goals

Nemanja Obrić (Serbian Cyrillic: Немања Обрић; born 15 April 1984) is a Serbian retired football midfielder.

He previously played in Indonesia with Pelita Bandung Raya on Indonesia Super League. Before moving to Indonesia, he had played in several clubs in Serbia, Hungary, and Saudi Arabia. He also had his youth career as a footballer in Red Star Belgrade even though he never played a match in his senior career with the club.
