= Krisztián Zahorecz =

Hungarian footballer (1975–2019)

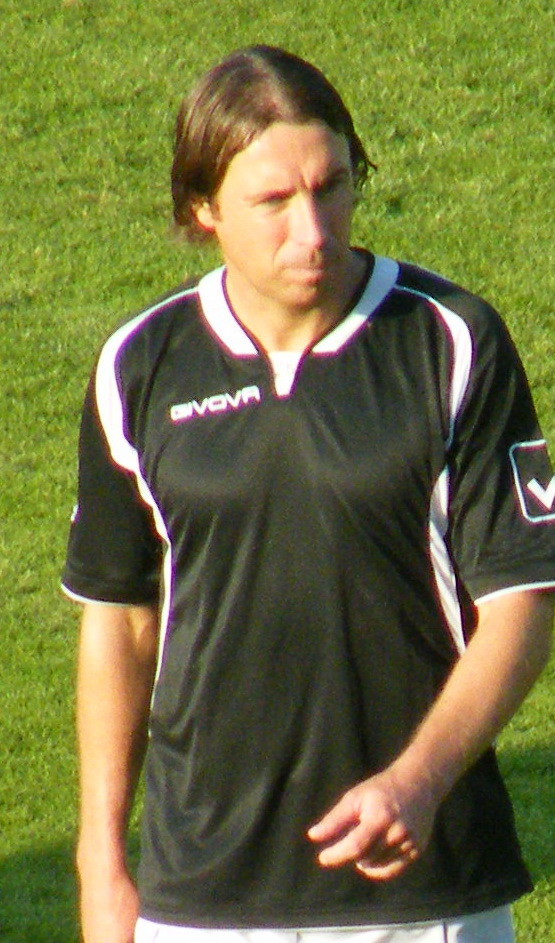

Personal information
- Full name: Krisztián Zahorecz
- Date of birth: 28 October 1975
- Place of birth: Szarvas, Hungary
- Date of death: 21 December 2019 (aged 44)
- Height: 1.87 m (6 ft 1 1/2 in)
- Position: Defender

Senior career*
Years	Team	Apps	(Gls)
1998–1999	Kaposvári Rákóczi FC	18	(1)
1999–2001	Nagykanizsai SC	35	(1)
2000	→ Debreceni VSC (loan)	7	(0)
2001–2002	Egri FC	?	(?)
2002–2003	Szolnoki MÁV FC	26	(5)
2003–2004	Kecskeméti TE	?	(?)
2004–2011	Kaposvári Rákóczi FC	170	(35)
2011	Bajai LSE	8	(0)
- * Club domestic league appearances and goals as of 4 August 2015

Krisztián Zahorecz (28 October 1975 – 21 December 2019) was a Hungarian football player. He was born in Szarvas.
