= Rákóczi Stadion =

Sports venue in Kaposvár, Hungary

Coordinates: 46°21′24″N 17°48′22″E

- Interactive map of Rákóczi Stadion
- Location: Kaposvár, Hungary
- Owner: Kaposvári Rákóczi FC
- Capacity: 6,150
- Surface: Grass; Field
- Field size: 105 m × 68 m (344 ft × 223 ft)

Construction
- Groundbreaking: 2003
- Built: 2003–2004
- Opened: 2004

Tenant
- Kaposvári Rákóczi FC

Website
- Official website

Rákóczi Stadion is a multi-use stadium in Kaposvár, Hungary. It is currently used mostly for football matches and is the home stadium of Kaposvári Rákóczi FC. The stadium is able to hold 7,000 people. It has 4,500 seats.
