= Zoltán Kovács (footballer, born 1984) =

Hungarian footballer

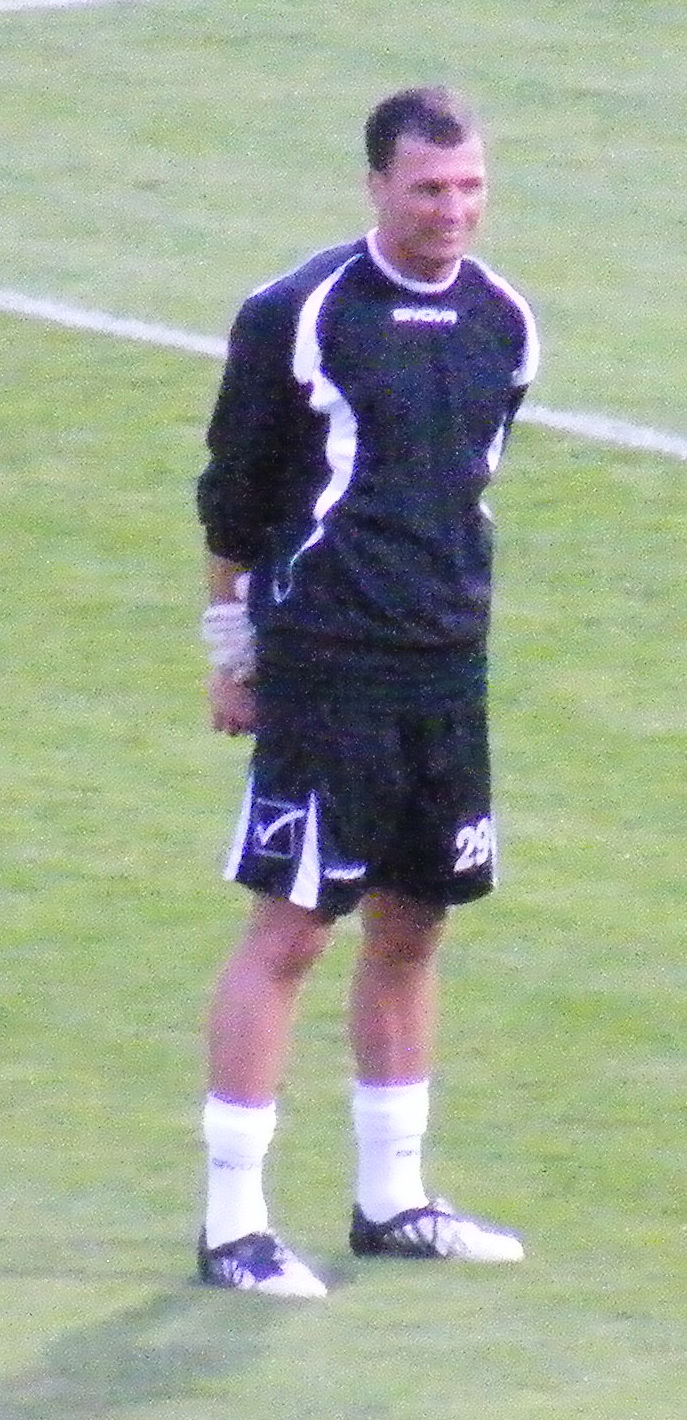

Personal information
- Date of birth: 29 October 1984 (age 42)
- Place of birth: Medgyesegyháza, Hungary
- Height: 1.91 m (6 ft 3 in)
- Position: Goalkeeper

Youth career
- 1998–2002: MTK Budapest

Senior career*
Years	Team	Apps	(Gls)
2002–2010	MTK Budapest	1	(0)
2002–2003	→ BFC Siófok (loan)	15	(0)
2004–2006	→ BFC Siófok (loan)	45	(0)
2006–2009	→ Kaposvár (loan)	26	(0)
2009–2010	→ Diósgyőri VTK (loan)	9	(0)
2010–2011	Kaposvár	24	(0)
2011–2012	Aris Limassol	22	(0)
2012–2013	Nea Salamis	13	(0)
2013–2014	Aris Limassol	11	(0)
2014	Dinamo București	0	(0)
2015–2018	Újpest	3	(0)
2018–2020	Zalaegerszeg	17	(0)
2018–2019	→ Vasas (loan)	0	(0)
2019–2020	→ Budafok (loan)	24	(0)
2020–2021	Budafok	2	(0)
2021–2022	Ypsonas	22	(0)
- * Club domestic league appearances and goals as of 20:45, 18 May 2023 (UTC)

Zoltán Kovács (born 29 October 1984) is a Hungarian football player.
