= Tamás Grúz =

Hungarian footballer

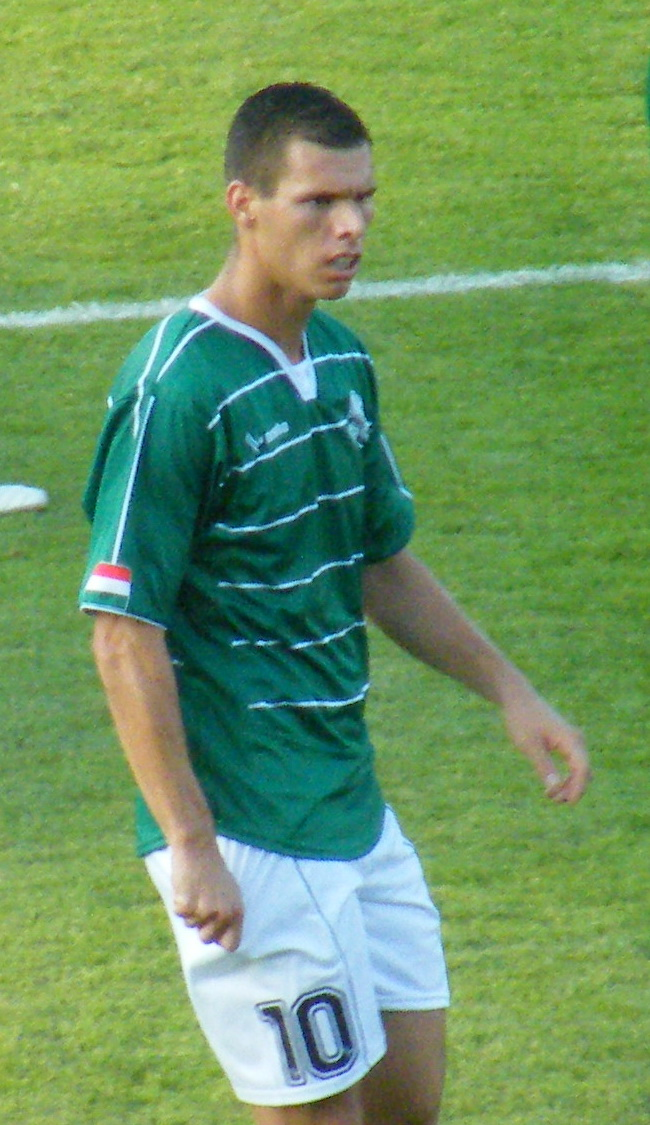

Personal information
- Full name: Tamás Grúz
- Date of birth: 8 November 1985 (age 40)
- Place of birth: Salgótarján, Hungary
- Height: 1.85 m (6 ft 1 in)
- Position: Centre-back

Team information
- Current team: Unione FC
- Number: 14

Youth career
- 1999–2003: Salgótarján
- 2003–2004: Magyargéc

Senior career*
Years	Team	Apps	(Gls)
2004–2005	Békéscsaba	8	(1)
2005–2006	Szolnok	24	(2)
2006–2011	Kaposvár	122	(6)
2011–2014	Ferencváros	19	(2)
2013–2014	→ Szolnok (loan)	22	(2)
2014–2016	Vasas	55	(4)
2016–2017	Budafok	29	(1)
2017–2018	III. Kerület	28	(0)
2018–	Unione FC	69	(8)
- * Club domestic league appearances and goals as of 19:25, 6 February 2022 (UTC)

Tamás Grúz (born 8 November 1985) is a Hungarian football player who currently plays for Unione FC.
