= Krisztián Pest =

Hungarian footballer

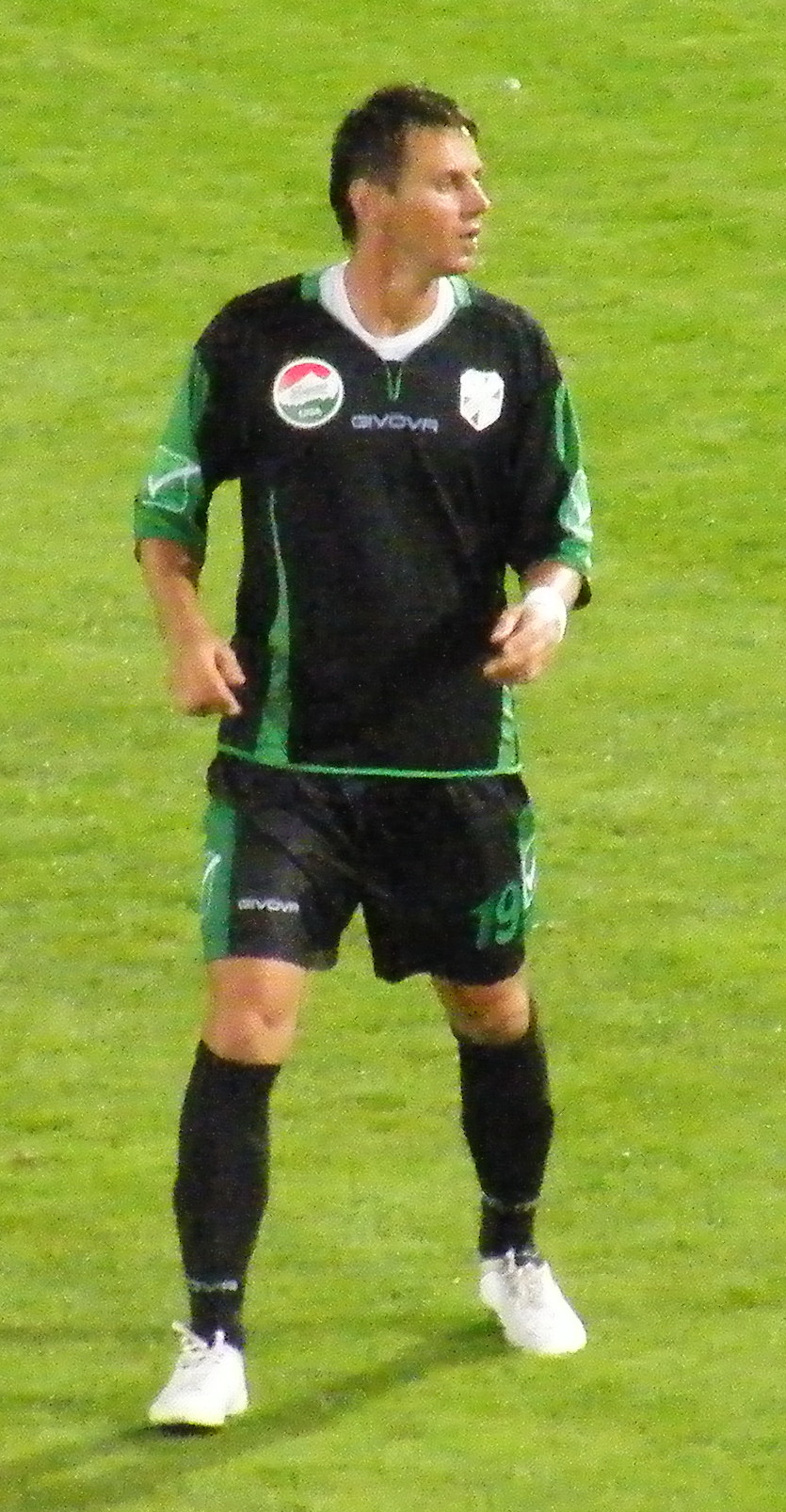

Personal information
- Date of birth: 7 July 1975 (age 51)
- Place of birth: Mohács, Hungary
- Height: 1.81 m (5 ft 11 1/2 in)
- Position: Midfielder

Team information
- Current team: SV Neumarkt/Pötting

Senior career*
Years	Team	Apps	(Gls)
1993–1994	Kaposvári Rákóczi FC	0	(0)
1994–1995	Komlói Bányász	13	(3)
1995–1996	Mohácsi TE	32	(6)
1996–1997	Komlói Bányász SK	?	(?)
1997–2000	BFC Siófok	68	(10)
2000–2002	Újpest FC	20	(0)
2002–2005	Pécsi Mecsek FC	85	(26)
2005–2006	APOP Kinyras Peyias FC	22	(2)
2006–2007	Pécsi Mecsek FC	23	(5)
2007–2010	Kaposvári Rákóczi FC	65	(0)
2010–	SV Neumarkt/Pötting	?	(?)

International career
2003	Hungary	1	(0)
- * Club domestic league appearances and goals as of 11 July 2012

Krisztián Pest (born 7 June 1975 in Mohács) is a Hungarian football player who currently plays for SV Neumarkt/Pötting.
