= Attila Pintér (footballer, born 1978) =

Hungarian footballer

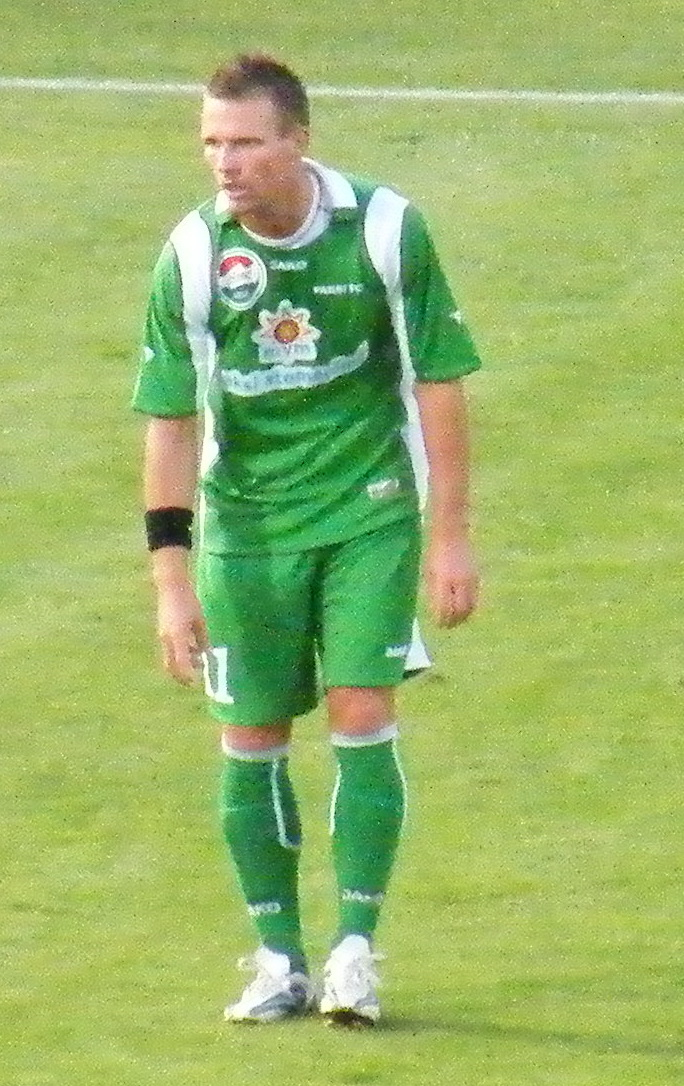

Personal information
- Full name: Attila Pintér
- Date of birth: 8 September 1978 (age 48)
- Place of birth: Hungary
- Height: 1.78 m (5 ft 10 in)
- Position: Defender

Team information
- Current team: Pécsi Mecsek FC
- Number: 8

Senior career*
Years	Team	Apps	(Gls)
2002–2003	Kecskeméti TE	17	(0)
2003–2004	BKV Előre SC		
2004–2005	Nyíregyháza Spartacus	17	(0)
2005–2008	Kaposvári Rákóczi FC	54	(2)
2008–2009	Győri ETO FC	6	(0)
2009–2010	Paksi SE	18	(1)
2010–2012	Pécsi Mecsek FC	49	(3)
2012	→ Kozármisleny SE (loan)	11	(0)
- * Club domestic league appearances and goals as of 30 June 2012

Attila Pintér (born 8 September 1978) is a Hungarian football player who currently plays for Pécsi Mecsek FC.
