= Zoltán Farkas (footballer) =

Hungarian footballer

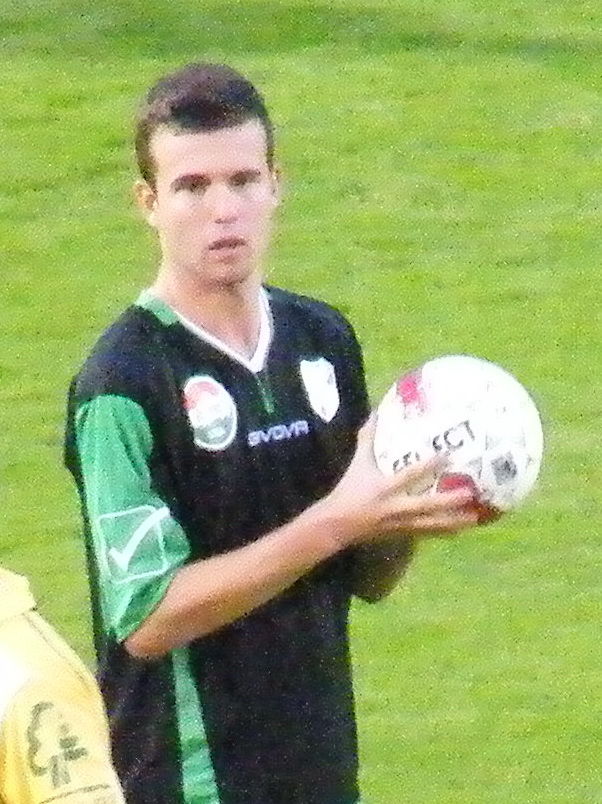
- Zoltán Farkas Hungarian football player

Personal information
- Full name: Zoltán Farkas
- Date of birth: 7 October 1989 (age 37)
- Place of birth: Marcali, Hungary
- Height: 1.85 m (6 ft 1 in)
- Position: Midfielder

Team information
- Current team: Kozármisleny
- Number: 20

Youth career
- 2003–2007: Kaposvár

Senior career*
Years	Team	Apps	(Gls)
2007–2011	Kaposvár	36	(0)
2011–2012	Vasas	3	(0)
2012–2013	Szeged	29	(1)
2013–2014	Kozármisleny	8	(0)
- * Club domestic league appearances and goals as of 20 October 2013

Zoltán Farkas (born 7 October 1989 in Marcali) is a Hungarian football player who last played for Kozármisleny SE.
