= Bojan Božović (footballer) =

Montenegrin association football player (born 1985)

Personal information
- Full name: Bojan Božović
- Date of birth: 3 February 1985 (age 41)
- Place of birth: Titograd, SFR Yugoslavia
- Height: 1.92 m (6 ft 4 in)
- Position: Striker

Youth career
- Budućnost Podgorica

Senior career*
| Years | Team | Apps | (Gls) |
| 2002–2003 | Kom | | |
| 2003–2004 | Hajduk Beograd | 0 | (0) |
| 2003–2004 | → BPI Pekar (loan) | | |
| 2004–2005 | Békéscsaba | 11 | (1) |
| 2005–2006 | Honvéd | 3 | (0) |
| 2006–2009 | Kaposvár | 37 | (5) |
| 2009–2011 | Cercle Brugge | 24 | (2) |
| 2011–2012 | Siófok | 9 | (0) |
| 2012 | → Honvéd (loan) | 5 | (0) |
| 2012 | Hajduk Beograd | 1 | (0) |
| 2013 | Chainat | 4 | (1) |
| 2013 | Bežanija | 11 | (5) |
| 2014 | Napredak Kruševac | 21 | (8) |
| 2015 | Al-Shoulla | 11 | (1) |
| 2015 | Spartak Subotica | 2 | (0) |
| 2016 | Manama Club | | |
| 2016–2020 | Sutjeska Nikšić | 98 | (22) |
- * Club domestic league appearances and goals

Bojan Božović (Cyrillic: Бојан Божовић; born 3 February 1985) is a Montenegrin retired professional footballer who played as a striker. The last club he played for on a professional level was FK Sutjeska Nikšić.

== Club career ==
He started playing with FK Kom from where he moved to Belgrade to join FK Hajduk Beograd but spend most of the time playing on loan at FK BPI Pekar.

Due to a broken foot, Božović missed a transfer to Hamburg during the winter break of the 2008-09 season. He signed a two-year contract with Belgian Jupiler League side Cercle Brugge in June 2009. His former teams are the Montenegrin FK Kom, Serbian FK Hajduk Beograd and Hungarian teams Békéscsaba Előre, Budapest Honvéd and Kaposvári Rákóczi.

He scored his first goal for Cercle against Lokeren on 17 October 2009: an equalizer (1-1) in the last minute of injury time. 27 October, Božović made both goals in the 2-0 cup victory against OH Leuven and went on to score two winning goals against R.S.C. Anderlecht helping Cercle to reach the cup final. He finished as top scorer of Belgium cup 2009–10. In preseason 2010-11 he was told by the board of Cercle Brugge that he had to leave the club. He didn't find a team to play in before closing of the transfer period and was dropped out of the first team squad. He played a whole year with the reserve squad before moving to Hungarian team BFC Siófok.

In summer 2012 he returned to Serbia joining his former club FK Hajduk Beograd, playing now in the Serbian League Belgrade.

During the first half of 2013 he played with Chainat in Thailand, and in summer 2013 he returned to Serbia and joined FK Bežanija. During the winter break of the 2013–14 season he moved to a Serbian SuperLiga side FK Napredak Kruševac.

During the winter break of the 2014–15 season, a year after joining Napredak, he moved to Saudi Arabia and joined Al-Shoalah.

== International career ==
Bojan Božović has been a youth international. He has already been called up to represent Montenegro at senior level, but has no appearances so far.
