= Róbert Kovácsevics =

Hungarian footballer

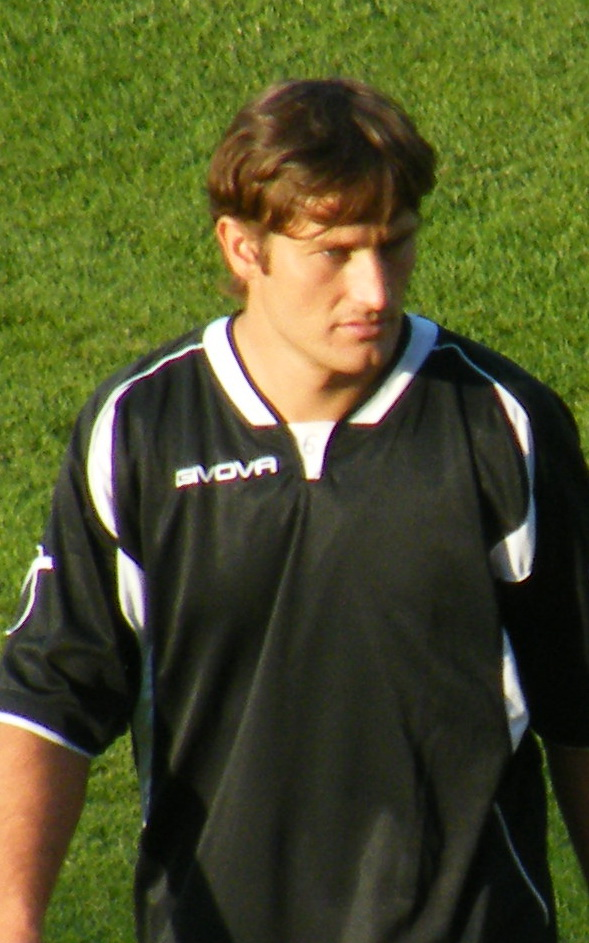

Personal information
- Full name: Róbert Kovácsevics
- Date of birth: 19 March 1979 (age 47)
- Place of birth: Sellye, Hungary
- Height: 1.79 m (5 ft 10 in)
- Position: Defender

Team information
- Current team: Drogheda United F.C.

Senior career*
| Years | Team | Apps | (Gls) |
| 1996–2000 | Pécsi Mecsek FC | 27 | (3) |
| 2000–2002 | Marcali VFC | ? | (?) |
| 2002–2010 | Kaposvári Rákóczi FC | 140 | (5) |
| 2011– | Drogheda United | 2 | (0) |
- * Club domestic league appearances and goals as of 6 November 2010

Róbert Kovácsevics (born 19 March 1979 in Sellye) is a Hungarian football player who currently plays for Drogheda United F.C.

He signed for Drogheda in March 2011 and made his League of Ireland debut in a 4–0 loss to Shamrock Rovers on 1 April .
