= Róbert Waltner =

Hungarian footballer (born 1977)

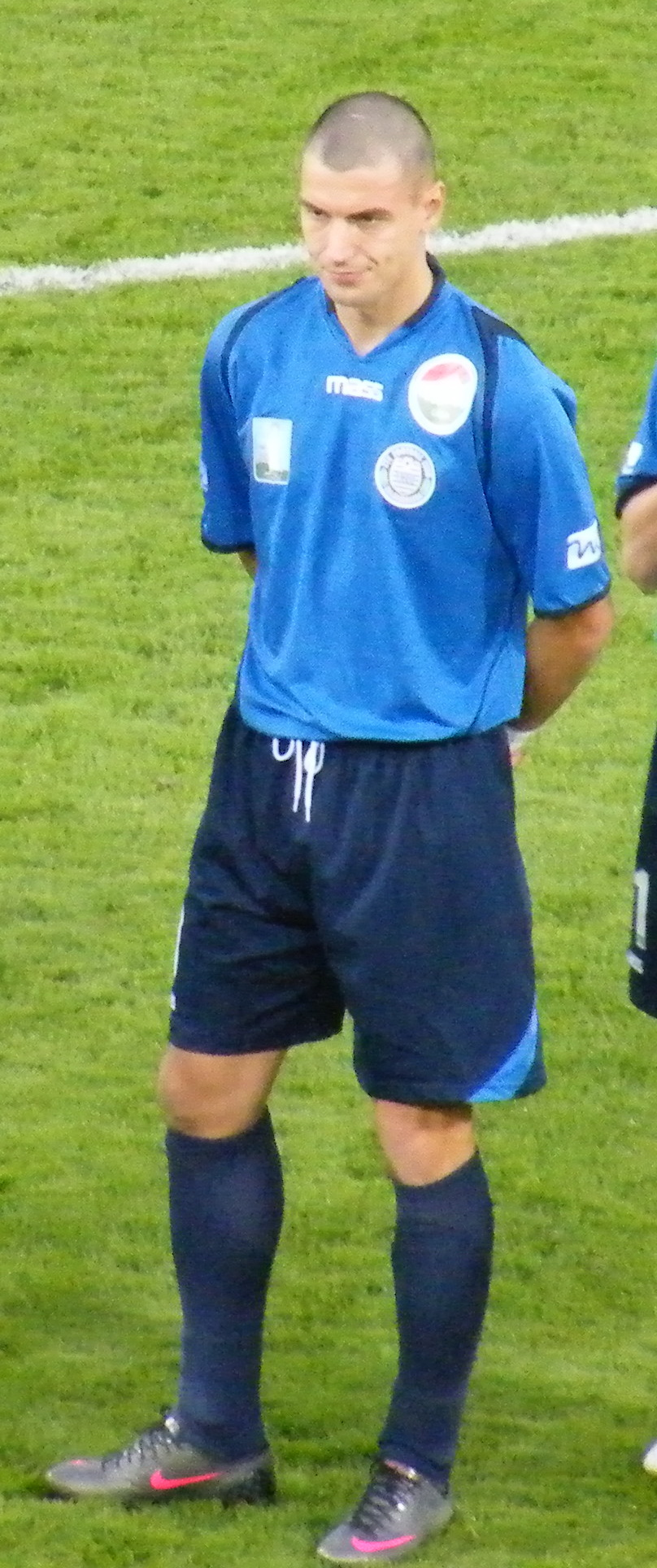

Personal information
- Date of birth: 20 September 1977 (age 49)
- Place of birth: Kaposvár, Hungary
- Height: 1.84 m (6 ft 0 in)
- Position: Forward

Senior career*
Years	Team	Apps	(Gls)
1995–1996	Kaposfő	15	(6)
1997–1998	Kaposvár	29	(7)
1998–1999	Videoton	32	(12)
1999–2000	Újpest	13	(3)
2000–2002	Zalaegerszeg	70	(29)
2002–2003	Boca Juniors	0	(0)
2003–2004	Anorthosis	5	(1)
2004–2005	Zalaegerszeg	30	(17)
2005–2006	Vasas	39	(5)
2006–2009	Zalaegerszeg	71	(46)
2007–2008	→ Al Dhafra (loan)	13	(9)
2009–2012	Mattersburg	68	(18)
2012–2014	Kaposvár	31	(9)
2014	Siófok	4	(0)
2014–2015	Pápa	17	(1)
2016	Balatonlelle	5	(5)

International career
1998–1999	Hungary U21	5	(1)
1998–2004	Hungary	6	(0)

Managerial career
- 2017–2020: Kaposvár
- 2020–2021: Siófok
- 2021–2022: Zalaegerszeg
- 2022–2023: Paks
- * Club domestic league appearances and goals

Róbert Waltner (born 20 September 1977) is a Hungarian football coach and a former player.

== Playing career ==
Waltner was a forward during his playing career, and is most remembered for representing Zalaegerszeg during three different spells and is the club's all-time top scorer with 92 league goals.

He was part of the Zalaegerszeg side that won the club's first league title in the 2001–02 season, under manager Péter Bozsik. In the third qualifying round of the 2002–03 UEFA Champions League, Waltner was part of the Zalaegerszeg squad that faced English giants Manchester United. In the first leg, ZTE provided a stunning shock by winning 1–0 with a last minute goal from Béla Koplárovics.

== Coaching career ==
Waltner resigned as a head coach of Zalaegerszeg on 25 March 2022.

On 26 May 2022, he was appointed as the coach of Paks. On 13 February 2023, he was sacked from Paks.

== Honours ==
Zalaegerszegi

- Nemzeti Bajnokság I: 2001–02
- Szuperkupa runner-up: 2002

Boca Juniors

- Copa Libertadores: 2003
- Intercontinental Cup: 2003

Individual

- Nemzeti Bajnokság I Top Scorer: 2007–08
