= László Horváth (footballer, born 1988) =

Hungarian footballer

Personal information
- Full name: László Horváth
- Date of birth: 23 February 1988 (age 38)
- Place of birth: Kaposvár, Hungary
- Height: 1.87 m (6 ft 1 1/2 in)
- Position: Goalkeeper

Youth career
- 2005–2007: Kaposvár

Senior career*
Years	Team	Apps	(Gls)
2007–2013	Kaposvár	12	(0)
2010	→ Kaposvölgye (loan)	11	(0)
2013–2015	Szigetszentmiklós	46	(0)
2015–2018	Balmazújváros	61	(0)
2018–2019	MTK Budapest	8	(0)
2019–2021	Kazincbarcika	53	(0)
- * Club domestic league appearances and goals

László Horváth (born 23 February 1988) is a Hungarian former football player.

== Career statistics ==
Appearances and goals by club, season and competition
Club	Season	League			Cup		League Cup		Europe		Total	
Club	Season	Division	Apps	Goals	Apps	Goals	Apps	Goals	Apps	Goals	Apps	Goals
Kaposvár
Kaposvár	2007–08	Nemzeti Bajnokság I	1	0	0	0	3	0	—		4	0
Kaposvár	2008–09	Nemzeti Bajnokság I	8	0	2	0	5	0	—		15	0
Kaposvár	2009–10	Nemzeti Bajnokság I	0	0	0	0	9	0	—		9	0
Kaposvár	2010–11	Nemzeti Bajnokság I	1	0	0	0	0	0	—		1	0
Kaposvár	2011–12	Nemzeti Bajnokság I	2	0	4	0	2	0	—		8	0
Kaposvár	2012–13	Nemzeti Bajnokság I	1	0	0	0	4	0	—		5	0
Kaposvár	Total		12	0	6	0	23	0	0	0	41	0
Kaposvölgye	2010–11	Nemzeti Bajnokság II	11	0	0	0	—		—		11	0
Szigetszentmiklós
Szigetszentmiklós	2012–13	Nemzeti Bajnokság II	11	0	0	0	—		—		11	0
Szigetszentmiklós	2013–14	Nemzeti Bajnokság II	10	0	1	0	6	0	—		17	0
Szigetszentmiklós	2014–15	Nemzeti Bajnokság II	25	0	0	0	1	0	—		26	0
Szigetszentmiklós	Total		46	0	1	0	7	0	0	0	54	0
Balmazújváros
Balmazújváros	2015–16	Nemzeti Bajnokság II	14	0	2	0	—		—		16	0
Balmazújváros	2016–17	Nemzeti Bajnokság II	26	0	0	0	—		—		26	0
Balmazújváros	2017–18	Nemzeti Bajnokság I	22	0	1	0	—		—		23	0
Balmazújváros	Total		62	0	3	0	0	0	0	0	65	0
MTK Budapest	2017–18	Nemzeti Bajnokság I	8	0	2	0	—		—		10	0
Career total			139	0	12	0	30	0	0	0	181	0

Updated to games played as of 19 May 2019.
