= Viktor Petrók (footballer, born 1981) =

Hungarian footballer

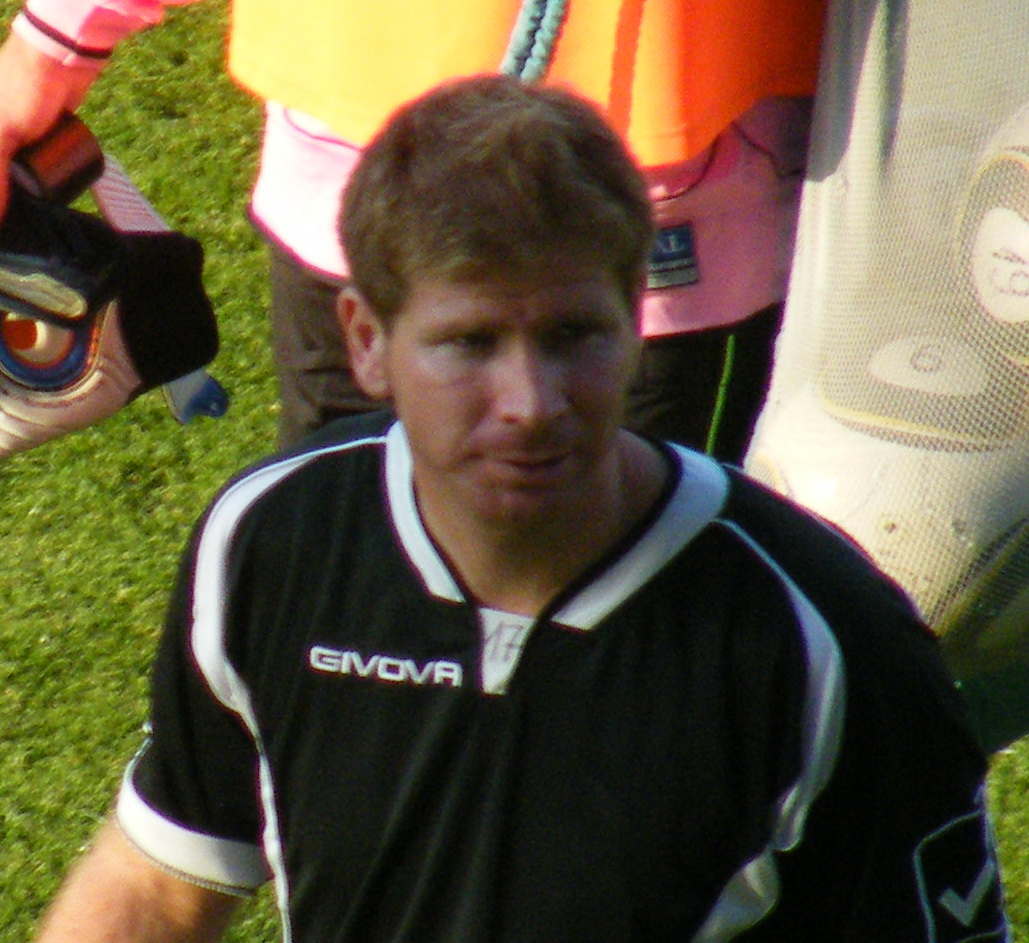
- Petrók Viktor in 2010

Personal information
- Date of birth: 3 April 1981 (age 45)
- Place of birth: Kaposvár, Hungary
- Height: 1.85 m (6 ft 1 in)
- Position: Defender

Youth career
- 1995–1998: Kaposvár

Senior career*
Years	Team	Apps	(Gls)
1998–2011	Kaposvár	195	(0)
1998	→ Dunaújváros (loan)	0	(0)
2001	→ Siófok (loan)		
2011	Kozármisleny	13	(1)
2011–2012	Pécs	3	(1)
2012	SV Bad Schallerbach	13	(0)
2012–2013	Szeged	23	(4)
2013–2014	Nagyatá	15	(0)
2014–2015	Kozármisleny	14	(1)
2015–2016	Kaposvár	17	(3)
2017	SV Oberwart		
2017–2018	Dombóvár		

Managerial career
- 2017–2019: Kaposvár (assistant)
- * Club domestic league appearances and goals

Viktor Petrók (born 3 April 1981) is a Hungarian football coach and a former player.

== Bibliography ==
- HLSZ
- Kaposvári Rákóczi FC official site
