= Gábor Reszli =

Hungarian footballer

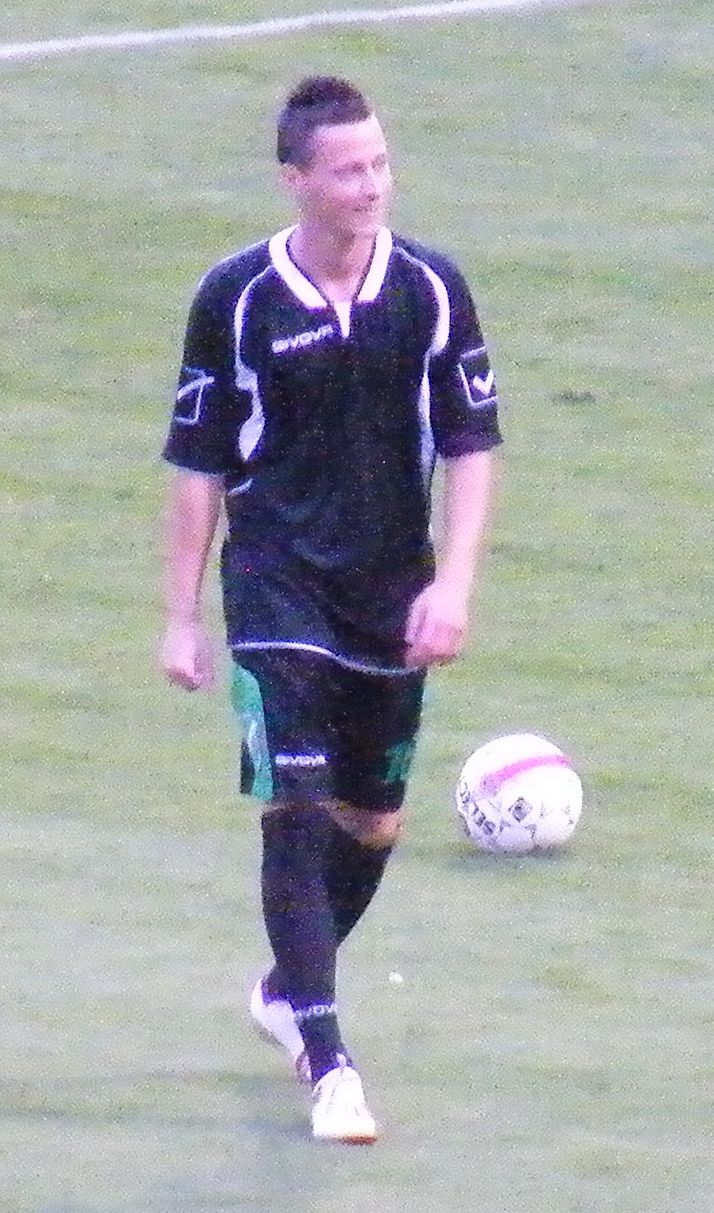
- Reszli in 2009.

Personal information
- Full name: Gábor Reszli
- Date of birth: 20 January 1988 (age 38)
- Place of birth: Kaposvár, Hungary
- Height: 1.80 m (5 ft 11 in)
- Position: Forward

Team information
- Current team: Kaposvári Rákóczi FC
- Number: 16

Youth career
- 2002–2007: Kaposvári Rákóczi FC

Senior career*
Years	Team	Apps	(Gls)
2007–	Kaposvári Rákóczi FC	20	(3)
- * Club domestic league appearances and goals as of 23 May 2010

Gábor Reszli (born 20 January 1988 in Kaposvár) is a Hungarian football player who currently plays for Kaposvári Rákóczi FC.
