= 2010–11 Ferencvárosi TC season =

Ferencvárosi TC
2010–11 season
- Chairman: Kevin McCabe
- Manager: László Prukner
- NB 1: 3rd
- Magyar Kupa: 5th Round
- Ligakupa: Group Stage
- Top goalscorer: League: André Schembri (16); All: André Schembri (17)
- Highest home attendance: 10,000 vs Győri ETO FC (1 September 2010); 10,000 vs Videoton FC Fehérvár (12 March 2011); 10,000 vs Újpest FC (1 April 2011)
- Lowest home attendance: 1,200 vs Szombathelyi Haladás (3 November 2010)

The 2010–11 season was Ferencvárosi TC's 108th competitive season, 2nd consecutive season in the Soproni Liga and 111th year in existence as a football club.

== Team kit and logo ==
The team kits for the 2010–11 season are produced by Nike and the shirt sponsor is Fantastic League. The home kit is green and white colour and the away kit is white colour. The third kit is green colour.

Home	Away	Third

== Club ==
=== Coaching staff ===
Position	Staff
Manager	(Hungary) László Prukner
Assistant managers	(Hungary) Tamás Nagy
Assistant managers	(Hungary) Péter Lipcsei
First team fitness coach	(Hungary) Péter Bali
Goalkeeping coach	(Hungary) László Kakas
Club doctor	(Hungary) Dr. Jenő Gyarmati
Masseur	(Hungary) Péter Czakó
Masseur	(Hungary) László Eisemann
Masseur	(Hungary) Gábor Lipcsei
Youth team manager	(Hungary) Flórián Albert, Jr.
Academy manager	(Hungary) Frigyes Tuboly

Last updated: 4 August 2010

=== Other information ===
General Manager	(Hungary) Zoltán Berkes
Technical Leader	(Hungary) Ferenc Haáz
Ground (capacity and dimensions)	Stadion Albert Flórián (18,100 / 105x68 meters)

Updated to match played 4 August 2010

== Squad ==
=== First team squad ===
Note: Flags indicate national team as defined under FIFA eligibility rules; some limited exceptions apply. Players may hold more than one non-FIFA nationality.

No.	Pos.	Nation	Player
1	GK	SLO	Marko Ranilović
5	DF	BRA	Adriano
7	FW	MKD	Nikola Jakimovski
8	MF	HUN	György Józsi
10	MF	BRA	Andrezinho
13	DF	BRA	Junior
14	MF	SRB	Srđan Stanić
15	DF	SRB	Đorđe Tutorić
18	FW	CZE	Marek Heinz
19	FW	SOM	Liban Abdi
20	MF	HUN	Dénes Rósa (vice-captain)
21	FW	BIH	Emil Miljiković

No.	Pos.	Nation	Player
22	DF	HUN	István Rodenbücher
23	GK	MLT	Justin Haber
25	MF	HUN	Béla Maróti
26	MF	HUN	Attila Dragóner
27	MF	MLT	André Schembri
30	MF	HUN	Bence Tóth
32	DF	ENG	Sam Stockley
35	MF	ARG	Héctor Gabriel Morales
60	FW	HUN	Péter Pölöskey
78	DF	HUN	Zoltán Balog
85	DF	HUN	Csaba Csizmadia
88	MF	HUN	Dávid Kulcsár

=== League cup squad ===
Note: Flags indicate national team as defined under FIFA eligibility rules; some limited exceptions apply. Players may hold more than one non-FIFA nationality.

No.	Pos.	Nation	Player
4	DF	HUN	Dániel Sváb
9	MF	HUN	Máté Papp
11	MF	HUN	Patrik Nagy
14	MF	HUN	Roland Szabó
15	MF	HUN	Valentin Berdó
17	FW	HUN	Viktor Bölcsföldi
21	FW	LTU	Valdas Trakys
22	DF	HUN	István Rodenbücher

No.	Pos.	Nation	Player
24	MF	HUN	Bálint Nyilasi
28	GK	HUN	Tamás Mester
29	DF	HUN	Noel Fülöp
33	DF	HUN	Balázs Vattai
36	FW	CAN	Igor Pisanjuk
60	FW	HUN	Péter Pölöskey
90	MF	HUN	Viktor Peszmeg
91	FW	HUN	István Kovács

== Transfers ==
=== Summer ===
In:

No.	Pos.	Nation	Player
1	GK	SLO	Marko Ranilović (from (Slovenia) NK Maribor)
5	DF	BRA	Adriano (from (Brazil) Goiás EC)
7	FW	MKD	Nikola Jakimovski (from (North Macedonia) FK Makedonija)
8	MF	HUN	György Józsi (from (Hungary) Győri ETO FC)
9	FW	NED	Frank Wiafe Danquah (from (England) Newcastle)
10	MF	BRA	Andrezinho (from (Brazil) Grêmio EC)
11	MF	HUN	Patrik Nagy (on loan from (Austria) SK Rapid Wien)
13	DF	BRA	Junior (from (Hungary) Kaposvári Rákóczi FC)
14	MF	SRB	Srđan Stanić (from (Hungary) Kaposvári Rákóczi FC)
18	FW	CZE	Marek Heinz (from (Austria) Kapfenberger SV)
21	FW	BIH	Emil Miljikovic (from (Slovenia) Nafta Levanda)
22	DF	HUN	István Rodenbücher (from (Hungary) MTK Budapest)
25	MF	HUN	Bela Maróti (from (Hungary) Kaposvári Rákóczi FC)
28	GK	HUN	Tamás Mester (from (Hungary) Kozármisleny SE)
35	MF	ARG	Héctor Gabriel Morales (on loan from (England) Sheffield)
36	FW	CAN	Igor Pisanjuk (from (Hungary) Szolnoki MÁV FC)
—	MF	HUN	István Makai (on loan from (Hungary) Nyíregyháza)
—	MF	ARG	Ianni Verón (on loan from (Argentina) Estudiantes)

Out:

No.	Pos.	Nation	Player
3	DF	ESP	Joaquín Martínez (to (Spain) Pontevedra CF)
5	DF	ESP	Carlos Alcántara (to (Spain) Alicante CF)
6	MF	HUN	Péter Lipcsei (retired)
7	MF	PAK	Adnan Ahmed (to (Iran) F.C. Aboomoslem)
9	FW	ENG	Anthony Elding (to (England) Rochdale AFC)
10	FW	ENG	Paul Shaw (retired)
13	FW	HUN	István Ferenczi (to (Hungary) Vasas SC)
14	MF	NIR	Tommy Doherty (to (England) Bradford City F.C.)
25	FW	JAM	Jason Morrison (to (Norway) Strømsgodset IF)
33	FW	SRB	Bojan Mamić (to (Serbia) FK Mladi Radnik)
36	FW	CAN	Igor Pisanjuk (on loan to (Hungary) Szolnoki MÁV)
39	DF	JAM	Rafe Wolfe (to (Jamaica) Portmore United F.C.)
42	GK	HUN	Balázs Megyeri (to (Greece) Olympiacos)

=== Winter ===
In:

No.	Pos.	Nation	Player
16	FW	HUN	Bence Varga (from (Germany) VfB Stuttgart II)
36	FW	CAN	Igor Pisanjuk (loan return from (Hungary) Szolnoki MÁV FC)

Out:

No.	Pos.	Nation	Player
5	DF	BRA	Adriano (on loan to (Brazil) Oeste FC)
7	FW	MKD	Nikola Jakimovski (on loan to (North Macedonia) FK Teteks)
9	FW	NED	Frank Wiafe Danquah (to (Belgium) Waasland-Beveren)
11	MF	HUN	Patrik Nagy (loan return to (Austria) SK Rapid Wien)
16	FW	ESP	Ivan Garcia Labrado (unattached)
32	DF	ENG	Sam Stockley (to (England) AFC Telford United)
34	MF	ARG	Iani Martín Verón (loan return to (Argentina) Estudiantes de La Plata)
36	FW	CAN	Igor Pisanjuk (to (Canada) Mississauga Eagles FC)
38	MF	HUN	András Gárdos (to (England) Sheffield United F.C.)
87	MF	HUN	László Fitos (on loan to (Hungary) Szolnoki MÁV FC)
88	MF	HUN	Dávid Kulcsár (on loan to (Hungary) Vasas SC)
––	DF	HUN	János Birtalan (to (Hungary) Rákospalotai EAC)
––	MF	HUN	Péter Szabó (to (Hungary) Diósgyőri VTK)
––	MF	HUN	Péter Bogáti (to (Hungary) Diósgyőri VTK)
––	MF	HUN	Valentin Berdó (to (Hungary) Kaposvári Rákóczi FC)
––	DF	HUN	Dániel Sajó (to (Hungary) Budapest Honvéd FC)

== Pre-season ==
2 July 2010

NK Osijek (Croatia)	2–0	(Hungary) Ferencvárosi TC
Maglica 44'; Lepinjica 71'	(Report)	Rodenbücher (yellow card) 70'

Stadion Gradski vrt, Osijek
Attendance: 500

23 July 2010

Ferencvárosi TC (Hungary)	0–1	(Turkey) Konyaspor
Stanić (yellow card) 2' (yellow-red card) 19'	(Report)	Yağmur (yellow card) 43'; Montaño 89'

Ménfői úti sporttelep, Győr-Gyirmót
Attendance: 300
Referee: Szabolcs Szilasi

== Statistics ==
=== Appearances and goals ===
Last updated on 22 May 2011.

No.	Pos	Nat	Player	Total		NB 1		Hungarian Cup		League Cup	
No.	Pos	Nat	Player	Apps	Goals	Apps	Goals	Apps	Goals	Apps	Goals
1	GK	(Slovenia) SLO	Marko Ranilović	21	-29	20	-26	1	-3	0	0
4	DF	(Hungary) HUN	Dániel Sváb	2	0	0	0	0	0	2	0
5	DF	(Brazil) BRA	Alves Dos Santos Adriano	12	0	10	0	2	0	0	0
7	FW	(North Macedonia) MKD	Nikola Jakimovski	3	0	1	0	0	0	2	0
8	MF	(Hungary) HUN	György Józsi	28	1	25	0	3	1	0	0
9	FW	(Netherlands) NED	Frank Wiafe Danquah	2	1	0	0	1	1	1	0
10	MF	(Brazil) BRA	Andrezinho de Silva	23	2	21	1	2	1	0	0
11	MF	(Hungary) HUN	Patrik Nagy	2	0	0	0	0	0	2	0
13	DF	(Brazil) BRA	Jose Junior Pereira Ailton	19	0	16	0	2	0	1	0
14	MF	(Serbia) SRB	Srđan Stanić	24	2	22	1	2	1	0	0
15	DF	(Serbia) SRB	Đorđe Tutorić	19	0	17	0	1	0	1	0
16	FW	(Spain) ESP	Ivan Garcia Labrado	1	0	0	0	0	0	1	0
17	FW	(Hungary) HUN	Viktor Bölcsföldi	3	0	0	0	0	0	3	0
18	FW	(Czech Republic) CZE	Marek Heinz	28	7	25	7	3	0	0	0
19	FW	(Somalia) SOM	Liban Abdi	21	2	17	1	2	0	2	1
20	MF	(Hungary) HUN	Dénes Rósa	31	7	28	6	3	1	0	0
21	FW	(Bosnia and Herzegovina) BIH	Emil Miljiković	20	5	16	1	4	4	0	0
22	DF	(Hungary) HUN	István Rodenbücher	23	2	19	2	3	0	1	0
23	GK	(Malta) MLT	Justin Haber	12	-17	10	-16	2	-1	0	0
24	FW	(Hungary) HUN	Bálint Nyilasi	2	1	0	0	0	0	2	1
25	MF	(Hungary) HUN	Béla Maróti	28	3	25	3	3	0	0	0
26	DF	(Hungary) HUN	Attila Dragóner	11	1	10	1	1	0	0	0
27	MF	(Malta) MLT	André Schembri	28	17	27	16	1	1	0	0
28	GK	(Hungary) HUN	Tamás Mester	4	-3	0	0	1	-1	3	-2
29	DF	(Hungary) HUN	Noel Fülöp	4	0	0	0	0	0	4	0
30	MF	(Hungary) HUN	Bence Tóth	25	2	20	0	4	1	1	1
32	DF	(England) ENG	Sam Stockley	4	0	2	0	1	0	1	0
33	DF	(Hungary) HUN	Balázs Vattai	4	0	0	0	0	0	4	0
34	MF	(Argentina) ARG	Iani Martín Verón	1	0	0	0	0	0	1	0
35	MF	(Argentina) ARG	Héctor Gabriel Morales	22	4	16	2	4	2	2	0
36	FW	(Canada) CAN	Igor Pisanjuk	2	0	1	0	0	0	1	0
38	MF	(Hungary) HUN	András Gárdos	2	0	0	0	0	0	2	0
51	MF	(Hungary) HUN	Máté Vass	3	0	0	0	0	0	3	0
55	GK	(Hungary) HUN	Levente Jova	1	-1	0	0	0	0	1	-1
60	FW	(Hungary) HUN	Péter Pölöskey	12	3	9	2	0	0	3	1
78	DF	(Hungary) HUN	Zoltán Balog	26	1	24	0	2	1	0	0
85	DF	(Hungary) HUN	Csaba Csizmadia	33	2	29	1	4	1	0	0
87	MF	(Hungary) HUN	László Fitos	3	1	0	0	1	0	2	1
88	MF	(Hungary) HUN	Dávid Kulcsár	11	1	7	1	3	0	1	0
90	MF	(Hungary) HUN	Viktor Peszmeg	2	0	0	0	0	0	2	0
91	FW	(Hungary) HUN	István Kovács	1	0	0	0	0	0	1	0
––	MF	(Hungary) HUN	Máté Papp	2	0	0	0	0	0	2	0
––	MF	(Hungary) HUN	Roland Szabó	2	0	0	0	0	0	2	0
––	MF	(Hungary) HUN	Valentin Berdó	1	0	0	0	0	0	1	0
––	MF	(Hungary) HUN	Zsolt Antal	1	0	0	0	0	0	1	0
––	FW	(Lithuania) LTU	Valdas Trakys	1	0	0	0	0	0	1	0
––	MF	(Hungary) HUN	Axel Tóth	2	0	0	0	0	0	2	0
––	DF	(Hungary) HUN	Gergő Gyürki	1	0	0	0	0	0	1	0
––	MF	(Hungary) HUN	Gábor Erdei	1	0	0	0	0	0	1	0
––	FW	(Hungary) HUN	Zsolt Tóbiás	1	0	0	0	0	0	1	0

=== Top scorers ===
Includes all competitive matches. The list is sorted by shirt number when total goals are equal.

Last updated on 22 May 2011

Position	Nation	Number	Name	Soproni Liga	Hungarian Cup	League Cup	Total
1	(Malta)	27	André Schembri	16	1	0	17
2	(Czech Republic)	18	Marek Heinz	7	0	0	7
3	(Hungary)	20	Dénes Rósa	6	1	0	7
4	(Bosnia and Herzegovina)	21	Emil Miljiković	1	4	0	5
5	(Argentina)	35	Héctor Morales	2	2	0	4
6	(Hungary)	25	Béla Maróti	3	0	0	3
7	(Hungary)	60	Péter Pölöskey	2	0	1	3
8	(Hungary)	22	István Rodenbücher	2	0	0	2
9	(Hungary) (Romania)	81	Csaba Csizmadia	1	1	0	2
10	(Brazil)	10	Andrezinho	1	1	0	2
11	(Serbia)	14	Srđan Stanić	1	1	0	1
12	(Somalia) (Norway)	19	Liban Abdi	1	0	1	2
13	(Hungary)	30	Bence Tóth	0	1	1	2
14	(Hungary)	88	Dávid Kulcsár	1	0	0	1
15	(Hungary)	26	Attila Dragóner	1	0	0	1
16	(Netherlands)	9	Frank Wiafe Danquah	0	1	0	1
17	(Hungary)	78	Zoltán Balog	0	1	0	1
18	(Hungary)	8	György Józsi	0	1	0	1
19	(Hungary)	87	László Fitos	0	0	1	1
20	(Hungary)	24	Bálint Nyilasi	0	0	1	1
/	/	/	Own Goals	5	1	0	6
			TOTALS	48	16	5	69

=== Disciplinary record ===
Includes all competitive matches. Players with 1 card or more included only.

Last updated on 22 May 2011

Position	Nation	Number	Name	Soproni Liga		Hungarian Cup		League Cup		Total (Hu Total)	
Position	Nation	Number	Name	Yellow card	Red card	Yellow card	Red card	Yellow card	Red card	Yellow card	Red card
GK	(Slovenia)	1	Marko Ranilović	1	0	0	0	0	0	1 (1)	0 (0)
DF	(Hungary)	4	Dániel Sváb	0	0	0	0	1	0	1 (0)	0 (0)
FW	(North Macedonia)	7	Nikola Jakimovski	0	0	0	0	1	0	1 (0)	0 (0)
DF	(Brazil)	10	Andrezinho	4	0	0	0	0	0	4 (4)	0 (0)
DF	(Brazil)	13	Junior	3	0	0	0	0	0	3 (3)	0 (0)
DF	(Serbia)	14	Srđan Stanić	2	1	1	0	0	0	3 (2)	1 (1)
DF	(Serbia)	15	Đorđe Tutorić	4	0	1	0	0	0	5 (4)	0 (0)
FW	(Czech Republic)	18	Marek Heinz	4	2	1	0	0	0	5 (4)	2 (2)
MF	(Somalia)	19	Liban Abdi	2	0	0	0	0	0	2 (2)	0 (0)
MF	(Hungary)	20	Dénes Rósa	7	0	0	0	0	0	7 (7)	0 (0)
FW	(Bosnia and Herzegovina)	21	Emil Miljiković	3	0	1	0	0	0	4 (3)	0 (0)
DF	(Hungary)	22	István Rodenbücher	4	1	1	0	0	0	5 (4)	1 (1)
MF	(Hungary)	25	Béla Maróti	6	1	0	0	0	0	6 (6)	1 (1)
DF	(Hungary)	26	Attila Dragóner	1	0	0	0	0	0	1 (1)	0 (0)
MF	(Malta)	27	André Schembri	5	0	1	0	0	0	6 (5)	0 (0)
MF	(Hungary)	30	Bence Tóth	6	0	1	0	0	0	7 (6)	0 (0)
DF	(England)	32	Sam Stockley	0	0	1	0	0	0	1 (0)	0 (0)
DF	(Hungary)	33	Balázs Vattai	0	0	0	0	1	0	1 (0)	0 (0)
MF	(Argentina)	35	Héctor Gabriel Morales	3	0	1	0	0	0	4 (3)	0 (0)
FW	(Canada)	36	Igor Pisanjuk	0	0	0	0	1	0	1 (0)	0 (0)
FW	(Hungary)	60	Péter Pölöskey	1	0	0	0	0	0	1 (1)	0 (0)
DF	(Hungary)	78	Zoltán Balog	3	0	0	0	0	0	3 (3)	0 (0)
MF	(Hungary)	85	Csaba Csizmadia	7	0	1	0	0	0	8 (7)	0 (0)
MF	(Hungary)	––	Máté Papp	0	0	0	0	1	0	1 (0)	0 (0)
			TOTALS	66	5	10	0	5	0	81 (66)	5 (5)

=== Overall ===
Games played	38 (30 Soproni Liga, 4 Magyar Kupa and 4 Ligakupa)
Games won	19 (15 Soproni Liga, 3 Magyar Kupa and 1 Ligakupa)
Games drawn	8 (5 Soproni Liga, 0 Magyar Kupa and 3 Ligakupa)
Games lost	11 (10 Soproni Liga, 1 Magyar Kupa and 0 Ligakupa)
Goals scored	71
Goals conceded	51
Goal difference	+20
Yellow cards	81
Red cards	5
Worst discipline	(Czech Republic) Marek Heinz (5 (yellow card) , 2 (red card) )
Best result	8–1 (A) v Újbuda TC – Magyar Kupa – 22-09-2010
Worst result	0–6 (A) v Újpest FC – Nemzeti Bajnokság I – 10-09-2010
Most appearances	(Hungary) (Romania) Csaba Csizmadia (33 appearances)
Top scorer	(Malta) André Schembri (17 goals)
Points	65/114 (57.02%)

Last updated: 22 May 2011

== Nemzeti Bajnokság I ==
=== Classification ===
Pos	Team	Pld	W	D	L	GF	GA	GD	Pts	Qualification or relegation
1	Videoton (C)	30	18	7	5	59	29	+30	61	Qualification for Champions League second qualifying round
2	Paks	30	17	5	8	54	37	+17	56	Qualification for Europa League first qualifying round
3	Ferencváros	30	15	5	10	50	43	+7	50	Qualification for Europa League first qualifying round
4	ZTE	30	14	6	10	51	47	+4	48	
5	Debrecen	30	12	10	8	53	43	+10	46	

Source: soccerway.com
Rules for classification: 1st points; 2nd overall wins; 3rd goal difference; 4th goals scored
(C) Champions

=== Results summary ===
Overall								Home						Away					
Pld	W	D	L	GF	GA	GD	Pts	W	D	L	GF	GA	GD	W	D	L	GF	GA	GD
30	15	5	10	50	43	+7	50	9	2	4	25	19	+6	6	3	6	25	24	+1

Last updated: 22 May 2011.
Source: NB1

=== Results by round ===
Round	1	2	3	4	5	6	7	8	9	10	11	12	13	14	15	16	17	18	19	20	21	22	23	24	25	26	27	28	29	30
Ground	H	A	H	A	H	A	H	A	H	H	A	H	A	H	A	A	H	A	H	A	H	A	H	A	A	H	A	H	A	H
Result	W	W	L	D	W	L	L	W	W	W	L	W	L	W	W	L	W	W	L	L	W	D	L	W	L	D	W	D	D	W
Position	5	2	5	5	3	7	9	6	4	3	4	3	5	4	3	4	2	2	2	2	2	2	4	2	4	4	3	3	3	3

Updated to match(es) played on 22 May 2011. Source: Matches
A = Away; H = Home; W = Win; D = Draw; L = Loss

=== Matches ===
30 July 2010
19:00 CEST

Ferencvárosi TC	2–1 (2 – 1)	Paksi SE
Heinz 10'; Tutorić (yellow card) 31'; J. Szabó 33' (o.g.); B. Tóth (yellow card) 38'; Csizmadia (yellow card) 68'	(Report)	Bartha 8' (yellow card) 84'

Stadion Albert Flórián, Budapest
Attendance: 5,500
Referee: Zsolt Szabó
- Ferencvárosi TC: Ranilović – Stockley, Csizmadia, Tutoric, Junior – Andrezinho (Abdi 69.), Maróti, Stanic (Rodenbücher 86.), Rósa, B. Tóth (D. Kulcsár 79.) – Heinz. Coach: László Prukner.
- Paksi SE: A. Kovács – Sifter, Fiola, J. Szabó, Csehi – Bartha (Miskolczi 86.), T. Heffler, Sipeki (Palásthy 82.), Lisztes (T. Kiss 68.), Vayer – Montvai. Coach: Károly Kis.
- G.: Heinz (10.), J. Szabó (33. – o.g.) – Bartha (8.)
- Y.: Tutoric (31.), B. Tóth (38.), Csizmadia (68.) – Bartha (84.)

7 August 2010
20:00 CEST

Kecskeméti TE	1–2 (1 – 1)	Ferencvárosi TC
Ebala (yellow card) 41'; Tököli 45'; Čukić (yellow card) 70'	(Report)	Rósa 4'; Csizmadia (yellow card) 49'; Heinz (yellow card) 67'; Abdi 87'

Széktói Stadion, Kecskemét
Attendance: 6,500
Referee: Ferenc Bede
- Kecskeméti TE: Holczer – Némedi, B. Balogh, Lambulic, I. Farkas – Litsingi, Ebala, Cukic (Dosso 75.), Savic (Csordás 80.) – Foxi (Wilson 80.), Tököli. Coach: István Urbányi.
- Ferencvárosi TC: Ranilović – Csizmadia, Z. Balog, Tutoric, Junior – Andrezinho (B. Tóth 61.), Maróti, Stanic (Pisanjuk 86.), Rósa, D. Kulcsár (Abdi 75.) – Heinz. Coach: László Prukner.
- G.: Tököli (45.) – Rósa (4.), Abdi (87.)
- Y.: Ebala (41.), Cukic (70.) – Csizmadia (49.), Heinz (67.)

15 August 2010
17:30 CEST

Ferencvárosi TC	1–3 (0 – 3)	Budapest Honvéd FC
Junior (yellow card) 12'; Stanić (red card) 40'; Csizmadia (yellow card) 43'; Kulcsár 51'; Heinz (yellow card) 78'	(Report)	Rufino 8'; Hajdú 13' (pen.); Haman (yellow card) 23'; Rouani 33'

Stadion Albert Flórián, Budapest
Attendance: 4,000
Referee: Roland Veizer
- Ferencvárosi TC: Ranilović – Balog (Rodenbücher 59.), Csizmadia, Tutoric, Junior (Kulcsár 25.) – Maróti (Abdi 68.), Józsi, Stanic, Andrezinho – Rósa, Heinz. Coach: László Prukner.
- Budapest Honvéd FC: Kemenes – Takács, Cséke, Botis, Hajdú – Coira, Akassou, Danilo (Bajner 76.), Sadjo (Conteh 70.) – Rouani (Abass 67.), Rufino. Coach: Massimo Morales.
- G.: Kulcsár (51.) – Rufino (8.), Hajdú (13. – pen.), Rouani (33.)
- Y.: Junior (12.), Csizmadia (43.), Heinz (79.) – Sadjo (23.)
- R.: Stanic (40.)

21 August 2010
17:30 CEST

Videoton FC	1–1 (0 – 1)	Ferencvárosi TC
Lipták (yellow card) 18'; Horváth (yellow card) 43'; Nikolić 63'	(Report)	Andrezinho 22' (yellow card) 72'; Tóth (yellow card) 34'; Maróti (yellow card) 44'; Rodenbücher (red card) 77'

Stadion Sóstói, Székesfehérvár
Attendance: 7,706
Referee: Mihály Fábián
- Videoton FC: Tujvel – Lázár, Lipták, Horváth, Hidvégi – Sándor (Gosztonyi 85.), Vasiljevic (Polonkai 46.), Elek – Nagy, Alves, Vujovic (Nikolic 60.). Coach: György Mezey.
- Ferencvárosi TC: Ranilović – Rodenbücher, Csizmadia, Junior – Schembri (Pölöskei 83.), Rósa, Maróti, Józsi, Tóth (Kulcsár 63.) – Andrezinho (Adriano 89.), Heinz. Coach: László Prukner.
- G.: Nikolic (63.) – Andrezinho (22.)
- Y.: Lipták (18.), Horváth (43.) – Tóth (34.), Maróti (44.), Andrezinho (72.)
- R.: Rodenbücher (77.)

1 September 2010
19:00 CEST

Ferencvárosi TC	3–0 (2 – 0)	Győri ETO FC
Heinz 1' 17'; Schembri 47'; Rósa (yellow card) 67'	(Report)	Eugene (yellow card) 9'; Völgyi (yellow card) 25'; Stevanović (yellow card) 67'; Ji-Paraná (yellow card) 67'; Fehér (yellow card) 78'

Stadion Albert Flórián, Budapest
Attendance: 10,000
Referee: Ferenc Bede
- Ferencvárosi TC: Ranilović – Balog, Csizmadia, Junior (Pölöskey 86.) – Rósa, Maróti, Józsi, Tóth (Jakimovski 81.) – Schembri, Heinz, Andrezinho (Adriano 68.). Coach: László Prukner.
- Győri ETO FC: Stevanovic – Völgyi, Fehér, Babic, Szabó – Ji-Paraná (Kiss 70.), Tokody, Ganugrava, Trajkovic (Aleksidze 55.), Eugene (Koltai 25.) – Bouguerra. Coach: Attila Pintér.
- G.: Heinz (1., 17.), Schembri (47.)
- Y.: Rósa (67.) – Eugene (9.), Völgyi (25.), Stevanovic (67.), Ji-Paraná (67.), Fehér (78.)

10 September 2010
17:30 CEST

Újpest FC	6–0 (2 – 0)	Ferencvárosi TC
Böőr (yellow card) 17'; Simon 28'; Takács (yellow card) 40'; Tisza 43' 90+3'; Rajczi 56' (yellow card) 56' (goal) 72'; Mitrović 61'	(Report)	Heinz (red card) 40'; Balog (yellow card) 43'

Szusza Ferenc Stadium, Budapest
Attendance: 9,000
Referee: Péter Solymosi
- Újpest FC: Balajcza – Szokol (Kiss 66.), Vermes, Takács, Pollák – Böőr (Simek 63.), Egerszegi, Mitrovic, Simon (Matos 90.) – Tisza, Rajczi. Coach: Géza Mészöly.
- Ferencvárosi TC: Ranilović – Balog, Csizmadia, Junior – Andrezinho (Stanic 58.), Maróti (Adriano 85.), Rósa, Józsi, Tóth (Kulcsár 70.) – Schembri, Heinz. Coach: László Prukner.
- G.: Simon (28.), Tisza (43., 93.), Rajczi (56., 72.), Mitrovic (61.)
- Y.: Böőr (18.), Takács (40.), Rajczi (56.) – Balog (43.)
- R.: Heinz (40.)

18 September 2010
17:30 CEST

Ferencvárosi TC	1–2 (0 – 1)	BFC Siófok
Schembri 71'; Rósa (yellow card) 81'; Junior (yellow card) 90+2'	(Report)	Sowunmi (yellow card) 19' (goal) 69'; Kecskés (yellow card) 23'; Homma 41'

Stadion Albert Flórián, Budapest
Attendance: 3,000
Referee: Ádám Németh
- Ferencvárosi TC: Ranilović – Balog, Csizmadia, Junior – Andrezinho, Maróti, Tóth (Pölöskey 65.), Józsi (Rodenbücher 46.), Rósa – Abdi (Kulcsár 65.), Schembri. Coach: László Prukner.
- BFC Siófok: Molnár – Mogyorósi, Graszl, Fehér, Novák – Lukács (Piller 87.), Kecskés (Ludánszki 60.), Tusori, Ivancsics (Ribeiro 66.) – Homma, Sowunmi. Coach: István Mihalecz.
- G.: Schembri (71.) – Homma (41.), Sowunmi (69.)
- Y.: Rósa (81.), Junior (92.) – Sowunmi (19.), Kecskés (23.)

26 September 2010
17:30 CEST

Vasas SC	1–3 (0 – 2)	Ferencvárosi TC
Pavičević (yellow card) 23'; Lázok 52'	(Report)	Schembri 21' 30' (yellow card) 31' (goal) 53'; Miljiković (yellow card) 46'; Maróti (yellow card) 63'

Stadion Rudolf Illovszky, Budapest
Attendance: 3,500
Referee: Viktor Kassai
- Vasas SC: Végh – Balog, Arnaut (Loussaief 20.), Kovács, Gáspár, Katona (Phantkhava 69.) – Benounes, Pavicevic, Bakos (Lázok 46.), Németh – Ferenczi. Coach: Giovanni Dellacasa.
- Ferencvárosi TC: Ranilović – Rodenbücher, Csizmadia, Balog, Junior (Adriano 54.) – Schembri, Rósa, Maróti, Stanic, Andrezinho – Miljkovic (Józsi 72.). Coach: László Prukner.
- G.: Lázok (52.) – Schembri (21., 30., 53.)
- Y.: Pavicevic (23.) – Schambri (31.), Miljkovic (46.), Maróti (63.)

1 October 2010
19:00 CEST

Ferencvárosi TC	3–0 (2 – 0)	MTK Budapest FC
Sütő 8' (o.g.) 25' (o.g.); Stanić (yellow card) 55'; Rodenbücher (yellow card) 78'; Csizmadia 84'	(Report)	Vadnai (yellow card) 23'; Pátkai (yellow card) 50'

Stadion Albert Flórián, Budapest
Attendance: 5,000
Referee: Zsolt Szabó
- Ferencvárosi TC: Ranilović – Adriano, Balog, Csizmadia, Rodenbücher – Andrezinho, Maróti, Stanic (Tóth 64.) – Rósa (Józsi 13.), Schembri, Miljkovic (Abdi 79.). Coach: László Prukner.
- MTK Budapest FC: Szatmári – Vukadinovic, Szekeres, Sütő, Vadnai (Ladányi 46.) – Szabó (Könyves 60.), Gál, Kanta, Pátkai, A. Pál – Tischler (Eppel 84.). Coach: József Garami.
- G.: Sütő (8. – o.g., 25. – o.g.), Csizmadia (84.)
- Y.: Stanic (55.), Rodenbücher (78.) – Vadnai (23.), Pátkai (50.)

16 October 2010
17:30 CEST

Ferencvárosi TC	1–0 (1 – 0)	Kaposvári Rákóczi FC
Andrezinho (yellow card) 33'; Rósa 44' (pen.); Rodenbücher (yellow card) 52'; Maróti (yellow card) 66' (yellow-red card) 75'	(Report)	Zsók (yellow card) 14'; Okuka (yellow card) 33'; Oláh (yellow card) 36'; Grúz (yellow card) 40'; Zahorecz (yellow card) 78' (yellow-red card) 89'; Kulcsár (yellow card) 81'

Stadion Albert Flórián, Budapest
Attendance: 5,000
Referee: Ferenc Bede
- Ferencvárosi TC: Ranilović – Balog, Csizmadia, Rodenbücher, Adriano – Andrezinho (Józsi 80.), Maróti, Rósa, Stanic (Tóth 71.), Schembri – Miljkovic (Heinz 57.). Coach: László Prukner.
- Kaposvári Rákóczi FC: Kovács – Grúz (Balázs 69.), Okuka, Zahorecz, Zsók – Gujic, Pavlovic, Pedro, Jawad (Godslove 81.) – Oláh, Peric (Kulcsár 62.). Coach: Tibor Sisa.
- G.: Rósa (44. – pen.)
- Y.: Andrezinho (33.), Rodenbücher (52.), Maróti (66.) – Zsók (14.), Okuka (33.), Oláh (36.), Grúz (40.), Zahorecz (78.), Kulcsár (81.)
- R.: Maróti (75.) – Zahorecz (89.)

24 October 2010
17:30 CEST

Debreceni VSC	2–1 (1 – 0)	Ferencvárosi TC
Kabát 5' (pen.) (yellow card) 15' (yellow-red card) 58'; Czvitkovics 88'	(Report)	Rósa (yellow card) 30'; Schembri (yellow card) 50'; Rodenbücher 75'

Stadion Oláh Gábor Út, Debrecen
Attendance: 7,000
Referee: Zoltán Iványi
- Debreceni VSC: Malinauskas – Nagy, Simac, Mijadinoski, Fodor – Czvitkovics, Bódi (Dombi 78.), Varga, Szakály (Coulibaly 74.) – Kabát, Yannick (Kiss 66.). Coach: András Herczeg.
- Ferencvárosi TC: Ranilović – Adriano (Miljkovic 64.), Csizmadia, BAlog (Stockley 81.), Rodenbücher – Andrezinho, Józsi (Tóth 71.), Stanic, Rósa – Heinz, Schembri. Coach: László Prukner.
- G.: Kabát (5. – pen.), Czvitkovics (88.) – Rodenbücher (75.)
- Y.: Kabát (15.) – Rósa (30.), Schembri (50.)
- R.: Kabát (58.)

30 October 2010
15:00 CEST

Ferencvárosi TC	1–0 (0 – 0)	Szolnoki MÁV FC
Schembri (yellow card) 19'; Rodenbücher 63'	(Report)	Stanišić (yellow card) 38' (yellow-red card) 90'

Stadion Albert Flórián, Budapest
Attendance: 3,500
Referee: József Berger
- Ferencvárosi TC: Haber – Adriano, Csizmadia, Rodenbücher – Rósa (Stanic 76.), Maróti, Józsi (Tóth 56.), Andrezinho – Schembri (Morales 67.), Heinz, Miljkovic. Coach: László Prukner.
- Szolnoki MÁV FC: Rézsó – Cornaci, Stanisic, Pető, Balogh – Remili, Molnár, Koós (Tchami 70.), Szalai, Vörös (Antal 78.) – Pisanjuk (Ngalle 66.). Coach: Antal Simon.
- G.: Rodenbücher (63.)
- Y.: Schembri (19.) – Stanisic (38.)
- R.: Stanisic (90.)

6 November 2010
17:30 CEST

Zalaegerszegi TE	2–1 (1 – 0)	Ferencvárosi TC
Balázs 4'; Panikvar (yellow card) 26'; Kamber (yellow card) 59'; Delić 89' (pen.); Horváth (yellow card) 90'; Varga (yellow card) 90+4'	(Report)	Miljiković (yellow card) 21'; Rósa 64'; Csizmadia (yellow card) 67'; Maróti (yellow card) 88'

ZTE Arena, Zalaegerszeg
Attendance: 6,500
Referee: Viktor Kassai
- Zalaegerszegi TE: Vlaszák – Kocsárdi, Miljatovic, Varga, Panikvar – Szalai, Kamber, Illés (Horváth 59.), Balázs – Rajcomar (Delic 68.), Simon (Turcsik 83.). Coach: János Csank.
- Ferencvárosi TC: Haber – Balog (Adriano 34.), Csizmadia, Rodenbücher – Maróti, Rósa (Stanic 80.), Józsi, Andrezinho – Schembri, Heinz, Miljikovic (Abdi 53.). Coach: László Prukner.
- G.: Balázs (4.), Delic (89. – pen.) – Rósa (64.)
- Y.: Panikvar (26.), Kamber (59.), Horváth (90.), Varga (94.) – Miljikovic (21.), Csizmadia (67.), Maróti (88.)

14 November 2010
17:30 CEST

Ferencvárosi TC	2–1 (1 – 0)	Szombathelyi Haladás
Heinz 40'; Maróti (yellow card) 52' (goal) 62'	(Report)	Kenesei (yellow card) 9' (yellow-red card) 93' (goal) 84'; Nagy (yellow card) 42'; Oross (yellow card) 55'

Stadion Albert Flórián, Budapest
Attendance: 5,000
Referee: Zsolt Szabó
- Ferencvárosi TC: Ranilović – Csizmadia, Dragóner (Adriano 46.), Rodenbücher – Rósa, Maróti, Józsi (Tóth 83.), Stanic (Morales 37.), Andrezinho – Schembri, Heinz. Coach: László Prukner.
- Szombathelyi Haladás: Rózsa – Schimmer, Guzmics, Devecseri (Fodrek 66.), Tóth – Nagy, Korolovszky, Á. Simon, Sipos (Csontos 60.) – Kenesei, Oross. Coach: Zoltán Aczél.
- G.: Heinz (40.), Maróti (62.) – Kenesei (84.)
- Y.: Maróti (52.) – Kenesei (9.), Nagy (42.), Oross (55.)
- R.: Kenesei (93.)

20 November 2010
17:30 CEST

Lombard-Pápa TFC	0–5 (0 – 3)	Ferencvárosi TC
Bárányos (yellow card) 28'; Németh (yellow card) 85'	(Report)	Andrezinho (yellow card) 6'; Rodenbücher (yellow card) 9'; Schembri 18' 27' 76'; Heinz 40'; Morales 75'; Csizmadia (yellow card) 80'; Tóth (yellow card) 88'

Stadion Várkerti, Pápa
Attendance: 4,800
Referee: Zoltán Iványi
- Lombard-Pápa TFC: Szűcs – G. Tóth, Farkas, Supic, Németh – Rebryk, Gyömbér, Bárányos, N. Tóth (Palkó 65.) – Abwo (Quintero 55.), Maric (Jovánczai 13.). Coach: György Véber.
- Ferencvárosi TC: Haber – Balog, Csizmadia, Rodenbücher – Rósa, Józsi, Maróti, Andrezinho (Dragóner 83.) – Schembri (Tóth 77.), Heinz, Miljkovic (Morales 67.). Coach: László Prukner.
- G.: Schembri (18., 27., 76.), Heinz (40.), Morales (75.)
- Y.: Bárányos (28.), Németh (85.) – Andrezinho (6.), Rodenbücher (9.), Csizmadia (80.), Tóth (88.)

30 November 2010
17:00 CEST

Paksi SE	3–2 (0 – 0)	Ferencvárosi TC
Éger (yellow card) 40'; Vayer 48'; Böde 78'; Montvai 85'	(Report)	Maróti 54'; Miljiković 84'

Stadion PSE, Paks
Attendance: 2,000
Referee: Sándor Andó-Szabó
- Paksi SE: Csernyánszki – Heffler, Éger, Fiola, Csehi – Bartha (Szabó 73.), Böde, Sifter, Sipeki – Kiss (Montvai 67.), Vayer (Magasföldi 90.). Coach: Károly Kis.
- Ferencvárosi TC: Haber – Balog, Dragóner, Rodenbücher – Rósa, Maróti, Józsi (Morales 74.), Andrezinho – Schembri, Heinz, Miljkovic. Coach: László Prukner.
- G.: Vayer (47.), Böde (78.), Montvai (85.) – Maróti (54.), Miljkovic (84.)
- Y.: Éger (40.)

25 February 2011
19:00 CEST

Ferencvárosi TC	2–1 (0 – 1)	Kecskeméti TE
Tutorić (yellow card) 6'; Preklet 50' (o.g.); Rósa 86' (pen.)	(Report)	Alempijević (yellow card) 6'; Tököli 38'; Preklet (yellow card) 49'

Stadion Albert Flórián, Budapest
Attendance: 5,000
Referee: Zsolt Szabó
- Ferencvárosi TC: Ranilović – Balog, Csizmadia, Tutoric – Stanic (Tóth 67.), Rósa, Maróti, Heinz, Józsi (Andrezinho 77.) – Schembri, Morales (Miljkovic 85.). Coach: László Prukner.
- Kecskeméti TE: Rybánsky – Gyagya, Radanovic (Preklet 46.), Balogh, Mohl – Savic, Alempijevic, Litsingi (Bertus 76.) – Bori, Tököli, Foxi (Vujovic 60.). Coach: Tomislav Sivic.
- G.: Preklet (50. – o.g.), Rósa (86. – pen.) – Tököli (38.)
- Y.: Tutoric (6.) – Alempijevic (6.), Preklet (49.)

6 March 2011
17:30 CEST

Budapest Honvéd FC	0–1 (0 – 1)	Ferencvárosi TC
Botis (yellow card) 61'; Lovrić (yellow card) 79'; Hajdú (yellow card) 88'; Zelenka (yellow card) 89'; Akassou (yellow card) 90+2'	(Report)	Stanić 12'; Ranilović (yellow card) 75'; Csizmadia (yellow card) 79'; Abdi (yellow card) 90+3'

Bozsik Stadion, Budapest
Attendance: 2,500
Referee: József Berger
- Budapest Honvéd FC: Tóth – Lovric, Debreceni, Botis, Hajdú – G. Nagy (Danilo 55.), Hidi (Zelenka 55.), Ivancsics, Akassou, Moreira (Vólent 68.) – Bright. Coach: Attila Supka.
- Ferencvárosi TC: Ranilović – Csizmadia, Tutoric, Balog – Stanic, Maróti, Rósa, Józsi (Tóth 65.) – Schembri, Heinz (Andrezinho 83.), Miljkovic (Abdi 68.). Coach: László Prukner.
- G.: Stanic (12.)
- Y.: Botis (61.), Lovric (79.), Hajdú (88.), Zelenka (89.), Akassou (92.) – Ranilović (75.), Csizmadia (79.), Abdi (93.)

12 March 2011
19:30 CEST

Ferencvárosi TC	0–5 (0 – 2)	Videoton FC Fehérvár
Rósa (yellow card) 4'; Balog (yellow card) 25'; Tóth (yellow card) 60'	(Report)	Polonkai (yellow card) 13' (goal) 79'; Alves 26'; Vasiljević 33'; Lipták (yellow card) 42'; Lencse 53'; Andić 67'

Stadion Albert Flórián, Budapest
Attendance: 10,000
Referee: Viktor Kassai
- Ferencvárosi TC: Ranilović – Balog, Csizmadia, Tutoric – Andrezinho (Miljkovic 68.), Józsi (Tóth 46.), Maróti, Rósa, Stanic (Abdi 74.) – Heinz, Schembri. Coach: László Prukner.
- Videoton FC Fehérvár: Bozovic – Andic, Lázár (Milanovic 76.), Lipták, Vaskó – Gosztonyi, Polonkai, Sándor, Vasiljevic (Szakály 70.) – Alves, Lencse (Nikolic 65.). Coach: György Mezey.
- G.: Alves (26.), Vasiljevic (33.), Lencse (52.), Andic (67.), Polonkai (79.)
- Y.: Rósa (4.), Balog (25.), Tóth (60.) – Polonkai (13.), Lipták (42.)

19 March 2011
17:30 CEST

Győri ETO FC	1–0 (0 – 0)	Ferencvárosi TC
Völgyi (yellow card) 42'; Koltai (yellow card) 48'; Aleksidze 50'; Pilibaitis (yellow card) 93'	(Report)	Maróti (yellow card) 34'

ETO Park, Győr
Attendance: 5,000
Referee: Sándor Andó-Szabó
- Győri ETO FC: Stevanovic – Takács, Djordjevic, Fehér, Völgyi – Dinjar (Dudás 70.), Kiss, Pilibaitis, Ji-Paraná – Aleksidze (Trajkovic 76.), Koltai (Bouguerra 76.). Coach: Aurél Csertői.
- Ferencvárosi TC: Ranilović – Csizmadia, Tutoric, Dragóner, Rodenbücher – Rósa, Maróti (Stanic 52.), Andrezinho (Tóth 55.) – Schembri, Heinz, Morales (Abdi 68.). Coach: László Prukner.
- G.: Aleksidze (50.)
- Y.: Völgyi (42.), Koltai (48.), Pilibaitis (93.) – Maróti (34.)

1 April
19:00 CEST

Ferencvárosi TC	1–0 (1 – 0)	Újpest FC
Heinz 40'; Andrezinho (yellow card) 44'; Rodenbücher (yellow card) 47'; Rósa (yellow card) 56'	(Report)	Rajczi (yellow card) 12'; Balajti (yellow card) 19'; Mitrović (yellow card) 20'; Rubus (yellow card) 59'; Lázár (yellow card) 82'

Stadion Albert Flórián, Budapest
Attendance: 10,000
Referee: Zoltán Iványi
- Ferencvárosi TC: Ranilović – Csizmadia, Balog, Tutoric, Rodenbücher – Rósa, Stanic (Tóth 46.), Andrezinho (Józsi 68.) – Schembri, Heinz, Morales (Dragóner 76.). Coach: László Prukner.
- Újpest FC: Balajcza – Szokol, Rubus, Takács, Pollák – Böőr (Lázár 71.), Mitrovic, Tajthy – Balajti (Barczi 77.), Ahjupera (Simek 82.), Rajczi. Coach: Géza Mészöly.
- G.: Heinz (40.)
- Y.: Andrezinho (44.), Rodenbücher (47.), Rósa (56.) – Rajczi (12.), Balajti (18.), Mitrovic (20.), Rubus (59.), Lázár (82.)

9 April 2011
15:00 CEST

BFC Siófok	1–1 (1 – 0)	Ferencvárosi TC
Délczeg 19'; Kecskés (yellow card) 29'; Lukács (yellow card) 84'	(Report)	Schembri (yellow card) 13' (goal) 64'; Tóth (yellow card) 32'; Heinz (yellow card) 48'

Révesz Géza Stadion, Siófok
Attendance: 4,000
Referee: Zsolt Szabó
- BFC Siófok: Molnár – Mogyorósi, Graszl, Fehér, Novák – Lukács (Csermelyi 87.), Tusori, Kecskés, Melczer – Homma (Csordás 70.), Délczeg. Coach: István Mihalecz.
- Ferencvárosi TC: Ranilović – Csizmadia, Balog, Tutoric, Rodenbücher (Pölöskey 59.) – Tóth (Józsi 59.), Maróti, Heinz – Schembri, Miljkovic (Abdi 77.), Morales. Coach: László Prukner.
- G.: Délczeg (19.) – Schembri (64.)
- Y.: Kecskés (29.), Lukács (84.) – Schembri (13.), Tóth (32.), Heinz (48.)

15 April 2011
19:00 CEST

Ferencvárosi TC	0–1 (0 – 0)	Vasas SC
Dragóner (yellow card) 70'	(Report)	Mileusnić (yellow card) 5'; Rezes (yellow card) 14'; Kulcsár (yellow card) 68'; Kovács (yellow card) 74'; Maróti 78' (o.g.); Németh (yellow card) 84'

Stadion Albert Flórián, Budapest
Attendance: 4,500
Referee: Alvaro Miquel Garcia
- Ferencvárosi TC: Haber – Csizmadia, Dragóner, Tutoric, Junior – Rósa, Maróti (Pölöskey 80.), Józsi (Miljkovic 66.) – Schembri, Heinz (Stanic 74.), Morales. Coach: László Prukner.
- Vasas SC: G. Németh – Balog (Lázok 58.), Gáspár, Mileusnic, Katona – Kulcsár, Lisztes (N. Németh 75.), Kovács, Rezes – Szilágyi (Beliczky 77.), Ferenczi. Coach: András Komjáti.
- G.: Maróti (78. – o.g.)
- Y.: Dragóner (70.) – Mileusnic (5.), Rezes (14.), Kulcsár (68.), Kovács (74.), N. Németh (84.)

24 April 2011
17:30 CEST

MTK Budapest FC	1–3 (0 – 0)	Ferencvárosi TC
Vukmir (yellow card) 24'; Könyves 65'; Hajdú (yellow card) 89'	(Report)	Maróti (yellow card) 60' (goal) 86'; Schembri 66' 72'; Miljković (yellow card) 83'

Hidegkuti Nándor Stadium, Budapest
Attendance: 2,500
Referee: Viktor Kassai
- MTK Budapest FC: Szatmári – Vukadinovic, Szekeres, Kálnoki-Kis, Hajdú – Kanta, Vukmir, Könyves (Hrepka 78.), Wolfe (Ladányi 57.), A. Pál (Eppel 86.) – Tischler. Coach: József Garami.
- Ferencvárosi TC: Haber – Balog, Csizmadia, Tutoric, Rodenbücher – Rósa (Junior 73.), Heinz, Maróti, Abdi (Tóth 79.) – Schembri (Miljkovic 75.), Morales. Coach: László Prukner.
- G.: Könyves (65.) – Schembri (66., 72.), Maróti (86.)
- Y.: Vukmir (24.), Hajdú (89.) – Maróti (60.), Miljkovic (83.)

27 April 2011
18:00 CEST

Kaposvári Rákóczi FC	2–1 (0 – 0)	Ferencvárosi TC
Okuka (yellow card) 18'; Gujić (yellow card) 21'; Zsók (yellow card) 25' (goal) 90'; Pavlović (yellow card) 63'; Oláh 63' (pen.)	(Report)	Tutorić (yellow card) 20'; Schembri 47'; Rósa (yellow card) 83'

Stadion Kaposvár Rákóczi, Kaposvár
Attendance: 3,500
Referee: Tamás Bognár
- Kaposvári Rákóczi FC: Kovács – Okuka, Zsók, Grúz, Gujic – Balázs, Hegedűs, Máté (Szepessy 63.), Pavlovic (Jawad 85.) – Oláh (Farkas 90.), Peric. Coach: Tibor Sisa.
- Ferencvárosi TC: Haber – Balog, Csizmadia, Tutoric, Rodenbücher – Schembri, Morales (Stanic 75.), Heinz, Maróti, Rósa – Abdi (Miljkovic 89.). Coach: László Prukner.
- G.: Oláh (63. – pen.), Zsók (90.) – Schembri (47.)
- Y.: Okuka (18.), Gujic (21.), Zsók (25.), Pavlovic (63.) – Tutoric (20.), Rósa (83.)

1 May 2011
17:30 CEST

Ferencvárosi TC	1–1 (0 – 0)	Debreceni VSC
Morales (yellow card) 28'; Balog (yellow card) 36'; Tóth (yellow card) 59'; Heinz (yellow card) 79'; Mijadinoski 86' (o.g.)	(Report)	Szakály (yellow card) 33'; Coulibaly (yellow card) 40' (goal) 56'; Bódi (yellow card) 76'; Ramos (yellow card) 77'; Dombi (yellow card) 92'

Stadion Albert Flórián, Budapest
Attendance: 5,000
Referee: Zoltán Iványi
- Ferencvárosi TC: Haber – Csizmadia, Tutoric, Balog – Junior, Morales (Tóth 57.), Maróti (Józsi 19.), Rósa (Miljkovic 63.) – Schembri, Heinz, Abdi. Coach: László Prukner.
- Debreceni VSC: Novakovic – Nagy, Simac, Mijadinoski, Fodor – Bódi (Dombi 84.), Ramos (Spitzmüller 78.), Varga, Szakály, Yannick (Farkas 92.) – Coulibaly. Coach: Elemér Kondás.
- G.: Mijadinoski (84. – o.g.) – Coulibaly (56.)
- Y.: Morales (28.), Balog (36.), Tóth (59.), Heinz (79.) – Szakály (33.), Coulibaly (40.), Bódi (76.), Ramos (77.), Dombi (90.)

7 May 2011
15:00 CEST

Szolnoki MÁV FC	2–3 (2 – 3)	Ferencvárosi TC
Zsolnai 22' 45'; Gošić (yellow card) 26'; Đurović (yellow card) 41'; Lengyel (yellow card) 53'; Némedi (yellow card) 64'	(Report)	Pölöskey 20'; Schembri 23'; Rósa 42' (pen.) (yellow card) 60'; Júnior (yellow card) 79'; Morales (yellow card) 90'

Tiszaligeti Stadion, Szolnok
Attendance: 4,500
Referee: József Berger
- Szolnoki MÁV FC: Melnichenko – Milicic (Lengyel 26.), Máté, Durovic, Vukomanovic – Fitos (Tchami 59.), Némedi, Jokic (Antal 83.), Búrány – Zsolnai, Gosic. Coach: Antal Simon.
- Ferencvárosi TC: Haber – Balog, Csizmadia, Tutoric, Rodenbücher – Rósa (Józsi 70.), Stanic (Dragóner 81.), Júnior – Schembri, Pölöskey (Abdi 67.), Morales. Coach: László Prukner.
- G.: Zsolnai (22., 45.) – Pölöskey (20.), Schembri (23.), Rósa (42. – pen.)
- Y.: Gosic (26.), Durovic (41.), Lengyel (53.), Némedi (64.) – Rósa (60.), Júnior (79.), Morales (90.)

10 May 2011
20:00 CEST

Ferencvárosi TC	4–4 (1 – 4)	Zalaegerszegi TE
Abdi (yellow card) 25'; Schembri 35' 83'; Pölöskey 55' (yellow card) 89'; Morales (yellow card) 69'; Csizmadia (yellow card) 74'; Heinz 75'	(Report)	Szalai 16' (yellow card) 60'; Balázs 18'; Turkovs 28' (yellow card) 29'; Kamber 39' (yellow card) 42'; Simonfalvi (yellow card) 69'

Stadion Albert Flórián, Budapest
Attendance: 4,000
Referee: Viktor Kassai
- Ferencvárosi TC: Haber – Balog, Csizmadia, Tutoric, Rodenbücher (Józsi 28.) – Abdi (Heinz 54.), Stanic (Dragóner 84.), Morales, Júnior – Schembri, Pölöskey. Coach: László Prukner.
- Zalaegerszegi TE: Vlaszák – Szalai (Kocsárdi 62.), Kovács, Bogunovic, Miljatovic, Panikvar – Simonfalvi (Rajcomar 80.), Kamber, Horváth (I. Delic 58.), Balázs – Turkovs. Coach: János Csank.
- G.: Schembri (35., 83.), Pölöskey (55.), Heinz (75.) – Szalai (16.), Balázs (18.), Turkovs (28.), Kamber (39.)
- Y.: Abdi (25.), Morales (69.), Csizmadia (74.), Pölöskey (89.) – Turkovs (29.), Kamber (42.), Szalai (60.), Simonfalvi (69.)

15 May 2011
17:30 CEST

Szombathelyi Haladás	1–1 (0 – 0)	Ferencvárosi TC
Fodrek (yellow card) 24'; Nagy II (yellow card) 30' (yellow-red card) 77'; Iszlai 51' (pen.); Rózsa (yellow card) 90'	(Report)	Tutorić (yellow card) 14'; Stanić (yellow card) 31'; Rósa 61'; Heinz (red card) 90'

Stadion Rohonci Út, Szombathely
Attendance: 6,000
Referee: Sándor Andó-Szabó
- Szombathelyi Haladás: Rózsa – Schimmer, Guzmics, Nagy II, P. Tóth – Sipos (Molnár 81.), Nagy I (Sluka 79.), Á. Simon, Iszlai, Halmosi – Fodrek (A. Simon 86.). Coach: Zoltán Aczél.
- Ferencvárosi TC: Ranilović – Balog, Csizmadia, Tutoric, Júnior – Rósa, Stanic, Józsi, Morales (Dragóner 87.), Schembri (Abdi 79.) – Pölöskey (Heinz 54.). Coach: László Prukner.
- G.: Iszlai (51. – pen.) – Rósa (61.)
- Y.: Fodrek (24.), Nagy II (30.), Rózsa (90.) – Tutoric (14.), Stanic (31.)
- R.: Nagy II (77.) – Heinz (90.)

22 May 2011
17:30 CEST

Ferencvárosi TC	3–0 (1 – 0)	Lombard-Pápa TFC
Schembri 45' (yellow card) 68'; Morales 71'; Dragóner 89'	(Report)	Rebryk (yellow card) 22'; Quintero (yellow card) 24'; Žuļevs (yellow card) 32'

Stadion Albert Flórián, Budapest
Attendance: 4,000
Referee: Mihály Fábián
- Ferencvárosi TC: Ranilović – Balog, Csizmadia, Tutoric, Júnior – Rósa, Maróti, Stanic (Dragóner 55.), Abdi – Schembri (Pölöskey 74.), Morales (Józsi 79.). Coach: László Prukner.
- Lombard-Pápa TFC: Szűcs – Nagy, Dlusztus, Farkas, Tóth – Quintero, Bárányos, Supic (Venczel 74.), Zulevs – Bali (Varga 68.), Rebryk (Szabó 61.). Coach: György Véber.
- G.: Schembri (45.), Morales (71.), Dragóner (89.)
- Y.: Schembri (68.) – Rebryk (22.), Quintero (24.), Zulevs (32.)

== Hungarian Cup ==
=== Third round ===
22 September 2010
15:30 CEST

Újbuda TC	1–8 (1 – 3)	Ferencvárosi TC
Potemkin 30' (pen.)	(Report)	Miljiković 9' 20'; Csizmadia (yellow card) 30' (goal) 81'; Stanić 43'; Danquah 49'; Laki 54' (o.g.); Stockley (yellow card) 63'; Balog 72'; Morales 83'

Csepeli Stadion, Budapest
Attendance: 400
Referee: József Erdős
- Újbuda TC: Petrovics – Lettrich (Suth 46.), Kun, Budai, T. Horváth – Laki, Székely, Kovács, Kövesdi – Nagy (Pleszkán 50.), Potemkin (Lókai 60.). Coach: Zoltán Kenyó.
- Ferencvárosi TC: Mester – Rodenbücher, Adriano, Csizmadia, Junior (Stockley 46.) – Kulcsár, Maróti (Balog 46.), Tóth (Morales 60.), Stanic – Danquah, Miljkovic. Coach: László Prukner.
- G.: Potemkin (30. – pen.) – Miljkovic (9., 20.), Stanic (43.), Danquah (49.), Laki (54. – o.g.), Balog (72.), Csizmadia (81.), Morales (83.)
- Y.: Csizmadia (30.), Stockley (63.)

=== Fourth round ===
27 October 2010
18:00 CEST

Rákospalotai EAC	0–5 (0 – 3)	Ferencvárosi TC
Gulyás (yellow card) 14'	(Report)	Morales 21'; Rósa 29'; Miljikovic 38' 55'; Józsi 61'

Stadion Budai II. Laszló, Budapest
Attendance: 500
Referee: Gábor Oláh
- Rákospalotai EAC: Somogyi – Menyhárt, Tóth, Ferencz, Mészáros – Gulyás, Dancs (Dinka 65.), Cseri, Gáspár (Maczó 84.) – Olasz, Borsi (Szabó 53.). Coach: János Mátyus.
- Ferencvárosi TC: Haber – Adriano (Fitos 72.), Csizmadia (Dragóner 65.), Rodenbücher – Tóth, Maróti, Rósa (Kulcsár 46.), Józsi – Morales, Heinz, Miljkovic. Coach: László Prukner.
- G.: Morales (21.), Rósa (29.), Miljkovic (38., 55.), Józsi (61.)
- Y.: Gulyás (14.)

=== Fifth round ===
==== First leg ====
10 November 2010
18:00 CEST

BFC Siófok	3–1 (2 – 0)	Ferencvárosi TC
László 7' (pen.); Csermelyi 45' 68'; Piller (yellow card) 90'	(Report)	Tóth (yellow card) 6'; Heinz (yellow card) 42'; Rodenbücher (yellow card) 78'; Stanić (yellow card) 87'; Andrezinho 90+1'

Révesz Géza Stadion, Siófok
Attendance: 500
Referee: Tamás Bognár
- BFC Siófok: Szalma – Márton, Ludánszki (Tusori 68.), Horváth, László (Lukács 85.) – Kocsis, Pécseli, Thiago, Piller – Csermelyi, Délczeg (Ivancsics 74.). Coach: István Mihalecz.
- Ferencvárosi TC: Ranilović – Rodenbücher, Csizmadia, Junior (Andrezinho 46.) – Kulcsár, Józsi, Stanic, Tóth – Rósa, Heinz (Miljkovic 46.), Abdi (Morales 62.). Coach: László Prukner.
- G.: László (7. – pen.), Csermelyi (45., 68.) – Andrezinho (90.+1)
- Y.: Piller (90.) – Tóth (6.), Heinz (42.), Rodenbücher (78.), Stanic (87.)

==== Second leg ====
1 March 2011
18:00 CEST

Ferencvárosi TC	2–1 (0 – 0) ( 3 – 4 agg.)	BFC Siófok
Miljković (yellow card) 48'; Tóth 55'; Schembri 61' (yellow card) 65'; Tutorić (yellow card) 71'; Morales (yellow card) 86'	(Report)	Fehér (yellow card) 14'; Homma 51'; Mogyorósi (yellow card) 67'; Lukács (yellow card) 70'; Horváth (yellow card) 92'

Stadion Albert Flórián, Budapest
Attendance: 2,000
Referee: Alvaro Miquel Garcia
- Ferencvárosi TC: Haber – Csizmadia, Tutoric, Balog – Rósa, Maróti, Andrezinho (Morales 46.), Józsi (Tóth 54.) – Schembri, Heinz (Abdi 54.), Miljkovic. Coach: László Prukner.
- BFC Siófok: Molnár – Mogyorósi, Fehér, Graszl, Novák – Tusori, Lukács (Kecskés 77.), Ludánszki (Márton 88.), Délczeg (Horváth 88.) – Homma, Csermelyi. Coach: István Mihalecz.
- G.: Tóth (55.), Schembri (61.) – Homma (51.)
- Y.: Miljkovic (48.), Schembri (65.), Tutoric (71.), Morales (86.) – Fehér (14.), Mogyorósi (67.), Lukács (70.), Horváth (92.)

BFC Siófok won 4–3 on aggregate.

== League Cup ==
=== Group stage ===
Pos	Team	Pld	W	D	L	GF	GA	GD	Pts	Qualification	SZO	FTC	LOP
1	Haladás	4	2	2	0	6	4	+2	8	Advance to knockout phase	—	1–1	2–1
2	Ferencváros	4	1	3	0	5	3	+2	6		0–0	—	4–2
3	Pápa	4	0	1	3	5	9	−4	1		2–3	0–0	—

28 July 2010
17:30 CEST

Lombard-Pápa TFC	0–0 (0 – 0)	Ferencvárosi TC
	(Report)	Pisanjuk (yellow card) 30'; Sváb (yellow card) 73'

Stadion Várkerti, Pápa
Attendance: 1,500
Referee: József Berger
- Lombard-Pápa TFC: L. Szűcs – G. Tóth, P. Bíró, Supic, A. Farkas (P. Takács 46.) – Zulevs (Quintero 57.), M. Mészáros, N. Heffler – Bárányos (Zs. Szabó 46.), Abwo (Jovánczai 46.), N. Tóth (Rebryk 46.). Coach: György Véber.
- Ferencvárosi TC: Mester – Vattai, Fülöp, Rodenbücher, Sváb (R. Szabó 74.) – Pisanjuk, P. Nagy (Berdó 77.), M. Papp (Nyilasi 46.), Bölcsföldi (Peszmeg 64.) – Pölöskey, Trakys (I. Kovács 58.). Coach: László Prukner.
- G.: —
- Y.: Pisanjuk (30.), Sváb (73.)

3 November 2010
18:00 CEST

Ferencvárosi TC	0–0 (0 – 0)	Szombathelyi Haladás
Jakimovski (yellow card) 14'; Vattai (yellow card) 27'	(Report)	Lengyel (yellow card) 50'; Tóth (yellow card) 58'; Devecseri (yellow card) 90'

Stadion Albert Flórián, Budapest
Attendance: 1,200
Referee: Ádám Radványi
- Ferencvárosi TC: Mester – Fitos, Stockley, Fülöp, Vattai – Bölcsföldi (Veron 57.), Gárdos (Vass 71.), Jakimovski (Nagy 76.) – Morales (Danquah 41.), Pölöskey, Abdi (Garcia 76.). Coach: László Prukner.
- Szombathelyi Haladás: Mursits – Rajos (Szvoboda 46.), Lengyel, Devecseri, Csontos (Szakály 59.) – Rácz (Hanzl 89.), Tóth, Obric (Iszlai 71.), Lattenstein (Gyurján 59.) – Simon, Fodrek. Coach: Zoltán Aczél.
- G.: —
- Y.: Jakimovski (14.), Vattai (27.) – Lengyel (50.), Tóth (58.), Devecseri (90.)

16 February 2011
12:45 CEST

Szombathelyi Haladás	1–1 (1 – 0)	Ferencvárosi TC
Sipos 43'; Á. Simon (yellow card) 58'	(Report)	Papp (yellow card) 43'; Pölöskey 93'

Rohonci úti Stadion, Szombathely
Attendance: 1,000
Referee: Szabolcs Szilasi
- Szombathelyi Haladás: Rózsa – Korolovszky, II Nagy (Lattenstein 73.), Oross (Devecseri 84.), Tóth – Sipos, Kenesei, Guzmics (Lengyel 70.), Csontos (Á. Simon 46.) – Fodrek (Irhás 46.), Rajos. Coach: Zoltán Aczél.
- Ferencvárosi TC: Jova – Sváb, Papp (Tóbiás 68.), Antal, Tóth – Fülöp, Vattai, Szabó (Gyürki 68.), Vass – Pölöskey, Peszmeg (Erdei 86.). Coach: Péter Lipcsei.
- G.: Sipos (43.) – Pölöskey (93.)
- Y.: Á. Simon (58.) – Papp (43.)

8 December 2010
13:00 CEST

Ferencvárosi TC	4–2 (2 – 1)	Lombard-Pápa TFC
Fitos 2'; B. Tóth 37'; Abdi 57'; Nyilasi 76'	(Report)	Dlusztus (yellow card) 36'; Venczel 40' 90'; G. Tóth (yellow card) 45'; Rajnay (yellow card) 72'; Bíró (yellow card) 86'

Stadion Albert Flórián, Budapest
Attendance: 1,000
Referee: József Berger
- Ferencvárosi TC: Mester – Jakimovski (Bölcsföldi 52.), Fülöp, Tutoric (A. Tóth 46.), Gárdos – B. Tóth (Junior 46.), Vattai, Morales (Abdi 46.), Vass – Fitos, Kulcsár (Nyilasi 70.). Coach: László Prukner.
- Lombard-Pápa TFC: Kovács – Tóth, Dlusztus (Karácsony 46.), Takács, Jovánczai – Gyömbér, Rajnay, Németh (Venczel 10.), Bíró – Fertea, Bali (Germán 46.). Coach: György Véber.
- G.: Fitos (2.), B. Tóth (37.), Abdi (57.), Nyilasi (76.) – Dlusztus (40., 90.)
- Y.: Dlusztus (36.), G. Tóth (45.), Rajnay (72.), Bíró (86.)
