= 2011–12 Ferencvárosi TC season =

Ferencvárosi TC
2011–12 season
- Chairman: Gábor Kubatov
- Manager: László Prukner (until 15 August 2011); Tamás Nagy (until 8 September 2011); Lajos Détári
- NB 1: 11.
- UEFA Europa League: Second qualifying round
- Hungarian Cup: Round of 16
- Hungarian League Cup: Group Stage
- Top goalscorer: League: Péter Pölöskey (5); All: Péter Pölöskey (7)
- Highest home attendance: 12,500 v Újpest (22 October 2011)
- Lowest home attendance: 200 v Siófok (16 November 2011)
Home colours	Away colours	Third colours

The 2011–12 season will be Ferencvárosi TC's 109th competitive season, 3rd consecutive season in the OTP Bank Liga and 112th year in existence as a football club.

== First team squad ==
Note: Flags indicate national team as defined under FIFA eligibility rules; some limited exceptions apply. Players may hold more than one non-FIFA nationality.

No.	Pos.	Nation	Player
1	GK	SLO	Marko Ranilović
3	DF	NED	Mark Otten
4	DF	HUN	Dániel Sváb
7	MF	BIH	Aleksandar Jovanović
8	MF	HUN	György Józsi
10	MF	HUN	Krisztián Lisztes
11	FW	HUN	Lóránt Oláh (on loan from Kaposvár)
13	DF	BRA	Júnior
14	MF	HUN	Dávid Holman
17	MF	HUN	Bence Batik
19	MF	SOM	Liban Abdi
20	MF	HUN	Dénes Rósa
21	MF	HUN	Norbert Zsivóczky
22	MF	HUN	Attila Busai
23	FW	HUN	Bence Varga
24	MF	HUN	Bálint Nyilasi

No.	Pos.	Nation	Player
25	MF	HUN	Béla Maróti
26	DF	HUN	Tamás Grúz
27	MF	HUN	Dávid Kulcsár
28	GK	HUN	Dávid Gyenes
29	DF	HUN	Noel Fülöp
35	MF	ARG	Héctor Morales
40	GK	HUN	Zoltán Végh
41	GK	HUN	Roland Kunsági
44	DF	CZE	Martin Klein
55	GK	HUN	Levente Jova
60	FW	HUN	Péter Pölöskey
77	MF	FIN	Juha Hakola
78	DF	HUN	Zoltán Balog
88	FW	BRA	Somália
97	FW	CRO	Marko Šimić
99	FW	HUN	Gergő Beliczky

== Transfers ==
=== Summer ===
In: Note: Flags indicate national team as defined under FIFA eligibility rules; some limited exceptions apply. Players may hold more than one non-FIFA nationality.

No.	Pos.	Nation	Player
3	DF	NED	Mark Otten (from (Netherlands) NEC Nijmegen)
7	MF	BIH	Aleksandar Jovanović (from (Serbia) Hajduk Kula)
9	FW	BRA	Felipe Almeida Félix (from (Portugal) Leixões SC)
11	FW	SRB	Lóránt Oláh (loan from Kaposvári Rákóczi FC)
14	FW	JPN	Kazuo Homma (from Vasas SC)
17	FW	BRA	Alison (from Videoton FC II)
21	MF	HUN	Norbert Zsivóczky (from Diósgyőri VTK)
26	DF	HUN	Tamás Grúz (from Kaposvári Rákóczi FC)
27	MF	HUN	Krisztián Lisztes (from Vasas SC)
28	GK	HUN	Dávid Gyenes (from Vecsési FC)
36	MF	HUN	András Gárdos (loan return from (England) Sheffield United F.C.)
40	GK	HUN	Zoltán Végh (from Vasas SC)
44	DF	CZE	Martin Klein (from (Turkey) Konyaspor)
77	DF	FIN	Juha Hakola (from (Netherlands) Willem II)
87	MF	HUN	László Fitos (loan return from Szolnoki MÁV)
88	FW	BRA	Somália (from (Brazil) Bangu)
88	MF	HUN	Dávid Kulcsár (loan return from Vasas SC)

Out: Note: Flags indicate national team as defined under FIFA eligibility rules; some limited exceptions apply. Players may hold more than one non-FIFA nationality.

No.	Pos.	Nation	Player
7	FW	MKD	Nikola Jakimovski (to (Serbia) FK Javor Ivanjica)
9	FW	BRA	Felipe Almeida Félix (unattached)
10	MF	BRA	Andrezinho (to Ferencvárosi TC II)
12	GK	HUN	Tamás Mester (loan to BFC Siófok)
14	MF	SRB	Srđan Stanić (unattached)
15	DF	SRB	Đorđe Tutorić
17	FW	BRA	Alison (unattached)
18	FW	CZE	Marek Heinz (to (Czech Republic) Sigma Olomouc)
21	FW	BIH	Emil Miljković (to (Slovenia) NK Rudar Velenje)
23	GK	MLT	Justin Haber (to (Greece) Kerkyra)
26	DF	HUN	Attila Dragóner (to Jászapáti VSE)
27	MF	MLT	André Schembri (to (Greece) Olympiacos Volos)
88	MF	HUN	Dávid Kulcsár (to Vasas SC)

=== Winter ===
In: Note: Flags indicate national team as defined under FIFA eligibility rules; some limited exceptions apply. Players may hold more than one non-FIFA nationality.

No.	Pos.	Nation	Player
12	GK	HUN	Tamás Mester (loan return from BFC Siófok)
17	MF	HUN	Bence Batik (from Szeged 2011)
22	MF	HUN	Attila Busai (from (Switzerland) FC Wil)
27	MF	HUN	Dávid Kulcsár (from Vasas SC)
41	GK	HUN	Roland Kunsági (from Rákospalotai EAC)
88	FW	BRA	Somália (from (Brazil) Bangu AC)
99	FW	HUN	Gergő Beliczky (from Vasas SC)
—	MF	HUN	Márk Orosz (from Szeged 2011)

Out: Note: Flags indicate national team as defined under FIFA eligibility rules; some limited exceptions apply. Players may hold more than one non-FIFA nationality.

No.	Pos.	Nation	Player
9	FW	BRA	Felipe Félix (to (Brazil) Botafogo FC)
10	MF	BRA	Anderzinho (to (Brazil) Paysandu SC)
12	GK	HUN	Tamás Mester (on loan to Budaörsi SC)
14	FW	JPN	Kazuo Homma
17	FW	BRA	Alison
17	FW	HUN	Viktor Bölcsföldi (on loan to Szigetszentmiklósi TK)
30	MF	HUN	Bence Tóth (to Lombard-Pápa TFC)
85	DF	HUN	Csaba Csizmadia (to Gyirmót SE)
87	MF	HUN	László Fitos (to Gyirmót SE)
88	FW	BRA	Somália (loan return to (Brazil) Bangu AC)

- List of Hungarian football transfer summer 2011
- List of Hungarian football transfers winter 2011–12

== Statistics ==
=== Appearances and goals ===
Last updated on 27 May 2012.

No.	Pos	Nat	Player	Total		OTP Bank Liga		Europa League		Hungarian Cup		League Cup	
No.	Pos	Nat	Player	Apps	Goals	Apps	Goals	Apps	Goals	Apps	Goals	Apps	Goals
1	GK	(Slovenia) SLO	Marko Ranilović	10	-11	5	-5	4	-4	0	0	1	-2
3	DF	(Netherlands) NED	Mark Otten	29	3	22	1	4	1	3	1	0	0
4	DF	(Hungary) HUN	Dániel Sváb	12	0	12	0	0	0	0	0	0	0
7	MF	(Bosnia and Herzegovina) BIH	Aleksandar Jovanović	31	1	25	1	3	0	3	0	0	0
8	MF	(Hungary) HUN	György Józsi	23	2	15	0	3	1	3	1	2	0
10	MF	(Hungary) HUN	Krisztián Lisztes	27	2	23	1	0	0	2	0	2	1
11	FW	(Hungary) HUN	Lóránt Oláh	24	6	16	2	4	3	2	0	2	1
13	DF	(Brazil) BRA	Júnior	33	1	25	0	4	0	3	1	1	0
14	MF	(Hungary) HUN	Dávid Holman	2	0	1	0	0	0	0	0	1	0
17	MF	(Hungary) HUN	Bence Batik	1	0	1	0	0	0	0	0	0	0
19	MF	(Somalia) SOM	Liban Abdi	19	3	11	1	4	2	3	0	1	0
20	MF	(Hungary) HUN	Dénes Rósa	21	1	15	1	2	0	2	0	2	0
21	MF	(Hungary) HUN	Norbert Zsivóczky	11	0	6	0	0	0	0	0	5	0
22	MF	(Hungary) HUN	Attila Busai	7	1	7	1	0	0	0	0	0	0
23	FW	(Hungary) HUN	Bence Varga	2	0	1	0	0	0	0	0	1	0
24	MF	(Hungary) HUN	Bálint Nyilasi	6	2	1	0	0	0	0	0	5	2
25	MF	(Hungary) HUN	Béla Maróti	21	0	15	0	4	0	1	0	1	0
26	DF	(Hungary) HUN	Tamás Grúz	22	2	14	2	4	0	0	0	4	0
27	MF	(Hungary) HUN	Dávid Kulcsár	9	1	9	1	0	0	0	0	0	0
28	GK	(Hungary) HUN	Dávid Gyenes	3	-4	3	-4	0	0	0	0	0	0
29	DF	(Hungary) HUN	Noel Fülöp	12	0	7	0	3	0	0	0	2	0
35	MF	(Argentina) ARG	Héctor Morales	11	0	5	0	3	0	0	0	3	0
40	GK	(Hungary) HUN	Zoltán Végh	3	-5	1	-2	0	0	0	0	2	-3
41	GK	(Hungary) HUN	Roland Kunsági	1	-2	1	-2	0	0	0	0	0	0
44	DF	(Czech Republic) CZE	Martin Klein	25	3	21	3	0	0	3	0	1	0
55	GK	(Hungary) HUN	Levente Jova	24	-25	20	-19	0	0	3	-4	1	-2
60	FW	(Hungary) HUN	Péter Pölöskey	29	7	23	5	0	0	3	1	3	1
77	MF	(Finland) FIN	Juha Hakola	21	3	19	3	0	0	2	0	0	0
78	DF	(Hungary) HUN	Zoltán Balog	32	0	25	0	3	0	3	0	1	0
88	FW	(Brazil) BRA	Somalia	18	6	15	4	0	0	3	2	0	0
97	FW	(Croatia) CRO	Marko Šimić	8	2	8	2	0	0	0	0	0	0
99	FW	(Hungary) HUN	Gergő Beliczky	10	1	10	1	0	0	0	0	0	0
Players currently out on loan
17	FW	(Hungary) HUN	Viktor Bölcsföldi	3	0	0	0	0	0	0	0	3	0
Youth players
3	DF	(Hungary) HUN	Zsombor Nyárasdi	2	0	0	0	0	0	0	0	2	0
5	DF	(Hungary) HUN	Adrián Nagy	3	0	0	0	0	0	0	0	3	0
7	MF	(Hungary) HUN	Roland Szabó	4	0	0	0	0	0	0	0	4	0
9	MF	(Hungary) HUN	Máté Papp	4	0	0	0	0	0	0	0	4	0
11	DF	(Hungary) HUN	János Birtalan	2	0	0	0	0	0	0	0	2	0
15	FW	(Hungary) HUN	Zsolt Antal	3	0	0	0	0	0	0	0	3	0
18	MF	(Hungary) HUN	András Gárdos	3	0	0	0	0	0	0	0	3	0
31	GK	(Hungary) HUN	Bence Hermány	3	-7	0	0	0	0	0	0	3	-7
33	DF	(Hungary) HUN	Balázs Vattai	1	0	0	0	0	0	0	0	1	0
51	MF	(Hungary) HUN	Máté Vass	2	0	0	0	0	0	0	0	2	0
72	GK	(Hungary) HUN	Gábor Rigó	1	0	0	0	0	0	0	0	1	0
77	FW	(Hungary) HUN	Péter Pölöskei	4	0	0	0	0	0	0	0	4	0
90	MF	(Hungary) HUN	Viktor Peszmeg	2	0	0	0	0	0	0	0	2	0
--	MF	(Hungary) HUN	Axel Tóth	2	0	0	0	0	0	0	0	2	0
--	MF	(Hungary) HUN	Sándor Oláh	1	0	0	0	0	0	0	0	1	0
Players no longer at the club
9	FW	(Brazil) BRA	Felipe Félix	11	2	6	1	4	1	0	0	1	0
10	MF	(Brazil) BRA	Andrezinho	8	0	3	0	4	0	0	0	1	0
14	FW	(Japan) JPN	Kazuo Homma	3	0	0	0	0	0	0	0	3	0
17	FW	(Brazil) BRA	Alison	2	0	1	0	0	0	0	0	1	0
22	DF	(Hungary) HUN	István Rodenbücher	2	0	1	0	1	0	0	0	0	0
30	MF	(Hungary) HUN	Bence Tóth	16	1	14	1	0	0	1	0	1	0
85	DF	(Hungary) HUN	Csaba Csizmadia	15	1	9	0	2	0	1	1	3	0
87	MF	(Hungary) HUN	László Fitos	6	1	1	0	0	0	0	0	5	1

=== Top scorers ===
Includes all competitive matches. The list is sorted by shirt number when total goals are equal.

Last updated on 27 May 2012

Position	Nation	Number	Name	OTP Bank Liga	European League	Hungarian Cup	League Cup	Total
1	(Hungary)	60	Péter Pölöskey	5	0	1	1	7
2	(Brazil)	88	Somalia	4	0	2	0	6
3	(Hungary) (Serbia)	11	Lóránt Oláh	2	3	0	1	6
4	(Somalia) (Norway)	19	Liban Abdi	1	2	0	0	3
5	(Finland)	77	Juha Hakola	3	0	0	0	3
6	(Czech Republic)	44	Martin Klein	3	0	0	0	3
7	(Netherlands)	3	Mark Otten	1	1	1	0	3
8	(Brazil)	9	Felipe Félix	1	1	0	0	2
9	(Croatia)	97	Marko Šimić	2	0	0	0	2
10	(Hungary)	26	Tamás Grúz	2	0	0	0	2
11	(Hungary)	8	György Józsi	0	1	1	0	2
12	(Hungary)	10	Krisztián Lisztes	1	0	0	1	2
13	(Hungary)	24	Bálint Nyilasi	0	0	0	2	2
14	(Hungary)	20	Dénes Rósa	1	0	0	0	1
15	(Hungary)	30	Bence Tóth	1	0	0	0	1
16	(Bosnia and Herzegovina)	7	Aleksandar Jovanović	1	0	0	0	1
17	(Hungary)	27	Dávid Kulcsár	1	0	0	0	1
18	(Hungary)	99	Gergő Beliczky	1	0	0	0	1
19	(Hungary)	22	Attila Busai	1	0	0	0	1
20	(Hungary) (Romania)	85	Csaba Csizmadia	0	0	1	0	1
21	(Brazil)	13	Júnior	0	0	1	0	1
22	(Hungary)	87	László Fitos	0	0	0	1	1
/	/	/	Own Goals	0	0	0	0	0
			TOTALS	31	8	6	6	51

=== Disciplinary record ===
Includes all competitive matches. Players with 1 card or more included only.

Last updated on 27 May 2012

Position	Nation	Number	Name	OTP Bank Liga		Europea League		Hungarian Cup		League Cup		Total (Hu Total)	
Position	Nation	Number	Name	Yellow card	Red card	Yellow card	Red card	Yellow card	Red card	Yellow card	Red card	Yellow card	Red card
GK	(Slovenia)	1	Marko Ranilović	0	0	0	0	0	0	0	1	0 (0)	1 (0)
DF	(Netherlands)	3	Mark Otten	2	0	0	0	2	0	0	0	4 (2)	0 (0)
DF	(Hungary)	3	Zsombor Nyárasdi	0	0	0	0	0	0	1	0	1 (0)	0 (0)
DF	(Hungary)	4	Dániel Sváb	0	1	0	0	0	0	0	0	0 (0)	1 (1)
MF	(Bosnia and Herzegovina)	7	Aleksandar Jovanović	8	0	1	0	1	0	0	0	10 (8)	0 (0)
MF	(Hungary)	8	György Józsi	3	0	0	0	1	0	0	0	4 (3)	0 (0)
FW	(Brazil)	9	Felipe Félix	4	0	1	0	0	0	1	0	6 (4)	0 (0)
MF	(Hungary)	10	Krisztián Lisztes	3	0	0	0	0	0	0	0	3 (3)	0 (0)
MF	(Brazil)	10	Andrezinho	1	0	0	0	0	0	0	0	1 (1)	0 (0)
FW	(Hungary) (Serbia)	11	Lóránt Oláh	1	0	0	0	0	0	0	0	1 (1)	0 (0)
DF	(Brazil)	13	Júnior	7	0	1	0	0	0	0	0	8 (7)	0 (0)
FW	(Japan)	14	Kazuo Homma	0	0	0	0	0	0	1	0	1 (0)	0 (0)
FW	(Hungary)	15	Zsolt Antal	0	0	0	0	0	0	1	0	1 (0)	0 (0)
MF	(Hungary)	16	Sándor Oláh	0	0	0	0	0	0	0	1	0 (0)	1 (0)
MF	(Hungary)	17	Bence Batik	1	0	0	0	0	0	0	0	1 (1)	0 (0)
FW	(Brazil)	17	Alison	0	0	0	0	0	0	0	1	0 (0)	1 (0)
MF	(Somalia) (Norway)	19	Liban Abdi	1	1	0	0	0	0	0	0	1 (1)	1 (1)
MF	(Hungary)	20	Dénes Rósa	0	0	0	0	0	0	1	0	1 (0)	0 (0)
MF	(Hungary)	22	Attila Busai	3	0	0	0	0	0	0	0	3 (3)	0 (0)
MF	(Hungary)	25	Béla Maróti	3	0	2	0	0	0	0	0	5 (3)	0 (0)
DF	(Hungary)	26	Tamás Grúz	5	1	2	0	0	0	2	0	9 (5)	1 (1)
MF	(Hungary)	27	Dávid Kulcsár	2	0	0	0	0	0	0	0	2 (1)	0 (0)
DF	(Hungary)	29	Noel Fülöp	0	0	1	0	0	0	0	0	1 (0)	0 (0)
MF	(Hungary)	30	Bence Tóth	1	0	0	0	0	0	0	0	1 (1)	0 (0)
MF	(Argentina)	35	Héctor Morales	1	0	0	0	0	0	1	0	2 (1)	0 (0)
DF	(Czech Republic)	44	Martin Klein	4	0	0	0	0	0	0	0	4 (4)	0 (0)
GK	(Hungary)	55	Levente Jova	1	0	0	0	0	1	0	0	1 (1)	1 (0)
FW	(Hungary)	60	Péter Pölöskey	6	0	0	0	2	0	1	0	9 (6)	0 (0)
MF	(Finland)	77	Juha Hakola	1	0	0	0	1	0	0	0	2 (1)	0 (0)
DF	(Hungary)	78	Zoltán Balog	5	1	0	0	0	0	0	0	5 (5)	1 (1)
DF	(Hungary) (Romania)	85	Csaba Csizmadia	1	0	0	0	0	0	0	0	1 (1)	0 (0)
FW	(Brazil)	88	Somália	4	0	0	0	0	0	0	0	4 (4)	0 (0)
			TOTALS	68	4	8	0	7	1	9	3	92 (68)	8 (4)

=== Overall ===
Games played	43 (30 OTP Bank Liga, 4 UEFA Europa League, 3 Hungarian Cup and 6 Hungarian League Cup)
Games won	13 (9 OTP Bank Liga, 3 UEFA Europa League, 1 Hungarian Cup and 0 Hungarian League Cup)
Games drawn	10 (7 OTP Bank Liga, 0 UEFA Europa League, 2 Hungarian Cup and 1 Hungarian League Cup)
Games lost	20 (14 OTP Bank Liga, 1 UEFA Europa League, 0 Hungarian Cup and 5 Hungarian League Cup)
Goals scored	52
Goals conceded	57
Goal difference	−5
Yellow cards	92
Red cards	8
Worst discipline	(Hungary) Tamás Grúz (9 (yellow card) , 1 (red card) )
Best result	3–0 (H) v Ulisses – UEFA Europa League – 30-06-2011
Best result	3–0 (H) v Újpest FC – OTP Bank Liga – 22-10-2011
Best result	5–2 (A) v Szolnoki MÁV FC – Hungarian Cup – 26-10-2011
Worst result	1–4 (H) v Pécsi Mecsek FC – Hungarian League Cup – 07-09-2011
Most appearances	(Brazil) Júnior (33 appearances)
Top scorer	(Hungary) Péter Pölöskey (7 goals)
Points	49/129 (37.99%)

Last updated: 27 May 2012

== Nemzeti Bajnokság I ==
=== Matches ===
17 July 2011 1	Kaposvári Rákóczi FC	2–2	Ferencvárosi TC	Kaposvár, Somogy County
18:00 CET (UTC+01)	Okuka 5'; Perić 73'	(Report)	Félix 26'; Otten 83'	Stadium: Stadion Kaposvár Rákóczi; Attendance: 4,500; Referee: (Hungary) Viktor Kassai

24 July 2011 2	Ferencvárosi TC	1–1	Diósgyőri VTK	Budapest, Pest County
18:00 CET (UTC+01)	Abdi 4'	(Report)	Luque 69'	Stadium: Stadion Albert Flórián; Attendance: 6,000; Referee: (Chile) Alvaro Garcia Miquel

31 July 2011 3	Debreceni VSC	1–0	Ferencvárosi TC	Debrecen, Hajdú-Bihar County
18:00 CET (UTC+01)	Bódi 45'	(Report)		Stadium: Stadion Oláh Gábor Út; Attendance: 9,000; Referee: (Hungary) Zoltán Iványi

7 August 2011 4	Ferencvárosi TC	0–1	Pécsi Mecsek FC	Budapest, Pest County
16:00 CET (UTC+01)		(Report)	Nagy 83'	Stadium: Stadion Albert Flórián; Attendance: 4,000; Referee: (Hungary) Mihly Fábián

13 August 2011 5	Budapest Honvéd FC	1–0	Ferencvárosi TC	Budapest, Pest County
20:00 CET (UTC+01)	Németh 73'	(Report)		Stadium: Bozsik Stadion; Attendance: 5,500; Referee: (Hungary) Tamás Bognár

21 August 2011 6	Ferencvárosi TC	1–2	Szombathelyi Haladás	Budapest, Pest County
18:00 CET (UTC+01)	Rósa 72' (pen.)	(Report)	Vujović 5'; Halmosi 56'	Stadium: Stadion Albert Flórián; Attendance: 3,500; Referee: (Hungary) Zoltán Iványi

28 August 2011 7	Vasas SC	2–0	Ferencvárosi TC	Budapest, Pest County
18:00 CET (UTC+01)	Kovács 5'; Bárányos 69'	(Report)		Stadium: Stadion Puskás Ferenc; Attendance: 3,500; Referee: (Hungary) Szabolcs Szilasi

11 September 2011 8	Ferencvárosi TC	2–0	Zalaegerszegi TE	Budapest, Pest County
18:00 CET (UTC+01)	Oláh 66'; Tóth 75'	(Report)		Stadium: Stadion Albert Flórián; Attendance: 4,000; Referee: (Hungary) Zsolt Szabó

18 September 2011 9	Győri ETO FC	2–0	Ferencvárosi TC	Győr, Győr-Moson-Sopron County
18:00 CET (UTC+01)	Aleksidze 16'; Trajković 23'	(Report)		Stadium: ETO Park; Attendance: 9,000; Referee: (Hungary) Tamás Bognár

25 September 2011 10	Kecskeméti TE	1–0	Ferencvárosi TC	Kecskemét, Bács-Kiskun County
16:00 CET (UTC+01)	Lencse 33'	(Report)		Stadium: Széktói Stadion; Attendance: 6,000; Referee: (Hungary) Péter Solymosi

2 October 2011 11	Ferencvárosi TC	0–1	Videoton FC	Budapest, Pest County
18:00 CET (UTC+01)		(Report)	Alves 14'	Stadium: Stadion Albert Flórián; Attendance: 5,000; Referee: (Hungary) Viktor Kassai

16 October 2011 12	Lombard-Pápa TFC	1–2	Ferencvárosi TC	Pápa, Veszprém County
18:00 CET (UTC+01)	Marić 47'	(Report)	Somália 54'; Klein 74'	Stadium: Stadion Várkerti; Attendance: 4,500; Referee: (Hungary) Mihály Fábián

22 October 2011 13	Ferencvárosi TC	3–0	Újpest FC	Budapest, Pest County
15:00 CET (UTC+01)	Pölöskey 7'; Somália 38'; Lisztes 90+2'	(Report)		Stadium: Stadion Albert Flórián; Attendance: 12,500; Referee: (Hungary) Viktor Kassai

30 October 2011 14	BFC Siófok	0–2	Ferencvárosi TC	Siófok, Somogy County
18:00 CET (UTC+01)		(Report)	Pölöskey 26'; Hakola 75'	Stadium: Révész Street Stadium; Attendance: 3,500; Referee: (Hungary) Zoltán Iványi

6 November 2011 15	Ferencvárosi TC	0–0	Paksi SE	Budapest, Pest County
18:00 CET (UTC+01)		(Report)		Stadium: Stadion Albert Flórián; Attendance: 9,000; Referee: (Hungary) Sándor Andó-Szabó

20 November 2011 16	Ferencvárosi TC	0–0	Kaposvári Rákóczi FC	Budapest, Pest County
18:00 CET (UTC+01)		(Report)		Stadium: Stadion Albert Flórián; Attendance: 2,000; Referee: (Hungary) Ádám Németh

27 November 2011 17	Diósgyőri VTK	2–3	Ferencvárosi TC	Miskolc, Borsod-Abaúj-Zemplén County
18:00 CET (UTC+01)	Seydi 16'; Luque 38'	(Report)	Somália 23' 58'; Pölöskey 52'	Stadium: DVTK Stadion; Attendance: 11,398; Referee: (Hungary) Péter Solymosi

3 March 2012 18	Ferencvárosi TC	1–2	Debreceni VSC	Budapest, Pest County
17:30 CET (UTC+01)	Klein 54'	(Report)	Coulibaly 42'; Szakály 80'	Stadium: Stadion Albert Flórián; Attendance: 9,300; Referee: (Hungary) Tamás Bognár

11 March 2012 19	Pécsi Mecsek FC	0–2	Ferencvárosi TC	Pécs, Baranya County
16:00 CET (UTC+01)		(Report)	Jovanović 6'; Pölöskey 90+2'	Stadium: Stadion PMFC; Attendance: 9,000; Referee: (Hungary) Mihály Fábián

18 March 2012 20	Ferencvárosi TC	0–0	Budapest Honvéd FC	Budapest, Pest County
18:00 CET (UTC+01)		(Report)		Stadium: Stadion Albert Flórián; Attendance: 7,000; Referee: (Hungary) Zsolt Szabó

25 March 2012 21	Szombathelyi Haladás	2–1	Ferencvárosi TC	Szombathely, Vas County
18:00 CET (UTC+01)	Kenesei 86' (pen.) 90+2'	(Report)	Kulcsár 56'	Stadium: Rohonci Street Stadium; Attendance: 8,000; Referee: (Hungary) Viktor Kassai

31 March 2012 22	Ferencvárosi TC	1–0	Vasas SC	Budapest, Pest County
15:00 CET (UTC+01)	Pölöskey 45' (pen.)	(Report)		Stadium: Stadion Albert Flórián; Attendance: 5,500; Referee: (Hungary) Sándor Andó-Szabó

8 April 2012 23	Zalaegerszegi TE	2–3	Ferencvárosi TC	Zalaegerszeg, Zala County
18:00 CET (UTC+01)	Kocsárdi 42'; Máté 42'	(Report)	Šimić 61'; Hakola 71' 90+2'	Stadium: ZTE Arena; Attendance: 4,286; Referee: (Hungary) Tamás Bognár

14 April 2012 24	Ferencvárosi TC	2–2	Győri ETO FC	Budapest, Pest County
17:30 CET (UTC+01)	Beliczky 21'; Busai 79'	(Report)	Trajković 15'; Đorđević 24'	Stadium: Stadion Albert Flórián; Attendance: 6,000; Referee: (Hungary) Zoltán Iványi

21 April 2012 25	Ferencvárosi TC	3–0	Kecskeméti TE	Budapest, Pest County
17:30 CET (UTC+01)	Šimić 1'; Grúz 32'	(Report)	Litsingi 47'	Stadium: Stadion Albert Flórián; Attendance: 6,000; Referee: (Hungary) Péter Solymosi

29 April 2012 26	Videoton FC	2–0	Ferencvárosi TC	Székesfehérvár, Fejér County
16:00 CET (UTC+01)	Nikolić 67'; Mitrović 78' (pen.)	(Report)		Stadium: Sóstói Stadion; Attendance: 9,500; Referee: (Hungary) Mihály Fábián

5 May 2012 27	Ferencvárosi TC	0–2	Lombard-Pápa TFC	Budapest, Pest County
17:30 CET (UTC+01)		(Report)	Lovrencsics 15' 31'	Stadium: Stadion Albert Flórián; Attendance: 3,417; Referee: (Hungary) József Berger

12 May 2012 28	Újpest FC	1–1	Ferencvárosi TC	Budapest, Pest County
15:00 CET (UTC+01)	Vasiljević 82' (pen.)	(Report)	Grúz 22'	Stadium: Szusza Ferenc Stadium; Attendance: 10,000; Referee: (Hungary) Viktor Kassai

19 May 2012 29	Ferencvárosi TC	0–1	BFC Siófok	Budapest, Pest County
15:00 CET (UTC+01)		(Report)	Simon 85'	Stadium: Stadion Albert Flórián; Attendance: 6,000; Referee: (Hungary) Szabolcs Szilasi

26 May 2012 30	Paksi SE	4–2	Ferencvárosi TC	Paks, Tolna County
15:00 CET (UTC+01)	Böde 10'; Kiss 35' 37'; Szatmári 47'	(Report)	Klein 18'; Oláh 20'	Stadium: Stadion PSE; Attendance: 4,100; Referee: (Hungary) Péter Solymosi

=== Classification ===
Pos	Team	Pld	W	D	L	GF	GA	GD	Pts
9	Siófok	30	9	9	12	30	41	−11	36
10	Kaposvár	30	7	14	9	35	42	−7	35
11	Ferencváros	30	9	7	14	32	35	−3	34
12	Pécs	30	8	10	12	36	50	−14	34
13	Újpest	30	8	8	14	34	46	−12	32

Source: MLSZ (in Hungarian)
Rules for classification: 1st points; 2nd overall wins; 3rd goal difference; 4th goals scored

=== Results summary ===
Overall								Home						Away					
Pld	W	D	L	GF	GA	GD	Pts	W	D	L	GF	GA	GD	W	D	L	GF	GA	GD
30	9	7	14	31	36	−5	34	4	5	6	13	13	0	5	2	8	18	23	−5

Last updated: 27 May 2012.
Source: NB1

=== Results by round ===
Round	1	2	3	4	5	6	7	8	9	10	11	12	13	14	15	16	17	18	19	20	21	22	23	24	25	26	27	28	29	30
Ground	A	H	A	H	A	H	A	H	A	A	H	A	H	A	H	H	A	H	A	H	A	H	A	H	H	A	H	A	H	A
Result	D	D	L	L	L	L	L	W	L	L	L	W	W	W	D	D	W	L	W	D	L	W	W	D	W	L	L	D	L	L
Position	7	10	12	12	13	13	14	15	15	15	15	15	13	12	10	11	9	9	9	9	10	9	9	9	9	9	10	9	10	11

Updated to match(es) played on 27 May 2012. Source: Matches
A = Away; H = Home; W = Win; D = Draw; L = Loss

== Hungarian Cup ==
26 October 2011 4	Szolnoki MÁV FC	2–5	Ferencvárosi TC	Szolnok, Jász-Nagykun-Szolnok County
14:00	Kalmár 31'; Tóth 37'	(Report)	Pölöskey 9'; Somália 21' 41'; Józsi 26' (pen.); Csizmadia 68'	Stadium: Tiszaligeti Stadion; Attendance: 1,500; Referee: (Hungary) József Berger

=== Round of 16 ===
30 November 2011 1st leg	Békéscsaba 1912 Előre SE	0–0	Ferencvárosi TC	Békéscsaba, Békés County
18:00		(Report)		Stadium: Stadion Kórház utcai Attendance: 7,000; Referee: (Hungary) Mihály Fábián

3 December 2011 2nd leg	Ferencvárosi TC	2–2 (2–2 agg.)	Békéscsaba 1912 Előre SE	Budapest, Pest County
15:00	Júnior 5' (pen.); Otten 55'	(Report)	Makra 31'; Leucuţă 76' (pen.)	Stadium: Stadion Albert Flórián; Attendance: 2,100; Referee: (Chile) Alvaro Miquel Garcia

== League Cup ==
=== Matches ===
31 August 2011 1	BFC Siófok	2–1	Ferencvárosi TC	Siófok, Somogy County
18:00	Lengyel 14'; Sowunmi 62'	(Report)	Pölöskey 20'	Stadium: Révész Street Stadium; Attendance: 500; Referee: (Hungary) Ádám Radványi

7 September 2011 2	Ferencvárosi TC	1–4	Pécsi Mecsek FC	Budapest, Pest County
20:00	Nyilasi 30'	(Report)	Bajzát 5'; Andorka 7'; Antal 34' (o.g.); Demjén 65'	Stadium: Stadion Albert Flórián; Attendance: 1,500; Referee: (Hungary) Tibor Farkas

5 October 2011 3	Ferencvárosi TC	0–2	Kaposvári Rákóczi FC	Budapest, Pest County
18:00		(Report)	Grumić 38' 65'	Stadium: Stadion Albert Flórián; Attendance: 250; Referee: (Hungary) Balázs Berke

12 October 2011 4	Kaposvári Rákóczi FC	2–2	Ferencvárosi TC	Kaposvár, Somogy County
18:00	Pavlović 28' (pen.); Haruna 46'	(Report)	Fitos 42'; Nyilasi 87'	Stadium: Stadion Kaposvár Rákóczi; Attendance: 600; Referee: (Hungary) Balázs Böcskei

10 November 2011 5	Pécsi Mecsek FC	2–1	Ferencvárosi TC	Pécs, Baranya County
18:00	Pákolicz 3'; Šćepanović 55'	(Report)	Lisztes 17'	Stadium: Stadion PMFC; Attendance: 400; Referee: (Hungary) Ádám Farkas

16 November 2011 6	Ferencvárosi TC	1–2	BFC Siófok	Budapest, Pest County
19:00	Oláh 56' (pen.)	(Report)	Fejes 52'; Melczer 60' (pen.)	Stadium: Stadion Albert Flórián; Attendance: 200; Referee: (Hungary) József Erdős

=== Classification ===
Pos	Team	Pld	W	D	L	GF	GA	GD	Pts	Qualification
1	Kaposvári Rákóczi FC	6	4	1	1	9	5	+4	13	Advance to knockout phase
2	Pécsi Mecsek	6	3	1	2	10	6	+4	10	
3	Siófok	6	3	1	2	7	7	0	10	
4	Ferencvárosi TC	6	0	1	5	6	13	−7	1	

Rules for classification: 1) points; 2) goal difference; 3) number of goals scored.

== Europa League ==
The First and Second Qualifying Round draws took place at UEFA headquarters in Nyon, Switzerland on 20 June 2011.

30 June 2011 Q1 Leg 1	Ferencvárosi TC (Hungary)	3–0	(Armenia) Ulisses	Budapest
19:00 CEST	Józsi 31'; Otten 33'; Félix 69'	(Report)		Stadium: Stadion Albert Flórián; Attendance: 6,600; Referee: (Slovenia) Slavko Vinčić

7 July 2011 Q1 Leg 2	Ulisses (Armenia)	0–2 (0–5 agg.)	(Hungary) Ferencvárosi TC	Yerevan
16:00 CEST		(Report)	Abdi 35' (pen.); Oláh 90+7'	Stadium: Hrazdan Stadium; Attendance: 1,500; Referee: (Ukraine) Oleksandr Derbo

14 July 2011 Q2 Leg 1	Ferencvárosi TC (Hungary)	2–1	(Norway) Aalesunds FK	Budapest
19:00 CEST	Oláh 38'; Abdi 56'	(Report)	Okoronkwo 27'	Stadium: Stadion Albert Flórián; Attendance: 8,000; Referee: (Romania) Marius Avram

21 July 2011 Q2 Leg 2	Aalesunds FK (Norway)	3–1 (a.e.t.) (4–3 agg.)	(Hungary) Ferencvárosi TC	Ålesund
19:00 CEST	Barrantes 72' (pen.); Fuhre 87'; Post 119'	(Report)	Oláh 42'	Stadium: Color Line Stadion; Attendance: 5,122; Referee: (Poland) Szymon Marciniak

== Pre Season (Winter) ==
24 January 2012	Ferencvárosi TC	1–3	FC Viitorul Constanța (Romania)	Belek, Turkey
	Varga 85'	(Report)	Rusu 9' 26' 50' (pen.)

24 January 2012	Ferencvárosi TC	1–1	Azerbaijan U-21	Belek, Turkey
	Pölöskey 43'	(Report)

27 January 2012	Ferencvárosi TC	2–5	FC Admira Wacker Mödling (Austria)	Belek, Turkey
	Pölöskey 10'; Batik	(Report)

31 January 2012	Ferencvárosi TC	0–3	Sociedade Esportiva Platinense (Brazil)	Budapest, Pest County
		(Report)	Valentim 36'; Éder 79' 81'	Stadium: Stadion Albert Flórián

5 February 2012	Ferencvárosi TC	1–2	Club Atlético River Plate (Argentina)	Detroit, United States
	Oláh 70' (pen.)	(Report)	Vila Ruís 1' 23'	Stadium: Silverdome; Attendance: 6,000

7 February 2012	Ferencvárosi TC	2–1	Vasas SC	Detroit, United States
	Pölöskey 3'; Lisztes 55'	(Report)	Hercegfalvi 17'	Stadium: Silverdome; Attendance: 1,300

18 February 2012	Egri FC	2–2	Ferencvárosi TC	Eger, Heves County
	Hristov 60' 87'	(Report)	Knakal 2' (o.g.); Gárdos 75'	Stadium: Szentmarjay Tibor Városi Stadion; Attendance: 700; Referee: (Hungary) Tyukodi

25 February 2012	Ferencvárosi TC	1–0	Soroksári SC	Budapest, Pest County
	Lisztes	(Report)		Stadium: Stadion Albert Flórián
