= Frank Wiafe Danquah =

Dutch footballer (born 1989)

Frank Wiafe
Personal information
- Full name: Frank Wiafe Danquah
- Date of birth: 14 October 1989 (age 37)
- Place of birth: Amsterdam, Netherlands
- Height: 1.85 m (6 ft 1 in)
- Position: Striker

Youth career
- 2003–2006: Ajax
- 2006–2008: Newcastle United

Senior career*
Years	Team	Apps	(Gls)
2008–2010	Newcastle United	0	(0)
2010	Ferencváros	0	(0)
2010	Ferencváros II	8	(1)
2010–2012	Waasland-Beveren	2	(0)
2012	Newcastle Benfield		
2012	Chabab	10	(1)
2013	Brașov	8	(1)
2013	Târgu Mureș	5	(0)
2014–2015	Achilles '29	28	(3)
2015–2016	Lienden	28	(11)
2016	Fortuna Sittard	11	(0)
2017–2020	Lienden	78	(8)
2020–2021	NEC Amateurs		
2021–2022	DUNO		
- * Club domestic league appearances and goals as of 13:14, 9 March 2020 (UTC)

Frank Wiafe Danquah (born 14 October 1989) is a Dutch retired footballer of Ghanaian descent who played as a forward.

== Club career ==
Frank Wiafe Danquah began in the youth teams of Ajax Amsterdam in the Netherlands. He was given then a trial by Newcastle United and signed with them a youth contract in July 2006. He impressed in the reserves and became the reserves' topscorer and on 8 July 2008 he signed a 2-year professional contract with Newcastle United.

When Wiafe Danquah’s contract expired in the summer of 2010 he was not given a new contract and instead joined Ferencváros in Hungary. His contract with the club was disbanded though due to financial problems in late 2010. On 17 February 2011 he joined Waasland-Beveren in Belgium. In February 2013 he moved to Romania, when he signed a 6-month contract with Brașov.

In September 2014, Wiafe Danquah signed for Achilles '29 until the end of the 2014–15 season. He joined FC Lienden for the 2015/16 Topklasse season and moved to Eerste Divisie side Fortuna Sittard the next season, only to return to Lienden in January 2017.

On 5 February 2021, Wiafe Danquah signed with DUNO in the Hoofdklasse.
