= Adriano (footballer, born July 1985) =

Brazilian footballer

Personal information
- Full name: Adriano Alves dos Santos
- Date of birth: July 1, 1985 (age 41)
- Place of birth: Dourados, Brazil
- Height: 1.85 m (6 ft 1 in)
- Position: Centre back

Team information
- Current team: Treze

Senior career*
Years	Team	Apps	(Gls)
2007–2008	Náutico	17	(1)
2008–2010	Oeste	49	(2)
2010–2011	Ferencvárosi TC	10	(0)
2011–2012	Oeste	19	(0)
2012–2013	São Caetano	8	(0)
2013–2014	Oeste	47	(5)
2014–2015	Atlético Goianiense	3	(0)
2016	Najran	13	(3)
2016–2017	Al-Raed	8	(1)
2018	América RN	0	(0)
2018	Oeste	14	(0)
2019–2020	América RN	9	(1)
2019	→ Treze (loan)	7	(1)
2021–	Treze	0	(0)
- * Club domestic league appearances and goals as of 20:18, 19 February 2021 (UTC)

Adriano Alves dos Santos (born July 1, 1985) is a Brazilian football player who plays for Treze. He is André Alves' brother.
