= Aílton Júnior =

Brazilian footballer (born 1987)

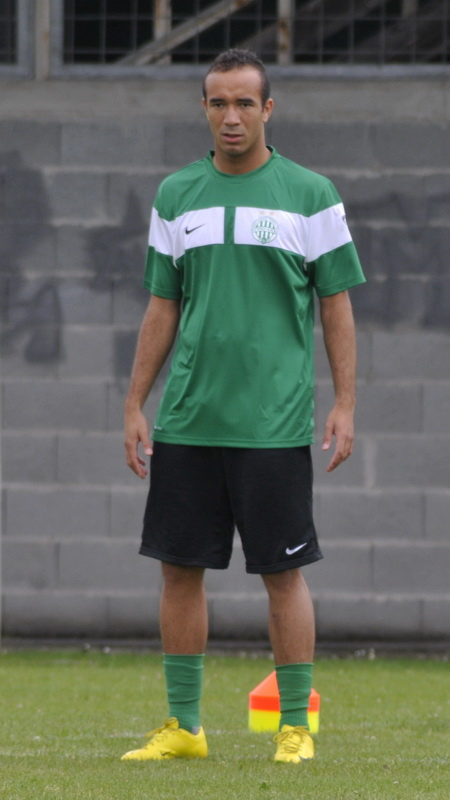

Personal information
- Full name: Jose Junior Pereira Ailton
- Date of birth: July 23, 1987 (age 39)
- Place of birth: Guariba, São Paulo, Brazil
- Height: 1.81 m (5 ft 11 1/2 in)
- Position: Defender

Youth career
- 2004–2005: Santos FC

Senior career*
Years	Team	Apps	(Gls)
2005–2007	Santos FC	1	(0)
2007–2008	Tupi FC (MG)	--	(0)
2008–2010	Kaposvári Rákóczi FC	39	(0)
2010–2012	Ferencvárosi TC	49	(0)
2010–2011	→ Ferencvárosi TC II	13	(0)
2012–2014	AZAL	57	(1)
2015–2017	Al-Najma	65	(5)
2017–2018	Budaiya Club	2	
- * Club domestic league appearances and goals as of 26 May 2014

Jose Junior Pereira Ailton (born July 23, 1987), better known as Aílton Júnior, is a Brazilian football player who most recently played for Azerbaijan Premier League side AZAL.

== Career ==
=== Brasil ===
Aílton passed a football school of Santos FC and began his career here, but was not able to become a major player. In 2007, at the age of 20 he went to Tupi FC and played Série C for the next 2 years.

=== Hungary ===
He was transferred to Kaposvári Rákóczi FC and after a brilliant season was signed by Ferencvárosi TC. In 2010, he played for the second team on a one-year loan, but was taken back after six months. For Ferencvárosi TC he capped 41 times.

=== AZAL ===
In July 2012, Aílton went on trial with Azerbaijan Premier League side AZAL. Following his first friendly match with the team he signed a two-year contract. Aílton was released by AZAL at the end of his contract, having played 57 times in all competitions for the club.

=== Career statistics ===
As of 6 May 2014

Club statistics
Season	Club	League	League		Cup		League Cup		Other		Total	
Season	Club	League	App	Goals	App	Goals	App	Goals	App	Goals	App	Goals
Hungary			League		Magyar Kupa		Ligakupa		Europe		Total	
2010-11	Ferencvárosi	Nemzeti Bajnokság I	16	0	1	0	1	0	-		18	0
2010-11	Ferencvárosi II	Nemzeti Bajnokság II	9	0	0	0	-		-		9	0
2011-12	Ferencvárosi	Nemzeti Bajnokság I	25	0	4	0	1	0	4	0	34	0
2011–12	Ferencvárosi II	Nemzeti Bajnokság II	1	0	0	0	-		-		1	0
Azerbaijan			League		Azerbaijan Cup		League Cup		Europe		Total	
2012–13	AZAL	Azerbaijan Premier League	27	0	1	0	-		-		28	0
2013–14	AZAL	Azerbaijan Premier League	28	0	1	0	-		-		29	0
Total	Hungary		51	0	4	0	2	0	4	0	65	0
Total	Azerbaijan		55	0	2	0	0	0	0	0	57	0
Total			106	0	6	0	2	0	4	0	122	0
