= Marko Ranilović =

Slovenian footballer

Personal information
- Date of birth: 25 November 1986 (age 39)
- Place of birth: Maribor, SFR Yugoslavia
- Height: 1.88 m (6 ft 2 in)
- Position: Goalkeeper

Youth career
- Železničar Maribor
- –2005: Maribor

Senior career*
Years	Team	Apps	(Gls)
2005–2010	Maribor	61	(0)
2005	→ Paloma (loan)	6	(0)
2010–2013	Ferencváros	25	(0)
2010–2012	Ferencváros II	7	(0)
2013	Kaposvár Rákóczi	11	(0)
2014	Zavrč	19	(0)
2015	Hajduk Split	3	(0)
2015	ViOn Zlaté Moravce	15	(0)
2016	Zavrč	8	(0)
2017	Železničar Maribor	0	(0)
2017–2020	SV Frannach	61	(1)
2020–2022	SV Union Sturm Klöch	11	(0)

International career
2001	Slovenia U15	6	(0)
2006–2007	Slovenia U20	6	(0)
2006–2008	Slovenia U21	4	(0)
- * Club domestic league appearances and goals

Marko Ranilović (born 25 November 1986) is a Slovenian retired footballer who played as a goalkeeper.

== Honours ==
Maribor

- Slovenian Championship: 2008–09
- Slovenian Cup: 2009–10
- Slovenian Supercup: 2009

Ferencváros

- Hungarian League Cup: 2012–13
