= Dániel Sváb =

Hungarian footballer

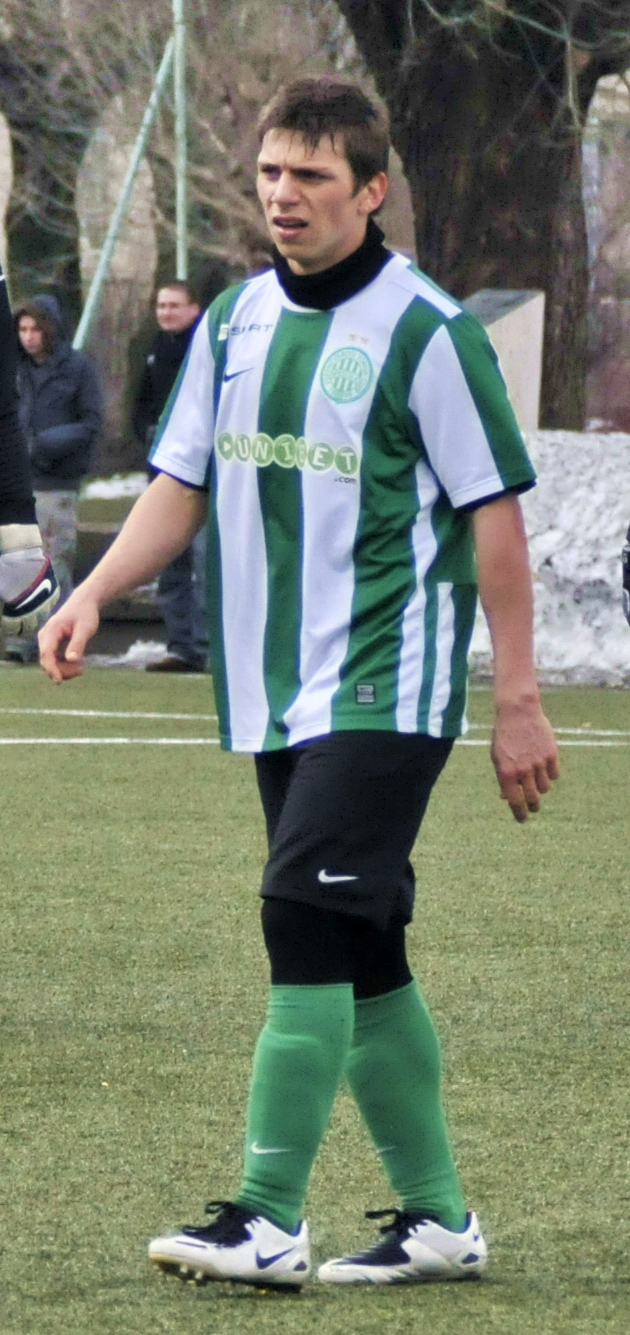
- Sváb in 2010

Personal information
- Full name: Dániel Sváb
- Date of birth: 2 September 1990 (age 36)
- Place of birth: Salgótarján, Hungary
- Height: 1.83 m (6 ft 0 in)
- Positions: Centre back; left back

Team information
- Current team: Leithaprodersdorf
- Number: 13

Youth career
- 2003–2004: Salgó Öblös SC
- 2004–2009: Ferencváros

Senior career*
Years	Team	Apps	(Gls)
2009–2013	Ferencváros	34	(0)
2013–2014	Energie Cottbus	8	(0)
2014–2015	Győri ETO	2	(0)
2015	Mezőkövesd-Zsóry SE	15	(0)
2015–2016	Szigetszentmiklósi TK	19	(0)
2016	Karmiotissa	0	(0)
2016–2017	Energie Cottbus	16	(0)

International career
2008–2009	Hungary U-19		
2010–2012	Hungary U-21	10	(0)
- * Club domestic league appearances and goals as of 25 August 2017

Dániel Sváb (born 2 September 1990 in Salgótarján) is a Hungarian football player.

== Career ==
He played his first league match in 2011.

On 22 August 2013, it was officially announced that Sváb signed for Energie Cottbus with a contract until 2015. He left Cottbus at the end of the 2013–14 season after they were relegated from the 2. Bundesliga.

== Career statistics ==
As of 19 February 2018

Appearances and goals by club, season and competition
Club	Season	League			Cup		League Cup		Europe		Total	
Club	Season	Division	Apps	!Goals	Apps	Goals	Apps	Goals	Apps	Goals	Apps	Goals
Ferencváros	2008–09	Nemzeti Bajnokság I	0	0	0	0	8	0	0	0	8	0
Ferencváros	2009–10	Nemzeti Bajnokság I	0	0	0	0	13	1	0	0	13	1
Ferencváros	2010–11	Nemzeti Bajnokság I	0	0	0	0	2	0	0	0	2	0
Ferencváros	2011–12	Nemzeti Bajnokság I	12	0	0	0	0	0	0	0	12	0
Ferencváros	2012–13	Nemzeti Bajnokság I	22	0	1	0	8	0	0	0	31	0
Ferencváros	Total		34	0	1	0	31	1	0	0	66	1
Energie Cottbus	2013–14	2. Bundesliga	8	0	0	0	–		–		8	0
Energie Cottbus	Total		8	0	0	0	–		0	0	8	0
Győr	2014–15	Nemzeti Bajnokság I	2	0	0	0	4	0	0	0	6	0
Győr	Total		2	0	0	0	4	0	0	0	6	0
Mezőkövesdi-Zsóry	2014–15	Nemzeti Bajnokság II	15	0	0	0	0	0	0	0	15	0
Mezőkövesdi-Zsóry	Total		15	0	0	0	0	0	0	0	15	0
Szigetszentmiklósi TK	2015–16	Nemzeti Bajnokság II	20	0	0	0	0	0	0	0	20	0
Szigetszentmiklósi TK	Total		20	0	0	0	0	0	0	0	20	0
Energie Cottbus	2016–17	Regionalliga Nordost	16	0	0	0	–		–		16	0
Energie Cottbus	Total		16	0	0	0	–		0	0	16	0
Career Total			95	0	1	0	35	1	0	0	131	1

== Honours ==
Ferencváros

- Hungarian League Cup (1): 2012–13
