= László Fitos =

Hungarian footballer

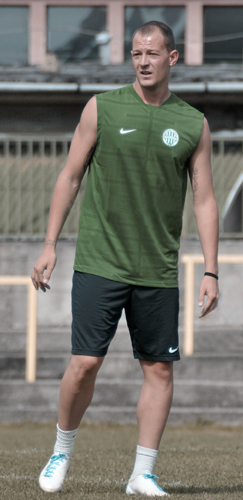

Personal information
- Full name: László Fitos
- Date of birth: 27 February 1987 (age 39)
- Place of birth: Budapest, Hungary
- Height: 1.83 m (6 ft 0 in)
- Position: Midfielder

Team information
- Current team: Kozármisleny
- Number: 88

Youth career
- 1995–2001: Honvéd
- 2001–2005: Ferencváros

Senior career*
Years	Team	Apps	(Gls)
2005–2012	Ferencváros	84	(6)
2010–2012	→ Ferencváros II	8	(0)
2011	→ Szolnok (loan)	14	(1)
2012–2014	Gyirmót	29	(0)
2014–	Kozármisleny	14	(2)

International career
2003–2004	Hungary U-17	?	(?)
2005–2006	Hungary U-19	?	(?)
- * Club domestic league appearances and goals as of 1 June 2014

László Fitos (born 27 February 1987 in Budapest) is a Hungarian football player who plays for Gyirmót SE.
