= Viktor Bölcsföldi =

Hungarian footballer

Personal information
- Full name: Viktor Bölcsföldi
- Date of birth: 10 April 1988 (age 38)
- Place of birth: Székesfehérvár, Hungary
- Height: 1.82 m (5 ft 11 1/2 in)
- Position: Midfielder

Team information
- Current team: Ferencvárosi TC
- Number: 17

Senior career*
| Years | Team | Apps | (Gls) |
| 2005–2006 | Ferencvárosi TC | 0 | (0) |
| 2006–2009 | FC Fehérvár | 4 | (0) |
| 2008 | → FC Felcsút (loan) | 12 | (4) |
| 2009 | CF Liberty Salonta | 12 | (2) |
| 2010– | Ferencvárosi TC | 0 | (0) |
| 2012 | → Szigetszentmiklósi TK (loan) | 4 | (2) |
- * Club domestic league appearances and goals as of 28 June 2012

Viktor Bölcsföldi (born 10 April 1988) is a Hungarian football player who currently plays for Ferencvárosi TC. He was born in Székesfehérvár.
