= Héctor Morales (footballer, born 1989) =

Argentinian footballer

Personal information
- Full name: Héctor Gabriel Morales
- Date of birth: 30 November 1989 (age 36)
- Place of birth: Corrientes, Argentina
- Height: 1.76 m (5 ft 9 1/2 in)
- Positions: Defensive midfielder; forward

Team information
- Current team: Villa San Carlos

Senior career*
Years	Team	Apps	(Gls)
2008–2010	Estudiantes II		
2010–2012	Ferencvárosi TC II	18	(3)
2010–2012	Ferencvárosi TC	21	(2)
2012–2013	Boca Unidos	2	(0)
2013–2014	Ferroviario Corrientes		
2014	CD Victoria	16	(0)
2014–	Villa San Carlos	30	(2)
- * Club domestic league appearances and goals as of 4 May 2015

Héctor Gabriel Morales (born 30 November 1989, in Argentina) is an Argentine football player who currently plays for Villa San Carlos of the Primera B Metropolitana in the Argentine football league system as an attacking midfielder.
