= Srđan Stanić (footballer, born 1982) =

Serbian footballer

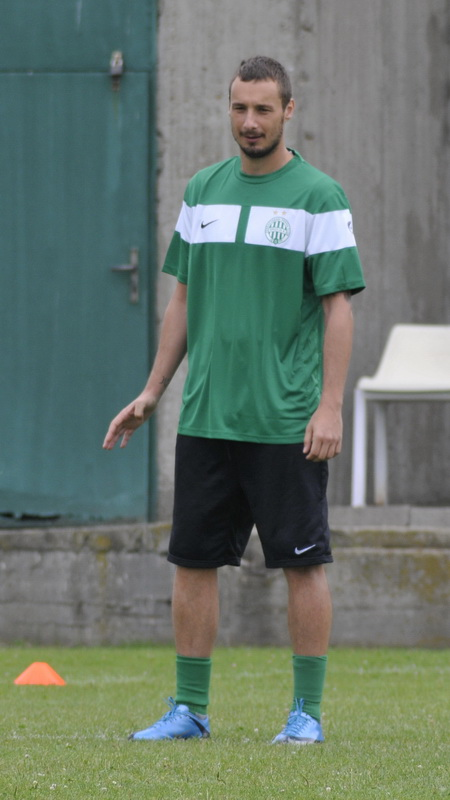
- Stanić with Ferencváros in 2010

Personal information
- Full name: Srđan Stanić
- Date of birth: 7 June 1982 (age 44)
- Place of birth: Titov Vrbas, SFR Yugoslavia
- Height: 1.83 m (6 ft 0 in)
- Position: Midfielder

Youth career
- Vrbas

Senior career*
Years	Team	Apps	(Gls)
2000–2001	Vrbas	31	(4)
2001–2003	OFK Beograd	57	(4)
2003–2004	Spartak Moscow	11	(1)
2005–2008	Hajduk Kula	71	(4)
2008–2009	Diósgyőr	24	(1)
2009–2010	Kaposvár	25	(2)
2010–2011	Ferencváros	22	(1)
2012	Borac Čačak	18	(0)
2013	Sloga Kraljevo	13	(0)
2014–2017	Vrbas	75	(15)
Total		347	(32)

International career
2001–2003	Serbia and Montenegro U21 (Note: Only official UEFA matches included)	3	(0)
- * Club domestic league appearances and goals

Srđan Stanić (Serbian Cyrillic: Срђан Станић; born 7 June 1982) is a Serbian former professional footballer who played as a midfielder.

== Club career ==
Stanić made his senior debut for Vrbas in the last round of the 1999–2000 season. He spent one more year at the club, before transferring to OFK Beograd in the summer of 2001. Two years later, Stanić was sold to Russian club Spartak Moscow. He, however, failed to make an impact in the Russian capital, eventually returning to his country in 2005.

After spending three seasons at Hajduk Kula, Stanić moved abroad for the second time and joined Hungarian club Diósgyőr in the summer of 2008. He remained in Hungary for the next three years, also playing for Kaposvár (2009–10) and Ferencváros (2010–11).

In the 2012 winter transfer window, Stanić made a return to Serbia and signed with Borac Čačak. He spent the whole year at the club, before switching to Sloga Kraljevo. In early 2014, Stanić joined Vrbas and played there until retiring in 2017.

== International career ==
At international level, Stanić was capped three times for Serbia and Montenegro at under-21 level.
