= Nikola Jakimovski =

Macedonian footballer

Personal information
- Full name: Nikola Jakimovski; Никола Jaкимoвcки
- Date of birth: 26 February 1990 (age 36)
- Place of birth: Kriva Palanka, SR Macedonia, SFR Yugoslavia
- Height: 1.87 m (6 ft 1 1/2 in)
- Position: Left back

Senior career*
Years	Team	Apps	(Gls)
2009–2010	Makedonija	4	(1)
2010–2011	Ferencváros	1	(0)
2011	→ Teteks (loan)	8	(3)
2011–2012	Javor Ivanjica	31	(2)
2013	Nagoya Grampus	22	(1)
2014	Jagodina	13	(0)
2015	Varese	10	(1)
2015	Como	14	(0)
2016	Bari	5	(0)
2016–2017	Benevento	10	(1)
2017–2018	Vicenza	12	(0)
2018	Bisceglie	17	(0)
2019	AEL	16	(1)
2019–2020	Trapani	9	(0)
2021	Monopoli	1	(0)
2021	AEL	11	(0)
2022	Apollon Smyrnis	9	(0)

International career
2009–2010	Macedonia U-17	12	(3)
2010–2011	Macedonia U-19	9	(4)
2011–2012	Macedonia U-21	3	(0)
- * Club domestic league appearances and goals as of 21:30, 23 February 2022 (UTC)

Nikola Jakimovski (Macedonian: Никола Jaкимoвcки, born 26 February 1990) is a Macedonian footballer who plays as a left back. He had previously played for Italian Serie B and C clubs such as Varese, Como, Bari, Vicenza, and Bisceglie.

== Club career ==
Born in Skopje (hometown Kriva Palanka), Jakimovski is a product of FK Makedonija Gjorče Petrov youth system. He joined their first team in the 2008–09 season, competing in the Macedonian First League. In 2010, he signed with Hungarian Ferencvárosi TC but after not having many chances he ended up loaned in the second half of the 2010–11 season to Macedonian top league FK Teteks. On 24 August 2011 he signed a contract with Serbian club FK Javor Ivanjica.

=== Ferencvárosi TC ===
Jakimovski only played one match on Ferencváros' side. He came in as a late substitute in a game against Győri ETO, that Ferencvárosi TC won by 3:0 .

=== Nagoya Grampus ===
On 12 December 2012 Nikola Jakimovski signed a contract with Japanese club Nagoya Grampus. He made his debut on in Nagoya Grampus' one all draw against Júbilo Iwata on 2 March 2013.

=== Jagodina ===
At the end of 2013 he returned to Europe, after a year with Nagoya Grampus, Jakimovski moved to Serbian SuperLiga side FK Jagodina on loan.

=== Italian Serie B ===
In January 2015 he signed a 6-months contract with Italian Serie B side Varese and got the shirt number 32. Following the team bankruptcy in summer 2015 he remain unattached till 3 September 2015, when he was free to sign with Como, becoming first Macedonian player to play for the team.

== International career ==
Nikola Jakimovski is eligible to represent North Macedonia and Bulgaria at international level. He represent Macedonia at under-17 and under-19 levels, and has been part of the Macedonian U-21 team from 2011 to 2012.

On 1 October 2015 Bulgaria manager Ivaylo Petev prepare a call up for Jakimovski.

== Club statistics ==
As of 14 August 2014

Club statistics
Season	Club	League	League		Cup		League Cup		Other		Total	
Season	Club	League	App	Goals	App	Goals	App	Goals	App	Goals	App	Goals
Macedonia			League		Macedonian Cup		League Cup		Europe		Total	
2009–10	Makedonija Gjorče Petrov	Prva Liga	4	1	0	0	-		-		4	1
Hungary			League		Hungarian Cup		League Cup		Europe		Total	
2010–11	Ferencvárosi	Nemzeti Bajnokság I	1	0	2	0	-		-		1	0
Macedonia			League		Macedonian Cup		League Cup		Europe		Total	
2010–11	Teteks (Loan)	Prva Liga	8	3	0	0	-		-		8	3
Serbia			League		Serbian Cup		League Cup		Europe		Total	
2011–12	Javor Ivanjica	Serbian SuperLiga	15	0	2	0	-		-		17	0
2012–13	Javor Ivanjica	Serbian SuperLiga	12	2	2	0	-		-		14	2
Japan			League		Emperor's Cup		J.League Cup		Asia		Total	
2013	Nagoya Grampus	J1 League	15	0	1	0	6	1	-		22	1
Serbia			League		Serbian Cup		League Cup		Europe		Total	
2013–14	Jagodina	Serbian SuperLiga	10	0	0	0	-		-		10	0
2014–15	Jagodina	Serbian SuperLiga	1	0	0	0	-		2	0	3	0
Total	Macedonia		38	12	0	0	-		-		38	12
Total	Hungary		3	0	2	0	-		-		5	0
Total	Serbia		38	2	4	0	-		2	0	44	2
Total	Japan		18	2	1	0	6	1	0	0	25	3
Total			97	16	7	0	6	1	2	0	111	17
