= Bence Tóth (footballer, born 1989) =

Hungarian footballer

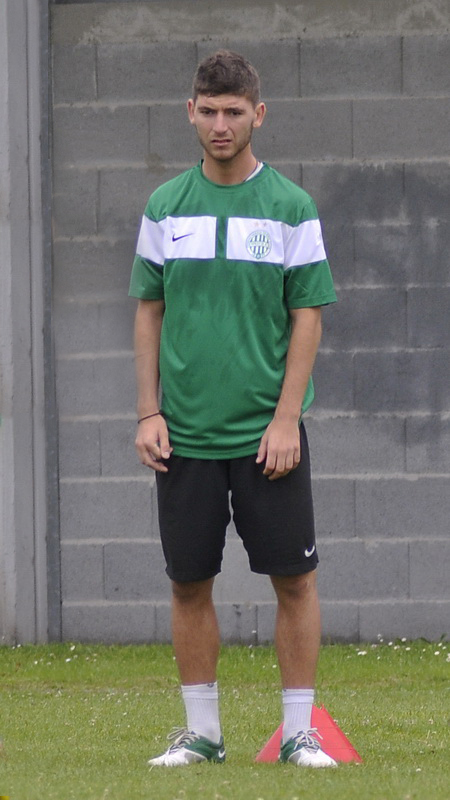

Personal information
- Full name: Bence Tóth
- Date of birth: 22 July 1989 (age 37)
- Place of birth: Szolnok, Hungary
- Height: 1.76 m (5 ft 9 1/2 in)
- Position: Left midfielder

Team information
- Current team: SV Neulengbach

Youth career
- 2002–2005: Szolnok
- 2005–2008: Ferencváros

Senior career*
Years	Team	Apps	(Gls)
2008–2012	Ferencváros	77	(7)
2012–2014	Pápa	27	(1)
2014	Paks	6	(0)
2014–2016	Szolnok	29	(3)
2016–2019	Mezőkövesd	67	(2)
2019–2020	Gyirmót	16	(0)
2021–2022	SC Harland		
2022–	SV Neulengbach		

International career
2008–2009	Hungary U-19		
2009–2010	Hungary U-20	1	(0)
- * Club domestic league appearances and goals as of 21:04, 18 December 2022 (UTC)

Bence Tóth (born 22 July 1989 in Szolnok) is a Hungarian football player who currently plays for SV Neulengbach. He played his first league match in 2008.

Tóth played for Hungary at the 2009 FIFA U-20 World Cup in Egypt.

== Career statistics ==
Appearances and goals by club, season and competition
Club	Season	League			Cup		League Cup		Europe		Total	
Club	Season	Division	Apps	Goals	Apps	Goals	Apps	Goals	Apps	Goals	Apps	Goals
Ferencváros
Ferencváros	2007–08	Nemzeti Bajnokság II	4	0	0	0	0	0	0	0	4	0
Ferencváros	2008–09	Nemzeti Bajnokság II	24	4	1	0	4	2	0	0	29	6
Ferencváros	2009–10	Nemzeti Bajnokság I	15	2	0	0	10	3	0	0	25	5
Ferencváros	2010–11	Nemzeti Bajnokság I	20	0	4	1	1	1	0	0	25	2
Ferencváros	2011–12	Nemzeti Bajnokság II	14	1	1	0	1	0	0	0	16	1
Ferencváros	Total		77	7	6	1	16	6	0	0	99	14
Pápa
Pápa	2011–12	Nemzeti Bajnokság I	2	0	0	0	2	0	0	0	4	0
Pápa	2012–13	Nemzeti Bajnokság I	20	1	2	0	5	0	0	0	27	1
Pápa	2013–14	Nemzeti Bajnokság I	5	0	0	0	1	0	0	0	6	0
Pápa	Total		27	1	2	0	8	0	0	0	37	1
Paks	2013–14	Nemzeti Bajnokság I	6	0	0	0	1	0	0	0	7	0
Szolnok
Szolnok	2014–15	Nemzeti Bajnokság II	15	1	5	0	1	0	—		21	1
Szolnok	2015–16	Nemzeti Bajnokság II	14	2	2	1	—		—		16	3
Szolnok	Total		29	3	7	1	1	0	0	0	37	4
Mezőkövesd
Mezőkövesd	2015–16	Nemzeti Bajnokság II	13	1	0	0	—		—		13	1
Mezőkövesd	2016–17	Nemzeti Bajnokság I	20	0	8	3	—		—		28	3
Mezőkövesd	2017–18	Nemzeti Bajnokság I	23	1	2	0	—		—		25	1
Mezőkövesd	2018–19	Nemzeti Bajnokság I	10	0	5	0	—		—		15	0
Mezőkövesd	Total		66	2	15	3	0	0	0	0	81	5
Career total			205	13	30	5	26	6	0	0	261	24

Updated to games played as of 19 May 2019.

== Honours ==
- FIFA U-20 World Cup:
  - Third place: 2009
