= Máté Vass =

Hungarian footballer

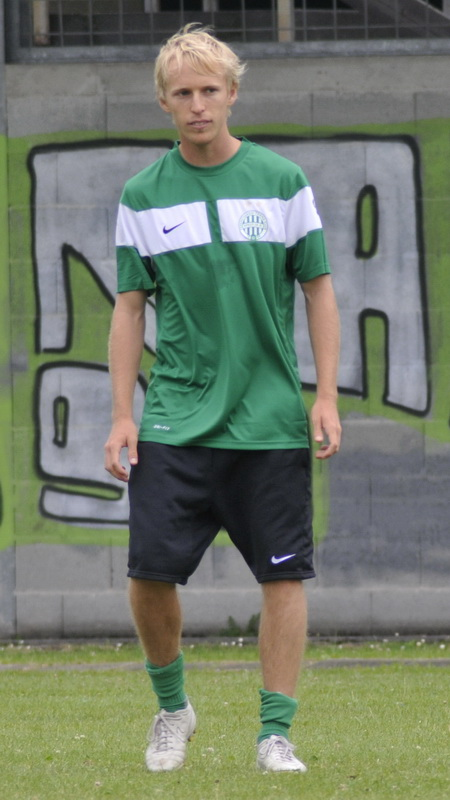

Personal information
- Full name: Máté Vass
- Date of birth: 17 October 1990 (age 36)
- Place of birth: Kápolnásnyék, Hungary
- Height: 1.82 m (6 ft 0 in)
- Position: Midfielder

Team information
- Current team: Szabadkikötő

Youth career
- 2001–2008: Ferencváros

Senior career*
Years	Team	Apps	(Gls)
2008–2013	Ferencváros	2	(0)
2009–2013	Ferencváros II	95	(3)
2013–2015	Siófok	15	(0)
2015–2016	Rákosmente	15	(0)
2016–2017	SZTK	27	(0)
2017–2020	Budafoki MTE	55	(1)
2020–	Szabadkikötő	2	(0)
- * Club domestic league appearances and goals as of 14:10, 19 October 2020 (UTC)

Máté Vass (born 17 October 1990) is a Hungarian football player who currently plays for THSE Szabadkikötő.
