= Đorđe Tutorić =

Serbian footballer

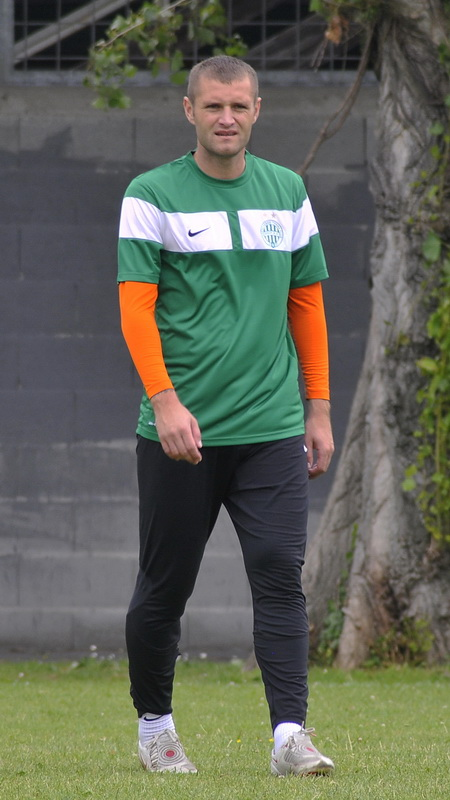
- Tutorić with Ferencváros in 2010

Personal information
- Date of birth: 5 March 1983 (age 43)
- Place of birth: Subotica, SFR Yugoslavia
- Height: 1.87 m (6 ft 2 in)
- Position: Defender

Team information
- Current team: Spartak Subotica (manager)

Senior career*
| Years | Team | Apps | (Gls) |
| 2002–2008 | Red Star Belgrade | 42 | (0) |
| 2002–2005 | → Jedinstvo Ub (loan) | 84 | (6) |
| 2005–2006 | → Mladost Apatin (loan) | 23 | (1) |
| 2008–2009 | Kocaelispor | 8 | (1) |
| 2009–2010 | Red Star Belgrade | 17 | (2) |
| 2010–2011 | Ferencváros | 30 | (1) |
| 2011–2012 | Novi Pazar | 14 | (0) |
| 2012–2013 | Atyrau | 31 | (0) |
| 2014–2015 | AE Ermionida | 25 | (0) |

International career
| 2007 | Serbia | 1 | (0) |

Managerial career
- 2025-: Spartak Subotica
- * Club domestic league appearances and goals

Đorđe Tutorić (Serbian Cyrillic: Ђорђе Туторић; born 5 March 1983) is a Serbian retired footballer.

== Club career ==
Born in Subotica, Tutorić began his career in his native Serbia playing for Red Star Belgrade. From 2002 to 2005, he was loaned to FK Jedinstvo Ub and in the 2005–06 season to FK Mladost Apatin. In late 2008, Tutorić moved to Kocaelispor in the Turkish Süper Lig. In 2009, he returned to Red Star Belgrade and played one season before he moved to Ferencváros TC playing in the Hungarian professional league. In 2012, he joined FK Novi Pazar in the Serbian SuperLiga.

== International career ==
Tutorić made his debut for the full Serbia national football team in a Euro 2008 Group A qualifier at home against Kazakhstan on 24 November 2007.

== Managerial career ==
In October 2025, Tutorić was named manager of hometown club Spartak Subotica.
