= Emil Miljković =

Bosnian-Herzegovinian footballer (born 1988)

Personal information
- Full name: Emil Miljković
- Date of birth: May 26, 1988 (age 38)
- Place of birth: Velika Kladuša, SFR Yugoslavia
- Height: 1.78 m (5 ft 10 in)
- Position: Striker

Youth career
- 1996–2006: Roda JC
- 2006–2007: Alemannia Aachen

Senior career*
Years	Team	Apps	(Gls)
2007–2008	Alemannia Aachen II	28	(9)
2008–2009	Fortuna Sittard	6	(0)
2009–2010	Nafta Lendava	33	(7)
2010–2011	Ferencváros	16	(1)
2011	Ferencváros II	1	(0)
2011-2012	Karlovac	3	(0)
2012–2013	SV Rott		
2013–2014	Groene Ster		
2015	De Kempen		
2015–2016	EVV	4	(1)
2017-2019	SV Eikenderveld		

International career
2008–2010	Bosnia and Herzegovina U-21	6	(0)
- * Club domestic league appearances and goals as of 7 August 2015 (UTC)

Emil Miljković (born 26 May 1988) is a Bosnian-Herzegovinian professional footballer who played as a forward for EVV in the Dutch Topklasse.

== Club career ==
Miljković left Bosnia with his parents when he was 7 years old and joined Roda JC Kerkrade's youth academy, where he spent 10 years. He then moved to Alemannia Aachen and played in Slovenia, Hungary and Croatia.

In January 2015, he left Dutch Hoofdklasse side Groene Ster for Belgian amateur club KFC De Kempen.

== International career ==
Miljković was part of the Bosnia and Herzegovina U-21.
