= 2011–12 Kaposvári Rákóczi FC season =

Kaposvári Rákóczi FC
2011–12 season
- Chairman: (Hungary) Kálmán Torma
- Manager: (Hungary) Tibor Sisa
- NB 1: 10.
- Hungarian Cup: Quarter-final
- Hungarian League Cup: Quarter-final
- Top goalscorer: League: (Serbia) Milan Perić (11); All: (Serbia) Milan Perić (12)
- Highest home attendance: 4,500 v FTC (17 July 2011); 4,500 v Győri ETO FC (10 September 2011)
- Lowest home attendance: 200 v Pápa (22 February 2012)
Home colours	Away colours

The 2011–12 season will be Kaposvári Rákóczi FC's 13th competitive season, 8th consecutive season in the OTP Bank Liga and 88th year in existence as a football club.

== First team squad ==
Note: Flags indicate national team as defined under FIFA eligibility rules; some limited exceptions apply. Players may hold more than one non-FIFA nationality.

No.	Pos.	Nation	Player
3	MF	HUN	Olivér Fenyvesi
4	MF	HUN	Lukács Bőle
5	DF	HUN	István Bank
7	MF	BIH	Boris Gujić
8	MF	CRO	Nikola Šafarić
9	FW	SRB	Miroslav Grumić
10	MF	HUN	Tamás Horváth
11	FW	SEN	Bara Bebeto (loan from FC Lugano)
13	DF	SWE	Dražen Okuka
14	MF	GHA	Aaron Dankwah (loan from FC Lugano)
15	MF	HUN	Olivér Kovács
16	FW	GUI	Moustapha Diallo
17	MF	SVK	Tomáš Sedlák

No.	Pos.	Nation	Player
18	MF	HUN	Benjamin Balázs
19	MF	HUN	György Katona
21	GK	SVK	Ľuboš Hajdúch
22	MF	SRB	Bojan Pavlović
23	GK	HUN	László Horváth
24	MF	HUN	Dávid Hegedűs
25	MF	HUN	Péter Farkas
27	FW	GAM	Jammeh Haruna
28	DF	HUN	Gábor Jánvári
29	DF	HUN	Károly Graszl
30	GK	HUN	Zsolt Posza
31	DF	HUN	József Zsók
33	MF	BRA	Pedro

== Transfers ==
=== Summer ===
In: Note: Flags indicate national team as defined under FIFA eligibility rules; some limited exceptions apply. Players may hold more than one non-FIFA nationality.

No.	Pos.	Nation	Player
8	MF	CRO	Nikola Šafarić (from (Croatia) NK Varaždin)
14	FW	MDA	Serghei Alexeev (from (Ukraine) FC Zakarpattia Uzhhorod)
17	DF	SRB	Petar Mudreša (from (Serbia) FK Hajduk Kula)
19	MF	HUN	György Katona (from Nagyecsed RSE)
21	GK	SVK	Ľuboš Hajdúch (from (Poland) LKS Nieciecza)
25	MF	HUN	Péter Farkas (from Dunakanyar-Vác FC)
27	DF	HUN	Viktor Petrók (loan return from Kozármisleny SE)
28	DF	HUN	Gábor Jánvári (from Tiszakanyár SE)
29	DF	HUN	Károly Graszl (from BFC Siófok)
30	GK	HUN	Zsolt Posza (from Balatonelle SE)
––	MF	HUN	Olivér Fenyvesi (from Vasas SC)

Out: Note: Flags indicate national team as defined under FIFA eligibility rules; some limited exceptions apply. Players may hold more than one non-FIFA nationality.

No.	Pos.	Nation	Player
1	GK	HUN	Árpád Milinte (to BFC Siófok)
6	DF	HUN	Norbert Kardos (loan return to Debreceni VSC)
10	FW	HUN	Róbert Szepessy (to Szolnoki MÁV FC)
12	GK	HUN	József Strublics (loan return to Kaposvölgye VSC)
14	FW	SRB	Lóránt Oláh (loan to Ferencvárosi TC)
16	MF	HUN	Péter Máté (to Zalaegerszegi TE)
19	MF	POR	André Cabete Portulez (unattached)
20	MF	HUN	Zoltán Farkas (to Vasas SC)
26	DF	HUN	Tamás Grúz (to Ferencvárosi TC)
28	DF	HUN	Krisztián Zahorecz (to Bajai LSE)
29	GK	HUN	Zoltán Farkas (to (Cyprus) Aris Limassol F.C.)
30	DF	HUN	Mihály Korhut (loan return to Debreceni VSC)

=== Winter ===
In: Note: Flags indicate national team as defined under FIFA eligibility rules; some limited exceptions apply. Players may hold more than one non-FIFA nationality.

No.	Pos.	Nation	Player
2	DF	HUN	Ádám Major (from Kaposvári Rákóczi FC II)
10	DF	HUN	Tamás Horváth (from Kaposvári Rákóczi FC II)
11	FW	SEN	Bara Bebeto (on loan from (Switzerland) FC Lugano)
14	MF	GHA	Aaron Dankwah (on loan from (Switzerland) FC Lugano)
16	FW	GUI	Moustapha Diallo (from Kaposvári Rákóczi FC II)
17	MF	SVK	Tomáš Sedlák (from (Slovakia) MFK Ružomberok)
27	FW	GAM	Jammeh Haruna (from Kaposvári Rákóczi FC II)
32	MF	HUN	Olivér Fenyvesi (from Kaposvári Rákóczi FC II)

Out: Note: Flags indicate national team as defined under FIFA eligibility rules; some limited exceptions apply. Players may hold more than one non-FIFA nationality.

No.	Pos.	Nation	Player
3	FW	SRB	Milan Perić (to Videoton FC)
10	MF	HUN	Kornél Kulcsár (to Szombathelyi Haladás)
11	MF	MAR	Daniane Jawad
14	FW	MDA	Serghei Alexeev (on loan to (Israel) Maccabi Netanya F.C.)
16	FW	HUN	Gábor Reszli (to Nagyatádi FC)
17	DF	SRB	Petar Mudreša
26	MF	HUN	Norbert Kardos (loan return to Debreceni VSC)
—	MF	HUN	Valentin Berdó (to Bajai LSE)
—	MF	HUN	Bence Házi (on loan to BKV Előre SC)
—	DF	HUN	Zalán Vadas (on loan to BKV Előre SC)

- List of Hungarian football transfer summer 2011
- List of Hungarian football transfers winter 2011–12

== Statistics ==
=== Appearances and goals ===
Last updated on 27 May 2012.

No.	Pos	Nat	Player	Total		OTP Bank Liga		Hungarian Cup		League Cup	
No.	Pos	Nat	Player	Apps	Goals	Apps	Goals	Apps	Goals	Apps	Goals
3	MF	(Hungary) HUN	Olivér Fenyvesi	2	0	1	0	0	0	1	0
4	MF	(Hungary) HUN	Lukács Bőle	15	1	9	1	0	0	6	0
5	DF	(Hungary) HUN	István Bank	32	1	25	1	3	0	4	0
7	MF	(Bosnia and Herzegovina) BIH	Boris Gujić	32	1	22	0	4	1	6	0
8	MF	(Croatia) CRO	Nikola Šafarić	19	1	14	1	2	0	3	0
9	FW	(Serbia) SRB	Miroslav Grumić	29	10	19	7	4	1	6	2
10	MF	(Hungary) HUN	Tamás Horváth	14	0	12	0	1	0	1	0
11	FW	(Senegal) SEN	Bara Bebeto	13	5	9	5	2	0	2	0
13	DF	(Sweden) SWE	Dražen Okuka	30	1	25	1	2	0	3	0
14	MF	(Ghana) GHA	Aaron Dankwah	15	0	12	0	1	0	2	0
15	MF	(Hungary) HUN	Olivér Kovács	14	1	4	0	4	0	6	1
16	FW	(Guinea) GUI	Moustapha Diallo	22	0	14	0	1	0	7	0
17	MF	(Slovakia) SVK	Tomáš Sedlák	7	0	4	0	1	0	2	0
18	MF	(Hungary) HUN	Benjamin Balázs	33	3	27	3	5	0	1	0
19	MF	(Hungary) HUN	György Katona	11	1	2	0	5	1	4	0
21	GK	(Slovakia) SVK	Ľuboš Hajdúch	29	-37	27	-36	2	-1	0	0
22	MF	(Serbia) SRB	Bojan Pavlović	27	2	17	1	4	0	6	1
23	GK	(Hungary) HUN	László Horváth	4	-4	2	-1	0	0	2	-3
24	MF	(Hungary) HUN	Dávid Hegedűs	31	0	25	0	3	0	3	0
25	MF	(Hungary) HUN	Péter Farkas	16	0	4	0	6	0	6	0
27	FW	(The Gambia) GAM	Jammeh Haruna	27	5	18	2	2	0	7	3
28	DF	(Hungary) HUN	Gábor Jánvári	33	0	22	0	5	0	6	0
29	DF	(Hungary) HUN	Károly Graszl	28	3	19	2	3	0	6	1
30	GK	(Hungary) HUN	Zsolt Posza	12	-8	2	-3	4	-1	6	-4
31	DF	(Hungary) HUN	József Zsók	24	1	19	0	3	1	2	0
33	MF	(Brazil) BRA	Pedro	20	0	17	0	0	0	3	0
Youth players
2	DF	(Hungary) HUN	Ádám Major	2	0	0	0	1	0	1	0
20	MF	(Hungary) HUN	Zoltán Farkas	1	2	0	0	0	0	1	2
	FW	(Hungary) HUN	Dávid Wittrédi	1	0	0	0	0	0	1	0
Players currently out on loan
14	FW	(Moldova) MDA	Serghei Alexeev	16	0	11	0	3	0	2	0
26	DF	(Hungary) HUN	Zalán Vadas	2	0	0	0	0	0	2	0
Players no longer at the club
3	FW	(Serbia) SRB	Milan Perić	21	13	15	11	4	2	2	0
6	MF	(Hungary) HUN	Norbert Kardos	5	0	0	0	2	0	3	0
10	MF	(Hungary) HUN	Kornél Kulcsár	19	0	13	0	2	0	4	0
11	MF	(Morocco) MAR	Daniane Jawad	14	0	6	0	3	0	5	0
17	DF	(Serbia) SRB	Petar Mudreša	8	0	3	0	2	0	3	0

=== Top scorers ===
Includes all competitive matches. The list is sorted by shirt number when total goals are equal.

Last updated on 27 May 2012

Position	Nation	Number	Name	OTP Bank Liga	Hungarian Cup	League Cup	Total
1	(Serbia)	3	Milan Perić	11	2	0	13
2	(Serbia)	9	Miroslav Grumić	7	1	2	10
3	(Senegal)	11	Bara Bebeto	5	0	0	5
4	(The Gambia)	27	Jammeh Haruna	2	0	3	5
5	(Hungary)	18	Benjamin Balázs	3	0	0	3
6	(Hungary)	29	Károly Graszl	2	0	1	3
7	(Serbia)	22	Bojan Pavlović	1	0	1	2
8	(Hungary)	20	Zoltán Farkas	0	0	2	2
9	(Sweden) (Serbia)	13	Dražen Okuka	1	0	0	1
10	(Hungary)	5	István Bank	1	0	0	1
11	(Croatia)	8	Nikola Šafarić	1	0	0	1
12	(Hungary)	4	Lukács Bőle	1	0	0	1
13	(Hungary)	19	György Katona	0	1	0	1
14	(Hungary)	31	József Zsók	0	1	0	1
15	(Bosnia and Herzegovina)	7	Boris Gujić	0	1	0	1
16	(Hungary)	15	Olivér Kovács	0	0	1	1
/	/	/	Own Goals	0	1	0	0
			TOTALS	35	6	10	50

=== Disciplinary record ===
Includes all competitive matches. Players with 1 card or more included only.

Last updated on 27 May 2012

Position	Nation	Number	Name	OTP Bank Liga		Hungarian Cup		League Cup		Total (Hu Total)	
Position	Nation	Number	Name	Yellow card	Red card	Yellow card	Red card	Yellow card	Red card	Yellow card	Red card
FW	(Serbia)	3	Milan Perić	2	1	0	0	0	0	2 (2)	1 (1)
MF	(Hungary)	4	Lukács Bőle	1	0	0	0	1	0	2 (1)	0 (0)
DF	(Hungary)	5	István Bank	1	0	0	0	0	0	1 (1)	0 (0)
MF	(Hungary)	6	Norbert Kardos	0	0	2	0	1	0	3 (0)	0 (0)
MF	(Bosnia and Herzegovina)	7	Boris Gujić	4	0	0	0	0	0	4 (4)	0 (0)
MF	(Croatia)	8	Nikola Šafarić	0	0	1	0	0	0	1 (0)	0 (0)
MF	(Serbia)	9	Miroslav Grumić	6	0	2	0	0	0	8 (6)	0 (0)
MF	(Hungary)	10	Kornél Kulcsár	2	0	1	0	0	0	3 (2)	0 (0)
FW	(Senegal)	11	Bara Bebeto	3	0	0	0	0	0	3 (3)	0 (0)
MF	(Morocco)	11	Daniane Jawad	1	0	0	0	0	0	1 (1)	0 (0)
DF	(Sweden) (Serbia)	13	Dražen Okuka	7	1	0	0	0	0	7 (7)	1 (1)
MF	(Ghana)	14	Aaron Dankwah	2	0	0	0	0	0	2 (2)	0 (0)
FW	(Moldova)	14	Serghei Alexeev	2	0	1	0	0	0	3 (2)	0 (0)
MF	(Hungary)	15	Olivér Kovács	0	0	0	1	0	0	0 (0)	1 (0)
FW	(Guinea)	16	Moustapha Diallo	4	0	0	0	2	1	6 (4)	1 (0)
MF	(Slovakia)	17	Tomáš Sedlák	1	0	0	0	0	0	1 (1)	0 (0)
DF	(Serbia)	17	Petar Mudreša	1	0	1	0	0	0	2 (1)	0 (0)
MF	(Hungary)	18	Benjamin Balázs	8	0	0	0	0	0	8 (8)	0 (0)
MF	(Hungary)	19	György Katona	0	0	0	0	2	0	2 (0)	0 (0)
GK	(Slovakia)	21	Ľuboš Hajdúch	2	0	0	0	0	0	2 (2)	0 (0)
MF	(Serbia)	22	Bojan Pavlović	2	0	0	0	0	0	2 (2)	0 (0)
MF	(Hungary)	25	Péter Farkas	1	0	1	0	1	0	3 (1)	0 (0)
FW	(The Gambia)	27	Jammeh Haruna	4	0	0	1	2	0	6 (4)	1 (0)
DF	(Hungary)	28	Gábor Jánvári	7	1	0	0	2	0	9 (7)	1 (1)
DF	(Hungary)	29	Károly Graszl	2	1	0	1	1	0	3 (2)	2 (1)
DF	(Hungary)	31	József Zsók	3	1	0	0	1	0	4 (3)	1 (1)
MF	(Brazil)	33	Pedro	3	0	0	0	0	0	3 (3)	0 (0)
			TOTALS	69	5	9	3	13	1	91 (69)	9 (5)

=== Overall ===
Games played	44 (30 OTP Bank Liga, 6 Hungarian Cup and 8 Hungarian League Cup)
Games won	14 (7 OTP Bank Liga, 3 Hungarian Cup and 4 Hungarian League Cup)
Games drawn	18 (14 OTP Bank Liga, 2 Hungarian Cup and 2 Hungarian League Cup)
Games lost	12 (9 OTP Bank Liga, 1 Hungarian Cup and 2 Hungarian League Cup)
Goals scored	52
Goals conceded	51
Goal difference	+1
Yellow cards	91
Red cards	9
Worst discipline	(Hungary) Gábor Jánvári (9 (yellow card) , 1 (red card) )
Best result	3–0 (H) v Putnoki VSE - Hungarian Cup - 03-12-2011
Worst result	0–4 (A) v Kecskeméti TE - OTP Bank Liga - 24-07-2011
Most appearances	(Hungary) Gábor Jánvári (33 appearances)
Most appearances	(Hungary) Benjamin Balázs (33 appearances)
Top scorer	(Serbia) Milan Perić (13 goal)
Points	60/132 (45.46%)

Last updated: 27 May 2012

== Nemzeti Bajnokság I ==
=== Matches ===
17 July 2011 1	Kaposvári Rákóczi FC	2–2	Ferencvárosi TC	Kaposvár, Somogy County
18:00 CET (UTC+01)	Okuka 5'; Perić 73'	(Report)	Felix 26'; Otten 83'	Stadium: Stadion Kaposvár Rákóczi; Attendance: 4,500; Referee: (Hungary) Viktor Kassai

24 July 2011 2	Kecskeméti TE	4–0	Kaposvári Rákóczi FC	Kecskemét, Bács-Kiskun County
19:00 CET (UTC+01)	Foxi 10' 13'; Savić 31' (pen.); Gyurcsó 53'	(Report)		Stadium: Széktói Stadion; Attendance: 2,700; Referee: (Hungary) Roland Veizer

30 July 2011 3	Kaposvári Rákóczi FC	2–0	Videoton FC	Kaposvár, Somogy County
20:00 CET (UTC+01)	Perić 13' 68'	(Report)		Stadium: Stadion Kaposvár Rákóczi; Attendance: 3,000; Referee: (Hungary) Ádám Németh

6 August 2011 4	Lombard-Pápa TFC	1–0	Kaposvári Rákóczi FC	Pápa, Veszprém County
19:00 CET (UTC+01)	Lovrencsics 42'	(Report)		Stadium: Stadion Várkerti; Attendance: 2,000; Referee: (Hungary) Ádám Radványi

14 August 2011 5	Kaposvári Rákóczi FC	2–2	Újpest FC	Kaposvár, Somogy County
18:00 CET (UTC+01)	Perić 7' 85'	(Report)	Dvorschák 47'; Rajczi 88'	Stadium: Stadion Kaposvár Rákóczi; Attendance: 3,500; Referee: (Hungary) József Berger

20 August 2011 6	BFC Siófok	3–1	Kaposvári Rákóczi FC	Siófok, Somogy County
19:00 CET (UTC+01)	Melczer 25' (pen.) 28' (pen.) 65' (pen.)	(Report)	Bank 16'	Stadium: Révész Street Stadium; Attendance: 3,000; Referee: (Hungary) János Takács

27 August 2011 7	Kaposvári Rákóczi FC	4–4	Paksi SE	Kaposvár, Somogy County
19:00 CET (UTC+01)	Perić 30' 32'; Balázs 71'; Šafarić 87' (pen.)	(Report)	Kiss 56'; Bartha 69'; Böde 89'; Gévay 90+1'	Stadium: Stadion Kaposvár Rákóczi; Attendance: 4,000; Referee: (Hungary) Balázs Berke

10 September 2011 8	Kaposvári Rákóczi FC	0–0	Győri ETO FC	Kaposvár, Somogy County
19:00 CET (UTC+01)		(Report)		Stadium: Stadion Kaposvár Rákóczi; Attendance: 4,500; Referee: (Hungary) Ádám Németh

16 September 2011 9	Diósgyőri VTK	2–1	Kaposvári Rákóczi FC	Miskolc, Borsod-Abaúj-Zemplén County
18:00 CET (UTC+01)	Lippai 11'; Arze 52'	(Report)	Perić 66'	Stadium: DVTK Stadion; Attendance: 5,000; Referee: (Hungary) Gábor Oláh

24 September 2011 10	Kaposvári Rákóczi FC	1–1	Debreceni VSC	Kaposvár, Somogy County
15:00 CET (UTC+01)	Haruna 80'	(Report)	Coulibaly 90+3' (pen.)	Stadium: Stadion Kaposvár Rákóczi; Attendance: 2,800; Referee: (Hungary) Zsolt Szabó

1 October 2011 11	Pécsi Mecsek FC	1–1	Kaposvári Rákóczi FC	Pécs, Baranya County
18:00 CET (UTC+01)	Andorka 24'	(Report)	Perić 23'	Stadium: Stadion PMFC; Attendance: 3,500; Referee: (Hungary) Tamás Bognár

15 October 2011 12	Kaposvári Rákóczi FC	2–2	Budapest Honvéd FC	Kaposvár, Somogy County
18:00 CET (UTC+01)	Perić 45' (pen.); Pavlović 55'	(Report)	Danilo 8' 35'	Stadium: Stadion Kaposvár Rákóczi; Attendance: 3,500; Referee: (Hungary) Péter Solymosi

22 October 2011 13	Szombathelyi Haladás	1–1	Kaposvári Rákóczi FC	Szombathely, Vas County
17:00 CET (UTC+01)	Vujović 45'	(Report)	Perić 83'	Stadium: Rohonci Street Stadium; Attendance: 5,000; Referee: (Hungary) József Berger

29 October 2011 14	Kaposvári Rákóczi FC	0–0	Vasas SC	Kaposvár, Somogy County
17:00 CET (UTC+01)		(Report)		Stadium: Stadion Kaposvár Rákóczi; Attendance: 2,500; Referee: (Hungary) Ádám Farkas

5 November 2011 15	Zalaegerszegi TE	1–1	Kaposvári Rákóczi FC	Zalaegerszeg, Zala County
17:00 CET (UTC+01)	Méyé 30'	(Report)	Bőle 15'	Stadium: ZTE Arena; Attendance: 3,124; Referee: (Hungary) Péter Solymosi

20 November 2011 16	Ferencvárosi TC	0–0	Kaposvári Rákóczi FC	Budapest, Pest County
18:00 CET (UTC+01)		(Report)		Stadium: Stadion Albert Flórián; Attendance: 2,000; Referee: (Hungary) Ádám Németh

26 November 2011 17	Kaposvári Rákóczi FC	2–1	Kecskeméti TE	Kaposvár, Somogy County
16:00 CET (UTC+01)	Balázs 37'; Graszl 63'	(Report)	Lencse 48'	Stadium: Stadion Kaposvár Rákóczi; Attendance: 2,000; Referee: (Hungary) Zsolt Szabó

3 March 2012 18	Videoton FC	2–0	Kaposvári Rákóczi FC	Székesfehérvár, Fejér County
15:00 CET (UTC+01)	Nikolić 69'; Gyurcsó 90'	(Report)		Stadium: Sóstói Stadion; Attendance: 3,423; Referee: (Hungary) József Berger

10 March 2012 19	Kaposvári Rákóczi FC	2–0	Lombard-Pápa TFC	Kaposvár, Somogy County
16:00 CET (UTC+01)	Grumić 6' 73'	(Report)		Stadium: Stadion Kaposvár Rákóczi; Attendance: 2,000; Referee: (Hungary) Ádám Farkas

16 March 2012 20	Újpest FC	3–1	Kaposvári Rákóczi FC	Budapest, Pest County
18:00 CET (UTC+01)	Remili 20'; Kabát 54' 85'	(Report)	Grumić 52'	Stadium: Szusza Ferenc Stadium; Attendance: 2,500; Referee: (Hungary) Dániel Becséri

24 March 2012 21	Kaposvári Rákóczi FC	2–3	BFC Siófok	Kaposvár, Somogy County
17:00 CET (UTC+01)	Bebeto 57'; Haruna 73'	(Report)	Nyári 18'; Haraszti 20'; Simon 36'	Stadium: Stadion Kaposvár Rákóczi; Attendance: 2,500; Referee: (Hungary) Zoltán Iványi

31 March 2012 22	Paksi SE	0–0	Kaposvári Rákóczi FC	Paks, Tolna County
17:00 CET (UTC+01)		(Report)		Stadium: Stadion PSE; Attendance: 1,000; Referee: (Hungary) Péter Solymosi

6 April 2012 23	Győri ETO FC	2–1	Kaposvári Rákóczi FC	Győr, Győr-Moson-Sopron County
18:00 CET (UTC+01)	Pátkai 9'; Varga 25'	(Report)	Bebeto 46'	Stadium: ETO Park; Attendance: 2,500; Referee: (Hungary) Mihály Fábián

13 April 2012 24	Kaposvári Rákóczi FC	3–2	Diósgyőri VTK	Kaposvár, Somogy County
18:00 CET (UTC+01)	Bebeto 60' (pen.) 86'; Grumić 90+3'	(Report)	Sekour 32'; Tisza 71'	Stadium: Stadion Kaposvár Rákóczi; Attendance: 4,000; Referee: (Hungary) Dániel Becséri

22 April 2012 25	Debreceni VSC	3–0	Kaposvári Rákóczi FC	Debrecen, Hajdú-Bihar County
18:30 CET (UTC+01)	Korhut 7'; Méyé 28'; Bouadla 36'	(Report)		Stadium: Stadion Oláh Gábor Út; Attendance: 5,000; Referee: (Hungary) István Vad

28 April 2012 26	Kaposvári Rákóczi FC	1–0	Pécsi Mecsek FC	Kaposvár, Somogy County
18:00 CET (UTC+01)	Balázs 48'	(Report)		Stadium: Stadion Kaposvár Rákóczi; Attendance: 2,500; Referee: (Hungary) Ádám Radványi

6 May 2012 27	Budapest Honvéd FC	0–0	Kaposvári Rákóczi FC	Budapest, Pest County
16:00 CET (UTC+01)		(Report)		Stadium: Bozsik Stadion; Attendance: 500; Referee: (Hungary) Zoltán Iványi

12 May 2012 28	Kaposvári Rákóczi FC	1–1	Szombathelyi Haladás	Kaposvár, Somogy County
18:00 CET (UTC+01)	Grumić 51'	(Report)	Nagy 15'	Stadium: Stadion Kaposvár Rákóczi; Attendance: 2,000; Referee: (Hungary) Balázs Berke

20 May 2012 29	Vasas SC	0–1	Kaposvári Rákóczi FC	Budapest, Pest County
15:00 CET (UTC+01)		(Report)	Bebeto 79' (pen.)	Stadium: Stadion Rudolf Illovszky; Attendance: 800; Referee: (Hungary) József Berger

27 May 2012 30	Kaposvári Rákóczi FC	3–1	Zalaegerszegi TE	Kaposvár, Somogy County
18:00 CET (UTC+01)	Grumić 4' 20'; Graszl 62' (pen.)	(Report)	Okuka 10' (o.g.)	Stadium: Stadion Kaposvár Rákóczi; Attendance: 2,000; Referee: (Hungary) Roland Veizer

=== Classification ===
Pos	Team	Pld	W	D	L	GF	GA	GD	Pts
8	Haladás	30	9	11	10	39	37	+2	38
9	Siófok	30	9	9	12	30	41	−11	36
10	Kaposvár	30	7	14	9	35	42	−7	35
11	Ferencváros	30	9	7	14	32	35	−3	34
12	Pécs	30	8	10	12	36	50	−14	34

Source: MLSZ (in Hungarian)
Rules for classification: 1st points; 2nd overall wins; 3rd goal difference; 4th goals scored

=== Results summary ===
Overall								Home						Away					
Pld	W	D	L	GF	GA	GD	Pts	W	D	L	GF	GA	GD	W	D	L	GF	GA	GD
30	7	14	9	35	42	−7	35	6	8	1	27	19	+8	1	6	8	8	23	−15

Last updated: 27 May 2012.
Source: NB1

=== Results by round ===
Round	1	2	3	4	5	6	7	8	9	10	11	12	13	14	15	16	17	18	19	20	21	22	23	24	25	26	27	28	29	30
Ground	H	A	H	A	H	A	H	H	A	H	A	H	A	H	A	A	H	A	H	A	H	A	A	H	A	H	A	H	A	H
Result	D	L	W	L	D	L	D	D	L	D	D	D	D	D	D	D	W	L	W	L	L	D	L	W	L	W	D	D	W	W
Position	8	12	10	11	11	12	12	12	12	13	13	14	15	15	15	14	13	15	11	13	14	13	13	13	14	13	13	14	13	10

Updated to match(es) played on 27 May 2012. Source: Matches
A = Away; H = Home; W = Win; D = Draw; L = Loss

== Hungarian Cup ==
21 September 2011 3	Andráshida SC	0–2	Kaposvári Rákóczi FC	Andráshida, Zala County
15:30		(Report)	Katona 7'; Varga 17' (o.g.)	Stadium: Városi Sporttelep; Attendance: 250; Referee: (Hungary) Gábor Kovács

26 October 2011 4	Rákosmenti KSK	0–1	Kaposvári Rákóczi FC	Budapest, Pest County
14:00		(Report)	Perić 99'	Stadium: Rákosmenti Sporttelep; Attendance: 200; Referee: (Hungary) László Lovas

=== Round of 16 ===
30 November 2011 1st leg	Putnoki VSE	1–1	Kaposvári Rákóczi FC	Putnok, Borsod-Abaúj-Zemplén County
13:00	Zimányi 70'	(Report)	Grumić 20'	Stadium: Városi Sporttelep; Attendance: 500; Referee: (Hungary) Dániel Becséri

3 December 2011 2nd leg	Kaposvári Rákóczi FC	3–0 (4–1 agg.)	Putnoki VSE	Kaposvár, Somogy County
14:00	Perić 28'; Zsók 41'; Gujić 64'	(Report)		Stadium: Stadion Kaposvár Rákóczi; Attendance: 500; Referee: (Hungary) Szabolcs Szilasi

=== Quarter-final ===
25 February 2012 1st leg	Kaposvári Rákóczi FC	0–1	Debreceni VSC	Kaposvár, Somogy County
14:00		(Report)	Coulibaly 81'	Stadium: Stadion Kaposvár Rákóczi; Attendance: 600; Referee: (Hungary) Ádám Németh

13 March 2012 2nd leg	Debreceni VSC	0–0 (1–0 agg.)	Kaposvári Rákóczi FC	Debrecen, Hajdú-Bihar County
18:00		(Report)		Stadium: Stadion Oláh Gábor Út; Attendance: 2,000; Referee: (Hungary) Szabolcs Szilasi

== League Cup ==
=== Group stage ===
30 August 2011 1	Pécsi Mecsek FC	1–2	Kaposvári Rákóczi FC	Pécs, Baranya County
18:00	Tóth 57' (pen.)	(Report)	Farkas 6' 79'	Stadium: Stadion PMFC; Attendance: 300; Referee: (Hungary) Dániel Becséri

6 September 2011 2	Kaposvári Rákóczi FC	2–0	BFC Siófok	Kaposvár, Somogy County
16:30	Kovács 30'; Graszl 48'	(Report)		Stadium: Stadion Kaposvár Rákóczi; Attendance: 300; Referee: (Hungary) Béla Botló

5 October 2011 3	Ferencvárosi TC	0–2	Kaposvári Rákóczi FC	Budapest, Pest County
18:00		(Report)	Grumić 38' 65'	Stadium: Stadion Albert Flórián; Attendance: 250; Referee: (Hungary) Balázs Berke

12 October 2011 4	Kaposvári Rákóczi FC	2–2	Ferencvárosi TC	Kaposvár, Somogy County
18:00	Pavlović 28' (pen.); Haruna 46'	(Report)	Fitos 42'; Nyilasi 87'	Stadium: Stadion Kaposvár Rákóczi; Attendance: 600; Referee: (Hungary) Balázs Böcskei

8 November 2011 5	BFC Siófok	2–0	Kaposvári Rákóczi FC	Siófok, Somogy County
14:00	Božović 57'; Lattenstein 64'	(Report)		Stadium: Révész Street Stadium; Attendance: 100; Referee: (Hungary) Tibor Gyarmati

15 November 2011 6	Kaposvári Rákóczi FC	1–0	Pécsi Mecsek FC	Kaposvár, Somogy County
16:00	Haruna 69'	(Report)		Stadium: Stadion Kaposvár Rákóczi; Attendance: 300; Referee: (Hungary) József Berger

==== Classification ====
Pos	Team	Pld	W	D	L	GF	GA	GD	Pts	Qualification
1	Kaposvári Rákóczi FC	6	4	1	1	9	5	+4	13	Advance to knockout phase
2	Pécsi Mecsek	6	3	1	2	10	6	+4	10	
3	Siófok	6	3	1	2	7	7	0	10	
4	Ferencvárosi TC	6	0	1	5	6	13	−7	1	

Rules for classification: 1) points; 2) goal difference; 3) number of goals scored.

=== Quarter-final ===
22 February 2012 1st leg	Kaposvári Rákóczi FC	0–1	Lombard-Pápa TFC	Kaposvár, Somogy County
13:30		(Report)	Tóth 75'	Stadium: Stadion Kaposvár Rákóczi; Attendance: 200; Referee: (Hungary) Gábor Oláh

7 March 2012 2nd leg	Lombard-Pápa TFC	1–1 (2–1 agg.)	Kaposvári Rákóczi FC	Pápa, Veszprém County
16:00	Benko 50'	(Report)	Haruna 13'	Stadium: Stadion Várkerti; Attendance: 200; Referee: (Hungary) Ádám Radványi

== Pre Season (Winter) ==
24 January 2012	Paksi SE II	0–1	Kaposvári Rákóczi FC	Madocsa, Tolna County
		(Report)	Bőle 52'	Stadium: Sporttelep Városi; Attendance: 100; Referee: (Hungary) J. Lacza

28 January 2012	(Slovenia) NK Nafta Lendava	0–2	Kaposvári Rákóczi FC	Lendava, Slovenia
		(Report)	Gujić 78'; Haruna 88'	Stadium: Lendava Sports Park; Attendance: 100

31 January 2012	Csákvári TK	1–2	Kaposvári Rákóczi FC	Siófok, Somogy County
	Béres 65'	(Report)	Diallo 34'; Pavlović 40'	Attendance: 100

4 February 2012	Kaposvári Rákóczi FC	3–0	Ceglédi VSE	Telki, Pest County
	Grumić; Okuka; Horváth	(Report)		Referee: (Hungary) Krisztián Pánczél

7 February 2012	(Croatia) NK HAŠK	1–3	Kaposvári Rákóczi FC	Pula, Croatia
		(Report)	Pavlović; Diallo; Zsók

11 February 2012	(Croatia) NK Karlovac	0–0	Kaposvári Rákóczi FC	Pula, Croatia
		(Report)

14 February 2012	(Croatia) NK Opatija	0–0	Kaposvári Rákóczi FC	Opatija, Croatia
		(Report)		Stadium: Igralište Opatije

18 February 2012	Kaposvári Rákóczi FC	4–0	Dombóvári FC	Kaposvár, Somogy County
	Hegedűs; Major; Balázs	(Report)		Stadium: Stadion Kaposvár Rákóczi; Attendance: 200; Referee: (Hungary) Böröczi
