= 2012–13 Kaposvári Rákóczi FC season =

Kaposvári Rákóczi FC
2012–13 season
- Chairman: (Hungary) Kálmán Torma
- Manager: (Hungary) László Prukner
- NB 1: 11.
- Hungarian Cup: 3. round
- Hungarian League Cup: Group Stage
- Top goalscorer: League: Lóránt Oláh (8); All: Lóránt Oláh (9)
- Highest home attendance: 3,000 v Ferencváros (18 November 2012)
- Lowest home attendance: 100 v Zalaegerszeg (13 November 2012)
Home colours	Away colours

The 2012–13 season will be Kaposvári Rákóczi FC's 14th competitive season, 9th consecutive season in the OTP Bank Liga and 89th year in existence as a football club.

== First team squad ==
Note: Flags indicate national team as defined under FIFA eligibility rules; some limited exceptions apply. Players may hold more than one non-FIFA nationality.

No.	Pos.	Nation	Player
3	MF	GHA	Aaron Dankwah (loan from Lugano)
4	MF	HUN	Lukács Bőle
5	DF	HUN	István Bank
7	MF	SRB	Bojan Pavlović
8	MF	CRO	Nikola Šafarić
9	FW	HUN	Róbert Waltner
10	MF	HUN	Tamás Horváth
13	DF	SRB	Dražen Okuka
14	FW	HUN	Lóránt Oláh
15	MF	HUN	Olivér Kovács
16	FW	GUI	Moustapha Diallo

No.	Pos.	Nation	Player
17	FW	CRO	Bojan Vručina
18	MF	HUN	Benjamin Balázs
20	DF	HUN	Bence Zámbó (loan from Győri ETO FC)
21	GK	SVK	Ľuboš Hajdúch
24	MF	HUN	Dávid Hegedűs
25	MF	SEN	Khaly Thiam
27	FW	GAM	Jammeh Haruna
28	DF	HUN	Gábor Jánvári
29	DF	GRE	Lazaros Fotias
33	MF	BRA	Pedro

== Transfers ==
=== Summer ===
In: Note: Flags indicate national team as defined under FIFA eligibility rules; some limited exceptions apply. Players may hold more than one non-FIFA nationality.

No.	Pos.	Nation	Player
9	FW	HUN	Róbert Waltner (from (Austria) Mattersburg)
11	MF	HUN	Bence Házi (loan return from BKV Előre)
14	FW	HUN	Lóránt Oláh (loan return from Ferencváros)
14	FW	MDA	Serghei Alexeev (loan return from (Israel) Maccabi Netanya)
19	FW	CRO	Bojan Vručina (from (Croatia) Slaven Belupo)
20	DF	HUN	Bence Zámbó (loan from Győr)
26	DF	HUN	Zalán Vadas (loan return from BKV Előre)

Out: Note: Flags indicate national team as defined under FIFA eligibility rules; some limited exceptions apply. Players may hold more than one non-FIFA nationality.

No.	Pos.	Nation	Player
7	MF	BIH	Boris Gujić (to (Bosnia and Herzegovina) Sarajevo)
9	FW	SRB	Miroslav Grumić (to Pécs)
11	FW	SEN	Bara Bebeto (loan return to (Switzerland) Lugano)
14	FW	MDA	Serghei Alexeev (to (Russia) Yenisey Krasnoyarsk)
14	MF	GHA	Aaron Dankwah (loan return to (Switzerland) Lugano)
17	MF	SVK	Tomáš Sedlák (to (Austria) Weiden am See)
25	MF	HUN	Péter Farkas (to Vác)
29	DF	HUN	Károly Graszl (to (Cyprus) Nea Salamis)
31	DF	HUN	József Zsók (to Paks)

=== Winter ===
In: Note: Flags indicate national team as defined under FIFA eligibility rules; some limited exceptions apply. Players may hold more than one non-FIFA nationality.

No.	Pos.	Nation	Player
1	GK	HUN	Edvárd Rusák (from Kaposvár II)
23	GK	SRB	Marko Campar (from (Romania) Brazi)
25	MF	SEN	Khaly Thiam (from Kaposvár II)
29	DF	GRE	Lazaros Fotias (from (Greece) Epanomi)

Out: Note: Flags indicate national team as defined under FIFA eligibility rules; some limited exceptions apply. Players may hold more than one non-FIFA nationality.

No.	Pos.	Nation	Player
3	MF	HUN	Olivér Fenyvesi (to Kozármisleny)
6	MF	HUN	György Katona (to Nyíregyháza)
23	GK	HUN	László Horváth (to Szigetszentmiklós)
26	DF	HUN	Zalán Vadas (to Sopron)

- List of Hungarian football transfers summer 2012
- List of Hungarian football transfers winter 2012–13

== Statistics ==
=== Appearances and goals ===
Last updated on 2 June 2013.

No.	Pos	Nat	Player	Total		OTP Bank Liga		Hungarian Cup		League Cup	
No.	Pos	Nat	Player	Apps	Goals	Apps	Goals	Apps	Goals	Apps	Goals
3	MF	(Ghana) GHA	Aaron Dankwah	6	0	6	0	0	0	0	0
4	MF	(Hungary) HUN	Lukács Bőle	13	1	8	0	1	0	4	1
5	DF	(Hungary) HUN	István Bank	24	0	21	0	2	0	1	0
7	MF	(Serbia) SRB	Bojan Pavlović	28	3	27	3	1	0	0	0
8	MF	(Croatia) CRO	Nikola Šafarić	32	0	29	0	2	0	1	0
9	FW	(Hungary) HUN	Róbert Waltner	16	6	16	6	0	0	0	0
10	MF	(Hungary) HUN	Tamás Horváth	18	1	17	1	0	0	1	0
13	DF	(Serbia) SRB	Dražen Okuka	28	1	26	1	1	0	1	0
14	FW	(Hungary) HUN	Lóránt Oláh	29	9	27	8	2	1	0	0
15	MF	(Hungary) HUN	Olivér Kovács	28	1	26	1	1	0	1	0
16	FW	(Guinea) GUI	Moustapha Diallo	11	4	6	2	2	0	3	2
17	FW	(Croatia) CRO	Bojan Vručina	29	3	23	2	2	1	4	0
18	MF	(Hungary) HUN	Benjamin Balázs	33	4	30	4	2	0	1	0
20	DF	(Hungary) HUN	Bence Zámbó	21	2	18	2	1	0	2	0
21	GK	(Slovakia) SVK	Ľuboš Hajdúch	32	-40	30	-38	1	-1	1	-1
24	MF	(Hungary) HUN	Dávid Hegedűs	21	1	19	1	1	0	1	0
25	MF	(Senegal) SEN	Khaly Thiam	12	1	6	1	1	0	5	0
27	FW	(The Gambia) GAM	Jammeh Haruna	25	2	24	2	0	0	1	0
28	DF	(Hungary) HUN	Gábor Jánvári	28	0	24	0	2	0	2	0
29	DF	(Greece) GRE	Lazaros Fotias	1	0	1	0	0	0	0	0
33	MF	(Brazil) BRA	Pedro	30	0	27	0	2	0	1	0
Youth players:
2	DF	(Hungary) HUN	Ádám Major	2	0	0	0	0	0	2	0
6	MF	(Hungary) HUN	Krisztián Kirchner	3	0	0	0	0	0	3	0
7	MF	(Hungary) HUN	Dávid Laczkó	3	0	0	0	0	0	3	0
9	FW	(Hungary) HUN	Árpád Horváth	1	1	0	0	0	0	1	1
10	MF	(Hungary) HUN	Bánk Böröczky	2	0	0	0	0	0	2	0
11	MF	(Hungary) HUN	Bence Házi	5	0	0	0	0	0	5	0
12	DF	(Hungary) HUN	Milán Földes	5	0	0	0	0	0	5	0
14	MF	(Hungary) HUN	Patrik Böjte	3	0	0	0	0	0	3	0
14	DF	(Australia) AUS	Daniel Caccamo	2	0	0	0	0	0	2	0
17	FW	(Montenegro) MNE	Danko Kovačević	5	1	0	0	1	0	4	1
22	MF	(Bosnia and Herzegovina) BIH	Adil Kovačić	2	0	0	0	0	0	2	0
29	GK	(Hungary) HUN	Edvárd Rusák	1	-1	0	0	0	0	1	-1
30	GK	(Hungary) HUN	Zsolt Posza	1	-1	0	0	0	0	1	-1
31	FW	(Serbia) SRB	Dragan Žmukić	3	0	0	0	0	0	3	0
Players no longer at the club:
3	MF	(Hungary) HUN	Olivér Fenyvesi	6	0	0	0	1	0	5	0
6	MF	(Hungary) HUN	György Katona	6	1	2	0	1	0	3	1
23	GK	(Hungary) HUN	László Horváth	5	-6	0	0	1	-1	4	-5
26	DF	(Hungary) HUN	Zalán Vadas	5	0	0	0	0	0	5	0

=== Top scorers ===
Includes all competitive matches. The list is sorted by shirt number when total goals are equal.

Last updated on 2 June 2013

Position	Nation	Number	Name	OTP Bank Liga	Hungarian Cup	League Cup	Total
1	(Hungary)	14	Lóránt Oláh	8	1	0	9
2	(Hungary)	9	Róbert Waltner	6	0	0	6
3	(Hungary)	18	Benjamin Balázs	4	0	0	4
4	(Guinea)	16	Moustapha Diallo	2	0	2	4
5	(Serbia)	7	Bojan Pavlović	3	0	0	3
6	(Croatia)	17	Bojan Vručina	2	1	0	3
7	(Hungary)	20	Bence Zámbó	2	0	0	2
8	(The Gambia)	27	Jammeh Haruna	2	0	0	2
9	(Hungary)	15	Olivér Kovács	1	0	0	1
10	(Hungary)	10	Tamás Horváth	1	0	0	1
11	(Hungary)	24	Dávid Hegedűs	1	0	0	1
12	(Senegal)	25	Khaly Thiam	1	0	0	1
13	(Serbia)	13	Dražen Okuka	1	0	0	1
14	(Montenegro)	17	Danko Kovačević	0	0	1	1
15	(Hungary)	6	György Katona	0	0	1	1
16	(Hungary)	4	Lukács Bőle	0	0	1	1
17	(Hungary)	9	Árpád Horváth	0	0	1	1
/	/	/	Own Goals	1	0	0	1
			TOTALS	35	2	6	43

=== Disciplinary record ===
Includes all competitive matches. Players with 1 card or more included only.

Last updated on 2 June 2013

Position	Nation	Number	Name	OTP Bank Liga		Hungarian Cup		League Cup		Total (Hu Total)	
Position	Nation	Number	Name	Booked	Sent off (straight red)	Booked	Sent off (straight red)	Booked	Sent off (straight red)	Booked	Sent off (straight red)
DF	(Hungary)	2	Ádám Major	0	0	0	0	1	0	1 (0)	0 (0)
MF	(Ghana)	3	Aaron Dankwah	2	0	0	0	0	0	2 (2)	0 (0)
MF	(Hungary)	4	Lukács Bőle	2	0	0	0	1	0	3 (2)	0 (0)
DF	(Hungary)	5	István Bank	3	1	0	0	0	0	3 (3)	1 (1)
MF	(Serbia)	7	Bojan Pavlović	3	0	1	0	0	0	4 (3)	0 (0)
MF	(Hungary)	7	Dávid Laczkó	0	0	0	0	1	0	1 (0)	0 (0)
MF	(Croatia)	8	Nikola Šafarić	5	0	0	0	0	0	5 (5)	0 (0)
FW	(Hungary)	9	Róbert Waltner	1	0	0	0	0	0	1 (1)	0 (0)
DF	(Hungary)	12	Milán Földes	0	0	0	0	1	0	1 (0)	0 (0)
DF	(Serbia)	13	Dražen Okuka	9	0	1	0	1	0	11 (9)	0 (0)
FW	(Hungary)	14	Lóránt Oláh	3	0	0	0	0	0	3 (3)	0 (0)
MF	(Hungary)	15	Olivér Kovács	9	0	0	0	1	1	10 (9)	1 (0)
FW	(Croatia)	17	Bojan Vručina	6	2	0	0	2	0	8 (6)	2 (2)
FW	(Montenegro)	17	Danko Kovačević	0	0	1	0	0	0	1 (0)	0 (0)
MF	(Hungary)	18	Benjamin Balázs	3	0	0	0	0	0	3 (3)	0 (0)
DF	(Hungary)	20	Bence Zámbó	5	0	0	0	0	0	5 (5)	0 (0)
GK	(Slovakia)	21	Ľuboš Hajdúch	4	0	0	0	0	0	4 (4)	0 (0)
GK	(Hungary)	23	László Horváth	0	0	0	1	1	0	1 (0)	1 (0)
MF	(Hungary)	24	Dávid Hegedűs	1	0	0	0	0	0	1 (1)	0 (0)
MF	(Senegal)	25	Khaly Thiam	0	0	0	0	1	1	1 (0)	1 (0)
DF	(Hungary)	26	Zalán Vadas	0	0	0	0	1	0	1 (0)	0 (0)
FW	(The Gambia)	27	Jammeh Haruna	1	0	0	0	0	0	1 (1)	0 (0)
DF	(Hungary)	28	Gábor Jánvári	3	0	0	0	0	0	3 (3)	0 (0)
GK	(Hungary)	29	Edvárd Rusák	0	0	0	0	1	0	1 (0)	0 (0)
FW	(Serbia)	31	Dragan Žmukić	0	0	0	0	2	0	2 (0)	0 (0)
MF	(Brazil)	33	Pedro	9	2	1	0	0	0	10 (9)	2 (2)
			TOTALS	69	5	4	1	14	2	87 (69)	8 (5)

=== Overall ===
Games played	38 (30 OTP Bank Liga, 2 Hungarian Cup and 6 Hungarian League Cup)
Games won	12 (10 OTP Bank Liga, 1 Hungarian Cup and 1 Hungarian League Cup)
Games drawn	9 (7 OTP Bank Liga, 0 Hungarian Cup and 2 Hungarian League Cup)
Games lost	17 (13 OTP Bank Liga, 1 Hungarian Cup and 3 Hungarian League Cup)
Goals scored	43
Goals conceded	48
Goal difference	-5
Yellow cards	87
Red cards	8
Worst discipline	(Brazil) Pedro (10 (yellow card) , 2 (red card) )
Best result	3–0 (H) v BFC Siófok - OTP Bank Liga - 20-10-2012
Best result	3–0 (H) v Lombard-Pápa TFC - OTP Bank Liga - 29-03-2013
Worst result	0–3 (A) v Lombard-Pápa TFC - OTP Bank Liga - 01-09-2012
Most appearances	(Hungary) Benjamin Balázs (33 appearances)
Top scorer	(Hungary) Lóránt Oláh (9 goals)
Points	45/114 (39.47%)

Last updated: 2 June 2013

== Nemzeti Bajnokság I ==
=== Matches ===
29 July 2012 1	MTK Budapest	3–1	Kaposvár	Budapest, Pest County
15:30 CEST	Tischler 12'; Wolfe 67'; Könyves 77'	(Report)	Waltner 90'	Stadium: Hidegkuti Nándor Stadium; Attendance: 1,000; Referee: (Hungary) Roland Veizer

4 August 2012 2	Kaposvár	1–0	Debrecen	Kaposvár, Somogy County
17:00 CEST	Zámbó 27'	(Report)		Stadium: Stadion Kaposvár Rákóczi; Attendance: 2,500; Referee: (Hungary) István Vad

10 August 2012 3	Győr	2–1	Kaposvár	Győr, Győr-Moson-Sopron County
17:00 CEST	Pedro 82' (o.g.); Dina 85'	(Report)	Oláh 44'	Stadium: ETO Park; Attendance: 1,000; Referee: (Hungary) Krisztián Pánczél

17 August 2012 4	Kecskemét	1–2	Kaposvár	Kecskemét, Bács-Kiskun County
19:00 CEST	Sós 15'	(Report)	Vručina 5', 50'	Stadium: Széktói Stadion; Attendance: 2,500; Referee: (Hungary) Gábor Oláh

25 August 2012 5	Kaposvár	1–1	Pécs	Kaposvár, Somogy County
16:00 CEST	Haruna 90+3'	(Report)	Wittrédi 34'	Stadium: Stadion Kaposvár Rákóczi; Attendance: 2,500; Referee: (Hungary) Ádám Farkas

1 September 2012 6	Pápa	3–0	Kaposvár	Pápa, Veszprém County
18:30 CEST	Seye 43'; Maróti 48'; Sekour 67'	(Report)		Stadium: Stadion Várkerti; Attendance: 1,800; Referee: (Hungary) József Erdős

14 September 2012 7	Kaposvár	0–0	Újpest	Kaposvár, Somogy County
17:00 CEST		(Report)		Stadium: Stadion Kaposvár Rákóczi; Attendance: 1,500; Referee: (Hungary) Viktor Kassai

22 September 2012 8	Budapest Honvéd	5–3	Kaposvár	Debrecen, Pest County
16:00 CEST	Diarra 20'; Johnson 30'; Délczeg 33'; Ivancsics 44'; Vécsei 65'	(Report)	Zámbó 40'; Balázs 75'; Haruna 86'	Stadium: Bozsik Stadion; Attendance: 1,500; Referee: (Hungary) Zoltán Iványi

29 September 2012 9	Kaposvár	0–0	Eger	Kaposvár, Somogy County
16:00 CEST		(Report)		Stadium: Stadion Kaposvár Rákóczi; Attendance: 2,000; Referee: (Hungary) Mihály Fábián

6 October 2012 10	Szombathely	0–0	Kaposvár	Szombathely, Vas County
18:30 CEST		(Report)		Stadium: Rohonci Street Stadium; Attendance: 4,500; Referee: (Hungary) Szabolcs Szilasi

20 October 2012 11	Kaposvár	3–0	Siófok	Kaposvár, Somogy County
16:00 CEST	Kovács 40'; Diallo 71', 80'	(Report)		Stadium: Stadion Kaposvár Rákóczi; Attendance: 1,800; Referee: (Hungary) István Vad

27 October 2012 12	Diósgyőr	0–1	Kaposvár	Miskolc, Borsod-Abaúj-Zemplén County
16:00 CEST		(Report)	Horváth 87'	Stadium: DVTK Stadion; Attendance: 7,500; Referee: (Hungary) József Berger

4 November 2012 13	Kaposvár	0–2	Videoton	Kaposvár, Somogy County
16:30 CET		(Report)	Nikolić 47', 79'	Stadium: Stadion Kaposvár Rákóczi; Attendance: 2,000; Referee: (Hungary) Tamás Bognár

10 November 2012 14	Paks	1–2	Kaposvár	Paks, Tolna County
16:00 CET	Lázok 43'	(Report)	Oláh 47' (pen.); Balázs 50'	Stadium: Stadion PSE; Attendance: 500; Referee: (Hungary) Ádám Radványi

18 November 2012 15	Kaposvár	1–0	Ferencváros	Kaposvár, Somogy County
16:30 CET	Pavlović 72'	(Report)		Stadium: Stadion Kaposvár Rákóczi; Attendance: 3,000; Referee: (Hungary) Péter Solymosi

23 November 2012 16	Kaposvár	0–0	MTK Budapest	Kaposvár, Somogy County
17:00 CET		(Report)		Stadium: Stadion Kaposvár Rákóczi; Attendance: 2,000; Referee: (Hungary) Ádám Farkas

30 November 2012 17	Debrecen	2–1	Kaposvár	Debrecen, Hajdú-Bihar County
17:00 CET	Coulibaly 49' (pen.), 62'	(Report)	Pavlović 90+2'	Stadium: Stadion Oláh Gábor Út; Attendance: 1,500; Referee: (Hungary) Sándor Andó-Szabó

2 March 2013 18	Kaposvár	1–2	Győr	Kaposvár, Somogy County
18:30 CET	Oláh 76'	(Report)	Andrić 65'; Kink 90+1'	Stadium: Stadion Kaposvár Rákóczi; Attendance: 2,500; Referee: (Hungary) Zsolt Szabó

8 March 2013 19	Kaposvár	2–3	Kecskemét	Kaposvár, Somogy County
19:00 CET	Oláh 15'; Waltner 81' (pen.)	(Report)	Mohl 19'; Pekár 48'; Burgos 70'	Stadium: Stadion Kaposvár Rákóczi; Attendance: 2,500; Referee: (Hungary) Viktor Kassai

9 April 2013 20	Pécs	0–2	Kaposvár	Pécs, Baranya County
16:00 CEST		(Report)	Waltner 49'; Pavlović 61'	Stadium: Stadion PMFC; Attendance: 1,800; Referee: (Hungary) István Vad

29 March 2013 21	Kaposvár	3–0	Pápa	Kaposvár, Somogy County
17:00 CET	Waltner 81'; Oláh 84' (pen.); Balázs 90+1'	(Report)		Stadium: Stadion Kaposvár Rákóczi; Attendance: 1,000; Referee: (Hungary) Sándor Andó-Szabó

5 April 2013 22	Újpest	1–0	Kaposvár	Budapest, Pest County
17:00 CEST	Vasiljević 32'	(Report)		Stadium: Szusza Ferenc Stadium; Attendance: 1,000; Referee: (Hungary) Ádám Németh

12 April 2013 23	Kaposvár	1–2	Budapest Honvéd	Kaposvár, Somogy County
17:00 CEST	Waltner 14'	(Report)	Tchami 60' (pen.); Lanzafame 67'	Stadium: Stadion Kaposvár Rákóczi; Attendance: 2,000; Referee: (Hungary) József Berger

20 April 2013 24	Eger	1–0	Kaposvár	Vác, Pest County
16:00 CEST	Farkas 34'	(Report)		Stadium: Stadion Városi Vác; Attendance: 62; Referee: (Hungary) Roland Veizer

27 April 2013 25	Kaposvár	3–2	Szombathely	Kaposvár, Somogy County
16:00 CEST	Hegedűs 34'; Oláh 47', 60' (pen.)	(Report)	Andorka 46'; Ugrai 90'	Stadium: Stadion Kaposvár Rákóczi; Attendance: 2,000; Referee: (Hungary) Ádám Németh

4 May 2013 26	Siófok	2–1	Kaposvár	Siófok, Somogy County
18:30 CEST	Windecker 15'; Melczer 56'	(Report)	Oláh 31' (pen.)	Stadium: Révész Street Stadium; Attendance: 500; Referee: (Hungary) Gergely Szőts

10 May 2013 27	Kaposvár	1–1	Diósgyőr	Kaposvár, Somogy County
19:00 CEST	Vági 50' (o.g.)	(Report)	Fernando 31'	Stadium: Stadion Kaposvár Rákóczi; Attendance: 2,500; Referee: (Hungary) Tamás Bognár

18 May 2013 28	Videoton	2–1	Kaposvár	Székesfehérvár, Fejér County
18:30 CEST	Alvarez 29'; Kovács 54'	(Report)	Thiam 77'	Stadium: Stadion Sóstói; Attendance: 3,000; Referee: (Hungary) Péter Solymosi

25 May 2013 29	Kaposvár	1–0	Paks	Kaposvár, Somogy County
14:00 CEST	Balázs 36'	(Report)		Stadium: Stadion Kaposvár Rákóczi; Attendance: 1,000; Referee: (Hungary) Mihály Fábián

31 May 2013 30	Ferencváros	2–2	Kaposvár	Győr, Győr-Moson-Sopron County
19:00 CEST	Böde 21' (pen.), 60' (pen.)	(Report)	Okuka 55'; Waltner 84' (pen.)	Stadium: ETO Park; Attendance: 4,000; Referee: (Hungary) Zsolt Szabó

=== Classification ===
Pos	Team	Pld	W	D	L	GF	GA	GD	Pts
9	Újpest	30	11	8	11	40	42	−2	41
10	Diósgyőr	30	9	11	10	31	39	−8	38
11	Kaposvári Rákóczi	30	10	7	13	35	38	−3	37
12	Pécs	30	10	7	13	33	44	−11	37
13	Paks	30	8	11	11	40	38	+2	35

Source: mlsz.hu (in Hungarian)
Rules for classification: 1st points; 2nd overall wins; 3rd goal difference; 4th head-to-head points; 5th head-to-head goal difference; 6th head-to-head away goals scored; 7th fair-play points; 8th drawing of lots

=== Results summary ===
Overall								Home						Away					
Pld	W	D	L	GF	GA	GD	Pts	W	D	L	GF	GA	GD	W	D	L	GF	GA	GD
30	10	7	13	35	38	−3	37	6	5	4	18	13	+5	4	2	9	17	25	−8

Last updated: 2 June 2013.
Source: NB1

=== Results by round ===
Round	1	2	3	4	5	6	7	8	9	10	11	12	13	14	15	16	17	18	19	20	21	22	23	24	25	26	27	28	29	30
Ground	A	H	A	A	H	A	H	A	H	A	H	A	H	A	H	H	A	H	H	A	H	A	H	A	H	A	H	A	H	A
Result	L	W	L	W	D	L	D	L	D	D	W	W	L	W	W	D	L	L	L	W	W	L	L	L	W	L	D	L	W	D
Position	15	8	10	8	8	8	11	14	13	13	11	9	11	7	6	6	8	10	11	10	7	9	11	12	11	12	12	12	11	11

Updated to match(es) played on 2 June 2013. Source: Matches
A = Away; H = Home; W = Win; D = Draw; L = Loss

== Hungarian Cup ==
26 September 2012 2	Gyirmót	1–2	Kaposvár	Győr, Győr-Moson-Sopron County
17:00 CEST	Oross 78'	(Report)	Oláh 18'; Vručina 54'	Stadium: Gyirmóti Sporttelep; Attendance: 300; Referee: (Hungary) Dániel Becséri

30 October 2012 3	Dunaújváros	1–0	Kaposvár	Dunaújváros, Fejér County
12:30 CET	Godslove 4'	(Report)		Stadium: Dunaferr Arena; Attendance: 250; Referee: (Hungary) Béla Botló

== League Cup ==
=== Group stage ===
5 September 2012 1	Kaposvár	1–1	Videoton	Kaposvár, Somogy County
18:00 CEST	Kovačević 1'	(Report)	Paraiba 26'	Stadium: Stadion Kaposvár Rákóczi; Attendance: 150; Referee: (Hungary) Balázs Berke

12 September 2012 2	Zalaegerszeg	2–1	Kaposvár	Zalaegerszeg, Zala County
18:00 CEST	Tóth 28', 29'	(Report)	Diallo 64'	Stadium: ZTE Arena; Attendance: 500; Referee: (Hungary) Zoltán J. Kovács

10 October 2012 3	Pápa	2–1	Kaposvár	Pápa, Veszprém County
16:00 CEST	Seye 58', 67'	(Report)	Katona 79' (pen.)	Stadium: Stadion Várkerti; Attendance: 200; Referee: (Hungary) Gábor Oláh

7 December 2012 4	Kaposvár	2–1	Pápa	Kaposvár, Somogy County
13:00 CET	Bőle 50' (pen.); Horváth 59'	(Report)	Rodenbücher 12' (pen.)	Stadium: Stadion Kaposvár Rákóczi; Attendance: 150; Referee: (Hungary) Csaba Pintér

13 November 2012 5	Kaposvár	1–1	Zalaegerszeg	Kaposvár, Somogy County
14:00 CET	Diallo 43'	(Report)	Babati 69'	Stadium: Stadion Kaposvár Rákóczi; Attendance: 100; Referee: (Hungary) Gyöngyi Gaál

13 October 2012 6	Videoton	1–0	Kaposvár	Székesfehérvár, Fejér County
17:00 CEST	Nikolić 76'	(Report)		Stadium: Sóstói Stadion; Attendance: 1,300; Referee: (Hungary) Balázs Berke

==== Classification ====
Pos	Team	Pld	W	D	L	GF	GA	GD	Pts	Qualification
1	Videoton	6	4	1	1	9	3	+6	13	Advance to knockout phase
2	Pápa	6	4	0	2	9	8	+1	12	Advance to knockout phase
3	Kaposvár	6	1	2	3	6	8	−2	5	
4	Zalaegerszeg	6	1	1	4	5	10	−5	4	

Rules for classification: 1) points; 2) goal difference; 3) number of goals scored.
