= List of Hungarian football transfers winter 2011–12 =

This is a list of Hungarian football transfers for the 2011–12 winter transfer window by club. Only transfers of clubs in the OTP Bank Liga are included.

The winter transfer window opened on 1 January 2012, although a few transfers may have taken place prior to that date. The window closed at midnight on 31 February 2012. Players without a club may join one at any time, either during or in between transfer windows.

== OTP Bank Liga ==
=== BFC Siófok ===
In: Note: Flags indicate national team as defined under FIFA eligibility rules; some limited exceptions apply. Players may hold more than one non-FIFA nationality.

No.	Pos.	Nation	Player
1	GK	HUN	Márk Heinrich (from (Austria) SC Oberpullendorf)
6	MF	HUN	Tamás Egerszegi (on loan from Újpest FC)
8	MF	HUN	Norbert Heffler (on loan from Paksi SE)
9	FW	HUN	Attila Simon (from Kecskeméti TE)
12	GK	SVK	Ladislav Rybánsky (from Kecskeméti TE)
14	FW	HUN	Szabolcs Pál (on loan from Diósgyőri VTK)
17	DF	HUN	István Nagy (on loan from Paksi SE)
25	FW	HUN	Zsolt Haraszti (on loan from Videoton FC)
29	DF	CMR	Eugene Fomumbod (from Győri ETO FC)
—	FW	HUN	Patrik Krómer (from Szigetszentmiklósi TK)

Out: Note: Flags indicate national team as defined under FIFA eligibility rules; some limited exceptions apply. Players may hold more than one non-FIFA nationality.

No.	Pos.	Nation	Player
6	DF	HUN	Richárd Tusori
8	MF	HUN	Norbert Lattenstein (to Budaörsi SC)
9	FW	HUN	Péter Bali (to Veszprém FC)
12	GK	HUN	Tamás Mester (loan return to Ferencvárosi TC)
12	GK	HUN	Zoltán Szatmári
14	DF	HUN	Dániel Köntös (to Dunafém-Maroshegy SE)
16	FW	HUN	Imre Csermelyi (to Lombard-Pápa TFC)
17	FW	UKR	Denys Rebryk (to Ceglédi VSE)
18	DF	HUN	János Szabó (loan return to Paksi SE)
24	MF	HUN	Attila Horváth (on loan to FC Ajka)
25	FW	HUN	Zsolt Haraszti (loan return to Paksi SE)
29	FW	MNE	Bojan Božović (on loan to Budapest Honvéd FC)

=== Budapest Honvéd FC ===
In: Note: Flags indicate national team as defined under FIFA eligibility rules; some limited exceptions apply. Players may hold more than one non-FIFA nationality.

No.	Pos.	Nation	Player
14	FW	BIH	Emir Hadžić (from (Bosnia and Herzegovina) NK Čelik Zenica)
15	DF	MNE	Marko Vidović (from (Bulgaria) PFC Levski Sofia)
18	FW	MNE	Bojan Božović (on loan from BFC Siófok)
19	FW	BRA	Nicolas Ceolin (on loan from Győri ETO FC)
21	MF	ARG	Matías Sebastián Porcari (from (Uruguay) Centro Atlético Fénix)
57	DF	CHI	Tomás Díaz Navarrete (on loan from (Belgium) R.U. Saint-Gilloise)
70	FW	HUN	Milán Faggyas (from (Austria) SV Mattersburg II)

Out: Note: Flags indicate national team as defined under FIFA eligibility rules; some limited exceptions apply. Players may hold more than one non-FIFA nationality.

No.	Pos.	Nation	Player
14	FW	HUN	Sándor Torghelle (to Videoton FC)
15	DF	HUN	Kálmán Tisza (to Szolnoki MÁV FC)
16	FW	HUN	Roland Vólent (on loan to Soproni VSE)
17	FW	SEN	Dieng Cheikh Abass (on loan to (Vietnam) Sông Lam Nghệ An F.C.)
18	MF	SVK	Marek Kostoláni (to (Austria) ASK Mannersdorf)
19	FW	BRA	Danilo (to (Switzerland) FC Sion)
21	FW	HUN	Zoltán Hercegfalvi (to Vasas SC)
28	FW	MNE	Radislav Sekulić
30	MF	CZE	Lukáš Zelenka (to (Czech Republic) 1. SK Prostějov)
70	MF	NGR	Harmony Ikande (to (Israel) Beitar Jerusalem F.C.)

=== Debreceni VSC ===
In: Note: Flags indicate national team as defined under FIFA eligibility rules; some limited exceptions apply. Players may hold more than one non-FIFA nationality.

No.	Pos.	Nation	Player
13	MF	HUN	Bence Ludánszki (from Debreceni VSC II)
14	FW	NGR	Eugène Salami (loan return from Nyíregyháza Spartacus)
26	MF	HUN	Norbert Kardos (loan return from Kaposvári Rákóczi FC)
91	FW	HUN	Ádám Balajti (loan return from Újpest FC)
99	FW	GAB	Roguy Méyé (from Zalaegerszegi TE)
—	MF	HUN	Ádám Szabó (from MTK Budapest FC)

Out: Note: Flags indicate national team as defined under FIFA eligibility rules; some limited exceptions apply. Players may hold more than one non-FIFA nationality.

No.	Pos.	Nation	Player
19	FW	BRA	Vinícius (on loan to Nyíregyháza Spartacus FC)
21	DF	HUN	Marcell Fodor (to Újpest FC)
23	FW	HUN	Péter Szilágyi (on loan to Lombard-Pápa TFC)
24	DF	MKD	Mirsad Mijadinoski (to (Switzerland) FC Wil)
26	MF	HUN	Norbert Kardos (to Gyirmót SE)
31	GK	LTU	Mindaugas Malinauskas (to (Lithuania) FK Šiauliai)
38	FW	HUN	Szabolcs Csorba (on loan to Nyíregyháza Spartacus FC)
40	FW	EST	Vjatšeslav Zahovaiko
91	FW	HUN	Ádám Balajti (on loan to MTK Budapest FC)
—	MF	HUN	Ádám Szabó (on loan to Mezőkövesd-Zsóry SE)

=== Diósgyőri VTK ===
In: Note: Flags indicate national team as defined under FIFA eligibility rules; some limited exceptions apply. Players may hold more than one non-FIFA nationality.

No.	Pos.	Nation	Player
15	DF	HUN	András Vági (from (Switzerland) FC Aarau)
20	MF	ESP	Fernando (from (Spain) Málaga CF)
27	MF	MAR	Youssef Sekour (from (Norway) Lillestrøm SK)
75	DF	BRA	Bernardo Frizoni (from (Slovakia) FK Bodva Moldava nad Bodvou)

Out: Note: Flags indicate national team as defined under FIFA eligibility rules; some limited exceptions apply. Players may hold more than one non-FIFA nationality.

No.	Pos.	Nation	Player
9	FW	ESP	Enrique Carreño (to (Spain) Real Zaragoza B)
16	MF	HUN	Tibor Halgas (on loan to Kazincbarcikai SC)
19	MF	HUN	Péter Szabó (on loan to Kazincbarcikai SC)
21	FW	CMR	George Menougong
24	FW	HUN	Szabolcs Pál (on loan to BFC Siófok)
37	MF	SVK	Richárd Illés (on loan to Kazincbarcikai SC)

=== Ferencvárosi TC ===
In: Note: Flags indicate national team as defined under FIFA eligibility rules; some limited exceptions apply. Players may hold more than one non-FIFA nationality.

No.	Pos.	Nation	Player
12	GK	HUN	Tamás Mester (loan return from BFC Siófok)
17	MF	HUN	Bence Batik (from Szeged 2011)
22	MF	HUN	Attila Busai (from (Switzerland) FC Wil)
27	MF	HUN	Dávid Kulcsár (from Vasas SC)
41	GK	HUN	Roland Kunsági (from Rákospalotai EAC)
88	FW	BRA	Somália (from (Brazil) Bangu AC)
99	FW	HUN	Gergő Beliczky (from Vasas SC)
—	MF	HUN	Márk Orosz (from Szeged 2011)

Out: Note: Flags indicate national team as defined under FIFA eligibility rules; some limited exceptions apply. Players may hold more than one non-FIFA nationality.

No.	Pos.	Nation	Player
9	FW	BRA	Felipe Félix (to (Brazil) Botafogo FC)
10	MF	BRA	Anderzinho (to (Brazil) Paysandu SC)
12	GK	HUN	Tamás Mester (on loan to Budaörsi SC)
14	FW	JPN	Kazuo Homma
17	FW	BRA	Alison
17	FW	HUN	Viktor Bölcsföldi (on loan to Szigetszentmiklósi TK)
30	MF	HUN	Bence Tóth (to Lombard-Pápa TFC)
85	DF	HUN	Csaba Csizmadia (to Gyirmót SE)
87	MF	HUN	László Fitos (to Gyirmót SE)
88	FW	BRA	Somália (loan return to (Brazil) Bangu AC)

=== Győri ETO FC ===
In: Note: Flags indicate national team as defined under FIFA eligibility rules; some limited exceptions apply. Players may hold more than one non-FIFA nationality.

No.	Pos.	Nation	Player
3	DF	GEO	Lasha Totadze (loan return from Lombard-Pápa TFC)
11	FW	HUN	Roland Varga (from (Italy) Brescia Calcio)
17	MF	HUN	Máté Pátkai (from MTK Budapest FC)
24	MF	BIH	Đorđe Kamber (from Zalaegerszegi TE)
30	MF	GEO	Giorgi Ganugrava (loan return from Lombard-Pápa TFC)

Out: Note: Flags indicate national team as defined under FIFA eligibility rules; some limited exceptions apply. Players may hold more than one non-FIFA nationality.

No.	Pos.	Nation	Player
3	DF	GEO	Lasha Totadze (to (Georgia (country)) FC Dila Gori)
3	FW	BRA	André Lamas
11	FW	BRA	Nicolas Ceolin (on loan to Budapest Honvéd FC)
13	MF	GAB	Arsène Copa (to (Slovakia) FK DAC 1904 Dunajská Streda)
20	MF	ROU	Mihai Nicorec (on loan to Zalaegerszegi TE)
30	MF	GEO	Giorgi Ganugrava (on loan to Zalaegerszegi TE)
37	DF	HUN	Gábor Bieder (on loan to Soproni VSE)
49	MF	ROU	István Berde (to Gyirmót SE)
—	MF	CRO	Vanja Despotović (on loan to Soproni VSE)
—	GK	HUN	László Gyűrű (on loan to Soproni VSE)
—	MF	HUN	András Simon (on loan to Soproni VSE)
—	DF	HUN	Zoltán Kovács (to Vecsési FC)

=== Kaposvári Rákóczi FC ===
In: Note: Flags indicate national team as defined under FIFA eligibility rules; some limited exceptions apply. Players may hold more than one non-FIFA nationality.

No.	Pos.	Nation	Player
10	DF	HUN	Tamás Horváth (from Kaposvári Rákóczi FC II)
11	FW	SEN	Bara Bebeto (on loan from (Switzerland) FC Lugano)
14	MF	GHA	Aaron Dankwah (on loan from (Switzerland) FC Lugano)
16	FW	GUI	Moustapha Diallo (from Kaposvári Rákóczi FC II)
17	MF	SVK	Tomáš Sedlák (from (Slovakia) MFK Ružomberok)
27	FW	GAM	Jammeh Haruna (from Kaposvári Rákóczi FC II)
—	DF	HUN	Ádám Major (from Kaposvári Rákóczi FC II)
—	MF	HUN	Olivér Fenyvesi (from Kaposvári Rákóczi FC II)

Out: Note: Flags indicate national team as defined under FIFA eligibility rules; some limited exceptions apply. Players may hold more than one non-FIFA nationality.

No.	Pos.	Nation	Player
3	FW	SRB	Milan Perić (to Videoton FC)
10	MF	HUN	Kornél Kulcsár (to Szombathelyi Haladás)
11	MF	MAR	Daniane Jawad
14	FW	MDA	Serghei Alexeev (on loan to (Israel) Maccabi Netanya F.C.)
16	FW	HUN	Gábor Reszli (to Nagyatádi FC)
17	DF	SRB	Petar Mudreša
26	MF	HUN	Norbert Kardos (loan return to Debreceni VSC)
—	MF	HUN	Valentin Berdó (to Bajai LSE)
—	MF	HUN	Bence Házi (on loan to BKV Előre SC)
—	DF	HUN	Zalán Vadas (on loan to BKV Előre SC)

=== Kecskeméti TE ===
In: Note: Flags indicate national team as defined under FIFA eligibility rules; some limited exceptions apply. Players may hold more than one non-FIFA nationality.

No.	Pos.	Nation	Player
4	DF	HUN	Róbert Varga (from Zalaegerszegi TE)
9	FW	HUN	Marcell Balog (loan return from Ceglédi VSE)
20	MF	HUN	Balázs Sarus (from Nyíregyháza Spartacus)
22	MF	HUN	István Bagi (loan return from Mezőkövesd-Zsóry SE)
55	FW	HUN	Attila Tököli (loan return from Zalaegerszegi TE)
83	GK	HUN	Csaba Borszéki (from Dunakanyar-Vác FC)

Out: Note: Flags indicate national team as defined under FIFA eligibility rules; some limited exceptions apply. Players may hold more than one non-FIFA nationality.

No.	Pos.	Nation	Player
4	DF	SRB	Siniša Radanović (to (Serbia) FK Borac Čačak)
9	FW	HUN	Attila Simon (to BFC Siófok)
11	FW	BIH	Jovica Stokić (to (Serbia) FK BSK Borča)
16	DF	HUN	Pál Urbán (to Dunaújváros Pálhalma SE)
17	MF	CGO	Christian Ebala (on loan to (Kazakhstan) FC Astana)
20	MF	CAF	Foxi Kethevoama (on loan to (Kazakhstan) FC Astana)
22	MF	HUN	István Bagi (to Mezőkövesd-Zsóry SE)
23	FW	CAN	Igor Pisanjuk (to Egri FC)
24	FW	HUN	Gábor Urbán (to Szigetszentmiklósi TK)
25	DF	NED	Kelvin Maynard
27	MF	HUN	Ádám Gyurcsó (loan return to Videoton FC)
28	GK	SVK	Ladislav Rybánsky (to BFC Siófok)
92	MF	HUN	András Farkas

=== Lombard-Pápa TFC ===
In: Note: Flags indicate national team as defined under FIFA eligibility rules; some limited exceptions apply. Players may hold more than one non-FIFA nationality.

No.	Pos.	Nation	Player
6	FW	SEN	Mouhamadou Seye (from (Greece) Panetolikos F.C.)
7	MF	HUN	Bence Tóth (from Ferencvárosi TC)
8	FW	SLO	Jože Benko (from (China) Wuhan Zall F.C.)
9	DF	SRB	Lazar Arsić (from Vasas SC)
11	FW	HUN	Péter Szilágyi (on loan from Debreceni VSC)
23	DF	HUN	Balázs Balogh (from (Finland) Kuopion Palloseura)
42	FW	HUN	Imre Csermelyi (from BFC Siófok)
87	FW	FIN	Antonio Inutile (from (Finland) Vaasan Palloseura)

Out: Note: Flags indicate national team as defined under FIFA eligibility rules; some limited exceptions apply. Players may hold more than one non-FIFA nationality.

No.	Pos.	Nation	Player
7	MF	GEO	Giorgi Ganugrava (loan return to Győri ETO FC)
9	FW	HUN	Tamás Germán (to Nyíregyháza Spartacus)
13	FW	HUN	István Ferenczi (to Gyirmót SE)
15	MF	LAT	Vadims Žuļevs
18	DF	HUN	Gábor Varga (to Vasas SC)
21	FW	SRB	Goran Marić (to (Kazakhstan) FC Zhetysu)
22	DF	GEO	Lasha Totadze (loan return to Győri ETO FC)
33	GK	HUN	Vilmos Kovács (to Nyúl SC)
77	DF	HUN	Kornél Kaszás (on loan to Dunaújváros Pálhalma SE)
88	MF	EST	Sander Puri (loan return to (Greece) AEL)

=== Paksi SE ===
In: Note: Flags indicate national team as defined under FIFA eligibility rules; some limited exceptions apply. Players may hold more than one non-FIFA nationality.

No.	Pos.	Nation	Player
30	DF	HUN	János Szabó (loan return from BFC Siófok)
87	MF	HUN	Márton Eppel (from (Netherlands) N.E.C. Nijmegen)
91	FW	HUN	Zsolt Haraszti (loan return from BFC Siófok)
—	MF	HUN	Gergő Lakatos (from Paksi SE II)

Out: Note: Flags indicate national team as defined under FIFA eligibility rules; some limited exceptions apply. Players may hold more than one non-FIFA nationality.

No.	Pos.	Nation	Player
2	DF	HUN	István Nagy (on loan to BFC Siófok)
27	MF	HUN	Norbert Heffler (on loan to BFC Siófok)
87	FW	HUN	Barnabás Vári (on loan to Szolnoki MÁV FC)
91	FW	HUN	Zsolt Haraszti (to Videoton FC)

=== Pécsi Mecsek FC ===
In: Note: Flags indicate national team as defined under FIFA eligibility rules; some limited exceptions apply. Players may hold more than one non-FIFA nationality.

No.	Pos.	Nation	Player
3	DF	BIH	Vlado Marković (from (Albania) Teuta Durrës)
6	DF	HUN	Ferenc Fodor (loan return from Kozármisleny SE)
6	MF	CRO	Goran Paracki (from (Croatia) NK Karlovac)
11	MF	GHA	Ellis Samuel Ato (loan return from Kozármisleny SE)
16	GK	HUN	Csaba Sólyom (loan return from Kozármisleny SE)
20	FW	NGR	Solomon Okoronkwo (from (Norway) Aalesunds FK)
22	DF	GEO	Irakliy Kvekveskiri (loan return from Szigetszentmiklósi TK)
26	FW	NGR	Egejuru Godslove (loan return from Kozármisleny SE)
27	MF	HUN	István Eszlátyi (loan return from Kozármisleny SE)
—	FW	SVK	Zoltán Harsányi (from (Slovakia) FK DAC 1904 Dunajská Streda)
—	MF	HUN	Erik Nagy (from Kozármisleny SE)

Out: Note: Flags indicate national team as defined under FIFA eligibility rules; some limited exceptions apply. Players may hold more than one non-FIFA nationality.

No.	Pos.	Nation	Player
6	DF	HUN	Ferenc Fodor (on loan to Kozármisleny SE)
8	DF	HUN	Attila Pintér (on loan to Kozármisleny SE)
13	MF	HUN	Dávid Pákolicz (on loan to Nyíregyháza Spartacus)
13	MF	HUN	Miroszláv Zsdrál (on loan to Kozármisleny SE)
16	GK	HUN	Csaba Sólyom (to Kozármisleny SE)
19	FW	HUN	Szabolcs Gyánó (on loan to Kozármisleny SE)
25	MF	HUN	Zoltán Tóth (to Kozármisleny SE)
26	FW	NGR	Egejuru Godslove (to Dunaújváros Pálhalma SE)
27	MF	HUN	István Eszlátyi (on loan to BKV Előre SC)
27	DF	HUN	Viktor Petrók (to (Austria) Bad Schallerbach)
85	DF	HUN	Tamás Törtei (to Szolnoki MÁV FC)

=== Szombathelyi Haladás ===
In: Note: Flags indicate national team as defined under FIFA eligibility rules; some limited exceptions apply. Players may hold more than one non-FIFA nationality.

No.	Pos.	Nation	Player
10	MF	HUN	Kornél Kulcsár (from Kaposvári Rákóczi FC)
21	MF	HUN	Dániel Nagy (on loan from Videoton FC)

Out: Note: Flags indicate national team as defined under FIFA eligibility rules; some limited exceptions apply. Players may hold more than one non-FIFA nationality.

No.	Pos.	Nation	Player
3	DF	HUN	Gábor Nagy (to Gyirmót SE)
10	MF	HUN	István Kovács (to Videoton FC)
14	DF	HUN	Szabolcs Szvodoba (on loan to Budaörsi SC)
17	FW	HUN	Attila Simon (loan to Ceglédi VSE)

=== Újpest FC ===
In: Note: Flags indicate national team as defined under FIFA eligibility rules; some limited exceptions apply. Players may hold more than one non-FIFA nationality.

No.	Pos.	Nation	Player
2	DF	HUN	Marcell Fodor (from Debreceni VSC)
6	MF	SRB	Dušan Vasiljević (from Videoton FC)
9	FW	SRB	Nikon Jevtić (from (Austria) SC Wiener Neustadt)
15	MF	BEL	Nikolas Proesmans (from (Belgium) Sint-Truidense V.V.)
32	MF	TOG	Henri Eninful (on loan from (Belgium) Standard Liège)
—	GK	HUN	Tamás Floszmann (from Dunaújváros Pálhalma SE)
—	MF	HUN	Bálint Tóth (from Újpest FC II)

Out: Note: Flags indicate national team as defined under FIFA eligibility rules; some limited exceptions apply. Players may hold more than one non-FIFA nationality.

No.	Pos.	Nation	Player
2	DF	NED	Ferne Snoyl
3	DF	HUN	Vilmos Szalai (to (Germany) Wormatia Worms)
6	DF	HUN	Zoltán Takács (on loan to Vasas SC)
9	FW	HUN	Ádám Balajti (loan return to Debreceni VSC)
15	DF	HUN	Tamás Rubus (on loan to Vasas SC)
23	GK	HUN	Antal Bozsó (to Soproni VSE)
31	FW	HUN	Bence Szabó (on loan to Vasas SC)
32	MF	HUN	Tamás Egerszegi (on loan to BFC Siófok)
42	FW	HUN	Attila Széki
—	FW	HUN	Dávid Erős (on loan to Várpalotai Bányász)
—	FW	HUN	Dávid Kocsis (to Szolnoki MÁV FC)
—	DF	HUN	Tamás Petrezselyem (to Dunakeszi VSE)

=== Vasas SC ===
In: Note: Flags indicate national team as defined under FIFA eligibility rules; some limited exceptions apply. Players may hold more than one non-FIFA nationality.

No.	Pos.	Nation	Player
3	DF	HUN	Gábor Varga (from Lombard-Pápa TFC)
4	DF	HUN	Máté Tóth (from (Czech Republic) FC Hradec Králové)
9	FW	HUN	Bence Szabó (on loan from Újpest FC)
11	MF	HUN	Ádám Kovács (from Nyíregyháza Spartacus)
13	DF	HUN	Zoltán Takács (on loan from Újpest FC)
14	FW	HUN	Zoltán Hercegfalvi (from Budapest Honvéd FC II)
16	DF	HUN	Balázs Venczel (from Lombard-Pápa TFC)
19	MF	HUN	Tamás Kiss (on loan from Rákospalotai EAC)
23	DF	HUN	Tamás Rubus (on loan from Újpest FC)

Out: Note: Flags indicate national team as defined under FIFA eligibility rules; some limited exceptions apply. Players may hold more than one non-FIFA nationality.

No.	Pos.	Nation	Player
2	DF	HUN	László Szűcs (on loan to Sársápi Bányász)
4	DF	ROU	Mirel Soare (to (Romania) FC Argeş Piteşti)
7	MF	HUN	Dávid Kulcsár (to Ferencvárosi TC)
8	MF	HUN	Szabolcs Bakos (on loan to Bajai LSE)
9	FW	HUN	Gergő Beliczky (to Ferencvárosi TC)
13	DF	HUN	Gábor Kocsis (to Dunaújváros Pálhalma SE)
14	MF	SRB	Lazar Arsić (to Lombard-Pápa TFC)
17	FW	CRO	Marko Šimić (to Ferencvárosi TC)
19	MF	SRB	Miloš Jokić (to (Ukraine) FC Metalurh Zaporizhzhia)
36	DF	SVK	Jozef Gašpar
55	DF	HUN	László Sütő (loan return to MTK Budapest FC)
92	GK	HUN	Róbert Ambrusics (to (England) Cambridge United F.C.)

=== Videoton FC ===
In: Note: Flags indicate national team as defined under FIFA eligibility rules; some limited exceptions apply. Players may hold more than one non-FIFA nationality.

No.	Pos.	Nation	Player
7	DF	BRA	Jeff Silva (from (Brazil) Clube Náutico Capibaribe)
18	FW	SRB	Milan Perić (from Kaposvári Rákóczi FC)
28	FW	HUN	Sándor Torghelle (from Budapest Honvéd FC)
70	MF	HUN	István Kovács (from Szombathelyi Haladás)
77	MF	HUN	Ádám Gyurcsó (loan return from Kecskeméti TE)
99	MF	SRB	Uros Nikolić (from (Serbia) FK Partizan)
—	FW	HUN	Zsolt Haraszti (from Paksi SE)

Out: Note: Flags indicate national team as defined under FIFA eligibility rules; some limited exceptions apply. Players may hold more than one non-FIFA nationality.

No.	Pos.	Nation	Player
6	MF	SRB	Dušan Vasiljević (to Újpest FC)
13	GK	HUN	Bence Somodi (on loan to Gyirmót SE)
21	FW	BRA	Andre Alves (to (Cyprus) AC Omonia)
22	MF	HUN	Dániel Nagy (on loan to Szombathelyi Haladás)
25	MF	HUN	Ákos Elek (on loan to (Turkey) Eskişehirspor)
—	FW	HUN	Zsolt Haraszti (on loan to BFC Siófok)

=== Zalaegerszegi TE ===
In: Note: Flags indicate national team as defined under FIFA eligibility rules; some limited exceptions apply. Players may hold more than one non-FIFA nationality.

No.	Pos.	Nation	Player
4	MF	GEO	Giorgi Ganugrava (on loan from Győri ETO FC)
8	DF	SLO	Leon Panikvar (from (Scotland) Kilmarnock F.C.)
10	FW	HUN	Roland Polareczki (loan return from (Slovenia) NK Nafta Lendava)
20	MF	ROU	Mihai Nicorec (on loan from Győri ETO FC)
26	FW	HUN	Ádám Vittman (loan return from FC Ajka)
28	DF	HUN	Adrián Kocsis (loan return from (Slovenia) NK Nafta Lendava)
31	FW	HUN	Bálint Gaál (loan return from FC Ajka)

Out: Note: Flags indicate national team as defined under FIFA eligibility rules; some limited exceptions apply. Players may hold more than one non-FIFA nationality.

No.	Pos.	Nation	Player
1	GK	HUN	Dávid Palásthy (loan return to Dunakanyar-Vác FC)
4	DF	HUN	Róbert Varga (to Kecskeméti TE)
7	MF	AUT	Ahmet Delić (to Soproni VSE)
8	FW	AUT	Aleksandar Stanisavljević (to (Austria) SC Sollenau)
10	MF	MNE	Ivan Delić
11	FW	LAT	Daniils Turkovs (to (Latvia) FK Ventspils)
19	MF	BIH	Đorđe Kamber (to Győri ETO FC)
20	DF	EGY	Sameh Sherif
22	DF	SRB	Radoš Bulatović (to (Serbia) FK Novi Pazar)
23	FW	GAB	Roguy Méyé (to Debreceni VSC)
55	FW	HUN	Attila Tököli (loan return to Kecskeméti TE)
89	MF	ROU	Vlad Bujor (to (Romania) FCM Târgu Mureș)
