= Milan Perić =

Serbian footballer (born 1986)

Personal information
- Date of birth: 16 April 1986 (age 40)
- Place of birth: Čačak, SFR Yugoslavia
- Height: 1.82 m (6 ft 0 in)
- Position: Striker

Youth career
- Borac Čačak

Senior career*
Years	Team	Apps	(Gls)
2004–2006	Mladost Lučani	61	(31)
2006	Tavriya Simferopol	0	(0)
2007–2008	Hajduk Kula	31	(8)
2008–2009	Partizan	1	(0)
2009	→ Jagodina (loan)	13	(2)
2009–2010	Mladi Radnik	5	(0)
2010	→ Metalac GM (loan)	11	(2)
2010–2011	Kaposvár	42	(19)
2012–2014	Videoton	5	(2)
2012–2013	→ Ferencváros (loan)	16	(4)
2014	→ Pécs (loan)	5	(0)
2014	→ Dunaújváros (loan)	8	(2)
2015	Mladost Velika Obarska	12	(0)
2015	Panegialios	12	(2)
2016	Qingdao Red Lions	0	(0)
2016	Bežanija	11	(2)
2017	TSC	3	(0)
2017	Sloboda Užice	4	(0)
2018	AO Loutraki		
2018–2019	Zvezdara		
2019	BSK Borča		

International career
2007–2008	Serbia U21	5	(0)
- * Club domestic league appearances and goals

Milan Perić (Serbian Cyrillic: Милан Перић; born 16 April 1986) is a Serbian retired footballer who played as a striker.

== Club career ==
On 5 July 2008, Perić signed a four-year contract with Partizan, receiving the number 9 shirt. He only made four appearances for the club, including one domestic league appearance (against Rad), one Serbian Cup appearance (against Mladost Apatin), one UEFA Cup appearance (against Timișoara), and one friendly against PAOK, scoring a goal in a 3–1 loss. In early 2009, Perić was loaned to fellow top division club Jagodina on a six-month deal.

== International career ==
Perić made five appearances for Serbia at under-21 level between 2007 and 2008.

== Career statistics ==
As of 30 March 2017

Appearances and goals by club, season and competition
Club	Season	League		National cup		League cup		Super cup		Continental		Total	
Club	Season	Apps	Goals	Apps	Goals	Apps	Goals	Apps	Goals	Apps	Goals	Apps	Goals
Kaposvár	2010–11	27	8	7	2	2	0	—		—		36	10
Kaposvár	2011–12	15	11	4	2	2	0	—		—		21	13
Videoton	2011–12	4	2	1	1	3	2	0	0	0	0	8	5
Videoton	2012–13	1	0	0	0	0	0	0	0	0	0	1	0
Ferencváros (loan)	2012–13	16	4	1	0	7	6	—		—		24	10
Pécs (loan)	2013–14	5	0	2	0	3	4	—		—		10	4
Dunaújváros (loan)	2014–15	7	2	1	0	5	1	—		—		13	3
Career total		75	27	16	5	22	13	0	0	0	0	113	45

== Honours ==
Ferencváros

- Ligakupa: 2012–13

Videoton

- Szuperkupa: 2012
