= Tiszakanyár =

Coordinates: 48°15′N 21°58′E

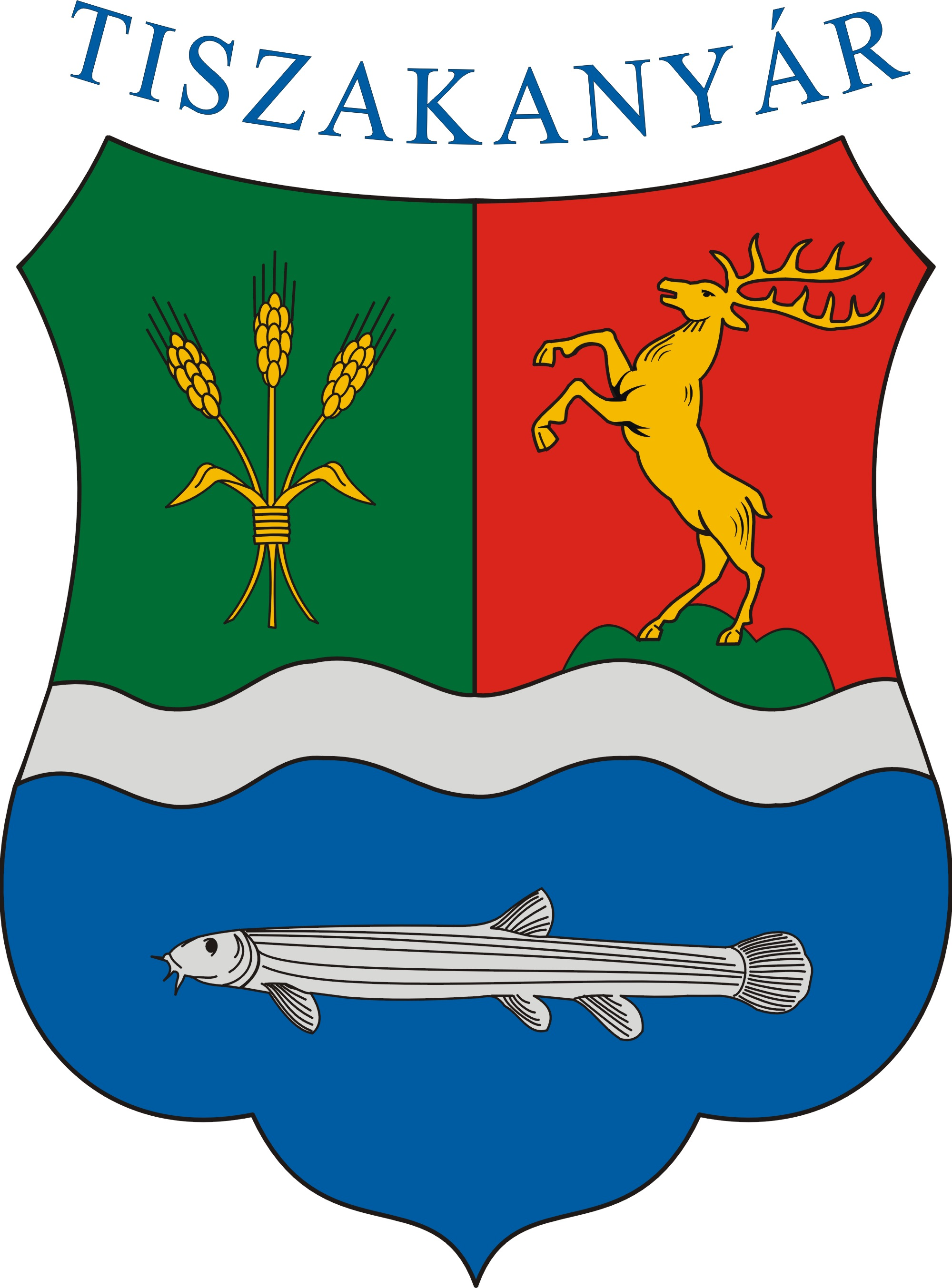
- Coat of arms
- Interactive map of Tiszakanyár
- Country: Hungary
- County: Szabolcs-Szatmár-Bereg

Area
  - Total: 15.51 km^{2} (5.99 sq mi)

Population (2015)
  - Total: 1,576
  - Density: 101.5/km^{2} (263/sq mi)
- Time zone: UTC+1 (CET)
  - Summer (DST): UTC+2 (CEST)
- Postal code: 4493
- Area code: 45
- Website: https://www.tiszakanyar.hu

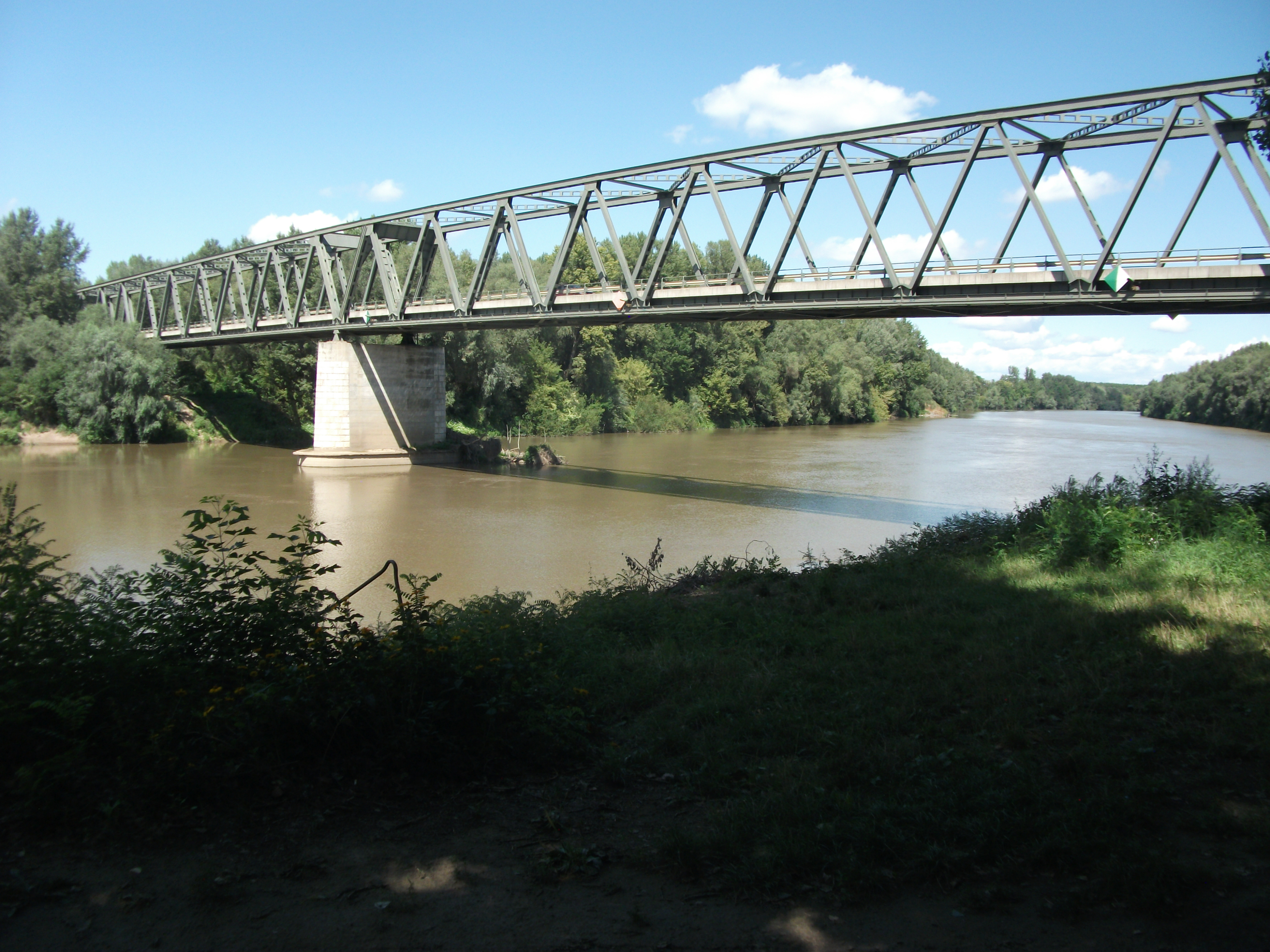
Ferenc Rakoczi II. - Tisa bridge - Tiszakanyár, Hungary

Location of Szabolcs-Szatmar-Bereg county in Hungary

Tiszakanyár is a village in Szabolcs-Szatmár-Bereg county, in the Northern Great Plain region of eastern Hungary.

== Geography ==
It covers an area of 15.51 km^{2} (6 sq mi) and has a population of 1576 people (2015).

== History ==
The name of Tiszakanyár was first mentioned in contemporary deeds in 1381, and its name was written in its present form as early as the end of the 1300s.

In 1446 the village was owned by the Bezdédy family.

In 1477, the Leszesz Convention also acquired partial estates in the settlement.

From the 16th century to the beginning of the 20th century, its larger owner was the Convent of Leess.

In 1876 there was a great flood in the village, which destroyed much of the village, but the settlement was soon rebuilt.
