= Gábor Jánvári =

Hungarian footballer

Personal information
- Date of birth: 25 April 1990 (age 36)
- Place of birth: Kisvárda, Hungary
- Height: 1.84 m (6 ft 1/2 in)
- Position: Left back

Youth career
- 2003–2004: Oros
- 2004–2007: Kisvárda

Senior career*
| Years | Team | Apps | (Gls) |
| 2007–2009 | Kisvárda | 42 | (2) |
| 2009–2011 | Tiszakanyár | 61 | (1) |
| 2011–2014 | Kaposvár | 54 | (0) |
| 2014–2015 | Nyíregyháza | 20 | (0) |
| 2015–2018 | Haladás | 23 | (0) |
| 2018–2019 | Kisvárda | 14 | (0) |
| 2019–2020 | Siófok | 30 | (2) |
| 2020–2023 | Nyíregyháza | 83 | (2) |

International career
| 2012–2013 | Hungary U21 | 1 | (0) |
- * Club domestic league appearances and goals as of 30 May 2023

Gábor Jánvári (born 25 April 1990) is a Hungarian football player.

== Career statistics ==
Appearances and goals by club, season and competition
| Club | Season | League | | | Cup | | League Cup | | Europe | | Total | |
| Club | Season | Division | Apps | Goals | Apps | Goals | Apps | Goals | Apps | Goals | Apps | Goals |
|---|---|---|---|---|---|---|---|---|---|---|---|---|
Kisvárda
| Kisvárda | 2007–08 | Nemzeti Bajnokság III | 27 | 1 | 0 | 0 | — | | — | | 27 | 1 |
| Kisvárda | 2008–09 | Nemzeti Bajnokság III | 15 | 1 | 2 | 0 | — | | — | | 17 | 1 |
| Kisvárda | Total | | 42 | 2 | 2 | 0 | — | | — | | 44 | 2 |
Tiszakanyár
| Tiszakanyár | 2008–09 | Nemzeti Bajnokság III | 14 | 0 | 0 | 0 | — | | — | | 14 | 0 |
| Tiszakanyár | 2009–10 | Nemzeti Bajnokság III | 18 | 0 | 0 | 0 | — | | — | | 18 | 0 |
| Tiszakanyár | 2010–11 | Nemzeti Bajnokság III | 29 | 1 | 4 | 1 | — | | — | | 33 | 2 |
| Tiszakanyár | Total | | 61 | 1 | 4 | 1 | — | | — | | 65 | 2 |
Kaposvár
| Kaposvár | 2011–12 | Nemzeti Bajnokság I | 22 | 0 | 5 | 0 | 6 | 0 | — | | 33 | 0 |
| Kaposvár | 2012–13 | Nemzeti Bajnokság I | 24 | 0 | 2 | 0 | 2 | 0 | — | | 28 | 0 |
| Kaposvár | 2013–14 | Nemzeti Bajnokság I | 8 | 0 | 2 | 0 | 4 | 0 | — | | 14 | 0 |
| Kaposvár | Total | | 54 | 0 | 9 | 0 | 12 | 0 | — | | 75 | 0 |
Nyíregyháza
| Nyíregyháza | 2013–14 | Nemzeti Bajnokság II | 12 | 0 | 2 | 0 | 0 | 0 | — | | 14 | 0 |
| Nyíregyháza | 2014–15 | Nemzeti Bajnokság I | 8 | 0 | 2 | 0 | 8 | 0 | — | | 18 | 0 |
| Nyíregyháza | Total | | 20 | 0 | 4 | 0 | 8 | 0 | — | | 32 | 0 |
Szombathely
| Szombathely | 2014–15 | Nemzeti Bajnokság I | 11 | 0 | 0 | 0 | 0 | 0 | — | | 11 | 0 |
| Szombathely | 2015–16 | Nemzeti Bajnokság I | 12 | 0 | 5 | 0 | — | | — | | 17 | 0 |
| Szombathely | 2017–18 | Nemzeti Bajnokság I | 0 | 0 | 2 | 0 | — | | — | | 2 | 0 |
| Szombathely | Total | | 23 | 0 | 7 | 0 | 0 | 0 | — | | 30 | 0 |
Kisvárda
| Kisvárda | 2017–18 | Nemzeti Bajnokság II | 12 | 0 | 0 | 0 | — | | — | | 12 | 0 |
| Kisvárda | 2018–19 | Nemzeti Bajnokság I | 2 | 0 | 0 | 0 | — | | — | | 2 | 0 |
| Kisvárda | Total | | 14 | 0 | 0 | 0 | 0 | 0 | — | | 14 | 0 |
| Career total | | | 214 | 3 | 26 | 1 | 20 | 0 | 0 | 0 | 260 | 4 |

Updated to games played as of 30 September 2018.
