= Petar Mudreša =

Serbian footballer

Personal information
- Full name: Petar Mudreša
- Date of birth: January 1, 1985 (age 41)
- Place of birth: Titov Vrbas, SFR Yugoslavia
- Height: 1.90 m (6 ft 3 in)
- Position: Centre-back

Senior career*
Years	Team	Apps	(Gls)
2002–2005	Vrbas	60	(4)
2005–2006	Bečej	16	(0)
2006–2007	Radnički Sombor	14	(2)
2007–2008	Mladost Apatin	18	(0)
2008–2009	Čelik Zenica	10	(0)
2009	Mladost Apatin	14	(0)
2009–2010	ČSK Čelarevo	15	(2)
2010–2011	Apolonia Fier	14	(0)
2011	Hajduk Kula	10	(0)
2011	Kaposvár Rákóczi	3	(0)
2012	Metalac Gornji Milanovac	6	(0)
2014–2015	Tápé ESK	24	(1)
2015–2016	ČSK Čelarevo	16	(1)
2016–2017	OFK Odžaci	17	(2)
2017-2022	Höttur/Huginn	75	(4)
Total		312	(16)
- * Club domestic league appearances and goals as of 12 August 2022

Petar Mudreša (Serbian Cyrillic: Петар Мудреша; born 1 January 1985) is a Serbian retired footballer.

== Club career ==
Despite never having played in the Serbian SuperLiga, he played in a number of lower leagues clubs such as two former top league clubs FK Bečej and FK Mladost Apatin, but also with FK Radnički Sombor and FK ČSK Čelarevo. Between January 2008 and January 2009, he played in a Premier League of Bosnia and Herzegovina club NK Čelik Zenica, and in January 2010 has decided to move abroad again, this time to the also neighbouring Albanian Superliga club FK Apolonia Fier. Since January 2011 he has been back in Serbia, this time playing for the first time in the top league by signing with FK Hajduk Kula. For the 2014–15 season, Mudreša was the member of Hungarian side Tápé ESK.
