= Pedro Sass =

Brazilian footballer (born 1990)

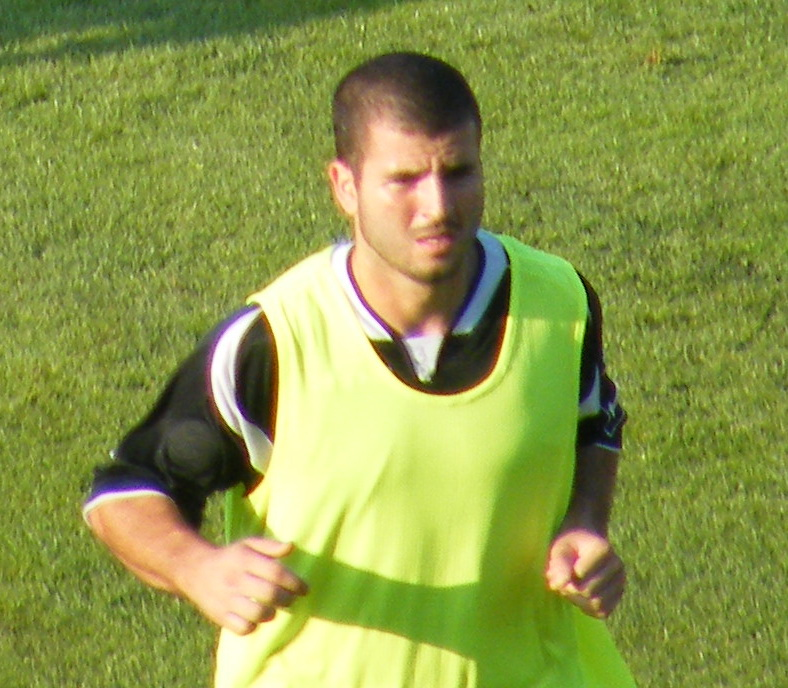

Personal information
- Full name: Pedro Sass Petrazzi
- Date of birth: 15 September 1990 (age 36)
- Place of birth: Jaboticabal, Brazil
- Height: 1.80 m (5 ft 11 in)
- Position: Midfielder

Team information
- Current team: Hapoel Nof HaGalil F.C.
- Number: 4

Youth career
- 2008–2008: Comercial – RP

Senior career*
Years	Team	Apps	(Gls)
2008–2009	Comercial – RP	0	(0)
2009–2010	Kaposvölgye VSC	13	(0)
2010–2013	Kaposvári Rákóczi	70	(1)
2013–2014	Levadiakos	21	(0)
2014	Hapoel Ra'anana	14	(0)
2015	Shakhter Karagandy	23	(0)
2016	Borac Čačak	12	(0)
2017	Hapoel Nof HaGalil	7	(0)
2018–2022	Hapoel Nof HaGalil	112	(2)
2022	Hapoel Umm al-Fahm	13	(0)
2022–2023	Hapoel Ashdod	18	(0)
2023	Dečić	13	(0)
2023–2026	F.C. Kafr Qasim	69	(0)
2026–	Hapoel Nof HaGalil F.C.	69	(0)
- * Club domestic league appearances and goals as of 24 June 2026

Pedro Sass Petrazzi (born 15 September 1990) is a Brazilian footballer who plays as a midfielder for Hapoel Nof HaGalil F.C..

== Career ==
Born in Jaboticabal, he played with Comercial FC from Ribeirão Preto back in Brazil. In 2009, he moved to Europe, to Hungary, and joined Kaposvölgye VSC. After one season he moved to Kaposvári Rákóczi FC where he will play four seasons in the Nemzeti Bajnokság I, Hungarian championship. Afterwards, he moved to Greece and played in the 2013–14 Super League Greece with Levadiakos. Next stop was Israel, he joined Hapoel Ra'anana in summer 2014. He played the first half of the 2014–15 Israeli Premier League and in the winter-break he moved to Kazakhstan where he played with Shakhter Karagandy in the 2015 Kazakhstan Premier League. Sass left Shakhter Karagandy by mutual consent on 23 September 2015. In February 2016, after successful trials, he signed with Serbian side Borac Čačak earning the shirt number 7. He was one of Borac winter-break signings as the club was having an historical season by being second placed in the 2015–16 Serbian SuperLiga winter-break and clearly aiming for a spot in European competitions next summer.

== Career statistics ==
As of match played 18 May 2016

Appearances and goals by club, season and competition
Club	Season	League			National cup		League cup		Continental		Total	
Club	Season	Division	Apps	Goals	Apps	Goals	Apps	Goals	Apps	Goals	Apps	Goals
Kaposvári Rákóczi	2010–11	Nemzeti Bajnokság I	26	1	5	0	1	0	–		32	1
Kaposvári Rákóczi	2011–12	Nemzeti Bajnokság I	17	0	0	0	3	0	–		20	0
Kaposvári Rákóczi	2012–13	Nemzeti Bajnokság I	27	0	1	0	1	0	–		29	0
Kaposvári Rákóczi	Total		70	1	6	0	5	0	0	0	81	1
Levadiakos	2013–14	Super League Greece	21	0	1	0	–		–		22	0
Hapoel Ra'anana	2014–15	Israeli Premier League	14	0	3	0	0	0	–		17	0
Shakhter Karagandy	2015	Kazakhstan Premier League	23	0	1	0	–		–		24	0
Borac Čačak	2015–16	Serbian SuperLiga	12	0	2	0	–		–		14	0
Career total			140	1	13	0	5	0	0	0	158	1
