= Olivér Kovács =

Hungarian footballer

Personal information
- Date of birth: 22 December 1990 (age 35)
- Place of birth: Marcali, Hungary
- Height: 1.85 m (6 ft 1 in)
- Position: Midfielder

Team information
- Current team: Dorog
- Number: 22

Youth career
- 2003–2006: Marcali
- 2006: Sopron
- 2006–2008: Kaposvár

Senior career*
Years	Team	Apps	(Gls)
2008–2009	Marcali VFC	24	(1)
2009–2010	Nagyatád	24	(6)
2010–2015	Kaposvár	75	(2)
2015–2017	Szolnok	45	(4)
2017–2019	Kazincbarcika	32	(0)
2019	Nagykanizsa		
2019–2022	Szolnoki MÁV	81	(5)
2022–	Dorog	12	(1)
- * Club domestic league appearances and goals as of 30 May 2023

Olivér Kovács (born 22 December 1990) is a Hungarian football player who plays for Dorog.

== Career ==
On 3 July 2022, Kovács signed with Dorog.
