= Bojan Pavlović (footballer, born 1985) =

Serbian footballer and manager

Personal information
- Full name: Bojan Pavlović
- Date of birth: February 1, 1985 (age 41)
- Place of birth: Kragujevac, SFR Yugoslavia
- Height: 1.78 m (5 ft 10 in)
- Positions: Winger; full back

Team information
- Current team: OFK Beograd (asst. manager)

Senior career*
Years	Team	Apps	(Gls)
2007–2009	Borac Čačak	49	(9)
2009–2010	Čukarički	12	(0)
2010	Metalac GM	13	(1)
2010–2013	Kaposvár	80	(7)
2014–2017	Istra 1961	44	(0)
2018	Serbian White Eagles		

Managerial career
- 2019: Xi'an Daxing Chongde
- 2020: Shanxi Longjin
- 2020-2021: Gruza
- 2022: Železničar Pančevo (asst.)
- 2023: Mladost Lučani (asst.)
- 2024-: OFK Beograd (asst.)
- * Club domestic league appearances and goals

Bojan Pavlović (Serbian Cyrillic: Бојан Павловић; born February 1, 1985) is a Serbian football manager and former player who is an assistant manager at OFK Beograd.

== Playing career ==
Pavlović played in the Serbian SuperLiga in 2007 with FK Borac Čačak. During his tenure with Borac he featured in the 2008–09 UEFA Cup against FC Dacia Chișinău, and PFC Lokomotiv Sofia. In 2009, he signed with FK Čukarički, and later played with FK Metalac Gornji Milanovac. In 2010, he played abroad in the Nemzeti Bajnokság I with Kaposvári Rákóczi FC. In 2014, he played in the Croatian First Football League for three seasons with NK Istra 1961. He later played in the Canadian Soccer League with Serbian White Eagles FC for the 2018 season.

== Managerial career ==
Pavlović began managing in 2019 with Xi'an Daxing Chongde in the China League Two.

In July 2020, Pavlović began managing China League Two team Shanxi Longjin. Pavlović joined Igor Savić's managerial staff as his assistant manager in 2022 for Železničar Pančevo.

In 2024, he joined the OFK Beograd coaching staff as an assistant coach.

=== Managerial statistics ===
As of match played 15 December 2020

Managerial record by club and tenure
Team	From	To	Record				
Team	From	To	M	W	D	L	Win %
Xi'an Daxing	7 March 2019	31 December 2019	33	5	5	23	15.15
Shanxi Longjin	1 July 2020	Present	8	0	0	8	0.00
Total			41	5	5	31	12.20
