= György Katona =

Hungarian footballer

Personal information
- Full name: György Katona
- Date of birth: 23 January 1988 (age 38)
- Place of birth: Mátészalka, Hungary
- Height: 1.71 m (5 ft 7 1/2 in)
- Position: Midfielder

Team information
- Current team: Füzesgyarmat

Youth career
- 2002–2007: Nyíregyháza

Senior career*
Years	Team	Apps	(Gls)
2007–2010	Nyírmada SE	80	(19)
2010–2011	Nagyecsed SE	30	(12)
2011–2013	Kaposvár	4	(0)
2013–2014	Nyíregyháza	13	(1)
2014–2017	Cigánd SE	34	(8)
2017–2018	Szolnok	13	(2)
2018–2019	Nyírbátor		
2019–	Füzesgyarmat		
- * Club domestic league appearances and goals as of 00:08, 5 November 2019 (UTC)

György Katona (born 23 January 1988) is a Hungarian football player who currently plays for Füzesgyarmati SK.
