= Dávid Hegedűs =

Hungarian footballer

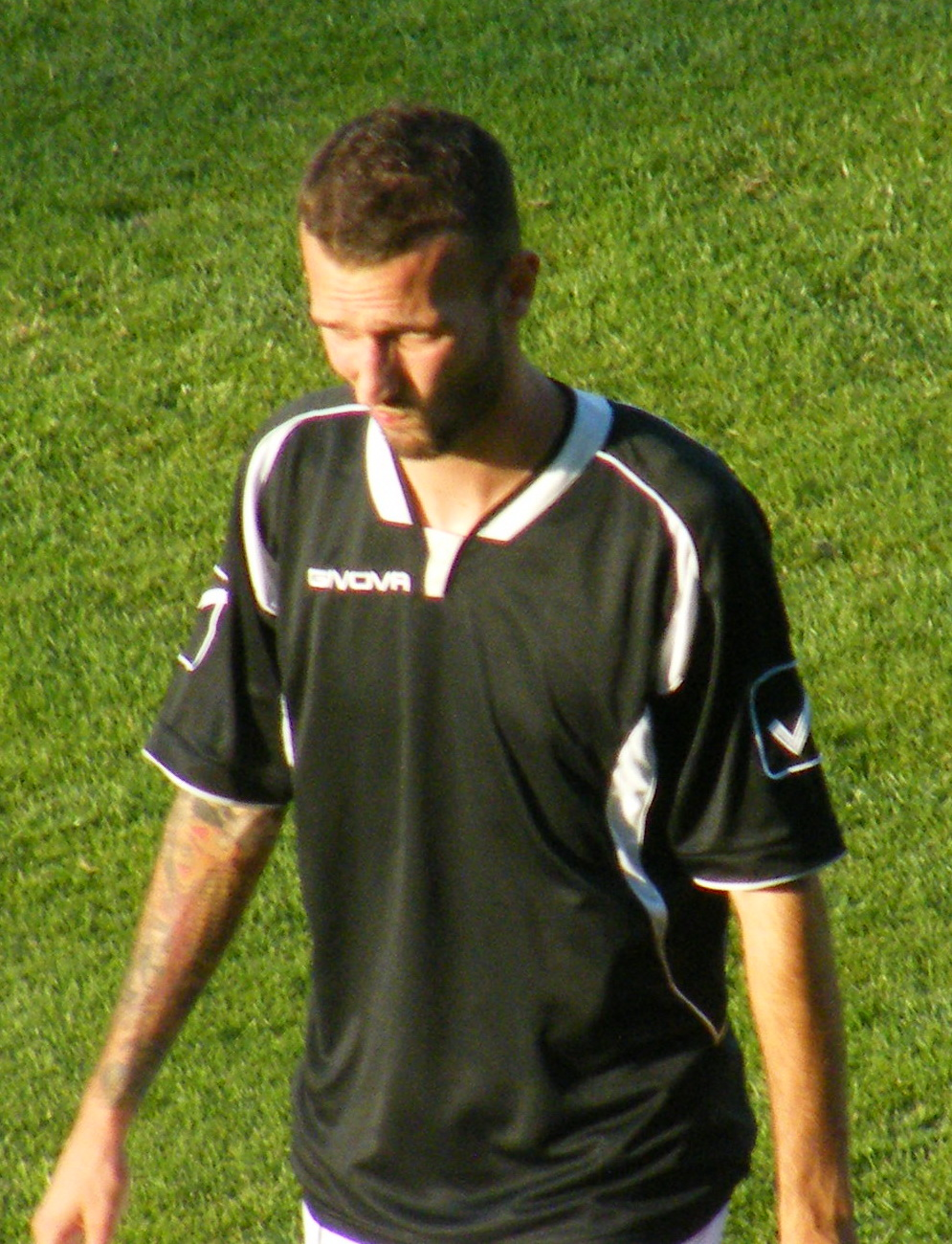

Personal information
- Date of birth: 6 June 1985 (age 41)
- Place of birth: Eger, Hungary
- Height: 1.84 m (6 ft 1/2 in)
- Position: Defensive midfielder

Team information
- Current team: Eger

Youth career
- 2002–2003: Marcali
- 2003–2004: Verpelét
- 2004–2005: Pétervására

Senior career*
Years	Team	Apps	(Gls)
2005–2006	Jászapáti VSE	26	(7)
2006–2007	Bőcs	15	(0)
2007–2008	Kazincbarcika	12	(0)
2007	→ Eger (loan)	25	(2)
2008–2010	Szolnok	10	(1)
2009	→ Kaposvár (loan)	20	(0)
2010	→ Hevesi LSC (loan)	13	(1)
2010–2013	Kaposvár	68	(3)
2013–2017	Mezőkövesd	76	(3)
2017–2018	Kazincbarcika	32	(1)
2018–2020	Kaposvár	43	(4)
2020–	Eger	56	(5)
- * Club domestic league appearances and goals as of 4 May 2022

Dávid Hegedűs (born 6 June 1985) is a Hungarian football player who plays for Eger.

== Career statistics ==
Appearances and goals by club, season and competition
Club	Season	League			Cup		League Cup		Europe		Total	
Club	Season	Division	Apps	Goals	Apps	Goals	Apps	Goals	Apps	Goals	Apps	Goals
Jászapáti	2005–06	Nemzeti Bajnokság II	26	7	2	0	—		—		28	7
Bőcs	2006–07	Nemzeti Bajnokság II	15	0	0	0	—		—		15	0
Kazincbarcika
Kazincbarcika	2006–07	Nemzeti Bajnokság II	12	0	0	0	—		—		12	0
Kazincbarcika	2017–18	Nemzeti Bajnokság II	32	1	0	0	—		—		32	1
Kazincbarcika	Total		44	1	0	0	0	0	0	0	44	1
Eger	2007–08	Nemzeti Bajnokság III	25	2	1	2	—		—		26	4
Szolnok	2008–09	Nemzeti Bajnokság II	10	1	1	0	—		—		11	1
Heves	2009–10	Nemzeti Bajnokság III	13	1	2	0	—		—		15	1
Mezőkövesd
Mezőkövesd	2013–14	Nemzeti Bajnokság I	28	0	2	0	4	0	—		34	0
Mezőkövesd	2014–15	Nemzeti Bajnokság II	17	1	2	1	3	0	—		22	2
Mezőkövesd	2015–16	Nemzeti Bajnokság II	23	2	1	0	—		—		24	2
Mezőkövesd	2016–17	Nemzeti Bajnokság I	8	0	4	0	—		—		12	0
Mezőkövesd	Total		76	3	9	1	7	0	0	0	92	4
Kaposvár
Kaposvár	2008–09	Nemzeti Bajnokság I	14	0	0	0	1	0	—		15	0
Kaposvár	2009–10	Nemzeti Bajnokság I	6	0	3	0	5	0	—		14	0
Kaposvár	2010–11	Nemzeti Bajnokság I	24	2	5	0	1	0	—		30	2
Kaposvár	2011–12	Nemzeti Bajnokság I	25	0	3	0	3	0	—		31	0
Kaposvár	2012–13	Nemzeti Bajnokság I	19	1	1	0	1	0	—		21	1
Kaposvár	2018–19	Nemzeti Bajnokság II	23	2	0	0	—		—		23	2
Kaposvár	2019–20	Nemzeti Bajnokság I	20	2	0	0	—		—		20	2
Kaposvár	Total		131	7	12	0	11	0	—		154	7
Career total			340	22	27	3	18	0	0	0	385	25

Updated to games played as of 17 June 2020.
