= Boris Gujić =

Bosnian-Herzegovinian footballer (born 1986)

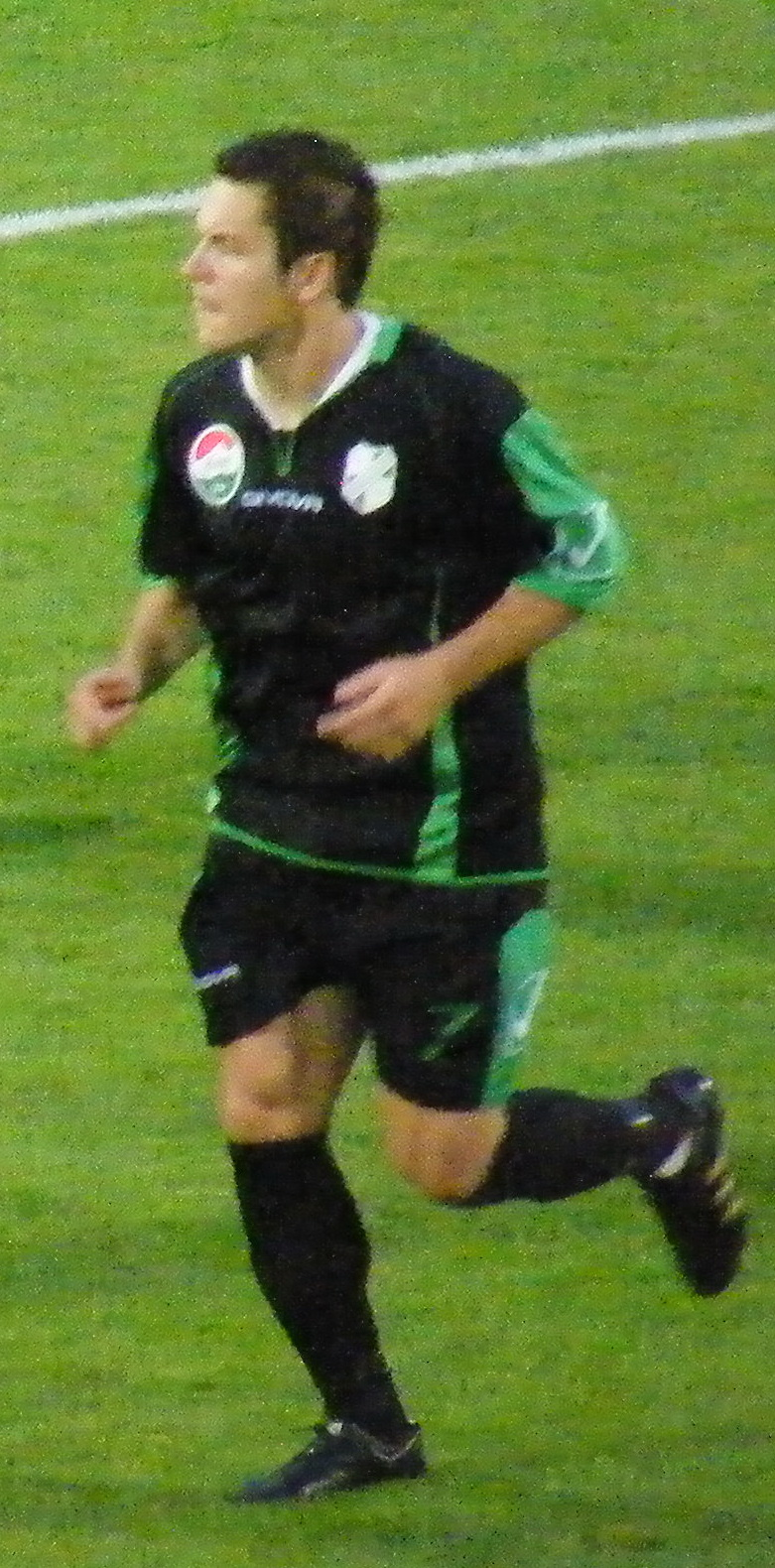

Personal information
- Full name: Boris Gujić
- Date of birth: July 9, 1986 (age 40)
- Place of birth: Zenica, SR Bosnia and Herzegovina, Yugoslavia
- Height: 1.74 m (5 ft 8 1/2 in)
- Position: Midfielder

Senior career*
| Years | Team | Apps | (Gls) |
| 2002–2006 | Bratstvo Bratunac | 75 | (38) |
| 2006–2008 | Senta | 54 | (26) |
| 2008–2012 | Kaposvár Rákóczi | 105 | (3) |
| 2012 | FK Sarajevo | 9 | (0) |
| 2013 | Senta | 12 | (4) |
| 2013 | Mladost V.O. | 13 | (1) |
- * Club domestic league appearances and goals as of 16 October 2013

Boris Gujić (Serbian Cyrillic: Борис Гујић, born 9 July 1986) is a Bosnian footballer who plays for Las Vegas Legends professional team in Major Arena Soccer League in USA.

== Club career ==
Born in Zenica, SR Bosnia and Herzegovina, SFR Yugoslavia, he started his career at FK Bratstvo from Bratunac. In 2006, he joined Serbian side FK Senta, and between 2006 and 2008 he played for FK Senta tier. In 2008, he moved to Hungary where he played the following 4 seasons in the Nemzeti Bajnokság I with Kaposvári Rákóczi FC. In summer 2012 he returned to Bosnia and Herzegovina and joined Premier League side FK Sarajevo. However, during the winter break of the 2012–13 season, he returned to Serbia to his former club FK Senta now playing in the Serbian third level, the Serbian League Vojvodina. In summer 2013 he joined newly promoted Bosnian Premier League side FK Mladost Velika Obarska. From Avgust 2014 Boris is playing in Major Arena Soccer League in USA for Las Vegas Legends from Las Vegas. He was also part of Serbia national team, which participated in Indoor Soccer World Cup played 2015 in USA.
