= Serghei Alexeev =

Moldovan footballer

Personal information
- Full name: Serghei Alexeev
- Date of birth: 31 May 1986 (age 40)
- Place of birth: Tiraspol, Moldavian SSR, Soviet Union
- Height: 1.91 m (6 ft 3 in)
- Position: Forward

Youth career
- Sheriff Tiraspol

Senior career*
Years	Team	Apps	(Gls)
2002–2004	Sheriff Tiraspol	71	(19)
2005–2006	→ Tiraspol (loan)	27	(8)
2008–2009	→ Tiraspol (loan)	21	(5)
2009	→ Iskra-Stali Rîbnița (loan)	8	(0)
2009	Aarau	6	(0)
2010	Zakarpattia Uzhhorod	13	(1)
2011–2012	Kaposvári Rákóczi	11	(0)
2012	→ Maccabi Netanya (loan)	10	(1)
2012–2013	Yenisey Krasnoyarsk	24	(3)
2013–2014	Veris Chișinău	19	(6)
2014	Zimbru Chișinău	9	(1)
2015	Tiraspol	11	(3)
2015	SKA-Energiya Khabarovsk	6	(0)
2016	Dinamo-Auto Tiraspol	6	(0)
2016–2017	Daugavpils	7	(1)
2018	Sfântul Gheorghe Suruceni	8	(2)
2018	Zaria Bălți	10	(0)
2019	Petrocub Hîncești	1	(0)
2019	Zaria Bălți	0	(0)
Total		268	(50)

International career
2004–2008	Moldova U21	?	(?)
2007–2014	Moldova	27	(6)
- * Club domestic league appearances and goals as of 29 November 2015

Serghei Alexeev (born 31 May 1986) is a Moldovan footballer who plays as a forward. He also holds Russian citizenship as Sergei Viktorovich Alekseyev (Russian: Сергей Викторович Алексеев).

== Career ==
On 3 March 2009, Norwegian champions Stabæk announced that Alexeev would attend a week-long trial with the club.

On 25 June 2009 he signed with Swiss team FC Aarau on a three-year contract. He signed at Kaposvári Rákóczi FC in summer 2011. During the 2012–13 season, he was released from Kaposvári Rákóczi FC and signed with Yenisey.

On 31 January 2012, he signed at Maccabi Netanya.

== International ==
Alexeev has played 25 times for Moldova, scoring five goals.

== International goals ==
Scores and results list Moldova's goal tally first.

#	Date	Venue	Opponent	Result	Competition	Scored
1	17 November 2007	Zimbru Stadium, Chişinău	Hungary	3–0	UEFA Euro 2008 qualifying	1
2	28 May 2008	Sheriff Stadium, Tiraspol	Armenia	2–2	Friendly	1
3	6 September 2008	Sheriff Stadium, Tiraspol	Latvia	1–2	2010 FIFA World Cup qualification	1
4	2 September 2011	Olympic Stadium, Helsinki	Finland	1–4	UEFA Euro 2012 qualifying	1
5	24 May 2014	La Jerez, Jerez	Saudi Arabia	4–0	Friendly	1

== Career statistics ==
=== Club ===
As of 1 August 2014

			League		Cup		Europe		Total	
Season	Club	League	Apps	Goals	Apps	Goals	Apps	Goals	Apps	Goals
2002–03	Sheriff Tiraspol	Divizia Națională	1	0	?	?	-	-	1	0
2003–04	Sheriff Tiraspol	Divizia Națională	9	0	4	4	-	-	13	4
2004–05	Sheriff Tiraspol	Divizia Națională	5	0	-	-	-	-	5	0
2004–05	FC Tiraspol	Divizia Națională	13	3	-	-	-	-	13	3
2005–06	FC Tiraspol	Divizia Națională	24	11	6	5	-	-	30	16
2006–07	FC Tiraspol	Divizia Națională	21	6	3	1	-	-	24	7
2006–07	Sheriff Tiraspol	Divizia Națională	11	7	-	-	-	-	11	7
2007–08	Sheriff Tiraspol	Divizia Națională	21	10	5	1	-	-	26	11
2008–09	Sheriff Tiraspol	Divizia Națională	14	4	1	0	4	1	19	5
2009-10	FC Aarau	Swiss Super League	6	0	0	0	0	0	6	0
2009–10	Zakarpattia Uzhhorod	Ukrainian Premier League	12	1	0	0	0	0	12	1
2010–11	Zakarpattia Uzhhorod	Ukrainian Premier League	1	0	1	0	0	0	2	0
2011–12	Kaposvári Rákóczi	Nemzeti Bajnokság I	11	0	2	0	0	0	13	0
2011–12	Maccabi Netanya	Israeli Premier League	11	1	3	0	0	0	14	1
2012–13	Yenisey Krasnoyarsk	Russian First Division	24	3	1	0	0	0	25	3
2013–14	FC Veris	Divizia Națională	19	6	1	0	0	0	20	6
2014–15	Zimbru Chișinău	Divizia Națională	0	0	0	0	3	2	3	2
Total			207	52	27	11	7	3	237	66

== Honours ==
Sheriff Tiraspol

- Divizia Naţională: 2006/07, 2007/08
- Cupa Moldovei: 2007–08
- Moldovan Supercup: 2004, 2007
- CIS Cup: 2009
