= Aaron Dankwah =

Ghanaian footballer (born 1993)

Personal information
- Full name: Aaron Addo Dankwah
- Date of birth: 6 January 1993 (age 33)
- Place of birth: Accra, Ghana
- Position: Midfielder

Youth career
- 2010–2012: Team Ticino U-21

Senior career*
Years	Team	Apps	(Gls)
2012–2013	Lugano	0	(0)
2012	→ Kaposvár (loan)	12	(0)
2013–2014	Kaposvár	22	(0)
2015	Újpest	7	(0)
- * Club domestic league appearances and goals as of 1 June 2014

Aaron Addo Dankwah (born 6 January 1993) is a Ghanaian footballer who plays as a midfielder.

== Career ==
Addo played for Swiss side Lugano, in their academy team Team Ticino U-21, before joining Kaposvár on loan in February 2012. He returned in May 2012 to Lugano and was then released in December 2012. After his release by the Swiss club of Lugano returned on permanent basis to Kaposvár. He played in twelve months 18 games for Kaposvár in the Nemzeti Bajnokság, before the club resigned his contract
