= Haruna Jammeh =

Gambian footballer (born 1991)

Personal information
- Full name: Haruna Rone Jammeh
- Date of birth: 2 June 1991 (age 35)
- Place of birth: Bakau, Gambia
- Height: 1.90 m (6 ft 3 in)
- Positions: Forward; midfielder

Team information
- Current team: Szeged II

Youth career
- –2006: Samger FC

Senior career*
Years	Team	Apps	(Gls)
2007–2009	Samger	18	(7)
2009–2011	Honvéd II	26	(3)
2011–2014	Kaposvár	53	(4)
2012–2013	→ Kaposvár II	6	(4)
2014	Pápa	0	(0)
2015–2016	Koprivnica		
2016–2017	Balatoni Vasas SE		
2017–2021	Tamási 2009 FC		
2021–2023	Szeged	66	(11)
2023–	Szeged II	2	(0)

International career
2010	Gambia U20		
- * Club domestic league appearances and goals as of 3 September 2023

Haruna Rone Jammeh (born 2 June 1991) is a Gambian footballer who plays as a striker for Hungarian club Szeged II.

== Career ==
Jammeh started his career with Samger FC. In the summer of 2009, he left Gambia and started his European career in Hungary, in the reserve team of Budapest Honvéd FC and played for them in 26 Nemzeti Bajnokság II games and scored three goals. After two years, he left the club and signed with Labdarúgó NB II side Kaposvári Rákóczi FC.

On 15 August 2014, Haruna signed with Pápa on a contract until 31 July 2015.
