= Moustapha Diallo (footballer, born 1992) =

Guinean footballer

Personal information
- Date of birth: 16 May 1992 (age 34)
- Place of birth: Conakry, Guinea
- Height: 1.92 m (6 ft 4 in)
- Position: Forward

Team information
- Current team: USG Carotenuto

Senior career*
Years	Team	Apps	(Gls)
2010–2011	Budapest Honvéd II	15	(2)
2011–2013	Kaposvár II	22	(3)
2011–2013	Kaposvár	20	(2)
2014	APS Zakynthos	1	(0)
2014–2015	Cicciano Calcio	15	(33)
2015–2016	Aversa Normanna	31	(7)
2016–2017	ASD Troina		
2018	Afro Napoli United		
2019–	USG Carotenuto		
- * Club domestic league appearances and goals

Moustapha Diallo (born 16 May 1992) is a Guinean footballer who plays as a forward for Italian club USG Carotenuto.

== Career ==
=== Italy ===
Diallo arrived to Italy in the summer 2014. He had some problems with his residence permit and therefore, ended up joining ASD Cicciano Calcio, where he scored 33 goals in 15 games.

In July 2018, Diallo joined Italian club Afro Napoli United. However, on 1 December 2018, the club announced that Diallo had left the club again. On 12 August 2019, Diallo joined USG Carotenuto.
