= Tamás Horváth (footballer, born 1991) =

Hungarian footballer (1991–2026)

Personal information
- Date of birth: 29 April 1991
- Place of birth: Kaposvár, Hungary
- Date of death: June 2026 (aged 35)
- Height: 1.86 m (6 ft 1 in)
- Position: Midfielder

Youth career
- 2005–2010: Kaposvári Rákóczi

Senior career*
Years	Team	Apps	(Gls)
2010–2013	Kaposvári Rákóczi	31	(1)
- * Club domestic league appearances and goals

Tamás Horváth (29 April 1991 – June 2026) was a Hungarian footballer who played as a midfielder professionally from 2010 to 2013 for Kaposvári Rákóczi, making 31 appearances, and scoring one goal. He died in June 2026, at the age of 35.

== Career statistics ==
Appearances and goals by club, season and competition
Club	Season	League			National cup		League cup		Europe		Total	
Club	Season	Division	Apps	Goals	Apps	Goals	Apps	Goals	Apps	Goals	Apps	Goals
Kaposvár	2009–10	Nemzeti Bajnokság I	2	0	0	0	0	0	0	0	2	0
Kaposvár	2010–11	Nemzeti Bajnokság I	0	0	0	0	2	0	0	0	2	0
Kaposvár	2011–12	Nemzeti Bajnokság I	12	0	7	2	1	0	0	0	20	2
Kaposvár	2012–13	Nemzeti Bajnokság I	17	1	0	0	1	0	0	0	18	1
Career total			31	1	7	2	4	0	0	0	42	3
