= Tomáš Sedlák =

Slovak footballer

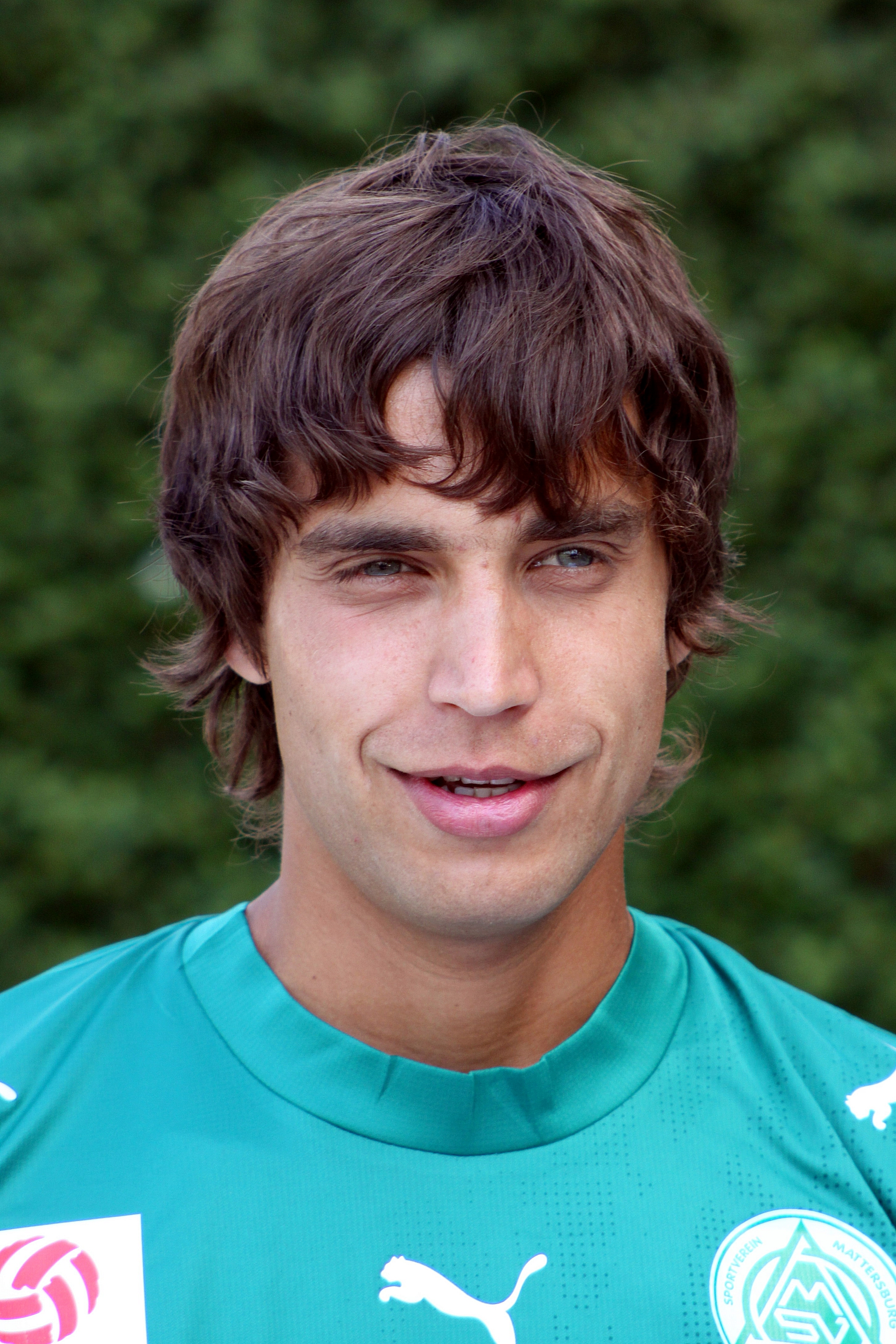

Personal information
- Full name: Tomáš Sedlák
- Date of birth: 3 February 1983 (age 43)
- Place of birth: Poprad, Czechoslovakia
- Height: 1.78 m (5 ft 10 in)
- Position: Defensive midfielder

Team information
- Current team: Prešov
- Number: 8

Youth career
- FC Tatran Poprad-Veľká
- 1998–2002: → Svit (loan)
- 2002–2003: Ružomberok

Senior career*
Years	Team	Apps	(Gls)
2004–2007	Ružomberok	52	(1)
2007–2008	Gaziantepspor	22	(0)
2009	Ružomberok	15	(1)
2009–2010	Mattersburg	5	(0)
2010–2012	Ružomberok	8	(0)
2012	Kaposvár	4	(0)
2012–2017	Zemplín Michalovce	85	(0)
2014–2015	→ Poprad (loan)	25	(3)
2017–	Tatran Prešov	22	(0)
- * Club domestic league appearances and goals as of 14 June 2018

Tomáš Sedlák (born 3 February 1983) is a Slovak professional footballer who currently plays for 1. FC Tatran Prešov in the Fortuna Liga.
