= List of Hungarian football transfers summer 2010 =

This is a list of Hungarian football transfers for the 2010 summer transfer window by club. Only transfers of clubs in the Soproni Liga and Hungarian National Championship II are included.

The summer transfer window opened on 1 June 2010, although a few transfers may have taken place prior to that date. The window closed at midnight on 31 August 2010. Players without a club may join one at any time, either during or in between transfer windows.

== Soproni Liga ==
=== Budapest Honvéd FC ===
In: Note: Flags indicate national team as defined under FIFA eligibility rules; some limited exceptions apply. Players may hold more than one non-FIFA nationality.

No.	Pos.	Nation	Player
3	DF	CMR	Sadjo Haman (from (Hungary) Diósgyőri VTK)
9	FW	HUN	Bálint Bajner (from (Romania) Liberty Salonta)
11	FW	ESP	Rufino (from (Spain) CD Toledo)
13	MF	BIH	Jovica Stokić (from (Bosnia and Herzegovina) FK Modriča)
19	FW	BRA	Danilo de Oliveira (from (Slovakia) FC Spartak Trnava)
21	FW	SLE	Alfi Conteh-Lacalle (from (Hungary) Nyíregyháza Spartacus)
23	FW	MAR	Karim Rouani (from (Portugal) GD Chaves)
––	DF	ITA	Andre Luis de Souza (from (Malta) Nadur Youngsters F.C.)

Out: Note: Flags indicate national team as defined under FIFA eligibility rules; some limited exceptions apply. Players may hold more than one non-FIFA nationality.

No.	Pos.	Nation	Player
3	FW	HUN	Norbert Palásthy (to (Hungary) Paksi SE)
5	DF	UKR	Pavlo Yanchuk (loan return to (Romania) Liberty Salonta)
9	MF	SVK	Viliam Macko (to (Slovakia) 1. FC Tatran Prešov)
11	FW	HUN	Róbert Zsolnai (on loan to (Hungary) Kaposvári Rákóczi FC)
13	DF	HUN	Zoltán Nagy (loan return to (Hungary) Debreceni VSC)
18	FW	CIV	Guie Abraham (to (France) Tours FC)
19	MF	BRA	Diego (to (France) Tours FC)
21	DF	HUN	Gergő Gohér (loan return to (Hungary) Diósgyőri VTK)
23	FW	ITA	Angelo Vaccaro (to (Italy) Sorrento Calcio)
55	MF	SRB	Dragan Vukmir (to (Hungary) MTK Budapest FC)

=== Debreceni VSC ===
In: Note: Flags indicate national team as defined under FIFA eligibility rules; some limited exceptions apply. Players may hold more than one non-FIFA nationality.

No.	Pos.	Nation	Player
2	DF	HUN	István Szűcs (loan return from (Hungary) Kecskeméti TE)
4	DF	GER	Dajan Simac (from (Germany) FSV Frankfurt)
10	FW	HUN	Balázs Farkas (from (Ukraine) Dynamo Kyiv)
11	FW	HUN	Péter Kabát (from (Hungary) Újpest FC)
28	DF	HUN	Zoltán Nagy (loan return from (Hungary) Budapest Honvéd FC)
31	GK	LTU	Mindaugas Malinauskas (from (Hungary) Diósgyőri VTK)
32	MF	SRB	Predrag Pavlović (from (Serbia) FK Napredak Kruševac)
70	MF	HUN	Tamás Kulcsár (from (Poland) Polonia Warsaw)
88	MF	HUN	Tamás Huszák (loan return from (Hungary) Diósgyőri VTK)
91	FW	HUN	Ádám Balajti (from (Hungary) Diósgyőri VTK)
—	MF	HUN	Tamás Szélpál (loan return from (Hungary) Szolnoki MÁV FC)

Out: Note: Flags indicate national team as defined under FIFA eligibility rules; some limited exceptions apply. Players may hold more than one non-FIFA nationality.

No.	Pos.	Nation	Player
4	MF	HUN	Dávid Mohl (to (Hungary) Kecskeméti TE)
11	FW	HUN	Róbert Feczesin (loan return to (Italy) Brescia Calcio)
13	DF	HUN	Péter Bíró (to (Hungary) Lombard-Pápa TFC)
14	FW	HUN	Gergely Rudolf (to (Italy) Genoa C.F.C.)
25	DF	HUN	Zoltán Szélesi (to (Greece) Olympiacos Volos)
46	FW	CMR	Etogo Essama (on loan to (Hungary) Bőcs KSC)
60	MF	SVK	Károly Czanik (to (Hungary) Gyirmót SE)
81	MF	HUN	Attila Katona (on loan to (Hungary) Bőcs KSC)

=== Ferencvárosi TC ===
In: Note: Flags indicate national team as defined under FIFA eligibility rules; some limited exceptions apply. Players may hold more than one non-FIFA nationality.

No.	Pos.	Nation	Player
1	GK	SVN	Marko Ranilović (from (Slovenia) NK Maribor)
8	MF	HUN	György Józsi (from (Hungary) Győri ETO FC)
10	MF	BRA	Andrezinho (from (Brazil) Grêmio EC)
11	MF	HUN	Patrik Nagy (on loan from (Austria) SK Rapid Wien)
12	GK	HUN	Tamás Mester (from (Hungary) Kozármisleny SE)
13	DF	BRA	Junior (from (Hungary) Kaposvári Rákóczi FC)
14	MF	SRB	Srđan Stanić (from (Hungary) Kaposvári Rákóczi FC)
18	FW	CZE	Marek Heinz (from (Austria) Kapfenberger SV)
22	DF	HUN	István Rodenbücher (from (Hungary) MTK Budapest)
25	MF	HUN	Bela Maróti (from (Hungary) Kaposvári Rákóczi FC)
36	FW	CAN	Igor Pisanjuk (from (Hungary) Szolnoki MÁV FC)
—	DF	BRA	Adriano (from (Brazil) Goiás EC)
—	MF	HUN	István Makai (on loan from (Hungary) Nyíregyháza)

Out: Note: Flags indicate national team as defined under FIFA eligibility rules; some limited exceptions apply. Players may hold more than one non-FIFA nationality.

No.	Pos.	Nation	Player
3	DF	ESP	Joaquín Martínez (to (Spain) Ponteverda CF)
5	DF	ESP	Carlos Alcántara (to (Spain) Alicante CF)
6	MF	HUN	Péter Lipcsei (retired)
7	MF	PAK	Adnan Ahmed (to (Iran) F.C. Aboomoslem)
9	FW	ENG	Anthony Elding (to (England) Rochdale AFC)
10	FW	ENG	Paul Shaw (to (England) Retford United)
13	FW	HUN	István Ferenczi (to (Hungary) Vasas SC)
14	MF	NIR	Tommy Doherty (to (England) Bradford City F.C.)
25	FW	JAM	Jason Morrison (to (Norway) Strømsgodset IF)
33	FW	SRB	Bojan Mamić (to (Serbia) FK Mladi Radnik)
39	DF	JAM	Rafe Wolfe (to (Jamaica) Portmore United)
42	GK	HUN	Balázs Megyeri (to (Greece) Olympiacos)

=== Győri ETO FC ===
In: Note: Flags indicate national team as defined under FIFA eligibility rules; some limited exceptions apply. Players may hold more than one non-FIFA nationality.

No.	Pos.	Nation	Player
11	FW	MNE	Bojan Brnović (loan return from (Hungary) Diósgyőr)
12	MF	SRB	Nikola Trajković (from (Serbia) FK Čukarički)
13	MF	HUN	Dávid Pákolicz (loan return from (Hungary) Nyírség-Sp.)
14	MF	HUN	Dániel Völgyi (loan return from (Hungary) Paksi SE)
15	FW	HUN	Bence Zámbó (loan return from (Hungary) Diósgyőr)
19	FW	HUN	Péter Bajzát (loan return from (Hungary) Diósgyőr)
19	FW	ALG	Fouad Bouguerra (from (Hungary) Nyíregyháza)
26	DF	BIH	Zoran Šupić (loan return from (Hungary) Diósgyőr)
—	MF	MNE	Đorđije Ćetković (from (Israel) Bnei Sakhnin F.C.)
—	MF	BRA	Ji-Paraná (from (Brazil) SC Internacional)

Out: Note: Flags indicate national team as defined under FIFA eligibility rules; some limited exceptions apply. Players may hold more than one non-FIFA nationality.

No.	Pos.	Nation	Player
7	FW	BIH	Eldin Adilović (released)
8	MF	HUN	György Józsi (to (Hungary) Ferencvárosi TC)
11	FW	MNE	Bojan Brnović (released)
12	MF	SVK	Mário Bicák (to (Slovakia) FC Spartak Trnava)
13	MF	HUN	Dávid Pákolicz (to (Hungary) Nyíregyháza Spartacus)
14	FW	GEO	Vakhtang Pantskhava (to (Hungary) Vasas SC)
15	FW	HUN	Bence Zámbó (on loan to (Hungary) MTK Budapest FC)
16	FW	EST	Tarmo Kink (to (England) Middlesbrough FC)
21	MF	HUN	Ádám Dudás (on loan to (Hungary) Paksi SE)
26	DF	BIH	Zoran Šupić (on loan to (Hungary) Lombard-Pápa TFC)
31	GK	SVK	Péter Molnár (on loan to (Hungary) BFC Siófok)
32	DF	MAR	Chemcedine El Araichi (to (Belgium) K.V. Kortrijk)
—	DF	SRB	Bojan Neziri (released)
—	MF	GEO	Daviti Lortkiphanidze (released)

=== Kaposvári Rákóczi FC ===
In: Note: Flags indicate national team as defined under FIFA eligibility rules; some limited exceptions apply. Players may hold more than one non-FIFA nationality.

No.	Pos.	Nation	Player
—	DF	SRB	Dražen Okuka (from (Serbia) FK Čukarički Stankom)
—	MF	SRB	Bojan Pavlović (from (Serbia) FK Čukarički Stankom)
—	DF	SVK	Mátyás Lelkes (from (Slovakia) DAC Dunajská Streda)
—	MF	MAR	Daniane Jawad (from (Italy) A.S.D. Mezzolara)
—	DF	HUN	Dávid Hegedűs (from (Hungary) Eger FC)
—	DF	HUN	József Zsók (from (Hungary) Bajai LSE)
—	FW	SRB	Milan Perić (from (Serbia) Metalac G.M.)
—	MF	HUN	Norbert Lipusz (from (Hungary) Diósgyőri VTK)
—	MF	BRA	Pedro (from (Hungary) Kaposvölgye VSC)
—	GK	HUN	József Strublics (on loan from (Hungary) Kaposvölgye)
—	FW	HUN	Róbert Zsolnai (on loan from (Hungary) Bp. Honvéd)

Out: Note: Flags indicate national team as defined under FIFA eligibility rules; some limited exceptions apply. Players may hold more than one non-FIFA nationality.

No.	Pos.	Nation	Player
3	DF	ITA	Gabriele Fabris (released)
11	FW	BIH	Daniel Culum (released)
13	DF	BRA	Júnior (to (Hungary) Ferencvárosi TC)
15	MF	SRB	Dragan Antanasijević (released)
19	MF	HUN	Krisztián Pest (released)
23	GK	HUN	László Horváth (on loan to (Hungary) Kaposvölgye)
25	MF	HUN	Gábor Bogdán (released)
27	MF	HUN	Bela Maróti (to (Hungary) Ferencvárosi TC)
30	MF	SRB	Srđan Stanić (to (Hungary) Ferencvárosi TC)
—	DF	SRB	Slobodan Markovic (released)
—	DF	HUN	István Kerekes (to (Hungary) Orosháza FC)
—	DF	HUN	László Pintér (on loan to (Hungary) Kaposvölgye VSC)

=== Kecskeméti TE ===
In: Note: Flags indicate national team as defined under FIFA eligibility rules; some limited exceptions apply. Players may hold more than one non-FIFA nationality.

No.	Pos.	Nation	Player
18	FW	CGO	Francis Litsingi (from (Hungary) Újpest FC)
—	FW	HUN	Attila Tököli (from (Hungary) Paksi SE)
—	GK	SVK	Ladislav Rybánsky (from (Slovakia) FC Spartak Trnava)
—	GK	HUN	Zoltán Tóth (loan return from (Hungary) Békéscsaba)
—	FW	CTA	Foxi Kethevoama (from (Hungary) Újpest FC)
—	FW	CIV	Sindou Dosso (from (Hungary) Nyíregyháza Spartacus)
—	MF	CMR	Christian Ebala (from (Hungary) Kazincbarcikai SC)
—	MF	HUN	Electo Wilson (from (Hungary) Újpest FC)
—	MF	HUN	Gábor Bori (from (Hungary) MTK Budapest FC)

Out: Note: Flags indicate national team as defined under FIFA eligibility rules; some limited exceptions apply. Players may hold more than one non-FIFA nationality.

No.	Pos.	Nation	Player
3	DF	BRA	Robson de Souza (released)
4	DF	HUN	István Szűcs (loan return to (Hungary) Debreceni VSC)
6	DF	BIH	Dalio Memić (released)
7	FW	HUN	Tibor Montvai (to (Hungary) Paksi SE)
9	FW	NGA	MacPherlin Dudu Omagbemi (Free agent)
16	DF	SVN	Aleš Kokot (released)
20	MF	HUN	Péter Vörös (to (Hungary) Szolnoki MÁV FC)
36	DF	HUN	Szabolcs Schindler (to (Hungary) Szolnoki MÁV FC)
—	MF	SVN	Uroš Veselič (released)

=== Lombard-Pápa TFC ===
In: Note: Flags indicate national team as defined under FIFA eligibility rules; some limited exceptions apply. Players may hold more than one non-FIFA nationality.

No.	Pos.	Nation	Player
—	FW	HUN	Tamás German (loan return from (Netherlands) Emmen)
—	MF	HUN	Norbert Tóth (from (Hungary) Újpest FC)
—	MF	HUN	Péter Takács (from (Hungary) Diósgyőri VTK)
—	DF	SRB	Zoran Šupić (on loan from (Hungary) Győri ETO FC)
—	DF	HUN	Péter Bíró (from (Hungary) Debreceni VSC)
—	DF	HUN	Attila Császár (loan return from (Hungary) Ajka FC)

Out: Note: Flags indicate national team as defined under FIFA eligibility rules; some limited exceptions apply. Players may hold more than one non-FIFA nationality.

No.	Pos.	Nation	Player
7	MF	HUN	Balázs Sarus (released)
16	DF	HUN	Attila Császár (released)
26	DF	HUN	Tamás Sipos (to (Hungary) Bőcs KSC)

=== MTK Budapest FC ===
In: Note: Flags indicate national team as defined under FIFA eligibility rules; some limited exceptions apply. Players may hold more than one non-FIFA nationality.

No.	Pos.	Nation	Player
—	FW	HUN	Ádám Hrepka (loan return from (Hungary) Vasas SC)
—	MF	HUN	Máté Skriba (on loan from (Hungary) Szombathely)
—	FW	HUN	Gábor Urbán (loan return from (Hungary) Paksi SE)
—	DF	HUN	Bence Zámbó (on loan from (Hungary) Győri ETO FC)
—	DF	MNE	Marko Radulović (loan return from (Montenegro) Petrovac)
—	MF	MNE	Dejan Vukadinovic (from (Hungary) Diósgyőri VTK)

Out: Note: Flags indicate national team as defined under FIFA eligibility rules; some limited exceptions apply. Players may hold more than one non-FIFA nationality.

No.	Pos.	Nation	Player
1	GK	HUN	Levente Szántai (released)
5	DF	HUN	András Vági (to (Switzerland) FC Aarau)
7	DF	HUN	Sándor Hidvégi (to (Hungary) Videoton FC)
8	MF	HUN	András Gosztonyi (to (Hungary) Videoton FC)
10	FW	HUN	János Lázok (loan return to (Hungary) Vasas SC)
11	FW	HUN	Vilmos Melczer (released)
17	MF	HUN	László Zsidai (on loan to (Netherlands) FC Volendam)
22	DF	HUN	István Rodenbücher (to (Hungary) Ferencvárosi TC)
32	MF	HUN	Lóránd Szatmári (loan return to (Italy) Reggina)
33	GK	HUN	Viktor Szentpéteri (to (Malta) Sliema Wanderers)
77	MF	HUN	Tamás Kulcsár (loan return to (Poland) Polonia)
—	DF	HUN	Ferenc Fodor (to (England) Oldham Athletic)
—	MF	HUN	Tamás Kecskés (to (Hungary) BFC Siófok)
—	MF	HUN	Gábor Bori (to (Hungary) Kecskeméti TE)
—	FW	HUN	Ádám Hrepka (to (Hungary) Vasas SC)

=== Paksi SE ===
In: Note: Flags indicate national team as defined under FIFA eligibility rules; some limited exceptions apply. Players may hold more than one non-FIFA nationality.

No.	Pos.	Nation	Player
—	FW	HUN	Tamás Csehi (loan return from (Hungary) Szolnok)
—	FW	HUN	Norbert Palásthy (from (Hungary) Budapest Honvéd)
—	MF	HUN	Tamás Sifter (from (Hungary) Videoton FC)
—	FW	HUN	Tibor Montvai (from (Hungary) Kecskeméti TE)
—	MF	HUN	László Miskolczi (from (Hungary) Nyíregyháza)
—	MF	HUN	Ádám Dudás (on loan from (Hungary) Győri ETO FC)

Out: Note: Flags indicate national team as defined under FIFA eligibility rules; some limited exceptions apply. Players may hold more than one non-FIFA nationality.

No.	Pos.	Nation	Player
9	FW	HUN	Gábor Urbán (loan return to (Hungary) MTK Budapest)
20	DF	HUN	Dániel Völgyi (loan return to (Hungary) Győri ETO FC)
21	FW	HUN	Attila Tököli (to (Hungary) Kecskeméti TE)

=== BFC Siófok ===
In: Note: Flags indicate national team as defined under FIFA eligibility rules; some limited exceptions apply. Players may hold more than one non-FIFA nationality.

No.	Pos.	Nation	Player
—	GK	SVK	Péter Molnár (on loan from (Hungary) Győri ETO FC)
—	DF	HUN	Gábor Kocsis (on loan from (Hungary) Videoton FC)
—	FW	HUN	József Piller (on loan from (Hungary) Vasas SC)
—	MF	HUN	Tihamér Lukács (from (Russia) FC Nizhny Novgorod)
—	MF	HUN	Tamás Kecskés (from (Hungary) MTK Budapest FC)
—	DF	HUN	Alexisz Novák (from (Hungary) Budapest Honvéd FC II)
—	FW	HUN	Imre Csermelyi (from (Hungary) Gyirmót SE)

Out: Note: Flags indicate national team as defined under FIFA eligibility rules; some limited exceptions apply. Players may hold more than one non-FIFA nationality.

No.	Pos.	Nation	Player
6	MF	HUN	Balázs Tóth (released)
7	MF	HUN	Roland Ribi (released)
8	MF	HUN	Lajos Nagy (released)
19	DF	HUN	Dániel Köntös (to (Hungary) FC Tatabánya)
23	MF	HUN	Zoltán Arany (released)

=== Szolnoki MÁV FC ===
In: Note: Flags indicate national team as defined under FIFA eligibility rules; some limited exceptions apply. Players may hold more than one non-FIFA nationality.

No.	Pos.	Nation	Player
12	GK	HUN	Péter Rézsó (loan return from (Hungary) Ceglédi VSE)
—	MF	CMR	Joseph N'galle (from (Hungary) Makó FC)
—	FW	HUN	Gábor Koós (from (Hungary) Budapest Honvéd FC)
—	MF	HUN	Zoltán Búrány (from (Hungary) Diósgyőri VTK)
—	MF	HUN	Norbert Kardos (on loan from (Hungary) Debrecen II)
—	MF	CMR	Hervé Tchami-Ngangoue (from (Czech Republic) MFK Karviná)
—	FW	LTU	Eimantas Marozas (from (Lithuania) Atletas Kaunas)
—	DF	HUN	Szabolcs Schindler (from (Hungary) Kecskeméti TE)
—	MF	HUN	Péter Vörös (from (Hungary) Kecskeméti TE)
—	MF	HUN	Mohamed Remili (on loan from (Hungary) Újpest FC)

Out: Note: Flags indicate national team as defined under FIFA eligibility rules; some limited exceptions apply. Players may hold more than one non-FIFA nationality.

No.	Pos.	Nation	Player
1	GK	HUN	Balázs Farkas (to (Cyprus) Akritas Chlorakas)
6	FW	CAN	Igor Pisanjuk (loan return to (Hungary) Ferencváros)
9	FW	HUN	Tamás Csehi (loan return to (Hungary) Paksi SE)
30	DF	HUN	Zsolt Nagy (released)

=== Szombathelyi Haladás ===
In: Note: Flags indicate national team as defined under FIFA eligibility rules; some limited exceptions apply. Players may hold more than one non-FIFA nationality.

No.	Pos.	Nation	Player
—	DF	HUN	Gábor Korolovszky (from (Cyprus) Aris Limassol)

Out: Note: Flags indicate national team as defined under FIFA eligibility rules; some limited exceptions apply. Players may hold more than one non-FIFA nationality.

No.	Pos.	Nation	Player
13	MF	HUN	Péter Halmosi (loan return to (England) Hull City AFC)
16	FW	HUN	Máté Skriba (on loan to (Hungary) MTK Budapest)
21	MF	SEN	El Hadji Diouf (loan return to (Greece) AEK Athens)
30	GK	HUN	Gergő Gőcze (on loan to (Hungary) Kozármisleny SE)
55	FW	SRB	Igor Bogdanović (to (Hungary) Hajdúböszörmény)
77	DF	HUN	Attila Kuttor (retired)

=== Újpest FC ===
In: Note: Flags indicate national team as defined under FIFA eligibility rules; some limited exceptions apply. Players may hold more than one non-FIFA nationality.

No.	Pos.	Nation	Player
10	FW	HUN	Tibor Tisza (loan return from (Belgium) Antwerp)
77	MF	HUN	Mohamed Remili (loan return from (Hungary) Vasas)
—	MF	HUN	István Bognár (from (Hungary) Vasas SC)
—	FW	HUN	Illés Sitku (on loan from (Hungary) Videoton FC)
—	MF	SRB	Nikola Mitrović (from (Serbia) Napredak Kruševac)
—	FW	HUN	Tamás Rubus (from (Hungary) Békéscsabai EFC)
—	FW	CRO	Marin Matoš (from (Austria) RB Salzburg)
—	GK	HUN	Antal Bozsó (from (Hungary) Békéscsabai EFC)
—	MF	HUN	Zoltán Böőr (from (Hungary) Nyíregyháza Spartacus)

Out: Note: Flags indicate national team as defined under FIFA eligibility rules; some limited exceptions apply. Players may hold more than one non-FIFA nationality.

No.	Pos.	Nation	Player
2	DF	SRB	Ivan Dudić (released)
3	MF	SCO	Mark Millar (loan return to (Scotland) Celtic F.C.)
5	MF	SRB	Dušan Vasiljević (to (Hungary) Videoton FC)
6	MF	ENG	Tony Stokes (released)
9	MF	ENG	Gary Martin (to (England) Middlesbrough F.C.)
14	FW	HUN	Roland Varga (loan return to (Italy) Brescia Calcio)
16	MF	HUN	Gábor Demjén (loan return to (Hungary) Videoton FC)
17	MF	HUN	Norbert Tóth (to (Hungary) Lombard-Pápa TFC)
19	DF	HUN	Tamás Vaskó (to (Hungary) Videoton FC)
20	FW	CTA	Foxi Kethevoama (to (Hungary) Kecskeméti TE)
21	MF	HUN	Zsolt Korcsmár (on loan to (Norway) SK Brann)
22	FW	HUN	Péter Kabát (to (Hungary) Debreceni VSC)
—	FW	CGO	Francis Litsingi (to (Hungary) Kecskeméti TE)
—	MF	HUN	Electo Wilson (to (Hungary) Kecskeméti TE)
—	MF	HUN	Mohamed Remili (on loan to (Hungary) Szolnoki MÁV)

=== Vasas SC ===
In: Note: Flags indicate national team as defined under FIFA eligibility rules; some limited exceptions apply. Players may hold more than one non-FIFA nationality.

No.	Pos.	Nation	Player
11	FW	HUN	János Lázok (loan return from (Hungary) MTK FC)
39	FW	HUN	Bence Balogh (from (Hungary) Vasas SC II)
—	MF	HUN	Marcell Matolcsi (from (Hungary) Vasas SC II)
—	FW	HUN	Patrik Csoór (from (Hungary) Vasas SC II)
—	MF	TUN	Helmi Loussaief (from (Tunisia) US Monastir)
—	FW	HUN	István Ferenczi (from (Hungary) Ferencvárosi TC)
—	MF	SRB	Goran Arnaut (from (Azerbaijan) FC Inter Baku)
—	FW	GEO	Vakhtang Pantskhava (from (Hungary) Győri ETO FC)
—	FW	SRB	Ljubomir Arsić (from (Serbia) FK Metalac)
—	FW	HUN	Ádám Hrepka (from (Hungary) MTK Budapest FC)

Out: Note: Flags indicate national team as defined under FIFA eligibility rules; some limited exceptions apply. Players may hold more than one non-FIFA nationality.

No.	Pos.	Nation	Player
2	MF	HUN	Balázs Villám (released)
4	DF	PAR	Oscar Mendoza (released)
12	GK	HUN	Attila Bartos (released)
14	MF	HUN	Tamás Tandari (released)
18	MF	URU	Pablo Caballero (to (Switzerland) FC Locarno)
19	FW	SRB	Petar Divić (to (Hungary) Pécsi Mecsek FC)
20	MF	FRA	Mamadou Danfa (released)
22	MF	BRA	Bruno Bosi (released)
23	MF	HUN	Péter Kincses (to (Hungary) Szigetszentmiklósi TK)
28	MF	HUN	István Bognár (to (Hungary) Újpest FC)
32	MF	HUN	József Piller (on loan to (Hungary) BFC Siófok)
77	MF	HUN	Mohamed Remili (loan return to (Hungary) Újpest FC)
—	DF	PAR	Antonio Arriola (released)
—	FW	HUN	Ádám Hrepka (loan return to (Hungary) MTK Budapest)

=== Videoton FC ===
In: Note: Flags indicate national team as defined under FIFA eligibility rules; some limited exceptions apply. Players may hold more than one non-FIFA nationality.

No.	Pos.	Nation	Player
4	DF	HUN	Sándor Hidvégi (from (Hungary) MTK Budapest)
10	MF	SWE	Bojan Djordjic (from (Sweden) AIK)
16	MF	HUN	András Gosztonyi (from (Hungary) MTK Budapest)
22	GK	MNE	Mladen Božović (from (Serbia) FK Partizan)
—	DF	SRB	Dušan Vasiljević (from (Hungary) Újpest FC)
—	MF	SWE	Martin Kayongo-Mutumba (from (Sweden) AIK)
—	DF	HUN	Tamás Vaskó (from (Hungary) Újpest FC)
—	MF	HUN	Gábor Demjén (loan return from (Hungary) Újpest FC)
—	GK	HUN	Bence Somodi (from (Hungary) Kazincbarcika)

Out: Note: Flags indicate national team as defined under FIFA eligibility rules; some limited exceptions apply. Players may hold more than one non-FIFA nationality.

No.	Pos.	Nation	Player
4	DF	HUN	Róbert Varga (to (Hungary) Zalaegerszegi TE)
6	MF	HUN	Tamás Sifter (to (Hungary) Paksi SE)
9	FW	HUN	Illés Sitku (on loan to (Hungary) Újpest FC)
10	MF	HUN	Zsolt Dvéri (retired)
22	GK	SRB	Nenad Filipović (released)
29	FW	HUN	Balázs Farkas (loan return to (Ukraine) Dynamo Kyiv)
—	DF	MNE	Milko Novaković (loan return to (Montenegro) FK Mogren)
—	DF	HUN	Gábor Kocsis (on loan to (Hungary) BFC Siófok)

=== Zalaegerszegi TE ===
In: Note: Flags indicate national team as defined under FIFA eligibility rules; some limited exceptions apply. Players may hold more than one non-FIFA nationality.

No.	Pos.	Nation	Player
13	MF	HUN	Zsolt Barna (from (Hungary) MTK Budapest FC)
26	FW	HUN	Ádám Vittman (from (Hungary) Zalaegerszegi TE II)
27	DF	HUN	Tamás Turcsik (from (Hungary) Zalaegerszegi TE II)
28	DF	HUN	Adrián Kocsis (from (Hungary) Zalaegerszegi TE II)
—	DF	AUT	Ahmet Dedic (from (Austria) SC Ostbahn XI)
—	MF	HUN	Gellért Ivancsics (from (Hungary) Diósgyőri VTK)
—	DF	HUN	Róbert Varga (from (Hungary) Videoton FC)

Out: Note: Flags indicate national team as defined under FIFA eligibility rules; some limited exceptions apply. Players may hold more than one non-FIFA nationality.

No.	Pos.	Nation	Player
11	FW	LVA	Artjoms Rudņevs (to (Poland) Lech Poznań)
15	MF	HUN	Márk Petneházi (to (Hungary) Orosháza FC)
20	MF	SVK	Marián Sluka (released)
