= 2010–11 Kaposvári Rákóczi FC season =

Kaposvári Rákóczi FC
2010–11 season
- Chairman: Miklós Horváth
- Manager: Tibor Sisa
- NB 1: 3.
- Magyar Kupa: 4. round
- Ligakupa: Group stage
- Highest home attendance: 3,500 vs Újpest FC (6 August 2010)
- Lowest home attendance: 1,500 vs Szombathelyi Haladás (14 August 2010)

The 2010–11 season will be Kaposvári Rákóczi FC's 12th competitive season, 7th consecutive season in the Soproni Liga and 87th year in existence as a football club.

== Team kit and logo ==
The team kits for the 2010–11 season are produced by Givova. The home kit is white colour and the away kit is green and white colours.

Home	Away

== Transfers ==
=== Summer ===
In: Note: Flags indicate national team as defined under FIFA eligibility rules; some limited exceptions apply. Players may hold more than one non-FIFA nationality.

No.	Pos.	Nation	Player
2	DF	HUN	József Zsók (from (Hungary) Bajai LSE)
3	FW	SRB	Milan Perić (from (Serbia) Metalac G.M.)
11	MF	MAR	Daniane Jawad (from (Italy) A.S.D. Mezzolara)
13	DF	SRB	Dražen Okuka (from (Serbia) FK Čukarički Stankom)
15	FW	HUN	Róbert Zsolnai (on loan from (Hungary) Bp. Honvéd)
16	MF	HUN	Norbert Lipusz (from (Hungary) Diósgyőri VTK)
22	MF	SRB	Bojan Pavlović (from (Serbia) FK Čukarički Stankom)
23	GK	HUN	József Strublics (on loan from (Hungary) Kaposvölgye)
24	DF	HUN	Dávid Hegedűs (from (Hungary) Eger FC)
33	MF	BRA	Pedro (from (Hungary) Kaposvölgye VSC)
84	DF	SVK	Mátyás Lelkes (from (Slovakia) DAC Dunajská Streda)

Out: Note: Flags indicate national team as defined under FIFA eligibility rules; some limited exceptions apply. Players may hold more than one non-FIFA nationality.

No.	Pos.	Nation	Player
3	DF	ITA	Gabriele Fabris (to (Italy) Crociati Noceto)
11	FW	BIH	Daniel Culum (to (Bosnia and Herzegovina) FK Drina Zvornik)
13	DF	BRA	Júnior (to (Hungary) Ferencvárosi TC)
15	MF	SRB	Dragan Antanasijević (to (Serbia) FK BASK)
19	MF	HUN	Krisztián Pest (released)
23	GK	HUN	László Horváth (on loan to (Hungary) Kaposvölgye)
25	MF	HUN	Gábor Bogdán (to (Hungary) Vasas SC)
27	MF	HUN	Bela Maróti (to (Hungary) Ferencvárosi TC)
30	MF	SRB	Srđan Stanić (to (Hungary) Ferencvárosi TC)
—	DF	SRB	Slobodan Markovic (to (Serbia) FK Napredak Kruševac)
—	DF	HUN	István Kerekes (to (Hungary) Orosháza FC)
—	DF	HUN	László Pintér (on loan to (Hungary) Kaposvölgye VSC)

List of Hungarian football transfer summer 2010

== Club ==
=== Coaching staff ===
Position	Staff
Manager	(Hungary) Tibor Sisa
Assistant managers	(Hungary) László Barna
Goalkeeper managers	(Hungary) László Házi
Head scout	(Hungary) László Pusztai
Club doctor	(Hungary) Dr. Árpád Néber
Masseur	(Hungary) Béla Végső
Masseur	(Hungary) István Hoffmann
Reserve team manager	(Hungary) Gábor Major
Youth team manager	(Hungary) Sándor Richter
Academy manager	(Hungary) János Bőzsöny

Last updated: 31 August 2010

=== Other information ===
General Manager	(Hungary) Miklós Horváth
Sport Director	(Hungary) János Bőzsöny
Technical Leader	(Hungary) Dr. István Pandurics
Communication Director	(Hungary) Ferenc Orosz
Ground (capacity and dimensions)	Stadion Kaposvár Rákoczi (7,000 / 105x68 meters)

Updated to match played 31 August 2010

== Squad ==
=== First team squad ===
Note: Flags indicate national team as defined under FIFA eligibility rules; some limited exceptions apply. Players may hold more than one non-FIFA nationality.

No.	Pos.	Nation	Player
1	GK	HUN	Árpád Milinte
3	FW	SRB	Milan Perić
6	DF	HUN	Róbert Kovácsevics
7	DF	BIH	Boris Gujić
8	MF	HUN	Kornél Kulcsár
9	FW	NGR	Egejuru Godslove
10	FW	HUN	Róbert Szepessy
11	MF	MAR	Daniane Jawad
13	DF	SRB	Dražen Okuka
14	FW	HUN	Lóránt Oláh
15	FW	HUN	Róbert Zsolnai

No.	Pos.	Nation	Player
16	MF	HUN	Norbert Lipusz
17	DF	HUN	Viktor Petrók
18	MF	HUN	Benjamin Balázs
22	MF	SRB	Bojan Pavlović
24	DF	HUN	Dávid Hegedűs
26	DF	HUN	Tamás Grúz
28	DF	HUN	Krisztián Zahorecz
29	GK	HUN	Zoltán Kovács
31	DF	HUN	József Zsók
33	MF	BRA	Pedro
84	DF	SVK	Mátyás Lelkes

=== League Cup squad ===
Note: Flags indicate national team as defined under FIFA eligibility rules; some limited exceptions apply. Players may hold more than one non-FIFA nationality.

No.	Pos.	Nation	Player
2	DF	HUN	József Zsók
6	DF	HUN	Róbert Kovácsevics
7	DF	BIH	Boris Gujić
8	MF	HUN	Kornél Kulcsár
11	MF	MAR	Daniane Jawad
12	GK	HUN	Zoltán Kovács
13	DF	SRB	Dražen Okuka
14	FW	HUN	Lóránt Oláh

No.	Pos.	Nation	Player
15	FW	HUN	Róbert Zsolnai
16	MF	HUN	Norbert Lipusz
17	DF	HUN	Viktor Petrók
18	MF	HUN	Benjamin Balázs
22	MF	SRB	Bojan Pavlović
24	DF	HUN	Dávid Hegedűs
26	DF	HUN	Tamás Grúz
33	MF	BRA	Pedro

== Statistics ==
=== Appearances and goals ===
Last updated on 27 November 2010.

No.	Pos	Nat	Player	Total		NB 1		Hungarian Cup		League Cup	
No.	Pos	Nat	Player	Apps	Goals	Apps	Goals	Apps	Goals	Apps	Goals
1	GK	(Hungary) HUN	Árpád Milinte	7	-9	4	-6	2	-2	1	-1
2	DF	(Hungary) HUN	Ferenc Keresztes	2	0	0	0	1	0	1	0
2	FW	(Montenegro) MNE	Marko Šćepanović	1	0	0	0	0	0	1	0
3	FW	(Serbia) SRB	Milan Perić	17	5	13	3	2	2	2	0
4	MF	(Hungary) HUN	Lukács Bőle	2	0	0	0	0	0	2	0
5	FW	(Montenegro) MNE	Stevan Pavićević	1	0	0	0	0	0	1	0
6	DF	(Hungary) HUN	Róbert Kovácsevics	6	0	3	0	1	0	2	0
7	DF	(Bosnia and Herzegovina) BIH	Boris Gujić	16	1	14	1	1	0	1	0
8	MF	(Hungary) HUN	Kornél Kulcsár	21	1	16	1	2	0	3	0
9	FW	(Nigeria) NGR	Egejuru Godslove	10	0	7	0	2	0	1	0
10	FW	(Hungary) HUN	Róbert Szepessy	14	1	12	1	1	0	1	0
11	MF	(Morocco) MAR	Daniane Jawad	15	3	14	3	0	0	1	0
12	GK	(Hungary) HUN	József Strublics	1	-3	0	0	0	0	1	-3
13	DF	(Serbia) SRB	Dražen Okuka	15	0	14	0	0	0	1	0
14	FW	(Hungary) HUN	Lóránt Oláh	19	11	15	9	2	1	2	1
15	FW	(Hungary) HUN	Róbert Zsolnai	8	1	4	0	2	1	2	0
16	MF	(Hungary) HUN	Olivér Kovács	4	0	0	0	2	0	2	0
17	DF	(Hungary) HUN	Viktor Petrók	6	1	1	0	2	1	3	0
18	MF	(Hungary) HUN	Benjamin Balázs	19	0	16	0	1	0	2	0
19	MF	(Hungary) HUN	Norbert Lipusz	6	0	1	0	2	0	3	0
20	MF	(Hungary) HUN	Tamás Horváth	1	0	0	0	0	0	1	0
22	MF	(Serbia) SRB	Bojan Pavlović	17	4	13	3	1	0	3	1
24	DF	(Hungary) HUN	Dávid Hegedűs	14	0	13	0	0	0	1	0
26	DF	(Hungary) HUN	Tamás Grúz	17	2	15	2	0	0	2	0
28	DF	(Hungary) HUN	Krisztián Zahorecz	10	0	6	0	2	0	2	0
29	GK	(Hungary) HUN	Zoltán Kovács	13	-15	12	-14	0	0	1	-1
31	DF	(Hungary) HUN	József Zsók	17	1	15	1	0	0	2	0
33	MF	(Brazil) BRA	Pedro	15	1	14	1	0	0	1	0
84	DF	(Slovakia) SVK	Mátyás Lelkes	5	0	1	0	2	0	2	0

=== Top scorers ===
Includes all competitive matches. The list is sorted by shirt number when total goals are equal.

Last updated on 27 November 2010

Position	Nation	Number	Name	Soproni Liga	Hungarian Cup	League Cup	Total
1	(Hungary) (Serbia)	14	Lóránt Oláh	9	1	1	11
2	(Serbia)	3	Milan Perić	3	2	0	5
3	(Serbia)	22	Bojan Pavlović	3	0	1	4
4	(Morocco)	11	Daniane Jawad	3	0	0	3
5	(Hungary)	26	Tamás Grúz	2	0	0	2
6	(Hungary)	8	Kornél Kulcsár	1	0	0	1
7	(Hungary)	31	József Zsók	1	0	0	1
8	(Bosnia and Herzegovina)	7	Boris Gujić	1	0	0	1
9	(Hungary)	10	Róbert Szepessy	1	0	0	1
10	(Brazil)	33	Pedro	1	0	0	1
11	(Hungary)	15	Róbert Zsolnai	0	1	0	1
12	(Hungary)	17	Viktor Petrók	0	1	0	1
/	/	/	Own Goals	1	0	0	1
			TOTALS	26	5	2	33

=== Disciplinary record ===
Includes all competitive matches. Players with 1 card or more included only.

Last updated on 27 November 2010

Position	Nation	Number	Name	Soproni Liga		Hungarian Cup		League Cup		Total (Hu Total)	
Position	Nation	Number	Name	Yellow card	Red card	Yellow card	Red card	Yellow card	Red card	Yellow card	Red card
FW	(Serbia)	3	Milan Perić	1	0	0	0	0	0	1 (1)	0 (0)
FW	(Montenegro)	5	Stevan Pavićević	0	0	0	0	1	0	1 (0)	0 (0)
DF	(Bosnia and Herzegovina)	7	Boris Gujić	2	0	0	0	0	0	2 (2)	0 (0)
MF	(Hungary)	8	Kornél Kulcsár	4	0	2	0	1	0	7 (4)	0 (0)
FW	(Nigeria)	9	Egejuru Godslove	0	0	1	0	0	0	1 (0)	0 (0)
FW	(Hungary)	10	Róbert Szepessy	2	0	0	0	1	0	3 (2)	0 (0)
MF	(Morocco)	11	Daniane Jawad	1	0	0	0	0	0	1 (1)	0 (0)
DF	(Serbia)	13	Dražen Okuka	6	0	0	0	0	0	6 (6)	0 (0)
FW	(Hungary)	14	Lóránt Oláh	3	0	0	0	0	0	3 (3)	0 (0)
MF	(Hungary)	16	Olivér Kovács	0	0	1	0	1	0	2 (0)	0 (0)
DF	(Hungary)	17	Viktor Petrók	0	0	1	0	0	0	1 (0)	0 (0)
MF	(Hungary)	18	Benjamin Balázs	2	0	0	0	0	0	2 (2)	0 (0)
MF	(Hungary)	19	Norbert Lipusz	0	0	0	0	1	0	1 (0)	0 (0)
MF	(Serbia)	22	Bojan Pavlović	1	1	0	0	0	0	1 (1)	1 (1)
DF	(Hungary)	24	Dávid Hegedűs	4	0	0	0	0	0	4 (4)	0 (0)
DF	(Hungary)	26	Tamás Grúz	5	0	0	0	0	0	5 (5)	0 (0)
DF	(Hungary)	28	Krisztián Zahorecz	1	1	0	0	0	0	1 (1)	1 (1)
DF	(Hungary)	31	József Zsók	3	1	0	0	1	0	4 (3)	1 (1)
MF	(Brazil)	33	Pedro	3	0	0	0	0	0	3 (3)	0 (0)
DF	(Slovakia)	84	Mátyás Lelkes	1	0	1	0	0	0	2 (1)	0 (0)
			TOTALS	39	3	6	0	6	0	51 (39)	3 (3)

=== Overall ===
Games played	21 (16 Soproni Liga, 2 Magyar Kupa and 3 Ligakupa)
Games won	11 (9 Soproni Liga, 2 Magyar Kupa and 0 Ligakupa)
Games drawn	4 (2 Soproni Liga, 0 Magyar Kupa and 2 Ligakupa)
Games lost	6 (5 Soproni Liga, 0 Magyar Kupa and 1 Ligakupa)
Goals scored	33
Goals conceded	27
Goal difference	+6
Yellow cards	51
Red cards	3
Worst discipline	(Hungary) Kornél Kulcsár (7 (yellow card) , 0 (red card) )
Best result	5–3 (A) v Zalaegerszegi TE – Nemzeti Bajnokság I – 31-07-2010
Best result	2–0 (A) v MTK Budapest FC – Nemzeti Bajnokság I – 09-10-2010
Worst result	1–4 (H) v Videoton FC Fehérvár – Nemzeti Bajnokság I – 06-11-2010
Worst result	0–3 (H) v BFC Siófok – Ligakupa – 24-11-2010
Most appearances	(Hungary) Kornél Kulcsár (21 appearances)
Top scorer	(Hungary) (Serbia) Lóránt Oláh (11 goals)
Points	37/63 (58.73%)

Last updated: 27 November 2010

== Nemzeti Bajnokság I ==
=== Classification ===
Pos	Team	Pld	W	D	L	GF	GA	GD	Pts
5	Debrecen	30	12	10	8	53	43	+10	46
6	Újpest	30	13	6	11	50	38	+12	45
7	Kaposvár	30	13	4	13	41	42	−1	43
8	Haladás	30	11	8	11	42	36	+6	41
9	Győr	30	10	11	9	40	35	+5	41

Source: soccerway.com
Rules for classification: 1st points; 2nd overall wins; 3rd goal difference; 4th goals scored

=== Results summary ===
Overall								Home						Away					
Pld	W	D	L	GF	GA	GD	Pts	W	D	L	GF	GA	GD	W	D	L	GF	GA	GD
16	9	2	5	26	20	+6	29	5	1	3	13	11	+2	4	1	2	13	9	+4

Last updated: 27 November 2010.
Source: NB1

=== Results by round ===
Round	1	2	3	4	5	6	7	8	9	10	11	12	13	14	15	16	17	18	19	20	21	22	23	24	25	26	27	28	29	30
Ground	A	H	H	A	H	A	H	A	H	A	H	A	H	A	H	H	A	A	H	A	H	A	H	A	H	A	H	A	H	A
Result	W	L	W	D	W	W	L	W	W	L	D	L	L	W	W	W														
Position	1	7	3	3	2	1	3	2	2	2	3	6	8	6	5	3														

Updated to match(es) played on 27 November 2010. Source: Matches
A = Away; H = Home; W = Win; D = Draw; L = Loss

=== Matches ===
31 July 2010
19:00 CEST

Zalaegerszegi TE	3–5 (1–4)	Kaposvári Rákóczi FC
Rudņevs 45' 60'; Kovács (yellow card) 55'; Máté (yellow card) 64'; Balázs 66'	(Report)	Pavlović 16' 59'; Kovács 28' (o.g.); Oláh 28'; Grúz 45'; Balázs (yellow card) 54'; Gujić (yellow card) 66'

ZTE Arena, Zalaegerszeg
Attendance: 1,500
Referee: Tamás Bognár
- Zalaegerszegi TE: Vlaszák – Kocsárdi, Miljatovic (Szalai 32.), Kovács, Varga – Balázs, Kamber, Máté (Magasföldi 69.), Illés (Horváth A. 39.) – Rudnevs, Pavicevic. Coach: János Csank.
- Kaposvári Rákóczi FC: Kovács – Zsók, Grúz, Okuka, Balázs – Gujic, Pavlovic, Kulcsár (Hegedűs 62.), Pedro – Oláh (Zsolnai 65.), Jawad (Godslove 80.). Coach: Tibor Sisa.
- G.: Rudnevs (45., 60.), Balázs (66.) – Pavlovic (16., 59.), Kovács (28. – o.g.), Oláh (28.), Grúz (45.)
- Y.: Kovács (55.), Máté (64.) – Balázs (54.), Gujic (66.)

6 August 2010
19:00 CEST

Kaposvári Rákóczi FC	0–1 (0–0)	Újpest FC
Kulcsár (yellow card) 25'; Zsók (yellow card) 35'	(Report)	Egerszegi (yellow card) 11'; Grúz 46' (o.g.); Tisza (red card) 70'; Takács (yellow card) 90+1'; Banai (yellow card) 90+3'

Stadion Kaposvár Rákoczi, Kaposvár
Attendance: 3,500
Referee: József Berger
- Kaposvári Rákóczi FC: Kovács – Okuka, Grúz, Zsók, Gujic – Kulcsár (Szepessy 70.), Balázs (Hegedűs 64.), Pavlovic, Pedro (Zsolnai 80.), Jawad – Oláh. Coach: Tibor Sisa.
- Újpest FC: Balajcza – Szokol, Vermes, Takács, Pollák – Simek (Banai 87.), Egerszegi (Böőr 72.), Rajczi, Mitrovic (Rubus 91.), Tajthy – Tisza. Coach: Géza Mészöly.
- G.: Grúz (46. – o.g.)
- Y.: Kulcsár (25.), Zsók (35.) – Egerszegi (11.), Takács (91.), Banai (93.)
- R.: Tisza (70.)

14 August 2010
19:00 CEST

Kaposvári Rákóczi FC	1–0 (1–0)	Szombathelyi Haladás
Jawad 9'; Gujić (yellow card) 22'; Pavlović (yellow card) 58'; Okuka (yellow card) 80'	(Report)	Iszlai (yellow card) 68'; G. Nagy (yellow card) 85'

Stadion Kaposvár Rákoczi, Kaposvár
Attendance: 1,500
Referee: Zsolt Szabó
- Kaposvári Rákóczi FC: Kovács – Grúz, Okuka, Zsók – Gujic, Pedro, Balázs, Kulcsár (Peric 79.), Jawad (Godslove 90.) – Pavlovic, Szepessy (Zsolnai 57.). Coach: Tibor Sisa.
- Szombathelyi Haladás: Rózsa – Schimmer, Lengyel, Guzmics, Tóth – Iszlai (Kovács 69.), Molnár, Á. Simon – G. Nagy, Oross (Rácz 73.), Ugrai. Coach: Aurél Csertői.
- G.: Jawad (9.)
- Y.: Gujic (22.), Pavlovic (58.), Okuka (80.) – Iszlai (68.), G. Nagy (85.)

21 August 2010
19:00 CEST

BFC Siófok	0–0 (0–0)	Kaposvári Rákóczi FC
	(Report)	Szepessy (yellow card) 19'; Okuka (yellow card) 29'; Oláh (yellow card) 88'; Hegedűs (yellow card) 90+1'

Révesz Géza Stadion, Siófok
Attendance: 2,500
Referee: Tamás Bognár
- BFC Siófok: Molnár – Fehér, Graszl, Mogyorósi, Novák – Kecskés (Lukács 61.), Kocsis, Ludánszki, Thiago (Csermelyi 77.), Délczeg (Roni 61.) – Sowunmi. Coach: István Mihalecz.
- Kaposvári Rákóczi FC: Kovács – Okuka, Grúz, Zsók, Gujic – Pedro, Kulcsár (Peric 74.), Balázs, Jawad – Pavlovic (Hegedűs 64.), Szepessy (Oláh 46.). Coach: Tibor Sisa.
- G.: —
- Y.: Szepessy (19.), Okuka (26.), Oláh (88.), Hegedűs (91.)

28 August 2010
19:00 CEST

Kaposvári Rákóczi FC	3–2 (0–1)	Lombard-Pápa TFC
Grúz (yellow card) 50' (goal) 84'; Kulcsár (yellow card) 68' (goal) 87'; Zsók 90+2'	(Report)	Bárányos (yellow card) 32'; Abwo 36'; P. Takács 79' (red card) 83'

Stadion Kaposvár Rákoczi, Kaposvár
Attendance: 2,000
Referee: János Takács
- Kaposvári Rákóczi FC: Kovács – Okuka, Grúz, Zsók, Gujic – Godslove (Pavlovic 50.), Balázs (Kulcsár 50.), Lipusz, Hegedűs, Oláh – Peric (Szepessy 87.). Coach: Tibor Sisa.
- Lombard-Pápa TFC: Szűcs – Quintero (Zulevs 71.), Bíró, Farkas, P. Takács – Németh, Gyömbér, Jovánczai (Rebryk 62.) – Abwo, Bárányos, Maric (Venczel 83.). Coach: György Véber.
- G.: Grúz (84.), Kulcsár (87.), Zsók (92.) – Abwo (36.), P. Takács (79.)
- Y.: Grúz (50.), Kulcsár (68.) – Bárányos (32.)
- R.: P. Takács (83.)

10 September 2010
17:00 CEST

Vasas SC	1–3 (0–2)	Kaposvári Rákóczi FC
Arnaut (yellow card) 10'; Bakos (yellow card) 29'; Ferenczi 52' (pen.) (red card) 55'; Gáspár (yellow card) 81' (yellow-red card) 86'	(Report)	Pavlović 13' (pen.); Jawad 14' (yellow card) 69'; Pedro (yellow card) 30'; Hegedűs (yellow card) 41'; Grúz (yellow card) 52'; Gujić 68' (pen.)

Stadion Rudolf Illovszky, Budapest
Attendance: 750
Referee: Ferenc Bede
- Vasas SC: Végh – Balog (Polényi 75.), Arnaut, Gáspár, Katona (Arsic 80.) – Lázok, Pavicevic, Hrepka (Phantkhava 46.), Bakos, Benounes – Ferenczi. Coach: Giovanni Dellacasa.
- Kaposvári Rákóczi FC: Kovács – Okuka, Grúz, Zsók, Gujic – Szepessy (Peric 90.), Pedro (Kulcsár 70.), Hegedűs, Jawad – Oláh, Pavlovic (Balázs 46.). Coach: Tibor Sisa.
- G.: Ferenczi (52. – pen.) – Pavlovic (13. – pen.), Jawad (14.), Gujic (68. – pen.)
- Y.: Arnaut (10.), Bakos (29.), Gáspár (81.) – Pedro (30.), Hegedűs (41.), Grúz (52.), Jawad (69.)
- R.: Ferenczi (55.), Gáspár (86.)

17 September 2010
17:00 CEST

Kaposvári Rákóczi FC	1–2 (1–0)	Paksi SE
Oláh 25' (pen.); Balázs (yellow card) 35'; Zsók (yellow card) 47'; Lelkes (yellow card) 57'	(Report)	Sifter (yellow card) 30'; Böde 61'; Éger (yellow card) 62'; Montvai 65'; Fiola (yellow card) 90+1'

Stadion Kaposvár Rákoczi, Kaposvár
Attendance: 1,500
Referee: Szabolcs Szilasi
- Kaposvári Rákóczi FC: Kovács – Lelkes, Grúz (Zahorecz 67.), Zsók, Gujic – Szepessy (Kulcsár 75.), Pedro, Hegedűs, Balázs (Zsolnai 62.) – Oláh, Jawad. Coach: Tibor Sisa.
- Paksi SE: Csernyánszki – Fiola, Éger, Sifter (Szabó 65.), Ceehi – Bartha, Heffler, Sipeki (Böde 46.), Vayer – Montvai, Kiss (Magasföldi 85.). Coach: Károly Kis.
- G.: Oláh (25. – pen.) – Böde (61.), Montvai (65.)
- Y.: Balázs (35.), Zsók (47.), Lelkes (57.) – Sifter (30.), Éger (62.), Fiola (91.)

9 October 2010
17:00 CEST

MTK Budapest FC	0–2 (0–1)	Kaposvári Rákóczi FC
Ladányi (yellow card) 39'; Pátkai (yellow card) 53'	(Report)	Perić 31'; Grúz (yellow card) 51'; Okuka (yellow card) 62'; Oláh 70'

Hidegkuti Nándor Stadium, Budapest
Attendance: 800
Referee: Mihály Fábián
- MTK Budapest FC: Szatmári – Vukadinovic, Szekeres, Sütő – Pátkai, Ladányi (Eppel 87.), Vukmir (Vadnai 56.), Kanta – Tischler, A. Pál, Könyves. Coach: József Garami.
- Kaposvári Rákóczi FC: Kovács – Grúz, Gujic, Zahorecz, Zsók, Okuka – Pavlovic, Pedro, Jawad (Balázs 66.) – Peric (Kulcsár 85.), Oláh (Szepessy 89.). Coach: Tibor Sisa.
- G.: Peric (31.), Oláh (70.)
- Y.: Ladányi (39.), Pátkai (53.) – Grúz (51.), Okuka (62.)

2 October 2010
18:00 CEST

Kaposvári Rákóczi FC	2–1 (2–1)	Kecskeméti TE
Oláh (yellow card) 15' (goal) 37'; Jawad 19'	(Report)	Gyagya 12' (yellow card) 87'; Bori (yellow card) 64'; Čukić (yellow card) 71'

Stadion Kaposvár Rákoczi, Kaposvár
Attendance: 2,000
Referee: Alvaro Miquel Garcia
- Kaposvári Rákóczi FC: Kovács – Okuka, Zahorecz, Zsók, Gujic – Hegedűs (Kulcsár 53.), Balázs, Pedro (Grúz 85.), Jawad (Pavlovic 73.) – Oláh, Peric. Coach: Tibor Sisa.
- Kecskeméti TE: Rybánsky – Némedi, Gyagya, Balogh, Mohl – Csordás, Cukic, Koncz (Savic 60.), Litsingi (Bori 55.), Foxi – Tököli. Coach: István Szabó.
- G.: Jawad (19.), Oláh (37.) – Gyagya (12.)
- Y.: Oláh (15.) – Bori (64.), Cukic (71.), Gyagya (87.)

16 October 2010
17:30 CEST

Ferencvárosi TC	1–0 (1–0)	Kaposvári Rákóczi FC
Andrezinho (yellow card) 33'; Rósa 44' (pen.); Rodenbücher (yellow card) 52'; Maróti (yellow card) 66' (yellow-red card) 75'	(Report)	Zsók (yellow card) 14'; Okuka (yellow card) 33'; Oláh (yellow card) 36'; Grúz (yellow card) 40'; Zahorecz (yellow card) 78' (yellow-red card) 89'; Kulcsár (yellow card) 81'

Stadion Albert Flórián, Budapest
Attendance: 5,000
Referee: Ferenc Bede
- Ferencvárosi TC: Ranilovic – Balog, Csizmadia, Rodenbücher, Adriano – Andrezinho (Józsi 80.), Maróti, Rósa, Stanic (Tóth 71.), Schembri – Miljkovic (Heinz 57.). Coach: László Prukner.
- Kaposvári Rákóczi FC: Kovács – Grúz (Balázs 69.), Okuka, Zahorecz, Zsók – Gujic, Pavlovic, Pedro, Jawad (Godslove 81.) – Oláh, Peric (Kulcsár 62.). Coach: Tibor Sisa.
- G.: Rósa (44. – pen.)
- Y.: Andrezinho (33.), Rodenbücher (52.), Maróti (66.) – Zsók (14.), Okuka (33.), Oláh (36.), Grúz (40.), Zahorecz (78.), Kulcsár (81.)
- R.: Maróti (75.) – Zahorecz (89.)

23 October 2010
17:00 CEST

Kaposvári Rákóczi FC	0–0 (0–0)	Budapest Honvéd FC
Pavlović (yellow card) 61' (yellow-red card) 68'	(Report)	Coira (yellow card) 40'; Sadjo (yellow card) 83'; Moreira (yellow card) 89'

Stadion Kaposvár Rákóczi, Kaposvár
Attendance: 2,500
Referee: János Takács
- Kaposvári Rákóczi FC: Kovács – Gujic (Kovácsevics 9.), Okuka, Grúz, Zsók – Hegedűs, Kulcsár, Pavlovic, Jawad (Balázs 79.) – Oláh (Szepessy 86.), Peric. Coach: Tibor Sisa.
- Budapest Honvéd FC: Kemenes – Takács, Debreceni, Botis, Hajdú – Moreira, Abass (Rufino 90.), Horváth, Coira, Sadjo (Bojtor 85.) – Rouani (Danilo 43.). Coach: Massimo Morales.
- G.: —
- Y.: Pavlovic (61.) – Coria (40.), Sadjo (83.), Moreira (89.)
- R.: Pavlovic (68.)

29 October 2010
17:30 CEST

Debreceni VSC	3–1 (1–1)	Kaposvári Rákóczi FC
Šimac (yellow card) 31'; Bódi 36'; Czvitkovics 71' 75'	(Report)	Kulcsár (yellow card) 38'; Oláh 43'; Grúz (yellow card) 70'; Pedro (yellow card) 77'

Stadion Oláh Gábor Út, Debrecen
Attendance: 3,000
Referee: Zsolt Szabó
- Debreceni VSC: Malinauskas – Nagy, Mijadinoski, Simac, Fodor – Czvitkovics, Bódi (Dombi 55.), Varga, Szakály – Coulibaly (Szilágyi 66.), Yannick (Kiss 73.). Coach: András Herczeg.
- Kaposvári Rákóczi FC: Kovács – Grúz, Okuka, Zsók, Kovácsevics – Kulcsár (Godslove 76.), Pedro, Oláh, Hegedűs, Jawad (Balázs 70.) – Peric. Coach: Tibor Sisa.
- G.: Bódi (36.), Czvitkovics (71., 75.) – Oláh (43.)
- Y.: Simac (31.) – Kulcsár (38.), Grúz (70.), Pedro (77.)

6 November 2010
15:00 CEST

Kaposvári Rákóczi FC	1–4 (0–3)	Videoton FC Fehérvár
Perić (yellow card) 25'; Oláh 77'; Zsók (red card) 89'	(Report)	Alves 2' (pen.) 22'; Vasiljević 12'; Elek 67'

Stadion Kaposvár Rákoczi, Kaposvár
Attendance: 2,500
Referee: Sándor Andó-Szabó
- Kaposvári Rákóczi FC: Milinte – Petrók, Okuka (Godslove 83.), Zsók, Kovácsevics – Pavlovic, Pedro (Kulcsár 57.), Oláh, Hegedűs, Balázs – Peric (Szepessy 78.). Coach: Tibor Sisa.
- Videoton FC Fehérvár: Bozovic – Lázár, Lipták, Vaskó, Andic – Sándor (Mutumba 72.), Vasiljevic (Szakály 46.), Farkas, Elek, Polonkai – Alves (Nikolic 61.). Coach: György Mezey.
- G.: Oláh (77.) – Alves (2. – pen., 22.), Vasiljevic (12.), Elek (67.)
- Y.: Peric (25.)
- R.: Zsók (89.)

13 November 2010
13:00 CEST

Szolnoki MÁV FC	1–2 (0–1)	Kaposvári Rákóczi FC
Pető (yellow card) 9'; Ngalle 60'; Cornaci (yellow card) 62'	(Report)	Szepessy 2' (yellow card) 90'; Okuka (yellow card) 14'; Hegedűs (yellow card) 16'; Perić 66'; Zahorecz (yellow card) 86'

Tiszaligeti Stadion, Szolnok
Attendance: 1,000
Referee: Alvaro Miquel Garcia
- Szolnoki MÁV FC: Rézsó – Cornaci, Balogh, Pető, Szalai – Ngalle, Molnár, Búrány (Hevesi-Tóth 69.), Antal (Vörös 77.), Remili – Koós (Lengyel 71.). Coach: Antal Simon.
- Kaposvári Rákóczi FC: Milinte – Gujic, Grúz, Okuka, Zahorecz – Hegedűs, Kulcsár (Pedro 68.), Szepessy, Balázs, Jawad (Peric 59.) – Oláh (Godslove 88.). Coach: Tibor Sisa.
- G.: Ngalle (60.) – Szepessy (2.), Peric (66.)
- Y.: Pető (9.), Cornaci (62.) – Okuka (14.), Hegedűs (16.), Zahorecz (86.), Szepessy (90.)

19 November 2010
17:00 CEST

Kaposvári Rákóczi FC	3–0 (1–0)	Győri ETO FC
Oláh 13' 57'; Pedro (yellow card) 38' (goal) 59'	(Report)	Ganugrava (yellow card) 12'; Copa (yellow card) 13'; Völgyi (yellow card) 63'; Pilibaitis (yellow card) 67'

Stadion Kaposvár Rákoczi, Kaposvár
Attendance: 1,500
Referee: Péter Solymosi
- Kaposvári Rákóczi FC: Milinte – Grúz, Zsók, Zahorecz – Gujic, Hegedűs, Balázs, Pedro, Jawad (Pavlovic 86.) – Szepessy (Kulcsár 56.), Oláh (Peric 77.). Coach: Tibor Sisa.
- Győri ETO FC: Stevanovic – Copa, Djordjevic, Eugene, Völgyi – Trajkovic (Sharashenidze 60.), Ganugrava (Ji-Paraná 30.), Pilibaitis (Briones 68.), Koltai – Ceolin, Bouguerra. Coach: Attila Pintér.
- G.: Oláh (13., 57.), Pedro (59.)
- Y.: Pedro (38.) – Ganugrava (12.), Copa (13.), Völgyi (63.), Pilibaitis (67.)

27 November 2010
16:00 CEST

Kaposvári Rákóczi FC	2–1 (2–1)	Zalaegerszegi TE
Oláh 11'; Perić 13'; Hegedűs (yellow card) 16'; Okuka (yellow card) 26'	(Report)	Simon 1'; Varga (yellow card) 12'; Kamber (yellow card) 21'; Rajcomar (yellow card) 26'

Stadion Kaposvár Rákoczi, Kaposvár
Attendance: 1,500
Referee: Mihály Fábián
- Kaposvári Rákóczi FC: Milinte – Gujic (Jawad 46.), Grúz, Okuka, Zsók – Pavlovic, Balázs, Hegedűs (Szepessy 69.), Pedro – Oláh, Peric (Kulcsár 85.). Coach: Tibor Sisa.
- Zalaegerszegi TE: Vlaszák – Kocsárdi (Turcsik 70.), Miljatovic, Varga, Panikvar – Szalai, Horváth (Delic 62.), Kamber, Illés (Bogunovic 83.) – Simon, Rajcomar. Coach: János Csank.
- G.: Oláh (11.), Peric (13.) – Simon (1.)
- Y.: Hegedűs (16.), Okuka (26.) – Varga (12.), Kamber (21.), Rajcomar (26.)

== Hungarian Cup ==
=== Third round ===
22 September 2010
15:30 CEST

Szekszárdi UFC	1–3 (1–1)	Kaposvári Rákóczi FC
Tóth (yellow card) 30'; Kohány 38'; Kőkuti (yellow card) 55'	(Report)	Zsolnai 29'; Perić 68' 79'; Kulcsár (yellow card) 78'

Stadion Városi, Szekszárd
Attendance: 200
Referee: Ákos Pákolicz
- Szekszárdi UFC: Horváth – Dienes, Kőkuti (Buzás 88.), Tóth, Calka – Ranga (Benizs 72.), Koch, Deli, Pákai (Letenyei 80.) – Mészáros, Kohány. Coach: Pál Dienes.
- Kaposvári Rákóczi FC: Milinte – Kovácsevics, Petrók, Zahorecz, Lelkes – Keresztes (Oláh 55.), O. Kovács, Godslove (Peric 59.), Kulcsár – Lipusz, Zsolnai (Gujic 70.). Coach: Tibor Sisa.
- G.: Kohány (38.) – Zsolnai (29.), Peric (68., 79.)
- Y.: Tóth (30.), Kőkuti (55.) – Kulcsár (78.)

=== Fourth round ===
26 October 2010
14:30 CEST

Dunaharaszti MTK	1–2 (0–0)	Kaposvári Rákóczi FC
Wágner (red card) 11'; Riba (yellow card) 28'; Füzi (yellow card) 45'; Nánási (yellow card) 48'; Szemán 65' (pen.)	(Report)	O. Kovács (yellow card) 33'; Lelkes (yellow card) 55'; Petrók 58' (yellow card) 64'; Kulcsár (yellow card) 73'; Godslove (yellow card) 90+2'; Oláh 112'

Városi Sporttelep, Dunaharaszti
Attendance: 200
Referee: Balázs Berke
- Dunaharaszti MTK: Szappanos – Rétsági, Ughy, Hajba (Grimm 80.), Riba – Wágner, Kaszai, Szemán, Füzi (Graeser 68., Kovacsik 112.) – Dabasi, Nánási. Coach: Péter Króner.
- Kaposvári Rákóczi FC: Milinte – Godslove, Petrók, Zahorecz, Lelkes – O. Kovács (Kulcsár 57.), Balázs Pavlovic, Zsolnai (Oláh 56.) – Lipusz (Peric 69.), Szepessy. Coach: Tibor Sisa.
- G.: Szemán (65. – pen.) – Petrók (58.), Oláh (112.)
- Y.: Riba (28.), Füzi (45.), Nánási (48.) – O. Kovács (33.), Lelkes (55.), Petrók (64.), Kulcsár (73.), Godslove (92.)
- R.: Wágner (11.)

== League Cup ==
=== Group stage ===
Pos	Team	Pld	W	D	L	GF	GA	GD	Pts	Qualification
1	Siófok	4	3	1	0	8	3	+5	10	Advance to knockout phase
2	Újpest	4	1	1	2	6	6	0	4	
3	Kaposvár	4	0	2	2	3	8	−5	2	

24 July 2010
20:00 CEST

Kaposvári Rákóczi FC	1–1 (1–0)	Újpest FC
Oláh 23'; Lipusz (yellow card) 89'	(Report)	Tajthy (red card) 45'; Simon 56'

Stadion Kaposvár Rákoczi, Kaposvár
Attendance: 1,500
Referee: Péter Solymosi
- Kaposvári Rákóczi FC: Kovács – Okuka, Grúz (Petrók 77.), Zsók, Kovácsevics (Gujic 58.) – Pedro, Balázs (Hegedűs 88.), Jawad, Pavlovic (Lipusz 73.) – Kulcsár (Zsolnai 67.), Oláh. Coach: Tibor Sisa.
- Újpest FC: Balajcza – Tajthy, Takács, Simon (Banai 84.), Rajczi, Sitku, Kiss, Vermes, Privigyei (Bognár 78.), Egerszegi (Rubus 89.), Szokol. Coach: Géza Mészöly.
- G.: Oláh (23.) – Simon (56.)
- Y.: Lipusz (89.)
- R.: Tajthy (45.)

3 November 2010
17:15 CEST

BFC Siófok	1–1 (1–0)	Kaposvári Rákóczi FC
Ivancsics (yellow card) 19' (goal) 36'	(Report)	Szepessy (yellow card) 33'; O. Kovács (yellow card) 55'; Zahorecz (yellow card) 67'; Pavlović 78'; Kulcsár (yellow card) 90+1'

Révesz Géza Stadion, Siófok
Attendance: 1,500
Referee: Gábor Oláh
- BFC Siófok: Szalma – Tusori (Horváth 46.), Mogyorósi, Pécseli, Novák (Lukács 70.) – Tóth, Kecskés (Ludánszki 46.), Kocsis (Fehér 46.), Piller – Ivancsics (Délczeg 46.), Csermelyi. Coach: István Mihalecz.
- Kaposvári Rákóczi FC: Milinte – Godslove, Grúz, Keresztes (Balázs 48.), Petrók (Zahorecz 53.) – Lelkes, Szepessy (Kulcsár 54.), Lipusz (Pavlovic 64.), O. Kovács – Bőle, Zsolnai (Peric 79.). Coach: Tibor Sisa.
- G.: Ivancsics (36.) – Pavlovic (78.)
- Y.: Ivancsics (19.) – Szepessy (33.), O. Kovács (55.), Zahorecz (67.), Kulcsár (91.)

24 November 2010
18:00 CEST

Kaposvári Rákóczi FC	0–3 (0–1)	BFC Siófok
Pavićević (yellow card) 33'	(Report)	Thiago 12'; Graszl (yellow card) 33'; Homma 65'; Kecskés 67'

Stadion Kaposvár Rákoczi, Kaposvár
Attendance: 200
Referee: Alvaro Miquel Garcia
- Kaposvári Rákóczi FC: Strublics – Kovácsevics, Petrók, Zsók (Zahorecz 46.), Lelkes (Pavlovic 54.) – O. Kovács (Oláh 54.), Horváth – Bőle (Peric 60.), Scepanovic (Kulcsár 46.), Lipusz – Pavicevic. Coach: Tibor Sisa.
- BFC Siófok: Szalma – Graszl (Fehér 50.), Ludánszki, Pécseli, Horváth – Piller, Kecskés (Ivancsics 72.), Kocsis, Tóth – Homma (Délczeg 72.), Thiago (Varga 90.). Coach: István Mihalecz.
- G.: Thiago (12.), Homma (65.), Kecskés (67.)
- Y.: Pavicevic (33.) – Graszl (33.)
