= 2009–10 Ferencvárosi TC season =

Ferencvárosi TC
2008–09 season
- Chairman: György Rieb
- Manager: Bobby Davidson (until 30 October 2009); Craig Short
- Stadium: Üllői úti stadion
- Hungarian Cup: Round of 64
- Hungarian League Cup: Second group stage

The 2009–10 season will be Ferencvárosi TC's 105th competitive season, 1st consecutive season in the Borsodi Liga and 110th year in existence as a football club.

== Transfers ==
=== Summer ===
In: Note: Flags indicate national team as defined under FIFA eligibility rules; some limited exceptions apply. Players may hold more than one non-FIFA nationality.

No.	Pos.	Nation	Player
3	DF	ESP	Carlos Alcántara (from (Spain) Atlético Ciudad)
5	DF	ESP	Joaquín Pastor (from (Spain) Atlético Ciudad)
7	MF	PAK	Adnan Ahmed (from (England) Tranmere Rovers)
11	FW	SRB	Bojan Mamić (from (Lithuania) Kaunas)
20	MF	HUN	Dénes Rósa (from (Scotland) Hibernian)
23	GK	MLT	Justin Haber (from (England) Sheffield United)
31	MF	USA	Carlos Diaz (loan return from Tököl)
88	MF	HUN	Dávid Kulcsár (loan return from Vecsés)

Out: Note: Flags indicate national team as defined under FIFA eligibility rules; some limited exceptions apply. Players may hold more than one non-FIFA nationality.

No.	Pos.	Nation	Player
5	DF	SVK	Igor Szkukalek (to Vecsés)
8	MF	SRB	Bojan Lazić (to Soproni VSE)
9	FW	HUN	Tibor Márkus (loan return to Paks)
11	MF	JAM	Wolry Wolfe (loan return to (Trinidad and Tobago) Joe Public)
18	GK	TTO	Jan-Michael Williams (to (Trinidad and Tobago) W Connection)
19	DF	HUN	Tibor Baranyai (loan return to Fehérvár)
23	MF	HUN	Imre Deme (to Tatabánya)
31	MF	USA	Carlos Diaz (to (Trinidad and Tobago) W Connection)
38	MF	CIV	Bamba Moussa (to (Malta) Sannat Lions)
40	MF	CIV	Dramane Kamaté (to (Spain) Racing Ferrol)
79	MF	GUI	Lamine Kourouma (to (Morocco) Hassania Agadir)
93	FW	ENG	Jordan Robertson (loan return to (England) Sheffield United)

=== Winter ===
In: Note: Flags indicate national team as defined under FIFA eligibility rules; some limited exceptions apply. Players may hold more than one non-FIFA nationality.

No.	Pos.	Nation	Player
—	DF	SRB	Đorđe Tutorić (from (Serbia) Crvena Zvezda)
—	MF	NIR	Tommy Doherty (from (England) Wycombe Wanderers)
—	DF	HUN	Csaba Csizmadia (from (Croatia) Slaven Belupo)
—	FW	MLT	André Schembri (from Austria Kärnten)
—	FW	ENG	Anthony Elding (from (England) Crewe Alexandra)
—	DF	ENG	Sam Stockley (from (England) Port Vale)

Out: Note: Flags indicate national team as defined under FIFA eligibility rules; some limited exceptions apply. Players may hold more than one non-FIFA nationality.

No.	Pos.	Nation	Player
8	MF	ENG	James Ashmore (to (England) Worksop Town)
14	DF	ENG	Matthew Lowton (loan return to (England) Sheffield United)
16	GK	HUN	Ádám Holczer (to Kecskemét)
17	MF	ENG	Sam Wedgbury (loan return to (England) Sheffield United)
21	MF	HUN	Norbert Zsivóczky (to Diósgyőr)
29	DF	HUN	Noel Fülöp (loan to Szigetszentmiklós)
36	FW	CAN	Igor Pisanjuk (loan to Szolnok)
60	FW	HUN	Péter Pölöskei (loan to Rákospalota)
82	DF	HUN	Zoltán Csiszár (to Békéscsaba)

== Competitions ==
=== Overview ===
Competition	First match	Last match	Starting round	Final position	Record							
Competition	First match	Last match	Starting round	Final position	Pld	W	D	L	GF	GA	GD	Win %
Nemzeti Bajnokság I	26 August 2009	TBA	Matchday 1	TBA	25	7	11	7	27	29	−2	28.00
Hungarian Cup	16 September 2009	16 September 2009	Round of 64	Round of 64	1	0	0	1	0	2	−2	0.00
League Cup	22 July 2009	6 April 2010	First group stage	Second group stage	16	8	3	5	26	23	+3	50.00
Total					42	15	14	13	53	54	−1	35.71

Last updated: 2 May 2010
Source: Competitions

=== Nemzeti Bajnokság I ===
==== League table ====
Pos	Team	Pld	W	D	L	GF	GA	GD	Pts	Qualification or relegation
5	Zalaegerszeg	30	15	8	7	59	45	+14	53	Qualification for Europa League first qualifying round (Note: Since the winners of the 2009–10 Magyar Kupa, Debrecen, qualified for the Champions League, the spot given to the Magyar Kupa winners (Europa League first qualifying round) was passed to the losing finalists.)
6	MTK	30	12	7	11	52	41	+11	43	
7	Ferencváros	30	10	11	9	34	35	−1	41	
8	Haladás	30	10	9	11	46	49	−3	39	
9	Honvéd	30	9	11	10	38	35	+3	38	

Source: soccerway.com
Rules for classification: 1st points; 2nd overall wins; 3rd goal difference; 4th goals scored

==== Results summary ====
Overall								Home						Away					
Pld	W	D	L	GF	GA	GD	Pts	W	D	L	GF	GA	GD	W	D	L	GF	GA	GD
25	7	11	7	27	29	−2	32	5	6	2	14	11	+3	2	5	5	13	18	−5

Last updated: 2 May 2010.
Source: Soccerway

==== Results by round ====
Round	1	2	3	4	5	6	7	8	9	10	11	12	13	14	15	16	17	18	19	20	21	22	23	24	25	26	27	28	29	30
Ground	A	H	A	H	A	A	H	A	H	A	H	A	H	A	H	H	A	H	A	H	H	A	H	A	H					
Result	D	W	L	D	L	D	W	L	D	L	W	L	L	W	D	W	D	D	W	D	D	D	W	D	L					
Position	7	3	7	9	13	14	9	9	11	12	10	11	12	11	11	9	9	9	9	9	9	9	8	7	8					

Updated to match(es) played on 2 May 2010. Source: Matches
A = Away; H = Home; W = Win; D = Draw; L = Loss

==== Matches ====
26 August 2009 1	Szombathelyi Haladás	0–0	Ferencváros	Szombathely
19:00 CEST		Report		Stadium: Rohonci úti Stadion; Attendance: 9,000; Referee: Viktor Kassai

1 August 2009 2	Ferencváros	4–1	Zalaegerszeg	Budapest
20:00 CEST	Shaw 15'; Dragóner 34'; Pölöskei 78', 86'	Report	Máté 45'; Sluka (red card) 88'	Stadium: Albert Flórián Stadion; Attendance: 12,000; Referee: Péter Solymosi

7 August 2009 3	Nyíregyháza	3–1	Ferencváros	Nyíregyháza
19:00 CEST	Dosso 14'; Honma 33', 65'	Report	Wedgbury 54'	Stadium: Városi Stadion; Attendance: 10,300; Referee: Tamás Arany

15 August 2009 4	Ferencváros	1–1	Paks	Budapest
20:00 CEST	Ashmore 48'	Report	Lisztes 69'	Stadium: Albert Flórián Stadion; Attendance: 9,100; Referee: Zsolt Szabó

21 August 2009 5	Vasas	3–2	Ferencváros	Budapest
19:00 CEST	Divić 38'; Lázok 49', 66'	Report	Rósa 53'; Pastor 62'	Stadium: Illovszky Rudolf Stadion; Attendance: 4,000; Referee: Ferenc Bede

29 August 2009 6	Kaposvár	0–0	Ferencváros	Kaposvár
17:30 CEST		Report		Stadium: Rákóczi Stadion; Attendance: 6,000; Referee: Zoltán Iványi

13 September 2009 7	Ferencváros	2–1	MTK Budapest	Budapest
20:00 CEST	Ferenczi 30'; Rósa 36'	Report	Lencse 54'	Stadium: Albert Flórián Stadion; Attendance: 8,000; Referee: Sándor Andó-Szabó

20 September 2009 8	Debrecen	2–1	Ferencváros	Debrecen
17:30 CEST	Szakály 51'; Coulibaly 72'	Report	Ferenczi 20'; Megyeri (red card) 90+1'	Stadium: Oláh Gábor utcai Stadion; Attendance: 9,500; Referee: Péter Solymosi

25 September 2009 9	Ferencváros	2–2	Videoton	Budapest
19:00 CEST	Ferenczi 67'; Wolfe 88'	Report	Polonkai 36'; Sitku 60'	Stadium: Albert Flórián Stadion; Attendance: 7,000; Referee: Ferenc Bede

3 October 2009 10	Újpest	2–1	Ferencváros	Budapest
17:30 CEST	Kabát 43'; Rajczi 88'	Report	Fitos 42'	Stadium: Szusza Ferenc Stadion; Attendance: 11,763; Referee: Viktor Kassai

4 November 2009 11	Ferencváros	1–0	Győr	Budapest
19:00 CET	Ferenczi 43'	Report		Stadium: Albert Flórián Stadion; Attendance: on closed Referee: Zoltán Iványi

24 October 2009 12	Kecskemét	3–1	Ferencváros	Kecskemét
17:30 CEST	Litsingi 27', 64'; Montvai 54'	Report	Ferenczi 60'	Stadium: Széktói Stadion; Attendance: 7,000; Referee: Roland Veizer

31 October 2009 13	Ferencváros	0–3	Diósgyőr	Budapest
17:30 CET	Tóth 62'	Report	Huszák 17'; Jeknić 48'; Lippai 56'	Stadium: Albert Flórián Stadion; Attendance: 6,000; Referee: Gergely Sulyok
Note: The match was interrupted in the 69th minute due to fan disorder. The 3 points of the match were awarded to Diósgyőr with a 3-0 goal difference.

7 November 2009 14	Pápa	0–1	Ferencváros	Pápa
17:30 CEST		Report	Wolfe 71'	Stadium: Perutz Stadion; Attendance: 5,500; Referee: Tamás Arany

13 November 2009 15	Ferencváros	0–0	Budapest Honvéd	Budapest
19:00 CET		Report		Stadium: Albert Flórián Stadion; Attendance: on closed Referee: Péter Solymosi

27 February 2010 16	Ferencváros	2–1	Szombathelyi Haladás	Budapest
15:00 CET	Ferenczi 45' (pen.); Elding 88'	Report	Halmosi 31'	Stadium: Albert Flórián Stadion; Attendance: on closed Referee: Sándor Andó-Szabó

6 March 2010 17	Zalaegerszeg	3–3	Ferencváros	Zalaegerszeg
15:00 CET	Pavićević 54'; Illés 81'; Miljatović 87'	Report	Elding 1', 38'; Todorović 47' (o.g.); Dragóner (red card) 56'; Morrison (red card) 71'	Stadium: ZTE Arena; Attendance: 7,346; Referee: Zsolt Szabó

12 March 2010 18	Ferencváros	0–0	Nyíregyháza	Budapest
19:00 CET		Report	Nánási (red card) 90+2'	Stadium: Albert Flórián Stadion; Attendance: 4,000; Referee: Viktor Kassai

20 March 2010 19	Paks	1–2	Ferencváros	Paks
17:30 CET	Vayer 41'	Report	Elding 34'; Ferenczi 50'	Stadium: Fehérvári úti Stadion; Attendance: 6,000; Referee: Péter Solymosi

28 March 2010 20	Ferencváros	1–1	Vasas	Budapest
17:30 CET	Elding 83'	Report	Benounes 73' (pen.)	Stadium: Albert Flórián Stadion; Attendance: 4,000; Referee: Tamás Bognár

3 April 2010 21	Ferencváros	0–0	Kaposvár	Budapest
17:30 CEST		Report		Stadium: Albert Flórián Stadion; Attendance: 2,742; Referee: József Berger

10 April 2010 22	MTK Budapest	1–1	Ferencváros	Budapest
17:30 CEST	Szatmári 57'	Report	Elding 26'	Stadium: Hidegkuti Nándor Stadion; Attendance: 3,500; Referee: Ferenc Bede

16 April 2010 23	Ferencváros	1–0	Debrecen	Budapest
19:00 CEST	Tóth 69'	Report		Stadium: Albert Flórián Stadion; Attendance: 5,500; Referee: Mihály Fábián

24 April 2010 24	Videoton	0–0	Ferencváros	Széákesfehérvár
17:30 CEST		Report		Stadium: Sóstói Stadion; Attendance: 9,000; Referee: Ferenc Bede

30 April 2010 25	Ferencváros	0–1	Újpest	Budapest
19:00 CEST		Report	Kabát 35'	Stadium: Albert Flórián Stadion; Attendance: 10,000; Referee: Viktor Kassai

=== Hungarian Cup ===
16 September 2009 Round of 64	MTK Budapest II	2–0	Ferencváros	Budapest
CEST	Nagy 49'; Molnár 75'	Report		Stadium: Hidegkuti Nándor Stadion; Attendance: 800; Referee: József Erdős

=== League Cup ===
==== First Group Stage ====
===== Table =====
Team	Pld	W	D	L	GF	GA	GD	Pts
Ferencváros	10	7	0	3	21	15	+6	21
Nyíregyháza	10	5	2	3	28	13	+15	17
Vasas	10	5	0	5	21	23	−2	15
MTK Budapest	10	3	4	3	15	16	−1	13
Kecskemét	10	3	3	4	16	21	−5	12
Diósgyőr	10	2	1	7	13	26	−13	7

===== Matches =====
22 July 2009 1	Kecskemét	0–3	Ferencváros	Kecskemét
CEST		Report	Dragóner 3', 31'; Ferenczi 54'	Stadium: Széktói Stadion; Attendance: 700; Referee: Roland Veizer

29 July 2009 2	Ferencváros	2–0	Diósgyőr	Budapest
CEST	Ferenczi 50', 67'	Report		Stadium: Albert Flórián Stadion; Attendance: 2,000; Referee: Gergely Sulyok

4 August 2009 3	Ferencváros	4–0	Nyíregyháza	Budapest
CEST	Pisanjuk 11'; Rósa 20', 32', 35'	Report		Stadium: Albert Flórián Stadion; Attendance: 2,500; Referee: Mihály Fábián

19 August 2009 4	MTK Budapest	0–1	Ferencváros	Budapest
CEST		Report	Tóth 72'	Stadium: Hidegkuti Nándor Stadion; Attendance: 200; Referee: Tamás Bognár

11 August 2009 5	Ferencváros	2–1	Vasas	Budapest
CEST	Pisanjuk 13'; Rósa 36'	Report		Stadium: Albert Flórián Stadion; Attendance: 1,500; Referee: János Takács

23 August 2009 6	Ferencváros	4–2	Kecskemét	Budapest
CEST	Mamić 11', 50'; Pisanjuk 23'; Ahmed 30'	Report	Veselič 9'; Rakič 45'	Stadium: Albert Flórián Stadion; Attendance: 1,000; Referee: Tamás Bognár

4 November 2009 7	Diósgyőr	3–0	Ferencváros	Miskolc
CET	Szabó 16'; Apostu 33', 53'	Report		Stadium: Diósgyőri Stadion; Attendance: 400; Referee: Ádám Farkas

11 November 2009 8	Nyíregyháza	3–4	Ferencváros	Nyíregyháza
CET	Bouguerra 36', 42', 45'	Report	Takács 9'; Ashmore 22'; Nyilasi 50'; Pisanjuk 56'	Stadium: Városi Stadion; Attendance: 300; Referee: Róbert Nagy

28 November 2009 9	Ferencváros	1–3	MTK Budapest	Budapest
CET	Kulcsár 17'	Report	Zsidai 11'; Gosztonyi 41'; Busai 83'	Stadium: Albert Flórián Stadion; Attendance: on closed Referee: Balázs Böcskei

25 November 2009 10	Vasas	3–0	Ferencváros	Budapest
CET	Mundi 7'; Divić 71'; Szűcs 81'	Report		Stadium: Illovszky Rudolf Stadion; Attendance: 300; Referee: Zoltán J. Kovács

==== Second Group Stage ====
===== Table =====
Team	Pld	W	D	L	GF	GA	GD	Pts
Paks	6	3	3	0	9	6	+3	12
Szombathelyi Haladás	6	1	3	2	9	9	0	6
Újpest	6	1	3	2	6	6	0	6
Ferencváros	6	1	3	2	5	8	−3	6

===== Matches =====
23 March 2010 1	Szombathelyi Haladás	4–1	Ferencváros	Szombathely
CET	Kenesei 44'; Simon 53'; Irhás 66'; Skriba 79'	Report	Lipcsei 65'; Pastor (red card) 88'	Stadium: Rohonci úti Stadion; Attendance: 300; Referee: Szabolcs Szilasi

20 April 2010 2	Ferencváros	0–0	Újpest	Budapest
CEST		Report		Stadium: Albert Flórián Stadion; Attendance: 500; Referee: János Takács

9 March 2010 3	Paks	1–1	Ferencváros	Paks
CET	Böde 65'	Report	Tóth 63'; Morrison (red card) 44'	Stadium: Fehérvári úti Stadion; Attendance: 700; Referee: Zoltán Iványi

16 March 2010 4	Ferencváros	1–1	Szombathelyi Haladás	Budapest
CET	Wolfe 39'	Report	Iszlai 90'	Stadium: Albert Flórián Stadion; Attendance: 200; Referee: János Takács

31 March 2010 5	Újpest	0–1	Ferencváros	Budapest
CEST		Report	Tóth 55'	Stadium: Szusza Ferenc Stadion; Attendance: 400; Referee: Ádám Farkas

6 April 2010 6	Ferencváros	1–2	Paks	Budapest
CEST	Shaw 74'	Report	Bartha 47'; Kiss 54'	Stadium: Albert Flórián Stadion; Attendance: 500; Referee: Ádám Németh

== Statistics ==
=== Appearances and goals ===
Last updated on 2 May 2010.

No.	Pos	Nat	Player	Total		Nemzeti Bajnokság I		Hungarian Cup		League Cup	
No.	Pos	Nat	Player	Apps	Goals	Apps	Goals	Apps	Goals	Apps	Goals
3	DF	(Spain) ESP	Carlos Alcántara	17	0	6	0	1	0	10	0
5	DF	(Spain) ESP	Joaquín Pastor	20	1	9	1	1	0	10	0
6	MF	(Hungary) HUN	Péter Lipcsei	31	1	20	0	0	0	11	1
7	MF	(Pakistan) PAK	Adnan Ahmed	17	1	11	0	0	0	6	1
9	FW	(England) ENG	Anthony Elding	11	6	10	6	0	0	1	0
10	FW	(England) ENG	Paul Shaw	16	2	8	1	1	0	7	1
11	FW	(Serbia) SRB	Bojan Mamić	12	2	4	0	1	0	7	2
13	FW	(Hungary) HUN	István Ferenczi	28	10	25	7	1	0	2	3
14	MF	(Northern Ireland) NIR	Tommy Doherty	9	0	9	0	0	0	0	0
15	DF	(Serbia) SRB	Đorđe Tutorić	9	0	9	0	0	0	0	0
19	MF	(Norway) NOR	Liban Abdi	10	0	5	0	1	0	4	0
20	MF	(Hungary) HUN	Dénes Rósa	24	6	21	2	0	0	3	4
23	GK	(Malta) MLT	Justin Haber	9	-14	2	-4	0	-0	7	-10
25	MF	(Jamaica) JAM	Jason Morrison	23	0	21	0	1	0	1	0
26	DF	(Hungary) HUN	Attila Dragóner	19	3	12	1	0	0	7	2
27	FW	(Malta) MLT	André Schembri	10	0	4	0	0	0	6	0
30	MF	(Hungary) HUN	Bence Tóth	23	5	13	2	0	0	10	3
32	DF	(England) ENG	Sam Stockley	11	0	10	0	0	0	1	0
39	DF	(Jamaica) JAM	Rafe Wolfe	23	3	18	2	1	0	4	1
42	GK	(Hungary) HUN	Balázs Megyeri	22	-18	19	-17	0	-0	3	-1
78	DF	(Hungary) HUN	Zoltán Balog	23	0	20	0	0	0	3	0
85	DF	(Hungary) HUN	Csaba Csizmadia	11	0	10	0	0	0	1	0
87	MF	(Hungary) HUN	László Fitos	12	1	10	1	1	0	1	0
88	MF	(Hungary) HUN	Dávid Kulcsár	27	1	20	0	0	0	7	1
Youth players:
4	DF	(Hungary) HUN	Dániel Sváb	13	0	0	0	0	0	13	0
8	MF	(Hungary) HUN	Péter Gold	4	0	0	0	0	0	4	0
15	DF	(England) ENG	Cory Sinnott	4	0	0	0	0	0	4	0
17	MF	(Hungary) HUN	Roland Szabó	8	0	0	0	0	0	8	0
18	FW	(China) CHN	Men Yang	5	0	0	0	0	0	5	0
19	DF	(Hungary) HUN	Gábor Horváth	1	0	0	0	0	0	1	0
20	MF	(Hungary) HUN	Renátó Takács	5	1	0	0	0	0	5	1
22	GK	(Hungary) HUN	Bence Hermány	1	-3	0	-0	0	-0	1	-3
24	FW	(Hungary) HUN	Bálint Nyilasi	9	1	0	0	0	0	9	1
28	FW	(Hungary) HUN	István Kovács	7	0	0	0	0	0	7	0
33	DF	(Hungary) HUN	Balázs Vattai	6	0	0	0	0	0	6	0
39	MF	(Hungary) HUN	Máté Papp	7	0	0	0	0	0	7	0
51	MF	(Hungary) HUN	Máté Vass	13	0	0	0	0	0	13	0
70	GK	(Hungary) HUN	László Komora	1	-3	0	-0	0	-0	1	-3
	DF	(Hungary) HUN	Dániel Sajó	1	0	0	0	0	0	1	0
	MF	(Hungary) HUN	Péter Bogáti	1	0	0	0	0	0	1	0
	MF	(Hungary) HUN	Attila Bors	0	0	0	0	0	0	0	0
	FW	(Hungary) HUN	Ákos Forrás	0	0	0	0	0	0	0	0
	MF	(Hungary) HUN	Viktor Peszmeg	2	0	0	0	0	0	2	0
	MF	(Hungary) HUN	András Gárdos	1	0	0	0	0	0	1	0
	MF	(Hungary) HUN	Viktor Bölcsföldi	1	0	0	0	0	0	1	0
Out to loan:
29	DF	(Hungary) HUN	Noel Fülöp	10	0	3	0	0	0	7	0
36	FW	(Canada) CAN	Igor Pisanjuk	9	4	3	0	1	0	5	4
60	FW	(Hungary) HUN	Péter Pölöskei	11	2	4	2	1	0	6	0
Players no longer at the club:
8	MF	(England) ENG	James Ashmore	17	2	13	1	1	0	3	1
14	DF	(England) ENG	Matthew Lowton	7	0	5	0	0	0	2	0
16	GK	(Hungary) HUN	Ádám Holczer	9	-16	4	-8	1	-2	4	-6
17	MF	(England) ENG	Sam Wedgbury	8	1	6	1	0	0	2	0
82	DF	(Hungary) HUN	Zoltán Csiszár	4	0	0	0	1	0	3	0

=== Top scorers ===
Includes all competitive matches. The list is sorted by shirt number when total goals are equal.

Last updated on 2 May 2010

Position	Nation	Number	Name	Nemzeti Bajnokság I	Hungarian Cup	League Cup	Total
1	(Hungary)	13	István Ferenczi	7	0	3	10
2	(England)	9	Anthony Elding	6	0	0	6
3	(Hungary)	20	Dénes Rósa	2	0	4	6
4	(Hungary)	30	Bence Tóth	2	0	3	5
5	(Canada)	36	Igor Pisanjuk	0	0	4	4
6	(Jamaica)	39	Rafe Wolfe	2	0	1	3
7	(Hungary)	26	Attila Dragóner	1	0	2	3
8	(Hungary)	60	Péter Pölöskei	2	0	0	2
9	(England)	8	James Ashmore	1	0	1	2
10	(England)	10	Paul Shaw	1	0	1	2
11	(Serbia)	11	Bojan Mamić	0	0	2	2
12	(England)	17	Sam Wedgbury	1	0	0	1
13	(Spain)	5	Joaquín Pastor	1	0	0	1
14	(Hungary)	87	László Fitos	1	0	0	1
15	(Pakistan)	7	Adnan Ahmed	0	0	1	1
16	(Hungary)	20	Renátó Takács	0	0	1	1
17	(Hungary)	24	Bálint Nyilasi	0	0	1	1
18	(Hungary)	88	Dávid Kulcsár	0	0	1	1
19	(Hungary)	6	Péter Lipcsei	0	0	1	1
/	/	/	Own Goals	1	0	0	1
			TOTALS	28	0	26	54

=== Disciplinary record ===
Includes all competitive matches. Players with 1 card or more included only.

Last updated on 2 May 2010

Position	Nation	Number	Name	Nemzeti Bajnokság I		Hungarian Cup		League Cup		Total (Hu Total)	
Position	Nation	Number	Name	Yellow card	Red card	Yellow card	Red card	Yellow card	Red card	Yellow card	Red card
DF	(Spain)	3	Carlos Alcántara	1	0	0	0	1	0	2 (1)	0 (0)
DF	(Hungary)	4	Dániel Sváb	0	0	0	0	3	0	3 (0)	0 (0)
DF	(Spain)	5	Joaquín Pastor	0	0	0	0	0	1	0 (0)	1 (0)
MF	(Hungary)	6	Péter Lipcsei	1	0	0	0	1	0	2 (1)	0 (0)
MF	(Pakistan)	7	Adnan Ahmed	2	0	0	0	1	0	3 (2)	0 (0)
MF	(England)	8	James Ashmore	3	0	0	0	0	0	3 (3)	0 (0)
FW	(England)	9	Anthony Elding	4	0	0	0	0	0	4 (4)	0 (0)
FW	(England)	10	Paul Shaw	1	0	0	0	0	0	1 (1)	0 (0)
FW	(Hungary)	13	István Ferenczi	4	0	0	0	2	0	6 (4)	0 (0)
MF	(Northern Ireland)	14	Tommy Doherty	4	0	0	0	0	0	4 (4)	0 (0)
DF	(England)	14	Matthew Lowton	0	0	0	0	2	0	2 (0)	0 (0)
DF	(Serbia)	15	Đorđe Tutorić	2	0	0	0	0	0	2 (2)	0 (0)
DF	(England)	15	Cory Sinnott	0	0	0	0	1	0	1 (0)	0 (0)
GK	(Hungary)	16	Dávid Holczer	0	0	0	0	1	0	1 (0)	0 (0)
MF	(England)	17	Sam Wedgbury	3	0	0	0	0	0	3 (3)	0 (0)
MF	(Norway)	19	Liban Abdi	1	0	0	0	1	0	2 (1)	0 (0)
MF	(Hungary)	20	Dénes Rósa	2	0	0	0	0	0	2 (2)	0 (0)
MF	(Hungary)	20	András Gárdos	0	0	0	0	1	0	1 (0)	0 (0)
GK	(Malta)	23	Justin Haber	0	0	0	0	2	0	2 (0)	0 (0)
MF	(Jamaica)	25	Jason Morrison	4	1	0	0	0	1	4 (4)	2 (1)
DF	(Hungary)	26	Attila Dragóner	3	1	0	0	2	0	5 (3)	1 (1)
DF	(Hungary)	29	Noel Fülöp	0	0	0	0	1	0	1 (0)	0 (0)
MF	(Hungary)	30	Bence Tóth	5	0	0	0	2	0	7 (5)	0 (0)
DF	(England)	32	Sam Stockley	2	0	0	0	0	0	2 (2)	0 (0)
DF	(Hungary)	33	Balázs Vattai	0	0	0	0	2	0	2 (0)	0 (0)
FW	(Canada)	36	Igor Pisanjuk	1	0	0	0	1	0	2 (1)	0 (0)
DF	(Jamaica)	39	Rafe Wolfe	3	0	1	0	3	0	7 (3)	0 (0)
GK	(Hungary)	42	Balázs Megyeri	0	1	0	0	0	0	0 (0)	1 (1)
MF	(Hungary)	51	Máté Vass	0	0	0	0	2	0	2 (0)	0 (0)
FW	(Hungary)	60	Péter Pölöskei	0	0	0	0	1	0	1 (0)	0 (0)
DF	(Hungary)	78	Zoltán Balog	4	0	0	0	0	0	4 (4)	0 (0)
DF	(Hungary)	85	Csaba Csizmadia	5	0	0	0	1	0	6 (5)	0 (0)
MF	(Hungary)	87	László Fitos	1	0	0	0	0	0	1 (1)	0 (0)
MF	(Hungary)	88	Dávid Kulcsár	5	0	0	0	0	0	5 (5)	0 (0)
			TOTALS	62	3	1	0	31	2	94 (62)	5 (3)

=== Clean sheets ===
Last updated on 2 May 2010

Position	Nation	Number	Name	Nemzeti Bajnokság I	Hungarian Cup	League Cup	Total
1	(Hungary)	42	Balázs Megyeri	9	0	2	11
2	(Hungary)	16	Ádám Holczer	0	0	2	2
3	(Malta)	23	Justin Haber	0	0	2	2
4	(Hungary)	22	Bence Hermány	0	0	0	0
5	(Hungary)	70	László Komora	0	0	0	0
			TOTALS	9	0	6	15
