= Veselic =

Veselic (Slovene: Veselič; Serbo-Croatian: Veselić) is a surname. Notable people with the surname include:

- Bob Veselic (1955–1995), American baseball player
- Stjepan Veselic (born 1974), Dutch kickboxer
- Uroš Veselič (born 1987), Slovenian footballer
