= Craig Short =

English footballer (born 1968)

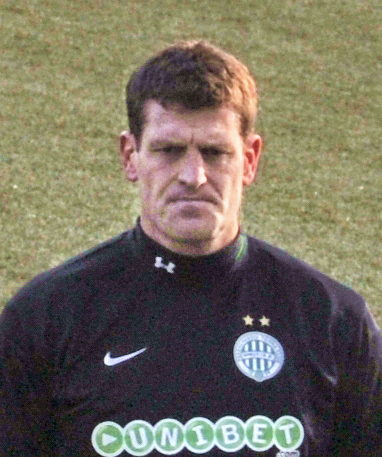
- Short with Ferencváros in 2008

Personal information
- Full name: Craig Jonathan Short
- Date of birth: 25 June 1968 (age 58)
- Place of birth: Bridlington, East Riding of Yorkshire, England
- Height: 6 ft 3 in (1.91 m)
- Position: Centre-back

Youth career
- 1986–1987: Pickering Town

Senior career*
Years	Team	Apps	(Gls)
1987–1989	Scarborough	63	(7)
1989–1992	Notts County	128	(6)
1992–1995	Derby County	118	(9)
1995–1999	Everton	99	(4)
1999–2005	Blackburn Rovers	134	(4)
2005–2007	Sheffield United	23	(0)
2008	Ferencváros	0	(0)
Total		565	(30)

Managerial career
- 2009–2010: Ferencváros
- 2010: Notts County
- 2023: Oxford United (caretaker)
- 2023: Oxford United (caretaker)
- 2025–2026: Oxford United (caretaker)
- * Club domestic league appearances and goals

Craig Jonathan Short (born 25 June 1968) is an English former professional footballer who played as a centre-back.

== Playing career ==
Short was born in Bridlington, East Riding of Yorkshire, and after attending Amotherby primary school and Lady Lumley's School (Pickering) along with his brother Chris, he started his professional career at Pickering Town in the 1986–87 season. In October the following year they moved to Scarborough together, and in June 1989, Notts County together. However, while his brother was dogged by injury, Craig managed to ascend to greater things.

After four seasons for Notts County he moved to Derby County at the beginning of the 1992–93 season. He signed for £2.5million – a record for a club outside the top flight, and the highest fee for a defender at the time. He had been subject of a similarly high bid for ambitious Premier League side Blackburn Rovers, but opted to join Derby instead.

He completed more than 100 competitive games for both Derby and his next club, Everton who he joined three seasons later. He left the Merseyside club in 1999, joining Blackburn Rovers for £1.7 million – seven years after they had first tried to buy him.

Short endeared himself to fans as a mainstay in the 2000–01 team which won promotion and established itself back in the top flight.

However, he missed the 2002 League Cup final against Tottenham Hotspur through suspension, a match which Blackburn won 2–1. He did gain European experience in the following season, playing two games in the UEFA Cup.

After a 4–0 victory away to Birmingham City on 6 December 2003, manager Graeme Souness labelled Short the "perfect professional" after outplaying City striker Christophe Dugarry, who was sent off for elbowing Short.

In his final league game for Rovers on 7 May 2005 against Fulham, Short was handed the captain's armband by then manager Mark Hughes. However, in an out of character incident, he was sent off for violent conduct against Fulham's Luis Boa Morte after the Portuguese striker dangerously fouled Lucas Neill and Short pushed Boa Morte in the chest. He did however lead the team out for one final time a few weeks later in Tony Parkes' testimonial match, who was also leaving the club.

In the summer of 2005 he was allowed to move on to Sheffield United and was an important member of United's successful promotion campaign. He signed a one-year contract but only made two League Cup appearances that season. He was released at the end of the 2006–07 season and retired from football.

== Managerial career ==
In September 2008, it was announced that Short had joined Sheffield United's sister club, Ferencvaros, as a player-coach to Bobby Davison. He played two games for the club, both in the Hungarian League Cup.

On 30 November 2009, Ferencvaros officially appointed Short as their new manager. However, he left the club at the end of the 2009–10 season because he did not possess the UEFA Pro Licence required in the Hungarian top division.

On 4 June 2010, he was appointed as the new manager of Notts County. He was sacked on 24 October 2010.

After a break from football, Short returned as Head of Recruitment for Derby County's academy. In 2013 Short was appointed first team coach at Blackburn Rovers where he had enjoyed a six-year spell as a player.

Short was appointed to Darren Wassall's coaching staff at Derby County for the closing stages of the 2015–16 campaign.

In August 2020, he was appointed as a coach at Oxford United. Following the departure of Karl Robinson in February 2023, he was appointed caretaker manager. Having overseen two matches in charge, he returned to the coaching staff following the managerial appointment of Liam Manning. He was once again appointed caretaker manager following the departure of Manning to Bristol City in November 2023. The U's won 5–0 against Chelsea U21s in the EFL Trophy in the first game of his second spell, with Short giving a debut to 15 year-old Leo Snowden, who became Oxford's youngest ever player.

In December 2025, Short was appointed caretaker manager again, following the departure of Gary Rowett

== Personal life ==
After retiring as a player, Short began a sailing business on Windermere, teaching sailing to the public and corporate teams, and delivering boats to their owners.

== Career statistics ==
=== Manager ===
As of 9 January 2026

Team	Country	From	To	Record				
Team	Country	From	To	G	W	D	L	Win %
Ferencváros	Hungary	30 November 2009	May 2010	21	9	7	5	42.86
Notts County	England	4 June 2010	24 October 2010	18	8	1	9	44.44
Oxford United (caretaker)	England	26 February 2023	12 March 2023	2	0	0	2	0.00
Oxford United (caretaker)	England	7 November 2023	16 November 2023	2	2	0	0	100.00
Oxford United (caretaker)	England	23 December 2025	9 January 2026	4	1	1	2	25.00
Total				47	20	9	18	42.55

== Honours ==
Notts County

- Football League Second Division play-offs: 1991
- Football League Third Division play-offs: 1990

Individual

- PFA Team of the Year: 1992–93 First Division, 1994–95 First Division
