= Róbert Szepessy =

Hungarian footballer

Personal information
- Full name: Róbert Szepessy
- Date of birth: 12 August 1985 (age 41)
- Place of birth: Budapest, Hungary
- Height: 1.87 m (6 ft 1 1/2 in)
- Position: Midfielder

Team information
- Current team: Szigetszentmiklósi TK

Youth career
- 1999–2004: MTK

Senior career*
Years	Team	Apps	(Gls)
2004–2009	Dunaújváros	59	(7)
2006–2007	→ Soroksár (loan)	13	(2)
2009–2011	Kaposvár	25	(3)
2011–2014	Szolnok	76	(19)
2014–	Szigetszentmiklósi TK	46	(6)
- * Club domestic league appearances and goals

Róbert Szepessy (born 12 August 1985 in Budapest) is a Hungarian football player who currently plays for Szigetszentmiklósi TK.
