= Gabriele Fabris =

Italian football player

Personal information
- Full name: Gabriele Fabris
- Date of birth: April 28, 1988 (age 38)
- Place of birth: Gorizia, Italy
- Height: 1.89 m (6 ft 2 in)
- Position: Defender

Team information
- Current team: Crociati Noceto

Senior career*
Years	Team	Apps	(Gls)
2006–2008	A.S.D. Treviso 2009	1	(0)
2007–2008	→ Rovigo Calcio (loan)	16	(0)
2008–2009	→ U.S. Itala San Marco (loan)	17	(0)
Feb 2010–	Kaposvári Rákóczi FC	7	(0)
2010–2011	Crociati Noceto	23	(1)
- * Club domestic league appearances and goals as of 5 March 2010

Gabriele Fabris (born April 28, 1988 in Gorizia) is an Italian football player who currently plays for Crociati Noceto.
