= Joaquín Pastor =

Spanish footballer

Personal information
- Full name: Joaquín Pastor Martínez
- Date of birth: 26 October 1987 (age 39)
- Place of birth: Alcantarilla, Spain
- Height: 1.75 m (5 ft 9 in)
- Position: Right back

Team information
- Current team: Atlético Pulpileño

Youth career
- Murcia

Senior career*
Years	Team	Apps	(Gls)
2005–2006	Murcia B		
2006–2007	Moratalla		
2007–2009	Atlético Ciudad	36	(0)
2009–2010	Ferencváros	9	(1)
2010–2011	Pontevedra	20	(0)
2011–2012	Lorca Atlético	24	(1)
2012–2013	UCAM Murcia	24	(0)
2013–2016	Orihuela	66	(4)
2016	Torrevieja	7	(0)
2016–2017	Nueva Vanguardia	24	(0)
2017–2018	Estudiantes Murcia	30	(2)
2018–	Atlético Pulpileño	18	(0)
- * Club domestic league appearances and goals as of 23 December 2018

Joaquín Martínez Pastor (born 26 October 1987, in Alcantarilla, Region of Murcia) is a Spanish footballer who plays for CA Pulpileño as a right back.
