= Daniane Jawad =

Moroccan footballer

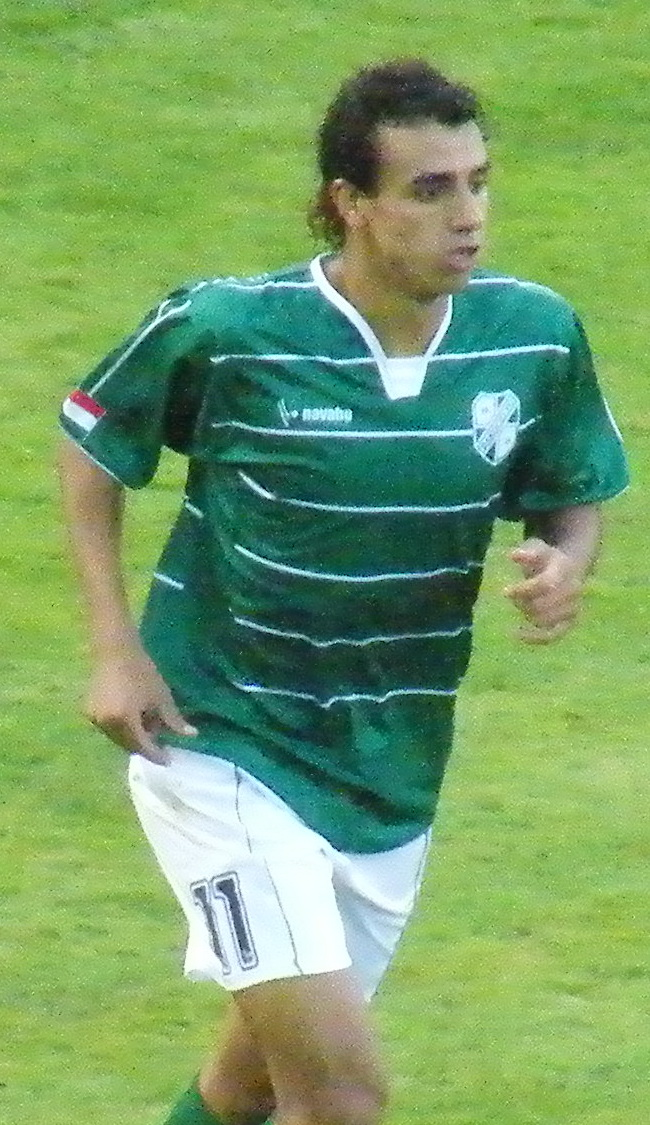

Personal information
- Date of birth: 14 April 1986 (age 40)
- Place of birth: Khouribga, Morocco
- Height: 1.82 m (5 ft 11 1/2 in)
- Positions: Winger; midfielder

Youth career
- 2000: Bologna
- 2000–2003: Perugia
- 2003–2006: Ravenna

Senior career*
| Years | Team | Apps | (Gls) |
| 2006–2008 | Mezzolara | 43 | (7) |
| 2008–2009 | Virtus Castelfranco | 12 | (0) |
| 2009–2010 | Oltrepò | 17 | (3) |
| 2010–2012 | Kaposvári Rákóczi | 29 | (3) |
| 2012 | Mureşul Deva | 6 | (2) |
| 2013 | Viktoria Zizkov | 3 | (0) |
| 2013–2014 | Genoa | 0 | (0) |
| 2015 | Olhanense | 0 | (0) |
| 2015 | Agropoli | 10 | (0) |
| 2016 | IFK Kumla | 18 | (2) |
| 2017 | Pembroke Athleta | 11 | (2) |
| 2017– | Forlì | 0 | (0) |
- * Club domestic league appearances and goals

Daniane Jawad (born 14 April 1986 in Khouribga) is a Moroccan footballer. He currently plays for Slätta SK in Sweden.
