= Bojan Mamić =

Serbian footballer

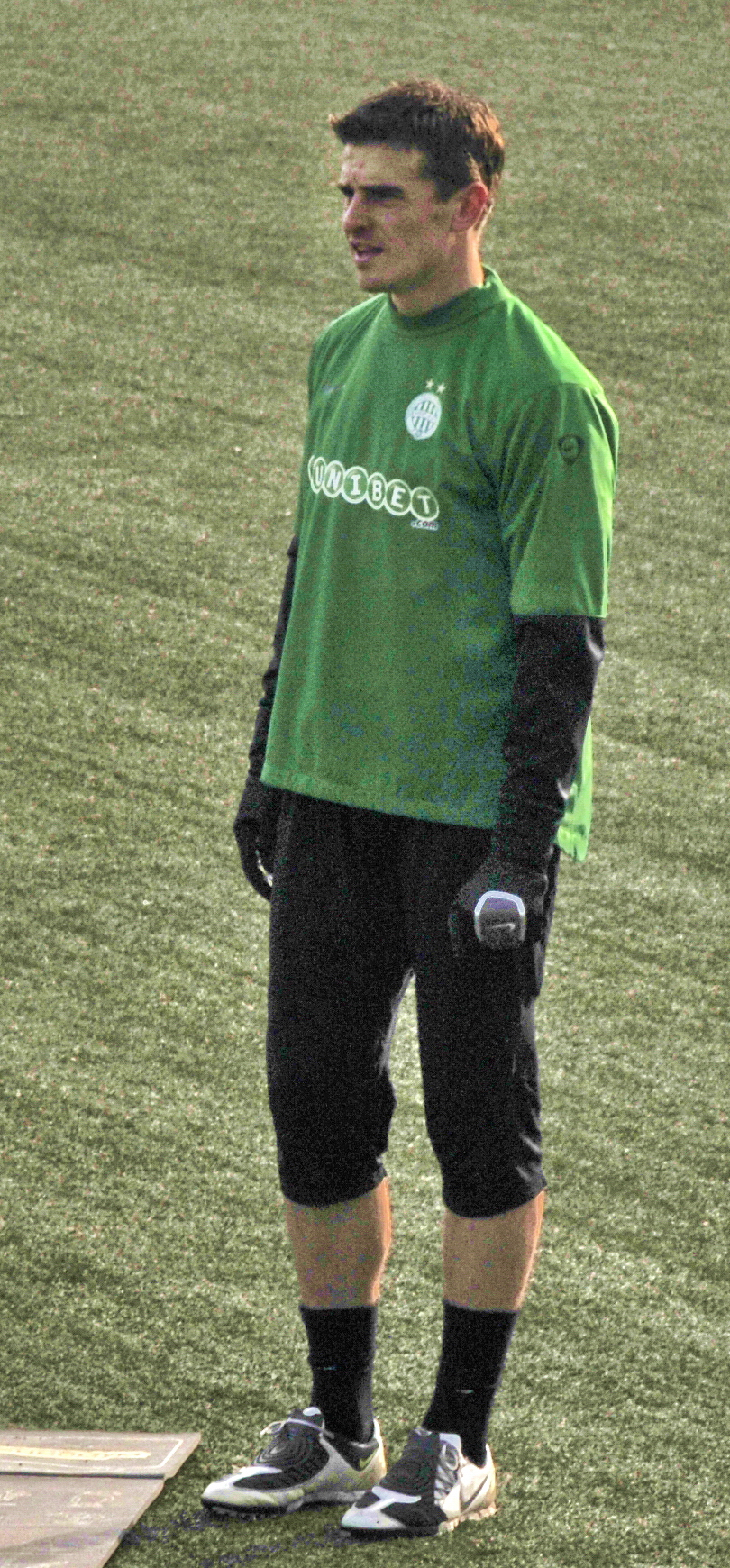

Personal information
- Date of birth: 13 September 1981 (age 45)
- Place of birth: Belgrade, SFR Yugoslavia
- Height: 1.93 m (6 ft 4 in)
- Position: Forward

Youth career
- OFK Beograd

Senior career*
Years	Team	Apps	(Gls)
- Dunavac Grocka
2001–2002	Obilić	0	(0)
2001–2002	→ Mladi Obilić (loan)		
2003	Timok	34	(12)
2004	Rad	9	(0)
2004	Voždovac	18	(1)
2005	Mladenovac	17	(9)
2006–2007	MTZ-RIPO Minsk	36	(6)
2008	Atlantas	12	(4)
2008	FBK Kaunas	7	(1)
2009	Ferencváros	4	(0)
2010	Mladi Radnik	11	(1)
2011	Al-Riffa		
2011–2012	Mqabba	28	(15)
2012	Kaisar	12	(3)
2013	Mladenovac	13	(3)
2013	Krabi		
2014	Da Nang	10	(3)
2014	Żebbuġ Rangers	11	(4)
2015	Mqabba	3	(0)
2016	Parnahyba	0	(0)

International career
- FR Yugoslavia U19
- * Club domestic league appearances and goals as of 31 December 2015

Bojan Mamić (Serbian Cyrillic: Бојан Мамић; born 13 September 1981) is a Serbian retired footballer who most recently played for Parnahyba.

== Club career ==
Mamić represented a number of clubs in the Serbian lower leagues around the city of Belgrade. He was prolific in his goal scoring during this period.

In 2006, Mamić moved away from Serbia for the first time to Minsk, the capital of Belarus. Playing for MTZ-RIPO Minsk, Mamić made 36 appearances and scored 6 goals. He also had his first taste of European competition at MTZ-RIPO Minsk, playing in the UEFA Intertoto Cup as his club attempted to secure a UEFA Europa League place. In those two UEFA Intertoto Cup matches Mamić scored two goals.

Mamić's good form at the Belarusian club saw him transferred to Lithuanian top flight side Atlantas, in 2008. It was a short stay at the Klaipėda club, before he was transferred to another Lithuanian club FBK Kaunas in Lithuania's second city Kaunas. Mamić spent eight eventful months at FBK Kaunas in 2008, and had his first opportunity to play in the UEFA Champions League qualifying matches. FBK Kaunas were eliminated from the competition and were drawn against Italian club U.C. Sampdoria in the knockout rounds of the UEFA Europa League.

Mamić joined Hungarian National Championship I side Ferencváros in July 2009. He later had a short stint in Vietnam with Da Nang and in September 2014 he made his debut for Żebbuġ Rangers in the Maltese Premier League.

Mamić joined Brazilian club Parnahyba after playing for Maltese club Mqabba. Mamić trained with the Parnahyba SC squad in 2016 pre season, but never played a game for them. Instead he decided to retire from football and go ahead with his football academy full time.

In total Mamić played for over 20 clubs during his professional career.

== After Football ==
=== Coaching ===
Mamić holds a UEFA level B Diploma in coaching.

=== Kids United Parnaíba Academy ===
After retiring as a player in 2016, Mamić founded his football academy, in the town of Parnaíba in the North East of Brazil.

The academy is for kids in the 5-17 age range and currently has 150 students, making it the biggest football academy in the town. Mamić coaches them speaking English and Portuguese.

== Personal life ==
Mamić speaks Serbian, English, Portuguese, Spanish and Russian.
