= József Zsók =

Hungarian footballer

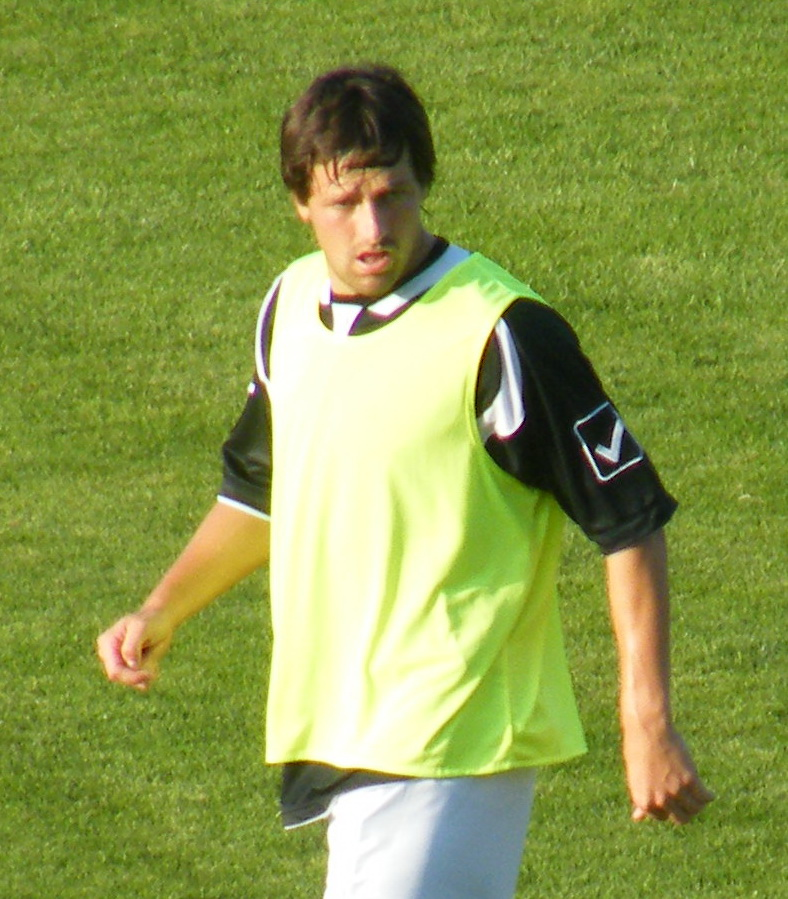

Personal information
- Full name: József Zsók
- Date of birth: 2 October 1984 (age 42)
- Place of birth: Szekszárd, Hungary
- Height: 1.81 m (5 ft 11 1/2 in)
- Position: Defender

Team information
- Current team: Paksi SE
- Number: 33

Youth career
- 1998–2000: Szekszárdi UFC
- 2000–2002: Dunaújváros FC

Senior career*
Years	Team	Apps	(Gls)
2002–2004	Dunaújváros FC	10	(0)
2004–2008	Győri ETO FC	46	(0)
2007	→ Lombard-Pápa TFC (loan)	16	(1)
2008–2010	Bajai LSE	48	(2)
2010–2012	Kaposvári Rákóczi FC	47	(2)
2012–	Paksi SE	1	(0)
- * Club domestic league appearances and goals as of 7 October 2012

József Zsók (born 2 October 1984) is a Hungarian football player who currently plays for Paksi SE.
