= Danijel Ćulum =

Bosnian-Herzegovinian footballer (born 1989)

Personal information
- Date of birth: August 19, 1989 (age 37)
- Place of birth: Zvornik, SFR Yugoslavia
- Height: 1.85 m (6 ft 1 in)
- Position: Midfielder

Senior career*
Years	Team	Apps	(Gls)
2007–2009	Zrinjski Mostar	1	(0)
2009–2010	Drina Zvornik		
2010	Kaposvári Rákóczi	7	(0)
2010–2011	Drina Zvornik	26	(1)
2011–2012	GOŠK Gabela	23	(0)
2012–2013	Radnik Bijeljina	21	(1)
2013–2016	Drina Zvornik	41	(1)
2016	Travnik	4	(0)
2016–2018	Drina Zvornik	50	(8)
2018–2019	Zvijezda 09	18	(1)
- * Club domestic league appearances and goals

Danijel Ćulum (born 19 August 1989) is a Bosnian-Herzegovinian football player.

== Club career ==
His previous clubs include HŠK Zrinjski Mostar, Kaposvári Rákóczi FC, NK GOŠK Gabela and FK Radnik Bijeljina. Ćulum played for Zvijezda 09 in the 2018–19 season, scoring one goal in 18 appearances.
