= Norbert Lipusz =

Hungarian footballer

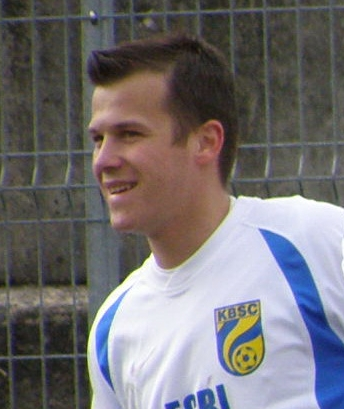

Personal information
- Full name: Norbert Lipusz
- Date of birth: 23 April 1986 (age 40)
- Place of birth: Miskolc, Hungary
- Height: 1.71 m (5 ft 7 1/2 in)
- Position: Midfielder

Team information
- Current team: Kazincbarcika

Youth career
- 2003–2005: Diósgyőr

Senior career*
Years	Team	Apps	(Gls)
2005–2010	Diósgyőr	64	(2)
2007	→ Dunaújváros (loan)	14	(2)
2010	→ Kazincbarcika (loan)	12	(1)
2010–2011	Kaposvár	1	(0)
2011	Kazincbarcika	14	(5)
2011–2013	Mezőkövesd	42	(3)
2013–2014	Cegléd	23	(1)
2014–	Kazincbarcika	18	(3)
- * Club domestic league appearances and goals as of 5 August 2015

Norbert Lipusz (born 23 April 1986 in Miskolc) is a Hungarian football player who currently plays for Ceglédi VSE.
