= Uroš Veselič =

Slovenian footballer

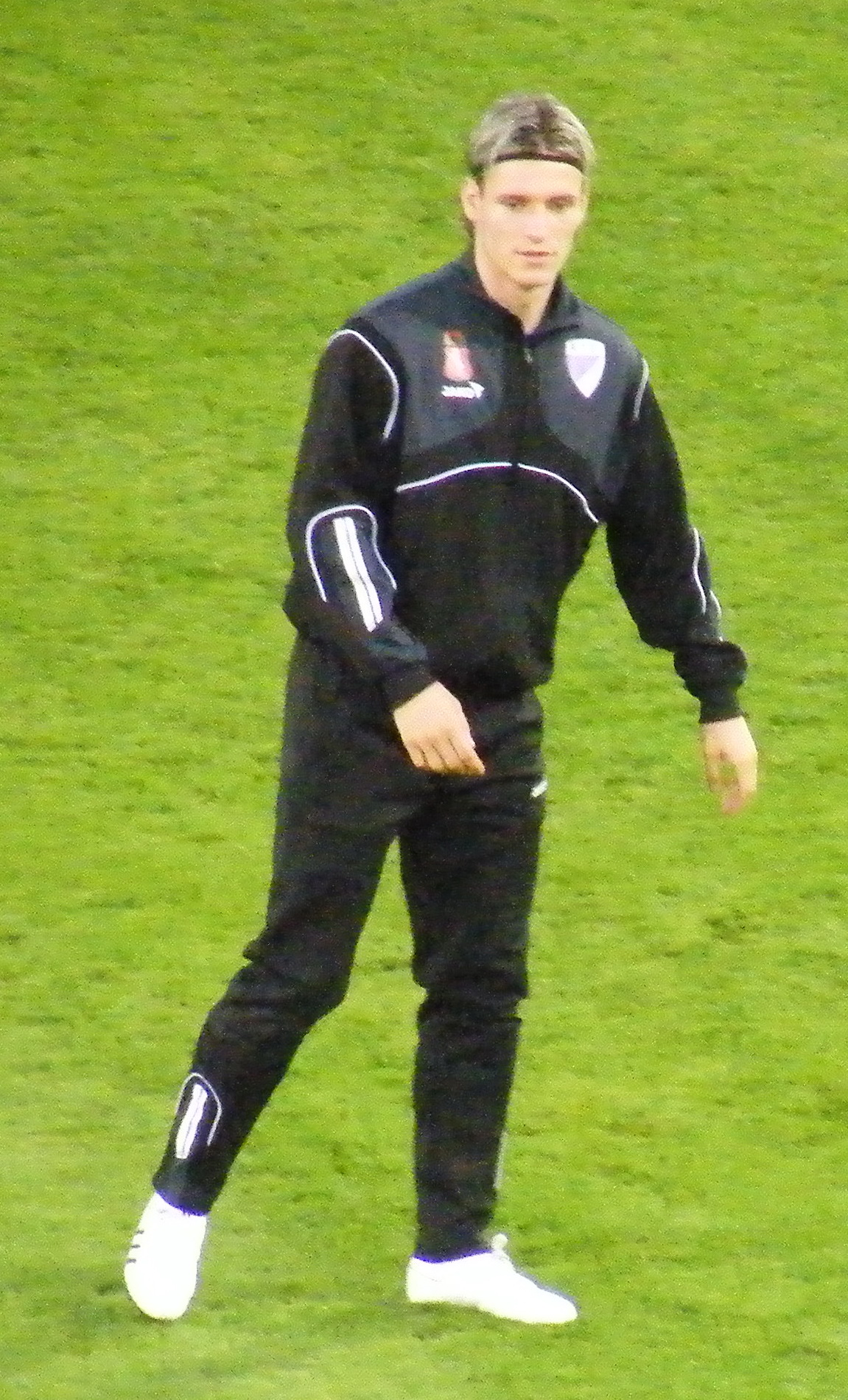

Personal information
- Full name: Uroš Veselič
- Date of birth: 20 May 1987 (age 39)
- Place of birth: Videm pri Ptuju, SFR Yugoslavia
- Height: 1.81 m (5 ft 11 1/2 in)
- Position: Striker

Youth career
- 2003–2005: Sturm Graz

Senior career*
Years	Team	Apps	(Gls)
2005–2008	Aluminij	73	(19)
2008	LASK	0	(0)
2008	Rudar Velenje	6	(0)
2009	Aluminij	4	(5)
2009–2010	Kecskeméti TE	9	(0)
2010	Drava Ptuj	10	(1)
2011	USV Allerheiligen	13	(1)
2011	Zavrč		
2012	SV Lebring	25	(19)
2013-2014	SV Frannach	38	(38)
2014-2015	TuS Blad Gleichenberg	36	(15)
2016-2018	UFC Fehring	66	(54)
2018-2019	TuS St. Stefan/Rosental	11	(1)
- * Club domestic league appearances and goals as of 3 February 2024

Uroš Veselič (born 20 May 1987 in Videm pri Ptuju) is a Slovenian retired footballer.
