= 2006–07 Budapest Honvéd FC season =

Honvéd
2006–07 season
- Chairman: George Hemingway
- Manager: Aldo Dolcetti (until 17 October 2006); Attila Supka (from 17 October 2006)
- Stadium: Béke téri Stadion (Note: The matches were played at the Béke téri Stadion in Budapest in the first half of the season, instead of Honvéd regular stadium, the Bozsik József Stadion in Budapest, due to the renovation work.) (Temporary stadium); Bozsik József Stadion (Home stadium)
- Nemzeti Bajnokság I: 8th
- Magyar Kupa: Winners
- Top goalscorer: League: Attila Dobos (8); All: Attila Dobos (13)
- Highest home attendance: 5,000 v Dunakanyar-Vác (3 March 2007, Nemzeti Bajnokság I)
- Lowest home attendance: 200 v Paks (13 November 2006, Nemzeti Bajnokság I)
- Average home league attendance: 2,433
- Biggest win: 6–0 v Dunakanyar-Vác (Home, 3 March 2007, Nemzeti Bajnokság I)
- Biggest defeat: 0–2 v Győr (Away, 29 July 2006, Nemzeti Bajnokság I); 1–3 v Dunakanyar-Vác (Away, 26 August 2006, Nemzeti Bajnokság I); 2–4 v Újpest (Away, 26 February 2007, Nemzeti Bajnokság I); 1–3 v Vasas (Away, 25 May 2007, Nemzeti Bajnokság I)

The 2006–07 season was Budapest Honvéd Football Club's 93rd competitive season, 3rd consecutive season in the Nemzeti Bajnokság I and 99th season in existence as a football club. In addition to the domestic league, Honvéd participated in that season's editions of the Magyar Kupa.

== Squad ==
Squad at end of season

Note: Flags indicate national team as defined under FIFA eligibility rules; some limited exceptions apply. Players may hold more than one non-FIFA nationality.

No.	Pos.	Nation	Player
1	GK	HUN	Iván Tóth
2	DF	HUN	József Mogyorósi
3	DF	SRB	Mićo Smiljanić
4	DF	HUN	András László
5	DF	CIV	Benjamin Angoua
6	MF	HUN	Tibor Pomper
7	MF	HUN	Gellért Ivancsics
8	FW	CMR	Edouard Ndjodo
9	MF	HUN	Attila Dobos
11	GK	CRO	Sandro Tomić
13	DF	HUN	Szabolcs Szeles
14	MF	MEX	José Manuel Rivera
15	DF	HUN	András Debreceni

No.	Pos.	Nation	Player
18	FW	CIV	Abraham Gneki Guié
19	MF	BRA	Diego
20	FW	SEN	Abass Cheikh Dieng
21	FW	HUN	Zoltán Hercegfalvi
23	DF	HUN	Zoltán Vincze
24	MF	HUN	Norbert Zana
25	MF	HUN	Tibor Szabó
27	MF	HUN	Gábor Koós
32	FW	HUN	Ferenc Kocsis
36	DF	HUN	Szabolcs Schindler
55	FW	SRB	Igor Bogdanović
79	MF	MOZ	Genito

== Competitions ==
=== Overview ===
Competition	First match	Last match	Starting round	Final position	Record							
Competition	First match	Last match	Starting round	Final position	Pld	W	D	L	GF	GA	GD	Win %
Nemzeti Bajnokság I	29 July 2006	25 May 2007	Matchday 1	8th	30	11	8	11	48	43	+5	36.67
Magyar Kupa	20 September 2006	9 May 2007	Third round	Winners	9	5	4	0	20	9	+11	55.56
Total					39	16	12	11	68	52	+16	41.03

Source: Competitions

=== Nemzeti Bajnokság I ===
==== League table ====
Pos	Team	Pld	W	D	L	GF	GA	GD	Pts	Qualification or relegation
6	Fehérvár	30	13	5	12	45	43	+2	44	
7	Kaposvár	30	12	5	13	40	36	+4	41	
8	Honvéd	30	11	8	11	48	43	+5	41	Qualification for the UEFA Cup first qualifying round (Note: Honvéd qualified for the UEFA Cup first qualifying round as the 2006–07 Magyar Kupa winners.)
9	Diósgyőr	30	11	5	14	40	52	−12	38	
10	Sopron	30	11	4	15	33	46	−13	37	

Source: soccerway.com

==== Results summary ====
Overall								Home						Away					
Pld	W	D	L	GF	GA	GD	Pts	W	D	L	GF	GA	GD	W	D	L	GF	GA	GD
30	11	8	11	48	43	+5	41	7	5	3	26	13	+13	4	3	8	22	30	−8

Source: Hungarian Football Federation

==== Results by round ====
Round	1	2	3	4	5	6	7	8	9	10	11	12	13	14	15	16	17	18	19	20	21	22	23	24	25	26	27	28	29	30
Ground	A	H	H	A	A	A	H	A	H	A	H	A	H	A	H	H	A	A	H	H	H	A	H	A	H	A	H	A	H	A
Result	L	D	D	L	W	L	L	W	W	L	L	D	D	L	L	W	W	L	W	W	W	L	W	D	D	D	W	W	D	L
Position	13	13	13	15	12	14	14	11	10	10	11	13	14	14	15	13	13	13	13	11	9	9	8	8	8	9	8	7	7	8
Points	0	1	2	2	5	5	5	8	11	11	11	12	13	13	13	16	19	19	22	25	28	28	31	32	33	34	37	40	41	41

Source: Matches
A = Away; H = Home; W = Win; D = Draw; L = Loss

==== Matches ====
29 July 2006 1	Győr	2–0	Honvéd	Győr (Note: The match was played at the Nádorvárosi Stadion in Győr, instead of Győr regular stadium, the Stadion ETO in Győr, which was demolished to make way to the newly built ETO Park.)
18:00 CEST (UTC+2)	Kovács (yellow card) 32'; Müller 60'; Vincze (yellow card) 78'; P. Tóth (yellow card) 79'; Bajzát 84'; Jäkl (yellow card) 90'	Report	Dobos (yellow card) 39'; Angoua (yellow card) 50'; Budovinszky (yellow card) 78'	Stadium: Nádorvárosi Stadion; Attendance: 2,000; Referee: Ferenc Bede; Assistant referees: Tibor Vámos, Zoltán Kovács; Fourth official: Krisztián Király

5 August 2006 2	Honvéd	2–2	Kaposvár	Budapest
20:00 CEST (UTC+2)	Genito (yellow card) 11'; Dobos 21' (pen.); Disztl 72'; Budovinszky (yellow card) 76'	Report	Vasiljević 39'; Grúz 80'	Stadium: Béke téri Stadion; Attendance: 2,000; Referee: János Megyebíró; Assistant referees: Zsolt Szpisják, István Albert; Fourth official: Miklós Demeter

19 August 2006 3	Honvéd	1–1	Újpest	Budapest
19:00 CEST (UTC+2)	Budovinszky (yellow card) 24'; Pomper (yellow card) 43'; Dobos 53' (pen.); Takács (yellow card) 83'; Dancs (red card) 89'	Report	Erős 17', (yellow card) 51'; Vermes (yellow card) 53'	Stadium: Béke téri Stadion; Attendance: 3,600; Referee: Mihály Fábián; Assistant referees: Tamás Márkus, Róbert Kispál; Fourth official: Tamás Bodac

26 August 2006 4	Dunakanyar-Vác	3–1	Honvéd	Vác
19:00 CEST (UTC+2)	Dudás (yellow card) 19'; Svintek (yellow card) 19', (goal) 90'; Sinkó (yellow card) 21'; Kovács (yellow card) 38'; Palásthy 39', (yellow card) 40'; Kulcsár 57'; Rusvay (yellow card) 74'; Laskai (yellow card) 80'; Farkas (yellow card) 88'	Report	Dobos 19'; Schindler (yellow card) 27'; Baranyai (yellow card) 70'; Angoua (yellow card) 82'	Stadium: Ligeti Stadion; Attendance: 1,800; Referee: Szabolcs Szilasi; Assistant referees: Imre Attila Nagy, Oszkár Lémon; Fourth official: J. Zoltán Kovács

10 September 2006 5	Rákospalota	3–4	Honvéd	Budapest
16:30 CEST (UTC+2)	Makra (yellow card) 40', (goal) 90+4'; Kapcsos (yellow card) 43'; G. Horváth (yellow card) 45'; Cseri (yellow card) 51'; Nyerges 70', 84' (pen.)	Report	Genito 18'; Koós 26'; Angoua (yellow card) 46'; Budovinszky 60', (red card) 85'; Hercegfalvi 67', (yellow card) 69'	Stadium: Budai II. László Stadion; Attendance: 1500; Referee: Tamás Bognár; Assistant referees: Gábor Erős, Tibor Vámos; Fourth official: Bence Gaál

15 September 2006 6	Debrecen	2–1	Honvéd	Debrecen
19:00 CEST (UTC+2)	Brnović (yellow card) 19', (goal) 24'; T. Sándor 26'; Madar (yellow card) 83'; Bernáth (yellow card) 90'	Report	Genito (yellow card) 10'; Csobánki (yellow card) 20'; Debreceni (red card) 37'; Dobos 74'	Stadium: Oláh Gábor utcai Stadion; Attendance: 7,000; Referee: Mihály Fábián; Assistant referees: István Albert, Dr. Zsolt Varga; Fourth official: Attila Hegedűs

25 September 2006 7	Honvéd	1–2	Zalaegerszeg	Budapest
18:00 CEST (UTC+2)	Koós 10', (yellow card) 31'	Report	Máté (yellow card) 25'; Francišković 82'; Waltner 88'	Stadium: Béke téri Stadion; Attendance: 1,000; Referee: Ferenc Bede; Assistant referees: Dr. Péter Kovács, Tamás Raff; Fourth official: Bence Gaál

30 September 2006 8	Tatabánya	1–2	Honvéd	Tatabánya
16:00 CEST (UTC+2)	Jezdimirović (yellow card) 6' (yellow-red card) 35'; Hajdú (yellow card) 56'; Vámosi 58'; Megyesi (yellow card) 90'	Report	Hercegfalvi 44'; Angoua (yellow card) 56' (yellow-red card) 56'; Schrancz 73'; Koós (yellow card) 90+2'	Stadium: Városi Stadion; Attendance: 2,500; Referee: Csaba Imre Sápi; Assistant referees: Gábor Takács, Balázs Huszár; Fourth official: Gábor Bendik

14 October 2006 9	Honvéd	2–0	Sopron	Budapest
18:00 CEST (UTC+2)	Hercegfalvi 42'; László 45'; Budovinszky (red card) 73'	Report	Ianc (yellow card) 21'; Munteanu (yellow card) 45'; Magasföldi (yellow card) 84'	Stadium: Béke téri Stadion; Attendance: 900; Referee: Tamás Arany; Assistant referees: Dr. Péter Hegyi, Zoltán Szalai; Fourth official: Gergely Sulyok

21 October 2006 10	Fehérvár	1–0	Honvéd	Székesfehérvár
18:00 CEST (UTC+2)	Kocsis (yellow card) 44'; Božić (yellow card) 59'; Sitku (yellow card) 62'; Csizmadia 83'	Report	Bartyik (yellow card) 19'; Genito (yellow card) 39'; Schindler (yellow card) 48'; Csobánki (yellow card) 83'	Stadium: Sóstói Stadion; Attendance: 2,000; Referee: Péter Solymosi; Assistant referees: Dr. Péter Szabó, György Ring; Fourth official: Csaba Pintér

28 October 2006 11	Honvéd	0–1	Pécs	Budapest
18:00 CEST (UTC+2)		Report	Finta (yellow card) 17', (goal) 74'	Stadium: Béke téri Stadion; Attendance: 800; Referee: István Mészáros; Assistant referees: László Viszokai, Dr. Ádám Vári; Fourth official: Bence Gaál

4 November 2006 12	MTK	2–2	Honvéd	Budapest
17:00 CET (UTC+1)	Kanta 54', 74'	Report	Dancs (yellow card) 19'; László 21'; Hercegfalvi 58'; Angoua (yellow card) 85'	Stadium: Hidegkuti Nándor Stadion; Attendance: 1,000; Referee: Szabolcs Szilasi; Assistant referees: Ferenc Székely, Zoltán Kis; Fourth official: László Varga

13 November 2006 13	Honvéd	0–0	Paks	Budapest
18:00 CET (UTC+1)	Dobos (yellow card) 47'; Dancs (yellow card) 64'	Report	Tamási (red card) 46'; Kóczián (yellow card) 77'	Stadium: Béke téri Stadion; Attendance: 200; Referee: Mihály Fábián; Assistant referees: Róbert Kispál, Balázs Farkas; Fourth official: Tamás Bodac

18 November 2006 14	Diósgyőr	2–1	Honvéd	Miskolc
16:00 CET (UTC+1)	Farkas 17'; Mogyorósi (yellow card) 36'; Abdou 55'; Szögedi (yellow card) 68'; Elek (yellow card) 85'	Report	Angoua (red card) 40'; Zana (yellow card) 59'; Schindler 74'	Stadium: Diósgyőri Stadion; Attendance: 4,500; Referee: Sorin Corpodean (Romania); Assistant referees: M. Nagy (Romania), G. Szabó (Romania); Fourth official: Csaba Imre Sápi (Hungary)

27 November 2006 15	Honvéd	0–1	Vasas	Budapest
18:00 CET (UTC+1)	Pomper (yellow card) 85'	Report	Pandur (yellow card) 12'; T. Nagy (yellow card) 47'; N. Németh 74'	Stadium: Béke téri Stadion; Attendance: 900; Referee: Károly Török; Assistant referees: Zoltán Tompos, Ferenc Székely

2 December 2006 16	Honvéd	4–1	Győr	Budapest
15:00 CET (UTC+1)	Dobos (yellow card) 1', (goal) 25'; Rigonato 15'; Disztl (yellow card) 27'; Baranyai (yellow card) 39', (goal) 45'; Hercegfalvi (yellow card) 56', (goal) 61'; Zana (yellow card) 65'	Report	Bank (yellow card) 38'; Tokody (yellow card) 54', (goal) 73'; Pákolicz (yellow card) 59'; Granát (yellow card) 76'	Stadium: Béke téri Stadion; Attendance: 300; Referee: Sándor Andó-Szabó; Assistant referees: Zsolt Szpisják, Attila Beidek; Fourth official: Attila Hegedűs

8 December 2006 17	Kaposvár	1–2	Honvéd	Kaposvár
17:00 CET (UTC+1)	Suljić (yellow card) 6'; Andruskó (yellow card) 29'; Alves 45'; D. Szakály (yellow card) 68'; Zahorecz (yellow card) 76'	Report	Disztl 10', (yellow card) 81'; Koós 57'; Zana (yellow card) 60'	Stadium: Rákóczi Stadion; Attendance: 3,000; Referee: Ferenc Bede; Assistant referees: Zsolt Márton, Balázs Farkas; Fourth official: Gergely Sulyok

26 February 2007 18	Újpest	4–2	Honvéd	Budapest
18:00 CET (UTC+1)	Zaleh 8', (yellow card) 10'; Erős (yellow card) 15'; Tisza 47'; Vermes (yellow card) 66', (goal) 72'; Z. Kovács I 70'	Report	Smiljanić (yellow card) 23', (goal) 90+1'; Pomper (yellow card) 27'; Angoua (yellow card) 29'; Ndjodo 69'	Stadium: Szusza Ferenc Stadion; Attendance: 3,222; Referee: Zoltán Iványi; Assistant referees: Dr. Péter Hegyi, János Medovarszki; Fourth official: Gábor Oláh

3 March 2007 19	Honvéd	6–0	Dunakanyar-Vác	Budapest
16:00 CET (UTC+1)	Ndjodo (yellow card) 21'; T. Szabó 39', 90'; Kovács 66' (o.g.); Dobos 72'; Hercegfalvi 74'; Bogdanović 76'	Report	Prado (yellow card) 13'; Makrai (yellow card) 23'	Stadium: Bozsik József Stadion; Attendance: 5,000; Referee: Krisztián Pánczél; Assistant referees: Tamás Márkus, Zoltán Pápai; Fourth official: J. Zoltán Kovács

10 March 2007 20	Honvéd	2–1	Rákospalota	Budapest
16:00 CET (UTC+1)	Vincze (yellow card) 24'; Smiljanić (yellow card) 47'; Dobos 57'; Koós 81'	Report	Török (yellow card) 8'; Pusztai (yellow card) 25'; Sallai (yellow card) 42'; Torma 47'; Kapcsos (yellow card) 88'	Stadium: Bozsik József Stadion; Attendance: 3,500; Referee: Csaba Imre Sápi; Assistant referees: Zsolt Márton, György Ring; Fourth official: Gergő Király

16 March 2007 21	Honvéd	2–1	Debrecen	Budapest
19:00 CET (UTC+1)	Smiljanić (yellow card) 15' (yellow-red card) 75'; Hercegfalvi 54'; Ndjodo 59'; Tomić (yellow card) 88'	Report	Bernáth (yellow card) 52'; Vukmir (yellow card) 56'; Sidibe 75'; T. Sándor (yellow card) 84'; Komlósi (red card) 90+2'	Stadium: Bozsik József Stadion; Attendance: 4,500; Referee: Péter Solymosi; Assistant referees: Róbert Kispál, Zsolt Butkai; Fourth official: Péter Herbály

2 April 2007 22	Zalaegerszeg	3–2	Honvéd	Zalaegerszeg
18:00 CEST (UTC+2)	Koplárovics (yellow card) 21' (yellow-red card) 34'; Waltner 44', 45', (yellow card) 45+1'; B. Molnár (yellow card) 52'; Lipčák (yellow card) 69'; Lekić 75'; Dianu (yellow card) 77'	Report	Ivancsics 21'; Tomić (yellow card) 45'; T. Szabó (yellow card) 52'; Angoua (yellow card) 56'; Pomper (yellow card) 82'; Hercegfalvi (red card) 77'; Genito 89'	Stadium: ZTE Arena; Attendance: 5,500; Referee: Viktor Kassai; Assistant referees: Gábor Erős, Tibor Vámos; Fourth official: Norbert Ferencz

7 April 2007 23	Honvéd	2–0	Tatabánya	Budapest
17:00 CEST (UTC+2)	Smiljanić (yellow card) 26' (yellow-red card) 88'; Mogyorósi (yellow card) 32'; Ivancsics 53'; Bogdanović 90+2'	Report	Z. Balogh (yellow card) 8'; Rajnay (yellow card) 45'	Stadium: Bozsik József Stadion; Attendance: 4,000; Referee: Mihály Fábián; Assistant referees: Zoltán Pápai, Dr. Zsolt Varga; Fourth official: Gergely Sulyok

14 April 2007 24	Sopron	1–1	Honvéd	Sopron
17:00 CEST (UTC+2)	Dancs (yellow card) 29'; Sira 67'; Feczesin (red card) 85'	Report	Koós 52'; Angoua (yellow card) 66'; László (yellow card) 85'	Stadium: Káposztás utcai Stadion; Attendance: 3,500; Referee: Zsolt Szabó; Assistant referees: Róbert Kispál, Zsolt Márton; Fourth official: Tibor Farkas

21 April 2007 25	Honvéd	1–1	Fehérvár	Budapest
18:00 CEST (UTC+2)	Guié 13'; Pomper (yellow card) 43'	Report	Baranyai 31', (yellow card) 61'; Fekete (yellow card) 38'; Božić (yellow card) 45'; Julinho (yellow card) 69'	Stadium: Bozsik József Stadion; Attendance: 3,500; Referee: Csaba Imre Sápi; Assistant referees: Zoltán Tompos, Péter Berettyán; Fourth official: István Kelemen

28 April 2007 26	Pécs	1–1	Honvéd	Pécs
17:00 CEST (UTC+2)	Lukács 47', (yellow card) 47'; Dienes (yellow card) 61'	Report	Vincze (yellow card) 22'; Pomper (yellow card) 59', (goal) 89'	Stadium: Stadion PMFC; Attendance: 1,200; Referee: Tamás Bognár; Assistant referees: Balázs Huszár, Dr. Péter Szabó; Fourth official: Attila Szommer

5 May 2007 27	Honvéd	2–1	MTK	Budapest
15:00 CEST (UTC+2)	Dobos 44'; Schindler (yellow card) 73'; Guié 82'	Report	K. Németh (yellow card) 12', (goal) 31'; Á. Szabó (yellow card) 23'; Pollák (yellow card) 72'	Stadium: Bozsik József Stadion; Attendance: 2,500; Referee: István Vad; Assistant referees: Vencel Tóth II, Zsolt Butkai; Fourth official: József Erdős

12 May 2007 28	Paks	1–2	Honvéd	Paks
17:30 CEST (UTC+2)	Csehi 32'; Zováth (yellow card) 45'	Report	Bogdanović 24', 64', (yellow card) 67'; Mogyorósi (yellow card) 30'	Stadium: Fehérvári úti Stadion; Attendance: 3,000; Referee: Tamás Arany; Assistant referees: Tibor Vígh, István Szécsényi; Fourth official: J. Zoltán Kovács

19 May 2007 29	Honvéd	1–1	Diósgyőr	Budapest
19:00 CEST (UTC+2)	Bogdanović 12'; Smiljanić (yellow card) 71'	Report	Sipeki 52'; Halgas (yellow card) 53'; Farkas (yellow card) 85'	Stadium: Bozsik József Stadion; Attendance: 3,800; Referee: Sándor Andó-Szabó; Assistant referees: István Albert, János Medovarszki; Fourth official: Péter Pető

25 May 2007 30	Vasas	3–1	Honvéd	Budapest
19:00 CEST (UTC+2)	Kenesei 5'; N. Németh 21'; Unierzyski (yellow card) 31'; T. Nagy 66', (yellow card) 73'; Fehér (yellow card) 67'; Odrobéna (yellow card) 86'	Report	Schindler (yellow card) 21'; Debreceni (yellow card) 28'; Bogdanović 65'	Stadium: Illovszky Rudolf Stadion; Attendance: 2,500; Referee: Viktor Kassai; Assistant referees: Gábor Erős, Tibor Vámos; Fourth official: Ádám Németh

=== Magyar Kupa ===
20 September 2006 Third round	Monor	2–6	Honvéd	Monor
15:30 CEST (UTC+2)	Csőke; Kerepeszki	Report	Dobos (pen.) 2x; László; Koós; Hercegfalvi; Disztl	Stadium: Balassi Bálint utcai Stadion; Attendance: 1,000; Referee: József Berger

25 October 2006 Round of 32	Orosháza	0–1	Honvéd	Orosháza
13:30 CEST (UTC+2)	R. Molnár (yellow card) 13'; N. Szabó (yellow card) 42'; Szeverényi (yellow card) 62'; Csiszár (yellow card) 75'	Report	Bartyik (yellow card) 40'; Angoua (yellow card) 43'; Hercegfalvi 64'	Stadium: Mátrai- Stadion; Attendance: 1,000; Referee: Róbert Nagy; Assistant referees: Dr. Zsolt Varga, Tamás Márkus

==== Round of 16 ====
8 November 2006 First leg	Honvéd	1–1	Kaposvár	Budapest
18:00 CET (UTC+1)	Hercegfalvi (yellow card) 28', (goal) 35'; Schindler (yellow card) 65'	Report	Kovácsevics (yellow card) 45'; Grúz (yellow card) 54'; Oláh 72'	Stadium: Béke téri Stadion; Attendance: 400; Referee: Csaba Imre Sápi; Assistant referees: Z. Szalai, István Tóth

22 November 2006 Second leg	Kaposvár	0–4 (1–5 agg.)	Honvéd	Kaposvár
17:00 CET (UTC+1)	Kozmér (yellow card) 34' (yellow-red card) 58'; Zahorecz (red card) 78'	Report	Dobos 33', 57'; Genito (yellow card) 45'; Kovácsevics 65' (o.g.); Pomper (yellow card) 71'; Hercegfalvi 69', (red card) 78'; Mészáros (yellow card) 78'	Stadium: Rákóczi Stadion; Attendance: 1,000; Referee: Tamás Bognár; Assistant referees: Dr. Péter Szabó, István Iványi
Note: Honvéd won 5–1 on aggregate.

==== Quarter-finals ====
13 March 2007 First leg	MTK	2–2	Honvéd	Budapest
18:00 CET (UTC+1)	Kanta 3'; Pollák (yellow card) 28'; Bori (yellow card) 29', (goal) 44'; Kriston (yellow card) 76'	Report	Bogdanović 7'; Dobos (yellow card) 24'; Genito (yellow card) 42'; Ndjodo 49'; Ivancsics (yellow card) 78'; Pomper (yellow card) 84'	Stadium: Hidegkuti Nándor Stadion; Attendance: 2,000; Referee: Sándor Andó-Szabó; Assistant referees: Zoltán Tompos, Dr. Ádám Vári

11 April 2007 Second leg	Honvéd	2–1 (4–3 agg.)	MTK	Budapest
18:00 CEST (UTC+2)	Dobos (yellow card) 44', (goal) 90'; Smiljanić 62'; T. Szabó (yellow card) 82'	Report	Pollák 5'; Hrepka (yellow card) 54'; L. Horváth (yellow card) 57'; Czvitkovics (yellow card) 67'	Stadium: Bozsik József Stadion; Attendance: 4,000; Referee: Ferenc Bede; Assistant referees: Tibor Vígh, Balázs Farkas; Fourth official: Csaba Pintér
Note: Honvéd won 4–3 on aggregate.

==== Semi-finals ====
18 April 2007 First leg	Honvéd	0–0	Vasas	Budapest
19:00 CEST (UTC+2)	Ndjodo (yellow card) 72'	Report	Pintér (yellow card) 45'; Pandur (yellow card) 51'; Balog (yellow card) 64'; Piller (yellow card) 88'	Stadium: Bozsik József Stadion; Attendance: 4,000; Referee: Viktor Kassai; Assistant referees: Gábor Erős, Tibor Vámos; Fourth official: Péter Herbály

24 April 2007 Second leg	Vasas	1–2 (1–2 agg.)	Honvéd	Budapest
18:00 CEST (UTC+2)	Pandur (yellow card) 20'; A. Tóth (yellow card) 31'; N. Németh 45'; Fehér (yellow card) 71'	Report	Dobos (yellow card) 10'; Bogdanović 19'; Ivancsics 26'; T. Szabó (yellow card) 70'; Mogyorósi (yellow card) 78'	Stadium: Illovszky Rudolf Stadion; Attendance: 4,000; Referee: Péter Solymosi; Assistant referees: Tibor Vígh, István Tóth; Fourth official: Gábor Oláh
Note: Honvéd won 2–1 on aggregate.

==== Final ====
9 May 2007 Final	Debrecen	2–2 (a.e.t.) (1–3 p)	Honvéd	Budapest
18:30 CEST (UTC+2)	Vukmir (yellow card) 35'; Zsolnai 70'; Bíró (yellow card) 77' (yellow-red card) 113'; Sidibe 97' (pen.), (yellow card) 119'; Komlósi (yellow card) 111'	Report	Angoua (yellow card) 20'; Ivancsics 28', (yellow card) 59'; T. Szabó (yellow card) 29', (goal) 105' (pen.); Pomper (yellow card) 63' (yellow-red card) 97'	Stadium: Szusza Ferenc Stadion; Attendance: 6,880; Referee: Ferenc Bede; Assistant referees: Zoltán Tompos, Zoltán Szalai; Fourth official: Péter Solymosi
	Penalties
	Komlósi (penalty missed); Sidibe (penalty scored); Z. Kiss (penalty missed); Zsolnai (penalty missed)		(penalty scored) Ivancsics; (penalty scored) Genito; (penalty missed) Ndjodo; (penalty scored) T. Szabó
Note: Honvéd won 3–1 on penalties.

== Statistics ==
=== Overall ===
Appearances (Apps) numbers are for appearances in competitive games only, including sub appearances.
Source: Competitions

No.	Player	Pos.	Nemzeti Bajnokság I				Magyar Kupa				Total			
No.	Player	Pos.	Apps	Goal	Yellow card	Red card	Apps	Goal	Yellow card	Red card	Apps	Goal	Yellow card	Red card
1	(Hungary) Iván Tóth	GK	8				6				14			
2	(Hungary) József Mogyorósi	DF	4		2		3		1		7		3	
3	(Serbia) Mićo Smiljanić	DF	7	1	5	2	4	1			11	2	5	2
4	(Hungary) András László	DF	15	2	1		4	1			19	3	1	
5	(Ivory Coast) Benjamin Angoua	DF	23		8	2	8		2		31		10	2
6	(Hungary) Tibor Pomper	MF	22	1	6		5		3	1	27	1	9	1
7	(Hungary) Gellért Ivancsics	MF	13	2	1		5	2	2		18	4	3	
7	(Hungary) Zsolt Lázár	MF	2								2			
8	(Cameroon) Edouard Ndjodo	FW	6	2	1		4	1	1		10	3	2	
8	(Hungary) Balázs Schrancz	MF	14	1			3				17	1		
9	(Hungary) Attila Dobos	MF	26	8	3		6	5	3		32	13	6	
11	(Hungary) Norbert Bartyik	MF	7		1		2		1		9		2	
11	(Croatia) Sandro Tomić	GK	12		2						12		2	
14	(Hungary) Attila Mészáros	DF	8				2		1		10		1	
14	(Mexico) José Manuel Rivera	MF	1								1			
15	(Hungary) András Debreceni	DF	19		1	1	7				26		1	1
16	(Hungary) Dávid Disztl	FW	13	2	2		4	1			17	3	2	
17	(Hungary) Krisztián Budovinszky	DF	6	1	3	2	2				8	1	3	2
18	(Hungary) Ádám Csobánki	FW	8		2		1				9		2	
18	(Ivory Coast) Abraham Gneki Guié	FW	5	2			2				7	2		
19	(Brazil) Diego	MF	11	1			2				13	1		
20	(Hungary) Zoltán Takács	DF	5		1		1				6		1	
21	(Hungary) Zoltán Hercegfalvi	FW	25	7	2	1	7	4	1	1	32	11	3	2
21	(Hungary) Richárd Ráthy	GK												
23	(Hungary) Zoltán Vincze	DF	16		2		4				20		2	
24	(Hungary) Norbert Zana	MF	9		3		3				12		3	
25	(Hungary) István Sándor	MF	6				3				9			
25	(Hungary) Tibor Szabó	MF	12	2	1		5	1	3		17	3	4	
26	(Hungary) Tibor Baranyai	DF	6	1	2						6	1	2	
27	(Hungary) Gábor Koós	MF	21	5	2		6	1			27	6	2	
28	(Hungary) Roland Dancs	MF	9		2	1	3				12		2	1
29	(Hungary) István Gajda	FW	4								4			
30	(Hungary) Zoltán Miski	GK	10				3				13			
31	(Hungary) István Lantos	FW	1								1			
32	(Hungary) Ferenc Kocsis	FW	1								1			
36	(Hungary) Szabolcs Schindler	DF	28	1	4		9		1		37	1	5	
55	(Serbia) Igor Bogdanović	FW	11	6	1		4	2			15	8	1	
79	(Mozambique) Genito	MF	24	2	3		7		2		31	2	5	
Own goals				1				1				2		
Totals				48	61	9		20	21	2		68	82	11

=== Clean sheets ===
			Clean sheets		
No.	Player	Games Played	Nemzeti Bajnokság I	Magyar Kupa	Total
30	(Hungary) Zoltán Miski	13	2	1	3
1	(Hungary) Iván Tóth	14		2	2
11	(Croatia) Sandro Tomić	12	2		2
Totals			4	3	7
