= 2005–06 Budapest Honvéd FC season =

Honvéd
2005–06 season
- Manager: Aldo Dolcetti
- Stadium: Bozsik József Stadion
- Nemzeti Bajnokság I: 13th
- Magyar Kupa: Semi-finals
- Highest home attendance: 7,000 v Újpest (22 October 2005, Nemzeti Bajnokság I)
- Lowest home attendance: 1,000 v Diósgyőr (29 April 2006, Nemzeti Bajnokság I)
- Average home league attendance: 2,260
- Biggest win: 4–0 v Zalaegerszeg (Home, 17 September 2005, Nemzeti Bajnokság I)
- Biggest defeat: 0–7 v Újpest (Away, 22 April 2006, Nemzeti Bajnokság I)

The 2005–06 season was Budapest Honvéd Football Club's 92nd competitive season, 2nd consecutive season in the Nemzeti Bajnokság I and 98th season in existence as a football club. In addition to the domestic league, Honvéd participated in that season's editions of the Magyar Kupa.

== Squad ==
Squad at end of season

Note: Flags indicate national team as defined under FIFA eligibility rules; some limited exceptions apply. Players may hold more than one non-FIFA nationality.

No.	Pos.	Nation	Player
1	GK	HUN	Iván Tóth
2	MF	MOZ	Miró
3	DF	HUN	Zoltán Kovács
4	DF	HUN	Szabolcs Udvari
5	MF	HUN	Roland Dancs
6	MF	HUN	Tibor Pomper
7	FW	HUN	István Borgulya
8	MF	HUN	Balázs Schrancz
9	MF	HUN	Attila Dobos
11	FW	HUN	Balázs Venczel
12	MF	HUN	Zsolt Lázár
13	FW	HUN	Balázs Bozori
14	DF	HUN	Attila Mészáros
15	DF	HUN	András Debreceni
16	MF	CMR	Eric Zambo

No.	Pos.	Nation	Player
18	FW	HUN	Ádám Csobánki
19	FW	CMR	Yannick Mbengono
20	DF	HUN	Zoltán Takács
21	GK	HUN	Richárd Ráthy
22	DF	HUN	Sándor Erdei
23	MF	MOZ	Genito
24	MF	HUN	Norbert Zana
25	FW	HUN	János Tőkés
26	DF	HUN	Tibor Baranyai
27	MF	HUN	Norbert Kovács
28	DF	HUN	Gábor Juhász
29	DF	CIV	Benjamin Angoua
30	GK	HUN	Zoltán Miski
31	FW	HUN	István Lantos
32	FW	HUN	Ferenc Kocsis

== Competitions ==
=== Overview ===
Competition	First match	Last match	Starting round	Final position	Record							
Competition	First match	Last match	Starting round	Final position	Pld	W	D	L	GF	GA	GD	Win %
Nemzeti Bajnokság I	30 July 2005	3 June 2006	Matchday 1	13th	30	8	9	13	33	52	−19	26.67
Magyar Kupa	10 September 2005	2 May 2006	Second round	Semi-finals	8	6	1	1	16	9	+7	75.00
Total					38	14	10	14	49	61	−12	36.84

Source: Competitions

=== Nemzeti Bajnokság I ===
==== League table ====
Pos	Team	Pld	W	D	L	GF	GA	GD	Pts
11	Zalaegerszeg	30	9	8	13	42	47	−5	35
12	Pécs	30	8	9	13	37	41	−4	33
13	Honvéd	30	8	9	13	33	52	−19	33
14	Rákospalota	30	7	5	18	30	59	−29	26
15	Vasas	30	5	10	15	32	47	−15	25

Source: RSSSF

==== Results summary ====
Overall								Home						Away					
Pld	W	D	L	GF	GA	GD	Pts	W	D	L	GF	GA	GD	W	D	L	GF	GA	GD
30	8	9	13	33	52	−19	33	5	4	6	20	22	−2	3	5	7	13	30	−17

Source: Competitions

==== Results by round ====
Round	1	2	3	4	5	6	7	8	9	10	11	12	13	14	15	16	17	18	19	20	21	22	23	24	25	26	27	28	29	30
Ground	A	H	A	A	H	A	H	A	H	A	H	A	H	A	H	H	A	H	H	A	H	A	H	A	H	A	H	A	H	A
Result	D	W	L	D	W	D	D	W	W	L	D	W	D	L	L	L	L	D	W	D	L	D	W	L	L	W	L	L	L	L
Position	7	3	9	8	6	8	8	6	5	6	6	5	5	6	6	8	11	11	9	9	9	9	8	10	11	9	9	10	12	13
Points	1	4	4	5	8	9	10	13	16	16	17	20	21	21	21	21	21	22	25	26	26	27	30	30	30	33	33	33	33	33

A = Away; H = Home; W = Win; D = Draw; L = Loss

==== Matches ====
30 July 2005 1	Sopron	1–1	Honvéd	Sopron
19:00 CEST (UTC+2)	Costișor (yellow card) 41'; Lazić (yellow card) 52', (goal) 65' (pen.)	Report	Zana (yellow card) 1'; Vadócz 57' (pen.); Z. Kovács II (yellow card) 59'	Stadium: Káposztás utcai Stadion; Attendance: 3,500; Referee: Tamás Arany; Assistant referees: P. Szabó, Z. Kovács

7 August 2005 2	Honvéd	3–1	Ferencváros	Budapest
11:30 CEST (UTC+2)	Alves 9', 37', 60'; Dobos (yellow card) 14'; Z. Takács (yellow card) 29'; Bojtor (yellow card) 90+2'	Report	Keller (yellow card) 50'; Tímár 69'; Tőzsér (yellow card) 78'	Stadium: Bozsik József Stadion; Attendance: 3,000; Referee: Ferenc Bede; Assistant referees: T. Vámos, Z. Tompos

21 August 2005 3	Fehérvár	3–0	Honvéd	Székesfehérvár
19:00 CEST (UTC+2)	Božić 23', (red card) 75'; Kuttor (yellow card) 29'; Koller (yellow card) 37'; Schwarcz (yellow card) 41'; Disztl 70'; G. Horváth II (red card) 75'; B. Farkas II 80'	Report	N. Kovács (red card) 75'; A. Mészáros (yellow card) 86'	Stadium: Sóstói Stadion; Attendance: 8,000; Referee: Szabolcs Saskőy; Assistant referees: Székely, Heibl

27 August 2005 4	Pápa	2–2	Honvéd	Pápa
19:00 CEST (UTC+2)	Herczeg 28', (yellow card); Lipták 58'; Remili (yellow card); Kincses (yellow card)	Report	Csobánki 13', (yellow card); Genito 66'; Z. Takács (yellow card); Dobos (yellow card); Z. Kovács II (yellow card); Zana (yellow card)	Stadium: Perutz Stadion; Attendance: 2,300; Referee: Attila Hanacsek; Assistant referees: Dr. P. Szabó, Dr. P. Kovács; Fourth official: N. Kiss

17 September 2005 5	Honvéd	4–0	Zalaegerszeg	Budapest
19:00 CEST (UTC+2)	Z. Kovács II (yellow card) 2'; Dancs 44'; Miró 66'; Z. Takács 69'; Alves 88' (pen.)	Report	Bojović (yellow card) 7'	Stadium: Bozsik József Stadion; Attendance: 1,500; Referee: János Megyebíró; Assistant referees: Szpisják, P. Tóth

24 September 2005 6	Kaposvár	0–0	Honvéd	Kaposvár
19:00 CEST (UTC+2)	A. Pintér (yellow card) 42'; Zahorecz (yellow card) 60'; P. Máté I (yellow card) 77'	Report	Alves (yellow card) 4'; Dobos (yellow card) 81'	Stadium: Rákóczi Stadion; Attendance: 3,000; Referee: József Erdős; Assistant referees: T. Vámos, B. Gaál

15 October 2005 8	Győr	1–2	Honvéd	Győr
18:00 CEST (UTC+2)	Kenesei 28' (pen.); P. Tóth (yellow card) 47'; Makra (yellow card) 78'	Report	Miró 10'; Genito (yellow card) 31'; Z. Kovács II (yellow card) 39'; Udvari (yellow card) 42'; Z. Takács 87'	Stadium: Stadion ETO; Attendance: 1,500; Referee: János Makai; Assistant referees: Z. Tompos, Z. Szalai

22 October 2005 9	Honvéd	1–0	Újpest	Budapest
18:00 CEST (UTC+2)	Z. Takács 65'; Genito (yellow card) 89'	Report	Freud (yellow card) 33' (yellow-red card) 43'; Böjte (red card) 90+2'	Stadium: Bozsik József Stadion; Attendance: 7,000; Referee: Attila Dubraviczky; Assistant referees: Hegyi, Kispál

29 October 2005 10	Diósgyőr	1–0	Honvéd	Miskolc
18:00 CEST (UTC+2)	F. Horváth 87'	Report		Stadium: Diósgyőri Stadion; Attendance: 8,000; Referee: Tamás Arany; Assistant referees: G. Erőss, A. Kelemen

5 November 2005 11	Honvéd	2–2	Vasas	Budapest
18:00 CET (UTC+1)	Z. Takács 33' (pen.); Z. Kovács II (yellow card) 37', (goal) 78'; Venczel (yellow card) 86'; Udvari (red card) 87'	Report	Völgyi (yellow card) 27'; Salamon (yellow card) 33'; Füzi (yellow card) 47'; Gyánó 73'; Z. Molnár (red card) 87'; Bárányos 90'	Stadium: Bozsik József Stadion; Attendance: 3,500; Referee: János Megyebíró; Assistant referees: Szpisják, P. Tóth

19 November 2005 12	Rákospalota	1–3	Honvéd	Budapest
13:00 CET (UTC+1)	Nyerges 16' (pen.); Somorjai (yellow card) 51'; Torma (yellow card) 67'	Report	N. Kovács (yellow card) 16'; Alves 25' (pen.); Miró 48'; Z. Kovács II (yellow card) 62'; Dobos 76'	Stadium: Budai II. László Stadion; Attendance: 2,500; Referee: István Vad; Assistant referees: Z. Tompos, I. Tóth

26 November 2005 13	Honvéd	1–1	Pécs	Budapest
17:00 CET (UTC+1)	Dobos 84'	Report	Pavičević 60'	Stadium: Bozsik József Stadion; Attendance: 1,500; Referee: Tamás Arany; Assistant referees: P. Hegyi, I. Albert

29 November 2005 7	Honvéd	2–2	MTK	Budapest
18:00 CET (UTC+1)	Genito (yellow card) 15'; Z. Kovács II (yellow card) 17' (yellow-red card) 83'; Venczel (yellow card) 29'; Udvari (yellow card) 51'; Z. Takács (yellow card) 64'; Miró 67'; Alves 81'; Dobos (yellow card) 90'; Schultz (red card) 90+6'; Borgulya (after the match) (red card)	Report	Kanta 32' (pen.); Lambulić (yellow card) 44', (goal) 90+8'	Stadium: Bozsik József Stadion; Attendance: 1,500; Referee: Szabolcs Saskőy; Assistant referees: Székely, Heibl

3 December 2005 14	Debrecen	6–1	Honvéd	Debrecen
15:00 CET (UTC+1)	Brnović 10'; N. Kovács 13' (o.g.); Sidibe 45' (pen.), 51'; Ferenczi 74', 83'; T. Sándor (yellow card) 77'	Report	Udvari (yellow card) 45'; Lázár (yellow card) 65'; Dobos 77' (pen.)	Stadium: Oláh Gábor utcai Stadion; Attendance: 7,000; Referee: János Makai; Assistant referees: G. Takács, Z. Szabó

10 December 2005 15	Honvéd	1–3	Tatabánya	Budapest
15:00 CET (UTC+1)	Venczel 5'; Genito (yellow card) 8'; Bojtor (yellow card) 9'; Z. Kovács II (yellow card) 39'	Report	Z. Szabó I (yellow card) 11'; Jerson 18', (yellow card) 51'; Filó (yellow card) 19', (goal) 72'; Márkus 80'	Stadium: Bozsik József Stadion; Attendance: 2,000; Referee: Attila Dubraviczky; Assistant referees: I. A. Nagy, I. Tóth

25 February 2006 16	Honvéd	0–3	Sopron	Budapest
16:00 CET (UTC+1)		Report	Signori 17'; László (yellow card) 49'; Bagoly (yellow card) 56'; A. Horváth 57'; Demjén 83'	Stadium: Bozsik József Stadion; Attendance: 2,000; Referee: Péter Solymosi; Assistant referees: Ortó, T. Márkus

18 March 2006 19	Honvéd	1–0	Pápa	Budapest
16:00 CET (UTC+1)	Bozori 78'	Report	Lungu (yellow card) 71'	Stadium: Bozsik József Stadion; Attendance: 1,200; Referee: Sándor Gergely; Assistant referees: P. Hegyi, L. Varga II

25 March 2006 20	Zalaegerszeg	0–0	Honvéd	Zalaegerszeg
17:00 CET (UTC+1)	B. Molnár (yellow card) 74'	Report	Zambo (yellow card) 60'; Bozori (yellow card) 77'	Stadium: ZTE Arena; Attendance: 5,000; Referee: Ferenc Bede; Assistant referees: T. Vámos, Z. Kovács

1 April 2006 21	Honvéd	0–2	Kaposvár	Budapest
19:00 CEST (UTC+2)		Report	Zsolnai 6', (yellow card) 56'; Zahorecz 67', (yellow card) 78'	Stadium: Bozsik József Stadion; Attendance: 3,000; Referee: Péter Solymosi; Assistant referees: Szpisják, I. Albert

7 April 2006 22	MTK	0–0	Honvéd	Budapest
19:00 CEST (UTC+2)	Lambulić (yellow card) 33'; Pollák (yellow card) 51'	Report	Pomper (yellow card) 27'; Z. Kovács II (yellow card) 49'; Mbengono (yellow card) 88'	Stadium: Hidegkuti Nándor Stadion; Attendance: 1,500; Referee: István Vad; Assistant referees: P. Tóth, I. A. Nagy

12 April 2006 17	Ferencváros	3–1	Honvéd	Budapest
19:00 CEST (UTC+2)	Tímár (yellow card) 13'; Jovánczai 27', (yellow card) 68'; Zo. Balog 41'; Lipcsei 67' (pen.)	Report	Csobánki (yellow card) 18'; Z. Takács (yellow card) 40'; Schrancz 45'; Udvari (yellow card) 61'	Stadium: Üllői úti Stadion; Attendance: 3,000; Referee: Zsolt Szabó; Assistant referees: Hegyi, R. Kispál

15 April 2006 23	Honvéd	3–2	Győr	Budapest
18:00 CEST (UTC+2)	Dobos 3', 18'; Udvari (yellow card) 33'; Genito 88'	Report	Vincze (yellow card) 8', (goal) 9'; Priskin 90+2'	Stadium: Bozsik József Stadion; Attendance: 1,500; Referee: Csaba Imre Sápi; Assistant referees: I. Tóth, L. Tóth. L.

19 April 2006 18	Honvéd	1–1	Fehérvár	Budapest
18:00 CEST (UTC+2)	Schrancz (yellow card) 19' (yellow-red card) 49', (goal) 49'; Z. Takács (yellow card) 31'	Report	D. Nagy 7'; Csizmadia (yellow card) 58'	Stadium: Bozsik József Stadion; Attendance: 2,000; Referee: Mihály Fábián; Assistant referees: Ortó, Márkus

22 April 2006 24	Újpest	7–0	Honvéd	Budapest
15:00 CEST (UTC+2)	Vermes 11'; Lucas 44'; Füzi 49'; Tisza 59'; G. Sándor 67'; Hullám 83'; Vaskó (yellow card) 90'; Vituska 90'	Report	Z. Kovács II (yellow card) 20' (yellow-red card) 75'; Z. Takács (yellow card) 28'; N. Kovács (yellow card) 58'; Zambo (yellow card) 68'	Stadium: Szusza Ferenc Stadion; Attendance: 7,000; Referee: Péter Solymosi; Assistant referees: G. Erős, I. A. Nagy

29 April 2006 25	Honvéd	0–1	Diósgyőr	Budapest
18:00 CEST (UTC+2)	Udvari (yellow card) 23'; Pomper (yellow card) 29'; N. Kovács (yellow card) 41'	Report	Binder 18'; Szögedi (yellow card) 69'; Vitelki (yellow card) 71'	Stadium: Bozsik József Stadion; Attendance: 1,000; Referee: Tamás Arany; Assistant referees: Hegyi, Heibl

5 May 2006 26	Vasas	1–2	Honvéd	Budapest
19:00 CEST (UTC+2)	Z. Molnár (yellow card) 5'; Bárányos (yellow card) 37'; Janjić (yellow card) 55'; A. Tóth (yellow card) 81'; O. Szabó 88'	Report	Dobos (yellow card) 2'; Ráthy (yellow card) 10'; Csobánki 21'; Schrancz (yellow card) 71'; Dancs 74'	Stadium: Illovszky Rudolf Stadion; Attendance: 800; Referee: István Vad; Assistant referees: Z. Szalai, T. Vígh

13 May 2006 27	Honvéd	1–3	Rákospalota	Budapest
19:00 CEST (UTC+2)	Baranyai 20'; Angoua (red card) 33'; Bozori (yellow card) 76'; Z. Takács (yellow card) 78'; Dobos (yellow card) 85'	Report	Somorjai 1', 49'; G. Horváth I (yellow card) 27'; G. Nagy I (yellow card) 43'; Földvári (yellow card) 64'; Polonkai 90+3'	Stadium: Bozsik József Stadion; Attendance: 1,200; Referee: Csaba Imre Sápi; Assistant referees: I. Albert, P. Tóth

20 May 2006 28	Pécs	1–0	Honvéd	Pécs
18:00 CEST (UTC+2)	Kulcsár 9'; Győri (yellow card) 28'; Berdó (yellow card) 65'	Report	Z. Kovács II (yellow card) 17'	Stadium: Stadion PMFC; Attendance: 1,200; Referee: Károly Török; Assistant referees: Szalay, Z. Márton

26 May 2006 29	Honvéd	0–1	Debrecen	Budapest
19:00 CEST (UTC+2)	Udvari (yellow card) 45'	Report	Bogdanović 12' (pen.), (yellow card) 48'	Stadium: Bozsik József Stadion; Attendance: 2,000; Referee: Attila Hanacsek; Assistant referees: I. Tóth, J. Heibl

3 June 2006 30	Tatabánya	3–1	Honvéd	Tatabánya
18:00 CEST (UTC+2)	Filó 34'; Márkus 68'; Z. Tóth 74', (yellow card) 74'; Bakrač (yellow card) 78'; Kerényi (yellow card) 87'	Report	Angoua (yellow card) 33'; Csobánki 35'	Stadium: Városi Stadion; Attendance: 3,500; Referee: Tamás Bognár; Assistant referees: I. A. Nagy, Raff

=== Magyar Kupa ===
10 September 2005 Second round	Bonyhád	2–5 (a.e.t.)	Honvéd	Bonyhád
13:00 CEST (UTC+2)	Bíró; Zsók	Report	Z. Kovács II, (yellow card); Alves; Venczel; Z. Takács; Udvari, (yellow card); Genito (yellow card)	Stadium: Sport úti Pálya; Attendance: 1,600; Referee: Z. Kovács; Assistant referees: N. Ferencz, Golubics

21 September 2005 Third round	Mosonmagyaróvár	2–3 (a.e.t.)	Honvéd	Mosonmagyaróvár
15:30 CEST (UTC+2)	Papp 58', 71'; Burkus (yellow card) (yellow-red card) 91'	Report	Dobos 51'; Tangara 56'; Genito 92', (yellow card); Tőkés (yellow card); Csobánki (yellow card); Dancs (yellow card)	Stadium: Wittmann Antal park Attendance: 1,000; Referee: István Vad; Assistant referees: Tompos, Herbály

==== Round of 16 ====
26 October 2005 First leg	Honvéd	2–1	BKV Előre	Budapest
19:00 CEST (UTC+2)	Zana (yellow card); Udvari (yellow card); Bojtor 60', (yellow card); Z. Takács 89'	Report	Sidó (yellow card); Stefán (yellow card); Matondo 62'	Stadium: Bozsik József Stadion; Attendance: 1,500; Referee: Viktor Kassai; Assistant referees: G. Erős, Z. Márton

23 November 2005 Second leg	BKV Előre	1–3 (2–5 agg.)	Honvéd	Budapest
12:30 CET (UTC+1)	Galántai (yellow card); A. Kovács (yellow card); A. Varga (yellow card); I. Sándor 21'	Report	Zana (yellow card); Borgulya (yellow card); Miró 18'; Z. Takács 25'; Dobos 41'	Stadium: Sport utcai Stadion; Attendance: 500; Referee: Zsolt Szabó; Assistant referees: Kispál, V. Tóth II
Note: Honvéd won 5–2 on aggregate.

==== Quarter-finals ====
22 March 2006 First leg	Sopron	0–0	Honvéd	Sopron
17:00 CET (UTC+1)	Sartor (yellow card) 31'; László (yellow card) 34'; A. Horváth (yellow card) 60'	Report	Pomper (yellow card) 21'; Venczel (red card) 34'; Z. Kovács II (yellow card) 79'; I. Tóth (yellow card) 84'	Stadium: Káposztás utcai Stadion; Attendance: 2,600; Referee: Zsolt Szabó; Assistant referees: Kispál, P. Szabó

29 March 2006 Second leg	Honvéd	1–0 (1–0 agg.)	Sopron	Budapest
18:00 CEST (UTC+2)	Dancs (yellow card) 26'; Z. Kovács II (yellow card) 35'; Schrancz 83'	Report	Bagoly (yellow card) 37'; Z. Kiss II (yellow card) 76'; Sartor (yellow card) 90+2'	Stadium: Bozsik József Stadion; Attendance: 1,500; Referee: Csaba Imre Sápi; Assistant referees: L. Tóth. L., Kelemen
Note: Honvéd won 1–0 on aggregate.

==== Semi-finals ====
26 April 2006 First leg	Honvéd	1–3	Vasas	Budapest
18:00 CEST (UTC+2)	N. Kovács (yellow card) 28'; Miró 48'; Dobos (yellow card) 69'	Report	Udvari 1' (o.g.); Gyánó 31'; Zs. Balog (yellow card) 57'; Bárányos 75'	Stadium: Bozsik József Stadion; Attendance: 1,500; Referee: János Megyebíró; Assistant referees: P. Tóth, Szpisják

2 May 2006 Second leg	Vasas	0–1 (3–2 agg.)	Honvéd	Budapest
18:00 CEST (UTC+2)	A. Tóth (yellow card) 12'; H. Rósa (red card) 45'; Waltner (yellow card) 83'	Report	Udvari (yellow card) 18'; Z. Takács (yellow card) 33'; Pomper (red card) 45'; Miró (yellow card) 72'; Dobos 73'; Schrancz (yellow card) 90'	Stadium: Illovszky Rudolf Stadion; Attendance: 1,000; Referee: Sándor Gergely; Assistant referees: L. Varga II, Z. Kovács
Note: Vasas won 3–2 on aggregate.
