= 2007–08 FC Sopron season =

Sopron
2007–08 season
- Manager: Lajos Détári (until 27 September); Tibor Végh (caretaker, from 27 September to 1 October); Vincenzo Cosco (from 1 October to 26 November); Tibor Végh (from 28 November)
- Stadium: Káposztás utcai Stadion
- Nemzeti Bajnokság I: 16th (excluded)
- Magyar Kupa: Round of 16
- Ligakupa: Autumn season: Group stage Spring season: Group stage (excluded)
Home colours	Away colours

The 2007–08 season was Football Club Sopron's 8th consecutive season in the Nemzeti Bajnokság I and 86th year in existence as a football club. In addition to the domestic league, Sopron participated in this season's editions of the Magyar Kupa and the Ligakupa.

On 4 January 2008, the First Level Licensing Body of the HFF revoked the license of the club due to debt to the Tax and Financial Control Administration, the players, and also to the Federation. An agreement has been made with Rákospalotai EAC, the football club from Budapest, to play its home games in the spring in Sopron due to the missing illumination of the Budai II. László Stadion. The people of the city could still attend top-tier football games. On 5 February 2008, the Disciplinary Committee excluded Sopron from the first division for not having a license as per the regulations of the competition. It became official on 19 February 2008, after they refused to appeal against the first instance decision. After the exclusion, the matches were registered with an automatic 3 points and goal difference of 3–0 to the opponent team.

== Squad ==
As of 31 October 2007

Note: Flags indicate national team as defined under FIFA eligibility rules; some limited exceptions apply. Players may hold more than one non-FIFA nationality.

No.	Pos.	Nation	Player
1	GK	HUN	Tamás Takács
6	FW	HUN	István Sira
8	DF	HUN	László Reinhardt
9	FW	SRB	Danilo Belić
12	GK	HUN	Ákos Fentős
14	FW	ITA	Orlando Aquino
17	MF	HUN	Zoltán Csontos
19	DF	HUN	Zoltán Fehér
21	MF	HUN	Gábor Gyömbér
22	MF	HUN	Attila Hullám
23	FW	HUN	Botond Birtalan
24	DF	HUN	András Dlusztus

No.	Pos.	Nation	Player
26	FW	FRA	Jimmy Jones Tchana
29	DF	HUN	Sándor Csikós
30	DF	ROU	Cosmin Giura
33	MF	HUN	Tamás Sifter
34	DF	HUN	Attila Farkas
38	GK	HUN	Márk Heinrich
55	GK	HUN	Zoltán Varga
66	DF	HUN	Zoltán Pintér
79	FW	HUN	Gábor Freud
83	MF	HUN	Norbert Zana
85	MF	HUN	Csaba Ködöböcz
91	MF	HUN	Roland Dancs

== Competitions ==
=== Overview ===
Competition	First match	Last match	Starting round	Final position	Record							
Competition	First match	Last match	Starting round	Final position	Pld	W	D	L	GF	GA	GD	Win %
Nemzeti Bajnokság I	21 July 2007	1 June 2008	Matchday 1	16th	30	2	5	23	10	73	−63	6.67
Magyar Kupa	29 August 2007	7 November 2007	Third round	Round of 16	4	2	0	2	6	6	+0	50.00
Ligakupa (Autumn season)	14 August 2007	9 October 2007	Group stage	Group Stage	6	2	0	4	8	16	−8	33.33
Ligakupa (Spring season)	1 December 2007	27 February 2008	Group stage	Group Stage	6	1	0	5	4	18	−14	16.67
Total					46	7	5	34	28	113	−85	15.22

Source: Competitions

=== Nemzeti Bajnokság I ===
==== League table ====
Pos	Team	Pld	W	D	L	GF	GA	GD	Pts	Qualification or relegation
12	Rákospalota	30	7	9	14	42	60	−18	30	
13	Diósgyőr	30	5	13	12	43	63	−20	28	
14	Siófok	30	6	9	15	33	46	−13	27	
15	Tatabánya (R)	30	2	4	24	34	93	−59	10	Relegation to Nemzeti Bajnokság II
16	Sopron (Note: FC Sopron couldn't finish the 2007–08 season, because of bankruptcy. All remaining matches will be counted as won for their opponents.) (D)	30	2	5	23	10	73	−63	0	Exclution and Dissolution

Source: soccerway.com
(D) Disqualified; (R) Relegated

==== Results summary ====
Overall								Home						Away					
Pld	W	D	L	GF	GA	GD	Pts	W	D	L	GF	GA	GD	W	D	L	GF	GA	GD
30	2	5	23	10	73	−63	11	1	3	11	5	34	−29	1	2	12	5	39	−34

Source: Hungarian Football Federation

==== Matches ====
21 July 2007 1	Kaposvár	1–1	Sopron	Kaposvár
	P. Szakály 56'	Report	Sira 35'	Stadium: Rákóczi Stadion; Referee: Péter Solymosi

29 July 2007 2	Sopron	0–1	Honvéd	Sopron
		Report	Angoua 66'	Stadium: Káposztás utcai Stadion; Referee: Viktor Kassai

4 August 2007 3	Vasas	2–0	Sopron	Budapest
		Report		Stadium: Illovszky Rudolf Stadion; Referee: Tamás Arany

11 August 2007 4	Sopron	1–1	Nyíregyháza	Sopron
	Tchana 10'	Report	Miskolczi 27'	Stadium: Káposztás utcai Stadion; Referee: István Mészáros

18 August 2007 5	Tatabánya	0–1	Sopron	Tatabánya
		Report	Tchana 64'	Stadium: Stadion Városi; Referee: Csaba Imre Sápi

25 August 2007 6	Sopron	2–1	Rákospalota	Sopron
	Sira (yellow card) 17'; Belić 37', 85'; Reinhardt (yellow card) 50'; Pintér (yellow card) 52'	Report	Kapcsos (yellow card) 49'; Torma 68'; Z. Varga (yellow card) 90'; Polonkai (yellow card) 90+3'	Stadium: Stadion Városi; Attendance: 3,000; Referee: Zsolt Szabó

1 September 2007 7	Győr	1–1	Sopron	Győr
	Fehér 28' (o.g.)	Report	Hullám 9'	Stadium: ETO Park; Referee: József Berger

15 September 2007 8	Fehérvár	2–0	Sopron	Székesfehérvár
	Csobánki 23'; Sitku 45'	Report		Stadium: Sóstói Stadion; Referee: Sándor Andó-Szabó

22 September 2007 9	Sopron	1–1	Paks	Sopron
	Zana 83'	Report	Éger 75'	Stadium: Káposztás utcai Stadion; Referee: Szabolcs Szilasi

29 September 2007 10	Újpest	4–0	Sopron	Budapest
	Tisza 4', 22'; Dourandi 9'; Kéthévoama 42'	Report		Stadium: Szusza Ferenc Stadion; Referee: Viktor Kassai

6 October 2007 11	Sopron	0–1	Diósgyőr	Sopron
		Report	Simon 14'	Stadium: Káposztás utcai Stadion; Referee: Ferenc Bede

20 October 2007 12	Debrecen	4–2	Sopron	Debrecen
	Kouemaha 11', 18', 28', 61'	Report	Zana 7'; Györök (yellow card) 34'; Belić 84'	Stadium: Oláh Gábor utcai Stadion; Referee: István Mészáros

3 November 2007 13	Sopron	0–0	Siófok	Sopron
		Report		Stadium: Káposztás utcai Stadion; Referee: Zsolt Szabó

10 November 2007 14	Zalaegerszeg	4–0	Sopron	Zalaegerszeg
	Méyé 38', 76' (pen.); B. Molnár (yellow card) 68'; Kádár 81'; Koplárovics 85'	Report	Takács (yellow card) 75'; Zana (yellow card) 84'; Csikós (yellow card) 87'	Stadium: ZTE Arena; Referee: Tamás Bognár

29 November 2007 15	Sopron	1–5	MTK	Sopron
	C. Galliano (yellow card) 32'; Tchana 45'; Fehér (yellow card) 60'	Report	Urbán 13', 20', 66', 90+1'; C. Galliano 75' (o.g.)	Stadium: Káposztás utcai Stadion; Referee: István Mészáros
Note: The match was originally played on 26 November 2007, but was postponed due to snow after the 38th minute.

23 February 2008 16	Sopron	0–3 (Awarded)	Kaposvár	Sopron
		Report		Stadium: Káposztás utcai Stadion

1 March 2008 17	Honvéd	3–0 (Awarded)	Sopron	Budapest
		Report		Stadium: Bozsik József Stadion

8 March 2008 18	Sopron	0–3 (Awarded)	Vasas	Sopron
		Report		Stadium: Káposztás utcai Stadion

15 March 2008 19	Nyíregyháza	3–0 (Awarded)	Sopron	Nyíregyháza
		Report		Stadium: Városi Stadion

22 March 2008 20	Sopron	0–3 (Awarded)	Tatabánya	Sopron
		Report		Stadium: Káposztás utcai Stadion

29 March 2008 21	Rákospalota	3–0 (Awarded)	Sopron	Sopron
		Report		Stadium: Káposztás utcai Stadion

5 April 2008 22	Sopron	0–3 (Awarded)	Győr	Sopron
		Report		Stadium: Káposztás utcai Stadion

12 April 2008 23	Sopron	0–3 (Awarded)	Fehérvár	Sopron
		Report		Stadium: Káposztás utcai Stadion

19 April 2008 24	Paks	3–0 (Awarded)	Sopron	Paks
		Report		Stadium: Fehérvári úti Stadion

26 April 2008 25	Sopron	0–3 (Awarded)	Újpest	Sopron
		Report		Stadium: Káposztás utcai Stadion

3 May 2008 26	Diósgyőr	3–0 (Awarded)	Sopron	Miskolc
		Report		Stadium: Diósgyőri Stadion

10 May 2008 27	Sopron	0–3 (Awarded)	Debrecen	Sopron
		Report		Stadium: Káposztás utcai Stadion

17 May 2008 28	Siófok	3–0 (Awarded)	Sopron	Siófok
		Report		Stadium: Révész Géza utcai Stadion

25 May 2008 29	Sopron	0–3 (Awarded)	Zalaegerszeg	Sopron
		Report		Stadium: Káposztás utcai Stadion

1 June 2008 30	MTK	3–0 (Awarded)	Sopron	Budapest
		Report		Stadium: Hidegkuti Nándor Stadion

=== Magyar Kupa ===
29 August 2007 Third round	Celldömölk	0–3	Sopron	Celldömölk
		Report	Belić 7'; Tchana 10', 38'	Stadium: Kolozsvár utcai Pálya; Referee: Norbert Ferencz

26 September 2007 Round of 32	Mór	1–2	Sopron	Mór
	G. Pongrácz 13'	Report	Sira 3'; Birtalan 89'	Stadium: Táncsics Mihály utcai Pálya; Referee: Krisztián Király

==== Round of 16 ====
24 October 2007 First leg	Honvéd	2–1	Sopron	Budapest
	Bárányos 6'; Dieng 17'	Report	Aquino 83'	Stadium: Bozsik József Stadion; Referee: Krisztián Király

7 November 2007 Second leg	Sopron	0–3 (1–5 agg.)	Honvéd	Sopron
		Report	Guié 11'; Smiljanić 21'; Hercegfalvi 55'	Stadium: Káposztás utcai Stadion; Referee: Ferenc Bede
Note: Honvéd won 5–1 on aggregate.

=== Ligakupa ===
==== Autumn season ====
===== Group stage =====
Pos	Team	Pld	W	D	L	GF	GA	GD	Pts	Qualification	GYO	TAT	MTK	SOP
1	Győr	6	4	0	2	13	8	+5	12	Advance to knockout phase	—	3–0	1–0	1–2
2	Tatabánya	6	3	1	2	13	9	+4	10	Advance to knockout phase	3–1	—	0–0	8–1
3	MTK Budapest	6	2	1	3	8	9	−1	7		2–3	4–1	—	2–1
4	Sopron	6	2	0	4	8	16	−8	6		1–4	0–1	3–0	—

Source: HFF

14 August 2007 1	Győr	1–2	Sopron	Győr
18:00 CEST (UTC+2)	Granát 36'	Report	Birtalan 50'; Dancs 84'	Stadium: ETO Park; Attendance: 400; Referee: Zoltán Iványi

22 August 2007 2	Sopron	0–1	Tatabánya	Sopron
16:00 CEST (UTC+2)		Report	Ferenczi 39'	Stadium: Káposztás utcai Stadion; Referee: Tamás Arany

9 September 2007 3	MTK	2–1	Sopron	Budapest
19:00 CEST (UTC+2)	Lencse 30'; Kecskés 85'	Report	Györök 90+2'	Stadium: Hidegkuti Nándor Stadion; Referee: Tamás Arany

19 September 2007 4	Sopron	3–0	MTK	Sopron
17:00 CEST (UTC+2)	Zana 25' (pen.); Csikós 66'; Birtalan 75'	Report		Stadium: Káposztás utcai Stadion; Referee: István Vad

3 October 2007 5	Sopron	1–4	Győr	Sopron
18:00 CEST (UTC+2)	Dancs 72'	Report	L. Varga 15'; Z. Kovács 48'; Granát 78' (pen.), 90'	Stadium: Káposztás utcai Stadion; Referee: Sándor Andó-Szabó

9 October 2007 6	Tatabánya	8–1	Sopron	Tatabánya
15:00 CEST (UTC+2)	Hajdú 8'; Megyesi 26'; Kriston 28', 55'; P. Horváth 34'; Farkas 48'; Sándor 63'; A. Batics 89'	Report	Giura 12'	Stadium: Stadion Városi; Attendance: 200; Referee: Tamás Arany

==== Spring season ====
===== Group stage =====
Pos	Team	Pld	W	D	L	GF	GA	GD	Pts	Qualification	ZAL	GYO	TAT	SOP
1	Zalaegerszeg	6	4	2	0	19	3	+16	14	Advance to knockout phase	—	1–1	7–0	5–0
2	Győr	6	4	2	0	16	6	+10	14	Advance to knockout phase	1–1	—	3–2	4–1
3	Tatabánya	6	1	0	5	7	19	−12	3		1–2	1–4	—	3–0 (Note: Sopron couldn't finish the 2007–08 season due to bankruptcy. All remaining matches were counted as won for their opponents.)
4	Sopron	6	1	0	5	4	18	−14	3	Exclution	0–3	0–3	3–0	—

Source: HFF
Notes:

1 December 2007 1	Sopron	3–0	Tatabánya	Sopron
13:00 CET (UTC+1)	Belić 34', 55'; Sifter 44'	Report		Stadium: Káposztás utcai Stadion; Referee: Krisztián Király

5 December 2007 2	Zalaegerszeg	5–0	Sopron	Zalaegerszeg
13:00 CET (UTC+1)	Méyé 11'; Pekič 34'; P. Máté I (yellow card) 45'; Vulin (yellow card) 62'; Koplárovics 70', 78'; N. Tóth 83'	Report	Takács (red card) 25'; Tchana (yellow card) 45'	Stadium: ZTE Arena; Attendance: 700; Referee: Krisztián Pánczél

8 December 2007 3	Győr	4–1	Sopron	Győr
13:00 CET (UTC+1)	Koltai 6'; Bajzát 20'; Bogdanović 32', 77'	Report	L. Legoza 66'	Stadium: ETO Park; Referee: Szabolcs Szilasi

19 February 2008 4	Sopron	0–3 (Awarded)	Győr	Sopron
		Report		Stadium: Káposztás utcai Stadion

20 February 2008 5	Tatabánya	3–0 (Awarded)	Sopron	Tatabánya
		Report		Stadium: Stadion Városi

27 February 2008 6	Sopron	0–3 (Awarded)	Zalaegerszeg	Sopron
		Report		Stadium: Káposztás utcai Stadion
