= Norbert Zana =

Hungarian footballer (born 1985)

Personal information
- Date of birth: 20 April 1985 (age 41)
- Place of birth: Budapest, Hungary
- Height: 1.78 m (5 ft 10 in)
- Position: Midfielder

Youth career
- Ferencváros
- MTK
- Honvéd

Senior career*
Years	Team	Apps	(Gls)
2004–2007	Honvéd	30	(0)
2007–2008	Sopron	7	(2)
2007	Sopron II	2	(4)
2008	Rákospalota	6	(0)
2008	Rákospalota II	6	(4)
2008–2009	Szolnok	26	(2)
2009–2010	Dabas	9	(2)
2010	Kozármisleny	9	(1)
2010–2012	Vecsés	40	(6)
2013	Dabas	11	(2)
2013	Hetényegyháza	5	(0)
Total		151	(23)
- * Club domestic league appearances and goals

Norbert Zana (born 20 April 1985) is a Hungarian former professional footballer who played as a midfielder.

== Career ==
Zana made his professional debut for Honvéd on 25 September 2004, replacing Roland Dancs at the 85th minute of a 4–1 away Nemzeti Bajnokság I lose against Fehérvár.

He scored his first professional goals on 25 August 2007 when he scored a brace for Sopron II, in a 5–4 home Nemzeti Bajnokság III win against Csorna.

Nemzeti Bajnokság II club Vecsés terminated his contract with immediate effect in 2012 when, after a long injury, he committed a serious disciplinary offense in his first match, for which he received a three-match ban.

== Career statistics ==
Appearances and goals by club, season and competition
Club	Season	League			Magyar Kupa		Ligakupa		Total	
Club	Season	Division	Apps	Goals	Apps	Goals	Apps	Goals	Apps	Goals
Honvéd	2004–05	Nemzeti Bajnokság I	7	0	—		—		7	0
Honvéd	2005–06	Nemzeti Bajnokság I	14	0	4	0	—		18	0
Honvéd	2006–07	Nemzeti Bajnokság I	9	0	3	0	—		12	0
Honvéd	Total		30	0	7	0	—		37	0
Sopron	2007–08	Nemzeti Bajnokság I	7	2	3	0	7	1	17	3
Sopron II	2007–08	Nemzeti Bajnokság III	2	4	—		—		2	4
Rákospalota	2007–08	Nemzeti Bajnokság I	6	0	—		3	0	9	0
Rákospalota II	2007–08	Nemzeti Bajnokság III	6	4	—		—		6	4
Szolnok	2008–09	Nemzeti Bajnokság II	26	2	2	0	—		28	2
Dabas	2009–10	Nemzeti Bajnokság III	9	2	—		—		9	2
Kozármisleny	2009–10	Nemzeti Bajnokság II	9	1	—		—		9	1
Vecsés	2010–11	Nemzeti Bajnokság II	25	4	1	0	—		26	4
Vecsés	2011–12	Nemzeti Bajnokság II	15	2	—		—		15	2
Vecsés	Total		40	6	1	0	—		41	6
Dabas	2012–13	Nemzeti Bajnokság III	11	2	—		—		11	2
Hetényegyháza	2013–14	Megyei Bajnokság I	5	0	—		—		5	0
Career total			151	23	13	0	10	1	174	24

== Honours ==
Honvéd

- Magyar Kupa: 2006–07
