= Roland Dancs =

Hungarian footballer (born 1985)

Personal information
- Date of birth: 19 April 1985 (age 41)
- Place of birth: Szombathely, Hungary
- Height: 1.72 m (5 ft 8 in)
- Position: Midfielder

Team information
- Current team: Altlengbach-Laabental (manager)

Youth career
- Haladás VSE
- Nancy

Senior career*
Years	Team	Apps	(Gls)
2002–2004	Grasshopper	1	(0)
2004–2007	Honvéd	69	(4)
2007–2008	Sopron	27	(0)
2008–2011	Rákospalota	92	(13)
2011–2013	Zwentendorf	45	(7)
2013	Rust SV	13	(2)
2014–2016	Zwentendorf	49	(10)
2016	Sitzenberg/R.	5	(0)
2016–2018	Radlberg	35	(3)
2018	Maria Anzbach	27	(1)
Total		363	(40)

Managerial career
- 2017: Radlberg
- 2021–2022: Harland
- 2024–: Altlengbach-Laabental
- * Club domestic league appearances and goals

Roland Dancs (born 19 April 1985) is a Hungarian football manager and former professional player, who is currently the manager of Altlengbach-Laabental.

== Career statistics ==
=== As a player ===
Appearances and goals by club, season and competition
Club	Season	League			National cup (Note: Includes Magyar Kupa)		League cup (Note: Includes Ligakupa)		Europe		Other		Total	
Club	Season	Division	Apps	Goals	Apps	Goals	Apps	Goals	Apps	Goals	Apps	Goals	Apps	Goals
Grasshopper	2002–03	Nationalliga A	1	0	—		—		—		—		1	0
Honvéd	2003–04	Nemzeti Bajnokság II	11	1	0	0	—		—		—		11	1
Honvéd	2004–05	Nemzeti Bajnokság I	22	1	3	0	—		4 (Note: Appearances in UEFA Cup)	0	—		29	1
Honvéd	2005–06	Nemzeti Bajnokság I	27	2	6	0	—		—		—		33	2
Honvéd	2006–07	Nemzeti Bajnokság I	9	0	3	0	—		—		—		12	0
Honvéd	Total		69	4	12	0	—		4	0	—		85	4
Sopron	2006–07	Nemzeti Bajnokság I	12	0	—		—		—		—		12	0
Sopron	2007–08	Nemzeti Bajnokság I	15	0	2	0	6	2	—		—		23	2
Sopron	Total		27	0	2	0	6	2	—		—		35	2
Rákospalota	2007–08	Nemzeti Bajnokság I	14	2	—		2	0	—		—		16	2
Rákospalota	2008–09	Nemzeti Bajnokság I	28	5	4	1	8	4	—		—		40	10
Rákospalota	2009–10	Nemzeti Bajnokság II	26	5	2	0	—		—		—		28	5
Rákospalota	2010–11	Nemzeti Bajnokság II	24	1	2	0	—		—		—		26	1
Rákospalota	Total		92	13	8	1	10	4	—		—		110	18
Zwentendorf	2011–12	2. Landesliga West	23	6	—		—		—		—		23	6
Zwentendorf	2012–13	2. Landesliga West	22	1	—		—		—		—		22	1
Zwentendorf	Total		45	7	—		—		—		—		45	7
Rust SV	2013–14	1. Klasse Nordwest-Mitte	13	2	—		—		—		—		13	2
Zwentendorf	2013–14	Gebietsliga Nordwest/Waldviertel	14	5	—		—		—		—		14	5
Zwentendorf	2014–15	Gebietsliga Nordwest/Waldviertel	25	4	—		—		—		—		25	4
Zwentendorf	2015–16	Gebietsliga Nordwest/Waldviertel	10	1	—		—		—		—		10	1
Zwentendorf	Total		49	10	—		—		—		—		49	10
Sitzenberg/R.	2015–16	1. Klasse Nordwest-Mitte	5	0	—		—		—		—		5	0
Radlberg	2016–17	1. Klasse West/Mitte	24	2	—		—		—		1 (Note: Appearance in Lower Austrian Football Cup)	0	25	2
Radlberg	2017–18	2. Klasse Traisental	11	1	—		—		—		—		11	1
Radlberg	Total		35	3	—		—		—		1	0	36	3
Maria Anzbach	2017–18	2. Klasse Traisental	13	0	—		—		—		—		13	0
Maria Anzbach	2018–19	2. Klasse Traisental	14	1	—		—		—		—		14	1
Maria Anzbach	Total		27	1	—		—		—		—		27	1
Career total			363	40	22	1	16	6	4	0	1	0	406	47

=== As a manager ===
As of match played 13 September 2025

Managerial record by team and tenure
Team	From	To	Record					Ref
Team	From	To	P	W	D	L	Win %	Ref
Radlberg	6 October 2017	15 October 2017	2	0	0	2	0.00	
Harland	8 July 2021	12 January 2022	15	4	0	11	26.67	
Altlengbach-Laabental	5 July 2024	Present	31	10	7	14	32.26	
Total			48	14	7	27	29.17	

== Honours ==
=== As a player ===
Grasshopper

- Nationalliga A: 2002–03

Honvéd

- Nemzeti Bajnokság II: 2003–04
- Magyar Kupa: 2006–07
