= 2006–07 Magyar Kupa =

Tournament details
- Country: Hungary

Final positions
- Champions: Budapest Honvéd (6th title)
- Runners-up: Debrecen

The 2006-07 Hungarian Cup (Hungarian: Magyar Kupa) had involved professional teams at all levels throughout the country. The winner of the Hungarian Cup is guaranteed no worse than one of Hungary's two spots in the UEFA Cup. In 2007, Honvéd Budapest won the competition by beating NB I champions VSC Debrecen in the final on May 9, 2007.

== Third round ==
Teams participating in the third round came from the NB I., NB II., NB III., and county (megye) levels.

- Felcsút (II.), Pécsi MFC 0-2
- Létavértes (III.), Vác 0-1
- Törökszentmiklós (III.), MTK Budapest 0-8
- Budakalászi MSE (II.), Paks 0-1
- Monor (III.), Budapest Honvéd 2-6
- Koroncó SE (megye I.), Győr 2-7
- Sárszentmiklósi SE (megye I.), FC Sopron 0-1
- Elmax-Vasas SE (III.), FC Tatabánya 1-2
- Csurgói TK (III.), Kaposvári Rákóczi 0-3
- Andráshida (III.), Zalaegerszegi TE 2-4
- Tuzsér (II.), Rákospalotai EAC 0-3
- Kóka SE (megye I.), Vasas 0-8
- Kaposvölgye (II.), Ferencváros (II.) 1-2
- Berkenye SE (megye I.), Kazincbarcikai SC (II.) 1-1
- Eger (megye I.), Nyíregyháza (II.) 0-4
- Putnok (III.), Bőcs (II.) 6-2
- Kiskőrösi LC (megye I.), Orosháza (II.) 1-4
- Jászapáti VSE (II.), Soroksár (II.) 1-3 (h.u.)
- Karcag (II.), Vecsés FC (II.) 2-1
- Makó (II.), Kecskeméti TE (II.) 2-2 (T.: 5-3)
- Alba Régia FC (megye I.), Dunaújváros (II.) 1-5
- Márkó SE (megye I.), Budafoki LC (II.) 0-4
- Pannonhalma SE (megye I.), Gyirmót SE (II.) 0-6
- FC Ajka (III.), Lombard Pápa Termál (II.) 2-4
- Csesztreg SE (III.), Siófok (II.) 1-1
- Hévíz (II.), Barcs (II.) 2-1
- Tata (III.), Integrál-DAC (II.) 0-5
- Bonyhád-Völgység (III.), Szombathelyi Haladás (II.) 1-0 (1.)
- Baktalórántháza (II.), Diósgyőri VTK 1-3 (2.)

== Fourth round ==
The winners continued on to the fifth round. Of note was second division team Gyirmót SE defeating reigning Hungarian Cup champion Fehérvár.

- Gyirmót SE (II. division), Fehérvár 5-4 (2-1, 3-3, 4-3) - h.u.
- Csesztreg (III. division), Kaposvár 0-3 (0-1)
- Bonyhád (III. division), Sopron 1-6 (0-3)
- Makó (II. division), MTK Budapest 0-6 (0-3)

== Fifth round ==
The first legs were played on November 8, 2006, with the second legs on November 22.

Team 1	Agg.	Team 2	1st leg	2nd leg
Zalaegerszeg	4–4 (a)	Rákospalota	1–0	3–4
Vasas	3–2	Vác	2–1	1–1
Dunaújváros	0–4	Debrecen	0–1	0–3
Ferencváros	4–1	Gyirmót	1–0	3–1
Pápa	2–6	Újpest	0–2	2–4
Győr	1–8	MTK Budapest	1–3	0–5
Sopron	2–6	Diósgyőr	1–2	1–4
Budapest Honvéd	5–1	Kaposvár	1–1	4–0

== Quarter-finals ==
The first legs were played on March 21, 2007, while the second legs were played on April 4. Of note is Újpest FC vs. Debrecen, a rematch from the 2005–06 Hungarian Cup Quarter Finals, where Debrecen beat Újpest 3-0, agg.

Team 1	Agg.	Team 2	1st leg	2nd leg
MTK Budapest	3–4	Budapest Honvéd	2–2	1–2
Ferencváros	3–4	Vasas	0–2	3–2
Újpest	1–3	Debrecen	0–0	1–3
Diósgyőr	5–4	Zalaegerszeg	2–1	3–3

== Semi-finals ==
Team 1	Agg.	Team 2	1st leg	2nd leg
Vasas	1–2	Budapest Honvéd	0–0	1–2
Debrecen	3–2	Diósgyőr	1–0	2–2

== Final ==
9 May 2007
18:30 (UTC+2)

Debrecen	2–2	Budapest Honvéd
Zsolnai 70'; Sidibe 96' (pen.)	Report	Ivancsics 28'; Szabó 103' (pen.)
Penalties
Komlósi (penalty missed); Sidibe (penalty scored); Kiss (penalty missed); Zsolnai (penalty missed)	1–3	(penalty scored) Ivancsics; (penalty scored) Genito; (penalty missed) Ndjodo; (penalty scored) Szabó

Szusza Ferenc Stadium, Budapest
Attendance: 8,000
Referee: Ferenc Bede (Hungary)

== See also ==
- 2006–07 Nemzeti Bajnokság I
- 2006–07 Nemzeti Bajnokság II
- 2006–07 Nemzeti Bajnokság III
