= Sebastian Ianc =

Romanian footballer

Personal information
- Full name: Sebastian Florin Ianc
- Date of birth: 6 December 1986 (age 39)
- Place of birth: Oradea, Romania
- Height: 1.78 m (5 ft 10 in)
- Position: Midfielder

Team information
- Current team: Foresta Tileagd
- Number: 17

Youth career
- Bihor Oradea

Senior career*
Years	Team	Apps	(Gls)
2004–2006	Liberty Salonta	42	(7)
2006–2007	Sopron	6	(0)
2007–2008	Liberty Salonta	19	(0)
2008–2009	Mechel Câmpia Turzii	15	(0)
2009–2011	Silvania Șimleu Silvaniei	23	(1)
2011–2013	Luceafărul Oradea	43	(10)
2013–2014	Bihor Oradea	22	(2)
2014–2015	Botoșani	12	(0)
2015	Brașov	5	(0)
2016	Olimpia Satu Mare	7	(0)
2016–2017	Crișul Sântandrei		
2017	Olimpia Salonta	1	(0)
2018	Viitorul Borș		
2018–2019	Diosig Bihardiószeg	12	(4)
2019–2021	Slovan Valea Cerului	14	(8)
2022	Unirea Valea lui Mihai	21	(7)
2023–	Foresta Tileagd	39	(14)
- * Club domestic league appearances and goals as of 07:51, 22 June 2024 (UTC)

Sebastian Ianc (born 6 December 1986) is a Romanian professional footballer who plays as a midfielder for Liga IV side Foresta Tileagd. In his career, Ianc played for teams such as Liberty Salonta, Luceafărul Oradea, Bihor Oradea or Botoșani, among others.
