= Jimmy Jones Tchana =

French footballer (born 1984)

Personal information
- Full name: Jimmy Jones Tchana
- Date of birth: August 14, 1984 (age 42)
- Place of birth: Paris, France
- Height: 1.82 m (6 ft 0 in)
- Position: Striker

Team information
- Current team: Békéscsaba 1912 Előre SE
- Number: 25

Senior career*
Years	Team	Apps	(Gls)
2003–2005	US Créteil-Lusitanos	4	(0)
2005–2006	Kalamata F.C.	11	(0)
2006–2007	Debreceni VSC	5	(1)
2007–2008	FC Sopron	7	(3)
2008–2009	Diósgyőri VTK	8	(0)
2009–2010	Olympiacos Volos		
2010–2011	Kallithea	11	(0)
2011–	Békéscsaba 1912 Előre SE	13	(5)
- * Club domestic league appearances and goals as of 27 November 2011

Jimmy Jones Tchana (born August 14, 1984), is a French footballer who plays for Békéscsaba 1912 Előre SE in the Hungarian Nemzeti Bajnokság II.

== Career ==
Jimmy made his debut for Debreceni VSC in the Hungarian Borsodi Liga on February 23, 2007 in a 1-0 away win against Vasas SC as a sub, and scored his first goal for Debreceni in his first league match.
