= Danilo Belić =

Serbian footballer

Personal information
- Full name: Danilo Belić
- Date of birth: 10 November 1980 (age 45)
- Place of birth: Vršac, SFR Yugoslavia
- Height: 1.89 m (6 ft 2 1/2 in)
- Positions: Striker; second striker

Senior career*
Years	Team	Apps	(Gls)
2001–2003	Jedinstvo Vršac	12	(28)
2003–2005	Hajduk Kula	19	(6)
2005–2006	Budućnost Banatski Dvor	21	(5)
2006–2007	União Madeira	20	(6)
2007–2008	Sopron	10	(3)
2008–2009	Otopeni	13	(5)
2009–2010	Zhetysu	54	(27)
2011	Lokomotiv Astana	1	(0)
2011	→ Taraz (loan)	10	(3)
2012	→ Zhetysu (loan)	6	(3)
2013	Ordabasy	16	(4)
2014	Akzhayik	9	(5)
- * Club domestic league appearances and goals as of 27 August 2015

Danilo Belić (Serbian Cyrillic: Данило Белић; born November 10, 1980) is a Serbian /Kazakhstani retired footballer.

== Career ==
In February 2012, Belić went on trial with Uzbek League side FC Bunyodkor. Belić joined FC Zhetysu on loan for the remainder of the 2012 season in June 2012. In March 2014, Belić signed a one-year contract with FC Akzhayik of the Kazakhstan First Division, leaving the club in June of the same year.
