= Balázs Venczel =

Hungarian footballer

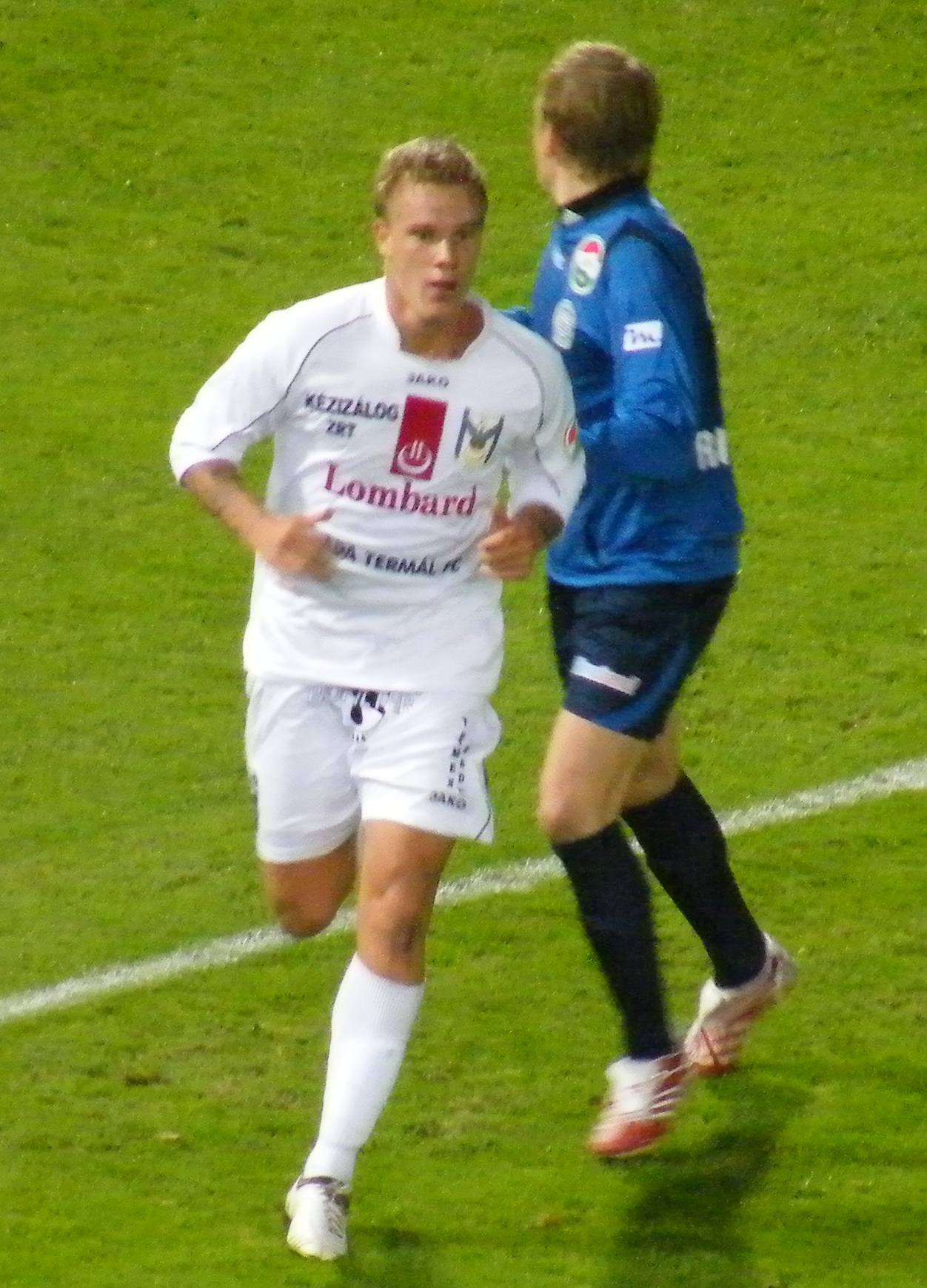

Personal information
- Full name: Balázs Venczel
- Date of birth: 6 March 1986 (age 40)
- Place of birth: Szombathely, Hungary
- Height: 1.82 m (5 ft 11 1/2 in)
- Position: Midfielder

Team information
- Current team: Vasas
- Number: 6

Youth career
- 2000–2003: Szombathely

Senior career*
Years	Team	Apps	(Gls)
2003–2005	Szombathely	16	(1)
2005–2006	Budapest Honvéd	28	(2)
2006–2007	Kaposvár	11	(1)
2007–2008	Felcsút	22	(1)
2008–2012	Pápa	47	(1)
2012–?	Vasas	4	(0)
- * Club domestic league appearances and goals as of 13 November 2012

Balázs Venczel (born 6 March 1986) is a Hungarian football player.
