= Béke téri Stadion =

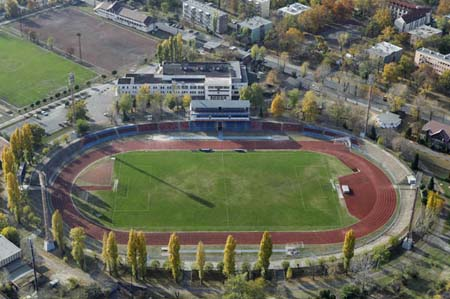
- Interactive map of Béke téri Stadion
- Full name: Béke téri Stadion
- Location: Csepel, Budapest, Hungary
- Coordinates: 47.41897°N 19.07279°E
- Owner: Csepel FC
- Capacity: 12,000
- Surface: Grass; Field
- Record attendance: 35,000 (Csepel vs Ferencváros, 27 June 1948)
- Field size: 105 m × 68 m (344 ft × 223 ft)

Construction
- Groundbreaking: 1940
- Built: 1941

Tenant
- Csepel FC

Website
- www.csepelfc.hu

Béke téri Stadion is a sports venue in Csepel, a district of Budapest, Hungary. The stadium is home to the association football side Csepel FC. The stadium has a capacity of 12,000.

== Photo gallery ==
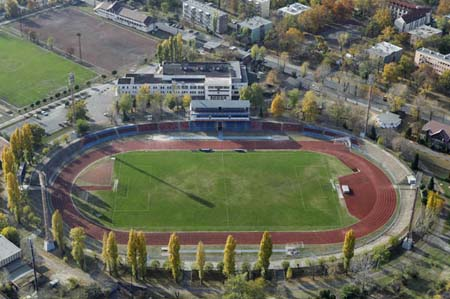
Aerial view

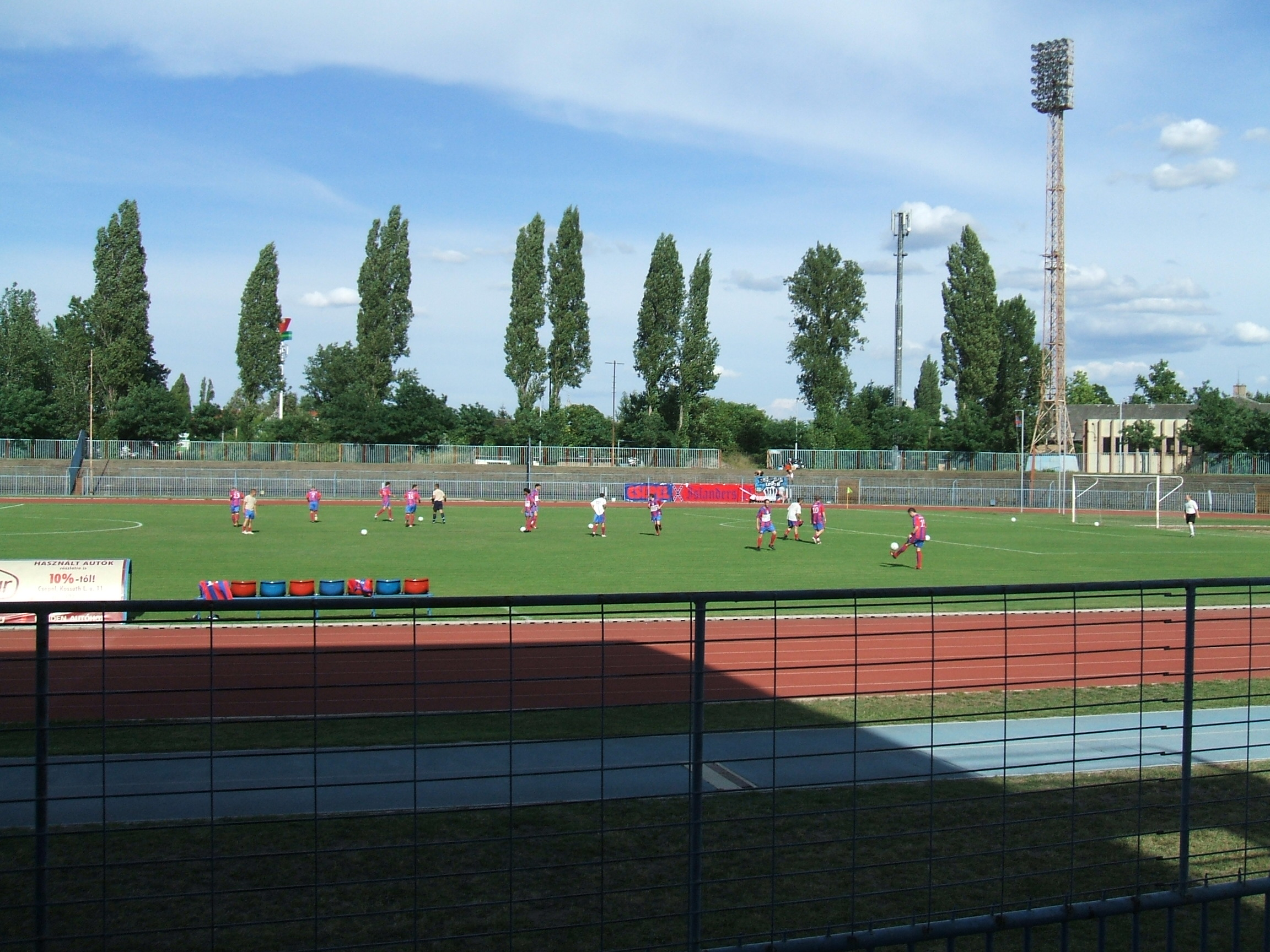
The pitch
