= Norbert Kovács (footballer) =

Hungarian footballer

Personal information
- Date of birth: 13 April 1977 (age 49)
- Place of birth: Székesfehérvár, Hungary
- Height: 1.76 m (5 ft 9 in)
- Position: Midfielder

Senior career*
Years	Team	Apps	(Gls)
1996–2000	III. Kerületi TUE	32	(1)
2000–2001	Csepel SC	?	(?)
2001–2002	BKV Előre SC	?	(?)
2002–	Békéscsabai Előre FC	16 (')	

International career
1996–1997	Hungary U-21	1	(0)
- * Club domestic league appearances and goals as of 31 May 2003

Norbert Kovács (born 13 April 1977) is a Hungarian footballer who plays for Békéscsabai Előre FC as midfielder.
