= Gellért Ivancsics =

Hungarian footballer

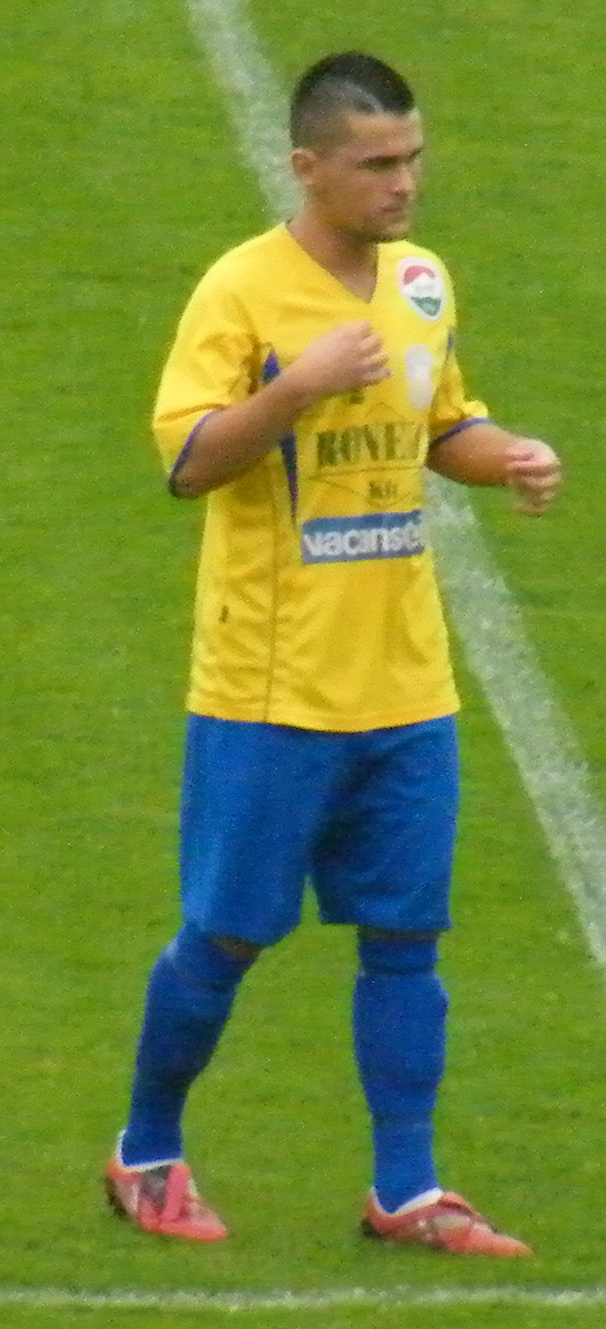

Personal information
- Date of birth: 23 February 1987 (age 39)
- Place of birth: Sopron, Hungary
- Height: 1.68 m (5 ft 6 in)
- Position: Midfielder

Team information
- Current team: SC Kroatisch Minihof
- Number: 23

Youth career
- 2002–2003: Sopron
- 2003–2005: MTK

Senior career*
Years	Team	Apps	(Gls)
2003–2007	MTK	0	(0)
2005	→ Siófok (loan)	3	(0)
2005–2006	→ Sopron (loan)	17	(0)
2007–2009	Honvéd	47	(2)
2009	→ Siófok (loan)	15	(2)
2009–2010	Diósgyőr	11	(3)
2010	→ Szigetszentmiklós (loan)	13	(2)
2010–2011	Zalaegerszeg	0	(0)
2010–2011	→ Siófok (loan)	11	(0)
2011	→ Honvéd (loan)	14	(2)
2011–2013	Honvéd	43	(8)
2013–2014	Pápa	4	(0)
2014–2016	Siófok	67	(17)
2016–2017	Szeged-Csanád	5	(0)
2017	Kaposvári Rákóczi	2	(0)
2018–2019	Pápai		
2019–	SC Kroatisch Minihof	8	(0)
- * Club domestic league appearances and goals as of 21:55, 25 September 2019 (UTC)

Gellért Ivancsics (born 23 February 1987 in Sopron) is a Hungarian football player currently playing for SC Kroatisch Minihof.
