= Iván Tóth =

Hungarian footballer

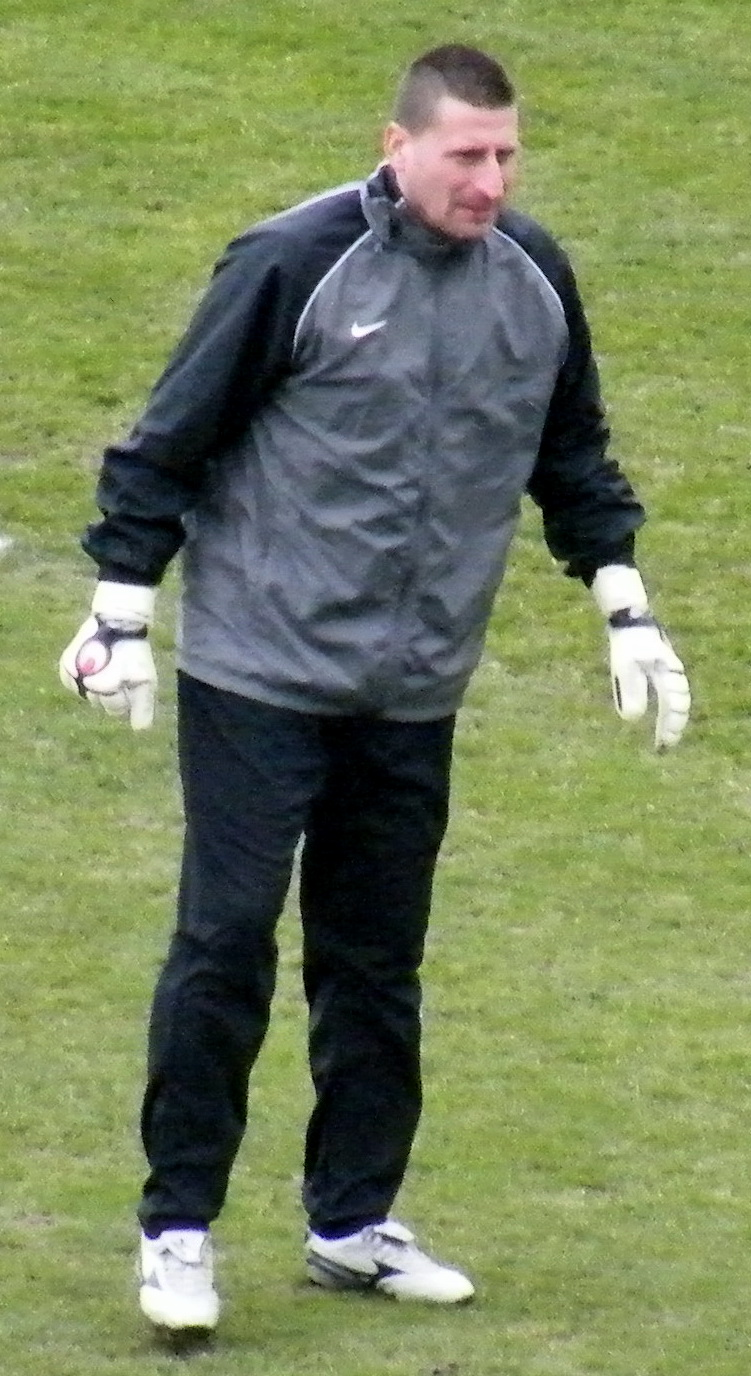

Personal information
- Date of birth: 22 March 1971 (age 55)
- Place of birth: Budapest, Hungary
- Height: 1.85 m (6 ft 1 in)
- Position: Goalkeeper

Senior career*
Years	Team	Apps	(Gls)
1996–1997	Vác	13	(0)
1997–1999	III. Kerület	14	(0)
1999–2000	Törökbálint	?	(?)
2000–2002	Budaörs	?	(?)
2002–2003	Százhalombatta	35	(0)
2003–2004	Szombathely	16	(0)
2004–2005	Pápa	4	(0)
2005–2012	Honvéd	75	(0)
2009–2012	→ Honvéd II	2	(0)
- * Club domestic league appearances and goals as of 24 June 2013

Iván Tóth (born 22 March 1971, Budapest) is a retired Hungarian goalkeeper.

== Club career ==
More Hungarian footballers with a first class were playing in a club. A professional footballer started his career on Vác in 1996, saved in a team with more lower classes then. It returned in 2003 into NB I, where first the Szombathelyi Haladás was a basis man, then the Budapest Honvéd FC was in his team goalkeeper, where there was a later team captain and the team may say thank you for more successes to him.

== Club honours ==
=== III. Kerületi TUE ===
- Hungarian National Championship II:
  - 3rd place: 1997–98

=== Budaörsi SC ===
- Pest Megyei I:
  - Winner: 2001–02

=== Budapest Honvéd FC ===
- Hungarian Cup:
  - Winner: 2006–07, 2008–09
  - Runners-up: 2007–08
- Hungarian Super Cup:
  - Runners-up: 2007, 2009
