= Tibor Szabó (footballer, born 1977) =

Hungarian footballer

Personal information
- Full name: Tibor Szabó
- Date of birth: 12 March 1977 (age 49)
- Place of birth: Sombor, SR Serbia, SFR Yugoslavia
- Height: 1.70 m (5 ft 7 in)
- Position: Midfielder

Youth career
- Jedinstvo Svetozar Miletić
- Partizan

Senior career*
Years	Team	Apps	(Gls)
- Teleoptik
	Vojvodina	0	(0)
- Cement Beočin
1997–1998	Debrecen	16	(2)
1998–1999	Diósgyőr	28	(2)
1999–2001	Budapest Honvéd	29	(1)
2001	Ferencváros	20	(0)
2002	Volgar Astrakhan	15	(2)
2002–2005	Videoton	60	(7)
2005	Lombard-Pápa	13	(1)
2005	Obra Kościan		
2005–2006	Dyskobolia Grodzisk Wielkopolski	16	(0)
2006	Sopron FAC	13	(0)
2007	Budapest Honvéd	12	(1)
2007–2008	Panetolikos	30	(4)
2011–	Unione FC Budapest	334	(87)
- * Club domestic league appearances and goals as of 23 August 2025

Tibor Sabo (Serbian Cyrillic: Тибор Сабо; Hungarian: Szabó Tibor; born 12 March 1977) is a Serbian-born Hungarian footballer who plays as a midfielder. He is the younger brother of Zoltan Sabo.

== Career ==
After he started playing in Serbia at a very young age, he moved in 1997 to Hungary where he played for Debreceni VSC, Diósgyőri VTK, Budapest Honvéd, Ferencvárosi TC, Videoton FC, Lombard-Pápa and Sopron. In between, he played half a season in a Russian Second league club FC Volgar Astrakhan. He also played in places such as Poland, Dyskobolia Grodzisk Wielkopolski, and in Greece for Panetolikos.
