= Zoltán Miski =

Hungarian footballer (born 1983)

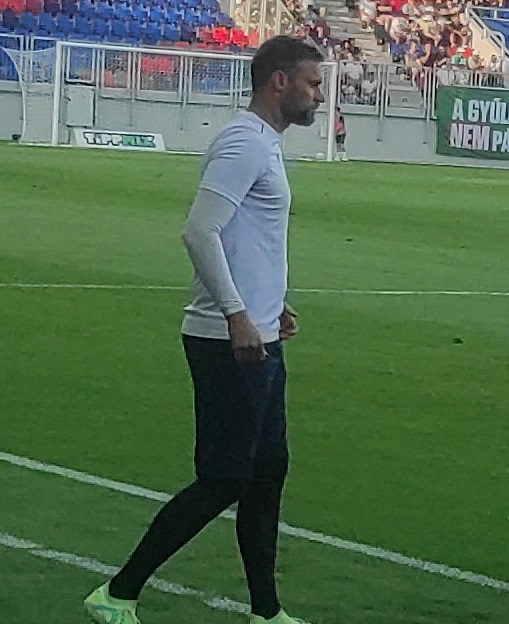
- Miski with Nyíregyháza in 2024

Personal information
- Date of birth: 29 May 1983 (age 43)
- Place of birth: Budapest, Hungary
- Height: 1.90 m (6 ft 3 in)
- Position: Goalkeeper

Youth career
- 1998–2001: Vasas
- 2001–2002: Újpest
- 2002–2003: Fóti SE

Senior career*
Years	Team	Apps	(Gls)
2002–2003	Fóti SE	33	(0)
2003–2004	Újpest	0	(0)
2004	Dabas		
2004–2005	Videoton	0	(0)
2005	Felcsút	14	(0)
2005–2006	Hévíz	15	(0)
2006–2007	Budapest Honvéd	14	(0)
2007–2010	Sparta Prague II		
2007–2008	→ Budějovice (loan)	0	(0)
2008–2009	→ Kladno (loan)	0	(0)
2010	Hévíz	11	(0)
2010–2014	Cegléd	91	(0)
2014–2015	Kazincbarcika	18	(0)
2015–2020	Jászberény	81	(0)
2020–2021	Nyíregyháza	0	(0)
- * Club domestic league appearances and goals

Zoltán Miski (born 29 May 1983) is a former Hungarian professional football player.

== Club career ==
Miski began his professional career with Héviz SE in the NB II, appearing in 15 matches during the 2005–06 season. In January 2006, he transferred to Budapest Honvéd FC in the Hungarian NB I, where he appeared in 14 league matches over the next 18 months. Next, Miski moved to Sparta Prague of the Czech Gambrinus liga, where he spent two unsuccessful seasons out on loan and never appeared in a league match.
