= Attila Dobos =

Hungarian footballer (born 1978)

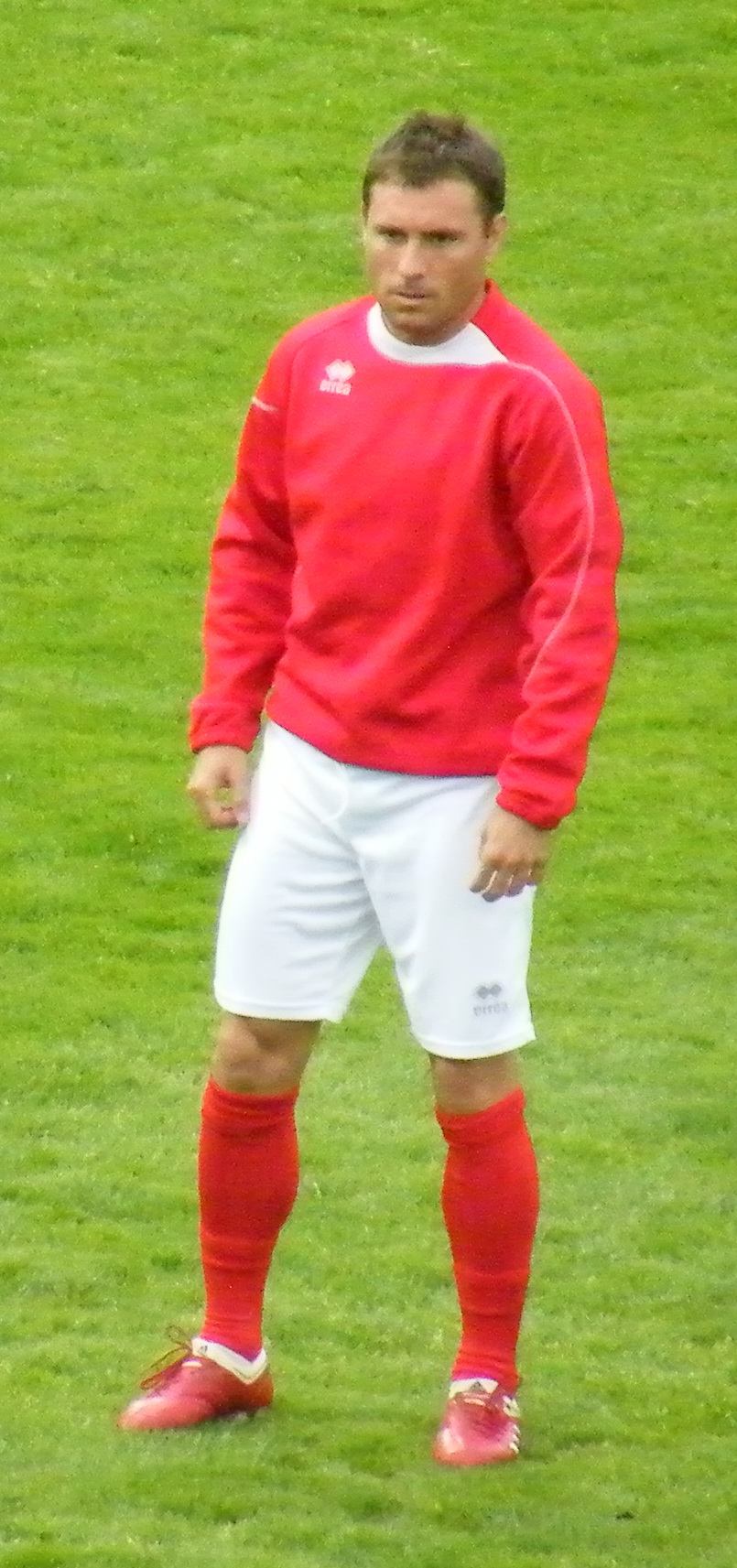
- Dobos in 2010

Personal information
- Full name: Attila Dobos
- Date of birth: 24 November 1978 (age 47)
- Place of birth: Miskolc, Hungary
- Height: 1.70 m (5 ft 7 in)
- Position: Midfielder

Youth career
- 1998–2000: Diósgyőr

Senior career*
| Years | Team | Apps | (Gls) |
| 2000–2002 | Bőcs | 22 | (5) |
| 2002–2003 | Diósgyőr | 24 | (2) |
| 2003–2009 | Budapest Honvéd | 140 | (18) |
| 2009–2010 | Rákospalota | 13 | (1) |
| 2010–2012 | Diósgyőr | 46 | (6) |
| 2012–2014 | Mezőkövesd | 35 | (2) |
| Total | | 280 | (34) |
- * Club domestic league appearances and goals

Attila Dobos (born 24 November 1978) is a Hungarian former professional footballer who works as fitness coach for Nemzeti Bajnokság II club Diósgyőri VTK.

During his career Dobos spent the majority of his playing career as a midfielder and played 153 games in the Nemzeti Bajnokság I, the first tier of Hungarian football. He played the majority of his top tier games for Budapest Honvéd and for Diósgyőri VTK, captaining both. Dobos played his last first league games for Mezőkövesdi SE. He also played professional football for Borsod Volan SE, Bőcs KSC, Rákospalotai EAC, Felsőtárkány SC and Kazincbarcikai SC in the second and third divisions of Hungarian football.

== Early life ==
Dobos was born on 24 November 1978 in Miskolc, Hungary, but grow up in Tiszakeszi, a small village in the south of Borsod-Abaúj-Zemplén County. He started out playing for Mezocsati VSE, the club of a nearby small town Mezőcsát. He was only 16, when the club had financial difficulties and ceased. Dobos and his local, 16–17 years old friends organized a football team in their village, Tiszakeszi and joined Borsod-Abaúj-Zemplén County league III, the lowest tier of Hungarian football and they won the league in their first season.

During a scout game, he was noticed by Andras Balázs, the chairman of Nemzeti Bajnoksag II (which was the third tier in that time) club Borsod Volán SE where he started his professional career. Dobos describe joining Borsod Volán SE as a landmark in his career.

== Playing career ==
=== Diósgyőri VTK and Bőcs KSC ===
When Diósgyőri VTK, the most popular football club of Miskolc was relegated from Nemzeti Bajnokság I, went to bankruptcy and ceased in 2000, the city's second highest ranked club, Dobos's Borsod Volan SE stepped in to save professional football in fourth biggest city of Hungary. The club changed its colours to Diósgyőri VTK's red and white, moved into Diósgyőri Stadion and adopted the name of Diósgyőri VTK. At the end of the season, Diósgyőri VTK finished second and did not promote to Nemzeti Bajnoksag I/B, however with an administrative move, DVTK swopped NBI/B license with then second league club Bőcs KSC. Dobos followed most of his teammates to Bőcs KSC and spent the next season in the third league.

He signed for Diósgyőri VTK again in 2002, and scored two goals in 24 games in the second tier, Nemzeti Bajnoksag I/B.

=== Budapest Honvéd ===
In 2003, Dobos continued his career playing for Budapest Honvéd. They won the second league and promoted to Nemzeti Bajnokság I, where he made his top tier debut in 2004. During his years at Budapest Honvéd, they won Magyar Kupa (Hungarian Cup) twice (2007, 2009). While Dobos was played for them, Budapest Honvéd competed in the UEFA Cup and UEFA Intertoto Cup multiple times, and played against Amica Wronki, Mika-Kasakh Ashtarak, FC Nistru Otaci, Hamburger SV, FC Zhetysu, FK Teplice, and Sturm Graz. He was the captain of Budapest Honvéd for three and a half years.

=== Rákospalotai EAC, Diósgyőri VTK, and Mezőkövesdi SE ===
Dobos left Budapest Honvéd and joined Nemzeti Bajnokság II side Rákospalotai EAC in the summer of 2009, but after half a year he returned to Diósgyőri VTK in 2010, this time in the top tier. At the end of the season, DVTK finished at the bottom of the table and relegated, but after having spent only one year in the second tier they earned their return to the top tier as the champions of 2010–11 Nemzeti Bajnokság II. Dobos played 25 games in the season as part of the starting squad at all of his games.

In the 2011–12 season he played only ten games at the top tier for Diósgyőri VTK, as he went through a knee surgery.

In 2012 Dobos joined Nemzeti Bajnokság II side Mezőkövesdi SE and at the end of the season promoted again to the first tier with his team as the champion of the second tier. This was the third time in his career when he won Nemzeti Bajnokság II, and the first time of Mezőkövesd's history to join the top flight of Hungarian football. In the 2013–14 season, Dobos played 17 games in Nemzeti Bajnokság I for Mezőkövesd, this was the last season when he played in the top tier.

He played two more season for Felsőtárkány SC and Kazincbarcikai SC in the third tier, then retired from professional football in the summer of 2016, aged 38.

== Coaching career ==
In the summer of 2016 Dobos returned to Diósgyőri VTK, this time as a fitness coach. At first, he worked with multiple youth teams and the reserve team. Since the spring of 2017 Dobos has been working as fitness coach of the first team. At the end of the 2021–2022 season of Nemzeti Bajnokság II, when DVTK has failed to promote to Nemzeti Bajnokság I, Dobos quitted the club.

== Personal life ==
Dobos is still active on the amateur level, plays for his childhood club Mezőcsát in the Borsod-Abaúj-Zemplén County league II, which is the 5th tier of the Hungarian football pyramid.
