= Aldo Dolcetti =

Italian footballer and manager (born 1966)

Personal information
- Date of birth: 23 October 1966 (age 60)
- Place of birth: Salò, Italy
- Position: Central midfielder

Team information
- Current team: AC Milan (assistant)

Youth career
- 1983–1986: Juventus

Senior career*
Years	Team	Apps	(Gls)
1984–1986	Juventus	0	(0)
1986–1987	→ Novara (loan)	32	(3)
1987–1991	Pisa	118	(1)
1991–1992	Messina	34	(2)
1992–1993	→ Lucchese (loan)	19	(1)
1993–1997	Cesena	131	(15)
1997–1998	Savoia	21	(0)
1998–1999	Avellino	26	(0)
1999–2000	Cuneo	19	(0)
2000–2001	Sellero Novelle	20	(2)
2001–2002	Darfo Boario	16	(0)

Managerial career
- 2003–2004: Fiorentina (assistant coach)
- 2005: Brescia (assistant coach)
- 2005–2006: Budapest Honvéd
- 2007: Messina (assistant coach)
- 2007: Lecco
- 2008: Siófok
- 2008: MTK Budapest
- 2008–2010: SPAL
- 2011–2013: AC Milan Primavera
- 2013–2014: AC Milan (technical collaborator)
- 2014–2019: Juventus (technical collaborator)
- 2021–2024: Juventus (technical collaborator)
- * Club domestic league appearances and goals

Aldo Dolcetti (born 23 October 1966) is an Italian football manager and former player, who played as a midfielder.

== Career ==
=== Playing career ===
Dolcetti began as a youngster at Juventus but spent a season at Novara before signing for Pisa in 1987. He was a central player for Pisa in two spells in Serie A, before brief spells with Messina and Lucchese. He joined Cesena in 1993 and was, along with Dario Hübner and Emiliano Salvetti, part of a side which came close to promotion to Serie A in 1994. After Cesena's relegation in 1997, he had brief spells at Savoia, Avellino, Cuneo, Sellero Novelle and Darfo Boario.

=== Coaching career ===
After his retired from playing football, Dolcetti was appointed head coach of Budapest Honvéd, Lecco, BFC Siófok, MTK Budapest, SPAL and AC Milan Primavera.
