= Edouard Ndjodo =

Cameroonian footballer

Eddy Ndjodo
Personal information
- Full name: Édouard Ndjodo
- Date of birth: 25 September 1985 (age 41)
- Place of birth: Kumbo, Cameroon
- Height: 1.91 m (6 ft 3 in)
- Position: Forward

Team information
- Current team: Pécsi VSK
- Number: 10

Senior career*
| Years | Team | Apps | (Gls) |
| 2003–2006 | Astres FC | | |
| 2006–2007 | FC Tatabánya | 24 | (4) |
| 2007–2009 | Budapest Honvéd FC | 11 | (2) |
| 2007–2008 | → Ferencvárosi TC (loan) | 25 | (14) |
| 2008–2009 | → BFC Siófok (loan) | 15 | (3) |
| 2010–2011 | SV Horn | 11 | (1) |
| 2011 | Club Africain | 4 | (0) |
| 2011–2012 | FC Tatabánya | 4 | (0) |
| 2012 | Vecsési FC | 12 | (1) |
| 2012 | Nagybátony SC | 13 | (6) |
| 2013 | Panachaiki F.C. | 20 | (3) |
| 2013 | Paniliakos F.C. | 20 | (11) |
| 2014 | Sông Lam Nghệ An F.C. | 13 | (7) |
| 2014– | TDCS Dong Thap F.C. | 14 | (9) |
- * Club domestic league appearances and goals

Édouard Ndjodo (born 25 September 1985) is a Cameroonian footballer who plays for TDCS Dong Thap F.C. in the V.League 2 as a forward.

== Career ==
He played with some big Cameroonian clubs before moving to Hungary in 2005/2006 season. Ndjodjo also played for major clubs in Hungary with good performing and scoring records. He decided to change environment in June 2009 after finishing a 2-year deal with Budapest Honvéd FC, on 26 July 2009, Ndjodo refused to sign for Kecskeméti TE because the club and him did not agree on the contract terms.

Ndjodo was on trial with Yverdon-Sport FC in Switzerland. but unfortunately the club said they could not offer him a contract because he was not fully ready at the moment. Ndjodo returned to Hungary on 24 July 2009 and move on 21 August 2009 to Hibernians F.C. a Maltese football club. On 1 September 2009, Ndjodo decided not to sign the contract with Hibernians F.C., as the contract was not favourable and because he wanted only 1-year deal and Hibernians F.C. insisted on a 2-year deal after a week long trials including 2 crucial matches. He then returned to Hungary On 15 October 2009, was on trial with El Geish an Egyptian premiership club. It was reported that Ndjodo claimed to be sick and decided not to continue with the trial, he then returned to Hungary and follow on 28 November 2009 an invitation from the German club Alemannia Aachen. Ndjodo signed with SV Horn an Austrian 3rd division club on 20 January 2010. In January 2011 he signed a 2-year contract with Club Africain in the Tunisian Ligue Professionnelle 1.
