= Tibor Baranyai =

Hungarian football defender

Personal information
- Full name: Tibor Baranyai
- Date of birth: 29 April 1978 (age 48)
- Place of birth: Budapest, Hungary
- Height: 1.96 m (6 ft 5 in)
- Position: Defender

Team information
- Current team: Soproni VSE
- Number: 19

Senior career*
Years	Team	Apps	(Gls)
1999–2000	Ferencvárosi TC	2	(0)
2000–2001	Kecskeméti TE	?	(?)
2001–2002	BFC Siófok	?	(?)
2002–2003	Győr ETO FC	11	(1)
2003–2005	Vasas SC	1	(0)
2005–2007	Budapest Honvéd FC	35	(2)
2007–2008	Videoton FC	24	(1)
2008–2009	Ferencvárosi TC	9	(0)
2012–	Soproni VSE	8	(0)
- * Club domestic league appearances and goals as of 14 April 2012

Tibor Baranyai (born 29 April 1978 in Budapest) is a Hungarian football defender currently playing for Soproni VSE.
