= Benjamin Angoua =

Ivorian footballer (born 1986)

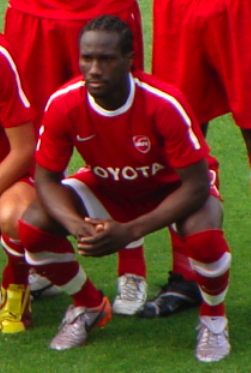
- Angoua with Valenciennes in 2010

Personal information
- Full name: Brou Benjamin Angoua
- Date of birth: 28 November 1986 (age 39)
- Place of birth: Anyama, Ivory Coast
- Height: 1.83 m (6 ft 0 in)
- Position: Centre-back

Team information
- Current team: Stade Briochin
- Number: 4

Youth career
- Toumodi

Senior career*
Years	Team	Apps	(Gls)
2004–2006	Africa Sports	45	(1)
2006–2010	Budapest Honvéd	95	(1)
2010–2014	Valenciennes	113	(3)
2014–2018	Guingamp	61	(1)
2017	→ New England Revolution (loan)	26	(1)
2019–2020	Levadiakos	24	(1)
2020–	Stade Briochin	145	(6)

International career^{‡}
2008	Ivory Coast U23	4	(0)
2008–2014	Ivory Coast	15	(0)
- * Club domestic league appearances and goals as of 23 June 2026 ‡ National team caps and goals as of 11:46, 6 June 2019 (UTC)

Brou Benjamin Angoua (born 28 November 1986) is an Ivorian professional footballer who plays as a centre-back for French Championnat National 1 club Stade Briochin. He is equally adept at playing as either a defensive midfielder or a central defender. He has represented the Ivory Coast national football team at the Olympic Games and the Africa Cup of Nations.

== Club career ==
Born in Anyama, Angoua began his career with local club Toumodi. He also played for Africa Sports National in the Côte d'Ivoire Premier Division.

After two seasons with the club, Angoua moved abroad to play with Budapest Honvéd in Hungary. He spent four years at the club, in which he made over 90 appearances.

In 2010, Angoua moved to France to play with first division club Valenciennes. After a four-season-and-a half at Valenciennes, he signed on to play for Guingamp on 15 July 2014. After two and a half years in Brittany, he signed with New England Revolution on a one-year loan. His loan was not extended following the 2017 season.

On 30 December 2018, he signed a one-and-a-half-year contract with Super League Greece club Levadiakos for an undisclosed fee.

Angoua left Greece at the end of his Levadiakos contract, returning to France to sign a one-year deal with newly promoted Championnat National side Stade Briochin in July 2020.

== International career ==
Angoua represented the Ivory Coast under-23 team at the 2008 Olympic Games, losing in the quarterfinals to Nigeria.

On 18 November 2009, Angoua made his senior team debut in a 2–2 friendly draw against Germany, coming on as a substitute for Cheick Tioté. He scored his first goal in a 2–0 friendly against Rwanda, scoring in the 90th minute.

Angoua was named to the squad for the 2010 Africa Cup of Nations and 2010 FIFA World Cup, but didn't make an appearance in either tournament. He made an appearance for the senior team at the 2012 Africa Cup of Nations, coming on as a substitute for Igor Lolo in a 2–0 win against Angola.

== Personal life ==
Angoua holds both Ivorian and French nationalities.

== Honors ==
Ivory Coast

- Africa Cup of Nations runner-up:2012
