= István Sándor (footballer, born 1986) =

Hungarian footballer (born 1986)

Personal information
- Full name: István Sándor
- Date of birth: 4 January 1986 (age 40)
- Place of birth: Uzhhorod, Ukrainian SSR, Soviet Union
- Height: 1.78 m (5 ft 10 in)
- Position: Central midfielder

Team information
- Current team: Issimo SE

Youth career
- 2003: Újpest
- 2003–2004: Vác
- 2004–2005: Győr ETO

Senior career*
Years	Team	Apps	(Gls)
2005–2006	BKV Előre	28	(3)
2006	Budapest Honvéd	6	(0)
2007	Tatabánya	20	(1)
2008	Fehérvár	0	(0)
2008–2009	Felcsút	24	(3)
2009–2010	Budaörs	32	(4)
2011	Naftan Novopolotsk	13	(2)
2012	Cegléd	14	(4)
2012–2013	Balmazújváros	21	(4)
2013–2014	Nyíregyháza Spartacus	39	(6)
2015	Soroksár	14	(1)
2015	Ajka	8	(1)
2016–2017	Soroksár	47	(5)
2017–2018	Cegléd	24	(2)
2018–2020	Jászberény	46	(2)
2020	Komárom	2	(0)
2020–2021	Tarpa SC	20	(3)
2022	Bánk-Dalnoki Akadémia	8	(2)
2024–	Issimo SE		
- * Club domestic league appearances and goals as of 31 December 2023

István Sándor (born 4 January 1986) is a Hungarian football player who plays for Issimo SE.
