= Káposztás utcai Stadion =

Multi-use stadium in Sopron, Hungary

Coordinates: 47.691710°N 16.583691°E

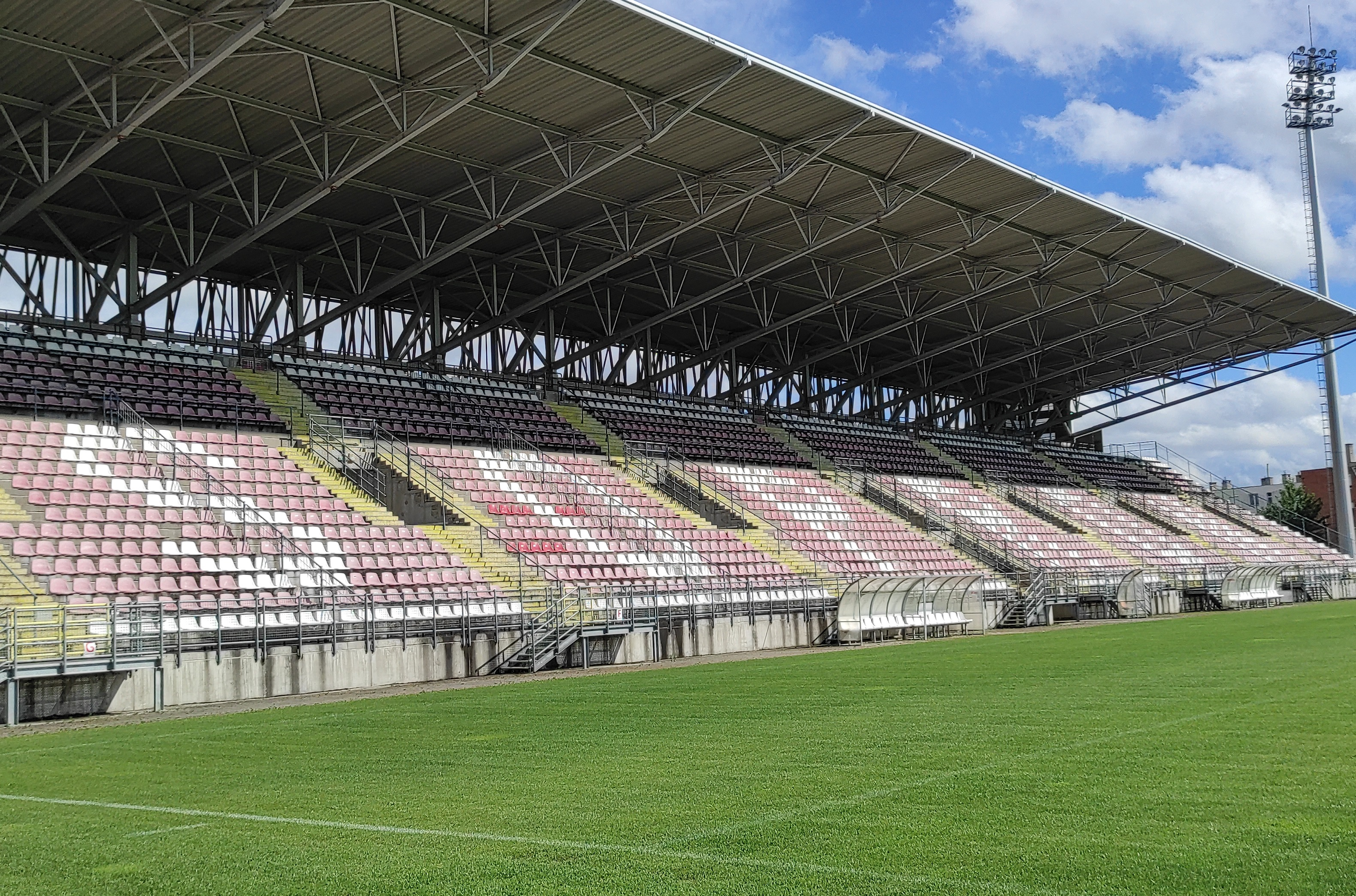
- Interactive map of Káposztás utcai Stadion
- Full name: Káposztás utcai Stadion
- Location: Sopron, Hungary
- Capacity: 4,500
- Surface: Grass; Field
- Field size: 105 m × 68 m (344 ft × 223 ft)

Construction
- Opened: 2003

Tenants
- Soproni FAC; FC Sopron; Soproni VSE; Rákospalota (2008); Szombathelyi Haladás (2016–2017)

The Káposztás utcai Stadion is a multi-use stadium in Sopron, Hungary. It is currently used mostly for football matches and is the home stadium of FC Sopron. The stadium is able to hold 5,300 people and was reconstructed in 2003.

== History ==
The stadium was the temporary home of Nemzeti Bajnokság I football club Rákospalota in the second half of the 2007–08 season.

On 30 September 2015, it was announced that Szombathelyi Haladás would play 6 home matches at the stadium in spring in 2016. Szombathelyi Haladás would host Diósgyőr, Újpest, Békéscsaba, Vasas, Debrecen, and Ferencváros at Káposztás utca during the demolition of Rohonci úti Stadion.

In the 2016–17 Nemzeti Bajnokság I season Szombathelyi Haladás played their home matches in the stadium due to the construction of their new stadium, Haladás Sportkomplexum in Szombathely.
