= Genito =

Mozambican footballer

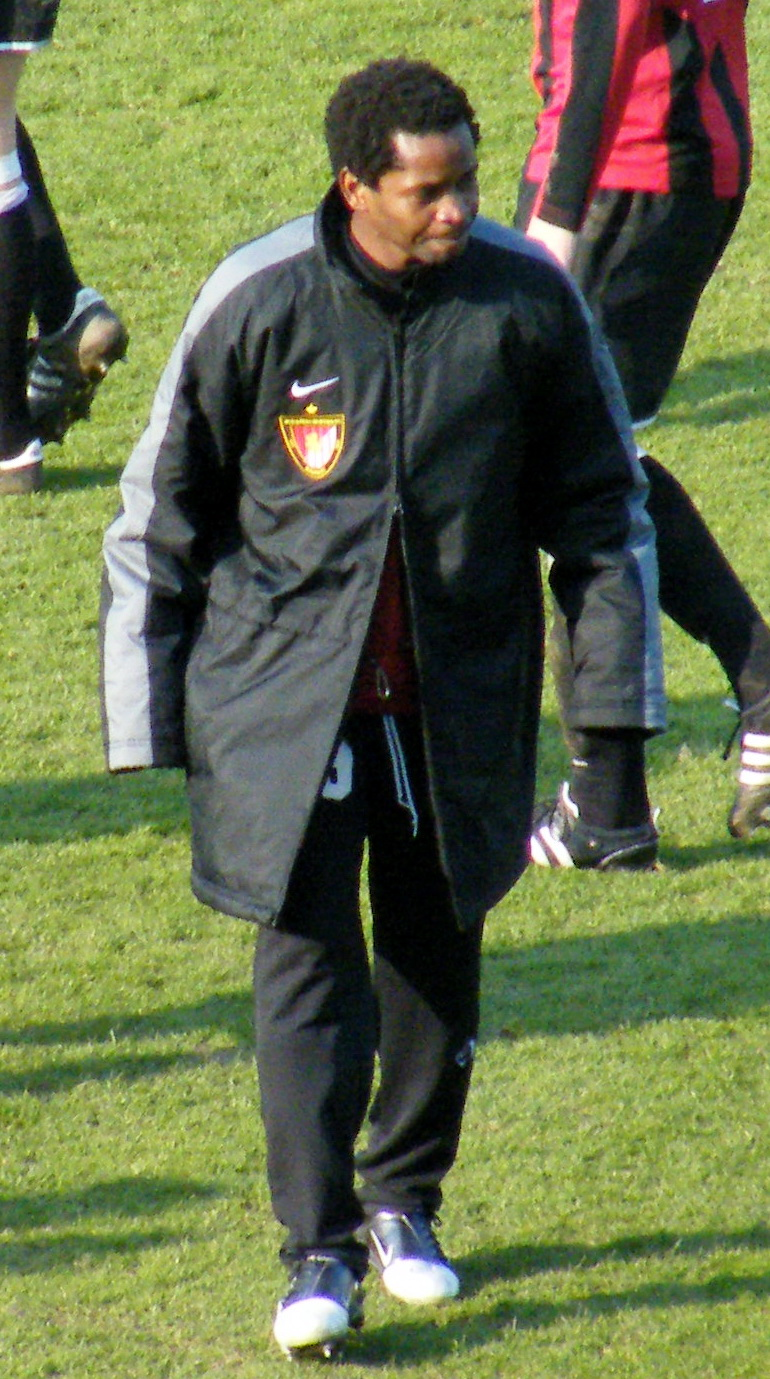

Personal information
- Full name: Eugenio Fernando Bila
- Date of birth: 3 March 1979 (age 47)
- Place of birth: Maputo, Mozambique
- Height: 1.73 m (5 ft 8 in)
- Position: Midfielder

Senior career*
Years	Team	Apps	(Gls)
2001–2004	CD Maxaquene		
2004–2009	Budapest Honvéd	114	(7)
2009–2010	Nea Salamina	19	(0)
2010–2011	Sektzia Ness Ziona	15	(0)

International career^{‡}
2002–2011	Mozambique	41	(1)
- * Club domestic league appearances and goals as of 26 October 2009 ‡ National team caps and goals as of 10 December 2009

Eugénio Fernando Bila (born 3 March 1979), commonly known as Genito, is a Mozambican former footballer who played as a midfielder. He represented The Black Mambas at 2010 African Cup of Nations.

== Honours ==
Budapest Honvéd

- Hungarian Cup: 2007, 2009
