= Bozsik József Stadion =

Football stadium in Budapest, Hungary

Coordinates: 47°26′33″N 19°09′18″E

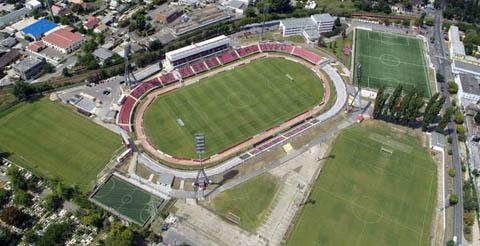
- Aerial View
- Interactive map of Bozsik József Stadion
- Location: Kispest, Budapest, Hungary
- Capacity: 9,500

Construction
- Built: 1913
- Renovated: 1926, 1939, 1945, 1955, 1986, 2006
- Closed: 2019
- Demolished: 2019

Tenants
- Budapest Honvéd FC; MTK Budapest (2014–2015)

The Bozsik József Stadion was a multi-use UEFA category 4 stadium in Budapest, Hungary. The old stadium was demolished completely in 2019. It was used for football matches and was the home stadium of Budapest Honvéd FC. The stadium had a capacity of 8,760 spectators.

== History ==
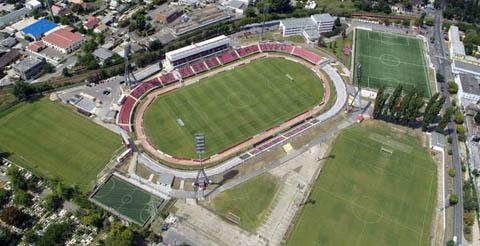
The old Bozsik stadion, now completely demolished

Near the present day stadium (at the site of the cemetery) the first own football ground of the club was built. An estate was donated to KAC at the end of Sárkány (Dragon) Street by its supporters. A fundraiser was initiated among local craftsmen and tradesmen and it was Ferenc Polacsek (hotel owner) and Ferenc Herbacsek (wood trader) who gave major financial contributions to build the sports complex. The inauguration of the Sárkány Street complex was in 1913, hence the name Dragon's Cave - given later by the visiting teams.

On 18 November 1926, Kispest city voted to give 500 million Hungarian korona to modernize the Sárkány Street football grounds. In 1935 the wooden stands and the buildings burned down. Under the leadership of Chairman József Molnár, a larger and more modern stadium was constructed. The new Kispest AC sports complex was inaugurated on 2 January 1938. The new arena is situated at the tram no. 42 terminal and it had a capacity of 8.000 (5.000 seats and 3.000 stands). A bath house was also established in the same site, but it is now closed.

On 12 February 1939 a new football stadium was inaugurated with a capacity of 15.000.

In 1945, right after the war, the people of Kispest started reconstruction works: the grass was regrown and the concrete roofs was mended. Training grounds were expanded to cover a larger area adjacent to the cemetery.

In 1955, the complex was rebuilt and extended; the team had to play all of its matches away.

On 20 May 1967, the lights were inaugurated with a friendly match against Szombathelyi Haladás. The stadium had a capacity of 25.000. The team could train in grass and in clay.

The stadium was named after József Bozsik, who made 101 appearances for the national team.

On 1 October 1986, a show preceded the Bp. Honvéd-Bröndby European Cup match inaugurating Bozsik Stadium. Before kick off, Lajos Tichy said a few words on behalf of the players, and Chairman Sándor Kiss also gave a speech. The stadium was given new, stronger lights for this occasion and the grass was also replaced with a new variety. Furthermore, a heating system was installed under the pitch. The field was made longer and wider. A 20-room hotel was also built inside the stadium with a restaurant seating 200.

In 1990 the locker rooms and bathrooms were renewed. The old gym-hall was turned into a VIP club.

16 years later, they fell into disrepair when the new club owner George Hemingway initiated plans for redevelopment of the stadium, resulting in a new design with a capacity of 10,000. (6,000 seats, 4.000 standing places).

On 5 August 2018, the last match was played at the stadium. The match was won by Honvéd against Paksi FC on the 3rd match day of the 2018–19 Nemzeti Bajnokság I. The only goal was scored by Danilo Cirino de Oliveira in the 48th minute. The referee was Viktor Kassai.

== Milestone matches ==
5 August 2018	Budapest Honvéd	1–0	Paks	2018-19 Nemzeti Bajnokság I Last Nemzeti Bajnokság match
	Danilo 48'	(Report)		Attendance: TBA; Referee: Viktor Kassai (Hungarian Football Federation)

14 March 2018	Budapest Honvéd	0–0	Debrecen	2017–18 Magyar Kupa; Last Magyar Kupa match
16:00 CET		Report		Attendance: 1178; Referee: Csaba Pintér (referee) (Hungarian Football Federation)

== Attendances ==
As of 29 June 2017.

Season	Average
2010–11	1,913
2011–12	2,470
2012–13	1,830
2013–14	1,405
2014–15	977
2015–16	1,711
2016–17	2,760
