= FC Sopron =

Hungarian football club

Football Club Sopron
- Full name: Football Club Sopron
- Founded: 1921; 105 years ago 2018; 8 years ago (refounded)
- Ground: Káposztás utca, Sopron
- Capacity: 5,300
- League: NB III
- 2025–26: NB III, Northwest, 13th of 16
Home colours	Away colours	Third colours

FC Sopron is a Hungarian football club from the town of Sopron, near the Austrian border. It was founded in 1921 as Soproni Postás. The club's home stadium is Stadion Városi with a capacity of 5,300. The Club has won 1 major trophy in his history, the Magyar Kupa.

== History ==
Sopron won the 1993–94 Nemzeti Bajnokság III season and were promoted to the second tier.

On 11 May 2005, Sopron beat Ferencváros 5–1 in the Magyar Kupa at the Sóstói Stadion.

With the beginning of the season 2007/08 Lajos Détári was appointed for being the head coach. After Antonio Righi bought the club Détári was fired (without getting paid for his work) and replaced by now head coach Vincenzo Cosco. In January 2008 their license was withdrawn by the league over unpaid taxes and payments. It was agreed that they would remain in 1. Liga for 2007/08 with 0 points for the season, all points being awarded to their opponents. It finally went to bankruptcy and was dissolved in January 2008. It was replaced with newly founded Soproni VSE and climbed to NB II after winning Bakony Group of NB III in 2010–11 season.

== Ownership ==
The club, which as commercial entity is called AZ FC Sopron Futball Sportszolgáltató KFT., is 79% owned by Antonio Righi. He bought the club from László Máriusz Vizer in 2007. 21% of the club are held by Sopron MJV Önkormányzata.

== Honours ==
=== League ===
- Nemzeti Bajnokság III:
  - Winners (1): 1993–94

=== Cup ===
- Magyar Kupa:
  - Winners (1): 2004–05

== Naming history ==
- 1921: Sopron Soproni Sport Egyesület
- 1945: Soproni Postás Soproni Postás Sport Egyesület
- 1991: Soproni TSE Soproni Távközlési Sport Egyesület
- 1994: MATÁV Sopron Magyar Távközlési Vállalat Sport Club Sopron
- 1998: MATÁV Sopron Magyar Távközlési Vállalat Football Club Sopron
- 2000: MATÁV Compaq Sopron Magyar Távközlési Vállalat Football Club Compaq Sopron
- 2002: MATÁV Sopron Magyar Távközlési Vállalat Football Club Sopron
- 2005: Sopron Football Club Sopron
- 2008: ------

== European cup history ==
=== UEFA Intertoto Cup ===
Season	Competition	Round	Country	Club	Home	Away	Aggregate
2004	UEFA Intertoto Cup	1. Round	(Czech Republic)	FK Teplice	1–0	1–3	2–3
2006	UEFA Intertoto Cup	2. Round	(Turkey)	Kayserispor	3–3	0–1	3–4

=== UEFA Cup ===
Season	Competition	Round	Country	Club	Home	Away	Aggregate
2005–06	UEFA Cup	2. Qualifying Round	(Ukraine)	FC Metalurh Donetsk	0–3	1–2	1–5

== Managers ==
- (Hungary) István Reszeli Soós (2000–2001)
- (Hungary) György Bognár (2002)
- (Hungary) András Komjáti (2002–2003)
- (Hungary) Attila Pintér (2003)
- (Hungary) László Dajka (2003–2004)
- (Hungary) Attila Pintér (2004–2005)
- (Hungary) János Csank (2005)
- (Romania) Tibor Selymes (2005–2006)
- (Hungary) Csaba László (2006)
- (Italy) Dario Bonetti (2006)
- (Romania) Tibor Selymes (2006)
- (Italy) Roberto Landi (2006)
- (Romania) Tibor Selymes (2006)
- (Hungary) Aurél Csertői (2006–2007)
- (Italy) Dario Bonetti (2007)
- (Hungary) Lajos Détári (2007)
- (Italy) Vincenzo Cosco (2007–2008)

== Seasons ==
The table below shows the seasons of FC Sopron.

Season	Tier	Club's name	Position	Pts
1945–46	3	Soproni Postás SK	3 / 9	22
1946–47	4	Soproni Postás SK	12 / 12	8
1947–48	5	Soproni Postás SK	1 / 14	42
1948–49	4	Soproni Postás SK	16 / 16	7
1949–50	4	Soproni Postás	11 / 15	19
1950	4	Soproni Postás	14 / 14	2
1951	4	Soproni Postás	0 / 8	
1952	4	Soproni Postás	2 / 9	23
1953	3	Soproni Postás	7 / 12	24
1954	3	Soproni Postás	8 / 12	20
1955	4	Soproni Postás SK	1 / 18	
1956	3	Soproni Postás	14 / 16	18
1957	3	Soproni Postás SK	6 / 6	1
1957–58	4	Soproni Postás SK	12 / 16	23
1958–59	4	Soproni Postás	16 / 16	18
1959–60	5	Soproni Postás SK	1 / 14	30
1960–61	4	Soproni Postás	11 / 17	22
1961–62	4	Soproni Postás	12 / 17	25
1962–63	4	Soproni Postás	2 / 17	39
1963	5	Soproni Postás	3 / 8	16
1964	5	Soproni Postás SK	7 / 16	32
1965	5	Soproni Postás	7 / 16	28
1966	5	Soproni Postás SK	14 / 16	21
1967	5	Soproni Postás	6 / 16	36
1968	5	Soproni Postás	11 / 16	24
1969	5	Soproni Postás SK	10 / 16	26
1970	5	Soproni Postás	14 / 16	9
1970–71	5	Soproni Postás SK	15 / 16	19
1971–72	5	Soproni Postás	13 / 16	21
1972–73	5	Soproni Postás	14 / 14	15
1973–74	6	Soproni Postás	2 / 14	32
1974–75	5	Soproni Postás	1 / 16	46
1975–76	4	Soproni Postás	9 / 16	26
1976–77	4	Soproni Postás	14 / 18	28
1977–78	4	Soproni Postás	8 / 18	35
1978–79	3	Soproni Postás	15 / 18	24
1979–80	3	Soproni Postás	14 / 18	26
1980–81	3	Soproni Postás SK	7 / 18	42
1981–82	4	Soproni Postás SK	1 / 16	48
1982–83	3	Soproni Postás SK	6 / 18	36
1983–84	3	Soproni Postás SK	13 / 18	30
1984–85	3	Soproni Postás	10 / 18	31
1985–86	3	Soproni Postás SK	14 / 18	31
1986–87	3	Soproni Postás SK	14 / 18	29
1987–88	3	Soproni Postás	17 / 18	25
1988–89	4	Soproni Postás	1 / 16	47
1989–90	3	Soproni Postás	15 / 16	27
1990–91	4	Soproni Távközlési SE	9 / 16	32
1991–92	4	Soproni Távközlési SE	1 / 16	53
1992–93	3	Soproni Távközlési SE	3 / 16	37
1993–94	3	Soproni Távközlési SE	1 / 16	44
1994–95	2	MATÁV SC Sopron	11 / 16	35
1995–96	2	Matáv SC Sopron	2 / 16	59
1996–97	2	Matáv SC Sopron	6 / 16	48
1997–98	2	Matáv SC Sopron	4 / 20	67
1998–99	2	Matáv SC Sopron	5 / 20	62
1999–00	2	Matáv Sopron FC	2 / 20	78
2000	1	MATÁV Compaq-Sopron	4 / 8	20
2000–01	1	MATÁV Compaq-Sopron	9 / 12	30
2001–02	1	MATÁV Compaq-Sopron	9 / 12	44
2001–02	1	MATÁV Compaq-Sopron	7 / 12	40
2002–03	1	Matáv FC Sopron	9 / 12	36
2002–03	1	Matáv FC Sopron	9 / 12	23
2003–04	1	Matáv FC Sopron	5 / 12	48
2004–05	1	Matáv FC Sopron	7 / 16	42
2005–06	1	FC Sopron	10 / 16	35
2006–07	1	FC Sopron	10 / 16	37
2007–08	1	FC Sopron	16 / 16	0
