= 2006–07 FC Fehérvár season =

Fehérvár
2006–07 season
- Manager: Aurél Csertői (until 19 October 2006); Zoltán Németh (caretaker, from 19 October 2006 to 23 October 2006); Marijan Vlak (from 23 October 2006)
- Stadium: Sóstói Stadion
- Nemzeti Bajnokság I: 6th
- Magyar Kupa: Round of 32
- Szuperkupa: Runners-up
- UEFA Cup: Second qualifying round
- Highest home attendance: 4,500 v Újpest (17 November 2006, Nemzeti Bajnokság I)
- Lowest home attendance: 700 v Paks (3 March 2007, Nemzeti Bajnokság I)
- Average home league attendance: 1,973
- Biggest win: 2–0 v Paks (Away, 27 August 2006, Nemzeti Bajnokság I); 2–0 v Vasas (Home, 9 September 2006, Nemzeti Bajnokság I); 2–0 v Tatabánya (Home, 13 October 2006, Nemzeti Bajnokság I); 2–0 v Diósgyőr (Home, 3 November 2006, Nemzeti Bajnokság I); 3–1 v Sopron (Home, 10 December 2006, Nemzeti Bajnokság I); 2–0 v Dunakanyar-Vác (Away, 31 March 2007, Nemzeti Bajnokság I); 5–3 v MTK (Home, 29 April 2007, Nemzeti Bajnokság I); 2–0 v Újpest (Away, 21 May 2007, Nemzeti Bajnokság I)
- Biggest defeat: 0–4 v Debrecen (Home, 6 April 2007, Nemzeti Bajnokság I)

The 2006–07 season was Football Club Fehérvár's 38th competitive season, 7th consecutive season in the Nemzeti Bajnokság I and 64th year in existence as a football club. In addition to the domestic league, Fehérvár participated in that season's editions of the Magyar Kupa and the UEFA Cup.

== Squad ==
Squad at end of season

Note: Flags indicate national team as defined under FIFA eligibility rules; some limited exceptions apply. Players may hold more than one non-FIFA nationality.

No.	Pos.	Nation	Player
1	GK	HUN	Péter Erdei
3	DF	HUN	Zsolt Fehér
4	DF	HUN	Attila Mészáros
6	MF	HUN	Zoltán Schwarcz
7	FW	HUN	Dávid Disztl
8	MF	HUN	Norbert Lattenstein
10	MF	HUN	Zsolt Dvéri
12	GK	HUN	Zsolt Sebők
13	MF	HUN	Gábor Kocsis
14	MF	HUN	Balázs Farkas
16	FW	HUN	Ádám Csobánki
17	DF	HUN	Ákos Koller

No.	Pos.	Nation	Player
18	FW	HUN	Ferenc Horváth
20	MF	BIH	Mario Božić
21	FW	BIH	Jusuf Dajić
22	MF	HUN	Dániel Nagy
25	DF	HUN	Viktor Vadász
26	DF	HUN	Tibor Baranyai
29	DF	HUN	Dávid Mohl
30	GK	HUN	Ádám Viniczai
31	FW	HUN	Lajos Terjék
33	DF	HUN	Gábor Horváth
74	MF	BRA	Julinho
77	DF	HUN	Attila Kuttor

== Competitions ==
=== Overview ===
Competition	First match	Last match	Starting round	Final position	Record							
Competition	First match	Last match	Starting round	Final position	Pld	W	D	L	GF	GA	GD	Win %
Nemzeti Bajnokság I	31 July 2006	26 May 2007	Matchday 1	6th	30	13	5	12	45	43	+2	43.33
Magyar Kupa	18 October 2006	18 October 2006	Round of 32	Round of 32	1	0	0	1	4	5	−1	0.00
Szuperkupa	17 July 2006	20 July 2006	Final	Runners-up	2	0	0	2	1	3	−2	0.00
UEFA Cup	13 July 2006	24 August 2006	First qualifying round	Second qualifying round	4	1	1	2	3	5	−2	25.00
Total					37	14	6	17	53	56	−3	37.84

Source: Competitions

=== Nemzeti Bajnokság I ===
==== League table ====
Pos	Team	Pld	W	D	L	GF	GA	GD	Pts	Qualification or relegation
4	Újpest	30	15	4	11	39	32	+7	46 (Note: Újpest were deducted three points due to federation decision.)	
5	Vasas	30	13	6	11	43	41	+2	45	
6	Fehérvár	30	13	5	12	45	43	+2	44	
7	Kaposvár	30	12	5	13	40	36	+4	41	
8	Honvéd	30	11	8	11	48	43	+5	41	Qualification for the UEFA Cup first qualifying round (Note: Honvéd qualified for the UEFA Cup first qualifying round as the 2006–07 Magyar Kupa winners.)

Source: soccerway.com

==== Results summary ====
Overall								Home						Away					
Pld	W	D	L	GF	GA	GD	Pts	W	D	L	GF	GA	GD	W	D	L	GF	GA	GD
30	13	5	12	45	43	+2	44	9	3	3	29	21	+8	4	2	9	16	22	−6

Source: Hungarian Football Federation

==== Results by round ====
Round	1	2	3	4	5	6	7	8	9	10	11	12	13	14	15	16	17	18	19	20	21	22	23	24	25	26	27	28	29	30
Ground	H	A	H	A	H	A	H	A	H	H	A	H	A	H	A	A	H	A	H	A	H	A	H	A	A	H	A	H	A	H
Result	L	L	D	W	W	L	W	L	W	W	W	W	L	W	L	L	W	L	D	D	L	W	L	L	D	W	L	W	W	D
Position	9	15	14	10	6	7	7	8	7	5	5	4	5	5	5	5	5	6	5	5	7	5	7	7	6	6	6	6	5	6
Points	0	0	1	4	7	7	10	10	13	16	19	22	22	25	25	25	28	28	29	30	30	33	33	33	34	37	37	40	43	44

Source: Matches
A = Away; H = Home; W = Win; D = Draw; L = Loss

==== Matches ====
31 July 2006 1	Fehérvár	2–3	Zalaegerszeg	Székesfehérvár
20:00 CEST (UTC+2)	Sitku 45', 73'	Report	Ljubojević 49', (yellow card) 80'; L. Nagy 54'; Józsi 70'	Stadium: Sóstói Stadion; Attendance: 3,000; Referee: Sándor Andó-Szabó; Assistant referees: Imre Attila Nagy, Dr. Péter Kovács; Fourth official: József Berger

5 August 2006 2	Sopron	2–1	Fehérvár	Sopron
20:00 CEST (UTC+2)	Munteanu (yellow card) 6'; Bagoly (red card) 12'; A. Horváth I 45', 90+3', (yellow card) 83'	Report	Koller (yellow card) 33'; Božić (yellow card) 53'; G. Horváth II 78'	Stadium: Káposztás utcai Stadion; Attendance: 3,200; Referee: István Vad; Assistant referees: Zoltán Kovács, Szabolcs Deutsch; Fourth official: Péter Herbály

19 August 2006 3	Fehérvár	2–2	Pécs	Székesfehérvár
19:00 CEST (UTC+2)	B. Farkas II 47'; Sitku 82'	Report	Pest 15'; Szekeres (yellow card) 37'; Nógrádi 45'; Pavičević (yellow card) 57'; Herbert (yellow card) 80'	Stadium: Sóstói Stadion; Attendance: 2,500; Referee: Sándor Gergely; Assistant referees: Zsolt Szalai, Szabolcs Deutsch; Fourth official: Attila Lidi

27 August 2006 4	Paks	0–2	Fehérvár	Paks
17:30CEST (UTC+2)	Belényesi (yellow card) 36'; Kóczián (yellow card) 89'	Report	Schwarcz (yellow card) 23'; Csizmadia 47'; Božić (yellow card) 60'; Sitku 67' (pen.)	Stadium: Fehérvári úti Stadion; Attendance: 3,000; Referee: Viktor Kassai; Assistant referees: Gábor Erős, Zoltán Szalai; Fourth official: Csaba Ursprung

9 September 2006 5	Fehérvár	2–0	Vasas	Székesfehérvár
19:00 CEST (UTC+2)	Mohl (yellow card) 30', (goal) 40'; Zs. Fehér 66'	Report	Kincses (yellow card) 23'; N. Németh (yellow card) 30'; A. Tóth (yellow card) 56'	Stadium: Sóstói Stadion; Attendance: 2,500; Referee: Péter Solymosi; Assistant referees: Gábor Takács, Oszkár Lémon; Fourth official: Krisztián Király

16 September 2006 6	Kaposvár	1–0	Fehérvár	Kaposvár
19:00 CEST (UTC+2)	Zahorecz 15'; Suljić (yellow card) 16'; Andruskó (yellow card) 28'; Kovácsevics (yellow card) 52'; Vasiljević (red card) 78'	Report	Csizmadia (yellow card) 83'	Stadium: Rákóczi Stadion; Attendance: 2,000; Referee: Ferenc Bede; Assistant referees: Dr. Péter Szabó, Balázs Huszár; Fourth official: Gergely Sulyok

23 September 2006 7	Fehérvár	1–0	Dunakanyar-Vác	Székesfehérvár
19:00 CEST (UTC+2)	Lattenstein 12', (yellow card) 16'	Report	P. Farkas (yellow card) 35'	Stadium: Sóstói Stadion; Attendance: 2,000; Referee: Sándor Andó-Szabó; Assistant referees: István Tóth, Dr. Zsolt Varga; Fourth official: Attila Hegedűs

30 September 2006 8	Debrecen	3–1	Fehérvár	Debrecen
18:00 CEST (UTC+2)	Sidibe 16', 51', 90'; T. Sándor (yellow card) 85' (yellow-red card) 87'; Komlósi (yellow card) 90'; Bernáth (yellow card) 90+2'	Report	Györök (yellow card) 28'; Sitku 61'; Terjék (yellow card) 86'; Kuttor (yellow card) 86'	Stadium: Oláh Gábor utcai Stadion; Attendance: 7,000; Referee: István Vad; Assistant referees: Attila Kelemen, Tibor Vígh; Fourth official: László Varga

13 October 2006 9	Fehérvár	2–0	Tatabánya	Székesfehérvár
19:00 CEST (UTC+2)	Sitku 18'; B. Farkas II (yellow card) 63'; Alumona 69'	Report	Nečas (yellow card) 18'; Kerényi (yellow card) 66'; Filó (yellow card) 77'	Stadium: Sóstói Stadion; Attendance: 1,500; Referee: Mihály Fábián; Assistant referees: Dr. Péter Kovács, Imre Attila Nagy; Fourth official: Zsolt Kovács

21 October 2006 10	Fehérvár	1–0	Honvéd	Székesfehérvár
18:00 CEST (UTC+2)	Kocsis (yellow card) 44'; Božić (yellow card) 59'; Sitku (yellow card) 62'; Csizmadia 83'	Report	Bartyik (yellow card) 19'; Genito (yellow card) 39'; Schindler (yellow card) 48'; Csobánki (yellow card) 83'	Stadium: Sóstói Stadion; Attendance: 2,000; Referee: Péter Solymosi; Assistant referees: Dr. Péter Szabó, György Ring; Fourth official: Csaba Pintér

27 October 2006 11	MTK	0–1	Fehérvár	Budapest
19:00 CEST (UTC+2)	Pál (yellow card) 89'	Report	Mohl (yellow card) 9'; Kocsis (yellow card) 50'; Dvéri 56'; B. Farkas II (yellow card) 65'; Terjék (yellow card) 79'	Stadium: Hidegkuti Nándor Stadion; Attendance: 2,000; Referee: Sándor Andó-Szabó; Assistant referees: Zsolt Szpisják, Tibor Vígh; Fourth official: András Sóthy

3 November 2006 12	Fehérvár	2–0	Diósgyőr	Székesfehérvár
19:00 CET (UTC+1)	Sitku 54', 89'; Božić (yellow card) 76'	Report	Buz (yellow card) 23'	Stadium: Sóstói Stadion; Attendance: 1,200; Referee: Zoltán Iványi; Assistant referees: István Albert, János Medovarszki; Fourth official: Zsolt Kovács

11 November 2006 13	Győr	2–0	Fehérvár	Tatabánya (Note: The match was played at the Városi Stadion in Tatabánya, instead of Győr regular stadium, the Stadion ETO in Győr, which was demolished to make way to the newly built ETO Park.)
13:30 CET (UTC+1)	P. Tóth (yellow card) 39'; Tokody 58', 85'; Jäkl (yellow card) 77'	Report	Božić (yellow card) 62'; Csizmadia (yellow card) 70'	Stadium: Városi Stadion; Attendance: 1,000; Referee: Viktor Kassai; Assistant referees: Gábor Erős, Tibor Vámos; Fourth official: Csaba Pintér

17 November 2006 14	Fehérvár	3–2	Újpest	Székesfehérvár
19:00 CET (UTC+1)	Kuttor 7'; Julinho 21'; Terjék (yellow card) 26'; Božić (red card) 28'; Dajić 37'; Sitku (yellow card) 90+2'	Report	Rajczi 14'; Erős (yellow card) 40'; Böjte (yellow card) 44'; Vaskó (yellow card) 54'; Tisza 63'	Stadium: Sóstói Stadion; Attendance: 4,500; Referee: Csaba Imre Sápi; Assistant referees: Ferenc Székely, Dr. Péter Kovács; Fourth official: Norbert Ferencz

25 November 2006 15	Rákospalota	2–0	Fehérvár	Budapest
13:00 CET (UTC+1)	Sallai (yellow card) 33'; Pusztai (yellow card) 45'; Kapcsos (yellow card) 64'; Somorjai 75'; Nyerges 77'	Report	Kocsis (red card) 25'; Dajić (yellow card) 28'	Stadium: Budai II. László Stadion; Attendance: 600; Referee: Sándor Gergely; Assistant referees: Szabolcs Deutsch, Tamás Márkus; Fourth official: Róbert Nagy

1 December 2006 16	Zalaegerszeg	2–1	Fehérvár	Zalaegerszeg
19:00 CET (UTC+1)	J. Sebők (yellow card) 9'; Ferenczi (yellow card) 12', (goal) 68'; La. Nagy 29'; Botiș (yellow card) 54'	Report	Sitku 10' (pen.); Fekete (yellow card) 22'; Kuttor (yellow card) 90+2'	Stadium: ZTE Arena; Attendance: 7,500; Referee: Ferenc Bede; Assistant referees: Vencel Tóth II, György Ring; Fourth official: Péter Herbály

10 December 2006 17	Fehérvár	3–1	Sopron	Székesfehérvár
15:00 CET (UTC+1)	Sitku 10'; Božić 18'; Terjék 55', (yellow card) 55'; D. Nagy (yellow card) 90'; Kocsis (yellow card) 90+2'	Report	T. Szabó (yellow card) 45'; Feczesin 78'	Stadium: Sóstói Stadion; Attendance: 1,500; Referee: Tamás Bognár; Assistant referees: Zoltán Kis, Zsolt Szalai; Fourth official: Zsolt Kovács

24 February 2007 18	Pécs	2–0	Fehérvár	Pécs
15:00 CET (UTC+1)	Lukács 8'; Pavičević (yellow card) 34'; Z. Varga II (yellow card) 56'; Kulcsár 62'	Report	Dvéri (yellow card) 42'; Terjék (yellow card) 61'; B. Farkas II (yellow card) 89'	Stadium: Stadion PMFC; Attendance: 1,500; Referee: Tamás Bognár; Assistant referees: Balázs Huszár, Dr. Péter Szabó; Fourth official: Krisztián Király

3 March 2007 19	Fehérvár	1–1	Paks	Székesfehérvár
16:00 CET (UTC+1)	Dajić (yellow card) 67'; Kuttor 81', (yellow card) 86'; B. Farkas II (red card) 89'; Mohl (red card) 90+2'	Report	T. Kiss I 11'; I. Mészáros (yellow card) 58'; Tamási (yellow card) 76'; Báló (yellow card) 85'; Salamon (yellow card) 86'; L. Varga (yellow card) 88'	Stadium: Sóstói Stadion; Attendance: 700; Referee: Viktor Kassai; Assistant referees: Gábor Erős, Tibor Vámos; Fourth official: Gergely Sulyok

9 March 2007 20	Vasas	2–2	Fehérvár	Budapest
19:00 CET (UTC+1)	N. Németh (yellow card) 16', (goal) 57'; Kenesei 19'; Zo. Fehér (yellow card) 26'; A. Tóth (yellow card) 30'	Report	F. Horváth (yellow card) 22', (goal) 56'; Julinho 59', (yellow card) 59'; Dvéri (yellow card) 65'	Stadium: Illovszky Rudolf Stadion; Attendance: 1,000; Referee: Sándor Gergely; Assistant referees: Szabolcs Deutsch, Zsolt Szalai; Fourth official: Tibor Gyarmati II

17 March 2007 21	Fehérvár	1–2	Kaposvár	Székesfehérvár
16:00 CET (UTC+1)	F. Horváth 55'; Kuttor (red card) 59'	Report	Ribi (yellow card) 23'; Zahorecz 60'; Grúz (yellow card) 62'; Oláh 66'; Petrók (yellow card) 88'	Stadium: Sóstói Stadion; Attendance: 1,800; Referee: Sándor Andó-Szabó; Assistant referees: Zsolt Szpisják, János Medovarszki; Fourth official: József Erdős

31 March 2007 22	Dunakanyar-Vác	0–2	Fehérvár	Vác
16:00 CEST (UTC+2)	P. Kovács (yellow card) 28'; Lettrich (yellow card) 40'; Palásthy (yellow card) 67'; Gulyás (yellow card) 71'	Report	Mohl 15'; F. Horváth 37'; Koller (yellow card) 52' (yellow-red card) 68'	Stadium: Ligeti Stadion; Attendance: 1,500; Referee: Szabolcs Szilasi; Assistant referees: Attila Kelemen, Vencel Tóth II; Fourth official: József Erdős

6 April 2007 23	Fehérvár	0–4	Debrecen	Székesfehérvár
19:00 CEST (UTC+2)		Report	Leandro 28', (yellow card) 40'; Lattenstein 35' (o.g.); Dzsudzsák 56', 70'; Bernáth (yellow card) 64'	Stadium: Sóstói Stadion; Attendance: 1,652; Referee: Ferenc Bede; Assistant referees: Gábor Erős, Zoltán Kovács; Fourth official: András Sóthy

14 April 2007 24	Tatabánya	3–2	Fehérvár	Tatabánya
17:00 CEST (UTC+2)	Vámosi 53', (red card) 71'; Filó (yellow card) 59'; Kouemaha 65'; Kichi 89'	Report	Dajić 18', 42', (yellow card) 77'; G. Horváth II (yellow card) 55'	Stadium: Városi Stadion; Attendance: 1,200; Referee: István Vad; Assistant referees: Gyula Ortó, Tamás Márkus; Fourth official: Attila Tóth

21 April 2007 25	Honvéd	1–1	Fehérvár	Budapest
18:00 CEST (UTC+2)	Guié 13'; Pomper (yellow card) 43'	Report	Baranyai 31', (yellow card) 61'; Fekete (yellow card) 38'; Božić (yellow card) 45'; Julinho (yellow card) 69'	Stadium: Bozsik József Stadion; Attendance: 3,500; Referee: Csaba Imre Sápi; Assistant referees: Zoltán Tompos, Péter Berettyán; Fourth official: István Kelemen

29 April 2007 26	Fehérvár	5–3	MTK	Székesfehérvár
16:00 CEST (UTC+2)	Dajić 19', 48'; Julinho 33' (pen.), 58' (pen.), (yellow card) 64'; Mohl (yellow card) 53'; D. Nagy 77'	Report	L. Horváth (yellow card) 14'; Kanta 25'; B. Balogh (yellow card) 33'; K. Németh 38'; Lambulić 54', (yellow card) 58'; Kriston (yellow card) 64'	Stadium: Sóstói Stadion; Attendance: 1,580; Referee: Szabolcs Szilasi; Assistant referees: Dr. Péter Kovács, Tamás Raff; Fourth official: Gábor Oláh

5 May 2007 27	Diósgyőr	2–1	Fehérvár	Miskolc
18:00 CEST (UTC+2)	Sadjo 6'; Katona (yellow card) 62'; Abdou 66'	Report	G. Horváth II (yellow card) 25' (yellow-red card) 89'; Dajić 41'; Koller (yellow card) 45'; D. Nagy (yellow card) 90'	Stadium: Diósgyőri Stadion; Attendance: 2,500; Referee: Gergely Sulyok; Assistant referees: Jozsef Heibl, Attila Forgács; Fourth official: Ádám Farkas

11 May 2007 28	Fehérvár	2–1	Győr	Székesfehérvár
19:00 CEST (UTC+2)	Božić 11'; Dajić (yellow card) 58'; Vayer 67'; Julinho (yellow card) 77'	Report	Rozsi (yellow card) 2'; Böőr (yellow card) 9'; Stark (red card) 66'; Mátyus (yellow card) 77'; Pákolicz 90'	Stadium: Sóstói Stadion; Attendance: 1,500; Referee: Zsolt Szabó; Assistant referees: Róbert Kispál, István Tóth; Fourth official: Gergő Király

21 May 2007 29	Újpest	0–2	Fehérvár	Budapest
18:00 CEST (UTC+2)	Zaleh (yellow card) 67'	Report	Dajić 45'; Julinho 50'; Zs. Fehér (yellow card) 70'; G. Horváth II (yellow card) 75'	Stadium: Szusza Ferenc Stadion; Attendance: 2,323; Referee: Viktor Kassai; Assistant referees: Gábor Erős, Zsolt Szpisják; Fourth official: József Erdős

26 May 2007 30	Fehérvár	2–2	Rákospalota	Székesfehérvár
18:00 CEST (UTC+2)	Božić (yellow card) 20'; D. Nagy 58'; B. Farkas II (yellow card) 61'; Dajić (yellow card) 81', (goal) 81'	Report	G. Horváth I (yellow card) 32'; N. Tóth 47', (yellow card) 47'; Torma 57'; Cseri (yellow card) 70'	Stadium: Sóstói Stadion; Attendance: 1,660; Referee: Csaba Imre Sápi; Assistant referees: Gyula Fehér, Péter Berettyán; Fourth official: Ádám Farkas

=== Magyar Kupa ===
18 October 2006 Round of 32	Gyirmót	5–4 (a.e.t.)	Fehérvár	Győr
17:30 CEST (UTC+2)	Lá. Nagy; N. Tóth II; Oross; Z. Török; Károlyi (yellow card) 73'	Report	Julinho; Kuttor 2x; Sitku; Vincze (red card) 58'; Božić (yellow card) 74'	Stadium: Ménfői úti Stadion; Attendance: 800; Referee: József Erdős; Assistant referees: Szécsényi, Szalai

=== Szuperkupa ===
Fehérvár, as Magyar Kupa winners in the previous season, played against Debrecen in the 2006 Szuperkupa, who themselves won the Nemzeti Bajnokság I.

17 July 2006 First leg	Fehérvár	0–1	Debrecen	Székesfehérvár
20:00 CEST (UTC+2)	Vincze (red card) 26'; G. Horváth II (yellow card) 35'	Report	Bogdanović 4'; Éger (yellow card) 75'; Máté (yellow card) 90'	Stadium: Sóstói Stadion; Attendance: 2,000; Referee: Ferenc Bede; Assistant referees: T. Vámos, P. Solymosi

20 July 2006 Second leg	Debrecen	2–1 (3–1 agg.)	Fehérvár	Debrecen
20:00 CEST (UTC+2)	Szatmári (yellow card) 13'; Halmosi (yellow card) 20'; Bernáth (yellow card) 34' (yellow-red card) 74'; Dombi (yellow card) 41'; Dzsudzsák 51'; Éger (yellow card) 69'; Koller 85' (o.g.)	Report	G. Horváth II 6', (yellow card) 70'; Božić (yellow card) 11'; Kuttor (yellow card) 55'; Koller (yellow card) 76'; F. Horváth (yellow card) 90'	Stadium: Oláh Gábor utcai Stadion; Attendance: 7,500; Referee: Mihály Fábián; Assistant referees: Dr. P. Hegyi, I. Tóth
Note: Debrecen won 3–1 on aggregate.

=== UEFA Cup ===
==== Qualifying rounds ====
===== First qualifying round =====
13 July 2006 First leg	Fehérvár (Hungary)	1–0	(Kazakhstan) Kairat	Székesfehérvár, Hungary
20:00 CEST (UTC+2)	Dvéri 8'; Koller (yellow card) 90'	Report	Artemov (yellow card) 88'	Stadium: Sóstói Stadion; Attendance: 2,721; Referee: Emil Laursen (Denmark); Assistant referees: Bill René Hansen (Denmark), Bo Abildgaard (Denmark); Fourth official: Torben Jensen (Denmark)

27 July 2006 Second leg	Kairat (Kazakhstan)	2–1 (2–2 (a) agg.)	(Hungary) Fehérvár	Almaty, Kazakhstan
19:30 TK (UTC+6)	Artemov (yellow card) 25'; Kadyrkulov (yellow card) 66'; Buleshev 75'; Smakov 86' (pen.)	Report	Sitku 34'; Božić (yellow card) 59'; B. Farkas II (yellow card) 86'; Csizmadia (yellow card) 90'	Stadium: Almaty Central Stadium; Attendance: 7,500; Referee: Augustus Constantin (Romania); Assistant referees: Marcel Savaniu (Romania), George Adrian Vidan (Romania); Fourth official: Victor Berbecaru (Romania)
Note: 2–2 on aggregate. Fehérvár won on away goals.

===== Second qualifying round =====
10 August 2006 First leg	Fehérvár (Hungary)	1–1	(Switzerland) Grasshopper	Székesfehérvár, Hungary
20:00 CEST (UTC+2)	Alumona (yellow card) 44'; Schwarcz (yellow card) 52'; G. Horváth II 90+3'	Report	Weligton (yellow card) 36'; Pinto 70', (yellow card) 78'	Stadium: Sóstói Stadion; Attendance: 3,970; Referee: Mike Dean (England); Assistant referees: David Babski (England), Darren Cann (England); Fourth official: Andre Marriner (England)

24 August 2006 Second leg	Grasshopper (Switzerland)	2–0 (3–1 agg.)	(Hungary) Fehérvár	Zürich, Switzerland
19:30 CEST (UTC+2)	Sutter 5'; António 24'; Salatić (yellow card) 58'	Report		Stadium: Hardturm; Attendance: 2,600; Referee: Björn Kuipers (Netherlands); Assistant referees: Wilco Lobbert (Netherlands), J.F. Hans Olde Olthof (Netherlands); Fourth official: Richard Liesveld (Netherlands)
Note: Grasshopper won 3–1 on aggregate.
