= 2005–06 FC Fehérvár season =

Fehérvár
2005–06 season
- Manager: Aurél Csertői
- Stadium: Sóstói Stadion
- Nemzeti Bajnokság I: 3rd
- Magyar Kupa: Winners
- Highest home attendance: 10,000 v Újpest (11 December 2005, Nemzeti Bajnokság I)
- Lowest home attendance: 1,800 v Rákospalota (31 March 2006, Nemzeti Bajnokság I)
- Average home league attendance: 4,882
- Biggest win: 5–0 v Diósgyőr (Home, 3 March 2006, Nemzeti Bajnokság I)
- Biggest defeat: 0–3 v Kaposvár (Away, 22 April 2006, Nemzeti Bajnokság I)

The 2005–06 season was Football Club Fehérvár's 37th competitive season, 6th consecutive season in the Nemzeti Bajnokság I and 63rd year in existence as a football club. In addition to the domestic league, Fehérvár participated in that season's editions of the Magyar Kupa.

== Squad ==
Squad at end of season

Note: Flags indicate national team as defined under FIFA eligibility rules; some limited exceptions apply. Players may hold more than one non-FIFA nationality.

No.	Pos.	Nation	Player
3	DF	HUN	Zsolt Fehér
5	MF	HUN	Tamás Györök
6	MF	HUN	Zoltán Schwarcz
8	MF	HUN	Norbert Lattenstein
9	FW	HUN	Illés Sitku
10	MF	HUN	Zsolt Dvéri
11	FW	RUS	Aleksandr Alumona
12	GK	HUN	Zsolt Sebők
13	MF	HUN	Gábor Kocsis
14	MF	HUN	Balázs Farkas
17	DF	HUN	Ákos Koller

No.	Pos.	Nation	Player
18	FW	HUN	Ferenc Horváth
20	MF	BIH	Mario Božić
21	FW	BIH	Jusuf Dajić
22	MF	HUN	Dániel Nagy
23	DF	HUN	Zoltán Vincze
25	DF	HUN	Viktor Vadász
29	DF	HUN	Dávid Mohl
30	GK	ROU	Daniel Tudor
33	DF	HUN	Gábor Horváth
77	DF	HUN	Attila Kuttor
85	DF	HUN	Csaba Csizmadia

== Competitions ==
=== Overview ===
Competition	First match	Last match	Starting round	Final position	Record							
Competition	First match	Last match	Starting round	Final position	Pld	W	D	L	GF	GA	GD	Win %
Nemzeti Bajnokság I	31 July 2005	3 June 2006	Matchday 1	3rd	30	19	7	4	52	24	+28	63.33
Magyar Kupa	10 September 2005	17 May 2006	Second round	Winners	9	6	3	0	18	10	+8	66.67
Total					39	25	10	4	70	34	+36	64.10

Source: Competitions

=== Nemzeti Bajnokság I ===
==== League table ====
Pos	Team	Pld	W	D	L	GF	GA	GD	Pts	Qualification or relegation
1	Debrecen (C)	30	20	8	2	69	34	+35	68	Qualification for Champions League second qualifying round
2	Újpest	30	20	5	5	74	37	+37	65	Qualification for UEFA Cup first qualifying round (Note: Videoton FC Fehérvár won the 2005–06 Hungarian Cup and thereby qualified for the first qualifying round of the UEFA Cup.)
3	Fehérvár	30	19	7	4	52	24	+28	64	Qualification for UEFA Cup first qualifying round
4	MTK	30	18	6	6	65	33	+32	60	
5	Tatabánya	30	11	8	11	46	45	+1	41	

Source: RSSSF
(C) Champions

==== Results summary ====
Overall								Home						Away					
Pld	W	D	L	GF	GA	GD	Pts	W	D	L	GF	GA	GD	W	D	L	GF	GA	GD
30	19	7	4	52	24	+28	64	10	4	1	31	11	+20	9	3	3	21	13	+8

Source: Competitions

==== Matches ====
31 July 2005 1	Ferencváros	0–1	Fehérvár	Budapest
20:00 CEST (UTC+2)	Takács (yellow card) 38'; Budovinszky (yellow card) 75'	Report	Györök 37'; Božić (yellow card) 82'; Alumona (yellow card) 85'	Stadium: Üllői úti Stadion; Attendance: 3,000; Referee: Mihály Fábián; Assistant referees: Ortó, Márkus

6 August 2005 2	Diósgyőr	1–0	Fehérvár	Miskolc
19:00 CEST (UTC+2)	V. Farkas (yellow card) 31'; F. Horváth 44' (pen.), (yellow card) 44'; Halgas (yellow card) 51'	Report	Simon (yellow card) 21'; Tudor (yellow card) 53'; G. Horváth II (yellow card) 60'; Bartyik (yellow card) 62'	Stadium: Diósgyőri Stadion; Attendance: 6,000; Referee: István Vad; Assistant referees: L. Tóth L., I. Tóth

21 August 2005 3	Fehérvár	3–0	Honvéd	Székesfehérvár
19:00 CEST (UTC+2)	Božić 23', (red card) 75'; Kuttor (yellow card) 29'; Koller (yellow card) 37'; Schwarcz (yellow card) 41'; Disztl 70'; G. Horváth II (red card) 75'; B. Farkas II 80'	Report	N. Kovács (red card) 75'; A. Mészáros (yellow card) 86'	Stadium: Sóstói Stadion; Attendance: 8,000; Referee: Szabolcs Saskőy; Assistant referees: Székely, Heibl

27 August 2005 4	Vasas	0–3	Fehérvár	Budapest
19:00 CEST (UTC+2)	Bárányos (yellow card)	Report	Disztl (yellow card); Csizmadia 6'; Koller 78'; Alumona 87'	Stadium: Illovszky Rudolf Stadion; Attendance: 4,000; Referee: János Megyebíró; Assistant referees: Szpisják, I. Medovarszki; Fourth official: S. Szabó

17 September 2005 5	Fehérvár	2–1	Pápa	Székesfehérvár
19:00 CEST (UTC+2)	B. Farkas II 22'; Z. Vincze 43'; Schwarcz (yellow card) 82'; D. Nagy (yellow card) 87'	Report	Remili (yellow card) 24'; Kuttor 90' (o.g.)	Stadium: Sóstói Stadion; Attendance: 4,000; Referee: Viktor Kassai; Assistant referees: G. Erős, A. Kelemen

24 September 2005 6	Rákospalota	1–2	Fehérvár	Budapest
16:00 CEST (UTC+2)	Virágh (yellow card) 21'; Somorjai 75'; Sallai (yellow card) 82'	Report	Kuttor (yellow card) 25'; Sitku 37', 59'; Tudor (yellow card) 81'	Stadium: Budai II. László Stadion; Attendance: 1,500; Referee: Mihály Fábián; Assistant referees: Ortó, Márkus

1 October 2005 7	Fehérvár	1–0	Zalaegerszeg	Székesfehérvár
18:00 CEST (UTC+2)	Kuttor 3'	Report	Bojović (yellow card) 36'; V. Sebők (yellow card) 43'; C. Balog (yellow card) 52'	Stadium: Sóstói Stadion; Attendance: 6,000; Referee: Ferenc Bede; Assistant referees: Tompos, L. Tóth L.

15 October 2005 8	Pécs	0–2	Fehérvár	Pécs
18:00 CEST (UTC+2)	Szabados (yellow card) 30'; Schindler (yellow card) 81'	Report	B. Farkas II (yellow card) 35'; Koller 43'; Sitku 89'	Stadium: Stadion PMFC; Attendance: 2,000; Referee: Zsolt Szabó; Assistant referees: Hegyi, Kispál

22 October 2005 9	Fehérvár	3–0	Kaposvár	Székesfehérvár
18:00 CEST (UTC+2)	B. Farkas II 42'; Božić 59', 90'	Report		Stadium: Sóstói Stadion; Attendance: 4,000; Referee: Mihály Fábián; Assistant referees: Ortó, Márkus

30 October 2005 10	Debrecen	2–0	Fehérvár	Debrecen
11:30 CET (UTC+1)	Brnović 41'; Szatmári (yellow card) 42'; Halmosi 45'; Ferenczi (yellow card) 78'; Éger (penalty missed) 90+2'	Report	B. Farkas II (yellow card) 33' (yellow-red card) 57'; Sitku (yellow card) 90+1'	Stadium: Oláh Gábor utcai Stadion; Attendance: 8,000; Referee: János Megyebíró; Assistant referees: Szpisják, P. Tóth

5 November 2005 11	Fehérvár	1–0	MTK	Székesfehérvár
18:00 CET (UTC+1)	Csizmadia (yellow card) 31', (goal) 74' (pen.); Schwarcz (yellow card) 89'	Report	Jezdimirović (yellow card) 47'	Stadium: Sóstói Stadion; Attendance: 6,000; Referee: Szabolcs Saskőy; Assistant referees: Székely, Heibl

20 November 2005 12	Tatabánya	0–1	Fehérvár	Tatabánya
11:30 CET (UTC+1)	Filó (yellow card) 17'; Rizvanolli (yellow card) 83'	Report	B. Farkas II (yellow card) 21'; Sitku (yellow card) 44'; K. Németh I 67' (o.g.)	Stadium: Városi Stadion; Attendance: 3,500; Referee: Attila Hanacsek; Assistant referees: P. Kovács, I. A. Nagy

26 November 2005 13	Fehérvár	2–2	Győr	Székesfehérvár
17:00 CET (UTC+1)	Sitku 29', 69'; Bartyik (yellow card) 85'	Report	Priskin (yellow card) 20'; Kenesei 46', 89'	Stadium: Sóstói Stadion; Attendance: 5,000; Referee: János Megyebíró; Assistant referees: Szpisják, P. Tóth

3 December 2005 14	Sopron	1–1	Fehérvár	Sopron
15:00 CET (UTC+1)	Cigan 1'; Bagoly (yellow card) 33'	Report	Simek 31'; Schwarcz (yellow card) 57'	Stadium: Káposztás utcai Stadion; Attendance: 3,300; Referee: Ferenc Bede; Assistant referees: T. Vámos, Z. Szalai

11 December 2005 15	Fehérvár	1–1	Újpest	Székesfehérvár
11:30 CET (UTC+1)	B. Farkas II (yellow card) 40' (yellow-red card) 75'; Simek 50'	Report	G. Sándor (yellow card) 3'; Feczesin 24'; Böjte (yellow card) 80'	Stadium: Sóstói Stadion; Attendance: 10,000; Referee: István Vad; Assistant referees: Z. Tompos, T. Vámos

26 February 2006 16	Fehérvár	1–1	Ferencváros	Székesfehérvár
11:30 CET (UTC+1)	Tudor (yellow card) 13'; Csizmadia (yellow card) 20' (yellow-red card) 59'; Božić (yellow card) 80'; Lattenstein 86'	Report	G. Erős (yellow card) 54'; Tímár 81'	Stadium: Sóstói Stadion; Attendance: 5,000; Referee: János Megyebíró; Assistant referees: Szpisják, P. Tóth

3 March 2006 17	Fehérvár	5–0	Diósgyőr	Székesfehérvár
19:00 CET (UTC+1)	Dvéri 45'; Sitku 60', 78' (pen.); Györök 74'; G. Horváth II (yellow card) 80'; Lattenstein 89'	Report	Vitelki (yellow card) 8'; V. Farkas (yellow card) 32'; Simon (yellow card) 87'	Stadium: Sóstói Stadion; Attendance: 2,500; Referee: Szabolcs Saskőy; Assistant referees: Székely, Heibl

18 March 2006 19	Fehérvár	1–0	Vasas	Székesfehérvár
16:00 CET (UTC+1)	Koller (yellow card) 63'; Božić 65'	Report	Z. Pintér (yellow card) 12'; Zs. Fehér (yellow card) 17'; Z. Molnár (yellow card) 45'; A. Tóth (yellow card) 71' (yellow-red card) 73'	Stadium: Sóstói Stadion; Attendance: 4,000; Referee: Csaba Imre Sápi; Assistant referees: P. Szabó, I. A. Nagy

25 March 2006 20	Pápa	0–2	Fehérvár	Pápa
17:00 CET (UTC+1)	D'Arrigo (yellow card) 23'; Lipták (yellow card) 33'; Mumba (yellow card) 65'	Report	Sitku 29' (pen.), 61'; Z. Vincze (yellow card) 80'; Tudor (yellow card) 81'; Koller (yellow card) 84'; D. Nagy (yellow card) 90+1'	Stadium: Perutz Stadion; Attendance: 2,000; Referee: Viktor Kassai; Assistant referees: G. Erős, Z. Szalai

31 March 2006 21	Fehérvár	3–1	Rákospalota	Székesfehérvár
19:00 CEST (UTC+2)	Sitku 6', 50'; Csizmadia 89'	Report	Polonkai 65'; Koltai (yellow card) 67'	Stadium: Sóstói Stadion; Attendance: 1,800; Referee: József Erdős; Assistant referees: A. Kelemen, I. A. Nagy

8 April 2006 22	Zalaegerszeg	1–1	Fehérvár	Zalaegerszeg
17:00 CEST (UTC+2)	Kónya 13', (yellow card) 85'; B. Molnár (yellow card) 42'; Józsi (yellow card) 44'; Kocsárdi (yellow card) 66'; A. Horváth II (yellow card) 86'	Report	Alumona 5'; Csizmadia (yellow card) 50'; Dajić (yellow card) 60'	Stadium: ZTE Arena; Attendance: 5,000; Referee: Péter Solymosi; Assistant referees: Takács, P. Kovács

15 April 2006 23	Fehérvár	1–0	Pécs	Székesfehérvár
18:00 CEST (UTC+2)	Dvéri 43'; Schwarcz (yellow card) 45' (yellow-red card) 62'	Report	Bajúsz (yellow card) 26'; Berdó (yellow card) 30'; Kulcsár (yellow card) 58'	Stadium: Sóstói Stadion; Attendance: 3,500; Referee: István Vad; Assistant referees: G. Erős, G. Takács

19 April 2006 18	Honvéd	1–1	Fehérvár	Budapest
18:00 CEST (UTC+2)	Schrancz (yellow card) 19' (yellow-red card) 49', (goal) 49'; Z. Takács (yellow card) 31'	Report	D. Nagy 7'; Csizmadia (yellow card) 58'	Stadium: Bozsik József Stadion; Attendance: 2,000; Referee: Mihály Fábián; Assistant referees: Ortó, Márkus

22 April 2006 24	Kaposvár	3–0	Fehérvár	Kaposvár
18:00 CEST (UTC+2)	Andruskó (yellow card) 7'; Zahorecz (yellow card) 23', (goal) 39' (pen.); Alves 26'; P. Máté I (yellow card) 52'; Oláh 87'	Report	Györök (yellow card) 28'; Zs. Fehér (yellow card) 37'; B. Farkas II (yellow card) 53'	Stadium: Rákóczi Stadion; Attendance: 2,500; Referee: Andó-Szabó Sándor; Assistant referees: Kispál, Tompos

30 April 2006 25	Fehérvár	1–2	Debrecen	Székesfehérvár
11:30 CEST (UTC+2)	Gá. Horváth II (yellow card) 37'; Dvéri (yellow card) 63'; Sitku (yellow card) 69'; D. Nagy (yellow card) 77'; Csizmadia 81'	Report	Szatmári (yellow card) 15'; Bernáth (yellow card) 22'; Halmosi (yellow card) 51'; T. Sándor 61'; P. Máté II 90'	Stadium: Sóstói Stadion; Attendance: 4,500; Referee: János Megyebíró; Assistant referees: Szpisják, I. Albert

6 May 2006 26	MTK	0–1	Fehérvár	Budapest
19:00 CEST (UTC+2)	Lambulić (yellow card) 42'; Zsidai (yellow card) 77'; L. Horváth (yellow card) 81'	Report	Lattenstein (yellow card) 53'; Csizmadia (yellow card) 75'; F. Horváth 86'	Stadium: Hidegkuti Nándor Stadion; Attendance: 1,000; Referee: Péter Solymosi; Assistant referees: I. A. Nagy, G. Ortó

13 May 2006 27	Fehérvár	4–1	Tatabánya	Székesfehérvár
15:00 CEST (UTC+2)	G. Horváth II (yellow card) 15'; Koller (yellow card) 21'; Sitku 24'; Kuttor 33'; Alumona (red card) 39'; Csizmadia 54' (pen.); Schwarcz 76'; B. Farkas II (yellow card) 82'	Report	Vámosi 14' (pen.); Z. Balogh (yellow card) 30' (yellow-red card) 39'; Mile (yellow card) 49'	Stadium: Sóstói Stadion; Attendance: 2,925; Referee: Mihály Fábián; Assistant referees: J. Heibl, T. Vámos

20 May 2006 28	Győr	2–3	Fehérvár	Győr
18:00 CEST (UTC+2)	Granát 18'; Hanák 36'; Mátyus (yellow card) 67'	Report	Božić 2', 39'; Schwarcz (yellow card) 51'; F. Horváth 83'	Stadium: Stadion ETO; Attendance: 900; Referee: Sándor Gergely; Assistant referees: Z. Kovács, L. Varga II

27 May 2006 29	Fehérvár	2–2	Sopron	Székesfehérvár
18:00 CEST (UTC+2)	Sitku 11' (pen.), 62', (yellow card) 55'; Schwarcz (yellow card) 34'; B. Farkas II (yellow card) 90+1'	Report	Costișor (yellow card) 22'; Bagoly 38'; A. Horváth I 70' (pen.)	Stadium: Sóstói Stadion; Attendance: 6,000; Referee: Károly Török; Assistant referees: Márkus, Ortó

3 June 2006 30	Újpest	1–3	Fehérvár	Budapest (Note: The match was played at the Ferenc Puskás Stadium in Budapest, instead of Újpest regular stadium, the Szusza Ferenc Stadion in Budapest, after incidents at the Újpest v MTK match on 20 May 2006.)
16:20 CEST (UTC+2)	B. Tóth (yellow card) 30'; Rajczi (red card) 42'; Tisza 63'; N. Tóth (red card) 78'	Report	Dajić (yellow card) 23'; Csizmadia 69'; Z. Vincze (yellow card) 74'; D. Nagy 78', (yellow card) 78'; F. Horváth 90+2'	Stadium: Ferenc Puskás Stadium; Attendance: 15,000; Referee: Attila Hanacsek; Assistant referees: L. Tóth. L., Tompos

=== Magyar Kupa ===
10 September 2005 Second round	Kozármisleny	2–3	Fehérvár	Kozármisleny
16:00 CEST (UTC+2)	M. Farkas (yellow card) , P. Kovács (yellow card); I. Tóth (yellow card); Hergenrőder	Report	Božić (yellow card) , Disztl (yellow card); Koller (yellow card); Z. Vincze (yellow card); B. Farkas II; Sitku; Lattenstein (red card) 90+2'	Stadium: Alkotmány tér Attendance: 800; Referee: Sóthy; Assistant referees: Beidek, Z. Kis

20 September 2005 Third round	Baktalórántháza	0–2	Fehérvár	Baktalórántháza
15:30 CEST (UTC+2)	Rakóczi (yellow card); Szenes (yellow card)	Report	Božić (yellow card); Schwarcz 35'; Alumona 69'	Stadium: Városi Stadion; Attendance: 800; Referee: S. Szabó; Assistant referees: I. Albert, Vári

==== Round of 16 ====
26 October 2005 First leg	Fehérvár	1–1	MTK	Székesfehérvár
18:00 CEST (UTC+2)	Sitku 3'	Report	Jezdimirović (yellow card) 52'; Pollák (yellow card) 54'; Hrepka 64', (yellow card) 72'	Stadium: Sóstói Stadion; Attendance: 4,000; Referee: Zoltán Szarka; Assistant referees: P. Szabó, Z. Kovács

6 December 2005 Second leg	MTK	1–2 (2–3 agg.)	Fehérvár	Budapest
17:00 CET (UTC+1)	B. Balogh (yellow card) 83', (goal) 90+2' (pen.); Zabos (yellow card) 85'	Report	Kuttor 12'; Sitku 29'; Bartyik (yellow card) 88'	Stadium: Hidegkuti Nándor Stadion; Attendance: 500; Referee: Mihály Fábián; Assistant referees: Ortó, T. Márkus
Note: Fehérvár won 3–2 on aggregate.

==== Quarter-finals ====
15 March 2006 First leg	Kaposvár	1–2	Fehérvár	Kaposvár
18:00 CET (UTC+1)	Alves 18'; Zahorecz (yellow card) 33'; P. Máté I (yellow card) 68'; A. Pintér (yellow card) 88'	Report	Schwarcz 44'; Csizmadia (yellow card) 58', (goal) 81'; Kuttor (yellow card) 69'	Stadium: Rákóczi Stadion; Attendance: 1,800; Referee: József Erdős; Assistant referees: Erős, Szalai

22 March 2006 Second leg	Fehérvár	3–1 (5–2 agg.)	Kaposvár	Székesfehérvár
18:00 CET (UTC+1)	Sitku 4'; Dajić 42', 62'	Report	Tereánszki-Tóth (yellow card) 26'; Zahorecz (yellow card) 66'; Oláh 87'	Stadium: Sóstói Stadion; Attendance: 2,000; Referee: Ferenc Bede; Assistant referees: P. Kovács, T. Vámos
Note: Fehérvár won 5–2 on aggregate.

==== Semi-finals ====
25 April 2006 First leg	Debrecen	0–1	Fehérvár	Debrecen
18:00 CEST (UTC+2)	Szatmári (yellow card) 38'; T. Sándor (yellow card) 44'; B. Virág (yellow card) 62'	Report	Schwarcz (yellow card) 32'; Kuttor (yellow card) 33'; B. Farkas II (yellow card) 37' (yellow-red card) 90+3'; Dvéri 44'; Lattenstein (yellow card) 71'; Gá. Horváth II (yellow card) 75'; Božić (yellow card) 83'	Stadium: Oláh Gábor utcai Stadion; Attendance: 6,000; Referee: Zsolt Szabó; Assistant referees: Kispál, Hegyi

3 May 2006 Second leg	Fehérvár	2–2 (3–2 agg.)	Debrecen	Székesfehérvár
18:00 CEST (UTC+2)	Sitku 40'; Csizmadia 78' (pen.); Tudor (red card) 86'; Györök (red card) 88'; Dvéri (yellow card) 90+4'	Report	Bogdanović 23' (pen.); Halmosi (yellow card) 26'; B. Virág (yellow card) 60'; Sidibe (yellow card) 77'; Dzsudzsák 82'; Vukmir (yellow card) 85'	Stadium: Sóstói Stadion; Attendance: 4,000; Referee: Ferenc Bede; Assistant referees: Tompos, T. Vámos
Note: Fehérvár won 3–2 on aggregate.

==== Final ====
17 May 2006 Final	Vasas	2–2 (a.e.t.) (5–6 p)	Fehérvár	Budapest
18:00 CEST (UTC+2)	Waltner 25', (yellow card) 119'; Kapič (yellow card) 51'; Zs. Balog 84'; Zováth (yellow card) 85'; Z. Molnár (yellow card) 110'	Report	Sitku 46', (yellow card) 62'; Schwarcz 57'	Stadium: Üllői úti Stadion; Attendance: 5,000; Referee: János Megyebíró; Assistant referees: F. Székely, Tompos
	Penalties
	Bárányos (penalty scored); Csordás (penalty scored); Gyánó (penalty scored); Janjić (penalty missed); A. Tóth (penalty scored); Zováth (penalty scored); Z. Molnár (penalty missed)		(penalty scored) Sitku; (penalty scored) F. Horváth; (penalty scored) Koller; (penalty missed) Dajić; (penalty scored) Csizmadia; (penalty scored) Kuttor; (penalty scored) Božić
Note: Fehérvár won 6–5 on penalties.
