= 2007–08 FC Fehérvár season =

Fehérvár
2007–08 season
- Manager: Marijan Vlak (until 27 December 2007); László Disztl (from 7 January 2008)
- Stadium: Sóstói Stadion
- Nemzeti Bajnokság I: 5th
- Magyar Kupa: Quarter-finals
- Ligakupa: Autumn season: Winners; Spring season: Group stage Final: Winners
- Highest home attendance: 3,790 v Győr (19 April 2008, Nemzeti Bajnokság I)
- Lowest home attendance: 100 v Paks (20 February 2008, Ligakupa)
- Average home league attendance: 1,980
- Biggest win: 12–0 v Velence (Away, 26 September 2007, Magyar Kupa)
- Biggest defeat: 1–5 v Honvéd (Away, 5 August 2007, Nemzeti Bajnokság I)

The 2007–08 season was Football Club Fehérvár's 39th competitive season, 8th consecutive season in the Nemzeti Bajnokság I and 65th year in existence as a football club. In addition to the domestic league, Fehérvár participated in that season's editions of the Magyar Kupa and the Ligakupa.

== Squad ==
Squad at end of season

Note: Flags indicate national team as defined under FIFA eligibility rules; some limited exceptions apply. Players may hold more than one non-FIFA nationality.

No.	Pos.	Nation	Player
1	GK	HUN	Zsolt Sebők
2	DF	UKR	Mykhaylo Denysov
3	DF	HUN	Gábor Horváth
4	DF	HUN	Dávid Mohl
5	DF	HUN	Ákos Koller
6	MF	HUN	Tamás Sifter
7	MF	HUN	Péter Simek
8	MF	HUN	Attila Polonkai
9	FW	HUN	Illés Sitku
10	MF	HUN	Zsolt Dvéri
11	FW	BIH	Jusuf Dajić
12	GK	HUN	Viktor Németh
13	MF	HUN	Gábor Kocsis
14	MF	HUN	Balázs Farkas
15	MF	HUN	Dániel Nagy
16	MF	HUN	Norbert Lattenstein

No.	Pos.	Nation	Player
17	MF	HUN	István Sándor
18	FW	HUN	Ádám Csobánki
19	FW	HUN	Péter Lelkes
20	DF	HUN	Pál Lázár
21	MF	HUN	Géza Gulyás
23	DF	HUN	Zsolt Fehér
24	DF	HUN	András Fejes
25	DF	HUN	Viktor Vadász
26	FW	UKR	Roman Drabenyuk
30	FW	HUN	Viktor Bölcsföldi
31	GK	HUN	Péter Halasi
—	DF	HUN	Attila Fekete
—	DF	HUN	József Kakas
—	DF	HUN	Attila Mészáros
—	MF	HUN	Ádám Horváth
—	MF	HUN	Milán Pálfi

== Competitions ==
=== Overview ===
Competition	First match	Last match	Starting round	Final position	Record							
Competition	First match	Last match	Starting round	Final position	Pld	W	D	L	GF	GA	GD	Win %
Nemzeti Bajnokság I	23 July 2007	2 June 2008	Matchday 1	5th	30	17	3	10	48	32	+16	56.67
Magyar Kupa	29 August 2007	27 March 2008	Third round	Quarter-finals	6	4	1	1	24	7	+17	66.67
Ligakupa (Autumn season)	15 August 2007	28 November 2007	Group stage	Advanced as Winners	12	5	3	4	26	17	+9	41.67
Ligakupa (Spring season)	30 November 2007	27 February 2008	Group stage	Group stage	6	1	0	5	7	15	−8	16.67
Ligakupa (Grand final)	14 May 2008	20 May 2008	Final	Winners	2	2	0	0	3	0	+3	100.00
Total					56	29	7	20	108	71	+37	51.79

Source: Competitions

=== Nemzeti Bajnokság I ===
==== League table ====
Pos	Team	Pld	W	D	L	GF	GA	GD	Pts	Qualification or relegation
3	Győr	30	16	10	4	64	35	+29	58	Qualification for UEFA Cup first qualifying round
4	Újpest	30	16	7	7	58	40	+18	55	
5	Fehérvár	30	17	3	10	48	32	+16	54	
6	Kaposvár	30	14	9	7	48	38	+10	51	
7	Zalaegerszeg	30	13	7	10	55	39	+16	46	

Source: soccerway.com

==== Results summary ====
Overall								Home						Away					
Pld	W	D	L	GF	GA	GD	Pts	W	D	L	GF	GA	GD	W	D	L	GF	GA	GD
30	17	3	10	48	32	+16	54	11	3	1	31	8	+23	6	0	9	17	24	−7

Source: Hungarian Football Federation

==== Matches ====
23 July 2007 1	MTK	2–0	Fehérvár	Budapest
18:00 CEST (UTC+2)	J. Kanta (yellow card) 38'; Bori 52'; Pátkai (yellow card) 57'; Urbán 60'	Report	Koller (yellow card) 60'; Kocsis (yellow card) 72'; Baranyai (yellow card) 78'; Mohl (yellow card) 84'	Stadium: Hidegkuti Nándor Stadion; Attendance: 1,500; Referee: Ferenc Bede; Assistant referees: Imre Attila Nagy, Balázs Farkas; Fourth official: Ádám Németh

30 July 2007 2	Fehérvár	1–1	Kaposvár	Székesfehérvár
20:00 CEST (UTC+2)	Božić 44'; Baranyai (yellow card) 46'; Koller (yellow card) 69'	Report	Zahorecz (yellow card) 18', (goal) 46'; Maróti (yellow card) 29'	Stadium: Sóstói Stadion; Attendance: 1,668; Referee: Tamás Bognár; Assistant referees: Zoltán Kovács, Dr. Péter Szabó; Fourth official: Krisztián Király

5 August 2007 3	Honvéd	5–1	Fehérvár	Budapest
19:00 CEST (UTC+2)	Dobos 14'; Palásthy 26'; Diego 34'; G. Vincze (yellow card) 44'; Bárányos 82'; Hercegfalvi 85', (yellow card) 86'	Report	Božić 11', (yellow card) 52'	Stadium: Bozsik József Stadion; Attendance: 2,500; Referee: Csaba Imre Sápi; Assistant referees: Dr. Zsolt Varga, Zoltán Pápai; Fourth official: Róbert Nagy

11 August 2007 4	Fehérvár	5–2	Vasas	Székesfehérvár
19:00 CEST (UTC+2)	Sitku 7', 33'; Dajić 24'; B. Farkas (yellow card) 45', (goal) 60'; D. Nagy (yellow card) 45'; Božić 76'; G. Horváth II (yellow card) 83'	Report	Zs. Balog (yellow card) 15'; Pavičević (yellow card) 21'; Rebryk 29'; G. Kovács (red card) 32'; Kincses (yellow card) 43'; Lázok 83'; K. Kiss (yellow card) 90'	Stadium: Sóstói Stadion; Attendance: 1,500; Referee: Péter Solymosi; Assistant referees: Dr. Péter Kovács, Gábor Takács; Fourth official: Imre Schnellbach

18 August 2007 5	Nyíregyháza	0–1	Fehérvár	Nyíregyháza
15:00 CEST (UTC+2)	Cornaci (yellow card) 73'; Zaleh (yellow card) 79'	Report	B. Farkas 36'	Stadium: Városi Stadion; Attendance: 4,000; Referee: Viktor Kassai; Assistant referees: Tibor Vámos, Zsolt Márton; Fourth official: Gergő Janitz

25 August 2007 6	Fehérvár	7–0	Tatabánya	Székesfehérvár
19:00 CEST (UTC+2)	Koller (yellow card) 26'; Dajić 39', 70', (yellow card) 70'; Vayer 60'; B. Farkas 63'; Simek 64'; Božić (yellow card) 70'; G. Horváth II (yellow card) 83'; Dvéri 87'; Sitku 89'	Report	Kichi (red card) 38'; Poleksić (yellow card) 70'	Stadium: Sóstói Stadion; Attendance: 1,596; Referee: Roland Veizer; Assistant referees: Szabolcs Deutsch, Zoltán Kis; Fourth official: Tibor Gyarmati II

1 September 2007 7	Rákospalota	0–2	Fehérvár	Budapest
16:30 CEST (UTC+2)	G. Horváth I (yellow card) 37'; Sallai (yellow card) 63'; Kőhalmi (yellow card) 79'	Report	Simek 22', 34'; Sitku (yellow card) 77'	Stadium: Budai II. László Stadion; Attendance: 1,200; Referee: Péter Solymosi; Assistant referees: Zoltán Tompos, Dr. Péter Hegyi; Fourth official: János Csák

15 September 2007 8	Fehérvár	2–0	Sopron	Székesfehérvár
18:00 CEST (UTC+2)	Csobánki 23'; G. Horváth II (yellow card) 43'; Sitku 45' (pen.)	Report	Z. Pintér (yellow card) 36'; Ködöböcz (yellow card) 38'; Belić (yellow card) 61'; Zo. Fehér (yellow card) 66'	Stadium: Sóstói Stadion; Attendance: 1,500; Referee: Sándor Andó-Szabó; Assistant referees: Zsolt Márton, Zoltán Kis; Fourth official: István Kelemen

22 September 2007 9	Győr	4–1	Fehérvár	Győr
16:00 CEST (UTC+2)	Völgyi (yellow card) 22'; Brnović 31'; Nikolov (yellow card) 52'; Bajzát 57'; Bogdanović 73'; Bank 86'	Report	Kocsis (yellow card) 18'; Sitku 23', (yellow card) 58'; Koller (red card) 87'	Stadium: ETO Park; Attendance: 6,000; Referee: Gergely Sulyok; Assistant referees: György Ring, Vencel Tóth II; Fourth official: Tibor Farkas

29 September 2007 10	Paks	2–1	Fehérvár	Paks
16:00 CEST (UTC+2)	Z. Molnár (yellow card) 24'; S. Horváth (yellow card) 36'; Buzás 48' (pen.), (yellow card) 61'; Tököli 90+3'	Report	D. Nagy (yellow card) 26'; Dvéri (yellow card) 43'; Éger 45' (o.g.)	Stadium: Fehérvári úti Stadion; Attendance: 2,000; Referee: Tamás Bognár; Assistant referees: Balázs Farkas, Zoltán Tompos; Fourth official: János Csák

5 October 2007 11	Fehérvár	1–2	Újpest	Székesfehérvár
19:00 CEST (UTC+2)	Csobánki (yellow card) 32'; Dajić 37', (yellow card) 90+2'	Report	Kéthévoama (yellow card) 4'; Sadjo (yellow card) 46'; Z. Kovács I 74'; Tisza 85'	Stadium: Sóstói Stadion; Attendance: 1,921; Referee: Péter Solymosi; Assistant referees: Zsolt Szpisják, Gábor Takács; Fourth official: Attila Hegedűs

19 October 2007 12	Diósgyőr	2–0	Fehérvár	Miskolc
19:00 CEST (UTC+2)	A. Simon (yellow card) 27', (goal) 86'; Sipeki 47'	Report	Božić (yellow card) 20'; Mohl (yellow card) 31'; G. Horváth II (yellow card) 80'	Stadium: Diósgyőri Stadion; Attendance: 2,000; Referee: Csaba Imre Sápi; Assistant referees: Péter Berettyán, Gyula Fehér; Fourth official: János Guta

5 November 2007 13	Fehérvár	0–0	Debrecen	Székesfehérvár
18:00 CET (UTC+1)	Sitku (yellow card) 61'; Dvéri (yellow card) 74'; Csobánki (red card) 83'	Report	Leandro (yellow card) 44'	Stadium: Sóstói Stadion; Attendance: 862; Referee: István Vad; Assistant referees: Vencel Tóth II, Zoltán Tompos; Fourth official: József Erdős

10 November 2007 14	Siófok	1–0	Fehérvár	Siófok
16:00 CET (UTC+1)	Gajda 90'	Report	G. Horváth II (yellow card) 37'	Stadium: Révész Géza utcai Stadion; Attendance: 1,500; Referee: József Berger; Assistant referees: József Heibl, Attila Forgács; Fourth official: Imre Schnellbach

24 November 2007 15	Fehérvár	2–0	Zalaegerszeg	Székesfehérvár
13:00 CET (UTC+1)	Dvéri 31', (yellow card) 33'; Csobánki (yellow card) 72'; B. Farkas 80'	Report	Miljatovič (yellow card) 1'; P. Máté I (yellow card) 61'; Z. Tóth (yellow card) 71'	Stadium: Sóstói Stadion; Attendance: 1,000; Referee: Péter Solymosi; Assistant referees: Dr. Péter Kovács, Imre Attila Nagy; Fourth official: Gergő Király

25 February 2008 16	Fehérvár	1–0	MTK	Székesfehérvár
18:00 CET (UTC+1)	G. Horváth II (yellow card) 4'; Sitku 33'; Polonkai (yellow card) 53'	Report	Lambulić (yellow card) 53'; Zsidai (yellow card) 64'	Stadium: Sóstói Stadion; Attendance: 1,805; Referee: Péter Solymosi; Assistant referees: Gábor Erős, Balázs Farkas; Fourth official: Gergő Király

1 March 2008 17	Kaposvár	1–0	Fehérvár	Kaposvár
16:00 CET (UTC+1)	Nikolić 76'	Report	Sitku (yellow card) 60'; Dvéri (yellow card) 63'	Stadium: Rákóczi Stadion; Attendance: 2,000; Referee: Gegely Sulyok; Assistant referees: Vencel Tóth II, István Iványi; Fourth official: Csaba Ursprung

7 March 2008 18	Fehérvár	0–0	Honvéd	Székesfehérvár
19:00 CET (UTC+1)	Koller (yellow card) 81'	Report	Ivancsics (yellow card) 30'	Stadium: Sóstói Stadion; Attendance: 2,166; Referee: Viktor Kassai; Assistant referees: Gábor Erős, Tibor Vámos; Fourth official: Gábor Oláh

15 March 2008 19	Vasas	1–2	Fehérvár	Budapest
16:00 CET (UTC+1)	N. Németh 62'	Report	Sitku 41'; Lázár (yellow card) 45'; D. Nagy (yellow card) 56'; G. Horváth II (yellow card) 71'; Sifter (yellow card) 82'; Koller 87'	Stadium: Illovszky Rudolf Stadion; Attendance: 2,800; Referee: Roland Veizer; Assistant referees: Gyula Fehér, Péter Berettyán; Fourth official: László Varga

22 March 2008 20	Fehérvár	2–1	Nyíregyháza	Székesfehérvár
16:00 CET (UTC+1)	Dvéri 16'; Simek (yellow card) 59'; Sitku 63'	Report	Mboussi (yellow card) 33'; Cornaci (yellow card) 66', (goal) 73'; Minczér (yellow card) 86'	Stadium: Sóstói Stadion; Attendance: 1,168; Referee: József Berger; Assistant referees: Vencel Tóth II, Attila Forgács; Fourth official: Gergő Janitz

30 March 2008 21	Tatabánya	1–3	Fehérvár	Budapest (Note: The match was played at the Szőnyi úti Stadion in Budapest, instead of Tatabánya regular stadium, the Városi Stadion in Tatabánya, which did not meet HFF requirements.)
16:00 CEST (UTC+2)	Almási (yellow card) 60'; Béres 73'; Kichi (yellow card) 75'	Report	Koller 26'; Polonkai 44'; Dajić 53'; B. Farkas (yellow card) 72'	Stadium: Szőnyi úti Stadion; Attendance: 0 Referee: Péter Solymosi; Assistant referees: Tibor Vígh, János Agócs; Fourth official: Ferenc Szöllősi

5 April 2008 22	Fehérvár	2–1	Rákospalota	Székesfehérvár
19:00 CEST (UTC+2)	Polonkai 13'; Koller (yellow card) 32'; Sitku 77'; Sifter (yellow card) 90+1'	Report	Nyerges 14'; Kapcsos (yellow card) 66'; Szántai (yellow card) 71'; Erős (yellow card) 73'	Stadium: Sóstói Stadion; Attendance: 1,571; Referee: Tamás Bognár; Assistant referees: Balázs Huszár, Dr. Péter Szabó; Fourth official: Csana Pintér

12 April 2008 23	Sopron	0–3 (awd.)	Fehérvár	Sopron
		Report		Stadium: Káposztás utcai Stadion
Note: After the exclusion of Sopron, the matches were registered with a goal difference of 3–0.

19 April 2008 24	Fehérvár	1–0	Győr	Székesfehérvár
19:00 CEST (UTC+2)	Dajić 9'; Simek (yellow card) 58'; Z. Sebők (yellow card) 89'	Report	Stark (yellow card) 11'; Böőr (yellow card) 56'; Völgyi (yellow card) 65'; Józsi (yellow card) 86'; Nikolov (yellow card) 90+2'	Stadium: Sóstói Stadion; Attendance: 3,790; Referee: Viktor Kassai; Assistant referees: Tibor Vámos, Vencel Tóth II; Fourth official: Tibor Farkas

26 April 2008 25	Fehérvár	3–0	Paks	Székesfehérvár
19:00 CEST (UTC+2)	Dvéri 22'; G. Horváth II (yellow card) 44'; D. Nagy (yellow card) 66', (goal) 70'; Koller (yellow card) 82', (goal) 90'	Report	S. Horváth (yellow card) 35'; Éger (yellow card) 87'	Stadium: Sóstói Stadion; Attendance: 3,315; Referee: Roland Veizer; Assistant referees: Tamás Márkus, Zoltán Pápai; Fourth official: Ádám Farkas

2 May 2008 26	Újpest	1–0	Fehérvár	Budapest
19:00 CEST (UTC+2)	Dourandi (yellow card) 35'; Božić (yellow card) 38'; G. Sándor 83'	Report	B. Farkas (yellow card) 34'	Stadium: Szusza Ferenc Stadion; Attendance: 5,108; Referee: Péter Solymosi; Assistant referees: Gábor Takács, István Tóth; Fourth official: Gábor Oláh

10 May 2008 27	Fehérvár	3–1	Diósgyőr	Székesfehérvár
19:00 CEST (UTC+2)	Sitku 56'; Dvéri 81'; D. Nagy 90'	Report	Z. Pintér (yellow card) 41', (goal) 70'; V. Sebők (yellow card) 45'; Kamber (yellow card) 70'	Stadium: Sóstói Stadion; Attendance: 3,015; Referee: Szabolcs Szilasi; Assistant referees: Oszkár Lémon, Attila Beidek; Fourth official: Dávid Ákos

17 May 2008 28	Debrecen	3–0	Fehérvár	Debrecen
13:00 CEST (UTC+2)	Huszák 49'; Czvitkovics 57'; Mészáros (yellow card) 73'; Kerekes (yellow card) 80'; Kouemaha 89'	Report	Koller (yellow card) 56'	Stadium: Oláh Gábor utcai Stadion; Attendance: 5,000; Referee: Ferenc Bede; Assistant referees: Dr. Zsolt Varga, Zoltán Pápai; Fourth official: Tibor Gyarmati II

25 May 2008 29	Fehérvár	1–0	Siófok	Székesfehérvár
18:00 CEST (UTC+2)	B. Farkas (yellow card) 23'; Koller (yellow card) 48'; Mohl (red card) 51'; D. Nagy 76'; Sitku (yellow card) 90+2'	Report	László (yellow card) 29'; Sütő (yellow card) 64'; Forgács (yellow card) 70'	Stadium: Sóstói Stadion; Attendance: 2,825; Referee: Viktor Kassai; Assistant referees: György Ring, István Szécsényi; Fourth official: Gábor Oláh

2 June 2008 30	Zalaegerszeg	1–3	Fehérvár	Zalaegerszeg
18:00 CEST (UTC+2)	Polgár (yellow card) 45'; Pekič 73'	Report	G. Horváth II 42', (yellow card) 90'; D. Nagy 51'; Sitku 83'	Stadium: ZTE Arena; Attendance: 2,000; Referee: Péter Solymosi; Assistant referees: Gábor Takács, Oszkár Lémon; Fourth official: Dávid Ákos

=== Magyar Kupa ===
29 August 2007 Third round	BKV Előre	0–5	Fehérvár	Budapest
16:30 CEST (UTC+2)	A. Varga (yellow card) 78'	Report	Dvéri 26', 83'; D. Nagy 46'; Sitku 62', 70'; Vayer (yellow card) 82'	Stadium: Sport utcai Stadion; Attendance: 200; Referee: Ádám Németh; Assistant referees: Balázs Farkas, István Szécsényi

26 September 2007 Round of 32	Velence	0–12	Fehérvár	Velence
15:00 CEST (UTC+2)	Z. Németh (yellow card) 49'	Report	Csobánki 5'; Dvéri 8', 42', (yellow card) 33'; Sitku 16', 43', 51', 79', 82'; Disztl 61', 83', 85'; D. Nagy 65'	Stadium: Velencei Sportpálya; Attendance: 700; Referee: Gergő Király

==== Round of 16 ====
24 October 2007 First leg	Győr	1–1	Fehérvár	Győr
14:30 CEST (UTC+2)	Stark (red card) 34'; Brnović 45'	Report	Sitku 43'	Stadium: ETO Park; Attendance: 500; Referee: Sándor Andó-Szabó; Assistant referees: György Ring, Balázs Farkas

7 November 2007 Second leg	Fehérvár	3–2 (4–3 agg.)	Győr	Székesfehérvár
18:00 CET (UTC+1)	Sitku 14', (yellow card) 85'; Dvéri 31', (yellow card) 85'; Koller 42'; Dajić (yellow card) 50'	Report	Z. Kovács II (yellow card) 45'; Nikolov (yellow card) 77'; L. Varga 84'; Granát 87'	Stadium: Sóstói Stadion; Attendance: 250; Referee: Tamás Bognár; Assistant referees: Zoltán Kovács, Oszkár Lémon
Note: Fehérvár won 4–3 on aggregate.

==== Quarter-finals ====
19 March 2008 First leg	Fehérvár	2–1	Debrecen	Székesfehérvár
18:00 CET (UTC+1)	B. Farkas 4'; Lázár (yellow card) 39'; Sitku 66'	Report	Szűcs (red card) 3'; Leandro 59'	Stadium: Sóstói Stadion; Attendance: 1,500; Referee: Mihály Fábián; Assistant referees: Dr. Zsolt Varga, Tamás Márkus

27 March 2008 Second leg	Debrecen	3–1 (4–3 agg.)	Fehérvár	Debrecen
18:00 CET (UTC+1)	Bíró (yellow card) 14'; Bogdanović 31'; Kerekes 55'; Ďurica 86' (o.g.); T. Sándor (yellow card) 90'	Report	Mohl (yellow card) 10'; Koller 84'; Sitku (yellow card) 90+1'	Stadium: Oláh Gábor utcai Stadion; Attendance: 4,000; Referee: Ferenc Bede; Assistant referees: Gábor Erős, Gyula Ortó
Note: Debrecen won 4–3 on aggregate.

=== Ligakupa ===
==== Autumn season ====
===== Group stage =====
Pos	Team	Pld	W	D	L	GF	GA	GD	Pts	Qualification	FEH	UJP	HON	PAK
1	Fehérvár	6	3	1	2	15	9	+6	10	Advance to knockout phase	—	3–0	2–2	3–1
2	Újpest	6	3	1	2	15	14	+1	10	Advance to knockout phase	4–3	—	4–5	4–1
3	Budapest Honvéd	6	2	2	2	12	16	−4	8		0–3	1–1	—	4–2
4	Paks	6	2	0	4	11	14	−3	6		2–1	1–2	4–0	—

Source: HFF

15 August 2007 1	Fehérvár	3–0	Újpest	Székesfehérvár
19:00 CEST (UTC+2)	G. Horváth II 7'; Csobánki (yellow card) 53'; D. Nagy (yellow card) 56'; Vayer 66'; Dvéri (yellow card) 77', (goal) 87'	Report	Tolnai (yellow card) 89'	Stadium: Sóstói Stadion; Attendance: 1,000; Referee: Zsolt Szabó; Assistant referees: Róbert Kispál, Zsolt Butkai

22 August 2007 2	Paks	2–1	Fehérvár	Paks
16:00 CEST (UTC+2)	S. Horváth (yellow card) 35', (goal) 49'; Zs. Fehér 47' (o.g.); Kőkuti (yellow card) 90'	Report	Vadász (yellow card) 55'; Zs. Fehér 80'	Stadium: Fehérvári úti Stadion; Attendance: 300; Referee: Sándor Andó-Szabó; Assistant referees: Vencel Tóth II, Zoltán Szalai

9 September 2007 3	Fehérvár	2–2	Honvéd	Székesfehérvár
19:00 CEST (UTC+2)	Simek 15'; Sitku (yellow card) 67', (goal) 89'; G. Horváth II (yellow card) 74'	Report	Dieng 42'; G. Vincze (yellow card) 50'; Bárányos 61'; Pomper (yellow card) 79'; Smiljanić (yellow card) 83'	Stadium: Sóstói Stadion; Attendance: 519; Referee: Zsolt Szabó; Assistant referees: Róbert Kispál, István Tóth

18 September 2007 4	Honvéd	0–3	Fehérvár	Budapest
18:00 CEST (UTC+2)	Genito (yellow card) 29'; Koós (yellow card) 38'	Report	Dajić 49'; G. Horváth II (yellow card) 66'; Kocsis 67'; Božić (yellow card) 71'; B. Farkas 89'	Stadium: Bozsik József Stadion; Attendance: 500; Referee: József Berger; Assistant referees: Tibor Vígh, Attila Forgács

2 October 2007 5	Újpest	4–3	Fehérvár	Budapest
17:00 CEST (UTC+2)	Kéthévoama (yellow card) 28', (goal) 50'; Dourandi 64'; Tisza 67'; Z. Kovács I 82'	Report	Dajić 22', 90'; Božić 44'; Csobánki (yellow card) 49'; Disztl (yellow card) 69'	Stadium: Szusza Ferenc Stadion; Attendance: 500; Referee: István Vad; Assistant referees: Zoltán Tompos, Zsolt Butkai

9 October 2007 6	Fehérvár	3–1	Paks	Székesfehérvár
17:00 CEST (UTC+2)	Kocsis 6'; G. Horváth II (yellow card) 12'; Simek (yellow card) 18'; Koller (yellow card) 61'; B. Farkas 65'; Csobánki (yellow card) 72'; Sitku 83'	Report	Balaskó 21'	Stadium: Sóstói Stadion; Attendance: 243; Referee: Ferenc Bede; Assistant referees: Imre Attila Nagy, Tamás Raff

===== Knockout phase =====
====== Quarter-finals ======
17 October 2007 First leg	Fehérvár	1–1	Győr	Székesfehérvár
17:00 CEST (UTC+2)	Dvéri (yellow card) 51'; Božić (yellow card) 54'; Sitku 63'	Report	Tokody 81'	Stadium: Sóstói Stadion; Attendance: 200; Referee: Zoltán Iványi; Assistant referees: János Medovarszki, Dr. Ádám Vári

27 October 2007 Secong leg	Győr	2–2 (3–3 (a) agg.)	Fehérvár	Győr
13:30 CEST (UTC+2)	Nikolov (red card) 35'; Bogdanović 36'; Z. Kovács II (yellow card) 81'; Brnović 85'	Report	Disztl 6'; Á. Horváth 32', (yellow card) 33'; Pálfi (yellow card) 38'; Dajić (yellow card) 90'	Stadium: ETO Park; Attendance: 400; Referee: Roland Veizer (Hungary); Assistant referees: Gábor Erős (Hungary), Dharman (Qatar)
Note: 3–3 on aggregate. Fehérvár won on away goals.

====== Semi-finals ======
31 October 2007 First leg	Zalaegerszeg	2–1	Fehérvár	Zalaegerszeg
17:00 CET (UTC+1)	Méyé 54'; Botiș 70'; Vulin (yellow card) 71'	Report	Sitku 38', (yellow card) 42'; Dajić (yellow card) 59'; G. Horváth II (yellow card) 64'; Csobánki (yellow card) 76'	Stadium: ZTE Arena; Attendance: 1,500; Referee: Viktor Kassai; Assistant referees: Tibor Vámos, Ferenc Varga

14 November 2007 Second leg	Fehérvár	3–1 (a.e.t.) (4–3 agg.)	Zalaegerszeg	Székesfehérvár
18:00 CET (UTC+1)	Mészáros (yellow card) 26'; Dajić (yellow card) 46'; Sitku 70' (pen.), 116' (pen.); Á. Horváth (red card) 76'; Božić 90+2'	Report	Botiș (yellow card) 10'; P. Máté I (yellow card) 11'; Kádár (not on pitch) (yellow card) 11'; Méyé 45'; B. Molnár (yellow card) 48'	Stadium: Sóstói Stadion; Attendance: 152; Referee: Sándor Andó-Szabó; Assistant referees: Zsolt Butkai, György Ring
Note: Fehérvár won 4–3 on aggregate.

====== Final ======
18 November 2007 First leg	Fehérvár	3–0	Diósgyőr	Székesfehérvár
18:00 CET (UTC+1)	Božić (yellow card) 8'; Simek 38'; Dvéri 51'; Sitku 59'; G. Horváth II (red card) 90'	Report	Guyazou (red card) 34'	Stadium: Sóstói Stadion; Attendance: 1,000; Referee: Ferenc Bede; Assistant referees: Gyula Fehér, István Tóth; Fourth official: Ádám Németh

28 November 2007 Second leg	Diósgyőr	2–1 (2–4 agg.)	Fehérvár	Miskolc
18:00 CET (UTC+1)	A. Simon 77'; Huszák 84'	Report	Sitku 70', (yellow card) 72'; Mohl (yellow card) 74'; B. Farkas (yellow card) 83'; Vayer (yellow card) 86'; Csobánki (red card) 89'	Stadium: Diósgyőri Stadion; Attendance: 1,000; Referee: Zsolt Szabó; Assistant referees: Róbert Kispál, Dr. Péter Hegyi; Fourth official: Péter Pető
Note: Fehérvár won 4–2 on aggregate and advanced to the Grand final.

==== Spring season ====
===== Group stage =====
Pos	Team	Pld	W	D	L	GF	GA	GD	Pts	Qualification	PAK	SIO	KAP	FEH
1	Paks	6	5	0	1	16	10	+6	15	Advance to knockout phase	—	3–0	2–1	3–1
2	Siófok	6	3	0	3	15	13	+2	9	Advance to knockout phase	4–2	—	1–2	4–2
3	Kaposvár	6	3	0	3	11	11	0	9		4–5	2–1	—	2–0
4	Fehérvár	6	1	0	5	7	15	−8	3		0–1	2–5	2–0	—

Source: HFF

30 November 2007 1	Paks	3–1	Fehérvár	Székesfehérvár (Note: The match was played at the Sóstói Stadion in Székesfehérvár, instead of Paks regular stadium, the Fehérvári úti Stadion in Paks.)
11:00 CET (UTC+1)	Balaskó 21'; T. Kiss I 49'; Vári 50'; Z. Molnár (red card) 89'	Report	Disztl 75'	Stadium: Sóstói Stadion; Attendance: 50; Referee: Ádám Németh; Assistant referees: Zoltán Tompos, György Ring

5 December 2007 2	Fehérvár	2–5	Siófok	Székesfehérvár
14:00 CET (UTC+1)	Disztl 39', 49'; Sötét (yellow card) 76'	Report	Gajda 3'; S. Kanta 17'; Miklósvári 23', 75', (yellow card) 61'; Melczer 72'	Stadium: Sóstói Stadion; Attendance: 150; Referee: Szabolcs Szilasi; Assistant referees: Tamás Raff, Tamás Péter

8 December 2007 3	Kaposvár	2–0	Fehérvár	Kaposvár (Note: The match was played at the Cseri út in Kaposvár, instead of Kaposvár regular stadium, the Rákóczi Stadion.)
13:00 CET (UTC+1)	Božović 44', 56'	Report	Janovics (yellow card) 56'	Stadium: Cseri úti Sporttelep; Attendance: 200; Referee: Gábor Oláh; Assistant referees: István Iványi, Ferenc Varga

16 February 2008 4	Fehérvár	2–0	Kaposvár	Székesfehérvár
14:00 CET (UTC+1)	Simek 19'; B. Farkas 62'	Report	R. Horváth (yellow card) 67'	Stadium: Sóstói Stadion; Attendance: 200; Referee: Szabolcs Szilasi; Assistant referees: Gábor Takács, Oszkár Lémon

20 February 2008 5	Fehérvár	0–1	Paks	Székesfehérvár
14:00 CET (UTC+1)		Report	Hanák (yellow card) 13'; Weitner 37', (yellow card) 82'; Kriston (yellow card) 64'	Stadium: Sóstói Stadion; Attendance: 100; Referee: József Erdős; Assistant referees: Zsolt Butkai, Ferenc Varga

27 February 2008 6	Siófok	4–2	Fehérvár	Siófok
14:00 CET (UTC+1)	Sütő 9'; Gajda 22'; Magasföldi 34'; Popović (yellow card) 62'; Miklósvári 66'	Report	Fejes (yellow card) 9'; Csobánki 61', 81'; Konečný (yellow card) 71'	Stadium: Révész Géza utcai Stadion; Attendance: 200; Referee: Csaba Pintér; Assistant referees: Dr. Péter Szabó, Balázs Huszár

==== Grand final ====
14 May 2008 First leg	Fehérvár	1–0	Debrecen	Székesfehérvár
18:00 CEST (UTC+2)	Dajić 22'; D. Nagy (yellow card) 87'	Report	Fodor (yellow card) 45'	Stadium: Sóstói Stadion; Attendance: 1,865; Referee: Tamás Bognár; Assistant referees: Gábor Takács, Oszkár Lémon; Fourth official: Csaba Pintér

20 May 2008 Second leg	Debrecen	0–2 (0–3 agg.)	Fehérvár	Debrecen
20:45 CEST (UTC+2)	Rudolf (yellow card) 32'; Szűcs (yellow card) 66'	Report	Dajić (yellow card) 36'; Sifter 58'; Sitku 71'; Csobánki (yellow card) 90'	Stadium: Oláh Gábor utcai Stadion; Attendance: 1,500; Referee: Zoltán Iványi; Assistant referees: István Albert, János Medovarszki; Fourth official: Attila Hegedűs
Note: Fehérvár won 3–0 on aggregate.
