= 2008 Ligakupa final =

1st Ligakupa final
- Event: 2007–08 Ligakupa
Fehérvár	Debrecen
3	0
- on aggregate

First leg
Fehérvár	Debrecen
1	0
- Date: 14 May 2008
- Venue: Sóstói Stadion, Székesfehérvár
- Referee: Tamás Bognár
- Attendance: 1,865

Second leg
Debrecen	Fehérvár
0	2
- Date: 20 May 2008
- Venue: Oláh Gábor utcai Stadion, Debrecen
- Referee: Zoltán Iványi
- Attendance: 1,500

The 2008 Ligakupa final, also referred to as the Grand final, was the final of the inaugural Ligakupa, Hungary's League Cup. It was contested between Fehérvár, the winners of the autumn season, and Debrecen, the winners of the spring season. Because the two seasonal competitions were won by different clubs, a Grand final was required to determine the overall Ligakupa champion.

The final was played over two legs. The first leg took place on 14 May 2008 in Székesfehérvár, where Fehérvár defeated Debrecen 1–0 through a goal by Jusuf Dajić. The second leg was played on 20 May in Debrecen, where Fehérvár won 2–0 with goals from Tamás Sifter and Illés Zsolt Sitku. Fehérvár therefore won the final 3–0 on aggregate, becoming the first Ligakupa champions.

== Route to the final ==
Note: In all results below, the score of the finalist is given first (H: home; A: away).

Autumn season Fehérvár				Round	Spring season Debrecen			
Opponent	Result			Group stage	Opponent	Result		
Újpest	3–0 (H)			Matchday 1	Rákospalota	1–3 (A)		
Paks	1–2 (A)			Matchday 2	Nyíregyháza	2–1 (H)		
Honvéd	2–2 (H)			Matchday 3	Honvéd	2–1 (H)		
Honvéd	3–0 (A)			Matchday 4	Honvéd	2–1 (A)		
Újpest	3–4 (A)			Matchday 5	Rákospalota	3–2 (H)		
Paks	3–1 (H)			Matchday 6	Nyíregyháza	0–0 (A)		
Group A winners: Pos / Team / Pld / Pts; 1 / Fehérvár / 6 / 10; 2 / Újpest / 6 / 10; 3 / Honvéd / 6 / 8; 4 / Paks / 6 / 6; Source: HFF				Final standings	Group C winners: Pos / Team / Pld / Pts; 1 / Debrecen / 6 / 13; 2 / Rákospalota / 6 / 9; 3 / Honvéd / 6 / 8; 4 / Nyíregyháza / 6 / 2; Source: HFF			
Opponent	Agg.	1st leg	2nd leg	Knockout phase	Opponent	Agg.	1st leg	2nd leg
Győr	3–3 (a)	1–1 (H)	2–2 (A)	Quarter-finals	Újpest	10–1	5–1 (A)	5–0 (H)
Zalaegerszeg	4–3	1–2 (A)	3–1 (a.e.t.) (H)	Semi-finals	Siófok	2–0	2–0 (H)	0–0 (A)
Diósgyőr	4–2	3–0 (H)	1–2 (A)	Final	Győr	6–2	0–2 (A)	6–0 (H)

== First leg ==
14 May 2008
18:00 CEST

Fehérvár	1–0	Debrecen
Dajić 22'	Report

Sóstói Stadion, Székesfehérvár
Attendance: 1,865
Referee: Tamás Bognár

GK	1	(Hungary) Zsolt Sebők
DF	2	(Ukraine) Mykhaylo Denysov
DF	23	(Hungary) Zsolt Fehér
DF	28	(Hungary) Zsolt Bencze
DF	4	(Hungary) Dávid Mohl
MF	14	(Hungary) Balázs Farkas		(substituted off) 46'
MF	18	(Hungary) Ádám Csobánki
MF	15	(Hungary) Dániel Nagy	(yellow card) 87'
MF	25	(Hungary) Viktor Vadász
MF	21	(Hungary) Géza Gulyás		(substituted off) 81'
FW	11	(Bosnia and Herzegovina) Jusuf Dajić		(substituted off) 87'
Substitutes:
GK	12	(Hungary) Viktor Németh
DF	24	(Hungary) András Fejes		(substituted on) 81'
MF	17	(Hungary) István Sándor
MF	27	(Hungary) Balázs Magyar		(substituted on) 46'
FW	19	(Hungary) Péter Lelkes		(substituted on) 87'
Manager:
(Hungary) László Disztl

GK	12	(Hungary) János Balogh
DF	22	(Hungary) Csaba Bernáth
DF	2	(Hungary) István Szűcs
DF	3	(Hungary) Csaba Szatmári
DF	21	(Hungary) Marcell Fodor	(yellow card) 45'
MF	23	(Hungary) Péter Szilágyi		(substituted off) 35'
MF	27	(Hungary) Gábor Demjén
MF	29	(Hungary) István Spitzmüller
MF	32	(North Macedonia) Aco Stojkov		(substituted off) 46'
FW	14	(Hungary) Gergely Rudolf
FW	26	(Cameroon) Dani Chigou		(substituted off) 67'
Substitutes:
GK	24	(Hungary) Norbert Csernyánszki
DF	11	(Hungary) Gergő Oláh
DF	25	(Hungary) Szilárd Éles		(substituted on) 35'
DF	28	(Hungary) Zoltán Nagy		(substituted on) 46'
MF	15	(Hungary) László Rezes		(substituted on) 67'
MF	20	(Hungary) Róbert Nagy
MF	37	(Brazil) Lucas
Manager:
(Hungary) András Herczeg

Assistant referees:
Gábor Takács
Oszkár Lémon
Fourth official:
Csaba Pintér

== Second leg ==
20 May 2008
20:45 CEST

Debrecen	0–2	Fehérvár
	Report	Sifter 58'; Sitku 71'

Oláh Gábor utcai Stadion, Debrecen
Attendance: 1,500
Referee: Zoltán Iványi

GK	24	(Hungary) Norbert Csernyánszki
DF	28	(Hungary) Zoltán Nagy
DF	2	(Hungary) István Szűcs	(yellow card) 66'
DF	6	(Hungary) Zoltán Takács		(substituted off) 67'
DF	3	(Hungary) Csaba Szatmári
MF	20	(Hungary) Róbert Nagy
MF	27	(Hungary) Gábor Demjén
MF	88	(Hungary) Tamás Huszák		(substituted off) 60'
MF	15	(Hungary) László Rezes		(substituted off) 52'
FW	10	(Serbia) Igor Bogdanović
FW	14	(Hungary) Gergely Rudolf	(yellow card) 32'
Substitutes:
GK	12	(Hungary) János Balogh
DF	11	(Hungary) Gergő Oláh
MF	7	(Hungary) Tibor Dombi		(substituted on) 52'
MF	29	(Hungary) István Spitzmüller		(substituted on) 67'
MF	37	(Brazil) Lucas
FW	23	(Hungary) Péter Szilágyi
FW	26	(Cameroon) Dani Chigou		(substituted on) 60'
Manager:
(Hungary) András Herczeg

GK	12	(Hungary) Viktor Németh
DF	20	(Hungary) Pál Lázár
DF	23	(Hungary) Zsolt Fehér
DF	5	(Hungary) Ákos Koller
DF	4	(Hungary) Dávid Mohl		(substituted off) 73'
MF	14	(Hungary) Balázs Farkas
MF	6	(Hungary) Tamás Sifter
MF	7	(Hungary) Péter Simek		(substituted off) 30'
MF	8	(Hungary) Attila Polonkai		(substituted off) 78'
MF	11	(Bosnia and Herzegovina) Jusuf Dajić	(yellow card) 36'
FW	9	(Hungary) Illés Zsolt Sitku
Substitutes:
GK	31	(Hungary) Péter Halasi
DF	2	(Ukraine) Mykhaylo Denysov		(substituted on) 73'
DF	25	(Hungary) Viktor Vadász		(substituted on) 78'
MF	16	(Hungary) Norbert Lattenstein
MF	21	(Hungary) Géza Gulyás
MF	30	(Hungary) Viktor Bölcsföldi
FW	18	(Hungary) Ádám Csobánki	(yellow card) 90'	(substituted on) 30'
Manager:
(Hungary) László Disztl

Assistant referees:
István Albert
János Medovarszki
Fourth official:
Attila Hegedűs

== See also ==
- 2007–08 FC Fehérvár season
- 2007–08 Debreceni VSC season
