= Lajos Terjék =

Hungarian footballer

Personal information
- Full name: Lajos Terjék
- Date of birth: 29 October 1980 (age 46)
- Place of birth: Budapest, Hungary
- Height: 1.80 m (5 ft 11 in)
- Position: Striker

Youth career
- Újpest FC

Senior career*
Years	Team	Apps	(Gls)
1999–2001	Újpest FC	37	(8)
2001–2003	FC Fehérvár	49	(16)
2003–2004	F.C. Ashdod	20	(3)
2004	Nyíregyháza Spartacus	6	(1)
2004–2006	Enosis Neon Paralimni	31	(1)
2006–2007	FC Fehérvár	11	(1)
2007–2011	Anagennisi Dherynia		
2011–2012	Ayia Napa	28	(5)
2012–2013	Ermis Aradippou	25	(9)
2013–2014	Othellos Athienou	17	(11)
2014–2015	Anagennisi Dherynia	20	(10)
2015–2016	Achyronas Liopetriou	19	(5)
2017	AEN Ayiou Georgiou Vrysoullon-Acheritou	6	(0)

International career
2000–2001	Hungary U21		
- * Club domestic league appearances and goals

Lajos Terjék (born 29 October 1980) is a former Hungarian football player.
