= Aleksandr Alumona =

Russian footballer (born 1983)

Alumona
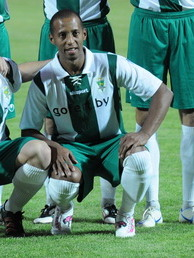
- Alumona in 2012

Personal information
- Full name: Aleksandr Silvesterovich Alumona
- Date of birth: 18 December 1983 (age 42)
- Place of birth: Moscow, Russian SFSR, Soviet Union
- Height: 1.75 m (5 ft 9 in)
- Position: Forward

Team information
- Current team: FC Peresvet Podolsk (administrator)

Youth career
- FC Vityaz Podolsk

Senior career*
Years	Team	Apps	(Gls)
2000–2002	Chekhov (amateur)	1	(0)
2003	Serpukhov	0	(0)
2003–2004	Vác-Újbuda	0	(0)
2004–2007	Fehérvár	44	(4)
2007–2008	Neman Grodno	45	(19)
2009–2010	BATE Borisov	20	(2)
2010–2012	Shakhtyor Soligorsk	56	(18)
2012	Gomel	12	(1)
2013	Naftan Novopolotsk	12	(2)
2013	Tobol Kostanay	11	(1)
2014	Belshina Bobruisk	9	(1)
2014	Kaisar	2	(0)
2014–2016	Isloch Minsk Raion	50	(28)
2016–2017	Tambov	20	(4)
2017–2018	Dynamo Bryansk	18	(5)
2018–2020	Zvezda Serpukhov (amateur)		
2020–2021	Peresvet Podolsk (amateur)		
Total		300	(85)

International career
2002	Russia U19	5	(3)

Managerial career
- 2021–: Peresvet Podolsk (administrator)
- * Club domestic league appearances and goals

Aleksandr Silvestrovich Alumona (Russian: Александр Сильвестрович Алумона; born 18 December 1983) is a Russian football official and a former player who played as a forward. He works as an administrator with Peresvet Podolsk.

== Club career ==
Aleksandr Alumona was a member of the Chekhov team but never made an appearance. He then moved to Serpukhov for the 2003 season, and then to Vác-Újbuda LTC in Hungary. During this time Aleksandr Alumona did not made an appearance. Transferred in 2004 to FC Fehérvár, he made 44 league appearances and scored 4 goals, eight appearances in the Hungarian Cup, scoring one goal and two appearances in the UEFA Cup.

He then transferred to Neman Grodno in 2007, where he made 45 league appearances and scored 19 goals. While at Neman Grodno he also made six appearances in the Belarusian Cup and scored four goals. He then transferred to BATE Borisov. On 22 October 2009, seconds after coming on as a substitute, he scored the deciding goal for BATE in a 2–1 home win against AEK Athens in a Europa League game. On 1 November 2009, he netted his first league goal in 1–1 away draw against Torpedo Zhodino.

On 7 July 2010, Alumona was transferred to Shakhtyor Soligorsk. On 1 August 2010, he scored a hat-trick in a 4–1 home win against Neman Grodno. On 21 November 2010, Alumona scored the winning goal against his former club BATE in a match that ended in a 2–1 loss.

On 25 July 2012, Alumona moved to FC Gomel on a half-year contract. He made his official debut on 2 August in the 1–0 home loss against Liverpool in a UEFA Europa League preliminary round match and played his first league match for the team from Gomel on 17 August — a 0:0 away draw with BATE Borisov.

=== Match fixing ===
In August 2016, Alumona was one of several Isloch Minsk Raion players alleged to be involved in match fixing during their match with Dinamo Brest on 30 April 2016. On 20 February 2018, the BFF banned Alumona for 24 months for his involvement in the match fixing between Isloch Minsk Raion and Dinamo Brest in April 2016.

== Career statistics ==
Appearances and goals by club, season and competition
Club	Season	League		National cup		League cup		Europe		Other		Total	
Club	Season	Apps	Goals	Apps	Goals	Apps	Goals	Apps	Goals	Apps	Goals	Apps	Goals
FC Fehérvár	2004–05	8	1	1	0	0	0	0	0	0	0	9	1
FC Fehérvár	2005–06	23	2	6	1	0	0	0	0	0	0	29	3
FC Fehérvár	2006–07	13	1	1	0	0	0	2	0	0	0	16	1
FC Fehérvár	Total	44	4	8	1	0	0	2	0	0	0	54	5
Neman Grodno	2007	24	9	4	3	0	0	0	0	0	0	28	12
Neman Grodno	2008	21	10	2	1	0	0	0	0	0	0	23	11
Neman Grodno	Total	45	19	6	4	0	0	0	0	0	0	51	23
BATE Borisov	2009	0	0	0	0	0	0	1	1	0	0	0	0
Career total		89	23	14	5	0	0	3	1	0	0	106	29

== Honours ==
FC Fehérvár

- Hungarian Cup: 2005–06
