= Zoltán Vincze =

Hungarian footballer

Personal information
- Date of birth: 23 December 1974 (age 51)
- Place of birth: Budapest, Hungary
- Height: 1.74 m (5 ft 9 in)
- Position: Defender

Team information
- Current team: Ceglédi VSE
- Number: 3

Youth career
- Budapest Honvéd FC
- Kecskeméti TE

Senior career*
Years	Team	Apps	(Gls)
1997–1998	Stadler FC	16	(0)
1998–1999	BVSC Budapest	24	(1)
1999–2002	BKV Előre SC	37	(3)
2002–2004	Békéscsaba 1912 Előre SE	63	(3)
2004–2007	Videoton FC	49	(1)
2007–2009	Budapest Honvéd FC	53	(1)
2009–2011	Bajai LSE	12	(0)
2011–	Ceglédi VSE	28	(0)
- * Club domestic league appearances and goals as of 26 November 2011

Zoltán Vincze (born 23 December 1974) is a Hungarian football defender who plays for Ceglédi VSE.
