= Tamás Györök =

Hungarian footballer

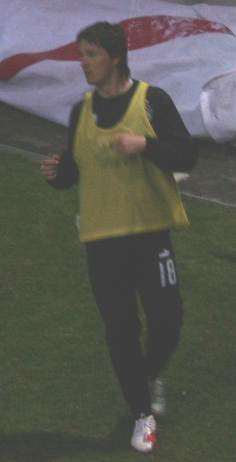

Personal information
- Full name: Tamás Györök
- Date of birth: 18 March 1979 (age 47)
- Place of birth: Mór, Hungary
- Height: 1.79 m (5 ft 10 1/2 in)
- Position: Midfielder

Team information
- Current team: Csákvári TK

Senior career*
Years	Team	Apps	(Gls)
1996–2000	Videoton FC	38	(0)
2000	Veszprémi LC	?	(?)
2000–2001	Videoton FC	0	(0)
2001	BVSC Budapest	?	(?)
2001–2003	Rákospalotai EAC	23	(2)
2003–2004	BFC Siófok	19	(2)
2004–2007	Videoton FC	47	(5)
2007	Niki Volos FC	?	(?)
2007–2008	FC Sopron	6	(0)
2008	Újpest FC	6	(0)
2008–2009	BFC Siófok	6	(0)
2009	USC Mank	?	(?)
2009–2010	SC Ortmann	?	(?)
2010–	Csákvári TK	46	(11)

International career
1996–1997	Hungary U-17	5	(1)
- * Club domestic league appearances and goals as of 10 July 2012

Tamás Györök (born 18 March 1979, in Mór) is a Hungarian football (midfielder) player who currently plays for Csákvári TK.
