= Mykhaylo Denysov =

Ukrainian football player

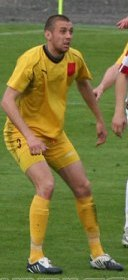

Personal information
- Full name: Mykhaylo Denysov
- Date of birth: 3 October 1985 (age 41)
- Place of birth: Soviet Union
- Height: 1.90 m (6 ft 3 in)
- Position: Defender

Senior career*
Years	Team	Apps	(Gls)
2006–2007	Illichivets-2 Mariupol	20	(0)
2007–2008	Fehérvár	3	(0)
2008–2009	Karvan Evlakh		
2009	Ros' Bila Tserkva	7	(1)
2009	Enerhetyk Burshtyn	5	(0)
2010	Zirka Kirovohrad	11	(0)
2010–	Navbahor Namangan		
- * Club domestic league appearances and goals as of 21 February 2011

Mykhaylo Denysov (born 3 October 1985) is a Ukrainian football player who plays for Uzbek League side FC Navbahor Namangan.
