= Csaba Csizmadia =

Hungarian footballer and manager

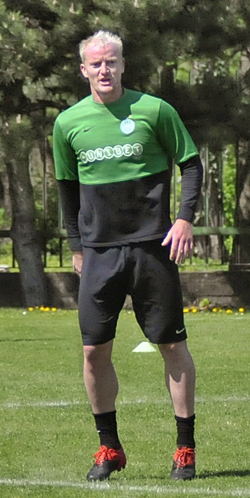

Personal information
- Date of birth: 30 May 1985 (age 41)
- Place of birth: Târgu Mureș, Romania
- Height: 1.85 m (6 ft 1 in)
- Positions: Centre-back; right-back

Youth career
- Târgu Mureş
- UFK 2000
- Kecskemét

Senior career*
| Years | Team | Apps | (Gls) |
| 2004–2006 | Fehérvár | 69 | (9) |
| 2007–2008 | Mattersburg | 65 | (4) |
| 2008–2009 | Grosseto | 5 | (0) |
| 2009–2010 | Slaven Belupo | 15 | (2) |
| 2010–2012 | Ferencváros | 52 | (2) |
| 2012–2014 | Gyirmót | 43 | (5) |
| 2014–2015 | Pápa | 42 | (4) |
| 2015–2016 | Floridsdorfer AC | 15 | (1) |
| 2016–2018 | Budafoki MTE | 70 | (15) |

International career
| 2007–2008 | Hungary | 12 | (0) |
| 2017–2018 | Székely Land | | |

Managerial career
- 2018–2021: Budafok
- 2021–2022: Budafok
- 2023: Gyirmót
- * Club domestic league appearances and goals

Csaba Csizmadia (born 30 May 1985) is a Romanian-born Hungarian football manager and former player who played as a defender.

== International career ==
He represented Hungary in 12 games including 7 games for the UEFA Euro 2008 qualifying campaign.

He was member of the Székely Land squad that finished 3rd at 2017 CONIFA European Football Cup and 4th at the 2018 CONIFA World Football Cup respectively.

== Managerial career ==
He worked as a manager for Budafoki MTE from 2018 to 2021. In the 2019–2020 season the club was promoted to Nemzeti Bajnokság I. This was the first time after 74 years that the club reached the top flight of Hungarian football. He resigned from his job on 24 April 2021 following a 2–9 defeat against Paksi FC.

== Honours ==
Fehérvár

- Magyar Kupa: 2005–06
