= Attila Fekete (footballer) =

Hungarian football defender

Personal information
- Date of birth: 21 July 1987 (age 39)
- Place of birth: Kecskemét, Hungary
- Height: 1.81 m (5 ft 11 in)
- Position: Defender

Team information
- Current team: Ceglédi VSE
- Number: 5

Youth career
- 2003–2005: Kecskeméti TE

Senior career*
Years	Team	Apps	(Gls)
2004–2005	Kecskeméti TE	0	(0)
2005–2008	Videoton FC	6	(0)
2008	→ Kiskunfélegyházi TK (loan)	11	(1)
2008–2009	Kecskeméti TE	0	(0)
2009	Tököl VSK	15	(0)
2009–	Ceglédi VSE	51	(0)
- * Club domestic league appearances and goals as of 19 November 2011

Attila Fekete (born 21 July 1987 in Kecskemét) is a Hungarian football defender who plays for Ceglédi VSE.
