= Viktor Németh =

Hungarian footballer

Personal information
- Full name: Viktor Németh
- Date of birth: 21 April 1977 (age 49)
- Place of birth: Székesfehérvár, Hungary
- Height: 1.86 m (6 ft 1 in)
- Position: Goalkeeper

Team information
- Current team: Kecskemét
- Number: 12

Senior career*
Years	Team	Apps	(Gls)
2001–2002	Dunaújváros	15	(0)
2003	Nyíregyháza	12	(0)
2003–2004	Újpest	0	(0)
2004–2007	Nyíregyháza	43	(0)
2007–2009	Videoton	5	(0)
2009	→ Felcsút (loan)	3	(0)
2009–2011	Tatabánya	18	(0)
2011–2012	Kápolnásnyék	14	(0)
2012	Iváncsa	13	(0)
2012–2013	Budaörs	26	(0)
2013–	Kecskemét	8	(0)
- * Club domestic league appearances and goals as of 18 May 2014

Viktor Németh (born 21 March 1977) is a Hungarian football player who currently plays for Kecskeméti TE.
