= Zsolt Dvéri =

Hungarian footballer

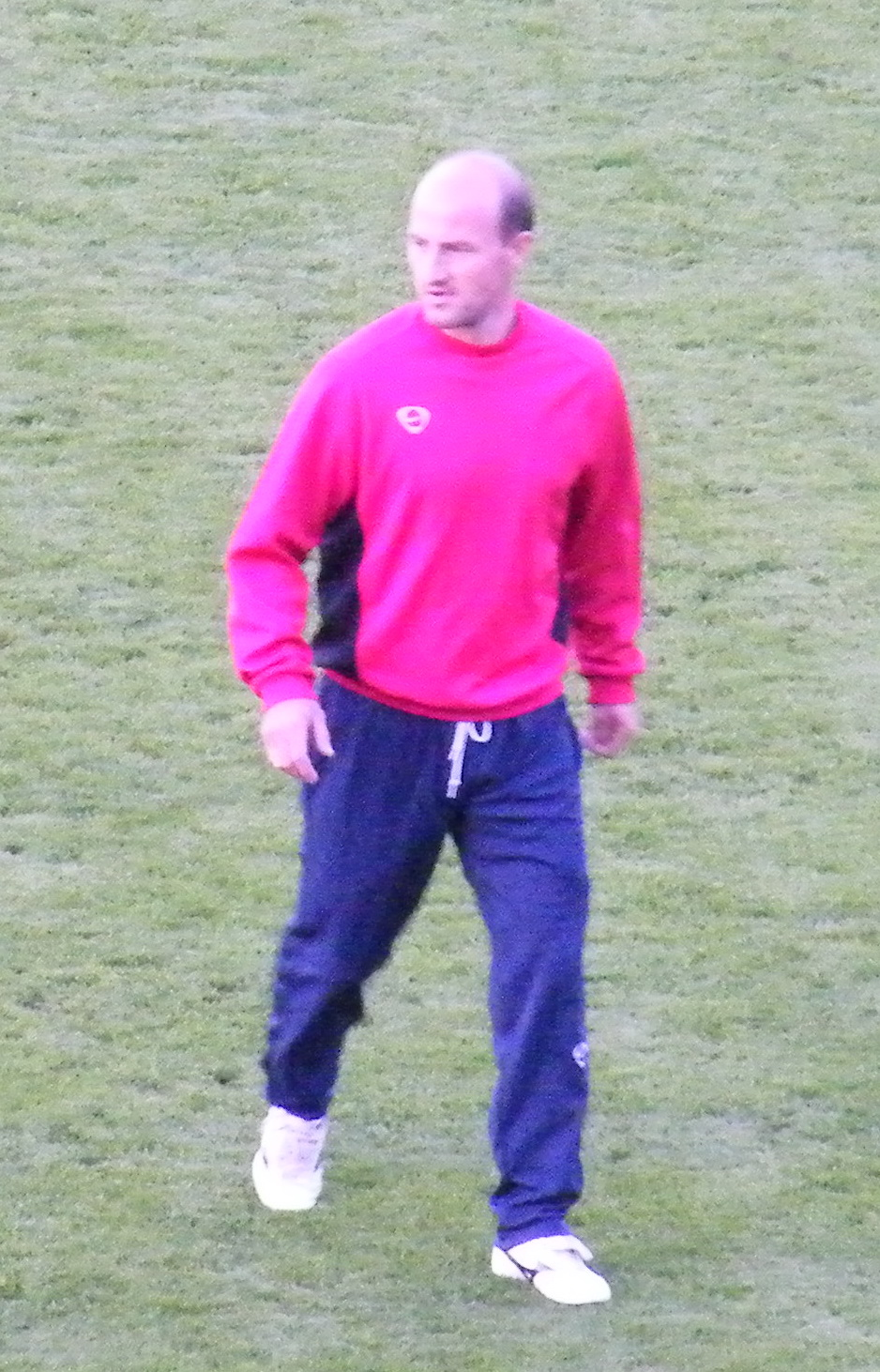

Personal information
- Date of birth: 12 August 1976 (age 50)
- Place of birth: Hungary
- Height: 1.75 m (5 ft 9 in)
- Position: Midfielder

Team information
- Current team: Sárosd NS

Senior career*
Years	Team	Apps	(Gls)
1994–1998	FC Fehérvár	102	(16)
1998–2000	Gázszer FC	46	(6)
2000–2002	Újpest FC	68	(21)
2002–2010	FC Fehérvár	138	(24)
2010–2011	Seregélyes SCE	22	(18)
2011–	Sárosd NS	102	(70)

International career
1996–1997	Hungary U-21	4	(0)
2001–2004	Hungary	4	(0)
- * Club domestic league appearances and goals

Zsolt Dvéri (born 12 August 1976 in Hungary) is a Hungarian former footballer. He played in the Hungary national football team.
