= Ádám Csobánki =

Hungarian footballer

Personal information
- Date of birth: 24 August 1984 (age 42)
- Place of birth: Budapest, Hungary
- Height: 1.84 m (6 ft 0 in)
- Position: Midfielder

Youth career
- –2003: Budafoki LC

Senior career*
Years	Team	Apps	(Gls)
2003–2007	Budapest Honvéd FC		
2004	→ Kecskeméti TE (loan)		
2007–2010	Videoton FC		
2009	→ Rákospalotai EAC (loan)		
2010–2019	Budaörsi SC		
- * Club domestic league appearances and goals

Ádám Csobánki (born 24 August 1984) is a retired Hungarian football midfielder.
