= Péter Simek =

Hungarian footballer

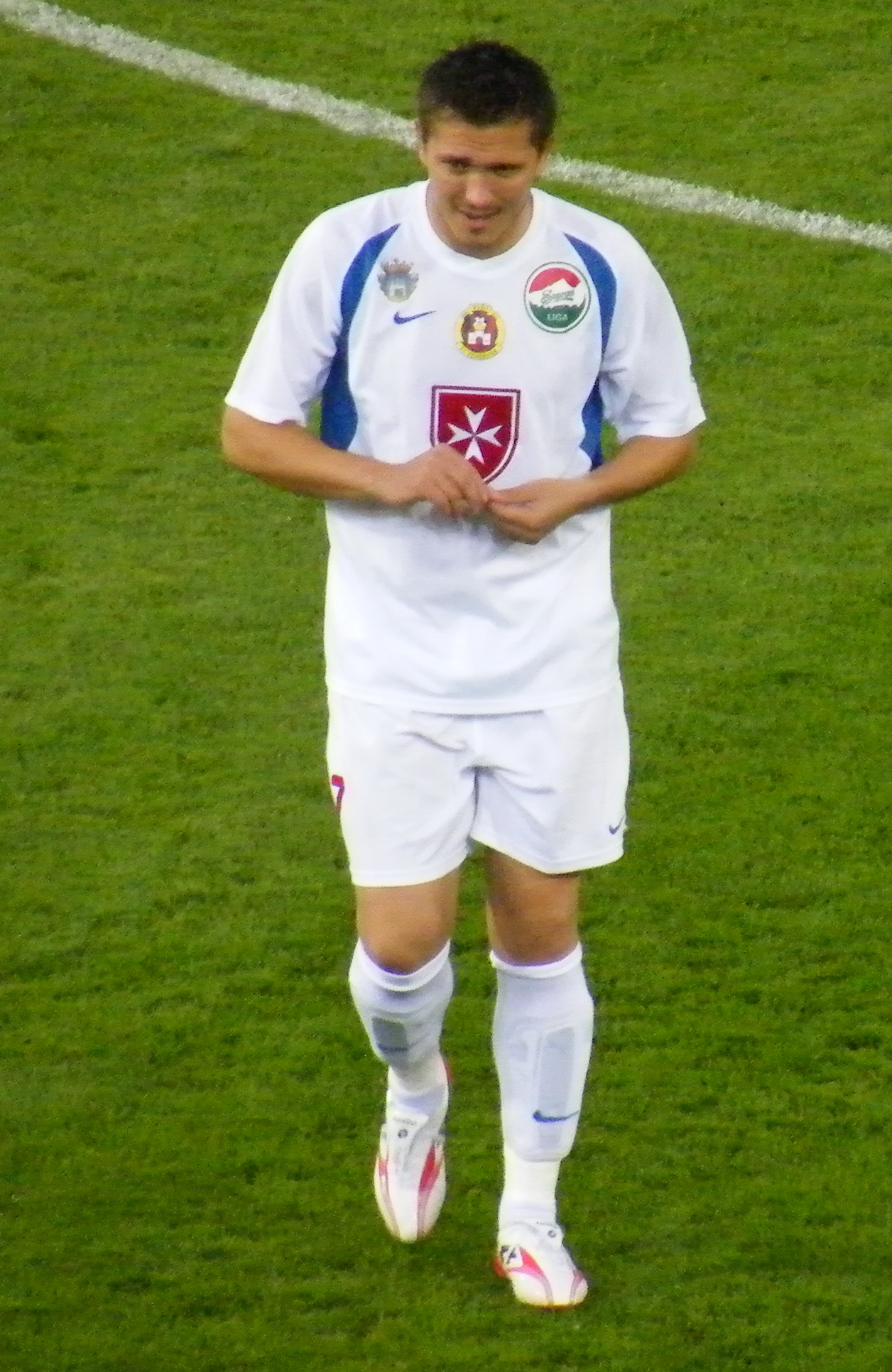

Personal information
- Date of birth: 30 January 1980 (age 46)
- Place of birth: Mór, Hungary
- Height: 1.84 m (6 ft 1/2 in)
- Position: Right midfielder

Senior career*
Years	Team	Apps	(Gls)
1997–1998	Videoton FC	9	(0)
1998–2000	Gázszer FC	40	(1)
2000–2002	Vasas SC	62	(6)
2002–2005	Újpest FC	76	(11)
2005–2009	Videoton FC	51	(6)
2006	→ Politehnica Timişoara (loan)	4	(0)
2009	→ Újpest FC (loan)	12	(0)
2009–2011	Újpest FC	46	(3)
2011–2013	Vasas SC	9	(0)
2013	REAC	1	(0)
2014	Bakonycsernye		
2014	Aszód		

International career
1996–1997	Hungary U-17	3	(0)
1998–1999	Hungary U-18	5	(0)
1998–2000	Hungary U-21	5	(0)
2003–2005	Hungary	9	(0)
- * Club domestic league appearances and goals

Péter Simek (born 30 January 1980 in Mór, Hungary) is a retired Hungarian football player. He generally played as an attacking midfielder right.

After his debut in 1997 at Videoton, he moved to Gázszer FC in 1999, where he stayed for two seasons. Vasas SC was next to buy him. With his new team, Simek managed to reach the UEFA Cup. His career peak was still ahead of him and it occurred at Újpest FC. While at the Budapest based club, Simek earned himself the first call-up at the Hungary national football team. However, he did not continue at Ujpest, despite three successful seasons there, and returned to his first club, now called Videoton Fehérvár. Although plagued by an injury before the 2005/2006 season, Simek managed to impress as soon as he returned on the pitch and attracted the attention of Poli Timișoara, who bought him for 480.000 dollars. After an unsuccessful season plagued with another serious knee injury he returned to Fehérvár. In February 2009 Újpest FC loaned him for half plus one year.

Simek has 9 caps for the Hungary national team.

== Honours ==
Újpest

- Szuperkupa: 2002

Fehérvár

- Magyar Kupa: 2005–06
- Ligakupa: 2007–08, 2008–09
