= Gábor Kocsis =

Hungarian football player

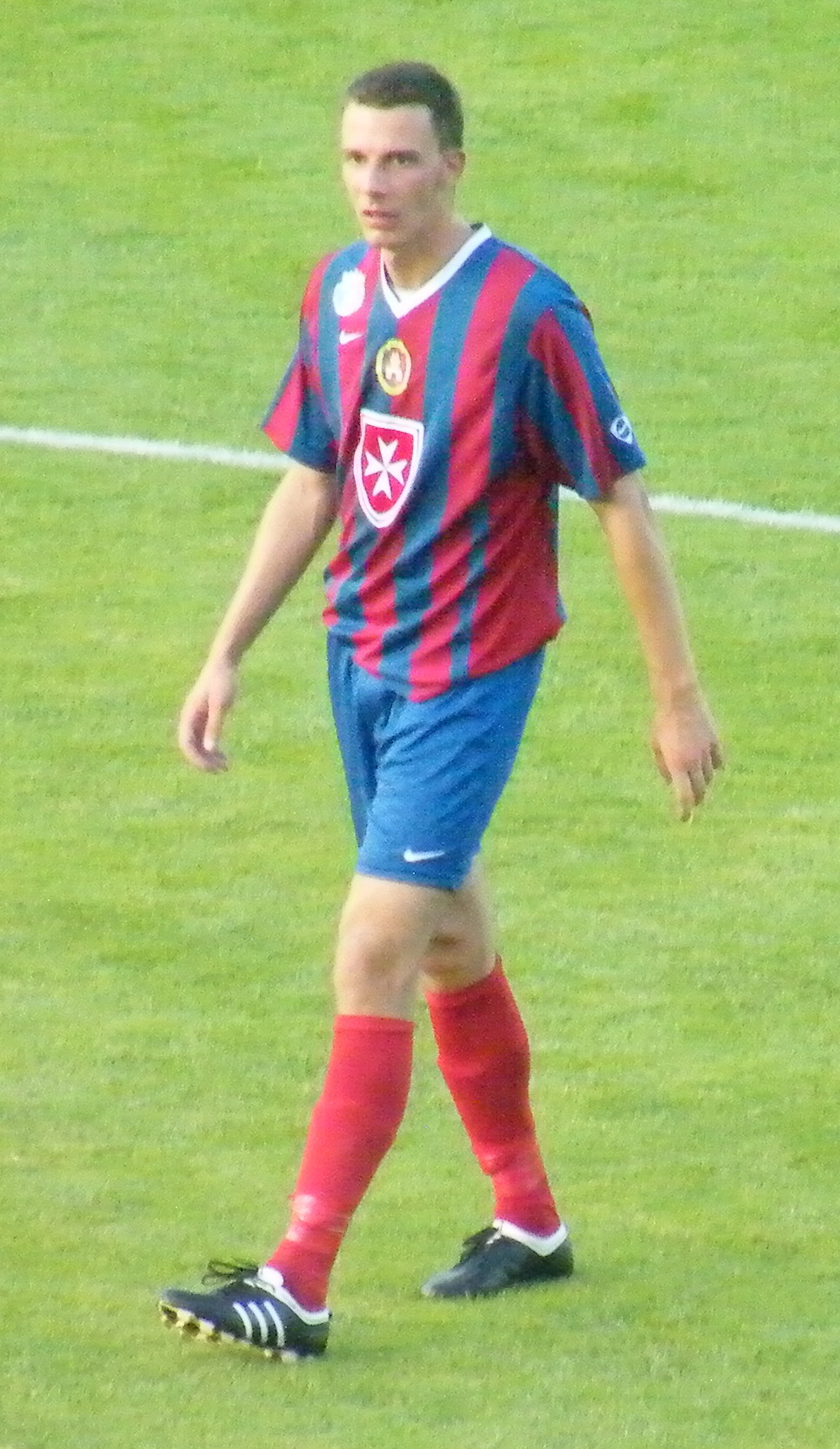

Personal information
- Full name: Gábor Kocsis
- Date of birth: 30 November 1985 (age 40)
- Place of birth: Kiskunhalas, Hungary
- Height: 1.86 m (6 ft 1 in)
- Position: Central midfielder

Team information
- Current team: Dunaújváros
- Number: 14

Youth career
- 2003–2004: Dunaferr

Senior career*
Years	Team	Apps	(Gls)
2004–2005	Dunaferr	23	(2)
2005–2011	Videoton	36	(0)
2008–2009	→ Felcsút (loan)	14	(2)
2010–2011	→ Siófok (loan)	9	(0)
2011–2012	Vasas	13	(6)
2012–	Dunaújváros	39	(10)
- * Club domestic league appearances and goals as of 3 August 2014

Gábocs Kocsis (born 30 November 1985) is a Hungarian football player who currently plays for Dunaújváros PASE.
