= Dávid Disztl =

Hungarian footballer

Personal information
- Full name: Dávid Disztl
- Date of birth: 5 January 1985 (age 41)
- Place of birth: Székesfehérvár, Hungary
- Height: 1.84 m (6 ft 0 in)
- Position: Forward

Team information
- Current team: KA Akureyrir
- Number: 10

Senior career*
Years	Team	Apps	(Gls)
2003–2004	MTK Budapest FC	0	(0)
2004–2005	Szolnoki MÁV FC	25	(7)
2005–2009	FC Fehérvár	17	(1)
2005–2006	→ BFC Siófok (loan)	14	(3)
2006–2007	→ Budapest Honvéd FC (loan)	12	(2)
2007–2008	→ Felcsút SE (loan)	14	(2)
2009–2010	KA Akureyri	39	(22)
2011	Þór Akureyri	20	(6)
2012	Pálhalma SE	9	(0)
2012	KA Akureyri	18	(5)
- * Club domestic league appearances and goals as of 5 October 2012

Dávid Disztl (born 5 January 1985) is a forward striker footballer. He currently plays for KA Akureyri. He was on the Hungarian Cup winner with FC Fehérvár in 2006 and with Budapest Honvéd FC in 2007.
