= Attila Mészáros =

Hungarian footballer

Personal information
- Date of birth: 16 March 1983 (age 43)
- Height: 1.80 m (5 ft 11 in)
- Position: Defender

Team information
- Current team: VSK Tököl

Youth career
- Budapest Honvéd FC

Senior career*
Years	Team	Apps	(Gls)
2003–2007	Budapest Honvéd FC		
2004	→ Kecskeméti TE (loan)		
2007–2008	FC Fehérvár		
2008	→ FC Dabas (loan)		
2008–2013	Soroksár SC		
2013–2014	Halásztelek FC		
2014–2015	Monori SE		
2015–2016	Újbuda FC		
2016	Csepel FC		
2016–2017	Halásztelek FC		
2017–2019	Örkényi SE		
2019–	VSK Tököl		
- * Club domestic league appearances and goals

Attila Mészáros (born 16 March 1983) is a Hungarian football defender.
