= Sóstói Stadion (1967) =

Football stadium in Székesfehérvár, Hungary

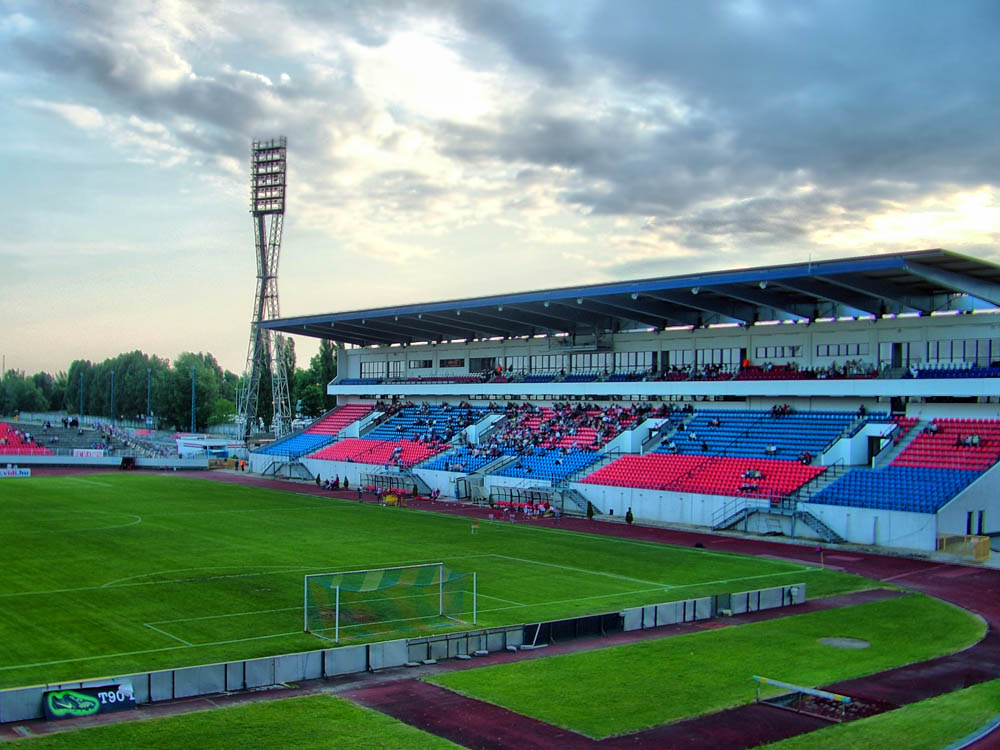
- Interactive map of Sóstói Stadion
- Coordinates: 47°10′25″N 18°24′55″E
- Capacity: 14,300
- Surface: Grass
- Field size: 105 x 68 m

Construction
- Groundbreaking: 1963
- Opened: 1967
- Renovated: 2002–2004
- Demolished: 2016

Tenants
- Videoton FC (1967–2016); Gázszer FC (1997–98)

Sóstói Stadion was a multi-purpose stadium in Székesfehérvár, Hungary, primarily used for football matches. The stadium could hold 14,300 people and was the home of Nemzeti Bajnokság I club Videoton FC. The football arena was opened in 1967 and set its record attendance on 8 May 1985, when 40,000 fans flocked to see the UEFA Cup Final first leg between Videoton and Real Madrid.

== History ==
The construction of the stadium began on 1963, however, following World War II, there were already held matches on that site. It took four years to finish the work, and the inaugural match took place on 30 September 1967, when VT Vasas hosted East German side FC Rot-Weiß Erfurt. Ferenc Bognár was the first ever player to score in the new stadium, hitting a freekick from a distance of 22 meters.

The floodlighting system was set up in 1978, followed by further improvements four years later, which made the Sóstói Stadion one of the most up-to-date football venues in the country that time.

The arena was part of the Hungarian Euro 2004, Euro 2008 and Euro 2012 bids and therefore went through significant developments in the 2000s. The stadium got a new main stand, an improved access control system and CCTV cameras were set up for the complete video surveillance. New media and VIP sections were formed as well to meet the strict criteria of the UEFA.

Although amelioration slowed following the unsuccessful European Championship candidations, Sóstói Stadion still remains one of the best equipped stadiums in Hungary. The floodlights are able to illuminate the field with 1500 lux, and an under soil heating system being installed under the main pitch, making the sports complex available to host UEFA Europa League and UEFA Champions League matches.

On 12 December 2015, Videoton played their last match at Sósóti Stadion against Paksi FC in the 2015–16 Nemzeti Bajnokság I season. The match ended with a 1–0 victory for Videoton. The last goal was scored by Géresi in the 80th minute.

=== Demolition ===
On 18 December 2015, the demolition of the stadium started. First, the iron seats in the away sector will be removed. Second the plastic seats in the home sector will be removed, while in January 2016 the floodlights will be dismantled.

András Cser-Palkovics, mayor of Székesfehérvár, said that most elements of the old stadium will be reused in some stadium in Hungary. The seats of the stadium will be used in other stadiums in Székesfehérvár, in Fejér county including Csákvár, Iszkaszentgyörgy, Sárkeresztúr and abroad. The turf will be reused at the pitch of Ikarus, in Budapest while some devices and items of furniture will be reused in other buildings in Székesfehérvár. Cser-Palkovics also added that 800 seats (200 HUF per seat) were purchased by the fans of Videoton who have season tickets. Those who do not possess season tickets can purchase the seats for 1000 HUF. According to Attila Mészáros, vice-mayor, the demolition is expected to be finished by April 2016. Therefore, the construction can be started in May or June 2016.

== Milestone matches ==
1967	Videoton (Hungary)	3–0	(Hungary) Kecskemét	1967 Nemzeti Bajnokság I First match
		[ (Report)]

12 December 2015	Videoton (Hungary)	1–0	(Hungary) Paks	2015–16 Nemzeti Bajnokság I Last match
	Géresi 80'	(Report)		Attendance: 2,531; Referee: Sándor Andó-Szabó (Hungary)

== International matches ==
The table below shows the matches played by the Hungarian national team in the Sóstói Stadion. Hungary's goals tally first.

Date	Opponent	Result	Competition
29 May 1974	Yugoslavia	4–2	Friendly
23 May 1983	Norway	0–0	Friendly
9 October 1991	Belgium	0–2	Friendly
15 November 2006	Canada	1–0	Friendly
8 September 2007	Bosnia and Herzegovina	1–0	Euro 2008 qualifying
17 November 2010	Lithuania	2–0	Friendly

== Attendances ==
As of 11 April 2017.

Season	Average
2010–11	4,158
2011–12	4,102
2012–13	3,084
2013–14	3,330
2014–15	3,381
