= Illés Zsolt Sitku =

Hungarian footballer

Illés Sitku
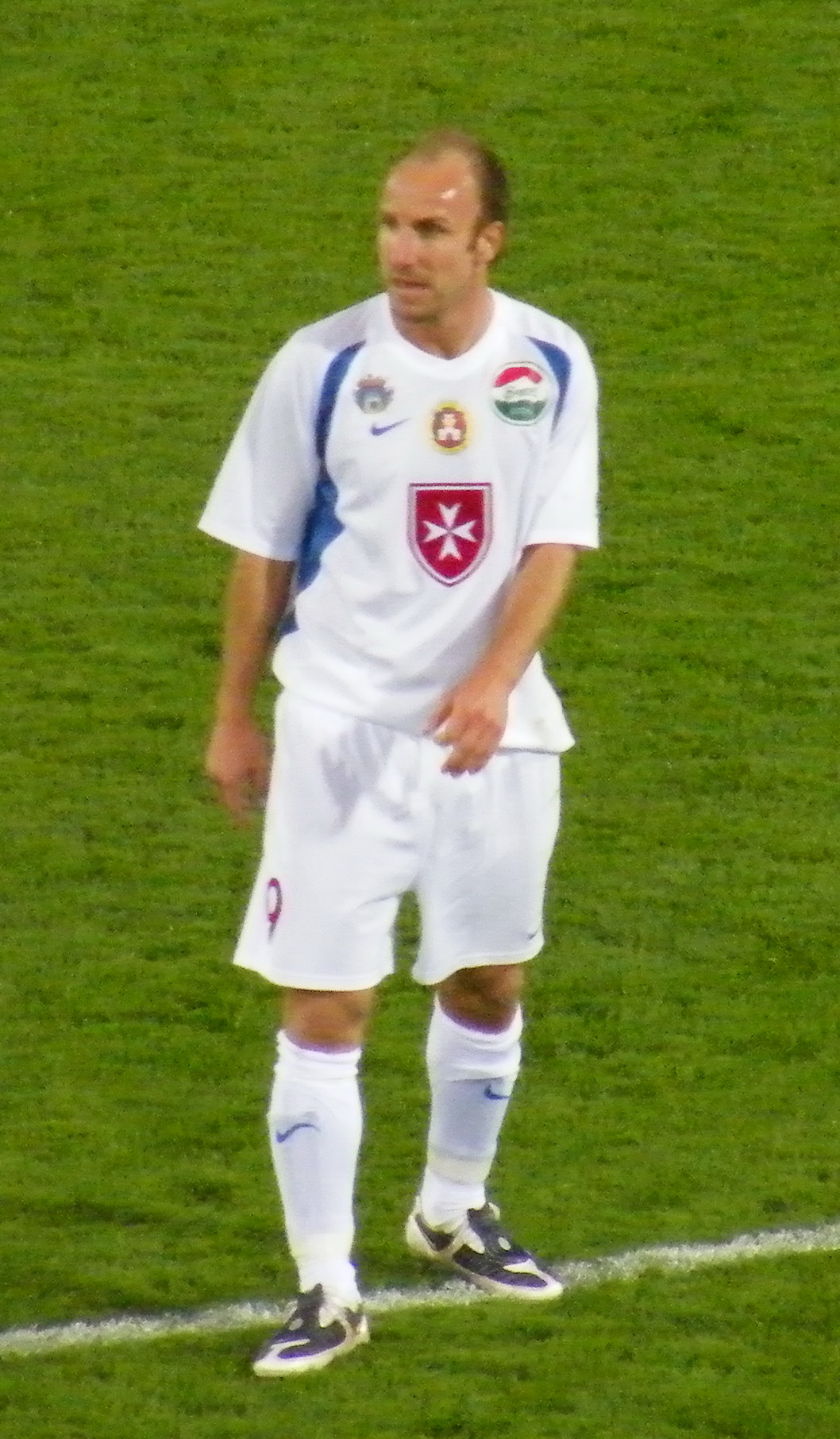

Personal information
- Full name: Zsolt Illés Sitku
- Date of birth: 5 February 1978 (age 48)
- Place of birth: Budapest, Hungary
- Height: 1.78 m (5 ft 10 in)
- Position: Forward

Team information
- Current team: Dunaújváros
- Number: 9

Senior career*
Years	Team	Apps	(Gls)
1997–1999	Ferencváros	8	(0)
1999	→ Budafoki LC (loan)	12	(8)
1999–2000	III. Kerület	35	(7)
2000	Csepel	12	(6)
2000–2002	Pécs	52	(14)
2002–2003	Pápa	33	(11)
2003–2004	Siófok	31	(6)
2004–2005	Debrecen	12	(1)
2005–2011	Videoton	116	(48)
2007	→ Ankaraspor (loan)	10	(2)
2010	→ Újpest (loan)	10	(0)
2011–2012	Tatabánya	26	(12)
2012–2014	Dunaújváros	23	(19)
2014–	Dorog	26	(6)

International career
2005–2006	Hungary	1	(0)
- * Club domestic league appearances and goals as of 5 August 2015

Illés Zsolt Sitku (born 5 February 1978) is a Hungarian football player. He currently plays striker for Pálhalma SE.
