= Ákos Koller =

Romanian-born Hungarian footballer

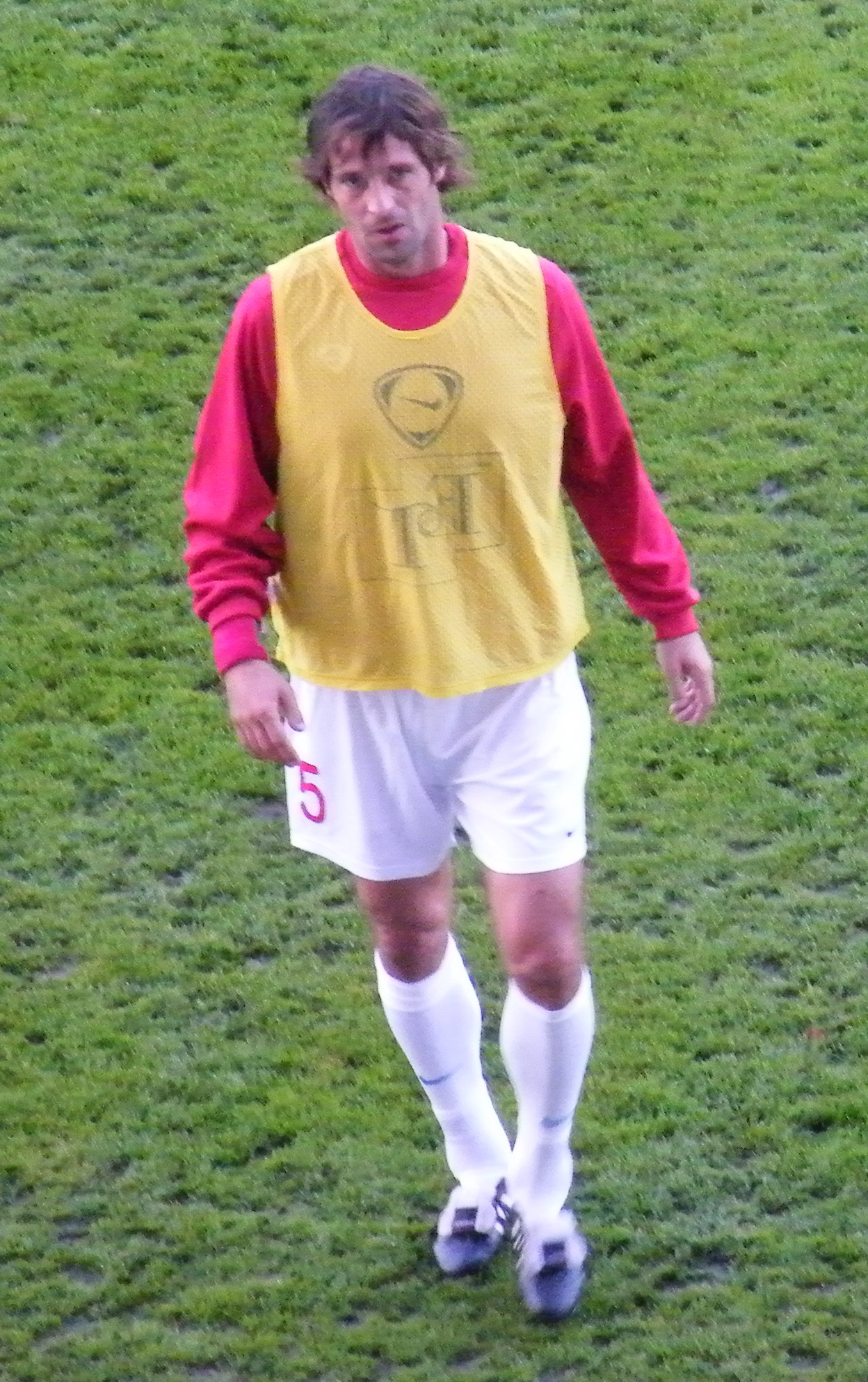

Personal information
- Full name: Ákos Koller
- Date of birth: 4 September 1974 (age 52)
- Place of birth: Baia Mare, Romania
- Height: 1.88 m (6 ft 2 in)
- Position: Defender

Senior career*
Years	Team	Apps	(Gls)
1993–1996	Ferencvárosi TC	0	(0)
1994–1995	→ FC Csákvár (loan)	10	(2)
1996–1999	Szombathelyi Haladás	49	(2)
1999–2000	Százhalombattai LK	10	(0)
2000	Vác-Újbuda LTC	11	(2)
2000–2001	Budaörsi SC	?	(?)
2001–2002	Csepel SC	26	(6)
2002–2003	BFC Siófok	29	(3)
2003–2009	Videoton FC	125	(11)
2009–2010	Kecskeméti TE	11	(1)
2010	Dunaharaszti MTK	12	(2)
2010–2011	Solymári SC	13	(2)
2011	Százhalombattai LK	12	(1)
2011–2012	Pilisvörösvár	14	(1)
2012–2014	Diósdi TC	27	(2)

International career
2005–2006	Hungary	2	(0)
- * Club domestic league appearances and goals as of 5 August 2015

Ákos Koller (born 4 September 1974 in Baia Mare, Romania) is a Romanian-born Hungarian former football player. His uncle, Alexandru Koller was also a footballer.
