= Balázs Farkas (footballer, born 1979) =

Hungarian footballer

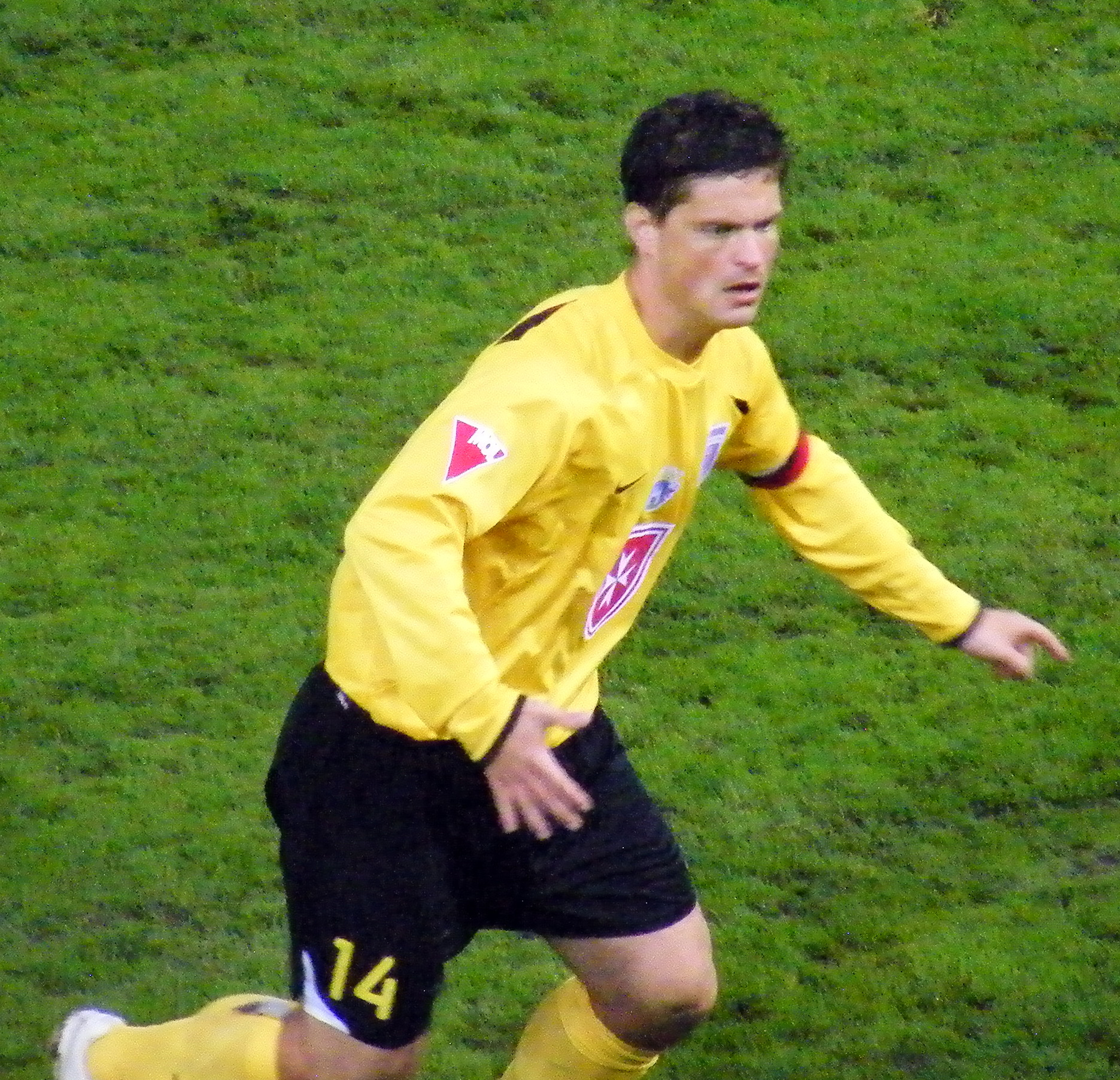

Personal information
- Full name: Balázs Farkas
- Date of birth: 15 October 1979 (age 47)
- Place of birth: Győr, Hungary
- Height: 1.78 m (5 ft 10 in)
- Position: Midfielder

Team information
- Current team: Mezőkövesd
- Number: 14

Senior career*
Years	Team	Apps	(Gls)
1996–1998	Győr	13	(0)
1998–1999	Sopron	25	(4)
1999	→ Mosonmagyaróvári TE (loan)	11	(2)
1999–2000	Mosonmagyaróvári TE	26	(2)
2000–2002	Győr	61	(7)
2002–2005	Újpest	88	(5)
2005–2011	Videoton	151	(12)
2011–2012	Vasas	18	(0)
2012–2013	Kecskemét	4	(0)
2013–	Mezőkövesd	31	(0)

International career
1996–1997	Hungary U17	3	(2)
1996–1997	Hungary U18	9	(2)
2003–2004	Hungary	4	(0)
- * Club domestic league appearances and goals as of 20 April 2014

Balázs Farkas (born 15 October 1979 in Győr) is a Hungarian football player who currently plays for Kecskeméti TE.
