= Zsolt Fehér (footballer, born 1985) =

Hungarian footballer

Personal information
- Full name: Zsolt Fehér
- Date of birth: 13 September 1985 (age 41)
- Place of birth: Székesfehérvár, Hungary
- Height: 1.90 m (6 ft 3 in)
- Position: Defender

Team information
- Current team: Tiszafüred VSE

Youth career
- 2002–2004: Videoton

Senior career*
Years	Team	Apps	(Gls)
2005–2009	Videoton	41	(1)
2008–2009	→ Pápa (loan)	7	(0)
2009	Tatabánya	14	(1)
2009–2015	Siófok	108	(5)
2015–2017	Békéscsaba	45	(0)
2017–2018	→ Siófok (loan)	30	(0)
2018–2019	Siófok	28	(1)
2019–	Tiszafüred VSE	10	(1)
- * Club domestic league appearances and goals as of 19:18, 3 January 2020 (UTC)

Zsolt Fehér (born 13 September 1985 in Székesfehérvár) is a Hungarian football player who currently plays for Tiszafüred VSE.
