= Jusuf Dajić =

Bosnia and Herzegovina footballer (born 1984)

Personal information
- Date of birth: 21 August 1984 (age 42)
- Place of birth: Doboj, SFR Yugoslavia
- Height: 1.80 m (5 ft 11 in)
- Position: Forward

Team information
- Current team: Pajde Möhlin (staff)

Youth career
- TSV Asendorf
- 1998–2003: Zvijezda Gradačac

Senior career*
Years	Team	Apps	(Gls)
2003–2004	Slavonija	13	(9)
2004–2005	Kamen Ingrad	25	(4)
2006–2008	Videoton	59	(14)
2008–2009	Jeonbuk	10	(4)
2009	Tubize	10	(1)
2009–2010	Šibenik	17	(2)
2010	Sloboda Tuzla	14	(2)
2011	Shanghai	8	(0)
2011–2012	Vasas	25	(5)
2012–2014	Siófok	45	(12)
2015–2017	Pajde Möhlin	7	(0)
2019	Pajde Möhlin	1	(0)

International career
2008	Bosnia and Herzegovina	1	(0)
	Bosnia and Herzegovina U21	11	(1)
- * Club domestic league appearances and goals

Jusuf Dajić (born 21 August 1984) is a Bosnian-Herzegovinian former professional footballer who played as a forward.

== Club career ==
Dajić played among others for the AFC Tubize in Belgian First Division, the HNK Šibenik in the Prva HNL and Shanghai East Asia in the China League One.

In the summer 2015, Dajić joined Swiss club NK Pajde Möhlin. He retired in summer 2017 but remained at the club as a part of the club's first team staff. In September 2019, he made his return to the pitch, playing a game for the club against FC Grenchen 15.

== International career ==
Dajić made his debut for Bosnia and Herzegovina in a June 2008 friendly match against Azerbaijan and it remained his sole international appearance.
