= Norbert Lattenstein =

Hungarian footballer

Personal information
- Full name: Norbert Lattenstein
- Date of birth: 13 February 1984 (age 42)
- Place of birth: Székesfehérvár, Hungary
- Height: 1.67 m (5 ft 5 1/2 in)
- Position: Midfielder

Team information
- Current team: Ajka
- Number: 10

Youth career
- 2002–2004: Videoton
- 2003–2004: → Mór (loan)

Senior career*
Years	Team	Apps	(Gls)
2004–2009	Videoton	79	(6)
2009	→ Felcsút (loan)	12	(0)
2009–2011	Haladás	30	(4)
2011–2012	Siófok	11	(1)
2012–2013	Budaörs	39	(11)
2013–	Ajka	51	(8)
- * Club domestic league appearances and goals as of 20 August 2015

Norbert Lattenstein (born 13 February 1984 in Székesfehérvár) is a Hungarian footballer. His current club is FC Ajka.
