= Dániel Nagy (footballer, born 1984) =

Hungarian footballer

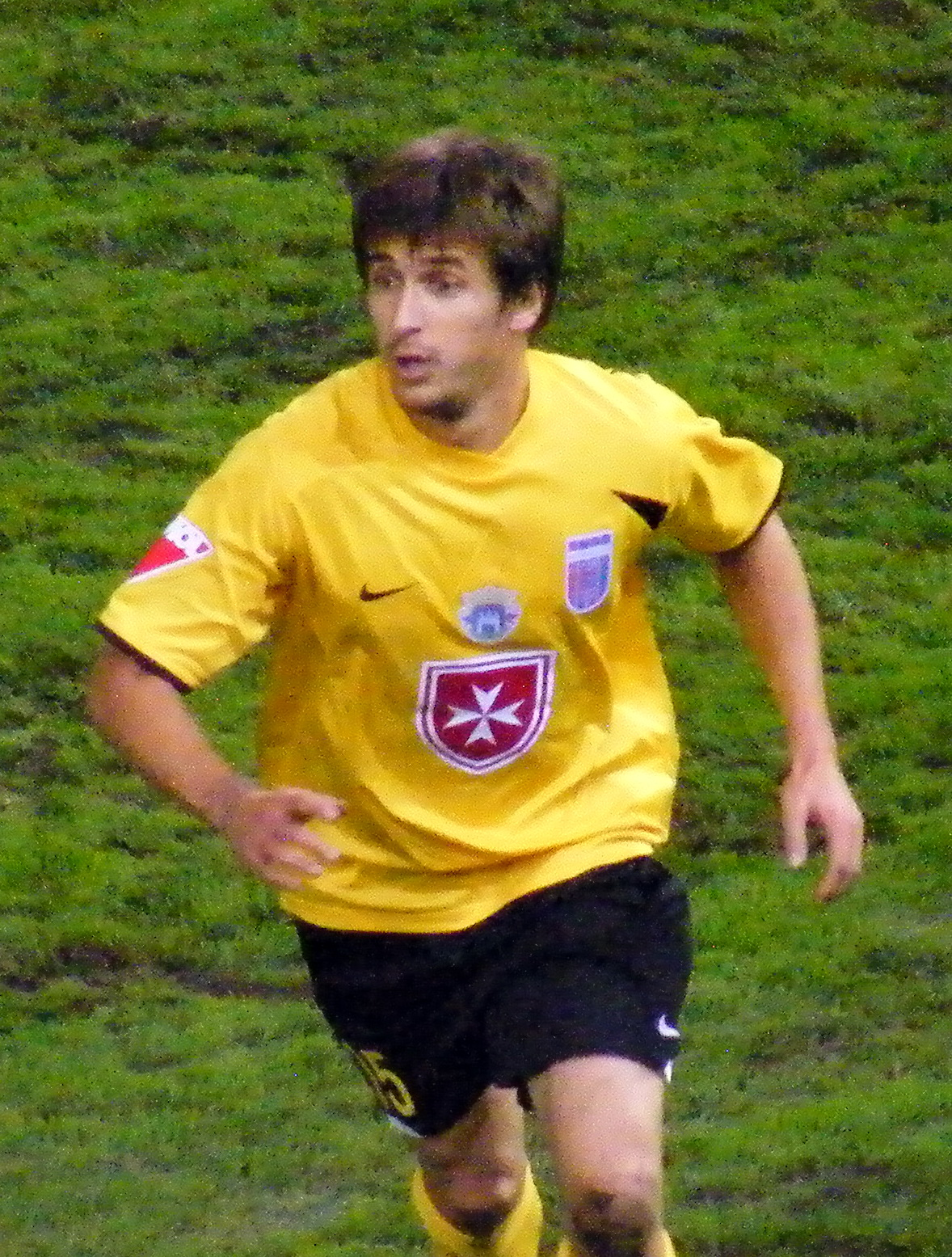

Personal information
- Date of birth: 22 November 1984 (age 41)
- Place of birth: Székesfehérvár, Hungary
- Height: 1.82 m (5 ft 11 1/2 in)
- Position: Right winger

Senior career*
Years	Team	Apps	(Gls)
2003–2013	Videoton	149	(14)
2012	→ Haladás (loan)	20	(3)
2013	→ Puskás (loan)	9	(0)
2013–2014	Siófok	23	(1)
2014–2015	Vasas	17	(0)
2015–2019	Siófok	98	(13)
- * Club domestic league appearances and goals as of 12:21, 24 May 2019 (UTC)

Dániel Nagy (born 22 November 1984) is a Hungarian football player who most recently played for BFC Siófok. He is notable for a goal against Újpesti TE, when he made a 70-meter run on the right wing, and scored.
