= 2006–07 Dunakanyar-Vác FC season =

Dunakanyar-Vác
2006–07 season
- Manager: Károly Gergely (until 2 March 2007); Tibor Nagy (caretaker, from 2 March 2007)
- Stadium: Ligeti Stadion
- Nemzeti Bajnokság I: 16th (relegated)
- Magyar Kupa: Round of 16
- Top goalscorer: League: Norbert Palásthy (7); All: Norbert Palásthy (8)
- Highest home attendance: 2,000 (multiple Nemzeti Bajnokság I matches)
- Lowest home attendance: 500 (multiple competitive matches)
- Average home league attendance: 1,420
- Biggest win: 5–0 v Karcag (Away, 1 November 2006, Magyar Kupa)
- Biggest defeat: 0–6 v Honvéd (Away, 3 March 2007, Nemzeti Bajnokság I)

The 2006–07 season was Dunakanyar-Vác Football Club's 14th competitive season, 94th year in existence as a football club and first season in the Nemzeti Bajnokság I after winning the East group of the second division in the previous season. In addition to the domestic league, Dunakanyar-Vác participated in that season's editions of the Magyar Kupa.

== Squad ==
Squad at end of season

Note: Flags indicate national team as defined under FIFA eligibility rules; some limited exceptions apply. Players may hold more than one non-FIFA nationality.

No.	Pos.	Nation	Player
1	GK	(Hungary) HUN	László Köteles
3	FW	(Hungary) HUN	Norbert Palásthy
4	DF	(Hungary) HUN	Ádám Hajzer
6	DF	(Hungary) HUN	Tamás Udvari
7	FW	(Hungary) HUN	István Csopaki
8	MF	(Hungary) HUN	Péter Farkas
9	MF	(Hungary) HUN	Gábor Vén
10	FW	(Hungary) HUN	Tamás Kulcsár
11	MF	(Hungary) HUN	Gergely Rusvay
12	GK	(Slovakia) SVK	Norbert Fedor
13	MF	(Hungary) HUN	Péter Kovács

No.	Pos.	Nation	Player
14	FW	(Hungary) HUN	Viktor Szabó
15	DF	(Hungary) HUN	Máté Dudás
16	MF	(Hungary) HUN	Gábor Gulyás
17	DF	(Hungary) HUN	Dániel Lettrich
18	FW	(Hungary) HUN	György Nikischer
19	DF	(Hungary) HUN	László Makrai
20	DF	(Hungary) HUN	Endre Gáspár
21	MF	(Hungary) HUN	Zsolt Lázár
22	FW	(Hungary) HUN	Balázs Bozori
23	GK	(Hungary) HUN	Máté Kiss

== Transfers ==
=== Transfers in ===
Transfer window	Pos.	No.	Player	From
Summer	—	—	(Hungary) Dávid Andrejcsik	Aszód
Summer	—	—	(Hungary) Levente Boda	(Hungary) Váci Reménység
Summer	—	—	(Hungary) András Sóti	(Hungary) Ferencváros
Summer	DF	2	(Hungary) Tamás Páles	(Hungary) Szolnok
Summer	DF	5	(Slovakia) František Kunzo	(Slovakia) Dukla Banská Bystrica
Summer	MF	9	(Hungary) Gábor Vén	(Hungary) Mosonmagyaróvár
Summer	FW	10	(Hungary) Tamás Kulcsár	(Hungary) Bőcs
Summer	GK	12	(Slovakia) Norbert Fedor	(Slovakia) Dukla Banská Bystrica
Summer	MF	16	(Slovakia) Martin Svintek	(Slovakia) Dukla Banská Bystrica
Summer	GK	23	(Hungary) István Hámori	Free agent (Note: Previous club Lahti.)
Autumn	DF	27	(Hungary) Richárd Balogh	(Spain) L'Hospitalet
Winter	MF	2	(Brazil) Geovanni	(Brazil) Brusque
Winter	MF	5	(Brazil) Marcelo Dluzniewski	(Brazil) Brusque
Winter	FW	7	(Hungary) István Csopaki	(Hungary) Rákospalota
Winter	MF	16	(Hungary) Gábor Gulyás	(Hungary) Tatabánya
Winter	DF	17	(Hungary) Dániel Lettrich	(Hungary) Újpest
Winter	MF	21	(Hungary) Zsolt Lázár	(Hungary) Honvéd
Winter	FW	22	(Hungary) Balázs Bozori	(Hungary) Rákospalota
Winter	—	25	(Serbia) Boris Jovanovic	(Serbia) Aluminijum Niš
Winter	MF	26	(Brazil) Prado	(Brazil) Madureira
Winter	FW	28	(Brazil) Leo	(Brazil) Brusque
Winter	GK	29	(Serbia) Dušan Đokić	(Serbia) Radnički Niš
Winter	MF	30	(Brazil) Diego	(Brazil) Brusque
Winter	MF	31	(Brazil) Cristiano Thomas	(Brazil) Brusque

=== Transfers out ===
Transfer window	Pos.	No.	Player	To
Summer	MF	—	(Hungary) Zoltán Bánföldi	(Hungary) Veresegyház
Summer	—	—	(Hungary) Gergő Csitári	(Hungary) Budapest Erőmű
Summer	MF	—	(Hungary) Gábor Gulyás	(Hungary) Tatabánya
Summer	GK	—	(Hungary) Szabolcs Kiss	(Hungary) Koroncó
Summer	DF	—	(Hungary) Roland Koszora	(Germany) Vilzing
Summer	MF	—	(Hungary) Tamás Kőrösi	(Germany) Passau
Summer	MF	—	(Hungary) Tamás Nagy	(Hungary) Vasas
Winter	—	—	(Hungary) Norbert Miklián	(Hungary) Balassagyarmat
Winter	—	—	(Hungary) Gábor Rozinka	(Hungary) Dunakeszi
Winter	DF	2	(Hungary) Tamás Páles	(Hungary) Integrál-DAC
Winter	DF	5	(Slovakia) František Kunzo	(Austria) Kottingbrunn
Winter	FW	7	(Hungary) Kornél Rob	(Hungary) Kisnémedi
Winter	MF	16	(Slovakia) Martin Svintek	(Slovakia) Podbrezová
Winter	MF	17	(Hungary) Balázs Sinkó	(Hungary) Jászberény
Winter	MF	22	(Hungary) Attila Laskai	Released
Winter	DF	24	(Hungary) Levente Babó	(Hungary) Dabas

=== Loans in ===
Transfer window	Pos.	No.	Player	From	End date
Summer	—	—	(Hungary) Zoltán Bereczki	(Hungary) MTK	End of season
Summer	MF	—	(Hungary) Balázs Kovács	(Hungary) Újpest	End of season
Summer	DF	4	(Hungary) Ádám Hajzer	(Hungary) Újpest	End of season
Summer	MF	21	(Hungary) Tibor Gábor	(Hungary) MTK	Middle of season

=== Loans out ===
Transfer window	Pos.	No.	Player	To	End date

== Competitions ==
=== Overview ===
Competition	First match	Last match	Starting round	Final position	Record							
Competition	First match	Last match	Starting round	Final position	Pld	W	D	L	GF	GA	GD	Win %
Nemzeti Bajnokság I	28 July 2006	26 May 2007	Matchday 1	16th	30	4	7	19	21	57	−36	13.33
Magyar Kupa	20 September 2006	22 November 2006	Third round	Round of 16	4	2	1	1	8	3	+5	50.00
Total					34	6	8	20	29	60	−31	17.65

Source: Competitions

=== Nemzeti Bajnokság I ===
==== League table ====
Pos	Team	Pld	W	D	L	GF	GA	GD	Pts	Qualification or relegation
12	Tatabánya	30	11	3	16	46	58	−12	36	
13	Győr	30	9	8	13	37	43	−6	35	
14	Rákospalota	30	9	7	14	42	55	−13	34	
15	Pécs (R)	30	7	12	11	31	41	−10	33	Relegation to Nemzeti Bajnokság II
16	Dunakanyar-Vác (R)	30	4	7	19	21	57	−36	19	Relegation to Nemzeti Bajnokság II

Source: soccerway.com
(R) Relegated

==== Results summary ====
Overall								Home						Away					
Pld	W	D	L	GF	GA	GD	Pts	W	D	L	GF	GA	GD	W	D	L	GF	GA	GD
30	4	7	19	21	57	−36	19	3	3	9	14	25	−11	1	4	10	7	32	−25

Source: Hungarian Football Federation

==== Results by round ====
Round	1	2	3	4	5	6	7	8	9	10	11	12	13	14	15	16	17	18	19	20	21	22	23	24	25	26	27	28	29	30
Ground	H	A	H	H	A	H	A	H	A	H	A	H	A	H	A	A	H	A	A	H	A	H	A	H	A	H	A	H	A	H
Result	L	D	L	W	L	D	L	L	L	D	L	L	D	L	D	D	L	L	L	L	W	L	L	W	L	W	L	L	L	D
Position	15	14	15	11	15	15	15	15	15	15	15	16	16	16	16	16	16	16	16	16	16	16	16	16	16	16	16	16	16	16
Points	0	1	1	4	4	5	5	5	5	6	6	6	7	7	8	9	9	9	9	9	12	12	12	15	15	18	18	18	18	19

Source: Matches
A = Away; H = Home; W = Win; D = Draw; L = Loss

==== Matches ====
28 July 2006 1	Dunakanyar-Vác	0–2	Paks	Vác
19:00 CEST (UTC+2)	Dudás (yellow card) 29'; Gáspár (yellow card) 55'; Kulcsár (yellow card) 58'	Report	Buzás 13' (pen.); Tamási (yellow card) 20'; Molnár (yellow card) 23'; T. Kiss 40'	Stadium: Ligeti Stadion; Attendance: 1,500; Referee: Zoltán Iványi; Assistant referees: Tamás Márkus, Dr. Zsolt Varga; Fourth official: Ákos Telek

5 August 2006 2	Vasas	2–2	Dunakanyar-Vác	Budapest
20:00 CEST (UTC+2)	Kincses 17', 45'; Tóth (yellow card) 39'; Lázok (yellow card) 41'	Report	Kovács (yellow card) 45'; Palásthy 81', (yellow card) 85'; Gáspár 90+2'; Svintek (yellow card) 90+3'	Stadium: Illovszky Rudolf Stadion; Attendance: 4,000; Referee: Csaba Imre Sápi; Assistant referees: Gyula Ortó, Ferenc Székely; Fourth official: József Berger

19 August 2006 3	Dunakanyar-Vác	0–1	Kaposvár	Vác
19:00 CEST (UTC+2)	Palásthy (yellow card) 30'; P. Kovács (yellow card) 32'	Report	Zahorecz (yellow card) 19'; Szakály 47'; Grúz (yellow card) 50'	Stadium: Ligeti Stadion; Attendance: 1,500; Referee: Péter Solymosi; Assistant referees: Tibor Vámos, Zoltán Kis; Fourth official: Gábor Péter Kovács

26 August 2006 4	Dunakanyar-Vác	3–1	Honvéd	Vác
19:00 CEST (UTC+2)	Dudás (yellow card) 19'; Svintek (yellow card) 19', (goal) 90'; Sinkó (yellow card) 21'; Kovács (yellow card) 38'; Palásthy 39', (yellow card) 40'; Kulcsár 57'; Rusvay (yellow card) 74'; Laskai (yellow card) 80'; Farkas (yellow card) 88'	Report	Dobos 19'; Schindler (yellow card) 27'; Baranyai (yellow card) 70'; Angoua (yellow card) 82'	Stadium: Ligeti Stadion; Attendance: 1,800; Referee: Szabolcs Szilasi; Assistant referees: Imre Attila Nagy, Oszkár Lémon; Fourth official: J. Zoltán Kovács

11 September 2006 5	Debrecen	4–0	Dunakanyar-Vác	Debrecen
18:00 CEST (UTC+2)	Vukmir (yellow card) 18'; Brnović 22', 48'; Dzsudzsák 51'; T. Sándor (yellow card) 60'; Sidibe 90'	Report	Laskai (yellow card) 45'	Stadium: Oláh Gábor utcai Stadion; Attendance: 6,000; Referee: Ferenc Bede; Assistant referees: Tamás Márkus, Gyula Ortó; Fourth official: Péter Herbály

17 September 2006 6	Dunakanyar-Vác	2–2	Tatabánya	Vác
18:30 CEST (UTC+2)	Dudás (yellow card) 37'; Vámosi 50' (o.g.); Laskai 60'	Report	Kouemaha 9'; Gulyás (red card) 25'; Hajdú (yellow card) 45'; Dupai (yellow card) 66'; Vámosi (yellow card) 89'; Rajnay 90+2'	Stadium: Ligeti Stadion; Attendance: 2,000; Referee: Tamás Bognár; Assistant referees: Zoltán Kis, Attila Beidek; Fourth official: Tamás Bodac

23 September 2006 7	Fehérvár	1–0	Dunakanyar-Vác	Székesfehérvár
19:00 CEST (UTC+2)	Lattenstein 12', (yellow card) 16'	Report	P. Farkas (yellow card) 35'	Stadium: Sóstói Stadion; Attendance: 2,000; Referee: Sándor Andó-Szabó; Assistant referees: István Tóth, Dr. Zsolt Varga; Fourth official: Attila Hegedűs

30 September 2006 8	Dunakanyar-Vác	2–3	MTK	Vác
18:00 CEST (UTC+2)	Rob 11'; Kovács (yellow card) 57'; Gáspár (yellow card) 62'; Palásthy 80'	Report	Lipcsei (yellow card) 22'; Kanta 27'; Bori 58'; Rodenbücher 73'; Pintér (yellow card) 90+1'	Stadium: Ligeti Stadion; Attendance: 2,000; Referee: Károly Török; Assistant referees: Dr. Péter Kovács, Balázs Világi; Fourth official: Attila Lidi

14 October 2006 9	Diósgyőr	1–0	Dunakanyar-Vác	Miskolc
14:00 CEST (UTC+2)	Binder 29'; Sipeki (yellow card) 83'	Report	Kunzo (yellow card) 32'; Rusvay (yellow card) 53'	Stadium: Diósgyőri Stadion; Attendance: 3,000; Referee: Krisztián Pánczél; Assistant referees: Zoltán Tompos, Vencel Tóth II; Fourth official: János Takács

21 October 2006 10	Dunakanyar-Vác	0–0	Győr	Vác
18:00 CEST (UTC+2)	Svintek (yellow card) 16'; Sinkó (yellow card) 35' (yellow-red card) 49'; Rob (yellow card) 49'; Kunzo (yellow card) 68'; Udvari (yellow card) 83'	Report	Pákolicz (yellow card) 81'; Bajzát (yellow card) 90+1'	Stadium: Ligeti Stadion; Attendance: 2,000; Referee: József Berger; Assistant referees: Tamás Márkus, Attila Forgács; Fourth official: László Varga

28 October 2006 11	Újpest	1–0	Dunakanyar-Vác	Budapest
18:00 CEST (UTC+2)	Z. Kovács 33'; Erős (yellow card) 51'; Böjte (yellow card) 63'	Report	Gáspár (yellow card) 14'; P. Kovács (yellow card) 20'; Kulcsár (yellow card) 73'; Gábor (yellow card) 89'	Stadium: Szusza Ferenc Stadion; Attendance: 2,500; Referee: Zoltán Iványi; Assistant referees: Attila Kelemen, Gyula Fehér; Fourth official: Attila Hegedűs

4 November 2006 12	Dunakanyar-Vác	0–1	Rákospalota	Vác
17:00 CET (UTC+1)	Udvari (yellow card) 76'; Kunzo (yellow card) 82'	Report	Bárányos (yellow card) 52'; Somorjai 64'; Polonkai (yellow card) 66'	Stadium: Ligeti Stadion; Attendance: 1,200; Referee: Viktor Kassai; Assistant referees: Gábor Erős, Tibor Vámos; Fourth official: Péter Pető

11 November 2006 13	Zalaegerszeg	1–1	Dunakanyar-Vác	Zalaegerszeg
17:00 CET (UTC+1)	Waltner 39', (yellow card) 90+1'; Nagy (yellow card) 51'	Report	Kovács (yellow card) 27'; Szabó (yellow card) 50'; Vén 56'; Farkas (yellow card) 73'	Stadium: ZTE Arena; Attendance: 6,000; Referee: Tamás Bognár; Assistant referees: Dr. Péter Szabó, Balázs Huszár; Fourth official: Krisztián Király

18 November 2006 14	Dunakanyar-Vác	1–2	Sopron	Vác
16:00 CET (UTC+1)	Kulcsár 40'; Dudás (yellow card) 63'; Páles (red card) 69'; Udvari (yellow card) 73'; Sinkó (yellow card) 90+2'	Report	Munteanu (yellow card) 22'; Sifter (yellow card) 49'; Feczesin 60'; Bagoly (red card) 68'; Demjén 74'	Stadium: Ligeti Stadion; Attendance: 1,000; Referee: Mihály Fábián; Assistant referees: Dr. Zsolt Varga, Gyula Ortó; Fourth official: Gergő Király

25 November 2006 15	Pécs	1–1	Dunakanyar-Vác	Pécs
16:00 CET (UTC+1)	Győri (yellow card) 54'; Pest (yellow card) 66'; Szabados 85'	Report	Vén 50'; Laskai (yellow card) 64'; Farkas (yellow card) 82'	Stadium: Stadion PMFC; Attendance: 1,500; Referee: Tamás Arany; Assistant referees: Zoltán Kis, Zsolt Márton; Fourth official: Péter Herbály

2 December 2006 16	Paks	0–0	Dunakanyar-Vác	Paks
13:30 CET (UTC+1)	Heffler (yellow card) 69'; Fehér (yellow card) 83'; Zováth (yellow card) 87'; Kóczián (yellow card) 90+3'	Report	Svintek (yellow card) 37'; Gáspár (yellow card) 55'; Dudás (yellow card) 62'	Stadium: Fehérvári úti Stadion; Attendance: 1,000; Referee: Zsolt Szabó; Assistant referees: Róbert Kispál, Zsolt Butkai; Fourth official: Miklós Demeter

11 December 2006 17	Dunakanyar-Vác	0–1	Vasas	Vác
18:00 CET (UTC+1)	P. Kovács (yellow card) 35'; Laskai (yellow card) 69'; Kunzo (yellow card) 73'	Report	Pandur 43'; Tóth (yellow card) 61'	Stadium: Ligeti Stadion; Attendance: 600; Referee: Sándor Gergely; Assistant referees: István Szécsényi, Szabolcs Deutsch; Fourth official: Norbert Kiss

24 February 2007 18	Kaposvár	3–0	Dunakanyar-Vác	Kaposvár
15:00 CET (UTC+1)	Oláh 22', 76'; Alves 31', (yellow card) 40'; Maróti (yellow card) 62'	Report	Palásthy (yellow card) 66'	Stadium: Rákóczi Stadion; Attendance: 2,500; Referee: Gyöngyi Gaál; Assistant referees: Zoltán Tompos, Zoltán Szalai; Fourth official: Gergely Sulyok

3 March 2007 19	Honvéd	6–0	Dunakanyar-Vác	Budapest
16:00 CET (UTC+1)	Ndjodo (yellow card) 21'; T. Szabó 39', 90'; Kovács 66' (o.g.); Dobos 72'; Hercegfalvi 74'; Bogdanović 76'	Report	Prado (yellow card) 13'; Makrai (yellow card) 23'	Stadium: Bozsik József Stadion; Attendance: 5,000; Referee: Krisztián Pánczél; Assistant referees: Tamás Márkus, Zoltán Pápai; Fourth official: J. Zoltán Kovács

10 March 2007 20	Dunakanyar-Vác	1–3	Debrecen	Vác
16:00 CET (UTC+1)	Kulcsár (yellow card) 26'; Makrai (yellow card) 75'; Palásthy 84'	Report	Sidibe 9', 45'; Stojkov 60'	Stadium: Ligeti Stadion; Attendance: 2,000; Referee: József Berger; Assistant referees: Zoltán Kis, Attila Beidek; Fourth official: József Erdős

17 March 2007 21	Tatabánya	1–2	Dunakanyar-Vác	Tatabánya
15:00 CET (UTC+1)	Filó (yellow card) 85'; Takács 90+2'	Report	Rusvay 34'; Palásthy 37'	Stadium: Városi Stadion; Attendance: 1,200; Referee: Csaba Imre Sápi; Assistant referees: Gyula Fehér, Tamás Raff; Fourth official: László Varga

31 March 2007 22	Dunakanyar-Vác	0–2	Fehérvár	Vác
16:00 CEST (UTC+2)	Kovács (yellow card) 28'; Lettrich (yellow card) 40'; Palásthy (yellow card) 67'; Gulyás (yellow card) 71'	Report	Mohl 15'; F. Horváth 37'; Koller (yellow card) 52' (yellow-red card) 68'	Stadium: Ligeti Stadion; Attendance: 1,500; Referee: Szabolcs Szilasi; Assistant referees: Attila Kelemen, Vencel Tóth II; Fourth official: József Erdős

8 April 2007 23	MTK	3–0	Dunakanyar-Vác	Budapest
15:00 CEST (UTC+2)	Pál 1'; Kanta 52', 58'	Report	Dudás (yellow card) 34'; Farkas (yellow card) 37'; Balogh (red card) 57'; Đokić (yellow card) 58'; Prado (yellow card) 73'	Stadium: Hidegkuti Nándor Stadion; Attendance: 1,500; Referee: Zoltán Iványi; Assistant referees: Zsolt Szpisják, István Albert; Fourth official: Péter Herbály

14 April 2007 24	Dunakanyar-Vác	1–0	Diósgyőr	Vác
17:00 CEST (UTC+2)	Makrai (yellow card) 11'; Thomas (red card) 27'; Rusvay 41'; Geovanni (yellow card) 66'; Gulyás (yellow card) 70'	Report	Hegedűs (yellow card) 4'; Sadjo (yellow card) 88'	Stadium: Ligeti Stadion; Attendance: 1,200; Referee: Gergely Sulyok; Assistant referees: Zoltán Tompos, Gábor Erős; Fourth official: Gábor Oláh

21 April 2007 25	Győr	1–0	Dunakanyar-Vác	Győr
17:00 CEST (UTC+2)	Bajzát 49'	Report	Marcelo (yellow card) 37'; Lázár (yellow card) 44'; Balogh (yellow card) 84'	Stadium: ETO Park; Attendance: 3,500; Referee: Sándor Gergely; Assistant referees: Szabolcs Deutsch, Balázs Farkas; Fourth official: Tibor Gyarmati II

27 April 2007 26	Dunakanyar-Vác	3–1	Újpest	Vác
19:00 CEST (UTC+2)	Vén 23', 61'; Bozori (yellow card) 44'; Dudás (yellow card) 47'; Rusvay (yellow card) 53'; Palásthy 90+2'	Report	Sándor (yellow card) 6'; Völgyi (yellow card) 9'; Böjte (red card) 23'; Tisza 41'; Balajcza (yellow card) 44'; Vaskó (yellow card) 60'	Stadium: Ligeti Stadion; Attendance: 2,000; Referee: István Vad; Assistant referees: Attila Kelemen, István Tóth; Fourth official: Gergő Király

5 May 2007 27	Rákospalota	4–0	Dunakanyar-Vác	Budapest
17:30 CEST (UTC+2)	Pusztai 28'; Torma 65' (pen.), 74'; Somorjai 71'	Report	Thomas (yellow card) 57'; P. Kovács (yellow card) 62' (yellow-red card) 69'	Stadium: Budai II. László Stadion; Attendance: 1,000; Referee: Sándor Andó-Szabó; Assistant referees: István Albert, János Medovarszki; Fourth official: Attila Hegedűs

12 May 2007 28	Dunakanyar-Vác	0–5	Zalaegerszeg	Vác
18:00 CEST (UTC+2)		Report	Waltner 17', 42', 88'; Ludánszki 85'; Máté 90+1'	Stadium: Ligeti Stadion; Attendance: 500; Referee: Tamás Bognár; Assistant referees: Dr. Péter Kovács, Imre Attila Nagy; Fourth official: József Erdős

19 May 2007 29	Sopron	3–1	Dunakanyar-Vác	Sopron
19:00 CEST (UTC+2)	Horváth 3'; Magasföldi 32'; Kolling 66'; Munteanu (yellow card) 82'	Report	Palásthy 36'	Stadium: Káposztás utcai Stadion; Attendance: 2,500; Referee: István Mészáros; Assistant referees: Gábor Takács, Zsolt Márton; Fourth official: József Erdős

26 May 2007 30	Dunakanyar-Vác	1–1	Pécs	Vác
18:00 CEST (UTC+2)	Farkas (yellow card) 26'; Palásthy (yellow card) 67'; Makrai (yellow card) 68'; Bozori 83'	Report	Pavičević (yellow card) 63'; Szabados (yellow card) 68'; Horváth 73'	Stadium: Ligeti Stadion; Attendance: 500; Referee: József Berger; Assistant referees: Zoltán Pápai, Dr. Zsolt Varga; Fourth official: Gábor Péter Kovács

=== Magyar Kupa ===
20 September 2006 Third round	Létavértes	0–1	Dunakanyar-Vác	Létavértes
15:30 CEST (UTC+2)		Report	Gáspár	Stadium: Létavértesi Sportcentrum; Attendance: 300; Referee: János Megyebíró

1 November 2006 Round of 32	Karcag	0–5	Dunakanyar-Vác	Karcag
12:30 CET (UTC+1)	Ramos (yellow card) 13'; Kocsis (yellow card) 30'; Bogdány (yellow card) 79'	Report	Palásthy 8', (yellow card) 63'; Kulcsár 19'; Gáspár 35'; Szabó 72', 85'	Stadium: Liget úti Sporttelep; Attendance: 250; Referee: Gergely Sulyok; Assistant referees: Zsolt Szpisják, István Albert

==== Round of 16 ====
8 November 2006 First leg	Vasas	2–1	Dunakanyar-Vác	Budapest
18:00 CET (UTC+1)	T. Nagy 37', (yellow card) 40'; Bali 51'; Fehér (yellow card) 63'	Report	Gáspár (yellow card) 17'; Szabó 25'; Sinkó (yellow card) 88'	Stadium: Illovszky Rudolf Stadion; Attendance: 500; Referee: Sándor Andó-Szabó; Assistant referees: Jozsef Heibl, Tibor Vígh

22 November 2006 Second leg	Dunakanyar-Vác	1–1 (2–3 agg.)	Vasas	Vác
18:00 CET (UTC+1)	Svintek (yellow card) 28'; Laskai 36'	Report	Pandur 27'; Kiss (yellow card) 74'	Stadium: Ligeti Stadion; Attendance: 500; Referee: Tamás Arany; Assistant referees: Ferenc Székely, Oszkár Lémon
Note: Vasas won 3–2 on aggregate.

== Statistics ==
=== Overall ===
Appearances (Apps) numbers are for appearances in competitive games only, including sub appearances.
Source: Competitions

No.	Player	Pos.	Nemzeti Bajnokság I				Magyar Kupa				Total			
No.	Player	Pos.	Apps	Goal	Booked	Sent off (straight red)	Apps	Goal	Booked	Sent off (straight red)	Apps	Goal	Booked	Sent off (straight red)
1	(Hungary) László Köteles	GK	22				3				25			
2	(Brazil) Geovanni	MF	5		1						5		1	
2	(Hungary) Tamás Páles	DF	3			1					3			1
3	(Hungary) Norbert Palásthy	FW	23	7	6		3	1	1		26	8	7	
4	(Hungary) Ádám Hajzer	DF	1								1			
5	(Brazil) Marcelo Dluzniewski	MF	4		1						4		1	
5	(Slovakia) František Kunzo	DF	11		4		2				13		4	
6	(Hungary) Tamás Udvari	DF	14		3		3				17		3	
7	(Hungary) István Csopaki	FW	7								7			
7	(Hungary) Kornél Rob	FW	9	1	1		1				10	1	1	
8	(Hungary) Péter Farkas	MF	18		6		2				20		6	
9	(Hungary) Gábor Vén	MF	29	4			4				33	4		
10	(Hungary) Tamás Kulcsár	FW	28	2	3		3	1			31	3	3	
11	(Hungary) Gergely Rusvay	MF	29	2	3		4				33	2	3	
12	(Slovakia) Norbert Fedor	GK					1				1			
13	(Hungary) Péter Kovács	MF	27		9	1	2				29		9	1
14	(Hungary) Viktor Szabó	FW	23		1		4	3			27	3	1	
15	(Hungary) Máté Dudás	DF	20		7		4				24		7	
16	(Hungary) Gábor Gulyás	MF	5		2						5		2	
16	(Slovakia) Martin Svintek	MF	15	1	4		3		1		18	1	5	
17	(Hungary) Dániel Lettrich	DF	5		1						5		1	
17	(Hungary) Balázs Sinkó	MF	9		3	1	3		1		12		4	1
18	(Hungary) György Nikischer	FW	1								1			
19	(Hungary) László Makrai	DF	24		4		3				27		4	
20	(Hungary) Endre Gáspár	DF	12	1	4		3	2	1		15	3	5	
21	(Hungary) Tibor Gábor	MF	3		1		3				6		1	
21	(Hungary) Zsolt Lázár	MF	8		1						8		1	
22	(Hungary) Balázs Bozori	FW	9	1	1						9	1	1	
22	(Hungary) Attila Laskai	MF	14	1	4		3	1			17	2	4	
23	(Hungary) István Hámori	GK	2								2			
23	(Hungary) Máté Kiss	GK												
24	(Hungary) Levente Babó	DF	1				1				2			
25	(Serbia) Boris Jovanovic	—												
26	(Brazil) Prado	MF	5		2						5		2	
27	(Hungary) Richárd Balogh	DF	9		1	1					9		1	1
28	(Brazil) Leo	FW	2								2			
29	(Serbia) Dušan Đokić	GK	6		1						6		1	
30	(Brazil) Diego	MF	2								2			
31	(Brazil) Cristiano Thomas	MF	10		1	1					10		1	1
Own goals				1								1		
Totals				21	75	5		8	4			29	79	5

=== Clean sheets ===
			Clean sheets		
No.	Player	Games Played	Nemzeti Bajnokság I	Magyar Kupa	Total
1	(Hungary) László Köteles	25	3	1	4
12	(Slovakia) Norbert Fedor	1		1	1
29	(Serbia) Dušan Đokić	6			
23	(Hungary) István Hámori	2			
23	(Hungary) Máté Kiss				
Totals			3	2	5
