= 2006–07 Győri ETO FC season =

Győr
2006–07 season
- Manager: János Pajkos (until 5 December 2006); István Reszeli Soós (caretaker, from 5 December 2006 to 1 January 2007); István Klement (from 1 January 2007)
- Stadium: Nádorvárosi Stadion (Note: Non-high risk matches were played at the Nádorvárosi Stadion in Győr, instead of their regular stadium, the Stadion ETO in Győr, which was demolished to make way for the newly built ETO Park.); Városi Stadion (Note: High risk matches were played at the Városi Stadion in Tatabánya, instead of their regular stadium, the Stadion ETO in Győr, which was demolished to make way for the newly built ETO Park.); Ménfői úti Stadion (Note: The matches against Zalaegerszeg and Pécs were played at the Ménfői úti Stadion in Gyirmót, a district of Győr, instead of their regular stadium, the Stadion ETO in Győr, which was demolished to make way for the newly built ETO Park.); (Temporary stadiums); ETO Park; (New stadium)
- Nemzeti Bajnokság I: 13th
- Magyar Kupa: Round of 16
- Top goalscorer: League: Péter Bajzát (18); All: Péter Bajzát (20)
- Highest home attendance: 4,400 v Vasas (7 April 2007, Nemzeti Bajnokság I)
- Lowest home attendance: 1,000 (multiple Nemzeti Bajnokság I matches)
- Average home league attendance: 2,673
- Biggest win: 7–2 v Koroncó (Away, 20 September 2006, Magyar Kupa)
- Biggest defeat: 0–5 v MTK (Away, 29 November 2006, Magyar Kupa)

The 2006–07 season was Győri Egyetértés Torna Osztály Futball Club's 61st competitive season, 48th consecutive season in the Nemzeti Bajnokság I and 101st season in existence as a football club. In addition to the domestic league, Győr participated in that season's editions of the Magyar Kupa.

== Squad ==
Squad at end of season

Note: Flags indicate national team as defined under FIFA eligibility rules; some limited exceptions apply. Players may hold more than one non-FIFA nationality.

No.	Pos.	Nation	Player
1	GK	HUN	Péter Molnár
2	DF	HUN	József Zsók
3	DF	HUN	Zoltán Kovács
4	DF	HUN	Szilárd Domanyik
5	MF	HUN	István Bank
6	DF	HUN	Róbert Varga
7	MF	HUN	Antal Jäkl
8	FW	MNE	Bojan Brnović
9	MF	HUN	Zsolt Müller
10	MF	HUN	Ottó Vincze
11	GK	SRB	Saša Stevanović
12	MF	HUN	András Gál
13	MF	HUN	Dávid Pákolicz

No.	Pos.	Nation	Player
14	MF	HUN	Dávid Lajtos
15	DF	HUN	József Rozsi
17	DF	HUN	János Mátyus
18	MF	HUN	Zoltán Böőr
19	FW	HUN	Péter Bajzát
20	MF	HUN	Tibor Nyári
21	MF	HUN	Ádám Dudás
22	GK	HUN	Csaba Somogyi
23	FW	HUN	Tibor Tokody
25	FW	HUN	Zsolt Szabó
28	MF	HUN	Zsolt Kiss
32	DF	HUN	Péter Stark

== Transfers ==
=== Transfers in ===
Transfer window	Pos.	No.	Player	From
Summer	—	—	(Hungary) Sándor Nyéki	(Hungary) Derecske
Summer	MF	—	(Hungary) Renátó Takács	(Hungary) Újpest
Summer	DF	3	(Hungary) Zoltán Kovács	(Hungary) Honvéd
Summer	MF	9	(Hungary) Zsolt Müller	(Hungary) Diósgyőr
Summer	FW	23	(Hungary) Tibor Tokody	(Germany) Wuppertaler
Winter	FW	—	(Hungary) Attila Sánta	(Hungary) BVSC
Winter	FW	8	(Montenegro) Bojan Brnović	(Hungary) Debrecen
Winter	MF	18	(Hungary) Zoltán Böőr	(Hungary) Debrecen

=== Transfers out ===
Transfer window	Pos.	No.	Player	To
Summer	DF	—	(Hungary) Krisztián Földes	(Hungary) Gyirmót
Autumn	FW	30	(Hungary) Tamás Priskin	(England) Watford
Winter	DF	8	(Hungary) Csaba Regedei	(Hungary) Rákospalota
Winter	MF	11	(Hungary) Zoltán Varga	Released (Note: Joined Pécs.)
Winter	DF	14	(Hungary) Viktor Hanák	(Hungary) Paks
Winter	MF	15	(Hungary) Péter Tóth	(Hungary) Haladás

=== Loans in ===
Transfer window	Pos.	No.	Player	From	End date
Summer	DF	22	(Hungary) Aladár Virág	(Hungary) Debrecen	Middle of season

=== Loans out ===
Transfer window	Pos.	No.	Player	To	End date
Summer	FW	—	(Hungary) Béla Mörtel	(Hungary) Integrál-DAC	Middle of season
Summer	DF	4	(Hungary) András Szabadfi	(Hungary) Integrál-DAC	Middle of season
Summer	MF	11	(Hungary) Zoltán Varga	(Hungary) Kaposvári	Middle of season
Summer	MF	13	(Hungary) Dávid Pákolicz	(Hungary) Integrál-DAC	Middle of season
Summer	MF	14	(Hungary) Dávid Lajtos	(Hungary) Integrál-DAC	Middle of season
Summer	DF	14	(Hungary) Oliver Pusztai	(Hungary) Rákospalota	End of season
Summer	DF	15	(Hungary) József Rozsi	(Hungary) Integrál-DAC	Middle of season
Summer	DF	21	(Hungary) Zsolt Makra	(Hungary) Rákospalota	End of season
Summer	MF	23	(Slovakia) Károly Czanik	(Hungary) Integrál-DAC	Middle of season
Summer	MF	28	(Hungary) Zsolt Kiss	(Hungary) Integrál-DAC	Middle of season
Winter	MF	—	(Hungary) Bence Gál	(Hungary) Mosonmagyaróvár	End of season
Winter	MF	—	(Hungary) Zoltán Nagy	(Hungary) Gyirmót	End of season
Winter	—	—	(Hungary) Henrik Rom	(Hungary) Tata	End of season
Winter	DF	4	(Hungary) Gábor Tóth	(Hungary) Mosonmagyaróvár	End of season
Winter	FW	16	(Hungary) Balázs Granát	(Hungary) Gyirmót	End of season
Winter	FW	18	(Hungary) Gábor Varga	(Hungary) Gyirmót	End of season

== Competitions ==
=== Overview ===
Competition	First match	Last match	Starting round	Final position	Record							
Competition	First match	Last match	Starting round	Final position	Pld	W	D	L	GF	GA	GD	Win %
Nemzeti Bajnokság I	29 July 2006	26 May 2007	Matchday 1	13th	30	9	8	13	37	43	−6	30.00
Magyar Kupa	20 September 2006	29 November 2006	Third round	Round of 16	4	2	0	2	11	10	+1	50.00
Total					34	11	8	15	48	53	−5	32.35

Source: Competitions

=== Nemzeti Bajnokság I ===
==== League table ====
Pos	Team	Pld	W	D	L	GF	GA	GD	Pts	Qualification or relegation
11	Paks	30	10	7	13	34	38	−4	37	
12	Tatabánya	30	11	3	16	46	58	−12	36	
13	Győr	30	9	8	13	37	43	−6	35	
14	Rákospalota	30	9	7	14	42	55	−13	34	
15	Pécs (R)	30	7	12	11	31	41	−10	33	Relegation to Nemzeti Bajnokság II

Source: soccerway.com
(R) Relegated

==== Results summary ====
Overall								Home						Away					
Pld	W	D	L	GF	GA	GD	Pts	W	D	L	GF	GA	GD	W	D	L	GF	GA	GD
30	9	8	13	37	43	−6	35	8	4	3	23	14	+9	1	4	10	14	29	−15

Source: Hungarian Football Federation

==== Results by round ====
Round	1	2	3	4	5	6	7	8	9	10	11	12	13	14	15	16	17	18	19	20	21	22	23	24	25	26	27	28	29	30
Ground	H	A	H	A	H	A	H	A	H	A	H	A	H	A	A	A	H	A	H	A	H	A	H	A	H	A	H	A	H	H
Result	W	L	D	D	W	D	W	L	W	D	D	L	W	L	L	L	L	L	W	W	D	D	L	L	W	L	D	L	L	W
Position	2	9	7	9	5	6	6	7	5	7	6	8	6	6	10	11	12	12	12	10	10	10	11	13	10	11	13	14	14	13
Points	3	3	4	5	8	9	12	12	15	16	17	17	20	20	20	20	20	20	23	26	27	28	28	28	31	31	32	32	32	35

Source: Matches
A = Away; H = Home; W = Win; D = Draw; L = Loss

==== Matches ====
29 July 2006 1	Győr	2–0	Honvéd	Győr
18:00 CEST (UTC+2)	Kovács (yellow card) 32'; Müller 60'; Vincze (yellow card) 78'; P. Tóth (yellow card) 79'; Bajzát 84'; Jäkl (yellow card) 90'	Report	Dobos (yellow card) 39'; Angoua (yellow card) 50'; Budovinszky (yellow card) 78'	Stadium: Nádorvárosi Stadion; Attendance: 2,000; Referee: Ferenc Bede; Assistant referees: Tibor Vámos, Zoltán Kovács; Fourth official: Krisztián Király

6 August 2006 2	Újpest	2–0	Győr	Budapest
17:30 CEST (UTC+2)	Vaskó (yellow card) 26'; Völgyi (yellow card) 62'; Z. Kovács I 83'; Cariati 90'	Report	Mátyus (yellow card) 19'; Z. Kovács II (yellow card) 33'; Vincze (yellow card) 51'; Bajzát (yellow card) 78'	Stadium: Szusza Ferenc Stadion; Attendance: 3,331; Referee: Zsolt Szabó; Assistant referees: Róbert Kispál, Dr. Péter Hegyi; Fourth official: Gábor Oláh

20 August 2006 3	Győr	2–2	Rákospalota	Győr
17:00 CEST (UTC+2)	Bajzát 40', 42'; Jäkl (yellow card) 61'; Tokody (yellow card) 71'; Mátyus (yellow card) 84'	Report	Torma 25', (yellow card) 77'; G. Nagy I (yellow card) 27'; G. Horváth (yellow card) 46'; Nyerges 57'; Török (yellow card) 71'; Makra (yellow card) 71'	Stadium: Nádorvárosi Stadion; Attendance: 4,000; Referee: Viktor Kassai; Assistant referees: Ferenc Székely, Gábor Erős; Fourth official: Krisztián Király

26 August 2006 4	Zalaegerszeg	2–2	Győr	Zalaegerszeg
19:00 CEST (UTC+2)	Nagy 44'; Ferenczi 81'; Máté (yellow card) 89'	Report	Vincze (yellow card) 18'; Zsók (yellow card) 27'; Bajzát 28', (red card) 32'; Jäkl (yellow card) 52'; Hanák (yellow card) 57'; Virág 61'; Stevanović (yellow card) 88'	Stadium: ZTE Arena; Attendance: 7,000; Referee: Károly Török; Assistant referees: Ferenc Székely, Zsolt Márton; Fourth official: Gergő Király

10 September 2006 5	Győr	2–0	Sopron	Tatabánya
16:30 CEST (UTC+2)	Z. Szabó 25'; Nyári (yellow card) 68', (goal) 90'; G. Varga (yellow card) 71'	Report	Trkulja (yellow card) 43'; Horváth (yellow card) 86'; Magasföldi (yellow card) 90+1'	Stadium: Városi Stadion; Attendance: 2,200; Referee: Sándor Gergely; Assistant referees: Szabolcs Deutsch, Zsolt Szalai; Fourth official: Nortbert Kiss

16 September 2006 6	Pécs	0–0	Győr	Pécs
19:00 CEST (UTC+2)	Sipos (yellow card) 39'; Kulcsár (yellow card) 56'	Report	Granát (yellow card) 5'; Mátyus (yellow card) 56'	Stadium: Stadion PMFC; Attendance: 1,500; Referee: Tamás Arany; Assistant referees: Zsolt Szpisják, János Medovarszki; Fourth official: J. Zoltán Kovács

23 September 2006 7	Győr	2–1	Paks	Győr
14:00 CEST (UTC+2)	Zsók (yellow card) 6'; Bajzát 62'; Tokody 72'; Hanák (yellow card) 80'	Report	Zováth (yellow card) 36'; Heffler 75'; L. Varga (yellow card) 86'	Stadium: Nádorvárosi Stadion; Attendance: 2,800; Referee: Sazbolcs Szilasi; Assistant referees: Ferenc Székely, Gábor Takács; Fourth official: Norbert Kiss

29 September 2006 8	Vasas	3–2	Győr	Budapest
19:00 CEST (UTC+2)	Kincses 26'; N. Németh 60', 90+3'	Report	Granát (yellow card) 34'; Bajzát 48', 66'; Müller (yellow card) 49' (yellow-red card) 90+2'; Szabó (yellow card) 65'	Stadium: Illovszky Rudolf Stadion; Attendance: 1,500; Referee: Sándor Andó-Szabó; Assistant referees: Zoltán Kis, Zoltán Szalai; Fourth official: Gergely Sulyok

14 October 2006 9	Győr	3–1	Kaposvár	Győr
15:00 CEST (UTC+2)	Mátyus 6'; Bajzát 15'; Dudás (yellow card) 35'; P. Tóth 65'; G. Varga (red card) 66'	Report	Vasiljević (yellow card) 32'; Kozmér (yellow card) 41'; Alves 67'; Venczel (yellow card) 79'	Stadium: Nádorvárosi Stadion; Attendance: 1,500; Referee: Tamás Bognár; Assistant referees: Dr. Péter Szabó, Balázs Huszár; Fourth official: Krisztián Király

21 October 2006 10	Dunakanyar-Vác	0–0	Győr	Vác
18:00 CEST (UTC+2)	Svintek (yellow card) 16'; Sinkó (yellow card) 35' (yellow-red card) 49'; Rob (yellow card) 49'; Kunzo (yellow card) 68'; Udvari (yellow card) 83'	Report	Pákolicz (yellow card) 81'; Bajzát (yellow card) 90+1'	Stadium: Ligeti Stadion; Attendance: 2,000; Referee: József Berger; Assistant referees: Tamás Márkus, Attila Forgács; Fourth official: László Varga

28 October 2006 11	Győr	0–0	Debrecen	Győr
15:00 CEST (UTC+2)	Z. Kovács II (yellow card) 62'	Report		Stadium: Nádorvárosi Stadion; Attendance: 2,500; Referee: Ferenc Bede; Assistant referees: Zoltán Szalai, Zoltán Kovács; Fourth official: Norbert Kiss

4 November 2006 12	Tatabánya	2–1	Győr	Tatabánya
13:30 CET (UTC+1)	Ndjodo (yellow card) 37', (goal) 38'; Bakrač (yellow card) 50'; Hajdú 90'	Report	Bajzát 67'; P. Tóth (yellow card) 71'; Müller (yellow card) 75'	Stadium: Városi Stadion; Attendance: 1,500; Referee: Sándor Gergely; Assistant referees: Gyula Ortó, Dr. Zsolt Varga; Fourth official: Gábor Oláh

11 November 2006 13	Győr	2–0	Fehérvár	Tatabánya
13:30 CET (UTC+1)	P. Tóth (yellow card) 39'; Tokody 58', 85'; Jäkl (yellow card) 77'	Report	Božić (yellow card) 62'; Csizmadia (yellow card) 70'	Stadium: Városi Stadion; Attendance: 1,000; Referee: Viktor Kassai; Assistant referees: Gábor Erős, Tibor Vámos; Fourth official: Csaba Pintér

20 November 2006 14	MTK	1–0	Győr	Budapest
18:00 CET (UTC+1)	Balogh 68'; Pollák (yellow card) 84'	Report	Kovács (yellow card) 38'; Dudás (yellow card) 84'; Z. Szabó (yellow card) 90+1'	Stadium: Hidegkuti Nándor Stadion; Attendance: 1,000; Referee: Péter Solymosi; Assistant referees: Jozsef Heibl, István Tóth; Fourth official: Gábor Oláh

25 November 2006 15	Diósgyőr	4–3	Győr	Miskolc
16:00 CET (UTC+1)	Elek 2'; Kéthévoama 22', (yellow card) 22'; Vitelki 51'; Abdou (yellow card) 60' (yellow-red card) 87'; Farkas 74', (yellow card) 74'	Report	Bajzát 16', 32', 57', (yellow card) 77'; Tokody (yellow card) 64'; P. Tóth (yellow card) 84'; Bank (yellow card) 90+1'	Stadium: Diósgyőri Stadion; Attendance: 4,500; Referee: Csaba Imre Sápi; Assistant referees: Zoltán Szalai, Tibor Vígh; Fourth official: Roland Veizer

2 December 2006 16	Honvéd	4–1	Győr	Budapest (Note: The match was played at the Béke téri Stadion in Budapest, instead of Honvéd regular stadium, the Bozsik József Stadion in Budapest, due to the renovation work.)
15:00 CET (UTC+1)	Dobos (yellow card) 1', (goal) 25'; Rigonato 15'; Disztl (yellow card) 27'; Baranyai (yellow card) 39', (goal) 45'; Hercegfalvi (yellow card) 56', (goal) 61'; Zana (yellow card) 65'	Report	Bank (yellow card) 38'; Tokody (yellow card) 54', (goal) 73'; Pákolicz (yellow card) 59'; Granát (yellow card) 76'	Stadium: Béke téri Stadion; Attendance: 300; Referee: Sándor Andó-Szabó; Assistant referees: Zsolt Szpisják, Attila Beidek; Fourth official: Attila Hegedűs

10 December 2006 17	Győr	0–3	Újpest	Győr
13:30 CET (UTC+1)	Kiss (yellow card) 43'; Hanák (yellow card) 52'; Regedei (yellow card) 54' (yellow-red card) 70'; Jäkl (yellow card) 73'	Report	Z. Kovács I 7'; Korcsmár 9', (yellow card) 40'; Mészáros 89'	Stadium: Nádorvárosi Stadion; Attendance: 1,000; Referee: István Vad; Assistant referees: Ferenc Székely, Balázs Huszár; Fourth official: Gergő Király

24 February 2007 18	Rákospalota	2–0	Győr	Budapest
14:00 CET (UTC+1)	Torma 7', 76'; Schrancz (yellow card) 42'; Sallai (yellow card) 88'	Report	R. Varga (yellow card) 68'; Bank (yellow card) 86'	Stadium: Budai II. László Stadion; Attendance: 700; Referee: Sándor Gergely; Assistant referees: Szabolcs Deutsch, Zsolt Szalai; Fourth official: Norbert Kiss

3 March 2007 19	Győr	2–1	Zalaegerszeg	Győr
15:00 CET (UTC+1)	Jäkl (yellow card) 12'; Kovács (yellow card) 15' (yellow-red card) 75'; Bajzát (yellow card) 24', (goal) 44'; Brnović 37'; Kiss (yellow card) 66'; Tokody (red card) 87'	Report	Kocsárdi (yellow card) 20'; Máté (yellow card) 26'; V. Sebők 76'; Dianu (yellow card) 81'	Stadium: Ménfői úti Stadion; Attendance: 2,500; Referee: István Vad; Assistant referees: György Ring, Zsolt Butkai; Fourth official: Gergő Király

10 March 2007 20	Sopron	0–1	Győr	Sopron
16:00 CET (UTC+1)		Report	Bajzát 82'	Stadium: Káposztás utcai Stadion; Attendance: 3,500; Referee: Tamás Arany; Assistant referees: Zoltán Tompos, Gábor Takács; Fourth official: J. Zoltán Kovács

18 March 2007 21	Győr	0–0	Pécs	Győr
15:00 CET (UTC+1)	Kovács (yellow card) 19'; Kiss (yellow card) 36'; Nyári (yellow card) 90'	Report		Stadium: Ménfői úti Stadion; Attendance: 2,200; Referee: Ferenc Bede; Assistant referees: Zoltán Szalai, Zoltán Kovács; Fourth official: J. Zoltán Kovács

31 March 2007 22	Paks	2–2	Győr	Paks
15:00 CEST (UTC+2)	Horváth 55', 86'; Molnár (yellow card) 61'; L. Varga (yellow card) 89'	Report	Brnović 15'; Bajzát (yellow card) 26'; Bank (yellow card) 50'; Stark 85'	Stadium: Fehérvári úti Stadion; Attendance: 2,000; Referee: Csaba Imre Sápi; Assistant referees: István Albert, Zsolt Szpisják; Fourth official: Attila Hegedűs

7 April 2007 23	Győr	0–2	Vasas	Győr
14:30 CEST (UTC+2)	Tokody (yellow card) 65'	Report	Kenesei 7'; Lázok 38'	Stadium: ETO Park; Attendance: 4,400; Referee: Szabolcs Szilasi; Assistant referees: Dr. Péter Szabó, Balázs Huszár; Fourth official: Krisztián Király

14 April 2007 24	Kaposvár	2–1	Győr	Kaposvár
17:00 CEST (UTC+2)	Oláh 47', 50'; Ribi (red card) 80'	Report	R. Varga 1'; Müller (yellow card) 33'; Dudás (yellow card) 36'; Jäkl (yellow card) 72'	Stadium: Rákóczi Stadion; Attendance: 3,000; Referee: Ferenc Bede; Assistant referees: Zoltán Szalai, Zoltán Kovács; Fourth official: Csaba Ursprung

21 April 2007 25	Győr	1–0	Dunakanyar-Vác	Győr
17:00 CEST (UTC+2)	Bajzát 49'	Report	Marcelo (yellow card) 37'; Lázár (yellow card) 44'; Balogh (yellow card) 84'	Stadium: ETO Park; Attendance: 3,500; Referee: Sándor Gergely; Assistant referees: Szabolcs Deutsch, Balázs Farkas; Fourth official: Tibor Gyarmati II

28 April 2007 26	Debrecen	3–0	Győr	Debrecen
18:00 CEST (UTC+2)	Stojkov 66' (pen.), 75', (yellow card) 66'; Komlósi 73'	Report	Pákolicz (yellow card) 59'; R. Varga (yellow card) 66'; Rozsi (yellow card) 77'	Stadium: Oláh Gábor utcai Stadion; Attendance: 8,000; Referee: Alexandru Deaconu (Romania); Assistant referees: Nicolae Maradin (Romania), Octavian Lovre (Romania); Fourth official: János Takács

5 May 2007 27	Győr	0–0	Tatabánya	Győr
17:30 CEST (UTC+2)	Kovács (yellow card) 13'; Bank (yellow card) 19'; Mátyus (yellow card) 86'	Report	Rajnay (yellow card) 75'	Stadium: ETO Park; Attendance: 3,000; Referee: Csaba Imre Sápi; Assistant referees: Zoltán Tompos, Péter Berettyán; Fourth official: Gábor Oláh

11 May 2007 28	Fehérvár	2–1	Győr	Székesfehérvár
19:00 CEST (UTC+2)	Božić 11'; Dajić (yellow card) 58'; Vayer 67'; Julinho (yellow card) 77'	Report	Rozsi (yellow card) 2'; Böőr (yellow card) 9'; Stark (red card) 66'; Mátyus (yellow card) 77'; Pákolicz 90'	Stadium: Sóstói Stadion; Attendance: 1,500; Referee: Zsolt Szabó; Assistant referees: Róbert Kispál, István Tóth; Fourth official: Gergő Király

22 May 2007 29	Győr	3–4	MTK	Győr
18:00 CEST (UTC+2)	Bajzát 19', (yellow card) 43'; Jäkl (yellow card) 35'; Mátyus (yellow card) 39'; Böőr 46', (yellow card) 46'; Szabó 74'	Report	Pintér (yellow card) 28'; Kanta 38'; Pátkai 53'; Urbán 76'; Pál 90+2'	Stadium: ETO Park; Attendance: 3,500; Referee: Péter Solmyosi; Assistant referees: Zoltán Kovács, Oszkár Lémon; Fourth official: Norbert Kiss

26 May 2007 30	Győr	4–0	Diósgyőr	Győr
18:00 CEST (UTC+2)	Brnović 20', (yellow card) 45'; Bajzát 22', 79'; Böőr 87'	Report	Sadjo (yellow card) 52'	Stadium: ETO Park; Attendance: 4,000; Referee: Tamás Arany; Assistant referees: Attila Forgács, Gábor Takács; Fourth official: Krisztián Király

=== Magyar Kupa ===
20 September 2006 Third round	Koroncó	2–7	Győr	Koroncó
15:30 CEST (UTC+2)	Makkos 2x	Report	Virág 2x; Szabó 2x; Bajzát 2x; Nyári	Stadium: Koroncói Sportpálya; Attendance: 500; Referee: Tamás Bognár

25 October 2006 Round of 32	Integrál-DAC	0–3	Győr	Győr
17:00 CEST (UTC+2)	Máté (yellow card) 58'; Császár (yellow card) 80'	Report	Tokody 9'; Regedei (yellow card) 34'; P. Tóth (yellow card) 47'; Virág 56', 79'; Mátyus (yellow card) 68'	Stadium: Nádorvárosi Stadion; Attendance: 2,200; Referee: Zsolt Szabó; Assistant referees: Tibor Vámos, Balázs Farkas

==== Round of 16 ====
8 November 2006 First leg	Győr	1–3	MTK	Győr
13:30 CET (UTC+1)	P. Tóth (yellow card) 36'; Tokody 80'	Report	Kanta 57', 59', 63'	Stadium: Nádorvárosi Stadion; Attendance: 2,200; Referee: Zoltán Iványi; Assistant referees: Á. Vári, János Medovarszki

29 November 2006 Second leg	MTK	5–0 (8–1 agg.)	Győr	Budapest
17:00 CET (UTC+1)	Kanta 12'; Czvitkovics 35', 83'; Pál 66', 85'	Report	Jäkl (yellow card) 24' (yellow-red card) 50'	Stadium: Hidegkuti Nándor Stadion; Attendance: 800; Referee: Krisztián Pánczél; Assistant referees: István Tóth, Balázs Farkas
Note: MTK won 8–1 on aggregate.

== Statistics ==
=== Overall ===
Appearances (Apps) numbers are for appearances in competitive games only, including sub appearances.
Source: Competitions

No.	Player	Pos.	Nemzeti Bajnokság I				Magyar Kupa				Total			
No.	Player	Pos.	Apps	Goal	Yellow card	Red card	Apps	Goal	Yellow card	Red card	Apps	Goal	Yellow card	Red card
1	(Hungary) Péter Molnár	GK												
2	(Hungary) József Zsók	DF	6		2		1				7		2	
3	(Hungary) Zoltán Kovács	DF	25		7	1	4				29		7	1
4	(Hungary) Szilárd Domanyik	DF												
4	(Hungary) András Szabadfi	DF												
4	(Hungary) Gábor Tóth	DF	1								1			
5	(Hungary) István Bank	MF	23		5		4				27		5	
6	(Hungary) Róbert Varga	DF	12	1	2		1				13	1	2	
7	(Hungary) Antal Jäkl	MF	26		8		4		1	1	30		9	1
8	(Montenegro) Bojan Brnović	FW	9	3	1						9	3	1	
8	(Hungary) Csaba Regedei	DF	11		1	1	3		1		14		2	1
9	(Hungary) Zsolt Müller	MF	28	1	3	1	4				32	1	3	1
10	(Hungary) Ottó Vincze	MF	4		3						4		3	
11	(Serbia) Saša Stevanović	GK	30		1		4				34		1	
12	(Hungary) Attila Dorogi	MF												
12	(Hungary) András Gál	MF	1								1			
13	(Hungary) Dávid Pákolicz	MF	20	1	3		3				23	1	3	
14	(Hungary) Viktor Hanák	DF	13		3		1				14		3	
14	(Hungary) Dávid Lajtos	MF	1								1			
15	(Hungary) József Rozsi	DF	9		2						9		2	
15	(Hungary) Péter Tóth	MF	14	1	4		4		2		18	1	6	
16	(Hungary) Imre Csermelyi	FW	2								2			
16	(Hungary) Balázs Granát	FW	11		3		1				12		3	
17	(Hungary) János Mátyus	DF	18	1	6		2		1		20	1	7	
18	(Hungary) Zoltán Böőr	MF	4	2	2						4	2	2	
18	(Hungary) Gábor Varga	FW	7		1	1	2				9		1	1
19	(Hungary) Péter Bajzát	FW	24	18	6	1	3	2			27	20	6	1
20	(Hungary) Tibor Nyári	MF	10	1	2		1	1			11	2	2	
21	(Hungary) Ádám Dudás	MF	14		3		1				15		3	
22	(Hungary) Árpád Lappints	MF												
22	(Hungary) Csaba Somogyi	GK												
22	(Hungary) Aladár Virág	DF	16	1			4	4			20	5		
23	(Slovakia) Károly Czanik	MF	7				2				9			
23	(Hungary) Tibor Tokody	FW	24	4	4	1	4	2			28	6	4	1
25	(Hungary) Zsolt Szabó	FW	23	2	2		3	2			26	4	2	
28	(Hungary) Zsolt Kiss	MF	8		3						8		3	
32	(Hungary) Péter Stark	DF	11	1		1					11	1		1
Own goals														
Totals				37	77	7		11	5	1		48	82	8

=== Hat-tricks ===
No.	Player	Against	Result	Date	Competition
19	(Hungary) Péter Bajzát	Diósgyőr (A)	4–3	25 November 2006	Nemzeti Bajnokság I

=== Clean sheets ===
			Clean sheets		
No.	Player	Games Played	Nemzeti Bajnokság I	Magyar Kupa	Total
11	(Serbia) Saša Stevanović	34	11	1	12
1	(Hungary) Péter Molnár				
22	(Hungary) Csaba Somogyi				
Totals			11	1	12
