= 2013–14 Paksi FC season =

Paks
2013–14 season
- Chairman: János Süli
- Manager: Ferenc Horváth (until 9 January); Aurél Csertői
- Nemzeti Bajnokság I: 11th
- Hungarian Cup: Round of 32
- Hungarian League Cup: Round of 16
- Top goalscorer: League: Attila Simon (18); All: Attila Simon (18)
- Highest home attendance: 3,500 vs Ferencváros (24 November 2013)
- Lowest home attendance: 100 vs Dunaújváros (16 October 2013)
Home colours	Away colours

The 2013–14 season was Paksi Football Club's 8th competitive season, 8th consecutive season in the OTP Bank Liga and 61st year in existence as a football club. In addition to the domestic league, Paks participated in this season's editions of the Hungarian Cup and Hungarian League Cup.

== First team squad ==
Note: Flags indicate national team as defined under FIFA eligibility rules; some limited exceptions apply. Players may hold more than one non-FIFA nationality.

No.	Pos.	Nation	Player
1	GK	SVK	Péter Molnár
5	MF	HUN	Bence Tóth
6	DF	HUN	Gábor Kovács
7	DF	HUN	Tamás Báló
8	MF	HUN	Tamás Kecskés
9	FW	HUN	Attila Simon
10	MF	HUN	Tamás Kiss
11	DF	HUN	Tibor Nyári
16	DF	HUN	Tibor Heffler
17	MF	HUN	Richárd Nagy
18	DF	HUN	Attila Fiola
20	FW	HUN	János Lázok
21	MF	HUN	Gábor Bori

No.	Pos.	Nation	Player
22	MF	HUN	József Windecker (loan from Győr)
23	MF	HUN	Olivér Nagy
24	GK	HUN	Norbert Csernyánszki
30	DF	HUN	János Szabó
33	DF	HUN	Gábor Horváth
39	FW	HUN	László Bartha
42	FW	HUN	Norbert Könyves
55	FW	HUN	Attila Tököli
63	DF	HUN	László Éger
77	MF	HUN	Dávid Kulcsár
87	FW	HUN	Gergely Délczeg (loan from Honvéd)
95	FW	HUN	Dávid Bor

== Transfers ==
=== Summer ===
In: Note: Flags indicate national team as defined under FIFA eligibility rules; some limited exceptions apply. Players may hold more than one non-FIFA nationality.

No.	Pos.	Nation	Player
1	GK	SVK	Péter Molnár (from Győr)
2	FW	HUN	István Nagy (loan return from Szolnok)
8	MF	HUN	Tamás Kecskés (from Siófok)
9	FW	HUN	Attila Simon (loan return from Pécs)
11	DF	HUN	Tibor Nyári (from Siófok)
14	FW	HUN	Szabolcs Csorba (from Nyíregyháza)
17	MF	HUN	Attila Hullám (from Kecskemét)
22	MF	HUN	József Windecker (loan from Győr)
23	MF	HUN	Olivér Nagy (from Pécs)
29	MF	HUN	Gábor Tamási (loan return from Szolnok)
33	DF	HUN	Gábor Horváth (from (Netherlands) Den Haag)
54	GK	HUN	Roland Máté (from Paks Academy)
87	FW	HUN	Gergely Délczeg (loan from Honvéd)
87	FW	HUN	Barnabás Vári (loan return from Szolnok)
—	FW	HUN	Dániel Tóth (from Orosháza)
—	MF	HUN	Roland Bohner (loan return from Szolnok)

Out: Note: Flags indicate national team as defined under FIFA eligibility rules; some limited exceptions apply. Players may hold more than one non-FIFA nationality.

No.	Pos.	Nation	Player
1	GK	HUN	Gábor Németh (to Vasas)
2	FW	HUN	István Nagy (loan to Szolnok)
6	DF	HUN	Tamás Sifter (to Sopron)
11	MF	HUN	Gábor Vayer (to Zalaegerszeg)
20	FW	HUN	János Lázok (loan to Győr)
23	GK	HUN	Máté Kiss (to Siófok)
25	FW	HUN	Márton Eppel (loan to MTK)
29	MF	HUN	Gábor Tamási (to Bölcske)
33	DF	HUN	József Zsók (loan to Baja)
87	FW	HUN	Barnabás Vári (loan to Szolnok)
89	FW	HUN	Roland Pap (to Kozármisleny)
92	MF	HUN	Norbert Pintér (to Balmazújváros)
95	FW	HUN	János Hahn (to Felcsút)
—	MF	HUN	Roland Bohner (loan to Szolnok)
—	FW	HUN	Dániel Tóth (loan to Balmazújváros)

=== Winter ===
In: Note: Flags indicate national team as defined under FIFA eligibility rules; some limited exceptions apply. Players may hold more than one non-FIFA nationality.

No.	Pos.	Nation	Player
5	MF	HUN	Bence Tóth (from Pápa)
—	FW	HUN	Dániel Tóth (loan return from Balmazújváros)

Out: Note: Flags indicate national team as defined under FIFA eligibility rules; some limited exceptions apply. Players may hold more than one non-FIFA nationality.

No.	Pos.	Nation	Player
14	FW	HUN	Szabolcs Csorba (loan to Nyíregyháza)
17	MF	HUN	Attila Hullám (to Tatabánya)
27	MF	HUN	Norbert Heffler (loan to Sopron)
—	FW	HUN	Dániel Tóth (loan to Kozármisleny)

- List of Hungarian football transfers summer 2013
- List of Hungarian football transfers winter 2013–14

== Statistics ==
=== Appearances and goals ===
Last updated on 1 June 2014.

No.	Pos	Nat	Player	Total		OTP Bank Liga		Hungarian Cup		League Cup	
No.	Pos	Nat	Player	Apps	Goals	Apps	Goals	Apps	Goals	Apps	Goals
1	GK	(Slovakia) SVK	Péter Molnár	27	-34	23	-28	0	0	4	-6
5	MF	(Hungary) HUN	Bence Tóth	7	0	6	0	0	0	1	0
6	DF	(Hungary) HUN	Gábor Kovács	20	1	17	1	0	0	3	0
7	DF	(Hungary) HUN	Tamás Báló	26	1	20	1	1	0	5	0
8	MF	(Hungary) HUN	Tamás Kecskés	33	2	28	0	1	0	4	2
9	FW	(Hungary) HUN	Attila Simon	31	18	28	18	1	0	2	0
10	MF	(Hungary) HUN	Tamás Kiss	25	2	16	0	1	0	8	2
11	DF	(Hungary) HUN	Tibor Nyári	11	1	4	0	1	0	6	1
16	DF	(Hungary) HUN	Tibor Heffler	24	4	17	3	1	0	6	1
17	MF	(Hungary) HUN	Richárd Nagy	2	0	1	0	0	0	1	0
18	DF	(Hungary) HUN	Attila Fiola	32	0	26	0	1	0	5	0
20	FW	(Hungary) HUN	János Lázok	10	1	8	0	0	0	2	1
21	MF	(Hungary) HUN	Gábor Bori	32	0	27	0	1	0	4	0
22	MF	(Hungary) HUN	József Windecker	24	2	22	2	1	0	1	0
23	MF	(Hungary) HUN	Olivér Nagy	17	1	10	1	1	0	6	0
24	GK	(Hungary) HUN	Norbert Csernyánszki	12	-21	7	-14	1	-2	4	-5
30	DF	(Hungary) HUN	János Szabó	33	2	26	1	0	0	7	1
33	DF	(Hungary) HUN	Gábor Horváth	18	1	14	0	1	0	3	1
39	FW	(Hungary) HUN	László Bartha	32	6	29	5	0	0	3	1
42	FW	(Hungary) HUN	Norbert Könyves	25	6	20	5	0	0	5	1
55	FW	(Hungary) HUN	Attila Tököli	19	1	13	0	0	0	6	1
63	DF	(Hungary) HUN	László Éger	23	0	21	0	0	0	2	0
77	MF	(Hungary) HUN	Dávid Kulcsár	4	0	3	0	0	0	1	0
87	FW	(Hungary) HUN	Gergely Délczeg	22	6	15	1	1	0	6	5
95	FW	(Hungary) HUN	Dávid Bor	3	0	1	0	0	0	2	0
Youth players:
17	MF	(Hungary) HUN	Tamás Szekszárdi	1	0	0	0	0	0	1	0
20	MF	(Hungary) HUN	József Kvanduk	1	0	0	0	0	0	1	0
95	MF	(Hungary) HUN	Patrik Bagó	1	0	0	0	0	0	1	0
Out to loan:
25	FW	(Hungary) HUN	Márton Eppel	3	0	3	0	0	0	0	0
27	MF	(Hungary) HUN	Norbert Heffler	6	0	2	0	0	0	4	0
88	FW	(Hungary) HUN	Szabolcs Csorba	3	0	0	0	0	0	3	0
Players no longer at the club:
17	MF	(Hungary) HUN	Attila Hullám	14	1	8	0	1	0	5	1

=== Top scorers ===
Includes all competitive matches. The list is sorted by shirt number when total goals are equal.

Last updated on 1 June 2014

Position	Nation	Number	Name	OTP Bank Liga	Hungarian Cup	League Cup	Total
1	(Hungary)	9	Attila Simon	18	0	0	18
2	(Hungary)	39	László Bartha	5	0	1	6
3	(Hungary)	42	Norbert Könyves	5	0	1	6
4	(Hungary)	87	Gergely Délczeg	1	0	5	6
5	(Hungary)	16	Tibor Heffler	3	0	1	4
6	(Hungary)	22	József Windecker	2	0	0	2
7	(Hungary)	30	János Szabó	1	0	1	2
8	(Hungary)	10	Tamás Kiss	0	0	2	2
9	(Hungary)	8	Tamás Kecskés	0	0	2	2
10	(Hungary)	7	Tamás Báló	1	0	0	1
11	(Hungary)	6	Gábor Kovács	1	0	0	1
12	(Hungary)	23	Olivér Nagy	1	0	0	1
13	(Hungary)	17	Attila Hullám	0	0	1	1
14	(Hungary)	55	Attila Tököli	0	0	1	1
15	(Hungary)	11	Tibor Nyári	0	0	1	1
16	(Hungary)	33	Gábor Horváth	0	0	1	1
17	(Hungary)	20	János Lázok	0	0	1	1
/	/	/	Own Goals	1	0	0	1
			TOTALS	39	0	18	57

=== Disciplinary record ===
Includes all competitive matches. Players with 1 card or more included only.

Last updated on 1 June 2014

Position	Nation	Number	Name	OTP Bank Liga		Hungarian Cup		League Cup		Total (Hu Total)	
Position	Nation	Number	Name	Booked	Sent off (straight red)	Booked	Sent off (straight red)	Booked	Sent off (straight red)	Booked	Sent off (straight red)
MF	(Hungary)	5	Bence Tóth	3	0	0	0	0	0	3 (3)	0 (0)
DF	(Hungary)	6	Gábor Kovács	3	0	0	0	0	0	3 (3)	0 (0)
DF	(Hungary)	7	Tamás Báló	2	0	0	0	0	1	2 (2)	1 (0)
MF	(Hungary)	8	Tamás Kecskés	8	0	0	0	1	0	9 (8)	0 (0)
FW	(Hungary)	9	Attila Simon	1	0	0	0	0	0	1 (1)	0 (0)
DF	(Hungary)	11	Tibor Nyári	2	0	0	0	0	0	2 (2)	0 (0)
DF	(Hungary)	16	Tibor Heffler	2	0	0	0	1	0	3 (2)	0 (0)
MF	(Hungary)	17	Attila Hullám	1	0	0	0	0	0	1 (1)	0 (0)
DF	(Hungary)	18	Attila Fiola	10	0	1	0	1	0	12 (10)	0 (0)
FW	(Hungary)	20	János Lázok	2	0	0	0	0	0	2 (2)	0 (0)
MF	(Hungary)	21	Gábor Bori	8	1	1	0	0	0	9 (8)	1 (1)
MF	(Hungary)	22	József Windecker	8	2	0	0	0	0	8 (8)	2 (2)
MF	(Hungary)	23	Olivér Nagy	0	0	0	0	1	0	1 (0)	0 (0)
MF	(Hungary)	27	Norbert Heffler	1	0	0	0	1	0	2 (1)	0 (0)
DF	(Hungary)	30	János Szabó	6	0	0	0	3	0	9 (6)	0 (0)
DF	(Hungary)	33	Gábor Horváth	4	0	1	0	0	0	5 (4)	0 (0)
FW	(Hungary)	39	László Bartha	6	0	0	0	0	0	6 (6)	0 (0)
FW	(Hungary)	42	Norbert Könyves	6	0	0	0	2	0	8 (6)	0 (0)
FW	(Hungary)	55	Attila Tököli	1	0	0	0	1	0	2 (1)	0 (0)
DF	(Hungary)	63	László Éger	6	1	0	0	0	0	6 (6)	1 (1)
MF	(Hungary)	77	Dávid Kulcsár	1	0	0	0	0	0	1 (1)	0 (0)
FW	(Hungary)	87	Gergely Délczeg	2	0	0	0	1	0	3 (2)	0 (0)
MF	(Hungary)	95	Patrik Bagó	0	0	0	0	1	0	1 (0)	0 (0)
			TOTALS	83	4	3	0	13	1	99 (83)	5 (4)

=== Overall ===
Games played	39 (30 OTP Bank Liga, 1 Hungarian Cup and 8 Hungarian League Cup)
Games won	12 (8 OTP Bank Liga, 0 Hungarian Cup and 4 Hungarian League Cup)
Games drawn	12 (10 OTP Bank Liga, 0 Hungarian Cup and 2 Hungarian League Cup)
Games lost	15 (12 OTP Bank Liga, 1 Hungarian Cup and 2 Hungarian League Cup)
Goals scored	57
Goals conceded	55
Goal difference	+2
Yellow cards	99
Red cards	5
Worst discipline	(Hungary) Attila Fiola (12 (yellow card) , 0 (red card) )
Worst discipline	(Hungary) József Windecker (8 (yellow card) , 2 (red card) )
Best result	4–0 (A) v Diósgyőr – OTP Bank Liga – 26-04-2014
Best result	4–0 (H) v Pápa – OTP Bank Liga – 17-05-2014
Worst result	1–4 (A) v Videoton – OTP Bank Liga – 18-08-2013
Most appearances	(Hungary) Tamás Kecskés (33 appearances)
Most appearances	(Hungary) János Szabó (33 appearances)
Top scorer	(Hungary) Attila Simon (18 goals)
Points	48/117 (41.03%)

Last updated: 1 June 2014

== Nemzeti Bajnokság I ==
=== Matches ===
27 July 2013 1	Újpest	1–2	Paks	Budapest, Pest County
16:30 CEST	Kabát 42' (pen.)	(Report)	Báló 60'; Simon 90+3' (pen.)	Stadium: Szusza Ferenc Stadium; Attendance: 1,613; Referee: (Hungary) Ádám Németh

2 August 2013 2	Paks	2–1	Pécs	Paks, Tolna County
19:00 CEST	Simon 19', 77'	(Report)	Koller 50' (pen.)	Stadium: Stadion PSE; Attendance: 1,200; Referee: (Hungary) Sándor Andó-Szabó

10 August 2013 3	Paks	4–1	Puskás	Paks, Tolna County
19:00 CEST	Kovács 6'; Simon 59', 72', 88'	(Report)	Tischler 54' (pen.)	Stadium: Stadion PSE; Attendance: 1,200; Referee: (Hungary) Péter Solymosi

18 August 2013 4	Videoton	4–1	Paks	Székesfehérvár, Fejér County
18:30 CEST	Nikolić 3', 8' (pen.); Juhász 65'; Gyurcsó 83'	(Report)	Könyves 90'	Stadium: Sóstói Stadion; Attendance: 3,600; Referee: (Hungary) Péter Solymosi

25 August 2013 5	Paks	1–1	Honvéd	Paks, Tolna County
18:30 CEST	Simon 28'	(Report)	Hidi 51'	Stadium: Stadion PSE; Attendance: 1,000; Referee: (Hungary) István Vad

31 August 2013 6	Győr	2–0	Paks	Győr, Győr-Moson-Sopron County
16:30 CEST	Andrić 21'; Szabó 40' (o.g.)	(Report)		Stadium: ETO Park; Attendance: 2,500; Referee: (Hungary) Mihály Fábián

13 September 2013 7	Paks	2–0	Kaposvár	Paks, Tolna County
19:00 CEST	Windecker 41'; Simon 78'	(Report)		Stadium: Stadion PSE; Attendance: 1,000; Referee: (Hungary) Ádám Farkas

21 September 2013 8	MTK	2–0	Paks	Budapest, Pest County
18:00 CEST	Kanta 47'; Pölöskei 88'	(Report)		Stadium: Hidegkuti Nándor Stadium; Attendance: 900; Referee: (Hungary) Tamás Bognár

27 September 2013 9	Paks	1–1	Mezőkövesd	Paks, Tolna County
19:00 CEST	Simon 38' (pen.)	(Report)	Harsányi 31'	Stadium: Stadion PSE; Attendance: 800; Referee: (Hungary) Viktor Kassai

4 October 2013 10	Debrecen	2–2	Paks	Debrecen, Hajdú-Bihar County
19:00 CEST	Sidibe 6'; Brković 79'	(Report)	Simon 10', 60' (pen.)	Stadium: Stadion Oláh Gábor Út; Attendance: 3,500; Referee: (Hungary) Ádám Farkas

19 October 2013 11	Paks	0–2	Diósgyőr	Paks, Tolna County
18:00 CEST		(Report)	Elek 34'; Barczi 62'	Stadium: Stadion PSE; Attendance: 2,500; Referee: (Hungary) István Vad

26 October 2013 12	Kecskemét	3–1	Paks	Kecskemét, Bács-Kiskun County
18:00 CEST	Gyagya 26'; Póti 33'; Vukasović 59'	(Report)	Nagy 7'	Stadium: Széktói Stadion; Attendance: 1,323; Referee: (Hungary) Ádám Németh

2 November 2013 13	Paks	0–1	Szombathely	Paks, Tolna County
20:00 CET		(Report)	Halmosi 77'	Stadium: Stadion PSE; Attendance: 500; Referee: (Hungary) Viktor Kassai

9 November 2013 14	Pápa	1–0	Paks	Pápa, Veszprém County
16:00 CET	Orosz 62'	(Report)		Stadium: Stadion Várkerti; Attendance: 800; Referee: (Hungary) Sándor Andó-Szabó

24 November 2013 15	Paks	2–2	Ferencváros	Paks, Tolna County
18:30 CET	Bartha 60'; Simon 64'	(Report)	Böde 43'; Jenner 65'	Stadium: Stadion PSE; Attendance: 3,500; Referee: (Hungary) Tamás Bognár

30 November 2013 16	Paks	2–4	Újpest	Paks, Tolna County
16:00 CET	Könyves 9'; Bartha 32'	(Report)	Tshibuabua 22'; Nego 56'; Vasiljević 60'; Lázár 65'	Stadium: Stadion PSE; Attendance: 1,500; Referee: (Hungary) Péter Solymosi

7 December 2013 17	Pécs	1–1	Paks	Pécs, Baranya County
16:00 CET	Mohl 61' (pen.)	(Report)	Simon 9'	Stadium: Stadion PMFC; Attendance: 800; Referee: (Hungary) Viktor Kassai

28 February 2014 18	Puskás	1–0	Paks	Székesfehérvár, Fejér County
19:00 CET	Tóth 80'	(Report)		Stadium: Sóstói Stadion; Attendance: 330; Referee: (Hungary) József Erdős

9 March 2014 19	Paks	2–2	Videoton	Paks, Tolna County
18:30 CET	Heffler 35'; Caneira 49' (o.g.)	(Report)	Haraszti 22'; Nikolić 78'	Stadium: Stadion PSE; Attendance: 1,000; Referee: (Hungary) Mihály Fábián

17 March 2014 20	Honvéd	1–1	Paks	Budapest, Pest County
19:00 CET	Daud 52' (pen.)	(Report)	Délczeg 42' (pen.)	Stadium: Bozsik Stadion; Attendance: 1,500; Referee: (Hungary) Ádám Németh

22 March 2014 21	Paks	1–2	Győr	Paks, Tolna County
20:00 CET	Bartha 20'	(Report)	Rudolf 12', 26'	Stadium: Stadion PSE; Attendance: 1,600; Referee: (Hungary) Péter Solymosi

29 March 2014 22	Kaposvár	0–0	Paks	Kaposvár, Somogy County
16:00 CET		(Report)		Stadium: Stadion Kaposvár Rákóczi; Attendance: 1,200; Referee: (Hungary) Mihály Fábián

5 April 2014 23	Paks	1–3	MTK	Paks, Tolna County
16:00 CEST	Heffler 67'	(Report)	Vass 16'; Torghelle 37', 60'	Stadium: Stadion PSE; Attendance: 700; Referee: (Hungary) Zoltán Iványi

12 April 2014 24	Mezőkövesd	2–2	Paks	Mezőkövesd, Borsod-Abaúj-Zemplén County
16:00 CEST	Bognár 4'; Menougong 29'	(Report)	Windecker 47'; Simon 50'	Stadium: Mezőkövesdi Városi Stadion; Attendance: 1,800; Referee: (Hungary) Ádám Farkas

19 April 2014 25	Paks	0–0	Debrecen	Paks, Tolna County
16:00 CEST		(Report)		Stadium: Stadion PSE; Attendance: 1,000; Referee: (Hungary) Zsolt Szabó

26 April 2014 26	Diósgyőr	0–4	Paks	Miskolc, Borsod-Abaúj-Zemplén County
20:00 CEST		(Report)	Szabó 30'; Bartha 34'; Simon 38' (pen.); Könyves 56'	Stadium: DVTK Stadion; Attendance: 3,935; Referee: (Hungary) Péter Solymosi

2 May 2014 27	Paks	2–0	Kecskemét	Paks, Tolna County
19:00 CEST	Könyves 9'; Simon 11'	(Report)		Stadium: Stadion PSE; Attendance: 1,000; Referee: (Hungary) Ádám Farkas

11 May 2014 28	Haladás	0–1	Paks	Szombathely, Vas County
18:30 CET		(Report)	Simon A. 23' (pen.)	Stadium: Rohonci Street Stadium; Attendance: 1,122; Referee: (Hungary) Zsolt Szabó

17 May 2014 29	Paks	4–0	Pápa	Paks, Tolna County
16:00 CEST	Könyves 39'; Bartha 49'; Simon 80'; Heffler 84'	(Report)		Stadium: Stadion PSE; Attendance: 1,000; Referee: (Hungary) István Vad

1 June 2014 30	Ferencváros	2–0	Paks	Budapest, Pest County
16:30 CEST	Bönig 54'; Leonardo 82' (pen.)	(Report)		Stadium: Ferenc Puskás Stadium; Attendance: 13,689; Referee: (Hungary) Zoltán Iványi

=== Classification ===
Pos	Team	Pld	W	D	L	GF	GA	GD	Pts
9	Honvéd	30	10	6	14	37	39	−2	36
10	Kecskemét	30	9	9	12	36	51	−15	36
11	Paks	30	8	10	12	39	42	−3	34
12	Pápa	30	9	6	15	32	50	−18	33
13	Újpest	30	8	8	14	46	51	−5	32

Source: mlsz.hu (in Hungarian)
Rules for classification: 1st points; 2nd overall wins; 3rd goal difference; 4th head-to-head points; 5th head-to-head goal difference; 6th head-to-head away goals scored; 7th fair-play points; 8th drawing of lots

=== Results summary ===
Overall								Home						Away					
Pld	W	D	L	GF	GA	GD	Pts	W	D	L	GF	GA	GD	W	D	L	GF	GA	GD
30	8	10	12	39	42	−3	34	5	5	5	24	20	+4	3	5	7	15	22	−7

Last updated: 1 June 2014.
Source: NB1

=== Results by round ===
Round	1	2	3	4	5	6	7	8	9	10	11	12	13	14	15	16	17	18	19	20	21	22	23	24	25	26	27	28	29	30
Ground	A	H	H	A	H	A	H	A	H	A	H	A	H	A	H	H	A	A	H	A	H	A	H	A	H	A	H	A	H	A
Result	W	W	W	L	D	L	W	L	D	D	L	L	L	L	D	L	D	L	D	D	L	D	L	D	D	W	W	W	W	L
Position	6	4	3	4	4	5	4	6	5	7	8	8	10	11	12	13	13	14	15	15	15	14	15	15	15	14	14	11	10	11

Updated to match(es) played on 1 June 2014. Source: Matches
A = Away; H = Home; W = Win; D = Draw; L = Loss

== Hungarian Cup ==
30 October 2013 Round of 32	Dunaújváros	2–0	Paks	Dunaújváros, Fejér County
12:30 CET	Böőr 11'; Burucz 68'	(Report)		Stadium: Dunaferr Arena; Attendance: 600; Referee: (Hungary) Norbert Kiss

== League Cup ==
=== Group stage ===
4 September 2013 1	Paks	4–2	Kozármisleny	Paks, Tolna County
17:00 CEST	Szabó 13'; Hullám 50' (pen.); Tököli 81'; Délczeg 90+1'	(Report)	Tóth 32'; Farkas 69'	Stadium: Stadion PSE; Attendance: 250; Referee: (Hungary) Norbert Kiss

10 September 2013 2	Paks	3–3	Videoton	Paks, Tolna County
16:30 CEST	Heffler 10'; Délczeg 20'; Kiss 44'	(Report)	Zé Luís 46'; Szolnoki 68'; Gyurcsó 90+1'	Stadium: Stadion PSE; Attendance: 400; Referee: (Hungary) Ferenc Karakó

9 October 2013 3	Dunaújváros	1–0	Paks	Dunaújváros, Fejér County
15:00 CEST	Perović 34'	(Report)		Stadium: Dunaferr Arena; Attendance: 400; Referee: (Hungary) Gábor Barna

16 October 2013 4	Paks	2–0	Dunaújváros	Paks, Tolna County
14:30 CEST	Kiss 22'; Nyári 47'	(Report)		Stadium: Stadion PSE; Attendance: 100; Referee: (Hungary) Szabolcs Szilasi

13 November 2013 5	Videoton	1–4	Paks	Székesfehérvár, Fejér County
17:00 CET	Zé Luís 67'	(Report)	Könyves 12'; Délczeg 15', 52'; Bartha 49'	Stadium: Sóstói Stadion; Attendance: 500; Referee: (Hungary) Ádám Radványi

20 November 2013 6	Kozármisleny	0–3	Paks	Kozármisleny, Baranya County
13:00 CET		(Report)	Délczeg 5'; Kecskés 57', 88'	Stadium: Stadium Alkotmány Square; Attendance: 100; Referee: (Hungary) Norbert Kiss

==== Classification ====
Pos	Team	Pld	W	D	L	GF	GA	GD	Pts	Qualification
1	Paks	6	4	1	1	16	7	+9	13	Advance to knockout phase
2	Videoton	6	3	1	2	15	9	+6	10	Advance to knockout phase
3	Kozármisleny	6	2	1	3	7	13	−6	7	
4	Dunaújváros	6	1	1	4	2	11	−9	4	

Rules for classification: 1) points; 2) goal difference; 3) number of goals scored.

=== Knockout phase ===
22 February 2014 Round of 16 (1st leg)	Pécs	1–1	Paks	Pécs, Baranya County
16:00 CET	Mohl 22'	(Report)	Horváth 41'	Stadium: Stadion PMFC; Attendance: 400; Referee: (Hungary) Szabolcs Szilasi

4 March 2014 Round of 16 (2nd leg)	Paks	1–3 (2–4 agg.)	Pécs	Paks, Tolna County
14:00 CET	Lázok 6'	(Report)	Perić 59' (pen.), 65', 67'	Stadium: Stadion PSE; Attendance: 500; Referee: (Hungary) József Berger

== Pre-season ==
28 June 2013 1	Kalocsa (Hungary)	0–5	(Hungary) Paksi SE	Kalocsa, Bács-Kiskun County
CEST		(Report)	Könyves 43'; Vayer 55' (pen.); Mészáros 65'; Juhász 72'; Pap 82'	Stadium: Városi Sporttelep

3 July 2013 2	Paksi SE (Hungary)	1–1	(Croatia) NK Osijek	Felcsút, Fejér County
CEST	Báló 76'	(Report)		Stadium: Városi Sporttelep

6 July 2013 3	Pécsi Mecsek FC (Hungary)	2–1	(Hungary) Paksi SE	Pécs, Baranya County
CEST	Wittrédi 24'; Koller 62' (pen.)	(Report)	Hullám 90'	Stadium: Stadion PMFC; Attendance: 300; Referee: (Hungary) János Botló

10 July 2013 4	BFC Siófok (Hungary)	1–2	(Hungary) Paksi SE	Siófok, Somogy County
CEST	Mosberger 52'	(Report)	Nyári 63'; Csorba 69'	Stadium: Révész Street Stadium

12 July 2013 5	Diósgyőri VTK (Hungary)	2–0	(Hungary) Paksi SE	Szombathely, Vas County
CEST	Rudolf (pen.); Kostić	(Report)		Stadium: Király Sportcentrum; Attendance: 500; Referee: (Hungary) Csaba Pintér

12 July 2013 6	Paksi SE (Hungary)	2–1	(Bosnia and Herzegovina) FK Slavija	Szombathely, Vas County
CEST	Simon; Nyári	(Report)		Stadium: Király Sportcentrum; Attendance: 500; Referee: (Hungary) Csaba Pintér

17 July 2013 7	Mezőkövesd-Zsóry SE (Hungary)	3–1	(Hungary) Paksi SE	Tata, Komárom-Esztergom County
CEST	Balajti 7'; Menougong 15'; Irhás 85'	(Report)	Nyári 47'	Attendance: 60; Referee: (Hungary) Balázs Berke

20 July 2013 8	Paksi SE (Hungary)	3–2	(Hungary) Kozármisleny SE	Paks, Tolna County
CEST	Heffler 9'; Simon 16'; Bartha 57'	(Report)	Varga 88' (pen.); Turi 90'	Stadium: Stadion PSE
