= Balázs Bozori =

Hungarian footballer (born 1982)

Personal information
- Date of birth: 1 September 1982 (age 44)
- Place of birth: Vác, Hungary
- Height: 1.84 m (6 ft 0 in)
- Position: Striker

Youth career
- –2001: Vác

Senior career*
Years	Team	Apps	(Gls)
2001–2004	Dunakanyar-Vác	72	(29)
2004–2006	Újpest	5	(0)
2006	→ Honvéd (loan)	10	(1)
2006–2007	Rákospalota	3	(0)
2007	Dunakanyar-Vác	9	(1)
2007–2008	Pécs	18	(3)
2008–2009	Szolnok	15	(2)
2009–2013	Vácrátót	84	(114)
2013–2015	Csomád	53	(51)
2015–2016	Cso-Ki Sport	18	(7)
Total		287	(208)
- * Club domestic league appearances and goals

Balázs Bozori (born 1 September 1982) is a Hungarian former professional footballer, who played as a striker.

== Career ==
In the winter transfer window of 2006, Bozori was loaned from Nemzeti Bajnokság I club Újpest to Honvéd for the second half of the season.

He subsequently joined Nemzeti Bajnokság I club Rákospalota for the 2006–07 season from Újpest, following the completion of his loan spell at Honvéd.

== Career statistics ==
Appearances and goals by club, season and competition
Club	Season	League			Magyar Kupa		Europe		Other		Total	
Club	Season	Division	Apps	Goals	Apps	Goals	Apps	Goals	Apps	Goals	Apps	Goals
Dunakanyar-Vác	2001–02	Nemzeti Bajnokság III	14	7	—		—		—		14	7
Dunakanyar-Vác	2002–03	Nemzeti Bajnokság III	27	12	1	0	—		—		28	12
Dunakanyar-Vác	2003–04	Nemzeti Bajnokság II	31	10	—		—		—		31	10
Dunakanyar-Vác	Total		72	29	1	0	—		—		73	29
Újpest	2004–05	Nemzeti Bajnokság I	4	0	1	0	1 (Note: Appearance in UEFA Cup)	0	—		6	0
Újpest	2005–06	Nemzeti Bajnokság I	1	0	0	0	—		—		1	0
Újpest	Total		5	0	1	0	1	0	—		7	0
Honvéd (loan)	2005–06	Nemzeti Bajnokság I	10	1	3	0	—		—		13	1
Rákospalota	2006–07	Nemzeti Bajnokság I	3	0	—		—		—		3	0
Dunakanyar-Vác	2006–07	Nemzeti Bajnokság I	9	1	—		—		—		9	1
Pécs	2007–08	Nemzeti Bajnokság II	18	3	—		—		—		18	3
Szolnok	2008–09	Nemzeti Bajnokság II	15	2	2	1	—		—		17	3
Vácrátót	2008–09	Megyei Bajnokság II	7	11	—		—		—		7	11
Vácrátót	2009–10	Megyei Bajnokság III	19	24	—		—		3 (Note: Appearance(s) in Pest Megyei Kupa)	5	22	29
Vácrátót	2010–11	Megyei Bajnokság III	19	35	—		—		3 (Note: One appearance and one goal in Pest Megyei Kupa, two appearances in Bajnokok Tornája)	1	22	36
Vácrátót	2011–12	Megyei Bajnokság II	25	31	—		—		1	0	26	31
Vácrátót	2012–13	Megyei Bajnokság II	14	13	—		—		—		14	13
Vácrátót	Total		84	114	—		—		7	6	91	120
Csomád	2012–13	Megyei Bajnokság II	13	20	—		—		2 (Note: Appearances in Megyei Bajnokság II promotion play-offs)	2	15	22
Csomád	2013–14	Megyei Bajnokság I	26	14	—		—		3	5	29	19
Csomád	2014–15	Megyei Bajnokság II	14	17	—		—		3	3	17	20
Csomád	Total		53	51	—		—		8	10	61	61
Cso-Ki Sport	2015–16	Megyei Bajnokság I	18	7	—		—		2 (Note: One appearance in Magyar Kupa qualifying rounds and one appearance in Bajnokok Tornája)	0	20	7
Career total			287	208	7	1	1	0	17	16	312	225

== Honours ==
Vácrátót

- Megyei Bajnokság III – Pest Group A: 2010–11

Csomád

- Megyei Bajnokság II – Pest North: 2012–13
- Megyei Bajnokság II – Pest West: 2014–15

Individual

- Megyei Bajnokság III – Pest Group A top scorer: 2010–11
- Megyei Bajnokság II – Pest West top scorer: 2011–12
