= Gergely Rusvay =

Hungarian footballer

Personal information
- Full name: Gergely Rusvay
- Date of birth: 15 August 1978 (age 48)
- Place of birth: Vác, Hungary
- Height: 1.80 m (5 ft 11 in)
- Position: Midfielder

Team information
- Current team: Vác
- Number: 6

Youth career
- Vác-Újbuda LTC

Senior career*
Years	Team	Apps	(Gls)
- Vác-Újbuda LTC
- Wilker
- Vác-Újbuda LTC
- Kalocsa
- Pásztó
- Vác-Újbuda LTC
2008–	Kecskeméti TE		
- Vác
- * Club domestic league appearances and goals

Gergely Rusvay (born 15 August 1978 in Vác) is a Hungarian football player who currently plays for Vác.
