= Viktor Szabó =

Hungarian footballer

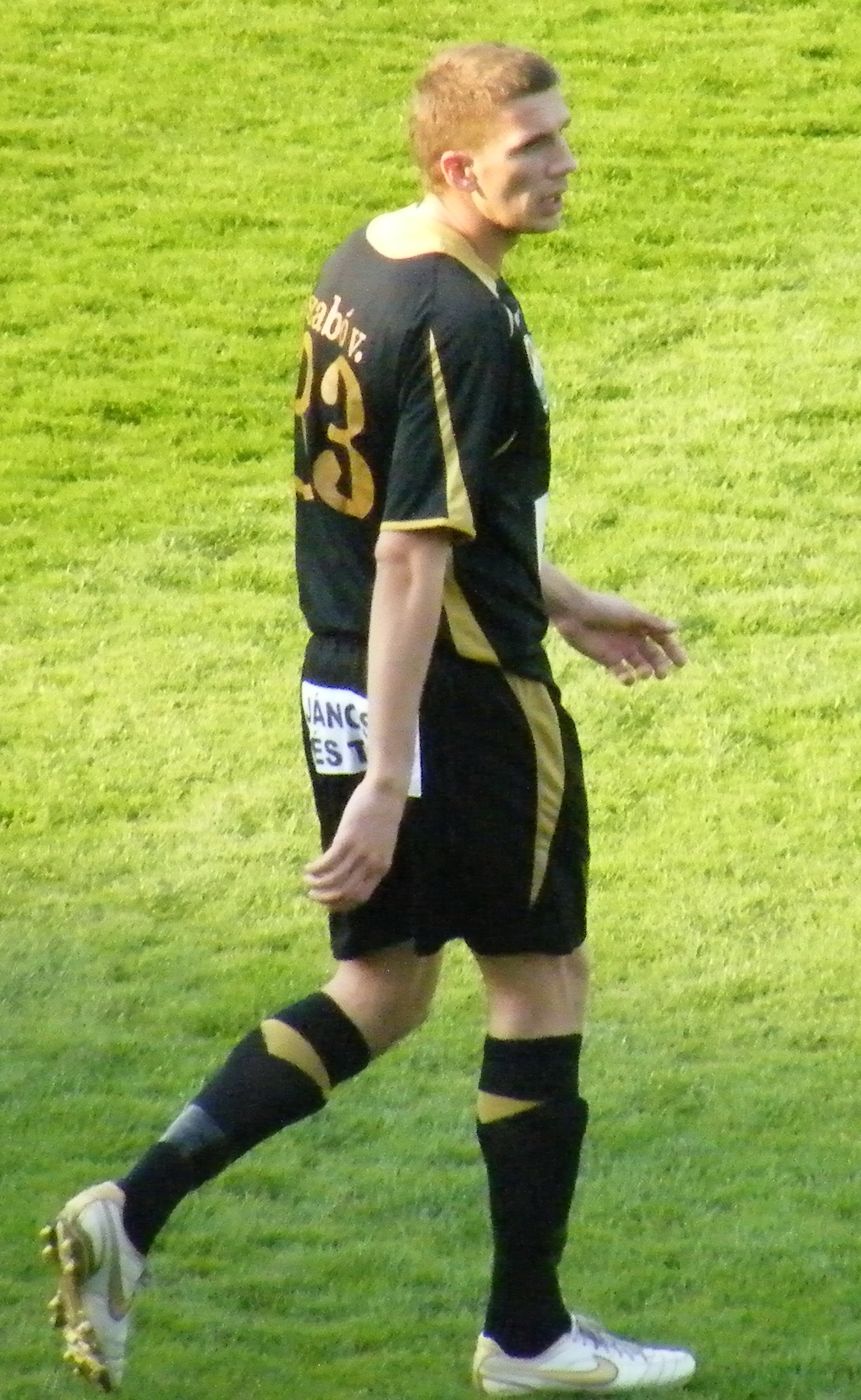

Personal information
- Full name: Viktor Szabó
- Date of birth: 23 July 1986 (age 40)
- Place of birth: Gyöngyös, Hungary
- Height: 1.92 m (6 ft 3 1/2 in)
- Position: Forward

Team information
- Current team: Soproni VSE

Senior career*
Years	Team	Apps	(Gls)
2004–2008	Vác-Újbuda LTC	79	(16)
2008–2018	Diósgyőri VTK	34	(1)
2018–	Soproni VSE		
- * Club domestic league appearances and goals as of 8 January 2010

Viktor Szabó (born 23 July 1986) is a Hungarian football player who currently plays for Soproni VSE.
