= László Makrai =

Hungarian footballer

Personal information
- Full name: László Makrai
- Date of birth: 8 January 1985 (age 41)
- Place of birth: Vác, Hungary
- Height: 1.88 m (6 ft 2 in)
- Position: Centre back

Team information
- Current team: Cegléd

Youth career
- 2002–2004: Vasas

Senior career*
Years	Team	Apps	(Gls)
2004–2007	Vác	77	(5)
2007–2009	Felcsút	36	(1)
2009–2011	BKV Előre	62	(8)
2011–2012	Gyirmót	20	(2)
2012–2013	Veszprém	9	(0)
2013–2017	Cegléd	114	(5)
2017–2019	Dabas	50	(4)
2019	Dabas–Gyón	23	(4)
2019–	Cegléd	13	(1)
- * Club domestic league appearances and goals as of 00:07, 27 November 2019 (UTC)

László Makrai (born 8 January 1985) is a Hungarian professional footballer who plays for Ceglédi VSE.

== Career statistics ==
Appearances and goals by club, season and competition
Club	Season	League			Cup		League Cup		Europe		Total	
Club	Season	Division	Apps	Goals	Apps	Goals	Apps	Goals	Apps	Goals	Apps	Goals
Vác
Vác	2004–05	Nemzeti Bajnokság II	25	2	0	0	0	0	0	0	25	2
Vác	2005–06	Nemzeti Bajnokság II	24	3	0	0	0	0	0	0	24	3
Vác	2006–07	Nemzeti Bajnokság I	28	0	0	0	0	0	0	0	28	0
Vác	Total		77	5	0	0	0	0	0	0	77	5
Felcsút
Felcsút	2007–08	Nemzeti Bajnokság II	26	1	0	0	0	0	0	0	26	1
Felcsút	2008–09	Nemzeti Bajnokság II	15	0	2	0	0	0	0	0	17	0
Felcsút	Total		41	1	2	0	0	0	0	0	43	1
BKV Előre
BKV Előre	2008–09	Nemzeti Bajnokság II	10	2	0	0	0	0	0	0	10	2
BKV Előre	2009–10	Nemzeti Bajnokság II	28	3	1	0	0	0	0	0	29	3
BKV Előre	2010–11	Nemzeti Bajnokság II	24	3	3	0	0	0	0	0	27	3
BKV Előre	Total		62	8	4	0	0	0	0	0	66	8
Gyirmót	2011–12	Nemzeti Bajnokság II	20	2	2	1	4	0	0	0	26	3
Veszprém	2012–13	Nemzeti Bajnokság II	9	0	2	0	0	0	0	0	11	0
Cegléd
Cegléd	2012–13	Nemzeti Bajnokság II	14	2	0	0	0	0	0	0	14	2
Cegléd	2013–14	Nemzeti Bajnokság II	26	1	1	0	3	0	0	0	30	1
Cegléd	Total		40	3	1	0	3	0	0	0	44	3
Career total			249	19	11	1	7	0	0	0	267	20

Updated to games played as of 18 May 2014.
