= Norbert Palásthy =

Hungarian footballer (born 1981)

Personal information
- Full name: Norbert Palásthy
- Date of birth: 10 February 1981 (age 45)
- Place of birth: Vác, Hungary
- Height: 1.92 m (6 ft 3 1/2 in)
- Position: Forward

Youth career
- 1995–1998: Vác
- 1998–2003: Ferencváros

Senior career*
Years	Team	Apps	(Gls)
2002–2003	Ferencváros	0	(0)
2003	Fót	14	(4)
2003–2004	Rákospalota	?	(?)
2004–2007	Vác	70	(31)
2007–2010	Budapest Honvéd	22	(3)
2007–2010	→ Budapest Honvéd II	13	(4)
2010–2011	Paks	1	(0)
2010	→ Vác (loan)	12	(7)
2011	Mezőkövesd	8	(2)
2011–2013	Vác	30	(12)
2013–2014	Eger	6	(0)
2014–2015	Veresegyház	12	(3)
2015–	Érd	32	(10)
- * Club domestic league appearances and goals as of 10 February 2017

Norbert Palásthy (born 10 February 1981 in Vác) is a retired Hungarian football player who last played for Érdi VSE.

== Club career ==
=== Budapest Honved ===
He made his debut on 7 July 2007 against FC Sopron in a match that ended 1–0.

== Club honours ==
=== Ferencvárosi TC ===
- Hungarian National Championship I:
  - Runners-up: 2002–03
- Hungarian Cup:
  - Winners: 2002–03
- Hungarian Super Cup:
  - Runners-up: 2002–03

=== Vác-Újbuda LTC ===
- Hungarian National Championship II:
  - Winner: 2005–06
  - 3rd place: 2004–05

=== Budapest Honvéd FC ===
- Hungarian Cup:
  - Winner: 2008–09
  - Runners-up: 2007–08
- Hungarian Super Cup:
  - Runners-up: 2007, 2009

== Retirement Status ==
Norbert is a retired Hungarian football player who last played for Érdi VSE. Retired from professional football in 2017
