= Péter Farkas (footballer) =

Hungarian footballer

Personal information
- Full name: Péter Farkas
- Date of birth: 11 July 1987 (age 39)
- Place of birth: Cegléd, Hungary
- Height: 1.80 m (5 ft 11 in)
- Position: Midfielder

Team information
- Current team: Veresegyház VSK

Youth career
- 2002–2005: Vác

Senior career*
Years	Team	Apps	(Gls)
2005–2011	Vác	136	(1)
2011–2012	Kaposvár	4	(0)
2012–2013	Vác	14	(0)
2013	Berkenye SE	16	(2)
2013–2016	Vác		
2016–2019	Dunaharaszt	86	(4)
2019–	Veresegyház VSK	15	(0)
- * Club domestic league appearances and goals as of 15:30, 23 November 2019 (UTC)

Péter Farkas (born 11 July 1987) is a Hungarian football player who currently plays for Veresegyház VSK.
