= István Hámori =

Hungarian footballer

Personal information
- Date of birth: 30 September 1967 (age 59)
- Position: Goalkeeper

Senior career*
Years	Team	Apps	(Gls)
1990–1992	Vasas SC		
1992–1999	Vác FC		
2000–2003	FC Lahti		
2006–2007	Vác FC		
- * Club domestic league appearances and goals

István Hámori (born 30 September 1967) is a retired Hungarian football goalkeeper.
