= Dániel Lettrich =

Hungarian footballer (born 1983)

Personal information
- Date of birth: 21 April 1983 (age 43)
- Height: 1.82 m (6 ft 0 in)
- Position: Midfielder

Team information
- Current team: Újbuda TC

Senior career*
Years	Team	Apps	(Gls)
2004–2006	Újpest FC	7	(0)
2006–2007	Dunakanyar-Vác FC	5	(0)
- * Club domestic league appearances and goals

Dániel Lettrich (born 21 April 1983) is a Hungarian midfielder currently playing for Újbuda TC. He has previously played for Újpest FC and Dunakanyar-Vác FC. He has not made an appearance for Újbuda TC's first team yet.
