= Dániel Juhász =

Hungarian footballer

Personal information
- Full name: Dániel Juhász
- Date of birth: 17 May 1992 (age 34)
- Place of birth: Budapest, Hungary
- Height: 1.87 m (6 ft 1 1/2 in)
- Position: Defender

Team information
- Current team: Paks
- Number: 17

Youth career
- 2003–2006: Ferencváros
- 2006–2011: Vasas

Senior career*
Years	Team	Apps	(Gls)
2011–2013	Zalaegerszeg	12	(0)
2013–	Paks	3	(0)

International career^{‡}
2012–	Hungary U21	1	(0)
- * Club domestic league appearances and goals as of 21 April 2013 ‡ National team caps and goals as of 7 April 2013

Dániel Juhász (born 17 May 1992) is a Hungarian football player who currently plays for Paksi SE.

== Career statistics ==
Appearances and goals by club, season and competition
Club	Season	League			Cup		League Cup		Europe		Total	
Club	Season	Division	Apps	Goals	Apps	Goals	Apps	Goals	Apps	Goals	Apps	Goals
Zalaegerszeg
Zalaegerszeg	2011–12	Nemzeti Bajnokság I	0	0	3	0	6	0	0	0	9	0
Zalaegerszeg	2012–13	Nemzeti Bajnokság II	14	0	1	0	3	0	0	0	15	0
Zalaegerszeg	Total		14	0	4	0	9	0	0	0	27	0
Paks	2012–13	Nemzeti Bajnokság I	3	0	0	0	0	0	0	0	3	0
Career total			17	0	4	0	9	0	0	0	30	0

Updated to games played as of 21 April 2013.
