= Zsolt Lázár =

Hungarian footballer

Personal information
- Full name: Zsolt Albert Lázár
- Date of birth: 7 November 1985 (age 40)
- Place of birth: Plandište, SFR Yugoslavia
- Height: 1.78 m (5 ft 10 in)
- Position: Midfielder

Team information
- Current team: Issimo SE
- Number: 11

Youth career
- 2002–2003: Budapest Honvéd

Senior career*
Years	Team	Apps	(Gls)
2003–2007	Budapest Honvéd	40	(1)
2007–2008	Vác	10	(0)
2008–2010	Tatabánya	21	(2)
2010	Cegléd	11	(1)
2010–2012	Törökbálinti TC	19	(0)
2012	Dunaharaszti	20	(2)
2012–2015	Dunaújváros	50	(2)
2015–2016	Kisvárda	12	(1)
2016	Győri ETO	2	(0)
2017–2018	BFC Siófok	22	(0)
2018–2019	Monor	14	(0)
2019–2020	Budapesti VSC	17	(0)
2020	TSU Jeging	10	(3)
2021–2022	Maglódi TC	47	(2)
2023–	Issimo SE	41	(1)
- * Club domestic league appearances and goals as of 19:37, 27 November 2024 (UTC)

Zsolt Albert Lázár (born 7 November 1985) is a Hungarian football player who currently plays for Issimo SE.
