= Balázs Sinkó =

Hungarian footballer

Personal information
- Date of birth: 9 February 1979 (age 47)
- Place of birth: Hungary
- Position: Midfielder

Senior career*
Years	Team	Apps	(Gls)
-1999	Szolnoki MÁV FC	3	(0)
1999-2000	Budapesti VSC	6	(0)
- Szolnoki MÁV FC
-2006/2007	Vác FC	9+	(0+)
2006/2007	Jászberényi FC	15	(3)
2008-2009	Ítróttarfelag Fuglafjarðar	49	(6)
2013/14-2014/15	Monori SE	11+	(0+)
2014/15-	Üllő SE	114+	(19+)
- * Club domestic league appearances and goals

Balázs Sinkó (born 9 February 1979 in Hungary) is a Hungarian retired footballer.
