= Martin Svintek =

Slovak footballer

Personal information
- Date of birth: 17 February 1975 (age 51)
- Height: 1.76 m (5 ft 9 in)
- Position: Midfielder

Senior career*
Years	Team	Apps	(Gls)
–1998	Lokomotíva Bučina Zvolen		
1998–1999?	Rimavská Sobota		
2004–2006	Dukla Banská Bystrica		
2006	Dunakanyar-Vác		
2007	ŽP Šport Podbrezová		
- * Club domestic league appearances and goals

Martin Svintek (born 17 February 1975) is a retired Slovak football midfielder.
