= Leo (footballer, born December 1989) =

Brazilian footballer

Personal information
- Full name: Leandro Mariano da Silva
- Date of birth: 11 December 1989 (age 36)
- Place of birth: Gaspar, Brazil
- Position: Striker

Youth career
- –2008: Brusque

Senior career*
Years	Team	Apps	(Gls)
2008	FK Siad Most	1	(0)
2009	Politehnica Iași		
- * Club domestic league appearances and goals

Leandro Mariano da Silva (born 11 December 1989), known as just Leo, is a Brazilian striker.

== Career ==
Leo began his career in his hometown with Brusque and then joined FK Siad Most in the summer of 2008. He played his one and only game in Czech Republic in the Druhá liga on 1 November 2008 against 1. HFK Olomouc.

On 26 February 2009 he moved from FK Siad Most to Politehnica Iași, signing a six month contract between 30 June 2009.
