= Tibor Nyári =

Hungarian footballer

Personal information
- Full name: Tibor Nyári
- Date of birth: 11 June 1986 (age 40)
- Place of birth: Győr, Hungary
- Height: 1.88 m (6 ft 2 in)
- Position: Midfielder

Youth career
- 2003–2006: Győr

Senior career*
Years	Team	Apps	(Gls)
2006–2011	Győr	14	(1)
2008	→ Gyirmót (loan)	19	(0)
2011–2013	Siófok	45	(3)
2013–2015	Paks	4	(0)

International career
2007–2008	Hungary U-21	1	(0)
- * Club domestic league appearances and goals

Tibor Nyári (born 11 June 1986 in Győr) is a retired Hungarian football player.
