= Ligeti Stadion =

Coordinates: 47°46′03″N 19°08′17″E

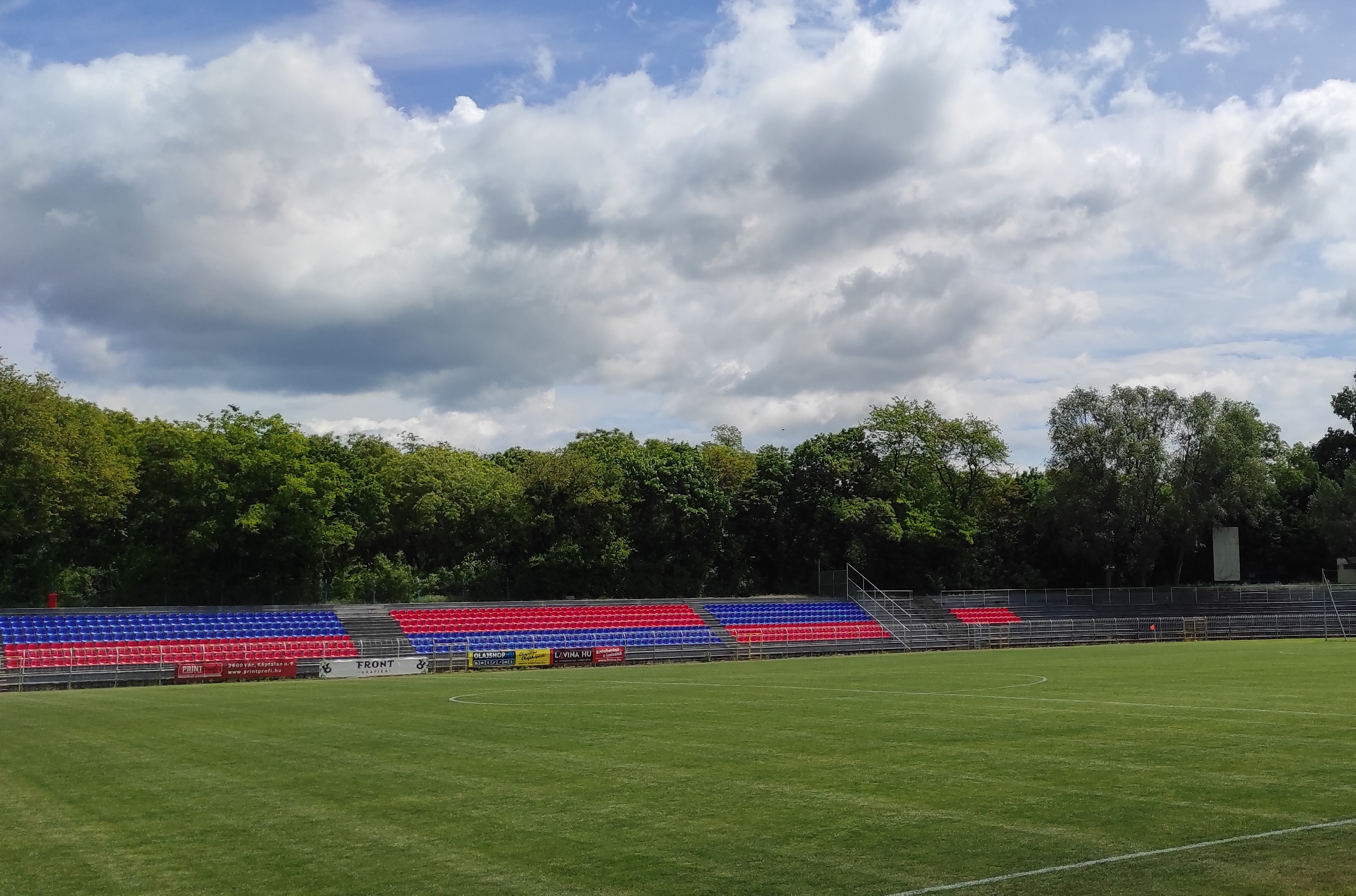
- Interactive map of Ligeti Stadion
- Full name: Ligeti Stadion
- Location: Vác, Hungary
- Owner: Vác FC
- Capacity: 9,000
- Surface: Grass; Field
- Record attendance: 15,000 (Hungary vs Soviet Union, 5 June 1982)
- Field size: 105 m × 68 m (344 ft × 223 ft)

Construction
- Opened: 1967

Tenant
- Vác FC

Website
- www.magyarfutball.hu

Ligeti Stadion is a multi-use stadium in Vác, Hungary. It is used mostly for football matches and is the home stadium of Vác FC. The stadium is able to hold 9,000 people.
