= Vác FC =

Hungarian football club

- Full name: Vác Futball Club
- Founded: 1899; 127 years ago
- Ground: Ligeti Stadion, Vác
- Capacity: 9,000
- Chairman: Károly Iványi
- Manager: Attila Burzi
- League: MB I Pest
- 2025–26: MB I Pest, 10th of 16
- Website: www.vac-vlse.hu
Home colours	Away colours

Vác FC is a Hungarian football club based in Vác, north of Budapest. The club of the fourth division of the Hungarian football league was established in June 1899 as Váci Városi SE plays its home matches at the Stadion Városi Vác. Before 2009, the club was known by a variety of other names.

== Name ==
The team has undergone a number of name changes since its inception, often due to the politics of the time, and since 2003 has been named after the Dunakanyar, Hungarian for Danube Bend, the point where the Danube river changes direction near where Vác is located.

- 1899–48: Váci SE
- 1948–55: Váci Dolgozók TK
- 1955: Váci Petőfi
- 1955–57: Váci Bástya
- 1957: Váci SE
- 1957–61: Váci Petőfi
- 1961–65: Váci Vasas
- 1965–70: Váci SE
- 1970–80: Váci Híradás
- 1980–92: Váci Izzó MTE
- 1992–97: Vác FC-Samsung
- 1997–98: Vác FC
- 1998–01: Vác FC-Zollner
- 2001–03: Váci VLSE
- 2003–07: Dunakanyar-Vác FC
- 2007–09: Vác-Újbuda LTC
- 2009–13: Dunakanyar-Vác FC
- 2013–present: Vác FC

== History ==
The club was founded on 28 November 1899 as Váci Sportegyesület. The main activities were cycling, fencing, gymnastics and tennis. The first (friendly) match of the football team was played on 24 May 1904 against Műegyetem FC (now Műegyetemi AFC – university team in Budapest, they were in the second league in that time), and lost 0–3.

Before 1926 in the Hungarian football system there were only Budapest teams allowed to play in the first league. There were regional championships (kerületi bajnokság) for the non-Budapest (Hungarian: vidéki) teams. Váci SE has won two regional titles in 1913 and 1924.

After 1926 the new professional league was open for the non-Budapest teams, but Váci SE couldn't afford to have a professional team. In the August 1948 two clubs, Váci AC (founded: 1920) and Váci Reménység (founded: 1922) were merged into Váci SE, and the club was renamed as Váci Dolgozók TK.

In 1986–1987 under János Csank the team won the NB II. Division and was promoted to the I. division, where they would spend the next 13 years. They reached the Hungarian Cup final in 1991 and 1992, but lost 0–1 against Ferencvárosi TC and 0–1 after extra time against Újpest FC. In 1991–1992 and 1992–1993 they barely finished in 2nd behind Ferencvárosi TC and later Kispest-Honvéd.

The team's only international wins came in the UEFA Cup. In the UEFA Cup 1991-92 they beat FC Dynamo Moscow 1–0 in the first leg, but lost the second leg 1–4 and did not advance. In the UEFA Cup 1992-93 they defeated their first round opponent F.C. Groningen 1–0 and 1–1, only to be defeated by S.L. Benfica in the second round 1–5 and 0–1. In the UEFA Cup 1993-94 they won their first match against Apollon Limassol 2–0, but lost the second 0–4 and didn't make it out of the first round.

In 1993–1994 they won the Hungarian League for the first and only time. The following year, however, was their most dismal year thus far in the first division, but they reached the cup final again, and lost again against Ferencváros 0–2, 3–4.

They played in the UEFA Champions League 1994-95, losing both matches, 3–0 and 2–1, against Paris Saint-Germain F.C., from France.

They fared little better in the UEFA Cup Winners' Cup 1995-96, where they had one draw and one loss to FK Sileks Kratovo, from the Republic of Macedonia, losing 2–4 agg.

In 2000 the league reorganized to relegate the bottom two teams and Vác, who had put up their most miserable season to date, was relegated to the II. division. By 2001 they fell further to the III. division. After this, with the help of young players—on average 20.7 years old—the team returned to II. division play in 2003.

They won the NB II in 2005–2006. Eastern Division and earned the right to enter the first division. The 2006–2007 saw little success, and the team was relegated at the bottom of the table. Many of the team's players were only semi-professional and work other jobs besides football.

In the summer of 2007 an amateur club from the district XI of Budapest, Újbuda-Lágymányosi TC were merged into the club.

== Honours ==
- Nemzeti Bajnokság I:
  - Winners (1): 1993–94 (as Vác-Samsung)
- Hungarian Cup:
  - Runners-up (3): 1990–91 (as Váci Izzó), 1991–92, 1994–95
- Nemzeti Bajnokság II:
  - Winners (1): 2005–06
  - Runners-up (1): 1986–87 (as Váci Izzó)
- Nemzeti Bajnokság III:
  - Winners (3): 1976–77, 1983–84, 2014–15
- Regional Championship (Kerületi Bajnokság):
  - Winners (2): 1913, 1924

== Seasons ==
The table below shows the seasons of Vác FC.

Season	Tier	Club's name	Position	Pts
1912–13	2	Váci SE	1 / 8	26
1913–14	2	Váci SE	2 / 7	17
1918–19	2	Váci SE	0 / 5	
1919–20	2	Váci SE	2 / 9	
1919–20	2	Váci SE	1 / 4	5
1920–21	2	Váci SE	1 / 5	
1921–22	2	Váci SE	0 / 10	
1922–23	2	Váci SE	0 / 10	
1923–24	2	Váci SE	1 / 9	23
1924–25	2	Váci SE	2 / 10	24
1925–26	2	Váci SE	6 / 10	13
1926–27	2	Váci SE	3 / 9	22
1927–28	2	Váci SE	4 / 11	22
1928–29	2	Váci SE	6 / 12	21
1929–30	2	Váci SE	7 / 10	11
1930–31	2	Váci SE	3 / 10	25
1931–32	2	Váci SE	5 / 11	25
1932–33	2	Váci SE	5 / 14	31
1933–34	2	Váci SE	4 / 12	24
1934–35	2	Váci SE	7 / 12	21
1935–36	2	Váci SE	5 / 12	23
1936–37	2	Váci SE	1 / 12	37
1937–38	2	Váci SE	10 / 14	20
1938–39	2	Váci SE	14 / 14	9
1939–40	3	Váci SE	3 / 12	32
1940–41	4	Váci SE	1 / 14	43
1941–42	3	Váci SE	10 / 12	15
1942–43	3	Váci SE	8 / 14	24
1943–44	3	Váci SE	7 / 16	34
1944–45	2	Váci SE	6 / 16	9
1944–45	3	Váci SE	0 / 12	
1945	2	Váci SE	1 / 10	
1945–46	2	Váci SE	1 / 14	41
1946–47	2	Váci SE	9 / 14	24
1947–48	2	Váci SE	11 / 14	17
1948–49	2	Váci DTK (Váci SE)	11 / 16	25
1949–50	2	Váci DTK	12 / 16	25
1950	2	Váci Dolgozók TK	12 / 16	13
1951	2	Váci Vörös Lobogó	2 / 14	38
1952	2	Váci Vörös Lobogó	5 / 18	37
1953	2	Váci Vörös Lobogó	5 / 16	32
1954	2	Váci Vörös Lobogó	7 / 16	36
1955	2	Váci Bástya	9 / 16	27
1956	2	Váci SE	9 / 16	27
1957–58	2	Váci Petőfi SE	9 / 19	35
1958–59	2	Váci Petőfi SE	6 / 16	31
1959–60	2	Váci Petőfi	13 / 16	26
1960–61	2	Vác Vasas	16 / 16	18
1961–62	3	Váci Vasas	11 / 16	25
1962–63	3	Váci Vasas	7 / 16	32
1963	4	Váci Vasas	8 / 16	16
1964	4	Váci Vasas	13 / 16	25
1965	5	Váci SE	1 / 16	43
1966	4	Váci SE	5 / 16	35
1967	4	Váci SE	2 / 16	42
1968	4	Váci SE	3 / 16	40
1969	4	Váci SE	3 / 16	34
1970	4	Váci Híradás SE	1 / 16	25
1970–71	4	Váci Híradás Vasas SE	1 / 16	46
1971–72	3	Váci Híradás SE	10 / 16	27
1972–73	3	Váci Híradás SE	4 / 16	36
1973–74	3	Váci Híradás	9 / 16	29
1974–75	3	Váci Híradás SE	3 / 20	42
1975–76	3	Váci Híradás SE	2 / 19	48
1976–77	3	Váci Híradás SE	1 / 20	56
1977–78	2	Váci Híradás Vasas	10 / 20	37
1978–79	2	Váci Híradás	7 / 19	40
1979–80	2	Váci Híradás	5 / 20	42
1980–81	2	Váci Izzó MTE	13 / 20	35
1981–82	2	Váci Izzó MTE	6 / 16	35
1982–83	3	Váci Izzó MTE	4 / 16	40
1983–84	3	Váci Izzó MTE	1 / 16	52
1984–85	2	Váci Izzó MTE	3 / 20	49
1985–86	2	Váci Izzó MTE	10 / 20	36
1986–87	2	Váci Izzó MTE	2 / 20	51
1987–88	1	Váci Izzó MTE	10 / 16	28
1988–89	1	Váci Izzó MTE	8 / 16	45
1989–90	1	Váci Izzó MTE	11 / 16	36
1990–91	1	Váci Izzó MTE	4 / 16	36
1991–92	1	Vác FC Samsung	2 / 16	45
1992–93	1	Vác FC-Samsung	2 / 16	42
1993–94	1	Vác FC-Samsung	1 / 16	46
1994–95	1	Vác FC-Samsung	13 / 16	35
1995–96	1	Vác FC-Samsung	11 / 16	33
1996–97	1	Vác FC	11 / 18	40
1997–98	1	Vác FC Zollner	6 / 18	51
1998–99	1	Vác FC-Zollner	10 / 18	49
1999–00	1	Vác FC	17 / 18	15
2000	3	Vác VLSE	4 / 8	25
2000–01	4	Vác VLSE	3 / 10	36
2001–02	3	Váci VLSE	8 / 13	28
2002–03	3	Vác VLSE	3 / 12	40
2002–03	3	Vác VLSE	2 / 12	56
2003–04	2	Dunakanyar-Vác FC	14 / 18	38
2004–05	2	Dunakanyar-Vác FC	3 / 14	42
2005–06	2	Dunakanyar-Vác FC	1 / 16	61
2006–07	1	Dunakanyar Vác FC	16 / 16	19
2007–08	2	Vác - Újbuda LTC	6 / 16	45
2008–09	2	Vác - Újbuda LTC	9 / 16	37
2009–10	2	Dunakanyar-Vác FC	3 / 15	52
2010–11	2	Dunakanyar-Vác FC	4 / 16	60
2011–12	2	Dunakanyar-Vác FC	11 / 16	38
2012–13	2	Dunakanyar-Vác FC	0 / 16	0
2013–14	4	Vác FC	1 / 16	82
2014–15	3	Vác FC	1 / 16	63
2015–16	2	Vác FC	11 / 16	33
2016–17	2	Vác FC	6 / 20	59
2017–18	2	Vác FC	10 / 20	51
2018–19	2	Vác FC	13 / 20	46
2019–20	2	Vác FC	19 / 20	12
2020–21	3	Vác FC	15 / 20	47
2021–22	3	Vác FC	16 / 20	39
2022–23	4	Vác VLSE	10 / 16	34
2023–24	4	Vác VLSE	7 / 16	43
2024–25	4	Vác VLSE	10 / 16	42
2025–26	4	Vác VLSE	10 / 16	37

== European cup history ==
=== UEFA Cup Winners' Cup ===
Season	Competition	Round	Country	Club	Home	Away	Aggregate
1995–96	UEFA Cup Winners' Cup	Qualifying Round	(North Macedonia)	FK Sileks Kratovo	1–1	1–3	2–4

=== UEFA Intertoto Cup ===
Season	Competition	Round	Country	Club	Home	Away	Aggregate
1989	UEFA Intertoto Cup	Group 3	(Austria)	FC Tirol Innsbruck	0–0	0–1	
		Group 3	(Bulgaria)	FC Etar Veliko Tarnovo	1–0	0–0	
		Group 3	(Switzerland)	AC Bellinzona	1–0	1–1	
1991	UEFA Intertoto Cup	Group 3	(Austria)	SV Austria Salzburg	1–2	1–1	
		Group 3	(Germany)	Hallescher FC	2–1	1–5	
		Group 3	(Denmark)	Ikast FS	2–0	1–2	
1992	UEFA Intertoto Cup	Group 7	(Slovakia)	SK Slovan Bratislava	2–3	1–5	
		Group 7	(Denmark)	Aarhus GF	2–0	1–0	
		Group 7	(Sweden)	Kiruna FF	5–2	2–0	
1994	UEFA Intertoto Cup	Group 4, 1st game	(Germany)	Hamburger SV	1–2		
		Group 4, 2nd game	(Slovakia)	FK Inter Bratislava		3–2	
		Group 4, 3rd game	(Czech Republic)	SK Dynamo Ceske Budejovice	2–1		
		Group 4, 4th game	(Denmark)	Ikast FS		4–0	

=== UEFA Cup ===
Season	Competition	Round	Country	Club	Home	Away	Aggregate
1991–92	UEFA Cup	1. Round	(Soviet Union)	FC Dynamo Moscow	1–0	1–4	2–4
1992–93	UEFA Cup	1. Round	(Netherlands)	FC Groningen	1–0	1–1	2–1
		2. Round	(Portugal)	S.L. Benfica	0–1	1–5	1–6
1993–94	UEFA Cup	1. Round	(Cyprus)	Apollon Limassol	2–0	0–4	2–4 (aet)

=== UEFA Champions League ===
Season	Competition	Round	Country	Club	Home	Away	Aggregate
1994–95	UEFA Champions League	Qualifying Round	(France)	Paris Saint-Germain	1–2	0–3	1–5

=== All-time International Results ===
Competition	MP	W	D	L	GF–GA	Dif.
Champions League	2	0	0	2	1–5	−4
Winner's Cup	2	0	1	1	2–4	−2
UEFA Cup	8	3	1	4	7–15	−8
TOTAL	12	3	2	7	10–24	−14
