= 2008–09 FC Fehérvár season =

Fehérvár
2008–09 season
- Manager: László Disztl (until 18 August); István Varga (from 18 August)
- Stadium: Sóstói Stadion
- Nemzeti Bajnokság I: 6th
- Magyar Kupa: Round of 16
- Ligakupa: Winners
Home colours	Away colours	Third colours

The 2008–09 season was Football Club Fehérvár's 40th competitive season, 10th consecutive season in the Nemzeti Bajnokság I and 67th year in existence as a football club. In addition to the domestic league, Fehérvár participated in this season's editions of the Magyar Kupa and Ligakupa.

== First team squad ==
Squad at the end of the season

Predicted line-up for the Nemzeti Bajnokság I home match against Debrecen on 6 March 2009

Note: Flags indicate national team as defined under FIFA eligibility rules; some limited exceptions apply. Players may hold more than one non-FIFA nationality.

No.	Pos.	Nation	Player
1	GK	HUN	Zsolt Sebők
2	DF	SRB	Marko Anđić
3	DF	HUN	Gábor Horváth II
4	DF	HUN	Dávid Mohl
5	DF	HUN	Ákos Koller
6	MF	HUN	Tamás Sifter
8	MF	HUN	Attila Polonkai
9	FW	HUN	Illés Sitku
10	MF	HUN	Zsolt Dvéri
11	FW	CRO	Milan Pavličić
12	MF	MNE	Darko Karadžić (loaned from Rad)
13	DF	MNE	Ilija Radović
14	MF	HUN	Balázs Farkas
15	MF	HUN	Dániel Nagy
17	FW	HUN	Dénes Szakály
18	FW	MNE	Goran Vujović

No.	Pos.	Nation	Player
19	FW	HUN	Péter Lelkes
20	DF	HUN	Pál Lázár
21	FW	BRA	André Alves
22	GK	SRB	Nenad Filipović
23	MF	UKR	Oleksandr Tkachuk
25	MF	HUN	Ákos Elek
26	MF	BRA	César Romero
27	DF	CRO	Ivan Buljabasić
29	FW	BRA	Alison Silva
30	DF	HUN	Zsolt Bencze
31	GK	HUN	Péter Halasi
32	DF	HUN	Gábor Kocsis
33	FW	HUN	János Máté
34	GK	HUN	Zoltán Czirjék
37	FW	HUN	Tamás Kulcsár (loaned from MTK)

== Competitions ==
=== Overview ===
Competition	First match	Last match	Starting round	Final position	Record							
Competition	First match	Last match	Starting round	Final position	Pld	W	D	L	GF	GA	GD	Win %
Nemzeti Bajnokság I	26 July 2008	29 May 2009	Matchday 1	6th	30	14	6	10	42	34	+8	46.67
Magyar Kupa	3 September 2008	21 October 2008	Third round	Round of 16	4	2	1	1	6	3	+3	50.00
Ligakupa	1 October 2008	13 May 2009	Group stage	Winners	15	10	5	0	36	11	+25	66.67
Total					49	26	12	11	84	48	+36	53.06

Source: Competitions

=== Nemzeti Bajnokság I ===
==== League table ====
Pos	Team	Pld	W	D	L	GF	GA	GD	Pts
4	Zalaegerszeg	30	15	7	8	52	44	+8	52
5	Kecskemét	30	14	6	10	55	44	+11	48
6	Fehérvár	30	14	6	10	42	34	+8	48
7	MTK Budapest	30	13	6	11	43	41	+2	45
8	Győr	30	11	10	9	57	41	+16	43

Source: soccerway.com
Rules for classification: 1st points; 2nd overall wins; 3rd goal difference; 4th goals scored

==== Results summary ====
Overall								Home						Away					
Pld	W	D	L	GF	GA	GD	Pts	W	D	L	GF	GA	GD	W	D	L	GF	GA	GD
30	14	6	10	42	34	+8	48	7	4	4	23	16	+7	7	2	6	19	18	+1

Source: HFF

==== Results by round ====
Round	1	2	3	4	5	6	7	8	9	10	11	12	13	14	15	16	17	18	19	20	21	22	23	24	25	26	27	28	29	30
Ground	A	H	A	H	A	H	A	H	A	H	A	H	A	A	H	H	A	H	A	H	A	H	A	H	A	H	A	H	H	A
Result	L	W	L	L	W	D	W	L	W	W	L	W	L	D	D	W	L	L	L	W	D	L	W	W	W	D	W	D	W	W
Position	14	9	14	14	10	12	9	10	9	7	9	6	7	8	9	6	9	9	9	8	9	11	9	7	7	8	5	6	6	6

Source: Matches
A = Away; H = Home; W = Win; D = Draw; L = Loss

==== Matches ====
26 July 2008 1	Siófok	1–0	Fehérvár	Siófok
20:00 CEST (UTC+2)	Sütő 17'	Report	Sifter (yellow card) 72'	Stadium: Révész Street Stadium; Attendance: 4,500; Referee: Zoltán Iványi

2 August 2008 2	Fehérvár	1–0	Haladás	Székesfehérvár
20:00 CET (UTC+1)	Romero 24'; G. Horváth II (yellow card) 30'; Dvéri (yellow card) 72'; Csobánki (yellow card) 87'	Report	Molnár (yellow card) 42'; Rajos (yellow card) 48'; Schimmer (yellow card) 57'; Kenesei (yellow card) 70'	Stadium: Sóstói Stadion; Attendance: 2,186; Referee: Ádám Németh

10 August 2008 3	Debrecen	1–0	Fehérvár	Debrecen
20:00 CEST (UTC+2)	L. Oláh 32'; Czvitkovics (yellow card) 52'; Takács (yellow card) 90'	Report	Mohl (yellow card) 6'; Dvéri (yellow card) 17'; Anđić (yellow card) 70'; B. Farkas (yellow card) 86'	Stadium: Oláh Gábor utcai Stadion; Attendance: 6,500; Referee: Mihály Fábián

16 August 2008 4	Fehérvár	1–2	Kecskemét	Székesfehérvár
20:00 CEST (UTC+2)	G. Horváth II (yellow card) 18', (goal) 64'; Anđić (yellow card) 56'; Sitku (yellow card) 76'; Mohl (yellow card) 87'	Report	Menyhárt 13'; Csordás 49'; Mbengono (red card) 65'; Čukić (yellow card) 88'; Mitrović (yellow card) 90+4'	Stadium: Sóstói Stadion; Attendance: 1,548; Referee: Ferenc Bede

23 August 2023 5	Rákospalota	1–2	Fehérvár	Budapest
20:00 CEST (UTC+2)	Lisztes 31'; Kapcsos (red card) 40'; T. Nagy (yellow card) 70'; T. Kiss II (yellow card) 82'	Report	G. Horváth II (yellow card) 22'; B. Farkas (yellow card) 48'; Pavličić 51', (yellow card) 79'; Sitku 70'; Romero (yellow card) 70'; Simek (yellow card) 78'; Koller (red card) 90'	Stadium: Stadion Budai II. Laszló; Attendance: 800; Referee: József Berger

30 August 2023 6	Fehérvár	1–1	Kaposvár	Székesfehérvár
20:00 CEST (UTC+2)	Pavličić 31'; Romero (yellow card) 49'; Mohl (yellow card) 66'; D. Nagy (yellow card) 72'	Report	Bogdán 2'; K. Farkas (yellow card) 23'	Stadium: Sóstói Stadion; Attendance: 1,976; Referee: Szabolcs Szilasi

13 September 2008 7	Honvéd	1–2	Fehérvár	Budapest
20:00 CEST (UTC+2)	Maróti 33', (yellow card) 69'; Magoč (yellow card) 40'; Hercegfalvi (yellow card) 53'; Dieng (yellow card) 62'; Smiljanić (yellow card) 90'	Report	Anđić (yellow card) 25'; B. Farkas 37'; Sitku 75'; D. Nagy (yellow card) 82'; Romero (yellow card) 89'	Stadium: Bozsik Stadion; Attendance: 1,300; Referee: Viktor Kassai

19 September 2008 8	Fehérvár	0–2	MTK	Székesfehérvár
19:00 CEST (UTC+2)	Mohl (yellow card) 77'	Report	Lambulić 66'; Á. Szabó 84'	Stadium: Sóstói Stadion; Attendance: 2,500; Referee: Tamás Bognár

27 September 2008 9	Diósgyőr	0–1	Fehérvár	Miskolc
19:00 CEST (UTC+2)	Kamber (yellow card) 42'	Report	Simek 8'; Sifter (yellow card) 38'; Anđić (yellow card) 39'; Mohl (yellow card) 44'	Stadium: Diósgyőri Stadion; Attendance: 3,000; Referee: Zoltán Iványi

4 October 2008 10	Fehérvár	4–1	Paks	Székesfehérvár
18:00 CET (UTC+1)	Vujović 29', 65'; Sitku 61'; Kulcsár 90+3'	Report	T. Kiss I 7', (yellow card) 78'; Hanák (yellow card) 27'; Sipeki (yellow card) 45'; Böde (yellow card) 90'	Stadium: Sóstói Stadion; Attendance: 1,510; Referee: Viktor Kassai

18 October 2008 11	Zalaegerszeg	2–0	Fehérvár	Zalaegerszeg
18:00 CEST (UTC+2)	Balázs 21'; Hajdú (yellow card) 27'; Botiș (yellow card) 33'; Waltner 90+1'	Report	G. Horváth II (yellow card) 27'; Vujović (red card) 61'; Sitku (yellow card) 89'	Stadium: ZTE Arena; Attendance: 4,500; Referee: Gergely Sulyok

25 October 2008 12	Fehérvár	3–2	Győr	Székesfehérvár
18:00 CET (UTC+1)	Sitku 3' (pen.), 64', (yellow card) 59'; Pavličić 39'; G. Horváth II (yellow card) 45'	Report	Bajzát 29' (pen.), (yellow card) 45'; Bicák (yellow card) 41'; Józsi 47'; Zámbó (yellow card) 63'	Stadium: Sóstói Stadion; Attendance: 1,700; Referee: István Vad

1 November 2008 13	Vasas	4–1	Fehérvár	Budapest
15:00 CEST (UTC+2)	Divić 30', 67'; Ba. Tóth 45'; Németh 87'	Report	Pavličić 40'	Stadium: Stadion Rudolf Illovszky; Attendance: 2,000; Referee: Péter Solymosi

8 November 2008 14	Nyíregyháza	1–1	Fehérvár	Nyíregyháza
18:00 CEST (UTC+2)	Bárányos 17'; Zabos (yellow card) 59'; Mboussi (yellow card) 85'	Report	Koller 63'	Stadium: Városi Stadion; Attendance: 4,000; Referee: Szabolcs Szilasi

16 November 2008 15	Fehérvár	0–0	Újpest	Székesfehérvár
17:30 CET (UTC+1)	Koller (yellow card) 75'	Report	Dudić (yellow card) 79'	Stadium: Sóstói Stadion; Attendance: 1,500; Referee: Ferenc Bede

21 February 2009 16	Fehérvár	2–1	Siófok	Székesfehérvár
17:00 CET (UTC+1)	Alves 5'; Polonkai (yellow card) 32', (goal) 58'	Report	Magasföldi (yellow card) 35'; Köntös (yellow card) 53'; S. Kanta 87'	Stadium: Sóstói Stadion; Attendance: 1,000; Referee: Ferenc Bede

6 March 2009 18	Fehérvár	0–1	Debrecen	Székesfehérvár
19:00 CET (UTC+1)	Radović (yellow card) 36'; Sifter (yellow card) 73'; D. Nagy (yellow card) 74'; B. Farkas (red card) 75'; G. Horváth II (red card) 90+1'	Report	Demjén 15'; Z. Kiss (yellow card) 56'	Stadium: Sóstói Stadion; Attendance: 2,200; Referee: István Vad

14 March 2009 19	Kecskemét	2–1	Fehérvár	Kecskemét
18:00 CET (UTC+1)	Kormos 22', 35'; Montvai (yellow card) 75'; Alempijević (yellow card) 90+1'	Report	Radović (yellow card) 44'; D. Szakály (yellow card) 58'; Vujović (yellow card) 59', (goal) 90+2'; Sifter (yellow card) 76'	Stadium: Széktói Stadion; Attendance: 2,200; Referee: Mihály Fábián

21 March 2009 20	Fehérvár	4–0	Rákospalota	Székesfehérvár
18:00 CET (UTC+1)	Radović 10'; D. Nagy 45'; B. Farkas 57'; Vujović (yellow card) 67'; Kulcsár 90+2'	Report	Kőhalmi (yellow card) 26'; Ambrusz (yellow card) 49'; Erős (yellow card) 63'	Stadium: Sóstói Stadion; Attendance: 700; Referee: Ádám Farkas

4 April 2009 21	Kaposvár	1–1	Fehérvár	Kaposvár
19:00 CEST (UTC+2)	Obrić (yellow card) 31', (goal) 31'; Petrók (yellow card) 45'; Z. Kovács II (yellow card) 46'; Zahorecz (red card) 86'	Report	G. Horváth II (yellow card) 39'; B. Farkas 47' (pen.); D. Nagy (yellow card) 57'; Elek (yellow card) 62'; Koller (yellow card) 90+3'	Stadium: Stadion Rákóczi; Attendance: 2,000; Referee: Gergely Sulyok

11 April 2009 22	Fehérvár	0–2	Honvéd	Székesfehérvár
19:00 CEST (UTC+2)	Anđić (yellow card) 26'; Koller (red card) 37'; Vujović (yellow card) 66'; G. Horváth II (red card) 90+3'	Report	Arsenijević (yellow card) 34'; Hercegfalvi 38' (pen.), 45'; Rigonato (yellow card) 56'; Dieng (yellow card) 69'	Stadium: Sóstói Stadion; Attendance: 2,000; Referee: Tamás Bognár

17 April 2009 23	MTK	0–4	Fehérvár	Budapest
19:00 CEST (UTC+2)	Rodenbücher (yellow card) 40'; Pintér (red card) 51'	Report	Elek (yellow card) 36'; Szakály 44', (yellow card) 40'; Vujović 53', 76', 87'	Stadium: Hidegkuti Nándor Stadion; Attendance: 1,000; Referee: Mihály Fábián

25 April 2009 24	Fehérvár	2–1	Diósgyőr	Székesfehérvár
19:00 CET (UTC+1)	Vujović 21'; Alves 33'; Radović (yellow card) 81'	Report	Honma 40'; Gohér (yellow card) 44'; Kamber (yellow card) 51'	Stadium: Sóstói Stadion; Attendance: 2,500; Referee: János Takács

28 April 2009 25	Paks	0–1	Fehérvár	Paks
19:00 CEST (UTC+2)	Pintér (yellow card) 79'	Report	D. Nagy (yellow card) 50'; Alves 67'	Stadium: Fehérvári úti Stadion; Attendance: 1,500; Referee: Péter Solymosi

1 May 2009 26	Fehérvár	1–1	Zalaegerszeg	Székesfehérvár
19:00 CET (UTC+1)	Szakály 28'; G. Horváth II (yellow card) 44'; Polonkai (yellow card) 84'	Report	A. Horváth (yellow card) 60'; Sluka 75'	Stadium: Sóstói Stadion; Attendance: 1,795; Referee: Zsolt Szabó

5 May 2009 17	Haladás	2–1	Fehérvár	Szombathely
19:00 CEST (UTC+2)	Kenesei 49'; Iszlai (yellow card) 65'; Vörös 70'	Report	Oross 15' (o.g.); B. Farkas (yellow card) 75'	Stadium: Rohonci Street Stadium; Attendance: 4,000; Referee: Péter Solymosi
Note: The matches of the 17th round were postponed due to HFF Competition Committee decision.

9 May 2009 27	Győr	1–2	Fehérvár	Győr
19:00 CEST (UTC+2)	M. Kiss (yellow card) 12'; Copa 40'; Zámbó (yellow card) 65'; Jäkl (yellow card) 68'; Stanišić (yellow card) 73'	Report	Vujović 16'; Lázár (yellow card) 32'; Alves (yellow card) 67'; G. Horváth II (yellow card) 79'; Silva 82'	Stadium: ETO Park; Attendance: 3,200; Referee: Zoltán Iványi

16 May 2009 28	Fehérvár	2–2	Vasas	Székesfehérvár
19:00 CET (UTC+1)	Vujović 24'; Radović (yellow card) 25'; G. Horváth II (yellow card) 56'; Anđić 64'	Report	Piller (yellow card) 4', (goal) 56' (pen.); Vukelja 32'; Villám (yellow card) 72'; A. Tóth (yellow card) 88'	Stadium: Sóstói Stadion; Attendance: 1,000; Referee: János Takács

23 May 2009 29	Fehérvár	2–0	Nyíregyháza	Székesfehérvár
19:00 CET (UTC+1)	Sitku 15'; Silva (yellow card) 40', (goal) 75'; G. Horváth II (yellow card) 47'; Dvéri (yellow card) 81'	Report	Miskolczi (yellow card) 8'; D. Oláh (yellow card) 29'; B. Bakos (yellow card) 89'	Stadium: Sóstói Stadion; Attendance: 1,508; Referee: Mihály Fábián

29 May 2009 30	Újpest	1–2	Fehérvár	Budapest
19:00 CEST (UTC+2)	Lipták (yellow card) 49'; Dudić (yellow card) 57'; Kabát 69'; Božić (red card) 90+3'	Report	Alves 30'; Vujović 45', (red card) 90+3'	Stadium: Szusza Ferenc Stadion; Attendance: 4,293; Referee: Zsolt Szabó

=== Magyar Kupa ===
3 September 2008 Third round	Tatabánya	0–3	Fehérvár	Tatabánya
15:30 CEST (UTC+2)	Almási (yellow card) 21'	Report	Sitku (yellow card) 26', (goal) 45'; Kulcsár 32'; D. Nagy 51'	Stadium: Stadion Városi; Referee: Tibor Gyarmati II

23 September 2008 Round of 32	Felcsút	1–1 (a.e.t.) (5–6 p)	Fehérvár	Felcsút
18:00 CEST (UTC+2)	Domján (yellow card) 11'; Móri 99'	Report	G. Horváth II (yellow card) 28'; Anđić (yellow card) 75'; Koller 115'	Stadium: Felcsút Sporttelep; Attendance: 800; Referee: Tamás Arany
Note: Fehérvár won on penalty kicks 6–5.

==== Round of 16 ====
8 October 2008 First leg	Fehérvár	2–1	Debrecen	Székesfehérvár
20:45 CEST (UTC+2)	Vujović (yellow card) 47', (goal) 62', 79'; G. Horváth II (red card) 89'	Report	Csernyánszki (red card) 20'; Leandro 65'; Dombi (yellow card) 87'; Omagbemi (red card) 90'	Stadium: Sóstói Stadion; Referee: Zsolt Szabó

21 October 2008 Second leg	Debrecen	1–0 ((a) 2–2 agg.)	Fehérvár	Debrecen
18:00 CEST (UTC+2)	Komlósi 39'	Report	Mohl (yellow card) 72'; Koller (red card) 90+1'	Stadium: Oláh Gábor utcai Stadion; Referee: Viktor Kassai
Note: 2–2 on aggregate. Debrecen won on away goals.

=== Ligakupa ===
==== Group stage ====
Pos	Team	Pld	W	D	L	GF	GA	GD	Pts	Qualification	FEH	HON	FER	KEC	RAK	BAK
1	Fehérvár	10	7	3	0	29	9	+20	24	Advance to knockout phase	—	2–2	0–0	2–0	4–0	8–0
2	Honvéd	10	5	4	1	33	16	+17	19	Advance to knockout phase	1–1	—	2–2	5–3	8–1	5–1
3	Ferencváros	10	5	4	1	20	10	+10	19		2–3	2–2	—	2–1	3–0	3–0
4	Kecskemét	10	3	2	5	22	17	+5	11		2–3	2–3	0–0	—	2–2	4–0
5	Rákospalota	10	3	1	6	14	28	−14	10		2–4	1–0	2–3	0–3	—	4–1
6	Baktalórántháza	10	0	0	10	3	41	−38	0		0–2	1–5	0–3	0–5	0–2	—

Source: HFF

1 October 2008 1	Fehérvár	4–0	Rákospalota	Székesfehérvár
17:00 CEST (UTC+2)	Kulcsár 15', 19'; Disztl 21'; D. Nagy 67'	Report	Dancs (yellow card) 21'; Hajdú (yellow card) 78'	Stadium: Sóstói Stadion; Attendance: 300; Referee: Gábor Oláh

15 October 2008 2	Baktalórántháza	0–2	Fehérvár	Baktalórántháza
15:00 CEST (UTC+2)	Szilágyi (yellow card) 41'	Report	Dvéri (yellow card) 38'; Lattenstein 51'; Disztl 64'	Stadium: Városi Stadion; Attendance: 100; Referee: Gábor Fajkusz

29 October 2008 3	Fehérvár	0–0	Ferencváros	Székesfehérvár
19:00 CET (UTC+1)	Lattenstein (yellow card) 31'; Csobánki (yellow card) 62'; G. Horváth II (yellow card) 75'	Report	Moussa (yellow card) 75'; Sváb (yellow card) 80'	Stadium: Sóstói Stadion; Attendance: 1,500; Referee: Ádám Németh

5 November 2008 4	Fehérvár	2–2	Honvéd	Székesfehérvár
17:00 CET (UTC+1)	Mohl 26'; Kulcsár (yellow card) 40'; Denysov (yellow card) 63'; Disztl 79'	Report	Dieng 67'; Arsenijević 71'	Stadium: Sóstói Stadion; Attendance: 150; Referee: János Takács

12 November 2008 5	Kecskemét	2–3	Fehérvár	Kecskemét
13:30 CET (UTC+1)	Vlahović (yellow card) 22'; Rusvay 66'; Pénzváltó (red card) 74'; Ábel 88'	Report	Ulvicki 15'; Denysov (yellow card) 42'; Lelkes 49'; D. Nagy 60'; Disztl (yellow card) 77'	Stadium: Széktói Stadion; Attendance: 100; Referee: Sándor Andó-Szabó

29 November 2008 7	Fehérvár	8–0	Baktalórántháza	Székesfehérvár
13:00 CET (UTC+1)	G. Horváth II 8'; Pavličić 19', 26'; Dvéri 37', 40'; Kocsis (yellow card) 38'; Kulcsár 45', 55', 83'	Report		Stadium: Sóstói Stadion; Attendance: 100; Referee: Gergő Janitz

3 December 2008 6	Rákospalota	2–4	Fehérvár	Budapest
13:00 CET (UTC+1)	Dancs (yellow card) 31'; Torma 54', 60'; Gasparik (yellow card) 56'; Erős (yellow card) 58'	Report	Sitku 7', 83' (pen.); Kulcsár 44'; B. Farkas 59'	Stadium: Stadion Budai II. Laszló; Attendance: 50; Referee: János Takács
Note: The match was originally scheduled to play on 22 November 2008, 16:00, but was postponed due to HFF Competition Committee decision.

6 December 2008 8	Ferencváros	2–3	Fehérvár	Budapest
12:00 CET (UTC+1)	Bartha (yellow card) 37'; Nyilasi 75'; Be. Tóth 79'	Report	Anđić (red card) 11'; D. Nagy 16', 43'; G. Horváth II 34', (yellow card) 75'; Radović (yellow card) 45'; Filipović (yellow card) 76'	Stadium: Üllői úti stadion Attendance: 300; Referee: Szabolcs Szilasi

7 February 2009 9	Honvéd	1–1	Fehérvár	Budapest
15:00 CET (UTC+1)	Arsenijević 38'; Genito (yellow card) 82'	Report	Radović (yellow card) 6'; Sitku 23'; G. Horváth II (yellow card) 37'; Lázár (yellow card) 59'	Stadium: Bozsik Stadion; Attendance: 400; Referee: Zoltán Iványi

14 February 2009 10	Fehérvár	2–0	Kecskemét	Székesfehérvár
14:00 CET (UTC+1)	D. Nagy 66'; Anđić (yellow card) 78'; Koller 81'	Report	Grkinić (yellow card) 22'; Farkas (yellow card) 36'; Koncz (yellow card) 67'	Stadium: Sóstói Stadion; Attendance: 100; Referee: Tamás Bognár

==== Knockout phase ====
===== Quarter-finals =====
3 March 2009 First leg	Diósgyőr	0–0	Fehérvár	Miskolc
16:30 CET (UTC+1)	Kamber (yellow card) 41'; Szélpál (yellow card) 84'	Report	Pavličić (yellow card) 21'; Sifter (yellow card) 51'; Elek (yellow card) 81'	Stadium: Diósgyőri Stadion; Attendance: 800; Referee: János Takács

25 March 2009 First leg	Fehérvár	1–0 (1–0 agg.)	Diósgyőr	Székesfehérvár
17:00 CET (UTC+1)	G. Horváth II 71'	Report	Bogunović (yellow card) 35'; V. Szabó (yellow card) 70'	Stadium: Sóstói Stadion; Attendance: 150; Referee: Ádám Németh
Note: Fehérvár won 1-0 on aggregate.

===== Semi-finals =====
29 March 2009 First leg	Fehérvár	2–0	Győr	Székesfehérvár
17:30 CEST (UTC+2)	Vujović (yellow card) 24'; Lázár (yellow card) 35'; Radović (yellow card) 58', (goal) 64'; Alves 80'	Report	Berde (yellow card) 28'; Bicák (yellow card) 31'; Dorogi (yellow card) 37'; Völgyi (yellow card) 60'; Šupić (red card) 75'	Stadium: Sóstói Stadion; Attendance: 200; Referee: Ferenc Bede

8 April 2009 Second leg	Győr	1–1 (1–3 agg.)	Fehérvár	Győr
18:00 CET (UTC+1)	Völgyi (yellow card) 27'; Copa 46'; Pilibaitis (yellow card) 58'; Zámbó (yellow card) 67'	Report	Alves 61'	Stadium: ETO Park; Attendance: 2,500; Referee: Sándor Andó-Szabó
Note: Fehérvár won 3-1 on aggregate.

===== Final =====
13 May 2009 Final	Pécs	1–3	Fehérvár	Siófok
18:00 CEST (UTC+2)	Lantos (red card) 12'; Wittrédi 58'; Koplárovics (yellow card) 64'	Report	Vujović 13' (pen.), 26'; Anđić (yellow card) 36'; Lázár (yellow card) 39'; Silva 69'	Stadium: Révész Géza utcai Stadion; Attendance: 3,000; Referee: Ferenc Bede

== Statistics ==
=== Overall ===
Appearances (Apps) numbers are for appearances in competitive games only, including sub appearances.
Source: Competitions

No.	Player	Pos.	Nemzeti Bajnokság I				Magyar Kupa				Ligakupa				Total			
No.	Player	Pos.	Apps	Goal	Yellow card	Red card	Apps	Goal	Yellow card	Red card	Apps	Goal	Yellow card	Red card	Apps	Goal	Yellow card	Red card
1	(Hungary) Zsolt Sebők	GK	30				4				5				39			
1	(Hungary) Imre Török	GK									1				1			
2	(Serbia) Marko Anđić	DF	27	1	5		3		1		6		2	1	36	1	8	1
3	(Hungary) Gábor Horváth II	DF	22	1	10	2	3		1	1	10	3	3		35	4	14	3
4	(Hungary) Dávid Mohl	DF	20		5		3		1		9	1			32	1	6	
5	(Hungary) Roland Baracskai	FW									2				2			
5	(Hungary) Ákos Koller	DF	22	1	2	2	3	1		1	6	1			31	3	2	3
6	(Hungary) Tamás Kovács	MF									2				2			
6	(Hungary) Tamás Sifter	DF	20		4		4				2		1		26		5	
7	(Hungary) Csaba Balaskó	DF									1				1			
7	(Hungary) Péter Simek	MF	13	1	1		1				2				16	1	1	
8	(Hungary) Attila Polonkai	MF	15	1	2		3				7				25	1	2	
9	(Hungary) Illés Sitku	FW	23	6	3		4	1	1		4	3			31	10	4	
10	(Hungary) Zsolt Dvéri	MF	14		3		3				6	2	1		23	2	4	
11	(Croatia) Milan Pavličić	FW	19	4	1		4				5	2	1		28	6	2	
11	(Hungary) Mihály Ulvicki	MF									5	1			5	1		
12	(Montenegro) Darko Karadžić	MF	2								2				4			
12	(Hungary) Viktor Németh	GK									2				2			
13	(Montenegro) Ilija Radović	DF	16	1	4		2				7	1	3		25	2	7	
13	(Hungary) Gergő Vaszicsku	DF									2				2			
14	(Hungary) Balázs Farkas	MF	29	3	3	1	4				7	1			40	4	3	1
14	(Hungary) Ádám Gyurcsó	FW									3				3			
15	(Hungary) Dániel Nagy	FW	24	1	5		2	1			14	5			40	7	5	
16	(Hungary) Norbert Lattenstein	MF									7	1	1		7	1	1	
16	(Hungary) Viktor Vadász	DF																
17	(Hungary) Dénes Szakály	FW	14	2	2						6				20	2	2	
18	(Hungary) Ádám Csobánki	FW	3		1						8		1		11		2	
18	(Montenegro) Goran Vujović	FW	24	10	3	2	3	2	1		5	2	1		32	14	5	2
19	(Hungary) Péter Lelkes	FW									4	1			4	1		
20	(Hungary) Pál Lázár	DF	20		1		3				10		3		33		4	
21	(Brazil) André Alves	FW	15	4	1						6	2			21	6	1	
21	(Hungary) Tamás Nagy	DF									1				1			
22	(Serbia) Nenad Filipović	GK	1				1				9		1		11		1	
23	(Hungary) Zsolt Fehér	DF																
23	(Ukraine) Oleksandr Tkachuk	MF	2								4				6			
24	(Hungary) Dávid Palkó	FW																
25	(Hungary) Ákos Elek	MF	11		2		1				6		1		18		3	
26	(Brazil) César Romero	MF	9	1	3		1				12				22	1	3	
27	(Croatia) Ivan Buljabasić	DF																
27	(Ukraine) Mykhaylo Denysov	DF									6		2		6		2	
28	(Hungary) Dávid Disztl	FW									5	3	1		5	3	1	
29	(Brazil) Alison Silva	FW	5	2	1						2	1			7	3	1	
30	(Hungary) Zsolt Bencze	DF									7				7			
31	(Hungary) Péter Halasi	GK																
32	(Hungary) Szabolcs Bakos	MF									3				3			
32	(Hungary) Gábor Kocsis	DF	2								2		1		4		1	
33	(Hungary) János Máté	FW	1								3				4			
37	(Hungary) Tamás Kulcsár	FW	10	2			3	1			10	6	1		23	9	1	
Own goals				1												1		
Totals				42	62	7		6	5	2		36	24	1		84	91	10

=== Hat-tricks ===
No.	Player	Against	Result	Date	Competition	Round
37	(Hungary) Tamás Kulcsár	Baktalórántháza (H)	8–0	29 November 2008	Ligakupa	7
18	(Montenegro) Goran Vujović	MTK (A)	4–0	17 April 2009	Nemzeti Bajnokság I	23

=== Clean sheets ===
			Clean sheets			
No.	Player	Games Played	Nemzeti Bajnokság I	Magyar Kupa	Ligakupa	Total
1	(Hungary) Zsolt Sebők	39	7	1	3	11
22	(Serbia) Nenad Filipović	11	1	1	4	6
12	(Hungary) Viktor Németh	2			2	2
1	(Hungary) Imre Török	1			1	1
31	(Hungary) Péter Halasi					
Totals			8	2	10	20
