= 2010–11 Videoton FC season =

Videoton
2010–11 season
- Manager: György Mezey
- Stadium: Sóstói Stadion
- Nemzeti Bajnokság I: 1st
- Magyar Kupa: Runners-up
- Ligakupa: Quarter-finals
- UEFA Europa League: Second qualifying round
- Szuperkupa: Runners-up
- Top goalscorer: League: André Alves (24); All: André Alves (26)
- Highest home attendance: 7,706 vs Ferencváros; 21 August 2010
- Lowest home attendance: 2,000 vs Haladás; 24 September 2010
- Average home league attendance: 3,998

The 2010–11 season was Videoton Football Club's 42nd competitive season, 11th consecutive season in the Nemzeti Bajnokság I and 69th year in existence as a football club. The club also participated in the Magyar Kupa, Ligakupa, Szuperkupa and UEFA Europa League.

== Squad ==
Note: Flags indicate national team as defined under FIFA eligibility rules; some limited exceptions apply. Players may hold more than one non-FIFA nationality.

No.	Pos.	Nation	Player
1	GK	HUN	Zsolt Sebők
2	DF	SRB	Marko Andić
4	DF	HUN	Sándor Hidvégi
5	DF	HUN	Zoltán Lipták
6	MF	SRB	Dušan Vasiljević
7	MF	HUN	Dénes Szakály
8	MF	HUN	Attila Polonkai
10	MF	SWE	Bojan Djordjic
12	GK	SLO	Tomáš Tujvel
13	MF	SWE	Martin Kayongo-Mutumba
14	MF	HUN	Balázs Farkas I
15	MF	HUN	Dániel Nagy

No.	Pos.	Nation	Player
16	FW	HUN	András Gosztonyi
17	FW	SRB	Nemanja Nikolić
19	FW	HUN	László Lencse
20	DF	HUN	Pál Lázár
21	FW	BRA	Andre Alves
22	GK	MNE	Mladen Božović
23	DF	HUN	Tamás Vaskó
25	MF	HUN	Ákos Elek
26	MF	CRO	Damir Milanović
31	DF	HUN	Martin Izing
—	FW	HUN	Ádám Gyurcsó
—	FW	HUN	Bence Elek

=== Out on loan ===
No. / Pos. / Nation / Player; 3 / DF / HUN / Gábor Horváth (to (Netherlands) NAC Breda)	No. / Pos. / Nation / Player; 18 / MF / MNE / Goran Vujović (to Kecskeméti TE)

== Transfers ==
In: Note: Flags indicate national team as defined under FIFA eligibility rules; some limited exceptions apply. Players may hold more than one non-FIFA nationality.

No.	Pos.	Nation	Player
4	DF	HUN	Sándor Hidvégi (from MTK)
6	DF	SRB	Dušan Vasiljević (from Újpest)
10	MF	SWE	Bojan Đorđić (From (Sweden) AIK)
13	MF	SWE	Martin Kayongo-Mutumba (From (Sweden) AIK)
16	MF	HUN	András Gosztonyi (from MTK)
22	GK	MNE	Mladen Božović (from (Serbia) Partizan)
23	DF	HUN	Tamás Vaskó (from Újpest)
31	DF	HUN	Martin Izing (From Academy)
—	MF	HUN	Gábor Demjén (loan return from Újpest)
—	GK	HUN	Bence Somodi (from Kazincbarcika)
—	FW	HUN	Bence Elek (From Academy)

Out: Note: Flags indicate national team as defined under FIFA eligibility rules; some limited exceptions apply. Players may hold more than one non-FIFA nationality.

No.	Pos.	Nation	Player
10	MF	HUN	Zsolt Dvéri (retired)
—	MF	HUN	Tamás Sifter (to Paks)
—	FW	HUN	Illés Zsolt Sitku (Loan to Újpest)
—	DF	HUN	Gábor Horváth (Loan to (Netherlands) NAC Breda)
—	DF	HUN	Róbert Varga (To Zalaegerszeg)
—	FW	MNE	Goran Vujović (Loan to Kecskemét)
—	DF	HUN	Ádám Présinger (Loan to Vasas)
22	GK	SRB	Nenad Filipović (released)
29	FW	HUN	Balázs Farkas II (loan return to (Ukraine) Dynamo Kyiv)
—	DF	MNE	Milko Novaković (loan return to (Montenegro) Mogren)
—	DF	HUN	Gábor Kocsis (on loan to Siófok)

== Friendlies ==
19 June 2010	Barcsi	0–1	Videoton	Barcs
17:00 CEST (UTC+2)			Radović 57'	Stadium: BSC-pálya; Attendance: 300

22 June 2010	Videoton (Hungary)	0–2	(Slovakia) MŠK Žilina	Felcsút, Hungary
17:00 CEST (UTC+2)			Majtán 19'; Rilke 42'	Stadium: Felcsúti Sportkomplexum; Attendance: 100

24 June 2010	Anorthosis Famagusta (Cyprus)	2–0	(Hungary) Videoton	Windischgarsten, Austria
18:00 CEST (UTC+2)	Sotiriou 56'; Tofas 58'

26 June 2010	Slovan Bratislava (Slovakia)	1–0	(Hungary) Videoton	Windischgarsten, Austria
18:30 CEST (UTC+2)	Slovák 66'

28 June 2010	Videoton (Hungary)	3–3	(Romania) Internațional	Windischgarsten, Austria
18:00 CEST (UTC+2)	Horváth 55'; Vujovic 68', 90' (pen.)		Antohi 44'; Ciucur 54'; Stan 60'

30 June 2010	Videoton (Hungary)	0–0	(Austria) Ried	Windischgarsten, Austria
18:15 CEST (UTC+2)

1 July 2010	Videoton (Hungary)	9–1	Austria Salzburg	Windischgarsten, Austria
18:30 CEST (UTC+2)	Alves 2', 17', 26', 40' (pen.); Nikolić 9', 29'; Lázár 34'; Sitku 49' (pen.); Baracskai 80'		Asztalos 55'

3 July 2010	Videoton (Hungary)	3–2	(Romania) Universitatea Cluj	Gröbming, Austria
18:30 CEST (UTC+2)	Alves 3' (pen.), 42'; Nikolić 10'		Reinaldo 20'; Lemnaru 57'

10 July 2010	Videoton	1–0	Videoton II	Felcsút
09:30 CEST (UTC+2)	Vujovic			Stadium: Felcsúti Sportkomplexum

17 July 2010	Videoton	5–3	Újpest	Felcsút
10:00 CEST (UTC+2)	Szakály 12'; Lencse 42'; Vujovic 50', 57', 79'		Simek 73'; Rajczi 83'; Sitku 86'	Stadium: Felcsúti Sportkomplexum

28 July 2010	Dunajská Streda (Slovakia)	0–1	(Hungary) Videoton	Dunajská Streda, Slovakia
17:30 CEST (UTC+2)			Vujovic 2'	Stadium: DAC Stadion

== Competitions ==
=== Overview ===
Competition	First match	Last match	Starting round	Final position	Record							
Competition	First match	Last match	Starting round	Final position	Pld	W	D	L	GF	GA	GD	Win %
Nemzeti Bajnokság I	1 August 2010	22 May 2011	Matchday 1	Winners	30	18	7	5	59	20	+39	60.00
Magyar Kupa	2 November 2010	17 May 2011	Round of 32	Runners-up	8	6	1	1	22	7	+15	75.00
Ligakupa	19 February 2011	23 February 2011	Quarter-finals	Quarter-finals	2	0	2	0	1	1	+0	0.00
Szuperkupa	7 July 2010		Final	Runners-up	1	0	0	1	0	1	−1	0.00
UEFA Europa League	15 July 2010	22 July 2010	Second qualifying round	Second qualifying round	2	0	1	1	1	3	−2	0.00
Total					43	24	11	8	83	32	+51	55.81

Source: Competitions

=== Szuperkupa ===
7 July 2010 Final	Debrecen	1–0	Videoton	Debrecen
18:00 CEST (UTC+2)	Fodor (yellow card) 59'; Szakály 66'	Report	Horváth (yellow card) 49'; Lipták (yellow card) 88'	Stadium: Stadion Oláh Gábor Út; Attendance: 1,000

Debreceni:
GK	31	(Lithuania) Mindaugas Malinauskas
DF	24	(North Macedonia) Mirsad Mijadinoski
DF	21	(Hungary) Marcell Fodor	(yellow card) 59'
DF	16	(Hungary) Ádám Komlósi
DF	28	(Hungary) Zoltán Nagy
MF	77	(Hungary) Péter Czvitkovics
MF	30	(Hungary) Zoltán Kiss
MF	55	(Hungary) Péter Szakály	(substituted off) 86'
MF	2	(Cameroon) Mbengono Yannick	(substituted off) 57'
FW	27	(Hungary) Ádám Bódi	(substituted off) 90'
FW	39	(France) Adamo Coulibaly
Substitutes:
FW	11	(Hungary) Péter Kabát	(substituted on) 57'
MF	15	(Hungary) László Rezes	(substituted on) 86'
MF	33	(Hungary) József Varga	(substituted on) 90'
GK	87	(Hungary) István Verpecz
MF	6	(Honduras) Luis Ramos
DF	17	(Hungary) Mihály Korhut
FW	23	(Hungary) Péter Szilágyi
Manager:
(Hungary) András Herczeg

Videoton :
GK	22	(Montenegro) Mladen Božović
DF	2	(Serbia) Marko Andić
DF	3	(Hungary) Gábor Horváth	(yellow card) 49'
DF	20	(Hungary) Pál Lázár	(substituted off) 46'
DF	5	(Hungary) Zoltán Lipták	(yellow card) 88'
MF	11	(Hungary) György Sándor	(substituted off) 61'
MF	8	(Hungary) Attila Polonkai	(substituted off) 61'
MF	7	(Hungary) Dénes Szakály	(substituted off) 76'
MF	26	(Croatia) Damir Milanović	(substituted off) 46'
FW	21	(Brazil) Andre Alves
FW	17	(Hungary) Nemanja Nikolić
Substitutes:
MF	14	(Hungary) Balázs Farkas I	(substituted on) 46'
MF	30	(Hungary) Sándor Hidvégi	(substituted on) 46'
MF	10	(Sweden) Bojan Djordjic	(substituted on) 61'
MF	25	(Hungary) Ákos Elek	(substituted on) 61'
FW	19	(Hungary) László Lencse	(substituted on) 76'
GK	1	(Hungary) Zsolt Sebők
FW	9	(Hungary) Illés Zsolt Sitku
Manager:
(Hungary) György Mezey

=== Nemzeti Bajnokság I ===
==== League table ====
Pos	Team	Pld	W	D	L	GF	GA	GD	Pts	Qualification or relegation
1	Videoton (C)	30	18	7	5	59	29	+30	61	Qualification for Champions League second qualifying round
2	Paks	30	17	5	8	54	37	+17	56	Qualification for Europa League first qualifying round
3	Ferencváros	30	15	5	10	50	43	+7	50	Qualification for Europa League first qualifying round
4	ZTE	30	14	6	10	51	47	+4	48	
5	Debrecen	30	12	10	8	53	43	+10	46	

Source: soccerway.com
Rules for classification: 1st points; 2nd overall wins; 3rd goal difference; 4th goals scored
(C) Champions

==== Results summary ====
Overall								Home						Away					
Pld	W	D	L	GF	GA	GD	Pts	W	D	L	GF	GA	GD	W	D	L	GF	GA	GD
30	18	7	5	59	39	+20	61	12	2	1	33	22	+11	6	5	4	26	17	+9

Last updated: 28 April 2012.
Source: See Below

==== Results by round ====
Round	1	2	3	4	5	6	7	8	9	10	11	12	13	14	15	16	17	18	19	20	21	22	23	24	25	26	27	28	29	30
Ground	A	H	A	H	A	H	A	H	A	H	A	H	A	A	H	H	A	H	A	H	A	H	A	H	A	H	A	H	H	H
Result	D	W	W	D	L	W	W	W	W	W	W	L	W	D	W	W	D	W	W	W	D	W	L	W	L	D	D	W	W	L
Position	6	3	2	1	7	3	1	1	1	1	1	1	1	1	1	1	1	1	1	1	1	1	1	1	1	1	1	1	1	1

Source: See below
A = Away; H = Home; W = Win; D = Draw; L = Loss

==== Results ====
1 August 2010 1	Siófok	1–1	Videoton	Siófok
17:30 CEST (UTC+2)	Sowunmi 32'	Summary	Vujovic 62'	Stadium: Révesz Géza Stadion; Attendance: 5,000; Referee: Ádám Németh

8 August 2010 2	Videoton	3–0	Vasas	Székesfehérvár
20:00 CEST (UTC+2)	Alves 48'; Elek 50'; Vujovic 55'	Summary	Mileusnić (yellow card) 36' (yellow-red card) 60'	Stadium: Sóstói Stadion; Attendance: 3,456; Referee: János Takács

14 August 2010 3	MTK	0–3	Videoton	Budapest
17:30 CEST (UTC+2)		Summary	Alves 10', 50'; Vasiljević 63'	Stadium: Stadion Hidegkuti Nándor; Attendance: 1,200; Referee: Ferenc Bede

21 August 2010 4	Videoton	1–1	Ferencváros	Székesfehérvár
17:30 CEST (UTC+2)	Nikolić 63'	Summary	Andrezinho 22'; Rodenbücher (red card) 77'	Stadium: Sóstói Stadion; Attendance: 7,706; Referee: Fábián Mihály

29 August 2010 5	Debrecen	3–1	Videoton	Debrecen
19:00 CEST (UTC+2)	Czvitkovics; Mbengono 71'; Horváth 90' (o.g.)	Summary	Sándor 55'	Stadium: Stadion Oláh Gábor Út; Attendance: 5,500; Referee: Zoltán Iványi

12 September 2010 6	Videoton	3–1	Szolnok	Székesfehérvár
17:30 CEST (UTC+2)	Lipták 52'; Sándor 63'; Alves 76' (pen.)	Summary	Alex 41' (pen.); Mile (red card) 76'	Stadium: Sóstói Stadion; Attendance: 2,754; Referee: Gábor Oláh

28 September 2010 7	Zalaegerszeg	1–2	Videoton	Zalaegerszeg
19:00 CEST (UTC+2)	Varga 37'	Summary	Polonkai 28'; Alves 83'	Stadium: ZTE Arena; Attendance: 2,264; Referee: Péter Solymosi

24 September 2010 8	Videoton	3–1	Haladás	Székesfehérvár
17:00 CEST (UTC+2)	Alves 12', 60'; Gosztonyi 76'	Summary	Kenesei 51' (pen.)	Stadium: Sóstói Stadion; Attendance: 2,000; Referee: József Berger

1 October 2010 9	Pápa	1–2	Videoton	Pápa
17:00 CEST (UTC+2)	Heffler 54'	Summary	Elek 19'; Alves; Elek (red card) 90'	Stadium: Stadion Várkerti; Attendance: 2,000; Referee: János Takács

17 October 2010 10	Videoton	2–1	Paks	Székesfehérvár
17:30 CEST (UTC+2)	Gosztonyi 12'; Alves 43' (pen.)	Summary	Eger 86' (pen.)	Stadium: Sóstói Stadion; Attendance: 3,500; Referee: Sándor Andó-Szabó

23 October 2010 11	Kecskemét	2–4	Videoton	Kecskemét
15:00 CEST (UTC+2)	Nemedi 21' (pen.); Csordas 74'	Summary	Alves 27', 46'; Polonkai 61'; Nikolić 71'	Stadium: Széktói Stadion; Attendance: 5,000; Referee: Ferenc Bede

29 October 2010 12	Videoton	0–2	Honvéd	Székesfehérvár
19:00 CEST (UTC+2)		Summary	Danilo 52', 58'	Stadium: Sóstói Stadion; Attendance: 3,500; Referee: Viktor Kassai

6 November 2010 13	Kaposvár	1–4	Videoton	Kaposvár
15:00 CET (UTC+1)	Olah 76'; Zsok (red card) 89'	Summary	Alves 2' (pen.), 22'; Vasiljević 11'; Elek 66'	Stadium: Stadion Kaposvár Rákóczi; Attendance: 2,500; Referee: Sándor Andó-Szabó

12 November 2010 14	Győr	1–1	Videoton	Győr
19:00 CET (UTC+1)	Stanisic (red card) 53'; Ganugrava 86'; Feher (red card) 90'	Summary	Vaskó (yellow card) 52' (yellow-red card) 84'; Alves 90+2' (pen.)	Stadium: ETO Park; Attendance: 2,600; Referee: Ferenc Bede

21 November 2010 15	Videoton	1–0	Újpest	Székesfehérvár
17:30 CET (UTC+1)	Nikolić 78'	Summary		Stadium: Sóstói Stadion; Attendance: 5,145; Referee: Zsolt Szabó

27 November 2010 16	Videoton	2–0	Siófok	Székesfehérvár
15:00 CET (UTC+1)	Sándor 58'; Nikolić 61'	Summary		Stadium: Sóstói Stadion; Attendance: 2,300; Referee: Ádám Farkas

27 February 2011 17	Vasas	0–0	Videoton	Budapest
17:30 CET (UTC+1)	Arnaut (yellow card) 34' (yellow-red card) 60'	Summary		Stadium: Stadion Rudolf Illovszky; Attendance: 2,500; Referee: Fábián Mihály

5 March 2011 18	Videoton	2–1	MTK	Székesfehérvár
16:30 CET (UTC+1)	Alves 45' (pen.); Elek 78'	Summary	Frank 28'	Stadium: Sóstói Stadion; Attendance: 3,075; Referee: Sándor Andó-Szabó

12 March 2011 19	Ferencváros	0–5	Videoton	Budapest
19:30 CET (UTC+1)		Summary	Alves 27'; Vasiljević 34'; Lencse 51'; Andić 67'; Polonkai 79'	Stadium: Stadion Albert Flórián; Attendance: 10,000; Referee: Viktor Kassai

18 March 2011 20	Videoton	2–1	Debrecen	Székesfehérvár
19:00 CET (UTC+1)	Lencse 61'; Alves 72'	Summary	Coulibaly 65'	Stadium: Sóstói Stadion; Attendance: 4,858; Referee: Ádám Németh

2 April 2011 21	Szolnok	1–1	Videoton	Szolnok
15:00 CET (UTC+2)	Zsolnai 16'	Summary	Alves 35'	Stadium: Tiszaligeti Stadion; Attendance: 1,500; Referee: Gábor Oláh

8 April 2011 22	Videoton	3–0	Zalaegerszeg	Székesfehérvár
19:00 CET (UTC+2)	Vasiljević 72'; Alves 82' (pen.), 90+2'	Summary	Varga (yellow card) 36' (yellow-red card) 76'; Vlaszak (red card) 80'	Stadium: Sóstói Stadion; Attendance: 3,000; Referee: Zoltán Iványi

17 April 2011 23	Haladás	2–0	Videoton	Szombathely
16:30 CET (UTC+2)	Halmosi 78'; Kenesei 87'	Summary		Stadium: Rohonci úti Stadion; Attendance: 6,000; Referee: Péter Solymosi

23 April 2011 24	Videoton	4–0	Pápa	Székesfehérvár
15:00 CET (UTC+2)	Alves 70', 81'; Lencse 76'; Nikolić 88'	Summary		Stadium: Sóstói Stadion; Attendance: 4,000; Referee: József Berger

26 April 2011 25	Paks	1–0	Videoton	Paks
18:30 CET (UTC+2)	Bartha 5'	Summary		Stadium: Fehérvári úti Stadion; Attendance: 4,000; Referee: Zsolt Szabó

29 April 2011 26	Videoton	2–2	Kecskemét	Székesfehérvár
19:00 CET (UTC+2)	Nikolić 39'; Alves 45' (pen.)	Summary	Litsingi 17'; Ebala 42'	Stadium: Sóstói Stadion; Attendance: 3,000; Referee: István Vad

8 May 2011 27	Honvéd	2–2	Videoton	Budapest
17:30 CET (UTC+2)	Zelenka 31'; Ivancsics 42'	Summary	Alves 10'; Gosztonyi 13'	Stadium: Bozsik József Stadion; Attendance: 3,500; Referee: Sándor Andó-Szabó

11 May 2011 28	Videoton	3–1	Kaposvár	Székesfehérvár
19:00 CET (UTC+2)	Nikolić 34'; Polonkai 81'; Szakály 87'; Gosztonyi (yellow card) 53' (yellow-red card) 90'	Summary	Grumić 77'	Stadium: Sóstói Stadion; Attendance: 7,528; Referee: Gábor Oláh

14 May 2011 29	Videoton	2–1	Győr	Székesfehérvár
17:30 CET (UTC+2)	Nikolić 24'; Polonkai 26'; Lencse (red card) 60'	Summary	Dudas 73'; Ji-Paraná (yellow card) 72' (yellow-red card) 90+2'	Stadium: Sóstói Stadion; Attendance: 4,178; Referee: Ádam Németh

22 May 2011 30	Újpest	1–0	Videoton	Budapest
17:30 CET (UTC+2)	Ahjupera 14'	Summary		Stadium: Szusza Ferenc Stadium; Attendance: 4,000; Referee: Roland Veizer

=== Magyar Kupa ===
2 November 2010 Round of 32	Baja	2–4	Videoton	Baja
14:30 CET (UTC+1)	Frőhlich 7'; Szabó 21'	Report	Sándor 33'; Sebők (red card) 44'; Vasiljević 48'; Nikolić 50'; Lipták 73'	Stadium: Vasvári Pál utcai Stadion; Attendance: 800; Referee: Ádám Farkas

==== Round of 16 ====
9 November 2010 First leg	Videoton	3–0	Haladás	Székesfehérvár
18:00 CET (UTC+1)	Alves 60' (pen.); Vasiljević 72' (pen.); Elek 83'	Report		Stadium: Sóstói Stadion; Attendance: 1,040; Referee: Zoltán Iványi

2 March 2011 Second leg	Haladás	1–3 (1–6 agg.)	Videoton	Szombathely
16:00 CET (UTC+1)	Gyurján 44'	Report	Nikolić 37'; Vasiljević 52' (pen.); Lencse 68'	Stadium: Rohonci úti Stadion; Referee: Balázs Böcskei
Note: Videoton won 6–1 on aggregate.

==== Quarter-finals ====
9 March 2011 First leg	Honvéd	1–1	Videoton	Budapest
18:00 CET (UTC+1)	Zelenka 22'	Report	Nikolić 71'	Stadium: Bozsik József Stadion; Referee: Zsolt Szabó

15 March 2011 Second leg	Videoton	4–0 (5–1 agg.)	Honvéd	Székesfehérvár
18:00 CET (UTC+1)	Gosztonyi 3', 90'; Lencse 27', 80'	Report		Stadium: Sóstói Stadion; Attendance: 2,000; Referee: Zoltán Iványi
Note: Videoton won 5–1 on aggregate.

==== Semi-finals ====
20 April 2011 First leg	Kaposvár	0–1	Videoton	Kaposvár
18:00 CEST (UTC+2)		Report	Lipták 48'; B. Farkas I (red card) 72'	Stadium: Stadion Kaposvár Rákóczi; Attendance: 4,000; Referee: Fábian Mihály

4 May 2011 Second leg	Videoton	4–0 (5–1 agg.)	Kaposvár	Székesfehérvár
17:00 CEST (UTC+2)	Vasiljević 11', 56'; Vaskó 17'; Nikolić 90+2'	Report		Stadium: Sóstói Stadion; Attendance: 1,200; Referee: Péter Solymosi
Note: Videoton won 5–1 on aggregate.

==== Final ====
17 May 2011 Final	Kecskemét	3–2	Videoton	Budapest
19:00 CEST (UTC+2)	Foxi 2', 14', 80'; Tököli (yellow card) 65'; Litsingi (yellow card) 65'	Report	Polonkai (yellow card) 40'; Čukić 48' (o.g.); Nikolić 82'	Stadium: Stadium Puskás Ferenc; Attendance: 5,000; Referee: Zoltán Iványi

=== Ligakupa ===
==== Knockout phase ====
Videoton entered the competition in the quarter-finals as one of the teams competed in UEFA competitions.

===== Quarter-finals =====
19 February 2011 First leg	Videoton	1–1	Paks	Székesfehérvár
14:15 CET (UTC+1)	Alves 3'; Gosztonyi (yellow card) 23'; Lipták (yellow card) 39'	Report	Fiola (yellow card) 25'; Böde (yellow card) 57'; Kiss 81'; Nagy (yellow card) 83'; Sifter (red card) 89'	Stadium: Sóstói Stadion; Referee: József Berger

23 February 2011 Second leg	Paks	0–0 ((a) 1–1 agg.)	Videoton	Paks
18:00 CET (UTC+1)	Vári (yellow card) 19'; Tamási (yellow card) 28'; Szabó (yellow card) 75'	Report	Lázár (yellow card) 10'; Vaskó (yellow card) 45'	Stadium: Fehérvári úti Stadion; Referee: Szabolcs Szilasi
Note: 1–1 on aggregate. Paks won on away goals.

=== UEFA Europa League ===
15 July 2010 Second qualifying round 1st Leg	Videoton (Hungary)	1–1	(Slovenia) Maribor	ETO Park, Győr^{1}
20:30	Horváth 79'	Report	Mezga 30'	Attendance: 3,850; Referee: Viktor Shvetsov (Ukraine)

22 July 2010 Second qualifying round 2nd Leg	Maribor (Slovenia)	2–0 (3–1 agg.)	(Hungary) Videoton	Ljudski vrt, Maribor
20:30	Volaš 39', 80'	Report		Attendance: 6,700; Referee: Euan Norris (Scotland)

Notes

- Note 1: Played in Győr at ETO Park as Videoton's Stadion Sóstói did not meet UEFA criteria.

== Squad statistics ==
=== Appearances and goals ===
No.	Pos	Nat	Player	Total		OTP Bank Liga		Magyar Kupa		Ligakupa		Europa League	
No.	Pos	Nat	Player	Apps	Goals	Apps	Goals	Apps	Goals	Apps	Goals	Apps	Goals
1	GK	(Hungary) HUN	Zsolt Sebők	5	0	1+0	0	4+0	0	0+0	0	0+0	0
2	DF	(Serbia) SRB	Marko Andić	30	1	23+0	1	4+0	0	2+0	0	1+0	0
4	DF	(Hungary) HUN	Sándor Hidvégi	13	0	9+1	0	3+0	0	0+0	0	0+0	0
5	DF	(Hungary) HUN	Zoltán Lipták	39	3	28+0	1	7+0	2	2+0	0	2+0	0
6	MF	(Serbia) SRB	Dušan Vasiljević	37	9	16+11	4	6+2	5	0+2	0	0+0	0
7	MF	(Hungary) HUN	Dénes Szakály	21	1	2+13	1	4+1	0	0+1	0	0+0	0
8	MF	(Hungary) HUN	Attila Polonkai	35	5	18+6	5	4+3	0	2+0	0	2+0	0
10	MF	(Sweden) SWE	Bojan Djordjic	10	0	1+3	0	3+1	0	0+0	0	0+2	0
11	MF	(Hungary) HUN	György Sándor	39	4	27+2	3	5+1	1	2+0	0	2+0	0
12	GK	(Slovenia) SLO	Tomáš Tujvel	5	0	4+0	0	0+1	0	0+0	0	0+0	0
13	MF	(Sweden) SWE	Martin Kayongo-Mutumba	3	0	0+3	0	0+0	0	0+0	0	0+0	0
14	MF	(Hungary) HUN	Balázs Farkas I	27	0	12+8	0	2+1	0	0+2	0	2+0	0
15	MF	(Hungary) HUN	Dániel Nagy	24	0	16+3	0	2+1	0	0+2	0	0+0	0
16	FW	(Hungary) HUN	András Gosztonyi	34	5	13+10	3	5+2	2	2+0	0	2+0	0
17	FW	(Serbia) SRB	Nemanja Nikolić	35	13	9+15	8	5+2	5	2+0	0	0+2	0
19	FW	(Hungary) HUN	László Lencse	23	6	9+5	3	3+2	3	0+2	0	1+1	0
20	DF	(Hungary) HUN	Pál Lázár	37	0	27+0	0	7+0	0	2+0	0	1+0	0
21	FW	(Brazil) BRA	Andre Alves	38	26	28+1	24	4+1	1	2+0	1	2+0	0
22	GK	(Montenegro) MNE	Mladen Božović	33	0	25+0	0	4+0	0	2+0	0	2+0	0
23	DF	(Hungary) HUN	Tamás Vaskó	34	1	25+1	0	6+0	1	2+0	0	0+0	0
25	MF	(Hungary) HUN	Ákos Elek	33	5	25+1	4	3+0	1	2+0	0	2+0	0
26	MF	(Croatia) CRO	Damir Milanović	11	0	1+3	0	5+2	0	0+0	0	0+0	0
31	DF	(Hungary) HUN	Martin Izing	3	0	1+0	0	1+1	0	0+0	0	0+0	0
	FW	(Hungary) HUN	Ádám Gyurcsó	2	0	0+1	0	0+1	0	0+0	0	0+0	0
	FW	(Hungary) HUN	Bence Elek	1	0	0+0	0	0+1	0	0+0	0	0+0	0
Players who appeared for Videoton that left during the season:
3	DF	(Hungary) HUN	Gábor Horváth	7	1	5+0	0	0+0	0	0+0	0	2+0	1
18	FW	(Montenegro) MNE	Goran Vujovic	7	2	5+1	2	0+0	0	0+0	0	1+0	0

=== Top scorers ===
Place	Position	Nation	Number	Name	OTP Bank Liga	Magyar Kupa	Ligakupa	Europa League	Total
1	FW	(Brazil)	21	Andre Alves	24	1	1	0	26
2	FW	(Serbia)	17	Nemanja Nikolić	8	5	0	0	13
3	MF	(Serbia)	6	Dušan Vasiljević	4	5	0	0	9
4	FW	(Hungary)	19	László Lencse	3	3	0	0	6
5	MF	(Hungary)	8	Attila Polonkai	5	0	0	0	5
5	MF	(Hungary)	25	Ákos Elek	4	1	0	0	5
5	FW	(Hungary)	16	András Gosztonyi	3	2	0	0	5
8	MF	(Hungary)	11	György Sándor	3	1	0	0	4
9	DF	(Hungary)	5	Zoltán Lipták	1	2	0	0	3
10	FW	(Montenegro)	18	Goran Vujovic	2	0	0	0	2
11	DF	(Serbia)	2	Marko Andić	1	0	0	0	1
11	MF	(Hungary)	7	Dénes Szakály	1	0	0	0	1
11	DF	(Hungary)	23	Tamás Vaskó	0	1	0	0	1
11				Own goal	0	1	0	0	1
11	DF	(Hungary)	3	Gábor Horváth	0	0	0	1	1
				TOTALS	59	22	1	1	83

=== Disciplinary record ===
Number	Nation	Position	Name	OTP Bank Liga		Magyar Kupa		Ligakupa		Europa League		Total	
Number	Nation	Position	Name	Yellow card	Red card	Yellow card	Red card	Yellow card	Red card	Yellow card	Red card	Yellow card	Red card
1	(Hungary)	GK	Zsolt Sebők	0	0	0	1	0	0	0	0	0	1
2	(Serbia)	DF	Marko Andić	6	0	1	0	0	0	0	0	7	0
3	(Hungary)	DF	Gábor Horváth	3	0	0	0	0	0	1	0	4	0
4	(Hungary)	DF	Sándor Hidvégi	1	0	1	0	0	0	0	0	2	0
5	(Hungary)	DF	Zoltán Lipták	7	0	1	0	1	0	1	0	10	0
6	(Serbia)	MF	Dušan Vasiljević	0	0	1	0	0	0	0	0	1	0
7	(Hungary)	MF	Dénes Szakály	1	0	0	0	0	0	0	0	1	0
8	(Hungary)	MF	Attila Polonkai	3	0	1	0	0	0	0	0	4	0
10	(Sweden)	MF	Bojan Djordjic	0	0	1	0	0	0	1	0	2	0
11	(Hungary)	MF	György Sándor	4	0	0	0	0	0	0	0	4	0
14	(Hungary)	MF	Balázs Farkas I	2	0	1	1	0	0	0	0	3	1
15	(Hungary)	MF	Dániel Nagy	3	0	0	0	0	0	0	0	3	0
16	(Hungary)	FW	András Gosztonyi	4	1	1	0	1	0	0	0	6	1
17	(Serbia)	FW	Nemanja Nikolić	3	0	0	0	0	0	0	0	3	0
19	(Hungary)	FW	László Lencse	1	1	0	0	0	0	0	0	1	1
20	(Hungary)	DF	Pál Lázár	1	0	0	0	0	0	0	0	1	0
21	(Brazil)	FW	Andre Alves	3	0	0	0	0	0	1	0	4	0
22	(Montenegro)	GK	Mladen Božović	1	0	0	0	0	0	0	0	1	0
23	(Hungary)	DF	Tamás Vaskó	6	1	1	0	0	0	0	0	7	1
25	(Hungary)	MF	Ákos Elek	5	1	2	0	0	0	1	0	8	1
			TOTALS	54	4	11	2	2	0	5	0	72	6
