= Nenad Filipović =

Nenad Filipović may refer to:

- Nenad Filipović (racewalker) (born 1978), Serbian racewalker
- Nenad Filipović (footballer) (born 1987), Serbian footballer
