= Mladen Božović =

Montenegrin footballer

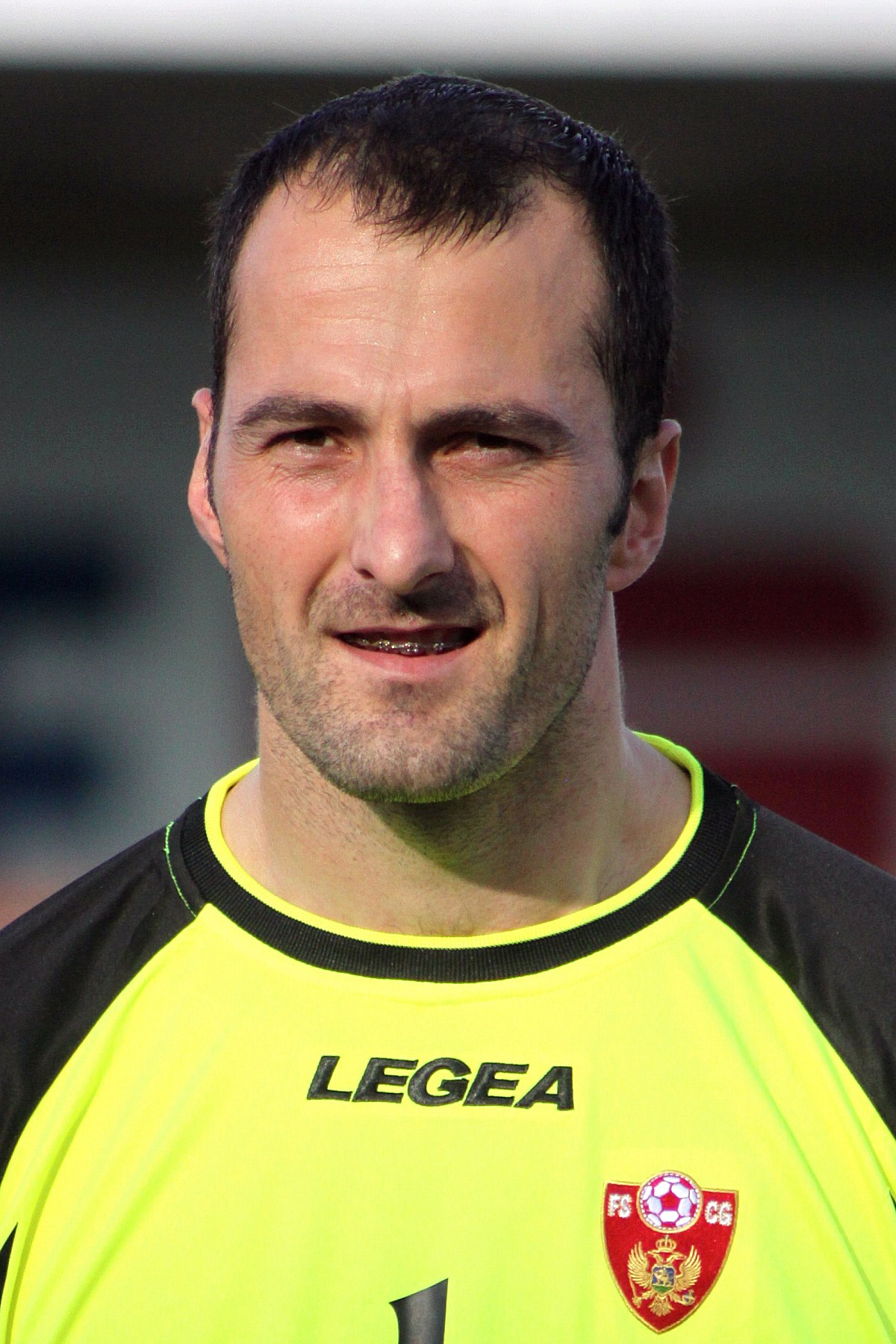
- Božović with Montenegro in 2014

Personal information
- Date of birth: 1 August 1984 (age 42)
- Place of birth: Titograd, SR Montenegro, SFR Yugoslavia
- Height: 1.97 m (6 ft 5 1/2 in)
- Position: Goalkeeper

Youth career
- 1993–2002: Zabjelo

Senior career*
Years	Team	Apps	(Gls)
2002–2003	Zabjelo	17	(0)
2003	Budućnost Dobanovci		
2004–2007	Budućnost Podgorica	57	(0)
2004	→ Mladost Podgorica (loan)	9	(0)
2005–2006	→ Kom (loan)	29	(0)
2008–2010	Partizan	68	(0)
2010–2013	Videoton	63	(0)
2013–2015	Tom Tomsk	8	(0)
2014	→ Khimik Dzerzhinsk (loan)	9	(0)
2016–2017	Zeta	48	(0)
2017–2018	Larissa	27	(0)
2020	Drezga		
2021	Zora		
2021	Zeta	5	(0)

International career
2007–2017	Montenegro	43	(0)
- * Club domestic league appearances and goals

Mladen Božović (Serbian Cyrillic: Младен Божовић, pronounced [mlâden bôːʒoʋitɕ]; born 1 August 1984) is a Montenegrin former professional footballer who played as a goalkeeper. Internationally, he earned over forty caps for the Montenegro national team.

== Club career ==
=== Beginnings ===
Light enough on his feet, and quick enough with his reflexes to dominate between the sticks, Božović started out with his local club Zabjelo, and joined Budućnost Podgorica in the 2004 winter transfer window. He was later loaned to Mladost Podgorica and Kom, before returning to the club and becoming the first-choice goalkeeper in the 2006–07 season.

=== Partizan ===
On 14 January 2008, Božović was transferred to Partizan, on a four-year deal. He made his competitive debut for the club in a 2–0 home league win over Bežanija on 22 March 2008, replacing his compatriot Darko Božović in the 87th minute of the game. Until the end of the 2007–08 season, Božović became the first-choice goalkeeper, as Partizan won the double.

He played the full 90 minutes in all of his team's league fixtures in the 2008–09 campaign. In April 2009, he first broke the club record (previously held by Ivica Kralj) in consecutive minutes without conceding a goal (840 minutes), after which he became the record holder in Serbian football after not conceding a goal for 916 consecutive minutes. The previous record holder was former FK Obilić goalkeeper Nenad Lukić who did not concede a goal for 903 consecutive minutes in the 1998–99 season. He was eventually named in the team of the season and also helped Partizan win the 2008–09 Serbian Cup, collecting the double for the second year in a row. He briefly lost his place in the team to Aleksandar Radosavljević between late September and early November 2009, before again becoming Partizan's undisputed first-choice goalkeeper. In May 2010, Božović celebrated his third Serbian championship title with the club.

During his tenure with Partizan, Božović played with the club twice in the UEFA Europa League group stage: in 2008–09 and 2009–10.

=== Later career ===
On 4 June 2010, Božović moved to Hungarian side Videoton. He was a regular starter in his debut season at Sóstói Stadion, helping the club win their first championship title ever. In the following two years, Božović added three more trophies to his collection, one Ligakupa and two Szuperkupa trophies (2011 and 2012).

On 23 June 2013, Božović joined Russian club Tom Tomsk on a free transfer. He was the first-choice goalkeeper at the beginning of the 2013–14 season, before losing his place in the starting lineup. In August 2014, Božović was loaned to Khimik Dzerzhinsk. He returned to the Siberian club in December 2014, making one league appearance until the end of the 2014–15 season.

In the 2016 winter transfer window, Božović returned to his homeland and signed with Zeta. He spent the next 18 months at the club, making 50 official appearances (league and cup).

On 20 June 2017, Božović moved to Greece and signed with AEL on a two-year deal.

== International career ==
On 3 June 2007, Božović made his international debut for Montenegro in a 0–1 loss to Colombia at the Kirin Cup. He then served as a backup goalkeeper for Vukašin Poleksić during the team's unsuccessful qualification campaign for the 2010 FIFA World Cup. Subsequently, Božović played the full 90 minutes in all of his team's UEFA Euro 2012 qualifying games, including a play-offs tie against the Czech Republic. However, Montenegro failed to reach the final tournament.

During the World Cup 2014 qualifying stage, Božović maintained his role as Montenegro's first-choice goalkeeper, appearing in eight games (out of 10), as the team finished in third place behind England and Ukraine.

In August 2016, Božović was called up to the national team after more than a year of absence. He helped Montenegro make a successful start of the World Cup 2018 qualifying phase, winning seven points in the first three games.

== Personal life ==
After his playing career ended, Božović began suffering from poverty and depression. On 8 March 2022, he attempted suicide but survived.

== Statistics ==
As of 20 June 2017

=== Club ===
Club	Season	League		Cup		League Cup		Super Cup		Continental		Total	
Club	Season	Apps	Goals	Apps	Goals	Apps	Goals	Apps	Goals	Apps	Goals	Apps	Goals
Zabjelo	2002–03	17	0	0	0	—		—		—		17	0
Budućnost Podgorica	2003–04	12	0	0	0	—		—		—		12	0
Budućnost Podgorica	2006–07	31	0	0	0	—		—		—		31	0
Budućnost Podgorica	2007–08	14	0	0	0	—		—		—		14	0
Budućnost Podgorica	Total	57	0	0	0	—		—		—		57	0
Partizan	2007–08	10	0	3	0	—		—		0	0	13	0
Partizan	2008–09	33	0	3	0	—		—		10	0	46	0
Partizan	2009–10	25	0	2	0	—		—		9	0	36	0
Partizan	Total	68	0	8	0	—		—		19	0	95	0
Videoton	2010–11	25	0	4	0	2	0	1	0	2	0	34	0
Videoton	2011–12	13	0	6	0	1	0	0	0	0	0	20	0
Videoton	2012–13	25	0	3	0	3	0	1	0	11	0	43	0
Videoton	Total	63	0	13	0	6	0	2	0	13	0	97	0
Tom Tomsk	2013–14	7	0	0	0	—		—		—		7	0
Khimik Dzerzhinsk (loan)	2014–15	9	0	1	0	—		—		—		10	0
Tom Tomsk	2014–15	1	0	0	0	—		—		—		1	0
Zeta	2015–16	16	0	0	0	—		—		—		16	0
Zeta	2016–17	32	0	2	0	—		—		—		34	0
Zeta	Total	48	0	2	0	—		—		—		50	0
Larissa	2017–18	27	0	0	0	—		—		—		27	0
Career total		297	0	24	0	6	0	2	0	32	0	361	0

=== International ===
National team	Year	Apps	Goals
Montenegro	2007	2	0
Montenegro	2008	3	0
Montenegro	2009	2	0
Montenegro	2010	8	0
Montenegro	2011	8	0
Montenegro	2012	7	0
Montenegro	2013	4	0
Montenegro	2014	3	0
Montenegro	2015	1	0
Montenegro	2016	4	0
Montenegro	2017	1	0
Total		43	0

== Honours ==
Budućnost Podgorica

- Second League of Serbia and Montenegro: 2003–04

Partizan

- Serbian SuperLiga: 2007–08, 2008–09, 2009–10
- Serbian Cup: 2007–08, 2008–09

Videoton

- Nemzeti Bajnokság I: 2010–11
- Ligakupa: 2011–12
- Szuperkupa: 2011, 2012

Individual

- Serbian SuperLiga Team of the Season: 2008–09
