= César Romero (footballer, born 1980) =

Brazilian footballer

Personal information
- Full name: César Romero Marques dos Santos
- Date of birth: 12 March 1980 (age 46)
- Place of birth: Apucarana, Brazil
- Height: 1.80 m (5 ft 11 in)
- Position: Midfielder

Team information
- Current team: Araxá

Senior career*
Years	Team	Apps	(Gls)
2001–2003	Paraná	20	(0)
2004–2005	Dinamo Tbilisi	7	(1)
2005–2007	Treze	2	(0)
2007–2009	Gorica	14	(1)
2008–2009	→ FC Fehérvár (loan)	9	(1)
2009–2010	Corinthians Paranaense		
2011	Rio Branco		
2011–2012	Cuiabá	26	(2)
2013–	Araxá		
- * Club domestic league appearances and goals as of 17 May 2013

César Romero Marques dos Santos (born 12 March 1980), known as just César Romero, is a Brazilian football player who currently plays for Araxá Esporte Clube.
