= Oleksandr Tkachuk =

Ukrainian footballer

Personal information
- Full name: Oleksandr Tkachuk
- Date of birth: 20 November 1985 (age 40)
- Place of birth: Chernivtsi, Ukrainian SSR, Soviet Union
- Height: 1.84 m (6 ft 0 in)
- Position: Midfielder

Youth career
- 1998–2002: RVUFK Kyiv

Senior career*
Years	Team	Apps	(Gls)
2002	Bukovyna Chernivtsi	11	(0)
2003	Lokomotiv Minsk	9	(0)
2004–2005	Tavriya Simferopol	0	(0)
2005	Kryvbas Kryvyi Rih	0	(0)
2005	→ Kryvbas-2 Kryvyi Rih	4	(0)
2006	Bukovyna Chernivtsi	4	(2)
2007	Olkom Melitopol	29	(0)
2008	Qizilqum Zarafshon	14	(3)
2009	Videoton	2	(0)
2009	Feniks-Illichovets Kalinine	13	(1)
2010	Al-Ittihad Aleppo		
2010	Zirka Kirovohrad	7	(0)
2011–2012	Karpaty Kolomyia		
- * Club domestic league appearances and goals

Oleksandr Tkachuk (born 20 November 1985) is a Ukrainian former professional football midfielder.

Tkachuk played for Lokomotiv Minsk in the 2003 Belarusian Premier League.
