= Dénes Szakály =

Hungarian footballer

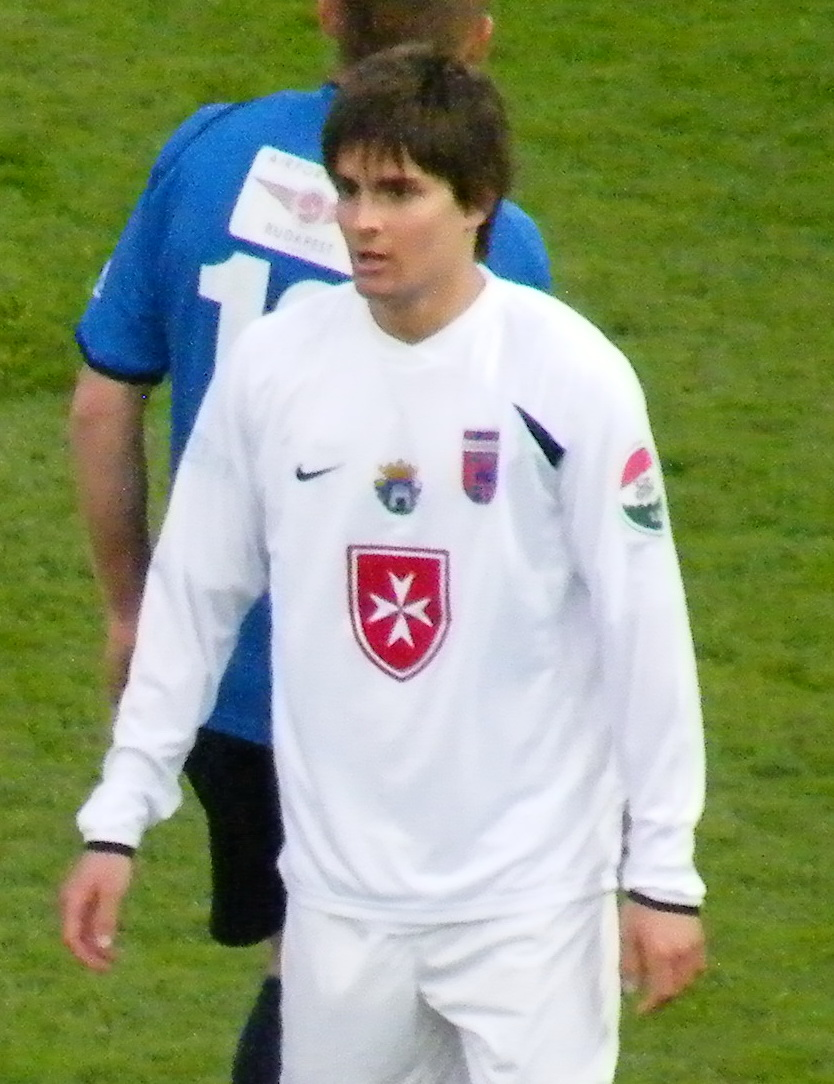
- Szakály playing for Videoton in 2010

Personal information
- Date of birth: 15 March 1988 (age 38)
- Place of birth: Nagyatád, Hungary
- Height: 1.79 m (5 ft 10 in)
- Position: Midfielder

Team information
- Current team: Csákvár
- Number: 10

Senior career*
Years	Team	Apps	(Gls)
2005–2009	Kaposvár	44	(1)
2009–2014	Videoton	55	(5)
2011–2012	→ Zalaegerszeg (loan)	21	(0)
2012–2014	→ Puskás Akadémia (loan)	39	(16)
2014–2015	Puskás Akadémia	21	(3)
2015–2018	Paks	69	(13)
2018–2019	Mezőkövesd	11	(0)
2019–2020	Siófok	31	(14)
2020–2021	Paks	35	(3)
2021–2022	Siófok	17	(1)
2022	MTK	7	(0)
2022–2023	Szeged-Csanád	32	(1)
2023–	Csákvár	63	(3)

International career
2009–2010	Hungary U-21	6	(0)
- * Club domestic league appearances and goals as of 31 May 2026

Dénes Szakály (born 15 March 1988) is a Hungarian football player who plays for Csákvár.

== Club career ==
On 3 January 2022, Szakály signed with MTK.

On 8 July 2022, he moved to Szeged-Csanád.

== Club statistics ==
As of match played 15 May 2021

Appearances and goals by club, season and competition
Club	Season	League			Cup		League Cup		Europe		Total	
Club	Season	Division	Apps	Goals	Apps	Goals	Apps	Goals	Apps	Goals	Apps	Goals
Kaposvár	2006–07	Nemzeti Bajnokság I	18	0	2	0	–	–	–	–	20	0
Kaposvár	2007–08	Nemzeti Bajnokság I	21	1	4	1	8	0	–	–	33	2
Kaposvár	2008–09	Nemzeti Bajnokság I	5	0	0	0	4	0	–	–	9	0
Kaposvár	Total		44	1	6	1	12	0	0	0	72	2
Videoton	2008–09	Nemzeti Bajnokság I	14	2	0	0	6	0	–	–	20	2
Videoton	2009–10	Nemzeti Bajnokság I	25	2	5	1	9	2	–	–	39	5
Videoton	2010–11	Nemzeti Bajnokság I	15	1	5	0	1	0	0	0	21	1
Videoton	2011–12	Nemzeti Bajnokság I	1	0	1	0	1	0	0	0	3	0
Videoton	Total		55	5	11	1	17	2	0	0	83	8
Zalaegerszeg	2011–12	Nemzeti Bajnokság I	21	0	1	0	0	0	–	–	22	0
Puskás Akadémia	2012–13	Nemzeti Bajnokság II	25	13	0	0	–	–	–	–	25	13
Puskás Akadémia	2013–14	Nemzeti Bajnokság I	14	3	0	0	4	0	–	–	18	3
Puskás Akadémia	2014–15	Nemzeti Bajnokság I	21	3	2	0	4	1	–	–	27	4
Puskás Akadémia	Total		60	19	2	0	8	1	0	0	70	20
Paks	2015–16	Nemzeti Bajnokság I	25	5	0	0	–	–	–	–	25	5
Paks	2016–17	Nemzeti Bajnokság I	24	4	2	0	–	–	–	–	26	4
Paks	2017–18	Nemzeti Bajnokság I	20	4	3	2	–	–	–	–	23	6
Paks	2019–20	Nemzeti Bajnokság I	16	0	2	0	–	–	–	–	18	0
Paks	2020–21	Nemzeti Bajnokság I	19	3	3	2	–	–	–	–	22	5
Paks	Total		104	16	10	4	0	0	0	0	114	20
Mezőkövesd	2018–19	Nemzeti Bajnokság I	10	0	3	2	–	–	–	–	13	2
Siófok	2018–19	Nemzeti Bajnokság II	11	6	0	0	–	–	–	–	11	6
Siófok	2019–20	Nemzeti Bajnokság II	20	8	0	0	–	–	–	–	20	8
Siófok	Total		31	14	0	0	0	0	0	0	31	14
Career total			325	55	33	8	37	3	0	0	405	66

== Personal life ==
His brother, Péter Szakály, is also a footballer.
