= Ilija Radović =

Montenegrin footballer

Personal information
- Date of birth: 9 May 1985 (age 41)
- Place of birth: Nikšić, SFR Yugoslavia
- Height: 1.87 m (6 ft 2 in)
- Position: Defender

Senior career*
Years	Team	Apps	(Gls)
2003–2007	Sutjeska Nikšić		
2004	→ Čelik Nikšić (loan)	13	(2)
2008	Vojvodina	10	(1)
2008–2010	Videoton	19	(3)
2010–2011	Budućnost Podgorica	13	(0)
2011–2012	Sutjeska Nikšić	15	(1)
2012–2013	Čelik Nikšić	23	(2)
2013–2014	Spartak Subotica	37	(1)
2014–2015	Napredak Kruševac	5	(0)
2015	Bačka	10	(2)
2016	Petrovac	17	(0)
2016–2018	Mornar	36	(2)
- * Club domestic league appearances and goals as of 31 October 2015

Ilija Radović (Cyrillic: Илија Радовић; born 9 May 1985) is a Montenegrin footballer who played as a defender.

== Club career ==
At the beginning of his career he was playing with hometown clubs FK Sutjeska Nikšić and FK Čelik Nikšić. His next club was FK Vojvodina where he was playing with this club in the Serbian Super Liga during the second half of the 2007–08 season. In summer 2008, he joined Hungarian side Videoton FC and played with them in the Hungarian top league in the 2008–09 and 2009–10 seasons. In summer 2010, he returned to Montenegro and signed a contract with FK Budućnost Podgorica, but the following season he rejoined his former club Sutjeska. During the winter break of the 2011–12 season, he moved to his also former club Čelik where he played with them in the following two seasons in the UEFA Europa League qualifiers and scored a goal in a match against Budapest Honvéd FC. In the 2013–14 season he moved abroad again, this time by joining Serbian Super Liga side FK Spartak Subotica. During the season 2014–15 he was part of FK Napredak Kruševac. From Napredak he went to OFK Bačka where he spent the 2015–16 season. After a couple of years spent in Serbia, he again moved to his land of birth Montenegro and signed a contract with FK Petrovac.

== Honours ==
- Nemzeti Bajnokság I, Runner-up: 1

2010

- Montenegrin First League, Runner-up: 1

2011

- Montenegrin Second League: 1

2012

- Montenegrin Cup: 1

2012

- Montenegrin Cup, Runner-up: 1

2013
