= Gábor Horváth (footballer, born 1985) =

Hungarian footballer

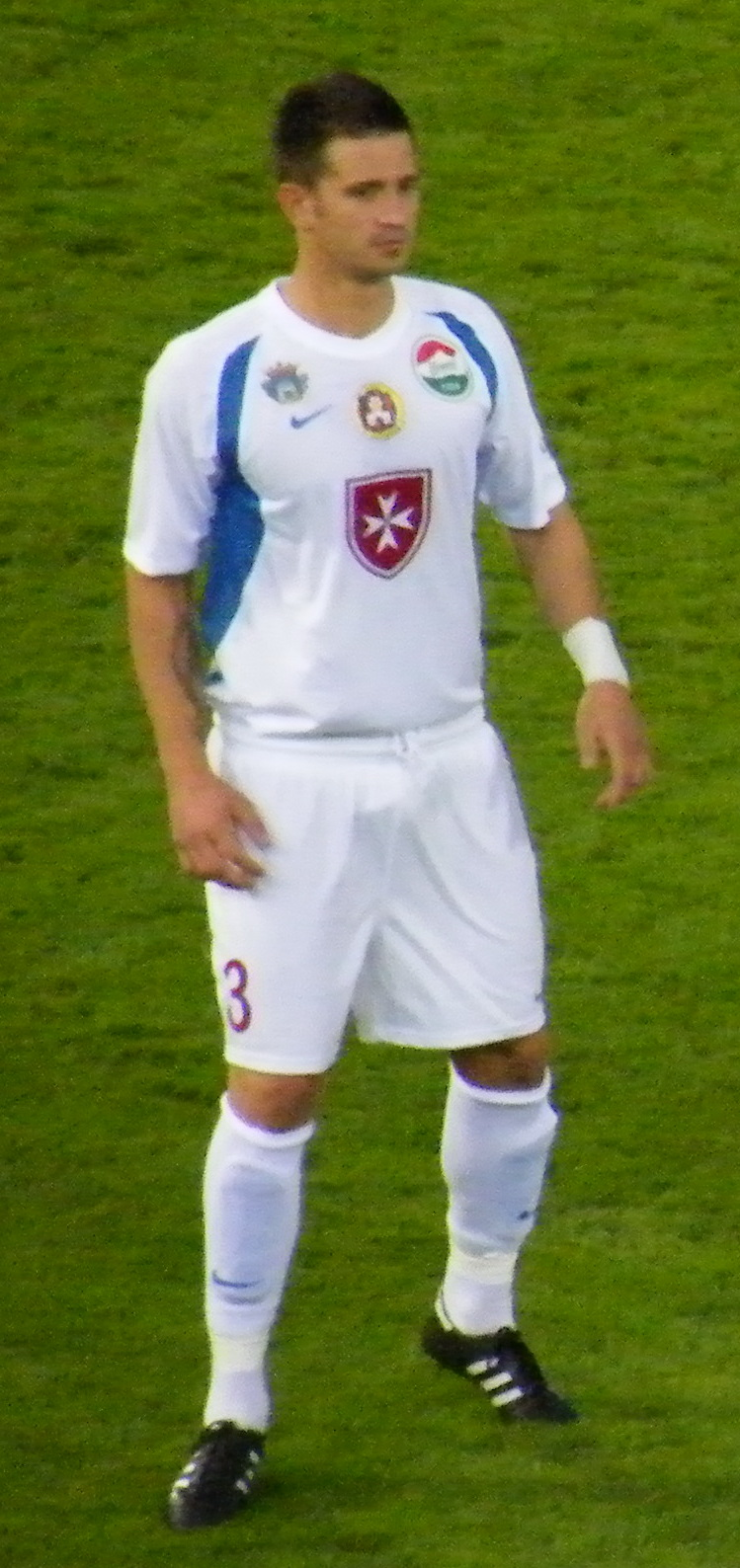

Personal information
- Date of birth: 4 July 1985 (age 41)
- Place of birth: Székesfehérvár, Hungary
- Height: 1.87 m (6 ft 2 in)
- Position: Centre back

Senior career*
Years	Team	Apps	(Gls)
2002–2011	Videoton	141	(4)
2010–2011	→ NAC Breda (loan)	19	(0)
2011–2013	ADO Den Haag	26	(1)
2013–2014	Paks	14	(0)

International career^{‡}
1999–2000	Hungary U-16	15	(3)
2005	Hungary U-20	1	(1)
2006	Hungary U-21	2	(0)
2009–2010	Hungary	4	(0)
- * Club domestic league appearances and goals as of 5 August 2015 ‡ National team caps and goals as of 5 August 2015

Gábor Horváth (born 4 July 1985) is a retired Hungarian football player.

== Career statistics ==
Season	Club	Country	Competition	Matches	Goals
2002–03	Videoton	Hungary	NB1	2	0
2003–04	Videoton	Hungary	NB1	11	0
2004–05	Videoton	Hungary	NB1	16	0
2005–06	Videoton	Hungary	NB1	13	0
2006–07	Videoton	Hungary	NB1	12	1
2007–08	Videoton	Hungary	NB1	24	1
2008–09	Videoton	Hungary	NB1	22	1
2009–10	Videoton	Hungary	NB1	29	1
2010–11	Videoton	Hungary	NB1	5	0
2010–11	NAC Breda	Netherlands	ERE	19	0
2011–12	Videoton	Hungary	NB1	7	0
2011–12	ADO Den Haag	Netherlands	ERE	23	1
2012–13	ADO Den Haag	Netherlands	ERE	3	0
2013–14	Paks	Hungary	NB1	14	0
			Total	200	5

=== International statistics ===
Updated 13 August 2009

International appearances and goals
#	Date	Venue	Opponent	Result	Goal	Assist	Competition
2009–10
1.	14 November 2009	Ghent, Belgium	Belgium	0–3	0	0	Friendly
2.	3 March 2010	Budapest, Hungary	Russia	1–1	0	0	Friendly
3.	29 May 2010	Budapest, Hungary	Germany	0–3	0	0	Friendly
4.	6 June 2010	Amsterdam, Netherlands	Netherlands	1–6	0	0	Friendly

National team	Club	Season	Apps	Goals
Hungary	Videoton	2009–10	4	0
Total			4	0

== Honours ==
- Hungarian Player of the Year: 2009–10
