= Zsolt Sebők =

Hungarian footballer

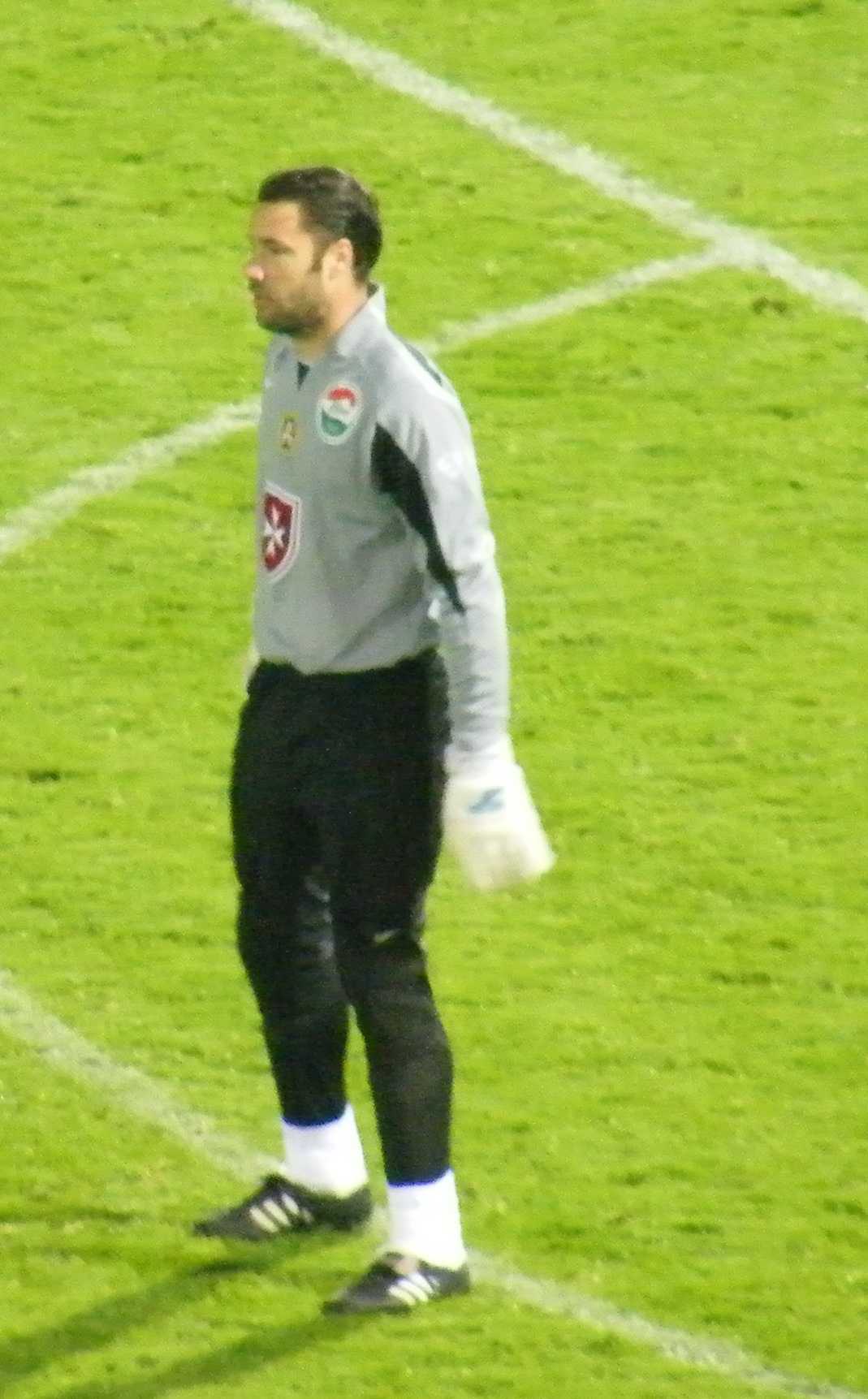

Personal information
- Full name: Zsolt Ervin Sebők
- Date of birth: 3 April 1979 (age 47)
- Place of birth: Győr, Hungary
- Height: 1.85 m (6 ft 1 in)
- Position: Goalkeeper

Senior career*
Years	Team	Apps	(Gls)
1999–2004	Győri ETO FC	79	(0)
2004–2011	Videoton FC	128	(0)
2011–2014	AEP Paphos	38	(0)
2014–2015	Pafos FC	18	(0)
2015–2018	Gyirmót SE	66	(0)
- * Club domestic league appearances and goals as of 1 August 2018

Zsolt Sebők (born 3 April 1979) is a retired Hungarian football goalkeeper. He formerly played for Győri ETO FC and Videoton FC.
