= Pál Lázár =

Hungarian footballer

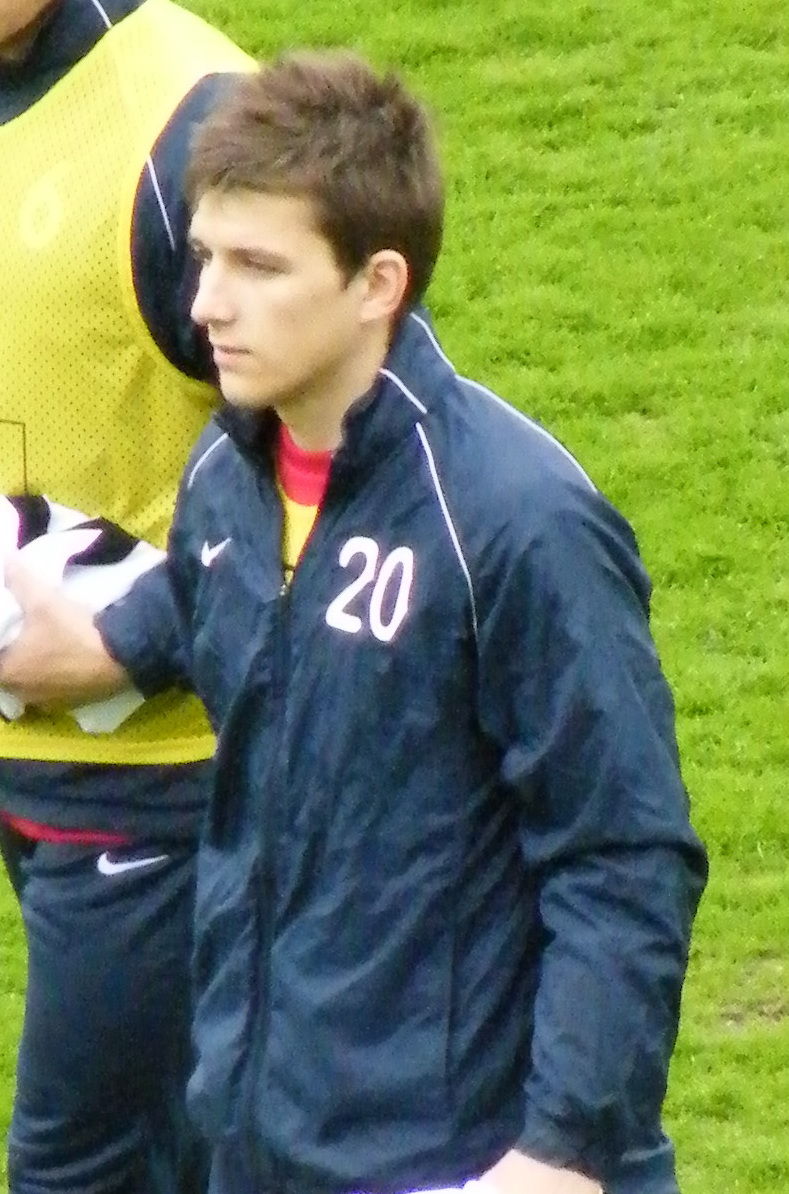

Personal information
- Date of birth: 11 March 1988 (age 38)
- Place of birth: Debrecen, Hungary
- Height: 1.84 m (6 ft 0 in)
- Position: Right back

Senior career*
Years	Team	Apps	(Gls)
2006–2007	Sopron	9	(0)
2007	Liberty Salonta	?	(?)
2007–2011	Videoton	71	(0)
2009–2010	→ Videoton II	2	(0)
2011–2012	Samsunspor	10	(0)
2012–2013	Pécs	8	(1)
2013–2016	Debrecen	56	(2)
2016–2017	Diósgyőr	12	(0)
2017–2018	Mezőkövesd	18	(1)

International career
2009–2010	Hungary U-21	6	(0)
2010–2011	Hungary	6	(0)
- * Club domestic league appearances and goals

Pál Lázár (born 11 March 1988) is a Hungarian former footballer who played as a right back.

== Career statistics ==
=== Club ===
Appearances and goals by club, season and competition
Club	Season	League			Cup		League Cup		Europe		Total	
Club	Season	Division	Apps	Goals	Apps	Goals	Apps	Goals	Apps	Goals	Apps	Goals
Sopron	2006–07	Nemzeti Bajnokság I	9	0	0	0	—		—		9	0
Videoton	2007–08	Nemzeti Bajnokság I	11	0	2	0	2	0	—		15	0
Videoton	2008–09	Nemzeti Bajnokság I	20	0	3	0	10	0	—		33	0
Videoton	2009–10	Nemzeti Bajnokság I	13	0	3	0	8	0	—		24	0
Videoton	2010–11	Nemzeti Bajnokság I	27	0	7	0	2	0	1	0	37	0
Videoton	Total		71	0	15	0	22	0	1	0	109	0
Samsunspor	2011–12	Süper Lig	10	0	1	0	—		—		11	0
Pécs	2012–13	Nemzeti Bajnokság I	8	1	0	0	2	0	—		10	1
Debrecen	2013–14	Nemzeti Bajnokság I	24	1	2	0	0	0	0	0	26	1
Debrecen	2014–15	Nemzeti Bajnokság I	16	1	3	0	5	0	1	0	25	1
Debrecen	2015–16	Nemzeti Bajnokság I	16	0	4	0	—		0	0	20	0
Debrecen	Total		56	2	9	0	5	0	1	0	71	2
Diósgyőr	2016–17	Nemzeti Bajnokság I	12	0	1	0	—		—		13	0
Mezőkövesd	2017–18	Nemzeti Bajnokság I	18	1	0	0	—		—		18	1
Career total			184	4	26	0	29	0	2	0	241	4

=== International ===
Appearances and goals by national team and year
National team	Year	Apps	Goals
Hungary	2010	3	0
Hungary	2011	3	0
Total		6	0
