= Tamás Sifter =

Hungarian footballer

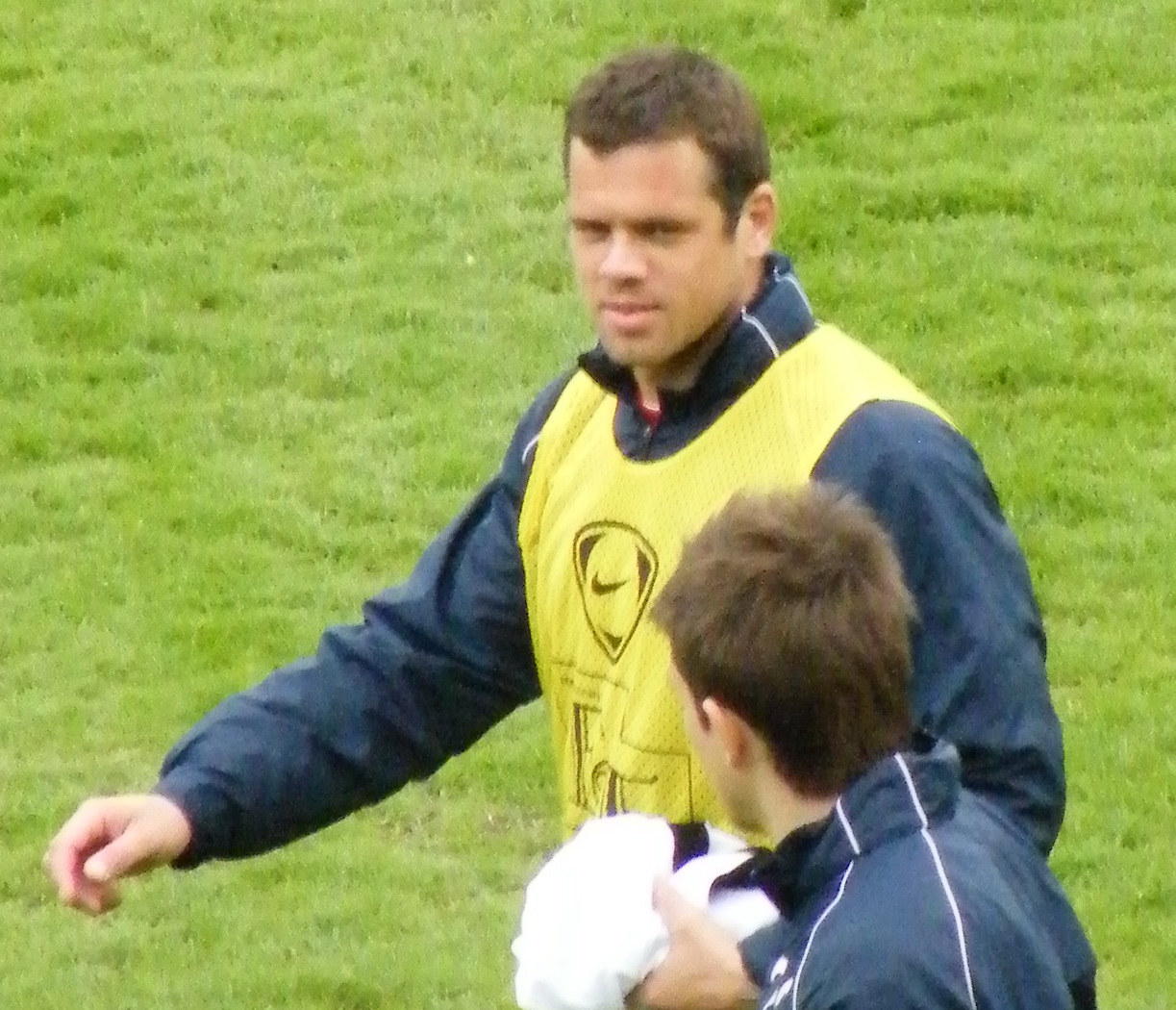
- Sifter in the 2010

Personal information
- Full name: Tamás Sifter
- Date of birth: 1 March 1983 (age 43)
- Place of birth: Sopron, Hungary
- Height: 1.84 m (6 ft 1/2 in)
- Position: Defender

Team information
- Current team: Sopron
- Number: 11

Youth career
- 1992–1998: Soproni FAC
- 1998–2002: FC Sopron

Senior career*
Years	Team	Apps	(Gls)
2002–2008	Sopron	91	(5)
2008–2010	Videoton	33	(0)
2010–2013	Paks	77	(4)
2013–	Sopron	86	(5)
- * Club domestic league appearances and goals as of 23 April 2017

Tamás Sifter (born 1 March 1983 in Sopron) is a Hungarian football player who currently plays for Soproni VSE.
