= Marko Anđić =

Serbian footballer

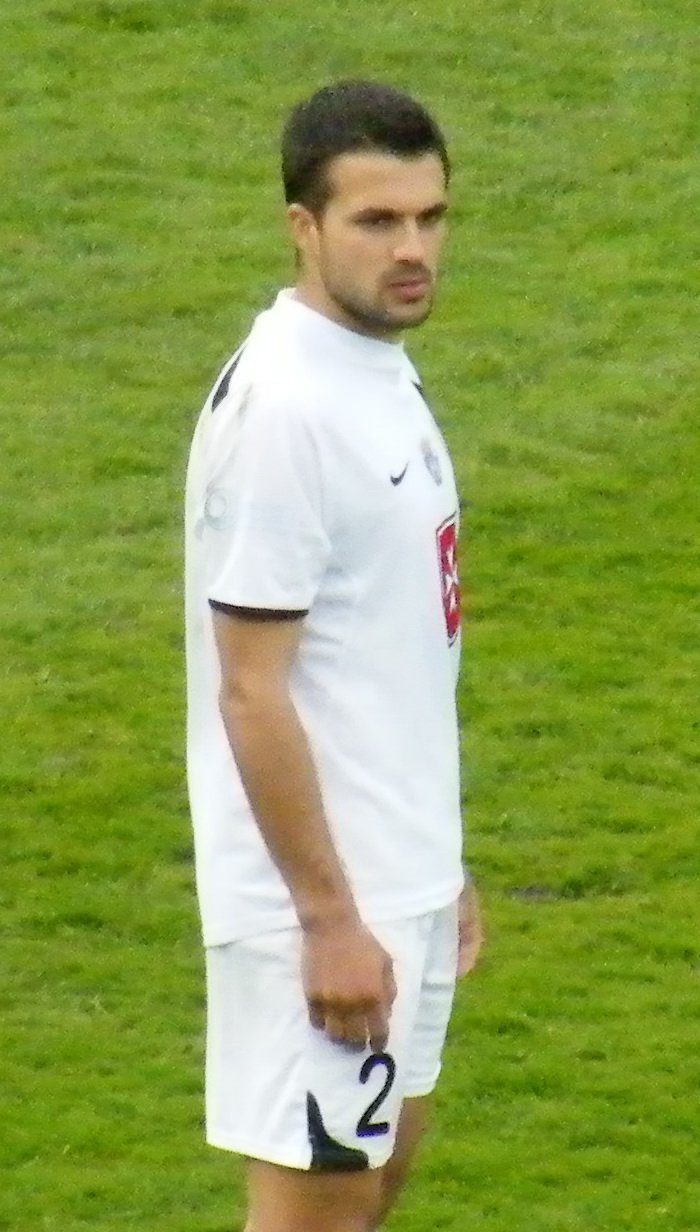

Personal information
- Full name: Marko Anđić
- Date of birth: 14 December 1983 (age 42)
- Place of birth: Požega, SFR Yugoslavia
- Height: 1.80 m (5 ft 11 in)
- Position: Full-back

Team information
- Current team: FK Lokomotiva Subotica

Youth career
- Sloga Požega

Senior career*
Years	Team	Apps	(Gls)
2003–2005	Sevojno	28	(6)
2005–2007	Lierse	53	(3)
2007	Lokeren	3	(0)
2008	→ Molenbeek (loan)	12	(0)
2008–2011	Videoton	53	(4)
2011–2015	Anorthosis	90	(1)
2015–2016	Nea Salamina	20	(0)
2016–2017	Spartak Subotica	18	(0)
2017–2019	Metalac Gornji Milanovac	43	(9)
2019	Zvijezda 09	10	(1)
2019–2020	Bačka 1901		
2020	Radnički Sombor		
2021–2023	Bačka 1901		
2024–current	Lokomotiva Subotica	19	(8)
- * Club domestic league appearances and goals as of 13:33, 14 February 2021 (UTC)

Marko Andić (Serbian Cyrillic: Марко Анђић; born 14 December 1983) is a Serbian footballer who plays for FK Radnički Sombor. He can play as a defender either on the left or the right side.

== Career ==
Andić plays for Anorthosis Famagusta FC. He won 2010-11 Nemzeti Bajnokság I with Videoton FC. He previously played for F.C. Molenbeek Brussels Strombeek, on loan from K.S.C. Lokeren Oost-Vlaanderen, and Lierse in the Belgian First Division.
