= Goran Vujović =

Montenegrin footballer

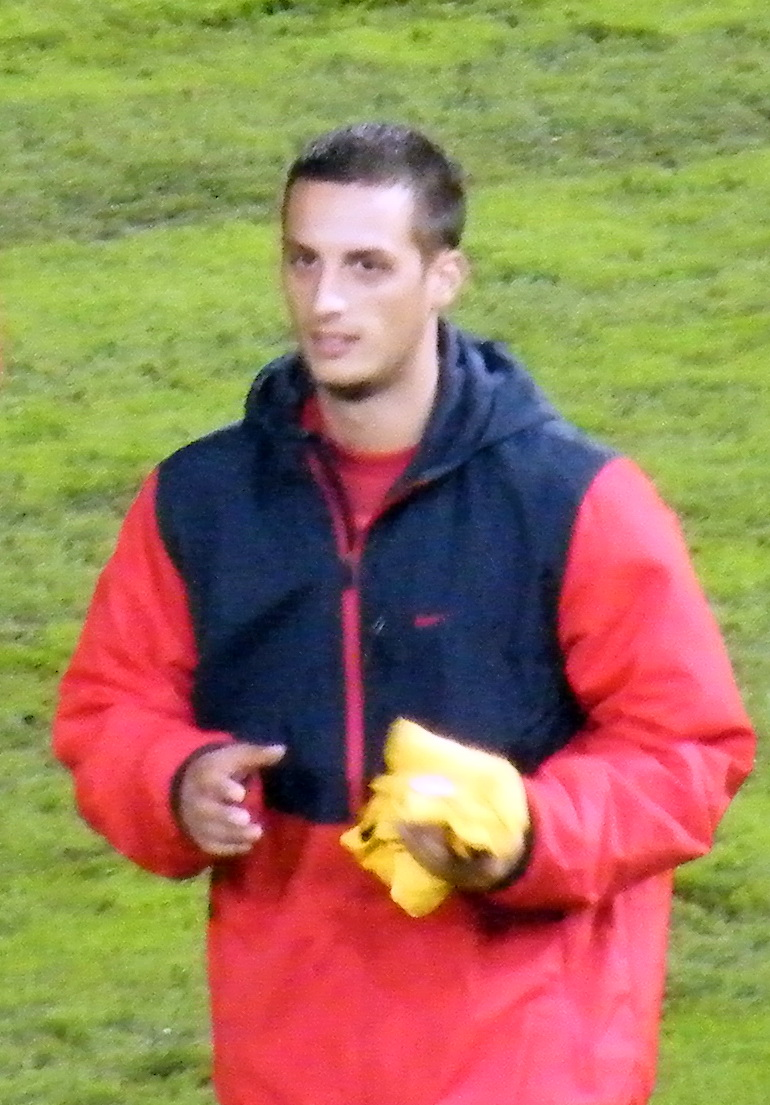
- Vujović with Videoton in 2010

Personal information
- Date of birth: 3 May 1987 (age 39)
- Place of birth: Cetinje, SR Montenegro, SFR Yugoslavia
- Height: 1.76 m (5 ft 9 in)
- Position: Forward

Senior career*
Years	Team	Apps	(Gls)
2005–2006	Teleoptik		
2006–2008	Banat Zrenjanin	35	(8)
2008–2012	Videoton	37	(13)
2011	→ Kecskemét (loan)	10	(2)
2011–2012	→ Haladás (loan)	13	(6)
2012	Egri	8	(0)
2013	Lovćen	14	(8)
2013	Mogren	15	(4)
2014–2015	Sutjeska Nikšić	47	(24)
2015–2016	Arsenal Tula	23	(3)
2016–2017	Budućnost	32	(12)
2017	Skënderbeu Korçë	0	(0)
2017–2019	Lovćen	48	(19)
2019–2020	Kom	23	(6)

International career
2007–2008	Montenegro U21	9	(1)
2009	Montenegro	1	(0)
- * Club domestic league appearances and goals as of 1 July 2020

Goran Vujović (Cyrillic: Горан Вујовић; born 3 May 1987) is a Montenegrin professional footballer who plays as forward.

== Club career ==
=== Early career ===
Vujović played with FK Teleoptik until 2006 when he signed with FK Banat Zrenjanin playing in the Serbian SuperLiga. He played with Banat for two seasons having made 35 league appearances and scored 8 goals.

=== Videoton ===
In summer 2008 Vujović moved to Hungary and signed with FC Fehérvár (who changed their name back to Videoton in 2009). After a solid first couple of seasons where he made 37 appearances with 12 goals in the Nemzeti Bajnokság I for the club, in January 2011 he was loaned to another Hungarian top league club, Kecskeméti TE, to help them win the 2010–11 Hungarian Cup although he did not play in the final as it was against his club, Fehérvár. In summer 2011 he was loaned to another club, Szombathelyi Haladás.

=== Mogren ===
In the summer 2013 transfer window, after having played a half-season with Lovćen returning from Hungarian football, Vujović joined Mogren. At the time he told a Montenegrin sports portal, CG fudbal, that he accepted Mogren's invitation and thought that Mogren was the best candidate to win the 2013–14 Montenegrin First League. However, by January 2014, Vujović sued Mogren at Montenegro's arbitrage court over unpaid salaries, and told newspaper "Dan" that in addition to not being able to pay salaries, that Mogren didn't even have enough money to fill the team bus with gas; he summarized his spell at Mogren as a "mistake in his career".

=== Sutjeska ===
On 24 January 2014, it was announced that Vujović joined Sutjeska Nikšić on a six-month contract. Even playing only a half-season, Vujović contributed to Sutjeska winning the 2013–14 Montenegrin First League with three league goals.

== International career ==
Vujović was a regular player of the Montenegro national under-21 football team during 2007 and 2008. On 6 June 2009, he made his debut for the Montenegro national football team in a match against Cyprus for the 2010 World Cup qualifiers. It remained his only international appearance.

== Honours ==
Videoton

- Hungarian Championship: 2010–11
- Hungarian League Cup: 2009

Kecskeméti TE

- Hungarian Cup: 2010–11

Sutjeska

- Montenegrin First League: 2013–14
