= Nenad Filipović (footballer) =

Serbian footballer

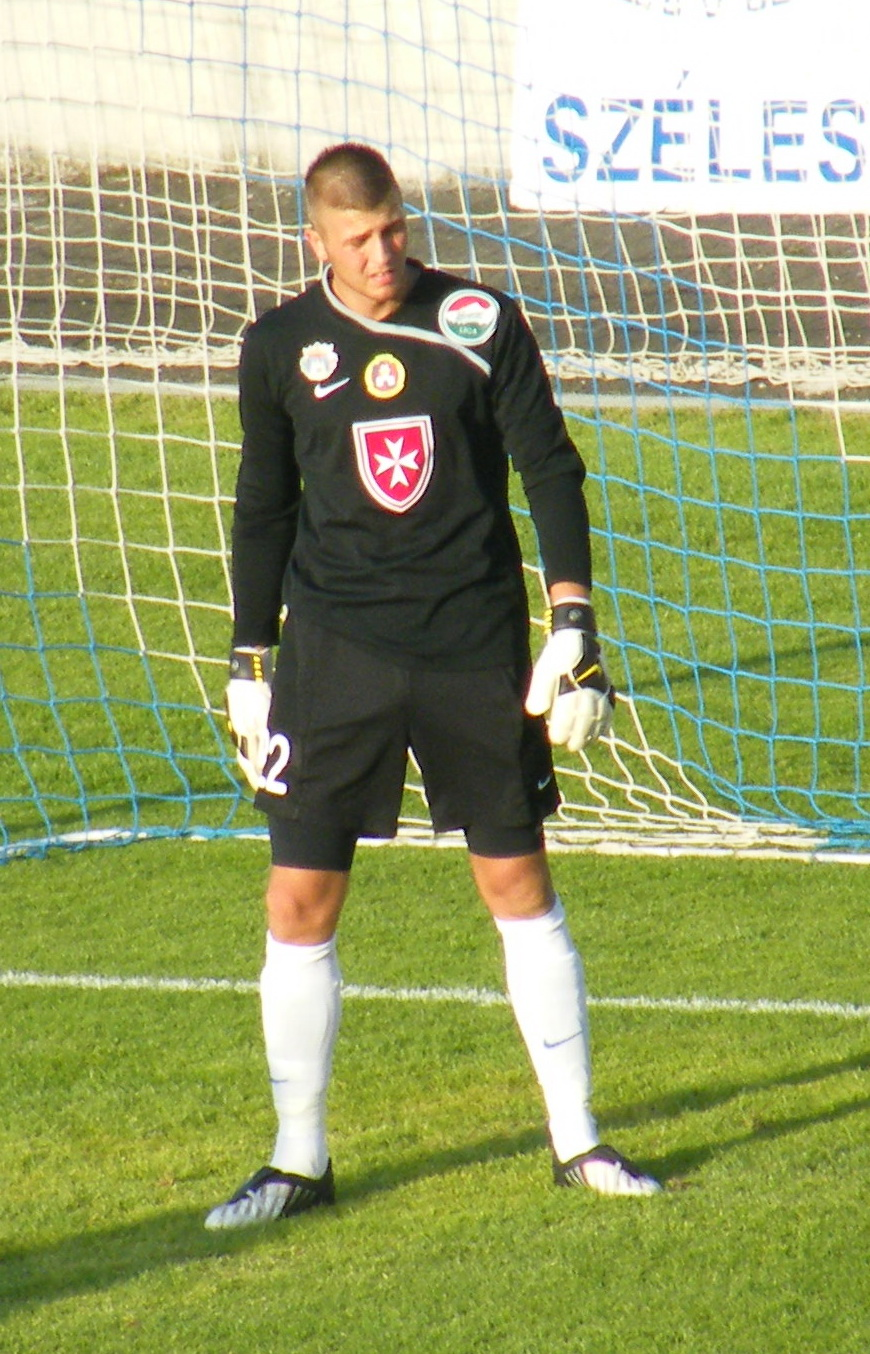

Personal information
- Full name: Nenad Filipović
- Date of birth: 24 April 1987 (age 39)
- Place of birth: Titovo Užice, SR Serbia, Yugoslavia
- Height: 1.91 m (6 ft 3 in)
- Position: Goalkeeper

Team information
- Current team: Voždovac
- Number: 84

Senior career*
Years	Team	Apps	(Gls)
2006–2008	Banat Zrenjanin	10	(0)
2008–2010	Videoton	1	(0)
2009	→ Videoton II	7	(0)
2010	MTK Budapest	9	(0)
2010–2011	Rad	0	(0)
2011–2012	Teleoptik	28	(0)
2012–2013	Etar 1924	9	(0)
2013–2015	Radnički Niš	18	(0)
2016–2017	Rad	25	(0)
2017–2018	Mačva Šabac	29	(0)
2018–2023	TSC	134	(0)
2023–2024	Čukarički	20	(0)
2024–	Voždovac	45	(0)
- * Club domestic league appearances and goals as of 14 May 2026

Nenad Filipović (Serbian Cyrillic: Ненад Филиповић; born 24 April 1987) is a Serbian footballer who plays as a goalkeeper for Voždovac.

== Career ==
On 14 April 2013, Filipović was dismissed circa 20 seconds after the start of Etar's match against CSKA Sofia for fouling an opponent and denying a goal scoring opportunity. He likely holds the record for the fastest sending off in A PFG's history.

== Personal life ==
Filipović's brother-in-law Milan Borjan is a fellow professional goalkeeper and Canadian international.
