= 2011–12 Rákospalotai EAC season =

Rákospalota
2011–12 season
- Owner: József Forgács
- Manager: János Mátyus
- Stadium: Budai II. László Stadion
- Nemzeti Bajnokság II (East): 15th (relegated)
- Magyar Kupa: Round of 64
- Top goalscorer: League: Zsolt Szabó (8); All: Zsolt Szabó (9)
- Highest home attendance: 500 (vs Kazincbarcika, 3 March 2012)
- Lowest home attendance: 200 (multiple league matches)
- Average home league attendance: 260
Home colours	Away colours

The 2011–12 season was Rákospalotai Egyetértés Atlétikai Club's or shortly REAC's 65th competitive season, 3rd consecutive season in the Nemzeti Bajnokság II and 99th year in existence as a football club. In addition to the domestic league, Rákospalota participated in this season's editions of the Magyar Kupa.

== First team squad ==
The players listed had league appearances and stayed until the end of the season.

Note: Flags indicate national team as defined under FIFA eligibility rules; some limited exceptions apply. Players may hold more than one non-FIFA nationality.

No.	Pos.	Nation	Player
1	GK	HUN	Péter Zoltán Tóth
2	DF	HUN	Balázs Dinka
4	MF	HUN	Csaba Ködöböcz
5	DF	HUN	Gergő Menyhért
6	MF	HUN	Máté Gulyás
7	DF	HUN	Gergő Cseri
9	FW	HUN	Patrik Czimmermann
10	FW	HUN	Zsolt Szabó
11	FW	HUN	Krisztián Nyerges
14	MF	HUN	Balázs Kovács
15	MF	HUN	Tamás Alm
15	FW	HUN	Péter Belényesi
15	FW	HUN	Máté Fézler
16	GK	HUN	Gellért Vajda
17	MF	HUN	Károly Kiss

No.	Pos.	Nation	Player
18	MF	HUN	Balázs Gáspár
19	DF	HUN	Tamás Tóvizi
20	MF	HUN	Attila Menyhárt
21	FW	HUN	Attila Tóth
22	FW	HUN	Zoltán Jovánczai
23	DF	HUN	Attila Kornis (loaned from MTK)
24	DF	HUN	Márkó Sós
25	MF	HUN	Balázs Olay
26	MF	HUN	Olivér Frideczky
27	FW	HUN	Péter Tóth
29	MF	HUN	Márton Göntér
30	MF	HUN	Károly Illés
31	GK	HUN	Roland Kunsági
32	FW	HUN	Bence Bacskai
33	MF	HUN	Zoltán Böőr

== Transfers ==
=== Transfers in ===
Date	Pos.	No.	Player	From	Ref
22 July 2011	GK	1	(Hungary) Dominik Csurgai	Újpest	
2 August 2011	FW	9	(Hungary) Patrik Czimmermann	Újpest	
2 August 2011	MF	17	(Hungary) Károly Kiss	Vecsés	
2 August 2011	MF	4	(Hungary) Csaba Ködöböcz	Tatabánya	
2 August 2011	GK	31	(Hungary) Roland Kunsági	Honvéd	
2 August 2011	DF	24	(Hungary) Márkó Sós	Honvéd	
2 August 2011	FW	10	(Hungary) Zsolt Szabó	Pápa	
31 August 2011	FW	27	(Hungary) Péter Tóth	Honvéd	
8 September 2011	GK	1	(Hungary) Viktor Szentpéteri	(Malta) Sliema Wanderers	
9 September 2011	MF	33	(Hungary) Zoltán Böőr	Újpest	
1 January 2012	FW	21	(Hungary) Attila Tóth	III. Kerület	
21 February 2012	DF	19	(Hungary) Tamás Tóvizi	Pilisvörösvár	

=== Transfers out ===
Date	Pos.	No.	Player	To	Ref
8 July 2011	GK	1	(Hungary) Csaba Somogyi	(England) Fulham	
15 July 2011	MF	23	(Hungary) Márk Bogdán	(Germany) Singen 04	
1 August 2011	MF	17	(Hungary) Richárd Gamal	Törökbálint	
3 August 2011	MF	15	(Hungary) Roland Dancs	(Austria) SV Zwentendorf	
4 August 2011	MF	25	(Hungary) Sándor Maczó	Csepel	
12 August 2011	FW	24	(Hungary) Kornél Bubori	Kiskundorozsma	
18 August 2011	MF	19	(Hungary) Márton Borsi	Nyíregyháza	
18 August 2011	FW	9	(Hungary) János Olasz	Eger	
22 August 2011	FW	10	(Hungary) Gábor Torma	Veresegyház	
20 February 2012	DF	3	(Hungary) Imre Hibó	Hatvan	
27 February 2012	DF	13	(Hungary) Martin Tímár	Szolnok	
16 March 2012	GK	1	(Hungary) Viktor Szentpéteri	(Finland) Lahti	

=== Loans in ===
Start date	End date	Pos.	No.	Player	From	Ref
1 July 2011	End of season	DF	23	(Hungary) Attila Kornis	MTK	
11 August 2011	31 December 2011	FW	21	(Hungary) Attila Tóth	III. Kerület	

=== Loans out ===
Start date	End date	Pos.	No.	Player	To	Ref
2 August 2011	31 December 2011	FW	9	(Hungary) Patrik Czimmermann	Budafok	
31 August 2011	31 December 2011	GK	16	(Hungary) Gellért Vajda	Dunakeszi	
23 January 2012	End of season	MF	8	(Hungary) Tamás Kiss	Vasas	

== Competitions ==
=== Overview ===
Competition	First match	Last match	Starting round	Final position	Record							
Competition	First match	Last match	Starting round	Final position	Pld	W	D	L	GF	GA	GD	Win %
Nemzeti Bajnokság II	21 August 2011	2 June 2012	Matchday 1	15th	30	8	7	15	44	61	−17	26.67
Magyar Kupa	14 August 2011	21 September 2011	Round of 128	Round of 64	2	1	0	1	3	4	−1	50.00
Total					32	9	7	16	47	65	−18	28.13

Source: Competitions

=== Nemzeti Bajnokság II ===
==== League table ====
Pos	Team	Pld	W	D	L	GF	GA	GD	Pts	Promotion or relegation
12	Szeged	30	10	7	13	46	43	+3	37	
13	Kazincbarcika	30	10	5	15	32	47	−15	35	
14	Budapest Honvéd II	30	9	7	14	36	44	−8	34	Relegation to Nemzeti Bajnokság III
15	Rákospalota (R)	30	8	7	15	44	61	−17	31	Relegation to Nemzeti Bajnokság III
16	Vecsés (R)	30	3	9	18	21	49	−28	17	Relegation to Nemzeti Bajnokság III

Source: soccerway.com
Rules for classification: 1st points; 2nd overall wins; 3rd goal difference; 4th goals scored
(R) Relegated

==== Results summary ====
Overall								Home						Away					
Pld	W	D	L	GF	GA	GD	Pts	W	D	L	GF	GA	GD	W	D	L	GF	GA	GD
30	8	7	15	44	61	−17	31	7	5	3	30	19	+11	1	2	12	14	42	−28

Source: HFF

==== Results by round ====
Round	1	2	3	4	5	6	7	8	9	10	11	12	13	14	15	16	17	18	19	20	21	22	23	24	25	26	27	28	29	30
Ground	H	A	H	A	H	A	H	A	H	A	H	A	H	H	A	A	H	A	H	A	H	A	H	A	H	A	H	A	A	H
Result	W	L	W	L	W	L	D	L	D	D	D	W	W	W	L	L	W	L	D	D	L	L	D	L	W	L	L	L	L	L
Position	3	8	6	6	6	6	6	8	10	9	9	8	8	7	7	8	6	7	7	7	8	10	10	12	12	12	14	15	15	15
Points	3	3	6	6	9	9	10	10	11	12	13	16	19	22	22	22	25	25	26	27	27	27	28	28	31	31	31	31	31	31

Source: Matches
A = Away; H = Home; W = Win; D = Draw; L = Loss

==== Matches ====
21 August 2011 1	Rákospalota	3–1	Újpest II	Budapest
17:30 CEST (UTC+2)	T. Kiss 37'; Menyhárt (yellow card) 45'; Z. Szabó 47', 57'	Report	Magos (yellow card) 35'; Széki (yellow card) 69'; Szalai (yellow card) 74'; D. Kocsis 79'; Á. Privigyei (yellow card) 90+3'	Stadium: Budai II. László Stadion; Attendance: 200; Referee: Gergely Szőts

27 August 2011 2	Kazincbarcika	1–0	Rákospalota	Kazincbarcika
17:30 CEST (UTC+2)	G. Tátrai (yellow card) 13'; Pasteur (yellow card) 15'; A. Bene 75', (yellow card) 76'	Report	Dinka (yellow card) 33'; T. Kiss (yellow card) 36'; Menyhért (yellow card) 80'; M. Gulyás (yellow card) 88'	Stadium: Pete András Stadion; Attendance: 300; Referee: János Takács

4 September 2011 3	Rákospalota	1–0	Honvéd II	Budapest
16:30 CEST (UTC+2)	T. Kiss 17'; B. Kovács (yellow card) 83'; M. Gulyás (yellow card) 89'	Report	Sekulić (yellow card) 20'; Kapacina (yellow card) 36'; Ivancsics (yellow card) 80'; M. Varga (yellow card) 87'	Stadium: Budai II. László Stadion; Attendance: 200; Referee: Dániel Becséri

10 September 2011 4	Cegléd	3–1	Rákospalota	Cegléd
16:30 CEST (UTC+2)	Odrobéna (red card) 36'; V. Buzás (yellow card) 52'; Balog (yellow card) 64'; Koncz 80' (pen.); M. Kurucsai 90'; Á. Markó 90+2'	Report	Menyhárt 62'; Böőr (red card) 68'; Jovánczai (red card) 69'; B. Kovács (red card) 82'; Cseri (yellow card) 85'	Stadium: Malomtó széli stadion Attendance: 400; Referee: Roland Veizer

18 September 2011 5	Rákospalota	3–0	Vecsés	Budapest
18:00 CEST (UTC+2)	P. Varga 48' (o.g.); K. Kiss (yellow card) 70'; Menyhért 87', (yellow card) 87'; T. Kiss 90+2'	Report	Z. Kovács (yellow card) 42'; P. Varga (yellow card) 55'; G. Piros (yellow card) 64'; S. Erdei (yellow card) 68'	Stadium: Budai II. László Stadion; Attendance: 250; Referee: Ádám Farkas

25 September 2011 6	Eger	1–0	Rákospalota	Eger
16:00 CEST (UTC+2)	D. Debreceni (yellow card) 10'; Á. Farkas 45'; Bíró (yellow card) 74'; J. Olasz (yellow card) 82'; Katona (yellow card) 83'	Report	Menyhárt (yellow card) 27'	Stadium: Szentmarjay Tibor Városi Stadion; Attendance: 300; Referee: János Takács

30 September 2011 7	Rákospalota	3–3	Debrecen II	Budapest
18:00 CEST (UTC+2)	P. Tóth 45', 65', (yellow card) 68'; T. Kiss (red card) 73'; Sós 90'	Report	Lucas 14', 36', (yellow card) 75'; Ludánszki (yellow card) 31'; Fodor (yellow card) 70'; N. Mokánszki 83'	Stadium: Budai II. László Stadion; Attendance: 300; Referee: István Mészáros

9 October 2011 8	Mezőkövesd	2–1	Rákospalota	Mezőkövesd
15:00 CEST (UTC+2)	Kornis 6' (o.g.); Á. Hamar (yellow card) 35'; Menyhért 51' (o.g.); Szántai (yellow card) 90'	Report	Sós (yellow card) 35'; Jovánczai (red card) 45'; Cseri (yellow card) 46'; Nyerges 69'	Stadium: Mezőkövesdi Városi Stadion; Attendance: 800; Referee: Gábor Oláh

16 October 2011 9	Rákospalota	2–2	Orosháza	Budapest
17:00 CEST (UTC+2)	Nyerges (yellow card) 12'; Sós 55'; P. Tóth 90+4'	Report	N. Juhász (yellow card) 4'; Futaki (yellow card) 38'; N. Szabó (yellow card) 44'; L. Ács 45'; C. Kerepeczki 51' (pen.); D. Szűcs (yellow card) 65'; N. Milenković (yellow card) 71'; I. M. Lupsa (red card) 76'; D. Bordás (yellow card) 90+2'; Petneházi (yellow card) 90+3'	Stadium: Budai II. László Stadion; Attendance: 200; Referee: Béla Botló

22 October 2011 10	Békéscsaba	1–1	Rákospalota	Békéscsaba
14:30 CEST (UTC+2)	Tchana 25', (yellow card) 77'; T. Fülöp (yellow card) 52'; Balázs (yellow card) 60'; M. Balogh (yellow card) 90'	Report	M. Gulyás (yellow card) 43'; Kornis (yellow card) 73'; Nyerges 90'	Stadium: Kórház utcai Stadion; Attendance: 800; Referee: Ádám Farkas

30 October 2011 11	Rákospalota	1–1	Nyíregyháza	Budapest
17:00 CET (UTC+1)	Cseri (yellow card) 36'; Jovánczai 60'	Report	Á. Kovács 10' (pen.), (yellow card) 53'; Radványi (yellow card) 74'	Stadium: Budai II. László Stadion; Attendance: 250; Referee: Szabolcs Szilasi

6 November 2011 12	Balmazújváros	2–3	Rákospalota	Balmazújváros
13:30 CET (UTC+1)	Á. Németh (yellow card) 50'; Ludánszki 59'; L. Szűcs (yellow card) 66'; F. Papp (yellow card) 67', (goal) 71'	Report	Z. Szabó 41'; Jovánczai (yellow card) 45', (goal) 90+2'; Kornis (yellow card) 78'; Böőr 81'; P. Tóth (yellow card) 90'	Stadium: Városi Sportpálya; Attendance: 1,000; Referee: László Varga

13 November 2011 13	Rákospalota	3–0	Vác	Budapest
15:00 CET (UTC+1)	Sós 2', 50'; T. Kiss 48'; M. Gulyás (yellow card) 55'; Ködöböcz (yellow card) 89'	Report	G. Gulyás (yellow card) 22'; Hegedűs (yellow card) 38'	Stadium: Budai II. László Stadion; Attendance: 300; Referee: József Berger

18 November 2011 14	Rákospalota	3–0	Szeged	Budapest
17:00 CET (UTC+1)	Z. Szabó 7', 65'; M. Gulyás 31'; T. Kiss (yellow card) 33'; Jovánczai (yellow card) 85'	Report	G. Radnai (red card) 30'; Z. Nagy (red card) 65'	Stadium: Budai II. László Stadion; Attendance: 200; Referee: Roland Veizer

26 November 2011 15	Szolnok	4–1	Rákospalota	Szolnok
13:00 CET (UTC+1)	Mundi 38', (yellow card) 55'; M. Ulvicki (yellow card) 45'; Vári 48'; A. Szeleczki (yellow card) 58'; Szepessy 61'; Menyhért 88' (o.g.)	Report	Z. Szabó 65'; Kornis (yellow card) 68'	Stadium: Tiszaligeti Stadion; Attendance: 400; Referee: Tamás Bognár

7 March 2012 16	Újpest II	3–1	Rákospalota	Budapest
14:00 CET (UTC+1)	B. Banai (yellow card) 49'; Lázár 59'; B. Balogh 77' (pen.); El Maestro 90'	Report	Jovánczai 63'; Z. Szabó (yellow card) 90+1'	Stadium: Szusza Ferenc Stadion; Attendance: 200; Referee: Dániel Becséri

3 March 2012 17	Rákospalota	4–1	Kazincbarcika	Budapest
13:00 CET (UTC+1)	Nyerges 2' (pen.); Kornis (yellow card) 25'; Jovánczai 54'; Z. Szabó 56'; Böőr 61'	Report	Horváth (yellow card) 1'; B. Fehér (yellow card) 23'; Halgas (yellow card) 45'; D. G. Mesa (yellow card) 46'; D. Nyisalovits 76'	Stadium: Budai II. László Stadion; Attendance: 500; Referee: Ádám Farkas

11 March 2012 18	Honvéd II	1–0	Rákospalota	Budapest
14:30 CET (UTC+1)	Faggyas (yellow card) 41'; Kornis 68' (o.g.)	Report		Stadium: Bozsik József Stadion; Attendance: 200; Referee: Dávid Ákos

17 March 2012 19	Rákospalota	1–1	Cegléd	Budapest
13:00 CET (UTC+1)	Jovánczai (yellow card) 42'; Kornis (yellow card) 67'; Sós (yellow card) 85'; K. Kiss 89'	Report	Rebryk 7'; I. Farkas (yellow card) 29'; V. Buzás (yellow card) 81'	Stadium: Budai II. László Stadion; Attendance: 200; Referee: Zoltán J. Kovács

24 March 2012 20	Vecsés	2–2	Rákospalota	Vecsés
15:00 CET (UTC+1)	D. S. Obot 37'; B. Szurkos 53'; D. Kollár (yellow card) 58'; C. Petruska (yellow card) 61'; B. Balázs (yellow card) 75'	Report	Jovánczai 5'; Sós 34', (yellow card) 55'; K. Kiss (yellow card) 84'	Stadium: Stadion Dózsa György út Attendance: 400; Referee: Péter Gábor Kovács

30 March 2012 21	Rákospalota	1–2	Eger	Budapest
17:00 CEST (UTC+2)	Kornis (yellow card) 21'; Jovánczai (yellow card) 33'; M. Gulyás (yellow card) 34'; Menyhárt 50'; Dinka (yellow card) 52'; Sós (yellow card) 75'; K. Illés (yellow card) 90+2'	Report	Preklet (yellow card) 43'; Pavičević (yellow card) 54'; Pavlov (yellow card) 69', (goal) 72', 83'; Á. Farkas (yellow card) 75'; T. Romhányi (yellow card) 87'	Stadium: Budai II. László Stadion; Attendance: 200; Referee: Tamás Berényi

8 April 2012 22	Debrecen II	3–0	Rákospalota	Debrecen
16:30 CEST (UTC+2)	Rezes 5'; J. Boros 15'; Salami (yellow card) 55'; M. Kovács (yellow card) 57'; A. Burics (yellow card) 73'; Szécsi 77'	Report	P. Z. Tóth (red card) 37'; Jovánczai (yellow card) 48'	Stadium: Dóczy József utcai Sportpálya; Attendance: 200; Referee: Ferenc Karakó

13 April 2012 23	Rákospalota	1–1	Mezőkövesd	Budapest
17:00 CEST (UTC+2)	Böőr 60'	Report	Jeremiás 25'; S. Sivák (yellow card) 41'; Lakatos (yellow card) 64'	Stadium: Budai II. László Stadion; Attendance: 200; Referee: László Varga

21 April 2012 24	Orosháza	3–0	Rákospalota	Orosháza
17:00 CEST (UTC+2)	N. Szabó (yellow card) 11'; T. Szabó (yellow card) 52'; D. Tóth 59'; L. Ács 84', 88'	Report	Böőr (yellow card) 22'	Stadium: Mátrai- Stadion; Attendance: 300; Referee: Mihály Fábián

27 April 2012 25	Rákospalota	1–0	Békéscsaba	Budapest
17:00 CEST (UTC+2)	P. Tóth 2'; M. Gulyás (yellow card) 37'; Sós (yellow card) 90'	Report	Majoros (yellow card) 12'; I. Kerekes (yellow card) 22'; Tchana (yellow card) 30'; Juhász (yellow card) 84'; Pozsár (red card) 86'; Makra (red card) 87'	Stadium: Budai II. László Stadion; Attendance: 350; Referee: Zsolt Szabó

5 May 2012 26	Nyíregyháza	6–2	Rákospalota	Nyíregyháza
17:30 CEST (UTC+2)	Csorba 21', 87'; Nánási (yellow card) 38'; Germán 47', 80'; K. Szilágyi 51'; Vinicius (yellow card) 56'; Pákolicz 68'	Report	P. Tóth 35'; Böőr 39' (pen.); Kornis (yellow card) 40'; M. Gulyás (red card) 42'	Stadium: Városi Stadion; Attendance: 800; Referee: Gábor Oláh

11 May 2012 27	Rákospalota	2–5	Balmazújváros	Budapest
18:00 CEST (UTC+2)	P. Tóth 10', (yellow card) 60'; Jovánczai 32' (pen.), (yellow card) 52'; Z. Szabó (yellow card) 74'	Report	Ludánszki (yellow card) 31'; Urbin 33', 74'; L. Kiss 42'; M. Belényesi 50'; R. Nagy 56'	Stadium: Budai II. László Stadion; Attendance: 250; Referee: Ádám Németh

18 May 2012 28	Vác	4–0	Rákospalota	Vác
18:00 CEST (UTC+2)	Á. Andrejcsik 10'; Albert 42'; Palásthy 66', 69'; M. Króner (yellow card) 74'	Report	Kornis (yellow card) 77'	Stadium: Ligeti Stadion; Attendance: 300; Referee: Balázs Berke

26 May 2012 29	Szeged	6–2	Rákospalota	Szeged
18:00 CEST (UTC+2)	Borbély 9'; Orosz 15', 37', 66'; N. Geiger 23', (yellow card) 74'; M. Ulvicki (yellow card) 28'; R. Kis (yellow card) 75'; Bamba 77'; A. Trepák (yellow card) 83'	Report	Menyhért (yellow card) 8'; Jovánczai (yellow card) 16'; Z. Szabó 46'; Böőr 90'	Stadium: Szegedi VSE Stadion; Attendance: 2,000; Referee: Ádám Farkas

2 June 2012 30	Rákospalota	1–2	Szolnok	Budapest
18:00 CEST (UTC+2)	Böőr (yellow card) 27'; P. Tóth (yellow card) 43'; Jovánczai 60'	Report	Tóth B. (yellow card) 16'; Balogh (yellow card) 23'; Lengyel 41'; Mundi 55'	Stadium: Budai II. László Stadion; Attendance: 300; Referee: Szabolcs Szilasi

=== Magyar Kupa ===
14 August 2011 Round of 128	Szécsény	0–3	Rákospalota	Szécsény
17:00 CEST (UTC+2)	T. Németh (yellow card) 45'; I. Ökrös (yellow card) 54'; A. Botos (yellow card) 56'	Report	Gulyás 24'; Z. Szabó 32'; Nyerges (yellow card) 54'; Menyhért 67'	Stadium: Szécsényi Sportpálya; Referee: Miklós Demeter

21 September 2011 Round of 64	MTK	4–0	Rákospalota	Budapest
15:30 CEST (UTC+2)	Molnár 20'; Csiki 22'; J. Kanta 33'; Frank 37'; Pölöskei (yellow card) 67'	Report	Cseri (yellow card) 78'	Stadium: Hidegkuti Nándor Stadion; Referee: József Erdős

== Statistics ==
=== Overall ===
Appearances (Apps) numbers are for appearances in competitive games only, including sub appearances.
Source: Competitions

No.	Player	Pos.	Nemzeti Bajnokság II				Magyar Kupa				Total			
No.	Player	Pos.	Apps	Goal	Yellow card	Red card	Apps	Goal	Yellow card	Red card	Apps	Goal	Yellow card	Red card
1	(Hungary) Dominik Csurgai	GK												
1	(Hungary) Viktor Szentpéteri	GK	6								6			
1	(Hungary) Péter Zoltán Tóth	GK	8			1					8			1
2	(Hungary) Balázs Dinka	DF	18		2		1				19		2	
3	(Hungary) Imre Hibó	DF	4				1				5			
4	(Hungary) Csaba Ködöböcz	MF	1		1						1		1	
5	(Hungary) Gergő Menyhért	DF	27	1	3		2	1			29	2	3	
6	(Hungary) Máté Gulyás	DF	22	1	6	1	2	1			24	2	6	1
7	(Hungary) Gergő Cseri	DF	14		3		2		1		16		4	
8	(Hungary) Tamás Kiss	MF	14	4	2	1	2				16	4	2	1
9	(Hungary) Patrik Czimmermann	FW	1				1				2			
10	(Hungary) Zsolt Szabó	FW	19	8	2		2	1			21	9	2	
11	(Hungary) Krisztián Nyerges	FW	12	3	1		1		1		13	3	2	
12	(Hungary) Roland Igar	GK												
13	(Hungary) Martin Tímár	DF												
14	(Hungary) Balázs Kovács	MF	12		1	1	2				14		1	1
15	(Hungary) Tamás Alm	MF	1								1			
15	(Hungary) Péter Belényesi	FW	3								3			
15	(Hungary) Máté Fézler	FW	2								2			
15	(Hungary) Ádám Lénárd	DF												
16	(Hungary) Gellért Vajda	GK	8								8			
17	(Hungary) Károly Kiss	MF	28	1	2		2				30	1	2	
18	(Hungary) Balázs Gáspár	MF	3				1				4			
19	(Hungary) Tamás Tóvizi	DF	11								11			
20	(Hungary) Attila Menyhárt	MF	26	2	2		2				28	2	2	
21	(Hungary) Attila Tóth	FW	1								1			
22	(Hungary) Zoltán Jovánczai	FW	25	7	7	2	1				26	7	7	2
23	(Hungary) Attila Kornis	DF	25		8		1				26		8	
24	(Hungary) Márkó Sós	DF	26	5	5		1				27	5	5	
25	(Hungary) Balázs Olay	MF	7								7			
26	(Hungary) Olivér Frideczky	MF	1								1			
27	(Hungary) Péter Tóth	FW	25	6	4		1				26	6	4	
29	(Hungary) Márton Göntér	MF	7								7			
30	(Hungary) Károly Illés	MF	14		1		1				15		1	
31	(Hungary) Roland Kunsági	GK	9				2				11			
32	(Hungary) Bence Bacskai	FW	5								5			
32	(Hungary) Patrik Vezsenyi	MF												
33	(Hungary) Zoltán Böőr	MF	23	5	2	1	1				24	5	2	1
Own goals				1								1		
Totals				44	52	7		3	2			47	54	7

=== Clean sheets ===
			Clean sheets		
No.	Player	Games Played	Nemzeti Bajnokság II	Magyar Kupa	Total
31	(Hungary) Roland Kunsági	11	3	1	4
1	(Hungary) Viktor Szentpéteri	6	1		1
16	(Hungary) Gellért Vajda	8	1		1
1	(Hungary) Dominik Csurgai	0			0
1	(Hungary) Péter Zoltán Tóth	8	0		0
12	(Hungary) Roland Igar	0			0
Totals			5	1	6
