= 2006–07 Vasas SC season =

Vasas
2006–07 season
- Manager: Géza Mészöly
- Stadium: Illovszky Rudolf Stadion
- Nemzeti Bajnokság I: 5th
- Magyar Kupa: Semi-finals
- Top goalscorer: League: Norbert Németh; János Lázok (9 each); All: János Lázok (15)
- Highest home attendance: 7,000 v Ferencváros (4 April 2007, Magyar Kupa)
- Lowest home attendance: 500 v Dunakanyar-Vác (8 November 2006, Magyar Kupa)
- Average home league attendance: 2,160
- Biggest win: 8–0 v Kóka (Away, 19 September 2006, Magyar Kupa)
- Biggest defeat: 1–5 v MTK (Home, 16 September 2006, Nemzeti Bajnokság I)

The 2006–07 season was Vasas Sport Club's 79th competitive season, 3rd consecutive season in the Nemzeti Bajnokság I and 101st season in existence as a football club. In addition to the domestic league, Vasas participated in that season's editions of the Magyar Kupa.

== Squad ==
Squad at end of season

Note: Flags indicate national team as defined under FIFA eligibility rules; some limited exceptions apply. Players may hold more than one non-FIFA nationality.

| No. | Pos. | Nation | Player |
|---|---|---|---|
| 1 | GK | (Hungary) HUN | Csaba Borszéki |
| 2 | DF | (Hungary) HUN | Dániel Kollár |
| 3 | DF | (Hungary) HUN | Miklós Balogh |
| 4 | DF | (Hungary) HUN | Balázs Mogyoróssy |
| 5 | DF | (Hungary) HUN | Péter Pandur |
| 6 | MF | (Hungary) HUN | Zoltán Pintér |
| 7 | FW | (Hungary) HUN | Károly Kiss |
| 8 | MF | (Hungary) HUN | Norbert Németh |
| 10 | MF | (Hungary) HUN | Árpád Majoros |
| 11 | MF | (Hungary) HUN | János Lázok |
| 12 | GK | (Hungary) HUN | Ádám Bogdán |
| 13 | FW | (Hungary) HUN | Tamás Skita |
| 14 | MF | (Hungary) HUN | Tamás Tandari |
| 16 | MF | (Hungary) HUN | Csaba Ködöböcz |

| No. | Pos. | Nation | Player |
|---|---|---|---|
| 17 | MF | (Hungary) HUN | Péter Odrobéna |
| 18 | FW | (Hungary) HUN | Tamás Nagy |
| 19 | DF | (Hungary) HUN | Zoltán Fehér |
| 20 | FW | (Hungary) HUN | Krisztián Kenesei |
| 21 | DF | (Hungary) HUN | András Tóth |
| 22 | MF | (Hungary) HUN | Ákos Harnisch |
| 23 | MF | (Hungary) HUN | Péter Kincses |
| 25 | DF | (Hungary) HUN | Gábor Kovács |
| 27 | DF | (Hungary) HUN | Zsolt Balog |
| 28 | DF | (Poland) POL | Mariusz Unierzyski |
| 29 | FW | (Hungary) HUN | Péter Bali |
| 31 | MF | (Hungary) HUN | Roland Mundi |
| 32 | MF | (Hungary) HUN | József Piller |
| 33 | GK | (Hungary) HUN | Gábor Németh |

== Transfers ==
=== Transfers in ===
| Transfer window | Pos. | No. | Player | From |
|---|---|---|---|---|
| Summer | — | — | (Hungary) Tamás Angyal | (Hungary) Rákospalota |
| Summer | DF | — | (Hungary) Pál Berendy | (Hungary) Vecsés |
| Summer | — | — | (Hungary) Róbert Hajnal | (Hungary) Ferencváros |
| Summer | DF | — | (Hungary) Péter Lázár | (Hungary) Kecskemét |
| Summer | — | — | (Hungary) Tamás Molnár | (Hungary) Rákosmenti TK |
| Summer | — | — | (Hungary) Máté Szabó | (Hungary) Rákosmenti KSK |
| Summer | DF | — | (Hungary) Milán Szilasi | (Hungary) Ferencváros |
| Summer | — | — | (Hungary) Péter Szőke | (Hungary) Honvéd |
| Summer | DF | 5 | (Hungary) Péter Pandur | (Hungary) Soroksár |
| Summer | FW | 7 | (Hungary) Károly Kiss | (Hungary) Vecsés |
| Summer | FW | 13 | (Hungary) Tamás Skita | (Hungary) III. Kerület |
| Summer | MF | 17 | (Hungary) Péter Odrobéna | (Hungary) Kazincbarcika |
| Summer | FW | 18 | (Hungary) Tamás Nagy | (Hungary) Dunakanyar-Vác |
| Summer | FW | 20 | (Hungary) Zsolt Nagy | (Ukraine) Chornomorets Odesa |
| Summer | MF | 22 | (Hungary) Ákos Harnisch | (Hungary) III. Kerület |
| Summer | MF | 23 | (Hungary) Péter Kincses | (Hungary) Pápa |
| Summer | DF | 25 | (Hungary) Gábor Kovács | (Hungary) Ferencváros |
| Summer | DF | 28 | (Poland) Mariusz Unierzyski | (Greece) Ilisiakos |
| Summer | FW | 29 | (Hungary) Péter Bali | (Hungary) Szolnok |
| Winter | FW | 20 | (Hungary) Krisztián Kenesei | (China) Beijing Guoan |

=== Transfers out ===
| Transfer window | Pos. | No. | Player | To |
|---|---|---|---|---|
| Summer | FW | — | (Hungary) Csaba Csordás | (Hungary) Kecskemét |
| Summer | MF | — | (Hungary) Gergő Siróczki | (Hungary) Bőcs |
| Summer | MF | — | (Hungary) Ádám Székesi | (Hungary) Felcsút |
| Summer | MF | — | (Hungary) András Vágó | (Hungary) Jászapáti |
| Summer | DF | 2 | (Hungary) Zoltán Molnár | (Hungary) Paks |
| Summer | DF | 4 | (Hungary) György Kiss | (England) Nantwich Town |
| Summer | MF | 6 | (Hungary) János Zováth | (Hungary) Paks |
| Summer | MF | 7 | (Serbia) Ivan Janjic | Released |
| Summer | FW | 9 | (Hungary) Róbert Waltner | (Hungary) Zalaegerszeg |
| Summer | MF | 14 | (Hungary) Zsolt Bárányos | (Hungary) Rákospalota |
| Summer | MF | 16 | (Slovenia) Adem Kapič | Released (Note: Joined Pápa on Summer 2007.) |
| Summer | DF | 19 | (Slovakia) Otto Szabó | (Slovakia) DAC Dunajská Streda |
| Summer | MF | 20 | (Hungary) Henrik Rósa | (Hungary) BKV Előre |
| Summer | MF | 29 | (Hungary) Dániel Völgyi | (Hungary) Újpest |
| Autumn | FW | 9 | (Hungary) Szabolcs Gyánó | (Portugal) Académica |
| Winter | DF | — | (Hungary) Péter Lázár | (Hungary) Budafok |
| Winter | FW | 20 | (Hungary) Zsolt Nagy | (Ukraine) Zakarpattia Uzhhorod |
| Winter | MF | 28 | (Hungary) Norbert Hegedűs | (Hungary) Soroksár |

=== Loans in ===
| Transfer window | Pos. | No. | Player | From | End date |
|---|---|---|---|---|---|
| Summer | — | — | (Hungary) Xavér Ambrus | (Hungary) Újpest | End of season |
| Summer | MF | — | (Hungary) Márk Aranyos | (Hungary) MTK | Middle of season |
| Summer | DF | 3 | (Hungary) Miklós Balogh | (Hungary) Orosháza | End of season |

=== Loans out ===
| Transfer window | Pos. | No. | Player | To | End date |
|---|---|---|---|---|---|
| Summer | GK | — | (Hungary) Dániel Botlik | (Hungary) Láng | Middle of season |
| Summer | — | — | (Hungary) Kálmán Kerényi | (Hungary) Pénzügyőr | End of season |
| Summer | MF | — | (Hungary) Róbert Rompos | (Hungary) Mosonmagyaróvár | Middle of season |
| Summer | MF | 28 | (Hungary) Norbert Hegedűs | (Hungary) Soroksár | Middle of season |
| Winter | DF | 4 | (Hungary) Balázs Mogyoróssy | (Hungary) Budaörs | End of season |
| Winter | GK | 12 | (Hungary) Ádám Bogdán | (Hungary) Vecsés | End of season |

== Competitions ==
=== Overview ===
| Competition | First match | Last match | Starting round | Final position | Record | | | | | | | |
| Competition | First match | Last match | Starting round | Final position | Pld | W | D | L | GF | GA | GD | Win % |
|---|---|---|---|---|---|---|---|---|---|---|---|---|
| Nemzeti Bajnokság I | 29 July 2006 | 25 May 2007 | Matchday 1 | 5th | 30 | 13 | 6 | 11 | 43 | 41 | +2 | 43.33 |
| Magyar Kupa | 30 August 2006 | 24 April 2007 | Second round | Semi-finals | 9 | 5 | 2 | 2 | 22 | 9 | +13 | 55.56 |
| Total | | | | | 39 | 18 | 8 | 13 | 65 | 50 | +15 | 46.15 |

Source: Competitions

=== Nemzeti Bajnokság I ===
==== League table ====
| Pos | Team | Pld | W | D | L | GF | GA | GD | Pts | Qualification or relegation |
|---|---|---|---|---|---|---|---|---|---|---|
| 3 | Zalaegerszeg | 30 | 17 | 4 | 9 | 54 | 38 | +16 | 55 | Qualification for the Intertoto Cup second round |
| 4 | Újpest | 30 | 15 | 4 | 11 | 39 | 32 | +7 | 46 (Note: Újpest were deducted three points due to federation decision.) | |
| 5 | Vasas | 30 | 13 | 6 | 11 | 43 | 41 | +2 | 45 | |
| 6 | Fehérvár | 30 | 13 | 5 | 12 | 45 | 43 | +2 | 44 | |
| 7 | Kaposvár | 30 | 12 | 5 | 13 | 40 | 36 | +4 | 41 | |

Source: soccerway.com

==== Results summary ====
| Overall | | | | | | | | Home | | | | | | Away | | | | | |
| Pld | W | D | L | GF | GA | GD | Pts | W | D | L | GF | GA | GD | W | D | L | GF | GA | GD |
|---|---|---|---|---|---|---|---|---|---|---|---|---|---|---|---|---|---|---|---|
| 30 | 13 | 6 | 11 | 43 | 41 | +2 | 45 | 6 | 5 | 4 | 25 | 21 | +4 | 7 | 1 | 7 | 18 | 20 | −2 |

Source: Hungarian Football Federation

==== Results by round ====
| Round | 1 | 2 | 3 | 4 | 5 | 6 | 7 | 8 | 9 | 10 | 11 | 12 | 13 | 14 | 15 | 16 | 17 | 18 | 19 | 20 | 21 | 22 | 23 | 24 | 25 | 26 | 27 | 28 | 29 | 30 |
|---|---|---|---|---|---|---|---|---|---|---|---|---|---|---|---|---|---|---|---|---|---|---|---|---|---|---|---|---|---|---|
| Ground | A | H | A | H | A | H | A | H | A | H | A | H | A | H | A | H | A | H | A | H | A | H | A | H | A | H | A | H | A | H |
| Result | W | D | L | W | L | L | W | W | L | W | L | D | L | L | W | W | W | L | W | D | D | D | W | L | W | W | L | D | L | W |
| Position | 8 | 5 | 10 | 6 | 8 | 10 | 8 | 6 | 8 | 6 | 8 | 7 | 8 | 11 | 9 | 7 | 7 | 7 | 7 | 6 | 6 | 7 | 5 | 5 | 5 | 5 | 5 | 5 | 6 | 5 |
| Points | 3 | 4 | 4 | 7 | 7 | 7 | 10 | 13 | 13 | 16 | 16 | 17 | 17 | 17 | 20 | 23 | 26 | 26 | 29 | 30 | 31 | 32 | 35 | 35 | 38 | 41 | 41 | 42 | 42 | 45 |

Source: Matches
A = Away; H = Home; W = Win; D = Draw; L = Loss

==== Matches ====
| 29 July 2006 1 | Kaposvár | 0–1 | Vasas | Kaposvár |
| 20:00 CEST (UTC+2) | P. Szakály (yellow card) 3'; Vasiljević (yellow card) 47'; Andruskó (yellow card) 69' | Report | N. Németh (yellow card) 28'; Mogyoróssy (red card) 32'; Tóth 60'; Pandur (yellow card) 68'; G. Németh (yellow card) 85'; Lázok (yellow card) 89' | Stadium: Rákóczi Stadion; Attendance: 2,500; Referee: István Mészáros; Assistant referees: Dr. Péter Szabó, László Viszokai; Fourth official: Péter Tatai |

| 5 August 2006 2 | Vasas | 2–2 | Dunakanyar-Vác | Budapest |
| 20:00 CEST (UTC+2) | Kincses 17', 45'; Tóth (yellow card) 39'; Lázok (yellow card) 41' | Report | Kovács (yellow card) 45'; Palásthy 81', (yellow card) 85'; Gáspár 90+2'; Svintek (yellow card) 90+3' | Stadium: Illovszky Rudolf Stadion; Attendance: 4,000; Referee: Csaba Imre Sápi; Assistant referees: Gyula Ortó, Ferenc Székely; Fourth official: József Berger |

| 21 August 2006 3 | Debrecen | 3–0 | Vasas | Debrecen |
| 18:00 CEST (UTC+2) | Halmosi 9'; Éger 66' (pen.); B. Virág 90' | Report | | Stadium: Oláh Gábor utcai Stadion; Attendance: 6,500; Referee: Tamás Arany; Assistant referees: László Viszokai, Dr. Zsolt Varga; Fourth official: Róbert Nagy |

| 28 August 2006 4 | Vasas | 2–0 | Tatabánya | Budapest |
| 18:00 CEST (UTC+2) | Unierzyski (yellow card) 36'; Pintér (yellow card) 39'; N. Németh 60'; Balog (yellow card) 78'; Pandur 89', (yellow card) 89' | Report | Bakrač (yellow card) 15'; Kouemaha (yellow card) 39'; Jezdimirović (yellow card) 42' (yellow-red card) 60'; Filó (yellow card) 90+2' | Stadium: Illovszky Rudolf Stadion; Attendance: 2,000; Referee: Zoltán Iványi; Assistant referees: Zsolt Szpisják, István Tóth; Fourth official: Attila Hegedűs |

| 9 September 2006 5 | Fehérvár | 2–0 | Vasas | Székesfehérvár |
| 19:00 CEST (UTC+2) | Mohl (yellow card) 30', (goal) 40'; Zs. Fehér 66' | Report | Kincses (yellow card) 23'; N. Németh (yellow card) 30'; Tóth (yellow card) 56' | Stadium: Sóstói Stadion; Attendance: 2,500; Referee: Péter Solymosi; Assistant referees: Gábor Takács, Oszkár Lémon; Fourth official: Krisztián Király |

| 16 September 2006 6 | Vasas | 1–5 | MTK | Budapest |
| 15:00 CEST (UTC+2) | Skita 63' | Report | Kanta 4', (yellow card) 33'; Hrepka 28'; Rodenbücher (yellow card) 30'; K. Németh 65', 84', 87'; Horváth (yellow card) 70' | Stadium: Illovszky Rudolf Stadion; Attendance: 1,500; Referee: Viktor Kassai; Assistant referees: Gábor Erős, Tibor Vámos; Fourth official: Balázs Világi |

| 22 September 2006 7 | Diósgyőr | 1–2 | Vasas | Miskolc |
| 19:00 CEST (UTC+2) | Sipeki (yellow card) 32'; Elek (yellow card) 40'; Mogyorósi (yellow card) 46'; Szögedi 50' | Report | Unierzyski 30', (yellow card) 86'; Lázok (yellow card) 45'; Tóth 51'; Fehér (yellow card) 83' | Stadium: Diósgyőri Stadion; Attendance: 2,000; Referee: Zsolt Szabó; Assistant referees: Róbert Kispál, Dr. Péter Hegyi; Fourth official: Ákos Telek |

| 29 September 2006 8 | Vasas | 3–2 | Győr | Budapest |
| 19:00 CEST (UTC+2) | Kincses 26'; N. Németh 60', 90+3' | Report | Granát (yellow card) 34'; Bajzát 48', 66'; Müller (yellow card) 49' (yellow-red card) 90+2'; Szabó (yellow card) 65' | Stadium: Illovszky Rudolf Stadion; Attendance: 1,500; Referee: Sándor Andó-Szabó; Assistant referees: Zoltán Kis, Zoltán Szalai; Fourth official: Gergely Sulyok |

| 16 October 2006 9 | Újpest | 2–0 | Vasas | Budapest |
| 18:00 CEST (UTC+2) | Rajczi 59'; Kovács 90+2' | Report | A. Tóth (yellow card) 63'; Kincses (yellow card) 70'; Fehér (yellow card) 90+1' | Stadium: Szusza Ferenc Stadion; Attendance: 3,000; Referee: István Mészáros; Assistant referees: Róbert Kispál, László Viszokai; Fourth official: Péter Herbály |

| 21 October 2006 10 | Vasas | 1–0 | Rákospalota | Budapest |
| 18:00 CEST (UTC+2) | Ködöböcz (yellow card) 60'; N. Németh 90+2' | Report | Polonkai (yellow card) 31'; Pusztai (red card) 60'; Földvári (yellow card) 88' | Stadium: Illovszky Rudolf Stadion; Attendance: 2,500; Referee: Szabolcs Szilasi; Assistant referees: Dr. Zsolt Varga, Gyula Ortó; Fourth official: Péter Pető |

| 30 October 2006 11 | Zalaegerszeg | 1–0 | Vasas | Zalaegerszeg |
| 18:00 CET (UTC+1) | Fehér 58' (o.g.); Ljubojević (yellow card) 89' | Report | Z. Nagy (yellow card) 12'; Pandur (yellow card) 29' | Stadium: ZTE Arena; Attendance: 5,000; Referee: Péter Solymosi; Assistant referees: Gábor Takács, Imre Attila Nagy; Fourth official: Csaba Ursprung |

| 4 November 2006 12 | Vasas | 0–0 | Sopron | Budapest |
| 17:00 CET (UTC+1) | Pintér (yellow card) 52' | Report | Ankamah (yellow card) 56'; Magasföldi (yellow card) 81' | Stadium: Illovszky Rudolf Stadion; Attendance: 600; Referee: Krisztián Pánczél; Assistant referees: Tibor Vígh, Tamás Márkus; Fourth official: Róbert Nagy |

| 11 November 2006 13 | Pécs | 2–1 | Vasas | Pécs |
| 17:00 CET (UTC+1) | Kulcsár 24', 72'; Lantos (yellow card) 33'; Győri (yellow card) 78' | Report | Ködöböcz (yellow card) 24'; Kovács (yellow card) 51'; N. Németh (yellow card) 84', (goal) 90+2' | Stadium: Stadion PMFC; Attendance: 1,000; Referee: Ferenc Bede; Assistant referees: László Viszokai, György Ring; Fourth official: Miklós Demeter |

| 17 November 2006 14 | Vasas | 0–1 | Paks | Budapest |
| 18:00 CET (UTC+1) | Kincses (yellow card) 9'; Bali (yellow card) 61' | Report | Zováth (yellow card) 30', (goal) 74'; Molnár (yellow card) 33'; Barics (yellow card) 44'; Fehér (yellow card) 54'; Buzás (yellow card) 56'; Mészáros (yellow card) 85' | Stadium: Illovszky Rudolf Stadion; Attendance: 1,000; Referee: István Vad; Assistant referees: Imre Attila Nagy, Zsolt Márton; Fourth official: Attila Lidi |

| 27 November 2006 15 | Honvéd | 0–1 | Vasas | Budapest (Note: The match was played at the Béke téri Stadion in Budapest, instead of Honvéd regular stadium, the Bozsik József Stadion in Budapest, due to the renovation work.) |
| 18:00 CET (UTC+1) | Pomper (yellow card) 85' | Report | Pandur (yellow card) 12'; T. Nagy (yellow card) 47'; N. Németh 74' | Stadium: Béke téri Stadion; Attendance: 900; Referee: Károly Török; Assistant referees: Zoltán Tompos, Ferenc Székely |

| 2 December 2006 16 | Vasas | 1–0 | Kaposvár | Budapest |
| 15:00 CET (UTC+1) | Z. Pintér (yellow card) 45'; Lázok 61'; T. Nagy (yellow card) 63'; Kiss (yellow card) 71'; Skita (yellow card) 90+3' | Report | Grúz (yellow card) 39'; Zahorecz (yellow card) 74'; Kovácsevics (red card) 90+3' | Stadium: Illovszky Rudolf Stadion; Attendance: 1,000; Referee: Péter Solymosi; Assistant referees: Attila Kelemen, Zoltán Pápai; Fourth official: Róbert Nagy |

| 11 December 2006 17 | Dunakanyar-Vác | 0–1 | Vasas | Vác |
| 18:00 CET (UTC+1) | P. Kovács (yellow card) 35'; Laskai (yellow card) 69'; Kunzo (yellow card) 73' | Report | Pandur 43'; Tóth (yellow card) 61' | Stadium: Ligeti Stadion; Attendance: 600; Referee: Sándor Gergely; Assistant referees: István Szécsényi, Szabolcs Deutsch; Fourth official: Norbert Kiss |

| 23 February 2007 18 | Vasas | 0–1 | Debrecen | Budapest |
| 19:00 CET (UTC+1) | Unierzyski (yellow card) 24'; Piller (yellow card) 52'; Lázok (yellow card) 66'; Pintér (yellow card) 80' | Report | Sidibe (yellow card) 27'; Dzsudzsák (yellow card) 64'; Tchana 86' | Stadium: Illovszky Rudolf Stadion; Attendance: 1,500; Referee: Sándor Andó-Szabó; Assistant referees: Zsolt Szpisják, Vencel Tóth II; Fourth official: Péter Pető |

| 3 March 2007 19 | Tatabánya | 1–3 | Vasas | Tatabánya |
| 15:00 CET (UTC+1) | Megyesi (yellow card) 26'; Szőke 28' | Report | Kenesei (yellow card) 38', (goal) 42'; Pintér (yellow card) 63'; Lázok 78'; Kincses 90+3' | Stadium: Városi Stadion; Attendance: 1,500; Referee: István Mészáros; Assistant referees: Imre Attila Nagy, László Viszokai; Fourth official: Gábor Oláh |

| 9 March 2007 20 | Vasas | 2–2 | Fehérvár | Budapest |
| 19:00 CET (UTC+1) | N. Németh (yellow card) 16', (goal) 57'; Kenesei 19'; Fehér (yellow card) 26'; Tóth (yellow card) 30' | Report | F. Horváth (yellow card) 22', (goal) 56'; Julinho 59', (yellow card) 59'; Dvéri (yellow card) 65' | Stadium: Illovszky Rudolf Stadion; Attendance: 1,000; Referee: Sándor Gergely; Assistant referees: Szabolcs Deutsch, Zsolt Szalai; Fourth official: Tibor Gyarmati II |

| 19 March 2007 21 | MTK | 2–2 | Vasas | Budapest |
| 18:00 CET (UTC+1) | Kanta 39'; Bori 53'; Pollák (yellow card) 62'; Balogh (yellow card) 89'; K. Németh (yellow card) 90+1' | Report | Kovács 58'; Z. Pintér (yellow card) 75'; Bali 85' | Stadium: Hidegkuti Nándor Stadion; Attendance: 1,500; Referee: Mihály Fábián; Assistant referees: György Ring, Tamás Márkus; Fourth official: Róbert Nagy |

| 31 March 2007 22 | Vasas | 2–2 | Diósgyőr | Budapest |
| 16:00 CEST (UTC+2) | Lázok 60', 77' | Report | Abdou 79'; Halgas 89'; Sadjo (yellow card) 90+1' | Stadium: Illovszky Rudolf Stadion; Attendance: 4,000; Referee: József Berger; Assistant referees: Zsolt Márton, Attila Forgács; Fourth official: Gábor Oláh |

| 7 April 2007 23 | Győr | 0–2 | Vasas | Győr |
| 14:30 CEST (UTC+2) | Tokody (yellow card) 65' | Report | Kenesei 7'; Lázok 38' | Stadium: ETO Park; Attendance: 4,400; Referee: Szabolcs Szilasi; Assistant referees: Dr. Péter Szabó, Balázs Huszár; Fourth official: Krisztián Király |

| 13 April 2007 24 | Vasas | 1–2 | Újpest | Budapest |
| 19:00 CEST (UTC+2) | Kincses 54' | Report | Sándor 36'; Z. Kovács 37' | Stadium: Illovszky Rudolf Stadion; Attendance: 5,000; Referee: Zoltán Iványi; Assistant referees: Zsolt Szpisják, István Albert; Fourth official: Attila Hegedűs |

| 21 April 2007 25 | Rákospalota | 1–3 | Vasas | Budapest |
| 17:00 CEST (UTC+2) | Somorjai (yellow card) 18'; G. Horváth (yellow card) 37'; Kapcsos (red card) 58'; Torma 86' | Report | Lázok 45'; Pandur 64'; K. Kiss 87' | Stadium: Budai II. László Stadion; Attendance: 1,200; Referee: Ferenc Bede; Assistant referees: Imre Attila Nagy, László Viszokai; Fourth official: Gábor Péter Kovács |

| 28 April 2007 26 | Vasas | 4–0 | Zalaegerszeg | Budapest |
| 16:00 CEST (UTC+2) | Lázok 20', 70'; N. Németh 28'; Fehér (yellow card) 37'; Pandur (yellow card) 50'; Kincses 64' | Report | Kocsárdi (yellow card) 20'; Molnár (red card) 20'; Simonfalvi (yellow card) 45' | Stadium: Illovszky Rudolf Stadion; Attendance: 1,800; Referee: Mihály Fábián; Assistant referees: Zoltán Pápai, Dr. Zsolt Varga; Fourth official: Ádám Németh |

| 5 May 2007 27 | Sopron | 1–0 | Vasas | Sopron |
| 18:00 CEST (UTC+2) | Sira (yellow card) 52' (yellow-red card) 63'; Magasföldi 74'; Dragomir (yellow card) 84' | Report | Kovács (yellow card) 7'; Pintér (yellow card) 90' | Stadium: Káposztás utcai Stadion; Attendance: 2,000; Referee: Sándor Gergely; Assistant referees: Zoltán Szalai, Balázs Farkas; Fourth official: Tibor Gyarmati II |

| 12 May 2007 28 | Vasas | 3–3 | Pécs | Budapest |
| 18:00 CEST (UTC+2) | Kenesei 20'; Pintér (yellow card) 38'; Lázok 63'; Pandur 71'; A. Tóth (yellow card) 72' | Report | Pest 17', 33'; Dienes (yellow card) 24'; Finta (yellow card) 50'; Kulcsár 88' | Stadium: Illovszky Rudolf Stadion; Attendance: 2,500; Referee: Szabolcs Szilasi; Assistant referees: József Heibl, György Ring; Fourth official: Gábor Péter Kovács |

| 19 May 2007 29 | Paks | 4–2 | Vasas | Paks |
| 18:00 CEST (UTC+2) | Tamási (yellow card) 15'; Buzás 24'; Molnár (yellow card) 30'; Heffler 42'; Horváth 68'; Belényesi 72' | Report | Pintér (yellow card) 20' (yellow-red card) 22'; Balog (yellow card) 23'; T. Nagy 71'; Kincses 87'; Kenesei (yellow card) 90+2' | Stadium: Fehérvári úti Stadion; Attendance: 3,000; Referee: Ferenc Bede; Assistant referees: Balázs Huszár, Dr. Péter Szabó; Fourth official: Gergő Király |

| 25 May 2007 30 | Vasas | 3–1 | Honvéd | Budapest |
| 19:00 CEST (UTC+2) | Kenesei 5'; N. Németh 21'; Unierzyski (yellow card) 31'; T. Nagy 66', (yellow card) 73'; Fehér (yellow card) 67'; Odrobéna (yellow card) 86' | Report | Schindler (yellow card) 21'; Debreceni (yellow card) 28'; Bogdanović 65' | Stadium: Illovszky Rudolf Stadion; Attendance: 2,500; Referee: Viktor Kassai; Assistant referees: Gábor Erős, Tibor Vámos; Fourth official: Ádám Németh |

=== Magyar Kupa ===
| 30 August 2006 Second round | Somosi | 0–3 | Vasas | Somoskőújfalu |
| 16:00 CEST (UTC+2) | | Report | Lázok 3x | Stadium: Somoskőújfalui Sportpálya; Attendance: 1,500; Referee: Péter Herbály |

| 19 September 2006 Third round | Kóka | 0–8 | Vasas | Kóka |
| 15:30 CEST (UTC+2) | | Report | Skita 2x; Ködöböcz; Lázok (pen.); Balog; Odrobéna; T. Nagy; Kincses | Stadium: Kókai Sportpálya; Attendance: 1,500; Referee: Világi; Assistant referees: Róbert Kispál, Tibor Vámos |

| 25 October 2006 Round of 32 | Soroksár | 2–3 | Vasas | Budapest |
| 13:30 CEST (UTC+2) | Havrán 6'; Baranyai (yellow card) 30'; Vass (red card) 40'; C. Hegedűs (yellow card) 53'; Hidvégi 54'; Hajdú (yellow card) 69' | Report | Lázok 40', 67', (yellow card) 90+1'; Odrobéna 71' | Stadium: Haraszti út Attendance: 400; Referee: Csaba Pintér; Assistant referees: Dr. Péter Szabó, László Viszokai |

==== Round of 16 ====
| 8 November 2006 First leg | Vasas | 2–1 | Dunakanyar-Vác | Budapest |
| 18:00 CET (UTC+1) | T. Nagy 37', (yellow card) 40'; Bali 51'; Fehér (yellow card) 63' | Report | Gáspár (yellow card) 17'; Szabó 25'; Sinkó (yellow card) 88' | Stadium: Illovszky Rudolf Stadion; Attendance: 500; Referee: Sándor Andó-Szabó; Assistant referees: Jozsef Heibl, Tibor Vígh |

| 22 November 2006 Second leg | Dunakanyar-Vác | 1–1 (2–3 agg.) | Vasas | Vác |
| 18:00 CET (UTC+1) | Svintek (yellow card) 28'; Laskai 36' | Report | Pandur 27'; Kiss (yellow card) 74' | Stadium: Ligeti Stadion; Attendance: 500; Referee: Tamás Arany; Assistant referees: Ferenc Székely, Oszkár Lémon |
Note: Vasas won 3–2 on aggregate.

==== Quarter-finals ====
| 22 March 2007 First leg | Ferencváros | 0–2 | Vasas | Budapest |
| 20:45 CET (UTC+1) | Lipcsei (yellow card) 30' | Report | Bali (yellow card) 12'; Pintér (yellow card) 19'; N. Németh 26'; Odrobéna (yellow card) 33'; Kenesei 78'; Lázok (yellow card) 88' | Stadium: Üllői úti Stadion; Attendance: 8,000; Referee: Viktor Kassai; Assistant referees: Gábor Erős, Tibor Vámos |

| 4 April 2007 Second leg | Vasas | 2–3 (4–3 agg.) | Ferencváros | Budapest |
| 18:00 CEST (UTC+2) | Kenesei 16', 40'; Pintér (yellow card) 37'; Németh (yellow card) 55'; Odrobéna (yellow card) 82' | Report | Dragóner (yellow card) 39', (goal) 78'; Tököli (yellow card) 44', (goal) 79'; Lazić 56' | Stadium: Illovszky Rudolf Stadion; Attendance: 7,000; Referee: Tamás Arany; Assistant referees: Attila Kelemen, Gyula Fehér; Fourth official: József Erdős |
Note: Vasas won 4–3 on aggregate.

==== Semi-finals ====
| 18 April 2007 First leg | Honvéd | 0–0 | Vasas | Budapest |
| 19:00 CEST (UTC+2) | Ndjodo (yellow card) 72' | Report | Pintér (yellow card) 45'; Pandur (yellow card) 51'; Balog (yellow card) 64'; Piller (yellow card) 88' | Stadium: Bozsik József Stadion; Attendance: 4,000; Referee: Viktor Kassai; Assistant referees: Gábor Erős, Tibor Vámos; Fourth official: Péter Herbály |

| 24 April 2007 Second leg | Vasas | 1–2 (1–2 agg.) | Honvéd | Budapest |
| 18:00 CEST (UTC+2) | Pandur (yellow card) 20'; A. Tóth (yellow card) 31'; N. Németh 45'; Fehér (yellow card) 71' | Report | Dobos (yellow card) 10'; Bogdanović 19'; Ivancsics 26'; Szabó (yellow card) 70'; Mogyorósi (yellow card) 78' | Stadium: Illovszky Rudolf Stadion; Attendance: 4,000; Referee: Péter Solymosi; Assistant referees: Tibor Vígh, István Tóth; Fourth official: Gábor Oláh |
Note: Honvéd won 2–1 on aggregate.

== Statistics ==
=== Overall ===
Appearances (Apps) numbers are for appearances in competitive games only, including sub appearances.
Source: Competitions

| No. | Player | Pos. | Nemzeti Bajnokság I | | | | Magyar Kupa | | | | Total | | | |
| No. | Player | Pos. | Apps | Goal | Booked | Sent off (straight red) | Apps | Goal | Booked | Sent off (straight red) | Apps | Goal | Booked | Sent off (straight red) |
|---|---|---|---|---|---|---|---|---|---|---|---|---|---|---|
| 1 | (Hungary) Csaba Borszéki | GK | 2 | | | | 2 | | | | 4 | | | |
| 2 | (Hungary) Dániel Kollár | DF | | | | | | | | | | | | |
| 4 | (Hungary) Balázs Mogyoróssy | DF | 1 | | | 1 | 1 | | | | 2 | | | 1 |
| 5 | (Hungary) Péter Pandur | DF | 27 | 4 | 5 | | 8 | 1 | 2 | | 35 | 5 | 7 | |
| 6 | (Hungary) Zoltán Pintér | MF | 22 | | 9 | 1 | 5 | | 3 | | 27 | | 12 | 1 |
| 7 | (Hungary) Károly Kiss | FW | 20 | 1 | 1 | | 8 | | 1 | | 28 | 1 | 2 | |
| 8 | (Hungary) Norbert Németh | MF | 29 | 9 | 4 | | 6 | 2 | | | 35 | 11 | 4 | |
| 10 | (Hungary) Árpád Majoros | MF | 24 | | | | 4 | | | | 28 | | | |
| 11 | (Hungary) János Lázok | MF | 28 | 9 | 4 | | 7 | 6 | 2 | | 35 | 15 | 6 | |
| 12 | (Hungary) Ádám Bogdán | GK | | | | | | | | | | | | |
| 13 | (Hungary) Tamás Skita | FW | 14 | 1 | 1 | | 5 | 2 | | | 19 | 3 | 1 | |
| 14 | (Hungary) Tamás Tandari | MF | 9 | | | | 3 | | | | 12 | | | |
| 16 | (Hungary) Csaba Ködöböcz | MF | 16 | | 2 | | 7 | 1 | | | 23 | 1 | 2 | |
| 17 | (Hungary) Péter Odrobéna | MF | 15 | | 1 | | 6 | 2 | 2 | | 21 | 2 | 3 | |
| 18 | (Hungary) Tamás Nagy | FW | 17 | 2 | 3 | | 6 | 2 | 1 | | 23 | 4 | 4 | |
| 19 | (Hungary) Zoltán Fehér | DF | 19 | | 5 | | 7 | | 2 | | 26 | | 7 | |
| 20 | (Hungary) Krisztián Kenesei | FW | 9 | 5 | 2 | | 4 | 3 | | | 13 | 8 | 2 | |
| 20 | (Hungary) Zsolt Nagy | FW | 10 | | 1 | | 3 | | | | 13 | | 1 | |
| 21 | (Hungary) András Tóth | DF | 20 | 2 | 6 | | 4 | | 1 | | 24 | 2 | 7 | |
| 22 | (Hungary) Ákos Harnisch | MF | 1 | | | | 1 | | | | 2 | | | |
| 23 | (Hungary) Péter Kincses | MF | 29 | 7 | 3 | | 8 | 1 | | | 37 | 8 | 3 | |
| 25 | (Hungary) Gábor Kovács | DF | 11 | 1 | 2 | | 5 | | | | 16 | 1 | 2 | |
| 27 | (Hungary) Zsolt Balog | DF | 18 | | 2 | | 5 | 1 | 1 | | 23 | 1 | 3 | |
| 28 | (Poland) Mariusz Unierzyski | DF | 23 | 1 | 4 | | 5 | | | | 28 | 1 | 4 | |
| 29 | (Hungary) Péter Bali | FW | 14 | 1 | 1 | | 4 | 1 | 1 | | 18 | 2 | 2 | |
| 31 | (Hungary) Roland Mundi | MF | 1 | | | | | | | | 1 | | | |
| 32 | (Hungary) József Piller | MF | 10 | | 1 | | 4 | | 1 | | 14 | | 2 | |
| 33 | (Hungary) Gábor Németh | GK | 28 | | 1 | | 7 | | 1 | | 35 | | 2 | |
| Own goals | | | | | | | | | | | | | | |
| Totals | | | | 43 | 58 | 2 | | 22 | 18 | | | 65 | 76 | 2 |

=== Hat-tricks ===
| No. | Player | Against | Result | Date | Competition |
|---|---|---|---|---|---|
| 11 | (Hungary) János Lázok | Somosi (A) | 3–0 | 30 August 2006 | Magyar Kupa |

=== Clean sheets ===
| | | | Clean sheets | | |
| No. | Player | Games Played | Nemzeti Bajnokság I | Magyar Kupa | Total |
|---|---|---|---|---|---|
| 33 | (Hungary) Gábor Németh | 35 | 8 | 3 | 11 |
| 1 | (Hungary) Csaba Borszéki | 4 | 1 | 1 | 2 |
| 12 | (Hungary) Ádám Bogdán | | | | |
| Totals | | | 9 | 4 | 13 |
