= 2007–08 Vasas SC season =

Vasas
2007–08 season
- Manager: Géza Mészöly
- Stadium: Illovszky Rudolf Stadion (Home stadium); Promontor utcai Stadion (Note: The Ligakupa match against MTK was played at the Promontor utcai Stadion in Budapest, instead of Vasas regular stadium, the Illovszky Rudolf Stadion in Budapest.); Haraszti út (Note: The Ligakupa match against Diósgyőr was played at the Haraszti út in Budapest, instead of Vasas regular stadium, the Illovszky Rudolf Stadion in Budapest.) (Temporary stadiums)
- Nemzeti Bajnokság I: 9th
- Magyar Kupa: Quarter-finals
- Ligakupa: Autumn season: Group stage Spring season: Group stage
- Highest home attendance: 4,000 v Újpest (31 March 2008, Nemzeti Bajnokság I)
- Lowest home attendance: 150 v MTK (16 February 2008, Ligakupa)
- Average home league attendance: 1,947
- Biggest win: 10–0 v Hatvan (Away, 5 September 2007, Magyar Kupa)
- Biggest defeat: 0–7 v Újpest (Home, 8 December 2007, Ligakupa)

The 2007–08 season was Vasas Sport Club's 80th competitive season, 4th consecutive season in the Nemzeti Bajnokság I and 102nd season in existence as a football club. In addition to the domestic league, Vasas participated in that season's editions of the Magyar Kupa and the Ligakupa.

== Squad ==
Squad at end of season

Note: Flags indicate national team as defined under FIFA eligibility rules; some limited exceptions apply. Players may hold more than one non-FIFA nationality.

No.	Pos.	Nation	Player
2	DF	HUN	Balázs Villám
4	DF	HUN	Márton Kiss
5	DF	HUN	Péter Pandur
6	DF	SRB	Nenad Nikolić
7	FW	HUN	Károly Kiss
8	MF	HUN	Norbert Németh
9	MF	HUN	Balázs Tóth B.
10	MF	SRB	Čedomir Pavičević
11	MF	HUN	János Lázok
17	FW	SVK	Martin Bielik
19	FW	SRB	Petar Divić
20	MF	GAB	Thierry Issiémou

No.	Pos.	Nation	Player
21	DF	HUN	András Tóth
23	MF	HUN	Péter Kincses
25	MF	HUN	Balázs Tóth
26	GK	HUN	Csaba Borszéki
27	DF	HUN	Zsolt Balog
28	DF	POL	Mariusz Unierzyski
29	FW	HUN	László Szűcs
30	MF	HUN	Thomas Sowunmi
32	MF	HUN	József Piller
33	GK	HUN	Gábor Németh
37	FW	HUN	Zoltán Jovánczai
38	FW	SEN	Jean Adrien Sagna

== Competitions ==
=== Overview ===
Competition	First match	Last match	Starting round	Final position	Record							
Competition	First match	Last match	Starting round	Final position	Pld	W	D	L	GF	GA	GD	Win %
Nemzeti Bajnokság I	20 July 2007	30 May 2008	Matchday 1	9th	30	12	5	13	41	45	−4	40.00
Magyar Kupa	5 September 2007	25 March 2008	Third round	Quarter-finals	6	5	0	1	23	4	+19	83.33
Ligakupa (Autumn season)	15 August 2007	10 October 2007	Group stage	Group stage	6	1	1	4	5	11	−6	16.67
Ligakupa (Spring season)	1 December 2007	27 February 2008	Group stage	Group stage	6	2	1	3	9	16	−7	33.33
Total					48	20	7	21	78	76	+2	41.67

Source: Competitions

=== Nemzeti Bajnokság I ===
==== League table ====
Pos	Team	Pld	W	D	L	GF	GA	GD	Pts	Qualification or relegation
7	Zalaegerszeg	30	13	7	10	55	39	+16	46	
8	Honvéd	30	12	7	11	45	36	+9	43	Qualification for Intertoto Cup first round
9	Vasas	30	12	5	13	41	45	−4	41	
10	Nyíregyháza	30	11	7	12	34	37	−3	40	
11	Paks	30	9	10	11	51	51	0	37	

Source: soccerway.com

==== Results summary ====
Overall								Home						Away					
Pld	W	D	L	GF	GA	GD	Pts	W	D	L	GF	GA	GD	W	D	L	GF	GA	GD
30	12	5	13	41	45	−4	41	6	3	6	17	19	−2	6	2	7	24	26	−2

Source: Hungarian Football Federation

==== Matches ====
20 July 2007 1	Vasas	3–1	Tatabánya	Budapest
19:00 CEST (UTC+2)	N. Németh 4'; Kenesei 12'; Balog (yellow card) 42'; A. Tóth (yellow card) 68'; Odrobéna 78'	Report	Poleksić (yellow card) 10'; Kriston 14', (yellow card) 46'; Dienes (yellow card) 40'; Megyesi (yellow card) 47'	Stadium: Illovszky Rudolf Stadion; Attendance: 2,500; Referee: Sándor Andó-Szabó; Assistant referees: Tibor Vígh, Zoltán Szalai; Fourth official: József Erdős

30 July 2007 2	Rákospalota	2–0	Vasas	Budapest
18:00 CEST (UTC+2)	Erős (yellow card) 29'; Cseri (yellow card) 33'; Madar 44'; Kőhalmi 79'; Torma (red card) 84'	Report	A. Tóth (yellow card) 57'	Stadium: Budai II. László Stadion; Attendance: 1,100; Referee: István Mészáros; Assistant referees: László Viszokai, Vencel Tóth II; Fourth official: Gábor Oláh

4 August 2007 3	Vasas	2–0	Sopron	Budapest
19:00 CEST (UTC+2)	Lázok 58'; Somorjai 86'	Report	Csikós (yellow card) 13'; Fehér (yellow card) 37'; Z. Pintér (yellow card) 43'; Sifter (yellow card) 76'; Freud (yellow card) 90'	Stadium: Illovszky Rudolf Stadion; Attendance: 2,500; Referee: Tamás Arany; Assistant referees: Attila Kelemen, Gyula Fehér; Fourth official: László Varga

11 August 2007 4	Fehérvár	5–2	Vasas	Székesfehérvár
19:00 CEST (UTC+2)	Sitku 7', 33'; Dajić 24'; B. Farkas (yellow card) 45', (goal) 60'; D. Nagy (yellow card) 45'; Božić 76'; G. Horváth II (yellow card) 83'	Report	Balog (yellow card) 15'; Pavičević (yellow card) 21'; Rebryk 29'; G. Kovács (red card) 32'; Kincses (yellow card) 43'; Lázok 83'; K. Kiss (yellow card) 90'	Stadium: Sóstói Stadion; Attendance: 1,500; Referee: Péter Solymosi; Assistant referees: Dr. Péter Kovács, Gábor Takács; Fourth official: Imre Schnellbach

20 August 2007 5	Vasas	3–2	Paks	Budapest
18:00 CEST (UTC+2)	N. Németh 70'; A. Tóth (red card) 75'; Lázok 83'; Tandari 88'	Report	S. Horváth (yellow card) 18'; Heffler 40', (yellow card) 85'; Molnár (yellow card) 51'; F. Horváth 65'; Böde (yellow card) 70'; Márkus (yellow card) 78'	Stadium: Illovszky Rudolf Stadion; Attendance: 1,500; Referee: Zoltán Iványi; Assistant referees: Zsolt Szpisják, János Medovarszki; Fourth official: Attila Hegedűs

27 August 2007 6	Újpest	1–1	Vasas	Budapest
18:00 CEST (UTC+2)	Z. Kovács I 62'	Report	Tóth B. (yellow card) 58'; Tandari 66'	Stadium: Szusza Ferenc Stadion; Attendance: 3,596; Referee: Tamás Arany; Assistant referees: Tibor Vámos, Dr. Zsolt Varga; Fourth official: Róbert Nagy

31 August 2007 7	Vasas	0–0	Diósgyőr	Budapest
19:00 CEST (UTC+2)		Report	Katona (yellow card) 63'; Vitelki (yellow card) 68'; N. Farkas (yellow card) 78'	Stadium: Illovszky Rudolf Stadion; Attendance: 2,500; Referee: Roland Veizer; Assistant referees: Zoltán Kovács, Szabolcs Deutsch; Fourth official: Ádám Németh

14 September 2007 8	Debrecen	2–0	Vasas	Debrecen
19:00 CEST (UTC+2)	Takács (yellow card) 29'; Komlósi 43', (yellow card) 48'; Kerekes 88'	Report	Tandari (yellow card) 41'; Pavičević (red card) 50'; A. Tóth (yellow card) 70'	Stadium: Oláh Gábor utcai Stadion; Attendance: 5,000; Referee: József Berger; Assistant referees: János Medovarszki, Attila Forgács; Fourth official: Attila Hegedűs

24 September 2007 9	Vasas	0–0	Siófok	Budapest
18:00 CEST (UTC+2)	Unierzyski (red card) 90+1'	Report	Csopaki (yellow card) 74'; Miklósvári (yellow card) 86'	Stadium: Illovszky Rudolf Stadion; Attendance: 1,500; Referee: Zsolt Szabó; Assistant referees: Róbert Kispál, Zoltán Szalai; Fourth official: Ádám Németh

28 September 2007 10	Zalaegerszeg	3–3	Vasas	Zalaegerszeg
19:00 CEST (UTC+2)	B. Molnár (yellow card) 8'; Méyé 15', 76' (pen.); Vulin (yellow card) 43'; N. Tóth 67' (pen.)	Report	A. Tóth 26', 84'; N. Németh (yellow card) 42'; B. Tóth (yellow card) 77'; Sowunmi 81'; Balog (yellow card) 88'; Lázok (yellow card) 90+4'	Stadium: ZTE Arena; Attendance: 3,000; Referee: István Mészáros; Assistant referees: László Viszokai, Zoltán Kis; Fourth official: Csaba Pintér

8 October 2007 11	Vasas	0–3	MTK	Budapest
18:00 CEST (UTC+2)	Pavičević (yellow card) 72'; Unierzyski (red card) 75'	Report	Kulcsár 9', 41'; Pátkai 62'	Stadium: Illovszky Rudolf Stadion; Attendance: 1,800; Referee: Mihály Fábián; Assistant referees: Dr. Zsolt Varga, István Tóth; Fourth official: László Csaba

20 October 2007 12	Kaposvár	1–0	Vasas	Kaposvár
18:00 CEST (UTC+2)	Oláh 57'; Grúz (yellow card) 64'; Zahorecz (yellow card) 90+3'	Report	A. Tóth (yellow card) 47'; Mundi (yellow card) 53'	Stadium: Rákóczi Stadion; Attendance: 3,000; Referee: Ferenc Bede; Assistant referees: Balázs Farkas, Zsolt Butkai; Fourth official: István Kelemen

2 November 2007 13	Vasas	0–2	Honvéd	Budapest
19:00 CET (UTC+1)	Pandur (yellow card) 45'; Kincses (yellow card) 65'	Report	Guié 50'; Hercegfalvi 71'	Stadium: Illovszky Rudolf Stadion; Attendance: 3,000; Referee: Zoltán Iványi; Assistant referees: Dr. Ádám Vári, Zoltán Szalai; Fourth official: József Erdős

10 November 2007 14	Vasas	1–1	Győr	Budapest
16:00 CET (UTC+1)	N. Németh 84' (pen.)	Report	Koltai 79'	Stadium: Illovszky Rudolf Stadion; Attendance: 700; Referee: Viktor Kassai; Assistant referees: Zsolt Szpisják, Tibor Vámos; Fourth official: István Kelemen

24 November 2007 15	Nyíregyháza	2–1	Vasas	Nyíregyháza
13:00 CET (UTC+1)	N. Szilágyi 30'; Montvai 82'; Perenyi (yellow card) 84'; Miskolczi (red card) 90+2'	Report	N. Németh 39'; A. Tóth (yellow card) 88'; Pandur (red card) 90+2'	Stadium: Városi Stadion; Attendance: 3,000; Referee: István Vad; Assistant referees: Attila Kelemen, Gyula Fehér; Fourth official: Tibor Gyarmati II

23 February 2008 16	Tatabánya	0–2	Vasas	Budapest (Note: The matches of Tatabánya were played at the Szőnyi úti Stadion in Budapest in the second half of the season behind closed doors, instead of their regular stadium, the Városi Stadion in Tatabánya, which did not meet HFF requirements.)
16:00 CET (UTC+1)	Kichi (red card) 24'; Dienes (yellow card) 71'; Megyesi (yellow card) 81'	Report	N. Németh 10'; Pavičević (yellow card) 39'; Divić (yellow card) 65'; Lázok 70'	Stadium: Szőnyi úti Stadion; Attendance: 600; Referee: Szabolcs Szilasi; Assistant referees: Gábor Takács, Oszkár Lémon; Fourth official: J. Zoltán Kovács
Note: The Budapest Metropolitan Police reviewed its earlier decision and allowed 600 spectators to attend the match.

3 March 2008 17	Vasas	2–1	Rákospalota	Budapest
18:00 CET (UTC+1)	Piller 9'; Unierzyski (yellow card) 40'; Lázok (yellow card) 41'; A. Tóth (yellow card) 56'; Divić 59'; B. Tóth (yellow card) 83'	Report	Cseri (red card) 30'; Erős (yellow card) 42'; Kapcsos (yellow card) 50'; Torma 62'	Stadium: Illovszky Rudolf Stadion; Attendance: 2,000; Referee: Zsolt Szabó; Assistant referees: Róbert Kispál, Gábor Erős; Fourth official: Gergő Király

8 March 2008 18	Sopron	0–3 (awd.)	Vasas	Sopron
		Report		Stadium: Káposztás utcai Stadion
Note: After the exclusion of Sopron, the matches were registered with a goal difference of 3–0.

15 March 2008 19	Vasas	1–2	Fehérvár	Budapest
16:00 CET (UTC+1)	N. Németh 62'	Report	Sitku 41'; Lázár (yellow card) 45'; D. Nagy (yellow card) 56'; G. Horváth II (yellow card) 71'; Sifter (yellow card) 82'; Koller 87'	Stadium: Illovszky Rudolf Stadion; Attendance: 2,800; Referee: Roland Veizer; Assistant referees: Gyula Fehér, Péter Berettyán; Fourth official: László Varga

22 March 2008 20	Paks	3–0	Vasas	Paks
16:00 CET (UTC+1)	Böde 25'; Zováth 53'; Tököli 75'	Report	A. Tóth (red card) 65'; Füzi (red card) 85'	Stadium: Fehérvári úti Stadion; Attendance: 1,200; Referee: Tamás Arany; Assistant referees: László Viszokai, István Iványi; Fourth official: Csaba Ursprung

31 March 2008 21	Vasas	0–1	Újpest	Budapest
18:00 CEST (UTC+2)	Piller (yellow card) 22'; Ne. Nikolić (yellow card) 40'; Pavičević (yellow card) 57'	Report	Tisza 66', (yellow card) 81'	Stadium: Illovszky Rudolf Stadion; Attendance: 4,000; Referee: Mihály Fábián; Assistant referees: Dr. Zsolt Varga, Zoltán Pápai; Fourth official: Róbert Nagy

5 April 2008 22	Diósgyőr	4–5	Vasas	Miskolc
19:00 CEST (UTC+2)	Honma 21'; A. Simon 44'; Cardozo (yellow card) 75'; Köteles (red card) 82'; Lipusz 89'; Elek 90'	Report	Kincses 26'; Pavičević 41', (yellow card) 72'; Sowunmi 59'; N. Németh 74', 83'; Jovánczai (yellow card) 90+1'	Stadium: Diósgyőri Stadion; Attendance: 5,000; Referee: Viktor Kassai; Assistant referees: Gábor Erős, Tibor Vámos; Fourth official: József Erdős

11 April 2008 23	Vasas	0–3	Debrecen	Budapest
19:00 CEST (UTC+2)	Pavičević (yellow card) 22'; N. Németh (yellow card) 69'; A. Tóth (red card) 83'; Piller (yellow card) 86'	Report	Kouemaha 9'; Leandro 24'; Huszák (yellow card) 34'; Czvitkovics 71'	Stadium: Illovszky Rudolf Stadion; Attendance: 1,200; Referee: Zoltán Iványi; Assistant referees: Zsolt Szpisják, István Albert; Fourth official: Attla Hegedűs

19 April 2008 24	Siófok	1–3	Vasas	Siófok
19:00 CEST (UTC+2)	Sütő (yellow card) 27'; Gajda 72'; Ambrus (red card) 76'; Forgács (yellow card) 78'; Magasföldi (yellow card) 88'	Report	N. Németh 1', 13'; G. Németh (yellow card) 72'; Lázok 77' (pen.)	Stadium: Révész Géza utcai Stadion; Attendance: 300; Referee: Krisztián Király; Assistant referees: Szabolcs Deutsch, Balázs Huszár; Fourth official: Norbert Kiss

25 April 2008 25	Vasas	1–0	Zalaegerszeg	Budapest
19:00 CEST (UTC+2)	Balog (yellow card) 41'; Kincses 63', (yellow card) 63'; Unierzyski (yellow card) 68'	Report	Vlaszák (yellow card) 8'; Pekič (yellow card) 85'; P. Máté I (yellow card) 86'	Stadium: Illovszky Rudolf Stadion; Attendance: 1,000; Referee: Gergely Sulyok; Assistant referees: Tibor Vámos, Zsolt Butkai; Fourth official: Gábor Oláh

3 May 2008 26	MTK	0–2	Vasas	Budapest
15:00 CEST (UTC+2)		Report	Pavičević (yellow card) 45', (goal) 61'; N. Németh (yellow card) 68'; Divić 90+2'	Stadium: Hidegkuti Nándor Stadion; Attendance: 1,500; Referee: Viktor Kassai; Assistant referees: Dr. Zsolt Varga, Zoltán Pápai; Fourth official: Róbert Nagy

10 May 2008 27	Vasas	1–2	Kaposvár	Budapest
19:00 CEST (UTC+2)	Lázok 33'	Report	Maróti (yellow card) 15'; Alves 17'; Oláh 67'	Stadium: Illovszky Rudolf Stadion; Attendance: 1,000; Referee: Ádám Németh; Assistant referees: Zoltán Szalai, István Tóth; Fourth official: Gergő Janitz

19 May 2008 28	Honvéd	0–1	Vasas	Budapest
18:00 CEST (UTC+2)	Takács (yellow card) 16'; Angoua (yellow card) 42'; Smiljanić (yellow card) 90+2'	Report	Pavičević (yellow card) 13'; Pandur 25'; B. Tóth (yellow card) 72'	Stadium: Bozsik József Stadion; Attendance: 1,120; Referee: István Vad; Assistant referees: György Ring, Balázs Farkas; Fourth official: Gábor Oláh

25 May 2008 29	Győr	2–1	Vasas	Győr
18:00 CEST (UTC+2)	Jäkl (yellow card) 56'; Bajzát 65'; Józsi 89'	Report	N. Németh 58'; Piller (yellow card) 61'	Stadium: ETO Park; Attendance: 6,000; Referee: József Berger; Assistant referees: Attila Forgács, Gábor Kormányos II; Fourth official: Ferenc Szöllősi

30 May 2008 30	Vasas	3–1	Nyíregyháza	Budapest
19:00 CEST (UTC+2)	Lázok 53'; Pandur 70'; Németh 90'	Report	Lippai 45'; T. Hegedűs (yellow card) 68'; Lăzăreanu (yellow card) 70'	Stadium: Illovszky Rudolf Stadion; Attendance: 1,200; Referee: Zoltán Iványi; Assistant referees: István Albert, János Medovarszki; Fourth official: Attila Hegedűs

=== Magyar Kupa ===
5 September 2007 Third round	Hatvan	0–10	Vasas	Hatvan
17:00 CEST (UTC+2)	S. Nagy (yellow card) 52'; P. Tóth (yellow card) 84'	Report	K. Kiss 5'; Lázok 25', 40'; Rebryk 35', 69'; Tandari 37', (yellow card) 52'; N. Németh 55', 58'; Mundi 78'; Kincses 83'	Stadium: Népkert Sporttelep; Attendance: 600; Referee: János Takács; Assistant referees: L. Tóth L., J. Kulcsár

26 September 2007 Round of 32	Cigánd	0–5	Vasas	Cigánd
15:00 CEST (UTC+2)	Janikó (yellow card) 18'; Ocsenás (yellow card) 30'	Report	Skita 9', 86'; M. Kiss (yellow card) 29'; Sowunmi 33', 38'; K. Kiss (yellow card) 68'; Szűcs 76'	Stadium: Cigándi Sportpálya; Attendance: 1,000; Referee: Roland Veizer; Assistant referees: J. Orosz, I. Takács

==== Round of 16 ====
24 October 2007 First leg	Putnok	1–3	Vasas	Putnok
14:30 CEST (UTC+2)	Sápi 2', (yellow card) 59'; Buku (yellow card) 60'	Report	N. Németh 20', (yellow card) 42'; Pavičević (yellow card) 28'; Lázok 38'; Kincses (yellow card) 43'; A. Tóth (yellow card) 53'; Rebryk 85'	Stadium: Várady Béla Sportközpont; Attendance: 600; Referee: Roland Veizer; Assistant referees: Péter Berettyán, Gyula Fehér

7 November 2007 Second leg	Vasas	3–1 (6–2 agg.)	Putnok	Budapest
17:00 CET (UTC+1)	Rebryk 19', (yellow card) 73'; Pandur 79'; N. Németh 86'	Report	Lázár 14'; Buku (yellow card) 87'; P. Márkus (red card) 87'	Stadium: Illovszky Rudolf Stadion; Attendance: 500; Referee: Katalin Kulcsár; Assistant referees: Imre Attila Nagy, Brigitta Makkosné Petz
Note: Vasas won 6–2 on aggregate.

==== Quarter-finals ====
19 March 2008 First leg	Integrál-DAC	0–1	Vasas	Győr
17:00 CET (UTC+1)	Pásztor (yellow card) 46'; Bisoye (yellow card) 57'; Szabadfi (yellow card) 78'; Csikós (yellow card) 88'; Czanik (red card) 90'	Report	N. Németh 9'	Stadium: Nádorvárosi Stadion; Attendance: 500; Referee: István Mészáros; Assistant referees: Gábor Takács, Oszkár Lémon

25 March 2008 Second leg	Vasas	1–2 (2–2 (a) agg.)	Integrál-DAC	Budapest
17:00 CET (UTC+1)	Sowunmi 61'	Report	Ludánszki 22'; Laki 75'	Stadium: Illovszky Rudolf Stadion; Attendance: 700; Referee: Szabolcs Szilasi; Assistant referees: Zoltán Szalai, Zsolt Márton
Note: 2–2 on aggregate. Integrál-DAC won on away goals.

=== Ligakupa ===
==== Autumn season ====
===== Group stage =====
Pos	Team	Pld	W	D	L	GF	GA	GD	Pts	Qualification	DEB	DIO	NYI	VAS
1	Debrecen	6	3	2	1	10	6	+4	11	Advance to knockout phase	—	1–1	3–2	3–0
2	Diósgyőr	6	3	1	2	6	6	0	10	Advance to knockout phase	2–0	—	1–0	2–1
3	Nyíregyháza	6	3	0	3	8	6	+2	9		0–2	1–0	—	4–0
4	Vasas	6	1	1	4	5	11	−6	4		1–1	3–0	0–1	—

Source: HFF

15 August 2007 1	Nyíregyháza	4–0	Vasas	Nyíregyháza
17:00 CEST (UTC+2)	Menougong 3', 48', 64'; N. Szilágyi 20'; Minczér (yellow card) 80'	Report	Tandari (yellow card) 57'; Rebryk (yellow card) 87'	Stadium: Városi Stadion; Attendance: 2,000; Referee: József Berger; Assistant referees: Attila Forgács, Tibor Vígh

22 August 2007 2	Vasas	3–0	Diósgyőr	Budapest
16:00 CEST (UTC+2)	Rebryk 6'; Skita 14'; Bükszegi 24'; M. Balogh (yellow card) 53'; Pandur (yellow card) 60'; Tandari (yellow card) 87'	Report		Stadium: Illovszky Rudolf Stadion; Attendance: 400; Referee: József Erdős; Assistant referees: István Albert, Dr. Ádám Vári

9 September 2007 3	Debrecen	3–0	Vasas	Debrecen
18:00 CEST (UTC+2)	Kerekes 54'; Sidibe 60'; Z. Takács 80', (yellow card) 81'	Report	Rebryk (yellow card) 26'; K. Kiss (yellow card) 30'; Balog (yellow card) 40'	Stadium: Oláh Gábor utcai Stadion; Attendance: 1,500; Referee: Mihály Fábián; Assistant referees: Zoltán Pápai, Tamás Márkus

19 September 2007 4	Vasas	1–1	Debrecen	Budapest
19:00 CEST (UTC+2)	Mundi 22'; Piller (yellow card) 67'	Report	Kouemaha 76'; Z. Nagy (yellow card) 90+1'	Stadium: Illovszky Rudolf Stadion; Attendance: 200; Referee: Péter Solymosi; Assistant referees: Gábor Takács, Oszkár Lémon

3 October 2007 5	Vasas	0–1	Nyíregyháza	Budapest
17:00 CEST (UTC+2)	Rebryk (yellow card) 53'	Report	Miskolczi (yellow card) 44'; Zabos (yellow card) 53'; Rojas 74'	Stadium: Illovszky Rudolf Stadion; Attendance: 500; Referee: Tamás Arany; Assistant referees: Imre Attila Nagy, Roland Schuszter

10 October 2007 6	Diósgyőr	2–1	Vasas	Miskolc
18:00 CEST (UTC+2)	Ebala 39'; Bessong 43'	Report	Sowunmi 21'	Stadium: Diósgyőri Stadion; Attendance: 1,800; Referee: Zoltán Iványi; Assistant referees: István Albert, Gyula Fehér

==== Spring season ====
===== Group stage =====
Pos	Team	Pld	W	D	L	GF	GA	GD	Pts	Qualification	MTK	UJP	VAS	DIO
1	MTK Budapest	6	4	2	0	12	6	+6	14	Advance to knockout phase	—	2–0	3–2	2–1
2	Újpest	6	3	0	3	14	9	+5	9	Advance to knockout phase	1–3	—	1–2	3–1
3	Vasas	6	2	1	3	9	16	−7	7		1–1	0–7	—	4–1
4	Diósgyőr	6	1	1	4	8	12	−4	4		1–1	1–2	3–0	—

Source: HFF

1 December 2007 1	Diósgyőr	3–0	Vasas	Miskolc
13:00 CET (UTC+1)	Lipusz 50', 75'; Huszák 56'	Report		Stadium: Diósgyőri Stadion; Attendance: 300; Referee: Roland Veizer; Assistant referees: Tibor Vígh, János Agócs

5 December 2007 2	MTK	3–2	Vasas	Budapest
18:00 CET (UTC+1)	Bori 11'; Kanta 70', 73'	Report	Mundi 76'; Iheanacho 88'	Stadium: Hidegkuti Nándor Stadion; Attendance: 100; Referee: Tamás Bognár; Assistant referees: Zoltán Kovács, Roland Schuszter

8 December 2007 3	Vasas	0–7	Újpest	Budapest
13:00 CET (UTC+1)	Pandur (yellow card) 26'	Report	Böjte (yellow card) 7'; Kéthévoama 8'; Tisza (yellow card) 13'; Z. Kovács I 18'; Moldovan 29'; Vermes 62'; Korcsmár 69'; O. Nagy 78'; Balog 87' (o.g.)	Stadium: Illovszky Rudolf Stadion; Attendance: 800; Referee: István Mészáros; Assistant referees: László Viszokai, Zoltán Tompos

16 February 2008 4	Vasas	1–1	MTK	Budapest
13:00 CET (UTC+1)	N. Németh (yellow card) 47', (goal) 58'; Pavičević (yellow card) 89'	Report	Kulcsár (yellow card) 59'; J. Kanta 75'	Stadium: Promontor utcai Stadion; Attendance: 150; Referee: Ferenc Bede; Assistant referees: Zoltán Szalai, Zsolt Butkai

19 February 2008 5	Vasas	4–1	Diósgyőr	Budapest
13:00 CET (UTC+1)	Piller 13', 60'; Divić 23'; M. Kiss 35'	Report	Vitelki 54'	Stadium: Haraszti út Attendance: 200; Referee: Tamás Arany; Assistant referees: Balázs Farkas, István Szécsényi

27 February 2008 6	Újpest	1–2	Vasas	Budapest
18:00 CET (UTC+1)	Györök 20'; Regedei (yellow card) 27'; Fűzfa (yellow card) 51'	Report	Unierzyski (yellow card) 19'; Lázok 51', 56'; Issiémou (yellow card) 67'	Stadium: Szusza Ferenc Stadion; Attendance: 1,023; Referee: János Takács; Assistant referees: Vencel Tóth II, Lajos L. Tóth
