= 2011–12 Nemzeti Bajnokság II =

Nemzeti Bajnokság II
- Season: 2011–12
- Champions: MTK Budapest (West); Eger (East)
- Relegated: Budaörs (West); Dunaújváros (West); Budapest Honvéd II (East); Rákospalota (East); Vecsés (East)

The 2011–2012 Nemzeti Bajnokság II was the 114th season of the Nemzeti Bajnokság II, the second tier of the Hungarian football league.

== Eastern group ==
=== Teams ===
Szolnoki MÁV FC and MTK Budapest FC finished the 2010–11 season in the bottom two places of the table and thus were relegated to their respective NB II divisions. MTK ended a 16-year stay in the top league, while Szolnok were relegated after just one year in the league.

The two relegated teams were replaced with the champions of the two 2010–11 NB II groups, Diósgyőri VTK of the East Group and Pécsi MFC of the West Group. Diósgyőr made their immediate comeback to the league, while Pécs returned to the competition after an absence of four seasons.

=== Stadium and locations ===
Location of teams in 2011–12 Nemzeti Bajnokság II

Club	Short name	City	Stadium	Capacity
Balmazújvárosi FC	Balmazújváros	Balmazújváros	Batthyány utcai Sportpálya	2,300
Békéscsaba 1912 Előre SE	Békéscsaba	Békéscsaba	Kórház utcai stadion	10,432
Budapest Honvéd FC II	Honvéd II	Budapest	Bozsik Stadion (Training)	700
Ceglédi VSE	Cegléd	Cegléd	Malomtó széli Stadion	4,000
Debreceni VSC II	Debrecen II	Debrecen	DEAC Stadion	3,200
Egri FC	Eger	Eger	Szentmarjay Tibor Városi Stadion	6,000
Kazincbarcikai SC	Kazincbarcika	Kazincbarcika	Pete András Stadion	3,000
Mezőkövesd-Zsóry SE	Mezőkövesd	Mezőkövesd	Városi Stadion	2,571
Nyíregyháza Spartacus	Nyíregyháza	Nyíregyháza	Városi Stadion	10,300
Orosháza FC	Orosháza	Orosháza	Mátrai- Stadion	3,000
Rákospalotai EAC	REAC	Budapest	Stadion Budai II. Laszló	7,500
Szeged 2011	Szeged	Szeged	Szegedi VSE Stadion	5,000
Szolnoki MÁV FC	Szolnok	Szolnok	Tiszaligeti Stadion	4,000
Újpest FC II	Újpest II	Budapest	Szusza Ferenc Stadium	13,501
Dunakanyar-Vác FC	Vác	Vác	Városi Stadion	9,000
Vecsési FC	Vecsés	Vecsés	Stadion Dózsa György út	3,000

=== League table ===
Pos	Team	Pld	W	D	L	GF	GA	GD	Pts	Promotion or relegation
1	Eger (P)	30	18	5	7	42	26	+16	59	Promotion to Nemzeti Bajnokság I
2	Szolnok	30	17	4	9	55	32	+23	55	
3	Békéscsaba	30	13	12	5	44	30	+14	51	
4	Cegléd	30	14	5	11	46	43	+3	47	
5	Mezőkövesd	30	12	8	10	43	40	+3	44	
6	Orosháza	30	11	11	8	47	39	+8	44	
7	Nyíregyháza	30	10	13	7	50	47	+3	43	
8	Balmazújváros	30	12	6	12	52	40	+12	42	
9	Debrecen II	30	11	9	10	42	41	+1	42	
10	Újpest II	30	11	7	12	46	60	−14	40	
11	Vác	30	11	5	14	44	48	−4	38	
12	Szeged	30	10	7	13	46	43	+3	37	
13	Kazincbarcika	30	10	5	15	32	47	−15	35	
14	Budapest Honvéd II	30	9	7	14	36	44	−8	34	Relegation to Nemzeti Bajnokság III
15	Rákospalota (R)	30	8	7	15	44	61	−17	31	Relegation to Nemzeti Bajnokság III
16	Vecsés (R)	30	3	9	18	21	49	−28	17	Relegation to Nemzeti Bajnokság III

Source: soccerway.com
Rules for classification: 1st points; 2nd overall wins; 3rd goal difference; 4th goals scored
(P) Promoted; (R) Relegated

== Western group ==
Pos	Team	Pld	W	D	L	GF	GA	GD	Pts	Promotion or relegation
1	MTK Budapest (P)	30	21	6	3	67	20	+47	67 (Note: MTK Budapest were deducted 2 points.)	Promotion to Nemzeti Bajnokság I and qualification to Europa League first qualifying round (Note: As the 2011–12 Hungarian Cup winners, Debrecen qualified for the Champions League that year, their Europa League berth was carried down to finalists, MTK Budapest.)
2	Kozármisleny	30	17	4	9	50	30	+20	55	
3	Gyirmót	30	15	7	8	50	43	+7	52	
4	Ajka	30	14	8	8	48	34	+14	50	
5	Tatabánya	30	15	6	9	50	34	+16	49 (Note: Tatabánya were deducted 2 points.)	
6	Veszprém	30	13	8	9	44	37	+7	47	
7	Szigetszentmiklós	30	12	9	9	52	38	+14	45	
8	Videoton II	30	10	11	9	38	35	+3	41	
9	Baja	30	10	7	13	46	50	−4	37	
10	Ferencváros II	30	10	6	14	46	54	−8	36	
11	BKV Előre	30	9	8	13	32	45	−13	35	
12	Paksi II	30	7	10	13	27	41	−14	31	
13	Győri ETO II	30	7	9	14	37	49	−12	30	
14	Soproni VSE	30	7	9	14	28	52	−24	30	
15	Dunaújváros (R)	30	8	4	18	25	58	−33	28	Relegation to Nemzeti Bajnokság III
16	Budaörs (R)	30	7	4	19	37	57	−20	25	Relegation to Nemzeti Bajnokság III

Source: soccerway.com
Rules for classification: 1st points; 2nd overall wins; 3rd goal difference; 4th goals scored
(P) Promoted; (R) Relegated

== See also ==
- 2011–12 Magyar Kupa
- 2011–12 Nemzeti Bajnokság I
- 2011–12 Nemzeti Bajnokság III
