= Csaba Ködöböcz =

Hungarian footballer (born 1985)

Personal information
- Date of birth: 19 July 1985 (age 41)
- Place of birth: Budapest, Hungary
- Height: 1.79 m (5 ft 10 in)
- Position: Midfielder

Youth career
- –2003: Vasas

Senior career*
Years	Team	Apps	(Gls)
2002–2006	Vasas	32	(1)
2005	→ Budakalász (loan)	14	(1)
2006	Felcsút	6	(3)
2006–2007	Vasas	16	(0)
2007–2008	Sopron	9	(0)
2007	Sopron II	5	(0)
2008	Liberty Salonta		
2008–2009	Békéscsaba	6	(1)
2009–2011	Vecsés	30	(6)
2011–2012	Tatabánya	8	(0)
2012–2013	Rákospalota	1	(0)
2013	III. Kerület	6	(0)
2013–2015	Üröm	21	(4)
Total		154	(16)

International career
2000	Hungary U14	2	(0)
2000–2001	Hungary U15	11	(2)
2001–2002	Hungary U17	12	(0)
2002	Hungary U18	4	(0)
- * Club domestic league appearances and goals

Csaba Ködöböcz (born 19 July 1985) is a Hungarian former professional footballer who played as a midfielder.

== Club career ==
In the first half of the 2005–06 season, Ködöböcz was loaned from Nemzeti Bajnokság I club Vasas to Nemzeti Bajnokság II club Budakalász. In the second half of the same season, he moved to fellow Nemzeti Bajnokság II club Felcsút before returning to Vasas for the following season on 25 July 2006.

== International career ==
Ködöböcz is a former youth international who was part of the Hungary under-17 squad that participated in the 2002 UEFA European Under-17 Championship.

== Career statistics ==
=== Club ===
Appearances and goals by club, season and competition
Club	Season	League			Magyar Kupa		Ligakupa		Other		Total	
Club	Season	Division	Apps	Goals	Apps	Goals	Apps	Goals	Apps	Goals	Apps	Goals
Vasas	2002–03	Nemzeti Bajnokság II	1	0	—		—		—		1	0
Vasas	2003–04	Nemzeti Bajnokság II	15	1	2	0	—		—		17	1
Vasas	2004–05	Nemzeti Bajnokság I	16	0	1	0	—		—		17	0
Vasas	Total		32	1	3	0	—		—		35	1
Budakalász (loan)	2005–06	Nemzeti Bajnokság II	14	1	—		—		—		14	1
Felcsút	2005–06	Nemzeti Bajnokság II	6	3	—		—		—		6	3
Vasas	2006–07	Nemzeti Bajnokság I	16	0	8	1	—		—		24	1
Sopron	2007–08	Nemzeti Bajnokság I	9	0	2	0	5	0	—		16	0
Sopron II	2007–08	Nemzeti Bajnokság III	5	0	—		—		—		5	0
Békéscsaba	2008–09	Nemzeti Bajnokság II	6	1	2	1	—		—		8	2
Vecsés	2008–09	Nemzeti Bajnokság II	14	1	—		—		—		14	1
Vecsés	2009–10	Nemzeti Bajnokság II	16	5	2	0	—		—		18	5
Vecsés	Total		30	6	2	0	—		—		32	6
Tatabánya	2010–11	Nemzeti Bajnokság II	8	0	—		—		—		8	0
Rákospalota	2011–12	Nemzeti Bajnokság II	1	0	—		—		—		1	0
III. Kerület	2012–13	Nemzeti Bajnokság III	6	0	—		—		1 (Note: Appearance in Magyar Kupa qualifying rounds)	0	7	0
Üröm	2013–14	Megyei Bajnokság II	8	2	—		—		—		8	2
Üröm	2014–15	Megyei Bajnokság II	13	2	—		—		—		13	2
Üröm	2015–16	Megyei Bajnokság II	0	0	—		—		—		0	0
Üröm	Total		21	4	—		—		—		21	4
Career total			154	16	17	2	5	0	1	0	177	18

=== International ===
Appearances and goals by national team and year
Team	Year	Total	
Team	Year	Apps	Goals
Hungary U14	2000	2	0
Hungary U15	2000	6	2
Hungary U15	2001	5	0
Hungary U15	Total	11	2
Hungary U17	2001	10	0
Hungary U17	2002	2	0
Hungary U17	Total	12	0
Hungary U18	2002	4	0
Career total		29	2

Scores and results list Hungary's goal tally first, score column indicates score after each Ködöböcz goal.

List of youth international goals scored by Csaba Ködöböcz
No.	Team	Cap	Date	Venue	Opponent	Score	Result	Competition	Ref.
1	Hungary U15	1	30 August 2000	Harkányi Városi Sporttelep, Harkány, Hungary	Croatia U15	1–0	1–0	Friendly	
2	Hungary U15	3	19 September 2000	Blansko, Czech Republic	Czech Republic U15	2–1	2–1	Friendly	
