= Károly Kiss =

Károly Kiss may refer to:

- Károly Kiss (footballer) (born 1985), Hungarian footballer
- Károly Kiss (politician) (1903–1983), Hungarian politician
