= Károly Kiss (footballer) =

Hungarian footballer (born 1985)

Personal information
- Date of birth: 24 January 1985 (age 41)
- Place of birth: Budapest, Hungary
- Height: 1.75 m (5 ft 9 in)
- Position: Midfielder

Team information
- Current team: Cso-Ki Sport
- Number: 27

Youth career
- Újpest
- –2004: Vasas

Senior career*
Years	Team	Apps	(Gls)
2004–2005	Putnok		
2005–2006	Vecsés	27	(3)
2006–2008	Vasas	30	(1)
2007–2008	Vasas II	7	(1)
2008–2009	Szolnok	27	(2)
2009–2011	Vecsés	48	(4)
2011–2012	Rákospalota	28	(1)
2012–2013	Szigetszentmiklós	11	(0)
2013	Soroksár	11	(3)
2013–2014	Rákospalota	5	(1)
2014	Jászapáti	11	(1)
2014–2015	Salgótarján	12	(3)
2015–2016	Jászberény	24	(5)
2016	BKV Előre	14	(1)
2016–2017	Tatabánya	17	(12)
2017–2020	Komárom	62	(27)
2020–2021	Ráckeve	23	(13)
2021–2024	Bánk-Dalnoki	78	(69)
2022	Bánk-Dalnoki II	0	(0)
2024–2026	Kistarcsa	37	(18)
2026–	Cso-Ki Sport	11	(3)
- * Club domestic league appearances and goals as of 9 May 2026

Károly Kiss (born 24 January 1985) is a Hungarian professional footballer who plays as a midfielder for Megyei Bajnokság I club Cso-Ki Sport.

== Career statistics ==
As of match played 9 May 2026

Appearances and goals by club, season and competition
Club	Season	League			Magyar Kupa		Ligakupa		Other		Total	
Club	Season	Division	Apps	Goals	Apps	Goals	Apps	Goals	Apps	Goals	Apps	Goals
Putnok	2004–05	Nemzeti Bajnokság III			—		—		2 (Note: Appearances in Nemzeti Bajnokság III promotion play-offs)	1	2	1
Vecsés	2005–06	Nemzeti Bajnokság II	27	3	1	0	—		—		28	3
Vasas	2006–07	Nemzeti Bajnokság I	20	1	8	0	—		—		28	1
Vasas	2007–08	Nemzeti Bajnokság I	10	0	4	1	8	0	—		22	1
Vasas	Total		30	1	12	1	8	0	—		50	2
Vasas II	2007–08	Nemzeti Bajnokság III	7	1	—		—		—		7	1
Szolnok	2008–09	Nemzeti Bajnokság II	27	2	2	3	—		—		29	5
Vecsés	2009–10	Nemzeti Bajnokság II	21	0	2	0	—		—		23	0
Vecsés	2010–11	Nemzeti Bajnokság II	27	4	1	1	—		—		28	5
Vecsés	Total		48	4	3	1	—		—		51	5
Rákospalota	2011–12	Nemzeti Bajnokság II	28	1	2	0	—		—		30	1
Szigetszentmiklós	2012–13	Nemzeti Bajnokság II	11	0	2	0	—		—		13	0
Soroksár	2012–13	Nemzeti Bajnokság III	11	3	—		—		4 (Note: Two appearances in Magyar Kupa qualifying rounds, two appearances in Nemzeti Bajnokság III promotion play-offs)	0	15	3
Rákospalota	2013–14	Nemzeti Bajnokság III	5	1	—		—		—		5	1
Jászapáti	2013–14	Nemzeti Bajnokság III	11	1	—		—		—		11	1
Salgótarján	2013–14	Megyei Bajnokság I	—		—		—		1 (Note: Appearance in Nógrád Szuperkupa)	0	1	0
Salgótarján	2014–15	Nemzeti Bajnokság III	12	3	3	0	—		—		15	3
Salgótarján	Total		12	3	3	0	—		1	0	16	3
Jászberény	2014–15	Nemzeti Bajnokság III	11	1	—		—		—		11	1
Jászberény	2015–16	Nemzeti Bajnokság III	13	4	—		—		—		13	4
Jászberény	Total		24	5	—		—		—		24	5
BKV Előre	2015–16	Nemzeti Bajnokság III	14	1	—		—		—		14	1
Tatabánya	2016–17	Nemzeti Bajnokság III	17	12	—		—		—		17	12
Komárom	2016–17	Nemzeti Bajnokság III	12	1	—		—		—		12	1
Komárom	2017–18	Megyei Bajnokság I	27	25	1	0	—		10 (Note: Three appearances in Magyar Kupa qualifying rounds, five appearances and four goals in Komárom-Esztergom Megyei Kupa, two appearances in Megyei Bajnokság I promotion play-offs)	4	38	29
Komárom	2018–19	Nemzeti Bajnokság III	16	1	1	0	—		—		17	1
Komárom	2019–20	Nemzeti Bajnokság III	7	0	1	0	—		—		8	0
Komárom	Total		62	27	3	0	—		10	4	75	31
Ráckeve	2020–21	Megyei Bajnokság II	23	13	1	0	—		5 (Note: Two appearances and one goal in Magyar Kupa qualifying rounds, three appearances and one goal in Pest Megyei Kupa)	2	29	15
Bánk-Dalnoki	2021–22	Megyei Bajnokság I	23	21	—		—		6 (Note: Four appearances and one goal in Nógrád Megyei Kupa, two appearances in Megyei Bajnokság I promotion play-offs)	1	29	22
Bánk-Dalnoki	2022–23	Nemzeti Bajnokság III	27	14	—		—		—		27	14
Bánk-Dalnoki	2023–24	Megyei Bajnokság I	28	34	1	1	—		3 (Note: Two appearances and two goals in Nógrád Vármegyei Kupa, one appearance in Megyei Bajnokság I promotion play-offs)	2	32	37
Bánk-Dalnoki	Total		78	69	1	1	—		9	3	88	73
Bánk-Dalnoki II	2022–23	Megyei Bajnokság I	0	0	—		—		—		0	0
Kistarcsa	2024–25	Megyei Bajnokság II	26	7	—		—		—		26	7
Kistarcsa	2025–26	Megyei Bajnokság III	11	11	—		—		1 (Note: Appearance in Pest Megyei Kupa)	0	12	11
Kistarcsa	Total		37	18	—		—		1	0	38	18
Cso-Ki Sport	2025–26	Megyei Bajnokság I	11	3	—		—		—		11	3
Career total			483	168	30	6	8	0	32	10	553	184

== Honours ==
Soroksár

- Nemzeti Bajnokság III – Alföld: 2012–13

Salgótarján

- Nógrád Szuperkupa: 2014

Komárom

- Megyei Bajnokság I – Komárom-Esztergom: 2017–18
- Komárom-Esztergom Megyei Kupa: 2018

Bánk-Dalnoki

- Megyei Bajnokság I – Nógrád: 2021–22
- Nógrád County Cup: 2022

Individual

- Megyei Bajnokság I – Nógrád top scorer: 2023–24
