= József Duró =

Hungarian footballer and manager (1966–2022)

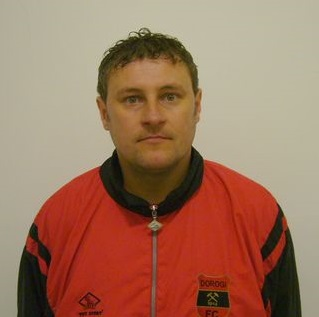
- Duró with Dorogi FC, 2010

Personal information
- Date of birth: 26 June 1966
- Place of birth: Berettyóújfalu, Hungary
- Date of death: May 2022 (aged 55)
- Position: Midfielder

Senior career*
Years	Team	Apps	(Gls)
1987–1988	Debreceni VSC	75	(1)
1988–1991	Vasas SC	73	(11)
1991–1992	BFC Siófok	30	(4)
1992–1996	Budapest Honvéd	66	(7)
1996–1997	Bnei Yehuda Tel Aviv	17	(0)
1997–1998	BVSC Budapest	9	(1)
1998–1999	Sri Pahang FC		
1999	Qatar SC		

International career
1990–1995	Hungary	21	(0)

Managerial career
- 2003: Budapest Honvéd
- 2009–2011: Dorogi FC
- 2011–2012: Vecsési FC
- * Club domestic league appearances and goals

József Duró (26 June 1966 – May 2022) was a Hungarian football manager and player.

== Playing career ==
Duró played abroad in Malaysia for Pahang FA before moving to Qatar SC in 1999.

== Honours ==
Kispest Honvéd

- Nemzeti Bajnokság I: 1992–93

== Death ==
On 22 May 2022, it was announced that he had died.
