= Márkó Sós =

Hungarian footballer

Personal information
- Full name: Márkó Sós
- Date of birth: 29 December 1990 (age 35)
- Place of birth: Budapest, Hungary
- Height: 1.85 m (6 ft 1 in)
- Position: Defender

Team information
- Current team: Gyirmót
- Number: 85

Youth career
- 2003–2006: Honvéd
- 2006–2007: Újpest
- 2007–2010: Honvéd

Senior career*
Years	Team	Apps	(Gls)
2009–2011	Honvéd	1	(0)
2011–2012	Rákospalota	26	(5)
2012–2013	Kecskemét	11	(2)
2013–2015	Gyirmót	19	(1)
Feb-Jul 2015	SZTK		
2015-2016	Csepel FC		
Feb-Jul 2016	Vecsés		
2016-2017	Dabas-Gyón		
2017-2018	Jászfényszaru		
Feb-Aug 2018	Hetényegyház		
2018-2020	Valkó		
Mar-Jul 2020	Balatonlelle		
2020-2021	Dunavarsány		
2021-2022	Vecsés		
Jan-Jul 2022	Örkény SE		
2022-2023	Aranyszarvas		
Feb-Jul 2023	Maglódi TC		
2023-2024	SZAC Budapest		
2024-2025	Altmünster		
- * Club domestic league appearances and goals

Márkó Sós (born 29 December 1990) is a retired Hungarian football player. He has retired in 1 Jan 2025.

He played a variety of position in his career, his main position is right back and also played in right midfield and defensive midfield.
