= Tamás Nagy (footballer, born 1987) =

Hungarian footballer

Personal information
- Full name: Tamás Nagy
- Date of birth: 30 July 1987 (age 39)
- Place of birth: Budapest, Hungary
- Height: 1.76 m (5 ft 9 in)
- Position: Midfielder

Team information
- Current team: Balassagyarmat

Youth career
- 2002–2005: Vác

Senior career*
Years	Team	Apps	(Gls)
2005–2006	Vác	16	(3)
2006–2008	Vasas	17	(2)
2007–2008	→ Pápa (loan)	11	(2)
2008–2009	Diósgyőr	5	(0)
2009	Kaposvölgye	10	(5)
2009–2010	Vác	21	(4)
2010–2011	Rákospalota	7	(0)
2011–2012	Sankt Andrä		
2012–2013	Siófok	13	(1)
2013–2014	Southern Stars		
2014–2015	Vasas	23	(5)
2015	→ Siófok (loan)	4	(0)
2015–2016	Budaörs	12	(0)
2016–2017	Budafok	35	(4)
2018	III. Kerület	13	(5)
2018–2019	Cegléd	15	(0)
2019–	Balassagyarmat	12	(5)
- * Club domestic league appearances and goals as of 22:28, 5 February 2020 (UTC)

Tamás Nagy (born 30 July 1987) is a Hungarian football (forward) player who currently plays for Balassagyarmati VSE.
