= Attila Kornis =

Hungarian footballer

Personal information
- Full name: Attila Kornis
- Date of birth: 17 May 1989 (age 37)
- Place of birth: Budapest, Hungary
- Height: 1.87 m (6 ft 1 1/2 in)
- Position: Defender

Youth career
- 2005–2007: MTK Budapest
- 2007–2008: Vasas

Senior career*
Years	Team	Apps	(Gls)
2007–2008	Vasas II	13	(4)
2008–2013	MTK Budapest	1	(0)
2008–2011	→ MTK Budapest II	76	(7)
2011–2012	→ Rákospalota (loan)	25	(0)
2013–2016	Szigetszentmiklós	42	(1)
2015–2016	→ Diósd (loan)	25	(3)
- * Club domestic league appearances and goals as of 7 February 2022

Attila Kornis (born 17 May 1989) is a Hungarian football player who currently plays for MTK Hungária FC.
