= Zsolt Nagy (footballer, born 1979) =

Hungarian footballer

Personal information
- Full name: Zsolt Nagy
- Date of birth: 23 March 1979 (age 47)
- Place of birth: Debrecen, Hungary
- Height: 1.83 m (6 ft 0 in)
- Position: Striker

Team information
- Current team: Szolnok

Senior career*
Years	Team	Apps	(Gls)
1995–1996	Debreceni VSC	4	(0)
1996–1999	Spartacus Hajdúszoboszlói		
1999	Doxa Katokopias	0	(0)
2000	Csepel SC	12	(1)
2000–2001	Marcali	18	(1)
2001–2003	Létavértes	13	(10)
2003	Oleksandriya	5	(0)
2003–2004	Nyva Vinnytsia	41	(9)
2005	Zakarpattia Uzhhorod	12	(2)
2005	Chornomorets Odesa	8	(1)
2006–2007	Vasas SC	10	(0)
2007–2008	Prykarpattya Ivano-Frankivsk	18	(1)
2008	Atromitos Yeroskipou	5	(0)
2009	ASIL Lysi		
2010	Szolnok	5	(0)
- * Club domestic league appearances and goals

Zsolt Nagy (born 23 March 1979) is a Hungarian football player who plays for Szolnoki MÁV FC.

He began playing football with Debreceni VSC in Hungary. After spells with Hajdúszoboszlói SE, Csepel SC, Marcali VFC and Létavértes SE, he moved to Ukraine. He would play for FC Zakarpattia Uzhhorod and FC Chornomorets Odesa before returning to Hungary to play for Vasas SC in December 2006.
