= Stadion Dózsa György út =

Sports stadium in Vecsés, Hungary

- Interactive map of Stadion Dózsa György út
- Location: Vecsés, Hungary Dózsa György út 37.
- Coordinates: 47°24′16″N 19°15′10″E
- Owner: Vecsési Városi Önkormányzat
- Capacity: 3,000
- Field size: 105 x 66 meters

Construction
- Opened: 1926

Tenant
- Vecsési FC

Stadion Dózsa György út is a sports stadium in Vecsés, Hungary. The stadium is home to the famous association football side Vecsési FC. The stadium has a capacity of 3,000.

== Attendance ==
=== Records ===
Record Attendance:

- 10,000 Vecsés v Ferencváros, November 15, 2008.
