= Zoltán Jovánczai =

Hungarian footballer (born 1984)

Personal information
- Full name: Zoltán Jovánczai
- Date of birth: 8 December 1984 (age 41)
- Place of birth: Kaposvár, Hungary
- Height: 1.83 m (6 ft 0 in)
- Position: Striker

Senior career*
Years	Team	Apps	(Gls)
2004–2005	Kaposvári Rákóczi FC	23	(3)
2005–2007	Ferencvárosi TC	35	(14)
2007–2008	Vasas SC	3	(0)
2008–2010	Kaposvári Rákóczi FC	24	(0)
2010–2011	Lombard-Pápa TFC	18	(2)
2011–2012	REAC	37	(8)
2012–2013	Szeged	23	(9)
2013–2015	BSC 1921	27	(15)
2015–	Kaposvári Rákóczi FC	12	(17)

International career
2002–2003	Hungary U19	10	(4)
2006	Hungary U-21	2	(1)
- * Club domestic league appearances and goals as of 1 December 2015

Zoltán Jovánczai (born 8 December 1984 in Kaposvár) is a Hungarian football player. He became the coach of Juta Sport Egyesület, in November 2024.
