= Mariusz Unierzyski =

Polish footballer

Personal information
- Full name: Mariusz Unierzyski
- Date of birth: 5 March 1974 (age 52)
- Place of birth: Płońsk, Poland
- Height: 1.89 m (6 ft 2 1/2 in)
- Position: Defender

Senior career*
Years	Team	Apps	(Gls)
1992–1993	Tęcza 34 Płońsk		
1993–1994	Gwardia Warsaw		
1994–1997	Tęcza 34 Płońsk		
1997–1999	Legionovia Legionowo		
1999	Polonia Warsaw	2	(0)
2000	Polonia Warsaw II		
2000–2001	Dolcan Ząbki		
2001–2002	KSZO Ostrowiec	25	(0)
2003	Świt Nowy Dwór Mazowiecki	10	(1)
2003–2004	RKS Radomsko	22	(2)
2004	Ruch Chorzów	13	(0)
2005	Drwęca Nowe Miasto Lubawskie	16	(1)
2006	Ilisiakos	2	(0)
2006–2009	Vasas	77	(2)
2009–2011	Dolcan Ząbki	48	(1)
2009–2011	Tęcza 34 Płońsk		
2009–2011	Błękitni Raciąż		
2015–2022	Świt Staroźreby		

Managerial career
- 2015–2022: Świt Staroźreby (player-manager)
- * Club domestic league appearances and goals

Mariusz Unierzyski (born 5 March 1974) is a Polish football manager and former player who played as a defender.

== Career ==
In the summer of 2009, he moved to Dolcan Ząbki from Vasas. He was released from Dolcan on 27 June 2011.

== Honours ==
Polonia Warsaw

- Ekstraklasa: 1999–2000
- Polish League Cup: 1999–2000
