= Zsolt Szabó (footballer) =

Hungarian footballer

Personal information
- Full name: Zsolt Szabó
- Date of birth: 30 April 1986 (age 40)
- Place of birth: Győr, Hungary
- Height: 1.75 m (5 ft 9 in)
- Position: Striker

Team information
- Current team: Sopron
- Number: 10

Youth career
- 2003–2005: Győr

Senior career*
Years	Team	Apps	(Gls)
2005–2008	Győr	31	(4)
2007–2008	→ Gyirmót (loan)	27	(15)
2008–2011	Pápa	41	(6)
2010	→ Rákospalota (loan)	10	(6)
2011–2012	Rákospalota	19	(8)
2012–2013	Veszprém	28	(14)
2013–	Sopron	6	(0)
- * Club domestic league appearances and goals as of 20 October 2013

Zsolt Szabó (born 30 April 1986 in Győr) is a Hungarian football player who currently plays for Soproni VSE.
