= Péter Kincses =

Hungarian footballer

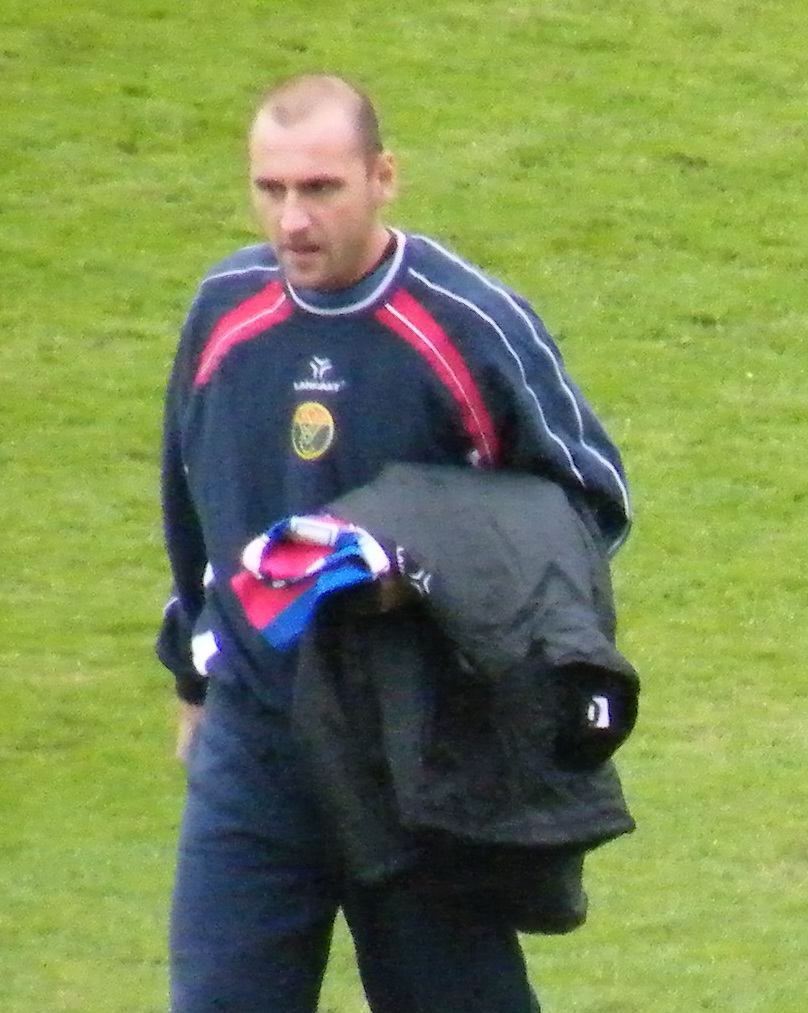

Personal information
- Date of birth: 23 May 1980 (age 46)
- Place of birth: Budapest, Hungary
- Height: 1.78 m (5 ft 10 in)
- Position: Midfielder

Youth career
- MTK

Senior career*
Years	Team	Apps	(Gls)
1997–2001	MTK	27	(2)
1999	→ Kecskemét (loan)	18	(3)
2000	→ BKV Előre SC (loan)	11	(5)
2001–2002	Tatabánya	30	(7)
2002–2004	Haladás	45	(10)
2004–2006	Lombard-Pápa	50	(3)
2006–2008	Vasas	57	(9)
2008–2009	Újpest	3	(0)
2009–2010	Vasas	11	(0)
2010	Szigetszentmiklós	10	(2)
2011	Honvéd II	11	(0)
2011	SV Ratzersdorf		
2012	Rákosmente		
2012–2015	Soroksár	34	(3)

International career
1996–1997	Hungary U-17	12	(4)
1998–1999	Hungary U-18	5	(0)
1999–2000	Hungary U-21	2	(0)
- * Club domestic league appearances and goals

Péter Kincses (born 23 May 1980) is a Hungarian former footballer who played as a midfielder.

== Club career ==
Kincses joined Vasas SC from Újpest FC in July 2009.
