= Roland Mundi =

Hungarian footballer

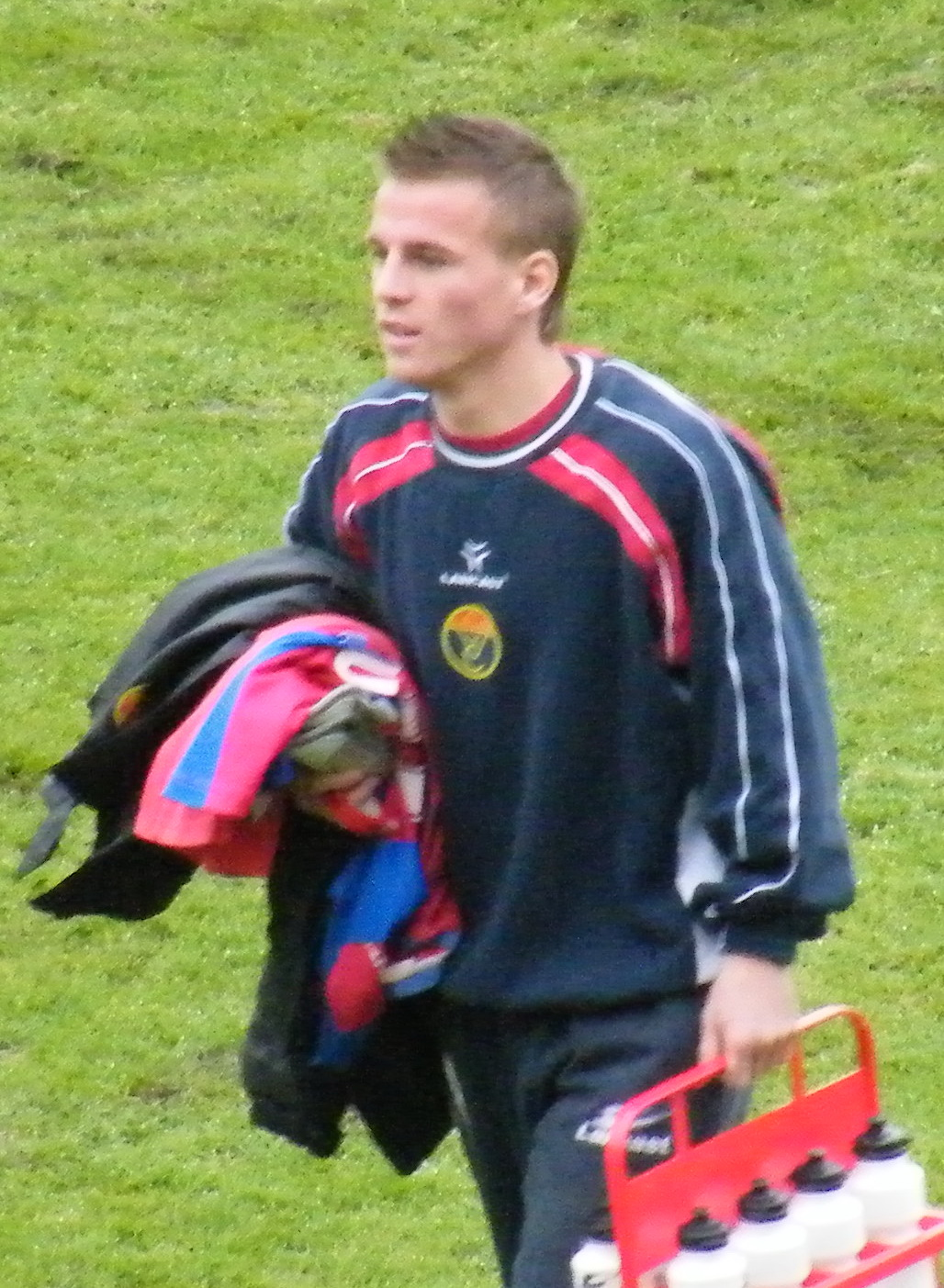

Personal information
- Full name: Roland Mundi
- Date of birth: 9 June 1988 (age 38)
- Place of birth: Vác, Hungary
- Height: 1.70 m (5 ft 7 in)
- Position: Midfielder

Team information
- Current team: Mosonmagyaróvár

Youth career
- 2003–2006: Vasas

Senior career*
Years	Team	Apps	(Gls)
2006–2013	Vasas	47	(1)
2008	→ Soroksár (loan)	15	(1)
2011–2012	→ Szolnok (loan)	30	(8)
2013–2015	Szolnok	34	(2)
2015–2017	Mosonmagyaróvár		
2017–2018	Dabas		
2018–2019	Dunaújváros PASE		
2019–	Mosonmagyaróvár		
- * Club domestic league appearances and goals as of 01:40, 9 November 2019 (UTC)

Roland Mundi (born 9 August 1988, in Vác) is a professional Hungarian footballer currently plays for Mosonmagyaróvári TE.
