= Vecsési FC =

Hungarian football club

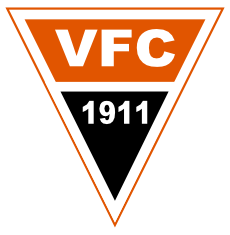
- Logo of Vecsési FC
- Full name: Vecsési Futball Club
- Nickname: –
- Founded: 1911
- Ground: Stadion Dózsa György út Vecsés, Hungary
- Capacity: 3,000
- Chairman: Tibor Földvári
- Manager: József Duró
- League: MB I Pest
- 2022–23: MB I Pest, 1st of 16
- Website: https://www.vecsesfc.hu/
Home colours	Away colours

Vecsési FC is a Hungarian football club located in Vecsés, Hungary. It currently plays in Megyei Bajnokság I – Pest. The team's colors are red and white.

== History ==
Vecsési FC was established in 1911.

On 19 January 2009, Lajos Détári was appointed as the coach of the club.

In 2011, the club celebrated their 100-year-old establishment.

On 1 September 2011, József Dúró was appointed as the manager of the club, replacing Lajos Détári.

== Honours and achievements ==
=== League ===
- Nemzeti Bajnokság III (level 3)
  - Runners-up (1): 2004–05

=== County Leagues (Pest) ===
- Megyei Bajnokság I (level 4)
  - Winners (3): 2016–17, 2020–21, 2022–23
  - Runners-up (2): 2014–15, 2015–16
- Megyei Bajnokság II (level 5)
  - Winners (2): 1996–97, 2000–01
  - Runners-up (1): 1999–2000

== Seasons ==
The table below shows the seasons of Vecsési FC.

Season	Tier	Club's name	Position	Pts
1912–13	2	Vecsési SE	4 / 6	
1913–14	2	Vecsési SE	3 / 7	13
1916–17	3	Vecsési SE	0 / 14	-
1917–18	2	Vecsési SE	9 / 10	
1918–19	2	Vecsési IMTK	0 / 4	
1919–20	2	Vecsési MTK	1 / 4	5
1919–20	2	Vecsési MTK	5 / 7	
1920–21	2	Vecsési MTK	4 / 7	
1921–22	2	Vecsési MTK	0 / 9	
1922–23	2	Vecsési MTK	7 / 10	11
1923–24	2	Vecsési MTK	6 / 8	8
1924–25	3	Vecsési MTK	1 / 7	12
1925–26	2	Vecsési TK	5 / 10	19
1926–27	2	Vecsési TK	8 / 9	8
1927–28	3	Vecsési SC	1 / 9	18
1928–29	2	Vecsési SC	11 / 12	14
1929–30	2	Vecsési SC	6 / 8	12
1930–31	2	Vecsési SC	5 / 8	6
1931–32	2	Vecsési SC	10 / 10	
1932–33	3	Vecsési SC	3 / 13	
1933–34	3	Vecsési SC	1 / 12	
1934–35	3	Vecsési SC	1 / 12	35
1935–36	3	Vecsési SC	6 / 11	15
1936–37	3	Vecsési SC	4 / 10	24
1937–38	3	Vecsési SC	1 / 11	33
1938–39	3	Vecsési SC	3 / 12	31
1939–40	3	Vecsési SC	5 / 12	24
1940–41	4	Vecsési SC	11 / 14	21
1941–42	4	Vecsési MOVE	12 / 13	12
1943–44	4	MOVE Vecsési SC	6 / 14	27
1945	2	Vecsési MTK	0 / 8	
1945–46	2	Vecsési MTK	6 / 12	15
1946–47	4	Vecsési MTK	0 / 14	
1947–48	4	Vecsési MTK	0 / 14	
1948–49	3	Vecsési MTK	10 / 16	28
1949–50	3	Vecsési SzMTK	10 / 16	28
1950	3	Vecsési SzMTK	8 / 16	16
1951	3	Vecsési Lokomotív	1 / 14	37
1952	3	Vecsési Lokomotív	5 / 14	31
1953	3	Vecsési Lokomotív	12 / 16	25
1954	3	Vecsési Lokomotív	10 / 16	26
1957	4	Vecsés	1 / 10	28
1957–58	4	Vecsési MTK	10 / 16	31
1958–59	4	Vecsési MTK	6 / 16	32
1959–60	4	Vecsési MTK	6 / 16	32
1960–61	4	Vecsési MTK	2 / 18	45
1961–62	4	Vecsési MTK	7 / 17	33
1962–63	4	Vecsés	3 / 16	36
1963	5	Vecsési MTK Spartacus	10 / 16	14
1964	5	Vecsés	11 / 16	26
1965	6	Vecsés	1 / 14	43
1966	5	Vecsési VÍZÉP	10 / 16	30
1967	5	Vecsés	1 / 16	47
1968	4	Vecsési Vizép SK	3 / 16	39
1969	4	Vecsési Vizép	1 / 16	45
1970	3	Vecsési Vizép SK	14 / 16	11
1970–71	3	Vecsési Vizép	14 / 16	24
1971–72	4	Vecsési SE	9 / 16	30
1972–73	4	Vecsési SE	16 / 16	15
1973–74	5	Vecsési SE	11 / 16	28
1974–75	5	Vecsés	3 / 13	34
1975–76	5	Vecsés	4 / 12	24
1976–77	5	Vecsés	1 / 11	34
1977–78	5	Vecsés	2 / 9	32
1978–79	4	Vecsés	3 / 14	37
1979–80	4	Vecsés	2 / 16	45
1980–81	4	Vecsés	1 / 16	49
1981–82	5	Vecsés	1 / 14	43
1982–83	4	Ferihegy SE (Vecsés)	9 / 16	26
1983–84	4	Ferihegy SE	14 / 16	15
1984–85	4	Vecsés	16 / 16	3
1985–86	5	Vecsés	14 / 14	6
1986–87	6	Vecsés	7 / 16	30
1987–88	6	Vecsés	2 / 16	46
1988–89	6	Vecsés	6 / 15	47
1989–90	6	Vecsés	1 / 14	48
1990–91	5	Vecsés	12 / 16	25
1991–92	5	Vecsés	16 / 16	15
1992–93	6	Vecsés	1 / 14	45
1993–94	5	Vecsés	14 / 16	12
1994–95	6	Vecsés	4 / 16	59
1996–97	5	Vecsés	1 / 16	64
1997–98	5	Vecsés	17 / 18	26
1998–99	6	Vecsés	4 / 16	55
1999–00	5	Vecsés	2 / 18	78
2000–01	5	Vecsés	1 / 18	86
2001–02	4	Vecsési FC	9 / 14	37
2002–03	4	Vecsési FC	4 / 16	58
2003–04	3	Vecsési FC	14 / 16	27
2004–05	3	Vecsési FC	2 / 16	68
2005–06	2	Vecsési FC	12 / 16	28
2006–07	2	Vecsési FC	7 / 16	42
2007–08	2	Vecsési FC	5 / 16	46
2008–09	2	Vecsési FC	11 / 16	36
2009–10	2	Vecsési FC	6 / 15	41
2010–11	2	Vecsési FC	7 / 16	38
2011–12	2	Vecsési FC	16 / 16	17
2012–13	3	Vecsési FC	8 / 14	32
2013–14	4	Vecsés FC	3 / 16	58
2014–15	4	Vecsési FC	2 / 16	63
2015–16	4	Vecsési FC	2 / 16	64
2016–17	4	Vecsési FC	1 / 16	70
2017–18	3	Vecsési FC	16 / 16	16
2018–19	4	Vecsési FC	6 / 16	48
2019–20	4	Vecsési FC	6 / 16	28
2020–21	4	Vecsési FC	1 / 16	69
2021–22	4	Vecsési FC	3 / 16	57
2022–23	4	Vecsési FC	1 / 16	69
2023–24	4	Vecsési FC	4 / 16	48
2024–25	4	Vecsési FC	8 / 16	45
2025–26	4	Vecsési FC-TriplexTargo	1 / 16	81
