= Vecsés =

Vecsés Wetschesch
- Town
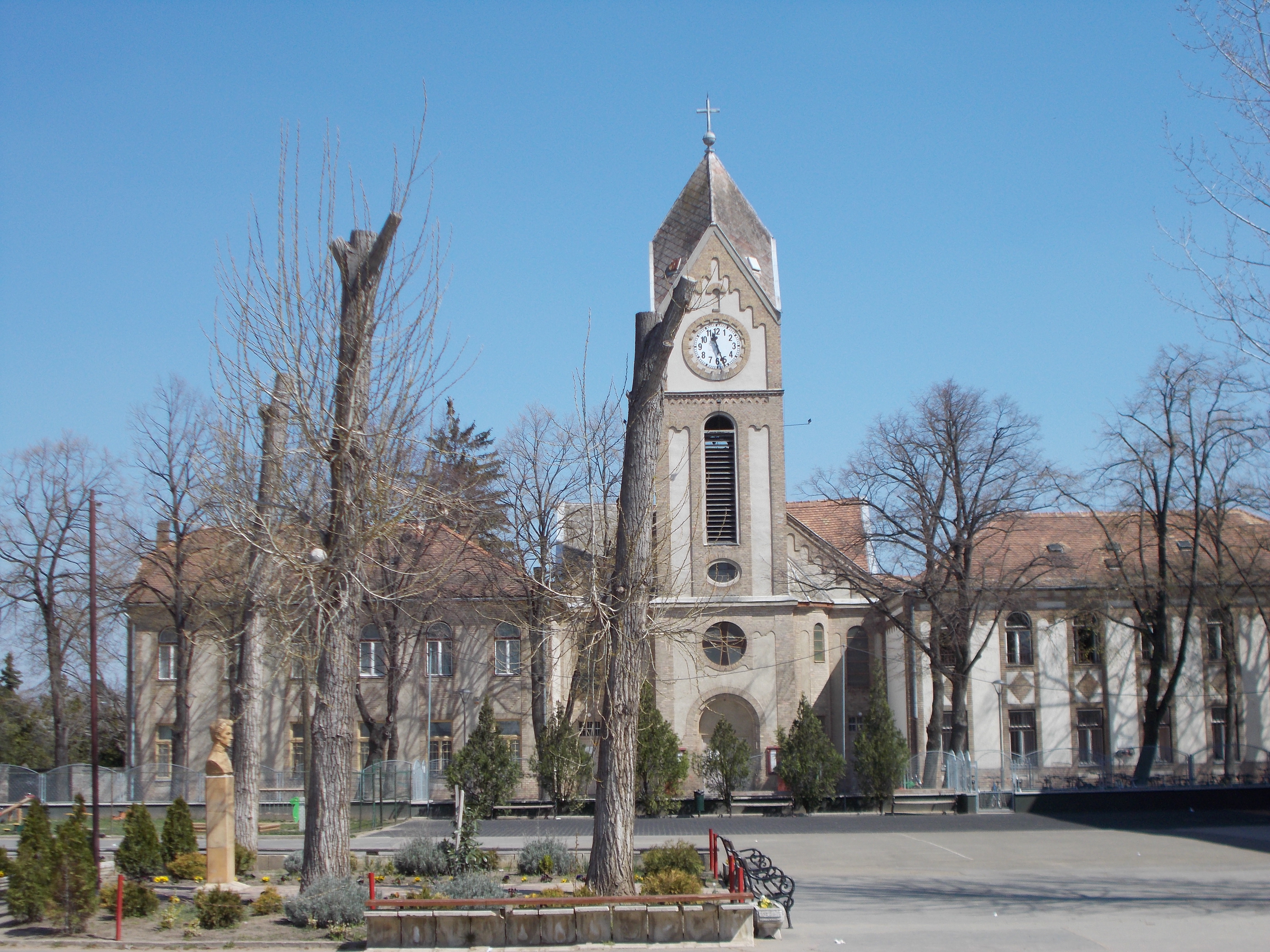
- The church

- Flag Coat of arms

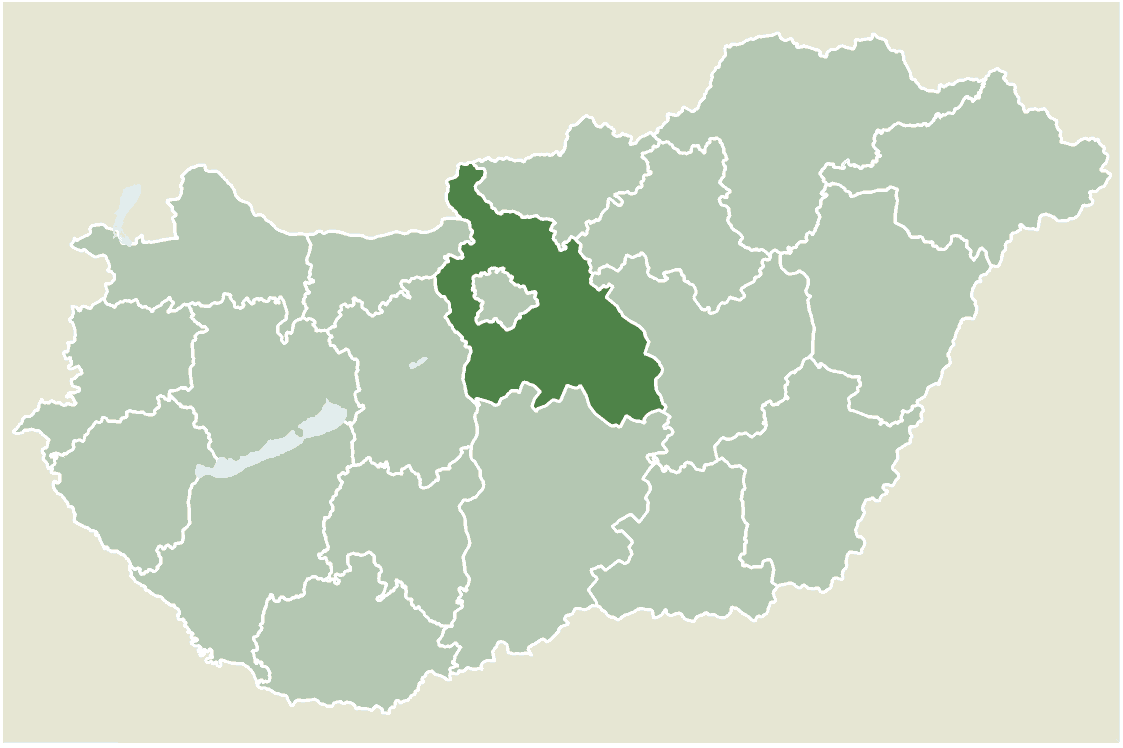
- Location of Pest county in Hungary

- Location of Vecsés
- Coordinates: 47.4057°N 19.2648°E
- Country: Hungary
- County: Pest

Area
  - Total: 36.18 km^{2} (13.97 sq mi)

Population (2009)
  - Total: 20,550
  - Density: 518.79/km^{2} (1,343.7/sq mi)
- Time zone: UTC+1 (CET)
  - Summer (DST): UTC+2 (CEST)
- Postal code: 2220
- Area code: 29

Vecsés (pronounced [ˈvɛt͡ʃeːʃ]; German: Wetschesch) is a town of 20,550 inhabitants in Budapest metropolitan area, Pest County, Hungary, situated adjacent to Budapest Ferenc Liszt International Airport.

== History ==
The village was first mentioned in records in 1318. In the 14th and 15th centuries, the region had a dense network of villages and extant documents mention it as an ecclesiastical place. In 1786 Count Antal Grassalkovich settled 50 families in Vecsés, who were mainly Swabian, and to a lesser extent Slovak and Hungarian inhabitants from the surrounding villages.

The Swabian farmers grew cabbage and brought their Germanic tradition of sauerkraut production with them and Vecsés is famous even today for its sauerkraut. Vecsés started to develop quickly after it was formed. From the end of the 19th century, the population started to grow, the village had a busy social, cultural and political life. It had a high number of victims in World War II. By the late 20th century, Vecsés became a town of individual character and as such was elevated from village to town on 2 July 2001.

The 1943 novel Indul a bakterház by Rideg Sándor was set near the town, and the 1980 film film adaptation of the novel was shot on location.

== Economy ==
At one time the airline Wizz Air had its head office in the Airport Business Park C2 in Vecsés. The airline moved into its current head office on the property of Budapest Liszt Ferenc International Airport in the northern hemisphere summer of 2011.

== Transport ==
Bus-lines

The autobus company "VOLÁNBUSZ" operates 3 buses to Vecsés town:

1. Vecsés, Erzsébet tér > Budapest, Kőbánya-Kispest vá.
2. Vecsés, Sportpályam > Budapest, Csévéző utca
3. Vecsés, Anna utca > Budapest, Népliget and Budapest Transport serves one line to Vecsés
4. Route 200E (Budapest, Kőbánya-Kispest railway and subway station > Budapest, Liszt Ferenc Airport Terminal 2)

== Twin towns – sister cities ==
Vecsés is twinned with:

- Lăzarea, Romania
- Rheinstetten, Germany

== Gallery ==
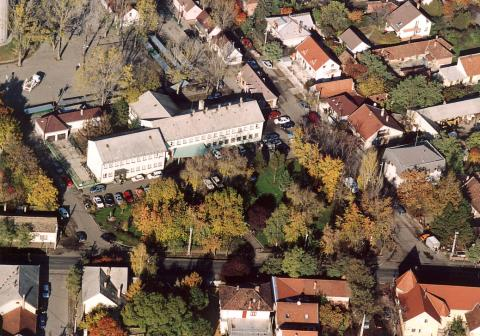

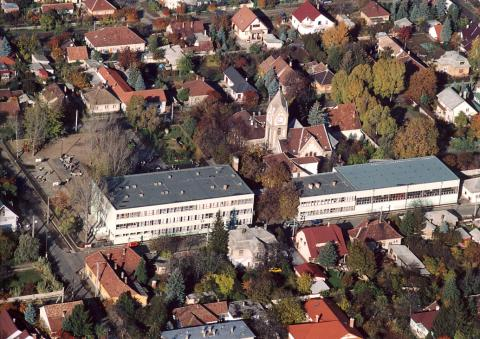

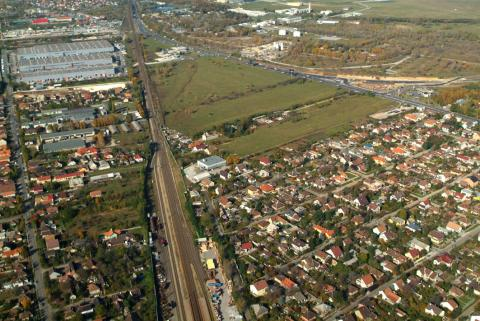

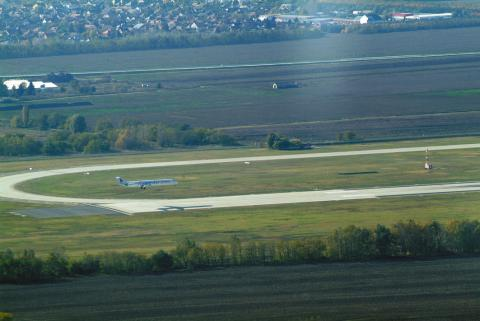

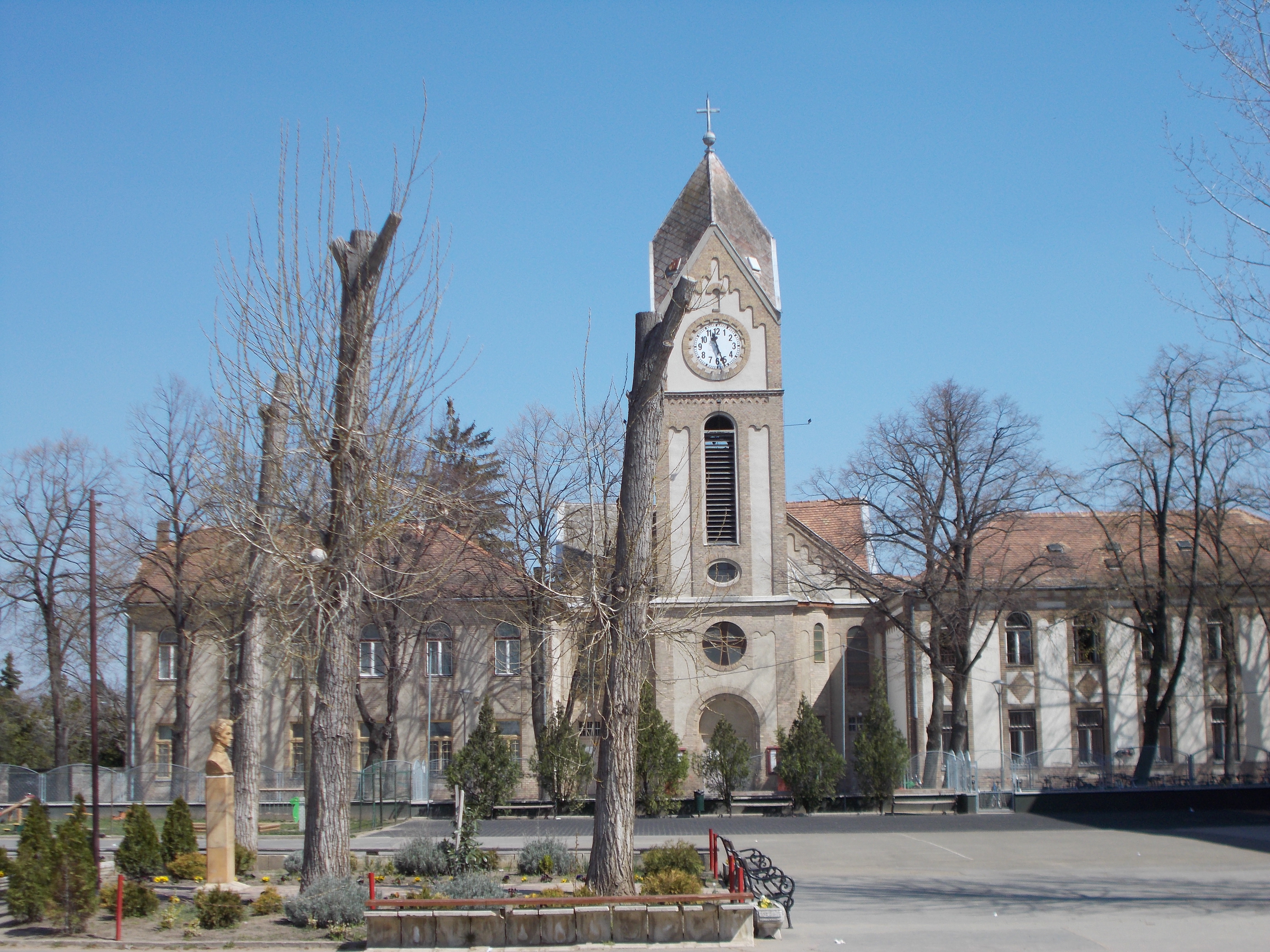
