= 2014–15 Pécsi MFC season =

Pécs
2014–15 season
- Chairman: Dezső Matyi
- Manager: Robert Jarni
- Stadium: Stadion PMFC
- Nemzeti Bajnokság I: 11th (relegated)
- Hungarian Cup: Round of 16
- Hungarian League Cup: Round of 16
Home colours	Away colours

The 2014–15 season was Pécsi Mecsek Football Club's 50th competitive season, 4th consecutive season in the OTP Bank Liga, where it finished 11th and 64th year in existence as a football club. Among the championship, the team competed in the Hungarian Cup and the Ligakupa. Both competitions saw Pécs MFC eliminated in the round of 16.

== Background ==
Despite finishing seventh in the previous season, reaching their best result in the last ten years, coaching duo Gábor Márton and Emil Lőrincz were sacked, and György Véber was appointed as new manager in early June. Former player of the club, Árpád Kulcsár was announced as assistant coach, whereas Zoltán Bogyay Jr. will be in charge as goalkeeper coach.

The club's top scorer of the last season, Krisztián Koller left the team and joined Nyíregyháza Spartacus FC together with Ferenc Fodor, however the rest of the squad will continue in Pécs for the season.

== Squad ==
=== Current squad ===
As of 19 October 2014.

Note: Flags indicate national team as defined under FIFA eligibility rules; some limited exceptions apply. Players may hold more than one non-FIFA nationality.

No.	Pos.	Nation	Player
1	GK	HUN	Gergő Gőcze
44	GK	HUN	Vukasin Poleksic
4	DF	HUN	József Nagy
5	DF	CAN	James Manjrekar
6	DF	HUN	Béla Balogh
7	MF	HUN	Dávid Wittrédi
8	MF	HUN	Dávid Márkvárt
9	MF	HUN	Norbert Heffler
10	FW	HUN	Roland Frőhlich
11	FW	HUN	Patrik Gránicz
14	DF	CRO	Andrej Čaušić
17	MF	HUN	Adrián Horváth

No.	Pos.	Nation	Player
18	DF	HUN	Levente Lantos
21	DF	CRO	Danijel Romić
22	DF	HUN	Dávid Mohl
25	FW	HUN	Ferenc Rácz (loan from MTK)
27	MF	HUN	Róbert Kővári
29	FW	HUN	Richárd Frank
32	MF	HUN	Lóránd Szatmári
33	MF	NGA	Eke Uzoma
44	GK	MNE	Vukašin Poleksić
60	FW	HUN	Péter Pölöskei

== Transfers ==
=== Summer ===
In: Note: Flags indicate national team as defined under FIFA eligibility rules; some limited exceptions apply. Players may hold more than one non-FIFA nationality.

No.	Pos.	Nation	Player
—	MF	HUN	Norbert Heffler (from Paks)
—	MF	NGA	Eke Uzoma (from (Germany) Sandhausen)
—	FW	HUN	Péter Pölöskei (from Debrecen)
—	DF	CRO	Andrej Čaušić (from (Slovakia) Dunajská Streda)
—	FW	HUN	Ferenc Rácz (loan from MTK)
—	GK	HUN	Donát Helesfay (loan from Kozármisleny)
—	GK	HUN	Péter Molnár (loan return from Kozármisleny)
—	GK	HUN	Ádám Holczer (loan return from Kozármisleny)

Out:

Note: Flags indicate national team as defined under FIFA eligibility rules; some limited exceptions apply. Players may hold more than one non-FIFA nationality.

No.	Pos.	Nation	Player
5	DF	HUN	Ferenc Fodor (to Nyíregyháza)
9	FW	HUN	Krisztián Koller (to Nyíregyháza)
11	MF	HUN	Miroszláv Zsdrál (to Kaposvár)
13	FW	SRB	Milan Perić (loan return to Videoton)
15	GK	HUN	Donát Helesfay (loan return to Kozármisleny)
20	MF	HUN	Viktor Városi (to Haladás)
25	FW	HUN	Ferenc Rácz (loan return to MTK Budapest)
31	GK	HUN	Bence Steer
31	GK	HUN	Ádám Holczer (to Soroksár)
37	MF	HUN	Dávid Bailo (to Zalaegerszeg)
60	FW	HUN	Péter Pölöskei (loan return to Debrecen)

=== Winter ===
In: Note: Flags indicate national team as defined under FIFA eligibility rules; some limited exceptions apply. Players may hold more than one non-FIFA nationality.

No.	Pos.	Nation	Player
—	DF	CRO	Mario Tadejevic (from free agent)
—	MF	CRO	Ivo Weitzer (from (Croatia) NK Zadar)
—	FW	BUL	Dimitar Makriev (from free agent)

Out:

Note: Flags indicate national team as defined under FIFA eligibility rules; some limited exceptions apply. Players may hold more than one non-FIFA nationality.

No.	Pos.	Nation	Player
—	FW	HUN	Péter Pölöskey (to unknown)
—	DF	HUN	Dávid Mohl (to unknown)
—	MF	HUN	Dávid Wittrédi (to DVSC)
—	DF	HUN	Levente Lantos (to Kozármisleny)

== Statistics ==
=== Appearances and goals ===
Last updated on 26 October 2014.

No.	Pos	Nat	Player	Total		OTP Bank Liga		Hungarian Cup		League Cup	
No.	Pos	Nat	Player	Apps	Goals	Apps	Goals	Apps	Goals	Apps	Goals
1	GK	(Hungary) HUN	Gergő Gőcze	12	-18	7	-13	1	-1	4	-4
4	DF	(Hungary) HUN	József Nagy	18	0	12	0	2	0	4	0
5	DF	(Canada) CAN	James Manjrekar	4	0	1	0	2	0	1	0
6	DF	(Hungary) HUN	Béla Balogh	12	0	12	0	0	0	0	0
7	MF	(Hungary) HUN	Dávid Wittrédi	13	1	6	1	3	0	4	0
8	MF	(Hungary) HUN	Dávid Márkvárt	16	4	12	2	2	1	2	1
9	MF	(Hungary) HUN	Norbert Heffler	17	2	12	1	2	1	3	0
10	FW	(Hungary) HUN	Roland Frőhlich	18	2	11	0	3	2	4	0
11	FW	(Hungary) HUN	Patrik Gránicz	4	0	2	0	1	0	1	0
14	DF	(Croatia) CRO	Andrej Čaušić	10	0	5	0	3	0	2	0
17	MF	(Hungary) HUN	Adrián Horváth	18	0	12	0	2	0	4	0
18	DF	(Hungary) HUN	Levente Lantos	6	1	1	0	1	1	4	0
21	DF	(Croatia) CRO	Danijel Romić	17	1	11	0	2	0	4	1
22	DF	(Hungary) HUN	Dávid Mohl	13	3	10	2	2	1	1	0
25	FW	(Hungary) HUN	Ferenc Rácz	10	2	5	0	2	0	3	2
27	MF	(Hungary) HUN	Róbert Kővári	15	4	11	2	3	2	1	0
29	FW	(Hungary) HUN	Richárd Frank	4	1	2	0	0	0	2	1
32	MF	(Hungary) HUN	Lóránd Szatmári	19	1	12	1	3	0	4	0
33	MF	(Nigeria) NGA	Eke Uzoma	13	0	8	0	3	0	2	0
44	GK	(Montenegro) MNE	Vukašin Poleksić	7	-7	6	-7	1	0	0	0
60	FW	(Hungary) HUN	Péter Pölöskei	16	3	9	2	3	1	4	0
Youth players:
2	MF	(Hungary) HUN	Péter Beke	3	0	0	0	0	0	3	0
12	GK	(Hungary) HUN	Donát Helesfay	1	0	0	0	1	0	0	0
15	MF	(Montenegro) MNE	Miloš Pejaković	1	0	0	0	0	0	1	0
Players no longer at the club:

=== Top scorers ===
Includes all competitive matches. The list is sorted by shirt number when total goals are equal.

Last updated on 26 October 2014

Position	Nation	Number	Name	OTP Bank Liga	Hungarian Cup	League Cup	Total
1	(Hungary)	27	Róbert Kővári	2	2	0	4
2	(Hungary)	8	Dávid Márkvárt	2	1	1	4
3	(Hungary)	7	Dávid Wittrédi	1	3	0	4
4	(Hungary)	22	Dávid Mohl	2	1	0	3
5	(Hungary)	60	Péter Pölöskei	2	1	0	3
6	(Hungary)	9	Norbert Heffler	1	1	0	2
7	(Hungary)	10	Roland Frőhlich	0	2	0	2
8	(Hungary)	25	Ferenc Rácz	0	0	2	2
9	(Hungary)	32	Lóránd Szatmári	1	0	0	1
10	(Hungary)	18	Levente Lantos	0	1	0	1
11	(Croatia)	21	Danijel Romić	0	0	1	1
12	(Hungary)	29	Richárd Frank	0	0	1	1
/	/	/	Own Goals	1	0	0	1
			TOTALS	12	12	5	29

=== Disciplinary record ===
Includes all competitive matches. Players with 1 card or more included only.

Last updated on 26 October 2014

Position	Nation	Number	Name	OTP Bank Liga		Hungarian Cup		League Cup		Total (Hu Total)	
Position	Nation	Number	Name	Booked	Sent off (straight red)	Booked	Sent off (straight red)	Booked	Sent off (straight red)	Booked	Sent off (straight red)
GK	(Hungary)	1	Gergő Gőcze	1	0	0	0	0	0	1 (1)	0 (0)
DF	(Hungary)	4	József Nagy	2	0	1	0	0	0	3 (2)	0 (0)
DF	(Hungary)	6	Béla Balogh	3	0	0	0	0	0	3 (3)	0 (0)
MF	(Hungary)	7	Dávid Wittrédi	0	0	0	0	1	0	1 (0)	0 (0)
MF	(Hungary)	8	Dávid Márkvárt	3	0	0	0	1	0	4 (3)	0 (0)
MF	(Hungary)	9	Norbert Heffler	1	0	0	0	1	0	2 (1)	0 (0)
FW	(Hungary)	10	Roland Frőhlich	1	0	0	0	0	0	1 (1)	0 (0)
DF	(Croatia)	14	Andrej Čaušić	1	0	0	0	0	0	1 (1)	0 (0)
MF	(Hungary)	17	Adrián Horváth	3	0	0	0	0	0	3 (3)	0 (0)
DF	(Croatia)	21	Danijel Romić	2	1	0	0	2	0	4 (2)	1 (1)
DF	(Hungary)	22	Dávid Mohl	4	0	0	0	0	0	4 (4)	0 (0)
FW	(Hungary)	25	Ferenc Rácz	1	0	0	0	0	0	1 (1)	0 (0)
MF	(Hungary)	27	Róbert Kővári	1	0	0	0	0	0	1 (1)	0 (0)
MF	(Hungary)	32	Lóránd Szatmári	1	0	0	0	1	0	2 (1)	0 (0)
GK	(Montenegro)	44	Vukašin Poleksić	1	0	0	0	0	0	1 (1)	0 (0)
FW	(Hungary)	60	Péter Pölöskei	2	1	2	0	0	0	4 (2)	1 (1)
			TOTALS	27	2	3	0	6	0	36 (27)	2 (2)

=== Overall ===
Games played	19 (12 OTP Bank Liga, 3 Hungarian Cup and 4 Hungarian League Cup)
Games won	7 (2 OTP Bank Liga, 3 Hungarian Cup and 2 Hungarian League Cup)
Games drawn	5 (4 OTP Bank Liga, 0 Hungarian Cup and 1 Hungarian League Cup)
Games lost	7 (6 OTP Bank Liga, 0 Hungarian Cup and 1 Hungarian League Cup)
Goals scored	29
Goals conceded	25
Goal difference	+4
Yellow cards	36
Red cards	2
Worst discipline	(Hungary) Péter Pölöskei (4 (yellow card) , 1 (red card) )
Worst discipline	(Croatia) Danijel Romić (4 (yellow card) , 1 (red card) )
Best result	5–0 (A) v Kozármisleny - Magyar Kupa - 23-09-2014
Worst result	0–4 (H) v MTK - OTP Bank Liga - 26-07-2014
Most appearances	(Hungary) Lóránd Szatmári (19 appearances)
Top scorer	(Hungary) Dávid Wittrédi (4 goals)
Top scorer	(Hungary) Róbert Kővári (4 goals)
Top scorer	(Hungary) Dávid Márkvárt (4 goals)
Points	29/57 (50.88%)

Last updated: 26 October 2014

== Nemzeti Bajnokság I ==
=== Matches ===
26 July 2014 1	Pécs	0 – 4	MTK	Pécs, Baranya County
18:30 CEST		Report	Horváth 59'; Kanta 76', 90+2'; Frank 89'	Stadium: Stadion PMFC; Attendance: 1,320; Referee: (Hungary) Ádám Németh

1 August 2014 2	Puskás	2 – 2	Pécs	Felcsút, Fejér County
19:00 CEST	Lencse 6' (pen.); Čaušić 88' (o.g.)	Report	Márkvárt 37'; Kővári 62'	Stadium: Pancho Arena; Attendance: 1,077; Referee: (Hungary) Péter Solymosi

9 August 2014 3	Pécs	1 – 1	Újpest	Pécs, Baranya County
18:30 CEST	Mohl 44' (pen.)	Report	Simon 55'	Stadium: Stadion PMFC; Attendance: 1,852; Referee: (Hungary) József Erdős

17 August 2014 4	Haladás	1 – 1	Pécs	Szombathely, Vas County
18:30 CEST	Halmosi 64'	Report	Heffler 75'	Stadium: Rohonci Street Stadium; Attendance: 2,450; Referee: (Hungary) István Vad

24 August 2014 5	Pécs	1 – 2	Diósgyőr	Pécs, Baranya County
18:30 CEST	Wittrédi 90+4' (pen.)	Report	Gosztonyi 14', 21'	Stadium: Stadion PMFC; Attendance: 1,223; Referee: (Hungary) Zsolt Szabó

30 August 2014 6	Pécs	1 – 2	Kecskemét	Pécs, Baranya County
18:30 CEST	Pölöskei 86'	Report	Bebeto 14'; Balázs 48'	Stadium: Stadion PMFC; Attendance: 1,050; Referee: (Hungary) Mihály Fábián

13 September 2014 7	Debrecen	0 – 2	Pécs	Debrecen, Hajdú-Bihar County
14:30 CEST		Report	Mohl 55' (pen.); Pölöskei 90+2'	Stadium: Nagyerdei Stadion; Attendance: 2,546; Referee: (Hungary) József Erdős

19 September 2014 8	Pécs	1 – 1	Paks	Pécs, Baranya County
19:00 CEST	Kovács 90+2' (o.g.)	Report	Bartha 86'	Stadium: Stadion PMFC; Attendance: 822; Referee: (Hungary) Péter Solymosi

26 September 2014 9	Honvéd	1 – 2	Pécs	Budapest, Pest County
19:00 CEST	Youla 66' (pen.)	Report	Kővári 49'; Szatmári 63'	Stadium: Bozsik Stadion; Attendance: 987; Referee: (Hungary) József Erdős

4 October 2014 10	Pécs	0 – 2	Videoton	Pécs, Baranya County
18:00 CEST		Report	Nikolić 37'; Čaušić 46' (o.g.)	Stadium: Stadion PMFC; Attendance: 800; Referee: (Hungary) István Vad

18 October 2014 11	Ferencváros	2 – 0	Pécs	Budapest, Pest County
20:00 CEST	Nagy 11'; Busai 82'	Report		Stadium: Groupama Arena; Attendance: 6,023; Referee: (Hungary) Viktor Kassai

25 October 2014 12	Pécs	1 – 2	Pápa	Pécs, Baranya County
18:00 CEST	Márkvárt 35'	Report	Žuļevs 47'; Coroian 90'	Stadium: Stadion PMFC; Attendance: 400; Referee: (Hungary) Zoltán Iványi

=== Classification ===
Pos	Team	Pld	W	D	L	GF	GA	GD	Pts	Qualification or relegation
9	Kecskemét (R)	30	10	8	12	30	39	−9	38	Dissolved - Kecskeméti LC KTE SI in the Bács-Kiskun County Football League One as successor (Note: Kecskemét, Nyíregyháza and Pécs won't be members of 2015–16 Nemzeti Bajnokság I due to licence problems)
10	Puskás Akadémia	30	10	5	15	35	40	−5	35	
11	Pécs (R)	30	8	7	15	32	51	−19	31	Relegation to Baranya County Football League One
12	Nyíregyháza (R)	30	8	6	16	33	49	−16	30	Relegation to Nemzeti Bajnokság III
13	Honvéd	30	6	10	14	26	36	−10	28	

Source: mlsz.hu (in Hungarian)
Rules for classification: 1st points; 2nd overall wins; 3rd goal difference; 4th head-to-head points; 5th head-to-head goal difference; 6th head-to-head away goals scored; 7th fair-play points; 8th drawing of lots
(R) Relegated

=== Results summary ===
Overall								Home						Away					
Pld	W	D	L	GF	GA	GD	Pts	W	D	L	GF	GA	GD	W	D	L	GF	GA	GD
12	2	4	6	12	20	−8	10	0	2	5	5	14	−9	2	2	1	7	6	+1

Last updated: 26 October 2014.
Source: NB1

=== Results by round ===
Round	1	2	3	4	5	6	7	8	9	10	11	12	13	14	15	16	17	18	19	20	21	22	23	24	25	26	27	28	29	30
Ground	H	A	H	A	H	H	A	H	A	H	A	H																		
Result	L	D	D	D	L	L	W	D	W	L	L	L																		
Position	16	14	13	13	13	14	12	12	9	12	12	13																		

Updated to match(es) played on 26 October 2014. Source: Matches
A = Away; H = Home; W = Win; D = Draw; L = Loss

== Hungarian Cup ==
Pécsi MFC started its Hungarian Cup campaign of the season at Szászvár a nearby town in Baranya county, against the local team of the Hungarian fourth division. Pécsi MFC proceeded to the next round with a comfortable win of 3-0 with some of the young players on the pitch.

13 August 2014 Round 1	Szászvár	0 – 3	Pécs	Szászvár, Baranya County
17:00 CEST		Report	Lantos 35'; Pölöskei 50'; Frőhlich 54'	Stadium: Szászvár stadium Attendance: 200; Referee: (Hungary) Attila Szommer

10 September 2014 Round 2	SZEOL	1 – 4	Pécs	Szeged, Csongrád County
15:30 CEST	Faragó 27'	Report	Mohl 4' (pen.); Kővári 9', 36'; Frőhlich 57'	Stadium: Szegedi VSE Stadion; Attendance: 500; Referee: (Hungary) Tibor Farkas

23 September 2014 Round 3	Kozármisleny	0 – 5	Pécs	Kozármisleny, Baranya County
15:00 CEST		Report	Márkvárt 18' (pen.); Heffler 48'; Wittrédi 62', 65', 83'	Stadium: Stadion Alkotmány Square; Attendance: 500; Referee: (Hungary) József Berger

== League Cup ==
2 September 2014 1	Szigetszentmiklós	0 – 1	Pécs	Szigetszentmiklós, Pest County
16:30 CEST		Report	Rácz 84'	Stadium: Sport Street Stadion; Attendance: 200; Referee: (Hungary) Róbert Nagy

16 September 2014 2	Pécs	2 – 1	Soroksár	Pécs, Baranya County
18:00 CEST	Márkvárt 32' (pen.); Rácz 84'	Report	Kovács 66'	Stadium: Stadion PMFC; Attendance: 150; Referee: (Hungary) Attila Molnár

7 October 2014 3	Pécs	0 – 0	Puskás	Pécs, Baranya County
18:00 CEST		Report		Stadium: Stadion PMFC; Attendance: 200; Referee: (Hungary) József Berger

15 October 2014 4	Puskás	3 – 2	Pécs	Felcsút, Fejér County
15:00 CEST	Lencse 45'; Tischler 70'; Papp 80'	Report	Romić 9'; Frank 35'	Stadium: Pancho Arena; Attendance: 300; Referee: (Hungary) Szabolcs Szilasi

Pos	Team	Pld	W	D	L	GF	GA	GD	Pts	Qualification	SZI	PÉC	SOR	PUS
1	Szigetszentmiklós	6	3	2	1	10	3	+7	11	Advance to knockout phase	—	0–1	4–0	2–0
2	Pécs	6	3	2	1	8	5	+3	11	Advance to knockout phase	1–1	—	2–1	0–0
3	Soroksár	6	2	1	3	8	12	−4	7		1–1	0–2	—	3–2
4	Puskás Akadémia	6	1	1	4	6	12	−6	4		0–2	3–2	1–3	—

Source: Soccerway
