= 2013–14 Pécsi MFC season =

Pécs
2013–14 season
- Chairman: Dezső Matyi
- Manager: Emil Lőrincz & Gábor Márton
- Nemzeti Bajnokság I: 7th
- Hungarian Cup: Quarter-finals
- Hungarian League Cup: Quarter-finals
- Top goalscorer: League: Krisztián Koller (12); All: Krisztián Koller (13)
- Highest home attendance: 5,500 vs Ferencváros (27 July 2013)
- Lowest home attendance: 800 vs Paks (7 December 2013)
Home colours	Away colours

The 2013–14 season was Pécsi Mecsek Football Club's 49th competitive season, 3rd consecutive season in the OTP Bank Liga and 63rd year in existence as a football club.

== First team squad ==
Note: Flags indicate national team as defined under FIFA eligibility rules; some limited exceptions apply. Players may hold more than one non-FIFA nationality.

No.	Pos.	Nation	Player
1	GK	HUN	Gergő Gőcze
2	MF	HUN	Péter Beke
4	DF	HUN	József Nagy
5	DF	HUN	Ferenc Fodor
6	DF	HUN	Béla Balogh
7	MF	HUN	Dávid Wittrédi
8	MF	HUN	Dávid Márkvárt
9	FW	HUN	Krisztián Koller
10	FW	HUN	Roland Frőhlich
11	MF	HUN	Miroszláv Zsdrál
13	FW	SRB	Milan Perić (loan from Videoton)

No.	Pos.	Nation	Player
13	MF	SRB	Đorđe Jočić
17	MF	HUN	Adrián Horváth
18	DF	HUN	Levente Lantos
20	MF	HUN	Viktor Városi
21	DF	CRO	Danijel Romić
22	DF	HUN	Dávid Mohl
25	FW	HUN	Ferenc Rácz (loan from MTK)
27	MF	HUN	Róbert Kővári
32	MF	HUN	Lóránd Szatmári
37	MF	HUN	Dávid Bailo
60	FW	HUN	Péter Pölöskey (loan from Debrecen)

== Transfers ==
=== Summer ===
In: Note: Flags indicate national team as defined under FIFA eligibility rules; some limited exceptions apply. Players may hold more than one non-FIFA nationality.

No.	Pos.	Nation	Player
1	GK	HUN	Gergő Gőcze (from Szombathely)
3	DF	HUN	Bence Deutsch (loan from MTK)
4	DF	HUN	József Nagy (loan return from Kozármisleny)
10	DF	HUN	Roland Frőhlich (loan return from Kozármisleny)
13	MF	SRB	Đorđe Jočić (from (Serbia) Radnički Sombor)
14	MF	HUN	Dominik Nagy (loan return from Kozármisleny)
20	MF	HUN	Viktor Városi (loan return from Kozármisleny)
21	DF	CRO	Danijel Romić (from Kozármisleny)
22	DF	HUN	Dávid Mohl (from Kecskemét)
25	MF	HUN	Ferenc Rácz (loan from MTK)
27	MF	HUN	Róbert Kővári (from Pécs Academy)
31	GK	HUN	Bence Steer (from Rákospalota)
60	FW	HUN	Péter Pölöskey (loan from Debrecen)

Out: Note: Flags indicate national team as defined under FIFA eligibility rules; some limited exceptions apply. Players may hold more than one non-FIFA nationality.

No.	Pos.	Nation	Player
1	GK	HUN	Péter Molnár (loan to Kozármisleny)
10	MF	HUN	Olivér Nagy (to Paks)
14	MF	HUN	Dominik Nagy (to Ferencváros)
16	GK	HUN	András Sánta (to Szigetszentmiklós)
20	DF	HUN	Pál Lázár (to Debrecen)
20	FW	NGA	Solomon Okoronkwo (to (Germany) Ezgebirge Aue)
25	DF	CZE	Jiří Krejčí (to (Czech Republic) Vysočina Jihlava)
26	DF	CRO	Andrej Čaušić
28	DF	CIV	Jean-Baptiste Akassou (to (Greece) Niki Volos)
69	FW	HUN	Zsolt Horváth (to MTK)
99	FW	HUN	Attila Simon (loan return to Paks)

=== Winter ===
In: Note: Flags indicate national team as defined under FIFA eligibility rules; some limited exceptions apply. Players may hold more than one non-FIFA nationality.

No.	Pos.	Nation	Player
13	FW	SRB	Milan Perić (loan from Videoton)
15	GK	HUN	Donát Helesfay (loan return from Kozármisleny)
20	MF	HUN	Miroszláv Zsdrál (loan return from Kozármisleny)
—	GK	HUN	Péter Molnár (loan return from Kozármisleny)

Out: Note: Flags indicate national team as defined under FIFA eligibility rules; some limited exceptions apply. Players may hold more than one non-FIFA nationality.

No.	Pos.	Nation	Player
3	DF	HUN	Bence Deutsch (loan return to MTK Budapest)
11	FW	SRB	Miroslav Grumić (to Diósgyőr)
12	GK	HUN	Dénes Dibusz (to Ferencváros)
33	DF	NGA	Eke Uzoma (to (Germany) Sandhausen)

- List of Hungarian football transfers summer 2013
- List of Hungarian football transfers winter 2013–14

== Statistics ==
=== Appearances and goals ===
Last updated on 1 June 2014.

No.	Pos	Nat	Player	Total		OTP Bank Liga		Hungarian Cup		League Cup	
No.	Pos	Nat	Player	Apps	Goals	Apps	Goals	Apps	Goals	Apps	Goals
1	GK	(Hungary) HUN	Gergő Gőcze	27	-31	21	-23	4	-5	2	-3
2	MF	(Hungary) HUN	Péter Beke	11	1	5	0	1	0	5	1
4	DF	(Hungary) HUN	József Nagy	32	0	22	0	4	0	6	0
5	DF	(Hungary) HUN	Ferenc Fodor	30	1	21	1	4	0	5	0
6	DF	(Hungary) HUN	Béla Balogh	32	0	23	0	4	0	5	0
7	MF	(Hungary) HUN	Dávid Wittrédi	36	2	23	0	5	0	8	2
8	MF	(Hungary) HUN	Dávid Márkvárt	38	2	29	2	4	0	5	0
9	FW	(Hungary) HUN	Krisztián Koller	25	13	20	12	3	1	2	0
10	FW	(Hungary) HUN	Roland Frőhlich	24	2	21	2	3	0	0	0
11	MF	(Hungary) HUN	Miroszláv Zsdrál	11	0	7	0	1	0	3	0
13	FW	(Serbia) SRB	Milan Perić	10	4	5	0	2	0	3	4
13	MF	(Serbia) SRB	Đorđe Jočić	7	0	1	0	0	0	6	0
17	MF	(Hungary) HUN	Adrián Horváth	34	0	27	0	4	0	3	0
18	DF	(Hungary) HUN	Levente Lantos	13	1	4	0	1	0	8	1
20	MF	(Hungary) HUN	Viktor Városi	24	1	14	0	1	0	9	1
21	DF	(Croatia) CRO	Danijel Romić	33	2	28	2	4	0	1	0
22	DF	(Hungary) HUN	Dávid Mohl	34	6	26	4	4	1	4	1
25	FW	(Hungary) HUN	Ferenc Rácz	24	1	12	0	3	0	9	1
27	MF	(Hungary) HUN	Róbert Kővári	27	4	17	4	3	0	7	0
32	DF	(Hungary) HUN	Lóránd Szatmári	33	4	29	3	3	1	1	0
37	MF	(Hungary) HUN	Dávid Bailo	9	0	4	0	1	0	4	0
60	FW	(Hungary) HUN	Péter Pölöskei	24	8	16	5	3	1	5	2
Youth players:
5	DF	(Canada) CAN	James Manjrekar	2	0	0	0	0	0	2	0
6	MF	(Hungary) HUN	Sándor Erdős	3	0	0	0	0	0	3	0
13	FW	(Hungary) HUN	Tamás Turi	4	0	0	0	0	0	4	0
14	MF	(Hungary) HUN	Miklós Gaál	3	0	0	0	0	0	3	0
15	DF	(Hungary) HUN	Attila Havas	3	0	0	0	0	0	3	0
15	GK	(Hungary) HUN	Donát Helesfay	4	-9	0	0	1	-4	3	-5
19	DF	(Hungary) HUN	Gergő Gajág	4	0	0	0	0	0	4	0
22	FW	(Hungary) HUN	Patrik Gránicz	2	0	0	0	0	0	2	0
31	GK	(Hungary) HUN	Bence Steer	1	-4	0	0	0	0	1	-4
Players no longer at the club:
3	DF	(Hungary) HUN	Bence Deutsch	12	1	4	0	2	0	6	1
11	FW	(Serbia) SRB	Miroslav Grumić	18	6	14	3	2	1	2	2
12	GK	(Hungary) HUN	Dénes Dibusz	14	-17	10	-15	0	0	4	-2
33	MF	(Nigeria) NGA	Eke Uzoma	19	1	15	1	3	0	1	0

=== Top scorers ===
Includes all competitive matches. The list is sorted by shirt number when total goals are equal.

Last updated on 1 June 2014

Position	Nation	Number	Name	OTP Bank Liga	Hungarian Cup	League Cup	Total
1	(Hungary)	9	Krisztián Koller	12	1	0	13
2	(Hungary)	60	Péter Pölöskei	5	1	2	8
3	(Hungary)	22	Dávid Mohl	4	1	1	6
4	(Serbia)	11	Miroslav Grumić	3	1	2	6
5	(Hungary)	27	Róbert Kővári	4	0	0	4
6	(Hungary)	32	Lóránd Szatmári	3	1	0	4
7	(Serbia)	13	Milan Perić	0	0	4	4
8	(Hungary)	10	Roland Frőhlich	2	0	0	2
9	(Croatia)	21	Danijel Romić	2	0	0	2
10	(Hungary)	8	Dávid Márkvárt	2	0	0	2
11	(Hungary)	7	Dávid Wittrédi	0	0	2	2
12	(Nigeria)	33	Eke Uzoma	1	0	0	1
13	(Hungary)	5	Ferenc Fodor	1	0	0	1
14	(Hungary)	18	Levente Lantos	0	0	1	1
15	(Hungary)	2	Péter Beke	0	0	1	1
16	(Hungary)	20	Viktor Városi	0	0	1	1
17	(Hungary)	25	Ferenc Rácz	0	0	1	1
18	(Hungary)	3	Bence Deutsch	0	0	1	1
/	/	/	Own Goals	2	0	1	3
			TOTALS	41	5	17	63

=== Disciplinary record ===
Includes all competitive matches. Players with 1 card or more included only.

Last updated on 1 June 2014

Position	Nation	Number	Name	OTP Bank Liga		Hungarian Cup		League Cup		Total (Hu Total)	
Position	Nation	Number	Name	Booked	Sent off (straight red)	Booked	Sent off (straight red)	Booked	Sent off (straight red)	Booked	Sent off (straight red)
GK	(Hungary)	1	Gergő Gőcze	1	0	0	0	0	0	1 (1)	0 (0)
MF	(Hungary)	2	Péter Beke	0	0	0	1	2	0	2 (0)	1 (0)
DF	(Hungary)	3	Bence Deutsch	0	0	0	0	1	0	1 (0)	0 (0)
DF	(Hungary)	4	József Nagy	5	0	2	0	1	0	8 (5)	0 (0)
DF	(Hungary)	5	Ferenc Fodor	5	0	0	0	0	0	5 (5)	0 (0)
DF	(Hungary)	6	Béla Balogh	3	1	1	0	0	0	4 (3)	1 (1)
MF	(Hungary)	7	Dávid Wittrédi	2	0	0	0	1	0	3 (2)	0 (0)
MF	(Hungary)	8	Dávid Márkvárt	5	0	0	0	0	0	5 (5)	0 (0)
FW	(Hungary)	9	Krisztián Koller	4	0	0	0	1	0	5 (4)	0 (0)
FW	(Hungary)	10	Roland Frőhlich	3	0	0	0	0	0	3 (3)	0 (0)
FW	(Serbia)	11	Miroslav Grumić	4	1	0	0	1	0	5 (4)	1 (1)
GK	(Hungary)	12	Dénes Dibusz	0	1	0	0	0	0	0 (0)	1 (1)
FW	(Serbia)	13	Milan Perić	0	0	1	0	0	0	1 (0)	0 (0)
MF	(Hungary)	17	Adrián Horváth	4	0	0	0	0	0	4 (4)	0 (0)
DF	(Hungary)	18	Levente Lantos	0	0	0	0	1	0	1 (0)	0 (0)
MF	(Hungary)	20	Viktor Városi	1	0	0	0	3	0	4 (1)	0 (0)
DF	(Croatia)	21	Danijel Romić	5	0	1	0	0	0	6 (5)	0 (0)
DF	(Hungary)	22	Dávid Mohl	6	1	0	0	1	0	7 (6)	1 (1)
FW	(Hungary)	25	Ferenc Rácz	1	0	1	0	1	0	3 (1)	0 (0)
MF	(Hungary)	27	Róbert Kővári	1	0	0	0	1	0	2 (1)	0 (0)
MF	(Hungary)	32	Lóránd Szatmári	1	1	0	0	0	0	1 (1)	1 (1)
MF	(Nigeria)	33	Eke Uzoma	1	1	0	0	0	0	1 (1)	1 (1)
MF	(Hungary)	37	Dávid Bailo	1	0	0	0	0	0	1 (1)	0 (0)
FW	(Hungary)	60	Péter Pölöskei	3	1	1	0	0	0	4 (3)	1 (1)
			TOTALS	56	7	7	1	14	0	77 (56)	8 (7)

=== Overall ===
Games played	45 (30 OTP Bank Liga, 5 Hungarian Cup and 10 Hungarian League Cup)
Games won	18 (12 OTP Bank Liga, 2 Hungarian Cup and 4 Hungarian League Cup)
Games drawn	13 (9 OTP Bank Liga, 1 Hungarian Cup and 3 Hungarian League Cup)
Games lost	14 (9 OTP Bank Liga, 2 Hungarian Cup and 3 Hungarian League Cup)
Goals scored	63
Goals conceded	61
Goal difference	+2
Yellow cards	77
Red cards	8
Worst discipline	(Hungary) Dávid Mohl (7 (yellow card) , 1 (red card) )
Best result	3–0 (H) v Zalaegerszeg – Ligakupa – 04-09-2013
Best result	5–2 (A) v Győr – OTP Bank Liga – 09-03-2014
Worst result	1–5 (A) v Videoton – OTP Bank Liga – 11-08-2013
Worst result	0–5 (4) v Újpest – Magyar Kupa – 26-03-2014
Most appearances	(Hungary) Dávid Márkvárt (38 appearances)
Top scorer	(Hungary) Krisztián Koller (13 goals)
Points	67/135 (49.63%)

Last updated: 1 June 2014

== Nemzeti Bajnokság I ==
=== Matches ===
27 July 2013 1	Pécs	1–2	Ferencváros	Pécs, Baranya County
19:00 CEST	Koller 59'	(Report)	Tuyp 28'; Valpoort 77'	Stadium: Stadion PMFC; Attendance: 5,500; Referee: (Hungary) Zsolt Szabó

2 August 2013 2	Paks	2–1	Pécs	Paks, Tolna County
19:00 CEST	Simon 19', 77'	(Report)	Koller 50' (pen.)	Stadium: Stadion PSE; Attendance: 1,200; Referee: (Hungary) Sándor Andó-Szabó

11 August 2013 3	Videoton	5–1	Pécs	Székesfehérvár, Fejér County
16:30 CEST	Nikolić 27' (pen.), 44'; Vinícius 35'; Sándor 70'; Alvarez 77'	(Report)	Frőhlich 24'	Stadium: Sóstói Stadion; Attendance: 3,320; Referee: (Hungary) Tamás Bognár

17 August 2013 4	Pécs	1–1	Győr	Pécs, Baranya County
19:00 CEST	Koller 11' (pen.)	(Report)	Trajković 16'	Stadium: Stadion PMFC; Attendance: 2,100; Referee: (Hungary) István Vad

24 August 2013 5	MTK	0–1	Pécs	Budapest, Pest County
19:00 CEST		(Report)	Pölöskey 46'	Stadium: Hidegkuti Nándor Stadium; Attendance: 1,500; Referee: (Hungary) Ádám Németh

1 September 2013 6	Pécs	2–1	Debrecen	Pécs, Baranya County
16:30 CEST	Koller 31', 67'	(Report)	Volaš 5'	Stadium: Stadion PMFC; Attendance: 2,200; Referee: (Hungary) Dániel Becséri

14 September 2013 7	Kecskemét	2–5	Pécs	Kecskemét, Bács-Kiskun County
16:00 CEST	Savić 9'; Eliomar 22' (pen.)	(Report)	Uzoma 42'; Romić 45'; Mohl 50'; Márkvárt 82'; Pölöskey 85'	Stadium: Széktói Stadion; Attendance: 600; Referee: (Hungary) Dániel Becséri

20 September 2013 8	Pécs	1–3	Pápa	Pécs, Baranya County
19:00 CEST	Mohl 43' (pen.)	(Report)	Orosz 6'; Quintero 39', 64'	Stadium: Stadion PMFC; Attendance: 1,700; Referee: (Hungary) István Vad

29 September 2013 9	Újpest	1–1	Pécs	Budapest, Pest County
18:30 CEST	Simon 45'	(Report)	Grumić 12'	Stadium: Szusza Ferenc Stadium; Attendance: 1,847; Referee: (Hungary) Tamás Bognár

5 October 2013 10	Pécs	1–2	Puskás	Pécs, Baranya County
16:00 CEST	Frőhlich 88'	(Report)	Lencse 4', 35'	Stadium: Stadion PMFC; Attendance: 1,200; Referee: (Hungary) József Erdős

19 October 2013 11	Honvéd	3–1	Pécs	Budapest, Pest County
20:00 CEST	Lovrić 50'; Daud 78' (pen.); Hidi 79'	(Report)	Grumić 8'	Stadium: Bozsik Stadion; Attendance: 800; Referee: (Hungary) Dániel Becséri

26 October 2013 12	Pécs	3–1	Kaposvár	Pécs, Baranya County
16:00 CEST	Szatmári 50'; Koller 66', 80'	(Report)	Waltner 84'	Stadium: Stadion PMFC; Attendance: 1,000; Referee: (Hungary) István Vad

2 November 2013 13	Mezőkövesd	0–1	Pécs	Mezőkövesd, Borsod-Abaúj-Zemplén County
16:00 CET		(Report)	Fodor 54'	Stadium: Mezőkövesdi Városi Stadion; Attendance: 2,800; Referee: (Hungary) Tamás Bognár

9 November 2013 14	Pécs	1–1	Diósgyőr	Pécs, Baranya County
18:00 CET	Grumić 3'	(Report)	Bacsa 58'	Stadium: Stadion PMFC; Attendance: 1,200; Referee: (Hungary) Péter Solymosi

23 November 2013 15	Haladás	1–3	Pécs	Szombathely, Vas County
16:00 CET	Fehér 7'	(Report)	Romić 40'; Szatmári 69'; Koller 86'	Stadium: Rohonci Street Stadium; Attendance: 1,850; Referee: (Hungary) József Erdős

30 November 2013 16	Ferencváros	1–2	Pécs	Budapest, Pest County
20:00 CET	Böde 6'	(Report)	Mateos 13' (o.g.); Koller 39' (pen.)	Stadium: Ferenc Puskás Stadium; Attendance: 3,423; Referee: (Hungary) Ádám Farkas

7 December 2013 17	Pécs	1–1	Paks	Pécs, Baranya County
16:00 CET	Mohl 61' (pen.)	(Report)	Simon 9'	Stadium: Stadion PMFC; Attendance: 800; Referee: (Hungary) Viktor Kassai

1 March 2014 18	Pécs	1–1	Videoton	Pécs, Baranya County
18:00 CET	Kővári 60'	(Report)	Gyurcsó 23'	Stadium: Stadion PMFC; Attendance: 2,000; Referee: (Hungary) Sándor Andó-Szabó

8 March 2014 19	Győr	2–5	Pécs	Győr, Győr-Moson-Sopron County
20:00 CET	Kalmár 22'; Wolfe 49'	(Report)	Pölöskey 4'; Szatmári 9'; Koller 52', 87' (pen.); Kővári 65'	Stadium: ETO Park; Attendance: 2,500; Referee: (Hungary) Viktor Kassai

16 March 2014 20	Pécs	1–0	MTK	Pécs, Baranya County
16:30 CET	Koller 44' (pen.)	(Report)		Stadium: Stadion PMFC; Attendance: 2,500; Referee: (Hungary) Zsolt Szabó

22 March 2014 21	Debrecen	1–0	Pécs	Debrecen, Hajdú-Bihar County
14:00 CET	Tisza 90' (pen.)	(Report)		Stadium: Stadion Oláh Gábor Út; Attendance: 6,500; Referee: (Hungary) Sándor Andó-Szabó

29 March 2014 22	Pécs	0–0	Kecskemét	Pécs, Baranya County
16:00 CET		(Report)		Stadium: Stadion PMFC; Attendance: 2,000; Referee: (Hungary) István Vad

5 April 2014 23	Pápa	1–0	Pécs	Pápa, Veszprém County
16:00 CEST	Nagy 29'	(Report)		Stadium: Stadion Várkerti; Attendance: 1,200; Referee: (Hungary) Mihály Fábián

11 April 2014 24	Pécs	0–0	Újpest	Pécs, Baranya County
19:00 CEST		(Report)		Stadium: Stadion PMFC; Attendance: 1,600; Referee: (Hungary) Zoltán Iványi

18 April 2014 25	Puskás	1–1	Pécs	Székesfehérvár, Fejér County
19:00 CEST	Szakály 6' (pen.)	(Report)	Pölöskei 24'	Stadium: Sóstói Stadion; Attendance: 200; Referee: (Hungary) Ádám Farkas

27 April 2014 26	Pécs	1–0	Honvéd	Pécs, Baranya County
18:30 CEST	Kővári 29'	(Report)		Stadium: Stadion PMFC; Attendance: 1,300; Referee: (Hungary) Ádám Németh

3 May 2014 27	Kaposvár	0–2	Pécs	Kaposvár, Somogy County
14:00 CEST		(Report)	Kővári 61'; Mohl 76' (pen.)	Stadium: Stadion Kaposvár Rákóczi; Attendance: 1,200; Referee: (Hungary) Zoltán Iványi

10 May 2014 28	Pécs	2–1	Mezőkövesd	Pécs, Baranya County
16:00 CEST	Szalai 39' (o.g.); Márkvárt 90+2'	(Report)	Balajti 29'	Stadium: Stadion PMFC; Attendance: 1,000; Referee: (Hungary) István Vad

17 May 2014 29	Diósgyőr	3–0	Pécs	Miskolc, Borsod-Abaúj-Zemplén County
16:00 CEST	Futács 50'; Grumić 77'; Batioja 79'	(Report)		Stadium: DVTK Stadion; Attendance: 3,797; Referee: (Hungary) Dániel Becséri

30 May 2014 30	Pécs	1–1	Haladás	Pécs, Baranya County
19:00 CEST	Pölöskei 6'	(Report)	Dvorschák 14'	Stadium: Stadion PMFC; Attendance: 1,100; Referee: (Hungary) Dániel Becséri

=== Classification ===
Pos	Team	Pld	W	D	L	GF	GA	GD	Pts	Qualification or relegation
5	Diósgyőr	30	12	11	7	45	38	+7	47	Qualification for Europa League first qualifying round (Note: Diósgyőr qualified for the Europa League first qualifying round as the 2013–14 Magyar Kupa runners-up since the winners, Újpest, failed to receive the UEFA license to participate in European competitions.)
6	Haladás	30	12	10	8	37	31	+6	46	
7	Pécs	30	12	9	9	41	38	+3	45	
8	MTK	30	11	7	12	42	36	+6	40	
9	Honvéd	30	10	6	14	37	39	−2	36	

Source: mlsz.hu (in Hungarian)
Rules for classification: 1st points; 2nd overall wins; 3rd goal difference; 4th head-to-head points; 5th head-to-head goal difference; 6th head-to-head away goals scored; 7th fair-play points; 8th drawing of lots

=== Results summary ===
Overall								Home						Away					
Pld	W	D	L	GF	GA	GD	Pts	W	D	L	GF	GA	GD	W	D	L	GF	GA	GD
30	12	9	9	41	38	+3	45	5	7	3	17	15	+2	7	2	6	24	23	+1

Last updated: 1 June 2014.
Source: NB1

=== Results by round ===
Round	1	2	3	4	5	6	7	8	9	10	11	12	13	14	15	16	17	18	19	20	21	22	23	24	25	26	27	28	29	30
Ground	H	A	A	H	A	H	A	H	A	H	A	H	A	H	A	A	H	H	A	H	A	H	A	H	A	H	A	H	A	H
Result	L	L	L	D	W	W	W	L	D	L	L	W	W	D	W	W	D	D	W	W	L	D	L	D	D	W	W	W	L	D
Position	11	13	15	14	12	11	7	9	10	11	12	10	9	9	8	6	7	8	6	5	6	8	8	7	7	7	7	6	7	7

Updated to match(es) played on 1 June 2014. Source: Matches
A = Away; H = Home; W = Win; D = Draw; L = Loss

== Hungarian Cup ==
30 October 2013 Round of 32	Pécs	2–1	Mezőkövesd	Pécs, Baranya County
18:00 CET	Koller 19'; Szatmári 51'	(Report)	Harsányi 54'	Stadium: Stadion PMFC; Attendance: 400; Referee: (Hungary) Csaba Pintér

26 November 2013 Round of 16 (1st leg)	Honvéd	1–1	Pécs	Budapest, Pest County
18:00 CET	Daud 50'	(Report)	Mohl 59'	Stadium: Bozsik Stadion; Attendance: 150; Referee: (Hungary) Tamás Bognár

4 December 2013 Round of 16 (2nd leg)	Pécs	1–0 (2–1 agg.)	Honvéd	Pécs, Baranya County
18:00 CET	Grumić 88'	Report		Stadium: Stadion PMFC; Attendance: 800; Referee: (Hungary) Sándor Andó-Szabó

12 March 2014 Quarter-final (1st leg)	Pécs	1–3	Újpest	Pécs, Baranya County
18:00 CET	Pölöskey 85'	(Report)	Vasiljević 63', 72' (pen.), 80'	Stadium: Stadion PMFC; Attendance: 1,800; Referee: (Hungary) Mihály Fábián

26 March 2014 Quarter-final (2nd leg)	Újpest	4–0 (7–1 agg.)	Pécs	Budapest, Pest County
18:00 CET	Balogh 30'; Zamostny 34', 48'; Suljić 54'	Report		Stadium: Ferenc Szusza Stadium; Attendance: 2,000; Referee: (Hungary) Péter Solymosi

== League Cup ==
=== Group stage ===
4 September 2013 1	Pécs	3–0	Zalaegerszeg	Pécs, Baranya County
18:00 CEST	Lantos 25'; Péter Beke 42'; Városi 83'	(Report)		Stadium: Stadion PMFC; Attendance: 300; Referee: (Hungary) Gergely Szőts

11 September 2013 2	Siófok	0–2	Pécs	Siófok, Somogy County
16:00 CEST		(Report)	Grumić 25'; Pölöskey 62'	Stadium: Révész Street Stadium; Attendance: 100; Referee: (Hungary) Norbert Kiss

9 October 2013 3	Pécs	2–0	Kaposvár	Pécs, Baranya County
18:00 CEST	Wittrédi 19'; Rácz 90+2'	(Report)		Stadium: Stadion PMFC; Attendance: 300; Referee: (Hungary) Balázs Böcskei

16 October 2013 4	Kaposvár	2–1	Pécs	Kaposvár, Somogy County
16:00 CEST	Dominic 64', 78'	(Report)	Pölöskey 61'	Stadium: Stadion Kaposvár Rákóczi; Attendance: 150; Referee: (Hungary) Balázs Berke

13 November 2013 5	Pécs	2–2	Siófok	Pécs, Baranya County
18:00 CET	Grumić 47'; Fehér 89' (o.g.)	(Report)	Nagy 45'; Bogáti 85'	Stadium: Stadion PMFC; Attendance: 200; Referee: (Hungary) Zoltán J. Kovács

20 November 2013 6	Zalaegerszeg	4–2	Pécs	Zalaegerszeg, Zala County
13:00 CET	Vayer 18' (pen.), 55'; Pál 83'; Sipőcz 89'	(Report)	Wittrédi 10'; Deutsch 35'	Stadium: ZTE Arena; Attendance: 150; Referee: (Hungary) Katalin Kulcsár

==== Classification ====
Pos	Team	Pld	W	D	L	GF	GA	GD	Pts	Qualification
1	Kaposvár	6	5	0	1	19	4	+15	15	Advance to knockout phase
2	Pécs	6	3	1	2	12	8	+4	10	Advance to knockout phase
3	Siófok	6	2	1	3	7	15	−8	7	
4	Zalaegerszeg	6	1	0	5	5	16	−11	3	

Rules for classification: 1) points; 2) goal difference; 3) number of goals scored.

=== Knockout phase ===
22 February 2014 Round of 16 (1st leg)	Pécs	1–1	Paks	Pécs, Baranya County
16:00 CET	Mohl 22'	(Report)	Horváth 41'	Stadium: Stadion PMFC; Attendance: 400; Referee: (Hungary) Szabolcs Szilasi

4 March 2014 Round of 16 (2nd leg)	Paks	1–3 (2–4 agg.)	Pécs	Paks, Tolna County
14:00 CET	Lázok 6'	(Report)	Perić 59' (pen.), 65', 67'	Stadium: Stadion PSE; Attendance: 500; Referee: (Hungary) József Berger

18 March 2014 Quarter-final (1st leg)	Pécs	1–1	Videoton	Pécs, Baranya County
17:30 CET	Perić 34'	(Report)	Nikolić 61'	Stadium: Stadion PMFC; Attendance: 300; Referee: (Hungary) Zoltán Iványi

2 April 2014 Quarter-final (2nd leg)	Videoton	3–0 (4–1 agg.)	Pécs	Székesfehérvár, Fejér County
17:30 CEST	Juhász 21'; Haraszti 71'; Zé Luís 84'	(Report)		Stadium: Sóstói Stadion; Attendance: 300; Referee: (Hungary) Ádám Farkas

== Pre-season ==
26 June 2013 1	NK Osijek (Croatia)	1–0	(Hungary) Pécsi Mecsek FC	Osijek, Croatia
CEST	Barišić 89'	(Report)		Stadium: Stadion Gradski vrt Attendance: 100; Referee: (Croatia) Kotka

29 June 2013 2	Pécsi Mecsek FC (Hungary)	2–1	(Russia) FC Gazovik Orenburg	Balatonboglár, Somogy County
CEST	Rácz 36'; Frőhlich 56'	(Report)	Akhmedov 22'	Stadium: Városi Sporttelep

6 July 2013 3	Pécsi Mecsek FC (Hungary)	2–1	(Hungary) Paksi SE	Pécs, Baranya County
CEST	Wittrédi 24'; Koller 62' (pen.)	(Report)	Hullám 90'	Stadium: Stadion PMFC; Attendance: 300; Referee: (Hungary) János Botló

10 July 2013 4	NK Slaven Belupo (Croatia)	2–2	(Hungary) Pécsi Mecsek FC	Koprivnica, Croatia
CEST	Glavica 50'; Delić 58'	(Report)	Grumić 24'; Balogh 47'	Stadium: Gradski stadion

13 July 2013 5	NK Veržej (Slovenia)	0–2	(Hungary) Pécsi Mecsek FC	Veržej, Slovenia
CEST		(Report)	Grumić 24', 57'	Stadium: Čistina Stadium

17 July 2013 6	Pécsi Mecsek FC (Hungary)	5–1	(Croatia) HNK Cibalia	Pécs, Baranya County
CEST	Szatmári; Koller; Városi; Wittrédi; Frőhlich	(Report)	Bartolović	Stadium: Stadion PMFC; Attendance: 500; Referee: (Hungary) Béla Botló

20 July 2013 7	Pécsi Mecsek FC (Hungary)	1–0	(Turkey) Kardemir D. Ç. Karabükspor	Bakovci, Slovenia
CEST	Szatmári 19'	(Report)
