= Manjrekar James =

Canadian soccer player (born 1993)

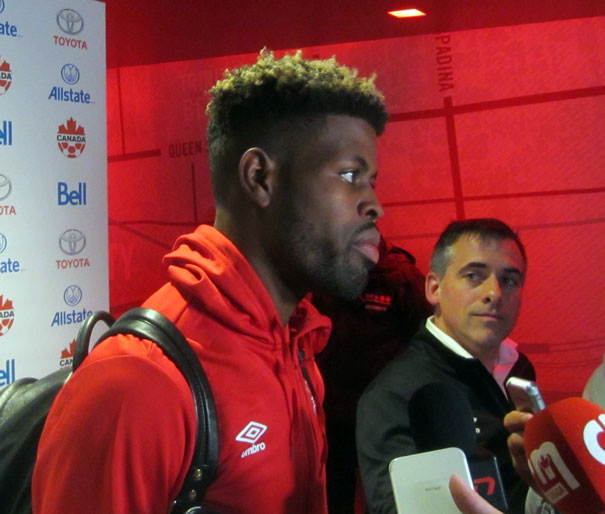
- James in 2018

Personal information
- Date of birth: August 5, 1993 (age 33)
- Place of birth: Roseau, Dominica
- Height: 1.91 m (6 ft 3 in)
- Position: Centre-back

Youth career
- 2003–2009: North York Hearts-Azzuri
- 2009–2012: Sigma FC
- 2012–2014: Pécs

Senior career*
Years	Team	Apps	(Gls)
2014–2015	Pécs	16	(1)
2015–2016	Diósgyőr	17	(0)
2016–2018	Vasas	39	(2)
2018–2021	Midtjylland	14	(0)
2018–2019	→ Fredericia (loan)	17	(1)
2021	→ Lamia (loan)	7	(0)
2021–2022	Vejle	13	(0)
2022	→ Chornomorets Odesa (loan)	0	(0)
2022–2023	Chornomorets Odesa	13	(1)
2023	Forge FC	26	(0)
2024–2025	Alajuelense	38	(1)
2025	→ Santos de Guápiles (loan)	3	(0)
2025–2026	Wellington Phoenix	20	(2)
2026–	Forge FC	8	(1)

International career^{‡}
2013	Canada U20	1	(0)
2015	Canada U23	3	(0)
2015–2020	Canada	17	(2)
- * Club domestic league appearances and goals as of 25 October 2026 ‡ National team caps and goals as of January 7, 2020

Manjrekar James (/mʌnˈdʒreɪkər/; born August 5, 1993) is a professional soccer player plays as a centre-back for Canadian Premier League club Forge FC. Born in Dominica, he became a Canadian citizen during his youth and earned 17 caps with the national team, appearing at the 2017 CONCACAF Gold Cup.

== Early life ==
James was born in Roseau, Dominica. His father was born in Pichelin, and his mother was born in Grand Bay. James and his parents moved to North York, Ontario, Canada, when he was nine years old. At age 10, James signed for North York Hearts-Azzuri youth soccer club. At age 16, James signed for Sigma FC of the Ontario Soccer League. At age 18, James went on trial with RCD Mallorca of La Liga. Although he had a successful trial at the club, James was not signed because of strict visa laws for foreign players in Spain. Following his trial at Mallorca, James went on a 10-day trial with SC Paderborn 07 of the 2. Bundesliga. During the trial, James went directly into training with the first team but was ultimately not signed.

== Club career ==
=== Pécsi ===
In mid April 2013, James went on trial with Pécsi MFC of the Nemzeti Bajnokság I. After several months of training with the reserve squad, James was offered a contract. James made his professional debut March 18, 2014, in a Ligakupa, the Hungarian league cup, match against Videoton FC. James made his league debut for Pécsi on October 18, 2014, coming on as a late substitute for Roland Frőhlich and playing two minutes in a 2–0 defeat to Ferencvárosi. At the end of the season, Pécs were relegated to the Hungarian fourth division due an unstable financial situation. James and many other first team players were subsequently released.

=== Diósgyőri ===
After leaving Pécs, James signed with fellow Hungarian club Diósgyőri VTK on August 25, 2015.

=== Vasas ===
James moved to fellow Hungarian side Vasas on June 8, 2016. Prior to the 2017–18 Vasas season, James was criticized by the club for playing internationally with Canada during the 2017 Gold Cup, while Vasas played in the first round of the Europa League qualifiers. He started regularly for Vasas in 2017–18.

=== Midtjylland ===
James joined Danish Superliga side Midtjylland on June 12, 2018, signing a four-year deal. He was immediately loaned to Danish 1st Division Fredericia for the 2018–19 season. James made his debut for Fredericia on July 29 against Næstved, and scored his first goal for the club on August 5 against Roskilde. In January 2019, Midtjylland recalled him from Fredericia. He made his competitive debut for Midtjylland on March 13, starting in a 2018–19 Danish Cup match against Kolding IF. He made his league debut five days later on March 17 against SönderjyskE. Having featured in nine first team games in his first two years with the club, in March 2020 James signed a contract extension with Midtjylland until December 2023. He played in the UEFA Champions League while playing for them.

==== Loan to Lamia ====
On January 25, 2021, James joined PAS Lamia 1964 on loan for the rest of the season.

=== Vejle ===
On July 1, 2021, it was announced that James had signed with Vejle Boldklub. On February 22, 2022, he was loaned out to Ukrainian club FC Chornomorets Odesa for the rest of 2022.

=== Forge FC ===
On March 10, 2023, James signed with Forge FC of the Canadian Premier League. This move reunited James with manager Bobby Smyrniotis who had previously coached him as a youth at Sigma FC. He was regarded to have established himself as a regular starter while playing for the club.

In October 2023, he helped Forge win their fourth league title, following a 2–1 win over Cavalry FC in the play-off final.

=== Alajuelense ===
On December 30, 2023, it was announced that James would join Costa Rican club Alajuelense for an undisclosed fee.

=== Wellington Phoenix ===
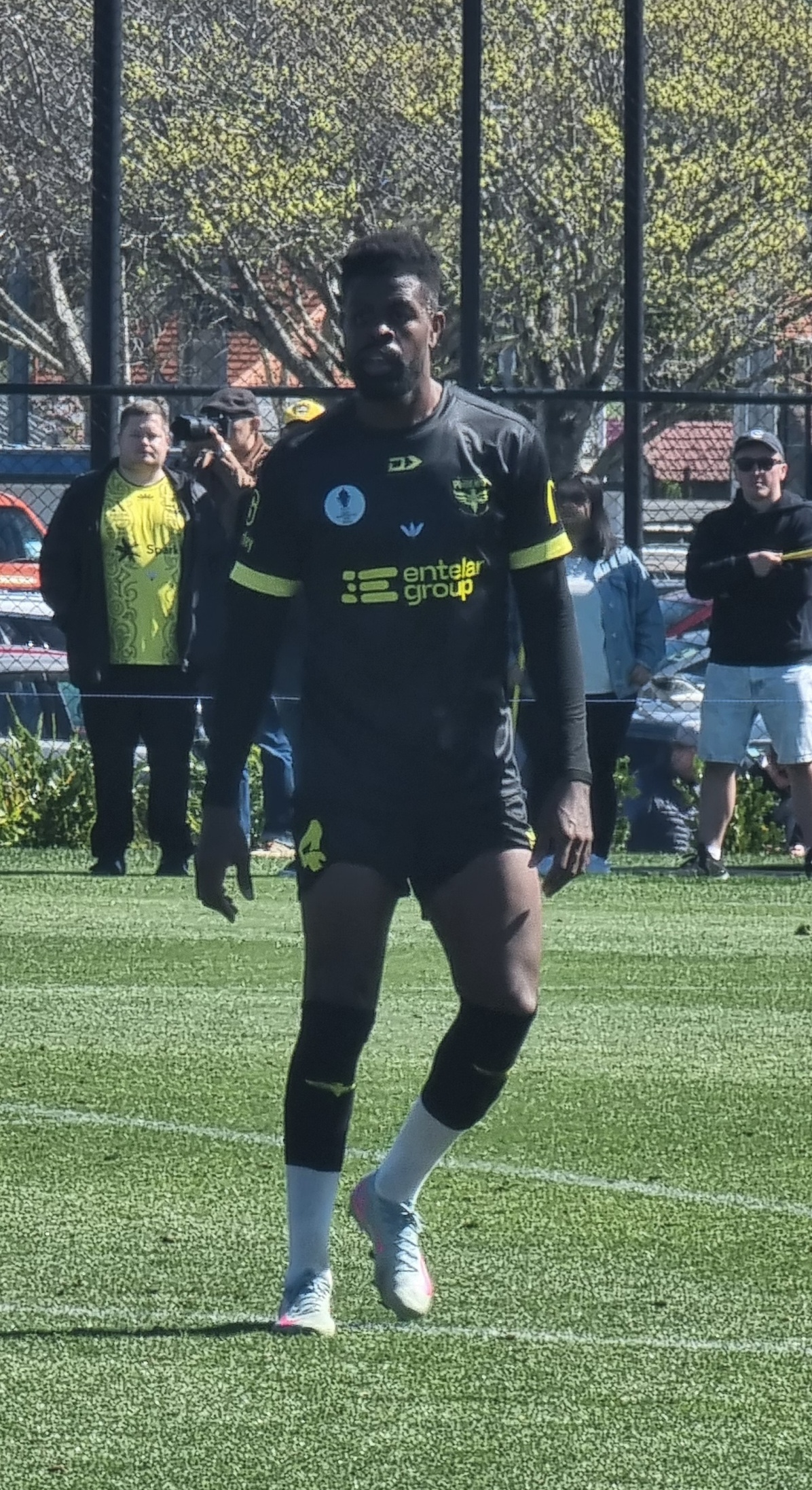
James playing for the Wellington Phoenix in 2025.

On August 21, 2025, New Zealand club Wellington Phoenix of the A-League Men signed James on a one-year contract. James made his club debut for the Phoenix on October 18, 2025, in a 2–2 draw away to Perth Glory. On December 6, 2025, James received his first red card in the New Zealand Derby after bringing down Sam Cosgrove. Auckland FC went on to win the match 3–1.

On 29 May 2026, the club confirmed James' departure.

== International career ==
=== Youth ===
James was called into camp with the Canada U18 squad in December 2011. In 2012 and 2013, he was again called into several camps with the U20 team in preparation for the 2013 CONCACAF U-20 Championship in Mexico. In the tournament, James made one appearance, a 4–2 defeat to the United States in which he received a red card ejection.

=== Senior ===
James was called up to the senior team for the first time in May 2014 for friendlies against Bulgaria and Moldova in Austria on May 23 and 27, respectively. James received his second call up to the national team for a January 2015 camp and friendlies against Iceland. He made his debut for Canada as a starter in the first of the two friendlies on January 16, 2015. James became cap-tied to Canada on June 11, 2015, against his native Dominica. Prior to the match, James received harassment from Dominica fans. James scored his first goal for Canada against Honduras in San Pedro Sula on September 2, 2016.

== Personal life ==
James has been married. He has a son.

== Career statistics ==
=== Club ===
As of October 28, 2023

Appearances and goals by club, season and competition
Club	Season	League			Cup		Continental		Playoffs		Total	
Club	Season	Division	Apps	Goals	Apps	Goals	Apps	Goals	Apps	Goals	Apps	Goals
Pécsi MFC	2013–14	Nemzeti Bajnokság I	0	0	2	0	0	0	-		2	0
Pécsi MFC	2014–15	Nemzeti Bajnokság I	16	0	8	0	0	0	-		24	0
Pécsi MFC	Total		16	0	10	0	0	0	0	0	26	0
Diósgyőri VTK	2015–16	Nemzeti Bajnokság I	17	0	0	0	0	0	-		17	0
Vasas	2016–17	Nemzeti Bajnokság I	11	0	4	1	0	0	-		15	1
Vasas	2017–18	Nemzeti Bajnokság I	28	2	0	0	0	0	-		28	2
Vasas	Total		39	2	4	1	0	0	0	0	43	3
FC Midtjylland	2018–19	Danish Superliga	5	0	1	0	0	0	-		6	0
FC Midtjylland	2019–20	Danish Superliga	5	0	1	0	0	0	-		6	0
FC Midtjylland	2020–21	Danish Superliga	4	0	1	0	1	0	-		6	0
FC Midtjylland	Total		14	0	3	0	1	0	0	0	18	0
FC Fredericia (loan)	2018–19	1st Division	17	1	3	0	0	0	-		20	1
Lamia (loan)	2020–21	Super League Greece	7	0	2	1	0	0	-		9	1
Vejle	2021–22	Danish Superliga	13	0	3	0	0	0	-		16	0
Chornomorets Odesa (loan)	2021–22	Ukrainian Premier League	0	0	0	0	0	0	-		0	0
Chornomorets Odesa	2022–23	Ukrainian Premier League	13	1	0	0	0	0	-		13	1
Forge FC	2023	Canadian Premier League	26	0	3	0	0	0	2	0	31	0
Career total			136	4	25	2	1	0	2	0	164	6

=== International ===
As of match played January 7, 2020

Appearances and goals by national team and year
National team	Year	Apps	Goals
Canada	2015	3	0
Canada	2016	6	1
Canada	2017	5	1
Canada	2018	2	0
Canada	2019	0	0
Canada	2020	1	0
Total		17	2

As of match played June 13, 2017
Scores and results list Canada's goal tally first, score column indicates score after each James goal.

List of international goals scored by Manjrekar James
No.	Date	Venue	Cap	Opponent	Score	Result	Competition
1	September 2, 2016	Estadio Olímpico Metropolitano, San Pedro Sula, Honduras	6	Honduras	1–0	1–2	2018 FIFA World Cup qualification
2	June 13, 2017	Saputo Stadium, Montreal, Canada	11	Curaçao	1–1	2–1	Friendly

== Honours ==
Forge FC

- Canadian Premier League: 2023
- Canadian Championship: 2026
