= Péter Beke =

Péter Beke may refer to:

- Péter Beke (footballer, born 1994), Hungarian footballer
- Péter Beke (footballer, born 2001), Hungarian footballer
