= Miroszláv Zsdrál =

Hungarian footballer

Personal information
- Full name: Miroszláv Zsdrál
- Date of birth: 18 January 1991 (age 35)
- Place of birth: Pécs, Hungary
- Height: 1.80 m (5 ft 11 in)
- Position: Midfielder

Team information
- Current team: Pécs
- Number: 11

Youth career
- 2002–2009: Pécs

Senior career*
Years	Team	Apps	(Gls)
2009–	Pécs	12	(0)
2012–2014	→ Kozármisleny (loan)	37	(7)
- * Club domestic league appearances and goals as of 1 June 2014

Miroszláv Zsdrál (born 18 January 1991) is a Hungarian football player who currently plays for Pécsi Mecsek FC.

== Career statistics ==
Appearances and goals by club, season and competition
Club	Season	League			Cup		League Cup		Europe		Total	
Club	Season	Division	Apps	Goals	Apps	Goals	Apps	Goals	Apps	Goals	Apps	Goals
Pécs
Pécs	2009–10	Nemzeti Bajnokság II	1	0	0	0	0	0	0	0	1	0
Pécs	2010–11	Nemzeti Bajnokság II	4	0	0	0	0	0	0	0	4	0
Pécs	2011–12	Nemzeti Bajnokság I	0	0	0	0	2	0	0	0	2	0
Pécs	2013–14	Nemzeti Bajnokság I	7	0	1	0	3	0	0	0	11	0
Pécs	Total		12	0	1	0	5	0	0	0	18	0
Kozármisleny
Kozármisleny	2011–12	Nemzeti Bajnokság II	5	1	0	0	0	0	0	0	5	1
Kozármisleny	2012–13	Nemzeti Bajnokság II	26	6	1	0	0	0	0	0	27	6
Kozármisleny	2013–14	Nemzeti Bajnokság II	6	0	1	0	3	0	0	0	10	0
Kozármisleny	Total		37	7	2	0	3	0	0	0	42	7
Career total			49	7	3	0	8	0	0	0	60	7

Updated to games played as of 1 June 2014.
