= Gergő Gőcze =

Hungarian footballer

Personal information
- Full name: Gergő Gőcze
- Date of birth: 30 April 1990 (age 36)
- Place of birth: Szombathely, Hungary
- Height: 1.87 m (6 ft 2 in)
- Position: Goalkeeper

Team information
- Current team: Sárvár

Youth career
- 2003–2004: Celldömölk
- 2004–2008: Haladás

Senior career*
Years	Team	Apps	(Gls)
2008–2013	Haladás	4	(0)
2010–2011	→ Kozármisleny (loan)	30	(0)
2013–2015	Pécs	31	(0)
2015–2016	Ajka	18	(0)
2016–2017	Puskás	5	(0)
2017	Kaposvár	12	(0)
2017–2019	Pécsi	16	(0)
2019	SV Neuberg		
2019–	Sárvár	11	(0)

International career
2010–2011	Hungary U-21	0	(0)
- * Club domestic league appearances and goals as of 23:17, 26 December 2019 (UTC)

Gergő Gőcze (born 30 April 1990, in Szombathely) is a Hungarian football player who currently plays for Sárvári FC.

== Career statistics ==
Appearances and goals by club, season and competition
Club	Season	League			Cup		League Cup		Europe		Total	
Club	Season	Division	Apps	Goals	Apps	Goals	Apps	Goals	Apps	Goals	Apps	Goals
Haladás
Haladás	2008–09	Nemzeti Bajnokság I	0	0	0	0	1	0	0	0	1	0
Haladás	2009–10	Nemzeti Bajnokság I	0	0	0	0	0	0	0	0	0	0
Haladás	2010–11	Nemzeti Bajnokság I	0	0	0	0	0	0	0	0	0	0
Haladás	2011–12	Nemzeti Bajnokság I	2	0	2	0	3	0	0	0	7	0
Haladás	2012–13	Nemzeti Bajnokság I	2	0	1	0	1	0	0	0	4	0
Haladás	Total		4	0	3	0	5	0	0	0	12	0
Kozármisleny	2010–11	Nemzeti Bajnokság II	30	0	0	0	0	0	0	0	30	0
Pécs
Pécs	2013–14	Nemzeti Bajnokság I	21	0	4	0	2	0	0	0	27	0
Pécs	2014–15	Nemzeti Bajnokság I	10	0	3	0	5	0	0	0	18	0
Pécs	Total		31	0	7	0	7	0	0	0	45	0
Ajka	2015–16	Nemzeti Bajnokság I	12	0	0	0	0	0	0	0	12	0
Career total			77	0	10	0	12	0	0	0	99	0

Updated to games played as of 22 January 2016.
