= Danijel Romić =

Croatian footballer (born 1993)

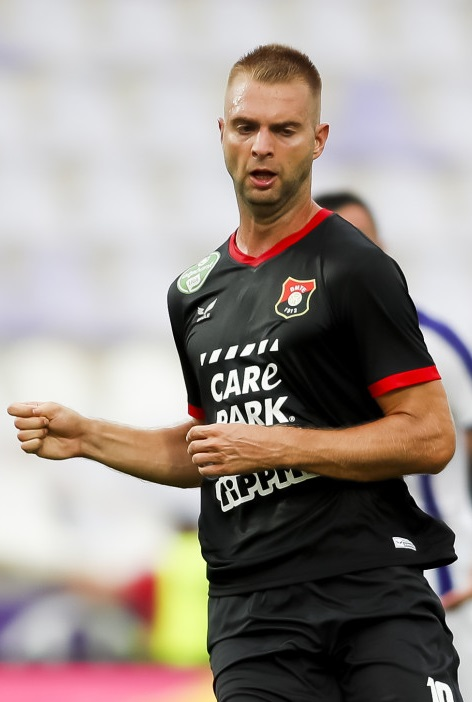
- Romić playing for Budafok in 2020

Personal information
- Date of birth: 19 March 1993 (age 33)
- Place of birth: Subotica, FR Yugoslavia
- Height: 1.87 m (6 ft 1 1/2 in)
- Position: Centre back

Team information
- Current team: FC Purkersdorf

Youth career
- –2007: Bačka 1901
- 2007–2008: Spartak Subotica
- 2008–2012: Cibalia

Senior career*
Years	Team	Apps	(Gls)
2012–2013	Kozármisleny	18	(2)
2013–2015	Pécs	42	(2)
2015–2016	Vasas	4	(0)
2016–2017	Hapoel Katamon	4	(0)
2017	Cibalia	7	(0)
2017–2018	Soroksár	0	(0)
2018–2019	Pécs	24	(2)
2019–2021	Budafok	44	(2)
2021–2022	Haladás	5	(0)
2022–2023	Budafok	10	(0)
2023–	FC Purkersdorf		
- * Club domestic league appearances and goals as of 9 December 2022

Danijel Romić (born 19 March 1993) is a Croatian football player who plays for Austrian club FC Purkersdorf.

== Club career ==
On 8 February 2023, Romić joined FC Purkersdorf in Austrian lower leagues.

== Club statistics ==
Club	Season	League		Cup		League Cup		Europe		Total	
Club	Season	Apps	Goals	Apps	Goals	Apps	Goals	Apps	Goals	Apps	Goals
Kozármisleny
Kozármisleny	2012–13	18	2	0	0	–	–	–	–	18	2
Kozármisleny	Total	18	2	0	0	0	0	0	0	18	2
Pécs
Pécs	2013–14	28	2	4	0	1	0	–	–	33	2
Pécs	2014–15	14	0	4	1	6	1	–	–	24	2
Pécs	2018–19	24	2	0	0	–	–	–	–	24	2
Pécs	Total	66	4	8	1	7	1	0	0	81	6
Vasas
Vasas	2015–16	4	0	0	0	–	–	–	–	4	0
Vasas	Total	4	0	0	0	0	0	0	0	4	0
Hapoel Katamon
Hapoel Katamon	2016–17	4	0	0	0	–	–	–	–	4	0
Hapoel Katamon	Total	4	0	0	0	0	0	0	0	4	0
Cibalia
Cibalia	2016–17	7	0	0	0	–	–	–	–	7	0
Cibalia	Total	7	0	0	0	0	0	0	0	7	0
Soroksár
Soroksár	2017–18	0	0	1	0	–	–	–	–	1	0
Soroksár	Total	0	0	1	0	0	0	0	0	1	0
Budafok
Budafok	2019–20	25	2	3	1	–	–	–	–	28	3
Budafok	2020–21	19	0	4	1	–	–	–	–	23	1
Budafok	Total	44	2	7	2	0	0	0	0	51	4
Career Total		143	8	16	3	7	1	0	0	166	12

Updated to games played as of 15 May 2021.
