= Viktor Városi =

Hungarian footballer

Personal information
- Full name: Viktor Városi
- Date of birth: 21 October 1993 (age 33)
- Place of birth: Pécs, Hungary
- Height: 1.84 m (6 ft 1/2 in)
- Position: Midfielder

Team information
- Current team: Kozármisleny SE
- Number: 9

Youth career
- 2004–2008: Pécs
- 2008–2011: Burgenland
- 2011–2012: Draßburg

Senior career*
Years	Team	Apps	(Gls)
2012–2014	Pécs	14	(0)
2012–2013	→ Kozármisleny (loan)	24	(4)
2014–2015	Haladás	7	(0)
2015–2016	ZTE	42	(8)
2016–	Kozármisleny SE	4	(1)
- * Club domestic league appearances and goals as of 26 September 2016

Viktor Városi (born 21 October 1993) is a Hungarian football player who currently plays for Kozármisleny SE.

== Career statistics ==
Appearances and goals by club, season and competition
Club	Season	League			Cup		League Cup		Europe		Total	
Club	Season	Division	Apps	Goals	Apps	Goals	Apps	Goals	Apps	Goals	Apps	Goals
Kozármisleny	2012–13	Nemzeti Bajnokság II	24	4	1	0	0	0	0	0	25	4
Pécs	2013–14	Nemzeti Bajnokság I	14	0	1	0	9	1	0	0	24	1
Haladás	2014–15	Nemzeti Bajnokság I	4	0	2	0	4	1	0	0	10	1
Career total			42	4	4	0	13	2	0	0	59	6

Updated to games played as of 26 October 2014.
