= Ferenc Rácz =

Hungarian footballer (born 1991)

Personal information
- Date of birth: 28 March 1991 (age 35)
- Place of birth: Szombathely, Hungary
- Height: 1.78 m (5 ft 10 in)
- Position: Striker

Team information
- Current team: Dorog
- Number: 21

Youth career
- 2003–2008: Haladás

Senior career*
Years	Team	Apps	(Gls)
2008–2011	Haladás	13	(1)
2011	→ Ajka (loan)	8	(1)
2011–2012	Kozármisleny	28	(9)
2012–2015	MTK	6	(0)
2013–2015	→ Pécs (loan)	29	(2)
2015–2017	Mezőkövesd	22	(2)
2016–2017	→ Győr (loan)	19	(4)
2017–2018	Balmazújváros	18	(4)
2018	Kisvárda	0	(0)
2019	Kozármisleny	12	(0)
2020–2022	Haladás	32	(4)
2022–	Dorog	23	(1)

International career
2008–2010	Hungary U-19	3	(0)
- * Club domestic league appearances and goals as of 21:02, 30 May 2023 (UTC)

Ferenc Rácz (born 28 March 1991) is a Hungarian football player who plays for Dorog.

Starting his senior career in Haladás, he was loaned out to gain experience.

== Career statistics ==
Appearances and goals by club, season and competition
Club	Season	League			Cup		League Cup		Europe		Total	
Club	Season	Division	Apps	Goals	Apps	Goals	Apps	Goals	Apps	Goals	Apps	Goals
Haladás
Haladás	2008–09	Nemzeti Bajnokság I	4	0	0	0	6	1	—		10	1
Haladás	2009–10	Nemzeti Bajnokság I	5	1	1	0	5	0	—		11	1
Haladás	2010–11	Nemzeti Bajnokság I	4	0	2	1	2	1	—		8	2
Haladás	Total		13	1	3	1	13	2	0	0	29	4
Ajka	2010–11	Nemzeti Bajnokság II	8	1	0	0	—		—		8	1
Kozármisleny	2011–12	Nemzeti Bajnokság II	28	9	5	1	—		—		33	10
MTK Budapest	2012–13	Nemzeti Bajnokság I	6	0	1	0	5	0	2	0	14	0
Pécs
Pécs	2013–14	Nemzeti Bajnokság I	12	0	3	0	9	1	—		24	1
Pécs	2014–15	Nemzeti Bajnokság I	17	2	4	0	7	3	—		28	5
Pécs	Total		29	2	7	0	16	4	0	0	52	6
Mezőkövesd	2015–16	Nemzeti Bajnokság II	22	2	0	0	—		—		22	2
Győr	2016–17	Nemzeti Bajnokság III	19	4	3	1	—		—		22	5
Balmazújváros	2017–18	Nemzeti Bajnokság I	18	4	5	1	—		—		23	5
Career total			143	23	24	4	34	6	2	0	203	33

Updated to games played as of 31 March 2018.
