= Péter Beke (footballer, born 1994) =

Hungarian footballer

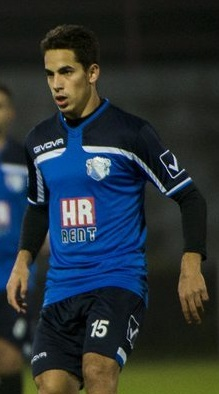
- Beke playing for Kozármisleny in 2015

Personal information
- Date of birth: 6 December 1994 (age 31)
- Place of birth: Pécs, Hungary
- Height: 1.75 m (5 ft 9 in)
- Position: Midfielder

Team information
- Current team: Pécs
- Number: 2

Youth career
- 2006–2009: Bonyhád
- 2009–2013: Pécs

Senior career*
Years	Team	Apps	(Gls)
2013–2015	Pécs	12	(0)
2013	Pécs II	1	(0)
2015–2017	Kozármisleny	69	(15)
2017–2018	Szeged	15	(1)
2018	Pécs	12	(0)
2018–2019	Kozármisleny	13	(3)
2019–2021	Dorog	35	(1)
2021–2025	Kozármisleny	97	(5)
2025–	Pécs	26	(6)
- * Club domestic league appearances and goals as of 23 November 2025

Péter Beke (born 6 December 1994) is a Hungarian professional footballer who plays as a midfielder for Nemzeti Bajnokság III club Pécs.

== Career statistics ==
As of match played 23 November 2025

Appearances and goals by club, season and competition
Club	Season	League			Magyar Kupa		Ligakupa		Other		Total	
Club	Season	Division	Apps	Goals	Apps	Goals	Apps	Goals	Apps	Goals	Apps	Goals
Pécs	2012–13	Nemzeti Bajnokság I	7	0	—		0	0	—		7	0
Pécs	2013–14	Nemzeti Bajnokság I	5	0	1	0	5	1	—		11	1
Pécs	2014–15	Nemzeti Bajnokság I	0	0	0	0	4	0	—		4	0
Pécs	Total		12	0	1	0	9	1	—		22	1
Pécs II	2012–13	Nemzeti Bajnokság III	1	0	—		—		—		1	0
Kozármisleny	2014–15	Nemzeti Bajnokság III	14	3	—		—		—		14	3
Kozármisleny	2015–16	Nemzeti Bajnokság III	27	8	7	3	—		—		34	11
Kozármisleny	2016–17	Nemzeti Bajnokság II	28	4	3	0	—		—		31	4
Kozármisleny	Total		69	15	10	3	—		—		79	18
Szeged	2017–18	Nemzeti Bajnokság II	15	1	1	0	—		—		16	1
Pécs	2017–18	Nemzeti Bajnokság III	12	0	—		—		—		12	0
Kozármisleny	2018–19	Nemzeti Bajnokság III	13	3	1	0	—		—		14	3
Dorog	2018–19	Nemzeti Bajnokság II	15	1	—		—		—		15	1
Dorog	2019–20	Nemzeti Bajnokság II	11	0	7	1	—		—		18	1
Dorog	2020–21	Nemzeti Bajnokság II	9	0	1	0	—		—		10	0
Dorog	Total		35	1	8	1	—		—		43	2
Kozármisleny	2021–22	Nemzeti Bajnokság III	26	3	1	0	—		—		27	3
Kozármisleny	2022–23	Nemzeti Bajnokság II	33	2	1	0	—		2 (Note: Appearances in Nemzeti Bajnokság II relegation play-offs)	0	36	2
Kozármisleny	2023–24	Nemzeti Bajnokság II	27	0	3	0	—		—		30	0
Kozármisleny	2024–25	Nemzeti Bajnokság II	11	0	1	0	—		—		12	0
Kozármisleny	Total		97	5	6	0	—		2	0	105	5
Pécs	2024–25	Nemzeti Bajnokság III	9	1	—		—		—		9	1
Pécs	2025–26	Nemzeti Bajnokság III	17	5	3	0	—		—		20	5
Pécs	Total		26	6	3	0	—		—		29	6
Career total			280	31	30	4	9	1	2	0	321	36
