= Levente Lantos =

Hungarian footballer

Personal information
- Date of birth: 26 July 1980 (age 46)
- Place of birth: Pécs, Hungary
- Height: 1.84 m (6 ft 1/2 in)
- Position: Midfielder

Senior career*
Years	Team	Apps	(Gls)
1998–2003	Pécs		
2003–2004	Komló		
2004–2015	Pécs	182	(5)
2015–2019	Kozármisleny	96	(6)
- * Club domestic league appearances and goals

Levente Lantos (born 26 July 1980) is a Hungarian former football player.

== Career statistics ==
Appearances and goals by club, season and competition
Club	Season	League		Cup		League Cup		Europe		Total	
Club	Season	Apps	Goals	Apps	Goals	Apps	Goals	Apps	Goals	Apps	Goals
Pécs
Pécs	1998–99	28	1	0	0	0	0	0	0	28	1
Pécs	1999–00	9	1	0	0	0	0	0	0	9	1
Pécs	2000–01	0	0	0	0	0	0	0	0	0	0
Pécs	2001–02	0	0	0	0	0	0	0	0	0	0
Pécs	2002–03	9	0	1	0	0	0	0	0	10	0
Pécs	2003–04	9	0	0	0	0	0	0	0	9	0
Pécs	2004–05	25	2	1	0	0	0	0	0	26	2
Pécs	2005–06	12	0	0	0	0	0	0	0	12	0
Pécs	2006–07	25	1	1	0	0	0	0	0	26	1
Pécs	2007–08	28	0	0	0	0	0	0	0	28	10
Pécs	2008–09	27	2	2	0	13	0	0	0	42	2
Pécs	2009–10	26	1	3	0	0	0	0	0	29	1
Pécs	2010–11	21	1	2	1	0	0	0	0	23	2
Pécs	2011–12	28	0	3	1	3	0	0	0	34	1
Pécs	2012–13	12	0	2	0	5	1	0	0	19	1
Pécs	2013–14	4	0	1	0	8	1	0	0	13	1
Pécs	2014–15	2	0	1	1	4	0	0	0	7	1
Pécs	Total	265	9	17	3	33	2	0	0	316	14
Career total		265	9	17	3	33	2	0	0	316	14

Updated to games played as of 28 November 2014.
