= Ferenc Fodor =

Hungarian football player

Personal information
- Date of birth: 22 March 1991 (age 35)
- Place of birth: Pécs, Hungary
- Height: 1.90 m (6 ft 3 in)
- Position: Defender

Team information
- Current team: Tiszakécske
- Number: 15

Youth career
- 2002–2006: Pécs
- 2006–2010: MTK

Senior career*
Years	Team	Apps	(Gls)
2010–2011	Oldham	0	(0)
2010	→ Northwich (loan)		
2011–2014	Pécs	47	(1)
2011–2012	→ Kozármisleny (loan)	25	(3)
2014–2015	Nyíregyháza	23	(3)
2015–2016	Puskás	20	(1)
2016–2017	Kisvárda	35	(2)
2017–2021	Nyíregyháza	121	(6)
2021–2023	Győri ETO	62	(2)
2023–	Tiszakécske	17	(0)

International career
2010–2011	Hungary U-19	?	(0)
2011–2012	Hungary U-21	7	(0)
- * Club domestic league appearances and goals as of 21 December 2023

Ferenc Fodor (born 22 March 1991) is a Hungarian football player who plays for Tiszakécske.

== Club career ==
On 16 June 2021 Fodor signed a two-year contract with Győri ETO.

== Career statistics ==
Season	Club	Country	Competition	Matches	Goals
2010–11	Pécs	Hungary	NB2	11	0
2011–12	Kozármisleny	Hungary	NB2	25	3
2012–13	Pécs	Hungary	NB1	15	0
2013–14	Pécs	Hungary	NB1	21	1
2014–15	Nyíregyháza	Hungary	NB1	13	0
			Total	86	4
