= Róbert Kővári =

Hungarian footballer

Personal information
- Date of birth: 23 November 1995 (age 30)
- Place of birth: Szekszárd, Hungary
- Height: 1.80 m (5 ft 11 in)
- Position: Midfielder

Team information
- Current team: Békéscsaba
- Number: 77

Youth career
- 2002–2010: Szekszárd
- 2010–2013: Pécs

Senior career*
Years	Team	Apps	(Gls)
2013–2015	Pécs	39	(6)
2015–2021	Paks	28	(0)
2016–2017	→ Dorog (loan)	29	(2)
2017–2018	→ Sopron (loan)	19	(1)
2019–2020	→ Siófok (loan)	9	(0)
2021–2024	Szeged-Csanád	92	(4)
2024–	Békéscsaba	19	(1)

International career
2014	Hungary U-19	2	(0)
2014	Hungary U-20	3	(0)
- * Club domestic league appearances and goals as of 20 January 2026

Róbert Kővári (born 23 November 1995) is a Hungarian football player who plays for Békéscsaba.

== Career statistics ==
Appearances and goals by club, season and competition
Club	Season	League		Cup		League Cup		Europe		Total	
Club	Season	Apps	Goals	Apps	Goals	Apps	Goals	Apps	Goals	Apps	Goals
Pécs
Pécs	2012–13	1	0	0	0	0	0	0	0	1	0
Pécs	2013–14	17	4	3	0	7	0	0	0	27	4
Pécs	2014–15	21	2	6	2	6	0	0	0	35	4
Pécs	Total	39	6	9	2	13	0	0	0	61	8
Paks
Paks	2015–16	10	0	3	0	–	–	–	–	13	0
Paks	2016–17	1	0	0	0	–	–	–	–	1	0
Paks	2018–19	16	0	4	0	–	–	–	–	20	0
Paks	2019–20	1	0	0	0	–	–	–	–	1	0
Paks	Total	28	0	7	0	0	0	0	0	35	0
Dorog
Dorog	2016–17	29	2	1	0	–	–	–	–	30	2
Dorog	Total	29	2	1	0	0	0	0	0	30	2
Sopron
Sopron	2017–18	19	1	0	0	–	–	–	–	19	1
Sopron	Total	19	1	0	0	0	0	0	0	19	1
Career total		115	9	17	2	13	0	0	0	145	11

Updated to games played as of 1 September 2019.
