= Andrej Čaušić =

Croatian footballer

Personal information
- Full name: Andrej Čaušić
- Date of birth: 19 February 1990 (age 36)
- Place of birth: Osijek, Croatia
- Height: 1.85 m (6 ft 1 in)
- Position: Centre back

Team information
- Current team: NK Vardarac

Youth career
- 2000–2004: Valpovka
- 2004–2008: Osijek

Senior career*
Years	Team	Apps	(Gls)
2009–2011	Osijek	19	(0)
2009	→ Olimpija Osijek (loan)		
2011–2013	Pécs	33	(3)
2013–2014	DAC Dunajská Streda	12	(2)
2014–2015	Pécs	16	(0)
2016–2017	Kozármisleny	22	(0)
2017	Szeged 2011	16	(0)
2018–2020	Vihor Jelisavac	5	(0)
2021-	NK Vardarac		
- * Club domestic league appearances and goals as of 12 October 2018

Andrej Čaušić (born 19 February 1990) is a Croatian football defender who currently plays for NK Vardarac.
