= Dávid Mohl =

Hungarian footballer

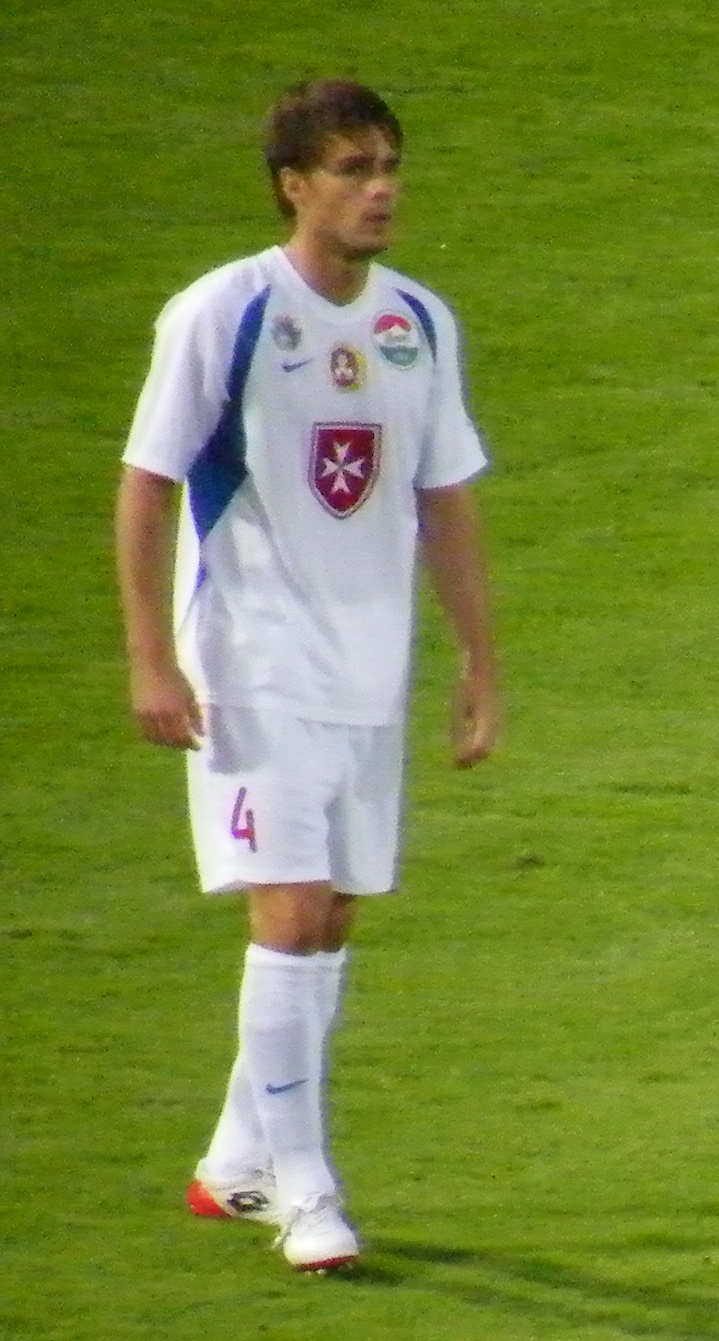

Personal information
- Date of birth: 22 April 1985 (age 41)
- Place of birth: Székesfehérvár, Hungary
- Height: 1.75 m (5 ft 9 in)
- Position: Left back

Team information
- Current team: Fehérvár II

Youth career
- Ferencváros

Senior career*
| Years | Team | Apps | (Gls) |
| 2004–2006 | Admira Wacker | 10 | (1) |
| 2004–2006 | → Admira Wacker II | 29 | (2) |
| 2006–2009 | Videoton | 74 | (2) |
| 2009–2011 | Debrecen | 1 | (0) |
| 2010–2011 | → Kecskemét (loan) | 22 | (1) |
| 2011–2013 | Kecskemét | 43 | (6) |
| 2012 | → Debrecen (loan) | 0 | (0) |
| 2013–2015 | Pécs | 40 | (6) |
| 2015–2019 | Újpest | 86 | (2) |
| 2019 | Haladás | 7 | (0) |
| 2019–2022 | Szeged-Csanád | 61 | (1) |
| 2022– | Fehérvár II | 8 | (0) |

International career
| 1999–2000 | Hungary U-14 | 4 | (0) |
- * Club domestic league appearances and goals as of 4 May 2022

Dávid Mohl (Hungarian pronunciation: [ˈdaːvid ˈmol]; born 22 April 1985) is a Hungarian footballer who plays as a left back for Fehérvár II.

== Career statistics ==
Appearances and goals by club, season and competition
| Club | Season | League | | | Cup | | League Cup | | Europe | | Total | |
| Club | Season | Division | Apps | Goals | Apps | Goals | Apps | Goals | Apps | Goals | Apps | Goals |
|---|---|---|---|---|---|---|---|---|---|---|---|---|
| Videoton | 2006–07 | Nemzeti Bajnokság I | 24 | 2 | 1 | 0 | 0 | 0 | 0 | 0 | 25 | 2 |
| Videoton | 2007–08 | Nemzeti Bajnokság I | 28 | 0 | 4 | 0 | 13 | 0 | 0 | 0 | 45 | 0 |
| Videoton | 2008–09 | Nemzeti Bajnokság I | 20 | 0 | 3 | 0 | 9 | 1 | 0 | 0 | 32 | 1 |
| Videoton | Total | | 72 | 2 | 8 | 0 | 22 | 1 | 0 | 0 | 102 | 3 |
| Debrecen | 2009–10 | Nemzeti Bajnokság I | 1 | 0 | 0 | 0 | 0 | 0 | 0 | 0 | 1 | 0 |
| Debrecen | 2012–13 | Nemzeti Bajnokság I | 0 | 0 | 0 | 0 | 0 | 0 | 2 | 0 | 2 | 0 |
| Debrecen | Total | | 1 | 0 | 0 | 0 | 0 | 0 | 2 | 0 | 3 | 0 |
| Kecskemét | 2010–11 | Nemzeti Bajnokság I | 22 | 1 | 7 | 0 | 2 | 0 | 0 | 0 | 31 | 1 |
| Kecskemét | 2011–12 | Nemzeti Bajnokság I | 24 | 1 | 1 | 1 | 8 | 1 | 2 | 0 | 35 | 3 |
| Kecskemét | 2012–13 | Nemzeti Bajnokság I | 19 | 5 | 0 | 0 | 4 | 0 | 0 | 0 | 23 | 5 |
| Kecskemét | Total | | 65 | 7 | 8 | 1 | 14 | 1 | 2 | 0 | 89 | 9 |
| Pécs | 2013–14 | Nemzeti Bajnokság I | 26 | 4 | 4 | 1 | 4 | 1 | 0 | 0 | 34 | 6 |
| Pécs | 2014–15 | Nemzeti Bajnokság I | 14 | 2 | 3 | 1 | 4 | 1 | 0 | 0 | 21 | 4 |
| Pécs | Total | | 40 | 6 | 7 | 2 | 8 | 2 | 0 | 0 | 55 | 10 |
| Újpest | 2015–16 | Nemzeti Bajnokság I | 30 | 1 | 6 | 2 | 0 | 0 | 0 | 0 | 36 | 3 |
| Újpest | 2016–17 | Nemzeti Bajnokság I | 32 | 1 | 6 | 1 | 0 | 0 | 0 | 0 | 38 | 2 |
| Újpest | 2017–18 | Nemzeti Bajnokság I | 21 | 0 | 4 | 0 | 0 | 0 | 0 | 0 | 25 | 0 |
| Újpest | 2018–19 | Nemzeti Bajnokság I | 3 | 0 | 0 | 0 | 0 | 0 | 0 | 0 | 3 | 0 |
| Újpest | Total | | 86 | 2 | 16 | 3 | 0 | 0 | 0 | 0 | 102 | 5 |
| Haladás | 2018–19 | Nemzeti Bajnokság I | 7 | 0 | 1 | 0 | 0 | 0 | 0 | 0 | 8 | 0 |
| Career total | | | 271 | 17 | 40 | 6 | 44 | 4 | 4 | 0 | 239 | 27 |

Updated to games played as of 19 May 2019.
