= Dávid Márkvárt =

Hungarian footballer (born 1994)

- Márkvárt playing for Szeged in 2026

Personal information
- Date of birth: 20 September 1994 (age 32)
- Place of birth: Szekszárd, Hungary
- Height: 1.78 m (5 ft 10 in)
- Position: Midfielder

Team information
- Current team: Szeged
- Number: 88

Youth career
- 2002–2009: Szekszárd

Senior career*
Years	Team	Apps	(Gls)
2013–2015	Pécs	65	(6)
2015–2018	Puskás Akadémia	95	(8)
2018–2021	Diósgyőr	85	(4)
2021–2023	Vasas	48	(0)
2023–	Szeged	83	(2)

International career^{‡}
2014	Hungary U20	1	(1)
2014–2015	Hungary U21	7	(1)
2017–	Hungary	3	(0)
- * Club domestic league appearances and goals as of 31 May 2026 ‡ National team caps and goals as of 2 May 2022

Dávid Márkvárt (born 20 September 1994) is a Hungarian professional footballer who plays as a midfielder for Nemzeti Bajnokság II club Szeged.

== Club career ==
On 21 June 2021, Márkvárt signed with Vasas.

== Career statistics ==
Appearances and goals by club, season and competition
Club	Season	League			Cup		League Cup		Europe		Total	
Club	Season	Division	Apps	Goals	Apps	Goals	Apps	Goals	Apps	Goals	Apps	Goals
Pécs
Pécs	2012–13	Nemzeti Bajnokság I	7	1	0	0	6	0	—		13	1
Pécs	2013–14	Nemzeti Bajnokság I	29	2	4	0	5	0	—		38	2
Pécs	2014–15	Nemzeti Bajnokság I	29	3	3	1	3	1	—		35	5
Pécs	Total		65	6	7	1	14	1	—		86	8
Puskás Akadémia
Puskás Akadémia	2015–16	Nemzeti Bajnokság I	31	3	1	0	—		—		32	3
Puskás Akadémia	2016–17	Nemzeti Bajnokság II	35	4	2	0	—		—		37	4
Puskás Akadémia	2017–18	Nemzeti Bajnokság I	25	1	5	0	—		—		30	1
Puskás Akadémia	2018–19	Nemzeti Bajnokság I	4	0	0	0	—		—		4	0
Puskás Akadémia	Total		95	8	8	0	—		—		103	8
Diósgyőr
Diósgyőr	2018–19	Nemzeti Bajnokság I	24	2	3	0	—		—		27	2
Diósgyőr	2019–20	Nemzeti Bajnokság I	31	2	3	0	—		—		34	2
Diósgyőr	2020–21	Nemzeti Bajnokság I	30	0	3	0	—		—		33	0
Diósgyőr	Total		85	4	9	0	—		—		94	4
Career total			245	18	24	1	14	1	0	0	283	20

Updated to games played as of 20 May 2021.
