= József Nagy (footballer, born 1988) =

Hungarian footballer

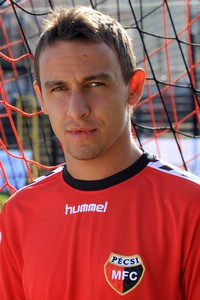

Personal information
- Date of birth: 1 January 1988 (age 38)
- Place of birth: Szolnok, Hungary
- Height: 1.79 m (5 ft 10 in)
- Position: Defender

Team information
- Current team: BVSC-Zugló
- Number: 5

Youth career
- 2003: Újpest
- 2003–2006: Ferencváros

Senior career*
| Years | Team | Apps | (Gls) |
| 2006–2008 | Ferencváros | 13 | (0) |
| 2008 | → Kozármisleny (loan) | 15 | (1) |
| 2008–2009 | Kecskemét | 0 | (0) |
| 2009–2015 | Pécs | 100 | (1) |
| 2012–2013 | → Kozármisleny (loan) | 26 | (2) |
| 2015–2016 | Mezőkövesd | 11 | (0) |
| 2016–2017 | Győri ETO | 28 | (0) |
| 2017–2018 | Pécs | 29 | (1) |
| 2018–2019 | Nyíregyháza | 22 | (1) |
| 2019–2021 | Rákosmente | 48 | (6) |
| 2021– | BVSC-Zugló | 73 | (5) |

International career
| 2004–2005 | Hungary U-17 | | |
| 2006–2007 | Hungary U-19 | | |
- * Club domestic league appearances and goals as of 21 December 2023

József Nagy (born 1 January 1988) is a Hungarian football player who plays for BVSC-Zugló.

His twin brother Sándor plays for Lombard-Pápa TFC.
