= Eke Uzoma =

Nigerian-Hungarian footballer

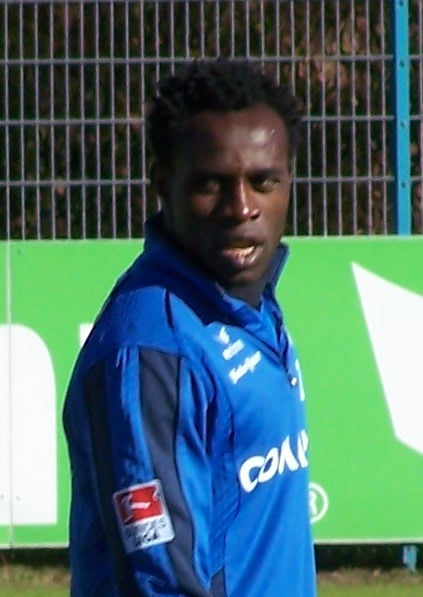
- Uzoma training with 1860 Munich in 2010

Personal information
- Date of birth: 11 August 1989 (age 37)
- Place of birth: Owerri, Nigeria
- Height: 1.68 m (5 ft 6 in)
- Position: Left-back

Team information
- Current team: BSV Rehden
- Number: 3

Youth career
- –2005: Eleme United
- 2005: Alemannia Mühlheim
- 2005–2007: SC Freiburg

Senior career*
Years	Team	Apps	(Gls)
2007–2010	SC Freiburg	54	(2)
2010	→ 1860 Munich (loan)	6	(0)
2010–2012	1860 Munich	2	(0)
2011	→ Arminia Bielefeld (loan)	10	(0)
2012–2013	Pécs	43	(1)
2014	SV Sandhausen	1	(0)
2014–2015	Pécs	21	(1)
2015	Spartak Subotica	10	(0)
2016	Chemnitzer FC	10	(0)
2016–2017	Berliner AK 07	31	(0)
2017–2018	Balmazújváros	33	(0)
2018–2021	Budapest Honvéd	48	(2)
2021–2022	Tiszakécske FC	29	(0)
2022–2023	Tennis Borussia Berlin	15	(2)
2023–2024	Viktoria Berlin	26	(0)
2024–2025	Tennis Borussia Berlin	3	(0)
2025	Hilalspor Berlin	9	(0)
2025–	BSV Rehden	7	(0)
- * Club domestic league appearances and goals as of 29 November 2025

Eke Uzoma // (born 11 August 1989) is a Nigerian-Hungarian professional footballer who plays as a left-back for German Oberliga Niedersachsen club BSV Rehden.

== Career ==
Uzoma was born in Owerri, Imo State, Nigeria. He began his professional career with SC Freiburg. His first real impact in the German football world came when he scored a goal against 1. FC Köln on 26 September 2007, in only his fourth match. This goal was voted goal of the week on German football show Sportschau and was nominated for goal of the month. In 2009, he helped SC Freiburg earn promotion to the Bundesliga. On 24 October 2009, he made his first appearance in the Bundesliga for Freiburg and became the 5,000th player in the history of the Bundesliga.

On 1 January 2010, he was loaned to 1860 Munich and he transferred eventually to 1860 Munich in summer 2010.

After playing the first half of the 2015–16 season in the Serbian SuperLiga with FK Spartak Subotica, in the winter-break he returned to Germany, this time by signing with Chemnitzer FC.

Following a season with Hungarian club Tiszakécske FC in the Nemzeti Bajnokság II, Uzoma moved to Tennis Borussia Berlin of the Regionalliga Nordost.

== Honors ==
SC Freiburg

- 2. Bundesliga: 2008–09
