= Lóránd Szatmári =

Romanian-born Hungarian footballer

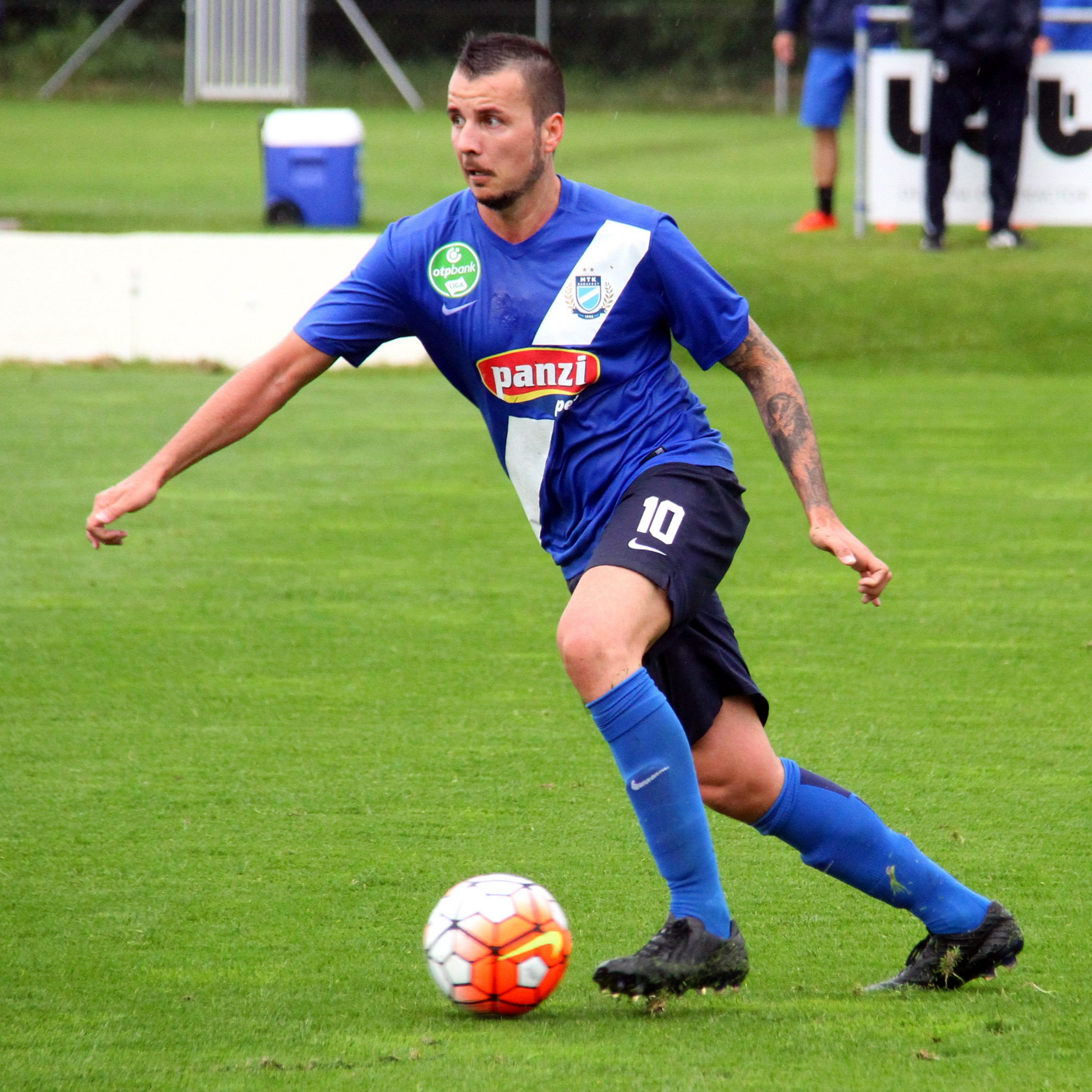

Personal information
- Date of birth: 3 October 1988 (age 38)
- Place of birth: Petroşani, Romania
- Height: 1.81 m (5 ft 11 1/2 in)
- Position: Midfielder

Senior career*
| Years | Team | Apps | (Gls) |
| 2005–2007 | Pécs | 23 | (0) |
| 2007–2012 | Reggina | 1 | (0) |
| 2008 | → Avellino (loan) | 3 | (1) |
| 2009 | → Monopoli (loan) | 11 | (0) |
| 2009–2010 | → MTK (loan) | 25 | (6) |
| 2010–2011 | → Salernitana (loan) | 24 | (1) |
| 2011–2012 | → Paks (loan) | 23 | (4) |
| 2012–2015 | Pécs | 76 | (7) |
| 2015–2017 | MTK | 14 | (1) |
| 2016 | → Mezőkövesd (loan) | 15 | (1) |
| 2017 | Puskás Akadémia | 16 | (2) |
| 2017–2018 | Győr | 34 | (3) |
| 2018–2022 | Vasas | 95 | (14) |
| 2022–2023 | Szeged-Csanád | 27 | (0) |

International career
| 2007–2010 | Hungary U-21 | 6 | (0) |
- * Club domestic league appearances and goals as of 30 May 2023

Lóránd Szatmári (born 3 October 1988) is a Romanian-born Hungarian football player.

== Club career ==
On 29 July 2022, Szatmári signed with Szeged-Csanád.
