= Roland Frőhlich =

Hungarian footballer

Roland Fröhlich
Personal information
- Date of birth: 8 August 1988 (age 38)
- Place of birth: Dunaújváros, Hungary
- Height: 1.78 m (5 ft 10 in)
- Position: Forward

Team information
- Current team: BVSC-Zugló

Youth career
- 2002–2006: Dunaújváros
- 2006–2007: MTK

Senior career*
Years	Team	Apps	(Gls)
2007–2012	MTK	0	(0)
2007–2009	→ Dunaújváros (loan)	24	(2)
2009	→ Baja (loan)	12	(0)
2009–2010	→ Szekszárd (loan)	10	(3)
2010	→ Érd (loan)	13	(9)
2010–2011	→ Baja (loan)	26	(10)
2011–2012	→ Pécs (loan)	23	(2)
2012–2015	Pécs	72	(6)
2012–2013	→ Kozármisleny (loan)	13	(5)
2015–2016	Paks	6	(0)
2016–2017	Mezőkövesd	16	(3)
2017	→ Cegléd (loan)	10	(1)
2017–2020	Soroksár	21	(5)
2020	Bicske	2	(0)
2020–2021	Szentlőrinc	30	(3)
2021–	BVSC	22	(6)
- * Club domestic league appearances and goals as of 8 May 2022

Roland Frőhlich (born 8 August 1988) is a Hungarian football player who plays for BVSC-Zugló.
