= Péter Pölöskei =

Hungarian footballer

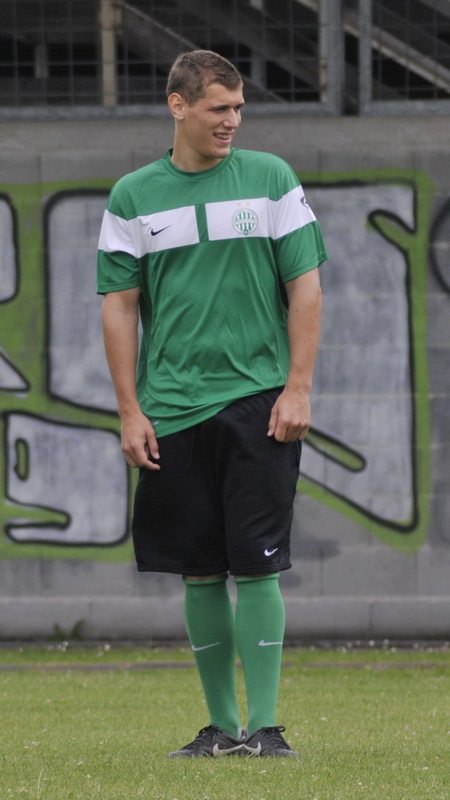

Personal information
- Date of birth: 11 August 1988 (age 38)
- Place of birth: Budapest, Hungary
- Height: 1.88 m (6 ft 2 in)
- Position: Striker

Youth career
- 2002–2003: MTK
- 2003–2005: Ferencváros
- 2005–2006: Rákospalota

Senior career*
Years	Team	Apps	(Gls)
2006–2007	BKV Előre	13	(2)
2007–2009	Szombathely	14	(1)
2008–2009	→ Ferencváros (loan)	12	(3)
2009–2012	Ferencváros	37	(9)
2010	→ Rákospalota (loan)	11	(8)
2012–2014	Debrecen	13	(2)
2013–2014	→ Pécs (loan)	16	(5)
2014–2015	Pécs	14	(2)
2015–2017	Nyíregyháza Spartacus	41	(22)
2017–2019	Budafok	66	(25)
2019	Soroksár SC	8	(0)
2020	Bicskei TC	2	(1)
- * Club domestic league appearances and goals as of 5 Aug 2020

Péter Pölöskei (born 11 August 1988, in Budapest) is a Hungarian football player.

== Career ==
After leaving Ferencvárosi TC, Poloskei joined Coventry City on trial during August 2012, where he played in Coventry's pre season. However, after considering offering Poloskei a one-year deal, Coventry decided not to offer Poloskei a full-time contract.

After his trial ended at Coventry, Poloskei joined Leeds United on trial in September 2012, and scored on his début for the club in Leeds Development Team's 3–1 victory over Wigan Athletic. His ex Ferencvárosi TC Manager Bobby Davison tipped Poloskei to be a hit at Leeds United should he get a permanent deal. He currently plays for Debreceni VSC

In August 2019, Pölöskei joined Soroksár SC. On 8 January 2020 the club announced, that he had left the club. Pölöskei had suffered from several injuries and only managed to play 10 games in total, scoring two goals for the club.
