= Krisztián Koller =

Hungarian footballer

Personal information
- Full name: Krisztián Koller
- Date of birth: 8 May 1983 (age 43)
- Place of birth: Pécs, Hungary
- Height: 1.83 m (6 ft 0 in)
- Position: Forward

Youth career
- 2002–2004: Komlói Bányász

Senior career*
Years	Team	Apps	(Gls)
2004–2009	Barcs	90	(27)
2009–2010	Kaposvölgye	20	(5)
2010–2011	Pécsi EAC	0	(0)
2010	→ Barcs (loan)	14	(1)
2011–2013	Kozármisleny	53	(14)
2013–2014	Pécs	31	(13)
2014–2020	Nyíregyháza	16	(2)
- * Club domestic league appearances and goals as of 30 November 2014

Krisztián Koller (born 8 May 1983 in Pécs) is a Hungarian former football player who last played for Nyíregyháza Spartacus FC. He spent several years at Barcs, scoring eight goals in the 2006–07 season. Koller played for Kaposvölgye in the 2009–10 season.
