= Stadion PMFC =

Football stadium in Pécs, Hungary

Coordinates: 46.0685°N 18.1959°E

Újmecsekaljai stadion
- Interactive map of Újmecsekaljai stadion
- Location: Pécs, Hungary
- Operator: Pécsi MFC
- Capacity: 7000
- Surface: Grass
- Field size: 105 x 68 m

Construction
- Opened: 1955

Tenants
- Pécsi MFC; Hungary national football team

Stadion PMFC is a UEFA Category 1 football stadium in Pécs, Hungary. It is currently used for football matches and is the home stadium of Pécsi MFC. The stadium is able to hold 7,000 people and was opened in 1955. The stadium used to be referred to as "PMSC stadion" due to the old name of the local team, and sometimes referred to as "Újmecsekaljai stadion", which is derived from the name of the district, where the stadium is located.

== History ==
The history of the stadium, as well as the history of the football club is closely related to uranium mining in Pécs. Due to the mining of this mineral, a whole new district was built in the western edge of the city in order to provide accommodation to the miner, and their families. This new part of the city is called Uranium City (Uránváros in Hungarian), and along with the apartments, theaters, sport complexes and parks were built, too. The building of a new football stadium was also part of this program.
