= 2013–14 Nemzeti Bajnokság I =

Nemzeti Bajnokság I
- Season: 2013–14
- Dates: 26 July 2013 – 1 June 2014
- Champions: Debrecen
- Relegated: Mezőkövesd; Kaposvár
- Champions League: Debrecen
- Europa League: Győr; Ferencváros; Diósgyőr (via Magyar Kupa)
- Matches: 240
- Goals: 641 (2.67 per match)
- Biggest home win: Debrecen 7–1 Kaposvár
- Biggest away win: Kecskemét 2–6 Mezőkövesd
- Highest scoring: Debrecen 7–1 Kaposvár; Kecskemét 2–6 Mezőkövesd
- Longest winning run: 8 games Ferencváros - in progress
- Longest unbeaten run: 15 games Debrecen
- Longest winless run: 18 games Paks
- Longest losing run: 8 games Budapest Honvéd

The 2013–14 Nemzeti Bajnokság I, also known as NB I, was the 112th season of top-tier football in Hungary. The league is officially named OTP Bank Liga for sponsorship reasons. The season began 26 July 2013 and concluded on 1 June 2014. Győr were the defending champions, having won their fourth Hungarian championship the previous season.

== Overview ==
The season was contested by 16 teams, and concluded with Debreceni VSC winning their seventh national title, and their second under Elemér Kondás.

DVSC suffered two defeats early on in the season, and found themselves 4 points behind Videoton FC by matchday 10, however, they managed to overtake their Western rivals, and went into the winter break with a 4 point lead over Videoton, and were undefeated between September and April.

A slip of form by Videoton during the spring allowed defending champions Győr to get close to DVSC, and by Matchday 25, the difference between Debrecen and Győ were just 3 points. Győr won nine of their last 10 games, and eventually caught-up with DVSC in points on the last gameday, after demolishing Mezőkövesd 5-0, but due to the eastern team's superior goal difference, Debrecen managed to secure the title on the last day of the season, despite succumbing to a 2-0 defeat at home to Budapest Honvéd.

== Teams ==
BFC Siófok and Egri FC finished the 2012–13 season in the last two places and thus were relegated to their respective NB II divisions.

The two relegated teams were replaced with the champions of the two 2012–13 NB II groups, Mezőkövesd SE of the East Group and Puskás Akadémia FC of the West Group. Each of the first two teams in the first division.

=== Stadium and locations ===
Location of teams in 2013–14 Nemzeti Bajnokság I

Following is the list of clubs competing in 2013–14 Nemzeti Bajnokság I, with their location, stadium and stadium capacity.

Team	Location	Stadium	Capacity
Budapest Honvéd	Budapest	Bozsik József Stadion	9,500
Debreceni VSC	Debrecen	Oláh Gábor utcai Stadion	10,200
Debreceni VSC	Debrecen	Nagyerdei Stadion	20,340
Diósgyőr	Miskolc	Diósgyőri Stadion	11,398
Ferencváros	Budapest	Albert Flórián Stadion	15,804
Győri ETO	Győr	ETO Park	15,600
Kaposvári Rákóczi	Kaposvár	Rákóczi Stadion	7,000
Kecskeméti TE	Kecskemét	Széktói Stadion	6,320
Lombard Pápa	Pápa	Perutz Stadion	5,500
Mezőkövesd-Zsóry	Mezőkövesd	Mezőkövesdi Városi Stadion	2,571
MTK Budapest	Budapest	Hidegkuti Nándor Stadion	7,515
Paksi FC	Paks	Fehérvári úti Stadion	4,400
Pécsi MFC	Pécs	PMFC Stadion	7,000
Puskás Akadémia FC	Felcsút	Pancho Aréna	3,000
Haladás	Szombathely	Rohonci úti Stadion	9,500
Újpest	Budapest	Szusza Ferenc Stadion	13,501
Videoton	Székesfehérvár	Sóstói Stadion	14,300

=== Personnel and kits ===
Following is the list of clubs competing in 2013–14 Nemzeti Bajnokság I, with their manager, captain, kit manufacturer and shirt sponsor.
Note: Flags indicate national team as has been defined under FIFA eligibility rules. Players and Managers may hold more than one non-FIFA nationality.

Team	Manager	Captain	Kit manufacturer	Shirt sponsors
Budapest Honvéd	(Italy) Marco Rossi	(Hungary) Szabolcs Kemenes	Givova	—
Debreceni VSC	(Hungary) Elemér Kondás	(Hungary) Péter Szakály	adidas	TEVA
Diósgyőr	(Serbia) Tomislav Sivić	(Hungary) Tamás Kádár	Nike	Borsodi
Ferencváros	(Germany) Thomas Doll	(Hungary) Gábor Gyömbér	Nike	Groupama
Győri ETO	(Hungary) Ferenc Horváth	(Hungary) Zoltán Lipták	Puma	Audi, Quaestor
Haladás	(Hungary) Tamás Artner	(Hungary) Péter Tóth	Legea	Sopron Bank, Contact Zrt.
Kaposvári Rákóczi	(Romania) Tibor Selymes	(Hungary) István Bank	TOTI	Ippon Energy
Kecskeméti TE	(Hungary) Balázs Bekő	(Montenegro) Vladan Savić	Jako	Phoenix Mecano, Bertrans
Mezőkövesd-Zsóry	(Hungary) György Véber	(Hungary) Attila Dobos	Puma	Zsóry-fürdő
MTK Budapest	(Hungary) József Garami	(Hungary) József Kanta	Nike	Panzi pet
Paksi FC	(Hungary) Aurél Csertői	(Hungary) László Éger	Jako	MVM-Atomerőmű
Lombard Pápa	(Hungary) Bálint Tóth	(Hungary) Lajos Szűcs	Jako	Lombard
Pécsi MFC	(Hungary) Gábor Márton	(Hungary) Levente Lantos	Puma	Matias
Puskás Akadémia FC	(Hungary) Miklós Benczés	(Hungary) Dénes Szakály	Jako	Mészáros és Mészáros Kft.
Újpest	(Serbia) Nebojša Vignjević	(Hungary) Krisztián Vermes	Puma	—
Videoton	(Portugal) José Manuel Gomes	(Hungary) Balázs Tóth	Nike	MOL

==== Managerial changes ====
Team	Outgoing manager	Manner of departure	Date of vacancy	Position in table	Replaced by	Date of appointment
Újpest	(Belgium) Marc Leliévre	—	1 June 2013	Pre-season	(Hungary) István Kozma (Belgium) Marc Leliévre	1 June 2013
Paksi FC	(Serbia) Tomislav Sivić	Mutual agreement	Summer 2013	Pre-season	(Hungary) Ferenc Horváth	22 June 2013
Diósgyőr	(Hungary) Zoltan Kovács	Contract expired	Summer 2013	Pre-season	(Serbia) Tomislav Sivić	26 June 2013
Kecskemét	(Hungary) Ferenc Horváth	Mutual agreement	22 June 2013	Pre-season	(Hungary) Balázs Bekő	24 June 2013
Újpest	(Hungary) István Kozma (Belgium) Marc Leliévre	Sacked; Resigned	23 October 2013	15th	(Serbia) Nebojša Vignjević	23 October 2013
Ferencváros	(Netherlands) Ricardo Moniz	Sacked	1 December 2013	7th	(Hungary) Csaba Máté (caretaker)	1 December 2013
Ferencváros	(Hungary) Csaba Máté (caretaker)	—	18 December 2013	5th	(Germany) Thomas Doll	18 December 2013
Győr	(Hungary) Attila Pintér	Signed by Hungary	19 December 2013	3rd	(Hungary) Ferenc Horváth	9 January 2014
Kaposvár	(Hungary) László Prukner	Mutual agreement	3 January 2014	16th	(Romania) Tibor Selymes	7 January 2014
Paksi FC	(Hungary) Ferenc Horváth	Signed by Győr	9 January 2014	13th	(Hungary) Aurél Csertői	9 January 2014
Honvéd FC	(Italy) Marco Rossi	Resigned	28 April 2014	8th	(Hungary) Miklós Simon (caretaker)	28 April 2014
Mezőkövesd	(Hungary) György Véber	Mutual agreement	5 May 2014	15th	(Hungary) László Tóth	6 May 2014
Pápa	(Hungary) Bálint Tóth	Mutual agreement	6 May 2014	11th	(Hungary) Mihály Nagy	6 May 2014

== League table ==
Pos	Team	Pld	W	D	L	GF	GA	GD	Pts	Qualification or relegation
1	Debrecen (C)	30	18	8	4	66	33	+33	62	Qualification for Champions League second qualifying round
2	Győr	30	18	8	4	58	32	+26	62	Qualification for Europa League second qualifying round
3	Ferencváros	30	17	6	7	47	33	+14	57	Qualification for Europa League first qualifying round
4	Videoton	30	15	8	7	52	31	+21	53	
5	Diósgyőr	30	12	11	7	45	38	+7	47	Qualification for Europa League first qualifying round (Note: Diósgyőr qualified for the Europa League first qualifying round as the 2013–14 Magyar Kupa runners-up since the winners, Újpest, failed to receive the UEFA license to participate in European competitions.)
6	Haladás	30	12	10	8	37	31	+6	46	
7	Pécs	30	12	9	9	41	38	+3	45	
8	MTK	30	11	7	12	42	36	+6	40	
9	Honvéd	30	10	6	14	37	39	−2	36	
10	Kecskemét	30	9	9	12	36	51	−15	36	
11	Paks	30	8	10	12	39	42	−3	34	
12	Pápa	30	9	6	15	32	50	−18	33	
13	Újpest	30	8	8	14	46	51	−5	32	
14	Puskás Akadémia	30	8	7	15	36	51	−15	31	
15	Mezőkövesd (R)	30	6	6	18	27	52	−25	24	Relegation to Nemzeti Bajnokság II
16	Kaposvár (R)	30	4	7	19	21	54	−33	19	Relegation to Nemzeti Bajnokság II

Source: mlsz.hu (in Hungarian)
Rules for classification: 1st points; 2nd overall wins; 3rd goal difference; 4th head-to-head points; 5th head-to-head goal difference; 6th head-to-head away goals scored; 7th fair-play points; 8th drawing of lots
(C) Champions; (R) Relegated

=== Positions by round ===
Team ╲ Round	1	2	3	4	5	6	7	8	9	10	11	12	13	14	15	16	17	18	19	20	21	22	23	24	25	26	27	28	29	30
Debrecen	1	1	1	2	1	2	1	3	2	3	3	3	2	2	1	1	1	1	1	1	1	1	1	1	1					
Győr	8	10	11	12	11	12	8	5	7	5	5	6	7	5	6	5	3	3	3	3	3	2	2	2	2					
Videoton	4	2	2	1	2	1	2	1	1	1	1	1	1	1	2	2	2	2	2	2	2	3	3	4	3					
Ferencváros	5	8	5	5	5	3	3	2	3	4	4	5	4	6	5	7	5	5	7	8	8	6	5	5	4					
Diósgyőr	7	9	12	13	9	7	5	4	4	2	2	2	3	3	3	3	4	4	4	4	5	8	6	6	5					
Haladás	14	12	9	8	8	6	9	7	8	6	6	7	5	4	4	4	6	6	8	6	7	4	4	3	6					
Pécs	11	13	15	14	13	11	7	9	10	11	12	10	9	9	8	6	7	8	6	5	6	7	8	7	7					
Honvéd	13	14	13	9	10	8	12	12	9	8	7	4	6	7	7	8	9	7	5	7	4	5	7	8	8					
Kecskemét	3	3	6	6	7	10	13	13	11	10	10	9	11	10	11	11	11	10	10	11	11	11	9	10	9					
Pápa	10	6	4	3	3	4	6	6	6	9	9	11	8	8	9	9	8	9	9	9	10	12	10	9	10					
Újpest	12	7	8	7	6	9	11	11	13	14	15	12	12	12	10	10	10	11	11	10	9	9	11	11	11					
Puskás Akadémia FC	9	11	14	15	14	15	15	15	15	12	13	14	14	14	15	14	14	12	12	12	12	10	12	12	12					
MTK	2	5	7	10	12	14	14	14	14	15	11	13	13	13	14	15	15	15	14	14	14	15	14	13	13					
Mezőkövesd	15	15	10	11	15	13	10	10	12	13	14	15	15	15	13	12	12	13	13	13	13	13	13	14	14					
Paks	6	4	3	4	4	5	4	8	5	7	8	8	10	11	12	13	13	14	15	15	15	14	15	15	15					
Kaposvári Rákóczi	16	16	16	16	16	16	16	16	16	16	16	16	16	16	16	16	16	16	16	16	16	16	16	16	16	16				

Leader
2013–14 UEFA Europa League First qualifying round
Relegation to 2014–15 Nemzeti Bajnokság II

Updated to match(es) played on 25 April 2014. Source: mlsz.hu (in Hungarian)

== Results ==
Home \ Away	DEB	DIÓ	FTC	GYŐ	HAL	HON	KEC	MEZ	MTK	PAK	PÁP	PÉC	PUS	RÁK	UTE	VID
Debrecen		4–0	4–1	2–2	2–0	0–2	5–0	1–0	1–0	2–2	2–2	1–0	2–1	7–1	3–1	2–1
Diósgyőr	1–1		1–4	1–2	1–1	2–0	1–1	5–0	2–2	0–4	2–1	3–0	2–3	1–0	2–0	2–2
Ferencváros	1–1	2–1		1–1	0–3	1–2	1–0	1–1	2–0	2–0	4–0	1–2	1–0	1–0	3–1	0–2
Győr	3–0	1–1	1–2		2–1	4–2	2–1	5–0	3–0	2–0	4–1	2–5	2–2	1–0	1–0	1–1
Haladás	1–1	2–2	0–1	2–2		2–0	1–0	1–0	0–0	1–3	3–2	1–3	2–1	4–1	1–0	1–1
Honvéd	1–3	1–2	0–2	1–1	2–1		1–1	0–2	0–2	1–1	0–1	3–1	3–0	1–0	3–2	0–1
Kecskemét	0–3	1–1	0–0	1–0	1–1	3–1		2–6	3–0	3–1	1–0	2–5	1–2	2–1	1–1	3–1
Mezőkövesd	2–2	0–1	0–1	3–0	0–2	1–0	0–1		1–0	2–2	0–2	0–1	3–1	1–3	0–1	1–1
MTK	5–2	2–2	3–2	1–2	0–1	1–1	2–2	3–0		2–0	2–0	0–1	2–1	2–0	0–1	1–2
Paks	0–0	0–2	2–2	1–2	0–1	1–1	2–0	1–1	1–3		4–0	2–1	4–1	2–0	2–4	2–2
Pápa	1–5	0–1	0–2	1–2	1–1	1–0	3–1	1–1	0–2	1–0		1–0	1–1	1–0	2–1	1–2
Pécs	2–1	1–1	1–2	1–1	1–1	1–0	0–0	2–1	1–0	1–1	1–3		1–2	3–1	0–0	1–1
Puskás Akadémia FC	0–1	0–2	3–1	0–1	1–2	0–4	2–2	4–0	1–1	1–0	1–0	1–1		1–0	1–2	1–3
Kaposvári Rákóczi	1–2	0–2	1–1	0–5	2–0	0–4	1–2	1–0	2–2	0–0	1–1	0–2	1–1		2–2	1–0
Újpest	1–4	2–0	1–2	1–2	1–1	1–1	6–1	6–1	0–4	1–2	4–2	1–1	3–3	1–1		1–2
Videoton	1–2	1–1	2–3	0–1	2–0	1–2	1–0	1–0	2–0	4–1	2–2	5–1	3–0	2–0	3–0	

Source: mlsz.hu (in Hungarian)
Legend: Blue = home team win; Yellow = draw; Red = away team win.

== Top goalscorers ==
Including matches played on 1 June 2014; Source:

Rank	Scorer	Club	Goals
1	(Hungary) Attila Simon	Paks	18
1	(Hungary) Nemanja Nikolić	Videoton	18
3	(Hungary) László Lencse	Puskás AFC	15
4	(Hungary) András Radó	Haladás	14
5	(Hungary) Krisztián Koller	Pécsi MFC	12
6	(Hungary) Dániel Böde	Ferencváros	11
7	(Hungary) József Kanta	MTK	10
7	(Senegal) Ibrahima Sidibe	Debrecen	10
9	(Hungary) Patrik Tischler	Puskás AFC	9
9	(Hungary) Tamás Kulcsár	Debrecen	9
9	(Hungary) Márkó Futács	DVTK	9
9	(Cape Verde) Zé Luís	Videoton	9

== Hat-tricks ==
Name	For	Against	Round	Result	Date
(Hungary) Attila Simon	Paks	Puskás AFC	3rd	4–1	10 August 2013
(Hungary) László Lencse	Puskás AFC	Mezőkövesd	21st	4–0	22 March 2014

== Attendances ==
#	Club	Average attendance
1	Ferencváros	8,447
2	Debrecen	6,913
3	Diósgyőr	5,855
4	Videoton	3,013
5	Szombathelyi Haladás	2,908
6	Győr	2,800
7	Mezőkövesd	2,440
8	Újpest	2,435
9	Kecskemét	1,990
10	Pécs	1,687
11	Lombard Pápa	1,517
12	MTK	1,480
13	Kaposvár	1,427
14	Budapest Honvéd	1,337
15	Paks	1,333
16	Puskás	1,022
