= Kozármisleny FC =

Hungarian football club

- Full name: HR-Rent Kozármisleny FC
- Nickname: Misleny
- Founded: 1989; 37 years ago
- Ground: Alkotmány tér stadion, Kozármisleny
- Capacity: 1,700
- Chairman: Attila Feleki
- Manager: Máté Pinezits
- League: NB II
- 2025–26: NB II, 4th of 16
- Website: www.kozarmislenyfc.hu
Home colours	Away colours

Kozármisleny FC is a football club based in Kozármisleny, Hungary. The team is currently playing in the league NB II, which is the second tier of Hungarian football.

== History ==
Kozármisleny won the 2001–01 season of the Megyei Bajnokság I of Baranya County. The next season the club was eligible to play in the Nemzeti Bajnokság III, the third tier of the Hungarian football league system.

In their first season in the Nemzeti Bajnokság III, 2002–03 Nemzeti Bajnokság III, the club finished 6th.

Kozármisleny won the 2006–07 Nemzeti Bajnokság III season, preceding Komlói Bányász SK and Szentlőrinci SE. The following year, the club competed in the Nemzeti Bajnokság II for the first time in the club's history.

On 5 June 2008, Gábor Márton resigned as the head coach of the club.

In the 2010–11 Nemzeti Bajnokság II season, Kozármisleny finished 8th.

In 2012, Kozármisleny and Pécsi MFC signed a contract of collaboration.

On 1 January 2013, Zsolt Szabó and József Mucha were appointed as head coaches of the club.

After four consecutive seasons, the club were relegated in the 2013–14 Nemzeti Bajnokság II season. The club finished in the 15th position, preceding only Tatabányai SC, losing 19 matches and winning only 5 matches in the season.

Kozármisleny won the 2015–16 Nemzeti Bajnokság III season, and they were promoted to the second division for the second time. The club won 25 matches and lost only one match in the season.

However, the return to the second league was ephemeral, since the club finished in the 18th position in the 2016–17 Nemzeti Bajnokság III season and were relegated again to the third tier of the Hungarian league system.

Kozármisleny won the 2021-22 Nemzeti Bajnokság III season, and they were promoted to the second division again.

On 2 March 2023, Gábor Márton was appointed as the head coach of the club. In the 2022–23 Nemzeti Bajnokság II season, the club finished in the 16th position. The club had to play relegation play-offs against Iváncsa KSE. Although Kozármisleny lost to Iváncsa at home (0–1) on 28 May 2023, the second leg was won by Kozármisleny 3–0 on 4 June 2023, thus Kozármisleny could stay in the second division.

In the 2023–24 Nemzeti Bajnokság II, Kozármisleny beat BFC Siófok 7–0 on 26 November 2023.

On 21 December 2025, Mátyás Czuczi, former assistant coach of Bernd Storck and Joan Carrillo, was appointed as the coach of the club.

== Honors ==
- Nemzeti Bajnokság III:
  - Winners (3): 2006–07, 2015–16, 2021–22

== Current squad ==
As of 20 January 2026

Note: Flags indicate national team as defined under FIFA eligibility rules; some limited exceptions apply. Players may hold more than one non-FIFA nationality.

No.	Pos.	Nation	Player
1	GK	HUN	István Oroszi
5	DF	HUN	Gergő Gajág
7	MF	HUN	Vajk Gazdag
8	FW	HUN	Balázs Vogyicska
9	FW	HUN	Bence Babinszky
10	MF	HUN	Sámuel Bakó (on loan from MTK)
11	MF	HUN	Martin Ebot
12	DF	HUN	Timóteus Mikolay
15	MF	HUN	Axel Gellér
17	DF	HUN	Márk Bíró
20	DF	HUN	Donát Dóra
21	DF	UKR	Botond Herczeg (on loan from MTK II)

No.	Pos.	Nation	Player
22	MF	HUN	Barnabás Kozics
23	MF	HUN	Dominik Szalka
24	MF	HUN	Dominik Kocsis
28	FW	HUN	Zoltán Csucsánszky
30	DF	HUN	Zétény Pupp (on loan from Paks)
41	GK	HUN	Marcell Kátai-Urbán
55	DF	HUN	Dániel Horváth
66	GK	HUN	Soma Lékai
70	FW	HUN	Balázs Zamostny
77	DF	HUN	Tamás Turi
81	DF	HUN	Roland Vajda
90	FW	HUN	Dániel Zsóri (on loan from MTK)

=== Out on loan ===
Note: Flags indicate national team as defined under FIFA eligibility rules; some limited exceptions apply. Players may hold more than one non-FIFA nationality.

No.	Pos.	Nation	Player
16	DF	HUN	Bence Bodrogi (at Egri FC until 30 June 2026)
32	FW	HUN	Richárd Jelena (at Ajka until 30 June 2026)

== Seasons ==
The table below shows the seasons of HR-Rent Kozármisleny FC.

Season	Tier	Club's name	Position	Pts
1952	4	Kozármisleny	0 / 7	
1954	5	Kozármisleny	8 / 9	5
1955	5	Kozármisleny	9 / 10	11
1956	5	Kozármisleny	0 / 6	
1958–59	5	Kozármisleny	5 / 10	16
1959–60	5	Kozármisleny	0 / 10	
1960–61	6	Kozármisleny	1 / 8	21
1962–63	7	Kozármisleny	0 / 6	
1964	8	Kozármisleny	0 / 4	
1965	8	Kozármisleny	1 / 10	
1966	7	Kozármisleny	0 / 9	
1967	7	Kozármisleny	0 / 9	
1968	7	Kozármisleny	5 / 10	17
1969	7	Kozármisleny	9 / 10	8
1970–71	7	Kozármisleny	4 / 10	22
1971–72	7	Kozármisleny	0 / 10	
1972–73	7	Kozármisleny	5 / 8	12
1973–74	7	Kozármisleny	10 / 10	7
1974–75	7	Kozármisleny	4 / 7	12
1975–76	7	Kozármisleny	1 / 7	10
1976–77	7	Kozármisleny	4 / 5	
1981–82	6	Kozármisleny	6 / 7	6
1982–83	6	Kozármisleny	5 / 7	7
1983–84	6	Kozármisleny	4 / 7	12
1988–89	7	Kozármisleny	1 / 7	22
1989–90	6	Kozármisleny	11 / 14	28
1990–91	6	Kozármisleny	6 / 14	27
1991–92	5	Kozármisleny	9 / 16	22
1992–93	5	Kozármisleny	5 / 16	36
1993–94	5	Kozármisleny	1 / 16	52
1994–95	4	Kozármisleny SE	15 / 16	27
1995–96	4	Kozármisleny SE	3 / 16	56
1996–97	4	Kozármisleny SE	13 / 16	24
1997–98	5	Kozármisleny SE	6 / 18	53
1998–99	5	Kozármisleny SE	3 / 16	57
1999–00	5	Kozármisleny SE	4 / 16	51
2000–01	5	Kozármisleny SE	3 / 16	56
2001–02	5	Kozármisleny SE	1 / 16	72
2002–03	4	Kozármisleny SE	6 / 16	42
2003–04	4	Kozármisleny SE	10 / 16	33
2004–05	4	Kozármisleny SE	4 / 15	45
2005–06	3	Kozármisleny SE	7 / 16	42
2006–07	3	Kozármisleny SE	1 / 14	60
2007–08	2	Kozármisleny SE	7 / 16	40
2008–09	2	Kozármisleny SE	8 / 16	39
2009–10	2	Gold-Sport-Kozármisleny SE	6 / 15	41
2010–11	2	Gold-Sport-Kozármisleny SE	8 / 16	45
2011–12	2	Gold-Sport-Kozármisleny SE	2 / 16	55
2012–13	2	Kozármisleny FC	2 / 16	60
2013–14	2	Kozármisleny FC	15 / 16	21
2014–15	3	Kozármisleny FC	2 / 16	61
2015–16	3	HR-Rent Kozármisleny FC	1 / 17	81
2016–17	2	HR-Rent Kozármisleny FC	18 / 20	37
2017–18	3	HR-Rent Kozármisleny FC	11 / 16	34
2018–19	3	HR-Rent Kozármisleny FC	10 / 16	38
2019–20	3	HR-Rent Kozármisleny FC	6 / 16	31
2020–21	3	HR-Rent Kozármisleny FC	6 / 20	57
2021–22	3	HR-Rent Kozármisleny FC	1 / 20	92
2022–23	2	HR-Rent Kozármisleny FC	16 / 20	41
2023–24	2	HR-Rent Kozármisleny FC	5 / 18	52
2024–25	2	HR-Rent Kozármisleny FC	4 / 16	47
2025–26	2	HR-Rent Kozármisleny FC	4 / 16	48
