= 2008–09 Pécsi MFC season =

Pécs
2008–09 season
- Manager: Tamás Nagy (until 26 August); Antal Róth (from 26 August to 5 May); Antal Botos (from 5 May)
- Stadium: Stadion PMFC
- Nemzeti Bajnokság II (West): 3rd
- Magyar Kupa: Round of 32
- Ligakupa: Runners-up
- Top goalscorer: League: Gergő Lovrencsics (10); All: Zsolt Horváth (16)
- Highest home attendance: 3,200 (vs Kozármisleny, 16 August 2008)
- Lowest home attendance: 500 (vs Győr II, 6 June 2009)
- Average home league attendance: 1,428
Home colours

The 2008–09 season was Pécsi Mecsek Football Club's 44th competitive season, 2nd consecutive season in the Nemzeti Bajnokság II and 58th year in existence as a football club. In addition to the domestic league, Pécs participated in this season's editions of the Magyar Kupa and Ligakupa.

== First team squad ==
The players listed had league appearances.

Note: Flags indicate national team as defined under FIFA eligibility rules; some limited exceptions apply. Players may hold more than one non-FIFA nationality.

No.	Pos.	Nation	Player
1	GK	HUN	Roland Herbert
4	MF	HUN	Máté Gulyás
4	DF	HUN	József Nagy
5	DF	HUN	József Szabados
6	DF	HUN	Gábor Kovács
6	MF	HUN	László Megyesi
7	MF	HUN	Dávid Wittrédi
8	DF	HUN	János Sipos
10	MF	HUN	Olivér Nagy
11	MF	HUN	Árpád Kulcsár
12	GK	HUN	Dénes Dibusz
14	MF	HUN	Adrián Nagy
18	MF	HUN	Levente Lantos
19	DF	HUN	Zoltán Finta
19	FW	HUN	Szabolcs Gyánó

No.	Pos.	Nation	Player
20	FW	HUN	Gergő Lovrencsics
21	DF	HUN	Roland Racskó
22	MF	HUN	Béla Koplárovics
25	MF	HUN	Balázs Fónai
26	MF	HUN	Balázs Schrancz
27	FW	HUN	Tamás Szalai
31	GK	HUN	Lajos Hegedűs
33	DF	HUN	Ádám Présinger
61	MF	HUN	Gábor Simonfalvi
69	FW	HUN	Zsolt Horváth
77	FW	HUN	Norbert Szabó
82	MF	HUN	Balázs Berdó
85	DF	HUN	Tamás Törtei
88	MF	HUN	Dávid Luczek

== Competitions ==
=== Overview ===
Competition	First match	Last match	Starting round	Final position	Record							
Competition	First match	Last match	Starting round	Final position	Pld	W	D	L	GF	GA	GD	Win %
Nemzeti Bajnokság II (West)	9 August 2008	13 June 2009	Matchday 1	3rd	30	20	5	5	62	21	+41	66.67
Magyar Kupa	19 August 2008	24 September 2008	Second round	Round of 32	3	2	0	1	8	9	−1	66.67
Ligakupa	1 October 2008	13 May 2009	Group stage	Runners-up	15	10	2	3	34	20	+14	66.67
Total					48	32	7	9	104	50	+54	66.67

Source: Competitions

=== Nemzeti Bajnokság II (West) ===
==== League table ====
Pos	Team	Pld	W	D	L	GF	GA	GD	Pts	Promotion or relegation
1	Gyirmót	30	20	7	3	60	30	+30	67	
2	Pápa (P)	30	20	6	4	65	19	+46	66	Promotion to Nemzeti Bajnokság I
3	Pécs	30	20	5	5	62	21	+41	65	
4	Tatabánya	30	15	6	9	49	35	+14	51	
5	Kaposvölgye	30	15	5	10	50	42	+8	50	

Source: Hungarian Football Federation (in Hungarian), Soccerway
Rules for classification: 1) Points; 2) Matches won; 3) Goal difference; 4) Goals scored; 5) Head-to-head points; 6) Head-to-head goal difference; 7) Head-to-head away goals scored; 8) Fair play ranking; 9) Drawing of lots.
(P) Promoted

==== Results summary ====
Overall								Home						Away					
Pld	W	D	L	GF	GA	GD	Pts	W	D	L	GF	GA	GD	W	D	L	GF	GA	GD
30	20	5	5	62	21	+41	65	12	3	0	36	7	+29	8	2	5	26	14	+12

Source: HFF

==== Results by round ====
Round	1	2	3	4	5	6	7	8	9	10	11	12	13	14	15	16	17	18	19	20	21	22	23	24	25	26	27	28	29	30
Ground	A	H	A	H	A	H	A	H	A	A	H	A	H	A	H	H	A	H	A	H	A	H	A	H	H	A	H	A	H	A
Result	W	W	L	W	L	D	W	W	W	L	W	D	W	W	W	W	W	W	W	D	L	W	D	D	W	W	W	L	W	W
Position	5	1	7	1	5	6	5	2	2	2	2	2	2	2	2	2	1	1	1	1	1	1	2	2	2	2	2	3	3	3

Source: Matches
A = Away; H = Home; W = Win; D = Draw; L = Loss

==== Matches ====
9 August 2008 1	Integrál-DAC	1–2	Pécs	Győr
18:00 CEST (UTC+2)	Müller 39'; Pál (yellow card) 69'	Report	Szalai 49'; Lovrencsics 62'; Kulcsár (yellow card) 90'	Stadium: Nádorvárosi stadion Attendance: 150; Referee: Norbert Kiss

16 August 2008 2	Pécs	2–0	Kozármisleny	Pécs
19:00 CEST (UTC+2)	Szalai (yellow card) 13', (goal) 69'; Berdó (yellow card) 22'; Kulcsár 87' (pen.)	Report	P. Kanizsai (yellow card) 30'; T. Molnár (yellow card) 76'; J. Kutyáncsánin (yellow card) 83'	Stadium: Stadion PMFC; Attendance: 3,200; Referee: Krisztián Pánczél

23 August 2008 3	Baja	2–1	Pécs	Baja
17:30 CEST (UTC+2)	Ribeiro 7', (yellow card) 78'; S. Stojanović (yellow card) 15'; G. Sziegl 68'	Report	Lantos 52'; Szalai (yellow card) 70'; O. Nagy (yellow card) 81'	Stadium: Városi Stadion; Attendance: 1,000; Referee: Péter Solymosi

30 August 2008 4	Pécs	2–1	Budaörs	Pécs
19:00 CEST (UTC+2)	Lovrencsics 35'; Kulcsár (red card) 74'; Szalai 90'	Report	R. Nagy 26', (red card) 63'	Stadium: Stadion PMFC; Attendance: 2,000; Referee: József Berger

7 September 2008 5	Gyirmót	2–0	Pécs	Győr
18:00 CEST (UTC+2)	L. Nagy 20', 87'; G. Polyák (yellow card) 84'	Report	Törtei (yellow card) 6'	Stadium: Ménfői úti Stadion; Attendance: 400; Referee: Gábor Oláh

13 September 2008 6	Pécs	2–2	Tatabánya	Pécs
19:00 CEST (UTC+2)	Koplárovics 18'; G. Gellér 72' (o.g.); Gulyás (yellow card) 89'	Report	D. Kollár 28'; N. Vass (yellow card) 30'; G. Gellér 68'; Béres (yellow card) 81'	Stadium: Stadion PMFC; Attendance: 1,000; Referee: Ádám Németh

21 September 2008 7	Barcs	0–1	Pécs	Barcs
16:00 CEST (UTC+2)	Tahirović (yellow card) 40'; G. Pókos (yellow card) 75'	Report	Koplárovics 43'; Wittrédi (yellow card) 50'	Stadium: Barcsi Szabadidőközpont; Attendance: 400; Referee: Norbert Kiss

27 September 2008 8	Pécs	3–1	Kaposvölgye	Pécs
18:00 CEST (UTC+2)	Lovrencsics 27', 42'; Z. Horváth 75'	Report	Udvari (yellow card) 12'; J. Strublics (yellow card) 41'; T. Fodor 50'; G. Jagodits (yellow card) 56'; Andruskó (yellow card) 65'; J. Vaskó (yellow card) 77'	Stadium: Stadion PMFC; Attendance: 700; Referee: József Erdős

4 October 2008 9	Ajka	0–3	Pécs	Ajka
15:00 CEST (UTC+2)	B. Badics (yellow card) 7'; Á. Grőber (yellow card) 55'; J. Imre (yellow card) 57'; A. Manganelli (yellow card) 74'	Report	Törtei (yellow card) 37'; Szabados 45'; Fónai 55' (pen.); Wittrédi (yellow card) 81'; Berdó (yellow card) 90', (goal) 90'	Stadium: Városi Stadion; Attendance: 800; Referee: Gábor Péter Kovács

12 October 2008 10	Dunaújváros	1–0	Pécs	Dunaújváros
15:00 CEST (UTC+2)	I. Szauter (yellow card) 26'; Facskó (yellow card) 33'; I. Nagy 46'; Heffler (yellow card) 51'; M. Micskó (yellow card) 90'	Report	Törtei (yellow card) 39'	Stadium: Eszperantó úti Stadion; Attendance: 500; Referee: Zoltán Iványi

18 October 2008 11	Pécs	3–0	Százhalombatta	Pécs
17:00 CEST (UTC+2)	Lovrencsics 7'; Szalai 12'; Berdó (yellow card) 51'; Szabados 65'	Report	D. Ferenc (yellow card) 6'; I. Janovics (yellow card) 48'; Havrán (yellow card) 69'	Stadium: Stadion PMFC; Attendance: 1,000; Referee: Gábor Fajkusz

25 October 2008 12	Felcsút	1–1	Pécs	Felcsút
15:00 CEST (UTC+2)	Bölcsföldi (yellow card) 42', (goal) 47'; Kocsis (yellow card) 57'; Domján (red card) 90'	Report	Lantos (yellow card) 13'; Berdó 17'; Fónai (yellow card) 90+1'	Stadium: Felcsút Sporttelep; Attendance: 300; Referee: János Takács

1 November 2008 13	Pécs	2–1	Pápa	Pécs
17:00 CET (UTC+1)	Koplárovics (yellow card) 55'; Wittrédi 58'; Szalai 64' (pen.); Sipos (yellow card) 65'	Report	Varga 40', (yellow card) 57'; Rajnay (yellow card) 50'; Schrancz (yellow card) 84'; Császár (red card) 87'	Stadium: Stadion PMFC; Attendance: 2,000; Referee: Sándor Andó-Szabó

9 November 2008 14	Győr II	1–2	Pécs	Győr
13:30 CET (UTC+1)	Fomumbod 4'; P. Molnár (yellow card) 8'; M. Tóth (yellow card) 83'	Report	Szalai 8'; Lantos (yellow card) 32'; Berdó 68'	Stadium: ETO Park; Attendance: 300; Referee: Ferenc Bede

15 November 2008 15	Pécs	3–0	Zalaegerszeg II	Pécs
16:00 CET (UTC+1)	Berdó 13'; O. Nagy 18'; Szalai 58'	Report	D. Borsos (yellow card) 7'; A. Horváth (yellow card) 33'; I. Bozsoki (red card) 73'	Stadium: Stadion PMFC; Attendance: 1,000; Referee: József Erdős

7 March 2009 16	Pécs	2–0	DAC	Pécs
17:00 CET (UTC+1)	Z. Horváth 15'; Wittrédi 36'; Koplárovics (yellow card) 52'	Report	Simpson (yellow card) 16'; Ludánszki (yellow card) 36'	Stadium: Stadion PMFC; Attendance: 800; Referee: Tamás Bognár

14 March 2009 17	Kozármisleny	0–2	Pécs	Kozármisleny
14:30 CET (UTC+1)	Dienes (yellow card) 30'; J. Kutyáncsánin (yellow card) 41'; Bartha (yellow card) 61'; Z. Tóth (yellow card) 63'; P. Kanizsai (red card) 70'	Report	Lantos (yellow card) 14'; Wittrédi 50', (yellow card) 66'; O. Nagy (yellow card) 53'; J. Nagy (yellow card) 75'; Lovrencsics 81'; Fónai (yellow card) 90'	Stadium: Kozármislenyi Stadion; Attendance: 2,000; Referee: József Berger

21 March 2009 18	Pécs	2–0	Baja	Pécs
17:00 CET (UTC+1)	Wittrédi (yellow card) 12'; Z. Horváth 15'; Kulcsár 88'	Report	D. Veselinov (yellow card) 30'; Z. Lógó (yellow card) 39'; J. Facskó (yellow card) 67'	Stadium: Stadion PMFC; Attendance: 1,400; Referee: József Erdős

4 April 2009 20	Pécs	1–1	Gyirmót	Pécs
18:00 CEST (UTC+2)	J. Nagy (yellow card) 54'; Kulcsár 58'	Report	A. Pék (yellow card) 24'; N. Tóth 67', (yellow card) 83'; Kiss (yellow card) 81'	Stadium: Stadion PMFC; Attendance: 2,500; Referee: Péter Solymosi

12 April 2009 21	Tatabánya	2–1	Pécs	Tatabánya
16:30 CEST (UTC+2)	Z. Fehér 2'; N. Vass (yellow card) 19'; V. Farkas (yellow card) 66'; Béres 67'	Report	Wittrédi 42'; G. Kovács I (yellow card) 75'; Koplárovics (yellow card) 81'; Lantos (yellow card) 90+3'	Stadium: Stadion Gyula Grosics; Attendance: 1,000; Referee: Mihály Fábián

15 April 2009 19	Budaörs	1–2	Pécs	Budaörs
16:30 CEST (UTC+2)	J. Farkas 21'; R. Nagy (red card) 37'; L. Lalusz (yellow card) 41'; Csillag (yellow card) 80'; A. Végh (yellow card) 82'; T. Mihályi (yellow card) 86'	Report	Lantos (yellow card) 27'; Présinger (yellow card) 47'; Szalai (yellow card) 56'; Schrancz (yellow card) 57'; O. Nagy 64'; Szabados 81'	Stadium: Árok utcai pálya Attendance: 200; Referee: István Mészáros

19 April 2009 22	Pécs	3–0	Barcs	Pécs
18:00 CEST (UTC+2)	Présinger 23'; Gyánó 80', 88'	Report	Koller (yellow card) 58'	Stadium: Stadion PMFC; Attendance: 1,500; Referee: Tamás Bognár

25 April 2009 23	Kaposvölgye	1–1	Pécs	Nagyberki
15:00 CEST (UTC+2)	L. Szűcs 47'	Report	Berdó 38'	Stadium: Vásártéri Sporttelep; Attendance: 400; Referee: Ádám Németh

3 May 2009 24	Pécs	1–1	Ajka	Pécs
18:00 CEST (UTC+2)	Szalai 27'	Report	Z. Gunther 12'	Stadium: Stadion PMFC; Attendance: 900; Referee: Gábor Oláh

9 May 2009 25	Pécs	3–0; Awarded	Dunaújváros	Pécs
18:00 CEST (UTC+2)		Report		Stadium: Stadion PMFC

16 May 2009 26	Százhalombatta	0–6	Pécs	Százhalombatta
18:00 CEST (UTC+2)	Z. Vass (yellow card) 15'; Havrán (yellow card) 21'; L. Bakó (yellow card) 60'	Report	Wittrédi 11', 32'; Lovrencsics 52', 89'; O. Nagy 63'; Z. Horváth 84'	Stadium: Százhalombattai Városi Szabadidő Központ; Attendance: 200; Referee: Zoltán Iványi

23 May 2009 27	Pécs	5–0	Felcsút	Pécs
18:00 CEST (UTC+2)	Berdó 7', (yellow card) 8'; Fónai 16'; O. Nagy (yellow card) 53'; Z. Horváth 58', 70'; Lovrencsics 89'	Report	Bakos (yellow card) 53'	Stadium: Stadion PMFC; Attendance: 1,500; Referee: Viktor Kassai

30 May 2009 28	Pápa	1–0	Pécs	Pápa
19:00 CEST (UTC+2)	Bali 80'	Report	Gyánó (yellow card) 32'; Présinger (yellow card) 59'; Szalai (yellow card) 85'; Hegedűs (red card) 90+1'	Stadium: Perutz Stadion; Attendance: 4,000; Referee: Tamás Arany

6 June 2009 29	Pécs	2–0	Győr II	Pécs
19:00 CEST (UTC+2)	Fónai 51'; Berdó 85'	Report		Stadium: Stadion PMFC; Attendance: 500; Referee: Zoltán J. Kovács

13 June 2009 30	Zalaegerszeg II	1–4	Pécs	Zalaegerszeg
18:00 CEST (UTC+2)	Dóczi 25'; D. Borsos (yellow card) 40'; P. Péter (yellow card) 42'; Polareczki (yellow card) 44'; G. Sági (red card) 75'	Report	Berdó (yellow card) 38'; Koplárovics 42'; O. Nagy 69'; Lovrencsics 85'; Lantos 90+1'	Stadium: ZTE Arena; Attendance: 500; Referee: Krisztián Király

=== Magyar Kupa ===
19 August 2008 Second round	Szekszárd	3–4	Pécs	Szekszárd
17:00 CEST (UTC+2)	I. Pulcz (yellow card) 63'; Vituska 65'; E. Horváth 72'; A. Fehér (red card) 86'; P. Ganczer 90'	Report	A. Nagy 11'; Gulyás (yellow card) 36'; Z. Kalmár 41'; Megyesi 50'; Lovrencsics 61'	Stadium: Városi Stadion; Attendance: 200; Referee: Ferenc Szöllősi

3 September 2008 Third round	Decs	1–4	Pécs	Decs
15:30 CEST (UTC+2)	J. Kiss	Report	L. Diriczi (o.g.); Fónai; Lovrencsics; O. Nagy	Stadium: Decsi Sportpálya; Attendance: 500; Referee: János Kőrösi

24 September 2008 Round of 32	Pécs	0–5	Győr	Pécs
19:00 CEST (UTC+2)	A. Nagy (yellow card) 71'	Report	Z. Kovács II (red card) 15'; Brnović 28' (pen.), 56'; Völgyi (yellow card) 35'; Z. Kovács I 42', 56'; Pákolicz 80'	Stadium: Stadion PMFC; Attendance: 1,500; Referee: Péter Solymosi

=== Ligakupa ===
==== Group stage ====
Pos	Team	Pld	W	D	L	GF	GA	GD	Pts	Qualification	UJP	PEC	KAP	ZAL	PAK	DUN
1	Újpest	10	6	2	2	25	15	+10	20	Advance to knockout phase	—	4–0	2–4	2–1	0–0	5–1
2	Pécs	10	6	2	2	24	14	+10	20	Advance to knockout phase	1–1	—	2–4	2–0	3–1	3–1
3	Kaposvár	10	6	1	3	26	20	+6	19		2–4	1–4	—	1–0	2–1	2–2
4	Zalaegerszeg	10	4	1	5	15	15	0	13		2–3	0–0	0–5	—	3–1	5–0
5	Paks	10	3	2	5	17	14	+3	11		3–1	0–1	4–0	0–2	—	2–2
6	Dunaújváros	10	0	2	8	11	40	−29	2		1–3	2–8	1–5	1–2	0–5	—

Source: HFF

1 October 2008 1	Paks	0–1	Pécs	Paks
14:30 CEST (UTC+2)	Weitner (yellow card) 25'; Mészáros (yellow card) 30'; Vári (yellow card) 63'; Z. Molnár (red card) 85'	Report	Lovrencsics 63'	Stadium: Fehérvári úti Stadion; Attendance: 150; Referee: Gergely Sulyok

15 October 2008 2	Pécs	2–0	Zalaegerszeg	Pécs
17:00 CEST (UTC+2)	Wittrédi 21' (pen.); Z. Horváth 24'; D. Luczek (yellow card) 41'	Report	Máté (yellow card) 73'	Stadium: Stadion PMFC; Attendance: 400; Referee: Csaba Pintér

29 October 2008 3	Pécs	1–1	Újpest	Pécs
17:00 CET (UTC+1)	Z. Horváth 14'; Lantos (yellow card) 23'	Report	Remili (yellow card) 39'; A. Simon 53'	Stadium: Stadion PMFC; Attendance: 600; Referee: Gergely Sulyok

5 November 2008 4	Kaposvár	1–4	Pécs	Kaposvár
14:00 CET (UTC+1)	Reszli 67' (pen.)	Report	A. Nagy 11'; Z. Horváth 23', 32', 35'; Finta (yellow card) 66'	Stadium: Rákóczi Stadion; Attendance: 150; Referee: Ádám Németh

19 November 2008 5	Pécs	3–1	Dunaújváros	Pécs
	A. Nagy (yellow card) 28'; Wittrédi 51', 53' (pen.); Z. Horváth 73', (yellow card) 89'	Report	G. Rátkai (yellow card) 24'; Frőhlich 27'; P. Wilson (yellow card) 52'; I. Szauter (yellow card) 76'; I. Nagy (yellow card) 83'	Stadium: Stadion PMFC; Attendance: 300; Referee: Gergő Király

22 November 2008 6	Pécs	3–1	Paks	Pécs
13:00 CET (UTC+1)	Berdó 63'; Wittrédi 81' (pen.); Megyesi (yellow card) 86'; Z. Horváth 90'	Report	G. Tamási 43'; J. Szabó (yellow card) 57'; Vári (yellow card) 59'; Böde (yellow card) 64'; Pandur (yellow card) 80'; Buzás (yellow card) 87'	Stadium: Stadion PMFC; Attendance: 250; Referee: József Berger

29 November 2008 7	Zalaegerszeg	0–0	Pécs	Zalaegerszeg
14:00 CET (UTC+1)		Report		Stadium: ZTE Arena; Attendance: 100; Referee: Csaba Pintér

7 December 2008 8	Újpest	4–0	Pécs	Budapest
13:00 CET (UTC+1)	Lipták 27'; Remili (yellow card) 28', (goal) 71'; Kéthévoama 56'; A. Simon 67'	Report	Lantos (yellow card) 44'	Stadium: Szusza Ferenc Stadium; Referee: Zoltán Iványi

8 February 2009 9	Pécs	2–4	Kaposvár	Pécs
14:00 CET (UTC+1)	Szalai 11' (pen.); Kulcsár (yellow card) 50'; Szabados 57'	Report	K. Farkas 65', 90'; Petrók (yellow card) 69'; Reszli 83'; Nikolić 85'; Graszl (yellow card) 87'	Stadium: Stadion PMFC; Attendance: 300; Referee: József Berger

11 February 2009 10	Dunaújváros	2–8	Pécs	Kaposvár
	A. Nagy (yellow card) 44'; Sukore 50'; T. Czár 71'; Homonyik (yellow card) 85'	Report	Z. Horváth 23', 76', (yellow card) 33'; Berdó 25', 36'; Törtei 42'; Wittrédi 47'; J. Nagy 77'; Fónai 82'	Stadium: Cseri úti Sporttelep; Attendance: 50; Referee: Sándor Andó-Szabó

==== Knockout phase ====
===== Quarter-finals =====
4 March 2009 First Leg	Pécs	3–2	Haladás	Pécs
17:00 CET (UTC+1)	G. Kovács 75'; Z. Horváth 84'; Wittrédi (yellow card) 85'; Berdó 90+2', (yellow card) 90+2'	Report	Kenesei 44'; Kuttor 47'; Á. Simon (yellow card) 52'; Bonifert (yellow card) 71'; Devecseri (yellow card) 90+2'	Stadium: Stadion PMFC; Attendance: 600; Referee: István Mészáros

17 March 2009 Second leg	Haladás	1–4 (3–7 agg.)	Pécs	Szombathely
17:00 CET (UTC+1)	Andorka 49'	Report	O. Nagy 10'; Szalai 22'; Lovrencsics 70'; Kulcsár 80'	Stadium: Rohonci Street Stadium; Attendance: 800; Referee: Gergely Sulyok
Note: Pécs won 7–3 on aggregate.

===== Semi-finals =====
29 March 2009 First Leg	Honvéd	0–1	Pécs	Budapest
17:30 CEST (UTC+2)	Filó (yellow card) 41'	Report	Berdó 82', (yellow card) 82'	Stadium: Bozsik Stadion; Attendance: 500; Referee: Ádám Farkas

9 April 2009 Second leg	Pécs	1–0 (2–0 agg.)	Honvéd	Pécs
18:00 CEST (UTC+2)	Berdó (yellow card) 19'; Gyánó (yellow card) 35', (goal) 59'; Présinger (yellow card) 62'	Report	Fazakas (yellow card) 14'; Smiljanić (yellow card) 19'; Filó (red card) 45'; Rigonato (yellow card) 61'; Lungu (yellow card) 90+4'	Stadium: Stadion PMFC; Attendance: 2,000; Referee: István Vad
Note: Pécs won 2–0 on aggregate.

===== Final =====
13 May 2009 Final	Pécs	1–3	Fehérvár	Siófok
18:00 CEST (UTC+2)	Lantos (red card) 12'; Wittrédi 58'; Koplárovics (yellow card) 64'	Report	Vujović 13' (pen.), 26'; Anđić (yellow card) 36'; Lázár (yellow card) 39'; Silva 69'	Stadium: Révész Géza utcai Stadion; Attendance: 3,000; Referee: Ferenc Bede

== Statistics ==
=== Overall ===
Appearances (Apps) numbers are for appearances in competitive games only, including sub appearances.
Source: Competitions

No.	Player	Pos.	Nemzeti Bajnokság II				Magyar Kupa				Ligakupa				Total			
No.	Player	Pos.	Apps	Goal	Yellow card	Sent off	Apps	Goal	Yellow card	Sent off	Apps	Goal	Yellow card	Sent off	Apps	Goal	Yellow card	Sent off
1	(Hungary) Roland Herbert	GK	25				1								26			
3	(Hungary) Gábor Dara										1				1			
3	(Hungary) László Tamás	DF									1				1			
4	(Hungary) Máté Gulyás	MF	2		1		2		1		5				9		2	
4	(Hungary) József Nagy	DF	9		2						6	1			15	1	2	
5	(Hungary) József Szabados	DF	28	3			1				5	1			34	4		
6	(Hungary) Gábor Kovács	DF	9		1						6	1			15	1	1	
6	(Hungary) László Megyesi	MF	1				2	1			4		1		7	1	1	
7	(Hungary) Dávid Wittrédi	MF	20	6	4		1				14	6	1		35	12	5	
8	(Hungary) János Sipos	DF	25		1		1				6				32		1	
10	(Hungary) Olivér Nagy	MF	25	4	3		3	1			10	1			38	6	3	
11	(Hungary) Árpád Kulcsár	MF	11	3	1	1					4	1	1		15	4	2	1
12	(Hungary) Dénes Dibusz	GK	1												1			
14	(Hungary) András Fülöp										1				1			
14	(Hungary) Adrián Horváth	MF									1				1			
14	(Hungary) Adrián Nagy	MF	3				3	1	1		7	1	1		13	2	2	
16	(Hungary) Csaba Sólyom	GK					2				8				10			
18	(Hungary) Levente Lantos	MF	27	2	5		3				13		2	1	43	2	7	1
19	(Hungary) Zoltán Finta	DF	4				3				8		1		15		1	
19	(Hungary) Szabolcs Gyánó	FW	8	2	1						1	1	1		9	3	2	
20	(Hungary) Gergő Lovrencsics	FW	23	10			2	2			13	2			38	14		
21	(Hungary) Roland Racskó	DF	1								4				5			
22	(Hungary) Béla Koplárovics	MF	22	3	3		2				5		1		29	3	4	
25	(Hungary) Balázs Fónai	MF	22	3	2		2	1			10	1			34	5	2	
26	(Hungary) Benjamin Csorbics																	
26	(Hungary) Balázs Schrancz	MF	13		1						4				17		1	
27	(Hungary) Tamás Szalai	FW	26	8	4		1				11	2			38	10	4	
28	(Hungary) Zoltán Arnold										1				1			
28	(Hungary) Péter Bodó	DF									2				2			
29	(Hungary) Zsolt Kalmár	MF					2	1			7				9	1		
31	(Hungary) Lajos Hegedűs	GK	3			1					7				10			1
31	(Hungary) Gergő János																	
33	(Hungary) Ádám Présinger	DF	11	1	2						5		1		16	1	3	
61	(Hungary) Gábor Simonfalvi	MF	11				3				7				21			
69	(Hungary) Zsolt Horváth	FW	22	6			1				13	10	2		36	16	2	
77	(Hungary) Norbert Szabó	FW	3				2				5				10			
82	(Hungary) Balázs Berdó	MF	28	7	5		2				14	5	3		44	12	8	
85	(Hungary) Tamás Törtei	DF	14		3		2				10	1			26	1	3	
88	(Hungary) Dávid Luczek	MF	2				1				10		1		13		1	
Own goals								1				1				2		
Totals				59	39	2		8	2			34	16	1		101	57	3

=== Hat-tricks ===
No.	Player	Against	Result	Date	Competition	Round
69	(Hungary) Zsolt Horváth	Kaposvár	4–1 (A)	5 November 2008	Ligakupa	Group stage

=== Clean sheets ===
			Clean sheets			
No.	Player	Games Played	Nemzeti Bajnokság II	Magyar Kupa	Ligakupa	Total
1	(Hungary) Roland Herbert	26	10	0		10
31	(Hungary) Lajos Hegedűs	10	2		2	4
16	(Hungary) Csaba Sólyom	10		0	3	3
12	(Hungary) Dénes Dibusz	1	0			0
Totals			12	0	5	17
