= 2009 Ligakupa final =

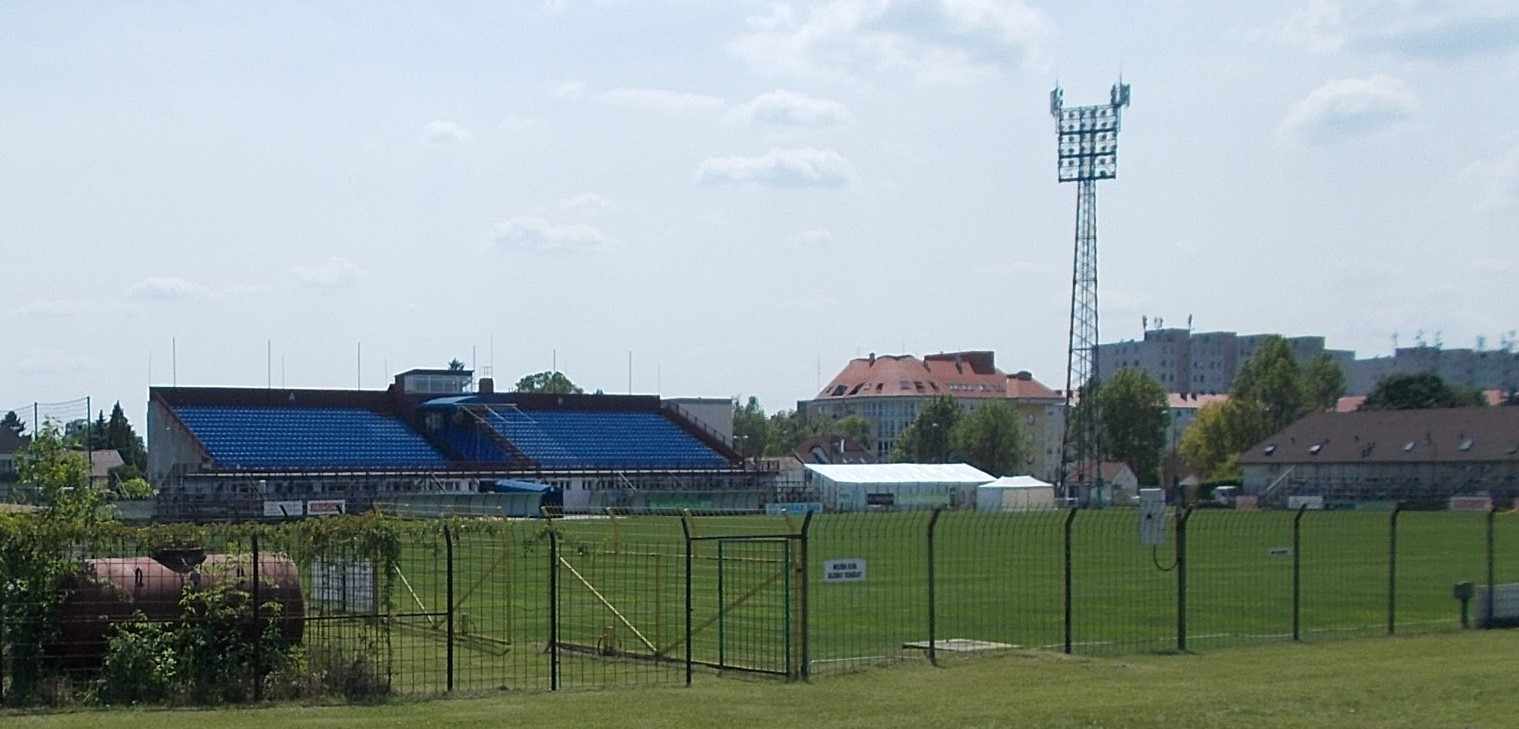
- The Révész Géza utcai Stadion in Siófok hosted the final.
- Event: 2008–09 Ligakupa
Pécs	Fehérvár
1	3
- Date: 13 May 2009
- Venue: Révész Géza utcai Stadion, Siófok
- Referee: Ferenc Bede
- Attendance: 3,000

The 2009 Ligakupa final decided the winners of the 2008–09 Ligakupa, the 2nd season of Hungarian football league cup, the Ligakupa. The match was played on 13 May 2009 at the Révész Géza utcai Stadion in Siófok between Pécs and Fehérvár.

Fehérvár successfully defended their title with a 3–1 victory, securing their second Ligakupa trophy. The club remain, the last team to successfully defend their trophy. The winners also received 20 million forint in prize money, while the runners-up received 10 million forint and an additional 2 million forint as the highest finishing NB II team.

== Background ==
Fehérvár made its second Ligakupa final appearance in history, having won previous year in 2008. For Pécs, this was their first final appearance, additionally the first second division team to reach the final since the creation of the competition and the admission of second-tier teams.

=== Previous finals ===
Team	Previous final appearances (bold indicates winners)
Pécs	None
Fehérvár	1 (**2008**)

== Route to the final ==
Note: In all results below, the score of the finalist is given first (H: home; A: away).

Pécs				Round	Fehérvár			
Opponent	Result			Group stage	Opponent	Result		
Paks	1–0 (A)			Matchday 1	Rákospalota	4–0 (H)		
Zalaegerszeg	2–0 (H)			Matchday 2	Baktalórántháza	2–0 (A)		
Újpest	1–1 (H)			Matchday 3	Ferencváros	0–0 (H)		
Kaposvár	4–1 (A)			Matchday 4	Honvéd	2–2 (H)		
Dunaújváros	3–1 (H)			Matchday 5	Kecskemét	3–2 (A)		
Paks	3–1 (H)			Matchday 6	Rákospalota	4–2 (A)		
Zalaegerszeg	0–0 (A)			Matchday 7	Baktalórántháza	8–0 (H)		
Újpest	0–4 (A)			Matchday 8	Ferencváros	3–2 (A)		
Kaposvár	2–4 (H)			Matchday 9	Honvéd	1–1 (A)		
Dunaújváros	8–2 (A)			Matchday 10	Kecskemét	2–0 (H)		
**Group C runners-up**: Pos / Team / Pld / Pts; 1 / Újpest / 10 / 20; **2** / Pécs / **10** / 20; 3 / Kaposvár / 10 / 19; 4 / Zalaegerszeg / 10 / 13; 5 / Paks / 10 / 11; 6 / Dunaújváros / 10 / 2; Source: HFF				Final standings	**Group D winners**: Pos / Team / Pld / Pts; **1** / Fehérvár / **10** / 24; 2 / Honvéd / 10 / 19; 3 / Ferencváros / 10 / 19; 4 / Kecskemét / 10 / 11; 5 / Rákospalota / 10 / 10; 6 / Baktalórántháza / 10 / 0; Source: HFF			
Opponent	Agg.	1st leg	2nd leg	Knockout phase	Opponent	Agg.	1st leg	2nd leg
Haladás	7–3	3–2 (H)	4–1 (A)	Quarter-finals	Diósgyőr	1–0	0–0 (A)	1–0 (H)
Honvéd	2–0	1–0 (A)	1–0 (H)	Semi-finals	Győr	3–1	2–0 (H)	1–1 (A)

== Match ==
=== Summary ===
Pécs started the game stronger, they had more possession and led dangerous attacks, Dávid Wittrédi got into position several times, and in the ninth minute Zsolt Horváth could have scored the lead for his team, but the midfielder missed from 11 meters. Then, in the 11th minute, Pécs's manager Antal Botos found himself in a very difficult situation. Alves was given a great start, broke inside the penalty area. Levente Lantos came on and stepped on the striker's heel and he fell. Referee Bede awarded a penalty and the Pécs defender was sent off for denying obvious goal scoring opportunity. The penalty was taken by Goran Vujović, who shot the ball under the crossbar, Lajos Hegedűs had no chance to save. This gave Fehérvár the lead. After the goal the Fehérvár side took control of the game, Pécs seemed to be affected by the loss of Lantos and the goal. The high pressure paid off in the 25th minute, Ákos Elek went down the left and tried to shoot, but his attempt was flat to the middle and Vujović came on and scored his and his team's second goal from five meters. After that, however, Pécs woke up, regained more possession and played aggressively, although it did not show in big situations. However, the equalizer was not came until the second half. Dávid Wittrédi, took a free kick from 21 metres from and fired the ball into the top left corner into Zsolt Sebők's net. In the 70th minute it was all decided. Dénes Szakály tried a shot from 25 metres out, but his powerful shot was not caught by Lajos Hegedűs, and the ball fell to Illés Sitku, who stepped on it in a great position and then passed for Dániel Nagy. He crossed to the far post and Alison Silva, who was on his own and came on as a substitute, fired into the bottom right corner from 6 metres. Alison could have added to his tally in the 83rd minute. Dániel Nagy curled a free-kick into the middle and Gábor Horváth headed home from 11 metres, but Hegedűs showed great bravery to push the ball onto the post, but it was straight to Alison, who fired over from 5 metres. Fehérvár won and defended their title.

=== Details ===
13 May 2009
18:00 CEST

Pécs	1–3	Fehérvár
Wittrédi 58'	Report	Vujović 13' (pen.), 26'; Silva 69'

Révész Géza utcai Stadion, Siófok
Attendance: 3,000
Referee: Ferenc Bede

**Pécs**	**Fehérvár**

GK	31	(Hungary) Lajos Hegedűs
DF	5	(Hungary) József Szabados
DF	6	(Hungary) Gábor Kovács
DF	18	(Hungary) Levente Lantos	(red card) 12'
DF	33	(Hungary) Ádám Présinger
MF	7	(Hungary) Dávid Wittrédi
MF	26	(Hungary) Balázs Schrancz		(substituted off) 68'
MF	27	(Hungary) Tamás Szalai
MF	82	(Hungary) Balázs Berdó		(substituted off) 15'
FW	20	(Hungary) Gergő Lovrencsics		(substituted off) 88'
FW	69	(Hungary) Zsolt Horváth		(substituted off) 46'
Substitutes:
GK	1	(Hungary) Roland Herbert
DF	4	(Hungary) József Nagy
DF	8	(Hungary) János Sipos
DF	21	(Hungary) Roland Racskó		(substituted on) 15'
MF	10	(Hungary) Olivér Nagy		(substituted on) 68'
MF	22	(Hungary) Béla Koplárovics	(yellow card) 64'	(substituted on) 46'
MF	25	(Hungary) Balázs Fónai		(substituted on) 88'
Manager:
(Hungary) Antal Botos

GK	1	(Hungary) Zsolt Sebők
DF	2	(Serbia) Marko Anđić	(yellow card) 36'
DF	3	(Hungary) Gábor Horváth II
DF	13	(Montenegro) Ilija Radović
DF	20	(Hungary) Pál Lázár	(yellow card) 39'	(substituted off) 46'
MF	14	(Hungary) Balázs Farkas
MF	15	(Hungary) Dániel Nagy
MF	17	(Hungary) Dénes Szakály		(substituted off) 80'
MF	25	(Hungary) Ákos Elek		(substituted off) 71'
FW	18	(Montenegro) Goran Vujović		(substituted off) 46'
FW	21	(Brazil) André Alves		(substituted off) 60'
Substitutes:
GK	22	(Serbia) Nenad Filipović
DF	4	(Hungary) Dávid Mohl		(substituted on) 46'
DF	5	(Hungary) Ákos Koller
MF	10	(Hungary) Zsolt Dvéri		(substituted on) 80'
MF	26	(Brazil) César Romero		(substituted on) 71'
FW	9	(Hungary) Illés Sitku		(substituted on) 46'
FW	29	(Brazil) Alison Silva		(substituted on) 60'
Manager:
(Hungary) István Varga

Assistant referees:
Tibor Virágh
Zoltán Kovács
Fourth official:
Gábor Oláh
