= 2008–09 Ligakupa =

Tournament details
- Country: Hungary
- Dates: 1 October 2008 – 13 May 2009
- Teams: 24

Final positions
- Champions: Fehérvár (2nd title)
- Runners-up: Pécs

Tournament statistics
- Matches played: 133
- Goals scored: 503 (3.78 per match)
- Top goal scorer(s): Zsolt Horváth (10 goals)

The 2008–09 Ligakupa was the second edition of the Hungarian League Cup, the Ligakupa. The first matches were played on 1 October 2008 and the final was held on 13 May 2009 at the Révész Street Stadium in Siófok.

Fehérvár won a second consecutive title, defeating a second division team, Pécs 3–1 in the final.

== Format ==
Participating teams were from the Nemzeti Bajnokság I and 8 from the Nemzeti Bajnokság II. Each six club in each of the four groups played each other twice, so the regular season was ten rounds, with the final two rounds took place in February. The top two finishers from each group progressed and, following a managed draw (group opponents could only met in the final), started the straight knockout stage. The quarter-finals and semi-finals were two-legged matches, with the winner decided in a single final meeting.

	Clubs entering in this round	Clubs advancing from previous round	Number of games	Main date
Group stage (4 group, 24 clubs)	16 clubs from Nemzeti Bajnokság I; 8 clubs from Nemzeti Bajnokság II	N/A	120	2 October 2008–15 February 2009
Quarter-finals (8 clubs)	No clubs enter the quarter-finals	4 group winners from the group stage; 4 group runners-up from the group stage	8 (two-legged)	3 March 2009–26 March 2009
Semi-finals (4 clubs)	No clubs enter the semi-finals	4 winners from quarter-finals	4 (two-legged)	29 March 2009–9 April 2009
Final (2 clubs)	No clubs enter the final	2 winners from semi-finals	1	13 May 2009

== Group stage ==
=== Group A ===
Pos	Team	Pld	W	D	L	GF	GA	GD	Pts	Qualification	VAS	DIO	DEB	NYI	BOC	VAC
1	Vasas	10	6	3	1	31	14	+17	21	Advance to knockout phase	—	3–0	2–1	4–1	1–1	7–1
2	Diósgyőr	10	6	3	1	22	9	+13	21	Advance to knockout phase	2–2	—	4–1	3–1	5–0	4–1
3	Debrecen	10	3	3	4	22	19	+3	12		3–3	0–0	—	2–1	5–1	4–0
4	Nyíregyháza	10	3	2	5	19	18	+1	11		4–0	1–1	2–2	—	4–0	3–0
5	Bőcs	10	3	1	6	15	27	−12	10		1–5	0–1	3–2	2–0	—	5–0
6	Vác-Újbuda	10	3	0	7	13	35	−22	9		0–4	0–2	3–2	4–2	4–2	—

Source: HFF

==== First round ====
1 October 2008	Vasas	1–1	Bőcs	Budapest
16:00 CEST (UTC+2)	Sowunmi 34'	Report	Török 39'	Stadium: Stadion Rudolf Illovszky; Attendance: 150; Referee: Zoltán J. Kovács

1 October 2008	Nyíregyháza	3–0	Vác-Újbuda	Nyíregyháza
15:00 CEST (UTC+2)	Miskolczi 35'; Cornaci 42'; Dosso 72'	Report		Stadium: Városi Stadion; Attendance: 250; Referee: Ferenc Szöllősi

1 October 2008	Diósgyőr	4–1	Debrecen	Miskolc
18:00 CEST (UTC+2)	Tchana 5'; Szélpál 22'; S. Horváth 36'; Szabó 66'	Report	Kerekes 29'	Stadium: Diósgyőri Stadion; Attendance: 600; Referee: László Varga

==== Second round ====
15 October 2008	Bőcs	0–1	Diósgyőr	Bőcs
15:00 CEST (UTC+2)		Report	Szélpál 156'	Stadium: Bőcs Sportpálya; Attendance: 500; Referee: Róbert Nagy

15 October 2008	Debrecen	2–1	Nyíregyháza	Debrecen
15:30 CEST (UTC+2)	Takács 7'; Omagbemi 16'	Report	Lippai 58'	Stadium: Stadion Oláh Gábor Út; Attendance: 800; Referee: József Erdős

22 October 2008	Vác-Újbuda	0–4	Vasas	Vác
14:00 CEST (UTC+2)		Report	Gyánó 34', 36', 49'; Mundi 85'	Stadium: Stadion Városi Vác; Attendance: 150; Referee: Gergő Király

==== Third round ====
29 October 2008	Nyíregyháza	1–1	Diósgyőr	Nyíregyháza
14:00 CET (UTC+1)	Apostu 36'	Report	Takács 62'	Stadium: Városi Stadion; Attendance: 500; Referee: Gábor Oláh

29 October 2008	Vasas	2–1	Debrecen	Budapest
16:00 CET (UTC+1)	Gyánó 44'; B. Tóth 76'	Report	Szilágyi 67'	Stadium: Stadion Rudolf Illovszky; Attendance: 150; Referee: Ádám Farkas

29 October 2008	Bőcs	5–0	Vác-Újbuda	Bőcs
	Bardi 6', 40'; Vass 45'; Irhás 51'; Tányéros 89' (o.g.)	Report		Stadium: Bőcs Sportpálya; Attendance: 150; Referee: Gábor Bendik

==== Fourth round ====
5 November 2008	Bőcs	2–0	Nyíregyháza	Bőcs
13:30 CET (UTC+1)	Menougong 59', 70'	Report		Stadium: Bőcs Sportpálya; Attendance: 150; Referee: Gergő Király

5 November 2008	Debrecen	4–0	Vác-Újbuda	Debrecen
13:30 CET (UTC+1)	Czvitkovics 16'; Takács 33'; Omagbemi 35'; Vinicius 67'	Report		Stadium: DEAC Stadion; Attendance: 500; Referee: Gábor Fajkusz

5 November 2008	Diósgyőr	2–2	Vasas	Miskolc
16:00 CET (UTC+1)	Sebők 18'; Takács 53'	Report	Gyánó 28'; Kelemen 42'	Stadium: Diósgyőri Stadion; Attendance: 300; Referee: Gergely Szőts

==== Fifth round ====
12 November 2008	Vác-Újbuda	0–2	Diósgyőr	Vác
13:30 CET (UTC+1)		Report	Kamber 70', 73'	Stadium: Stadion Városi Vác; Attendance: 100; Referee: Tibor Gyarmati II

12 November 2008	Bőcs	3–2	Debrecen	Bőcs
13:30 CET (UTC+1)	Vass 68'; Menougong 72'; Molnár 84'	Report	Bogdanović 58', 65'	Stadium: Bőcs Sportpálya; Attendance: 200; Referee: János Takács

12 November 2008	Vasas	4–1	Nyíregyháza	Budapest
16:00 CET (UTC+1)	Laczkó 20'; Gyánó 36', 58'; Piller 47'	Report	Fekete 75'	Stadium: Stadion Rudolf Illovszky; Attendance: 100; Referee: Zsolt Szabó

==== Sixth round ====
22 November 2008	Bőcs	1–5	Vasas	Bőcs
13:00 CET (UTC+1)	Irhás 84'	Report	Dobrić 4'; B. Tóth 20'; Mundi 47', 56'; Piller 69'	Stadium: Bőcs Sportpálya; Attendance: 200; Referee: Roland Veizer

22 November 2008	Vác-Újbuda	4–2	Nyíregyháza	Vác
13:00 CET (UTC+1)	P. Kovács 36', 45'; Rob 65'; Hegedűs 71'	Report	Goia 56'; Szilágyi 79'	Stadium: Stadion Városi Vác; Attendance: 100; Referee: Tamás Arany

22 November 2008	Debrecen	0–0	Diósgyőr	Debrecen
13:30 CET (UTC+1)		Report		Stadium: Stadion Oláh Gábor Út; Attendance: 600; Referee: Zoltán Iványi

==== Seventh round ====
26 November 2008	Nyíregyháza	2–2	Debrecen	Nyíregyháza
13:00 CET (UTC+1)	Dosso 67'; Cornaci 83'	Report	Omagbemi 1'; Bogdanović 13'	Stadium: Városi Stadion; Attendance: 200; Referee: László Varga

29 November 2008	Vasas	7–1	Vác-Újbuda	Budapest
11:00 CET (UTC+1)	Sowunmi 8'; B. Tóth 14', 54', 74'; Laczkó 39'; A. Tóth 58'; Papucsek 62'	Report	Varga 31'	Stadium: Stadion Rudolf Illovszky; Attendance: 76; Referee: Balázs Böcskei

29 November 2008	Diósgyőr	5–0	Bőcs	Miskolc
13:00 CET (UTC+1)	Kamber 18'; Tóth 27', 29', 70'; Honma 60'	Report		Stadium: Diósgyőri Stadion; Attendance: 350; Referee: Péter Pető

==== Eighth round ====
3 December 2008	Debrecen	3–3	Vasas	Debrecen
13:00 CET (UTC+1)	Omagbemi 24', 60'; Bogdanović 25'	Report	Papucsek 2'; Laczkó 17'; A. Tóth 65'	Stadium: Stadion Oláh Gábor Út; Attendance: 82; Referee: Sándor Andó-Szabó

6 December 2008	Diósgyőr	3–1	Nyíregyháza	Miskolc
15:00 CET (UTC+1)	Tóth 32', 85'; Kamber 48'	Report	Simon 68'	Stadium: Diósgyőri Stadion; Attendance: 800; Referee: Ádám Farkas

6 December 2008	Vác-Újbuda	4–2	Bőcs	Vác
	P. Kovács 38'; Hirth 47'; Gáspár 57'; C. Hegedűs 62'	Report	Cséke 24', 52'	Stadium: Stadion Városi Vác; Attendance: 50; Referee: Gábor Fajkusz

==== Ninth round ====
7 February 2009	Nyíregyháza	4–0	Bőcs	Nyíregyháza
		Report		Stadium: Városi Stadion; Attendance: 500

7 February 2009	Vasas	3–0	Diósgyőr	Budapest
		Report		Stadium: Stadion Rudolf Illovszky; Attendance: 400

7 February 2009	Vác-Újbuda	3–2	Debrecen	Vác
		Report		Stadium: Stadion Városi Vác; Attendance: 50

==== Tenth round ====
11 February 2009	Nyíregyháza	4–0	Vasas	Nyíregyháza
13:00 CET (UTC+1)	Kertai 17'; Apostu 26', 27', 39'	Report		Stadium: Városi Stadion; Attendance: 400; Referee: Tibor Gyarmati II

14 February 2009	Diósgyőr	4–1	Vác-Újbuda	Miskolc
15:00 CET (UTC+1)	Stanić 75'; Kamber 76'; Honma 78'; Szabó 82'	Report	Varga 73'	Stadium: Diósgyőri Stadion; Attendance: 1,000; Referee: Eszter Urbán

14 February 2009	Debrecen	5–1	Bőcs	Debrecen
14:30 CET (UTC+1)	Omagbemi 44', 65', 85', 90'; Vinicius 88'	Report	Martis 29'	Stadium: Stadion Oláh Gábor Út; Attendance: 100; Referee: Gábor Fajkusz

=== Group B ===
Pos	Team	Pld	W	D	L	GF	GA	GD	Pts	Qualification	HAL	GYO	MTK	SIO	BUD	PAP
1	Haladás	10	7	1	2	23	10	+13	22	Advance to knockout phase	—	2–0	2–0	3–0	3–0	5–2
2	Győr	10	5	1	4	23	19	+4	16	Advance to knockout phase	4–0	—	1–1	3–0	6–0	0–4
3	MTK	10	4	3	3	13	17	−4	15		0–0	3–0	—	1–8	1–2	2–1
4	Siófok	10	4	2	4	20	16	+4	14		2–1	4–2	1–2	—	1–2	2–2
5	Budaörs	10	3	1	6	10	22	−12	10		2–5	0–1	0–1	0–2	—	3–1
6	Pápa	10	1	4	5	18	23	−5	7		0–2	5–6	2–2	0–0	1–1	—

Source: HFF

==== First round ====
1 October 2008	Győr	4–0	Haladás	Győr
15:30 CEST (UTC+2)	M. Tóth 2'; Brnović 39', 44'; Csermelyi 78'	Report		Stadium: ETO Park; Attendance: 300; Referee: Norbert Kiss

1 October 2008	Siófok	1–2	Budaörs	Siófok
15:30 CEST (UTC+2)	Krizbai 23'	Report	Pálinkás 59'; Tüske 78'	Stadium: Révész Street Stadium; Attendance: 50; Referee: József Erdős

1 October 2008	Pápa	2–2	MTK	Pápa
17:30 CEST (UTC+2)	Germán 45'; Imrik 54'	Report	Bajúsz 61'; Nikházi 65'	Stadium: Stadion Várkerti; Attendance: 500; Referee: Tamás Arany

==== Second round ====
15 October 2008	Budaörs	0–1	Győr	Budaörs
14:00 CEST (UTC+2)		Report	Lappints 53'	Stadium: Árok utcai Stadion; Attendance: 150; Referee: Gábor Kovács

15 October 2008	MTK	1–8	Siófok	Budapest
15:00 CEST (UTC+2)	Nikházi 72'	Report	Takács 4'; Magasföldi 35', 41'; Ndjodo 44'; Fülöp 49', 80'; Gajda 52', 75'	Stadium: Hidegkuti Nándor Stadion; Attendance: 150; Referee: Gergely Szőts

15 October 2008	Haladás	5–2	Pápa	Szombathely
15:00 CEST (UTC+2)	Balassa 24'; Skriba 34'; Andorka 61'; Schimmer 75'; Major 90+2'	Report	Fehér 39'; Nyári 85'	Stadium: Rohonci Street Stadium; Attendance: 600; Referee: Gábor Oláh

==== Third round ====
29 October 2008	Győr	1–1	MTK	Győr
	Brnović 52'	Report	Ladányi 74'	Stadium: ETO Park; Attendance: 300; Referee: Krisztián Pánczél

29 October 2008	Haladás	3–0	Budaörs	Szombathely
		Report		Stadium: Rohonci Street Stadium; Attendance: 400

26 November 2008	Siófok	2–2	Pápa	Siófok
		Report		Stadium: Révész Street Stadium; Attendance: 150

==== Fourth round ====
19 November 2008	Siófok	2–1	Haladás	Siófok
13:00 CET (UTC+1)	Magasföldi 32'; Ndjodo 44'	Report	Andorka 24'	Stadium: Révész Street Stadium; Attendance: 100; Referee: Ádám Németh

5 November 2008	MTK	1–2	Budaörs	Budapest
13:30 CET (UTC+1)	Nikházi 45'	Report	Farkas 23'; D. Varga 34'	Stadium: Hidegkuti Nándor Stadion; Attendance: 100; Referee: Gyöngyi Gaál

19 November 2008	Pápa	5–6	Győr	Pápa
17:00 CET (UTC+1)	Farkas 12'; Szabó 13'; Venczel 42', 86'; Alex 51'	Report	Z. Kovács I 2', 8', 55', 59', 82'; Bajzát 56'	Stadium: Stadion Várkerti; Attendance: 200; Referee: Tibor Gyarmati II

==== Fifth round ====
12 November 2008	Győr	3–0	Siófok	Győr
		Report		Stadium: ETO Park; Attendance: 300

12 November 2008	Haladás	2–0	MTK	Szombathely
	N. Tóth 23'; Maikel 44'	Report		Stadium: Rohonci Street Stadium; Attendance: 300; Referee: Tamás Arany

3 December 2008	Budaörs	3–1	Pápa	Budaörs
		Report		Stadium: Városi Stadion; Attendance: 100

==== Sixth round ====
22 November 2008	Budaörs	0–2	Siófok	Budaörs
		Report		Stadium: Városi Stadion; Attendance: 100

23 November 2008	Haladás	2–0	Győr	Szombathely
		Report		Stadium: Rohonci Street Stadium; Attendance: 400

23 November 2008	MTK	2–1	Pápa	Budapest
	Szekeres 80'; Gál 87'	Report	Gyömbér 72'	Stadium: Promontor utcai Stadion; Attendance: 50; Referee: Ádám Farkas

==== Seventh round ====
29 November 2008	Siófok	1–2	MTK	Siófok
	Tusori 57'	Report	Rodenbücher 50'; Kis 70'	Stadium: Révész Street Stadium; Attendance: 150; Referee: József Berger

29 November 2008	Győr	6–0	Budaörs	Győr
		Report		Stadium: ETO Park; Attendance: 300

29 November 2008	Pápa	0–2	Haladás	Pápa
		Report		Stadium: Stadion Várkerti; Attendance: 400

==== Eighth round ====
6 December 2008	MTK	3–0	Győr	Budapest
	Hrepka 35'; Hidvégi 53'; Gosztonyi 84'	Report		Stadium: Promontor utcai Stadion; Attendance: 100; Referee: Róbert Nagy

6 December 2008	Pápa	0–0	Siófok	Pápa
		Report		Stadium: Stadion Várkerti; Attendance: 300

6 December 2008	Budaörs	2–5	Haladás	Budaörs
		Report		Stadium: Városi Stadion; Attendance: 250

==== Ninth round ====
7 February 2009	Haladás	3–0	Siófok	Szombathely
		Report		Stadium: Rohonci Street Stadium; Attendance: 200

7 February 2009	Győr	0–4	Pápa	Győr
		Report		Stadium: ETO Park; Attendance: 150

7 February 2009	Budaörs	0–1	MTK	Budaörs
		Report	Könyves 72'	Stadium: Városi Stadion; Attendance: 200; Referee: László Varga

==== Tenth round ====
22 January 2009	MTK	0–0	Haladás	Budapest
13:00 CET (UTC+1)		Report		Stadium: Promontor utcai Stadion; Attendance: 100; Referee: Gergő Király

14 February 2009	Siófok	4–2	Győr	Siófok
13:00 CET (UTC+1)	Ndjodo 31'; Tóth 53' (o.g.); Magasföldi 54'; Koós 83'	Report	Csermelyi 16'; Berde 27'	Stadium: Révész Street Stadium; Attendance: 150; Referee: Gyöngyi Gaál

14 February 2009	Pápa	1–1	Budaörs	Pápa
	Alex 56'	Report	J. Farkas 61'	Stadium: Stadion Várkerti; Attendance: 150; Referee: Gergő Király

=== Group C ===
Pos	Team	Pld	W	D	L	GF	GA	GD	Pts	Qualification	UJP	PEC	KAP	ZAL	PAK	DUN
1	Újpest	10	6	2	2	25	15	+10	20	Advance to knockout phase	—	4–0	2–4	2–1	0–0	5–1
2	Pécs	10	6	2	2	24	14	+10	20	Advance to knockout phase	1–1	—	2–4	2–0	3–1	3–1
3	Kaposvár	10	6	1	3	26	20	+6	19		2–4	1–4	—	1–0	2–1	2–2
4	Zalaegerszeg	10	4	1	5	15	15	0	13		2–3	0–0	0–5	—	3–1	5–0
5	Paks	10	3	2	5	17	14	+3	11		3–1	0–1	4–0	0–2	—	2–2
6	Dunaújváros	10	0	2	8	11	40	−29	2		1–3	2–8	1–5	1–2	0–5	—

Source: HFF

==== First round ====
1 October 2008	Paks	0–1	Pécs	Paks
14:30 CEST (UTC+2)		Report	Lovrencsics 63'	Stadium: Fehérvári úti Stadion; Attendance: 150; Referee: Gergely Sulyok

1 October 2008	Kaposvár	2–4	Újpest	Kaposvár
16:00 CEST (UTC+2)	Reszli 24'; Tabi 78'	Report	Kéthévoama 14'; Lázár 29'; Szabó 35', 60'	Stadium: Rákóczi Stadion; Attendance: 200; Referee: Krisztián Pánczél

1 October 2008	Zalaegerszeg	5–0	Dunaújváros	Zalaegerszeg
18:00 CEST (UTC+2)	Trnavac 7', 72'; Pekič 30'; Alomerović 61'; Balogh 90'	Report		Stadium: ZTE Arena; Attendance: 300; Referee: Balázs Böcskei

==== Second round ====
14 October 2008	Újpest	0–0	Paks	Budapest
19:00 CEST (UTC+2)		Report		Stadium: Szusza Ferenc Stadium; Attendance: 1,000; Referee: László Varga

15 October 2008	Dunaújváros	1–5	Kaposvár	Dunaújváros
14:30 CEST (UTC+2)	Simpson 37'	Report	Ato 47', 59', 78'; Jovánczai 66'; Kerekes 75'	Stadium: Dunaferr Arena; Attendance: 300; Referee: Ferenc Szöllősi

15 October 2008	Pécs	2–0	Zalaegerszeg	Pécs
17:00 CEST (UTC+2)	Wittrédi 21'; Z. Horváth 24'	Report		Stadium: Stadion PMFC; Attendance: 400; Referee: Csaba Pintér

==== Third round ====
29 October 2008	Paks	2–2	Dunaújváros	Paks
		Report		Stadium: Fehérvári úti Stadion; Attendance: 120

29 October 2008	Kaposvár	1–0	Zalaegerszeg	Kaposvár
		Report		Stadium: Rákóczi Stadion; Attendance: 100

29 October 2008	Pécs	1–1	Újpest	Pécs
		.		Stadium: Stadion PMFC; Attendance: 600

==== Fourth round ====
5 November 2008	Kaposvár	1–4	Pécs	Kaposvár
		Report		Stadium: Rákóczi Stadion; Attendance: 150

5 November 2008	Zalaegerszeg	3–1	Paks	Zalaegerszeg
		Report		Stadium: ZTE Arena; Attendance: 400

5 November 2008	Dunaújváros	1–3	Újpest	Dunaújváros
		Report		Stadium: Dunaferr Arena; Attendance: 300; Referee: József Berger

==== Fifth round ====
12 November 2008	Paks	4–0	Kaposvár	Paks
		Report		Stadium: Atomerőmű Sporttelep; Attendance: 120

12 November 2008	Újpest	2–1	Zalaegerszeg	Budapest
		Report		Stadium: Szusza Ferenc Stadium; Attendance: 300

19 November 2008	Pécs	3–1	Dunaújváros	Pécs
		Report		Stadium: Stadion PMFC; Attendance: 300

==== Sixth round ====
22 November 2008	Pécs	3–1	Paks	Pécs
	Berdó 63'; Wittrédi 81' (pen.); Horváth 90'	Report	Tamási 43'	Stadium: Stadion PMFC; Attendance: 250; Referee: József Berger

22 November 2008	Újpest	2–4	Kaposvár	Budapest
		Report		Stadium: Szusza Ferenc Stadium; Attendance: 500

22 November 2008	Dunaújváros	1–2	Zalaegerszeg	Dunaújváros
		Report		Stadium: Dunaferr Arena; Attendance: 100

==== Seventh round ====
29 November 2008	Kaposvár	2–2	Dunaújváros	Kaposvár
13:00 CET (UTC+1)	Nikolić 30'; Božović 83'	Report	I. Nagy 26', 27'	Stadium: Cseri úti Sporttelep; Attendance: 200; Referee: Szabolcs Szilasi

29 November 2008	Paks	3–1	Újpest	Paks
15:00 CET (UTC+1)	Kiss 47', 90'; Heffler 76'	Report	Kéthévoama 25'	Stadium: Fehérvári úti Stadion; Attendance: 150; Referee: Tamás Arany

29 November 2008	Zalaegerszeg	0–0	Pécs	Zalaegerszeg
13:00 CET (UTC+1)		Report		Stadium: ZTE Arena; Attendance: 100; Referee: Csaba Pintér

==== Eighth round ====
26 November 2008	Zalaegerszeg	0–5	Kaposvár	Zalaegerszeg
13:00 CET (UTC+1)		Report	Nikolić 6'; Božović 35', 53'; Balogh 64'; Kerekes 81'	Stadium: ZTE Arena; Attendance: 200; Referee: Dávid Ákos

6 December 2008	Dunaújváros	0–5	Paks	Dunaújváros
13:00 CET (UTC+1)		Report	Heffler 48'; Buzás 55', 58'; Pap 86'; Márkus 89'	Stadium: Dunaferr Arena; Attendance: 100; Referee: Balázs Böcskei

7 December 2008	Újpest	4–0	Pécs	Budapest
13:00 CET (UTC+1)	Lipták 27'; Kéthévoama 56'; A. Simon 67'; Remili 71'	Report		Stadium: Szusza Ferenc Stadium; Referee: Zoltán Iványi

==== Ninth round ====
7 December 2008	Újpest	5–1	Dunaújváros	Budapest
19:00 CET (UTC+1)	Tisza 14'; Božić 20'; Rajczi 24'; Kabát 39'; A. Simon 88'	Report	Marques 34'	Stadium: Szusza Ferenc Stadium; Attendance: 800; Referee: Balázs Böcskei

8 February 2009	Pécs	2–4	Kaposvár	Pécs
14:00 CET (UTC+1)	Szalai 11'; Szabados 57'	Report	Farkas 65', 90'; Reszli 83'; Nikolić 85'	Stadium: Stadion PMFC; Attendance: 300; Referee: Berger József

11 February 2009	Paks	0–2	Zalaegerszeg	Székesfehérvár
13:00 CET (UTC+1)		Report	Alomerović 31'; Pavićević 75'	Stadium: Sóstói Stadion; Attendance: 50; Referee: Szabolcs Szilasi

==== Tenth round ====
11 February 2009	Dunaújváros	2–8	Pécs	Kaposvár
	Sukore 50'; Czár 71'	Report	Z. Horváth 23', 76'; Berdó 25', 36'; Törtei 42'; Wittrédi 47'; J. Nagy 77'; Fónai 82'	Stadium: Cseri úti Sporttelep; Attendance: 50; Referee: Sándor Andó-Szabó

14 February 2009	Kaposvár	2–1	Paks	Kaposvár
13:00 CET (UTC+1)	Nikolić 18', 34'	Report	Pintér 29'	Stadium: Rákóczi Stadion; Attendance: 100; Referee: István Vad

14 February 2009	Zalaegerszeg	2–3	Újpest	Zalaegerszeg
15:00 CET (UTC+1)	Balázs 59'; Waltner 90+3'	Report	Kabát 10', 68'; Kéthévoama 90'	Stadium: ZTE Arena; Attendance: 300; Referee: Zsolt Szabó

=== Group D ===
Pos	Team	Pld	W	D	L	GF	GA	GD	Pts	Qualification	FEH	HON	FER	KEC	RAK	BAK
1	Fehérvár	10	7	3	0	29	9	+20	24	Advance to knockout phase	—	2–2	0–0	2–0	4–0	8–0
2	Honvéd	10	5	4	1	33	16	+17	19	Advance to knockout phase	1–1	—	2–2	5–3	8–1	5–1
3	Ferencváros	10	5	4	1	20	10	+10	19		2–3	2–2	—	2–1	3–0	3–0
4	Kecskemét	10	3	2	5	22	17	+5	11		2–3	2–3	0–0	—	2–2	4–0
5	Rákospalota	10	3	1	6	14	28	−14	10		2–4	1–0	2–3	0–3	—	4–1
6	Baktalórántháza	10	0	0	10	3	41	−38	0		0–2	1–5	0–3	0–5	0–2	—

Source: HFF

==== First round ====
1 October 2008	Kecskemét	2–3	Honvéd	Kecskemét
17:00 CEST (UTC+2)	Savić 11'; Kormos 69'	Report	Stojaković 10'; Dobos 37'; Arsenijević 61'	Stadium: Széktói Stadion; Attendance: 600; Referee: Gábor Péter Kovács

1 October 2008	Fehérvár	4–0	Rákospalota	Székesfehérvár
17:00 CEST (UTC+2)	Kulcsár 15', 19'; Disztl 21'; Nagy 67'	Report		Stadium: Sóstói Stadion; Attendance: 300; Referee: Gábor Oláh

1 October 2008	Baktalórántháza	0–3	Ferencváros	Baktalórántháza
15:30 CEST (UTC+2)		Report	Szalai 19'; Kourouma 50'; Bartholomew 85'	Stadium: Városi Stadion; Attendance: 500; Referee: Zoltán Iványi

==== Second round ====
15 October 2008	Baktalórántháza	0–2	Fehérvár	Baktalórántháza
15:00 CEST (UTC+2)		Report	Lattenstein 51'; Disztl 64'	Stadium: Városi Stadion; Attendance: 100; Referee: Gábor Fajkusz

15 October 2008	Rákospalota	0–3	Kecskemét	Budapest
16:00 CEST (UTC+2)		Report	Alempijević 58'; Disney 60'; Nagy 69'	Stadium: Stadion Budai II. Laszló; Attendance: 100; Referee: Ádám Farkas

15 October 2008	Honvéd	2–2	Ferencváros	Budapest
17:30 CEST (UTC+2)	Hercegfalvi 24'; Moreira 90+2'	Report	Downing 18'; Bartholomew 74'	Stadium: Bozsik Stadion; Attendance: 1,000; Referee: Tamás Arany

==== Third round ====
29 October 2008	Kecskemét	4–0	Baktalórántháza	Kecskemét
		Report		Stadium: Széktói Stadion; Attendance: 150

29 October 2008	Fehérvár	0–0	Ferencváros	Székesfehérvár
		Report		Stadium: Sóstói Stadion; Attendance: 1,500; Referee: Ádám Németh

29 October 2008	Honvéd	8–1	Rákospalota	Budapest
18:00 CET (UTC+1)	Kocsis 4', 45'; Gebro 25'; Simić 30'; Arsenijević 56', 86'; Rigonato 63', 90'	Report	Lisztes 3'	Stadium: Bozsik Stadion; Attendance: 200; Referee: László Varga

==== Fourth round ====
5 November 2008	Fehérvár	2–2	Honvéd	Székesfehérvár
17:00 CET (UTC+1)	Mohl 26'; Disztl 79'	Report	Dieng 67'; Arsenijević 71'	Stadium: Sóstói Stadion; Attendance: 150; Referee: János Takács

5 November 2008	Baktalórántháza	0–2	Rákospalota	Baktalórántháza
13:30 CET (UTC+1)		Report	Dancs 62', 83'	Stadium: Városi Stadion; Attendance: 100; Referee: Róbert Nagy

6 November 2008	Ferencváros	2–1	Kecskemét	Budapest
18:00 CET (UTC+1)	Pisanjuk 13'; Brettschneider 70'	Report	Nagy 3'	Stadium: Stadion Albert Flórián; Attendance: 400; Referee: Mihály Fábián

==== Fifth round ====
11 November 2008	Baktalórántháza	1–5	Honvéd	Baktalórántháza
13:30 CET (UTC+1)	Illés 13'	Report	Arsenijević 7', 33'; Dieng 20'; Ivancsics 39', 60'	Stadium: Városi Stadion; Attendance: 100; Referee: Zoltán Iványi

12 November 2008	Kecskemét	2–3	Fehérvár	Kecskemét
		Report		Stadium: Széktói Stadion; Attendance: 100

12 November 2008	Rákospalota	2–3	Ferencváros	Budapest
	Sallai 28'; Kapcsos 81'	Report	Kamaté 16'; Pisanjuk 42'; Brettschneider 49'	Stadium: Stadion Budai II. Laszló; Attendance: 500; Referee: István Mészáros

==== Sixth round ====
22 November 2008	Honvéd	5–3	Kecskemét	Budapest
17:00 CET (UTC+1)	Stojaković 11'; Hercegfalvi 49', 68', 82'; Filó 84'	Report	Hegedűs 57'; Kormos 65', 67'	Stadium: Bozsik Stadion; Attendance: 200; Referee: Tamás Bognár

22 November 2008	Ferencváros	3–0	Baktalórántháza	Budapest
	Brettschneider 16'; Baranyai 49'; Fülöp 76'	Report		Stadium: Stadion Albert Flórián; Attendance: 300; Referee: Krisztián Pánczél

3 December 2008	Rákospalota	2–4	Fehérvár	Budapest
		Report		Stadium: Stadion Budai II. Laszló; Attendance: 50

==== Seventh round ====
29 November 2008	Fehérvár	8–0	Baktalórántháza	Székesfehérvár
		Report		Stadium: Sóstói Stadion; Attendance: 100

29 November 2008	Kecskemét	2–2	Rákospalota	Kecskemét
13:00 CET (UTC+1)		Report		Stadium: Műkertvárosi Sportcentrum; Attendance: 200; Referee: Zoltán Iványi

30 November 2008	Ferencváros	2–2	Honvéd	Budapest
17:30 CET (UTC+1)	Deme 24'; Kamaté 59'	Report	Moreira 6'; Diego 33'	Stadium: Stadion Albert Flórián; Attendance: 500; Referee: Zsolt Szabó

==== Eighth round ====
2 December 2008	Baktalórántháza	0–5	Kecskemét	Baktalórántháza
13:30 CET (UTC+1)		Report	Menyhárt 42'; Montvai 44', 51'; Sándor 81'; S. Nagy 89'	Stadium: Városi Stadion; Attendance: 100; Referee: Roland Veizer

6 December 2008	Ferencváros	2–3	Fehérvár	Budapest
12:00 CET (UTC+1)	Nyilasi 75'; Tóth 79'	Report	Nagy 16', 43'; Horváth 34'	Stadium: Stadion Albert Flórián; Attendance: 300; Referee: Szabolcs Szilasi

6 December 2008	Rákospalota	1–0	Honvéd	Budapest
13:00 CET (UTC+1)	Kapcsos 65'	Report		Stadium: Stadion Budai II. Laszló; Referee: Ádám Németh

==== Ninth round ====
7 February 2009	Honvéd	1–1	Fehérvár	Budapest
15:00 CET (UTC+1)	Arsenijević 38'	Report	Sitku 23'	Stadium: Bozsik Stadion; Attendance: 400; Referee: Zoltán Iványi

7 February 2009	Rákospalota	4–1	Baktalórántháza	Szigetszentmiklós
14:00 CET (UTC+1)	Torma 37', 67'; Kapcsos 39'; Varga 52'	Report	Marics 25'	Stadium: Szigetszentmiklósi Sporttelep; Attendance: 150; Referee: Mihály Fábián

8 February 2009	Kecskemét	0–0	Ferencváros	Kecskemét
17:30 CET (UTC+1)		Report		Stadium: Széktói Stadion; Attendance: 1,300; Referee: Ferenc Bede

==== Tenth round ====
14 February 2009	Fehérvár	2–0	Kecskemét	Székesfehérvár
14:00 CET (UTC+1)	D. Nagy 66'; Koller 81'	Report		Stadium: Sóstói Stadion; Attendance: 100; Referee: Tamás Bognár

14 February 2009	Honvéd	5–1	Baktalórántháza	Budapest
13:00 CET (UTC+1)	Guié 50', 81'; Dieng 58'; Arsenijević 62'; Smiljanić 67'	Report	Illés 41'	Stadium: Bozsik Stadion; Attendance: 300; Referee: Katalin Kulcsár

15 February 2009	Ferencváros	3–0	Rákospalota	Budapest
17:30 CET (UTC+1)	Dragóner 18'; Kamaté 60'; Tóth 89'	Report		Stadium: Stadion Albert Flórián; Attendance: 600; Referee: Roland Veizer

== Knockout phase ==
Quarter-finals
Honvéd	5	0	5
Vasas	1	0	1
Pécs	3	4	7
Haladás	2	1	3
Diósgyőr	0	0	0
Fehérvár	0	1	1
Győr	3	2	5
Újpest	2	1	3

Semi-finals
Honvéd	0	0	0
Pécs	1	1	2
Fehérvár	2	1	3
Győr	0	1	1

Final
Pécs	1
Fehérvár	3

=== Quarter-finals ===
==== Summary ====
Team 1	Agg.	Team 2	1st leg	2nd leg
Diósgyőr	0–1	Fehérvár	0–0	0–1
Pécs	7–3	Haladás	3–2	4–1
Győr	5–3	Újpest	3–2	2–1
Honvéd	5–1	Vasas	5–1	0–0

3 March 2009
16:30 CET (UTC+1)

Diósgyőr	0–0	Fehérvár
	Report

Diósgyőri Stadion, Miskolc
Attendance: 800
Referee: János Takács
25 March 2009
17:00 CET (UTC+1)

Fehérvár	1–0	Diósgyőr
G. Horváth 71'	Report

Sóstói Stadion, Székesfehérvár
Attendance: 150
Referee: Ádám Németh

Fehérvár won 1–0 on aggregate.

4 March 2009
17:00 CET (UTC+1)

Pécs	3–2	Haladás
G. Kovács 75'; Z. Horváth 84'; Berdó 90+2'	Report	Kenesei 44'; Kuttor 47'

Stadion PMFC, Pécs
Attendance: 600
Referee: István Mészáros
17 March 2009
17:00 CET (UTC+1)

Haladás	1–4	Pécs
Andorka 49'	Report	O. Nagy 10'; Szalai 22'; Lovrencsics 70'; Kulcsár 80'

Rohonci Street Stadium, Szombathely
Attendance: 800
Referee: Gergely Sulyok

Pécs won 7–3 on aggregate.

4 March 2009
14:30 CET (UTC+1)

Győr	3–2	Újpest
Pákolicz 25'; M. Kiss 27'; Aleksidze 88'	Report	A. Simon 51'; Popovics 85'

ETO Park, Győr
Attendance: 600
Referee: Viktor Kassai
26 March 2009
18:00 CET (UTC+1)

Újpest	1–2	Győr
Kabát 82'	Report	Bicák 15'; Sánta 45'

Szusza Ferenc Stadium, Budapest
Attendance: 1,000
Referee: Szabolcs Szilasi

Győr won 5–3 on aggregate.

5 March 2009
18:00 CET (UTC+1)

Honvéd	5–1	Vasas
Stojaković 35'; Arsenijević 62'; Guié 71', 79'; Dobos 77'	Report	Sowunmi 27'

Bozsik Stadion, Budapest
Attendance: 300
Referee: Szabolcs Szilasi
25 March 2009
17:00 CET (UTC+1)

Vasas	0–0	Honvéd
	Report

Stadion Rudolf Illovszky, Budapest
Attendance: 300
Referee: Gyöngyi Gaál

Budapest Honvéd won 5–1 on aggregate.

=== Semi-finals ===
==== Summary ====
Team 1	Agg.	Team 2	1st leg	2nd leg
Honvéd	0–2	Pécs	0–1	0–1
Fehérvár	3–1	Győr	2–0	1–1

29 March 2009
17:30 CEST (UTC+2)

Honvéd	0–1	Pécs
	Report	Berdó 82'

Bozsik Stadion, Budapest
Attendance: 500
Referee: Ádám Farkas
9 April 2009
18:00 CEST (UTC+2)

Pécs	1–0	Honvéd
Gyánó 59'	Report

Stadion PMFC, Pécs
Attendance: 2,000
Referee: István Vad

Pécs won 2–0 on aggregate.

29 March 2009
17:30 CEST (UTC+2)

Fehérvár	2–0	Győr
Radović 64'; Alves 80'	Report

Sóstói Stadion, Székesfehérvár
Attendance: 200
Referee: Ferenc Bede
8 April 2009
18:00 CEST (UTC+2)

Győr	1–1	Fehérvár
Copa 46'	Report	Alves 61'

ETO Park, Győr
Attendance: 2,500
Referee: Sándor Andó-Szabó

Fehérvár won 3–1 on aggregate.

=== Final ===
13 May 2009
18:00 CEST (UTC+2)

Pécs	1–3	Fehérvár
Wittrédi 58'	Report	Vujović 13' (pen.), 26'; Silva 69'

Révész Street Stadium, Siófok
Attendance: 3,000
Referee: Ferenc Bede
