= Balázs Schrancz =

Hungarian footballer (born 1977)

Personal information
- Date of birth: 7 August 1977 (age 49)
- Place of birth: Budapest, Hungary
- Height: 1.83 m (6 ft 0 in)
- Position: Midfielder

Youth career
- Ferencváros

Senior career*
Years	Team	Apps	(Gls)
- Ferencváros
- Baracska
- Dabas
- Optik Rathenow
- Dabas
- Olympia Laupheim
2005	Nyíregyháza	7	(0)
2005–2006	APOP Kinyras		
2006–2007	Honvéd	28	(3)
2007	Rákospalota	13	(0)
2007–2008	Felcsút	15	(5)
2008–2009	Pápa	26	(4)
2009	Pécs	13	(0)
2009–2010	Vecsés	9	(1)
2010	Szigetszentmiklós	12	(2)
2010–2011	Törtel	29	(11)
2011–2014	Nagykőrös	84	(31)
2014–2017	Kirnberg		
2017–2020	Csépa	62	(19)
2020–2021	Bodon Péter	15	(10)
2021–2024	Petőfibánya	48	(11)
- * Club domestic league appearances and goals

Balázs Schrancz (born 7 August 1977) is a Hungarian former professional footballer who last played for Petőfibánya.

== Club career ==
On 29 July 2007, Schrancz left Nemzeti Bajnokság I club Rákospalota with his teammate Sándor Török, to join Felcsút in the Nemzeti Bajnokság II.

He changed teams in mid season, to join Pápa in the same division.

On 23 January 2009, Schrancz transferred to fellow Nemzeti Bajnokság II club Pécs, who were aiming for promotion. He started in the 2009 Ligakupa final against Fehérvár on 13 May, which Pécs lost 3–1 at the Révész Géza utcai Stadion.

Schrancz played the entirety of Nagykőrös's Pest County Cup final victory over Diósd on 10 June 2012 at the Stadion Albert Flórián.

== Socca ==
He was the manager of the Hungary national socca team at the 2019 and 2022 World Cups. Following the bad results at the 2023 World Cup, Schrancz was replaced by Roni Ribeiro.

== Career statistics ==
Appearances and goals by club, season and competition
Club	Season	League			National cup (Note: Includes Magyar Kupa)		League cup (Note: Includes Ligakupa)		Other		Total	
Club	Season	Division	Apps	Goals	Apps	Goals	Apps	Goals	Apps	Goals	Apps	Goals
Nyíregyháza	2004–05	Nemzeti Bajnokság I	7	0	—		—		—		7	0
Honvéd	2005–06	Nemzeti Bajnokság I	14	2	4	1	—		—		18	3
Honvéd	2006–07	Nemzeti Bajnokság I	14	1	3	0	—		—		17	1
Honvéd	Total		28	3	7	1	—		—		35	4
Rákospalota	2006–07	Nemzeti Bajnokság I	13	0	—		—		—		13	0
Felcsút	2007–08	Nemzeti Bajnokság II	15	5	2	2	—		—		17	7
Pápa	2007–08	Nemzeti Bajnokság II	11	1	—		—		—		11	1
Pápa	2008–09	Nemzeti Bajnokság II	15	3	5	1	—		—		20	4
Pápa	Total		26	4	5	1	—		—		31	5
Pécs	2008–09	Nemzeti Bajnokság II	13	0	—		4	0	—		17	0
Vecsés	2009–10	Nemzeti Bajnokság II	9	1	1	0	—		—		10	1
Szigetszentmiklós	2009–10	Nemzeti Bajnokság II	12	2	—		—		—		12	2
Törtel	2010–11	Megyei Bajnokság I	29	11	2	2	—		5 (Note: Appearances in Pest County Cup)	5	36	18
Nagykőrös	2011–12	Megyei Bajnokság I	30	16	2	1	—		5	3	37	20
Nagykőrös	2012–13	Nemzeti Bajnokság III	26	7	1	0	—		3	0	30	7
Nagykőrös	2013–14	Megyei Bajnokság I	28	8	2	1	—		2	0	32	9
Nagykőrös	Total		84	31	5	2	—		10	3	99	36
Csépa	2017–18	Megyei Bajnokság I	23	6	—		—		—		23	6
Csépa	2018–19	Megyei Bajnokság I	28	11	—		—		—		28	11
Csépa	2019–20	Megyei Bajnokság II	11	2	—		—		—		11	2
Csépa	Total		62	19	—		—		—		62	19
Bodon Péter	2020–21	Megyei Bajnokság III	15	10	—		—		—		15	10
Petőfibánya	2021–22	Megyei Bajnokság III	13	3	—		—		—		13	3
Petőfibánya	2022–23	Megyei Bajnokság II	18	7	—		—		1 (Note: Appearance in Heves County Cup)	0	19	7
Petőfibánya	2023–24	Megyei Bajnokság I	17	1	—		—		—		17	1
Petőfibánya	Total		48	11	—		—		1	0	49	11
Career total			361	97	22	8	4	0	16	8	403	113

== Honours ==
Honvéd

- Magyar Kupa: 2006–07

Pécs

- Ligakupa runner-up: 2008–09

Nagykőrös

- Pest County Cup: 2012
