= Lajos Hegedűs =

Hungarian footballer

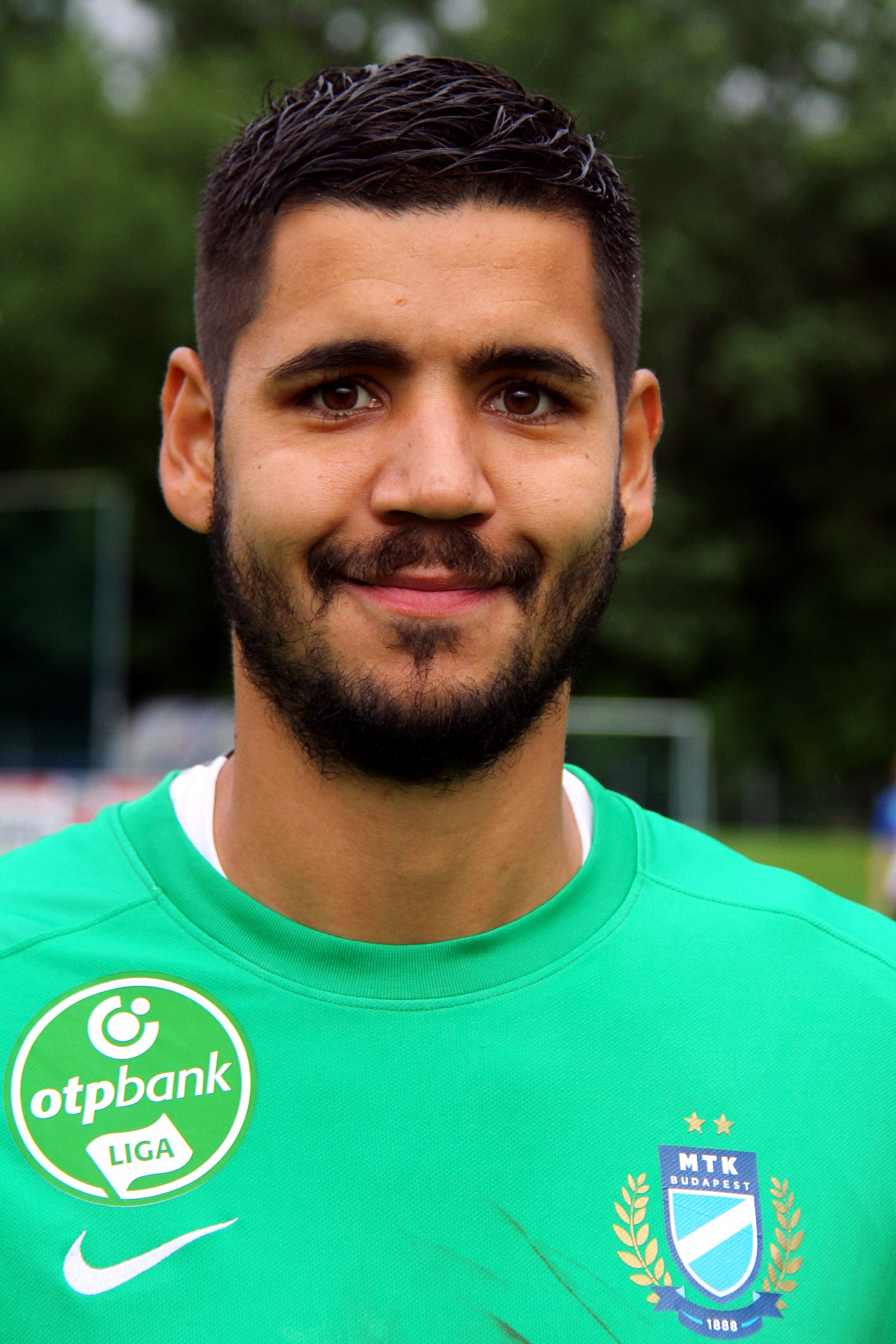
- Hegedűs with MTK Budapest in 2016

Personal information
- Date of birth: 19 December 1987 (age 38)
- Place of birth: Budapest, Hungary
- Height: 1.92 m (6 ft 4 in)
- Position: Goalkeeper

Youth career
- 1996–2000: Ferencváros
- 2000–2006: MTK Budapest

Senior career*
| Years | Team | Apps | (Gls) |
| 2006–2016 | MTK Budapest | 148 | (0) |
| 2006–2009 | → Siófok (loan) | 54 | (0) |
| 2009–2010 | → Pécs (loan) | 30 | (0) |
| 2016–2020 | Puskás Akadémia | 104 | (1) |
| 2020–2021 | Paks | 19 | (0) |
| 2021–2022 | Nyíregyháza | 6 | (0) |
| 2022 | Szolnok | 16 | (0) |
| 2022–2023 | Dunaújváros | 18 | (0) |
| 2023 | Nyíregyháza | 9 | (0) |
- * Club domestic league appearances and goals

Lajos Hegedűs (born 19 December 1987) is a Hungarian former football goalkeeper. In 2020, he was called up in the Hungary national team without making any appearances.

== Career statistics ==
Appearances and goals by club, season and competition
| Club | Season | League | | | Cup | | League Cup | | Europe | | Total | |
| Club | Season | Division | Apps | Goals | Apps | Goals | Apps | Goals | Apps | Goals | Apps | Goals |
|---|---|---|---|---|---|---|---|---|---|---|---|---|
Siófok
| Siófok | 2006–07 | Nemzeti Bajnokság II | 26 | 0 | 0 | 0 | — | | — | | 26 | 0 |
| Siófok | 2007–08 | Nemzeti Bajnokság I | 28 | 0 | 0 | 0 | 2 | 0 | — | | 30 | 0 |
| Siófok | 2008–09 | Nemzeti Bajnokság I | 0 | 0 | 3 | 0 | 8 | 0 | — | | 11 | 0 |
| Siófok | Total | | 54 | 0 | 3 | 0 | 10 | 0 | 0 | 0 | 67 | 0 |
Pécs
| Pécs | 2008–09 | Nemzeti Bajnokság II | 3 | 0 | 0 | 0 | 7 | 0 | — | | 10 | 0 |
| Pécs | 2009–10 | Nemzeti Bajnokság II | 27 | 0 | 0 | 0 | — | | — | | 27 | 0 |
| Pécs | Total | | 30 | 0 | 0 | 0 | 7 | 0 | 0 | 0 | 37 | 0 |
MTK Budapest
| MTK Budapest | 2010–11 | Nemzeti Bajnokság I | 7 | 0 | 2 | 0 | 1 | 0 | — | | 10 | 0 |
| MTK Budapest | 2011–12 | Nemzeti Bajnokság II | 28 | 0 | 4 | 0 | 0 | 0 | — | | 32 | 0 |
| MTK Budapest | 2012–13 | Nemzeti Bajnokság I | 20 | 0 | 0 | 0 | 1 | 0 | 2 | 0 | 23 | 0 |
| MTK Budapest | 2013–14 | Nemzeti Bajnokság I | 24 | 0 | 1 | 0 | 3 | 0 | — | | 28 | 0 |
| MTK Budapest | 2014–15 | Nemzeti Bajnokság I | 29 | 0 | 1 | 0 | 2 | 0 | — | | 32 | 0 |
| MTK Budapest | 2015–16 | Nemzeti Bajnokság I | 33 | 0 | 0 | 0 | — | | 2 | 0 | 35 | 0 |
| MTK Budapest | 2016–17 | Nemzeti Bajnokság I | 7 | 0 | 0 | 0 | — | | 4 | 0 | 11 | 0 |
| MTK Budapest | Total | | 148 | 0 | 8 | 0 | 7 | 0 | 8 | 0 | 171 | 0 |
Puskás Akadémia
| Puskás Akadémia | 2016–17 | Nemzeti Bajnokság II | 31 | 0 | 0 | 0 | — | | — | | 31 | 0 |
| Puskás Akadémia | 2017–18 | Nemzeti Bajnokság I | 30 | 0 | 8 | 0 | — | | — | | 38 | 0 |
| Puskás Akadémia | 2018–19 | Nemzeti Bajnokság I | 18 | 0 | 4 | 0 | — | | — | | 22 | 0 |
| Puskás Akadémia | 2019–20 | Nemzeti Bajnokság I | 25 | 1 | 3 | 0 | — | | — | | 28 | 1 |
| Puskás Akadémia | Total | | 104 | 1 | 15 | 0 | 0 | 0 | 0 | 0 | 119 | 1 |
| Paks | 2020–21 | Nemzeti Bajnokság I | 19 | 0 | 0 | 0 | — | | — | | 19 | 0 |
| Career total | | | 345 | 1 | 26 | 0 | 24 | 0 | 8 | 0 | 413 | 1 |

Updated to games played as of 15 May 2021.

== International career ==
He was first called up to the senior side for November 2020 games.
