= 2004–05 Magyar Kupa =

Tournament details
- Country: Hungary

Final positions
- Champions: Sopron (1st title)
- Runners-up: Ferencváros

The 2004–05 Magyar Kupa (English: Hungarian Cup) was the 65th season of Hungary's annual knock-out cup football competition.

== Quarter-finals ==
Games were played on April 6, 2005.

Team 1	Score	Team 2
BKV Előre	3–2	Bodajk
Kazincbarcika	1–2	Sopron
Budapest Honvéd	1–1 (a.e.t.); 3–1 (pen.)	Fehérvár
Ferencváros	3–1	Kaposvár

== Semi-finals ==
Games were played on April 20, 2005.

Team 1	Score	Team 2
Sopron	4–2	Budapest Honvéd
BKV Előre	1–3	Ferencváros

== Final ==
11 May 2005
20:00 (UTC+2)

Ferencváros	1–5	Sopron
Lipcsei 49'	Report	Tóth 13'; Bárányos 38'; Balaskó 45', 57'; Horváth 73'

Sóstói Stadion, Székesfehérvár
Attendance: 4,000
Referee: Edo Trivković ( Croatia)

== See also ==
- 2004–05 Nemzeti Bajnokság I
- 2004–05 Nemzeti Bajnokság II
- 2004–05 Nemzeti Bajnokság III
