= 2004–05 Nemzeti Bajnokság II =

Nemzeti Bajnokság II
- Season: 2004–05
- Dates: 21 August 2004 – 12 June 2005
- Champions: Tatabánya
- Promoted: Tatabánya; Rákospalota
- Relegated: Szeged; Bodajk
- Matches: 182
- Goals: 537 (2.95 per match)
- Top goalscorer: Tibor Márkus (Tatabánya) (37 goals)

The 2004–05 Nemzeti Bajnokság II was the 107th season of the Nemzeti Bajnokság II, the second tier of the Hungarian football league.

== Teams ==
=== Stadium and locations ===
Location of teams in 2004-05 Nemzeti Bajnokság II

Following is the list of clubs competing in 2004–05 Nemzeti Bajnokság II, with their location, stadium and stadium capacity.

Team	Location	Stadium	Capacity
BKV Előre	Budapest (Józsefváros)	Sport utcai stadion	2,500
Bodajk	Bodajk	Kastélykerti Stadion	2,000
Dunaújváros	Dunaújváros	Eszperantó úti Stadion	12,000
Haladás	Szombathely	Rohonci úti Stadion	9,500
Hévíz	Hévíz	Kossuth Lajos utcai pálya	1,200
Kecskemét	Kecskemét	Széktói Stadion	6,320
Makó	Makó	Erdei Ferenc téri Sporttelep	3,500
Mosonmagyaróvár	Mosonmagyaróvár	Wittmann Antal park	4,000
Orosháza	Orosháza	Mátrai- Stadion	3,000
Rákospalota	Budapest (Rákospalota)	Budai II. László Stadion	7,500
Szeged	Szeged	Felső Tisza-parti Stadion	15,000
Szolnok	Szolnok	Régi Tiszaligeti Stadion	4,000
Tatabánya	Tatabánya	Grosics Gyula Stadion	5,021
Vác	Vác	Ligeti Stadion	9,000

== League table ==
Pos	Team	Pld	W	D	L	GF	GA	GD	Pts	Qualification or relegation
1	Tatabánya (C, P)	26	19	5	2	74	19	+55	62	Promotion to Nemzeti Bajnokság I
2	Rákospalota (P)	26	15	8	3	42	18	+24	53	Promotion to Nemzeti Bajnokság I
3	Vác	26	13	3	10	39	38	+1	42	
4	Kecskemét	26	11	7	8	45	36	+9	40	
5	Dunaújváros	26	11	3	12	43	46	−3	36	
6	Szolnok	26	9	9	8	30	36	−6	36	
7	Szeged (R)	26	11	3	12	37	36	+1	34 (Note: Szeged was deducted 2 points)	Dissolved - Not competed in any division next season
8	BKV Előre	26	9	6	11	34	37	−3	33	
9	Bodajk (R)	26	9	5	12	36	36	0	32	Relegation to Megyei Bajnokság III (Note: Bodajk ceased to exist after the team was moved to Siófok to compete as BFC Siófok, the newly formed club continued in Megyei Bajnokság III.)
10	Mosonmagyaróvár	26	8	7	11	31	43	−12	31	
11	Orosháza	26	8	6	12	26	50	−24	30	
12	Makó	26	8	5	13	39	47	−8	29	
13	Haladás	26	8	4	14	28	38	−10	28	
14	Hévíz	26	7	1	18	33	57	−24	22	

Source: Magyarfutball
(C) Champions; (P) Promoted; (R) Relegated

== Results ==
Home \ Away	BKV	BOD	DUN	HAL	HEV	KEC	MAK	MOS	ORO	RAK	SZE	SZO	TAT	VAC
BKV Előre	—	0–4	2–1	0–2	1–0	1–1	3–1	2–0	4–0	1–3	1–0	2–0	2–2	0–1
Bodajk	1–1	—	3–2	1–0	2–0	2–0	4–2	5–1	3–1	0–1	0–3	1–1	1–1	1–3
Dunaújváros	2–4	2–1	—	4–2	2–1	1–1	4–3	2–0	1–0	1–2	0–1	2–1	0–0	0–2
Haladás	3–1	1–0	0–1	—	3–0	2–1	3–1	1–1	5–2	0–3	2–0	0–0	1–3	1–2
Hévíz	2–3	1–0	2–0	3–0	—	1–5	2–2	2–1	0–1	1–2	1–5	1–3	3–1	3–2
Kecskemét	2–0	2–1	0–3	1–1	2–0	—	3–0	2–2	1–1	2–1	1–3	2–3	2–3	3–0
Makó	2–0	5–2	1–2	1–0	5–1	2–5	—	2–0	1–2	0–0	2–1	0–0	0–2	3–2
Mosonmagyaróvár	1–0	2–0	2–2	1–0	1–0	3–1	0–0	—	3–1	1–2	1–1	1–0	0–5	0–2
Orosháza	3–3	1–0	2–0	2–1	2–4	0–0	0–0	1–4	—	1–1	1–0	0–1	1–1	1–0
Rákospalota	0–0	0–0	3–1	0–0	4–2	1–0	1–0	3–0	4–0	—	3–1	0–1	1–3	3–1
Szeged	1–1	1–2	1–0	1–0	2–1	1–2	1–3	3–2	3–0	1–1	—	3–0	0–1	2–1
Szolnok	2–1	1–1	2–4	2–0	2–1	2–2	2–1	2–2	0–3	1–1	3–0	—	0–4	0–0
Tatabánya	1–0	2–0	6–4	5–0	4–0	1–2	5–1	3–1	7–0	0–0	4–0	3–0	—	3–0
Vác	2–1	2–1	4–2	2–0	2–1	1–2	2–1	1–1	3–0	0–2	3–2	1–1	0–4	—

Source: Magyarfutball
Legend: Blue = home team win; Yellow = draw; Red = away team win.

== See also ==
- 2004–05 Magyar Kupa
- 2004–05 Nemzeti Bajnokság I
- 2004–05 Nemzeti Bajnokság III
