= 2004–05 Nemzeti Bajnokság III =

Nemzeti Bajnokság III
- Season: 2004–05
- Champions: Felcsút (West); Baktalórántháza VSE (East)
- Promoted: None

The 2004–05 Nemzeti Bajnokság III season was the 23rd edition of the Nemzeti Bajnokság III.

== League table ==
=== Western group ===
Pos	Team	Pld	W	D	L	GF	GA	GD	Pts	Relegation
1	Felcsút	30	20	6	4	73	32	+41	66	
2	Paksi SE	30	16	8	6	50	23	+27	56	
3	Integrál DAC	30	16	4	10	59	44	+15	52	
4	Barcsi SC	30	14	7	9	50	36	+14	49	
5	Celldömölki VSE	30	14	6	10	52	35	+17	48	
6	Soroksár SC	30	13	8	9	49	37	+12	47	
7	Budakalász MSE	30	12	8	10	59	45	+14	44	
8	Balatonlelle SE	30	12	8	10	52	52	0	44	
9	Gyirmót SE	30	11	11	8	45	40	+5	44	
10	FC Veszprém	30	12	6	12	39	47	−8	42	
11	Szentlőrinci SE	30	12	5	13	46	39	+7	41	
12	Kaposvölgye VSC	30	10	9	11	36	35	+1	39	
13	Komlói Bányász SK	30	9	11	10	39	35	+4	38	
14	Budafoki MTE	30	6	6	18	29	68	−39	24	Relegation to Megyei Bajnokság I
15	Mezőfalva	30	4	5	21	34	80	−46	17	Relegation to Megyei Bajnokság I
16	Pénzügyőr SE	30	4	2	24	25	89	−64	14	

=== Eastern group ===
Pos	Team	Pld	W	D	L	GF	GA	GD	Pts	Relegation
1	Baktalórántháza VSE	30	23	5	2	71	21	+50	74	
2	Vecsési FC	30	21	5	4	57	22	+35	68	
3	Szentesi Kinizsi SZITE	30	18	7	5	75	39	+36	61	
4	Jászapáti	30	17	10	3	56	27	+29	61	
5	Kazincbarcikai SC	30	17	6	7	86	50	+36	57	
6	Bőcs KSC	30	15	5	10	80	47	+33	50	
7	Karcagi SE	30	13	5	12	65	50	+15	44	
8	Gyulai Termál FC	30	12	5	13	46	50	−4	41	
9	Putnok VSE	30	11	6	13	40	52	−12	39	
10	Mátészalkai MTK	30	11	4	15	51	56	−5	37	
11	FC Dabas	30	8	7	15	47	63	−16	31	
12	Kistarcsa	30	9	3	18	37	68	−31	30	
13	Erzsébeti SMTK	30	7	6	17	39	73	−34	27	
14	Hajdúböszörményi TE	30	7	2	21	37	81	−44	23	
15	Salgótarjáni BTC	30	6	5	19	30	56	−26	23	Relegation to Megyei Bajnokság I
16	Kiskunhalasi FC	30	4	1	25	31	93	−62	13	Relegation to Megyei Bajnokság I

== See also ==
- 2004–05 Magyar Kupa
- 2004–05 Nemzeti Bajnokság I
- 2004–05 Nemzeti Bajnokság II
