= 2008–09 Nemzeti Bajnokság II =

Nemzeti Bajnokság II
- Season: 2008–09
- Champions: Gyirmót (West); Ferencváros (East)
- Promoted: Pápa (West); Ferencváros (East)
- Relegated: Baja (West); Százhalombatta (West); Dunaújváros (West); ESMTK (East); Jászberény (East); Tököl (East)
- All statistics correct as of 15 July 2009.

The 2008–09 Nemzeti Bajnokság II was Hungary's the 111th season of the Nemzeti Bajnokság II, the second tier of the Hungarian football league system. Gyirmót and Ferencváros won the 2008-09 season. Ferencváros were promoted to the first division after spending three consecutive season in the second tier.

== League table ==
=== Western group ===
Pos	Team	Pld	W	D	L	GF	GA	GD	Pts	Promotion or relegation
1	Gyirmót	30	20	7	3	60	30	+30	67	
2	Pápa (P)	30	20	6	4	65	19	+46	66	Promotion to Nemzeti Bajnokság I
3	Pécs	30	20	5	5	62	21	+41	65	
4	Tatabánya	30	15	6	9	49	35	+14	51	
5	Kaposvölgye	30	15	5	10	50	42	+8	50	
6	Ajka	30	13	10	7	44	31	+13	49	
7	Budaörs	30	11	7	12	48	51	−3	40	
8	Kozármisleny	30	10	9	11	40	40	0	39	
9	Felcsút	30	10	8	12	38	41	−3	38	
10	Zalaegerszeg II	30	10	7	13	41	49	−8	37	
11	Integrál-DAC	30	9	7	14	38	39	−1	34	
12	Barcs	30	9	6	15	33	52	−19	33	
13	Győr II	30	9	5	16	46	55	−9	32	
14	Bajai LSE (R)	30	8	8	14	35	44	−9	32	Relegation to Nemzeti Bajnokság III
15	Százhalombatta (R)	30	5	7	18	24	59	−35	22	Relegation to Nemzeti Bajnokság III
16	Dunaújváros (D, R)	0	0	0	0	0	0	0	0	Relegation to Nemzeti Bajnokság III

Source: Hungarian Football Federation (in Hungarian), Soccerway
Rules for classification: 1) Points; 2) Matches won; 3) Goal difference; 4) Goals scored; 5) Head-to-head points; 6) Head-to-head goal difference; 7) Head-to-head away goals scored; 8) Fair play ranking; 9) Drawing of lots.
(D) Disqualified; (P) Promoted; (R) Relegated

=== Eastern group ===
Pos	Team	Pld	W	D	L	GF	GA	GD	Pts	Promotion or relegation
1	Ferencváros (P)	30	25	3	2	94	22	+72	78	Promotion to Nemzeti Bajnokság I
2	Debrecen II	30	19	4	7	72	38	+34	61	
3	Makó	30	17	5	8	61	44	+17	56	
4	Bőcs	30	15	7	8	56	34	+22	52	
5	Kazincbarcika	30	14	9	7	52	47	+5	51	
6	Szolnok	30	13	8	9	52	42	+10	47	
7	MTK Budapest II	30	12	6	12	42	45	−3	42	
8	BKV Előre	30	11	7	12	53	47	+6	40	
9	Vác	30	11	4	15	63	67	−4	37	
10	Cegléd	30	10	7	13	41	48	−7	37	
11	Vecsés	30	10	6	14	45	51	−6	36	
12	Békéscsaba	30	9	7	14	42	62	−20	34	
13	Baktalórántháza	30	8	6	16	37	63	−26	30	
14	Erzsébeti Spartacus (R)	30	8	5	17	46	68	−22	29	Relegation to Nemzeti Bajnokság III
15	Jászberény (R)	30	7	7	16	31	56	−25	28	Relegation to Nemzeti Bajnokság III
16	Tököl (R)	30	4	3	23	29	83	−54	15	Relegation to Nemzeti Bajnokság III

Source: Hungarian Football Federation (in Hungarian), Soccerway
Rules for classification: 1) Points; 2) Matches won; 3) Goal difference; 4) Goals scored; 5) Head-to-head points; 6) Head-to-head goal difference; 7) Head-to-head away goals scored; 8) Fair play ranking; 9) Drawing of lots.
(P) Promoted; (R) Relegated

== See also ==
- 2008–09 Magyar Kupa
- 2008–09 Nemzeti Bajnokság I
- 2008–09 Nemzeti Bajnokság III
