= Zsolt Horváth (footballer) =

Hungarian footballer and television sports commentator

Personal information
- Full name: Zsolt Horváth
- Date of birth: 19 May 1988 (age 38)
- Place of birth: Pécs, Hungary
- Height: 1.84 m (6 ft 1/2 in)
- Position: Forward

Youth career
- 2002–2006: Pécs

Senior career*
Years	Team	Apps	(Gls)
2006–2013	Pécs	114	(22)
2010	→ Pogány (loan)	10	(7)
2013–2015	MTK	43	(7)
2015–2017	Debrecen	36	(8)
- * Club domestic league appearances and goals as of 12 May 2018

Zsolt Horváth (born 19 May 1988) is a retired Hungarian professional football player and television sports commentator. He was active in Hungarian national leagues from 2006 to 2017. He holds a degree in law.

== Club ==
As of 10 October 2016.

Club	Season	League	League		Cup		League Cup		Europe		Other		Total	
Club	Season	League	Apps	Goals	Apps	Goals	Apps	Goals	Apps	Goals	Apps	Goals	Apps	Goals
Pécs	2006–07	NB I	3	0	1	0	–		–		–		4	0
Pécs	2007–08	NB II	23	3	1	1	–		–		–		24	4
Pécs	2008–09	NB II	22	6	1	0	13	10	–		–		36	16
Pécs	2009–10	NB II	18	5	3	3	–		–		–		21	8
Pécs	2010–11	NB II	12	2	0	0	–		–		–		12	2
Pécs	2011–12	NB I	26	6	2	0	3	1	–		–		31	7
Pécs	2012–13	NB I	9	0	0	0	4	1	–		–		13	1
Pécs	Total		113	22	8	4	20	12	–		–		141	38
MTK Budapest	2013–14	NB I	15	3	6	1	1	1	–		–		22	5
MTK Budapest	2014–15	NB I	28	4	4	4	7	2	–		–		39	10
MTK Budapest	Total		43	7	10	5	8	3	–		–		61	15
Debrecen	2015–16	NB I	18	6	7	1	–		4	0	–		29	7
Debrecen	2016–17	NB I	11	2	1	0	–		1	0	–		13	2
Debrecen	Total		29	8	8	1	–		5	0	–		42	9
Career totals			185	37	26	10	28	15	5	0	–		244	62
