= Tamás Szalai (footballer, born 1980) =

Hungarian footballer

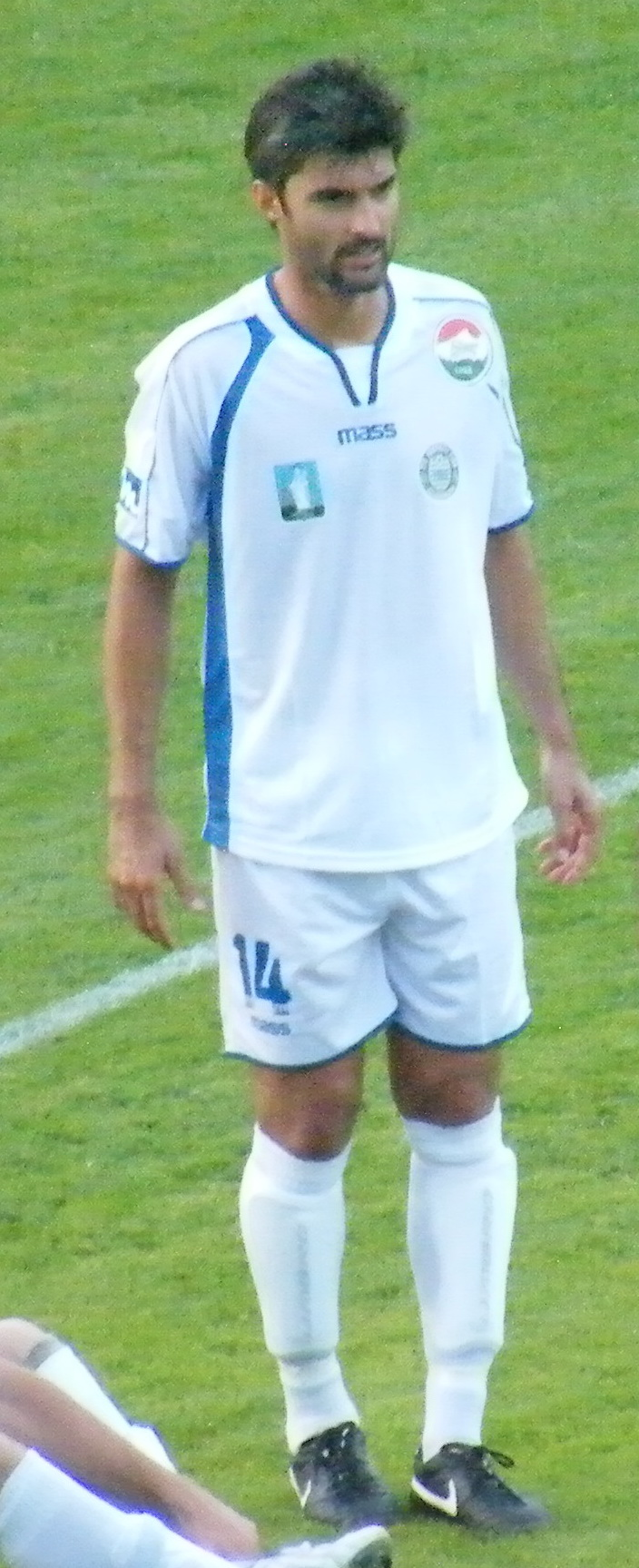
- Szalai Tamás in action

Personal information
- Date of birth: 10 January 1980 (age 46)
- Place of birth: Székesfehérvár, Hungary
- Height: 1.84 m (6 ft 0 in)
- Position: Winger

Team information
- Current team: Győr (assistant manager)

Senior career*
| Years | Team | Apps | (Gls) |
| 1998–2004 | Videoton | 129 | (8) |
| 2004–2008 | Felcsút | 83 | (12) |
| 2008–2009 | Pécs | 26 | (8) |
| 2009–2013 | Zalaegerszeg | 74 | (5) |
| 2013–2015 | Dunaújváros | 15 | (2) |
| 2015–2017 | Csákvár | 57 | (5) |
| 2017 | Videoton II | 6 | (1) |

Managerial career
- 2017: Videoton II (player-coach)
- 2018–2021: Fehérvár (assistant)
- 2021: Fehérvár (caretaker)
- 2021–2022: Fehérvár II
- 2022–: Győr (assistant)
- * Club domestic league appearances and goals

Tamás Szalai (born 1 October 1980) is a Hungarian football coach and a former midfielder. He is an assistant manager of Győr. He played on the right side of the midfield.

== Managerial career ==
He was appointed as the interim manager of Fehérvár FC in February 2021 and was in charge for 5 games.
