= Tamás Törtei =

Hungarian footballer

Personal information
- Full name: Tamás Törtei
- Date of birth: 13 October 1985 (age 41)
- Place of birth: Szolnok, Hungary
- Height: 1.89 m (6 ft 2 1/2 in)
- Position: Defender

Team information
- Current team: Tarpa FC

Youth career
- 2002–2004: Szombathely

Senior career*
Years	Team	Apps	(Gls)
2004	Celldömölk		
2004–2008	Marcali	15	(5)
2008–2012	Pécs	56	(4)
2009–2010	→ Barcs (loan)	24	(0)
2012	Szolnok	8	(0)
2012–2013	Tatabánya	21	(2)
2013–2017	Nyíregyháza	53	(3)
2017	Cegléd	9	(0)
2018–	Tarpa FC	?	(?)
- * Club domestic league appearances and goals as of 13 February 2018

Tamás Törtei (born 2 October 1985) is a Hungarian football player who currently plays for Tarpa FC.
