= Baktalórántháza VSE =

Hungarian football club

- Full name: Baktalórántháza Városi Sportegyesület
- Founded: 1916; 110 years ago, as Baktalórántházi EPOSZ
- Ground: Városi Stadion
- Capacity: 2,000
- Chairman: Attila Kozma
- Manager: Pál Gebri
- League: MB II; Szabolcs-Szatmár-Bereg
- 2022–23: MB II; Szabolcs-Szatmár-Bereg, 7th of 14
Home colours	Away colours

Baktalórántháza VSE is a Hungarian football club located in Baktalórántháza, Hungary. The team's colors are white and blue. It currently plays in Megyei Bajnokság II – Szabolcs-Szatmár-Bereg, the fifth tier of Hungarian football.

== History ==
Baktalórántháza won the 2004–05 Nemzeti Bajnokság III season and gained promotion to the second division. The club spent five consecutive years in the second division. However, the club finished last in the 2009–10 Nemzeti Bajnokság II season and were relegated to the third division.

== Honours ==
- Nemzeti Bajnokság III:
  - Winners (1): 2004–05

== Seasons ==
The table below shows the seasons of Baktalórántháza VSE.

Season	Tier	Club's name	Position	Pts
1947–48	4	Baktalórántházi SE	12 / 12	-
1948–49	4	Baktalórántháza	14 / 14	14
1949–50	5	Baktalórántházi EPOSZ	2 / 11	27
1950	4	Baktalórántházi DISz	11 / 12	6
1951	4	Baktalórántháza	0 / 8	
1952	4	Baktalórántháza	0 / 8	
1955	4	Baktalórántházi Traktor	9 / 14	23
1956	4	Baktalórántházi Traktor	9 / 14	18
1957	4	Baktalórántháza	3 / 10	24
1957–58	4	Baktalórántháza	12 / 14	19
1958–59	4	Baktalórántházi MEDOSz	0 / 16	
1959–60	5	Baktalórántháza	13 / 14	13
1961–62	5	Baktalórántháza	3 / 12	24
1962–63	5	Baktalórántháza	6 / 16	30
1963	6	Baktalórántháza	8 / 11	4
1964	6	Baktalórántháza	11 / 16	29
1965	6	Baktalórántházi TSZ	1 / 16	45
1966	5	Baktalórántházi TSZ SK	15 / 18	25
1967	6	Baktalórántháza	1 / 14	38
1968	5	Baktalórántházi TSZ SE	5 / 16	35
1969	5	Baktalórántházi TSZ	12 / 16	26
1970	5	Baktalórántházi TSZ	8 / 8	6
1970–71	5	Baktalórántházi MEDOSZ	7 / 16	32
1971–72	5	Baktalórántházi MEDOSZ	16 / 16	11
1972–73	6	Baktalórántházi MEDOSZ	1 / 16	42
1973–74	5	Baktalórántházi MEDOSZ	12 / 16	28
1974–75	4	Baktalórántházi MEDOSZ	16 / 16	18
1975–76	5	Baktalórántházi MEDOSZ	4 / 16	40
1976–77	5	Baktalórántházi MEDOSZ	8 / 16	31
1977–78	5	Baktalórántházi TSZ	7 / 16	33
1978–79	4	Baktalórántházi TSZ SE	11 / 18	26
1979–80	4	Baktalórántházi TSZ SE	13 / 16	23
1980–81	4	Baktalórántházi TSZ SE	1 / 16	40
1981–82	4	Baktalórántházi TSz SE	4 / 18	46
1982–83	4	Baktalórántházi TSZ SE	1 / 18	48
1983–84	3	Baktalórántházi TSz SE	12 / 16	27
1984–85	3	Baktalórántházi TSz SE	15 / 16	16
1985–86	4	Baktalórántházi TSZ SE	14 / 16	24
1986–87	5	Baktalórántháza	2 / 16	43
1987–88	4	Baktalórántházi TSZ SE	6 / 16	36
1988–89	4	Baktalórántházi TSZ SE	4 / 16	35
1989–90	4	Baktalórántházi TSZ SE	2 / 16	37
1990–91	4	Baktalórántházi SE	4 / 16	37
1991–92	4	Baktalórántházi SE	2 / 16	46
1992–93	4	Baktalórántházi TSZ SE	5 / 16	38
1993–94	4	Baktalórántházi SE	2 / 16	48
1994–95	4	Baktalórántházai SE	1 / 18	85
1995–96	3	Baktalórántházi SE	7 / 16	41
1996–97	3	Baktalórántházi SE	6 / 16	47
1997–98	4	Baktalórántháza	11 / 16	37
1998–99	4	Baktalórántházi VSE	3 / 16	53
1999–00	4	Baktalórántháza	5 / 16	53
2000	3	Baktalórántháza	1 / 8	23
2000–01	3	Baktalórántháza	8 / 12	26
2001–02	3	Baktalórántháza VSE	13 / 13	12
2002–03	3	Baktalórántháza VSE	11 / 12	18
2002–03	3	Baktalórántháza VSE	11 / 12	38
2003–04	3	Baktalórántháza	4 / 16	57
2004–05	3	Baktalórántháza	1 / 16	74
2005–06	2	Baktalórántháza	11 / 16	35
2006–07	2	Baktalórántháza VSE	10 / 16	33
2007–08	2	Baktalórántháza VSE	11 / 16	34
2008–09	2	Baktalórántháza VSE	13 / 16	30
2009–10	2	Baktalórántháza VSE	15 / 15	0
2010–11	3	Baktalórántháza VSE	6 / 16	53
2011–12	3	Baktalórántháza VSE	10 / 16	40
2012–13	3	Baktalórántháza VSE	9 / 14	33
2013–14	4	Baktalórántháza VSE	2 / 16	60
2014–15	4	Baktalórántháza VSE	3 / 16	59
2015–16	4	Baktalórántháza VSE	7 / 16	42
2016–17	4	Baktalórántháza VSE	7 / 16	40
2017–18	4	Baktalórántháza VSE	10 / 16	35
2018–19	4	Baktalórántháza VSE	7 / 16	43
2019–20	4	Baktalórántháza VSE	13 / 16	17
2020–21	4	Baktalórántháza VSE	15 / 16	24
2021–22	5	Baktalórántháza VSE	5 / 14	48
2022–23	5	Baktalórántháza VSE	7 / 14	35
2023–24	5	Baktalórántháza VSE	3 / 14	53
2024–25	4	Baktalórántháza VSE	13 / 15	23
2025–26	4	Baktalórántháza VSE	10 / 15	29
