= Balázs Berdó =

Hungarian footballer

Personal information
- Full name: Balázs Berdó
- Date of birth: 25 May 1982 (age 44)
- Place of birth: Pécs, Hungary
- Height: 1.74 m (5 ft 8 1/2 in)
- Position: Midfielder

Youth career
- Pécsi Mecsek FC

Senior career*
Years	Team	Apps	(Gls)
1998–2006	Pécsi Mecsek FC	120	(3)
2006–2007	Digenis Morphou	12	(2)
2007–2008	Budapest Honvéd FC	11	(0)
2008–2010	Pécsi Mecsek FC	39	(7)
2010–2011	Kozármisleny SE	21	(6)

International career
2002–2003	Hungary U-21	1	(0)
- * Club domestic league appearances and goals

Balázs Berdó (born 25 May 1982, in Pécs) is a retired Hungarian football (midfielder) player.

== Digenis Morphou ==
In 2006, Balázs Berdó was recruited as right midfielder by the Cypriot team Digenis Morphou and this move was possible due to the effort input by Mr Kosta Christodoulou.
