= Dávid Wittrédi =

Hungarian footballer

Personal information
- Date of birth: 17 June 1987 (age 39)
- Place of birth: Pécs, Hungary
- Height: 1.75 m (5 ft 9 in)
- Position: Forward

Youth career
- 2002–2007: Pécs

Senior career*
Years	Team	Apps	(Gls)
2007–2011	Pécs	89	(12)
2005–2006	→ Szentlőrinc (loan)	8	(7)
2011–2012	Kozármisleny	16	(12)
2012–2015	Pécs	60	(7)
2015	Debrecen	1	(0)
2015–2016	Kozármisleny	15	(11)
2016	Zalaegerszegi TE	14	(5)
2016–2017	Kozármisleny	22	(1)
2017–2018	Pécs	27	(12)
2018–2019	Kozármisleny	24	(7)
2019–2021	Pécsváradi Spartacus	12	(9)
2021–2022	Kozármisleny	1	(0)
2022	III. Kerületi		
- * Club domestic league appearances and goals

Dávid Wittrédi (born 17 June 1987) is a Hungarian former football player.
