= Gábor Kovács (footballer, born September 1987) =

Hungarian footballer

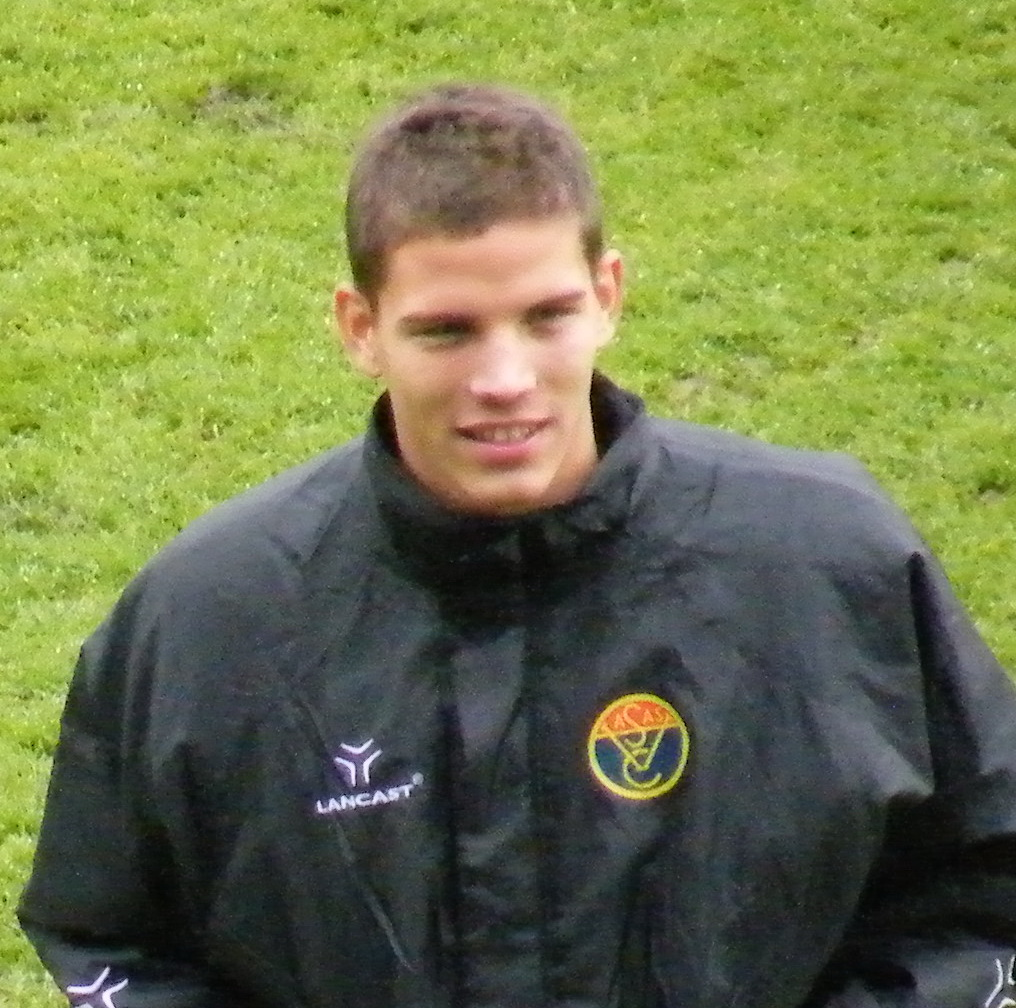

Personal information
- Date of birth: 4 September 1987 (age 39)
- Place of birth: Budapest, Hungary
- Height: 1.90 m (6 ft 3 in)
- Position: Defender

Youth career
- 2003–2006: Ferencváros

Senior career*
Years	Team	Apps	(Gls)
2006–2008	Vasas	15	(1)
2008–2009	Winterthur U21	6	(0)
2009	Kreuzlingen	3	(0)
2009–2012	Vasas	79	(3)
2009	→ Pécs (loan)	9	(0)
2012–2013	Eger	17	(0)
2013–2015	Paks	45	(2)
2015–2016	Diósgyőr	18	(0)
2016–2017	Paks	3	(0)
2017	→ Zalaegerszeg (loan)	8	(0)
2017–2018	Csákvár	5	(0)
2018	Dunaújváros	13	(1)
2018–2019	Pénzügyőr	14	(1)
2019–2021	BVSC-Zugló	27	(0)

International career
2003	Hungary U-17	1	(0)
2007	Hungary U-21	5	(0)
- * Club domestic league appearances and goals

Gábor Kovács (born 4 September 1987) is a Hungarian former professional footballer.
