= Olivér Nagy (footballer, born 1989) =

Hungarian footballer

Personal information
- Full name: Olivér Nagy
- Date of birth: 30 January 1989 (age 37)
- Place of birth: Pécs, Hungary
- Height: 1.71 m (5 ft 7 in)
- Position: Midfielder

Youth career
- 2000–2001: Góliát
- 2001–2002: Pécs
- 2002–2006: Újpest

Senior career*
Years	Team	Apps	(Gls)
2006–2008	Újpest	26	(2)
2008	→ Pécs (loan)	11	(3)
2008–2013	Pécs	99	(14)
2013–2014	Paks	10	(1)
2014–2015	Haladás	13	(1)
2015	→ Ceahlăul Piatra Neamț (loan)	3	(0)
2015–2016	SZTK	15	(2)
2016–2017	Gyirmót	9	(0)
2017	Soroksár	11	(0)
2017–2018	Balassagyarmati	19	(3)
2018–2019	III. Kerületi	15	(0)
2019	Szolnoki MÁV	11	(1)
2019–2021	Lipóti SK	42	(4)
2021–2022	Tiszafüredi VSE	15	(3)

International career
2007–2008	Hungary U-19	9	(2)
2008–2009	Hungary U-20	4	(0)
- * Club domestic league appearances and goals

Olivér Nagy (born 30 January 1989) is a retired Hungarian football player.
