= 2009–10 Nemzeti Bajnokság II =

Nemzeti Bajnokság II
- Season: 2009–10
- Champions: Siófok (West); Szolnok (East)
- Promoted: Siófok (West); Szolnok (East)
- Relegated: Zalaegerszeg II (West); Hévíz (West); Baktalórántháza (East)
- All statistics correct as of 15 July 2010.

The 2009–10 Nemzeti Bajnokság II was Hungary's the 112th season of the Nemzeti Bajnokság II, the second tier of the Hungarian football league system.

== League table ==
=== Eastern group ===
Pos	Team	Pld	W	D	L	GF	GA	GD	Pts	Promotion or relegation
1	Szolnok (C, P)	28	18	6	4	54	28	+26	60	Promotion to Nemzeti Bajnokság I
2	Debrecen II	28	17	4	7	53	26	+27	55	
3	Vác	28	15	7	6	47	36	+11	52	
4	Rákospalota	28	15	5	8	76	36	+40	50	
5	Mezőkövesd	28	11	9	8	37	35	+2	42	
6	Vecsés	28	11	8	9	45	32	+13	41	
7	Makó	28	11	5	12	46	46	0	38	
8	BKV Előre	28	9	11	8	38	39	−1	38	
9	Bőcs	28	9	11	8	33	36	−3	38	
10	Hajdúböszörmény	28	10	7	11	33	36	−3	37	
11	MTK Budapest II	28	10	5	13	53	48	+5	35	
12	Kazincbarcika	28	9	5	14	35	50	−15	32	
13	Békéscsaba	28	7	7	14	31	44	−13	28	
14	Cegléd	28	6	9	13	40	53	−13	27	
15	Baktalórántháza (Note: Baktalórántháza were deducted 6 points.) (R)	28	1	3	24	21	97	−76	0	Relegation to Nemzeti Bajnokság III

Source: soccerway.com
Rules for classification: 1st points; 2nd overall wins; 3rd goal difference; 4th goals scored
(C) Champions; (P) Promoted; (R) Relegated

=== Western group ===
Pos	Team	Pld	W	D	L	GF	GA	GD	Pts	Promotion or relegation
1	Siófok (C, P)	28	20	3	5	49	20	+29	63	Promotion to Nemzeti Bajnokság I
2	Gyirmót	28	19	5	4	56	25	+31	62	
3	Pécs	28	16	7	5	56	25	+31	55	
4	Ajka	28	14	5	9	47	45	+2	47	
5	Tatabánya	28	14	3	11	49	41	+8	45	
6	Kozármisleny	28	11	8	9	42	35	+7	41	
7	Győr II	28	9	12	7	43	31	+12	39	
8	Szigetszentmiklós (Note: Szigetszentmiklós were deducted 1 points.)	28	10	9	9	43	45	−2	38	
9	Fehérvár II	28	10	6	12	41	43	−2	36	
10	Budaörs	28	9	6	13	38	47	−9	33	
11	Kaposvölgye	28	8	7	13	36	44	−8	31	
12	Budapest Honvéd II	28	6	9	13	29	54	−25	27	
13	Barcs	28	6	5	17	25	45	−20	23	
14	Hévíz (R)	28	5	5	18	23	55	−32	20	Relegation to Nemzeti Bajnokság III
15	Zalaegerszeg II (R)	28	4	8	16	29	51	−22	20	Relegation to Nemzeti Bajnokság III

Source: soccerway.com
Rules for classification: 1st points; 2nd overall wins; 3rd goal difference; 4th goals scored
(C) Champions; (P) Promoted; (R) Relegated

== See also ==
- 2009–10 Magyar Kupa
- 2009–10 Nemzeti Bajnokság I
- 2009–10 Nemzeti Bajnokság III
