= Alison Silva =

Brazilian footballer (born 1988)

Personal information
- Full name: Alison Pierre Moreira e Silva
- Date of birth: 1 June 1988 (age 38)
- Place of birth: Palmeiras, Brazil
- Height: 1.79 m (5 ft 10 1/2 in)
- Position: Forward

Team information
- Current team: FC Volgar Astrakhan
- Number: 37

Senior career*
Years	Team	Apps	(Gls)
2006–2008	Porto de Caruaru		
2009–2011	Videoton FC	10	(2)
2009–2010	→ Videoton FC II (loan)	14	(2)
2011	Ferencvárosi TC	1	(0)
2012–	FC Volgar Astrakhan	7	(0)
- * Club domestic league appearances and goals as of 20:57, 1 July 2013 (UTC)

Alison Silva (born 1 July 1988 in Palmeiras) is a Brazilian football player who plays for FC Volgar Astrakhan in the Russian First Division.
