= FC Felcsút =

Hungarian football club

Felcsút
- Full name: FC Felcsút
- Founded: 2007 (1931 as Felcsút SC)
- Ground: Felcsúti Sportkomplexum, Felcsút
- Capacity: 3,000
- Chairman: Viktor Orbán
- Manager: Szíjjártó István
- League: NB II (Western Group)
- 2006–07: 3rd
Home colours	Away colours

FC Felcsút is a Hungarian football team based in the village of Felcsút. They play in the league NB II of the Western Group.

== Honours ==
=== League ===
- Nemzeti Bajnokság III:
  - Winners (1): 2004–05
