= 2012–13 Pécsi MFC season =

Pécs
2012–13 season
- Chairman: Dezső Matyi
- Manager: Attila Supka (until 4 January 2013); Gábor Márton
- Nemzeti Bajnokság I: 12th
- Hungarian Cup: Round of 32
- Hungarian League Cup: Semi-finals
- Top goalscorer: League: Miroslav Grumić (6); Dávid Wittrédi (6); All: Miroslav Grumić (10)
- Highest home attendance: 5,000 v Ferencváros (4 August 2012)
- Lowest home attendance: 70 v Paks (5 December 2012)
Home colours	Away colours

The 2012–13 season will be Pécsi Mecsek Football Club's 48th competitive season, 2nd consecutive season in the OTP Bank Liga and 62nd year in existence as a football club.

== First team squad ==
Note: Flags indicate national team as defined under FIFA eligibility rules; some limited exceptions apply. Players may hold more than one non-FIFA nationality.

No.	Pos.	Nation	Player
5	DF	HUN	Ferenc Fodor
6	DF	HUN	Béla Balogh
7	FW	HUN	Dávid Wittrédi
8	MF	HUN	Dávid Márkvárt
9	FW	HUN	Krisztián Koller
10	MF	HUN	Olivér Nagy
11	FW	SRB	Miroslav Grumić
12	GK	HUN	Dénes Dibusz
13	MF	HUN	Lóránd Szatmári
16	GK	ROU	András Sánta
17	MF	HUN	Adrián Horváth
18	MF	HUN	Levente Lantos

No.	Pos.	Nation	Player
20	FW	NGR	Solomon Okoronkwo
20	DF	HUN	Pál Lázár
21	MF	SLO	Zoran Zeljkovič
22	FW	HUN	Péter Beke
24	DF	HUN	Miklós Gaál
25	DF	CZE	Jiří Krejčí
26	DF	CRO	Andrej Čaušić
27	MF	HUN	Róbert Kővári
28	DF	CIV	Jean-Baptiste Akassou
33	MF	NGR	Eke Uzoma
69	FW	HUN	Zsolt Horváth
82	MF	SRB	Aleksandar Stoimirović
99	FW	HUN	Attila Simon

== Transfers ==
=== Summer ===
In: Note: Flags indicate national team as defined under FIFA eligibility rules; some limited exceptions apply. Players may hold more than one non-FIFA nationality.

No.	Pos.	Nation	Player
2	FW	HUN	Roland Frőhlich (from MTK Budapest)
3	DF	CRO	Luka Vučko (from (Poland) Lechia Gdańsk)
5	DF	HUN	Ferenc Fodor (loan return from Kozármisleny)
6	DF	CIV	Jean-Baptiste Akassou (from Budapest Honvéd)
7	MF	HUN	Dávid Wittrédi (from Kozármisleny)
8	DF	SLO	Leon Panikvar (from Zalaegerszeg)
8	DF	HUN	Attila Pintér (loan return from Kozármisleny)
9	FW	SRB	Miroslav Grumić (from Kaposvár)
11	FW	SVK	Zoltán Harsányi (from (Slovakia) Dunajská Streda)
13	MF	HUN	Lóránd Szatmári (from (Italy) Reggina)
13	MF	HUN	Dávid Pákolicz (loan return from Nyíregyháza)
16	GK	ROU	András Sánta (from Budapest Honvéd)
17	MF	HUN	Adrián Horváth (from Budapest Honvéd)
19	FW	HUN	Szabolcs Gyánó (loan return from Kozármisleny)
22	DF	HUN	László Bodnár (from (Austria) Salzburg)
24	FW	BRA	Nicolas Ceolin (from Budapest Honvéd)
25	DF	CZE	Jiří Krejčí (from (Czech Republic) Příbram)
27	MF	HUN	István Eszlátyi (loan return from BKV Előre)
33	MF	NGR	Eke Uzoma (from (Germany) 1860 München)
47	GK	HUN	Péter Molnár (from Szombathely)
82	MF	SRB	Aleksandar Stoimirović (from (Romania) Petrolul Ploiești)
TBA	MF	MNE	Slobodan Lakićević (from (Bosnia and Herzegovina) Velez Mostar)

Out: Note: Flags indicate national team as defined under FIFA eligibility rules; some limited exceptions apply. Players may hold more than one non-FIFA nationality.

No.	Pos.	Nation	Player
2	FW	HUN	Roland Frőhlich (loan to Kozármisleny)
3	DF	BIH	Vlado Marković (to (Bosnia and Herzegovina) Čelik Zenica)
4	DF	HUN	József Nagy (loan to Kozármisleny)
5	MF	GHA	Samuel Ato (to Pálhalma)
6	MF	CRO	Goran Paracki (to (Croatia) Split)
8	DF	HUN	Attila Pintér (to Sopron)
9	FW	HUN	Péter Andorka (to Szombathely)
11	FW	SVK	Zoltán Harsányi (loan to (Slovakia) Spartak Myjava)
13	MF	HUN	Dávid Pákolicz (to Nyíregyháza)
17	DF	HUN	Csaba Regedei (to Gyirmót)
19	FW	HUN	Szabolcs Gyánó (to Sopron)
21	MF	MNE	Marko Šćepanović (to (Montenegro) Mladost Podgorica)
27	MF	HUN	István Eszlátyi (to BKV Előre)
28	DF	SRB	Nenad Todorović (to (Serbia) Novi Pazar)
30	DF	ROU	Sabin-Cosmin Goia
31	GK	HUN	Ádám Holczer (to Gyirmót)
33	MF	GEO	Irakli Kvekveskiri (to (Georgia (country)) Dinamo Batumi)
36	DF	SRB	Marko Marović (to (Romania) Recaş)
61	DF	HUN	Gábor Simonfalvi (to Zalaegerszeg)
TBA	MF	HUN	Viktor Városi (loan to Kozármisleny)

=== Winter ===
In: Note: Flags indicate national team as defined under FIFA eligibility rules; some limited exceptions apply. Players may hold more than one non-FIFA nationality.

No.	Pos.	Nation	Player
4	DF	HUN	József Nagy (loan return from Kozármisleny)
6	DF	HUN	Béla Balogh (from Kecskemét)
9	FW	HUN	Krisztián Koller (from Kozármisleny)
20	DF	HUN	Pál Lázár (free agent)
99	FW	HUN	Attila Simon (from Paks)

Out: Note: Flags indicate national team as defined under FIFA eligibility rules; some limited exceptions apply. Players may hold more than one non-FIFA nationality.

No.	Pos.	Nation	Player
8	DF	SLO	Leon Panikvar (to (Slovenia) Aluminij)
14	MF	HUN	Dominik Nagy (loan to Kozármisleny)
22	DF	HUN	László Bodnár (to Nyíregyháza)
27	MF	HUN	Gábor Demjén (to Balmazújváros)
81	FW	HUN	Péter Bajzát (to Nyíregyháza)

- List of Hungarian football transfers summer 2012
- List of Hungarian football transfers winter 2012–13

== Statistics ==
=== Appearances and goals ===
Last updated on 2 June 2013.

No.	Pos	Nat	Player	Total		OTP Bank Liga		Hungarian Cup		League Cup	
No.	Pos	Nat	Player	Apps	Goals	Apps	Goals	Apps	Goals	Apps	Goals
5	DF	(Hungary) HUN	Ferenc Fodor	25	0	15	0	2	0	8	0
6	DF	(Hungary) HUN	Béla Balogh	11	0	9	0	0	0	2	0
7	FW	(Hungary) HUN	Dávid Wittrédi	37	9	29	6	2	0	6	3
8	MF	(Hungary) HUN	Dávid Márkvárt	13	1	7	1	0	0	6	0
9	FW	(Hungary) HUN	Krisztián Koller	14	3	11	1	0	0	3	2
10	MF	(Hungary) HUN	Olivér Nagy	27	1	21	0	1	0	5	1
11	FW	(Serbia) SRB	Miroslav Grumić	33	10	27	6	0	0	6	4
12	GK	(Hungary) HUN	Dénes Dibusz	32	-51	29	-44	0	0	3	-7
13	MF	(Hungary) HUN	Lóránd Szatmári	27	4	17	1	1	0	9	3
16	GK	(Romania) ROU	András Sánta	10	-13	1	-1	2	-3	7	-9
17	MF	(Hungary) HUN	Adrián Horváth	30	1	22	1	1	0	7	0
18	MF	(Hungary) HUN	Levente Lantos	19	1	12	0	2	0	5	1
20	FW	(Nigeria) NGR	Solomon Okoronkwo	14	6	10	3	2	2	2	1
20	DF	(Hungary) HUN	Pál Lázár	10	1	8	1	0	0	2	0
21	MF	(Slovenia) SLO	Zoran Zeljkovič	26	3	19	2	1	1	6	0
22	FW	(Hungary) HUN	Péter Beke	7	0	7	0	0	0	0	0
24	DF	(Hungary) HUN	Miklós Gaál	10	0	9	0	0	0	1	0
25	DF	(Czech Republic) CZE	Jiří Krejčí	25	2	20	2	0	0	5	0
26	DF	(Croatia) CRO	Andrej Čaušić	27	2	22	2	0	0	5	0
27	MF	(Hungary) HUN	Róbert Kővári	1	0	1	0	0	0	0	0
28	DF	(Ivory Coast) CIV	Jean-Baptiste Akassou	30	0	24	0	0	0	6	0
33	MF	(Nigeria) NGR	Eke Uzoma	35	0	28	0	1	0	6	0
69	FW	(Hungary) HUN	Zsolt Horváth	13	1	9	0	0	0	4	1
82	MF	(Serbia) SRB	Aleksandar Stoimirović	9	1	4	0	2	0	3	1
99	FW	(Hungary) HUN	Attila Simon	17	3	13	3	0	0	4	0
Youth players:
15	DF	(Hungary) HUN	Gergő Gajág	2	0	0	0	0	0	2	0
20	MF	(Hungary) HUN	Csaba Eröss	3	0	0	0	1	0	2	0
21	MF	(Hungary) HUN	Patrik Gránicz	2	0	0	0	0	0	2	0
24	MF	(Hungary) HUN	Viktor Károly	1	0	0	0	0	0	1	0
25	MF	(Hungary) HUN	László Zelenyánszki	4	0	0	0	1	0	3	0
Players currently out on loan:
14	MF	(Hungary) HUN	Dominik Nagy	7	0	1	0	1	0	5	0
Players no longer at the club:
3	DF	(Croatia) CRO	Luka Vučko	2	0	0	0	1	0	1	0
11	FW	(Slovakia) SVK	Zoltán Harsányi	3	0	3	0	0	0	0	0
8	DF	(Slovenia) SLO	Leon Panikvar	11	1	5	0	2	1	4	0
22	DF	(Hungary) HUN	László Bodnár	13	0	11	0	1	0	1	0
24	FW	(Brazil) BRA	Nicolas Ceolin	6	1	2	0	2	0	2	1
27	MF	(Hungary) HUN	Gábor Demjén	12	0	8	0	1	0	3	0
81	FW	(Hungary) HUN	Péter Bajzát	16	6	14	4	1	2	1	0

=== Top scorers ===
Includes all competitive matches. The list is sorted by shirt number when total goals are equal.

Last updated on 2 June 2013

Position	Nation	Number	Name	OTP Bank Liga	Hungarian Cup	League Cup	Total
1	(Serbia)	11	Miroslav Grumić	6	0	4	10
2	(Hungary)	7	Dávid Wittrédi	6	0	3	9
3	(Hungary)	81	Péter Bajzát	4	2	0	6
4	(Nigeria)	20	Solomon Okoronkwo	3	2	1	6
5	(Hungary)	13	Lóránd Szatmári	1	0	3	4
6	(Hungary)	99	Attila Simon	3	0	0	3
7	(Slovenia)	21	Zoran Zeljkovič	2	1	0	3
8	(Hungary)	9	Krisztián Koller	1	0	2	3
9	(Czech Republic)	25	Jiří Krejčí	2	0	0	2
10	(Croatia)	26	Andrej Čaušić	2	0	0	2
11	(Hungary)	20	Pál Lázár	1	0	0	1
12	(Hungary)	17	Adrián Horváth	1	0	0	1
13	(Hungary)	8	Dávid Márkvárt	1	0	0	1
14	(Slovenia)	8	Leon Panikvar	0	1	0	1
15	(Hungary)	18	Levente Lantos	0	0	1	1
16	(Hungary)	10	Olivér Nagy	0	0	1	1
17	(Brazil)	24	Nicolas Ceolin	0	0	1	1
18	(Serbia)	82	Aleksandar Stoimirović	0	0	1	1
19	(Hungary)	69	Zsolt Horváth	0	0	1	1
/	/	/	Own Goals	0	0	1	1
			TOTALS	33	6	19	58

=== Disciplinary record ===
Includes all competitive matches. Players with 1 card or more included only.

Last updated on 2 June 2013

Position	Nation	Number	Name	OTP Bank Liga		Hungarian Cup		League Cup		Total (Hu Total)	
Position	Nation	Number	Name	Yellow card	Red card	Yellow card	Red card	Yellow card	Red card	Yellow card	Red card
DF	(Hungary)	5	Ferenc Fodor	0	0	0	0	3	0	3 (0)	0 (0)
DF	(Hungary)	6	Béla Balogh	2	1	0	0	0	0	2 (2)	1 (1)
FW	(Hungary)	7	Dávid Wittrédi	5	0	0	0	2	0	7 (5)	0 (0)
DF	(Slovenia)	8	Leon Panikvar	2	0	1	0	1	0	4 (2)	0 (0)
FW	(Hungary)	9	Krisztián Koller	2	0	0	0	2	0	4 (2)	0 (0)
MF	(Hungary)	10	Olivér Nagy	2	0	0	0	1	0	3 (2)	0 (0)
FW	(Serbia)	11	Miroslav Grumić	6	0	0	0	1	1	7 (6)	1 (0)
GK	(Hungary)	12	Dénes Dibusz	1	0	0	0	0	0	1 (1)	0 (0)
MF	(Hungary)	13	Lóránd Szatmári	1	0	0	0	0	0	1 (1)	0 (0)
DF	(Hungary)	15	Gergő Gajág	0	0	0	0	2	0	2 (0)	0 (0)
MF	(Hungary)	17	Adrián Horváth	5	1	1	0	1	0	7 (5)	1 (1)
DF	(Hungary)	18	Levente Lantos	3	1	0	0	1	0	4 (3)	1 (1)
DF	(Hungary)	20	Pál Lázár	3	1	0	0	1	0	4 (3)	1 (1)
FW	(Nigeria)	20	Solomon Okoronkwo	6	0	1	0	0	1	7 (6)	1 (0)
MF	(Slovenia)	21	Zoran Zeljkovič	8	1	0	0	3	0	11 (8)	1 (1)
FW	(Hungary)	22	Péter Beke	1	0	0	0	0	0	1 (1)	0 (0)
DF	(Hungary)	22	László Bodnár	3	0	0	0	1	0	4 (3)	0 (0)
DF	(Hungary)	24	Miklós Gaál	2	0	0	0	0	0	2 (2)	0 (0)
MF	(Hungary)	24	Viktor Király	0	0	0	0	1	0	1 (0)	0 (0)
DF	(Czech Republic)	25	Jiří Krejčí	3	0	0	0	0	0	3 (3)	0 (0)
MF	(Hungary)	25	László Zelenyánszki	0	0	1	0	0	0	1 (0)	0 (0)
DF	(Croatia)	26	Andrej Čaušić	3	0	0	0	2	0	5 (3)	0 (0)
MF	(Hungary)	27	Gábor Demjén	2	2	0	0	0	0	2 (2)	2 (2)
DF	(Ivory Coast)	28	Jean-Baptiste Akassou	7	1	0	0	1	0	8 (7)	1 (1)
MF	(Nigeria)	33	Eke Uzoma	6	0	0	0	3	0	9 (6)	0 (0)
FW	(Hungary)	69	Zsolt Horváth	1	0	0	0	0	0	1 (1)	0 (0)
FW	(Hungary)	81	Péter Bajzát	2	0	0	0	0	0	2 (2)	0 (0)
MF	(Serbia) (Greece)	82	Aleksandar Stoimirović	1	0	1	0	1	0	3 (1)	0 (0)
FW	(Hungary)	99	Attila Simon	1	0	0	0	0	0	1 (1)	0 (0)
			TOTALS	78	8	5	0	27	2	110 (78)	10 (8)

=== Overall ===
Games played	42 (30 OTP Bank Liga, 2 Hungarian Cup and 10 Hungarian League Cup)
Games won	15 (10 OTP Bank Liga, 1 Hungarian Cup and 4 Hungarian League Cup)
Games drawn	10 (7 OTP Bank Liga, 0 Hungarian Cup and 3 Hungarian League Cup)
Games lost	17 (13 OTP Bank Liga, 1 Hungarian Cup and 3 Hungarian League Cup)
Goals scored	58
Goals conceded	63
Goal difference	-5
Yellow cards	110
Red cards	10
Worst discipline	(Slovenia) Zoran Zeljkovič (11 (yellow card) , 1 (red card) )
Best result	5–1 (A) v Csornai SE - Hungarian Cup - 26-09-2012
Worst result	1–4 (A) v Debreceni VSC - OTP Bank Liga - 10-03-2013
Most appearances	(Hungary) Dávid Wittrédi (37 appearances)
Top scorer	(Serbia) Miroslav Grumić (10 goals)
Points	55/126 (44.44%)

Last updated: 2 June 2013

== Nemzeti Bajnokság I ==
=== Matches ===
28 July 2012 1	Paks	2–3	Pécs	Paks, Tolna County
17:00 CEST	Simon 37'; Heffler 71'	(Report)	Wittrédi 31'; Grumić 36'; Zeljkovič 90+2'	Stadium: Stadion PSE; Attendance: 1,500; Referee: (Hungary) Dániel Becséri

4 August 2012 2	Pécs	0–0	Ferencváros	Pécs, Baranya County
20:45 CEST		(Report)		Stadium: Stadion PMFC; Attendance: 5,000; Referee: (Hungary) Mihály Fábián

12 August 2012 3	MTK Budapest	0–0	Pécs	Budapest, Pest County
17:00 CEST		(Report)		Stadium: Hidegkuti Nándor Stadium; Attendance: 1,000; Referee: (Hungary) Viktor Kassai

18 August 2012 4	Pécs	2–3	Debrecen	Pécs, Baranya County
18:30 CEST	Okoronkwo 47'; Krejčí 61'	(Report)	Coulibaly 70' (pen.), 75', 79'	Stadium: Stadion PMFC; Attendance: 4,000; Referee: (Hungary) Sándor Andó-Szabó

25 August 2012 5	Kaposvár	1–1	Pécs	Kaposvár, Somogy County
16:00 CEST	Haruna 90+3'	(Report)	Wittrédi 34'	Stadium: Stadion Kaposvár Rákóczi; Attendance: 2,500; Referee: (Hungary) Ádám Farkas

31 August 2012 6	Pécs	0–1	Kecskemét	Pécs, Baranya County
17:00 CEST		(Report)	Balázs 83'	Stadium: Stadion PMFC; Attendance: 1,000; Referee: (Hungary) Zoltán Iványi

16 September 2012 7	Győr	1–0	Pécs	Győr, Győr-Moson-Sopron County
16:30 CEST	Koltai 35' (pen.)	(Report)		Stadium: ETO Park; Attendance: 3,500; Referee: (Hungary) Ádám Németh

22 September 2012 8	Pápa	1–2	Pécs	Pápa, Veszprém County
18:30 CEST	Benko 90'	(Report)	Krejčí 9'; Bajzát 84'	Stadium: Stadion Várkerti; Attendance: 1,500; Referee: (Hungary) József Berger

30 September 2012 9	Pécs	1–3	Újpest	Pécs, Baranya County
18:30 CEST	Grumić 5'	(Report)	Simon 6'; Kabát 43'; Vasiljević 72'	Stadium: Stadion PMFC; Attendance: 3,000; Referee: (Hungary) Péter Solymosi

5 October 2012 10	Budapest Honvéd	0–1	Pécs	Budapest, Pest County
17:00 CEST		(Report)	Okoronkwo 9'	Stadium: Bozsik Stadion; Attendance: 1,000; Referee: (Hungary) Gábor Oláh

20 October 2012 11	Pécs	0–0	Eger	Pécs, Baranya County
18:30 CEST		(Report)		Stadium: Stadion PMFC; Attendance: 2,000; Referee: (Hungary) Krisztián Pánczél

27 October 2012 12	Szombathely	1–1	Pécs	Szombathely, Vas County
16:00 CEST	Kenesei 84' (pen.)	(Report)	Čaušić 75'	Stadium: Rohonci Street Stadium; Attendance: 4,500; Referee: (Hungary) István Vad

3 November 2012 13	Pécs	2–1	Siófok	Pécs, Baranya County
16:00 CET	Bajzát 30'; Okoronkwo 79'	(Report)	Pál 17'	Stadium: Stadion PMFC; Attendance: 1,500; Referee: (Hungary) Gergely Szőts

9 November 2012 14	Diósgyőr	1–1	Pécs	Miskolc, Borsod-Abaúj-Zemplén County
17:00 CET	Luque 88' (pen.)	(Report)	Wittrédi 66'	Stadium: DVTK Stadion; Attendance: 6,000; Referee: (Hungary) Viktor Kassai

17 November 2012 15	Pécs	0–0	Videoton	Pécs, Baranya County
18:30 CET		(Report)		Stadium: Stadion PMFC; Attendance: 2,500; Referee: (Hungary) Sándor Andó-Szabó

23 November 2012 16	Pécs	1–3	Paks	Pécs, Baranya County
19:00 CET	Bajzát 90'	(Report)	Eppel 34', 69'; Kulcsár 38'	Stadium: Stadion PMFC; Attendance: 3,000; Referee: (Hungary) Roland Veizer

2 December 2012 17	Ferencváros	3–2	Pécs	Budapest, Pest County
18:30 CET	Böde 70', 90+4'; Perić 78'	(Report)	Wittrédi 39'; Bajzát 48'	Stadium: Stadion Albert Flórián; Attendance: 5,588; Referee: (Hungary) Ádám Farkas

1 March 2013 18	Pécs	2–1	MTK Budapest	Pécs, Baranya County
17:00 CET	Zeljkovič 8'; Grumić 25'	(Report)	Ladányi 36'	Stadium: Stadion PMFC; Attendance: 2,500; Referee: (Hungary) Péter Solymosi

10 March 2013 19	Debrecen	4–1	Pécs	Debrecen, Hajdú-Bihar County
18:30 CET	Pölöskey 31'; Sidibe 64', 89'; Szakály 84' (pen.)	(Report)	Grumić 15'	Stadium: Stadion Oláh Gábor Út; Attendance: 1,500; Referee: (Hungary) Ádám Németh

9 April 2013 20	Pécs	0–2	Kaposvár	Pécs, Baranya County
16:00 CEST		(Report)	Waltner 49'; Pavlović 61'	Stadium: Stadion PMFC; Attendance: 1,800; Referee: (Hungary) István Vad

30 March 2013 21	Kecskemét	0–2	Pécs	Kecskemét, Bács-Kiskun County
16:00 CET		(Report)	Grumić 56'; Simon 82'	Stadium: Széktói Stadion; Attendance: 2,000; Referee: (Hungary) Roland Veizer

5 April 2013 22	Pécs	0–2	Győr	Pécs, Baranya County
19:00 CEST		(Report)	Trajković 12'; Kronaveter 29'	Stadium: Stadion PMFC; Attendance: 2,000; Referee: (Hungary) Tamás Bognár

13 April 2013 23	Pécs	2–0	Pápa	Pécs, Baranya County
16:00 CEST	Čaušić 27'; Lázár 67'	(Report)		Stadium: Stadion PMFC; Attendance: 600; Referee: (Hungary) Zoltán Iványi

19 April 2013 24	Újpest	4–2	Pécs	Budapest, Pest County
19:00 CEST	Kabát 2', 7' (pen.); Moraes 19'; Vasiljević 79'	(Report)	Wittrédi 35'; Simon 81'	Stadium: Szusza Ferenc Stadium; Attendance: 2,680; Referee: (Hungary) Ádám Farkas

28 April 2013 25	Pécs	0–3	Budapest Honvéd	Pécs, Baranya County
18:30 CEST		(Report)	Lanzafame 20'; Martínez 52' (pen.), 56'	Stadium: Stadion PMFC; Attendance: 2,460; Referee: (Hungary) Péter Solymosi

4 May 2013 26	Eger	2–3	Pécs	Vác, Pest County
16:00 CEST	Lasimant 14'; Gaál 90+1' (o.g.)	(Report)	Simon 23'; Horváth 45'; Wittrédi 63'	Stadium: Stadion Városi Vác; Attendance: 67; Referee: (Hungary) Dániel Becséri

11 May 2013 27	Pécs	0–2	Szombathely	Pécs, Baranya County
16:00 CEST		(Report)	Radó 81', 85' (pen.)	Stadium: Stadion PMFC; Attendance: 800; Referee: (Hungary) Sándor Andó-Szabó

18 May 2013 28	Siófok	1–0	Pécs	Siófok, Somogy County
16:00 CEST	Windecker 70'	(Report)		Stadium: Révész Street Stadium; Attendance: 400; Referee: (Hungary) Gábor Oláh

27 May 2013 29	Pécs	2–1	Diósgyőr	Pécs, Baranya County
18:30 CEST	Grumić 1'; Szatmári 19'	(Report)	Rudolf 46'	Stadium: Stadion PMFC; Attendance: 1,000; Referee: (Hungary) József Berger

1 June 2013 30	Videoton	1–2	Pécs	Székesfehérvár, Fejér County
18:30 CEST	Nikolić 3'	(Report)	Márkvárt 66'; Koller 75'	Stadium: Stadion Sóstói; Attendance: 1,800; Referee: (Hungary) Ádám Németh

=== Classification ===
Pos	Team	Pld	W	D	L	GF	GA	GD	Pts
10	Diósgyőr	30	9	11	10	31	39	−8	38
11	Kaposvári Rákóczi	30	10	7	13	35	38	−3	37
12	Pécs	30	10	7	13	33	44	−11	37
13	Paks	30	8	11	11	40	38	+2	35
14	Pápa	30	7	7	16	26	46	−20	28

Source: mlsz.hu (in Hungarian)
Rules for classification: 1st points; 2nd overall wins; 3rd goal difference; 4th head-to-head points; 5th head-to-head goal difference; 6th head-to-head away goals scored; 7th fair-play points; 8th drawing of lots

=== Results summary ===
Overall								Home						Away					
Pld	W	D	L	GF	GA	GD	Pts	W	D	L	GF	GA	GD	W	D	L	GF	GA	GD
30	10	7	13	33	44	−11	37	4	3	8	12	22	−10	6	4	5	21	22	−1

Last updated: 2 June 2013.
Source: NB1

=== Results by round ===
Round	1	2	3	4	5	6	7	8	9	10	11	12	13	14	15	16	17	18	19	20	21	22	23	24	25	26	27	28	29	30
Ground	A	H	A	H	A	H	A	A	H	A	H	A	H	A	H	H	A	H	A	H	A	H	H	A	H	A	H	A	H	A
Result	W	D	D	L	D	L	L	W	L	W	D	D	W	D	D	L	L	W	L	L	W	L	W	L	L	W	L	L	W	W
Position	4	4	7	10	9	11	12	10	11	10	10	11	10	10	11	14	14	12	13	14	13	13	13	13	13	13	13	13	13	12

Updated to match(es) played on 2 June 2013. Source: Matches
A = Away; H = Home; W = Win; D = Draw; L = Loss

== Hungarian Cup ==
26 September 2012 Round 2	Csorna	1–5	Pécs	Csorna, Győr-Moson-Sopron County
15:30 CEST	Molnár 52'	(Report)	Bajzát 23', 28'; Okoronkwo 39', 73'; Zeljkovič 77'	Stadium: Városi Stadion; Attendance: 300; Referee: (Hungary) Norbert Kiss

31 October 2012 Round 3	Tiszaújváros	2–1	Pécs	Tiszaújváros, Borsod-Abaúj-Zemplén County
12:30 CET	Kovács 41'; Dávid 60'	(Report)	Panikvar 67'	Stadium: Városi Stadion; Attendance: 600; Referee: (Hungary) Ádám Farkas

== League Cup ==
=== Group stage ===
5 September 2012 1	Paks	2–1	Pécs	Paks, Tolna County
16:00 CEST	Sifter 14'; Vayer 53' (pen.)	(Report)	Lantos 9'	Stadium: Stadion PSE; Attendance: 200; Referee: (Hungary) Zoltán J. Kovács

8 September 2012 2	Pécs	1–1	Siófok	Pécs, Baranya County
18:00 CEST	Nagy 78'	(Report)	Zamostny 51'	Stadium: Stadion PMFC; Attendance: 300; Referee: (Hungary) Gyöngyi Gaál

10 October 2012 3	Vasas	1–1	Pécs	Budapest, Pest County
16:00 CEST	Mundi 61'	(Report)	Ceolin 88'	Stadium: Stadion Rudolf Illovszky; Attendance: 300; Referee: (Hungary) Norbert Kiss

17 October 2012 4	Pécs	2–1	Vasas	Pécs, Baranya County
18:00 CEST	Stoimirović 1'; Szatmári 15'	(Report)	Gajág 81' (o.g.)	Stadium: Stadion PMFC; Attendance: 300; Referee: (Hungary) József Erdős

13 November 2012 5	Siófok	1–4	Pécs	Siófok, Somogy County
17:00 CET	Mogyorósi 29'	(Report)	Szatmári 6'; Okoronkwo 20'; Grumić 54', 75'	Stadium: Révész Street Stadium; Attendance: 200; Referee: (Hungary) Szabolcs Szilasi

5 December 2012 6	Pécs	2–0	Paks	Pécs, Baranya County
13:00 CET	Wittrédi 8' (pen.); Grumić 73'	(Report)		Stadium: Stadion PMFC; Attendance: 70; Referee: (Hungary) Gábor Oláh

==== Classification ====
Pos	Team	Pld	W	D	L	GF	GA	GD	Pts	Qualification
1	Pécs	6	3	2	1	11	6	+5	11	Advance to knockout phase
2	Paks	6	2	2	2	7	6	+1	8	
3	Vasas	6	2	1	3	5	9	−4	7	
4	Siófok	6	1	3	2	5	7	−2	6	

Rules for classification: 1) points; 2) goal difference; 3) number of goals scored.

=== Knockout phase ===
20 February 2013 Quarter-final (1st leg)	Pécs	3–2	Budapest Honvéd	Pécs, Baranya County
17:00 CET	Grumić 8'; Wittrédi 77', 89'	(Report)	Diarra 33'; Lanzafame 72'	Stadium: Stadion PMFC; Attendance: 300; Referee: (Hungary) István Vad

6 March 2013 Quarter-final (2nd leg)	Budapest Honvéd	3–3 (5–6 agg.)	Pécs	Budapest, Pest County
18:00	Diarra 18'; Živanović 22'; Martínez 51'	(Report)	Koller 16'; Horváth 48'; Szatmári 61'	Stadium: Bozsik Stadion; Attendance: 300; Referee: (Hungary) József Berger

21 March 2013 Semi-final (1st leg)	Videoton	3–1	Pécs	Székesfehérvár, Fejér County
17:15	Paraiba 12'; Mitrović 19'; Nikolić 55'	(Report)	Vinícius 4' (o.g.)	Stadium: Stadion Sóstói; Attendance: 1,000; Referee: (Hungary) Zoltán Iványi

24 March 2013 Semi-final (2nd leg)	Pécs	1–2 (2–5 agg.)	Videoton	Pécs, Baranya County
18:00 CET	Koller 18'	(Report)	Nikolić 77'; Mitrović 90'	Stadium: Stadion PMFC; Attendance: 1,000; Referee: (Hungary) József Erdős
