= 2011–12 Pécsi MFC season =

Pécs
2011–12 season
- Chairman: Dezső Matyi
- Manager: Ferenc Mészáros (until 2 April 2012); Olivér Mink
- Nemzeti Bajnokság I: 7th
- Hungarian Cup: Round of 16
- Hungarian League Cup: Group stage
- Top goalscorer: League: Péter Bajzát (9); All: Péter Bajzát (11)
- Highest home attendance: 9,000 v FTC (11 March 2012)
- Lowest home attendance: 200 v Siófok (12 October 2011)
Home colours	Away colours

The 2011–12 season will be Pécsi Mecsek Football Club's 47th competitive season, 1st consecutive season in the OTP Bank Liga and 61st year in existence as a football club.

== First team squad ==
Note: Flags indicate national team as defined under FIFA eligibility rules; some limited exceptions apply. Players may hold more than one non-FIFA nationality.

No.	Pos.	Nation	Player
2	FW	HUN	Roland Frőhlich (on loan from MTK)
3	DF	BIH	Vlado Marković
4	DF	HUN	József Nagy
5	MF	GHA	Samuel Ato
6	MF	CRO	Goran Paracki
7	MF	SLO	Zoran Zeljkovič
9	FW	HUN	Péter Andorka
10	MF	HUN	Olivér Nagy
11	MF	HUN	Gábor Demjén
12	GK	HUN	Dénes Dibusz
14	MF	HUN	Dominik Nagy
17	DF	HUN	Csaba Regedei
18	MF	HUN	Levente Lantos

No.	Pos.	Nation	Player
20	FW	NGR	Solomon Okoronkwo
21	MF	MNE	Marko Šćepanović
24	FW	HUN	Tamás Turi
26	DF	CRO	Andrej Čaušić
28	DF	SRB	Nenad Todorović
30	DF	ROU	Sabin-Cosmin Goia
33	MF	GEO	Irakli Kvekveskiri
36	DF	SRB	Marko Marović
61	DF	HUN	Gábor Simonfalvi
69	FW	HUN	Zsolt Horváth
77	MF	BIH	Adnan Hrelja
81	FW	HUN	Péter Bajzát

== Transfers ==
=== Summer ===
In: Note: Flags indicate national team as defined under FIFA eligibility rules; some limited exceptions apply. Players may hold more than one non-FIFA nationality.

No.	Pos.	Nation	Player
2	FW	HUN	Roland Frőhlich (loan from MTK Budapest FC)
7	MF	SLO	Zoran Zeljkovič (from (Slovenia) NK Olimpija Ljubljana)
9	FW	HUN	Péter Andorka (from Nyíregyháza Spartacus FC)
11	MF	HUN	Gábor Demjén (from Nyíregyháza Spartacus FC)
13	MF	HUN	Dávid Pákolicz (from Nyíregyháza Spartacus FC)
25	MF	HUN	Zoltán Tóth (from Kozármisleny SE)
26	DF	CRO	Andrej Čaušić (from (Croatia) NK Osijek)
27	DF	HUN	Viktor Petrók (from Kaposvári Rákóczi FC)
30	DF	ROU	Sabin-Cosmin Goia (from Nyíregyháza Spartacus FC)
31	GK	HUN	Ádám Holczer (from Nyíregyháza Spartacus FC)
36	DF	SRB	Marko Marović (from (Georgia (country)) FC Dinamo Tbilisi)
61	DF	HUN	Gábor Simonfalvi (loan return from Zalaegerszegi TE)
81	FW	HUN	Péter Bajzát (from Nyíregyháza Spartacus FC)

Out: Note: Flags indicate national team as defined under FIFA eligibility rules; some limited exceptions apply. Players may hold more than one non-FIFA nationality.

No.	Pos.	Nation	Player
5	MF	HUN	Levente Schultz (unattached)
6	DF	HUN	Ferenc Fodor (loan to Kozármisleny SE)
7	FW	HUN	Dávid Wittrédi (unattached)
11	MF	GHA	Ellis Samuel Ato (loan to Kozármisleny SE)
14	DF	HUN	Péter Stark (to (Austria) Schwadorf ASK)
15	FW	MKD	Aleksandar Stojanovski (to (North Macedonia) FK Teteks)
16	GK	HUN	Csaba Sólyom (loan to Kozármisleny SE)
20	FW	HUN	Gergő Lovrencsics (to Lombard-Pápa TFC)
22	DF	GEO	Irakli Kvekveskiri (loan to Szigetszentmiklósi TK)
26	FW	NGR	Egejuru Godslove (loan to Kozármisleny SE)
27	MF	HUN	István Eszlátyi (loan to Kozármisleny SE)
33	FW	MNE	Stevan Pavićević (unattached)

=== Winter ===
In: Note: Flags indicate national team as defined under FIFA eligibility rules; some limited exceptions apply. Players may hold more than one non-FIFA nationality.

No.	Pos.	Nation	Player
3	DF	BIH	Vlado Marković (from (Albania) Teuta Durrës)
6	DF	HUN	Ferenc Fodor (loan return from Kozármisleny SE)
6	MF	CRO	Goran Paracki (from (Croatia) NK Karlovac)
11	MF	GHA	Ellis Samuel Ato (loan return from Kozármisleny SE)
16	GK	HUN	Csaba Sólyom (loan return from Kozármisleny SE)
20	FW	NGR	Solomon Okoronkwo (from (Norway) Aalesunds FK)
22	DF	GEO	Irakli Kvekveskiri (loan return from Szigetszentmiklósi TK)
26	FW	NGR	Egejuru Godslove (loan return from Kozármisleny SE)
27	MF	HUN	István Eszlátyi (loan return from Kozármisleny SE)
—	FW	SVK	Zoltán Harsányi (from (Slovakia) FK DAC 1904 Dunajská Streda)
—	MF	HUN	Erik Nagy (from Kozármisleny SE)

Out: Note: Flags indicate national team as defined under FIFA eligibility rules; some limited exceptions apply. Players may hold more than one non-FIFA nationality.

No.	Pos.	Nation	Player
6	DF	HUN	Ferenc Fodor (on loan to Kozármisleny SE)
8	DF	HUN	Attila Pintér (on loan to Kozármisleny SE)
13	MF	HUN	Dávid Pákolicz (on loan to Nyíregyháza Spartacus)
13	MF	HUN	Miroszláv Zsdrál (on loan to Kozármisleny SE)
16	GK	HUN	Csaba Sólyom (to Kozármisleny SE)
19	FW	HUN	Szabolcs Gyánó (on loan to Kozármisleny SE)
25	MF	HUN	Zoltán Tóth (to Kozármisleny SE)
26	FW	NGR	Egejuru Godslove (to Dunaújváros Pálhalma SE)
27	MF	HUN	István Eszlátyi (on loan to BKV Előre SC)
27	DF	HUN	Viktor Petrók (to (Austria) Bad Schallerbach)
85	DF	HUN	Tamás Törtei (to Szolnoki MÁV FC)

- List of Hungarian football transfer summer 2011
- List of Hungarian football transfers winter 2011–12

== Statistics ==
=== Appearances and goals ===
Last updated on 27 May 2012.

No.	Pos	Nat	Player	Total		OTP Bank Liga		Hungarian Cup		League Cup	
No.	Pos	Nat	Player	Apps	Goals	Apps	Goals	Apps	Goals	Apps	Goals
2	FW	(Hungary) HUN	Roland Frőhlich	30	2	23	2	4	0	3	0
3	DF	(Bosnia and Herzegovina) BIH	Vlado Marković	6	0	6	0	0	0	0	0
4	DF	(Hungary) HUN	József Nagy	15	0	7	0	2	0	6	0
5	MF	(Ghana) GHA	Samuel Ato	1	0	1	0	0	0	0	0
6	MF	(Croatia) CRO	Goran Paracki	6	0	6	0	0	0	0	0
7	MF	(Slovenia) SLO	Zoran Zeljkovič	23	2	15	0	4	2	4	0
9	FW	(Hungary) HUN	Péter Andorka	30	5	21	4	3	0	6	1
10	MF	(Hungary) HUN	Olivér Nagy	26	5	23	4	1	1	2	0
11	MF	(Hungary) HUN	Gábor Demjén	24	1	15	0	3	0	6	1
12	GK	(Hungary) HUN	Dénes Dibusz	32	-52	30	-50	2	-2	0	0
14	MF	(Hungary) HUN	Dominik Nagy	2	0	2	0	0	0	0	0
17	DF	(Hungary) HUN	Csaba Regedei	31	2	23	1	3	1	5	0
18	MF	(Hungary) HUN	Levente Lantos	34	1	28	0	3	1	3	0
20	FW	(Nigeria) NGR	Solomon Okoronkwo	7	1	7	1	0	0	0	0
21	MF	(Montenegro) MNE	Marko Šćepanović	31	1	24	0	4	0	3	1
24	FW	(Hungary) HUN	Tamás Turi	5	0	2	0	1	0	2	0
26	DF	(Croatia) CRO	Andrej Čaušić	15	1	11	1	1	0	3	0
28	DF	(Serbia) SRB	Nenad Todorović	24	1	20	1	2	0	2	0
30	DF	(Romania) ROU	Sabin-Cosmin Goia	15	0	12	0	0	0	3	0
33	MF	(Georgia (country)) GEO	Irakli Kvekveskiri	6	0	6	0	0	0	0	0
36	DF	(Serbia) SRB	Marko Marović	23	0	18	0	3	0	2	0
61	DF	(Hungary) HUN	Gábor Simonfalvi	33	1	27	0	3	0	3	1
69	FW	(Hungary) HUN	Zsolt Horváth	31	7	26	6	2	0	3	1
77	MF	(Bosnia and Herzegovina) BIH	Adnan Hrelja	1	0	1	0	0	0	0	0
81	FW	(Hungary) HUN	Péter Bajzát	31	13	24	11	3	0	4	2
Youth players
1	GK	(Hungary) HUN	József Strublics	5	-3	0	0	2	-2	3	-1
6	MF	(Hungary) HUN	Dávid Nagy	1	0	0	0	0	0	1	0
14	DF	(Hungary) HUN	Patrik Czibere	1	0	0	0	0	0	1	0
31	GK	(Hungary) HUN	Ádám Holczer	4	-5	0	0	0	0	4	-5
Players currently out on loan
3	MF	(Hungary) HUN	Miroszláv Zsrdál	2	0	0	0	0	0	2	0
8	DF	(Hungary) HUN	Attila Pintér	19	1	13	1	2	0	4	0
13	MF	(Hungary) HUN	Dávid Pákolicz	10	2	1	0	3	1	6	1
19	FW	(Hungary) HUN	Szabolcs Gyánó	17	3	13	2	1	1	3	0
Players no longer at the club
5	MF	(Hungary) HUN	Levente Schultz	1	0	1	0	0	0	0	0
7	FW	(Hungary) HUN	Dávid Wittrédi	3	0	3	0	0	0	0	0
25	MF	(Hungary) HUN	Zoltán Tóth	5	1	1	0	1	0	3	1
27	DF	(Hungary) HUN	Viktor Petrók	10	1	3	1	2	0	5	0
85	DF	(Hungary) HUN	Tamás Törtei	9	1	6	0	1	1	2	0

=== Top scorers ===
Includes all competitive matches. The list is sorted by shirt number when total goals are equal.

Last updated on 27 May 2012

Position	Nation	Number	Name	OTP Bank Liga	Hungarian Cup	League Cup	Total
1	(Hungary)	81	Péter Bajzát	11	0	2	13
2	(Hungary)	69	Zsolt Horváth	6	0	1	7
3	(Hungary)	10	Olivér Nagy	4	1	0	5
4	(Hungary)	9	Péter Andorka	4	0	1	5
5	(Hungary)	19	Szabolcs Gyánó	2	1	0	3
6	(Hungary)	2	Roland Frőhlich	2	0	0	2
7	(Hungary)	17	Csaba Regedei	1	1	0	2
8	(Slovenia)	7	Zoran Zeljkovič	0	2	0	2
9	(Hungary)	13	Dávid Pákolicz	0	1	1	2
10	(Serbia)	28	Nenad Todorović	1	0	0	1
11	(Hungary)	8	Attila Pintér	1	0	0	1
12	(Hungary)	27	Viktor Petrók	1	0	0	1
13	(Croatia)	26	Andrej Čaušić	1	0	0	1
14	(Nigeria)	20	Solomon Okoronkwo	1	0	0	1
15	(Hungary)	85	Tamás Törtei	0	1	0	1
16	(Hungary)	18	Levente Lantos	0	1	0	1
17	(Hungary)	25	Zoltán Tóth	0	0	1	1
18	(Hungary)	11	Gábor Demjén	0	0	1	1
19	(Hungary)	61	Gábor Simonfalvi	0	0	1	1
20	(Montenegro)	21	Marko Šćepanović	0	0	1	1
/	/	/	Own Goals	1	0	1	2
			TOTALS	35	8	10	53

=== Disciplinary record ===
Includes all competitive matches. Players with 1 card or more included only.

Last updated on 27 May 2012

Position	Nation	Number	Name	OTP Bank Liga		Hungarian Cup		League Cup		Total (Hu Total)	
Position	Nation	Number	Name	Yellow card	Red card	Yellow card	Red card	Yellow card	Red card	Yellow card	Red card
FW	(Hungary)	2	Roland Frőhlich	4	0	2	0	0	0	6 (4)	0 (0)
DF	(Bosnia and Herzegovina)	3	Vlado Marković	4	0	0	0	0	0	4 (4)	0 (0)
DF	(Hungary)	4	József Nagy	0	0	1	0	1	0	2 (0)	0 (0)
MF	(Croatia)	6	Goran Paracki	1	0	0	0	0	0	1 (1)	0 (0)
MF	(Slovenia)	7	Zoran Zeljkovič	2	0	3	0	1	0	6 (2)	0 (0)
DF	(Hungary)	8	Attila Pintér	5	0	0	0	1	0	6 (5)	0 (0)
FW	(Hungary)	9	Péter Andorka	3	0	0	0	0	0	3 (3)	0 (0)
MF	(Hungary)	10	Olivér Nagy	5	0	0	0	0	0	5 (5)	0 (0)
MF	(Hungary)	11	Gábor Demjén	3	0	0	0	0	0	3 (3)	0 (0)
GK	(Hungary)	12	Dénes Dibusz	3	0	0	0	0	0	3 (3)	0 (0)
MF	(Hungary)	13	Dávid Pákolicz	0	0	0	0	1	0	1 (0)	0 (0)
DF	(Hungary)	17	Csaba Regedei	2	0	0	0	1	0	3 (2)	0 (0)
MF	(Hungary)	18	Levente Lantos	3	0	0	0	0	0	3 (3)	0 (0)
FW	(Hungary)	19	Szabolcs Gyánó	3	0	1	0	1	0	5 (3)	0 (0)
FW	(Nigeria)	20	Solomon Okoronkwo	2	0	0	0	0	0	2 (2)	0 (0)
MF	(Montenegro)	21	Marko Šćepanović	8	0	2	0	0	0	10 (8)	0 (0)
MF	(Hungary)	25	Zoltán Tóth	0	0	0	0	1	0	1 (0)	0 (0)
DF	(Croatia)	26	Andrej Čaušić	2	0	0	0	0	0	2 (2)	0 (0)
DF	(Hungary)	27	Viktor Petrók	1	0	0	0	0	0	1 (1)	0 (0)
DF	(Serbia)	28	Nenad Todorović	9	0	2	0	0	0	11 (9)	0 (0)
DF	(Romania)	30	Sabin-Cosmin Goia	1	0	0	0	1	0	2 (1)	0 (0)
GK	(Hungary)	31	Ádám Holczer	0	0	0	0	0	1	0 (0)	1 (0)
MF	(Georgia (country))	33	Irakli Kvekveskiri	1	0	0	0	0	0	1 (1)	0 (0)
DF	(Serbia)	36	Marko Marović	5	0	0	0	0	0	5 (5)	0 (0)
DF	(Hungary)	61	Gábor Simonfalvi	5	0	2	0	1	0	8 (5)	0 (0)
FW	(Hungary)	69	Zsolt Horváth	1	0	0	0	0	0	1 (1)	0 (0)
FW	(Hungary)	81	Péter Bajzát	4	1	1	0	1	0	6 (4)	1 (1)
DF	(Hungary)	85	Tamás Törtei	2	0	1	0	0	0	3 (2)	0 (0)
			TOTALS	79	1	15	0	10	1	104 (79)	2 (1)

=== Overall ===
Games played	40 (30 OTP Bank Liga, 4 Hungarian Cup and 6 Hungarian League Cup)
Games won	14 (8 OTP Bank Liga, 3 Hungarian Cup and 3 Hungarian League Cup)
Games drawn	11 (10 OTP Bank Liga, 0 Hungarian Cup and 1 Hungarian League Cup)
Games lost	15 (12 OTP Bank Liga, 1 Hungarian Cup and 2 Hungarian League Cup)
Goals scored	54
Goals conceded	60
Goal difference	-6
Yellow cards	104
Red cards	2
Worst discipline	(Serbia) Nenad Todorović (11 (yellow card) , 0 (red card) )
Best result	5–1 (H) v Vasas SC - OTP Bank Liga - 26-11-2011
Worst result	0–4 (A) v Diósgyőri VTK - OTP Bank Liga - 16-10-2011
Worst result	0–4 (A) v Debreceni VSC - OTP Bank Liga - 12-05-2012
Most appearances	(Hungary) Levente Lantos (34 appearances)
Top scorer	(Hungary) Péter Bajzát (13 goal)
Points	53/120 (44.17%)

Last updated: 27 May 2012

== Nemzeti Bajnokság I ==
=== Matches ===
16 July 2011 1	Pécsi Mecsek FC	1–0	Szombathelyi Haladás	Pécs, Baranya County
19:00 CET (UTC+01)	Horváth 80'	(Report)		Stadium: Stadion PMFC; Attendance: 2,500; Referee: (Hungary) Ádám Németh

23 July 2011 2	Vasas SC	1–2	Pécsi Mecsek FC	Budapest, Pest County
17:30 CET (UTC+01)	Gašpar 50'	(Report)	Horváth 49'; Nagy 70'	Stadium: Stadion Rudolf Illovszky; Attendance: 2,600; Referee: (Hungary) Ádám Radványi

30 July 2011 3	Pécsi Mecsek FC	2–1	Zalaegerszegi TE	Pécs, Baranya County
19:00 CET (UTC+01)	Horváth 23'; Gyánó 80' (pen.)	(Report)	Kamber 37'	Stadium: Stadion PMFC; Attendance: 3,000; Referee: (Hungary) Zoltán J. Kovács

7 August 2011 4	Ferencvárosi TC	0–1	Pécsi Mecsek FC	Budapest, Pest County
16:00 CET (UTC+01)		(Report)	Nagy 83'	Stadium: Stadion Albert Flórián; Attendance: 4,000; Referee: (Hungary) Mihly Fábián

13 August 2011 5	Pécsi Mecsek FC	2–2	Kecskeméti TE	Pécs, Baranya County
19:00 CET (UTC+01)	Bajzát 21'; Todorović 24'	(Report)	Gyurcsó 36' 85'	Stadium: Stadion PMFC; Attendance: 4,000; Referee: (Hungary) Zoltán Iványi

20 August 2011 6	Videoton FC	4–1	Pécsi Mecsek FC	Székesfehérvár, Fejér County
17:30 CET (UTC+01)	Alves 17' (pen.); Elek 25'; Brandão 69'; Nikolić 90'	(Report)	Pintér 23'	Stadium: Sóstói Stadion; Attendance: 3,200; Referee: (Hungary) Tamás Bognár

27 August 2011 7	Pécsi Mecsek FC	2–1	Lombard-Pápa TFC	Pécs, Baranya County
19:00 CET (UTC+01)	Horváth 38'; Frőhlich 45'	(Report)	Ganugrava 12'	Stadium: Stadion PMFC; Attendance: 4,000; Referee: (Hungary) Ádám Farkas

10 September 2011 8	Újpest FC	4–1	Pécsi Mecsek FC	Budapest, Pest County
15:00 CET (UTC+01)	Dvorschák 13'; Mihajlović 18'; Kabát 85' (pen.); Rajczi 90+2'	(Report)	Andorka 51'	Stadium: Szusza Ferenc Stadium; Attendance: 2,811; Referee: (Hungary) Sándor Andó-Szabó

17 September 2011 9	Pécsi Mecsek FC	1–1	BFC Siófok	Pécs, Baranya County
19:00 CET (UTC+01)	Sowunmi 25' (o.g.)	(Report)	Szabó 60'	Stadium: Stadion PMFC; Attendance: 3,500; Referee: (Hungary) Ádám Radványi

24 September 2011 10	Paksi SE	4–4	Pécsi Mecsek FC	Paks, Tolna County
18:00 CET (UTC+01)	Sifter 22'; Böde 25' 54' 89'	(Report)	Bajzát 18'; Nagy 48' 65'; Petrók 79'	Stadium: Stadion PSE; Attendance: 2,200; Referee: (Hungary) Balázs Böcskei

1 October 2011 11	Pécsi Mecsek FC	1–1	Kaposvári Rákóczi FC	Pécs, Baranya County
18:00 CET (UTC+01)	Andorka 24'	(Report)	Perić 23'	Stadium: Stadion PMFC; Attendance: 3,500; Referee: (Hungary) Tamás Bognár

15 October 2011 12	Diósgyőri VTK	4–0	Pécsi Mecsek FC	Miskolc, Borsod-Abaúj-Zemplén County
18:00 CET (UTC+01)	Budovinszky 26'; Tisza 36' 73'; Gallardo 51'	(Report)		Stadium: DVTK Stadion; Attendance: 9,000; Referee: (Hungary) Roland Veizer

23 October 2011 13	Pécsi Mecsek FC	0–0	Debreceni VSC	Pécs, Baranya County
18:00 CET (UTC+01)		(Report)		Stadium: Stadion PMFC; Attendance: 4,000; Referee: (Hungary) István Vad

29 October 2011 14	Pécsi Mecsek FC	3–1	Győri ETO FC	Pécs, Baranya County
17:00 CET (UTC+01)	Bajzát 22'; Regedei 48'; Gyánó 90'	(Report)	Ahjupera 56'	Stadium: Stadion PMFC; Attendance: 3,500; Referee: (Chile) Alvaro Miquel Garcia

5 November 2011 15	Budapest Honvéd FC	1–1	Pécsi Mecsek FC	Budapest, Pest County
15:00 CET (UTC+01)	Torghelle 90+3'	(Report)	Bajzát 36'	Stadium: Bozsik Stadion; Attendance: 2,500; Referee: (Hungary) Gábor Oláh

19 November 2011 16	Szombathelyi Haladás	0–0	Pécsi Mecsek FC	Szombathely, Vas County
16:00 CET (UTC+01)		(Report)		Stadium: Rohonci Street Stadium; Attendance: 2,500; Referee: (Hungary) Viktor Kassai

26 November 2011 17	Pécsi Mecsek FC	5–1	Vasas SC	Pécs, Baranya County
16:00 CET (UTC+01)	Bajzát 12' 21' 61' 81' 83'	(Report)	Bárányos 27'	Stadium: Stadion PMFC; Attendance: 3,000; Referee: (Hungary) Sándor Andó-Szabó

3 March 2012 18	Zalaegerszegi TE	0–0	Pécsi Mecsek FC	Zalaegerszeg, Zala County
15:00 CET (UTC+01)		(Report)		Stadium: ZTE Arena; Attendance: 3,500; Referee: (Hungary) Ádám Németh

11 March 2012 19	Pécsi Mecsek FC	0–2	Ferencvárosi TC	Pécs, Baranya County
16:00 CET (UTC+01)		(Report)	Jovanović 6'; Pölöskey 90+2'	Stadium: Stadion PMFC; Attendance: 9,000; Referee: (Hungary) Mihály Fábián

17 March 2012 20	Kecskeméti TE	1–2	Pécsi Mecsek FC	Kecskemét, Bács-Kiskun County
16:00 CET (UTC+01)	Lencse 1'	(Report)	Horváth 5'; Andorka 11'	Stadium: Széktói Stadion; Attendance: 2,000; Referee: (Hungary) János Takács

24 March 2012 21	Pécsi Mecsek FC	1–3	Videoton FC	Pécs, Baranya County
17:00 CET (UTC+01)	Andorka 53'	(Report)	Nikolić 13' 69' (pen.); Gyurcsó 40'	Stadium: Stadion PMFC; Attendance: 3,500; Referee: (Hungary) Tamás Bognár

31 March 2012 22	Lombard-Pápa TFC	0–0	Pécsi Mecsek FC	Pápa, Veszprém County
17:00 CET (UTC+01)		(Report)		Stadium: Stadion Várkerti; Attendance: 1,200; Referee: (Hungary) Viktor Kassai

7 April 2012 23	Pécsi Mecsek FC	0–0	Újpest FC	Pécs, Baranya County
18:00 CET (UTC+01)		(Report)		Stadium: Stadion PMFC; Attendance: 2,500; Referee: (Hungary) István Vad

14 April 2012 24	BFC Siófok	2–1	Pécsi Mecsek FC	Siófok, Somogy County
16:00 CET (UTC+01)	Simon 90+1' (pen.); Haraszti 90+5'	(Report)	Horváth 70'	Stadium: Révész Street Stadium; Attendance: 1,000; Referee: (Hungary) Zsolt Szabó

21 April 2012 25	Pécsi Mecsek FC	1–2	Paksi SE	Pécs, Baranya County
18:00 CET (UTC+01)	Bajzát 68'	(Report)	Hrepka 52' 71'	Stadium: Stadion PMFC; Attendance: 4,000; Referee: (Hungary) Tamás Bognár

28 April 2012 26	Kaposvári Rákóczi FC	1–0	Pécsi Mecsek FC	Kaposvár, Somogy County
18:00 CET (UTC+01)	Balázs 48'	(Report)		Stadium: Stadion Kaposvár Rákóczi; Attendance: 2,500; Referee: (Hungary) Ádám Radványi

4 May 2012 27	Pécsi Mecsek FC	1–2	Diósgyőri VTK	Pécs, Baranya County
18:00 CET (UTC+01)	Čaušić 10'	(Report)	Luque 2'; Tisza 45'	Stadium: Stadion PMFC; Attendance: 2,500; Referee: (Hungary) Ádám Németh

12 May 2012 28	Debreceni VSC	4–0	Pécsi MFC	Debrecen, Hajdú-Bihar County
17:30 CET (UTC+01)	Nagy 23' (o.g.); Bouadla 41'; Bódi 44'; Kulcsár 55'	(Report)		Stadium: Stadion Oláh Gábor Út; Attendance: 10,400; Referee: (Hungary) Ádám Farkas

18 May 2012 29	Győri ETO FC	3–0	Pécsi MFC	Győr, Győr-Moson-Sopron County
20:00 CET (UTC+01)	Takács 49'; Koltai 69' (pen.) 85'	(Report)		Stadium: ETO Park; Attendance: 2,500; Referee: (Hungary) Mihály Fábián

26 May 2012 30	Pécsi Mecsek FC	3–4	Budapest Honvéd FC	Pécs, Baranya County
15:00 CET (UTC+01)	Frőhlich 12'; Bajzát 23'; Okoronkwo 51'	(Report)	Tchami 1'; Ivancsics 49' (pen.); Délczeg 52'; Faggyas 61'	Stadium: Stadion PMFC; Attendance: 1,500; Referee: (Hungary) Zsolt Szabó

=== Classification ===
Pos	Team	Pld	W	D	L	GF	GA	GD	Pts
10	Kaposvár	30	7	14	9	35	42	−7	35
11	Ferencváros	30	9	7	14	32	35	−3	34
12	Pécs	30	8	10	12	36	50	−14	34
13	Újpest	30	8	8	14	34	46	−12	32
14	Pápa	30	8	6	16	26	40	−14	30

Source: MLSZ (in Hungarian)
Rules for classification: 1st points; 2nd overall wins; 3rd goal difference; 4th goals scored

=== Results summary ===
Overall								Home						Away					
Pld	W	D	L	GF	GA	GD	Pts	W	D	L	GF	GA	GD	W	D	L	GF	GA	GD
30	8	10	12	36	50	−14	34	5	4	5	22	20	+2	3	6	7	14	30	−16

Last updated: 27 May 2012.
Source: NB1

=== Results by round ===
Round	1	2	3	4	5	6	7	8	9	10	11	12	13	14	15	16	17	18	19	20	21	22	23	24	25	26	27	28	29	30
Ground	H	A	H	A	H	A	H	A	H	A	H	A	H	H	A	A	H	A	H	A	H	A	H	A	H	A	H	A	A	H
Result	W	W	W	W	D	L	W	L	D	D	D	L	D	W	D	D	W	D	L	W	L	D	D	L	L	L	L	L	L	L
Position	6	4	2	2	3	3	3	3	4	5	5	7	7	6	7	7	6	5	5	5	6	6	7	7	8	8	9	10	11	12

Updated to match(es) played on 27 May 2012. Source: Matches
A = Away; H = Home; W = Win; D = Draw; L = Loss

== Hungarian Cup ==
21 September 2011 3	Paksi FC II	0–3	Pécsi Mecsek FC	Paks, Tolna County
15:30		(Report)	Pákolicz 53'; Zeljkovič 57' (pen.); Törtei 76'	Stadium: ASE Sporttelep; Attendance: 150; Referee: (Hungary) Gyöngyi Gaál

26 October 2011 4	Csákvári TK	2–3	Pécsi Mecsek FC	Csákvár, Fejér County
14:00	Rigó 2'; Tornyai 15'	(Report)	Gyánó 9'; Zeljkovič 54'; Lantos 111'	Stadium: Városi Sporttelep; Attendance: 500; Referee: (Hungary) Tibor Farkas

=== Round of 16 ===
30 November 2011 1st leg	MTK Budapest FC	0–1	Pécsi Mecsek FC	Budapest, Pest County
17:30		(Report)	Regedei 66' (pen.)	Stadium: Stadion Hidegkuti Nándor; Attendance: 400; Referee: (Hungary) Zoltán Iványi

3 December 2011 2nd leg	Pécsi Mecsek FC	1–2 (2–2 agg.)	MTK Budapest FC	Pécs, Baranya County
16:00	Nagy 89' (pen.)	(Report)	Vadnai 15'; Németh 68'	Stadium: Stadion PMFC; Attendance: 1,500; Referee: (Hungary) Gábor Oláh

== League Cup ==
=== Matches ===
30 August 2011 1	Pécsi Mecsek FC	1–2	Kaposvári Rákóczi FC	Pécs, Baranya County
18:00	Tóth 57' (pen.)	(Report)	Farkas 6' 79'	Stadium: Stadion PMFC; Attendance: 300; Referee: (Hungary) Dániel Becséri

7 September 2011 2	Ferencvárosi TC	1–4	Pécsi Mecsek FC	Budapest, Pest County
20:00	Nyilasi 30'	(Report)	Bajzát 5'; Andorka 7'; Antal 34' (o.g.); Demjén 65'	Stadium: Stadion Albert Flórián; Attendance: 1,500; Referee: (Hungary) Tibor Farkas

5 October 2011 3	BFC Siófok	0–2	Pécsi Mecsek FC	Siófok, Somogy County
15:00		(Report)	Simonfalvi 59'; Horváth 61'	Stadium: Révész Street Stadium; Attendance: 200; Referee: (Hungary) Gergely Szőts

12 October 2011 4	Pécsi Mecsek FC	1–1	BFC Siófok	Pécs, Baranya County
18:00	Bajzát 45'	(Report)	Sowunmi 21'	Stadium: Stadion PMFC; Attendance: 200; Referee: (Hungary) László Lovas

10 November 2011 5	Pécsi Mecsek FC	2–1	Ferencvárosi TC	Pécs, Baranya County
18:00	Pákolicz 3'; Šćepanović 55'	(Report)	Lisztes 17'	Stadium: Stadion PMFC; Attendance: 400; Referee: (Hungary) Ádám Farkas

15 November 2011 6	Kaposvári Rákóczi FC	1–0	Pécsi Mecsek FC	Kaposvár, Somogy County
16:00	Haruna 69'	(Report)		Stadium: Stadion Kaposvár Rákóczi; Attendance: 300; Referee: (Hungary) József Berger

=== Classification ===
Pos	Team	Pld	W	D	L	GF	GA	GD	Pts	Qualification
1	Kaposvári Rákóczi FC	6	4	1	1	9	5	+4	13	Advance to knockout phase
2	Pécsi Mecsek	6	3	1	2	10	6	+4	10	
3	Siófok	6	3	1	2	7	7	0	10	
4	Ferencvárosi TC	6	0	1	5	6	13	−7	1	

Rules for classification: 1) points; 2) goal difference; 3) number of goals scored.

== Pre Season (Winter) ==
18 January 2012	(Croatia) HNK Cibalia	2–0	Pécsi Mecsek FC	Vinkovci, Croatia
		(Report)		Stadium: Stadion HNK Cibalia

21 January 2012	Pécsi Mecsek FC	5–0	Bajai LSE	Pécs, Baranya County
	Gyánó; Andorka; Regedei; Demjén; Ato	(Report)		Stadium: Stadion PMFC

25 January 2012	Szombathelyi Haladás	1–1	Pécsi Mecsek FC	Siófok, Somogy County
	Regedei	(Report)	Ugrai	Referee: (Hungary) András Horváth

28 January 2012	Budapest Honvéd FC	0–1	Pécsi Mecsek FC	Budapest, Pest County
		(Report)	Zeljkovič 17'	Stadium: Bozsik Stadion; Attendance: 200

8 February 2012	Pécsi Mecsek FC	2–1	Kozármisleny SE	Pécs, Baranya County
	Andorka	(Report)	Wittrédi	Stadium: Stadion PMFC; Referee: (Hungary) Zierkelbach

11 February 2012	Pécsi Mecsek FC	2–0	Pécsvárad	Pécs, Baranya County
	Turi	(Report)		Stadium: Stadion PMFC

11 February 2012	Pécsi Mecsek FC	3–0	Bátaszéki FC	Pécs, Baranya County
	Gyánó; Demjén; Frőhlich	(Report)		Stadium: Stadion PMFC

15 February 2012	(Croatia) HNK Cibalia	2–1	Pécsi Mecsek FC	Vinkovci, Croatia
		(Report)	Zeljkovič	Stadium: Stadion HNK Cibalia

17 February 2012	(Bosnia and Herzegovina) FK Željezničar Sarajevo	0–0	Pécsi Mecsek FC	Vinkovci, Croatia
		(Report)		Stadium: Stadion HNK Cibalia

18 February 2012	(Bosnia and Herzegovina) NK Zvijezda Gradačac	2–1	Pécsi Mecsek FC	Rovinj, Croatia
	Omić; Nuhanović	(Report)	Andorka

25 February 2012	Vasas SC	1–0	Pécsi Mecsek FC	Budapest, Pest County
	Szabó 68'	(Report)		Stadium: Stadion Rudolf Illovszky
