= Hrelja =

Hrelja may refer to:

- Hrelja (protosebastos), 14th-century feudal lord from northeastern Macedonia and the Rila mountains
- Silvano Hrelja (born 1958), Croatian politician
- Adnan Hrelja (born 1993), Bosnian-Herzegovinian footballer

== See also ==
- Hreljac, Croatian noble family
