= Vladimir Marković =

Vladimir Marković may refer to:

- Vladimir Markovic (born 1973), mathematician
- Vlado Marković, Vladimir "Vlado" Marković (born 1985), football player
