= Jiří Krejčí =

Czech footballer

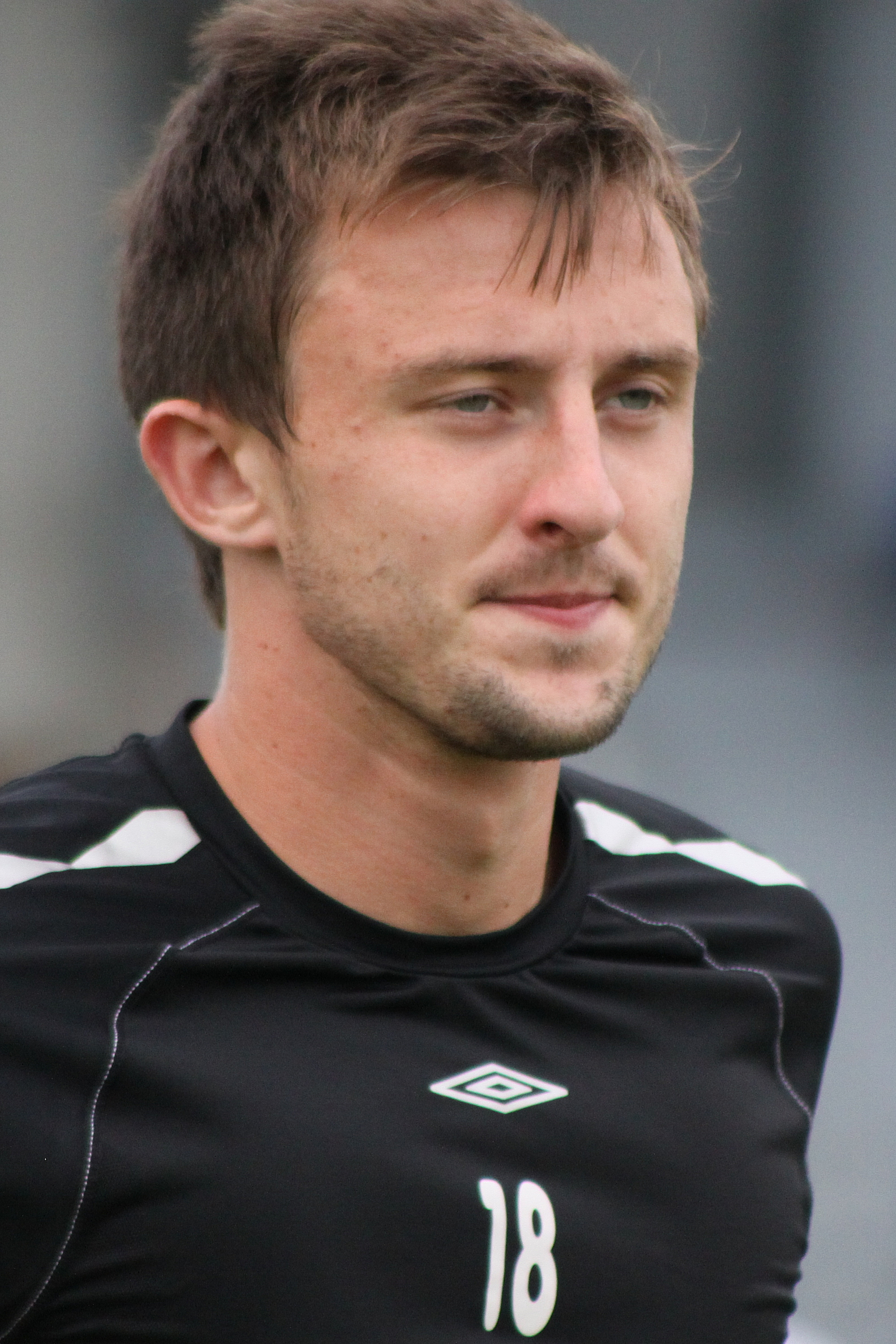

Personal information
- Date of birth: 22 March 1986 (age 40)
- Place of birth: Jablonec, Czechoslovakia
- Height: 1.91 m (6 ft 3 in)
- Position: Centre back

Youth career
- 1994–2004: Sparta Prague

Senior career*
Years	Team	Apps	(Gls)
2004–2006	Chmel Blšany	13	(0)
2006–2007	Baník Most	15	(0)
2007–2010	Jablonec 97	54	(3)
2010–2011	Politehnica Timişoara	0	(0)
2011–2012	Příbram	27	(2)
2012–2013	Pécsi MFC	20	(2)
2013–2018	Vysočina Jihlava	116	(3)
2018–2019	Slovácko	38	(1)

International career
2003	Czech Republic U18	3	(0)
Medal record
Politehnica Timişoara
Runner-up	Liga I	2011
- * Club domestic league appearances and goals

Jiří Krejčí (born 22 March 1986) is a retired footballer from Czech Republic.

== Club career ==
=== Early career ===
Krejčí begun his youth career at Sparta Prague. Then he spent the next years playing for Chmel Blšany and Baník Most.

=== Jablonec 97 ===
Young Krejčí signed Jablonec in 2007. He became regular, finishing as runner-up in 2009–2010 season. Krejčí was the best centre back of Jablonec, but he refused to sign a new contract.

=== Politehnica Timișoara ===
Krejčí made the big step of his career signing for Romanian giants FC Politehnica Timișoara on 15 October for five years. He was handed the number 3. At his presentation at press conference, said : "I am very happy to be here, is an important step in my career. Poli Timișoara is a well known name in the Czech Republic, thanks to Dušan Uhrin. I hope to help the team to back European Cups in the summer. Krejčí left the team on 18 June 2011 after he failed to make an impression and played just for reserves team.
