= Aleksandar Stoimirović =

Serbian former footballer (born 1982)

Personal information
- Full name: Aleksandar Stoimirović
- Date of birth: December 11, 1982 (age 43)
- Place of birth: Kragujevac, SFR Yugoslavia
- Height: 1.79 m (5 ft 10 in)
- Position: Midfielder

Youth career
- 1995–1999: Radnički Kragujevac
- 1999–2001: Milicionar

Senior career*
Years	Team	Apps	(Gls)
2001–2004	Radnički Obrenovac	58	(8)
2003–2004	Nacional	0	(0)
2004–2007	Hajduk Kula	44	(5)
2007–2008	Vorskla Poltava	7	(0)
2008–2009	Chernomorets Burgas	16	(1)
2009–2010	Čukarički	24	(1)
2011	Borac Čačak	13	(1)
2011–2012	Petrolul Ploieşti	18	(1)
2012–2013	Pécs	4	(0)
2013–2014	Radnički Kragujevac	6	(0)
2014	Ermionida	1	(0)
2015–2016	Jagodina	16	(0)
2016	Dinamo Vranje	3	(0)
Total		212	(17)

Managerial career
- 2021: Neftchi Fergana (assistant)
- 2022: Navbahor Namangan (assistant)
- 2023: AGMK (assistant)
- 2024: Lokomotiv Tashkent
- * Club domestic league appearances and goals

Aleksandar Stoimirović (Serbian Cyrillic: Александар Стоимировић; born December 11, 1982) is a Serbian former footballer.

== Career ==
Born in Kragujevac, SR Serbia, SFR Yugoslavia, Stoimirović began his career with Radnički Obrenovac and signed in summer 2004 a contract with Hajduk Kula, after two years here signed in November 2006 for Ukrainian club Vorskla. After just one and a half year left Vorskla and signed in July 2008 for Chernomorets. He joined on 8 October 2009 on trial to FC Schalke 04 and will play in two friendly games.

Later he played with FK Čukarički and FK Borac Čačak in the Serbian SuperLiga, and with FC Petrolul Ploiești and Pécsi Mecsek FC in, respectively, Romanian and Hungarian top leagues. In summer 2013 he returned to Serbia and joined his hometown top flight club FK Radnički 1923.
