= Zoltán Tóth (footballer, born 1983) =

Hungarian footballer

Personal information
- Full name: Zoltán Tóth
- Date of birth: 12 July 1983 (age 43)
- Place of birth: Szekszárd, Hungary
- Height: 1.75 m (5 ft 9 in)
- Position: Midfielder

Team information
- Current team: Kozármisleny SE

Senior career*
Years	Team	Apps	(Gls)
2002–2011	Kozármisleny SE	140	(25)
2006–2007	→ Pécsi Mecsek FC (loan)	12	(0)
2011–2012	Pécsi Mecsek FC	1	(0)
2012–	Kozármisleny SE		
- * Club domestic league appearances and goals as of 31 July 2011

Zoltán Tóth (born 12 July 1983 in Szekszárd) is a Hungarian football player who currently plays for Kozármisleny SE.
