= Nenad Todorović =

Serbian footballer

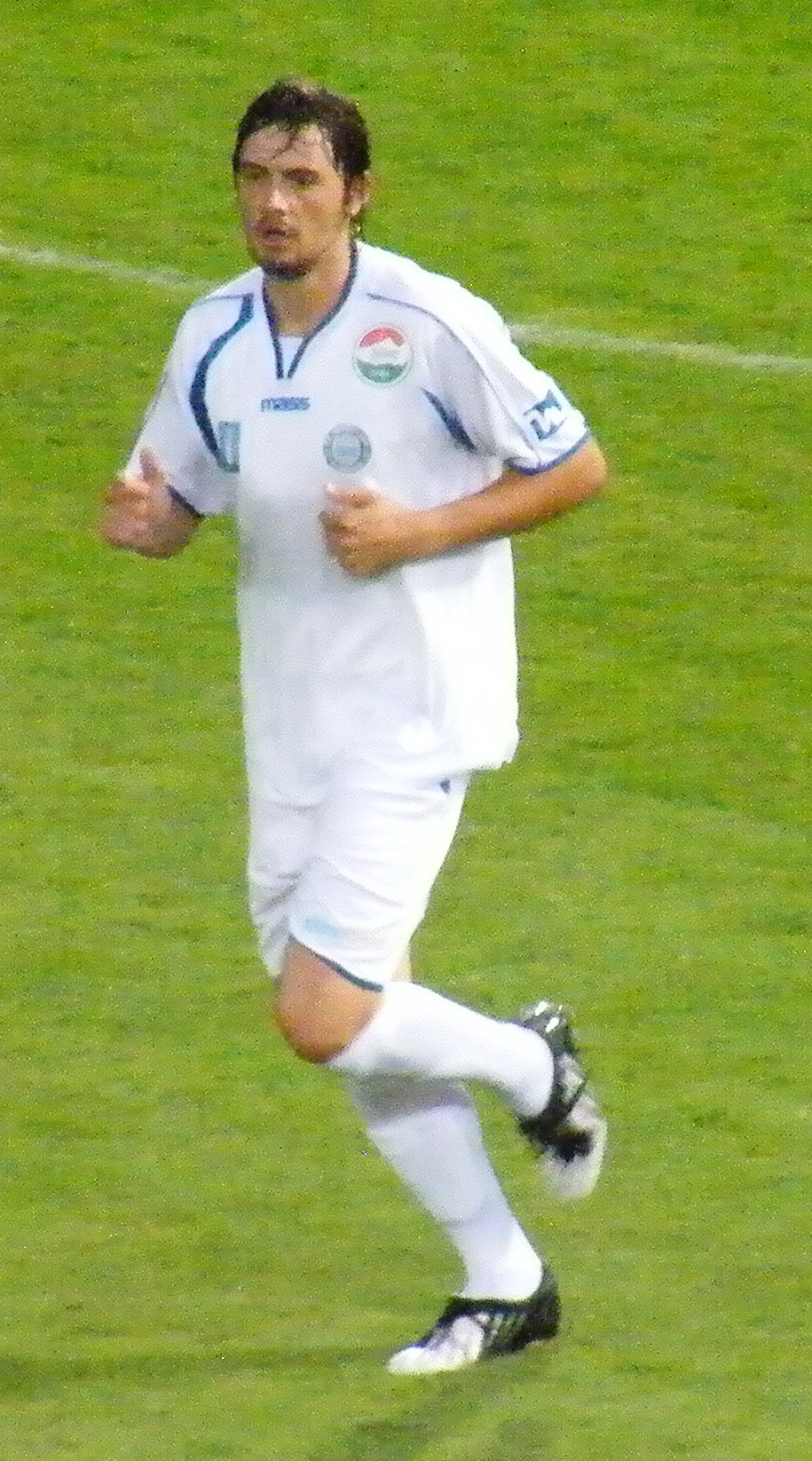

Personal information
- Full name: Nenad Todorović
- Date of birth: 26 May 1982 (age 44)
- Place of birth: Bačka Topola, SFR Yugoslavia
- Height: 1.88 m (6 ft 2 in)
- Position: Centre back

Youth career
- OFK Beograd

Senior career*
Years	Team	Apps	(Gls)
2001–2002	Njegoš Lovćenac		
2002–2003	Mladost Apatin		
2003–2004	ČSK Čelarevo		
2004–2005	Bačka Topola		
2005–2006	Spartak Subotica		
2006–2009	OFK Beograd	45	(2)
2008–2009	→ Hajduk Kula (loan)	3	(1)
2009–2010	Zalaegerszeg	19	(1)
2009–2010	Zalaegerszeg II	5	(0)
2011–2012	Pécs	47	(2)
2011–2012	Pécs II	3	(1)
2012–2017	TSC Bačka Topola	59	(10)
2017–2019	Tisa Adorjan	89	(32)
Total		270	(49)
- * Club domestic league appearances and goals

Nenad Todorović (Serbian Cyrillic: Ненад Тодоровић; born 26 May 1982) is a Serbian retired football defender.

== Career ==
Before moving to Hungary in summer 2009 to play with Zalaegerszegi TE Nenad has played with Serbian SuperLiga clubs OFK Beograd and FK Hajduk Kula.
