= Adnan Hrelja =

Bosnian-Herzegovinian footballer

Personal information
- Full name: Adnan Hrelja
- Date of birth: 10 October 1993 (age 33)
- Place of birth: Sarajevo, Bosnia and Herzegovina
- Position: Left back

Team information
- Current team: Čelik Zenica
- Number: 14

Youth career
- 2007–2012: FK Sarajevo
- 2012–2013: Pécsi Mecsek

Senior career*
Years	Team	Apps	(Gls)
2012–2013	Pécsi Mecsek	1	(0)
2013–2014	FK Sarajevo	4	(0)
2014	→ Rudar Kakanj	13	(0)
2014–2015	→ Mladost Doboj Kakanj	26	(0)
2015–2017	Mladost Doboj Kakanj	15	(0)
2016	→ Bosna Visoko (loan)	13	(1)
2017	Bosna Visoko	15	(0)
2018	FK Sloga Simin Han	8	(0)
2018–2021	Rudar Kakanj	66	(11)
2021-2022	Igman Konjic	27	(2)
2022-2023	GOŠK Gabela	23	(4)
2023-	Čelik Zenica	0	(0)

International career
2011–2012	Bosnia and Herzegovina U-19	4	(1)
- * Club domestic league appearances and goals as of 3 July 2023

Adnan Hrelja (born 10 October 1993) is a Bosnian-Herzegovinian footballer who currently plays for Čelik Zenica.
