= Marko Marović =

Serbian footballer

Personal information
- Full name: Marko Marović
- Date of birth: 30 January 1983 (age 43)
- Place of birth: Belgrade, SFR Yugoslavia
- Height: 1.83 m (6 ft 0 in)
- Position: Defender

Youth career
- Partizan

Senior career*
Years	Team	Apps	(Gls)
2001–2007	Partizan	0	(0)
2001–2004	→ Teleoptik (loan)	50	(0)
2004–2005	→ Rad (loan)	13	(0)
2005–2006	→ Obilić (loan)	25	(0)
2006–2007	→ Radnički Pirot (loan)	18	(0)
2008–2009	Čukarički	29	(0)
2009–2010	Gaz Metan Mediaș	12	(0)
2011	Dinamo Tbilisi	4	(0)
2011–2012	Pécsi MFC	18	(0)
2012–2014	Poli Timișoara	28	(0)
2015	Dinamo Pančevo		
2016–2020	Serbian White Eagles		

International career
1999	FR Yugoslavia U16	2	(0)
2001	FR Yugoslavia U19	5	(0)
- * Club domestic league appearances and goals as of 30 May 2017

Marko Marović (Serbian Cyrillic: Марко Маровић; born 30 January 1983) is a Serbian former professional footballer who played as a defender.

== Club career ==
=== Early career ===
Marović started his career at Partizan, signing his first professional contract with the club in June 2001.

He failed to make any competitive appearances for the first team, being loaned out to Teleoptik, Rad, Obilić, and Radnički Pirot. In early 2008, Marović moved to Serbian SuperLiga club Čukarički.

=== Romania ===
In 2009, Marović ventured abroad to play in the Romanian Liga I with Gaz Metan Mediaș.

=== Georgia ===
After the conclusion of the Romanian season, he became a free agent and was invited for a trial match in the Caucasus region with Dinamo Tbilisi. Following his trial, Dinamo Tbilisi signed him to a contract to compete in the Georgian Umaglesi Liga. His stint in the Georgian circuit was short-lived as he left the club after six months.

=== Central Europe ===
He returned to Europe to play in the Hungarian top-tier league with Pécsi. Once the season concluded, his contract with Pécsi was mutually terminated. In his single season in the Hungarian league, he appeared in 18 matches.

Following his departure from Hungary, Marović trained with Romanian side ACS Poli Timișoara. Ultimately, he secured a contract with Poli Timișoara in the Romanian Liga II. He helped the club secure a promotion to the country's top division. Timișoara re-signed Marović for the following season.

After a second run in the Romanian circuit, he played in the Serbian League Vojvodina with Dinamo Pančevo.

=== Canada ===
In 2016, he played abroad in the Canadian Soccer League with the Toronto-based Serbian White Eagles. Marović assisted the club in securing a playoff berth where the Serbs defeated Toronto Atomic in the opening round. The Serbs qualified for the championship final match by defeating FC Ukraine United in the semifinal. Marović appeared in the championship match where Toronto won the title by defeating Hamilton City.

He re-signed with Serbia the following season. Marović helped the Serbs secure a playoff berth by finishing second in the league's first division. In the preliminary round of the postseason, Toronto defeated SC Waterloo Region. Serbia's participation in the tournament concluded in the next round as the York Region Shooters would eliminate them. His final season in the Canadian circuit was in the 2020 season. He helped Serbia qualify for the postseason, where they were defeated in the first round by Vorkuta.

== International career ==
Marović represented FR Yugoslavia at under-16 and under-19 level in UEFA competitions.

== Honors ==
Serbian White Eagles

- CSL Championship: 2016
