= Vlado Marković =

Bosnian footballer (born 1985)

Personal information
- Date of birth: 26 August 1985 (age 41)
- Place of birth: Bijeljina, SFR Yugoslavia
- Height: 1.84 m (6 ft 0 in)
- Position: Defender

Senior career*
Years	Team	Apps	(Gls)
2006–2007	FK Pobeda	18	(1)
2007–2008	OFK Beograd	14	(0)
2008–2009	Borac Banja Luka	10	(0)
2008–2009	Slavija Sarajevo	6	(0)
2009	FK Pobeda	14	(1)
2010–2011	Skënderbeu	40	(2)
2011	Teuta	3	(1)
2012	Pécsi MFC	6	(0)
2012–2013	Čelik Zenica	8	(0)
2013	Mladost Velika Obarska	10	(1)
2014	Leotar	5	(0)
2015–?	Mladost Gacko	13	(0)
- * Club domestic league appearances and goals

Vladimir "Vlado" Marković (Serbian Cyrillic: Владимир Марковић, born 26 August 1985) is a Bosnian-Herzegovinian former professional footballer who played as a defender.

== Career ==
Born in Bijeljina (SR Bosnia and Herzegovina, SFR Yugoslavia), he played in Macedonian Prva Liga club FK Pobeda before moving, in 2007, to Serbian Superliga club OFK Beograd, where he stayed one season. In summer 2008, he was back to Bosnia to play in the Premier League of Bosnia and Herzegovina club Borac Banja Luka, but next winter, he moved to Slavija Sarajevo. In summer 2009, he moved back to FK Pobeda. During the 2009-10 winter break he signed for Skënderbeu in the Albanian Superliga where he played until summer 2011, when he moved to another Albanian top flight club, Teuta. In the winter break of the 2011–12 season he moved to Hungary and signed with Nemzeti Bajnokság I club Pécsi MFC. In summer 2012 he returned to Bosnia and signed with Premier League side Čelik Zenica. In the following summer he moved to newly promoted Mladost Velika Obarska.
